= Run (Dexter) =

- Dexter episode
- Episode no.: Season 7 Episode 4
- Directed by: John Dahl
- Written by: Wendy West
- Cinematography by: Jeffrey Jur
- Editing by: Louis Cioffi
- Original release date: October 21, 2012
- Running time: 54 minutes

Guest appearances
- Ray Stevenson as Isaak Sirko (special guest star); Yvonne Strahovski as Hannah McKay (special guest star); Aimee Garcia as Jamie Batista; Jason Gedrick as George Novikov; Katia Winter as Nadia; Matt Gerald as Ray Speltzer

Episode chronology
| ← Previous "Buck the System" | Next → "Swim Deep" |
- Dexter season 7

"Run" is the fourth episode of the seventh season of the American crime drama television series Dexter. It is the 76th overall episode of the series and was written by executive producer Wendy West, and directed by John Dahl. It originally aired on Showtime on October 21, 2012.

Set in Miami, the series centers on Dexter Morgan, a forensic technician specializing in bloodstain pattern analysis for the fictional Miami Metro Police Department, who leads a secret parallel life as a vigilante serial killer, hunting down murderers who have not been adequately punished by the justice system due to corruption or legal technicalities. In the episode, Dexter and Debra try to get Ray Speltzer brought in to pay for his crimes, but discover a roadblock. Meanwhile, Isaak tries to prevent Miami Metro from further investigating his club.

According to Nielsen Media Research, the episode was seen by an estimated 2.18 million household viewers and gained a 1.1 ratings share among adults aged 18–49. The episode received critical acclaim, who praised the scenes between Dexter and Debra, as well as the intensity of the labyrinth sequence.

== Plot ==
After another nightmare, Debra (Jennifer Carpenter) asks Dexter (Michael C. Hall) over his role in Arthur Mitchell's case and Rita's death. Dexter confirms he was chasing Arthur, but states he did not want Rita to get killed for it.

Speltzer (Matt Gerald) is arrested by four officers after a tense fight. Due to not enough evidence, the only way to prosecute him will be through a confession. Debra manages to obtain a confession after insinuating that he based his killings on his relationship with his mother. However, Speltzer and his lawyer successfully convince a judge that the officers used brutality during his arrest and that he could not consent to his Miranda rights, allowing Speltzer to walk freely. Dexter sneaks into Speltzer's RV to obtain evidence, only to get into a fight with Speltzer. Despite his determination, Dexter is knocked unconscious. He later wakes up trapped in Speltzer's labyrinth, but manages to escape.

After another police raid, Isaak (Ray Stevenson) concludes that they are not aware of Viktor's death, suggesting that either Dexter and/or Louis worked to kill him. To get the police out of the Koshka's back, Isaak and George (Jason Gedrick) convince a bartender to commit suicide with Mike Anderson's gun and take the blame for his murder, promising to secure the financial future of his family. Miami Metro is called to the crime scene, but Angel (David Zayas) is still not convinced that the bartender could kill Mike. He then shares his theory with Quinn (Desmond Harrington), and both conclude it might have been staged.

Debra has a fierce encounter with Speltzer at a funeral for his victim, and then talks with Dexter over how she does not want to end up like him. Dexter surprises Speltzer at the cemetery and knocks him unconscious with a shovel, taking him to his kill table at the crematorium. Dexter kills Speltzer by cremating his body along with his box of blood slides. He then meets with Debra, confirming that he killed Speltzer. When Debra asks if he did it for her, he says he did not. Debra is glad that Speltzer died, but questions her mentality.

== Production ==
=== Development ===
The episode was written by executive producer Wendy West, and directed by John Dahl. This was West's eighth writing credit, and Dahl's 13th directing credit.

== Reception ==
=== Viewers ===
In its original American broadcast, "Run" was seen by an estimated 2.18 million household viewers with a 1.1 in the 18–49 demographics. This means that 1.1 percent of all households with televisions watched the episode. This was a 10% increase in viewership from the previous episode, which was watched by an estimated 1.98 million household viewers with a 1.0 in the 18–49 demographics.

=== Critical reviews ===
"Run" received critical acclaim. Matt Fowler of IGN gave the episode an "amazing" 9.6 out of 10, and wrote, "I really enjoyed "Run." Like, really enjoyed it. Yeah, given the end of last week's episode and the guilt that Deb was feeling over arriving too late to save Speltzer's victim, the actual direction of this episode was predictable, but since it's a direction I was excited about heading, and a story that I'm anticipating getting into, I didn't mind at all. The angle here being, of course, Deb more or less accepting that Dexter's dark deeds fill a base societal need; perhaps even opening up the avenue of them working as a team in episodes ahead. And getting there, to the point at the end of the episode when Deb confesses to feeling good about Spelter's incineration, was thrilling."

Joshua Alston of The A.V. Club gave the episode a "B+" grade and wrote, "For the most part, I still think this season of Dexter is shaping up very strongly, but I'm maintaining a healthy skepticism about Hannah McKay until I can get an idea of what her character is meant to bring to the show. I've enjoyed Yvonne Strahovski's performance, even as I wait for a character to start forming around it." Kevin Fitzpatrick of ScreenCrush wrote, "Once again, Dexter very much continues its streak of goodwill with "Run," adding even more dimension to the developing relationship between Dexter and Deb. One has to wonder how many more turns the dynamic can take in future episodes, but for now the characters remain engaging as ever, while the Ukrainian gangster plot largely simmers in the background."

Richard Rys of Vulture wrote, "Based on her awakening this season so far, that might lead to some conflicted feelings next week, but it likely won't last. It seems she's starting to lose her mind a bit, but both Deb and the show are too smart this season to run down that path." Katy Waldman of Slate wrote, "I was surprised at the shift in their dynamic this episode. Usually we have Debra chasing Dexter, while he plays the secretive, brooding guy. But now that, to quote Dex, “everything’s changed,” he’s desperate to recapture Deb's love and acceptance, and she’s the one holding back. I think she really wounds him when she asks whether he is “capable of love.”"

Drusilla Moorhouse of Zap2it wrote, "Hannah and Dexter reconnect at the station, where she is helping with the Wayne Randall investigation. The two share some intriguing chemistry, although how their relationship will develop remains to be seen. Could she be his next damaged girlfriend à la Lumen?" Esther Gim of BuddyTV wrote, "They were going to kill him regardless; it was whether the man was going to do it himself or be killed. Not only that, but because they know everything about Dexter, they're watching him. Nothing good is going to come out of this, especially with Quinn being in the middle of everything with the stripper."

Nick Harley of Den of Geek wrote, "Dexter is having a massive resurgence in quality. Now a quarter way through its seventh season, the show feels completely reborn and refreshed after two stale and unsatisfying seasons." Matt Richenthal of TV Fanatic gave the episode a 4.4 star rating out of 5 and wrote, "I had a few nits to pick over the portrayal of Speltzer and how relatively easy it made for Deb to come around. But this was another terrific episode of Dexter. The series has successfully pushed Season 6 out of my mind and is fulfilling every expectation I had for what would happen once Deb learned of the Dark Passenger."

Alex Moaba of HuffPost wrote, "There are moments every now and then when watching Dexter that you are reminded that it feels a little weird to be rooting for a serial killer, even if he only kills other serial killers. I had this experience mid-way through "Run," when Dexter showed off some of his sociopathic hubris and maniacally yelled at Deb, "I control everything!" Of course, he doesn't, but by the end of the episode the show's writers made sure that events in the Ray Speltzer case made Dexter's vigilante argument to Deb better than he could himself." Television Without Pity gave the episode a "B+" grade.
