= Buck the System =

- Dexter episode
- Episode no.: Season 7 Episode 3
- Directed by: Stefan Schwartz
- Written by: Jace Richdale
- Cinematography by: Jeffrey Jur
- Editing by: Keith Henderson
- Original release date: October 14, 2012
- Running time: 56 minutes

Guest appearances
- Ray Stevenson as Isaak Sirko (special guest star); Yvonne Strahovski as Hannah McKay (special guest star); Aimee Garcia as Jamie Batista; Josh Cooke as Louis Greene; Jason Gedrick as George Novikov; Beth Grant as Donna Randall; Katia Winter as Nadia; Matt Gerald as Ray Speltzer

Episode chronology
| ← Previous "Sunshine and Frosty Swirl" | Next → "Run" |
- Dexter season 7

"Buck the System" is the third episode of the seventh season of the American crime drama television series Dexter. It is the 75th overall episode of the series and was written by co-executive producer Jace Richdale, and directed by Stefan Schwartz. It originally aired on Showtime on October 14, 2012.

Set in Miami, the series centers on Dexter Morgan, a forensic technician specializing in bloodstain pattern analysis for the fictional Miami Metro Police Department, who leads a secret parallel life as a vigilante serial killer, hunting down murderers who have not been adequately punished by the justice system due to corruption or legal technicalities. In the episode, Dexter tries to stalk a serial killer who may target a new victim, while Debra reconsiders her stance on her brother's activities.

According to Nielsen Media Research, the episode was seen by an estimated 1.98 million household viewers and gained a 1.0 ratings share among adults aged 18–49. The episode received critical acclaim, who praised the themes, writing and performances.

== Plot ==
As Debra (Jennifer Carpenter) does not let him leave the house at night, Dexter (Michael C. Hall) grows impatient for not being able to kill. After attacking an inmate who insulted him, Dexter finally tells Debra that he feels restricted with her presence, and she promises to give him some space. Dexter mails the prosthetic hand mailed back to Masuka (C. S. Lee), exposing Louis (Josh Cooke) as the owner, leading Masuka to fire Louis. Dexter also sends Jamie (Aimee Garcia) the video of Louis cheating on her, leading to their break-up. During this, Wayne Randall's mother, Donna (Beth Grant), arrives at Miami Metro to give her son's belongings for evidence. Dexter becomes interested in one of the victims, hoping he could track other victims. He also sets his sight on Ray Speltzer (Matt Gerald), a paroled killer who may be targeting his new victim. Dexter brings Debra to show that Speltzer will attack again, but Debra warns him to not get involved.

Nadia (Katia Winter) asks Quinn (Desmond Harrington) for a bracelet that belonged to Kaja, but Quinn states they never found a bracelet. Nadia returns to the Fox Hole, where George (Jason Gedrick) threatens her in finding it, as it contains a GPS that could lead them to Viktor's location, demanding that she gets close to Quinn. Nadia reveals this to Quinn, who agrees to help her. Isaak (Ray Stevenson) gets an IT technician to track the signal, discovering that Viktor was taken to a marina before losing signal in the ocean. George and Isaak visit the marina, finding Louis sabotaging Dexter's boat. He is then threatened into revealing it belongs to Dexter before being murdered.

To prevent Dexter from killing Speltzer, Debra has him accompany Angel (David Zayas) and question Randall's ex-girlfriend and partner-in-crime, Hannah McKay (Yvonne Strahovski). Hannah is uncooperative, but eventually relents by allowing Dexter to get a DNA sample of her. Subsequently, Dexter checks a mausoleum that Speltzer frequents, discovering that he keeps belongings from his victims. Speltzer brings a woman to his house, forcing her to participate in a Minotauran labyrinth he constructed inside, where he kills her. Debra stakes his house, but calls Dexter when she hears screams. Debra enters his house, but is knocked unconscious by Speltzer. Before he can kill her, Dexter attacks him, but Speltzer flees the scene. Upon discovering the woman's corpse, Debra laments that stopping Dexter from killing him led to her death. While she cannot accept his actions, she finally understands the purpose of Dexter's Code.

== Production ==
=== Development ===
The episode was written by co-executive producer Jace Richdale, and directed by Stefan Schwartz. This was Richdale's third writing credit, and Schwartz's second directing credit.

== Reception ==
=== Viewers ===
In its original American broadcast, "Buck the System" was seen by an estimated 1.98 million household viewers with a 1.0 in the 18–49 demographics. This means that 1 percent of all households with televisions watched the episode. This was a 6% decrease in viewership from the previous episode, which was watched by an estimated 2.10 million household viewers with a 1.1 in the 18–49 demographics.

=== Critical reviews ===
"Buck the System" received critical acclaim. Matt Fowler of IGN gave the episode a "great" 8.8 out of 10, and wrote, ""Buck the System" was a nice treat. It ended Dexter and Deb's co-habitation before it got too strange, it gave us some decent scares with regards to Speltzer's sicko SAW version of Murderworld, and it worked hard and efficiently to move Dexter and Deb closer to possibly having something that mirrors the working relationship they had in the book series."

Joshua Alston of The A.V. Club gave the episode an "A–" grade and wrote, "I'm also a huge fan of Isaac because he killed Louis, thereby eliminating the show's most problematic element. I'm also interested to see where things lead with Hannah, who appears to be the latest love interest for Dexter, but one that would never be able to abide by his addiction the way Lila or Lumen did. There's certainly enough juice here to power the remainder of the season, but I hope the writers are able to keep things as thematically strong as they have been in these first three episodes."

Richard Rys of Vulture wrote, "Deb still has many questions to ask, but getting too caught up in reality checks on a show about a serial killer forensics analyst is a trap that will only lead to misery and letdown. Though Dexter feels free at last, when Deb says “Everything's changed,” it's crushing for him — and hopefully a sign of more surprises in store for us." Katy Waldman of Slate wrote, "the sequence of bloody daydreams he had in the beginning was great. For me the transition between fantasy and reality felt creepily seamless: I was convinced Dex was only "thinking" about attacking the suspect who wouldn't open his mouth for the DNA swab. Alas, not the case."

Drusilla Moorhouse of Zap2it wrote, "Just three episodes into Dexter's seventh season, things are moving along at lightning speed between Dexter and Deb. Just days after discovering he is a serial killer, his sister might have come to appreciate what a valuable service he provides - to public safety, if not Miami Metro Homicide's case-closure statistics." Esther Gim of BuddyTV wrote, "Now we'll never know what Louis' grand scheme was for Dexter, if he even had one. I feel a little cheated that Dexter wasn't the one who took care of Louis, since now the bad guys know who killed Viktor. I just can't settle for Louis just being a creepy stalker with an obsession for Dex. But now I have to."

Billy Grifter of Den of Geek wrote, "After two intense episodes, it would be normal for the brakes to be applied somewhat in Buck the System, and they are in the early part of the story. The thrust of what happens, without microscopic analysis, is a continuation of the Dexter selling the idea to Debra that what he does has a place in the world. It's a tough sell, but with unexpected help from serial killer Ray Speltzer, played by seasoned hard man actor Matt Gerald, it might be achievable." Matt Richenthal of TV Fanatic gave the episode a 4.7 star rating out of 5 and wrote, "Dexter has never really tackled them before. Viewers were introduced to the character as a killer and to the show as a very dark comedy. We were just meant to accept his urges and go along for the ride. However, to borrow the most overly-used phrase in the television reviewing business, the game has now changed and the fascination with Season 7 so far hasn't been any kind of action or suspense."

Alex Moaba of HuffPost wrote, "After Deb spent most of last episode trying to convince herself she could rehabilitate the serial killer out of Dexter, she came close to seeing his side of things in "Buck The System."" Television Without Pity gave the episode a "B" grade.
