= Sunshine and Frosty Swirl =

- Dexter episode
- Episode no.: Season 7 Episode 2
- Directed by: Steve Shill
- Written by: Manny Coto
- Cinematography by: Jeffrey Jur
- Editing by: Amy E. Duddleston
- Original release date: October 7, 2012
- Running time: 59 minutes

Guest appearances
- Ray Stevenson as Isaak Sirko (special guest star); Aimee Garcia as Jamie Batista; Josh Cooke as Louis Greene; Jason Gedrick as George Novikov; Katia Winter as Nadia; Daniel Buran as Wayne Randall; Wil Traval as Tony Rush

Episode chronology
← Previous "Are You...?"	Next → "Buck the System"
- Dexter season 7

"Sunshine and Frosty Swirl" is the second episode of the seventh season of the American crime drama television series Dexter. It is the 74th overall episode of the series and was written by executive producer Manny Coto, and directed by Steve Shill. It originally aired on Showtime on October 7, 2012.

Set in Miami, the series centers on Dexter Morgan, a forensic technician specializing in bloodstain pattern analysis for the fictional Miami Metro Police Department, who leads a secret parallel life as a vigilante serial killer, hunting down murderers who have not been adequately punished by the justice system due to corruption or legal technicalities. In the episode, Dexter and Debra consider rehab to help Dexter deal with his addiction, while Dexter discovers who cancelled his credit cards. Meanwhile, a serial killer is prepared to reveal the location of unfound bodies, while Miami Metro continues pressuring the Fox Hole strip club in cooperating.

According to Nielsen Media Research, the episode was seen by an estimated 2.10 million household viewers and gained a 1.1 ratings share among adults aged 18–49. The episode received mostly positive reviews from critics, who praised the performances, writing and character development.

== Plot ==
After Dexter (Michael C. Hall) confirms he is a serial killer, Debra (Jennifer Carpenter) tries to leave, until Dexter chases her and gets her back to his apartment. Dexter explains his Dark Passenger and the Code of Harry, and Debra is upset to learn that Harry (James Remar) helped him. She is unable to process it, and leaves the apartment after punching Dexter.

Dexter also discovers that the Ice Truck Killer's prosthetic hand was stolen from the evidence locker, and Masuka (C. S. Lee) tells him Louis (Josh Cooke) was trying to track it. Deducing Louis sent it to him, Miami Metro continues investigating the Fox Hole strip club, but George Novikov (Jason Gedrick) claims no one knows anything about Kaja's murder. During this, Quinn (Desmond Harrington) becomes smitten with a stripper, Nadia (Katia Winter), and she provides him in contact with Tony Rush (Wil Traval), the club's bouncer who was Kaja's boyfriend. Security footage corroborates Tony's innocence, but he tells them that Kaja left the club with Viktor Baskov. Novikov is later visited by Isaak Sirko (Ray Stevenson), who wants to investigate Viktor's whereabouts. Later, Isaak kills Tony for speaking with the police.

Instead of arresting him, Debra decides that Dexter needs "rehab", for which he will move in with Debra so she can watch over him. Dexter agrees to her terms, which will also require him to stop lying. Wayne Randall (Daniel Buran), a convicted serial killer responsible for a string of murders committed 15 years prior with his girlfriend, tells Miami Metro that he is willing to reveal the location of unfound bodies, claiming he regrets his past and wants to clear his conscience. Debra does not want Dexter involved in the case, but allows him to replace Masuka in the case. Dexter talks with Randall, and he questions if he can truly feel regret for his actions. After discovering that the blood slide at the church belongs to Travis Marshall, LaGuerta (Lauren Vélez) asks the FBI for the blood slides in the Bay Harbor Butcher's case.

Dexter sneaks into Louis' penthouse, finding the evidence that he cancelled his credit cards. He also finds a video of Louis getting oral sex from a woman, along with a video stating he wants to destroy Dexter's life and also suggesting he framed someone with the police. When Louis shows, Dexter attacks him and warns him to stay away from him and Jamie (Aimee Garcia). When it is clear Louis will not back down, Dexter sedates Debra to escape the house and stalk Louis to kill him. He sedates him, but cannot bring himself to kill him. He instead calls Debra to explain what he was going to do, and Debra is relieved that he did not go forward. The following day, while the police digs at the site, Dexter has another conversation with Randall. Randall laments that his girlfriend, Hannah McKay, stopped caring for him and claims he has another person to kill. Suddenly, he jumps in front of a passing truck, committing suicide. Dexter realizes that Randall did not care if the bodies were found, he only wanted a few days outside prison. Dexter then wonders, "he couldn't take life in prison. Can I?"

== Production ==
=== Development ===
The episode was written by executive producer Manny Coto, and directed by Steve Shill. This was Coto's sixth writing credit, and Shill's ninth directing credit.

== Reception ==
=== Viewers ===
In its original American broadcast, "Sunshine and Frosty Swirl" was seen by an estimated 2.10 million household viewers with a 1.1 in the 18–49 demographics. This means that 1.1 percent of all households with televisions watched the episode. This was a 13% decrease in viewership from the previous episode, which was watched by an estimated 2.40 million household viewers with a 1.3 in the 18–49 demographics.

=== Critical reviews ===
"Sunshine and Frosty Swirl" received mostly positive reviews. Matt Fowler of IGN gave the episode a "great" 8.1 out of 10, and wrote, "Was everything about this week's Dexter episode, "Sunshine and Frosty Swirl," great? No. But the immediate fallout from last week's amazing cliffhanger, along with all the Dex and Deb stuff, was top of the line. Just really well-thought out and well-executed. And I certainly hope that Jennifer Carpenter, who we all know is fantastic even when her storylines are ridiculous, gets some sort of recognition for her performance this season."

Joshua Alston of The A.V. Club gave the episode a "B+" grade and wrote, "“Sunshine and Frosty Swirl” wasn't quite as strong as the season première, but it was strong enough that it may soon be time to stop waiting for the other shoe to drop. Everything is clicking into place here. The sense of urgency is back, and it feels like there's a much better handle on the mythology that had gotten so muddled in seasons prior. It's almost as though, having milked cash out of the show for four years, the Showtime brass is now comfortable letting Dexter be the show it seemed like it would be when it first started out. If Scott Buck and his team can keep this momentum up, the final two seasons of this show could be redemptive."

Richard Rys of Vulture wrote, "In the closing moments, when all that's left of Randall is a blood stain on the blacktop and his white canvas shoe, Dexter contemplates his possible life in prison (or in his case, what would certainly be Death Row). Worse yet, he knows that Deb will forever see him as a killer. Like us, Dexter senses that his story won't end with rays of sunshine and ice-cream cones." Katy Waldman of Slate wrote, "Definitely not the most functional family meal. At the same time, though, I thought it showed the writers’ sense of humor. They're playing around and having fun, which I think makes the show better. In the past it's felt a little leaden or self-serious."

Drusilla Moorhouse of Zap2it wrote, "Instead, he really concocted the story so he could enjoy the sunshine and a Frosty Swirl before committing suicide. Although he had Dexter convinced for a while that prison wasn't so bad, he jumped in front of a truck." Esther Gim of BuddyTV wrote, "Dexter eats it all up, but in the end, it's pointless because Wayne kills himself. He just wanted to be released from prison so he could enjoy the sun and a frosty swirl before jumping out into traffic. It's darkly humorous, especially since the blood lands all over Dexter's face."

Billy Grifter of Den of Geek wrote, "With only two episodes on the slab so far, Dexter season 7 is setting a pace that could be difficult to maintain, and a disturbing direction that's far from predictable so far." Matt Richenthal of TV Fanatic gave the episode a 3.9 star rating out of 5 and wrote, "So a few complaints overall and a bit of a letdown from the stellar opener. But I'm still anxious for what comes next and, let's face it: there were no imaginary history professors, so Season 7 remains eons above Season 6."

Alex Moaba of HuffPost wrote, "Dexter was having a deep conversation with an incarcerated serial killer who claimed he'd grown a conscience before the guy threw himself in front of a truck in the episode's disturbing final scene. This should open the door for his murder-spree partner in crime, who was a minor at the time, to enter the story in the form of Yvonne Strahovski's character Hannah McKay." Television Without Pity gave the episode a "B" grade.
