= Swim Deep (Dexter) =

- Dexter episode
- Episode no.: Season 7 Episode 5
- Directed by: Ernest Dickerson
- Written by: Scott Reynolds
- Cinematography by: Jeffrey Jur
- Editing by: Amy E. Duddleston
- Original release date: October 28, 2012
- Running time: 57 minutes

Guest appearances
- Ray Stevenson as Isaak Sirko (special guest star); Yvonne Strahovski as Hannah McKay (special guest star); Jason Gedrick as George Novikov; Katia Winter as Nadia; Bubba Lewis as Tyler Barnes

Episode chronology
| ← Previous "Run" | Next → "Do the Wrong Thing" |
- Dexter season 7

"Swim Deep" is the fifth episode of the seventh season of the American crime drama television series Dexter. It is the 77th overall episode of the series and was written by producer Scott Reynolds, and directed by Ernest Dickerson. It originally aired on Showtime on October 28, 2012.

Set in Miami, the series centers on Dexter Morgan, a forensic technician specializing in bloodstain pattern analysis for the fictional Miami Metro Police Department, who leads a secret parallel life as a vigilante serial killer, hunting down murderers who have not been adequately punished by the justice system due to corruption or legal technicalities. In the episode, Dexter and Debra discover that LaGuerta is re-opening the Bay Harbor Butcher's case, while Isaak finally gets a chance to meet Dexter.

According to Nielsen Media Research, the episode was seen by an estimated 2.28 million household viewers and gained a 1.2 ratings share among adults aged 18–49. The episode received critical acclaim, with critics praising the scenes between Dexter and Isaak, as well as Jennifer Carpenter's performance.

== Plot ==
Dexter (Michael C. Hall) discovers blood in his boat, realizing someone murdered another person in his boat. After analyzing the blood, he discovers it belongs to Louis. When he returns to his apartment, he finds that someone broke in, and leaves by setting up a false meeting at a restaurant. He then sees Isaak (Ray Stevenson) leaving, recognizing him as the man in the Fox Hole.

At the station, Debra (Jennifer Carpenter) worries when Masuka (C. S. Lee) reveals that LaGuerta (Lauren Vélez) is running a blood test on Travis Marshall's slide. When she asks LaGuerta, she confirms she is re-opening the Bay Harbor Butcher's case, as she believes the killer is actually active. While Debra tries to downplay her suspicions, she decides to get involved in her case to see what she has on Dexter. Debra informs Dexter about the investigation, and admonishes him for his careless behavior. She visits a family, whose patriarch was killed by Dexter after he was seen at a wedding. Noticing Dexter in a photograph, Debra hides it from LaGuerta.

When Isaak arrives at the restaurant, Dexter contacts him by phone to know why he is following him. Isaak confirms killing Louis, and threatens to kill Dexter and anyone involved in Viktor's death. This prompts Dexter to reveal that he is Viktor's killer, and leaves, getting Debra to go into hiding with him at a motel. During this, Dexter once again meets Hannah (Yvonne Strahovski), who has decided to cooperate with the police in identifying Wayne Randall's remaining victims, claiming Randall acted alone. Dexter and Hannah exchange a conversation as the police digs the bodies, which is a couple. Dexter concludes Randall killed the man, but believes Hannah was involved in killing the woman, given the height needed. Hannah denies her involvement, and she will not be prosecuted as she received an immunity deal for cooperating.

To get rid of Isaak, Dexter tricks him into entering a Colombian bar, which is filled by a rival gang of the Koshka. However, Isaak effortlessly kills everyone inside and leaves. When Miami Metro is called to the scene, Dexter discovers Isaak's blood, which gets him arrested. Dexter pays him a visit, and Isaak reiterates their problem is not finished. Debra is visited by Angel (David Zayas), who is still unsure if the bartender was responsible for Mike's death. Debra bluntly tells him to stop investigating him, disappointing Angel. Upset that she is now lying to cover for Dexter, Debra gives him the wedding photograph depicting Dexter, telling him she does not want to get involved in any future killing. Subsequently, Dexter burns the photo.

== Production ==
=== Development ===
The episode was written by producer Scott Reynolds, and directed by Ernest Dickerson. This was Reynolds' eighth writing credit, and Dickerson's seventh directing credit.

== Reception ==
=== Viewers ===
In its original American broadcast, "Swim Deep" was seen by an estimated 2.28 million household viewers with a 1.2 in the 18–49 demographics. This means that 1.2 percent of all households with televisions watched the episode. This was a 4% increase in viewership from the previous episode, which was watched by an estimated 2.18 million household viewers with a 1.1 in the 18–49 demographics.

=== Critical reviews ===
"Swim Deep" received critical acclaim. Matt Fowler of IGN gave the episode an "amazing" 9 out of 10, and wrote, ""Swim Deep" went off in many different directions at times, but they were always excellent. Dexter and Deb were able to get a little more intimate, which is okay considering their new bond, while still remaining in separate hotel beds. One thing we know now is that when Dexter says "I can handle it," chances are he can't."

Joshua Alston of The A.V. Club gave the episode an "A–" grade and wrote, ""Swim Deep" is a dense, taut episode that manages to avoid many of the show's stumbling blocks. There is no kill of the week. The supporting characters all feel part of the story in an organic way, and are used when there's a valid reason for them to be there. Even the deployment of Ghost Harry is merciful in its brevity, and he engaged Dexter in an illuminating conversation about the evolution of his relationship with Deb." Kevin Fitzpatrick of ScreenCrush wrote, "While "Swim Deep" certainly takes things in an intriguing direction with both Hannah McKay's story and Isaak's incarceration, we're hoping that the final scene isn't a way of shaking off the big reveal between Dexter and Debra. We're also not terribly thrilled to see Quinn falling in with yet another bad element, but for now the episode certainly keeps things moving."

Richard Rys of Vulture wrote, "Forgive me for sounding like a broken record, but how good is this season so far? All the tension between Dexter and Debra, along with his slow, inevitable march toward finally being exposed as a serial killer, is really paying off." Katy Waldman of Slate wrote, "He's just, as Deb says, the Terminator. Although maybe he represents the dangers of surrendering to all sorts of passions, romantic and vengeful? “This is personal,” he tells Dexter, even though he should be a bureaucratic figure: the head of a large crime organization."

Drusilla Moorhouse of Zap2it wrote, "With Isaak, Dex metes out justice that doesn't involve shrink wrap and duct tape. Instead, he lures the Koshka Brotherhood boss to a Colombian cartel bar, expecting the drug warlords to kill him. Instead, Isaak slays them all like a cyborg assassin -- but not without spilling some of his own blood, leading to his arrest. Is it truly "over," as Dexter swears to the imprisoned but patiently vengeful mob boss? Considering Miami Homicide's murder closure rate, we suspect not - especially since Quinn's hands are so dirty." Esther Gim of BuddyTV wrote, "Though not the most action-packed episode we've seen so far, it's nice to get a bit of a break to set up other storylines."

Billy Grifter of Den of Geek wrote, "It's times like that where Dexter can fall into a habit of messing with the audience because it can, which is a lazy alternative to building a narrative where a surprise is genuine rather than tactically constructed. It's time for real revelations and development, and less smoke and mirrors." Matt Richenthal of TV Fanatic gave the episode a 4.4 star rating out of 5 and wrote, "So another impressive episode overall. The show is managing to juggle a trio of storylines – Deb vs. Dexter, the presence of Hannah, the threat of Isaak – very well, keeping its foot on the suspenseful pedal without even including any major bloodshed."

Alex Moaba of HuffPost wrote, "So they've reached an uneasy understanding now, and with this relationship seeming more settled - at least for the time being - it will be interesting to see how the show pivots towards its eventual end-game, and if the main conflict will now become Dexter vs. the Ukrainian mob? After Dexter's showdown with mob boss Isaak Sirko, that looks like a distinct possibility." Television Without Pity gave the episode a "B+" grade.
