= Helter Skelter (Dexter) =

- Dexter episode
- Episode no.: Season 7 Episode 9
- Directed by: Steve Shill
- Written by: Tim Schlattmann
- Cinematography by: Jeffrey Jur
- Editing by: Keith Henderson
- Original release date: November 25, 2012
- Running time: 57 minutes

Guest appearances
- Ray Stevenson as Isaak Sirko (special guest star); Yvonne Strahovski as Hannah McKay (special guest star); Geoff Pierson as Thomas Matthews; Jason Gedrick as George Novikov; Katia Winter as Nadia

Episode chronology
← Previous "Argentina"	Next → "The Dark… Whatever"
- Dexter season 7

"Helter Skelter" is the ninth episode of the seventh season of the American crime drama television series Dexter. It is the 81st overall episode of the series and was written by executive producer Tim Schlattmann, and directed by Steve Shill. It originally aired on Showtime on November 25, 2012.

Set in Miami, the series centers on Dexter Morgan, a forensic technician specializing in bloodstain pattern analysis for the fictional Miami Metro Police Department, who leads a secret parallel life as a vigilante serial killer, hunting down murderers who have not been adequately punished by the justice system due to corruption or legal technicalities. In the episode, Dexter is forced to cooperate with Isaak when he kidnaps Hannah, while LaGuerta asks Matthews to help her investigation.

According to Nielsen Media Research, the episode was seen by an estimated 2.12 million household viewers and gained a 1.0 ratings share among adults aged 18–49. The episode received highly positive reviews from critics, who praised the closure to Isaak's story arc.

== Plot ==
Isaak (Ray Stevenson) is informed by Jurg (Andrew Kirsanov) that the Koshka Brotherhood has sent two more hitmen after Isaak. As their options run out, Isaak pays a visit to Dexter (Michael C. Hall), asking for help, and stating he will be willing to put their conflict aside. Despite the offer, Dexter refuses.

Dexter assists Miami Metro in a new case, where a man was found burned in his car. While the police believes it might be a suicide, Dexter concludes an arsonist is responsible. When another victim is found, they realize they are after a serial killer, nicknamed the Phantom Arsonist. He takes the opportunity to talk with Debra (Jennifer Carpenter) over her confession, but she refuses to delve further. When Hannah (Yvonne Strahovski) asks to meet him at his apartment, Dexter finds Isaak instead. Isaak reveals he kidnapped Hannah and forces Dexter to help him fight the hitman, promising to leave their conflict afterwards. To help their mission, Dexter gets Debra to call off the security detail following Isaak.

LaGuerta (Lauren Vélez) visits Matthews (Geoff Pierson), offering her new theory that the Bay Harbor Butcher is still active. Matthews is not convinced of her claims, reiterating that James Doakes was the killer, even if she states he never owned a boat. However, he later returns to help her investigation, if she can get him reinstated as police chief to get his proper retirement plan. Quinn (Desmond Harrington) visits the Fox Hole, where Nadia (Katia Winter) reveals that George (Jason Gedrick) forced her to have sex with him. Angered, Quinn brutally attacks George and takes Nadia out.

Dexter tracks one of the hitmen to a shooting range, and successfully kills him. As he talks with Hannah, Dexter uses a picture to find her location. Hannah poisons Jurg and manages to kill him, but loses consciousness after she is stabbed. Debra finds her location, and calls an ambulance. With the other hitman following Dexter, Isaak gets him to go to a cargo ship to confront him. Dexter and Isaak overpower and kill the hitman, throwing his body in the ocean. Suddenly, George arrives and shoots Isaak, fleeing before Dexter can catch him. In his dying moment, Isaak asks to be buried in the same place where Dexter dumped Viktor's body. Before dying, Isaak exchanges a conversation with Dexter over his nature, expressing that he never felt alive until he met Viktor. This prompts Dexter to visit Hannah at the hospital, saying that he felt scared that he would lose her, proclaiming that he feels safe with her.

== Production ==
=== Development ===
The episode was written by executive producer Tim Schlattmann, and directed by Steve Shill. This was Schlattmann's 13th writing credit, and Shill's tenth directing credit.

== Reception ==
=== Viewers ===
In its original American broadcast, "Helter Skelter" was seen by an estimated 2.12 million household viewers with a 1.0 in the 18–49 demographics. This means that 1 percent of all households with televisions watched the episode. This was a 6% decrease in viewership from the previous episode, which was watched by an estimated 2.25 million household viewers with a 1.1 in the 18–49 demographics.

=== Critical reviews ===
"Helter Skelter" received positive reviews from critics. Matt Fowler of IGN gave the episode a "great" 8.5 out of 10, and wrote, "Even though it wasn't said outright, Hannah now knows that Deb knows. There's also a slight chance that Hannah picked up on Deb's underlying feelings for Dex. "Helter Skelter" was a pretty fine episode that took me in a direction I didn't expect, but it also planted a few seeds that I'm not entirely crazy about."

Joshua Alston of The A.V. Club gave the episode a "B–" grade and wrote, "Obviously, there will be more complications for Dexter now that LaGuerta is getting closer to cracking the mystery of the Bay Harbor Butcher, and now that Matthews has agreed to give her damaging information about the Morgan clan. But a tightening noose around Dexter can only be mildly potent as a plot element because we know he won't be caught. It's more of a question of what happens to LaGuerta, whom I only now care about in so much as she's closing in on Dexter. It's quite the paradox."

Richard Rys of Vulture gave the episode a 2 star rating out of 5 and wrote, "By the time the credits rolled, I wondered what Dex would have to say about my disappointment. Granted, following the sublime "Argentina" was a tough task. But in a season that's reminded us how good this series can still be, last night was a letdown." Kevin Fitzpatrick of ScreenCrush wrote, "We admitted last week to our uncertainty that the Hannah and Isaak threads could successfully dovetail, but now that Isaak himself is out of the picture, what are we left with? Will the "Phantom Arsonist" turn out to be an imposing villain? Will Dexter next take on George, or even LaGuerta? Don't get us wrong, Dexter has definitely earned back some credit over the season, but the episodes after "Helter Skelter" will have us very nervous."

Katy Waldman of Slate wrote, "While the episode provided a bit of wish fulfillment — I really wanted to see Dexter and Isaak team up in a murderer-buddy comedy, and they actually started to do it a little — I was mostly disappointed, especially by sappy and unconvincing dialogue in the second half." Drusilla Moorhouse of Zap2it wrote, "two Miami Metro men are gunning for Georgie-boy. Quinn is livid that Isaak's heir apparent slept with Nadia, and fought back with his fists. Will Dexter kill George in time to save Quinn's career and Nadia's life?"

Billy Grifter of Den of Geek wrote, "It's difficult to see it any other way, but the creative people behind Dexter dropped the ball right at the point that season seven was about to score, big time! And, as odd as this might seem, I find it difficult to pin it on the writing team as specifically their fault." Matt Richenthal of TV Fanatic gave the episode a 4.6 star rating out of 5 and wrote, "For a show previously best known for its action and plot turns, this season has been all about heartfelt conversations. Between Deb and Dexter. Dexter and Hannah. Dexter and Isaak. Guts continue to be spilled each week, but this time in the figurative sense."

Alex Moaba of HuffPost wrote, "now seems like a good time to say that I thought Ray Stevenson did a great job acting the Isaak character. He brought an unusual amount of depth and soul to a Dexter villain." Television Without Pity gave the episode an "A–" grade.
