= Argentina (Dexter) =

- Dexter episode
- Episode no.: Season 7 Episode 8
- Directed by: Romeo Tirone
- Written by: Arika Lisanne Mittman
- Cinematography by: Jeffrey Jur
- Editing by: Amy E. Duddleston
- Original release date: November 18, 2012
- Running time: 58 minutes

Guest appearances
- Ray Stevenson as Isaak Sirko (special guest star); Yvonne Strahovski as Hannah McKay (special guest star); Aimee Garcia as Jamie Batista; Jason Gedrick as George Novikov; Katia Winter as Nadia; Christina Robinson as Astor Bennett; Preston Bailey as Cody Bennett

Episode chronology
← Previous "Chemistry"	Next → "Helter Skelter"
- Dexter season 7

"Argentina" is the eighth episode of the seventh season of the American crime drama television series Dexter. It is the 80th overall episode of the series and was written by co-producer Arika Lisanne Mittman, and directed by Romeo Tirone. It originally aired on Showtime on November 18, 2012.

Set in Miami, the series centers on Dexter Morgan, a forensic technician specializing in bloodstain pattern analysis for the fictional Miami Metro Police Department, who leads a secret parallel life as a vigilante serial killer, hunting down murderers who have not been adequately punished by the justice system due to corruption or legal technicalities. In the episode, Dexter is conflicted over Debra's request to kill Hannah, while Isaak puts his revenge plan into motion.

According to Nielsen Media Research, the episode was seen by an estimated 2.25 million household viewers and gained a 1.1 ratings share among adults aged 18–49. The episode received highly positive reviews from critics, who praised the dialogue and performances.

== Plot ==
Dexter (Michael C. Hall) visits Debra (Jennifer Carpenter), telling her he cannot kill Hannah (Yvonne Strahovski) as she asked him. Debra reiterates that she is responsible for many murders, including Sal Price, even playing his recorded interview with her, where she confessed to killing a woman with Wayne Randall. Dexter turns her down, saying the decision will follow her for the rest of her life if he kills her.

Isaak (Ray Stevenson) evades the police following him, allowing himself the chance to try to kill Dexter near a donut shop, but misses the shots. Debra hopes she can use this to charge Isaak, but Dexter does not think anything will come out of it. The Koshka Brotherhood grows frustrated with Isaak's actions, as he is deviating from their business ventures. They contact George (Jason Gedrick), who offers to solve their situation. George wants Quinn (Desmond Harrington) to continue working for him, but Quinn refuses and threatens to open an investigation on the Fox Hole's illegal immigrants. George later visits him, showing that he has an audio exposing Quinn destroying the blood evidence against Isaak. He forces Quinn to cooperate in supervising drug circulation at the strip club.

Astor (Christina Robinson) and Cody (Preston Bailey) arrive in Miami to stay with Dexter while their grandfather undergoes surgery. As Isaak might target Dexter, Debra agrees to let them stay with her. They go dining at the new restaurant owned by Angel (David Zayas), where Cody reveals that Astor has been smoking marijuana. Dexter offers advice to Astor, and promises not to tell her grandparents. Deducing that Isaak might be staying at Viktor's apartment, Dexter pays him a visit, only to discover a hitman sent to kill Isaak. Dexter overpowers the hitman and kills him. Isaak and his bodyguard Jurg Yeliashkevych find the body, realizing that the Koshka ordered a hit on Isaak. With very limited resources, Isaak is forced to call Miami Metro on the scene.

LaGuerta (Lauren Vélez) continues her investigation, reducing the list of police workers who own a boat. She takes an interest in Dexter's boat, especially as he suddenly moved out of his usual marina around the time of the Bay Harbor Butcher's discovery. Debra discovers that Dexter is in a relationship with Hannah, which is why he refused her request to kill her. As they argue, Debra finally confesses she went to the church where he killed Travis Marshall to tell him she loved him.

Dumbfounded by the revelation, Dexter leaves Debra's house. He follows Isaak to what turns out to be a gay bar. They agree to pause their attempts to ambush one another, opting instead for a civil conversation in which they establish their mutual respect. Isaak reveals that Viktor was his lover, which explains why his quest for revenge is personal. Despite his unwavering intent to kill Dexter, he acknowledges his shared nature as an outsider in society, albeit for different reasons, and declares that they could have been friends "under different circumstances."

The episode ends with Debra sharing a joint with Astor, Isaak listening repeatedly to Viktor's last voice message in his secret hideout, and Dexter returning to Hannah and reflecting on the meaning of "home".

== Production ==
=== Development ===
The episode was written by co-producer Arika Lisanne Mittman, and directed by Romeo Tirone. This was Mittman's second writing credit, and Tirone's fifth directing credit.

== Reception ==
=== Viewers ===
In its original American broadcast, "Argentina" was seen by an estimated 2.25 million household viewers with a 1.1 in the 18–49 demographics. This means that 1.1 percent of all households with televisions watched the episode. This was a 11% increase in viewership from the previous episode, which was watched by an estimated 2.01 million household viewers with a 1.1 in the 18–49 demographics.

=== Critical reviews ===
"Argentina" received highly positive reviews from critics. Matt Fowler of IGN gave the episode a "great" 8.9 out of 10, and wrote, ""Argentina" was a big Dexter episode, and not just because it ran about seven minutes longer than the usual chapters. It wasn't exactly action-packed, but it contained a handful of truly excellent one-on-one scenes; something that I don't often get the chance to praise this series for. The scenes Dexter had with Deb, Hannah and Isaak were remarkable, and I find myself wanting to laud this episode in the same way I'd compliment, say, an episode of Game of Thrones for just really great dialogue and scene work."

Joshua Alston of The A.V. Club gave the episode a "B+" grade and wrote, "It's a sign of a television show's strong footing when it can sell you on choices you initially balked at. And when that show is Dexter, which at its nadir served up about a dozen dubious choices per episode, it's pretty exhilarating to feel that sense of confidence again. “Argentina” had that swagger about it. It wasn't the best episode of the season, but it's one that made a stronger case for elements of prior episodes than those episodes made themselves." Kevin Fitzpatrick of ScreenCrush wrote, "It's hard to view episodes like "Argentina" and not call Dexter season 7 the renaissance of a stagnant series, but darn it all if the episode didn't find a way to neatly dovetail some wayward threads. The series has managed to imbue characters like Isaak and Hannah with real depth and relevance to the series, while simultaneously redeeming more troublesome aspects like Dexter's step-children or even Deb's incestuous love."

Richard Rys of Vulture gave the episode a perfect 5 star rating out of 5 and wrote, "Let's take a moment to give the writer some props. In terms of plotting and dialogue, this was the best episode of the season. The theme of outsiders looking for a safe place and somewhere to belong resurfaces in smart ways." Katy Waldman of Slate wrote, "It's back! This episode surprised me in a lot of ways, but maybe the most shocking part was the resurrection of the Deb-loves-Dex storyline."

Drusilla Moorhouse of Zap2it wrote, "why bring Rita's kids back to Dexter? Seeing his family on the beach, Hannah is reminded again of the normal life - including children - she also wanted. Also, Astor gives Dex an opportunity to obliquely wonder how he would've grown up without Harry's tutelage. And for us to wonder, does James Remar contribute anything to this show anymore?" Esther Gim of BuddyTV wrote, "This week's episode, titled "Argentina," brings out all of Dexter's relationships and turns them upside down. He escapes relatively unscathed - for now - but it's yet to be seen what kind of impact these truths will have for the future."

Billy Grifter of Den of Geek wrote, "Overall, this was one of the strongest Dexter stories for some time, though the somewhat manic mood changes did make it play like an odd combination of noir and farce. The notion of Argentina isn't that somewhere distant is so much better than where you currently are, but that it offers the possibility of not having the problems you're currently saddled with. Ultimately ‘home’ is being who you really are, and not a geographic location." Matt Richenthal of TV Fanatic gave the episode a 3.6 star rating out of 5 and wrote, "For the most part, "Argentina" was a relatively slow episode. Astor, Cody and Harrison stopped by; Jamie once again proved she's the greatest nanny of all-time; Batista bought his restaurant. There wasn't a lot of movement on the Hannah McKay front and Deb opened up about her feelings for her brother, easily the most ridiculous and misguided storyline in show history. But the hour was saved by the final 10 minutes."

Alex Moaba of HuffPost wrote, "I will say that I'll be impressed with the writers' gumption - though not necessarily their wisdom - if they steer the show into the genuinely bizarre territory that would result from Deb and Dexter actually sleeping together. I don't think I can handle a will-they-or-won't-they storyline hanging over the show for its final season and a half." Television Without Pity gave the episode an "A–" grade.
