= The Dark... Whatever =

- Dexter episode
- Episode no.: Season 7 Episode 10
- Directed by: Michael Lehmann
- Written by: Lauren Gussis; Jace Richdale; Scott Reynolds
- Cinematography by: Jeffrey Jur
- Editing by: Louis Cioffi
- Original release date: December 2, 2012
- Running time: 54 minutes

Guest appearances
- Yvonne Strahovski as Hannah McKay (special guest star); Geoff Pierson as Thomas Matthews; Aimee Garcia as Jamie Batista; Jason Gedrick as George Novikov; Jim Beaver as Clint McKay; Katia Winter as Nadia

Episode chronology
← Previous "Helter Skelter"	Next → "Do You See What I See?"
- Dexter season 7

"The Dark... Whatever" is the tenth episode of the seventh season of the American crime drama television series Dexter. It is the 82nd overall episode of the series and was written by co-executive producer Lauren Gussis, co-executive producer Jace Richdale, and producer Scott Reynolds, and directed by Michael Lehmann. It originally aired on Showtime on December 2, 2012.

Set in Miami, the series centers on Dexter Morgan, a forensic technician specializing in bloodstain pattern analysis for the fictional Miami Metro Police Department, who leads a secret parallel life as a vigilante serial killer, hunting down murderers who have not been adequately punished by the justice system due to corruption or legal technicalities. In the episode, Hannah is visited by her estranged father Clint, who wants money from her. Dexter tries to help Hannah, while also helping Miami Metro in locating the Phantom Arsonist.

According to Nielsen Media Research, the episode was seen by an estimated 2.08 million household viewers and gained a 1.1 ratings share among adults aged 18–49. The episode received mixed reviews from critics, with many polarized over Dexter's decision to kill Clint.

== Plot ==
Miami Metro investigates another murder committed by the Phantom Arsonist. While inspecting a crime scene, Dexter (Michael C. Hall) notices that one of the detectives, Phil Bosso, behaves indifferently, and he wonders if he might be the Arsonist. However, he finds that Bosso simply participates in American Civil War reenactment activities, discarding him as the Arsonist.

Dexter talks with Hannah (Yvonne Strahovski) over his Dark Passenger, a concept that Hannah is unfamiliar with. Suddenly, they are surprised when Hannah's father Clint (Jim Beaver) arrives. Clint is also a criminal, having served in prison for check fraud. He was abusive to Hannah in her childhood, but claims to have changed, something that Hannah does not believe. Eventually, Hannah truly believes her father is seeking a new life, which includes moving to Louisiana, and decides to have him sleep at her house. However, Clint asks for $20,000 to start his new fishing business, which Dexter believes might be a scam. When Hannah does not comply, Clint turns aggressive and leaves.

Dexter later visits Hannah, who is heartbroken when she reveals that her father destroyed her greenhouse while drunk driving. Clint claims it was an accident, and insults Hannah, making her cry when he says he should have let her die when she was young. Dexter attacks Clint and forces him to leave. Quinn (Desmond Harrington) and Angel (David Zayas) break into the Fox Hole, after learning that George (Jason Gedrick) is sending Nadia (Katia Winter) to Dubai. When George hits Nadia, Quinn shoots and kills him. He then gets Nadia to shoot him with George's gun, staging it as self-defense and leading to his arrest. As the investigation ensues, Angel notes that the gap between the shots do not add up with Quinn's story.

LaGuerta (Lauren Vélez) has reduced her list of suspects to Dexter, and visits the Everglades cabin where Doakes died, accompanied by Matthews (Geoff Pierson). They learn that the cabin was owned by Santos Jimenez, and Matthews reveals that Jimenez was responsible for the murder of Dexter's mother, Laura Moser. He then reveals the shipping yard massacre, letting her know that Brian Moser was Dexter's brother. LaGuerta notes the pattern between the Butcher's blood slides and Dexter's job, and concludes that Doakes was getting close to him. Matthews downplays her theories, but offers to talk to Dexter himself. After the Phantom Arsonist strikes again in a bus, Dexter finds the message "It's Bobby" in the scene and deduces that the killer might have been in juvie. He checks criminal records, finding that Joe Jenson fits the description. He catches Jenson and prepares to kill him but stops short when he realizes his actions are due to childhood trauma. Instead, he leaves Jenson to be captured by the police, having promised Debra (Jennifer Carpenter) that he would not interfere.

Clint visits Dexter, trying to blackmail him for $20,000 or he will testify over Hannah's murder of a counselor. He reveals he has no fishing business, and that he was the one who talked to Sal Price about Hannah's background. As Hannah will not act against her father, Dexter takes matters into his own hands. He kidnaps Clint and takes him to the ocean, killing him and dropping his body. Dexter returns with Hannah and they both proclaim their love for each other. While Debra is content that Dexter left the Arsonist with her, she decides to investigate Hannah's possible role in the counselor's death, planning to contact Arlene Schram, the only witness key to the case.

== Production ==
=== Development ===
The episode was written by co-executive producer Lauren Gussis, co-executive producer Jace Richdale, and producer Scott Reynolds, and directed by Michael Lehmann. This was Gussis' 11th writing credit, Richdale's fourth writing credit, Reynolds' ninth writing credit, and Lehmann's second directing credit.

== Reception ==
=== Viewers ===
In its original American broadcast, "The Dark... Whatever" was seen by an estimated 2.08 million household viewers with a 1.1 in the 18–49 demographics. This means that 1.1 percent of all households with televisions watched the episode. This was a slight decrease in viewership from the previous episode, which was watched by an estimated 2.12 million household viewers with a 1.0 in the 18–49 demographics.

=== Critical reviews ===
"The Dark... Whatever" received mixed reviews from critics. Matt Fowler of IGN gave the episode a "good" 7.6 out of 10, and wrote, ""The Dark...Whatever" wasn't a bad episode (well, the Quinn/George part was), it's just that it was spoiled a bit by nine higher quality episodes that came before it. I think one's appreciation for the second half of the season, honestly, is going to depend on whether you're Team Deb or Team Hannah. Sorry, to break it all down under such paltry, Twilight-y terms, but I much preferred the introspective and honest scenes that Dex was having with Deb more than the ones he's having with Hannah. I don't mind getting to know Hannah at all, but we've seen Dexter introduce himself, and share his secrets, so many times over already. At the beginning of this season, in fact! And nothing can top the maelstrom that his openness caused with Deb."

Joshua Alston of The A.V. Club gave the episode a "D+" grade and wrote, "It's hard to believe there's another entire season of this thing, considering the developments of “The Dark... Whatever” seem to lend themselves to cuing up a series finale. The hardest thing to believe, though, is that Dexter's comeback season could derail in such a spectacular fashion." Kevin Fitzpatrick of ScreenCrush wrote, "As much as we've enjoyed the current season of Dexter, we're finding it more and more difficult to keep up with the rapid pace. Not only are Isaak, and now George no longer part of the story, but so too has the "Phantom Arsonist" been caught. With Hannah's father gone, it seems all we have left is Hannah herself, and LaGuerta's slow-boil investigation, but will they make for a satisfying conclusion to the season? Are there any real threats left?"

Richard Rys of Vulture gave the episode a 3 star rating out of 5 and wrote, "In a sense, Clint's death could be a hint about the show's endgame. Now that Dexter's killed his first innocent victim, maybe it will be easier to accept what could be a very ugly end to the series next year." Katy Waldman of Slate wrote, "It was almost a relief, I thought, because it allowed him that moment of grace with the arsonist, Joseph Jensen. But what are we to make of a codeless Dexter? Isn't he just like his brother Brian, the Ice Truck Killer, now?"

Drusilla Moorhouse of Zap2it wrote, "Deb, who was willing to "compromise the s*** out of" herself for Dexter, refuses to do the same for his girlfriend, and orders Angel Batista to find Arlene. While she waits, she pops a Xanax. Guess her brother being and dating a serial killer exceed the power of the good ol' treadmill to relieve her stress." Esther Gim of BuddyTV wrote, "If there was to be a huge reveal with Dexter's downfall, I see it not happening. Especially since the previews show Matthews telling Dexter what the theory is."

Billy Grifter of Den of Geek wrote, "Despite the great Jim Beaver appearance, and the progressions in both character and plots, I couldn't help feeling that Dexter was winding down and not up, as it should be with two episodes to go this season." Matt Richenthal of TV Fanatic gave the episode a 3 star rating out of 5 and wrote, "It's always a drag when an hour is filled with this long-time serial killer engaging in some profound self-examination, especially when the surrounding plot is so contrived and transparent."

Alex Moaba of HuffPost wrote, "So the battle lines are drawn. Deb is trying to break Dexter and Hannah up by sending Hannah to jail. LaGuerta and Matthews are closing in on Dexter. Who will protect who? This will get very interesting as the season plays out." Television Without Pity gave the episode a "C+" grade.
