= Chemistry (Dexter) =

- Dexter episode
- Episode no.: Season 7 Episode 7
- Directed by: Holly Dale
- Written by: Manny Coto; Karen Campbell
- Cinematography by: Jeffrey Jur
- Editing by: Louis Cioffi
- Original release date: November 11, 2012
- Running time: 53 minutes

Guest appearances
- Ray Stevenson as Isaak Sirko (special guest star); Yvonne Strahovski as Hannah McKay (special guest star); Aimee Garcia as Jamie Batista; Jason Gedrick as George Novikov; Santiago Cabrera as Sal Price; Katia Winter as Nadia; Julie Warner as Lori Kirkwood

Episode chronology
← Previous "Do the Wrong Thing"	Next → "Argentina"
- Dexter season 7

"Chemistry" is the seventh episode of the seventh season of the American crime drama television series Dexter. It is the 79th overall episode of the series and was written by executive producer Manny Coto and Karen Campbell, and directed by Holly Dale. It originally aired on Showtime on November 11, 2012.

Set in Miami, the series centers on Dexter Morgan, a forensic technician specializing in bloodstain pattern analysis for the fictional Miami Metro Police Department, who leads a secret parallel life as a vigilante serial killer, hunting down murderers who have not been adequately punished by the justice system due to corruption or legal technicalities. In the episode, Dexter tries to prevent Sal Price from finding crucial evidence against Hannah and himself, while Quinn realizes he will not escape the Koshka's influence.

According to Nielsen Media Research, the episode was seen by an estimated 2.01 million household viewers and gained a 1.1 ratings share among adults aged 18–49. The episode received positive reviews from critics, who praised the performances and character development, although some expressed disdain for Quinn's subplot.

== Plot ==
After having sex with Dexter (Michael C. Hall), Hannah (Yvonne Strahovski) puts the knife on his throat and questions him over his attempt to kill her, to which he explains that he only kills bad people. They both immediately become sexually aroused, she drops the knife and they have sex again. Dexter drops her off at her house and they both agree they should never see each other again.

The blood report on Isaak (Ray Stevenson) goes missing, which allows him to be released from prison. Angel (David Zayas) suspects Quinn (Desmond Harrington) is responsible, and admonishes him for ruining the case. Sal (Santiago Cabrera) gets Debra (Jennifer Carpenter) in touch with Lori Kirkwood (Julie Warner), the sister of Hannah's deceased husband, Jake. Debra wants to exhume Jake's body to determine cause of death, and discovers more about Hannah's past. Lori tells her that Jake died right after Hannah got pregnant; shortly thereafter, she had a miscarriage and abandoned Jake's family. Lori consents to the exhumation, but the coroner discovers that because Hannah had declined to have her husband embalmed, all that remains are bones without any tissue, making it impossible to find any trace of poison.

Debra confronts Dexter for falsifying Hannah's blood report to protect her, but he claims his test was correct. Sal stalks Hannah, wanting her to give an interview for his book, threatening to reveal that Dexter withheld evidence to protect her. Dexter and Hannah both tell each other that Sal is on to them, and Dexter decides to take care of the situation. He sneaks into Sal's apartment to delete all of Hannah's information. While Hannah has her interview with Sal, Dexter is approached by Isaak, who is being followed by Miami Metro. Isaak wants to know why he killed Viktor, prompting Dexter to explain in detail how he killed him. An angered Isaak leaves, intending to seek revenge eventually. Quinn is informed by George (Jason Gedrick) that he will not release Nadia (Katia Winter), and instead warns Quinn to step aside, threatening to expose that he was responsible for Isaak's release. Quinn takes the $10,000 and gives it to Angel, telling him to use it to buy his restaurant.

Sal arrives at Dexter's apartment for an interview, and Dexter threatens to frame him for an unsolved murder after stealing his DNA samples. Suddenly, Sal collapses and is pronounced dead. Debra suspects Hannah poisoned him and brings her over for interrogation, but she is forced to release her due to lack of evidence. Dexter later confronts Hannah, who confesses poisoning Sal through his pen. Dexter then reveals he destroyed all of Sal's research into Hannah, and asks about her pregnancy. She states that Jake was not content with it, and forced her to get an abortion or he would leave her. Despite her desire to have a family, she killed Jake, and later had her miscarriage. Dexter sympathizes with her, and they have sex. Debra runs a test on Sal's remains, but finds no sign of poison, which means Hannah cannot be prosecuted. Angered, she calls Dexter, giving him the go-ahead to kill Hannah.

== Production ==
=== Development ===
The episode was written by executive producer Manny Coto and Karen Campbell, and directed by Holly Dale. This was Coto's seventh writing credit, Campbell's third writing credit, and Dale's first directing credit.

== Reception ==
=== Viewers ===
In its original American broadcast, "Chemistry" was seen by an estimated 2.01 million household viewers with a 1.1 in the 18–49 demographics. This means that 1.1 percent of all households with televisions watched the episode. This was a slight increase in viewership from the previous episode, which was watched by an estimated 1.99 million household viewers with a 1.0 in the 18–49 demographics.

=== Critical reviews ===
"Chemistry" received positive reviews from critics. Matt Fowler of IGN gave the episode a "great" 8.4 out of 10, and wrote, "The lack of a single "big bad" this year, and a focus on Dexter and Deb's new uneasy partnership, has helped reinvigorate the show. But I'd like it if either the Hannah or Isaak arcs, or both, came to a close soon so not to get dragged out for the remaining five episodes this year. Plus, after all this time, I'd rather not get dragged back into the "Am I even capable of love?" topic, which feels asked and answered."

Joshua Alston of The A.V. Club gave the episode a "B–" grade and wrote, "The Dexter Redemption Express is beginning to sputter. That's not to say that season seven is suddenly a debacle; this season's ratio of hits to misses is still nearly unprecedented in the series' history. But the ascendancy of Hannah McKay has, at the very least, delayed the promise delivered by the first few episodes. What made the beginning of this season so auspicious was the much-needed sense of urgency, and the budding romance between Dexter and Hannah feels anything but urgent. It feels meandering and inessential, and because “Chemistry” focused so much on that relationship, the episode suffered for it." Kevin Fitzpatrick of ScreenCrush wrote, "We really are elated how Dexter's seventh season has managed to inject so much intrigue into a series that sputtered for two seasons after its peak. It certainly doesn't hurt that episodes like "Chemistry" don't mind calling attention to past characters like Lumen, Rita, or even Lilah in comparison of Yvonne Strahovski's Hannah, who feels more and more like a worthy addition to the series. Now that we're in the back stretch however, it's time for the blood to really spatter the fan."

Richard Rys of Vulture wrote, "One week, she's thinking live and let kill; the next, she's ready to buy her brother a new set of knives for a proper Hannah carving. What she doesn't realize is that Hannah is what Dexter wants to do. So as Dexter's lethal instinct wavers, Deb indulges her dark side. It's likely a short-lived switch, though. Dexter talking love, Deb green-lighting murder — that's not what the Morgans do." Katy Waldman of Slate wrote, "There are so many silent crime scenes in this episode: The Colombian bar where the homicide team can't recover any evidence, the desiccated skeleton of Jake, Hannah's husband, Sal's negative tox screen. Plus the imaginary crime scene Dexter plans to create with Sal Price’s DNA. I'm not sure what any of this means, thematically, but it did strike me that physical evidence was failing the show's characters in a major way this episode — or at least, failing the truth."

Drusilla Moorhouse of Zap2it wrote, "isn't Deb's request that he kill Hannah proof of her own acceptance? Does he dare disappoint her, even at the risk of his own happiness?" Esther Gim of BuddyTV wrote, "Has Deb finally accepted Dexter for all that he is? It sure seems like it when she all but explicitly tells Dexter to kill Hannah for poisoning her love interest to death."

Nick Harley of Den of Geek wrote, "With other plot elements, like Isaak's pending revenge, Deb's discovery and LaGuerta's curiosity in the Bay Harbor Butcher case, the addition of Hannah McKay only distracts from the other storylines that have more potential, and wastes time retreading over familiar ground." Matt Richenthal of TV Fanatic gave the episode a 4.4 star rating out of 5 and wrote, "Looking way ahead, with all these seeds being planted, I can legitimately say I have no idea where the series is headed to close out this season and then the final eighth one."

Alex Moaba of HuffPost wrote, "It was clear from the moment Sal Price saw Dexter dropping off Hannah at her apartment that he had to go. The same is probably true for Hannah, but it won't be as easy for Dexter to kill Hannah as it was for Hannah to kill Price. Still, it seems more likely that the code - and his relationship with Deb - will win out over his new love." Television Without Pity gave the episode a "B+" grade.
