= Surprise, Motherfucker! =

- Dexter episode
- Debra Morgan (Jennifer Carpenter) mourns over María LaGuerta's (Lauren Vélez) body after killing her to protect her brother Dexter Morgan (Michael C. Hall).
- Episode no.: Season 7 Episode 12
- Directed by: Steve Shill
- Written by: Scott Buck; Tim Schlattmann
- Cinematography by: Jeffrey Jur
- Editing by: Keith Henderson
- Original release date: December 16, 2012
- Running time: 56 minutes

Guest appearances
- Yvonne Strahovski as Hannah McKay (special guest star); Erik King as James Doakes; Geoff Pierson as Thomas Matthews; Aimee Garcia as Jamie Batista; Nestor Serrano as Hector Estrada; Nicole LaLiberte as Arlene Schram

Episode chronology
← Previous "Do You See What I See?"	Next → "A Beautiful Day"
- Dexter season 7

"Surprise, Motherfucker!" (otherwise censored as "Surprise, Motherf**ker!" in distribution) is the twelfth episode and season finale of the seventh season of the American crime drama television series Dexter. It is the 72nd overall episode of the series and was written by executive producers Scott Buck and Tim Schlattmann, and directed by Steve Shill. It originally aired on Showtime on December 16, 2012.

Set in Miami, the series centers on Dexter Morgan, a forensic technician specializing in bloodstain pattern analysis for the fictional Miami Metro Police Department, who leads a secret parallel life as a vigilante serial killer, hunting down murderers who have not been adequately punished by the justice system due to corruption or legal technicalities. In the episode, LaGuerta arrests Dexter for Hector Estrada's murder, while wanting the precinct to accept her theory that he is the Bay Harbor Butcher.

According to Nielsen Media Research, the episode was seen by an estimated 2.75 million household viewers and gained a 1.4 ratings share among adults aged 18–49. This made it the most watched episode of the series, as well as the most watched episode for a Showtime original series. The episode received highly positive reviews from critics, who praised Jennifer Carpenter's performance, closure to LaGuerta's storyline, tone and shocking ending.

== Plot ==
Dexter (Michael C. Hall) visits Hannah (Yvonne Strahovski), where she confesses that she poisoned Debra (Jennifer Carpenter) to prevent her from separating them. She states she will not expose Dexter's secret, but laments his betrayal. After he leaves, she calls Arlene (Nicole LaLiberte) for her help.

Dexter returns to his apartment, playing with Harrison and Jamie (Aimee Garcia). Suddenly, LaGuerta (Lauren Vélez) appears with two officers, arresting Dexter for the murder of Hector Estrada. While Jamie protests, Dexter complies and allows himself to be handcuffed. He is taken to the station, where everyone is shocked to see him. Angel (David Zayas) and Debra defend Dexter, but LaGuerta takes him to an interrogation room. LaGuerta accuses him of Estrada's murder through photos, but Dexter debunks her theories, telling her that she cannot let go of the idea that James Doakes was the Bay Harbor Butcher. Masuka (C. S. Lee) appears, stating that he ran blood found on Estrada's shirt on a garbage dump, discovering that it was the shirt he used 40 years ago, which was only kept in the evidence room. The shirt also contains LaGuerta's fingerprints, and Dexter is released after they conclude she is framing him.

In flashbacks, Dexter and Doakes (Erik King) are seen in good terms during an investigation on a prostitute's murder. During this, LaGuerta returns a key to Doakes, signaling the end of their relationship, disappointing him. When another prostitute is killed, Dexter and Doakes are sent to the crime scene. Dexter begins to re-enact the scene with delight, which disturbs Doakes. Some time later, the prime suspect disappears, frustrating Doakes. When Dexter says a quote from the suspect's journal, Doakes is taken aback, as the journal was with him the whole time. Doakes calls Dexter "one creep motherfucker" and accuses him of hiding something, telling Dexter he intends to find out someday what it is.

Dexter confesses to Debra that he sabotaged LaGuerta's investigation, and he must kill Estrada before he identifies him. He starts following his ex-wife, hoping she can lead him to Estrada. Matthews (Geoff Pierson) reprimands LaGuerta for her actions, warning her that she is now under investigation. LaGuerta talks to Debra, apologizing. However, LaGuerta shows her a security footage video of Debra at a gas station on the night of Travis Marshall's death. LaGuerta is now aware that she is helping Dexter, and promises to take them down. Debra attends Hannah's court hearing, where she is charged with murder. Arlene embraces Hannah on her way out, passing her a pill. On the way to prison, Hannah has a seizure, forcing the officers to take her to a hospital. Awakening, she escapes when her officers leave the room.

Dexter sneaks into LaGuerta's house, finding that she wants to track his and Debra's move on the night of Travis' death. Harry (James Remar) suggests running away, but Dexter decides that he must kill LaGuerta. Estrada contacts LaGuerta to meet him at the shipping yard, but he is actually forced by Dexter to lure her. After hanging up, Dexter kills him. Debra attends Angel's New Year's Eve party at his restaurant, but discovers that Dexter has tricked LaGuerta to the shipping yard. Realizing he will kill her, she is forced to leave the party when he does not answer his phone. Hannah goes to Dexter's apartment, leaving him a plant and leaving.

LaGuerta arrives at a shipping container, where she sees Estrada's corpse before Dexter sneaks up behind her and sedates her. Dexter then begins to stage the scene, wherein it will appear like LaGuerta and Estrada shot each other. Debra suddenly arrives, pointing her gun at Dexter and telling him she will not let him go through with killing LaGuerta. LaGuerta regains consciousness, telling Debra to kill Dexter. Dexter drops his knife and tells Debra to do what she has to do. Shaken, Debra shoots LaGuerta, killing her. She then cries while embracing her body. Dexter and Debra return to Angel's party, as Dexter's narration wonders what happens now that he and Debra broke their own rules. His voiceover concludes, "Who is Deb now? Who am I? Is this a new beginning? Or the beginning of the end?"

== Production ==
=== Development ===
The episode was written by executive producers Scott Buck and Tim Schlattmann, and directed by Steve Shill. This was Buck's 16th writing credit, Schlattmann's 14th writing credit, and Shill's 11th directing credit.

== Reception ==
=== Viewers ===
In its original American broadcast, "Surprise, Motherfucker!" was seen by an estimated 2.75 million household viewers with a 1.4 in the 18–49 demographics. This means that 1.4 percent of all households with televisions watched the episode. This was a 5% increase in viewership from the previous episode, which was watched by an estimated 2.60 million household viewers with a 1.3 in the 18–49 demographics.

=== Critical reviews ===
"Surprise, Motherfucker!" received highly positive reviews from critics. Matt Fowler of IGN gave the episode an "amazing" 9.4 out of 10, and wrote, "That final scene. Wow. With Deb walking in on Dexter, gun drawn, in the midst of another murder. Shades of the premiere. And Dexter echoing Hannah's acceptance of death. In that moment, Dexter, for the first time, acted in a totally selfless manner; willing to die to save the "goodness" in Deb. But when the shot rang out, he was spared, and LaGuerta was done."

Joshua Alston of The A.V. Club gave the episode a "C–" grade and wrote, "After the frescoes, the tableaux, the “Hello, whore” and the cult-bumpkin Jordana Spiro of last season, I can say that I came out of that season more excited about the show than I went into it. And here, the opposite is true, and it seems Dexter's shot at redemption may have only lasted half a season. Surprise indeed!"

Alan Sepinwall of HitFix wrote, "Ultimately, though, there was much more good than bad in this season, and assuming everyone sticks to the plan for next year to be the last, I'm hopeful that the creative team will take even more of a damn the torpedoes approach than they did this year." Kevin Fitzpatrick of ScreenCrush wrote, "We can't say that "Surprise, Motherf---er" proved as explosive as last year's finale, but it did create an intriguing dynamic for the final season next September. Deb's murder of LaGuerta will surely have some huge emotional ramifications, but it didn't seem very climactic, nor did it justify some of the weaker points of the season. At the very least, Yvonne Strahovski's Hannah McKay will likely return in some capacity, as we await news of how the final season will unfold."

Richard Rys of Vulture gave the episode a perfect 5 star rating out of 5 and wrote, "Now, that's how you finish a season. Cliff-hangers can be fun in a masochistic way, like waiting months wondering how Deb would react after seeing Dexter kill Travis Marshall. Last night wasn't so much a cliff-hanger as it was the end of a mostly terrific chapter. Though we have more questions than answers, there's also a sense of satisfaction." Katy Waldman of Slate wrote, "By targeting LaGuerta, a true innocent, Dex slid to the bottom of a slippery slope that has beckoned him since day one. What's surprising is that he took Deb with him. I did not see her murder of LaGuerta coming, and am not sure how I feel about it."

Drusilla Moorhouse of Zap2it wrote, "This isn't going to be easy to explain when Dexter returns for its eighth and final season. What do you think is in store for the Morgans? Will they face the music... or meet up with Hannah in Argentina?" Esther Gim of BuddyTV wrote, "The season 7 finale of Dexter, titled "Surprise, Mother******!" isn't just the phrase uttered by Doakes in a few flashbacks - which, by the way, seems out of place, so if you have a reasoning for its purpose, please let me know - but at the end, it feels more like the show tells us as viewers, surprise! Because I sure didn't see that coming."

Nick Harley of Den of Geek wrote, "So with LaGuerta out of the picture and the Morgans' bound tighter than ever, what else could possibly lie in wait for Dexter? With only one season left, will Hannah become the final loose end that forms a noose for Dexter or will someone notice the framing of LaGuerta's murder; like the newly retired Batista? With no solid cliffhanger like last season, there's really no other questions left to be asked." Miranda Wicker of TV Fanatic gave the episode a 4 star rating out of 5 and wrote, "Whoa. WHOA. For what has been a ridiculously slow season, the Dexter Season 7 finale, "Surprise, Motherf--ker," sure did end things with a bang instead of a whimper."

Alex Moaba of HuffPost wrote, "Perhaps this moment will represent a turning point for the show. It's hard to imagine Dexter and Deb getting out of next season as a happy-go-lucky sibling vigilante team. According to the show's own mythology, they've crossed a line. As Harry warned Dexter, LaGuerta didn't even come close to fitting the code. Next season, they pretty much have to go down, and that will be fascinating to watch." Television Without Pity gave the episode an "A" grade.
