= Do the Wrong Thing =

Do the Wrong Thing may refer to:

- Do the Wrong Thing (Dexter), an episode of the American television series Dexter
- Do the Wrong Thing (The Simpsons), an episode of the American television series The Simpsons
