= Do You See What I See? =

Do You See What I See? may refer to:

- Do You See What I See? (album), a 2006 album by Todd Agnew
- "Do You See What I See?" (song), a 1987 song by Hunters & Collectors
- "Do You See What I See?" (Dexter), an episode of the American television series Dexter

== See also ==
- "Do You Hear What I Hear?", a song
