= Dexter season 7 =

Drama series

Dexter
- Season 7
- DVD cover
- Showrunner: Scott Buck
- Starring: Michael C. Hall; Jennifer Carpenter; Desmond Harrington; C. S. Lee; Lauren Vélez; David Zayas; James Remar
- No. of episodes: 12

Release
- Original network: Showtime
- Original release: September 30 – December 16, 2012

Season chronology
- ← Previous; Season 6 Next → Season 8

The seventh season of Dexter premiered on September 30, 2012. The season follows Dexter's tangles with a Ukrainian mob boss and introduces the character Hannah McKay, a mysterious widow with a green thumb and a checkered past. The season seven story arc is continued over the course of the eighth season, which premiered on June 30, 2013.

== Development ==
On November 21, 2011, Showtime renewed Dexter for both a seventh and eighth season, each consisting of 12 episodes. Showtime officially announced that the seventh season would premiere Sunday, September 30, 2012. These two seasons feature a story arc spanning across both seasons. The premiere episode of Season 7 featured a flashback to Debra and Dexter's childhood. On April 24, it was confirmed that Ray Stevenson would guest star in the upcoming Season 7, and he would play the head of a Ukrainian crime syndicate who arrives in Miami determined to find out who killed one of his associates. Jason Gedrick appears in a multi-episode arc playing the manager of a Miami-area gentlemen’s club that is linked to a high-profile murder case. Yvonne Strahovski, known for starring in the NBC television series Chuck, joined Dexter as Hannah McKay, a woman with a checkered past who arrives to help Miami Metro Homicide reopen an old murder case out of mutual benefit, and becomes Dexter's new love interest.

== Cast ==
=== Main ===
- Michael C. Hall as Dexter Morgan
- Jennifer Carpenter as Debra Morgan
- Desmond Harrington as Joey Quinn
- C. S. Lee as Vince Masuka
- Lauren Vélez as María LaGuerta
- David Zayas as Angel Batista
- James Remar as Harry Morgan

=== Special guest ===
- Yvonne Strahovski as Hannah McKay
- Ray Stevenson as Isaak Sirko

=== Recurring ===
- Aimee Garcia as Jamie Batista
- Jason Gedrick as George Novikov
- Dana L. Wilson as Angie Miller
- Andrew Kirsanov as Jurg Yeliashkevych
- Katia Winter as Nadia
- Francisco Viana as Jake Simms
- Geoff Pierson as Tom Matthews
- Josh Cooke as Louis Greene
- Santiago Cabrera as Sal Price
- Matt Gerald as Ray Speltzer
- Nicole LaLiberte as Arlene Schram
- Brett Rickaby as Phil Bosso
- Nestor Serrano as Hector Estrada
- Billy Brown as Mike Anderson

=== Guest ===
- Preston Bailey as Cody Bennett
- Christina Robinson as Astor Bennett
- Enver Gjokaj as Viktor Baskov
- Daniel Buran as Wayne Randall
- Beth Grant as Donna Randall
- Karl Herlinger as Oleg Mickic
- Sherman Augustus as Benjamin Caffrey
- Jim Beaver as Clint McKay
- Erik King as James Doakes

== Episodes ==
No. overall	No. in season	Title	Directed by	Written by	Original release date	U.S. viewers (millions)
73	1	"Are You...?"	John Dahl	Scott Buck	September 30, 2012	2.40
After witnessing Dexter kill Travis Marshall, a shocked and reluctant Debra helps him cover up the murder by setting fire to the church. The following night, Detective Mike Anderson is murdered by a member of the Ukrainian mafia after finding a dead prostitute in his trunk. Dexter identifies the murderer as Viktor Baskov (Enver Gjokaj) and later kills him. Quinn and Batista begin to make amends as they investigate the Anderson and prostitute murders. Meanwhile, Louis Greene hacks into Dexter's computer and cancels all his credit cards as the first phase of his revenge against Dexter. LaGuerta begins investigating a blood slide Dexter accidentally left at the church. Increasingly suspicious of Dexter, Debra ransacks his apartment and discovers his knives and blood slides, forcing Dexter to admit to her that he is a serial killer.
74	2	"Sunshine and Frosty Swirl"	Steve Shill	Manny Coto	October 7, 2012	2.10
Dexter reveals to Debra that he is the true Bay Harbor Butcher and tells her of the code Harry taught him. Dexter moves in with Debra so she can monitor him. Dexter discovers Louis was the one who cancelled his credit cards and confronts him. While investigating Mike Anderson's murder, Quinn flirts with a Russian stripper named Nadia (Katia Winter). LaGuerta secretly investigates the blood slide, comparing it to the slides from the Bay Harbor Butcher case. Meanwhile, Ukrainian mob boss, Isaak Sirko (Ray Stevenson), arrives in Miami to look for Viktor Baskov. Wayne Randall (Daniel Buran), a spree killer responsible for a string of murders committed 15 years prior, decides to reveal where he buried his victims.
75	3	"Buck the System"	Stefan Schwartz	Jace Richdale	October 14, 2012	1.98
Miami Metro begins investigating Hannah McKay, Wayne Randall's ex-girlfriend and former partner in crime. Meanwhile, Dexter informs Debra that Ray Speltzer (Matt Gerald), a suspect in two murders, is likely going to kill again. Isaak learns that Viktor's last location was the marina where Dexter's boat is and investigates, finding Louis attempting to sabotage Dexter's boat. After learning the boat is Dexter's, Isaak kills Louis. Debra follows Speltzer to an abandoned house and waits outside but is forced to get involved when Speltzer traps his latest victim in a Minotauran labyrinth he's constructed inside. Ray attempts to kill Debra but Dexter arrives in time to save her. Speltzer escapes, but not before killing the woman he'd lured inside.
76	4	"Run"	John Dahl	Wendy West	October 21, 2012	2.18
Speltzer is arrested by police and confesses to the murders, but his case is dismissed on a technicality and he is released. As Dexter pursues Speltzer, he is captured and trapped in Speltzer's labyrinth, but manages to escape. Meanwhile, Isaak convinces the club's bartender to be a scapegoat for Anderson's murder to get the police off his and the Koshka's backs. Hannah McKay visits Miami Metro to help with the investigation of Wayne Randall's murders. Dexter finally captures Speltzer and kills him inside a crematorium before cremating his body along with his box of blood slides.
77	5	"Swim Deep"	Ernest Dickerson	Scott Reynolds	October 28, 2012	2.28
Isaak Sirko seeks revenge against Dexter for Viktor Baskov's death. Meanwhile, LaGuerta tells Debra of her suspicions that the Bay Harbor Butcher is alive and active, and asks for Debra's help with the case. Hannah McKay leads the police to the bodies of a couple killed by Wayne Randall, but Dexter realizes one of them was murdered by Hannah herself. Isaak is arrested and jailed after Dexter lures him into a shoot-out at a rival Colombian bar. Dexter visits Isaak in prison where Isaak tells a story of long-sought revenge. Later, Debra shows Dexter a photo of him that would connect Dexter to a previous Bay Harbor Butcher murder. She asks to not know or be a part of any of his future killings. Dexter burns the photo.
78	6	"Do the Wrong Thing"	Alik Sakharov	Lauren Gussis	November 4, 2012	1.99
Dexter continues to investigate Hannah McKay, suspecting that she may have murdered her late husband. Wanting to kill Hannah, Dexter sabotages the case against her, lying on the blood report and not testing for Hannah's blood at the crime scene. Sal Price (Santiago Cabrera), a true crime writer, approaches Miami Metro for case files on the last Wayne Randall murders, as he is writing a book about Hannah. Dexter later breaks into Sal's apartment to copy all of the digital files he has on Hannah. In them they reveal that Hannah poisoned the woman who bequeathed her a greenhouse business. Meanwhile, the Koshka Brotherhood blackmails Quinn by threatening to hurt Nadia so he will remove evidence linking Isaak to the murder scene at the Colombian bar. LaGuerta continues to probe into the Bay Harbor Butcher case. Debra finds out that Dexter was not completely truthful in the blood report on the Wayne Randall murders. Dexter takes Hannah out on a date where he intends to kill her, securing her to his kill table but ends up freeing her before the two have sex.
79	7	"Chemistry"	Holly Dale	Manny Coto & Karen Campbell	November 11, 2012	2.01
Isaak is released from prison, but Debra has him followed everywhere. Quinn tries to free Nadia from the clutches of Koshka's but they decline despite Quinn destroying evidence for them. Meanwhile, Sal Price discovers Dexter's relationship with Hannah and tries to get information from him. Dexter decides to blackmail Price into silence by framing him for an unsolved murder he once investigated. However, Price dies suddenly following an interview with Hannah (who poisoned him to protect herself). Debra brings Hannah in for questioning over Price's death but Hannah denies everything. Dexter confronts Hannah about poisoning Sal. She assures him it's untraceable. Dexter tells Hannah he broke into Sal's apartment for blackmail evidence and while doing so deleted the book Sal was writing on her. Quinn donates the $10,000 of Koshka payoff money to Batista's struggling restaurant. Unable to connect Hannah to Price's death and feeling frustrated, Debra asks Dexter to kill Hannah.
80	8	"Argentina"	Romeo Tirone	Arika Lisanne Mittman	November 18, 2012	2.25
Dexter refuses Debra's request to kill Hannah. Meanwhile, Isaak escapes his police surveillance and attempts to kill Dexter again, but fails. Astor, Cody, and Harrison's grandfather needs surgery, so the three children come to stay with Debra in Miami. During a meal at Batista's restaurant, Dexter and Debra discover Astor has been smoking marijuana and confront her about it. Feeling he is out of control in his mission to avenge Viktor's death, the Koshka Brotherhood puts a hit on Isaak. LaGuerta finds a potential link between Dexter and the Bay Harbor Butcher at a nearby marina. Dexter breaks into Isaak's apartment only to encounter a Koshka hitman already there. Dexter kills the hitman, later found by Isaak who now understands a hit has been put out on him. Quinn is blackmailed into helping the Koshka Brotherhood in the future. Debra learns that Dexter and Hannah are seeing each other and, during a conversation with Dexter, reveals her romantic feelings for him. Dexter tracks Isaak to a gay bar where Isaak reveals to Dexter the reason he is trying to kill him: Isaak and Viktor were lovers.
81	9	"Helter Skelter"	Steve Shill	Tim Schlattmann	November 25, 2012	2.12
The Koshka Brotherhood hires two hitmen to find and kill Isaak. Isaak asks for Dexter's help but Dexter declines. Desperate, Isaak kidnaps Hannah and has her held in an unknown location in order to enlist Dexter's help to protect him. Dexter agrees. Isaak promises Dexter that will give up trying to kill him in exchange for Dexter's help in killing both hitmen. Meanwhile, Batista and the rest of Miami Metro deal with a series of arson/murders with an unknown perpetrator nicknamed the Phantom Arsonist. LaGuerta enlists the help of ex-Deputy Chief Matthews in her new Bay Harbor Butcher investigation. Quinn shows up at the Foxhole and confronts George Novikov (Jason Gedrick). Quinn beats George in a rage before leaving the Foxhole with Nadia. Dexter and Isaak work together and kill both hit men. After Isaak and Dexter come to an understanding about Viktor's death, Isaak is shot by George Novikov, the manager of the Foxhole. Hannah is held in captivity by Isaak's bodyguard Jurg and attempts to escape. In the ensuing struggle, she succeeds in killing Jurg by bludgeoning him to death with a lamp, but not before he stabs her in the abdomen. Debra manages to find an injured and unconscious Hannah after a tip from Dexter and has her taken to a hospital. Dexter takes the injured Isaak out to sea, to the same spot he dumped Viktor's body. The two discuss their own similarities and their love for their respective love interests before Isaak dies. Dexter visits Hannah in the hospital and confesses that he fears losing her.
82	10	"The Dark… Whatever"	Michael Lehmann	Lauren Gussis & Jace Richdale & Scott Reynolds	December 2, 2012	2.08
The Phantom Arsonist continues his spree across Miami. Hannah's estranged ex-con father Clint McKay (guest star Jim Beaver) shows up unexpectedly, giving Hannah a childhood relic that only disturbs her. Clint asks for money for a crawfish business. Dexter and Hannah tell Clint no and Clint leaves in a rage. Clint returns later drunk, crashing his truck into Hannah's greenhouse. Dexter identifies the Phantom, but decides to hand him over to the department instead of killing him as Dexter promised to Debra. Discovering that George plans to send Nadia to a sex club in Dubai, Quinn confronts George at the Foxhole club. George holds Quinn and Nadia at gunpoint and begins punching Nadia in the face. Enraged, Quinn shoots and kills him, then has Nadia shoot him with George's gun to falsify a motive. Batista, outside the room of the shooting, knows that the timeline doesn't add up. Meanwhile, LaGuerta and Matthews discover another connection between Dexter and the Bay Harbor Butcher murders. Dexter kills Hannah's father after learning it was Clint who told Sal Price all of the details for his books on Hannah, and was using another secret to blackmail Dexter.
83	11	"Do You See What I See?"	John Dahl	Manny Coto & Wendy West	December 9, 2012	2.60
Dexter and Debra plant evidence to steer LaGuerta and Matthews' investigation away from Dexter. The plant works on Matthews, who tells LaGuerta she needs to recognize Doakes as the Bay Harbor Butcher and quits the case. LaGuerta is still not convinced. Meanwhile, Hector Estrada (Nestor Serrano), the last surviving killer of Dexter's mother, is unexpectedly released on parole. Dexter begins plotting to kill him. Batista decides it's time to retire to run his restaurant. Debra meets with Arlene Schram (Nicole LaLiberte), a witness to one of Hannah's early murders, and asks her to testify against Hannah. After Arlene tells Hannah about this, Debra has a car accident, and Dexter realizes that Hannah had drugged her. Dexter attempts to kill Estrada, but discovers that he's been set up by LaGuerta who had pressured the parole board to release Hector early. Dexter barely escapes but so does Hector, who now knows who Dexter is. Dexter decides to give Debra evidence incriminating Hannah for Sal Price's murder, resulting in Hannah's arrest.
84	12	"Surprise, Motherfucker!"	Steve Shill	Scott Buck & Tim Schlattmann	December 16, 2012	2.75
Dexter visits Hannah in prison, where she admits to poisoning Debra. Hannah later manages to escape custody with a little help from Arlene. Meanwhile, LaGuerta finds Dexter at home and arrests him. The department is shocked as they take Dexter in cuffs to interrogate. LaGuerta lays out her evidence but is thwarted as Dexter planted it and made it look like LaGuerta framed him. Dexter finds Hector Estrada's ex-wife and tails her to find Hector. Matthews confronts LaGuerta and tells her to apologize to Dexter. LaGuerta confronts Debra with a surveillance video implicating her in Travis Marshall's death that was originally lost. Debra lies to LaGuerta. Dexter breaks into LaGuerta's house and finds a warrant that would tie Debra and himself to Travis Marshall's murder. Dexter decides that the only way out is to kill LaGuerta. He finds and kills Estrada, then lures LaGuerta to the scene to kill her. Worried, Debra leaves Batista's New Years' party, tracking LaGuerta's location and walks in on Dexter about to kill an unconscious LaGuerta next to Estrada's body. As Debra attempts to dissuade Dexter from killing LaGuerta, she comes to and urges Debra to shoot Dexter, but Debra shoots and kills LaGuerta instead.
