= Storm of Fuck =

- Dexter: New Blood episode
- Episode no.: Episode 2
- Directed by: Marcos Siega
- Written by: Warren Hsu Leonard
- Cinematography by: Hillary Fyfe Spera
- Editing by: Perri Frank
- Original air date: November 14, 2021
- Running time: 52 minutes

Guest appearances
- Fredric Lehne as Edward Olsen; Gregory Cruz as Abraham Brown; David Magidoff as Teddy; Michael Cyril Creighton as Fred Jr.; Gizel Jiménez as Tess

Episode chronology
← Previous "Cold Snap"	Next → "Smoke Signals"

"Storm of Fuck" is the second episode of the American television miniseries Dexter: New Blood, a continuation of the series Dexter. The episode was written by consulting producer Warren Hsu Leonard and directed by executive producer Marcos Siega. It originally aired on Showtime on November 14, 2021, being also available on its streaming service at midnight on the same day.

The series follows Dexter Morgan after faking his death on the original series finale. Dexter now lives in the fictional small town of Iron Lake, New York, hiding his identity under the name of Jim Lindsay, a local shopkeeper and having suppressed his killing urges. He is now in a relationship with Angela Bishop, the town's chief of police, and is beloved and respected in the town. A local troublemaker and the arrival of a mysterious person cause friction in his new life, as the past comes back to haunt him. In the episode, Matt Caldwell's disappearance prompts an investigation near Dexter's cabin, worrying him that they will incriminating evidence. Dexter also tries to connect with his son after he decides to stay with him. The episode marks the first appearance of Clancy Brown as Kurt Caldwell, the main antagonist.

According to Nielsen Media Research, the episode was seen by an estimated 0.560 million household viewers and gained a 0.12 ratings share among adults aged 18–49. The episode received mixed-to-positive reviews from critics. Critics praised the acting, the scenes between Dexter and Harrison and welcomed Brown's debut but others criticized the pace, tone, momentum and Debra's role in the episode.

== Plot ==
Dexter (Michael C. Hall) talks with Harrison (Jack Alcott) at his cabin. Harrison reveals that Hannah died three years ago due to pancreatic cancer, and he found a letter that Dexter sent to Hannah, which is clear he didn't die. Harrison was sent to foster homes in Miami but managed to get to Oregon and track down "Jim Lindsay." Dexter allows him to sleep at his cabin, despite being tormented by Debra (Jennifer Carpenter), saying that he will screw up Harrison's life.

The next day, Dexter notices blood trails outside his cabin from when he killed Matt and begins to cover it up. However, the police arrive, which includes Angela (Julia Jones). Angela informs him that Matt's disappearance in the surrounding areas is prompting a search party. They want to use his cabin as a camp, which Dexter accepts. Angela also meets Harrison, who covers for Dexter by claiming to be "Jim Lindsay's son." Dexter helps in the investigation, which is actually a ruse in order to dispose of evidence incriminating him. He also throws one of Matt's gloves near a highway. Authorities find the dead deer, and Angela gets into a conflict with the Seneca people in the area, as the area falls under their forests. One of them calls out Angela for giving priority to Matt instead of searching for their missing people.

After getting a helicopter from Olsen (Fredric Lehne) to help with their investigation, Angela talks with Dexter. She is actually happy with Harrison's return. Angela reveals that her daughter Audrey (Johnny Sequoyah) has actually been adopted, suggesting to Dexter that he should enroll him in high school and prepare him for his future. Harrison joins a search party consisting of high schoolers and bonds with Audrey. He helps them break into a locked cabin, where they smoke and question Harrison's life. When Harrison leaves, a few kids lurk into his backpack, finding out that he constantly draws. Harrison watches them from afar, but he does not bring it up.

During the episode, Lily, a girl whom Angela helped in the previous episode, is shown drinking and throwing up in her hotel room. While all this happens, a hidden camera is revealed in the room, with an unknown man watching her from his laptop. After realizing that she can't escape from the room, Lily eventually discovers the camera, which also has the words "You're already dead" written below it, presumably with blood.

Angela concludes that Matt shot the deer and escaped through the highway as the act was illegal in the area, calming Dexter as the investigation seems to be over at his house. She then gets into a heated argument with Audrey for having left without notice. Later that night, Harrison asks Dexter why he left him. He reveals Dexter’s letter to Hannah, telling her to write him if Harrison shows "dark tendencies." Dexter reveals that he left because of his past demons, hiding his secret life from Harrison. He promises to be a better father to Harrison, and he agrees to stay for some time.

As the police authorities start leaving, Matt's father, Kurt (Clancy Brown), arrives at the scene. When Angela informs him of Matt's "actions", he doesn't believe it, as Matt would've contacted him. He then asks the authorities to continue looking for his son, citing that he helped them with his truck service. Angela decides to continue the investigation in the area, pleasing Kurt. Kurt meets with Dexter and Harrison, stating that he will find Matt. It's revealed that Matt's body parts are hidden beneath the firepit outside of Dexter's cabin.

== Production ==
=== Development ===
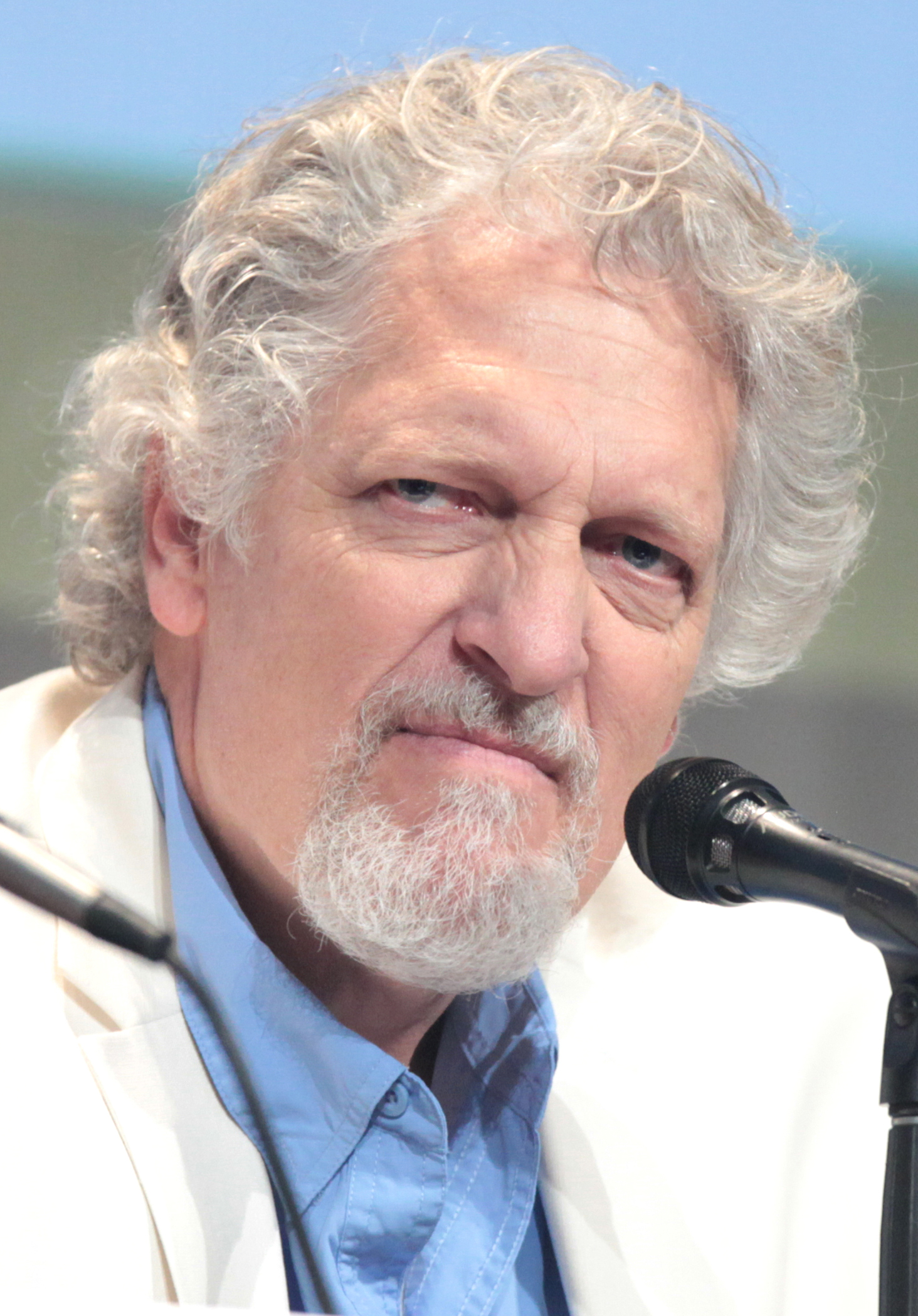
Clancy Brown debuts in the episode as Kurt Caldwell, the new antagonist.

In November 2021, it was announced that the second episode of the revived series would be titled "Storm of Fuck", and was directed by Marcos Siega and written by Warren Hsu Leonard.

=== Casting ===
In January 2021, Clancy Brown joined the main cast as Kurt Caldwell, "Caldwell was born and raised in the town of Iron Lake. In fact, some consider him the unofficial mayor of their small town. He's realized the American dream by going from driving big rigs, just like his father did, to now owning several trucks and the local truck stop. Powerful, generous, loved by everyone – he's a true man of the people. If he's got your back, consider yourself blessed. But should you cross Kurt, or hurt anyone that he cares for... God help you." Brown never watched the original series but the COVID-19 pandemic prompted him to look for a new acting job. Once he got the role, he watched the series, saying, "They had this overarching theme that they were exploring and I liked that idea. I don't think this is any different. They're doing that same thing. I don't know why everybody was so upset with the ending. I thought it was okay."

== Reception ==
=== Viewers ===
In its original American broadcast, "Storm of Fuck" was seen by an estimated 0.560 million household viewers and gained a 0.12 ratings share among adults aged 18–49, according to Nielsen Media Research. This means that 0.12 percent of all households with televisions watched the episode. This was a 12% decrease in viewership from the previous episode, which was watched by 0.678 million viewers with a 0.20 in the 18-49 demographics.

=== Critical reviews ===
"Storm of Fuck" received mixed-to-positive reviews from critics. Matt Fowler of IGN gave the episode an "okay" 6 out of 10 and wrote in his verdict, "While the Dexter: New Blood premiere seemed to open up new avenues of the story, the second episode shut down a few streets, making it feel like this miniseries wasn't going to stretch its wings as far out as it could. Harrison is already a tricky character, straddling the line between innocent kid abandoned by his dad and a troublemaking teen out to wreck Dexter's life. Ghost Deb's warnings to Dexter about him making the same old mistakes as before feel dire for the series this early on, so let's hope this is all still just a jumping off point."

Joshua Alston of The A.V. Club gave the episode a "C+" grade and wrote, "Sure, it's all kind of silly, but it's silly in precisely the way Dexter is at its best. There's still fun to be had in watching Dexter hide his crimes against the world's worst people from the world's worst detectives. And yes, this version of that is like macaroni and cheese from a microwaveable tray rather than from a glass baking tray, but it's still pretty comforting in its own right. Too bad, then, that so little else of 'Storm Of Fuck' works because I'm still so confused as to what Jim Lindsay's whole deal is supposed to be."

Kelly McClure of Vulture gave the episode a 3 star out of 5 rating and wrote, "If the main arch of Dexter: New Blood centers on him trying to 'be good', it's not going to work. First off, he's not good, never was, and never will be. Secondly, as I said in my recap of episode one, 2021 needs a lot of things, but one of them certainly isn't a prestige TV show about a white male killer turning his life around. Since the first frame of that first episode, we've been foaming at the mouth to see Dexter kill again. In the words of his son Harrison: 'So why all this Jim bullshit?' Just kill or get off the pot. We know it's coming anyway." Nick Harley of Den of Geek gave the episode a 3.5 star out of 5 rating and wrote, "So far, Dexter: New Blood is already far more competent than Dexter's final seasons from a storytelling perspective, but it still is setting the table. Until we can determine what the show is trying to achieve with this new version of Dexter, it's hard to gauge whether the revival is successful or even necessary. Still, 'Storm of Fuck' feels like its moving in the right direction." Mary Littlejohn of TV Fanatic gave the episode a 4.5 star out of 5 rating and wrote, "Dexter: New Blood is laying the groundwork for a thrilling and suspenseful ride. A slow burn is necessary at this stage of the game."
