= Are You...? =

- Dexter episode
- Episode no.: Season 7 Episode 1
- Directed by: John Dahl
- Written by: Scott Buck
- Original air date: September 30, 2012
- Running time: 55 min.

Guest appearances
- Ray Stevenson as Isaak Sirko; Aimee Garcia as Jamie Batista; Billy Brown as Det. Mike Anderson; Josh Cooke as Louis Greene; Jason Gedrick as George Novikov; Enver Gjokaj as Viktor Baskov; Nicholas Vigneau as Young Dexter; Savannah Paige Rae as Young Debra; Andrew Kirsanov as Jurg Yeliashkevych; Kathrin Middleton as Doris Morgan; Francisco Viana as Det. Jake Simms; Dana L. Wilson as Det. Angie Miller; Bentley Stingley as Stripper

Episode chronology
← Previous "This Is the Way the World Ends"	Next → "Sunshine and Frosty Swirl"
- Dexter (season 7)

"Are You...?" is the first episode of the seventh season of the Showtime television series Dexter and the seventy-third episode overall. The episode originally aired on September 30, 2012. It was directed by John Dahl and written by newly appointed showrunner Scott Buck.

The episode picks up immediately after the events of season six finale when Debra Morgan witnessed Dexter Morgan killing Travis Marshall. Dexter convinces Deb to help him cover up the murder, while trying to convince her the murder was a one-time event. The episode marks the introduction of the Russian Mafia, as well as the subplot involving Miami Metro Captain María LaGuerta. This episode also marks the final appearance of Billy Brown as Detective Mike Anderson.

The episode received near universal acclaim from critics. Many viewers had felt that the series had grown stale, repetitive and formulaic over the years, and especially criticized the sixth season as the series' low point. They welcomed the new and fresh direction the episode took, the fast pace, the relationship and interaction between Dexter and Debra and the acting of Hall and Carpenter. The Nielsen ratings were higher than any episode in the previous season.

== Plot ==
The episode begins with a flashforward to Dexter hurrying through an airport to catch a flight. He realizes his credit cards are cancelled.

Deb walks in on Dexter killing Travis Marshall, the infamous "Doomsday Killer." She pulls her gun and he tries to explain away the kill as self-defense and he "snapped". He explains the kill table and plastic wrap as it is his forensic instincts to get rid of the evidence. Deb wants to call it in, suggesting a temporary insanity plea or a good lawyer. Dexter dismisses this, saying his life, career and relationship to Harrison will be ruined, and instead suggests moving the body. She refuses, but then they agree to disguise it as a suicide. They set the church on fire with gasoline from a nearby gas station. However, Dexter drops his customary blood slide into a floor vent and does not notice it has gone.

Miami Metro Police, including forensics expert Vince Masuka (C. S. Lee), Detective Mike Anderson (Billy Brown), Sergeant Angel Batista (David Zayas), Detective Joey Quinn (Desmond Harrington) and Captain Maria LaGuerta, come to investigate the church. LaGuerta finds Dexter's broken blood slide.

Dexter returns to his apartment and finds Louis Greene (Josh Cooke) on his side of his apartment and gets angry at him. Louis later complains about Dexter to his girlfriend and Harrison's babysitter Jamie Batista (Aimee Garcia) and cancels his credit cards. Dexter goes to put Travis's blood slide away, but realizes that he lost it.

Flashbacks to Dexter and Deb's childhood demonstrate how Dexter's psychopathy has always affected Deb. Doris Morgan (Kathrin Lautner Middleton) surprises Deb with a dog, but Harry Morgan makes them take it back out of fear that Dexter will kill it. At one point, Dexter almost admits the reason to Deb but Harry stops him and tells him Deb wouldn't love the real him.

Mike calls Deb, suspicious about it being a suicide since Travis's car was not at the church. He later sees a driver, Viktor Baskov (Enver Gjokaj) on the side of the road with a flat tire. He stops to help him but discovers the corpse of Kaja Soroka, a stripper for a Ukrainian mob-run strip joint, the Foxhole, in his trunk. Viktor shoots him in panic, leaving the car and Soroka's corpse.

Deb begins questioning Dexter's story about how Travis was his first murder, and questions why he was so prepared with the plastic wrap, knives and apron. He tries to deflect her questions, but she remains suspicious and watchful of him. The police investigate Mike's crime scene where Dexter finds a fingerprint match on Baskov's car to Baskov. Deb, sitting in her car, has flashbacks of the Ice Truck Killer's attempted murder of her and notices the similarities between his kill table and Dexter's killing of Travis.

Angel and Quinn go to the Foxhole, but everyone denies knowing anything. They later reconcile their differences over a toast about Mike. The Foxhole's manager, George Novikov (Jason Gedrick), calls his superior Isaak Sirko in Kyiv, Ukraine to tell him that Viktor has fled and is on a flight to Ukraine. Dexter, however, intercepts him at the airport and kills him, dumping the body in the ocean as usual.

Deb visits Masuka who tells her that he agreed to work the late shift as long as Dexter worked in the morning; however, Deb then calls Jamie, who tells her that Dexter is at work and frequently works long hours into the night. Deb realizes that Dexter is lying and more memories come back which involve him and the Ice Truck Killer.

LaGuerta asks Masuka about the blood slide, and Masuka reminds her of James Doakes, who was framed as the Bay Harbor Butcher.

The episode ends with Dexter arriving at his apartment to find Deb, with his blood slides, weapons used for killing and the Ice Truck Killer prosthetic arm in front of her. She asks him if he's a serial killer, to which he responds "Yes."

== Production ==
Scott Buck says Deb discovering Dexter's secret is a "story we've talked about doing for a long time but it was never a story we wanted to do early on in the run of the show because it is such a big moment and the more you can build up to it, the more significant it is. It just felt like we teased the audience long enough. It was finally time to pull that punch and do that story. [...] It's a story we've been wanting to tell for a long time." Of writing the first scene in the church, Buck recalls "I just really loved writing that scene [...] because it had been in the back of our minds for so long, there were so many things that we knew we had to do in that scene. And it's almost like there's so many things you want to put in that scene and then you have to start pulling them out because it becomes too much and those little gems actually become parts of other episodes and stuff because eventually everything comes out." He also said about the pace "We have decided consciously this season to move things along a bit faster and not to play things out quite so slowly and not to tease the audience as much, to tease them but to answer that pretty quickly on."

Michael C. Hall says "It fundamentally changes [their dynamic] ... it's a relief and yet simultaneously a huge problem and a real bear for [them both] to wrestle with."

=== Casting ===
Rome actor Ray Stevenson was cast as the season's main villain, Isaak Sirko, for nine episodes. Sirko was a high-ranking member of a Ukrainian crime syndicate. He was the first new cast member for season 7 to be cast. Dexter showrunner Scott Buck had previously worked on Rome as a writer. Stevenson was convinced to accept the role after Buck revealed that the character was gay and heartbroken and acting out of love and revenge on Dexter. He considered it a big opportunity to play such a pivotal role. Stevenson also enjoyed the personal stake the character had in killing Dexter.

Jason Gedrick was cast as George Novikov, the owner of a crime-run Miami gentleman's club, in a multi-episode arc.

Calista Flockhart was announced as a guest star in an unknown role, but did not end up appearing in the episode.

Billy Brown makes his last appearance as Detective Mike Anderson. Scott Buck says Mike's death "was not taken lightly at all. It was done partially because Mike seemed to be the best cop in the precinct last season and because so much of our show is more about serial killers and about Dexter's secrets and stuff but we do take place in a police station which is an extremely dangerous place. And when police officers do die, it's always a horrible tragedy and often it's for the most silly minuscule reasons imaginable so we just try to play it as real as possible." Josh Cooke and Aimee Garcia continue to appear as Louis Greene and Jamie Batista, respectively. Enver Gjokaj was cast in a one-episode guest role as Viktor Baskov.

Nicholas Vigneau and Savannah Paige Rae were cast as Dexter and Debra as children for flashback scenes. Kathrin Middleton as Doris Morgan. Andrew Kirsanov makes his first in a set of recurring appearance as Isaak's loyal bodyguard, Jurg Yeliashkevych. Dana L. Wilson was cast as recurring Miami Metro Detective Angie Miller.

== Reception ==
=== Ratings ===
2.40 million viewers watched "Are You...?," the largest audience since the fifth season finale.

=== Critical reception ===
The episode received highly positive reviews from critics. Matt Fowler of IGN, like many other critics, was disappointed in season 6, and wrote "Are You...? does its best to speedboat past that forgettable year and deliver unto us a thrilling and viable endgame to the entire Dexter saga. He called the episode a "return to form" and that the episode "has assuaged most of [his] fears and given us some terrific new terrain to explore." He concludes his review by writing that "Are You...?" was a well-crafted and promising way to kick start this later season, and it left me with goosebumps and excitement for the rest of this year's story." Fowler also praised Jennifer Carpenter's "truly memorable performance that horrifically encapsulated the entire series to date."

The A.V. Club rated the episode an "A−", and agreed the sixth season "represented the death knell of the series, [...] but "Are You...?" represents a different Dexter." The reviewer especially praised the opening scene in the church, praising Buck's writing and Hall and Carpenter's performances. The review sums up with "Dexter appears to be, at long last, back on his game." The episode "lends a momentum that has been absent from the show since season two."

Drusilla Moorhouse of Zap2it praised the premiere as even better than expected.

Alan Sepinwall of HitFix lauded that although he was disillusioned with the sixth season because of the unchanging status quo and thus lack of stakes and danger, "Are You...?" gave him renewed hope for the series and "demonstrates just how much potential "Dexter" was wasting by avoiding consequences or paradigm shifts. [It] shakes the series out of the doldrums it's been in for several years now."

Matt Richenthal of TV Fanatic complained "Dexter had grown stale," and called season 6 "atrocious." However, Richenthal called the season 7 premiere "pure tension from beginning to end. [...] Just a terrific premiere all around, enough to help me forget all about [season 6]." He also praised Hall and Carpenter's acting.

James Hibberd of Entertainment Weekly opined the episode is "far superior to any episode from the contrived and lackluster sixth season."

Alex Moaba of The Huffington Post called the premiere "a game-changing episode that breathed new life into the series. [...] "Dexter" has embraced the freedom to ditch some its more tedious procedural elements and refocus on its new central tension. [...] Deb's struggle [...] showed just how suspenseful, complicated and emotionally-resonant "Dexter" can still be."

Anthony Ocasio of Screen Rant calls the beginning as a moment that viewers have waited to see since the series premiered and praised their conversations' anticipation. He also enjoyed Deb asking Dexter all the right questions. The episode "Almost allowing us to see Dexter's actions through Deb's eyes," and noted how Dexter's Dark Passenger has always affected Deb.

Kelly West of Cinema Blend wrote "given that the series had started to show its age in recent years, it's probably about time to explore this avenue. Not since Rita's death has something changed so drastically in Dexter's life, so it's going to be very exciting to see how this affects the series as much as how it will affect Deb and Dexter's relationship. From the first few episodes, the start of this transition feels true to the show and the characters."

On Metacritic, the episode had a rating of 81/100 based on 7 critics' reviews and a rating of 8.5 ("universal acclaim") based on 327 ratings.

Critics also praised the ending cliffhanger. Fowler praised the writers for not stalling for the ending, and for Deb discovering Dexter had killed many times before. Matt Fowler said "Given the past few years, it would not have been beyond this series to drag that particular journey out, but they squashed it in the first episode." Gregory Eckert of Paste wrote "I found the last scene of the premiere not only tense (and possibly one of the best scenes to date), but couldn't help feeling relieved that Dexter no longer needs to lie to Deb." Cory Barker of TV.com praised the ending, noting that the episode lulled him into a false sense that Deb would belief Travis to be Dexter's only kill. He was positive about Deb's character investigating Dexter, and said "It's taken over 70 episodes, many of them mediocre, to get to that moment, but man, it almost feels worth it."

Kelly West of Cinema Blend wrote "Deb stayed true to her character by being a good investigator and investigating Dexter. [...] I like that she knows for sure. We could've been looking at a full season of Deb asking questions and Dexter trying to convince her he's not a serial killer. For the sake of the show, I think it'll be better for Deb to have the truth outright than to spend a season wondering and obsessing."

Kevin Fitzpatrick of ScreenCrush was worried that it would take the whole season for Deb to find out Dexter was a serial killer, and thus praised the ending. However, he was weary of the Ukrainian mob plotline.

The subplots received more mixed reviews than Dexter and Deb's story. Matt Fowler opined that Mike's death subplot and the Ukrainian crime organization was not as intriguing. He was more positive and looking forward to LaGuerta's and Louis's storylines. The A.V. Club felt Dexter's tracking down and killing of Baskov repetitive and unoriginal. Fowler, Kelly West and AV Club both found the airport kill scene unrealistic. Aria Mohtadi of Seriable praised Deb and LaGuerta's plotlines, but thought that the supporting characters were boring. Katie Waldman of Slate thought the Ukrainians seemed clichéd. Cory Barker of TV.com wrote "I don't really care that LaGuerta is suddenly interested in the blood slide that Dexter accidentally left at the crime scene. And I certainly am unmoved by Batista and Quinn barking at each other to change when we know that they won't," and also found Dexter killing Viktor too "familiar and unimpressive." Kelly West called Mike's death a "shame" and a "waste," though not tragic as the character had not been known long.

Critics also praised the references to past episodes such as the Ice Truck Killer. Katie Waldman of Slate thought the references to past seasons, including the Ice Truck Killer, Rita, the Trinity Killer and Doakes, made the world of Dexter more layered and complete.
