= Hannah McKay (disambiguation) =

Hannah McKay may refer to:

- Hannah McKay, fictional character.
- Hannah McKay, Reuters photojournalist, winner of Pulitzer Prize, feature photography.
