= Do the Wrong Thing (Dexter) =

- Dexter episode
- Episode no.: Season 7 Episode 6
- Directed by: Alik Sakharov
- Written by: Lauren Gussis
- Cinematography by: Jeffrey Jur
- Editing by: Keith Henderson
- Original release date: November 4, 2012
- Running time: 54 minutes

Guest appearances
- Ray Stevenson as Isaak Sirko (special guest star); Yvonne Strahovski as Hannah McKay (special guest star); Aimee Garcia as Jamie Batista; Jason Gedrick as George Novikov; Santiago Cabrera as Sal Price; Katia Winter as Nadia; Geoffrey Rivas as Handyman

Episode chronology
← Previous "Swim Deep"	Next → "Chemistry"
- Dexter season 7

"Do the Wrong Thing" is the sixth episode of the seventh season of the American crime drama television series Dexter. It is the 78th overall episode of the series and was written by co-executive producer Lauren Gussis, and directed by Alik Sakharov. It originally aired on Showtime on November 4, 2012.

Set in Miami, the series centers on Dexter Morgan, a forensic technician specializing in bloodstain pattern analysis for the fictional Miami Metro Police Department, who leads a secret parallel life as a vigilante serial killer, hunting down murderers who have not been adequately punished by the justice system due to corruption or legal technicalities. In the episode, Dexter tries to find incriminating evidence against Hannah, while Isaak gets George to use everything to get him out of prison.

According to Nielsen Media Research, the episode was seen by an estimated 1.99 million household viewers and gained a 1.0 ratings share among adults aged 18–49. The episode received positive reviews from critics, although many were polarized over the episode's ending.

== Plot ==
Dexter (Michael C. Hall) stalks Hannah (Yvonne Strahovski), believing she might have killed her husband. However, Harry (James Remar) reminds Dexter that he lacks evidence against her, and Dexter also concludes that he must earn Hannah's trust after accusing her.

Dexter removes any sign of Hannah's DNA from the lab, and then apologizes to her by claiming he made a mistake. Dexter confides in her that his wife was murdered, while Hannah states her husband died from a heart attack. Dexter investigates Beverly Grey, the previous owner of Hannah's house, discovering that she recently died. Dexter also meets Sal Price (Santiago Cabrera), an author who wrote a true crime book detailing Wayne Randall's crimes. With the new involvement of Hannah, he is questioning Miami Metro for more details. He also states his suspicion that Hannah was involved in another crime, wherein she killed a counselor who abused her.

LaGuerta (Lauren Vélez) continues her investigation into the Bay Harbor Butcher, moving into his possible involvement in the Barrel Girls gang. Debra (Jennifer Carpenter) calls Dexter to understand a few missing details, discovering that Lumen helped Dexter in the killings. She worries she could be tracked and expose Dexter, but Dexter is certain Lumen will not talk. Sal, who has taken a liking to Debra, asks her out on a date. She initially refuses, but eventually agrees to go out with him, feeling that she needs something new in her life.

While dining with Jamie (Aimee Garcia), Angel (David Zayas) expresses interest in buying a restaurant, and contemplating retirement, feeling that this gives him a new purpose. Quinn (Desmond Harrington) is given $10,000 by George (Jason Gedrick) to stop interfering in the investigation, but Nadia (Katia Winter) convinces him to give it back. Pressured by Isaak to get him out, George forces Quinn to change the blood reports to exonerate Isaak and keep the money, threatening to send Nadia to a Dubai sex club if he does not comply. When Nadia does not answer his phone calls, Quinn reluctantly removes Isaak's blood sample from the evidence room.

To find what Sal knows, Dexter steals his files. He discovers that Sal made his own blood report on Beverly Grey's corpse, finding that a specific plant that Hannah cultivates led to her heart attack. He decides to invite Hannah on a date, which she initially declines, feeling disillusioned after her relationship with Randall. She talks about her dream of living in a farm in Argentina, and Dexter convinces her to give him a chance for just one date. During their date, Debra asks Sal about his new book, and he reveals that he made his own blood report on Randall's victims which found Hannah's DNA in one of the murders. Debra is horrified to learn that Dexter falsified his report. Dexter takes Hannah to a closed amusement park where he sedates her. He stages her on his kill table, explaining that this is what he does. Hannah does not resist, simply saying "Do what you gotta do", which surprises Dexter. Instead of killing her, he releases her and they have passionate sex.

== Production ==
The episode was written by co-executive producer Lauren Gussis, and directed by Alik Sakharov. This was Gussis' ninth writing credit, and Sakharov's first directing credit.

== Reception ==
=== Viewers ===
In its original American broadcast, "Do the Wrong Thing" was seen by an estimated 1.99 million household viewers with a 1.0 in the 18–49 demographics. This means that 1 percent of all households with televisions watched the episode. This was a 13% decrease in viewership from the previous episode, which was watched by an estimated 2.28 million household viewers with a 1.2 in the 18–49 demographics.

=== Critical reviews ===
"Do the Wrong Thing" received positive reviews from critics. Matt Fowler of IGN gave the episode a "great" 8.6 out of 10, and wrote, "One of the main things I liked about most of this episode was fact that, despite all the sexual tension between them in the past few episodes, Dexter still wanted to take her down. That was his first instinct. And right up until the final moments, I thought he still wanted to. Him taking her to that Santa's Village place reminded me of when Dexter killed Trinity. Delivering her to an emotional happy place/calm served almost as a "last wish" for someone who clings to fantasies as much as Hannah does. So I'm curious to see what happens next. Did Dexter just make the biggest blunder of the season?"

Joshua Alston of The A.V. Club gave the episode a "B" grade and wrote, "With the tear Dexter has been on since the season began, it was easy to forget that a lull had to come at some point. “Do The Wrong Thing” certainly feels like a lull, though it has more than enough solid moments to justify its existence, and it wasn't a chore to watch. More than that — and this is where I start to worry again — “Do The Wrong Thing” is the first episode of this season in which the writing is beginning to feel a tad contrived." Kevin Fitzpatrick of ScreenCrush wrote, "As the midpoint of the season, "Do the Wrong Thing" could suffer from a bit of a lull, with Isaak temporarily in jail and the relationship between Dexter and Deb on ice, but the episode gives us a nice transition into the back half of the season. If anything, we're definitely excited to see if Hannah can figure into the series on a bit more long-term basis. Quinn, on the other hand..."

Richard Rys of Vulture wrote, "Maybe the cure for Dexter's compulsions is kinky naked time with a hot blonde who has a few skeletons in her closet (and one in a hole). With all that's changed recently for the Morgans, one thing remains the same: their knack for finding love in the worst places." Katy Waldman of Slate wrote, "To me, “Do the Wrong Thing” was really all about Hannah McKay – her allure, her danger, the possibilities she opens up for Dexter."

Drusilla Moorhouse of Zap2it wrote, "Well, that was a first for Dexter. In another tableau shocker to rival Deb's discovery of her brother killing Travis Marshall, Dexter had his way with Hannah McKay." Esther Gim of BuddyTV wrote, "This week's episode left me definitely surprised and more than annoyed, almost disgusted. The first 55 minutes slowly - and a bit boringly - sets up Dexter figuring out Hannah is someone who fits his code and needs to be taken care of. But then in a moment of testosterone-filled impairment, that all goes out the window."

Nick Harley of Den of Geek wrote, "The major shift of Dexter's focus from Isaak to Hannah has been a strange detour that has definitely dulled the action in sunny Miami. Reminiscent of seasons past, the show seems to be using Hannah as mid-season filler to break up the action of the main storylines and seemingly fill time. Hopefully the Hannah McKay plot will grow and blend nicely into the main action and serve as a focal point in the season's endgame. Let's hope the diversion isn't just a pretty distraction." Matt Richenthal of TV Fanatic gave the episode a 4.9 star rating out of 5 and wrote, "Just a great, great episode all around. Quinn's storyline is even intriguing and, well, Batista may retire and purchase a restaurant. Okay, they can't all be winners."

Alex Moaba of HuffPost wrote, "Well, that on-the-table sex scene was a hell of a way to end an episode, wasn't it? For much of "Do The Wrong Thing," Dexter set his sights on killing Hannah McKay, but in the final moments, he came to his senses and just had sex with her instead. Was it hilariously absurd? Of course." Television Without Pity gave the episode a "B+" grade.
