= Do You See What I See? (Dexter) =

- Dexter episode
- Episode no.: Season 7 Episode 11
- Directed by: John Dahl
- Written by: Manny Coto; Wendy West
- Cinematography by: Jeffrey Jur
- Editing by: Amy E. Duddleston
- Original release date: December 9, 2012
- Running time: 57 minutes

Guest appearances
- Yvonne Strahovski as Hannah McKay (special guest star); Geoff Pierson as Thomas Matthews; Aimee Garcia as Jamie Batista; Nestor Serrano as Hector Estrada; Nicole LaLiberte as Arlene Schram

Episode chronology
← Previous "The Dark… Whatever"	Next → "Surprise, Motherfucker!"
- Dexter season 7

"Do You See What I See?" is the eleventh episode of the seventh season of the American crime drama television series Dexter. It is the 83rd overall episode of the series and was written by executive producers Manny Coto and Wendy West, and directed by John Dahl. It originally aired on Showtime on December 9, 2012.

Set in Miami, the series centers on Dexter Morgan, a forensic technician specializing in bloodstain pattern analysis for the fictional Miami Metro Police Department, who leads a secret parallel life as a vigilante serial killer, hunting down murderers who have not been adequately punished by the justice system due to corruption or legal technicalities. In the episode, Dexter discovers that the last survivor involved in his mother's death has been released, while LaGuerta closes in on Dexter.

According to Nielsen Media Research, the episode was seen by an estimated 2.60 million household viewers and gained a 1.3 ratings share among adults aged 18–49. This made it the most watched episode of the series, as well as the most watched episode for a Showtime original series. The episode received highly positive reviews from critics, who praised the twists, writing and character development.

== Plot ==
Dexter (Michael C. Hall) is contacted by a corrections officer, who tells him that Hector Estrada (Nestor Serrano), the last living person involved in his mother's murder, is having a hearing for a possible parole. He confides this in Hannah (Yvonne Strahovski), who accepts that Dexter must kill Estrada.

Matthews (Geoff Pierson) calls Dexter to meet him at his boat. He reveals that LaGuerta (Lauren Vélez) is investigating Dexter, believing him to be the Bay Harbor Butcher, also admitting that they found that the cabin was owned by Santos Jimenez. Matthews asks Dexter to his boat and begins to ask him subtle questions. He confides that LaGuerta thinks Dexter is the Butcher. Dexter soon realizes that Matthews is interrogating him and lies by claiming to have seen Doakes on a boat, and leaving his marina because he was afraid of him. Dexter and Debra (Jennifer Carpenter) then start working on pulling the suspicions away from Dexter. For this, Dexter gets an old boat set up at a warehouse, planting Doakes' fingerprints along with kill tools. LaGuerta believes Dexter planted it, but Matthews tells her he is done helping her, warning her to leave the case. She is later visited by Angel (David Zayas), who reveals he will formally retire on New Year's to focus on his restaurant.

Debra contacts Arlene Schram (Nicole LaLiberte), hoping she can testify against Hannah (Yvonne Strahovski). Debra is insistent on getting Hannah arrested, and threatens to cause Arlene to lose her children if she does not cooperate. Arlene visits Hannah to tell her, and she promises to take care. Hannah visits Debra to talk her out of it, but Debra makes it clear she will not stop until Hannah lands in jail. On her way to once again interrogate Arlene, Debra has a car accident and goes to the hospital. Angel believes she took anxiety pills, but Debra is certain she did not. Debra believes Hannah poisoned her, which Dexter finds unlikely. Quinn (Desmond Harrington) grows agitated when Nadia does not answer his phone calls. He visits the Fox Hole, and is disheartened to learn that Nadia has moved to Las Vegas for a new beginning. He then reads a letter that Nadia left him, and leaves disappointed.

Dexter takes Hannah to a Christmas Eve dinner with Jamie (Aimee Garcia) and Harrison. At her house, he makes it clear he suspects she was involved in Debra's poisoning, which she denies. She makes it clear she would not risk poisoning a Lieutenant, and states she never made a mistake. Dexter then leaves to meet with Estrada, having pretended to be a drug dealer. He sedates him and takes him to his table, revealing himself as Laura Moser's son. Estrada then accuses him of working with LaGuerta, making Dexter realize that she set him up by getting Estrada paroled. LaGuerta and other officers arrive shortly, forcing Dexter to escape with Estrada who takes the opportunity to flee. The following day, Dexter is told that a water bottle found in Debra's car contained alprazolam, confirming Hannah poisoned her. He then picks up Debra from the hospital, providing her with the pen that Hannah used to kill Sal Price. He visits Hannah, sharing a kiss, just before Debra and Angel arrive to arrest her for Sal's murder.

== Production ==
The episode was written by executive producers Manny Coto and Wendy West, and directed by John Dahl. This was Coto's eighth writing credit, West's ninth writing credit, and Dahl's 14th directing credit.

== Reception ==
=== Viewers ===
In its original American broadcast, "Do You See What I See?" was seen by an estimated 2.60 million household viewers with a 1.3 in the 18–49 demographics. This means that 1.3 percent of all households with televisions watched the episode. This was a 25% increase in viewership from the previous episode, which was watched by an estimated 2.08 million household viewers with a 1.1 in the 18–49 demographics.

=== Critical reviews ===
"Do You See What I See?" received highly positive reviews from critics. Matt Fowler of IGN gave the episode an "amazing" 9 out of 10, and wrote, ""Do You See What I See?" definitely had a big cliffhanger-y scene that they could have ended things on, sending us into the finale with a sense of dread, but I applaud the choice to end it on a sad and sentimental note; the death of Dexter's dream house. We feel bad for Hannah even though she, unlike Dexter, pretty much spent her life killing innocent people. But doubt got the better of Dexter. "If anything ever happens to Deb I'll think you had something to do with it." There are a few things that still bother me about this endgame that I hope get cleared up and smoothed out next week, but for now things are appropriately tense and tragic."

Joshua Alston of The A.V. Club gave the episode a "C–" grade and wrote, "By the time “Do You See What I See?” was over, I felt about the same way as I did going into it. I certainly enjoyed watching it more than “The Dark... Whatever,” and a bit of it I quite liked. But I'm still not hopeful the season finale will be enough to change my impression of season seven as one that bolted out of the gate, but started to peter out by a little past the halfway point." Kevin Fitzpatrick of ScreenCrush wrote, "We'd been worried that Dexter dispatched its main threats too early, leaving only Hannah and LaGuerta's investigation to carry the rest of the season, but now his Christmas goose seems thoroughly cooked. Not only does LaGuerta have apparent confirmation that the Butcher is still alive, but now Hannah has the power to put Dexter behind bars as well."

Richard Rys of Vulture gave the episode a 4 star rating out of 5 and wrote, "despite some of the ho-hum storylines, the killers that came and went, and an episode or two that slumped, season seven is rallying as the finish line approaches. In the wake of last night, the elements are in place for a whopper of a cliffhanger finale." Katy Waldman of Slate wrote, "The show took pains to show us that Estrada was totally unreformed. At the time, the fact just struck me as more justification for Dexter's vigilantism, but now it seems thematically resonant. Once a killer, always a killer. That's the painful truth Dexter deduced from the latest Hannah twist."

Drusilla Moorhouse of Zap2it wrote, "It's definitely anything but merry for our favorite serial killer, whose trouble with women reaches an all-time high in Season 7's penultimate episode, "Do You See What I See."" Esther Gim of BuddyTV wrote, "Tonight's episode feels a bit like a season finale in that so many plotlines are wrapped up, with the exception of Estrada escaping."

Billy Grifter of Den of Geek wrote, "I'm so glad that this show still has the ability to surprise, because it has on occasion telegraphed rather blatantly its meticulously planned twists. In the first ten or more minutes I sat wondering why we were covering the well-trodden ground of Debra not liking Hannah, and LaGuerta not letting the idea that Doakes was framed go." Miranda Wicker of TV Fanatic gave the episode a 4 star rating out of 5 and wrote, "Maybe it was all the Christmas decorations scattered throughout "Do You See What I See?," but I feel like Dexter just gave us the gift of one of the best episodes of this season." Television Without Pity gave the episode an "A–" grade.
