= Massive Retaliation (film) =

- Directed by: Thomas A. Cohen
- Written by: Richard Beban; Larry Wittnebert
- Starring: Tom Bower; Karlene Crockett; Peter Donat; Bobcat Goldthwait; Jason Gedrick
- Release date: September 25, 1984
- Running time: 90 minutes
- Country: United States
- Language: English

Massive Retaliation is a 1984 American film directed by Thomas A. Cohen. It includes the film debut of Bobcat Goldthwait as quirky redneck antagonist Ernie Rust.

The movie has been compared to The Shelter by Rod Serling, which it somewhat resembles in terms of story-line and subject matter.

== Plot ==
When word comes of nuclear war between the USA and Russia in the Middle East comes out, three families leave their homes in the city and head to a survivalist outpost.
