= Matt Gerald =

American actor

- Born: Matthew Gerald; May 2, 1970 (age 56); Miami, Florida, U.S.
- Occupation: Actor
- Years active: 1998–present

Matt Gerald (born May 2, 1970) is an American actor.

== Biography ==
Gerald was born in Miami, Florida. A graduate of The University of Pennsylvania, he is best known for his Marvel Cinematic Universe (MCU) roles as White Power Dave in All Hail the King (2014) and Melvin Potter in Netflix's Daredevil (2015–2018) and as Corporal Lyle Wainfleet in James Cameron's science-fiction Avatar film franchise.

== Filmography ==
Key
†	Denotes films that have not yet been released

=== Film ===
Year	Title	Role	Notes
1998	Starstruck	Patrolman	
1998	Judas Kiss	Agent #1	
1999	The Minus Man	Arresting Officer	
1999	Magnolia	Officer #2	
2000	Tigerland	Sgt. Eveland	
2003	Terminator 3: Rise of the Machines	SWAT Team Leader	
2003	S.W.A.T.	Nick	
2005	XXX: State of the Union	Liebo	
2005	In the Mix	Jackie	
2008	Choke	Detective Ryan	
2009	Avatar	Corporal Lyle Wainfleet	
2010	Elektra Luxx	Michael Ortiz	
2010	Faster	Driver's Brother	
2012	Freelancers	Billy Morrison	
2012	Red Dawn	Hodges	
2013	G.I. Joe: Retaliation	Zandar / Havoc	
2013	The Frozen Ground	Ed Stauber	
2013	Escape Plan	Roag	
2014	All Hail the King	White Power Dave	Short film
2015	Ant-Man	White Power Dave	Deleted scene
2015	San Andreas	Harrison	
2015	Solace	Agent Sloman	
2016	Restored Me	Detective Derek Shane	
2016	Broken Vows	Clay Darrow	
2016	Patriots Day	FBI Hostage Rescue Team	
2017	Bright	Hicks	
2017	Shot Caller	Phil Cole	
2018	Rampage	Zammit	
2022	Avatar: The Way of Water	Corporal Lyle Wainfleet	
2025	Avatar: Fire and Ash	Corporal Lyle Wainfleet	
2026	Animals	the kidnapper / James Bureaux	

=== Television ===
Year	Title	Role	Notes
2004	The Shield	Tommy Hisk	7 episodes
2005	E-Ring	Robbie Benvenuto	1 episode
2006–2008	The Unit	Beau Dauber / Dauber	3 episodes
2007	CSI: Crime Scene Investigation	Vincent Lafoon	1 episode
2007	Life	Krebbs	2 episodes
2008	Without a Trace	Roger Graham	1 episode
2009	Saving Grace	X	1 episode
2009	Lie to Me	Marshal Johnson	1 episode
2010	NCIS: Los Angeles	Victor Janklow	1 episode
2010	CSI: Miami	Dan Wilson	1 episode
2011	Criminal Minds: Suspect Behavior	Det. Craig	1 episode
2012	Last Resort	Gil Langston	1 episode
2012	Grimm	Arbok	1 episode
2012	Dexter	Ray Speltzer	2 episodes
2013	Hawaii Five-0	Warrick	1 episode
2013	Castle	Jimmy Wolfinsky	1 episode
2014	Intelligence	Lt. John Norris	1 episode
2015–2018	Daredevil	Melvin Potter	7 episodes
2020	Lucifer	Hank	1 episode
2021–present	Lioness	Cody J, Goose	4 episodes
2024	Yellowstone	Grant Horton	2 episodes
