= Jason Gedrick =

American actor (born 1965)

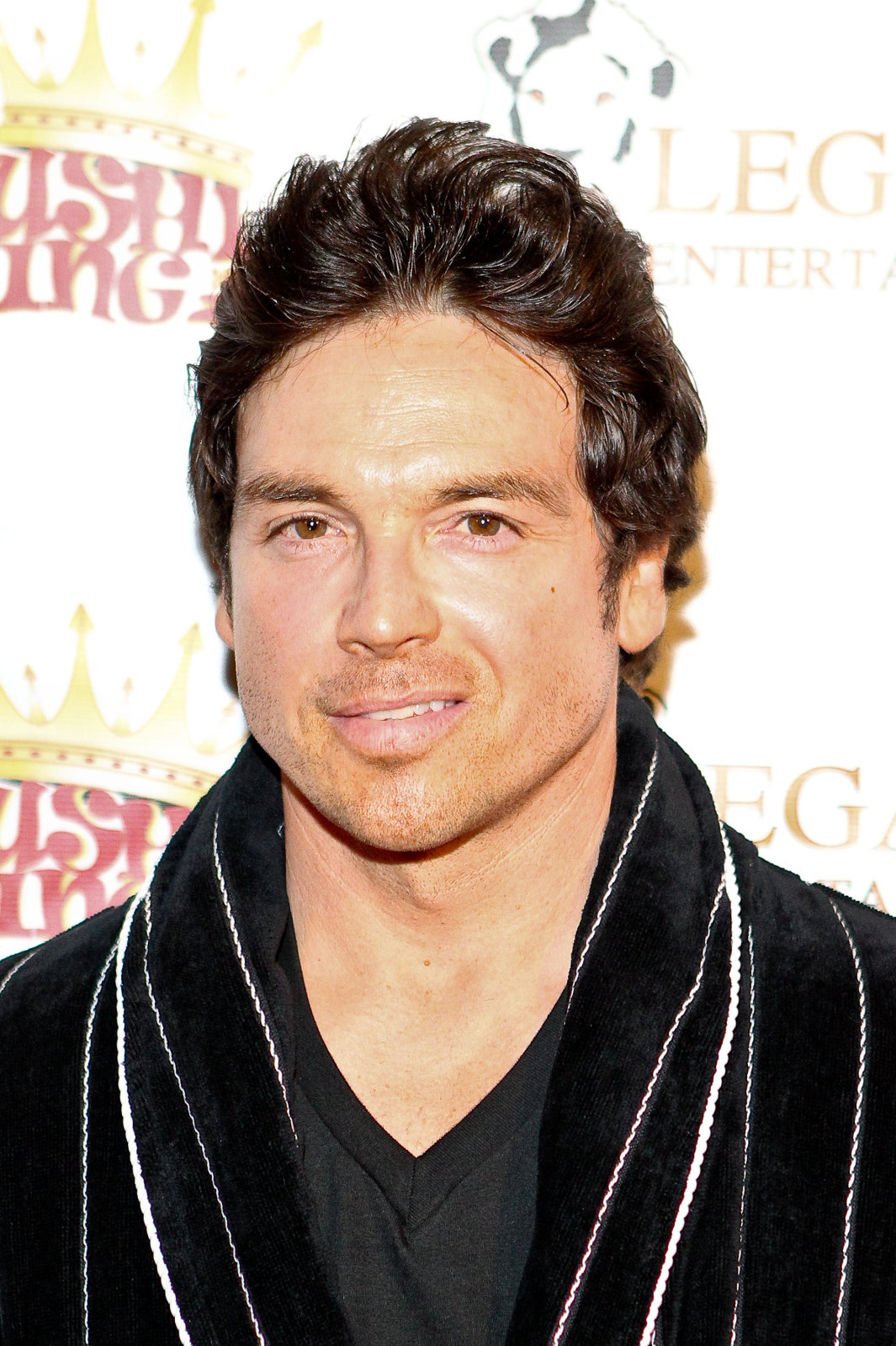
- Gedrick in February 2010
- Born: Jason Michael Gedroic; February 7, 1965 (age 61); Chicago, Illinois, U.S.
- Occupation: Actor
- Years active: 1983–2019

Jason Michael Gedrick (born February 7, 1965) is an American actor. He is best known for his work on the television series Murder One and Boomtown, and the motion picture Iron Eagle as Doug Masters.

He starred in the 2001 film Summer Catch as Mike Dunne, the older brother of the main character Ryan.

== Early life ==
Jason Michael Gedrick was born Jason Gedroic in Illinois, and is of Polish descent.

== Acting career ==
After changing his surname to the homonymous "Gedrick", he began his career as an extra in films such as Bad Boys (1983) and Risky Business (1983).

He had roles in The Heavenly Kid (1985), Iron Eagle (1986), and Promised Land (1987) with director Michael Hoffman, Iron Eagle II (1988 in an uncredited role for the first few minutes of the movie), Born on the Fourth of July (1989), the cult classic Rooftops (1989), Backdraft (1991), and Crossing the Bridge (1992). Gedrick then appeared in television series such as Class of '96 (1993) and Sweet Justice (1994).

In 1994, Gedrick starred in the film The Force with Yasmine Bleeth and Kim Delaney. He starred in the first season of Steven Bochco's 1995 television series Murder One, which followed the trial of Gedrick's character, bad-boy actor Neil Avedon. His next major project was the three-hour TV film The Third Twin (1997), a thriller based on the best-selling 1996 novel by the British writer Ken Follett.

Gedrick had a role in TV series EZ Streets (1996) and appeared in Mario Puzo's 1997 miniseries, The Last Don and in its sequel, The Last Don II. In 1999, he guest starred on Ally McBeal as the "hot car wash guy".

Gedrick had roles in Falcone (2000) and The Beast (2001). He also starred as Tom Turcotte in 2002's Boomtown. The series, which also starred Donnie Wahlberg and Neal McDonough.

In 2003, Gedrick played Andrew Luster, the infamous rapist in a Lifetime movie based on his trial, A Date with Darkness. He starred in the 2006 movie Hidden Places alongside Sydney Penney and Shirley Jones.

Gedrick was part of the cast of the 2006 NBC series Windfall, also starring Luke Perry and Gedrick's former Boomtown alumnus, Lana Parrilla. In 2007, Gedrick again starred alongside Donnie Wahlberg in the A&E original movie Kings of South Beach. He was also the new love interest at Scavo's Pizzeria in Desperate Housewives in seasons 3 and 4, on ABC. In 2009, he appeared in Lie to Me.

In 2011, he appeared in another series, Necessary Roughness as Dr. J. D. Aldridge, a former graduate school professor and possible love interest for series lead Callie Thorne.

Gedrick was a member of the cast of the HBO series Luck, which ran for one season in 2012. Gedrick appears in a multi-episode arc playing the manager of a Miami-area gentlemen's club that becomes linked to a high-profile murder case in season 7 of Dexter. Beginning in November 2012, Gedrick starred as Evan Farnsworth, a struggling professor at a prestigious Maine boarding school, in the Hallmark film The Wishing Tree.

In late 2012, Gedrick appeared on an episode of NBC's Grimm. In 2015, he had a season-long arc as serial killer Raynard Waits in the Amazon Prime original television series Bosch, along with a recurring role as Liam in The CW's 2012 series Beauty & the Beast. In 2016, Gedrick starred as estranged Det. Mark Hickman, Lt. Mike Tao's ex-partner, on Major Crimes.

== Filmography ==
=== Film ===
Year	Title	Role	Notes
1983	Bad Boys	Inmate	
1983	Risky Business	Extra at Party	
1984	Massive Retaliation	Eric Briscoe	
1985	The Zoo Gang	Hardin	
1985	The Heavenly Kid	Lenny Barnes	
1986	Iron Eagle	Doug Masters	
1987	Stacking	Gary Connaloe	
1987	Promised Land	Davey Hancock	
1988	Iron Eagle II	Doug Masters	
1989	Rooftops	T	
1989	Born on the Fourth of July	Pvt. Martinez	
1990	Still Life: The Fine Art of Murder	Peter Sherwood	
1991	Backdraft	Tim Krizminski	
1992	Crossing the Bridge	Tim Reese	
1994	The Force	Cal Warner	Video
1995	Dare to Love	Patrick	TV movie
1996	Power 98	John Price	
1997	The Third Twin	Steve Logan/Other Twins	TV movie
1997	Silent Cradle	Jay Mitchell	
1998	Gentlemen Like Chris	Jacques Derrida	Short
2001	Summer Catch	Mike Dunne	
2001	One Eyed King	Dennis Reilly	
2002	Strange Frequency 2	Vince Brava	TV movie
2003	A Date with Darkness: The Trial and Capture of Andrew Luster	Andrew Luster	TV movie
2006	Hidden Places	Gabe Harper	TV movie
2006	Rapid Fire	Tony	TV movie
2008	Wisegal	Frank Russo	TV movie
2008	Depth Charge	Raymond "Doc" Ellers	TV movie
2008	The Christmas Choir	Peter Brockman	TV movie
2009	Shannon's Rainbow	Eric	
2009	Sand Serpents	Richard Stanley	TV movie
2010	Sinatra Club	Sal	
2012	War Flowers	Louis McIntire	
2012	The Shooting Star Salesman	Businessman	Short
2012	The Wishing Tree	Professor Evan Farnsworth	TV movie
2013	Skating to New York	Doug Demas	
2018	Bella's Story	Danny	
2018	Acts of Desperation	Alan Grillo	

=== Television ===
Year	Title	Role	Notes
1989	The Hitchhiker	Tommy	Episode: "Phantom Zone"
1992	In Living Color	-	Episode: "Episode #3.27"
1993	Class of '96	David Morrisey	Main Cast
1994	Birdland	Nick	Episode: "Lower Than the Angels"
1994	Heaven Help Us	Singer	Episode: "Lovers Lullaby"
1994–95	Sweet Justice	Bailey Connors	Main Cast
1995–96	Murder One	Neil Avedon	Main Cast: Season 1
1996–97	EZ Streets	Danny Rooney	Main Cast
1997	The Last Don	Cross De Lena	Episode: "Part 1 & 2"
1998	The Last Don II	Cross De Lena	Episode: "Part 1 & 2"
1999	Ally McBeal	Joel	Recurring Cast: Season 3
2000	Falcone	Joseph D. Pistone/"Joe Falcone"	Main Cast
2001	The Beast	Reese McFadden	Main Cast
2001	Strange Frequency	-	Episode: "Instant Karma"
2002	The Outer Limits	Captain Kelvin Parkhurst	Episode: "Human Trials"
2002	Philly	Chris Maguire	Episode: "Brotherly Love"
2002–03	Boomtown	Officer Tom Turcotte	Main Cast
2004	North Shore	Dr. Clayton Kellogg	Recurring Cast
2004–05	LAX	Gavin	Recurring Cast
2005	S.O.S. 18	Tom Turcotte	Episode: "Fille mère"
2005	Crossing Jordan	Eli Graham	Episode: "Enlightenment"
2006	Windfall	Cameron Walsh	Main Cast
2006	Supernatural	Det. Peter Sheridan	Episode: "The Usual Suspects"
2006	Ghost Whisperer	Jesse Sutton	Episode: "The Night We Met"
2007	Lincoln Heights	Joey Mulaney	Episode: "Spree"
2006–07	Desperate Housewives	Rick Coletti	Recurring Cast: Season 3–4
2009	Cold Case	U.S. Marshal Tom Parker	Episode: "Witness Protection"
2009	Lie to Me	John Parks	Episode: "Secret Santa"
2011	Necessary Roughness	J.D. Aldridge	Recurring Cast: Season 1
2011–12	Luck	Jerry	Main Cast
2012	Georgia	Ganesh	Episode: "Hello, I'm Sunshine"
2012	Grimm	Craig Wendell Ferren	Episode: "To Protect And Serve Man"
2012	Dexter	George Novikov	Recurring Cast: Season 7
2012	Law & Order: Special Victims Unit	FBI Agent Cantwell	Episode: "Dreams Deferred"
2014	How to Get Away with Murder	Gabriel Shaw	Episode: "Smile, or Go to Jail"
2015	Bosch	Raynard Waits	Main Cast: Season 1
2015	Justified	Richard	Episode: "The Promise"
2015	Beauty & the Beast	Liam	Recurring Cast: Season 3
2016	Shooter	Officer Timmons	Recurring Cast: Season 1
2016–17	Major Crimes	Det. Mark Hickman	Recurring Cast: Season 4, Guest: Season 5
2018	Criminal Minds	Craig Kaline	Episode: “The Dance of Love”
2019	Lethal Weapon	Frank Hardy	Episode: “The Roger and Me”
