= Hannah McKay =

Fictional character

- Dexter character
- Yvonne Strahovski as Hannah McKay
- First appearance: "Buck the System" (2012)
- Last appearance: "Remember the Monsters?" (2013)
- Portrayed by: Yvonne Strahovski

In-universe information
- Gender: Female
- Occupation: Gardener
- Family: Clint McKay (father; deceased)
- Spouses: Jake Kirkwood (husband; deceased); Miles Castner (husband; deceased)
- Significant others: Wayne Randall (ex-boyfriend; deceased); Dexter Morgan (boyfriend)
- Children: Harrison Morgan (adoptive son)
- Nationality: American

Hannah McKay is a fictional character portrayed by Yvonne Strahovski, in the seventh and eighth seasons of the Showtime television series Dexter.

Hannah is first introduced in season 7, episode 3, "Buck the System", as the former accomplice of spree killer, Wayne Randall. Hannah becomes romantically involved with Dexter Morgan.

At some point during the timeline in between Dexter and the revival series Dexter: New Blood, Hannah dies of pancreatic cancer.

== Character history ==
Hannah McKay was born in Clopton, Alabama, on July 30, 1982. (Note: As depicted in Debra's computer in season 8, episode 7; incidentally, also Yvonne Strahovski's real birth date) When she was 15, her boyfriend Wayne Randall took her on a trip that became a three-state killing spree. She spent six years in juvenile detention after pleading guilty to being Randall's accomplice. She claimed not to have actually committed any of the murders and received immunity from prosecution after agreeing to testify against Randall. McKay then poisoned a counselor who had been molesting her and her friend Arlene Schram.

Hannah married an older man, Jake Kirkwood, but poisoned him with Aconite because he was trying to pressure her into having an abortion. She later miscarried. She inherited her gardening business from her mentor, who she was later suspected of poisoning with aconitum.

=== Season 7 ===
When Randall decided to reveal where he buried the last of his victims, Miami Metro Homicide sends Dexter and Angel Batista to obtain a DNA sample from Hannah; Dexter is immediately taken with her and becomes uncharacteristically distracted in his work. After Randall commits suicide, Hannah assists in locating the remaining bodies. After uncovering the bodies of a couple Randall killed, Dexter realizes Hannah's story isn't truthful. While on a date, Dexter takes Hannah to a closed Christmas-themed amusement park, where it turns out Dexter has a kill room set up. He prepares to kill Hannah, but cannot go through with it and releases her and they end up having sex in the kill room instead. They become a couple and they both fall in love for the first time; he helps her by disposing of her abusive father and she helps him realize that his "Dark Passenger" does not control his life.

When Sal Price, a true crime writer who has written a book about Wayne Randall, wants to write a sequel about Hannah, she agrees to an interview. She admits to stabbing the woman at the hotel and then poisons Price, who later collapses and dies in Dexter's apartment. Furious over Price's death and knowing that Hannah had confessed to him, Dexter's adoptive sister Debra calls Hannah in for questioning. Debra has very little proof against Hannah and instead baits her with information about a miscarriage. Dexter later confronts Hannah at her home, telling her that Price's death was needless. Hannah is touched to learn that Dexter deleted Price's files. She and Dexter later sleep together.

Debra is convinced that Hannah has gotten away with killing Price and asks Dexter to kill her, but Dexter refuses. Debra warns Hannah that she will pay for what she has done. Hannah then spikes Debra's drinking water with Xanax, causing her to pass out while driving. When Dexter learns what Hannah has done, he reluctantly gives Debra evidence that Hannah killed Price and Debra arrests her.

Dexter visits Hannah in prison. She admits she poisoned Debra because she tried to separate them, and Dexter tells her he had to turn her in to protect his sister. Hannah assures Dexter that she won't share his secret when she goes to trial. During Hannah's arraignment, her friend Arlene slips her a substance that causes her to have a seizure. Hannah is taken to the hospital and escapes. Before disappearing, she leaves a black orchid on Dexter's doorstep.

=== Season 8 ===
While they are having lunch together, Dexter and Debra both feel as if they have been drugged, just before he passes out, Dexter sees Hannah standing over him. When he later regains consciousness, Dexter begins investigating Hannah and finds that she has changed her name to Maggie and married Miles Castner (Julian Sands), a wealthy businessman. Dexter goes to see Hannah, who says that she had wanted him to kill Castner but changed her mind after realizing she is still in love with Dexter. Castner warns Dexter to stay away from Hannah and has him beaten up. Dexter goes to Castner's boat to protect Hannah but finds that she has already killed Castner; they dispose of the body and promise to watch out for each other. They resume dating and make plans to flee to Argentina with Dexter's son Harrison.

Hannah finds out Jacob Elway, a private investigator and Debra's former boss, and federal marshal Max Clayton are looking to arrest her and Dexter's latest intended victim, Oliver Saxon, threatens to come after his family. Dexter and Hannah book a flight, but it is delayed by a hurricane, so Dexter sends her and Harrison ahead on a bus to Jacksonville to keep them safe, planning to join them later to fly to Buenos Aires. Elway follows Hannah onto the bus and tries to arrest her, but she gets the better of him by stabbing him with a hypodermic needle filled with a sedative, knocking him out so she and Harrison can escape. As she and Harrison board the plane to Argentina, Dexter calls and tells them both that he loves them; she is unaware that he is really saying goodbye, as he plans to fake his own death in order to keep them safe from him. In Argentina, Hannah reads Dexter's boat crashed during the hurricane and that he is presumed dead. She absorbs the news quietly, takes Harrison's hand and walks with him to get ice cream.

=== Dexter: New Blood ===
Hannah does not make an appearance in Dexter: New Blood, set 10 years after the original series. However, the now-teenage Harrison tells Dexter that Hannah died of pancreatic cancer. After her death, a social worker had put Harrison on a plane from Buenos Aires to Miami. He decided to find his father and went to a letter's return address in Oregon, a letter that Dexter sent to Hannah revealing that he is still alive and asking her to keep him away from his son unless he displays "dark tendencies". This begins Harrison's ultimately successful effort to track down Dexter.

== Reception ==
Strahovski won the Saturn Award for Best Guest Starring Role on Television in 2013.
