= List of Dexter episodes =

Dexter is an American television drama that was originally broadcast on the premium cable channel Showtime from October 1, 2006, to September 22, 2013. It has an initial total of 8 seasons which contains 96 episodes. The first continuation, a limited series subtitled New Blood, aired from November 7, 2021, to January 9, 2022. The second continuation subtitled Resurrection, premiered on July 11, 2025, and is planned to contain multiple seasons.

The series is based on characters created by Jeff Lindsay for his Dexter series of novels, and follows the life of Dexter Morgan (Michael C. Hall), a Miami Metro Police Department blood pattern analyst with a double life. While investigating murders in the homicide division, Dexter hunts and kills murderers and criminals who have escaped the justice system. Although the first season is based on the events of Darkly Dreaming Dexter, the series's subsequent seasons do not follow the novels in the series. Departing from the narrative of Lindsay's second Dexter novel Dearly Devoted Dexter, the show's writer Daniel Cerone said that the writers "didn't see the opportunity in the second book" to adapt it.

The series has received generally favorable reviews from critics, while the second season was widely praised. The pilot episode, which aired in the United States on October 1, 2006, attracted more than a million viewers, giving Showtime its highest series ratings in nearly two years. Due to a dearth of original programming as a result of the 2007–08 Writers Guild of America strike, CBS began broadcasting Dexter in edited form on free-to-air television on February 17, 2008, thus making Dexter the first program in two decades to air on a national broadcast network after being shown on a premium cable channel. Eight seasons comprising twelve episodes each have been broadcast in the United States and abroad. All eight seasons have been released on DVD and on Blu-ray; box sets containing the first three seasons were released on August 18, 2009, on both DVD and Blu-ray.

The show received multiple nominations for various awards, winning 52—including four Primetime Emmy Awards, two Golden Globe Awards, seven Satellite Awards, six Saturn Awards, one Screen Actors Guild Award, and one TCA Award—and was twice selected by the American Film Institute as one of the ten best television programs of the year in 2006 and 2007. Other nominations include PGA Awards, WGA Awards, and Peabody Awards.

== Series overview ==
Season	Episodes	Originally released	
Season	Episodes	First released	Last released
1	12	October 1, 2006	December 17, 2006
2	12	September 30, 2007	December 16, 2007
3	12	September 28, 2008	December 14, 2008
4	12	September 27, 2009	December 13, 2009
5	12	September 26, 2010	December 12, 2010
6	12	October 2, 2011	December 18, 2011
7	12	September 30, 2012	December 16, 2012
8	12	June 30, 2013	September 22, 2013

== Episodes ==
=== Season 1 (2006) ===
No. overall	No. in season	Title	Directed by	Written by	Original release date	U.S. viewers (millions)
1	1	"Dexter"	Michael Cuesta	James Manos Jr.	October 1, 2006	0.60
2	2	"Crocodile"	Michael Cuesta	Clyde Phillips	October 8, 2006	0.41
3	3	"Popping Cherry"	Michael Cuesta	Daniel Cerone	October 15, 2006	0.38
4	4	"Let's Give the Boy a Hand"	Robert Lieberman	Drew Z. Greenberg	October 22, 2006	0.49
5	5	"Love American Style"	Robert Lieberman	Melissa Rosenberg	October 29, 2006	0.46
6	6	"Return to Sender"	Tony Goldwyn	Tim Schlattmann	November 5, 2006	0.59
7	7	"Circle of Friends"	Steve Shill	Daniel Cerone	November 12, 2006	0.61
8	8	"Shrink Wrap"	Tony Goldwyn	Lauren Gussis	November 19, 2006	0.57
9	9	"Father Knows Best"	Adam Davidson	Melissa Rosenberg	November 26, 2006	0.76
10	10	"Seeing Red"	Michael Cuesta	Kevin R. Maynard	December 3, 2006	0.79
11	11	"Truth Be Told"	Keith Gordon	Drew Z. Greenberg & Tim Schlattmann	December 10, 2006	0.76
12	12	"Born Free"	Michael Cuesta	Daniel Cerone & Melissa Rosenberg	December 17, 2006	1.08

=== Season 2 (2007) ===
No. overall	No. in season	Title	Directed by	Written by	Original release date	U.S. viewers (millions)
13	1	"It's Alive!"	Tony Goldwyn	Daniel Cerone	September 30, 2007	1.01
14	2	"Waiting to Exhale"	Marcos Siega	Clyde Phillips	October 7, 2007	0.89
15	3	"An Inconvenient Lie"	Tony Goldwyn	Melissa Rosenberg	October 14, 2007	0.95
16	4	"See-Through"	Nick Gomez	Scott Buck	October 21, 2007	0.80
17	5	"The Dark Defender"	Keith Gordon	Tim Schlattmann	October 28, 2007	0.63
18	6	"Dex, Lies, and Videotape"	Nick Gomez	Lauren Gussis	November 4, 2007	0.85
19	7	"That Night, A Forest Grew"	Jeremy Podeswa	Daniel Cerone	November 11, 2007	0.84
20	8	"Morning Comes"	Keith Gordon	Scott Buck	November 18, 2007	1.23
21	9	"Resistance Is Futile"	Marcos Siega	Melissa Rosenberg	November 25, 2007	1.03
22	10	"There's Something About Harry"	Steve Shill	Scott Reynolds	December 2, 2007	1.08
23	11	"Left Turn Ahead"	Marcos Siega	Scott Buck & Tim Schlattmann	December 9, 2007	0.89
24	12	"The British Invasion"	Steve Shill	Story by : Daniel Cerone & Melissa Rosenberg; Teleplay by : Daniel Cerone	December 16, 2007	1.02

=== Season 3 (2008) ===
No. overall	No. in season	Title	Directed by	Written by	Original release date	U.S. viewers (millions)
25	1	"Our Father"	Keith Gordon	Clyde Phillips	September 28, 2008	1.22
26	2	"Finding Freebo"	Marcos Siega	Melissa Rosenberg	October 5, 2008	0.79
27	3	"The Lion Sleeps Tonight"	John Dahl	Scott Buck	October 12, 2008	1.07
28	4	"All in the Family"	Keith Gordon	Adam E. Fierro	October 19, 2008	0.86
29	5	"Turning Biminese"	Marcos Siega	Tim Schlattmann	October 26, 2008	1.00
30	6	"Sí Se Puede"	Ernest Dickerson	Charles H. Eglee	November 2, 2008	1.04
31	7	"Easy as Pie"	Steve Shill	Lauren Gussis	November 9, 2008	0.83
32	8	"The Damage a Man Can Do"	Marcos Siega	Scott Buck	November 16, 2008	0.96
33	9	"About Last Night"	Tim Hunter	Story by : Scott Reynolds; Teleplay by : Melissa Rosenberg	November 23, 2008	1.13
34	10	"Go Your Own Way"	John Dahl	Tim Schlattmann	November 30, 2008	1.34
35	11	"I Had a Dream"	Marcos Siega	Charles H. Eglee and Lauren Gussis	December 7, 2008	1.34
36	12	"Do You Take Dexter Morgan?"	Keith Gordon	Scott Buck	December 14, 2008	1.51

=== Season 4 (2009) ===
No. overall	No. in season	Title	Directed by	Written by	Original release date	U.S. viewers (millions)
37	1	"Living the Dream"	Marcos Siega	Clyde Phillips	September 27, 2009	1.52
38	2	"Remains to Be Seen"	Brian Kirk	Charles H. Eglee	October 4, 2009	1.37
39	3	"Blinded by the Light"	Marcos Siega	Scott Buck	October 11, 2009	1.24
40	4	"Dex Takes a Holiday"	John Dahl	Melissa Rosenberg & Wendy West	October 18, 2009	1.51
41	5	"Dirty Harry"	Keith Gordon	Tim Schlattmann	October 25, 2009	1.68
42	6	"If I Had a Hammer"	Romeo Tirone	Lauren Gussis	November 1, 2009	1.88
43	7	"Slack Tide"	Tim Hunter	Scott Buck	November 8, 2009	1.76
44	8	"Road Kill"	Ernest Dickerson	Melissa Rosenberg & Scott Reynolds	November 15, 2009	1.69
45	9	"Hungry Man"	John Dahl	Wendy West	November 22, 2009	1.76
46	10	"Lost Boys"	Keith Gordon	Charles H. Eglee & Tim Schlattmann	November 29, 2009	1.80
47	11	"Hello, Dexter Morgan"	SJ Clarkson	Scott Buck & Lauren Gussis	December 6, 2009	2.11
48	12	"The Getaway"	Steve Shill	Story by : Scott Reynolds & Melissa Rosenberg; Teleplay by : Wendy West & Melissa Rosenberg	December 13, 2009	2.58

=== Season 5 (2010) ===
No. overall	No. in season	Title	Directed by	Written by	Original release date	U.S. viewers (millions)
49	1	"My Bad"	Steve Shill	Chip Johannessen	September 26, 2010	1.77
50	2	"Hello, Bandit"	John Dahl	Scott Buck	October 3, 2010	1.70
51	3	"Practically Perfect"	Ernest Dickerson	Manny Coto	October 10, 2010	1.86
52	4	"Beauty and the Beast"	Milan Cheylov	Jim Leonard	October 17, 2010	1.79
53	5	"First Blood"	Romeo Tirone	Tim Schlattmann	October 24, 2010	1.94
54	6	"Everything Is Illumenated"	Steve Shill	Wendy West	October 31, 2010	1.63
55	7	"Circle Us"	John Dahl	Scott Buck	November 7, 2010	1.90
56	8	"Take It!"	Romeo Tirone	Manny Coto & Wendy West	November 14, 2010	1.94
57	9	"Teenage Wasteland"	Ernest Dickerson	Lauren Gussis	November 21, 2010	2.11
58	10	"In the Beginning"	Keith Gordon	Scott Reynolds	November 28, 2010	2.54
59	11	"Hop a Freighter"	John Dahl	Story by : Karen Campbell; Teleplay by : Scott Buck & Tim Schlattman	December 5, 2010	2.26
60	12	"The Big One"	Steve Shill	Chip Johannessen & Manny Coto	December 12, 2010	2.48

=== Season 6 (2011) ===
No. overall	No. in season	Title	Directed by	Written by	Original release date	U.S. viewers (millions)
61	1	"Those Kinds of Things"	John Dahl	Scott Buck	October 2, 2011	2.19
62	2	"Once Upon a Time..."	SJ Clarkson	Tim Schlattmann	October 9, 2011	1.71
63	3	"Smokey and the Bandit"	Stefan Schwartz	Manny Coto	October 16, 2011	1.50
64	4	"A Horse of a Different Color"	John Dahl	Lauren Gussis	October 23, 2011	1.89
65	5	"The Angel of Death"	SJ Clarkson	Scott Reynolds	October 30, 2011	1.80
66	6	"Just Let Go"	John Dahl	Jace Richdale	November 6, 2011	1.98
67	7	"Nebraska"	Romeo Tirone	Wendy West	November 13, 2011	1.99
68	8	"Sin of Omission"	Ernest Dickerson	Arika Lisanne Mittman	November 20, 2011	2.05
69	9	"Get Gellar"	Seith Mann	Karen Campbell	November 27, 2011	1.89
70	10	"Ricochet Rabbit"	Michael Lehmann	Jace Richdale & Lauren Gussis & Scott Reynolds	December 4, 2011	1.87
71	11	"Talk to the Hand"	Ernest Dickerson	Manny Coto & Tim Schlattmann	December 11, 2011	1.92
72	12	"This is the Way the World Ends"	John Dahl	Scott Buck & Wendy West	December 18, 2011	2.23

=== Season 7 (2012) ===
No. overall	No. in season	Title	Directed by	Written by	Original release date	U.S. viewers (millions)
73	1	"Are You...?"	John Dahl	Scott Buck	September 30, 2012	2.40
74	2	"Sunshine and Frosty Swirl"	Steve Shill	Manny Coto	October 7, 2012	2.10
75	3	"Buck the System"	Stefan Schwartz	Jace Richdale	October 14, 2012	1.98
76	4	"Run"	John Dahl	Wendy West	October 21, 2012	2.18
77	5	"Swim Deep"	Ernest Dickerson	Scott Reynolds	October 28, 2012	2.28
78	6	"Do the Wrong Thing"	Alik Sakharov	Lauren Gussis	November 4, 2012	1.99
79	7	"Chemistry"	Holly Dale	Manny Coto & Karen Campbell	November 11, 2012	2.01
80	8	"Argentina"	Romeo Tirone	Arika Lisanne Mittman	November 18, 2012	2.25
81	9	"Helter Skelter"	Steve Shill	Tim Schlattmann	November 25, 2012	2.12
82	10	"The Dark… Whatever"	Michael Lehmann	Lauren Gussis & Jace Richdale & Scott Reynolds	December 2, 2012	2.08
83	11	"Do You See What I See?"	John Dahl	Manny Coto & Wendy West	December 9, 2012	2.60
84	12	"Surprise, Motherfucker!"	Steve Shill	Scott Buck & Tim Schlattmann	December 16, 2012	2.75

=== Season 8 (2013) ===
No. overall	No. in season	Title	Directed by	Written by	Original release date	U.S. viewers (millions)
85	1	"A Beautiful Day"	Keith Gordon	Scott Buck	June 30, 2013	2.48
86	2	"Every Silver Lining..."	Michael C. Hall	Manny Coto	July 7, 2013	2.52
87	3	"What's Eating Dexter Morgan?"	Ernest Dickerson	Lauren Gussis	July 14, 2013	2.43
88	4	"Scar Tissue"	Stefan Schwartz	Tim Schlattmann	July 21, 2013	2.47
89	5	"This Little Piggy"	Romeo Tirone	Scott Reynolds	July 28, 2013	2.55
90	6	"A Little Reflection"	John Dahl	Jace Richdale	August 4, 2013	2.21
91	7	"Dress Code"	Alik Sakharov	Arika Lisanne Mittman	August 11, 2013	1.90
92	8	"Are We There Yet?"	Holly Dale	Wendy West	August 18, 2013	1.94
93	9	"Make Your Own Kind of Music"	John Dahl	Karen Campbell	August 25, 2013	2.28
94	10	"Goodbye Miami"	Steve Shill	Jace Richdale & Scott Reynolds	September 8, 2013	2.34
95	11	"Monkey in a Box"	Ernest Dickerson	Tim Schlattmann & Wendy West	September 15, 2013	2.40
96	12	"Remember the Monsters?"	Steve Shill	Scott Buck & Manny Coto	September 22, 2013	2.80

== Dexter: Early Cuts ==
In 2009, Showtime started releasing an animated Dexter webseries. Each story is told in several two-minute chapters, the first three of which were written by series writer and producer Lauren Gussis, and premiered in 2009. More episodes were released in 2010 and 2011.

=== Season 1 (2009–10) ===
No.	Title	Written by	Illustrated by	Original release date
1	"Alex Timmons: Chapter One"	Lauren Gussis	Kyle Baker	October 25, 2009
2	"Alex Timmons: Chapter Two"	Lauren Gussis	Kyle Baker	November 1, 2009
3	"Alex Timmons: Chapter Three"	Lauren Gussis	Kyle Baker	November 8, 2009
4	"Alex Timmons: Chapter Four"	Lauren Gussis	Kyle Baker	November 15, 2009
5	"Gene Marshall: Chapter One"	Lauren Gussis	Kyle Baker	November 15, 2009
6	"Gene Marshall: Chapter Two"	Lauren Gussis	Kyle Baker	November 22, 2009
7	"Gene Marshall: Chapter Three"	Lauren Gussis	Kyle Baker	November 29, 2009
8	"Gene Marshall: Chapter Four"	Lauren Gussis	Kyle Baker	December 6, 2009
9	"Cindy Landon: Chapter One"	Lauren Gussis	Kyle Baker	December 13, 2009
10	"Cindy Landon: Chapter Two"	Lauren Gussis	Kyle Baker	December 20, 2009
11	"Cindy Landon: Chapter Three"	Lauren Gussis	Kyle Baker	December 27, 2009
12	"Cindy Landon: Chapter Four"	Lauren Gussis	Kyle Baker	January 4, 2010

=== Season 2: Dark Echo (2010) ===
No.	Title	Written by	Illustrated by	Original release date
1	"Dark Echo: Chapter One"	Tim Schlattmann	Bill Sienkiewicz & David Mack	October 24, 2010
2	"Dark Echo: Chapter Two"	Tim Schlattmann	Bill Sienkiewicz & David Mack	October 24, 2010
3	"Dark Echo: Chapter Three"	Tim Schlattmann	Bill Sienkiewicz & David Mack	October 24, 2010
4	"Dark Echo: Chapter Four"	Tim Schlattmann	Bill Sienkiewicz & David Mack	October 24, 2010
5	"Dark Echo: Chapter Five"	Tim Schlattmann	Bill Sienkiewicz & David Mack	October 24, 2010
6	"Dark Echo: Chapter Six"	Tim Schlattmann	Bill Sienkiewicz & David Mack	October 24, 2010

=== Season 3: All in the Family (2012) ===
No.	Title	Written by	Illustrated by	Original release date
1	"All in the Family: Chapter 1"	Scott Reynolds	David Mack	August 21, 2012
2	"All in the Family: Chapter 2"	Scott Reynolds	David Mack	August 28, 2012
3	"All in the Family: Chapter 3"	Scott Reynolds	David Mack	September 4, 2012
4	"All in the Family: Chapter 4"	Scott Reynolds	David Mack	September 11, 2012
5	"All in the Family: Chapter 5"	Scott Reynolds	David Mack	September 18, 2012
6	"All in the Family: Chapter 6"	Scott Reynolds	David Mack	September 25, 2012

== Ratings ==
Dexter : U.S. viewers per episode (millions)

Season	Episode number											
Season	1	2	3	4	5	6	7	8	9	10	11	12
1	0.60	0.41	0.38	0.49	0.46	0.59	0.61	0.57	0.76	0.79	0.76	1.08
2	1.01	0.89	0.95	0.80	0.63	0.85	0.84	1.23	1.03	1.08	0.89	1.02
3	1.22	0.79	1.07	0.86	1.00	1.04	0.83	0.96	1.13	1.34	1.34	1.51
4	1.52	1.37	1.24	1.51	1.68	1.88	1.76	1.69	1.76	1.80	2.11	2.58
5	1.77	1.70	1.86	1.79	1.94	1.63	1.90	1.94	2.11	2.54	2.26	2.48
6	2.19	1.71	1.50	1.89	1.80	1.98	1.99	2.05	1.89	1.87	1.92	2.23
7	2.40	2.10	1.98	2.18	2.28	1.99	2.01	2.25	2.12	2.08	2.60	2.75
8	2.48	2.52	2.43	2.47	2.55	2.21	1.90	1.94	2.28	2.34	2.40	2.80

Audience measurement performed by Nielsen Media Research

== Home releases ==
Home releases of Dexter
Season	DVD release dates			Blu-ray release dates	
Season	Region 1	Region 2	Region 4	Region A	Region B
1	August 21, 2007	May 19, 2008	March 3, 2011	January 6, 2009	June 18, 2012
2	August 19, 2008	March 30, 2009	August 20, 2008	May 5, 2009	June 18, 2012
3	August 18, 2009	August 16, 2010	August 18, 2009	August 18, 2009	June 18, 2012
4	August 17, 2010	November 29, 2010	November 4, 2010	August 17, 2010	November 29, 2010
5	August 16, 2011	September 5, 2011	August 17, 2011	August 16, 2011	September 5, 2011
6	August 14, 2012	June 18, 2012	June 20, 2012	August 14, 2012	June 18, 2012
7	May 14, 2013	June 3, 2013	June 19, 2013	May 14, 2013	June 3, 2013
8	November 12, 2013	December 2, 2013	November 27, 2013	November 12, 2013	November 27, 2013

== See also ==
- Dexter: Original Sin § Episodes
- Dexter: New Blood § Episodes
- Dexter: Resurrection § Episodes
