= List of awards and nominations received by Dexter =

Dexter awards and nominations
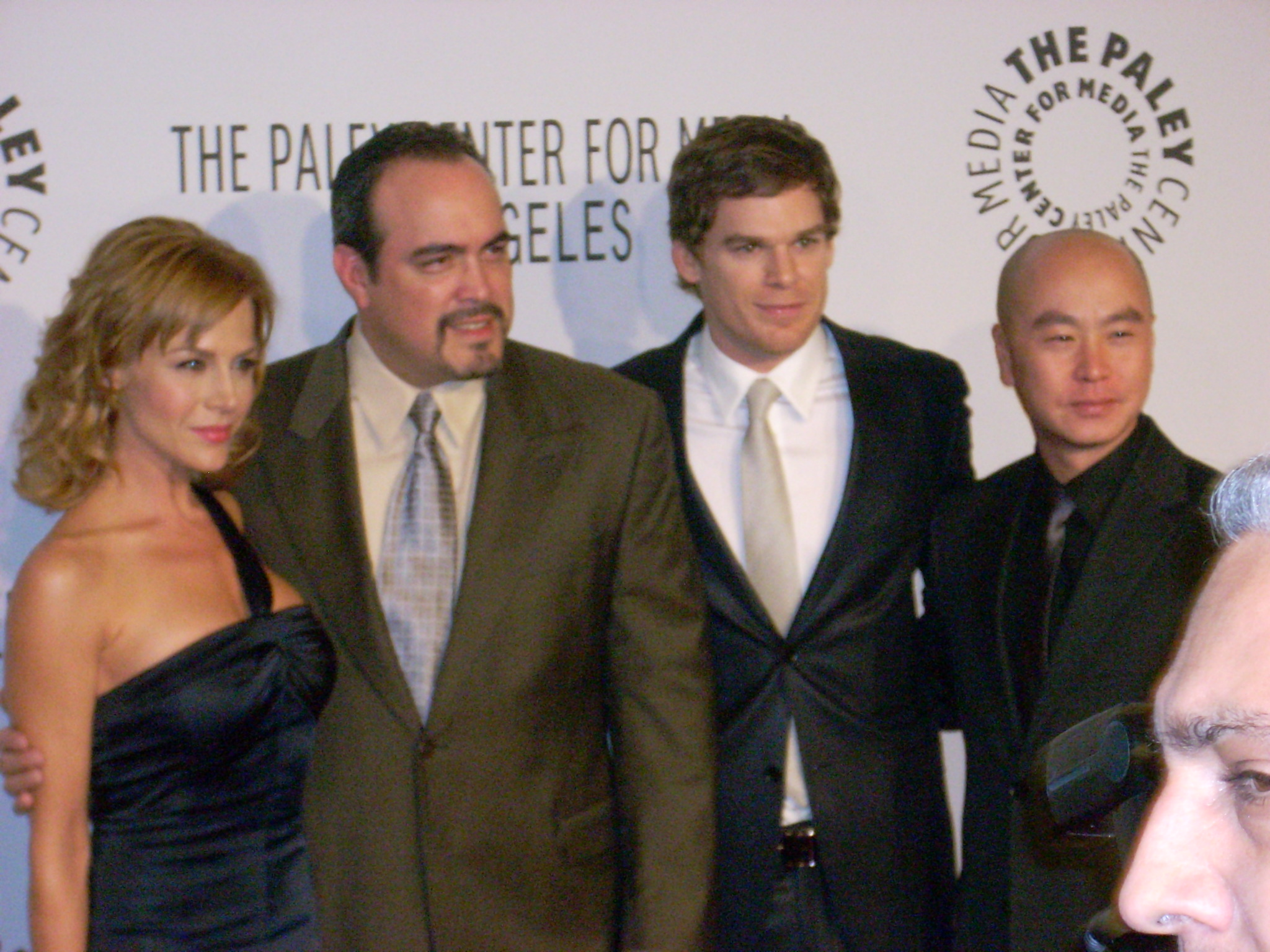
- From left to right, cast members Julie Benz, David Zayas, Michael C. Hall, and C.S. Lee
Awards and nominations
Award	Wins	Nominations
ALMA Awards	2	10
Artios Awards	0	3
BAFTA TV Awards	0	1
Cinema Audio Society Awards	0	1
Eddie Awards	1	3
Edgar Awards	0	2
Emmy Awards	4	25
Golden Globe Awards	2	10
Golden Reel Awards	0	1
IGN Awards	6	15
Imagen Awards	0	2
Peabody Awards	1	1
Producers Guild of America Awards	0	4
Satellite Awards	7	14
Saturn Awards	6	32
Screen Actors Guild Awards	1	12
TCA Awards	1	3
Writers Guild of America Award	0	5
Young Artist Awards	1	2

Totals (Note: Certain award groups do not simply award one winner. They acknowledge several different recipients, have runners-up, and have third place. Since this is a specific recognition and is different from losing an award, runner-up mentions are considered wins in this award tally. For simplification and to avoid errors, each award in this list has been presumed to have had a prior nomination.)
- Wins: 32
- Nominations: 114

Dexter is an American drama series that aired on Showtime from 2006 to 2013 and is based on the fictional character of the same name created by Jeff Lindsay. It has been nominated for a variety of awards, including eleven Primetime Emmy Awards (two wins), seven Golden Globe Awards (two wins), seven Screen Actors Guild Awards, (one win) and a Peabody Award.

Michael C. Hall, who portrays the title character, is the most-nominated cast member, with twenty-seven nominations; Jennifer Carpenter, who portrays Dexter's adoptive sister, Debra, is second, with seven nominations. Besides the show's cast members, the writers and producers of the show have also been nominated for various awards; writer, producer and showrunner Clyde Phillips has gained six nominations for his work on the show. By the end of its run, Dexter was nominated for over 100 awards and won 32.

== Emmy Awards ==
The Emmy Awards have been awarded annually since 1949 by the Academy of Television Arts & Sciences to honor excellence in television; they are considered to be the television equivalent to the Academy Awards. Dexter has been nominated for several Primetime Emmy Awards, which are awarded to honor excellence in acting and writing in prime time television, as well as Creative Arts Emmys, which are presented in recognition of technical and other related areas in American television programming. In 2007, Dexter received three Emmy Award nominations, all of which were Creative Arts Emmys. The show won two, one for editing and another for the show's opening titles. The following year, the show received five nominations, including nominations for Outstanding Drama Series and Outstanding Lead Actor in a Drama Series. Michael C. Hall was nominated five times but never won.

=== Primetime Emmy Awards ===
Primetime Emmy Awards
Year (Note: Year refers to the ceremony at which the award was given.)	Category	Nominee(s)	Episode (Note: A gray column indicates that no single episode was nominated for the award or the submitted episode is unknown.)	Result	Ref.
2008	Outstanding Drama Series	John Goldwyn, Sara Colleton, Clyde Phillips, Daniel Cerone, Melissa Rosenberg, Scott Buck, Robert Lloyd Lewis	—N/a	Nominated	
2008	Outstanding Lead Actor in a Drama Series	Michael C. Hall	"There's Something About Harry"	Nominated	
2009	Outstanding Drama Series	John Goldwyn, Sara Colleton, Clyde Phillips, Charles H. Eglee, Melissa Rosenberg, Scott Buck, Michael C. Hall, Adam E. Fierro, Robert Lloyd Lewis, Timothy Schlattman	—N/a	Nominated	
2009	Outstanding Lead Actor in a Drama Series	Michael C. Hall	"The Lion Sleeps Tonight"	Nominated	
2009	Outstanding Guest Actor in a Drama Series	Jimmy Smits	"Go Your Own Way"	Nominated	
2010	Outstanding Drama Series	John Goldwyn, Sara Colleton, Clyde Phillips, Charles H. Eglee, Melissa Rosenberg, Scott Buck, Michael C. Hall, Timothy Schlattman, Wendy West, Robert Lloyd Lewis, Lauren Gussis	—N/a	Nominated	
2010	Outstanding Lead Actor in a Drama Series	Michael C. Hall	—N/a	Nominated	
2010	Outstanding Directing in a Drama Series	Steve Shill	"The Getaway"	Won	
2010	Outstanding Guest Actor in a Drama Series	John Lithgow	"Road Kill"	Won	
2011	Outstanding Drama Series	John Goldwyn, Sara Colleton, Clyde Phillips, Charles H. Eglee, Melissa Rosenberg, Scott Buck, Michael C. Hall, Timothy Schlattman, Wendy West, Robert Lloyd Lewis, Lauren Gussis	—N/a	Nominated	
2011	Outstanding Lead Actor in a Drama Series	Michael C. Hall	—N/a	Nominated	
2011	Outstanding Guest Actress in a Drama Series	Julia Stiles	—N/a	Nominated	
2012	Outstanding Lead Actor in a Drama Series	Michael C. Hall	"Nebraska"	Nominated	

=== Creative Arts Emmy Awards ===
Creative Arts Emmy Awards
Year	Category	Nominee(s)	Episode	Result	Ref.
2007	Outstanding Main Title Theme Music	Rolfe Kent	—N/a	Nominated	
2007	Outstanding Single Camera Picture Editing for a Drama Series	Elena Maganini	"Dexter"	Won	
2007	Outstanding Main Title Design	Eric S. Anderson, Josh Bodnar, Lindsay Daniels, Colin Davis	—N/a	Won	
2008	Outstanding Sound Mixing for a Comedy or Drama Series (One-Hour)	Patrick Hanson, Elmo Ponsdomenech, Joe Earle	"It's Alive!"	Nominated	
2008	Outstanding Cinematography for a Series (One-Hour)	Romeo Tirone	"The British Invasion"	Nominated	
2008	Outstanding Art Direction for a Single-Camera Series	Anthony Cowley, Linda Spheeris	"That Night, A Forest Grew"	Nominated	
2010	Outstanding Casting for a Drama Series	Shawn Dawson	—N/a	Nominated	
2010	Outstanding Single Camera Picture Editing for a Drama Series	Matthew V. Colonna	"The Getaway"	Nominated	
2010	Outstanding Sound Mixing for a Comedy or Drama Series	James P. Clark, Elmo Ponsdomenech, Kevin Roache, Jeremy Balko	"Hello, Dexter Morgan"	Nominated	
2010	Outstanding Creative Achievement In Interactive Media – Fiction	Showtime Networks Inc.	Dexter Interactive	Nominated	
2011	Outstanding Single-Camera Picture Editing for a Drama Series	Louis F. Cioffi	"Take It!"	Nominated	
2011	Outstanding Sound Mixing for a Comedy or Drama Series (One Hour)	Kevin Roache, Peter Elia, Greg Agalsoff, Jeremy Balko	"Take It!"	Nominated	

== Golden Globe Awards ==
Dexter was nominated for ten Golden Globe Awards, which are awarded annually by the Hollywood Foreign Press Association to honor the best in film and television. Michael C. Hall has received five acting nominations. The show was nominated for Best Television Series – Drama in 2009 and 2010. Both Michael C. Hall and newcomer to the show, John Lithgow received Golden Globe Awards for their roles in the fourth season.

Golden Globe awards
Year	Award	Nominee(s)	Result	Ref.
2007	Best Performance by an Actor In a Television Series – Drama	Michael C. Hall	Nominated	
2008	Best Performance by an Actor In a Television Series – Drama	Michael C. Hall	Nominated	
2009	Best Performance by an Actor In a Television Series – Drama	Michael C. Hall	Nominated	
2009	Best Television Series – Drama	—N/a	Nominated	
2010	Best Performance by an Actor In a Television Series – Drama	Michael C. Hall	Won	
2010	Best Performance by an Actor In a Supporting Role in a Series	John Lithgow	Won	
2010	Best Television Series – Drama	—N/a	Nominated	
2011	Best Performance by an Actor in a Television Series – Drama	Michael C. Hall	Nominated	
2011	Best Performance by an Actress in a Supporting Role in a Series	Julia Stiles	Nominated	
2011	Best Television Series – Drama	—N/a	Nominated	

== Satellite Awards ==
The Satellite Awards, are presented annually by the International Press Academy to the best in cinema and television. Dexter has won seven, including Best TV Series twice. In 2007, the show received four nominations, in the categories of Best Actor, Best TV Series, Outstanding DVD Release of a Television Show, and Best Supporting Actor in a TV Series. The show won all of its nominations, making Dexter the most victorious show of that year's ceremony.

Satellite Awards
Year	Category	Nominee(s)	Result	Ref.
2006	Best TV Series – Drama	—N/a	Nominated	
2006	Best Actor – TV Drama Series	Michael C. Hall	Nominated	
2006	Best Actress in a Supporting Role in a Series, Mini-Series or Motion Picture Made for Television	Julie Benz	Won	
2007	Best TV Series – Drama	—N/a	Won	
2007	Best Actor – TV Drama Series	Michael C. Hall	Won	
2007	Outstanding DVD Release of a Television Show	Dexter season 1	Won	
2007	Best Actor in a Supporting Role in a Series, Mini-Series or Motion Picture Made for Television	David Zayas	Won	
2008	Best TV Series – Drama	—N/a	Won	
2008	Best Actor – TV Drama Series	Michael C. Hall	Nominated	
2008	Best Actor in a Supporting Role in a Series, Mini-Series or Motion Picture Made for Television	Jimmy Smits	Nominated	
2009	Best Actor in a Supporting Role in a Series, Mini-Series or Motion Picture Made for Television	John Lithgow	Won	
2009	Best DVD Extras	Dexter season 3	Nominated	
2010	Best Actor in a Series, Drama	Michael C. Hall	Nominated	
2010	Best Television Series, Drama	—N/a	Nominated	

== Saturn Awards ==
The Saturn Awards are presented by the Academy of Science Fiction, Fantasy and Horror Films, and honor the best in science fiction and fantasy films and television shows. Dexter has been nominated for over thirty Saturn awards and has won six, it was nominated for Best Syndicated/Cable Television Series seven consecutive times winning once in 2008.

Saturn Awards
Year	Category	Nominee(s)	Result	Ref.
2007	Best Television Actor	Michael C. Hall	Won	
2007	Best Supporting Television Actor	James Remar	Nominated	
2007	Best Supporting Television Actress	Jennifer Carpenter	Nominated	
2008	Best Syndicated/Cable Television Series	—N/a	Won	
2008	Best Television Actor	Michael C. Hall	Nominated	
2008	Best Supporting Television Actor	Erik King	Nominated	
2008	Best Supporting Television Actress	Jennifer Carpenter	Nominated	
2008	Best Supporting Television Actress	Jaime Murray	Nominated	
2009	Best Syndicated/Cable Television Series	—N/a	Nominated	
2009	Best Television Actor	Michael C. Hall	Nominated	
2009	Best Guest Starring Role in a Television Series	Jimmy Smits	Won	
2009	Best Supporting Television Actress	Jennifer Carpenter	Won	
2010	Best Syndicated/Cable Television Series	—N/a	Nominated	
2010	Best Television Actor	Michael C. Hall	Nominated	
2010	Best Guest Starring Role in a Television Series	John Lithgow	Nominated	
2010	Best Supporting Television Actress	Jennifer Carpenter	Nominated	
2010	Best Supporting Television Actress	Julie Benz	Won	
2011	Best Syndicated/Cable Television Series	—N/a	Nominated	
2011	Best Television Actor	Michael C. Hall	Nominated	
2011	Best Supporting Television Actress	Jennifer Carpenter	Nominated	
2012	Best Syndicated/Cable Television Series	—N/a	Nominated	
2012	Best Television Actor	Michael C. Hall	Nominated	
2012	Best Guest Starring Role in a Television Series	Edward James Olmos	Nominated	
2012	Best Supporting Television Actress	Jennifer Carpenter	Nominated	
2013	Best Syndicated/Cable Television Series	—N/a	Nominated	
2013	Best Television Actor	Michael C. Hall	Nominated	
2013	Best Guest Starring Role in a Television Series	Ray Stevenson	Nominated	
2013	Best Guest Starring Role in a Television Series	Yvonne Strahovski	Won	
2013	Best Supporting Television Actress	Jennifer Carpenter	Nominated	
2014	Best Syndicated/Cable Television Series	—N/a	Nominated	
2014	Best Guest Starring Role in a Television Series	Charlotte Rampling	Nominated	
2014	Best Supporting Television Actress	Jennifer Carpenter	Nominated	

== Screen Actors Guild Awards ==
The Screen Actors Guild Awards are presented annually by the Screen Actors Guild to honor acting in film and television. Dexter has been nominated for ten; Michael C. Hall received nominations for Outstanding Performance by a Male Actor in a Drama Series six times, winning the award in 2010. The cast of the show was for Outstanding Performance by an Ensemble in a Drama Series, in 2009 through 2011.

Screen Actors Guild Awards
Year	Category	Nominee(s)	Result	Ref.
2007	Outstanding Performance by a Male Actor in a Drama Series	Michael C. Hall	Nominated	
2008	Outstanding Performance by a Male Actor in a Drama Series	Michael C. Hall	Nominated	
2009	Outstanding Performance by a Male Actor in a Drama Series	Michael C. Hall	Nominated	
2009	Outstanding Performance by an Ensemble in a Drama Series	—N/a	Nominated	
2010	Outstanding Performance by a Male Actor in a Drama Series	Michael C. Hall	Won	
2010	Outstanding Performance by an Ensemble in a Drama Series	—N/a	Nominated	
2010	Outstanding Performance by a Stunt Ensemble in a Series	—N/a	Nominated	
2011	Outstanding Performance by a Male Actor in a Drama Series	Michael C. Hall	Nominated	
2011	Outstanding Performance by an Ensemble in a Drama Series	—N/a	Nominated	
2011	Outstanding Performance by a Stunt Ensemble in a Series	—N/a	Nominated	
2012	Outstanding Performance by a Male Actor in a Drama Series	Michael C. Hall	Nominated	
2012	Outstanding Performance by a Stunt Ensemble in a Series	—N/a	Nominated	

== Writers Guild of America Awards ==
The Writers Guild of America Awards are presented annually to film and television writers by the Writers Guild of America. Dexter has been nominated for five awards, including "Dramatic Series" three times, but has not won any. Timothy Schlattmann and Scott Reynolds have both gained individual nominations.

Writers Guild of America Awards
Year	Category	Nominee(s)	Episode	Result	Ref.
2008	Dramatic Series	Scott Buck, Daniel Cerone, Drew Z. Greenberg, Lauren Gussis, Kevin Maynard, Clyde Phillips, Scott Reynolds, Melissa Rosenberg, Timothy Schlattmann.	—N/a	Nominated	
2008	Episodic Drama	Timothy Schlattmann	"The Dark Defender"	Nominated	
2009	Dramatic Series	Scott Buck, Daniel Cerone, Charles H. Eglee, Adam Fierro, Lauren Gussis, Clyde Phillips, Scott Reynolds, Melissa Rosenberg, Timothy Schlattmann	—N/a	Nominated	
2009	Episodic Drama	Scott Reynolds	"There's Something About Harry"	Nominated	
2010	Dramatic Series	Scott Buck, Charles H. Eglee, Lauren Gussis, Clyde Phillips, Scott Reynolds, Melissa Rosenberg, Timothy Schlattmann, Wendy West	—N/a	Nominated	

== Other awards ==
Other Awards
Year	Award	Category	Nominee	Result	Ref.
2007	ALMA Awards	Outstanding Supporting Actress – Television Series, Mini-Series or Television Movie	Lauren Vélez	Nominated	
2008	ALMA Awards	Outstanding Supporting Actress – Television Series, Mini-Series or Television Movie	Lauren Vélez	Nominated	
2009	ALMA Awards	Outstanding Supporting Actress – Television Series, Mini-Series or Television Movie	Lauren Vélez	Won	
2009	ALMA Awards	Outstanding Supporting Actor – Television Series, Mini-Series or Television Movie	Jimmy Smits	Nominated	
2009	ALMA Awards	Outstanding Supporting Actor – Television Series, Mini-Series or Television Movie	David Zayas	Nominated	
2011	ALMA Awards	Outstanding Supporting Actress – Television Series, Mini-Series or Television Movie	Lauren Vélez	Nominated	
2011	ALMA Awards	Outstanding Supporting Actor – Television Series, Mini-Series or Television Movie	David Zayas	Nominated	
2012	ALMA Awards	Outstanding Supporting Actress – Television Series, Mini-Series or Television Movie	Lauren Vélez	Nominated	
2012	ALMA Awards	Outstanding Supporting Actor – Television Series, Mini-Series or Television Movie	David Zayas	Nominated	
2013	ALMA Awards	Special Achievement in Television	Aimee Garcia, Lauren Vélez, David Zayas	Won	
2007	Artios Awards	Best Dramatic Episodic Casting	Shawn Dawson, Lori Wyman	Nominated	
2007	Artios Awards	Best Dramatic Pilot Casting	Deborah Aquila, Mary Tricia Wood, Jennifer Smith, Julie Tucker, Lori Wyman	Nominated	
2008	Artios Awards	Outstanding Achievement in Casting – Television Series – Drama	Shawn Dawson	Nominated	
2009	BAFTA TV Awards	Best International Programme	John Goldwyn, Sara Colleton, Clyde Phillips, Robert Lloyd Lewis	Nominated	
2009	Cinema Audio Society Awards	Outstanding Achievement in Sound Mixing for Television Series	Roger Pietschmann, Elmo Ponsdomenech, Kevin Roache; "Turning Biminese"	Nominated	
2008	Eddie Awards	Best Edited One-Hour Series for Non-Commercial Television	Stewart Schill: "It's Alive!"	Nominated	
2010	Eddie Awards	Best Edited One-Hour Series for Non-Commercial Television	Stewart Schill: "Living the Dream"	Nominated	
2010	Eddie Awards	Best Edited One-Hour Series for Non-Commercial Television	Louis F. Cioffi: "Remains to be Seen"	Won	
2007	Edgar Awards	Best Television Episode Teleplay	Clyde Phillips: "Crocodile"	Nominated	
2008	Edgar Awards	Best Television Episode Teleplay	Daniel Cerone: "It's Alive!"	Nominated	
2008	Golden Reel Awards	Best Sound Editing – Sound Effects and Foley for Short Form Television	Fred Judkins, Andrew Ellerd, Gary Megregian, Stuart Martin, Dale W. Perry: "The British Invasion"	Nominated	
2006	IGN	Best Television Program	—N/a	Nominated	
2006	IGN	Best New Show	—N/a	Won	
2006	IGN	Best Actor	Michael C. Hall	Won	
2006	IGN	Best Villain	Christian Camargo	Won	
2006	IGN	Best Character	Dexter Morgan	Won	
2007	IGN	Best Television Program	—N/a	Won	
2007	IGN	Best Storyline	"The Hunt for the Bay Harbour Butcher"	Won	
2007	IGN	Best Writing	—N/a	Nominated	
2008	IGN	Best Television Program	—N/a	Nominated	
2008	IGN	Best Actor	Michael C. Hall	Nominated	
2008	IGN	Best Character	Dexter Morgan	Nominated	
2008	IGN	Best Storyline	"Dexter's friendship with Miguel"	Nominated	
2009	IGN	Best Television Series"	—N/a	Nominated	
2009	IGN	Best Performance	Jennifer Carpenter	Nominated	
2009	IGN	Best Storyline	"The Trinity Killer	Nominated	
2007	Imagen Awards	Best Supporting Actor/Television	David Zayas	Nominated	
2009	Imagen Awards	Best Supporting Actor/Television	Jimmy Smits	Nominated	
2007	Peabody Awards	Excellence in Television	—N/a	Won	
2009	Producers Guild of America Awards	Television Producer of the Year Award in Episodic Drama	Michael Cuesta, Sara Colleton, John Goldwyn, Robert Lloyd Lewis, Clyde Phillips	Nominated	
2010	Producers Guild of America Awards	Television Producer of the Year Award in Episodic Drama	Sara Colleton, John Goldwyn, Robert Lloyd Lewis, Clyde Phillips	Nominated	
2011	Producers Guild of America Awards	Television Producer of the Year Award in Episodic Drama	Sara Colleton, John Goldwyn, Robert Lloyd Lewis, Clyde Phillips	Nominated	
2012	Producers Guild of America Awards	Television Producer of the Year Award in Episodic Drama	Sara Colleton, John Goldwyn, Robert Lloyd Lewis, Clyde Phillips	Nominated	
2007	TCA Awards	Outstanding New Program of the Year	—N/a	Nominated	
2007	TCA Awards	Individual Achievement in Drama	Michael C. Hall	Won	
2010	TCA Awards	Individual Achievement in Drama	John Lithgow	Nominated	
2007	Young Artist Awards	Best Performance in a TV Series (Comedy or Drama) – Recurring Young Actor	Daniel Goldman	Won	
2008	Young Artist Awards	Best Performance in a TV Series – Recurring Young Actress	Christina Robinson	Nominated	

== External sources ==
- Dexter at IMDb
