= Hop a Freighter =

- Dexter episode
- Episode no.: Season 5 Episode 11
- Directed by: John Dahl
- Story by: Karen Campbell
- Teleplay by: Scott Buck; Tim Schlattmann
- Cinematography by: Romeo Tirone
- Editing by: Louis Cioffi
- Original release date: December 5, 2010
- Running time: 47 minutes

Guest appearances
- Julia Stiles as Lumen Pierce (special guest star); Jonny Lee Miller as Jordan Chase; Peter Weller as Stan Liddy; Maria Doyle Kennedy as Sonya; Angela Bettis as Emily Birch; Leslie Grossman as Laura Mendell

Episode chronology
← Previous "In the Beginning"	Next → "The Big One"
- Dexter season 5

"Hop a Freighter" is the eleventh episode of the fifth season of the American crime drama television series Dexter. It is the 59th overall episode of the series and was written by executive producer Scott Buck and co-executive producer Tim Schlattmann from a story by Karen Campbell, and was directed by John Dahl. It originally aired on Showtime on December 5, 2010.

Set in Miami, the series centers on Dexter Morgan, a forensic technician specializing in bloodstain pattern analysis for the fictional Miami Metro Police Department. Dexter leads a secret parallel life as a vigilante serial killer, hunting down murderers who have not been adequately punished by the justice system due to corruption or legal technicalities. In the episode, he and Lumen set out to kill Jordan Chase, while Liddy prepares to catch Dexter to recoup his own career.

According to Nielsen Media Research, the episode was seen by an estimated 2.26 million household viewers and gained a 1.1/3 ratings share among adults aged 18–49. The episode received positive reviews from critics, who praised its cliffhanger ending, although some considered the episode rushed.

== Plot ==
Jordan Chase (Jonny Lee Miller) has been cleared of direct involvement in the Barrel Girls case by a DNA test, but Debra (Jennifer Carpenter) continues to suspect him. Dexter (Michael C. Hall) and Lumen (Julia Stiles) begin planning their strategy to kill Chase. Suddenly, Dexter notices surveillance cameras in his apartment and finds one with a "property of Miami Metro" sticker. He starts trying to identify which of the vans in the vicinity is surveilling him.

Liddy (Peter Weller) asks Quinn (Desmond Harrington) to help him in his case against Dexter to salvage his career, but Quinn refuses to get involved. The Barrel Girls case gains traction when Masuka (C. S. Lee) correctly guesses that the vigilante killed Tilden next door, and Debra conjectures that the vigilante is the escaped 13th victim who is acting with the help of a boyfriend. Dexter investigates the surveillance equipment, discovering Quinn's signature. He and Lumen break into Quinn's place and discover the photos taken by Liddy. Debra and Quinn question Dan Mendell's wife Laura (Leslie Grossman), finding out that Dan has known Jordan Chase since childhood, under his previous name of Eugene Greer. Angel (David Zayas) has also linked Chase to Tilden.

Having identified the only remaining van, Dexter prepares to sedate the owner, whom he believes to be Quinn. Instead he is ambushed by Liddy with a taser. Liddy calls Quinn and attempts to blackmail Dexter into confessing, which he needs because he's been kicked off the police force. Instead, Dexter fights back and manages to kill him. Quinn arrives, approaches the van, and leaves when the now-dead Liddy fails to pick up, unaware that a drop of Liddy's blood fell in his shoe.

Emily (Angela Bettis), acting at the behest of Jordan Chase, lures Lumen to her house, where Chase captures her. After destroying Liddy's evidence, Dexter receives Lumen's message about Emily's call and goes to find her. At Emily's house, Chase questions Lumen ineffectively, gets angry, and murders Emily for witnessing his impotence. By the time Dexter reaches the house, he finds Emily's body, a blood trail, and Lumen's knife, but no Lumen or Chase.

== Production ==
=== Development ===
The episode was written by executive producer Scott Buck and co-executive producer Tim Schlattmann from a story by Karen Campbell, and was directed by John Dahl. This was Buck's 12th writing credit, Schlattmann's tenth writing credit, Campbell's first writing credit, and Dahl's seventh directing credit.

== Reception ==
=== Viewers ===
In its original American broadcast, "Hop a Freighter" was seen by an estimated 2.26 million household viewers with a 1.1/3 in the 18–49 demographics. This means that 1.1 percent of all households with televisions watched the episode, while 3 percent of all of those watching television at the time of the broadcast watched it. This was a 12% decrease in viewership from the previous episode, which was watched by an estimated 2.54 million household viewers with a 1.1/3 in the 18–49 demographics.

=== Critical reviews ===
"Hop a Freighter" received positive reviews. Matt Fowler of IGN gave the episode an "amazing" 9 out of 10, and wrote, "The scene, where Dexter was stuck in the van, having to be dead quiet, locking the doors because Quinn was right outside was perfectly done, and having Dexter slow-knife Liddy just seconds before Quinn walked up was even better. Man, there's nothing worse than a slow-knifing. I still have trouble watching that scene in Saving Private Ryan where Adam Goldberg gets skewered."

Emily St. James of The A.V. Club gave the episode a "C+" grade and wrote, "the Dexter and Lumen relationship has been the most fascinating thing in the show this season, but now that the two are in love, there's a definite sapping of tension out of the relationship. We've always known Lumen would need to leave one way or another; the question has stopped being who Dexter would be to her when she left and has boiled down to something far less interesting: How will she leave?" Alan Sepinwall of HitFix wrote, "Season five had found itself a nice little groove in the last few weeks, but “Hop a Freighter” erased a lot of the goodwill that recent episodes had generated. It's not that it was bad, but rather that it was predictable in that way that Dexter seasons always are. And it dashed any hope that the slightly tweaked format of the season would lead to a significantly different ending."

Lizzy Goodman of Vulture wrote, "The details of Harrison's party remain woefully underplanned but Dexter is also breaking the code left and right. Killing people in broad daylight in parked cars? Disposing of damning evidence by tossing it casually into the water three feet from where you committed the murder? Harry would so not be pleased. But he's not around right now to say anything. And the central questions about who Dexter really is and what kind of life he can reasonably sustain remain as unanswered as ever." Sandra Gonzalez of Entertainment Weekly wrote, "We've seen the weave of Jordan Chase's troubled psyche fraying at the edges in recent episodes. As Lumen and Dexter and the Miami police have threatened to crumble the house of crazy cards he's built so carefully, he's become agitated, annoyed, and on edge."

Gina DiNunno of TV Guide wrote, "Dexter arrives to find blood everywhere, and is somewhat relieved to discover Emily's body instead of Lumen's. He follows another trail of blood, and finds the knife he gave Lumen. A look of rage on Dexter's face is absolutely bone-chilling." Billy Grifter of Den of Geek wrote, "This was the key narrative thread that connected events in "Hop A Freighter", which brought many plot lines to an end and moved the story into a whole new phase for next week's season end."

Claire Zulkey of the Los Angeles Times wrote, "After Sunday night's strong episode, I have high hopes for the finale. I think the straightforward, rather predictable plot would be for Dexter to kill Jordan and then for Lumen to finally head home, but my fingers are crossed that the season will end on a much more twisted note." Television Without Pity gave the episode an "A" grade.
