= Hungry Man =

Hungry Man may refer to:

- Hungry-Man, a TV dinner brand produced by Swanson
- Hungry Man (Dexter), an episode of the American television series Dexter
- Hungry Man Productions, an international commercial marketing and production company
