= Hello, Dexter Morgan =

- Dexter episode
- Episode no.: Season 4 Episode 11
- Directed by: S. J. Clarkson
- Written by: Scott Buck; Lauren Gussis
- Cinematography by: Romeo Tirone
- Editing by: Louis Cioffi
- Original release date: December 6, 2009
- Running time: 51 minutes

Guest appearances
- John Lithgow as Arthur Mitchell (special guest star); Geoff Pierson as Thomas Matthews; Courtney Ford as Christine Hill; Rick Peters as Elliot Larson; Jake Short as Scott Smith; Chad Todhunter as Kyle Butler

Episode chronology
← Previous "Lost Boys"	Next → "The Getaway"
- Dexter season 4

"Hello, Dexter Morgan" is the eleventh episode of the fourth season of the American crime drama television series Dexter. It is the 47th overall episode of the series and was written by executive producer Scott Buck and producer Lauren Gussis, and was directed by S. J. Clarkson. It originally aired on Showtime on December 6, 2009.

Set in Miami, the series centers on Dexter Morgan, a forensic technician specializing in bloodstain pattern analysis for the fictional Miami Metro Police Department, who leads a secret parallel life as a vigilante serial killer, hunting down murderers who have not been adequately punished by the justice system due to corruption or legal technicalities. In the episode, Dexter must deal with Trinity himself before Miami Metro discovers more evidence, while Trinity himself tries to find Dexter. Meanwhile, Christine is confronted over her connection to Trinity.

According to Nielsen Media Research, the episode was seen by an estimated 2.11 million household viewers and gained a 1.1/3 ratings share among adults aged 18–49, becoming the most watched episode of the series by then, as well as the first one to cross 2 million viewers. The episode received highly positive reviews from critics, with Jennifer Carpenter receiving high praise for her performance in the episode.

== Plot ==
As Batista (David Zayas) interrogates Christine (Courtney Ford), Dexter (Michael C. Hall) begins to consider framing someone as a decoy to the police, giving him time to kill Arthur (John Lithgow). Meanwhile, Arthur sees a news report on the return of the boy he abducted and realizes that Dexter has not told the police about him. He phones Dexter and asks what he wants; Dexter, improvising, tells him that he wants $50,000 in 24 hours or he will tell the police that Arthur is a pedophile. Arthur takes out a phonebook and researches the various Kyle Butlers of Miami, telling Dexter that he will be in touch.

Debra (Jennifer Carpenter) tries to get Quinn (Desmond Harrington) to see that Christine isn't who she told him she was. When Dexter leaves the station, Quinn reacts suspiciously, asking him where he's really going. Captain Matthews confronts Batista and LaGuerta (Lauren Vélez) with a video of the two kissing, proving they were lying in their affidavits. He tells them that they have committed perjury and will need to find new careers. Dexter goes through possible suspect files to decide which one he should frame for Arthur's murders. Meanwhile, Arthur breaks into Kyle Butler #1's house and kills him. Dexter arrives for an appointment with Rita (Julie Benz) for marriage counseling but gets called to a crime scene as soon as he arrives. Rita then confesses that she and Elliot kissed.

Dexter arrives at the scene and learns the victim is a Kyle Butler, causing him to realize that Arthur is after him. Meanwhile, Debra and Batista search Christine's apartment and find a collection of postcards from her father, which they put together as past Trinity kill sites. Dexter goes to Kyle Butler #2's house and renders him unconscious via injection in order to catch Arthur. However, as soon as Arthur arrives, he realizes that the occupant is not Dexter and leaves before Dexter can grab him. Batista shows Christine the postcards, prompting her to ask for a lawyer. Quinn realizes that she was using him to get close to the case; Debra tells him not to beat himself up. Dexter arrives at the home of Stan Beaudry and finds that he has taken a trip to Jacksonville. Instead of driving there, he decides to return home and talk with Rita, forgiving her offhandedly for kissing Elliot. For her part, Rita is concerned that Dexter doesn't seem to care that she nearly cheated on him.

Dexter is called into the station and Debra attempts to get Christine to talk. She tells Christine about her own issues with her father, Harry, but Christine reveals nothing. Dexter arrives and acts as witness to LaGuerta and Batista's marriage. He rushes off afterwards to kill Beaudry. After a phone call from Arthur, he intercepts and kills Beaudry, then plants evidence in Beaudry's home and truck to link him to the Trinity killings. Dexter returns home and punches Elliot for kissing Rita; she witnesses it and prepares some ice for his hand, telling him that she is glad that he cared. LaGuerta and Batista inform Matthews of their marriage, telling him that a perjury charge won't stand up in court.

Christine calls Arthur to tell him that she's in trouble, and he angrily tells her to never call him again and that he is sorry she had ever been born. Meanwhile, the team finds the evidence Dexter planted. Debra is informed that Christine wishes to talk to her, and she and Quinn rush to her apartment, believing that she wishes to confess. She tells Debra that she shot her and killed Lundy, and asks Debra to forgive her. When Deb refuses, Christine pulls a gun from under a cushion and commits suicide.

After hearing a phone call from Arthur, Dexter goes to the video arcade to hunt for him, unaware that Arthur is in fact following him back to the station. Arthur infiltrates the station by stealing a visitor's badge and wanders around, looking at photos of his work. Debra tells Dexter that she is afraid to erase Lundy's name from the board because then it will all be over. Debra wipes it off after some thought and Dexter goes to his office. To his horror, he spots Arthur walking through the squad room and goes to confront him. Arthur looks at Dexter's ID badge and says, "Hello... Dexter Morgan."

== Production ==
=== Development ===
The episode was written by executive producer Scott Buck and producer Lauren Gussis, and was directed by S. J. Clarkson. This was Buck's ninth writing credit, Gussis' sixth writing credit, and Clarkson's first directing credit.

== Reception ==
=== Viewers ===
In its original American broadcast, "Hello, Dexter Morgan" was seen by an estimated 2.11 million household viewers with a 1.1/3 in the 18–49 demographics. This means that 1.1 percent of all households with televisions watched the episode, while 3 percent of all of those watching television at the time of the broadcast watched it. This was a 17% increase in viewership from the previous episode, which was watched by an estimated 1.80 million household viewers with a 0.8/2 in the 18–49 demographics.

=== Critical reviews ===
"Hello, Dexter Morgan" received highly positive reviews from critics. Matt Fowler of IGN gave the episode a "great" 8.8 out of 10, and wrote, "After last week's race against time to save the life of a 10-year-old boy, we're given another, well, race against time. Dexter's a wonderful series, but I'm feeling a bit ragged being faced with another episode where Dexter has to constantly be elsewhere. Thank god he's got a job that, for the most part, allows him to take off to go and "do a thing.""

Emily St. James of The A.V. Club gave the episode a "B+" grade and wrote, "After a meandering midsection this season, it really feels like the writers of Dexter are pushing forward into some new territory with all of their characters, and I'm hoping they'll keep that promise next week and not just end this season like they've ended every other season."

Alan Sepinwall wrote, "On the one hand, Jennifer Carpenter continues her strong work this season, and the final sequence was one of the more exciting cat-and-mouse moments the show has done. On the other hand, to get to that moment, Dexter has to get an IQ transplant from Peter Petrelli for most of the episode. Hopefully, it all leads to a finale that doesn't end the exact way we all assume that it will." Kristal Hawkins of Vulture wrote, "Dexter had an exciting few weeks, but it couldn't last forever. The season's penultimate episode cuts the good times short and replaces them with an extended (and unrewarding) riff on identity."

Billy Grifter of Den of Geek wrote, "The setup for the final Dexter of this season is complete. What chaos that will unleash is difficult to imagine, but Arthur is obviously the most dangerous foe Dexter’s encountered." Gina DiNunno of TV Guide wrote, "With Miami Metro closer than ever to learning the identity of Trinity, Dexter desperately tries to lead the cops astray so he can keep his secret life under wraps and kill of Arthur Mitchell himself."

Danny Gallagher of TV Squad wrote, "Once again, Jennifer Carpenter shined as the still-grieving Debra who hasn't completely gotten over Lundy's murder. The scene where she has to almost throw herself at the dry-erase board to erase Lundy's name from the list of unsolved murders was toned down a bit compared to the breakdown she had just after his murder, but just as heartfelt and genuine." Television Without Pity gave the episode a "B" grade.

S. J. Clarkson submitted this episode for consideration for Outstanding Directing for a Drama Series at the 62nd Primetime Emmy Awards.
