= Do You Take Dexter Morgan? =

- Dexter episode
- Dexter Morgan (Michael C. Hall) and Rita Bennet (Julie Benz) at their wedding accompanied by family and colleagues.
- Episode no.: Season 3 Episode 12
- Directed by: Keith Gordon
- Written by: Scott Buck
- Cinematography by: Romeo Tirone
- Editing by: Matthew V. Colonna; Louis Cioffi
- Original release date: December 14, 2008
- Running time: 51 minutes

Guest appearances
- Jimmy Smits as Miguel Prado (special guest star); Desmond Harrington as Joey Quinn; David Ramsey as Anton Briggs; Valerie Cruz as Sylvia Prado; Kristin Dattilo as Barbara Gianna; Jesse Borrego as George King; Jason Manuel Olazabal as Ramon Prado; Jane McLean as Tammy Okama; Frankie Jay Allison as Detective Pratt; James Moses Black as Sergeant Jesse Whitaker

Episode chronology
← Previous "I Had a Dream"	Next → "Living the Dream"
- Dexter season 3

"Do You Take Dexter Morgan?" is the twelfth episode and season finale of the third season of the American crime drama television series Dexter. It is the 36th overall episode of the series and was written by co-executive producer Scott Buck, and was directed by Keith Gordon. It originally aired on Showtime on December 14, 2008.

Set in Miami, the series centers on Dexter Morgan, a forensic technician specializing in bloodstain pattern analysis for the fictional Miami Metro Police Department, who leads a secret parallel life as a vigilante serial killer, hunting down murderers who have not been adequately punished by the justice system due to corruption or legal technicalities. In the episode, Dexter and Rita prepare for their wedding, just as Ramon and George King target Dexter.

According to Nielsen Media Research, the episode was seen by an estimated 1.51 million household viewers and gained a 0.7 ratings share among adults aged 18–49, becoming the most watched episode of the series by that point. The episode received positive reviews from critics, who praised the performances and set-up for the new season, although many were unsatisfied with The Skinner's storyline.

== Plot ==
The corpse of Miguel (Jimmy Smits) is found in a park, with Dexter (Michael C. Hall) staging it to frame The Skinner. Ramón (Jason Manuel Olazabal) is furious, and forbids Dexter from attending his funeral. He later discovers that someone matching Ramón's description sneaked into his apartment.

Miami Metro continues the pursuit of George King (Jesse Borrego), who has been identified as Jorge Orozco, a Nicaraguan militant. Angel (David Zayas) writes a recommendation letter for Debra (Jennifer Carpenter) as a detective. However, he is upset when he learns that she had sex with Anton (David Ramsey) during his time as a key witness. When Debra brings up his activities in hiring prostitutes, Angel reveals it to LaGuerta (Lauren Vélez). Debra defends her decision, and LaGuerta accepts her petition to become a detective. LaGuerta talks with Dexter about exposing Miguel's role in Ellen Wolf's death, as a highway is planned to be named in his honor. Dexter asks her to wait, as he fears a premature decision could ruin the image of their department.

As he prepares for his wedding, Dexter sees that Rita's mother told her "third time's the charm" and is curious over its meaning. He checks the database and discovers that Rita (Julie Benz) was actually married before Paul, which lasted for a few months when she was sixteen. Dexter is pursued by a car, and tricks him into crashing his car, with Debra later discovering that the driver was King. During a dinner, Ramón shows up with a gun aiming at Dexter, and is subsequently arrested. Dexter visits him in county jail, and discovers that Miguel had him act as his bodyguard. He expresses his concerns over having to live in Miguel's shadow, always seeking to avoid a bad future for his family. Dexter and Ramón make peace with each other, and Dexter abandons his plan to blackmail him with Ellen's ring.

The night before his wedding, Dexter is kidnapped by King, who takes him to an abandoned factory. Dexter reveals he killed Freebo and taunts King. He manages to escape by breaking his hand, and snaps King's neck, just as the police arrive after finding evidence of King's location. He escapes the factory, dropping King's body on a passing cruiser to make it look like suicide by cop. Despite knowing about Rita's previous marriages, Dexter decides not to say anything. Dexter and Rita get married, with Dexter promising to be the best father and husband. As they dance, Dexter imagines that Harry (James Remar) and Laura (Sage Kirkpatrick) watch over him.

== Production ==
The episode was written by co-executive producer Scott Buck, and was directed by Keith Gordon. This was Buck's sixth writing credit, and Gordon's sixth directing credit.

== Reception ==
=== Viewers ===
In its original American broadcast, "Do You Take Dexter Morgan?" was seen by an estimated 1.51 million household viewers with a 0.7 in the 18–49 demographics. This means that 0.7 percent of all households with televisions watched the episode. This was a 12% increase in viewership from the previous episode, which was watched by an estimated 1.34 million household viewers with a 0.7 in the 18–49 demographics.

=== Critical reviews ===
"Do You Take Dexter Morgan?" received positive reviews from critics. Matt Fowler of IGN gave the episode a "great" 8.6 out of 10, and wrote, "This episode didn't feel all that menacing. It seemed like the true suspense might have died with Miguel. Sure, there are remaining obstacles for Dexter to overcome, but they remain internal and emotional for the most part."

Scott Tobias of The A.V. Club gave the episode an "A–" grade and wrote, "a solid end to a solid season. I have a tendency to underestimate the writers at the beginning of a season, when they're busy futzing around with Miami Metro subplots that seem to be going nowhere slow. But then, all the elements coalesce and the last few episodes gather up a lot of momentum and suspense."

Alan Sepinwall wrote, "if it hadn't been for that lovely shot of the blood dripping onto Rita's wedding dress, I think the episode would have been a total loss. As it is, I want to hope that his season was just a misstep for the Dexter creative team, but I've been worried for a while now that there's only so much life in the concept, and it feels like they've run out." Paula Paige of TV Guide wrote, "In the Season 3 finale of Dexter, what doesn't kill us makes us stronger. Secrets were exposed and kept hidden. And so many loose ends were tied up quite nicely. I started watching this episode with a mixture of both excitement and sadness knowing it'll be a long wait for the Season 4."

Debra McDuffee of TV Squad wrote, "I really liked it, and I think the growth that Dexter experienced as a person was really important for him. All along, I've posited that Dexter, though he thinks he's a deviant, is more like everyone else than he realizes: same insecurities, same fears. To see him overcome some of these and accept happiness was profound." Television Without Pity gave the episode an "B" grade.
