= Karen Campbell (disambiguation) =

Karen Campbell is a Scottish crime fiction author.

Karen Campbell may also refer to:

- Karen Campbell (swimmer), American swimmer and gold medalist in the 100m butterfly at the 1999 Pan American Games
- Karen Campbell, a character in the Scottish television series Taggart
