= Red Brick Road (unproduced TV series) =

Unproduced Warner Television TV series

- Genre: Adventure; Drama; Fantasy
- Based on: Oz book series by L. Frank Baum
- Developed by: Rob Prior
- Written by: Tim Schlattmann
- Country of origin: United States
- Original language: English

Production
- Executive producers: Tim Schlattmann; Roy Lee; Mark Wolper; Adrian Askarieh; Jeff Krelitz
- Producer: Rob Prior
- Production companies: Warner Horizon; Vertigo Entertainment; The Wolper Organization

Original release
- Network: Lifetime

Red Brick Road is an unproduced American fantasy drama television series, created by American artist Rob Prior. It would have served as a spin-off to the works based on the Land of Oz, inspired by the Red Brick Road visible in the 1939 movie The Wizard of Oz, and was originally described as a "darker", "grittier" version of Oz.

The project was eventually cancelled due to creative differences, with developer Rob Prior stating that he "did not like the way that Warner Brothers was going with the project" and felt like Warner were ignoring the art and story that he provided, fearing that they were treating it "as a bad Hallmark movie".

== Premise ==
In the classic 1939 feature, when Dorothy set off for the Emerald City, she followed the Yellow Brick Road. But among the yellow bricks at Dorothy’s feet, there was also a swirl of red bricks. They’ve been there the whole time in plain sight. Unnoticed. Unexplored. Which raises the question — just where do they go? Red Brick Road will answer that by following Dorothy down that fateful path, taking her to the oldest, darkest and most dangerous parts of Oz to find what became of her friends who all have gone missing.
