= I Had a Dream (Dexter) =

- Dexter episode
- Episode no.: Season 3 Episode 11
- Directed by: Marcos Siega
- Written by: Charles H. Eglee; Lauren Gussis
- Cinematography by: Romeo Tirone
- Editing by: Stewart Schill
- Original release date: December 7, 2008
- Running time: 51 minutes

Guest appearances
- Jimmy Smits as Miguel Prado (special guest star); Desmond Harrington as Joey Quinn; David Ramsey as Anton Briggs; Kristin Dattilo as Barbara Gianna; Jesse Borrego as George King; Jason Manuel Olazabal as Ramon Prado; Jane McLean as Tammy Okama

Episode chronology
← Previous "Go Your Own Way"	Next → "Do You Take Dexter Morgan?"
- Dexter season 3

"I Had a Dream" is the eleventh episode of the third season of the American crime drama television series Dexter. It is the 35th overall episode of the series and was written by executive producer Charles H. Eglee and co-producer Lauren Gussis, and was directed by Marcos Siega. It originally aired on Showtime on December 7, 2008.

Set in Miami, the series centers on Dexter Morgan, a forensic technician specializing in bloodstain pattern analysis for the fictional Miami Metro Police Department, who leads a secret parallel life as a vigilante serial killer, hunting down murderers who have not been adequately punished by the justice system due to corruption or legal technicalities. In the episode, Dexter tries to stop Miguel from going after LaGuerta, while Debra and Joey close in on catching George King.

According to Nielsen Media Research, the episode was seen by an estimated 1.34 million household viewers and gained a 0.7 ratings share among adults aged 18–49. The episode received critical acclaim, who praised the closure to Miguel's story arc.

== Plot ==
Kidnapped in the trunk of a car, Dexter (Michael C. Hall) believes Ramón is his kidnapper. He releases himself, and when the trunk opens, he punches the stranger. However, it is revealed to be Masuka (C. S. Lee), who took him to his bachelor party at a bar. As the party continues, Miguel (Jimmy Smits) arrives to deliver a speech as Dexter's best man.

Dexter considers killing Miguel on his wedding day, but decides that he can blame him on George King (Jesse Borrego) instead. As Debra (Jennifer Carpenter) asks him for advice while dealing with Anton (David Ramsey), Dexter reveals that Harry (James Remar) had an affair with an informant, not revealing it was Laura Moser. Debra initially refuses to believe it, but is disappointed to realize it is true. That night, Dexter watches Miguel meeting with LaGuerta (Lauren Vélez) at her house, and witnesses LaGuerta checking Miguel's car, as a similar car was seen near Ellen Wolf's house on the night of the murder. As he leaves, Miguel finds evidence that she sneaked in.

LaGuerta retrieves some hair from Miguel's car and asks Dexter to run a blood test under her name. This sends an alert to Miguel, realizing that LaGuerta continues investigating Ellen's case. The hair is identified as Ellen's, but Dexter does not want to disclose this to LaGuerta, as he wants to kill Miguel himself. However, she finds the report with Wolf's DNA, and hesitates over pursuing Miguel. Discovering that King has been using Anton's change to make phone calls, Debra and Quinn (Desmond Harrington) track him to a house, where he has been hiding out. King escapes, wounding Quinn in the process.

Dexter and Debra once again discuss Harry's affair, and Dexter uses the opportunity to ask her to be his best man at the wedding, which she accepts. Realizing that Miguel plans to kill LaGuerta, Dexter sets up a trap, tricking him into thinking he is meeting LaGuerta to reveal Ellen's murder. He sedates Miguel, and takes him to Ellen's house for the kill table. Miguel tries to get Dexter to understand him, calling himself Dexter's brother. Dexter reveals that he killed his brother, just like he killed Miguel's brother, Oscar. As Miguel angrily insults him, Dexter kills Miguel by strangling him with a wire.

== Production ==
=== Development ===
The episode was written by executive producer Charles H. Eglee and co-producer Lauren Gussis, and was directed by Marcos Siega. This was Eglee's second writing credit, Gussis' fourth writing credit, and Siega's seventh directing credit.

== Reception ==
=== Viewers ===
In its original American broadcast, "Go Your Own Way" was seen by an estimated 1.34 million household viewers with a 0.7 in the 18–49 demographics. This means that 0.7 percent of all households with televisions watched the episode. This was even in viewership with the previous episode, which was watched by an estimated 1.34 million household viewers with a 0.7 in the 18–49 demographics.

=== Critical reviews ===
"I Had a Dream" received critical acclaim. Matt Fowler of IGN gave the episode an "amazing" 9.6 out of 10, and wrote, "Dexter calls all the people, including Miguel, that he's had on his table "unchecked versions of myself." And then the kicker. He tells Miguel that he killed Oscar. Wow. Smits' face in that moment. Worth the price of admission. It's been a season coming and it was well worth it."

Amelie Gillette of The A.V. Club gave the episode an "A" grade and wrote, "Only right before he kills is Dexter able to truly reveal all of his secrets to another person, which is why when he tightened the cord around Miguel's neck and he said, "I don't get to have friends," it was both a final moment of absolute honesty between two friends, as well as the absolute end to their friendship."

Alan Sepinwall wrote, "Now, Dexter doesn't know that Miguel put the Skinner on his tail, but the Skinner was always a sideshow to the season's main story, and that's done in a fairly perfunctory fashion. (To be fair, it might have seemed brilliant and shocking if I'd been unspoiled, but I don't think so.)" Paula Paige of TV Guide wrote, "The final moment after Dexter drains the life from Miguel, the color drains from the picture and Dexter goes from flushed to gray. What a fabulous way to end the ep. It could mean that Dexter is actually deeply affected by the loss of his BFF. And I am deeply affected by the loss of Jimmy Smits who brought such a wonderful energy to the season."

Debra McDuffee of TV Squad wrote, "All I have to say about that is... whoo boy. It is rare to find a show that delivers quality episodes as consistently as Dexter does. I never come away disappointed, and I sure didn't tonight." Television Without Pity gave the episode an "A–" grade.

Marcos Siega submitted this episode for consideration for Outstanding Directing for a Drama Series at the 61st Primetime Emmy Awards.
