= Teenage Wasteland (Dexter) =

- Dexter episode
- Episode no.: Season 5 Episode 9
- Directed by: Ernest Dickerson
- Written by: Lauren Gussis
- Cinematography by: Romeo Tirone
- Editing by: David Latham
- Original release date: November 21, 2010
- Running time: 55 minutes

Guest appearances
- Julia Stiles as Lumen Pierce (special guest star); Jonny Lee Miller as Jordan Chase; Peter Weller as Stan Liddy; April Lee Hernández as Cira Manzon; Daniel Travis as Barry Kurt; Christina Robinson as Astor Bennett; Tabitha Morella as Olivia; Rick Peters as Elliot Larson

Episode chronology
← Previous "Take It!"	Next → "In the Beginning"
- Dexter season 5

"Teenage Wasteland" is the ninth episode of the fifth season of the American crime drama television series Dexter. It is the 57th overall episode of the series and was written by supervising producer Lauren Gussis, and was directed by Ernest Dickerson. It originally aired on Showtime on November 21, 2010.

Set in Miami, the series centers on Dexter Morgan, a forensic technician specializing in bloodstain pattern analysis for the fictional Miami Metro Police Department, who leads a secret parallel life as a vigilante serial killer, hunting down murderers who have not been adequately punished by the justice system due to corruption or legal technicalities. In the episode, Dexter and Lumen target Chase, while receiving visitors, while Debra seeks to re-open the Barrel Girls investigation.

According to Nielsen Media Research, the episode was seen by an estimated 2.11 million household viewers and gained a 1.0/2 ratings share among adults aged 18–49. The episode received mostly positive reviews from critics, although many were critical of the Astor storyline. For the episode, Michael C. Hall received a nomination for Outstanding Lead Actor in a Drama Series at the 63rd Primetime Emmy Awards.

== Plot ==
While alone at Rita's house, Lumen (Julia Stiles) finds someone trying to sneak into the house and calls Dexter (Michael C. Hall) for help. However, it is actually Astor (Christina Robinson), alongside her friend Olivia (Tabitha Morella), who stole alcohol. Astor is not content with Lumen staying, as she believes she is Dexter's girlfriend, and gets even more upset when Harrison says "mama" apparently to Lumen (actually to a toy, as revealed later).

LaGuerta (Lauren Vélez) publicly blames Debra (Jennifer Carpenter) for the shootout and demotes her to the file room. She finds DNA evidence in the closed Barrel Girls file indicating the involvement of multiple other perpetrators, possibly including Cole Harmon. Despite Angel (David Zayas) advocating, LaGuerta (Lauren Vélez) initially refuses to re-open the case but caves when confronted by Debra. LaGuerta reveals that she helped Dexter by suspending Quinn (Desmond Harrington), leaving Debra confused as Quinn said he was taking vacations. She confronts him, and he confesses he suspected Dexter of being Kyle Butler.

Dexter trains with Chase (Jonny Lee Miller), noticing that he has a blood vial. He retrieves some blood from the vial and leaves, but Chase realizes he took from the vial. Lumen calls to report that Astor and Olivia are missing, and when Dexter arrives, he finds signs of a possible abduction. The police quickly find and arrest the owner of a van seen near the house, Barry Kurt (Daniel Travis), who turns out to be Olivia's stepfather also searching for her. The girls are found when they are arrested for shoplifting. Dexter bails them out and all return to the house, where Dexter finally manages to connect with Astor, while Lumen discovers that Olivia is being physically abused. It is Barry. Dexter finds and beats Barry, thoroughly explaining the extreme pain that mirrors the ways Barry hurt Olivia. Threatening him with worse, Dexter tells him to dump Olivia's mother and deeply offend her in the process to prevent reconciliation.

Liddy (Peter Weller) visits Quinn to give him photographs of Dexter and Lumen dumping a body, but Quinn instead just ends their job, warning him to leave him and Debra alone. At the station, unconvinced by Quinn's repeated declaration of love, Debra breaks up with him. Dexter drives the girls back to Orlando, where Olivia reveals that Barry followed Dexter's instructions to the letter. When Astor again asks about Lumen, Dexter admits that more than just a tenant, Lumen is a friend he is helping get past trauma.

Chase calls the house looking for Dexter, but reaches Lumen (who immediately recognizes him) and taunts her by revealing that he knows who she is.

== Production ==
=== Development ===
The episode was written by supervising producer Lauren Gussis, and was directed by Ernest Dickerson. This was Gussis' seventh writing credit, and Dickerson's fourth directing credit.

== Reception ==
=== Viewers ===
In its original American broadcast, "Teenage Wasteland" was seen by an estimated 2.11 million household viewers with a 1.0/2 in the 18–49 demographics. This means that 1 percent of all households with televisions watched the episode, while 2 percent of all of those watching television at the time of the broadcast watched it. This was a 8% increase in viewership from the previous episode, which was watched by an estimated 1.94 million household viewers with a 0.9/2 in the 18–49 demographics.

=== Critical reviews ===
"Teenage Wasteland" received mostly positive reviews from critics. Matt Fowler of IGN gave the episode a "great" 8.5 out of 10, and wrote, ""Teenage Wasteland," the follow up to the outrageously good "Take It," was jam-packed with goodness. At times it felt a little overly-busy, but at the same time it managed to put a ton of things in motion. Not only did Deb learn about Quinn's suspicions that Dexter was actually the mysterious Kyle Butler, but she also got closer to picking up his trail regarding the dead barrel girls. Dammit, sometimes Deb's great detective is hella frustrating. In a good "creates suspense" kind of way, of course."

Emily St. James of The A.V. Club gave the episode a "C" grade and wrote, "Dexter has staked so much this season on forward momentum and keeping the plot churning along that it can't really afford an hour like this, especially this late in the game. In fact, ask yourself this: What's really changed from the beginning of this episode to the end of it? Even on the most superficial of levels, barely anything, and that's a problem. Sharks gotta keep moving forward."

Alan Sepinwall of HitFix wrote, "“Teenage Wasteland” felt very typical of season five as a whole: weird and kind of all over the place, but with enough redeeming features that I was mostly able to shrug off the parts that didn't work." Lizzy Goodman of Vulture wrote, "It's genuinely chilling. And it means Dexter no longer has to pretend he's just a lost manchild looking for direction, and Chase no longer has to sell the holier-than-thou, enlightened-guru act. They can both act as they are: two fractured souls in search of their complete selves."

Sandra Gonzalez of Entertainment Weekly wrote, "We always knew there would be a time this season when Jonny Lee Miller's Jordan Chase would move out of "quiet looming threat" status into a full-fledged villain. At the end of episode 9, here we are - has the color returned to anyone's knuckles yet? (Probably not.)" Billy Grifter of Den of Geek wrote, "With three stories left to run, the good ship Dexter is on a dramatic collision course with nobody at the wheel. Based on what we've seen before, I can't imagine that we've got much chance in second-guessing where this might be going for any of the main characters."

Claire Zulkey of Los Angeles Times wrote, "The most intriguing part of the episode for me was Deb meeting Lumen. Deb knows something's up, that Lumen's not just Dexter's renter, but what I ultimately want to know is where their mutual acquaintanceship will take them." Television Without Pity gave the episode an "A" grade.

=== Accolades ===
Michael C. Hall submitted this episode to support his nomination for Outstanding Lead Actor in a Drama Series at the 63rd Primetime Emmy Awards. He would lose to Kyle Chandler for Friday Night Lights.
