= Lost Boys (Dexter) =

- Dexter episode
- Episode no.: Season 4 Episode 10
- Directed by: Keith Gordon
- Written by: Charles H. Eglee; Tim Schlattmann
- Cinematography by: Romeo Tirone
- Editing by: Stewart Schill
- Original release date: November 29, 2009
- Running time: 57 minutes

Guest appearances
- John Lithgow as Arthur Mitchell (special guest star); Courtney Ford as Christine Hill; Brando Eaton as Jonah Mitchell; Mary Mara as Valerie Hodges; Jake Short as Scott Smith

Episode chronology
← Previous "Hungry Man"	Next → "Hello, Dexter Morgan"
- Dexter season 4

"Lost Boys" is the tenth episode of the fourth season of the American crime drama television series Dexter. It is the 46th overall episode of the series and was written by executive producer Charles H. Eglee and supervising producer Tim Schlattmann, and was directed by Keith Gordon. It originally aired on Showtime on November 29, 2009.

Set in Miami, the series centers on Dexter Morgan, a forensic technician specializing in bloodstain pattern analysis for the fictional Miami Metro Police Department, who leads a secret parallel life as a vigilante serial killer, hunting down murderers who have not been adequately punished by the justice system due to corruption or legal technicalities. In the episode, Dexter follows Arthur after he kidnaps a boy, while Debra suspects Christine was involved in Lundy's death.

According to Nielsen Media Research, the episode was seen by an estimated 1.80 million household viewers and gained a 0.8/2 ratings share among adults aged 18–49. The episode received critical acclaim, with critics praising the tension, writing, revelations and performances.

== Plot ==
Dexter (Michael C. Hall) has moved his kill tools to a shipping container, deciding to finally kill Arthur (John Lithgow). He follows him, realizing that Arthur is stalking a babysitter with two children to an arcade. He witnesses him kidnap the boy, Scott Smith (Jake Short), and fails to stop him. Arthur calls him, warning him to tread back or he will kill Scott.

Dexter realizes that Arthur has kidnapped children five days before committing his bathtub murders. He concludes that the children represents Arthur himself, and that he actually kills four people in each cycle. After realizing another child went missing before Lisa Bell's murder, Arthur is starting a new cycle with Scott. After visiting Scott's parents, Dexter theorizes that Arthur uses his organization to build houses, wherein the boys are buried. At an unknown location, Arthur keeps Scott locked in a small room, referring to him as Arthur. He makes him play with model trains and wear a cowboy pajama if he wants to get food.

Debra (Jennifer Carpenter) has finally agreed to have an interview with Christine (Courtney Ford), which she conducts at the interrogation room. Initially helpful, Debra questions Christine herself; she lives a full hour away from the hotel where Lundy was murdered, yet she arrived within minutes after the shooting was reported. Christine decides to leave, and Angel (David Zayas) notes that she could watch images of murders, yet she struggled to see Lundy's crime scene. Christine calls Arthur to help her, but he refuses, as he only meets her twice a year. Quinn (Desmond Harrington) is furious when Debra suggests Christine could be the shooter, but reluctantly agrees to get her toothbrush tested for DNA.

Cody (Preston Bailey) gets into a fight at school after a mate from young sailor club claims Dexter left at night. Dexter talks with Cody, who does not want to be part of the club anymore. Dexter is shaken upon seeing that now Cody covers for him, just like Arthur uses his family to cover his tracks. Scott lashes out at Arthur for his treatment, until Arthur starts crying when Vera's favorite song is heard. Scott consoles him and agrees to do what he says, and Arthur gives him a sedated ice cream. Dexter is finally able to locate the location, but arrives too late as Arthur has already taken Scott with him to another location. Masuka (C. S. Lee), who has been trying to tell Dexter about seeing Rita (Julie Benz) kissing Elliot, is shocked when the toothbrush reveals that Christine and the Trinity Killer are actually family.

Arthur is forced to meet with Christine, who admonishes him for his treatment. She has kept track of the postcards he sends, which line up with the murders he committed. She knew Lundy was getting too close to him, and slept with Quinn to get information, revealing she also killed Lundy to protect him. Arthur claims he is proud of her and agrees to meet her to solve her situation, but is actually angry. He later takes Scott to a build, ready to bury him in cement, when Dexter arrives. Dexter fights him and manages to save Scott, but Arthur flees. Debra, Angel and Quinn later take Christine into custody. Dexter arrives home, where he tends to a crying Harrison, promising no one can hurt him, not even Dexter himself.

== Production ==
=== Development ===
The episode was written by executive producer Charles H. Eglee and supervising producer Tim Schlattmann, and was directed by Keith Gordon. This was Eglee's fourth writing credit, Schlattmann's eighth writing credit, and Gordon's eighth directing credit.

== Reception ==
=== Viewers ===
In its original American broadcast, "Lost Boys" was seen by an estimated 1.80 million household viewers with a 0.8/2 in the 18–49 demographics. This means that 0.8 percent of all households with televisions watched the episode, while 2 percent of all of those watching television at the time of the broadcast watched it. This was a slight increase in viewership from the previous episode, which was watched by an estimated 1.76 million household viewers with a 0.8/2 in the 18–49 demographics.

=== Critical reviews ===
"Lost Boys" received critical acclaim. Matt Fowler of IGN gave the episode an "amazing" 9.3 out of 10, and wrote, "As much of a fan as I was of having Dexter "hide in plain sight" by having all his murder junk in the backyard shed, I suppose the lesson here is that there is no possible way to blend the worlds of family and vigilante bloodlust together. A choice needs to be made between the two. There was something substantially awesome in watching Dexter search empty house after empty house, looking for the harrowing and dark secret that is the missing boy."

Emily St. James of The A.V. Club gave the episode an "A–" grade and wrote, "The biggest problems with all of the suburban ennui and assorted plotlines come from the fact that much of this tension gets shoved to the background in favor of bumbling suburban antics. This is not to say that the show can't play Dexter's emotional growth for real pathos and heart – look at how well it's dealing with the fact that he's started to realize how deeply he feels for the kids this season. It's to say that the show gets more mileage when the serial killer has something real and vital at risk, not when it feels like a crazy fish-out-of-water programmer from the mid-80s."

Alan Sepinwall wrote, "as good as Michael C. Hall and John Lithgow have been this year, I find it harder and harder to care about what's happening on the show." Kristal Hawkins of Vulture wrote, "Trinity's patterns — and his family life — prove even more complicated than they seemed. And this episode reminds us, sadly, that our favorite serial-killer show sometimes has a hard time constructing a suspenseful plot."

Billy Grifter of Den of Geek wrote, "In tension cranking this season has left all the previous ones in the dust, and frankly, embarrassed almost all the other drama shows currently running. What worries me is that the peak is yet ahead, and I'm not sure I can handle that altitude without oxygen." Gina DiNunno of TV Guide wrote, "The body begins sinking in the cement, and Dexter knocks Trinity out cold. He manages to get the boy out just in time and finds he is still alive. He turns back, but Trinity is gone."

Danny Gallagher of TV Squad wrote, "Dexter has a very touching scene with his infant son Harrison who helps him realize just how much his family means to him, maybe enough to give up his second life as a serial killer forever. Of course, not before Arthur is 100 feet below sea level in a double wrapped garbage bag, I hope." Television Without Pity gave the episode an "A–" grade.

Courtney Ford submitted this episode for consideration for Outstanding Guest Actress in a Drama Series, while Charles H. Eglee and Tim Schlattmann submitted it for consideration for Outstanding Writing for a Drama Series, and Keith Gordon submitted it for Outstanding Directing for a Drama Series at the 62nd Primetime Emmy Awards.
