= In the Beginning (Dexter) =

- Dexter episode
- Episode no.: Season 5 Episode 10
- Directed by: Keith Gordon
- Written by: Scott Reynolds
- Cinematography by: Romeo Tirone
- Editing by: Michael Ruscio
- Original release date: November 28, 2010
- Running time: 53 minutes

Guest appearances
- Julia Stiles as Lumen Pierce (special guest star); Jonny Lee Miller as Jordan Chase; Peter Weller as Stan Liddy; Maria Doyle Kennedy as Sonya; Angela Bettis as Emily Birch; Scott Grimes as Alex Tilden; Michael Durrell as Stuart Frank; Chris Vance as Cole Harmon; Sean O'Bryan as Dan Mendell

Episode chronology
← Previous "Teenage Wasteland"	Next → "Hop a Freighter"
- Dexter season 5

"In the Beginning" is the tenth episode of the fifth season of the American crime drama television series Dexter. It is the 58th overall episode of the series and was written by Scott Reynolds, and was directed by Keith Gordon. It originally aired on Showtime on November 28, 2010.

Set in Miami, the series centers on Dexter Morgan, a forensic technician specializing in bloodstain pattern analysis for the fictional Miami Metro Police Department, who leads a secret parallel life as a vigilante serial killer, hunting down murderers who have not been adequately punished by the justice system due to corruption or legal technicalities. In the episode, Dexter and Lumen locate a survivor to get the name of the other man in the photograph, while Liddy gets closer to discover Dexter's secret.

According to Nielsen Media Research, the episode was seen by an estimated 2.54 million household viewers and gained a 1.1/3 ratings share among adults aged 18–49. The episode received acclaim by critics, who praised the performances, writing and character development. For the episode, Julia Stiles received a nomination for Outstanding Guest Actress in a Drama Series at the 63rd Primetime Emmy Awards.

== Plot ==
Dexter (Michael C. Hall) gets Sonya (Maria Doyle Kennedy) to take Harrison to Astor and Cody's grandparents' house outside Miami, afraid that Jordan Chase (Jonny Lee Miller) could go after him. He gets Lumen (Julia Stiles) to stay at his apartment, while he tracks Emily Birch, whose blood Jordan Chase wears as a trophy.

With the Barrel Girls case re-opened, Miami Metro begins investigating Chase and Harmon's whereabouts. While inspecting Harmon's house, Debra (Jennifer Carpenter) and Quinn (Desmond Harrington) find 13 numbered DVDs depicting women being raped, with Dexter deducing that Lumen is #13. To prevent her (and himself) from being discovered, Dexter steals Lumen's DVD and replaces it with one he damaged. The police identify Dan the dentist in the video's. Dexter and Lumen visit Emily (Angela Bettis), but she claims not to know Chase nor any of the other men. Dexter gives Lumen the DVD of her rape, which she watches alone.

Lumen visits Emily again and wins her trust by showing her a piece of video of Lumen's abuse. Emily finally admits that twenty years prior she was abducted and raped by a gang of campers led by Chase, whose name at the time was Eugene Greer. She also identifies the last man in the picture as Alex Tilden (Scott Grimes), and says they made her take that picture immediately following the rape. Lumen withholds Tilden's name from Dexter until he agrees to let her make the kill. Emily visits Jordan Chase, and it is revealed that he instructed her to give Tilden's name to Lumen. They have a psychosexual bond in which she does his bidding and he alternatively soothes and provokes her insecurities.

Liddy (Peter Weller) sneaks into the police station and takes equipment after forging Quinn's signature, using it to watch Dexter's apartment. Dexter and Lumen stage the killing room, unaware that Liddy is following them. Chase is also outside, monitoring his intent to use Tilden as bait and have Dexter and Lumen caught red-handed by police. Debra and Quinn arrive at Tilden's house to follow up on Chase's tip, but miss Dexter and Lumen whose kill room is in the vacant house next door. Lumen kills Tilden with no hesitation. That night, they return home after disposing of the body. Lumen lightly restrains Dexter with his own clothing, and they have sex.

== Production ==
=== Development ===
The episode was written by Scott Reynolds, and was directed by Keith Gordon. This was Reynolds' fifth writing credit, and Gordon's ninth directing credit.

== Reception ==
=== Viewers ===
In its original American broadcast, "In the Beginning" was seen by an estimated 2.54 million household viewers with a 1.1/3 in the 18–49 demographics. This means that 1.1 percent of all households with televisions watched the episode, while 3 percent of all of those watching television at the time of the broadcast watched it. This was a 20% increase in viewership from the previous episode, which was watched by an estimated 2.11 million household viewers with a 1.0/2 in the 18–49 demographics.

=== Critical reviews ===
"In the Beginning" received critical acclaim. Matt Fowler of IGN gave the episode an "amazing" 9 out of 10, and wrote, "We're all pretty sure that Lumen will be the first "guest star" on this series to survive the season, but now it seems like she's not going to just take off and head home after he killings are done. Things are looking like Lumen might somehow take the fall for the kills and get sent to prison. Like she might voluntarily sacrifice herself to save Dexter because his work is important. As she and Dexter embraced at the end, Dexter relished the fact that she was the first person to know the truth and not think of him as a monster."

Emily St. James of The A.V. Club gave the episode an "A–" grade and wrote, "So we've got all of the pieces in place for what should be two pretty terrific final episodes, even if it took some weird steps for the show to get there. More than any other season of the series, the final two episodes of this season of Dexter are going to be incredibly important in the season's overall success." Alan Sepinwall of HitFix wrote, "I guess that's a problem a show this established – and, outside of the huge exception of Rita's death, with such an established pattern of resetting the status quo – can't get around. I can't just watch these crazy events unfold, but rather keep thinking about how the show's familiar pattern will apply to all the new characters in the climax."

Lizzy Goodman of Vulture wrote, "Lumen doesn't see Dexter as a monster, she sees him as a really good man, someone who rescued her in so many ways. And through her eyes, Dexter sees himself that way. And that's what love is, right? Seeing the best version of yourself through someone else? But what about the dark side of that? What about the dark side of our love for Dexter? Bottom line: He's a murderer. Is the deservedness of his victims' deaths enough to firmly separate him from someone like Chase?" Sandra Gonzalez of Entertainment Weekly wrote, "After last week's gasp-inducing final minutes - when Jordan Chase all but declared war on Lumen and Dexter - we knew something big was going to go down this week. Little did we know that episode 10's biggest moment would be less about Dexter and Lumen's destruction and more about the pair's union - in the bedroom."

Gina DiNunno of TV Guide wrote, "In a touching moment, he kisses her forehead and she puts his hand on her heart. Later, as the two lay naked and look at each other, Dexter thinks to himself, "In her eyes, I'm not a monster."" Billy Grifter of Den of Geek wrote, "Two more episodes to go, and we're on the edge of a disturbing precipice, wondering how long the fall takes. I'm not even going to attempt to guess where we're being taken and what the consequences for all concerned might be. It's a white knuckle ride and there's no getting off now."

Claire Zulkey of Los Angeles Times wrote, "My longshot prediction is that Liddy will die in a horrible fire along with all of his notes on Dexter, but in the meantime Liddy's muddling around will indicate a huge mess for Dexter, Lumen, Quinn and Deb, and I can't wait for that." Television Without Pity gave the episode an "A" grade.

=== Accolades ===
For the episode, Julia Stiles received a nomination for Outstanding Guest Actress in a Drama Series at the 63rd Primetime Emmy Awards. She would lose to Loretta Devine for Grey's Anatomy.
