= Road Kill (Dexter) =

- Dexter episode
- Episode no.: Season 4 Episode 8
- Directed by: Ernest Dickerson
- Written by: Melissa Rosenberg; Scott Reynolds
- Cinematography by: Romeo Tirone
- Editing by: Louis Cioffi
- Original release date: November 15, 2009
- Running time: 54 minutes

Guest appearances
- John Lithgow as Arthur Mitchell (special guest star); Courtney Ford as Christine Hill; Julia Campbell as Sally Mitchell; Brando Eaton as Jonah Mitchell; Vanessa Marano as Rebecca Mitchell; Christina Robinson as Astor Bennett; Preston Bailey as Cody Bennett

Episode chronology
← Previous "Slack Tide"	Next → "Hungry Man"
- Dexter season 4

"Road Kill" is the eighth episode of the fourth season of the American crime drama television series Dexter. It is the 44th overall episode of the series and was written by executive producer Melissa Rosenberg and Scott Reynolds, and was directed by Ernest Dickerson. It originally aired on Showtime on November 15, 2009.

Set in Miami, the series centers on Dexter Morgan, a forensic technician specializing in bloodstain pattern analysis for the fictional Miami Metro Police Department, who leads a secret parallel life as a vigilante serial killer, hunting down murderers who have not been adequately punished by the justice system due to corruption or legal technicalities. In the episode, Dexter accompanies Arthur on a road trip to Tampa, while Debra tries to make her own investigation into Trinity's case.

According to Nielsen Media Research, the episode was seen by an estimated 1.70 million household viewers and gained a 0.8/2 ratings share among adults aged 18–49. The episode received positive reviews from critics, who praised Lithgow's performance in the episode. For the episode, John Lithgow won Outstanding Guest Actor in a Drama Series at the 62nd Primetime Emmy Awards.

== Plot ==
Dexter (Michael C. Hall) is still shaken after having killed Jonathan Farrow, whose innocence means he violated the Code of Harry. His assistant, Timothy Brand, has confessed to the murders and he is also a suspect when Farrow goes "missing." He checks on Arthur (John Lithgow) after the deer incident, and finds that he is leaving for Tampa to help his organization.

Debra (Jennifer Carpenter) convinces Miami Metro that Lundy's death is linked to Trinity Killer, showing evidence that he has been active for thirty years. LaGuerta (Lauren Vélez) is willing to continue the investigation, but does not want Debra involved as she was involved with Lundy. Nevertheless, Debra tries to get Quinn (Desmond Harrington) to help her, getting him to come up with the concept of mouth swabs in order to find a suspect. To get the DNA results, Quinn convinces the unit to give up one vacation day to get enough funding. Quinn is also visited by Christine (Courtney Ford), who could face losing her job if she finds nothing on the case. As he consoles her, Christine sees the reports on the mouth swab tests.

Needing an excuse to leave for Tampa, Dexter convinces LaGuerta in letting him leave for a blood spatter conference in the city. He convinces Arthur to accompany him, explaining that he feels a greater purpose with him. At a stop, Arthur asks Dexter about what his problem is, as he feels frustrated that he does not open up with him. Dexter finally admits that he killed a man, but claims it was a hunting accident. Arthur sympathizes with Dexter, feeling that confessing is part of the healing progress. Dexter, who took the hammer that Arthur gave him, plans to kill him in Tampa. However, the confession makes a change of plans for Arthur, who decides to deviate from their route.

Arthur takes Dexter to his childhood house, ignoring the Asian owner's protests to leave. Arthur then stares at the bathroom, explaining that when he was ten years old, he saw his sister Vera showering. When she saw him, she accidentally slipped and cut her leg with glass, bleeding to death. Arthur's mother committed suicide, while his father often beat him, blaming him for her death. Arthur is relieved to have told this to someone else, hoping Dexter can feel better by knowing he can change as a person. They subsequently go to a coffee shop, and Dexter uses this to get his alibi at the conference by taking pictures. Later, he stages his hotel room to kill Arthur, but he has left his hotel room.

Checking some files, Debra is shocked by a discovery. She gets Masuka (C. S. Lee) to try to calculate the distance from her gunshot. Masuka concludes that the shooter, based on Lundy's description, could not be Trinity, as the shooter was actually smaller. Seeing her progress, LaGuerta assigns Debra to lead Trinity's investigation. Dexter finds Arthur on the second floor of a build, where he drops Vera's ashes. Arthur then jumps to his death, but is stopped by Dexter. Before Dexter considers dropping him, he is aided by more people. Arthur believes Dexter was sent to save him, but Dexter believes he knew he would intervene. On their way back to Miami, they notice a police checkpoint for DNA testing. When Dexter states that it is due to the search for a serial killer, Arthur decides to take a different route.

== Production ==
=== Development ===
The episode was written by executive producer Melissa Rosenberg and Scott Reynolds, and was directed by Ernest Dickerson. This was Rosenberg's tenth writing credit, Reynolds' third writing credit, and Dickerson's second directing credit.

== Reception ==
=== Viewers ===
In its original American broadcast, "Road Kill" was seen by an estimated 1.70 million household viewers with a 0.8/2 in the 18–49 demographics. This means that 0.8 percent of all households with televisions watched the episode, while 2 percent of all of those watching television at the time of the broadcast watched it. This was a slight decrease in viewership from the previous episode, which was watched by an estimated 1.76 million household viewers with a 0.9/2 in the 18–49 demographics.

=== Critical reviews ===
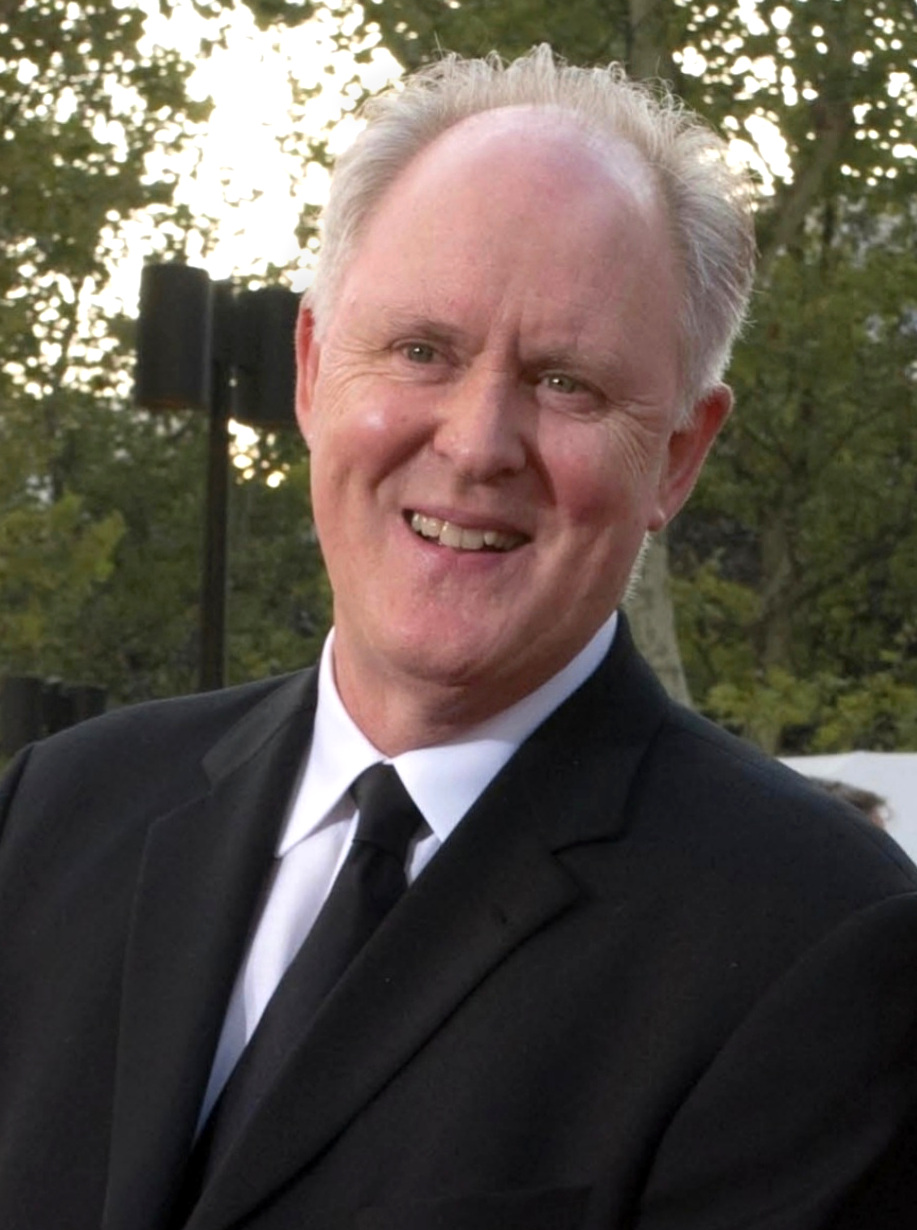
For the episode, John Lithgow won Outstanding Guest Actor in a Drama Series at the 62nd Primetime Emmy Awards.

"Road Kill" received positive reviews from critics. Matt Fowler of IGN gave the episode a "great" 8.4 out of 10, and wrote, "I'm glad, with all the theories out there about Trinity not being the shooter, that this series managed to stay a couple skips ahead of us by actually having Deb herself realize that it couldn't have been Trinity that shot her. Now it won't just be a revelation that falls flat because of all our incessant attempts to postulate. Now it's actually been written into the story as a case that will now be led by Batista."

Emily St. James of The A.V. Club gave the episode a "B–" grade and wrote, "The thought of Dexter making Dexter into something more like a human and less like a sociopath is an idea that rather makes me queasy, but the subtle coloration the show is providing is so far not so overt that I think it's created a situation where it's going to corner itself. But it's coming damn close to painting itself into that corner, and I'm not sure there's an exit strategy." Kristal Hawkins of Vulture wrote, "Dexter's misguided murder of the pervy photographer isn't tearing his life up like we'd expected (yet); instead, Trinity is cracking up, ready for another round of killing. It's a delicious and plot-furthering episode as Debra finds out something important about her killer and Trinity explains the roots of his crimes."

Billy Grifter of Den of Geek wrote, "In some respects, a better title for this story might have been ‘Slack Tide’, because I think we’re on the edge of a major change of direction, as the parts carefully constructed so far start to fall into place." Gina DiNunno of TV Guide wrote, "Dexter begins to think to himself about what Trinity said about remorse and how that separates humans from the animals. And then, for a split second, Dexter takes some solace in thought that he may be human after all."

Danny Gallagher of TV Squad wrote, "We've been sitting through weeks of boring and dry subplots about secret affairs and office romances that we couldn't care less about if we were actually one of their co-workers. But now we've been rewarded for our patience with some seedy and very interesting details about Dexter's main prey, the Trinity Killer, a man held in a very weak cage of despair and anger." Television Without Pity gave the episode a "B–" grade.

=== Accolades ===
John Lithgow submitted this episode for consideration for Outstanding Guest Actor in a Drama Series at the 62nd Primetime Emmy Awards. He would win the award, becoming the first acting win for the series.
