= Hungry Man (Dexter) =

- Dexter episode
- Episode no.: Season 4 Episode 9
- Directed by: John Dahl
- Written by: Wendy West
- Cinematography by: Romeo Tirone
- Editing by: Matthew V. Colonna
- Original release date: November 22, 2009
- Running time: 51 minutes

Guest appearances
- John Lithgow as Arthur Mitchell (special guest star); Courtney Ford as Christine Hill; Julia Campbell as Sally Mitchell; Brando Eaton as Jonah Mitchell; Vanessa Marano as Rebecca Mitchell

Episode chronology
← Previous "Road Kill"	Next → "Lost Boys"
- Dexter season 4

"Hungry Man" is the ninth episode of the fourth season of the American crime drama television series Dexter. It is the 45th overall episode of the series and was written by supervising producer Wendy West, and was directed by John Dahl. It originally aired on Showtime on November 22, 2009.

Set in Miami, the series centers on Dexter Morgan, a forensic technician specializing in bloodstain pattern analysis for the fictional Miami Metro Police Department, who leads a secret parallel life as a vigilante serial killer, hunting down murderers who have not been adequately punished by the justice system due to corruption or legal technicalities. In the episode, Dexter dines with Arthur's family, which soon escalates into a harsh conflict.

According to Nielsen Media Research, the episode was seen by an estimated 1.76 million household viewers and gained a 0.8/2 ratings share among adults aged 18–49. The episode received critical acclaim, who praised the tension, scenes at the Mitchell household and ending.

== Plot ==
Dexter (Michael C. Hall) watches over the Mitchell household. He witnesses Arthur (John Lithgow) arguing with Jonah (Brando Eaton) and breaking his trophies. Angered, Jonah takes Arthur's car and smashes it with a baseball bat. Jonah admits his father is abusive, and that he would've preferred that Dexter kill him. To help ease tensions, Dexter agrees to visit the family the following day for Thanksgiving.

Due to the DNA testing, many criminals are brought to the station. One of these is Lloyd Paulson, a man who killed a woman ten years prior. Angel (David Zayas) is content for finally solving the case, but still decides to visit the woman's widower to tell him the news. The widower is now in a comatose state, and Angel laments not catching the killer sooner. Debra (Jennifer Carpenter) plans to stay at the station to investigate, but decides to join Rita (Julie Benz) for the Thanksgiving dinner after being pressured by Dexter. Debra also gets Masuka (C. S. Lee) to accompany him, while Rita also gets Elliot (Rick Peters) to help her.

To protect Jonah, Dexter convinces the Mitchells in letting him stay for Thanksgiving, claiming he is alone. He notes that Arthur is cold towards Sally (Julia Campbell) and specifically forbids Rebecca (Vanessa Marano) from leaving her room. Jonah returns with the car, claiming it was an accident. Arthur appears forgiving and gets Dexter and Jonah to watch football with him. Dexter leaves the room to inspect the house, seeing that Arthur locks Rebecca's bedroom. When he questions Rebecca, she is willing to kiss him if she helps her escape, which he refuses. During this, Arthur takes Jonah's hand and breaks one of his fingers.

Elliot flirts with Rita during their visit, and also opens Dexter's shed when Cody (Preston Bailey) falls through the roof. He kisses her, which she responds back. However, she regrets it, even though she agrees with Elliot in that Dexter is rarely with her. This is witnessed by Masuka, who almost leaves the dinner, but agrees to stay when Debra insists. The Mitchells start their dinner, where each declares something to be thankful for. Arthur complains that no one said they were thankful for him, causing Jonah to insult him. Arthur in turn insults Sally and refers to Rebecca as "Vera". Having had enough, Jonah calls out Arthur for ruining their lives and shatters items through the house, including his sister Vera's urn. This causes Arthur to strangle him, until Dexter angrily takes him to the kitchen. He reveals his true personality when he says he should've killed him already, but is stopped when Sally and Rebecca intervene, forcing him to leave.

On his way back home, Dexter has a conversation with Harry (James Remar) over Arthur's abuse, claiming he is nothing like him. He arrives at the house, where he is confused by Rita's welcome. He checks his shed, and is relieved that his tools and slides were not discovered. While talking with Cody, Debra has an epiphany and calls Quinn (Desmond Harrington) for a new discovery; Christine (Courtney Ford) somehow knew she saw Lundy die, which is something they never divulged. That night, Christine bids farewell to Quinn after their Thanksgiving dinner at her apartment. Shortly after he leaves, someone knocks at the door. When she opens it, it is revealed to be Arthur. Christine simply says, "hi, Dad."

== Production ==
=== Development ===
The episode was written by supervising producer Wendy West, and was directed by John Dahl. This was West's second writing credit, and Dahl's fourth directing credit.

== Reception ==
=== Viewers ===
In its original American broadcast, "Hungry Man" was seen by an estimated 1.76 million household viewers with a 0.8/2 in the 18–49 demographics. This means that 0.8 percent of all households with televisions watched the episode, while 2 percent of all of those watching television at the time of the broadcast watched it. This was a slight increase in viewership from the previous episode, which was watched by an estimated 1.70 million household viewers with a 0.8/2 in the 18–49 demographics.

=== Critical reviews ===
"Hungry Man" received critical acclaim. Matt Fowler of IGN gave the episode a perfect "masterpiece" 10 out of 10, and wrote, "It was fascinating to watch Arthur's family and how each of them have been horribly scarred their own way by his monstrous mania. Here, all along, we thought that he was the perfect husband when really he's been a foul creature that's been torturing his family for years – keeping them in a perpetual state of torment. It might feel like the show's flipped around a bit, or that things might have been presented in a misleading manner for us, but you have to remember that most of Dexter is presented to us through the eyes of Dexter."

Emily St. James of The A.V. Club gave the episode a "B+" grade and wrote, "when Dexter launched himself across the room to drag Arthur off of his son (with his belt!) and haul him forcibly into the kitchen to threaten him with a knife and pretty much expose himself as someone who was going to kill Arthur, it was one of the best moments of the season. Season four has felt like the tension has sapped out of it fairly frequently, but the show can still bring that tension back at a moment's notice."

Alan Sepinwall wrote, "All I have to say is that the Lithgow/Hall portions of the episode were very strong this week, but most of the other stuff – particularly the final scene – was as silly and/or boring as usual." Kristal Hawkins of Vulture wrote, "Never has an episode of Dexter inspired this much cringing and jaw-dropping. As our favorite serial killer mulls over his copy of Anna Karenina ("All happy families resemble one another, each unhappy family is unhappy in its own way"), Thanksgiving robs him of his role model."

Billy Grifter of Den of Geek wrote, "After watching this I actually needed a stiff drink and, frankly, a few tranquilisers might have also helped. I thought that with the Miguel plotline in season three they'd moved Dexter up to a new level, but the Arthur Mitchell story has now eclipsed even that." Gina DiNunno of TV Guide wrote, "Quinn leaves Christina's apartment, much to her chagrin. As she turns to walk away, she hears a knock at the door. Is it Quinn? No. Is it Deb? No. Why, it's a very angry-looking Trinity. "Hi, Dad," Christina says to him. Wow, definitely didn't see that one coming."

Danny Gallagher of TV Squad wrote, "Now that Dexter has shown Arthur his dark side, just how is he going to get at him and how will he protect himself from Arthur, a seasoned killer who may be unstable but has been doing this a lot longer than our hero? Say what you will about Dexter not being as good as time goes by, but it can still bring home a good mystery." Television Without Pity gave the episode an "A–" grade.

Wendy West submitted this episode for consideration for Outstanding Writing for a Drama Series, while John Dahl submitted it for Outstanding Directing for a Drama Series at the 62nd Primetime Emmy Awards.
