= Go Your Own Way (Dexter) =

- Dexter episode
- Episode no.: Season 3 Episode 10
- Directed by: John Dahl
- Written by: Tim Schlattmann
- Cinematography by: Romeo Tirone
- Editing by: Louis Cioffi
- Original release date: November 23, 2008
- Running time: 50 minutes

Guest appearances
- Jimmy Smits as Miguel Prado (special guest star); Desmond Harrington as Joey Quinn; David Ramsey as Anton Briggs; Valerie Cruz as Sylvia Prado; Kristin Dattilo as Barbara Gianna; Jesse Borrego as George King; Jane McLean as Tammy Okama

Episode chronology
← Previous "About Last Night"	Next → "I Had a Dream"
- Dexter season 3

"Go Your Own Way" is the tenth episode of the third season of the American crime drama television series Dexter. It is the 34th overall episode of the series and was written by producer Tim Schlattmann, and was directed by John Dahl. It originally aired on Showtime on November 30, 2008.

Set in Miami, the series centers on Dexter Morgan, a forensic technician specializing in bloodstain pattern analysis for the fictional Miami Metro Police Department, who leads a secret parallel life as a vigilante serial killer, hunting down murderers who have not been adequately punished by the justice system due to corruption or legal technicalities. In the episode, Dexter tries to gain an upper hand on Miguel, while Debra faces problems when her relationship with Anton can ruin the case.

According to Nielsen Media Research, the episode was seen by an estimated 1.34 million household viewers and gained a 0.7 ratings share among adults aged 18–49. The episode received critical acclaim, with critics praising the rooftop confrontation scene. For the episode, Jimmy Smits received a nomination for Outstanding Guest Actor in a Drama Series at the 61st Primetime Emmy Awards.

== Plot ==
Dexter (Michael C. Hall) and Rita (Julie Benz) continue hanging out with Miguel (Jimmy Smits) and Sylvia (Valerie Cruz), with Dexter secretly aware of Miguel's manipulation. He suggests to Rita that Miguel might have an affair with LaGuerta (Lauren Vélez), hoping it can stall him.

Debra (Jennifer Carpenter) lets Anton (David Ramsey) stay with her, but is forced to get him out as she fears his presence might hurt her case, as he is a key witness. Quinn (Desmond Harrington) is upset when he learns about it, warning Debra that it could cost her detective rank. A bartender, Toby Edwards, is named as the prime suspect of Ellen Wolf's murder, and Ellen's ring is noted to be missing. Dexter visits Miguel at his office, where he makes it clear they will part ways after the wedding, not wanting to be associated with Miguel anymore. Barbara (Kristin Dattilo) is attacked by a stranger, and an angered Angel (David Zayas) asks Dexter to run a blood test on her keys to find the culprit. When he receives the results, he arrests the attacker.

As Edwards is dismissed as a suspect due to his alibi, LaGuerta reprimands Dexter for running the blood test without a case tag. Dexter realizes that Miguel is now manipulating LaGuerta in order to control the investigation, and interrupts one of their encounters. When Rita confides this information to Sylvia, she drives to LaGuerta's house, and sees them together. Despite Miguel's protests, she declares they are done as a couple. The next day, Miguel warns Dexter to back off, threatening to launch an ethics investigation into Debra's relationship with Anton. Dexter sneaks into his house, and discovers that he kept Ellen's ring, and takes it, along with Miguel's shirt stained supposedly by Freebo's blood to a laundry shop.

Anton confronts Quinn over his informant status, and punches him upon learning that he was responsible for not officially name as an informant. At the department, Miguel brings Dexter to the rooftop, to confront him over the ring and the shirt. Miguel threatens to use all his influence to get warrants for Dexter's apartment and boat, as he knows about his previous victims. Dexter is not intimidated, and simply leaves. Miguel then contacts George King (Jesse Borrego), who is watching the meeting from afar, telling him that Dexter knows Freebo's location. That night, Dexter decides that he must kill Miguel, only to be taken by a person outside his apartment. The person throws him in a trunk, and it drives off.

== Production ==
=== Development ===
The episode was written by producer Tim Schlattmann, and was directed by John Dahl. This was Schlattmann's sixth writing credit, and Dahl's second directing credit.

== Reception ==
=== Viewers ===
In its original American broadcast, "Go Your Own Way" was seen by an estimated 1.34 million household viewers with a 0.7 in the 18–49 demographics. This means that 0.7 percent of all households with televisions watched the episode. This was a 18% increase in viewership from the previous episode, which was watched by an estimated 1.13 million household viewers with a 0.6 in the 18–49 demographics.

=== Critical reviews ===
"Go Your Own Way" received critical acclaim. Matt Fowler of IGN gave the episode an "amazing" 9.5 out of 10, and wrote, "Things sometimes fall neatly into place in the Dexter-verse, but it rarely feels unwarranted or wrong. But it all has to fit in place for now so that we can focus on the war brewing between two sociopaths. One: our silent and dutiful narrator/hero – and the other: a tragically unhinged public servant out to serve no one but himself."

Scott Tobias of The A.V. Club gave the episode an "A–" grade and wrote, "Season Three has been slow to materialize, and more swamped than usual by some lame B-plots, but as Anon notes in the comments, “the third-act shift” really kicks the show into high gear. Tonight's cat-and-mouse game between Dexter and Miguel was magnificently plotted and suspenseful as hell, showcasing two strong personalities (and two strong actors) who are supremely confident in their ability to gain leverage over the other." Jeffrey Bloomer of Paste wrote, "With two more years guaranteed on the way, our hope is that Dexter finds more sure footing in the next several episodes, not to mention the sense that the progression of this story is headed somewhere real in the future."

Alan Sepinwall wrote, "Overall, I'm still underwhelmed by a lot of this season, but these last few episodes have been really strong. Dexter and Prado's cat and mouse game is the obvious highlight - their pretense-abandoning argument on the rooftop was one of the show's funniest, most electric scenes to date - but at last some of the less interesting subplots are getting tied into the main action." Paula Paige of TV Guide wrote, "The differences in the tennis match? Miguel depends on power and manipulation, while, our hero Dexter relies on his Harry-given skill. He finally admits that Harry was right."

Debra McDuffee of TV Squad wrote, "So much is going to happen in the last two episodes of Dexter, and this episode set it all up. It was a tense one, and I enjoyed watching Dexter's and Miguel's little game of cat and mouse." Television Without Pity gave the episode an "A" grade.

Jimmy Smits received a nomination for Outstanding Guest Actor in a Drama Series, while John Dahl submitted this episode for consideration for Outstanding Directing for a Drama Series at the 61st Primetime Emmy Awards. Smits would lose to Michael J. Fox for Rescue Me.
