= Kevin Maynard =

Kevin R. Maynard
- Occupation: Television writer

Kevin R. Maynard is a television writer. He has written for the Showtime series Dexter. Maynard was nominated for a Writers Guild of America Award for best dramatic series at the February 2008 ceremony for his work on the first season of Dexter. He is married to Krista Vernoff, the head writer for Grey's Anatomy.
