= Karen Campbell =

Scottish writer

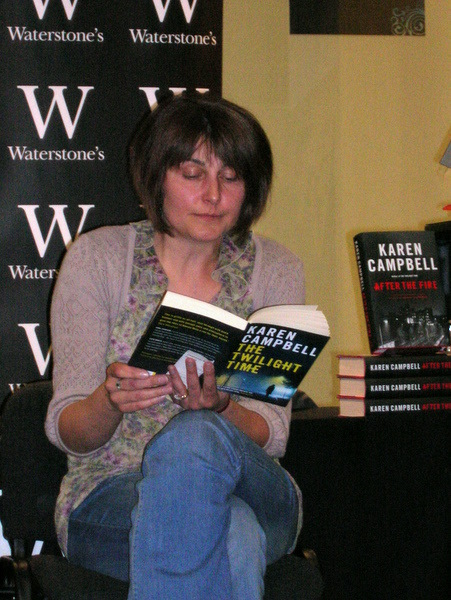
- Born: 1967 (age 58–59); Paisley, Scotland
- Occupation: Novelist
- Writing career
- Genre: Fiction
- Website: www.karencampbell.co.uk

Karen Campbell (born 1967, Paisley, Scotland) is a Scottish writer of contemporary fiction. She has written eight novels. In 2025 she was shortlisted for Scotland's National Book Awards Fiction Book of the Year.

== Background ==
Karen Campbell was born in Paisley and brought up in Glasgow. Both her mother and father worked in City of Glasgow Police, and following a degree at Glasgow University, she also joined the police, where she met her husband.

Karen studied for the Creative Writing master's degree at Glasgow University. She is a vegetarian and lives in Galloway with her husband and two daughters.

== Writing career ==
Campbell's first four novels, while billed as police procedurals, form a quartet set in Glasgow which goes behind the uniform, to examine the lives of the police officers. Key characters include Sgt. Anna Cameron and Cath and Jamie Worth.

Her fifth novel, This is Where I Am, published in 2013, breaks away from the world of the police. It tells the story of Abdi, a Somali asylum-seeker newly arrived in Glasgow with his young daughter, and of recently widowed Deborah, who has been assigned as mentor to help them settle in. The novel was selected as the BBC Radio Four Book at Bedtime in April 2013.

Now published by Canongate, Campbell published Paper Cup, which follows the journey of homeless woman Kelly, in 2022. In 2025, This Bright Life was shortlisted for the Scotland's National Book Awards Fiction Book of the Year.

== Bibliography ==
- The Twilight Time (2008)
- After The Fire (2009)
- Shadowplay (2010)
- Proof of Life (2011)
- This is Where I Am (2013)
- Rise (2015)
- The Sound of the Hours (2019)
- Paper Cup (2022)
- This Bright Life (2025)
