= Wendy West =

American television producer and writer

- Occupation: Television Writer
- Writing career
- Notable work: Dexter

Wendy West is an American television producer and writer. She worked on the Showtime drama Dexter as a writer and producer, and been nominated multiple times for Primetime Emmy Awards and two Writers Guild of America (WGA) Awards for her work.

== Biography ==
West graduated from Carleton College. While there, she was active in theater and directed John Guare's "Six Degrees of Separation."

West began working in television for the first season of Law & Order: Special Victims Unit. She also worked as a co-producer and writer for Gideon's Crossing and The Practice.

She gained a further production role as a supervising producer and writer for The Closer.

She became a supervising producer and writer for the fourth season of the Showtime drama Dexter in autumn 2009 and was nominated for the Writers Guild of America (WGA) Award for Best Drama Series at the February 2010 ceremony for that work. She was promoted to co-executive producer for the fifth season in 2010 and continued to write episodes.

== Filmography ==
| Year | Title | Credit | Role | Notes |
|---|---|---|---|---|
| 2019 | ‘’Proven Innocent’’ | Writer | 1 episode | |
| 2017 | Ultraviolet (2017) | Writer, executive producer, Created | 1 Episode | |
| 2013- | The Blacklist | Writer and Co-Executive Producer (2014) | | |
| 2013 | The Writers' Room | | Herself | Dexter (#1.3) |
| 2011 | Five | Writer | | TV movie; Segment: "Mia" |
| 2009-2013 | Dexter | Executive producer (2012–2013); Co-Executive Producer (2010–2011); Writer (2009–2013); Supervising Producer (2009) | | 57 episodes Nominated - Primetime Emmy Award for Outstanding Drama Series (2010–2011); Nominated - Writers Guild of America Award for Television: Dramatic Series (2010–2012) |
| 2009 | The Beast | Writer & Supervising Producer | | 12 episodes |
| 2008 | R.P.M. | Writer | | Various episodes |
| 2007-2008 | K-Ville | Supervising Producer (2007–2008); Writer (2007) | | 10 episodes |
| 2005-2006 | The Closer | Co-Executive Producer (2006); Supervising Producer (2005); Writer (2005–2006) | | 27 episodes |
| 2005 | Numb3rs | Writer | | Identity Crisis (#1.8) |
| 2004 | Hawaii | Producer | | Various episodes |
| 2003-2004 | Line of Fire | Writer (2004); Producer | | Various episodes |
| 2002 | For the People | Writer | | Various episodes |
| 2001 | The Practice | Story by | | Gideon's Crossover (#5.16) |
| 2000 | Gideon's Crossing | Writer & Co-producer | | Various episodes |
| 1999-2001 | Law & Order: Special Victims Unit | Co-producer (2000–2001); Writer (1999–2001); Story editor (1999–2000) | | 25 episodes |
