= Scott Reynolds (writer) =

American screenwriter

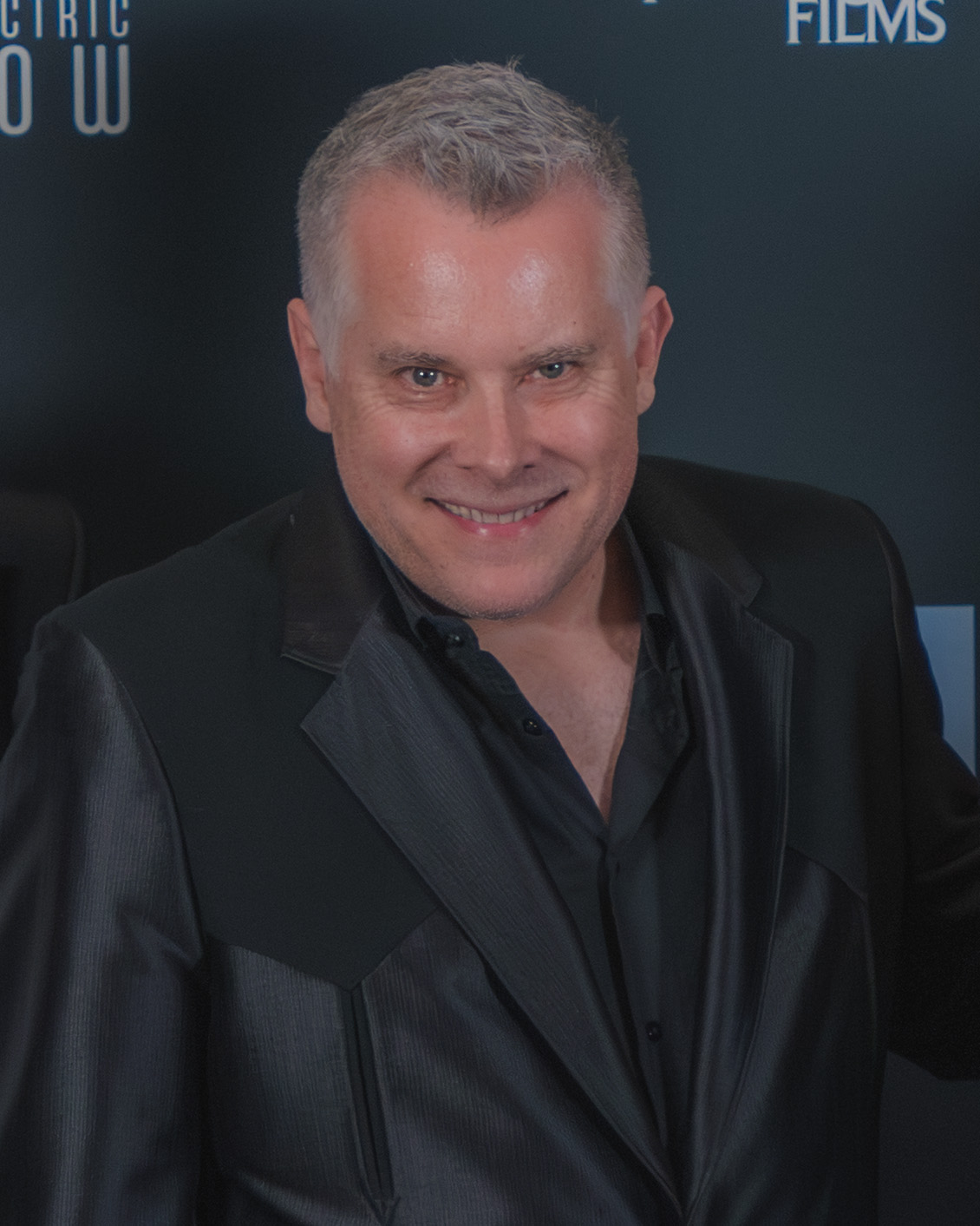
- Reynolds in 2026
- Occupation: Television writer

Scott Reynolds is a television writer. He has written for the Showtime series Dexter and the Bruckheimer television series E-Ring. He has also created/written the comic book UTF (Undead Task Force) with Tone Rodriguez for APE comics.

== Career ==
Reynolds worked as a freelance writer on the second season of Dexter in 2007. In 2008 he was given a staff writer position for the third season. Reynolds was nominated for a Writers Guild of America Award for best dramatic series at the February 2009 ceremony for his work on the third season. He was promoted to story editor for the fourth season in 2009. He was nominated for the award a second time at the February 2010 ceremony for his work on the fourth season. He was promoted again to executive story editor for the fifth season in 2010.

He has worked on the Marvel and Netflix television series' Jessica Jones (as co-showrunner for the third season) and Iron Fist and Marvel's Inhumans as a writer and executive producer.
