= Scott Buck =

American television writer

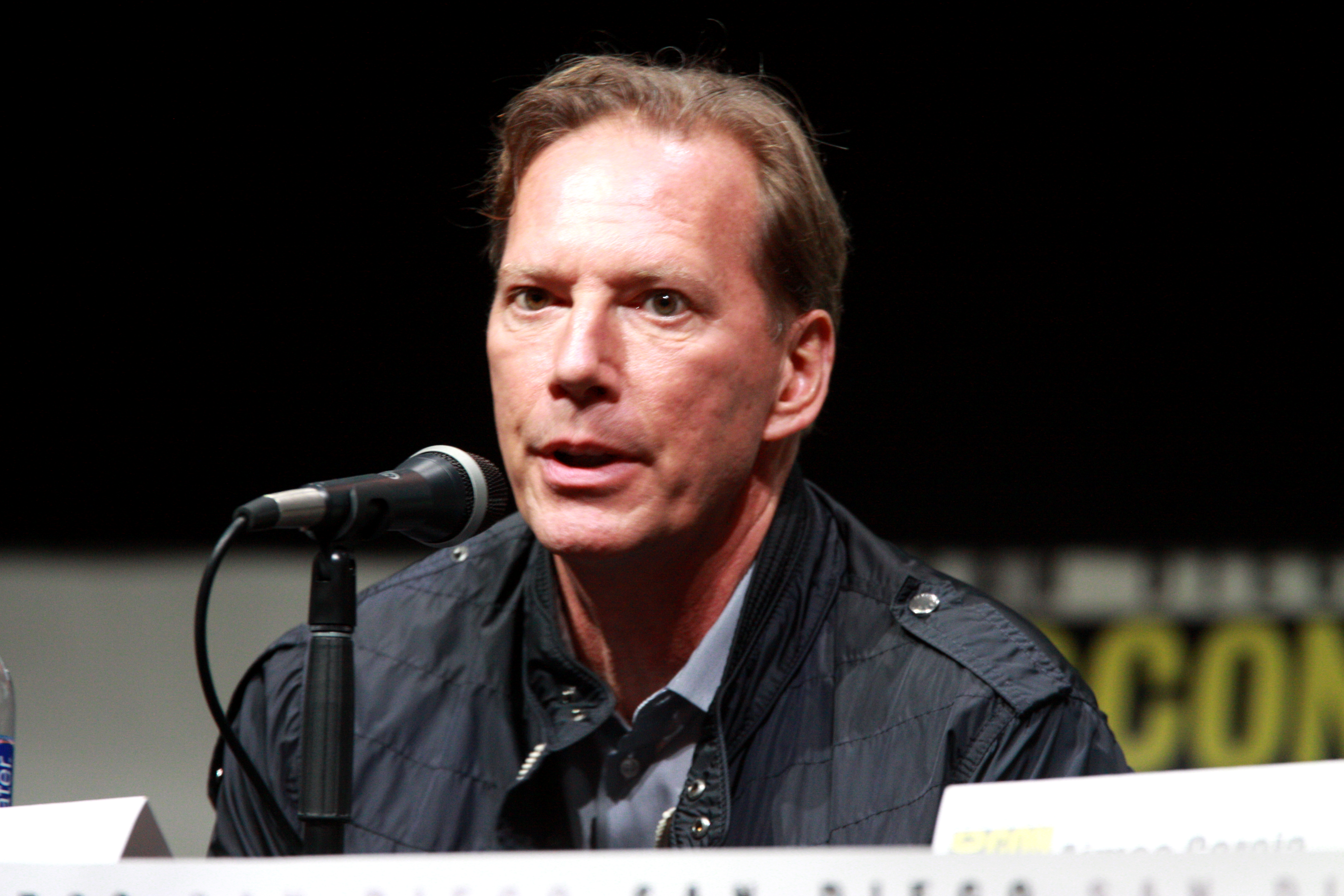
- Buck at the 2013 San Diego Comic-Con
- Born: Scott Randall Buck
- Occupations: Writer and producer

Scott Randall Buck is an American television writer. Buck has written for several television series including Six Feet Under, Rome, Showtime's Dexter, Everybody Loves Raymond, Coach, Inhumans, The Oblongs and Iron Fist.

== Career ==
Buck began his career as a sitcom writer. He joined the staff of HBO's Six Feet Under as a writer and supervising producer in 2002 for the show's second season. He wrote the second season episode "It's the Most Wonderful Time of the Year". He remained a supervising producer for the third season in 2003 and wrote two further episodes "You Never Know" and "Everyone Leaves". He was promoted to co-executive producer for the fourth season in 2004. He wrote two more episodes "That's My Dog" and "Bomb Shelter". He was nominated for both an individual WGA award, as well as WGA awards for Best Writing Staff. He received a Peabody Award for his work on Six Feet Under. He remained a co-executive producer for the fifth and final season in 2005 and contributed two more episodes – "Dancing for Me" and "Singing For Our Lives". He contributed seven episodes to the series in total.

Buck worked as a co-executive producer on the second season of HBO's Rome in 2007. He wrote two episodes for the series ("These Being the Words of Marcus Tullius Cicero" and "Death Mask") before it was canceled.

He moved on to work as a co-executive producer and writer on the second season of Showtime's Dexter later in 2007, remaining as a co-executive producer for the third season in 2008, and an executive producer for the fourth season in 2009. In 2008, 2009 and 2010, Dexter was nominated for a Writers Guild of America Award for Best Dramatic Series (with the writing team including Buck credited on the nomination) but lost to The Wire and Mad Men. Buck was promoted to showrunner in season six of Dexter, and served in that role for the show's last three seasons.

In December 2015, Buck was hired to serve as showrunner and executive producer for the Marvel and Netflix television series Iron Fist. In December 2016, Buck was named showrunner and executive producer for the Marvel, IMAX Corporation, and ABC television series Inhumans. Inhumans premiered in September 2017, and ran for one season of a planned three before cancellation. Both Iron Fist and Inhumans, as well as the final season of Dexter, received overwhelmingly negative reviews.

In 2025, He wrote episode 2 of Season 1, and in 2026 he wrote Season 2, episode 2 for Dexter: Resurrection.
