= Lauren Gussis =

American television writer and producer

Lauren Gussis is an American television writer and producer, known for the Showtime series Dexter, the NBC series E-Ring and the Netflix Original Series Insatiable (2018). She has been nominated for two Primetime Emmy Awards.

== Early life ==
Gussis grew up in Chicago, Illinois during the 1990s.

== Career ==
Gussis joined the crew of Showtime drama series Dexter as a staff writer for the first season in 2006. Gussis was nominated for a Writers Guild of America Award for best dramatic series at the February 2008 ceremony for her work on the first season of Dexter. She was promoted to story editor for the second season in 2007 and continued to script episodes. She joined the productions staff as a co-producer for the third season in 2008. She was again nominated for the WGA award at the February 2009 ceremony for her work on the third season of Dexter. She was promoted again to producer for the fourth season in 2009. She was nominated for the WGA award a third consecutive time at the February 2010 ceremony for her work on the fourth season. She was promoted again to supervising producer for the fifth season in 2010.

Insatiable debuted in August 2018 on Netflix and ran until it was cancelled in October 2019. Its rating on Rotten Tomatoes for the first season is 12%, with reviewers from Roxane Gay in Refinery29 ("The writers of Insatiable have never met a stereotype they don't love, whether they're portraying fatness or queerness or Blackness or pretty much anything else.") to Jen Chaney for Vulture ("Well, I've seen all twelve -- twelve, I tell you, twelve! -- episodes of Insatiable, and it turns out the show is not as bad as you imagined. It's actually worse. Like, worse in ways that you can't even anticipate.") excoriating the show and its take on most of the issues it treated. More than 235 thousand people signed a Change.org petition asking that the show be cancelled.
