= Tim Schlattmann =

American screenwriter

- Born: Nebraska, U.S.
- Occupation: Television writer

Timothy Schlattmann is a three-time Emmy award nominee television writer and producer. Nebraska born and raised, this former disc jockey and college professor's writing credits include ABC's number one hit Roseanne, Fox's Get Real, the WB's Smallville, the feature XCU: Extreme Close-Up, and the critically acclaimed Dexter for Showtime. As an Executive Producer since 2012, Tim Schlattmann completed the eighth and final season of Dexter and authored "Dexter Early Cuts: Dark Echo", an ongoing web series for Showtime. He has served as an Executive Producer on CBS's "Under The Dome".

== Dexter ==
Schlattman joined the crew of the Showtime drama series Dexter as a story editor for the first season in 2006. Schlattman was nominated for a Writers Guild of America Award for best dramatic series at the February 2008 ceremony for his work on the first season of Dexter. He was promoted to executive story editor and remained a writer for the second season in 2007. He was again nominated for the WGA award at the February 2009 ceremony for his work on the third season of Dexter. That same year, Dexter was also nominated for an Emmy and Golden Globe in the best dramatic series category and received the prestigious Peabody Award. He joined the production staff as a producer for the third season in 2008. In 2008, the Dexter writing staff was once again nominated in the best dramatic series category by the Writers Guild of America and the show was again nominated for an Emmy for best dramatic series, earning Tim his first Emmy nomination as a producer. He continued to script episodes.

He was promoted again to supervising producer for the fourth season in 2009. He was nominated for the WGA award a third successive time for his work on the fourth season of Dexter. He was promoted again to co-executive producer for the fifth season in 2010.
