= Romeo Tirone =

American cinematographer and television director

- Occupation(s): Cinematographer, television director
- Years active: 1996–present

Romeo Tirone is an American cinematographer and television director. He is best known for his work on the television series Dexter, for which he was nominated for a Primetime Emmy Award for Outstanding Cinematography for a One-Hour Series in 2008 for the episode "The British Invasion".

== Credits ==
=== Cinematography ===
- Lowball (1996)
- Zoe Loses It (short film) (2000)
- L.I.E. (2001)
- Date Squad (short film) (2001)
- Nadine in Date Land (TV film) (2005)
- 12 and Holding (2005)
- Cry_Wolf (2005)
- Babylon Fields (unsold TV pilot) (2007)
- Possible Side Effects (unsold TV pilot) (2009)
- Dexter (2007–2011)
- True Blood (2009–2013)

=== Television directing ===
- Dexter (2006–2013)
- True Blood (2011–2013)
- Red Widow (2013)
- Nurse Jackie (2013)
- Rectify (2013)
- Once Upon a Time in Wonderland (2013)
- Sleepy Hollow (2014)
- Revenge (2014)
- Mind Games (2014)
- Constantine (2014–2015)
- Once Upon a Time (2014–2016)
- Of Kings and Prophets (2016)
- Underground (2016)
- Blindspot (2016)
- Taken (2017–2018)
- S.W.A.T. (2018)
- Whiskey Cavalier (2019)
- The Tick (2019)
- The InBetween (2019)
- Manifest (2020–2023)
- Paradise Lost (2020)
- FBI: Most Wanted (2021)
- The Cleaning Lady (2025)
