= Take It! =

- Dexter episode
- Episode no.: Season 5 Episode 8
- Directed by: Romeo Tirone
- Written by: Manny Coto; Wendy West
- Cinematography by: Martin J. Layton
- Editing by: Louis Cioffi
- Original release date: November 14, 2010
- Running time: 52 minutes

Guest appearances
- Julia Stiles as Lumen Pierce (special guest star); Jonny Lee Miller as Jordan Chase; Peter Weller as Stan Liddy; April Lee Hernández as Cira Manzon; Chris Vance as Cole Harmon; David Paetkau as Owen; Liza Colón-Zayas as Paloma Aragon

Episode chronology
← Previous "Circle Us"	Next → "Teenage Wasteland"
- Dexter season 5

"Take It!" is the eighth episode of the fifth season of the American crime drama television series Dexter. It is the 56th overall episode of the series and was written by executive producer Manny Coto and co-executive producer Wendy West, and was directed by Romeo Tirone. It originally aired on Showtime on November 14, 2010.

Set in Miami, the series centers on Dexter Morgan, a forensic technician specializing in bloodstain pattern analysis for the fictional Miami Metro Police Department, who leads a secret parallel life as a vigilante serial killer, hunting down murderers who have not been adequately punished by the justice system due to corruption or legal technicalities. In the episode, Dexter and Lumen target Jordan Chase's security guard, while Debra realizes LaGuerta is setting her up.

According to Nielsen Media Research, the episode was seen by an estimated 1.94 million household viewers and gained a 0.9/2 ratings share among adults aged 18–49. The episode received critical acclaim, who praised the performances, character development and ending.

== Plot ==
To get close to Cole Harmon (Chris Vance), Dexter (Michael C. Hall) attends Jordan Chase's self-help seminar. Afterwards, Dexter is brought to Chase's suite, who believes he attended his seminar to deal with Rita's death. Dexter plays along, and agrees to attend another seminar.

Miami Metro finds itself involved in a PR nightmare after the Club Mayan shooting, with LaGuerta (Lauren Vélez) trying to deflect any bad press. She tells Debra (Jennifer Carpenter) that she plans to place the blame on Cira (April Lee Hernández), angering her. Debra is also forced to attend therapy sessions after killing Carlos Fuentes, despite claiming she does not feel any remorse. Later, Debra is shocked when LaGuerta gives a statement where she claims Debra was in charge of the operation, getting her suspended. Cira is revealed to have backed up LaGuerta's statement to get a promotion, but Angel (David Zayas) tells Debra he will always support her version.

As Dexter prepares to kill Harmon, Lumen (Julia Stiles) is contacted by Owen (David Paetkau), her ex-fiancé whom she left on her wedding day. He wants to meet with her, and she reluctantly accepts. Later, as she retrieves Dexter's tools, she is stalked by Liddy (Peter Weller). He gets her to accidentally hit his car, exchanging insurance information. She surprises Dexter by showing up at the hotel, and helps him set up the killing room. However, the encounter is ruined when Harmon takes a woman to his hotel room, forcing them to delay their plans. Liddy visits Quinn (Desmond Harrington) with the information he retrieved on Lumen, but gets annoyed when Quinn does not want to pay him his desired quota, so he threatens to tell Debra that he hired him.

Dexter once again attends the seminar, where Chase convinces him in opening up about his experience with Rita's death. During this, Lumen runs into Harmon and flees back to her room. Harmon tries to catch her, only to be knocked unconscious by Dexter. Taking him to the kill room, Harmon refuses to name the other people in the photograph. With Lumen's approval, Dexter kills him. Dexter tells Lumen that he previously killed, explaining his dark past after his mother's death. As they leave the hotel with the dismembered parts, Dexter runs into Chase. Chase says a catchphrase, and Dexter realizes Chase was another of Lumen's captors. That night, Dexter and Lumen dispose of Harmon's body, unaware that Liddy is photographing them from afar.

== Production ==
=== Development ===
The episode was written by executive producer Manny Coto and co-executive producer Wendy West, and was directed by Romeo Tirone. This was Coto's second writing credit, West's fifth writing credit, and Tirone's third directing credit.

== Reception ==
=== Viewers ===
In its original American broadcast, "Take It!" was seen by an estimated 1.94 million household viewers with a 0.9/2 in the 18–49 demographics. This means that 0.9 percent of all households with televisions watched the episode, while 2 percent of all of those watching television at the time of the broadcast watched it. This was a slight increase in viewership from the previous episode, which was watched by an estimated 1.90 million household viewers with a 0.9/2 in the 18–49 demographics.

=== Critical reviews ===
"Take It!" received critical acclaim. Matt Fowler of IGN gave the episode a perfect "masterpiece" 10 out of 10, and wrote, "Look, this doesn't happen very often, so I'll admit it. I wept. "Take It" was an absolute marvel; suspenseful, touching and surprising. I feel like, in a way, so many of the episodes that we've already seen - so much of the series so far - was leading up to the scene near the end between Lumen and Dexter, where they both stood over Cole's dead body and Dexter unburdened his soul. I can't fully explain why I got so emotional. Looking at it objectively, it seems a bit silly, sure. But the music and the sentiment both struck a chord. I cried."

Emily St. James of The A.V. Club gave the episode a "B+" grade and wrote, "I don't know if this is where we're going ultimately, but the question of the lack of moral ambiguity in these last few episodes may be because this is the season where we get little hints of how others see Dexter, of how his mission looks to those who get a glimpse of who he really is. It scares most, but to a woman who endured hell, he might seem a little like a lifeline." Alan Sepinwall of HitFix wrote, "the show is (in the central Dexter plot, at least) well-crafted enough that I continue to watch to enjoy the performances, but my enthusiasm doesn’t extend much beyond that."

Lizzy Goodman of Vulture wrote, "Wow, what an episode! In the ramp-up to the season finale (only three episodes left!), things are getting intense." Sandra Gonzalez of Entertainment Weekly wrote, "Going against his primal instinct (which is, of course, to stay away from people who are crazier than himself) Dexter took the plunge this week and attended his first Jordan Chase seminar/convention of incredibly disturbing individuals. But it was all in the name of research for a job - which in this case was the mission to kill Cole."

Billy Grifter of Den of Geek wrote, "Take It! was a complete and total experience from beginning to end. After I'd watched it, I tried to fuse in my mind those parts I most liked, but eventually concluded that it was great, throughout and ought to be considered in the whole." Gina DiNunno of TV Guide wrote, "Dexter and Lumen are on his boat dumping Cole's body. Just as you think they're sharing a moment over the bags of body parts, we learn Liddy has caught a few snapshots of them in the act."

Claire Zulkey of Los Angeles Times wrote, "Sad to say, even if we knew what Dexter and Lumen mean to each other, I don't think there are boatloads of chemistry between Michael C. Hall and Julia Stiles to enjoy just for fun’s sake." Television Without Pity gave the episode an "A" grade.
