= Beauty and the Beast (Dexter) =

- Dexter episode
- Episode no.: Season 5 Episode 4
- Directed by: Milan Cheylov
- Written by: Jim Leonard
- Cinematography by: Martin Layton
- Editing by: Michael Ruscio
- Original release date: October 17, 2010
- Running time: 51 minutes

Guest appearances
- Julia Stiles as Lumen Pierce (special guest star); Maria Doyle Kennedy as Sonya; April Lee Hernández as Cira Manzon; Raphael Sbarge as Jim McCourt; Joseph Julian Soria as Carlos Fuentes; Brando Eaton as Jonah Mitchell; Saxon Trainor as Clerk

Episode chronology
← Previous "Practically Perfect"	Next → "First Blood"
- Dexter season 5

"Beauty and the Beast" is the fourth episode of the fifth season of the American crime drama television series Dexter. It is the 52nd overall episode of the series and was written by consulting producer Jim Leonard, and was directed by Milan Cheylov. It originally aired on Showtime on October 17, 2010.

Set in Miami, the series centers on Dexter Morgan, a forensic technician specializing in bloodstain pattern analysis for the fictional Miami Metro Police Department, who leads a secret parallel life as a vigilante serial killer, hunting down murderers who have not been adequately punished by the justice system due to corruption or legal technicalities. In the episode, Dexter tries to take care of the woman, while Quinn tries to get in touch with the Mitchell family.

According to Nielsen Media Research, the episode was seen by an estimated 1.79 million household viewers and gained a 0.9/2 ratings share among adults aged 18–49. The episode received positive reviews from critics, who praised the scenes between Dexter and Lumen.

== Plot ==
Dexter (Michael C. Hall) takes the woman (Julia Stiles) to Boyd Fowler's killing room to tend to her wounds. When he is called to investigate the murders at La Botanica, he uses the opportunity to take a DNA sample to identify the woman. Her name is Lumen Pierce, who has no criminal records nor was ever reported missing.

Dexter provides Lumen with medicine he stole from the station, although he cannot let her leave after she witnessed him killing Boyd Fowler. When he returns to his apartment, Sonya (Maria Doyle Kennedy) quits as Harrison's babysitter as she feels he is not honest over his late arrivals. Dexter visits her, convincing her in returning. LaGuerta (Lauren Vélez) forces Angel (David Zayas) to apologize to the officer he assaulted, as he could face charges. Angel reluctantly agrees, and the officer discards the charges. However, McCourt (Raphael Sbarge) is not finished with the investigation, as he is still willing to press charges for attacking an officer. He then talks with LaGuerta over the fight, which started when the officer disrespected her.

Despite being told by the FBI that he cannot contact the Mitchell family, Quinn (Desmond Harrington) nevertheless follows an agent to their new house in witness protection. Noticing Jonah (Brando Eaton) leaving with FBI Agents, Quinn follows them to a convenience store. Quinn approaches Jonah with a photo of Dexter to see if he can identify him as Kyle Butler, but he does not answer. Suddenly, the FBI intercepts him and arrests him. Quinn is subsequently released, but is angrily reprimanded by LaGuerta for not following her orders to stop. Upset that he believes Dexter to be Kyle Butler, she places him on unpaid leave.

Miami Metro find a prime suspect named Carlos Fuentes (Joseph Julian Soria) and raid his house. Carlos slices a hostage's throat, allowing him to escape and disturbing Debra (Jennifer Carpenter). When Dexter returns to the hideout, Lumen attacks him and escapes, managing to get a car to stop. However, she is traumatized when she sees the male passengers, allowing Dexter to capture her again. To show she can trust him, he takes her to the marsh where other women were placed on barrels. He then allows her to injure him with a knife, earning her trust. As she tends his wound, Lumen reveals that there were other men besides Boyd who raped her and the other women.

== Production ==
=== Development ===
The episode was written by consulting producer Jim Leonard, and was directed by Milan Cheylov. This was Leonard's first writing credit, and Cheylov's first directing credit.

== Reception ==
=== Viewers ===
In its original American broadcast, "Beauty and the Beast" was seen by an estimated 1.79 million household viewers with a 0.9/2 in the 18–49 demographics. This means that 0.9 percent of all households with televisions watched the episode, while 2 percent of all of those watching television at the time of the broadcast watched it. This was a 4% decrease in viewership from the previous episode, which was watched by an estimated 1.86 million household viewers with a 0.9/2 in the 18–49 demographics.

=== Critical reviews ===
"Beauty and the Beast" received positive reviews from critics. Matt Fowler of IGN gave the episode a "great" 8.5 out of 10, and wrote, ""Beauty and the Beast" was a fine episode. Not one filled with many scares, thrills or surprises, but one that worked hard to earn the mutual understanding that both Dexter and Lumen come to at the end. I was able to see both sides here and the story crackled with a nice grimy realness that drew me in."

Emily St. James of The A.V. Club gave the episode a "C+" grade and wrote, ""Beauty and the Beast" has some very nice moments – most everything with Dexter and Lumen works – but it also has a lot of throat clearing, and I hope there's less of that in the episodes to come." Lizzy Goodman of Vulture wrote, "Dexter’s dealt with unwanted witnesses and he's protected innocents even when it didn’t serve him, but he's never had to do both at the same time. He has to kill Lumen. And he absolutely cannot kill Lumen. What the hell is he going to do?"

Sandra Gonzalez of Entertainment Weekly wrote, "Dexter has surprised us time and time again with the emotions and traits he is capable of demonstrating - and fabricating - when put to the test. But tonight, we saw him grapple with a different kind of challenge as he tried to decide how to deal with the innocent torture victim who'd witnessed him exterminating Boyd at the end of last week's episode." Billy Grifter of Den of Geek wrote, "In many respects, Beauty And The Beast, was a rather short story in Dexter terms. It introduced Lumen, had some worrying developments for Dexter and Angel, and demonstrated that, in life and death situations, Debra isn’t best equipped to deal with them."

Claire Zulkey of Los Angeles Times wrote, "What was great about tonight's Dexter was that we were supposed to cheer for Dexter, who was basically committing an act of one-on-one terrorism, and root against Quinn, who was actually completely right in his instincts. I think the only people who came out of the episode clean were Harrison and Sonya." Television Without Pity gave the episode an "A" grade.
