= First Blood (Dexter) =

- Dexter episode
- Episode no.: Season 5 Episode 5
- Directed by: Romeo Tirone
- Written by: Tim Schlattmann
- Cinematography by: Martin J. Layton
- Editing by: Louis Cioffi
- Original release date: October 24, 2010
- Running time: 50 minutes

Guest appearances
- Julia Stiles as Lumen Pierce (special guest star); Peter Weller as Stan Liddy; Maria Doyle Kennedy as Sonya; April Lee Hernández as Cira Manzon; Raphael Sbarge as Jim McCourt; Katherine Moennig as Michael Angelo; Chris Payne Gilbert as Robert Brunner; Saxon Trainor as Clerk

Episode chronology
← Previous "Beauty and the Beast"	Next → "Everything Is Illumenated"
- Dexter season 5

"First Blood" is the fifth episode of the fifth season of the American crime drama television series Dexter. It is the 53rd overall episode of the series and was written by co-executive producer Tim Schlattmann, and was directed by Romeo Tirone. It originally aired on Showtime on October 24, 2010.

Set in Miami, the series centers on Dexter Morgan, a forensic technician specializing in bloodstain pattern analysis for the fictional Miami Metro Police Department, who leads a secret parallel life as a vigilante serial killer, hunting down murderers who have not been adequately punished by the justice system due to corruption or legal technicalities. In the episode, Dexter debates over helping Lumen in her quest, while Debra and Angel try to find Fuentes.

According to Nielsen Media Research, the episode was seen by an estimated 1.94 million household viewers and gained a 0.9/2 ratings share among adults aged 18–49. The episode received generally positive reviews from critics, although some expressed criticism for the pacing.

== Plot ==
Dexter (Michael C. Hall) is concerned when Harrison starts displaying violent behavior towards other toddlers during a parenting class. Lumen (Julia Stiles) has declined Dexter's offers to leave Miami, as she wants his help in finding the other men who raped and tortured her. However, Dexter does not believe it might be a good idea for Lumen.

Debra (Jennifer Carpenter) and Angel (David Zayas) try to find Carlos Fuentes' whereabouts, trying to find a clue over a specific tattoo. Masuka (C. S. Lee) gets them in touch with a tattoo artist, Michael Angelo (Katherine Moennig), who notes a pattern to the Santa Muerte gang. While inspecting houses with Cira (April Lee Hernández), Debra discovers two corpses in a house, concluding Fuentes and his brother committed it. Debra also discovers that the logo was not referring to a tattoo, but a nightclub, Club Mayan. Angel believes that LaGuerta (Lauren Vélez) is having an affair with Jim McCourt (Raphael Sbarge) to get rid of his investigation. When he confronts them, he realizes that she was working with McCourt in arresting a corrupt narcotics officer, Stan Liddy (Peter Weller), so the charges could be dropped.

Dexter checks Boyd's house, discovering that someone also broke in. He discovers a fingerprint, and realizes that Lumen was the intruder. Finding that she will now go after Robert Brunner (Chris Payne Gilbert), another rapist, he tries to dissuade her from going on her mission, but she turns him down. To prevent her from killing him, Dexter tracks Brunner in the Julia Tuttle Causeway sex offender colony. He sedates him and takes him to Boyd's killing room. However, he is forced to let him go when Brunner is revealed to be wearing an ankle monitor, realizing that Lumen mistook the man for another. As Lumen prepares to insert Brunner in the Causeway, she is stopped by Dexter, who reveals her mistake. Horrified that she almost killed him, Lumen agrees to leave Miami, with Dexter taking her to the airport.

After Liddy is released, he goes to a bar to meet with Quinn (Desmond Harrington), an old friend of his. As they talk badly over LaGuerta, Quinn decides to help Liddy with the money needed for his incoming hearing. He then asks him to follow Dexter, and Liddy agrees. Dexter, meanwhile, returns to parenting class, defending Harrison's actions while proclaiming he will protect him. Lumen is revealed to have tricked Dexter, showing she is still in Miami.

== Production ==
=== Development ===
The episode was written by co-executive producer Tim Schlattmann, and was directed by Romeo Tirone. This was Schlattmann's ninth writing credit, and Tirone's second directing credit.

== Reception ==
=== Viewers ===
In its original American broadcast, "First Blood" was seen by an estimated 1.94 million household viewers with a 0.9/2 in the 18–49 demographics. This means that 0.9 percent of all households with televisions watched the episode, while 2 percent of all of those watching television at the time of the broadcast watched it. This was a 8% increase in viewership from the previous episode, which was watched by an estimated 1.79 million household viewers with a 0.9/2 in the 18–49 demographics.

=== Critical reviews ===
"First Blood" received generally positive reviews from critics. Matt Fowler of IGN gave the episode a "great" 8 out of 10, and wrote, "Look, a mediocre episode of Dexter is still much better than most other TV shows' best efforts. Yes, we've now come to the typical "circling pattern" that happens most mid-seasons. Even as great as Season 4 of Dexter was, it still suffered a teensy bit in the middle. Right now, most of us really just want Dexter to go out and hunt down the bastards that tied up and torture-raped Lumen, but it looks like it's still going to take a few episodes to convince him to go "all in.""

Emily St. James of The A.V. Club gave the episode a "B–" grade and wrote, "If season five of Dexter is about how you never wholly move on from the horrors that crop up in your life, Stiles is making Lumen an example of someone where the wounds are still so very fresh." Lizzy Goodman of Vulture wrote, "Why is Dexter so panicked about the ways in which Lumen and Harrison remind him of himself? Aren't good people allowed to be bad from time to time? No. Not really. Not in Dexter's world."

Alan Sepinwall of HitFix wrote, "Some good stuff this week, including Lumen going through airport security, Harry showing Dexter the error of his ways and Masuka teaching Deb about the ways of body art. On the downside, the only reason I'm glad I didn't fast forward through all the Batista/Laguerta scenes is because it wound up tying back into the Quinn storyline." Sandra Gonzalez of Entertainment Weekly wrote, "I hate to say it, but Dexter would've been much better off had he followed Harry's advice to kill Lumen. As we saw this week, she turned out to be the big cherry on top of Dex's ever-growing fudge-me sundae of problems."

Billy Grifter of Den of Geek wrote, "Overall, "First Blood", was more connectivity than a thematic story, but it moved things along to a more interesting place from where the season will meet the halfway point." Gina DiNunno of TV Guide wrote, "the most unsettling thing about the situation is that Quinn wants to hire the disgraced, crooked cop to dig up the dirt on Dexter. Things are definitely going to get interesting."

Claire Zulkey of Los Angeles Times wrote, "Quinn is becoming the most evil person on the show, and now he has an unofficial partner to help him carry out his dirty work. Dexter had better quit messing around with that parachute at Mommy and Me and watch his back." Television Without Pity gave the episode a "C+" grade.
