= Everything Is Illumenated =

- Dexter episode
- Episode no.: Season 5 Episode 6
- Directed by: Steve Shill
- Written by: Wendy West
- Cinematography by: Romeo Tirone
- Editing by: David Latham
- Original release date: October 31, 2010
- Running time: 49 minutes

Guest appearances
- Julia Stiles as Lumen Pierce (special guest star); Peter Weller as Stan Liddy; Maria Doyle Kennedy as Sonya; April Lee Hernández as Cira Manzon; Sean O'Bryan as Dan Mendell; Geoff Pierson as Thomas Matthews

Episode chronology
← Previous "First Blood"	Next → "Circle Us"
- Dexter season 5

"Everything Is Illumenated" is the sixth episode of the fifth season of the American crime drama television series Dexter. It is the 54th overall episode of the series and was written by co-executive producer Wendy West, and was directed by Steve Shill. It originally aired on Showtime on October 31, 2010.

Set in Miami, the series centers on Dexter Morgan, a forensic technician specializing in bloodstain pattern analysis for the fictional Miami Metro Police Department, who leads a secret parallel life as a vigilante serial killer, hunting down murderers who have not been adequately punished by the justice system due to corruption or legal technicalities. In the episode, Dexter reluctantly helps Lumen when her plan goes awry, just as Miami Metro is set to arrive at the location.

According to Nielsen Media Research, the episode was seen by an estimated 1.63 million household viewers and gained a 0.8/2 ratings share among adults aged 18–49. The episode received mostly positive reviews from critics, who praised the writing and tension in the episode.

== Plot ==
Dexter (Michael C. Hall) moves his stuff from Rita's house, planning to sell it. Debra (Jennifer Carpenter) has agreed to move out of his apartment, and he uses the opportunity to place his blood slides back. While Dexter believes Lumen (Julia Stiles) is back in Minneapolis, she is actually working on a new operation in Miami.

That night, Dexter targets Lance Robinson (Chad Allen), who has had sexual encounters with other homosexual men who later were reported dead. He meets with Lance and sedates him, getting him inside an RV. Before setting up the kill room, Dexter is called by Lumen, who reveals she is in Miami and needs his help, having shot one of her rapists at a warehouse. Dexter is forced to leave Lance sedated in his trunk, while he meets with Lumen at the warehouse, noticing that the rapist, Dan Mendell (Sean O'Bryan), was still alive and fled the scene. Noticing the blood trails, Dexter and Lumen follow Mendell into the warehouse.

Debra and Angel (David Zayas) stake out the Club Mayan, hoping to find the Fuentes brothers. When reports of a gunshot in the warehouse arrive, Debra calls Dexter to meet up at the location. Dexter and Lumen find a wounded Mendell, and Dexter notices that he is a dentist with a family. Lumen maintains he is her rapist, while Mendell proclaims he is innocent. As Dexter and Lumen argue, they find Mendell making a phone call to someone, warning that Lumen is alive. Dexter snaps his neck, and then gets Lumen to stay at Rita's house. Lance regains consciousness and attempts to escape, but Dexter kills him, and stages their deaths as a cover for them to escape.

When Debra and Masuka (C. S. Lee) arrive, Dexter shows up. Masuka concludes Lance and Mendell were having a sexual encounter, accidentally resulting in their deaths, which Dexter supports. Angel notices a woman, Yasmin Aragon (Jessica Camacho) in the Club Mayan and brings her over to help them target the Fuentes brothers. Quinn (Desmond Harrington) meets with Liddy (Peter Weller), who states Dexter has a clean record, but he suspects he might hide something. Dexter returns to Rita's house, finding Lumen in the bathtub. Lumen opens up about her life, revealing she was engaged to a man, but fled on her wedding day because she was afraid. She wants to get revenge on her rapist, as she feels she will finally find peace. Dexter decides to help her get revenge, and find the men responsible.

== Production ==
=== Development ===
The episode was written by co-executive producer Wendy West, and was directed by Steve Shill. This was West's fourth writing credit, and Shill's seventh directing credit.

== Reception ==
=== Viewers ===
In its original American broadcast, "Everything Is Illumenated" was seen by an estimated 1.63 million household viewers with a 0.8/2 in the 18–49 demographics. This means that 0.8 percent of all households with televisions watched the episode, while 2 percent of all of those watching television at the time of the broadcast watched it. This was a 16% decrease in viewership from the previous episode, which was watched by an estimated 1.94 million household viewers with a 0.9/2 in the 18–49 demographics.

=== Critical reviews ===
"Everything Is Illumenated" received mostly positive reviews from critics. Matt Fowler of IGN gave the episode an "amazing" 9 out of 10, and wrote, "Now that's what I call a freakin' episode of Dexter! I was happy, but also not surprised, to see that "Everything Is Illumenated" was written by Wendy West – the ingenious gal behind last season's crackling "Hungry Man". I would have to say that the best part of this taut, excellent episode was how it didn't completely fall apart or go off the rails when it could have."

Emily St. James of The A.V. Club gave the episode a "B" grade and wrote, "After roughly five episodes of not a whole lot happening, it's nice to see the story really kick into gear this week on Dexter. And I like the way that Lumen's uncertainty on the guy she's caught plays into the way the show has switched to just having Dexter catch up with his prey without us seeing the research. Do we trust Lumen to pick the right men out of a lineup and kill them? Dexter sure doesn't. And yet we implicitly trust everything he's telling us, even as he's pretty much doing the same thing as Lumen, just with more experience. There are a lot of fascinating depths to plumb in this new relationship, and I hope the show doesn't cheapen it somehow. Lumen could be the best thing to happen to Dexter in eons if the show plays its cards right."

Lizzy Goodman of Vulture wrote, "Dexter is not just a good show, it's a great show, in part because of episodes like this one, in which the writers demonstrate their willingness to let the characters be real, feeling humans, not just postmodern avatars. And the actors prove they can display that vulnerability without resorting to sentimentality." Sandra Gonzalez of Entertainment Weekly wrote, "Lumen's likely continued existence on Dexter is disappointing for a number of reasons. Most important of them? The storyline we've been building on - a network of bad men doing terrible things - is pretty strong stuff; beyond providing an initial connection between Dexter and these villains, though, Lumen's involvement hasn't paid dramatic dividends."

Billy Grifter of Den of Geek wrote, "Dexter is like a madman diving at high speed, who puts on the cruise control and then has a little nap in the confident knowledge that something at the next junction is bound to wake him. There's a certain logic in most actions, but probably only the type that sociopaths would apply." Gina DiNunno of TV Guide wrote, "The team is convinced, and Dexter is off the hook yet again. I have to say though, that one was too close for comfort, and my stomach is still in a knot."

Claire Zulkey of Los Angeles Times wrote, "A lot happened on Sunday night's episode, but the one thing that stuck with me was a desire to implore the writers of Dexter to please give Deb Morgan a break already. I was half laughing, half groaning when she asked Quinn to tell her if it was going to end badly." Television Without Pity gave the episode a "B–" grade.
