= Circle Us =

- Dexter episode
- Episode no.: Season 5 Episode 7
- Directed by: John Dahl
- Written by: Scott Buck
- Cinematography by: Martin J. Layton
- Editing by: Michael Ruscio
- Original release date: November 7, 2010
- Running time: 48 minutes

Guest appearances
- Julia Stiles as Lumen Pierce (special guest star); Jonny Lee Miller as Jordan Chase; Peter Weller as Stan Liddy; Maria Doyle Kennedy as Sonya; April Lee Hernández as Cira Manzon; Chris Vance as Cole Harmon; Geoff Pierson as Thomas Matthews; Joseph Julian Soria as Carlos Fuentes

Episode chronology
← Previous "Everything Is Illumenated"	Next → "Take It!"
- Dexter season 5

"Circle Us" is the seventh episode of the fifth season of the American crime drama television series Dexter. It is the 55th overall episode of the series and was written by executive producer Scott Buck, and was directed by John Dahl. It originally aired on Showtime on November 7, 2010.

Set in Miami, the series centers on Dexter Morgan, a forensic technician specializing in bloodstain pattern analysis for the fictional Miami Metro Police Department, who leads a secret parallel life as a vigilante serial killer, hunting down murderers who have not been adequately punished by the justice system due to corruption or legal technicalities. In the episode, Dexter and Lumen try to frame Boyd when one of her captors is discovered, while Miami Metro leads an operation on a nightclub to capture the Fuentes brothers.

According to Nielsen Media Research, the episode was seen by an estimated 1.90 million household viewers and gained a 0.9/2 ratings share among adults aged 18–49. The episode received highly positive reviews from critics, who praised the nightclub sequence and character development.

== Plot ==
Dexter (Michael C. Hall) allows Lumen (Julia Stiles) to stay at Rita's house. He wants to help her get revenge against her captors, and she describes a few of them, but struggles to recall their names. At the marsh, a group of men retrieve the barrels dropped in the water for a man. The man drives off in his truck, but gets into a car accident.

Miami Metro investigates the truck accident, discovering five barrels with dead women inside. The driver fled the scene, and Dexter worries the investigation will lead the police to Lumen. When he notices Lumen nearby, he goes to talk to her, which is seen by Quinn (Desmond Harrington). The truck is owned by Jordan Chase (Jonny Lee Miller), a motivational speaker, to whom Dexter listened in Boyd's house. Chase and his security guard, Cole Harmon (Chris Vance) arrive at the station, with Chase providing an alibi, while Harmon, who owns the truck, claims it was stolen. Nevertheless, Harmon is still considered a prime suspect, as his fingerprints were found in the truck.

Miami Metro also prepares an operation, wherein they will capture the Fuentes brothers in the Club Mayan, with Yasmin (Jessica Camacho) helping them. When the Fuentes brothers want Cira (April Lee Hernández) to join them, LaGuerta (Lauren Vélez) tells her to comply. Realizing she is a cop, a gunfight starts, with Yasmin fatally shot in the process. Debra (Jennifer Carpenter) kills Carlos (Joseph Julian Soria), but Marco escapes. Matthews (Geoff Pierson) is angry at the operation, as Yasmin and another civilian died. Angel (David Zayas) tries to comfort LaGuerta, but she maintains she did nothing wrong during the operation. Quinn is visited by Liddy (Peter Weller), who is investigating Lumen, but considers continuing to employ him when he demands more money.

Lumen identifies Harmon as one of her captors, but does not want the police to take care of him as she feels she will not get justice. Dexter and Lumen then decide to sneak into Boyd's house to frame him for the truck accident. When Miami Metro believes this theory, Harmon provides a false testimony where he names Boyd as a stalker. Dexter waits for Harmon to arrive at his house, but Harmon surprises him and attacks him, until Lumen knocks him out. They are forced to flee when an alarm is heard, but retrieve a photo of Harmon with Boyd and Dan Mendell, along with two unknown figures. Feeling he can trust her, he introduces her to Harrison.

== Production ==
=== Development ===
The episode was written by executive producer Scott Buck, and was directed by John Dahl. This was Buck's 11th writing credit, and Dahl's sixth directing credit.

== Reception ==
=== Viewers ===
In its original American broadcast, "Circle Us" was seen by an estimated 1.90 million household viewers with a 0.9/2 in the 18–49 demographics. This means that 0.9 percent of all households with televisions watched the episode, while 2 percent of all of those watching television at the time of the broadcast watched it. This was a 16% increase in viewership from the previous episode, which was watched by an estimated 1.63 million household viewers with a 0.8/2 in the 18–49 demographics.

=== Critical reviews ===
"Circle Us" received highly positive reviews from critics. Matt Fowler of IGN gave the episode a "great" 8.5 out of 10, and wrote, ""Sometimes partners find us," Dexter thinks to himself as he watches Julia Stiles' Lumen playfully bond with his son, Harrison. "Circle Us" was an excellent episode of what's slowly become a very suspenseful season of Dexter, but I still have a few reservations about where this entire story is headed. There are a ton of moving parts right now and as busy and violent as this chapter was, it still felt like we were creeping along in a typical connector-episode."

Emily St. James of The A.V. Club gave the episode a "B+" grade and wrote, "Honestly, "Circle Us" might be about as good as one of these mid-season episodes of Dexter can get. There was minimal time spent on embarrassing storylines for the supporting cast. There were some big revelations uncovered. There was the bare minimum of silly dialogue from Dexter voiceover. There was no Harry being stupid. There was some solid movement forward on most of the season's big arcs. About the only criticism I can come up with about the episode on a macro level is that I can't possibly imagine watching this episode independent of any other episodes of the show and having any clue what was going on. But that's been a criticism one could level at the show for quite a while now. In almost all ways, "Circle Us" was a solid episode of the show, one that just took the time it needed to tell the bits of the story it needed to tell."

Lizzy Goodman of Vulture wrote, "Who would replace her if she gets the ax? Deb is falling, once again, for a super shady dude, just as her career is taking off. Will the thing with Quinn derail her? And Dexter is aligning himself with a girl he barely knows who is in a state of PTSD-fueled bloodlust. I'm worried. And really psyched for next Sunday." Sandra Gonzalez of Entertainment Weekly wrote, "Admittedly, I haven't been Lumen's biggest fan, but the show's latest installment allowed me to see function to Lumen's story beyond being a pebble in Dexter's shoe. Meanwhile, Dexter realized he might have found something he once believed to be unfeasible: a relatively sane person on whom he could depend, both as a killer and as a man."

Billy Grifter of Den of Geek wrote, "There's a joy in Dexter currently that seems like an antidote to the crushing depression of Rita's demise. Not only was "Circle Us" a turning point for season five, finally offering up the major villain, but it was also one of the funniest of the shows so far." Gina DiNunno of TV Guide wrote, "at least now, Dex looks at her more as a partner than a nuisance. He even brings Harrison over to meet her, combining his worlds even more."

Claire Zulkey of Los Angeles Times wrote, "Fortunately, although the Dexter/Lumen story line isn't currently gripping me, I thought the other plots in Sunday night's episode were especially compelling - the show is exciting when Dexter must compete with the police department to get his man, and that's what's happening now." Television Without Pity gave the episode a "B" grade.
