= Hello, Bandit =

- Dexter episode
- Episode no.: Season 5 Episode 2
- Directed by: John Dahl
- Written by: Scott Buck
- Cinematography by: Romeo Tirone
- Editing by: Louis Cioffi
- Original release date: October 3, 2010
- Running time: 50 minutes

Guest appearances
- Shawn Hatosy as Boyd Fowler; April Lee Hernández as Cira Manzon; Christina Robinson as Astor Bennett; Preston Bailey as Cody Bennett; Rick Peters as Elliot Larson

Episode chronology
← Previous "My Bad"	Next → "Practically Perfect"
- Dexter season 5

"Hello, Bandit" is the second episode of the fifth season of the American crime drama television series Dexter. It is the 50th overall episode of the series and was written by executive producer Scott Buck, and was directed by John Dahl. It originally aired on Showtime on October 3, 2010.

Set in Miami, the series centers on Dexter Morgan, a forensic technician specializing in bloodstain pattern analysis for the fictional Miami Metro Police Department, who leads a secret parallel life as a vigilante serial killer, hunting down murderers who have not been adequately punished by the justice system due to corruption or legal technicalities. In the episode, Dexter tries to raise Astor and Cody, while also pursuing a man who left blood in a rented van.

According to Nielsen Media Research, the episode was seen by an estimated 1.70 million household viewers and gained a 0.8/2 ratings share among adults aged 18–49. The episode received positive reviews from critics, who praised Dexter's storyline, but expressing criticism for the subplots.

== Plot ==
Dexter (Michael C. Hall) gets Astor (Christina Robinson) and Cody (Preston Bailey) to temporarily move to his apartment. He also participates in his interview with the FBI, and they are confident he has an alibi, as he was at Arthur's house during the time of the murder.

Dexter rents a van to help the kids, discovering blood in the vehicle. He investigates the last person to rent the van, Boyd Fowler (Shawn Hatosy), who works in sanitation. To arrange a meeting with Boyd, Dexter kills and sets up a raccoon on a rural road and calls it into the Department of Sanitation. Then he waits by his car until Boyd arrives in his yellow pickup truck. Later, he sneaks into his house, finding a locked door to the attic. When Boyd returns, he is forced to flee. He follows Boyd, who drops a barrel in a marsh. Dexter's life with Astor and Cody is not easy, as Astor is still upset with him, blaming him for Rita's death. They also skip school to go to their house, staring at the bathtub where their mother was murdered.

Miami Metro investigates a murder in a Venezuelan neighborhood, where a woman was beheaded while candles were placed next to her. Police Officer Cira Manzon (April Lee Hernández) believes that a gang known as the "Santa Muerte cult" was involved in her death. Just as they conclude she was murdered with a machete, they are called when the woman's husband is also found dead. Due to the lack of space at the apartment, Debra (Jennifer Carpenter) stays with Quinn (Desmond Harrington) at his house, but she makes it clear their sexual encounter does not mean anything. Angel (David Zayas) discovers that LaGuerta (Lauren Vélez) has over $200,000 in a savings account, which he never knew. LaGuerta states that it is for her retirement, and she did not tell him because he is not reliable with money.

Quinn checks on the sketches provided by people who saw Kyle Butler, deciding to keep his own investigation. Dexter decides to let Astor and Cody go live with their grandparents outside the city, feeling it will be better for them. That night, he checks the barrel in the marsh, finding the corpse of a woman. As he surveys the area, he finds more barrels.

== Production ==
=== Development ===
The episode was written by executive producer Scott Buck, and was directed by John Dahl. This was Buck's tenth writing credit, and Dahl's fifth directing credit.

== Reception ==
=== Viewers ===
In its original American broadcast, "Hello, Bandit" was seen by an estimated 1.70 million household viewers with a 0.8/2 in the 18–49 demographics. This means that 0.8 percent of all households with televisions watched the episode, while 2 percent of all of those watching television at the time of the broadcast watched it. This was a 4% decrease in viewership from the previous episode, which was watched by an estimated 1.77 million household viewers with a 0.8/2 in the 18–49 demographics.

=== Critical reviews ===
"Hello, Bandit" received positive reviews from critics. Matt Fowler of IGN gave the episode a "great" 8 out of 10, and wrote, "I guess the writers have shown restraint by waiting two whole seasons before pairing them up, but I still feel like rolling my eyes over it. I think this new coupling was mostly done in order to complicate, and throw a cog into, Quinn's investigation of Dexter down the line, but it still doesn't feel quite right."

Emily St. James of The A.V. Club gave the episode a "B–" grade and wrote, "After last week's sensational season premiere, Dexter probably had to take a couple of steps back to keep the show from getting too dark and despairing. In the process, though, the series re-acquired a case of the stupids it seemed to have set aside last week. "Hello, Bandit" isn't terrible or anything, but it has moments in it that are as idiotic as anything the show's ever done (and that's saying something), as well as largely useless subplots for the supporting cast. I like where the episode ends up – in a place that's very dreary – but it sure seems like the road there is riddled with problematic decisions and weird plotting." Lizzy Goodman of Vulture wrote, "Once again, Dexter's attempts at balance have backfired, but this time he can't just go back to serving his Dark Passenger and aspiring to one day have a family life. He's already a father. He was somebody's husband. And these truths have changed him."

Alan Sepinwall of HitFix wrote, "“Hello Bandit” did some interesting things, including Dexter trying to deal with the responsibilities of single parenthood and the introduction of Shawn Hatosy as the first of our guest stars here to illustrate Dexter's journey along the Seven Stages of Grief. On the negative side: more Deb/Quinn and more Batista/LaGuerta." Sandra Gonzalez of Entertainment Weekly wrote, "The post-Rita unease continued this week both on Dexter and with Dexter, as the serial killer attempted to resurrect even the smallest sense of normal for the sake of his family. But Dexter learned this week that - like his family's matriarch - all things normal might now exist only in memories."

Billy Grifter of Den of Geek wrote, "This wasn't the best Dexter episode ever, but I accept there has to be ones like this to prime the season for later, enjoyable as it was." Gina DiNunno of TV Guide wrote, "Down and out, Dexter follows a trail to find Boyd's dumping ground in hopes that having the purpose of tracking his target will make him feel better. Unfortunately, it's not, and he doesn't know what will snap him out of his funk. But in the process, he discovers dozens of trash can in a swamp filled with girls soaking in formaldehyde."

Claire Zulkey of Los Angeles Times wrote, "Dexter finally lets go of the kids, mourning the fact that they served as a reminder of his lost innocence and the fact that he still cares about something. But it's back to business, as he heads to the swamp and opens up one of Boyd's oil drums, which aren’t full of dead animals but dead ladies. Back to work, Dexter." Television Without Pity gave the episode a "B+" grade.
