= Dexter season 5 =

Drama series

Dexter
- Season 5
- DVD cover
- Showrunner: Chip Johannessen
- Starring: Michael C. Hall; Jennifer Carpenter; Desmond Harrington; C. S. Lee; Lauren Vélez; David Zayas; James Remar
- No. of episodes: 12

Release
- Original network: Showtime
- Original release: September 26 – December 12, 2010

Season chronology
- ← Previous; Season 4 Next → Season 6

The fifth season of Dexter premiered on September 26, 2010, and consisted of 12 episodes. The season focuses on how Dexter comes to terms with the aftermath of the Season 4 finale, helping a woman stop a group of serial rapists, and avoiding a corrupt cop who learns his deadly secret.

== Plot ==
As the police arrive at Dexter's house, he is apparently in shock and, either because he feels guilty that his relationship with the Trinity Killer, Arthur Mitchell, caused Rita's death or because he is answering a question ("Sir, did you say that you called this in?") asked by one of the police officers, says "it was me," which draws suspicion. Joey Quinn immediately notices that Rita's death did not follow Trinity's modus operandi. He is also suspicious of Dexter's unemotional manner after the incident. Astor takes Rita's death particularly hard, and blames Dexter for it. Unable to reconcile, Astor decides that she wants to live with her grandparents in Orlando, Florida, and she and Cody leave Miami.

Miami Metro begins investigating a severed head left in a Venezuelan neighborhood, and also find several related cases. The suspect is quickly nicknamed the Santa Muerte Killer. The FBI, unable to find Arthur Mitchell, follows its only other lead, Kyle Butler (Dexter's alias when interacting with the Mitchell family). Quinn recognizes the similarities between sketches of Kyle Butler and Dexter. Dexter finds a Department of Sanitation worker, Boyd Fowler, who is responsible for the deaths of several women. Dexter hires a nanny named Sonya to care for Harrison. Dexter eventually kills Fowler, but the crime is witnessed by Fowler's next victim, Lumen Pierce, who he has in captivity.

Dexter tries to care for Lumen, but she is understandably suspicious of his motives, asking Dexter if he is going to "sell her". Quinn tracks down the Mitchells, who are now in witness protection. He approaches Jonah Mitchell at a small convenience store and shows him a picture of Dexter, asking if it is Kyle Butler, but an undercover FBI agent interrupts before Jonah can answer. Quinn is suspended without pay by LaGuerta for disobeying her orders as she continues to defend Dexter. With Dexter's help, Deb closes in on the Santa Muerte killer. Debra lets him escape during a hostage standoff in order to save the hostage's life.

Lumen tells Dexter that she was attacked by a group of men, not merely Fowler on his own. Lumen asks Dexter to help her seek revenge on these men, but he initially refuses. After Lumen continues on her own and mistakenly targets the wrong suspect, Dexter teaches her the importance of knowing a person is guilty. Dexter accompanies Lumen to the airport and believes she has left Miami. Instead, Lumen remains behind, hunts down and shoots one of her attackers, and out of desperation asks Dexter to help her clean up the crime scene. Dexter reluctantly agrees, and they finish moments before homicide police locate the crime scene. Lumen later reveals to Dexter that killing one of her attackers brought her a sense of peace. She tearfully recognizes that it will not last and that she will have to find (and kill) the others to experience that peace again. Dexter recognizes this as being her own Dark Passenger. He decides to help her, partly to atone for his earlier inability to save Rita.

Meanwhile, LaGuerta and Angel Batista make their marriage public but are having marital issues, and Quinn and Debra become romantically involved. When Angel gets involved in a bar fight which gets him in trouble with the Internal Affairs Department (IAD), LaGuerta saves him by helping IAD set up a sting on another cop who is under suspicion, Stan Liddy. Liddy develops a friendship with Quinn, their common bond being they were both "betrayed" by LaGuerta, and Quinn pays Liddy to investigate Dexter. Debra remains unaware that Quinn suspects her brother is Kyle Butler.

Dexter and Lumen hunt the other people responsible for torturing her, including their leader, motivational speaker Jordan Chase, and people associated with him. As Quinn's relationship with Deb deepens, he tries to stop Liddy's investigation, but by this point Liddy has taken pictures of Dexter and Lumen on Dexter's boat disposing of large plastic bags and video of them practicing for a kill, and is determined to continue. Having lost his job and become convinced Dexter is a criminal, Liddy captures Dexter and calls Quinn to tell him to come to his location. A struggle ensues and Dexter kills Liddy and destroys Liddy's surveillance footage. Dexter learns Lumen has been kidnapped by Jordan Chase and leaves the crime scene to try to find her. Quinn, having responded to a call from Liddy, finds Liddy's van locked and apparently empty; a drop of Liddy's blood falls on his shoe, unnoticed. Dexter returns home to collect his tools to attack Jordan. He is surprised to see Astor and Cody who want to have their baby brother Harrison's first birthday party in Miami and stay with him the coming summer.

Before Dexter can confront Jordan, he is called away to Liddy's crime scene, where the police suspect Quinn's involvement in Liddy's death after noticing the blood drop that fell on his shoe earlier. Quinn initially complies but later refuses to answer questions. Later, Dexter learns of Jordan's (and Lumen's) whereabouts. The two briefly struggle. Dexter overpowers Jordan, and then allows Lumen to kill Jordan. After the kill, Deb discovers the two of them, though they are behind translucent plastic and she is not able to see their identities. Understanding that one of the two figures must be an escaped victim, Deb sympathizes and retreats so they can escape. After Jordan's death, Lumen no longer feels the need to kill and tearfully admits she needs to move on, leaving Dexter distraught.

Quinn talks with Dexter at Harrison's birthday party, where Quinn thanks Dexter for exonerating him, as Dexter has faked a blood test to clear Quinn. Quinn and Deb appear to reconcile, as do Maria and Angel. Blowing out Harrison's birthday candle, Dexter wonders if there is hope for him — to have a genuine relationship, to be human — but he doubts it.

== Cast ==
=== Main ===
- Michael C. Hall as Dexter Morgan
- Jennifer Carpenter as Debra Morgan
- Desmond Harrington as Joey Quinn
- C. S. Lee as Vince Masuka
- Lauren Vélez as María LaGuerta
- David Zayas as Angel Batista
- James Remar as Harry Morgan

=== Recurring ===
- Peter Weller as Stan Liddy
- Maria Doyle Kennedy as Sonya
- April Lee Hernández as Cira Manzon
- Adam John Harrington as Ray Walker
- Christina Robinson as Astor Bennett
- Chris Vance as Cole Harmon
- Steve Eastin as Bill Bennett
- Preston Bailey as Cody Bennett
- Kathleen Noone as Maura Bennett
- Rick Peters as Elliot
- Raphael Sbarge as Jim McCourt
- Geoff Pierson as Tom Matthews
- Tasia Sherel as Francis
- Brando Eaton as Jonah Mitchell

=== Special guest star ===
- Julia Stiles as Lumen Pierce

=== Guest appearance ===
- Julie Benz as Rita Morgan
- Jonny Lee Miller as Jordan Chase
- Katherine Moennig as Michael Angelo

=== Guest cast ===
- Angela Bettis as Emily Birch
- Shawn Hatosy as Boyd Fowler
- Sean O'Bryan as Dan Mendell
- Joseph Julian Soria as Carlos Fuentes
- Josue Aguirre as Marco Fuentes
- Chad Allen as Lance Robinson
- Tabitha Morella as Olivia
- Daniel Travis as Barry Kurt
- Michael Durrell as Stuart Frank
- Scott Grimes as Alex Tilden

== Crew ==
Fourth season executive producers John Goldwyn, Sara Colleton, Scott Buck and Michael C. Hall all remained in their roles for the fifth season. Past executive producer and show runner Clyde Phillips remained part of the crew as a consultant for the fifth season. Following the conclusion of 24, Manny Coto and Chip Johannessen joined the crew as executive producers. Johannessen served as the show runner for the fifth season. Jim Leonard also joined the crew as a consulting producer.

Fourth season supervising producers Timothy Schlattmann and Wendy West were promoted to co-executive producers for the fifth season. Fourth season producer Lauren Gussis was promoted to supervising producer. Robert Lloyd Lewis returned as the on set producer. Co-producers Gary Law and Chad Tomasoski also retained their roles. Fourth season story editor Scott Reynolds was promoted to executive story editor for the fifth .

== Episodes ==
No. overall	No. in season	Title	Directed by	Written by	Original release date	U.S. viewers (millions)
49	1	"My Bad"	Steve Shill	Chip Johannessen	September 26, 2010	1.77
In the aftermath of last season's finale, Rita's death has left Dexter feeling responsible and guilty for not being there to save her from the Trinity Killer. Unable to deal with the trauma, Dexter makes a drastic decision that will affect everyone around him. Quinn stirs up trouble at the station when he notes that Rita's murder, which is being pinned on the Trinity Killer, does not fit his normal murder profile. Things get even more heated when Quinn learns about Dexter punching the neighbor over him kissing Rita, and suggests to LaGuerta that they consider the possibility that Dexter is the murderer. Meanwhile, Quinn offers Debra support, causing her to see Quinn in a new light.
50	2	"Hello, Bandit"	John Dahl	Scott Buck	October 3, 2010	1.70
In his new role as single father, an anxious Dexter tries to get his family's routine back on track, to begin the process of moving on from Rita's death. Dexter attempts to focus all his attention on the kids while curbing his dark urges. But when evidence of foul play falls into his lap, Dexter makes a horrific discovery, setting him on the trail of his next victim, Boyd Fowler. Debra, trying to be the good sister, shares her apartment with Dexter and the kids only to find there is no room for her. Also, Miami Metro has their work cut out when a grisly decapitation murder scene is found in a Venezuelan neighborhood.
51	3	"Practically Perfect"	Ernest Dickerson	Manny Coto	October 10, 2010	1.86
Dexter finds himself in a strange new world when he attempts to hire a nanny for Harrison so he can have time to continue to stalk and kill Boyd Fowler. Meanwhile, Debra, who takes the lead on a bizarre double homicide, is displeased when Batista suggests bringing in an annoying rookie officer who has her own theories on the case. Things heat up for Dexter when Quinn notices strange similarities between Trinity Killer associate 'Kyle Butler' and Dexter Morgan.
52	4	"Beauty and the Beast"	Milan Cheylov	Jim Leonard	October 17, 2010	1.79
Dexter finds himself in a strange situation when, instead of taking a life, he has to save one when he must decide what to do with the frightened young woman, identified as Lumen Pierce (Julia Stiles) who witnessed him killing Boyd. Meanwhile, Debra has a scary confrontation with a key suspect in the Santa Muerte murder cases. Quinn continues following up on the strange similarities between 'Kyle Butler' and Dexter Morgan.
53	5	"First Blood"	Romeo Tirone	Tim Schlattmann	October 24, 2010	1.94
When Dexter is saddled with an unwanted conspirator, he is forced to make some hard decisions about her fate when Lumen wants in on his killing routine to find the men who abducted and raped her. Meanwhile, Dexter wonders if Rita's death has awakened a darkness inside baby Harrison. Due to Quinn's recent suspension, Debra works the Santa Muerte case alone, leaving Quinn time to enlist an old friend, Stan Liddy (Peter Weller) to look into Dexter.
54	6	"Everything Is Illumenated"	Steve Shill	Wendy West	October 31, 2010	1.63
Striving to bring some normalcy back into his shattered life, Dexter figures the answer lies in finding a new serial killer to bring down, but his quest gets thrown off course when his troubled new acquaintance, Lumen, requires his help to find one of her attackers. Meanwhile, Batista uncovers a revealing new lead in the Santa Muerte homicides, and Quinn gets a tip about Dexter from Liddy, but is not sure he can trust his source.
55	7	"Circle Us"	John Dahl	Scott Buck	November 7, 2010	1.90
By aiding Lumen who has shot one of her attackers in an old warehouse, Dexter puts himself on a collision course with Debra and the homicide division, and things get worse when he is brought in to work a horrific crime scene. Meanwhile, Debra's investigation into the Santa Muerte killings leads her into a deadly confrontation with the killers. Also, Quinn begins to question Liddy in his investigation of Dexter.
56	8	"Take It!"	Romeo Tirone	Manny Coto & Wendy West	November 14, 2010	1.94
Dexter and Lumen take the opportunity to track a vicious murderer while attending a self-help seminar from Jordan Chase (Jonny Lee Miller). Meanwhile, the fallout from the aborted sting in the Santa Muerte homicides puts Debra in hot water and places Batista in a difficult situation as LaGuerta tries to shift the blame away from herself and onto Debra. Things tense up between Quinn and Liddy as Liddy begins to grow more obsessive and greedy.
57	9	"Teenage Wasteland"	Ernest Dickerson	Lauren Gussis	November 21, 2010	2.11
Dexter and Lumen are on the hunt for a new victim but get sidetracked by the arrival of a surprise visitor. Meanwhile, as a result of fallout from the Santa Muerte case, Debra gets reassigned to the file room, where she is still able to dig up new evidence in the Barrel Girls investigation.
58	10	"In the Beginning"	Keith Gordon	Scott Reynolds	November 28, 2010	2.54
Just as Dexter discovers a possible ally in the pursuit of Lumen's former captors, he and Lumen are forced to step down as Homicide uncovers some key evidence linked to one of their prior victims. Debra, who has been reassigned to the Barrel Girls murders, positively identifies two more suspects in the case.
59	11	"Hop a Freighter"	John Dahl	Story by : Karen Campbell; Teleplay by : Scott Buck & Tim Schlattman	December 5, 2010	2.26
Dexter and Lumen's plans are momentarily thwarted when Dexter is forced into damage control after he concedes that someone outside of Miami Metro has taken an interest in them. Debra's speculation on the missing Barrel Girls suspects begins to take shape. Quinn finds himself more involved in a homicide than he would like to be.
60	12	"The Big One"	Steve Shill	Chip Johannessen & Manny Coto	December 12, 2010	2.48
In the season finale, Dexter's situation grows desperate when he discovers that Lumen has been set up. Despite knowing he is being baited into a trap, Dexter risks everything to save Lumen from the murderous Jordan Chase. In the Barrel Girls case, Debra lets her personal feelings lead her instincts once she concludes that vigilantes are more than just a theory. Debra closes in on Jordan after receiving a tip about his whereabouts.
