= Lumen Pierce =

Fictional character from the television series Dexter

- Dexter character
- Julia Stiles as Lumen Pierce
- First appearance: "Practically Perfect"; October 10, 2010
- Last appearance: "The Big One"; December 12, 2010
- Created by: Chip Johannessen
- Portrayed by: Julia Stiles

In-universe information
- Full name: Lumen Ann Pierce
- Gender: Female
- Significant others: Owen (ex-fiancé); Dexter Morgan (ex-boyfriend)

Lumen Ann Pierce is a fictional character portrayed by Julia Stiles in the Showtime television series Dexter. Lumen is introduced in season 5, episode "Practically Perfect", as a survivor of serial killer Boyd Fowler. She remains for the rest of the season, and leaves following the season 5 finale, "The Big One".

In season 5, episode 5, "First Blood", Lumen is revealed to have been beaten and gang raped by a group of men, including Boyd Fowler. She witnesses Dexter Morgan kill Fowler, and thus becomes a key player in Dexter's life. Dexter rescues her, but initially thinks he has no choice but to kill her in order to eliminate a witness. He eventually decides to spare her life, however. To earn Lumen's trust, Dexter shows her the fate of Fowler's dead victims, tells her he saved her from the same fate, and confides his wife Rita was murdered by someone like Fowler.

Lumen asks Dexter to help her seek revenge against her abusers. He initially refuses, but after Lumen continues on her own and targets the wrong suspect, Dexter intervenes to teach her the importance of knowing a person is guilty before killing them. He entreats her to leave Miami; she agrees at first, but decides to stay after a pat-down at the airport triggers traumatic memories of her abuse. She goes out on her own and shoots one of her attackers, but panics, not knowing what to do with his body; she calls Dexter, who reluctantly helps her cover up the murder. That night, she tells him that killing the man brought her a sense of peace that she knows will not last; she believes she will have to kill all of her attackers to get over her abuse for good. Dexter realizes that she harbors a "Dark Passenger" much like his own, and agrees to help, in part to find his own closure following Rita's murder. The two then systematically hunt down and kill Lumen's abusers, and in the process become lovers. Lumen leaves Dexter in the season finale, however, after realizing she no longer feels the need to kill.

== Development ==
Lumen was created by new showrunner Chip Johannessen for the fifth season of Dexter. Lumen is portrayed by actress Julia Stiles. She originally signed on to appear in ten episodes of the series. In casting the role, producers were looking for someone with a vulnerable side. It was confirmed shortly before production that Stiles was in the final stages of appearance negotiations for a major role in the fifth season of Dexter. Showtime confirmed on June 7, 2010 that Stiles would appear on the show. They originally gave this character description: "She'll play a "mysterious young woman who forms a unique relationship" with the titular character, played by Golden Globe and SAG-winning actor Michael C. Hall."

The fifth season finale, "The Big One", marked the conclusion of the season-long subplot of Lumen seeking revenge against Jordan Chase (Jonny Lee Miller) and his accomplices, and marked the last in a string of regular guest appearances by Stiles and Miller. Stiles said at the start of her time on the series, she believed Lumen would likely be killed by the end of the season because most characters who have learned the truth about Dexter's double life have ended up dead. The actress said she never predicted that Lumen would break up with Dexter, and she found that scene difficult to perform, due to the level of intimacy the two characters had built up throughout the season. She prepared herself for the scene by focusing on the fact that Lumen was healed and the reality of the murders she committed with Dexter had sunk in. Stiles said she found Lumen's repudiation of Dexter particularly sad because she knew more about his darker side than anyone else, which meant her breakup was a rejection of him as a person.

== Arc ==
Lumen is first seen in the series after witnessing Dexter Morgan (Michael C. Hall) kill Boyd Fowler (Shawn Hatosy), a serial killer who had been keeping her captive. While it is extremely inconvenient for Dexter to leave a witness alive, Lumen does not fit Dexter's "code", and so he is morally obligated to keep her alive. He keeps her locked up in a secluded area until he figures out what to do. At first, Lumen is terrified of Dexter, believing he will kill her for witnessing his crime. She tries to escape, but Dexter catches her and shows her the bodies of Fowler's previous victims. He assures her that had he not killed Fowler, she would also have been murdered. Lumen then confides in Dexter and tells him that Fowler was not the only one to hurt her; it is ultimately revealed that she had been held captive for about a month and was repeatedly raped and tortured by five men.

Obsessed with revenge, she attempts to enlist Dexter's help to hunt down the remaining perpetrators. He is unwilling to help her at first, and urges her to leave Miami and return home. Dexter goes to Lumen's motel room and discovers she had been tracking down her abusers. He tries to spare her the experience of killing by hunting down a registered sex offender he believes to have been one of the perpetrators, but learns that the man is innocent and lets him go.

Unable to bring herself to leave Miami, Lumen finds and shoots Dan Mendell (Sean O'Bryan), one of her rapists. She calls Dexter, who reluctantly helps track down the wounded Mendell and cautions her about killing the wrong person. Mendell pleads his innocence at first, but then calls his co-conspirators on Lumen's cell phone, confirming her suspicion and prompting Dexter to kill him. They later meet at Dexter's house, where Lumen reveals that Mendell's death brought her a fleeting sense of peace, and the only way to find that peace again is to kill her other tormentors. Dexter recognizes this need as her "Dark Passenger" and finally agrees to help her.

Lumen turns up at the crime scene where Fowler's stocked and preserved victims are revealed from a traffic crash. There, she is spotted by Detective Joey Quinn (Desmond Harrington), who asks disgraced cop Stan Liddy (Peter Weller) to look into her and Dexter. She identifies Cole Harmon (Chris Vance), head of security for self-help guru Jordan Chase (Jonny Lee Miller), as one of her rapists and saves Dexter from a surprise attack by Harmon. Setting up base at the hotel where Chase is giving his seminar, she helps Dexter set up and prepare for the kill. Harmon spots her in the lobby and chases her; Dexter barely manages to save her. Unable to extract any information, Lumen watches while Dexter kills him. While they dump the body, Liddy photographs them going out on Dexter's boat.

After the police uncover DVDs of the men torturing and raping their victims, Dexter switches Lumen's DVD with a scratched and empty one. He then brings it to Lumen, who is afraid and ashamed at the prospect that the police and Dexter watched it. Dexter assures her that no one has seen it. Lumen then acknowledges that she knows what a risk he is taking by being with her, before tearfully telling him that he has been her only way through this. She then forces herself to watch her own rape, as Dexter listens from another room, clearly disturbed by what he hears. Lumen proves instrumental in getting information from Emily Birch (Angela Bettis), the first victim of Chase's gang and only other known survivor. This leads them to Alex Tilden (Scott Grimes), the first target. Tilden becomes Lumen's first victim, as Dexter allows her to deliver the killing blow at her request. Afterward, they return to Dexter's apartment, where they sleep together. As they lie in each other's arms, Dexter reflects that she is the first person to truly see him for who he is and accept him for it.

As Lumen and Dexter begin to plan how they will capture Chase, they realize they are being watched. Once Dexter determines that they are under police surveillance, he attempts to convince Lumen to leave Miami for her own safety. However, Lumen refuses to abandon him, and Dexter ultimately admits that he wants her to stay.

After receiving a distressed call from Emily, who says Chase contacted and threatened her, Lumen goes to Emily's house to reassure her, after unsuccessfully attempting to contact Dexter. This turns out to be a trap meant for Lumen and Dexter, however, and Chase kidnaps Lumen after murdering Emily. Dexter arrives later and can see that Lumen put up a fight, albeit unsuccessfully, and swears that he will not lose Lumen, too. After Dexter shows up to rescue Lumen, she finally kills Chase. After she and Dexter dispose of Chase's body, she admits to Dexter that she did not think they would be able to pull it off, describing it as a miracle. The next day, she regretfully tells Dexter she has to leave Miami; her "Dark Passenger" has left her, and she no longer feels the need to kill. She tells Dexter that she does not want to leave but has to, because his "Dark Passenger" will never leave him. Dexter ultimately understands, tells her she should not be sorry that her darkness has left her, and promises that he will carry her darkness as well as his own.

== Reception ==
Many critics have responded well to Stiles's portrayal of the character — so much so that her exit in "The Big One" was not well received. Matt Fowler of IGN said, "Having her leave was, unfortunately, inevitable and it meant that we had to sit through her explain the reason for her wanting to leave Dexter, which to us was a little plodding because we knew that it was all a way of getting her off the show when it felt so much more right, story-wise, for her character to want to stay. No, Dexter and Lumen's romance wasn't the true seller here, but it did fit within their vigilante partnership. And it seems like something that she wouldn't want to give up. I did appreciate Dexter's anger when he came to the sad realization that he was "forever broken, with an inner eternal dark flame."

For her performance, Stiles was nominated for the Golden Globe Award for Best Supporting Actress – Series, Miniseries or Television Film and the Primetime Emmy Award for Outstanding Guest Actress in a Drama Series.
