= April Lee Hernández =

American actress (born 1980)

April Lee Hernandez
- Born: January 31, 1980 (age 46); New York City, U.S.
- Other names: April L. Hernandez; April Hernandez-Castillo
- Occupation: Actress
- Years active: 2003–present
- Spouse: José Castillo
- Children: 1

April Lee Hernandez (born January 31, 1980) is an American film and television actress. She has also been credited as April L. Hernandez and April Hernandez-Castillo.

== Career ==
Aside from performing stand-up comedy, she has also appeared in several commercials, as well as on the television series ER, Law & Order, and 30 Rock. In June 2010 she was cast for the American cult series Dexter. She appeared in the television series Person of Interest episode "Legacy", which aired on January 18, 2012, in which she played an attorney who had turned her life around after a checkered childhood.

She is known for her role in the 2007 drama Freedom Writers, in which she played Eva, based on real-life high school student Maria Reyes.

== Personal life ==
Hernandez is married to Jose Castillo. The couple have a daughter named Summer Rose, who is best known for playing Alma Rivera from Alma's Way. Summer was born on September 30, 2012.

== Filmography ==
=== Film ===
Year	Title	Role	Notes
2003	Big Wes	Reina	Short
2007	Freedom Writers	Eva Benitez	
2008	Broken	Mara	Short
2009	The Big Wes	Reina	
2012	The History of Future Folk	Carmen	
2013	Officer Down	Coraline	
2015	The Stockroom	Tina	

=== Television ===
Year	Title	Role	Notes
2004	Law & Order	Shayna Rosario	"Can I Get a Witness?"
2005	Jonny Zero	Salome	"No Good Deed", "La Familia"
2005	Blind Justice	Cindy	"Seoul Man"
2005–06	ER	Nurse Inez	Recurring role
2007	30 Rock	Vikki	"Black Tie"
2009	Nurse Jackie	Beth	"Pilot"
2009	Rescue Me	Marla	"Drink"
2010	Dexter	Off. Cira Manzon	Recurring role
2011	East WillyB	Maggie	"You've Been Served", "Baseball's Dead"
2012	Person of Interest	Andrea Gutierrez	"Legacy"
2014	Black Box	Elmira Villetti	"Exceptional or Dead"
2015	Law & Order: Special Victims Unit	Sonya Amaro	"Padre Sandunguero"
2015	The Following	Louise	"Boxed In", "Exposed"
2016	Elementary	Roxanne Ortiz	"Ain't Nothing Like the Real Thing"
2016	Feed the Beast	Blanca Herrera	"Father of the Year", "Screw You, Randy", "Secret Sauce"
2020	New Amsterdam	Domonique	"Code Silver"
2021	Prodigal Son	Marshal Emily Ruiz	"You Can Run...", "Sun and Fun", "The Last Weekend"
