= Dexter season 8 =

Drama series

Dexter
- Season 8
- DVD cover
- Showrunner: Scott Buck
- Starring: Michael C. Hall; Jennifer Carpenter; Desmond Harrington; C. S. Lee; David Zayas; Aimee Garcia; Geoff Pierson; James Remar
- No. of episodes: 12

Release
- Original network: Showtime
- Original release: June 30 – September 22, 2013

Season chronology
- ← Previous; Season 7

The eighth and final season of the Showtime drama series Dexter premiered on June 30, 2013, and concluded on September 22 of the same year. The season follows Dexter Morgan, who is forced to deal with his past when he comes across Dr. Evelyn Vogel, an expert on psychiatry who returns to Miami. Nicknamed the Psychopath Whisperer, she claims to have structured the code for him alongside Harry. This season also deals with a new serial killer in Miami who removes pieces of the victims' brains, and with Debra, who is trying to deal with her actions in the previous season. Originally serving as the final season, Dexter returned as a limited series in 2021, titled Dexter: New Blood.

== Cast ==
=== Main ===
- Michael C. Hall as Dexter Morgan
- Jennifer Carpenter as Debra Morgan
- Desmond Harrington as Joey Quinn
- C. S. Lee as Vince Masuka
- David Zayas as Angel Batista
- Aimee Garcia as Jamie Batista
- Geoff Pierson as Deputy Chief Tom Matthews
- James Remar as Harry Morgan

=== Special guest stars ===
- Charlotte Rampling as Dr. Evelyn Vogel
- Yvonne Strahovski as Hannah McKay

=== Recurring ===
- Sean Patrick Flanery as Jacob Elway
- Dora Madison Burge as Niki Walters
- Dana L. Wilson as Det. Angie Miller
- Darri Ingolfsson as Oliver Saxon/Daniel Vogel
- Bethany Joy Lenz as Cassie Jollenston
- Sam Underwood as Zach Hamilton
- Kenny Johnson as U.S. Marshal Max Clayton
- Scott Michael Morgan as Lyle Sussman
- John D'Aquino as Ed Hamilton
- Nick Gomez as Javier Guzman/El Sapo
- Aaron McCusker as A.J. Yates
- Valerie Cruz as Sylvia Prado
- Nicole LaLiberte as Arlene Schram

=== Guest stars ===
- Rhys Coiro as Andrew Briggs
- Barbara Tarbuck as Ms. Sussman
- Rebecca Staab as Lucy Gerard
- Andrew Elvis Miller as Ron Galuzzo
- Rolando Molina as Armando
- David Chisum as Kevin Wyman
- Julian Sands as Miles Castner

== Production ==
On March 1, 2013, Jennifer Carpenter reported on her Twitter that Michael C. Hall would be directing the second episode of season 8, which was his directing debut.

On April 18, 2013, Showtime officially announced that the eighth season would be the show's last.

On May 9, 2013, the official Dexter Facebook fanpage posted a behind the scenes photo of a clapper showing that episode 6 of season 8 would be directed by John Dahl.

== Episodes ==
No. overall	No. in season	Title	Directed by	Written by	Original release date	U.S. viewers (millions)
85	1	"A Beautiful Day"	Keith Gordon	Scott Buck	June 30, 2013	2.48
Six months after killing LaGuerta, a shattered and guilt-ridden Debra has quit her job at Miami Metro and joined a private investigation company, run by Jacob Elway (Sean Patrick Flannery). Deb abuses prescription medications and even cocaine while working undercover to bring in Andrew Briggs (Rhys Coiro), who has stolen jewels from the mob. In LaGuerta's absence, Batista has returned from retirement and become Lieutenant. Miami Metro investigates a new serial killer, the "Brain Surgeon", who takes melon ball size scoops of brain tissue from his victims. The MMPD receives help from psychopath expert Evelyn Vogel (Charlotte Rampling), who also appears to have a keen interest in Dexter. Dexter tracks down Debra and asks her why she's been avoiding him. Debra tells Dexter she hates herself because of him. Dexter starts to spiral out of control, choking someone in road rage. Quinn and Jamie have begun a relationship, which Quinn wants to keep secret from Batista. Dexter tracks down Debra again and says Briggs is being targeted by El Sapo, a mob hitman, but she doesn't care. Briggs returns and Dexter and Briggs fight, with Dexter stabbing Briggs to death with a nearby knife. Debra throws out Dexter and calls police. She finds a safe deposit key on Briggs' keychain that could lead to the stolen jewels, which have a recovery reward that would partially go to Debra. Debra doesn't notice El Sapo following her from the crime scene. Vogel confronts Dexter with murderous drawings from his childhood, and reveals that she knows about Harry's Code.
86	2	"Every Silver Lining..."	Michael C. Hall	Manny Coto	July 7, 2013	2.52
Vogel reveals to Dexter that she helped Harry create his Code, harboring a perverse interest and admiration for psychopaths. Vogel and Harry, Dexter's father, worked together to develop and shape Dexter's upbringing. Vogel asks Dexter to track down the Brain Surgeon, whom she believes to be one of her former patients and a grave hazard to her life. While tracking down the stolen jewels from the Briggs murder, Debra finds the jewels but El Sapo steals them and beats her badly. Later El Sapo is found shot to death. Another victim of the Brain Surgeon is found, just as Vogel predicted, with the same brain removal. Quinn and Jamie argue over Quinn's future and Batista's involvement in their relationship. At the El Sapo crime scene, Dexter finds traces of the perpetrator's blood and secretly takes it. Dexter tracks down one of Vogel's patients, Lyle Sussman, who he believes is the Brain Surgeon, but discovers he has been murdered. Later Dexter discovers it's Debra's blood at the El Sapo crime scene, and removes Debra from a horrifying interrogation about the murder. Dexter agrees to hide Debra's involvement in the El Sapo shooting from the police. Vogel and Dexter find a DVD from the Brain Surgeon, showing the killer forcing Sussman at gunpoint to do his bidding. Dexter agrees to track down the killer from Vogel's list of suspects.
87	3	"What's Eating Dexter Morgan?"	Ernest Dickerson	Lauren Gussis	July 14, 2013	2.43
Debra gets caught drunk driving. Quinn helps Debra out at 4AM, lying to Jamie, and gets the charges dropped. The police find Sussman's body no longer on a hook but now arranged to look like a suicide. Dexter knows this is to throw the police off the trail. And it works, as Miami Metro triumphantly closes the Brain Surgeon case. However, the real Brain Surgeon leaves disturbing trophies on Vogel's doorstep for "His" and "Hers". Dexter pursues another of Vogel's former patients, Ron Galuzzo, who sells workout equipment at the mall. Vogel finds Dexter's love for Debra unusual and questions why Dexter didn't kill her when she discovered his secret, implying that he is not a "perfect" psychopath. Debra sloppily acquires a new client at work. Quinn's preoccupation with Debra and lying about why he left at 4AM causes friction between himself and Jamie, and Batista begins to lose faith in Quinn's ability to pass the sergeant's exam. Dexter learns that Galuzzo is a cannibal, and Galuzzo's job helps find the most fit victims to target. Dexter tries to convince Debra she's still a good person but after her work client wouldn't see the obvious evidence of adultery in front of her, Debra spirals out of control and drunkenly tries to confess to killing LaGuerta to Quinn. Quinn calls Dexter and he quickly arrives with Vogel. Debra goes berserk and in desperation Dexter injects her unconscious. Vogel grabs Debra's written confession just in time. Dexter kills Galuzzo.
88	4	"Scar Tissue"	Stefan Schwartz	Tim Schlattmann	July 21, 2013	2.47
Debra and Vogel work through LaGuerta's murder, but Debra still struggles to cope. Quinn finds out he aced the Sergeant test from Batista. Vogel tells Dexter he might not have Debra in his life anymore. Dexter searches for the next potential killer on Vogel's list, A.J. Yates. Sneaking inside Yates' residence, Dexter doesn't know he's actually under surveillance from Yates' cameras. Dexter calls Vogel about suspicious evidence as Yates overhears. Below the house Yates has a female prisoner tied up. Quinn fights with Debra's DUI arresting officer, angering Batista on Quinn's behavior as he's nominating him for Sergeant (who Matthews doesn't want). Dexter meets his new neighbor, Cassie, who is attracted to mysterious men. Masuka has an awkward encounter with Niki, a 20-year-old, who claims to be his biological daughter via artificial insemination. Dexter returns to Yates' residence and finds the hidden entrance and proof he is the Brain Surgeon. Instead of Yates he finds the female prisoner stabbed and rescues her. Dexter finds out that Vogel is keeping notes on her interaction with him. Debra learns of Harry's suicide over Dexter's nature. Dexter uses Yates' ailing father to lure him, but Yates escapes after putting his father in danger. After confirming Harry's suicide, Debra grabs the wheel and tries to kill herself and Dexter, driving off the road into a lake. After being rescued Debra sees Dexter drowning and swims back to save him.
89	5	"This Little Piggy"	Romeo Tirone	Scott Reynolds	July 28, 2013	2.55
Vogel tries to reconcile Dexter and Debra's differences in therapy, but Dexter walks out. Miami Metro PD steps up its investigation of Norma Rivera's murder; they target her millionaire boss, Ed Hamilton, with whom she was having an affair. Matthews pressures Quinn to overlook Hamilton. After they visit Hamilton he provides an alibi but they find a witness who saw the son, Zach, near the scene. Dexter suspects Zach is the real killer after the witness later recants, likely paid off by the family. Police investigate Yates' home and find his underground lair and multiple graves on the property. Yates broke each victim's toes, one week at a time, before finally murdering them. Masuka asks Debra to do a background check on Niki, who claims to be his daughter. Yates abducts Vogel; Dexter and Debra reconcile as they work together to find her. Vogel manages to call Dexter, and Deb traces the location. Dexter kills Yates, and brings Debra and Vogel along as he dumps the body, explaining that he considers them family, seeing Vogel as a mother figure.
90	6	"A Little Reflection"	John Dahl	Jace Richdale	August 4, 2013	2.21
Dexter investigates Zach and confirms that he murdered Norma. Vogel wants to teach Harry's Code to Zach, but Dexter is skeptical. Deb helps her boss, Elway, prove his sister's boyfriend is being unfaithful. After being denied the sergeant's position, Quinn zealously investigates Zach. Dexter captures Zach just before he kills his father, not his father's latest mistress as expected. Dexter binds Zach in a kill room. Zach confesses to killing Norma to protect his mother, whose alcoholism stems from his father's marital indiscretions. Zach's noble motives convince Dexter to let Zach go and teach him Harry's Code. Later, while eating dinner at Deb's, Debra and Dexter are drugged by Hannah McKay.
91	7	"Dress Code"	Alik Sakharov	Arika Lisanne Mittman	August 11, 2013	1.90
Waking up unharmed, Dexter and Debra believe that Hannah has sent them a message. Dexter finds Hannah's current alias and address, and learns that she is married to multimillionaire Miles Castner. Masuka learns that Niki works at a topless sports bar, so he secures her a part-time job in his lab. Zach visits the precinct with his lawyer and demands that Quinn stop following him. Quinn and Jamie decide to move in together. Hannah confesses to Dexter that she hoped he would kill Miles. Debra borrows Elway's GPS and tracks Dexter. Miles violently confronts Hannah about her meeting with Dexter, and she kills him herself. Dexter and Hannah dump the body, but Debra sees them together. Dexter is called to a crime scene in his building: Cassie has been bludgeoned, in the same fashion as Norma, and Dexter suspects Zach.
92	8	"Are We There Yet?"	Holly Dale	Wendy West	August 18, 2013	1.94
Dexter finds evidence that Zach killed Cassie. He tracks Zach to a hotel in Key West, and Hannah accompanies him. During the trip, Dexter plans to get Hannah a new identity so she can flee the country. Debra uses the GPS to follow Dexter to Key West. Dexter and Hannah realize that Zach was in Key West at the time of Cassie's death, which means that someone is trying to frame Zach. Debra tries to arrest Hannah, but stops when Hannah convinces her that she loves Dexter; however, Elway informs the authorities that Hannah may be in Miami. Back in Miami, Dexter, Hannah, and Zach have dinner with Vogel. Afterward, Dexter takes Hannah to her hotel room, where they have sex. At his apartment, Dexter finds Zach's corpse, left by the Brain Surgeon. After dumping the body, Dexter asks Hannah to stay in Miami.
93	9	"Make Your Own Kind of Music"	John Dahl	Karen Campbell	August 25, 2013	2.28
Investigating Zach's murder, Dexter finds DNA evidence and learns that the Brain Surgeon is Vogel's psychopathic son, who faked his own death years ago and changed his identity to that of a dead man, Oliver Saxon. U.S. Marshal Max Clayton (Kenny Johnson) arrives in Miami to search for Hannah, but Dexter throws him off the trail and moves Hannah to Deb's house. Deb suspects Saxon of Cassie's murder, but he goes into hiding. Debra later considers rejoining Miami Metro. Dexter lures Saxon from hiding but loses him, after which Vogel implores Dexter to let this case go. Dexter makes plans to leave Miami permanently, taking Hannah and Harrison with him, but not before finding and killing Saxon. Unbeknownst to Dexter, Saxon has reunited with Vogel, who accepts him into her home.
94	10	"Goodbye Miami"	Steve Shill	Jace Richdale & Scott Reynolds	September 8, 2013	2.34
Saxon asks Vogel to rehabilitate him, as she helped Dexter. Dexter gives Batista his 2 weeks notice, and tells Debra he's moving to Argentina with Hannah and Harrison. Clayton becomes suspicious that Dexter is leaving Miami. Debra returns to Miami Metro and rekindles her relationship with Quinn, who has broken up with Jamie. Despite her desire to help Saxon, Vogel decides to betray him after watching the video of Zach's murder. After a treadmill accident, Hannah must take Harrison to the ER, but a nurse recognizes her and puts Clayton on her trail. Vogel brings Saxon to her home, but her nervousness makes him suspicious. When Dexter arrives, Saxon murders Vogel and escapes.
95	11	"Monkey in a Box"	Ernest Dickerson	Tim Schlattmann & Wendy West	September 15, 2013	2.40
Dexter removes all of the evidence pointing to his relationship with Vogel before calling the police. Elway and Clayton suspect that Debra is harboring Hannah. Saxon offers Dexter a deal that the two will leave each other alone; Dexter agrees, but secretly plans to kill him before leaving. With a hurricane approaching Miami, Hannah goes to the airport to wait for Dexter, but she is followed by Elway. Meanwhile, Dexter captures Saxon, but realizes that he no longer has murderous urges in response to his relationship with Hannah. Instead of killing Saxon, Dexter calls Debra to arrest him, but Clayton tails Debra and unknowingly interferes. Saxon kills Clayton and escapes after shooting Debra.
96	12	"Remember the Monsters?"	Steve Shill	Scott Buck & Manny Coto	September 22, 2013	2.80
Debra is rushed to the hospital and Quinn goes with her. At the airport, Dexter, Hannah and Harrison manage to elude Elway, but they are forced to leave the airport due to the fake bomb scare that Dexter has rigged. Hannah and Harrison board a bus to the Jacksonville airport, but Elway is waiting for them. Hannah evades Elway and escapes with Harrison. Saxon goes to the hospital with the intention of killing Debra, but Dexter spots him and he is arrested by Angel. After successful surgery, Debra suffers a massive stroke from a blood clot, leaving her brain dead. Later, Dexter meets Saxon in his cell and provokes him to stab him with a pen. Dexter retaliates and kills him by puncturing his carotid artery with the pen. Angel and Quinn question Dexter about Saxon's killing and, although they suspect what really happened, conclude that Dexter acted in self-defense. Dexter returns to the hospital during the evacuation and takes Debra off life support. He takes her body out to sea and drops it into the water. Once her body is gone, Dexter drives his boat into the hurricane in an apparent suicide attempt. A few days later in Buenos Aires, Hannah reads of Dexter's death. However, Dexter is revealed to have faked his death, and is now living under an assumed identity, working for a lumber company in Oregon.

== Reception ==
According to Metacritic, the early response to Season 8 was mostly positive, the first two episodes of the season received a score of 71 out of 100. Roughly halfway through the season, Rolling Stone opined that Dexter is still "cleverly written and has a core cast of characters we care for", concluding that "everyone's favorite serial killer still has some gas left in his tank". However, as the season went on, reception dropped drastically. The post-season reception was extremely negative. IGN gave the season as a whole a 5.5, citing poor writing and the ending as two of the reasons for its poor quality. The A.V. Club gave the season as a whole a D−.

=== Series finale episode ===
The series finale met a mixed and polarized response, although the majority opinion was negative. Mary McNamara of the Los Angeles Times praised Carpenter's performance as worthy of an Emmy nomination and argued that "the parting scenes between Dexter and Deb, possibly the most powerful sibling bond television has ever seen, gave the show the send-off it deserved". Mike Hale of The New York Times said he "bought the ending", and fans "may or may not think that Dexter's final resting place is the one he deserves. But it works". Entertainment Weekly championed the series finale as "the best Dexter episode in years. ... It was also one of the strangest episodes in the show's history ... It's like watching a different series, one that was more compelling than the show it served to close."

Other responses to the finale were strongly negative. Joshua Alston of The A.V. Club gave the episode an "F" and argued that the writers botched "the landing" by choosing ambiguity to avoid the conflict of "whether or not [fans] wanted Dexter to get away with it." Frazier Moore of the Associated Press called the ending sappy, sloppy, and a "cop-out". Richard Lawson of The Atlantic Monthly described the finale as an "unbelievably unsatisfying end [which] ruins all that came before it", including Dexter's universally acclaimed seasons 1–4.

Showtime president David Nevins praised the series finale, defending it against fan backlash by saying: "The fundamental design of where they ended Dexter was really well conceived. He had to sacrifice the one person who was closest to him in the world, and he had to leave. That was where it was headed for a very long time." Nevins also said there were never any discussions to kill off Dexter, and they didn't just keep the character alive for a potential spinoff series, which as of January 2014 they were discussing making. In October 2020, it was announced that Dexter would return with a 10-episode limited series starring Michael C. Hall reprising his role with Clyde Phillips as showrunner.
