= A Little Reflection =

- Dexter episode
- Episode no.: Season 8 Episode 6
- Directed by: John Dahl
- Written by: Jace Richdale
- Cinematography by: Jeffrey Jur
- Editing by: Keith Henderson
- Original release date: August 4, 2013
- Running time: 55 minutes

Guest appearances
- Charlotte Rampling as Dr. Evelyn Vogel (special guest star); Sean Patrick Flanery as Jacob Elway; Bethany Joy Lenz as Cassie Jollenston; Sam Underwood as Zach Hamilton; Dora Madison Burge as Niki Walters; John D'Aquino as Ed Hamilton; Darri Ingólfsson as Oliver Saxon; David Chisum as Kevin Wyman; Yvonne Strahovski as Hannah McKay

Episode chronology
← Previous "This Little Piggy"	Next → "Dress Code"
- Dexter season 8

"A Little Reflection" is the sixth episode of the eighth season of the American crime drama television series Dexter. It is the 90th overall episode of the series and was written by executive producer Jace Richdale, and directed by John Dahl. It originally aired on Showtime on August 4, 2013.

Set in Miami, the series centers on Dexter Morgan, a forensic technician specializing in bloodstain pattern analysis for the fictional Miami Metro Police Department, who leads a secret parallel life as a vigilante serial killer, hunting down murderers who have not been adequately punished by the justice system due to corruption or legal technicalities. In the episode, Dexter begins to follow Zach, while Debra helps Elway with a special assignment.

According to Nielsen Media Research, the episode was seen by an estimated 2.21 million household viewers and gained a 1.1 ratings share among adults aged 18–49. The episode received mixed reviews from critics; while critics expressed surprise with the ending, the main storylines received mixed reactions.

== Plot ==
Dexter (Michael C. Hall) suspects Zach (Sam Underwood) might be involved in Norma Rivera's murder, but he still lacks evidence to back it up. He later finds that Vogel (Charlotte Rampling) has taken Zach as a patient, after Ed (John D'Aquino) express concern over his son's behavior. Vogel does not plan to divulge information about Zach, and wants Dexter to stay out of it.

After providing information to Masuka (C. S. Lee) about Niki (Dora Madison Burge), Debra (Jennifer Carpenter) is asked by Elway (Sean Patrick Flanery) to investigate his sister's boyfriend, Kevin Wyman (David Chisum), whom he suspects is unfaithful. When there is a lack of progress, Debra decides to change clothing so she can seduce Kevin herself. Kevin falls for the trick and tries to kiss her, until Elway punches him and orders him to call off his relationship with his sister, threatening to send her a video of their encounter. Elway's sister breaks up with Kevin, but Elway feels guilty when he believes he is to blame.

When Zach shows up at another crime to photograph, Dexter invites him to check the body, which fascinates Zach. Zach invites Dexter to his studio, which is filled with photos with a blood theme. Matthews (Geoff Pierson) wants Angel (David Zayas) to finally decide who will become Sergeant; Matthews wants Angie Miller (Dana L. Wilson) for her high-level work, while Angel believes Quinn (Desmond Harrington) can be useful in the streets. Under pressure, Angel tells Quinn that he chose Miller, angering Quinn, who feels he wasted his time. Not having to follow Matthews' instructions anymore, Quinn decides to follow Zach, and Dexter offers himself to accompany him so he can check on him. Later, Dexter sneaks into the studio to find a picture of a woman Zach was stalking, and discovers photos of Zach at Norma's crime scene with a weapon, finally realizing he killed her.

Dexter brings the evidence to Vogel, but discovers that Zach confessed to the murder on his first session with Vogel. She does not plan to give him to the police, and is also considering teaching him the Code of Harry. Dexter leaves to join Jamie (Aimee Garcia) at her birthday party. He sees that Cassie (Bethany Joy Lenz) is now hanging out with a man, Oliver Saxon (Darri Ingólfsson). Dexter later stalks Zach, who is following the woman to a yacht club. Ed suddenly is seen kissing her, and Dexter realizes that Zach is actually going after his father. Before he can confront him, he sedates Zach, avoiding Quinn in the process. He takes him to his kill table, where Zach confesses that Ed's affairs have caused his mother's health to deteriorate and hoped that killing him would stop it. He also confesses that he feels drawn to murder, intriguing Dexter. He sets him free, planning to teach him the Code of Harry. While eating with Debra at her house, Dexter discovers that their drinks have been drugged. As they begin to lose consciousness, Hannah (Yvonne Strahovski) enters the room.

== Production ==
=== Development ===
The episode was written by executive producer Jace Richdale, and directed by John Dahl. This was Richdale's fifth writing credit, and Dahl's 15th directing credit.

== Reception ==
=== Viewers ===
In its original American broadcast, "A Little Reflection" was seen by an estimated 2.21 million household viewers with a 1.1 in the 18–49 demographics. This means that 1.1 percent of all households with televisions watched the episode. This was a 14% decrease in viewership from the previous episode, which was watched by an estimated 2.55 million household viewers with a 1.2 in the 18–49 demographics.

=== Critical reviews ===
"A Little Reflection" received mixed reviews from critics. Matt Fowler of IGN gave the episode a "good" 7.4 out of 10, and wrote, "Anyhow, Hannah being back, and drugging Dexter and Deb, was a great ending to what was an underwhelming episode. "Remember me?" Hannah taunted, despite the fact that I'm pretty sure, after only six or seven months, Dexter remembers her. But other than that final moment, "A Little Reflection" was kind of bereft. It started up a whole new final season arc, and one that I'm not too crazy about. On top of that, the strife between Deb and Dexter was mostly gone, leaving the show with a lot of time to fill. So more space was given now to the freakin' "sergeant promotion" storyline - which seems to mostly involve Batista peering out of his office window, shifting his eyes back and forth between Quinn and Miller."

Joshua Alston of The A.V. Club gave the episode a "C+" grade and wrote, "The final season of Dexter is ambling, taking its sweet time to ratchet up the tension, and as much as I'd love the writers to pull off a spectacular ending to the show, at this point I'm starting not to care about where the show ends up, as much as I care how quickly it gets there. The pace simply isn't nimble enough."

Richard Rys of Vulture gave the episode a 4 star rating out of 5 and wrote, "So you know how last week's episode felt a little slow, like a bit of a detour from this otherwise fast-paced and intense season? Problem solved. This one had a bit of everything — Dexter being funny, Dexter being awkward, Dexter wrapping someone in plastic, quality time with Deb and Vogel, a twist at the end, and the much-anticipated return of Hotstuff McPoisonyoass." Kevin Fitzpatrick of ScreenCrush wrote, "Hooray, Hannah's back! As awkwardly staged a reintroduction thought that might have been. Indeed, we'd been worried that the apparent resolution of the Brain Surgeon case and the shift toward Dexter's relationship with Zach Hamilton might have taken the wind out of the sails, so to speak, it seems the second half of Dexter's final season is wasting no time with plot developments to keep things moving."

James Hibberd of Entertainment Weekly wrote, "It was a somewhat sleepy episode (at least, until the very end when Hannah McKay did a pop-in), despite having my favorite Dexter director (John Dahl) at the helm. I was told by an insider that this season will get moving faster soon, and that the home stretch is great." Cory Barker of TV.com wrote, "I'll be the first to admit that I've been wishy-washy about this season of Dexter, but that's only because it's been too uneven and too confounding. "A Little Reflection" felt pretty familiar for the majority of its running time, but there were still elements that suggest the show is moving toward something, as opposed to stalling. Here's hoping."

Andrea Reiher of Zap2it wrote, "this entirely lovely familial episode ends with flipping Hannah showing back up, having poisoned Dexter and Deb for whatever nefarious thing she's up to. This can't be good." Alan Danzis of BuddyTV wrote, "It's an intriguing idea for the show Dexter to explore in its final season, but it also feels like ground we've covered before, not helped by the fact that Zach is played by a fairly benign, slightly boring actor. This episode, like many this season, also has a number of other fairly uninteresting plotlines that might become moot by the cliffhanger."

Nick Harley of Den of Geek gave the episode a 2 star rating out of 5 and wrote, "I was very disappointed last week to see the main storyline that had been brewing come to an early close, and I'm even sadder to see the new direction that they're heading in with Dexter and Zach. We’ve seen plenty of Dexter sidekicks in the show's run and it's no longer exciting to watch Dexter team up with another would-be psycho." Miranda Wicker of TV Fanatic gave the episode a 3.5 star rating out of 5 and wrote, "The shining moments from "A Little Reflection" were perhaps more abundant than last week, but too many competing stories detract from what should be the focus of Dexter's final season: Dexter himself." Television Without Pity gave the episode a "B+" grade.
