= Goodbye Miami =

- Dexter episode
- Episode no.: Season 8 Episode 10
- Directed by: Steve Shill
- Written by: Jace Richdale; Scott Reynolds
- Cinematography by: Jeffrey Jur
- Editing by: Louis Cioffi
- Original release date: September 8, 2013
- Running time: 53 minutes

Guest appearances
- Yvonne Strahovski as Hannah McKay (special guest star); Charlotte Rampling as Dr. Evelyn Vogel (special guest star); Sean Patrick Flanery as Jacob Elway; Kenny Johnson as Max Clayton; Dora Madison Burge as Niki Walters; Darri Ingólfsson as Oliver Saxon

Episode chronology
← Previous "Make Your Own Kind of Music"	Next → "Monkey in a Box"
- Dexter season 8

"Goodbye Miami" is the tenth episode of the eighth season of the American crime drama television series Dexter. It is the 94th overall episode of the series and was written by executive producer Jace Richdale and supervising producer Scott Reynolds, and directed by Steve Shill. It originally aired on Showtime on September 8, 2013.

Set in Miami, the series centers on Dexter Morgan, a forensic technician specializing in bloodstain pattern analysis for the fictional Miami Metro Police Department, who leads a secret parallel life as a vigilante serial killer, hunting down murderers who have not been adequately punished by the justice system due to corruption or legal technicalities. In the episode, Dexter tries to convince Vogel in letting him kill Saxon, while Hannah hides in Debra's house to avoid authorities.

According to Nielsen Media Research, the episode was seen by an estimated 2.34 million household viewers and gained a 1.1 ratings share among adults aged 18–49. The episode received mixed reviews from critics, who criticized the characters' actions, logic and writing.

== Plot ==
Vogel (Charlotte Rampling) makes breakfast for Saxon (Darri Ingólfsson), who remarks that she cannot refer to herself as his "mother." Vogel offers to give him the best treatment at a psychiatric institution, but Saxon refuses to go back again, also blaming her for Richard's death by ignoring him. After scolding her for prioritizing Dexter (Michael C. Hall) over him, he leaves her house.

Dexter leaves Harrison with Hannah (Yvonne Strahovski), preparing to start a new life with them in Argentina. Before they leave, Dexter wants to wrap some things up, which includes killing Saxon. He reveals his plans to Debra (Jennifer Carpenter), who does not like the idea. Dexter privately informs Angel (David Zayas) of his decision, who states Dexter will always be welcome if he returns. Dexter continues investigating Saxon's background, finding that he has moved across many countries for years, suggesting he continued his killing spree after escaping the facility. He wants Vogel to help catch him, but she feels guilt for sending her son away and cannot turn against him.

Saxon gets Vogel to accompany him to an abandoned hospital, which Saxon has set to look like his psychiatric institution. Saxon explains that he wants her to help him find a feasible life as a serial killer, just like she helped Dexter. Vogel states she will do it, and they share a hug. During this, Dexter breaks into Vogel's computer to get access to Saxon's files, which includes footage of the murders of Zach and Sussman. He shows Zach's murder to Vogel, who is horrified and finally agrees to his idea of killing Saxon. Quinn (Desmond Harrington) breaks up with Jamie (Aimee Garcia); while she believes it is due to Debra, Quinn claims that's not the case. Due to a lack of progress in finding Hannah, Clayton (Kenny Johnson) informs Angel that he will leave and close the investigation. During their conversation, he learns that Dexter is going to leave work.

Debra informs Elway (Sean Patrick Flanery) that she is quitting his company, planning to move back to Miami Metro. When Jamie insults her for causing Quinn to break up with her, Debra asks him about it, and they end up kissing. Debra tells Hannah to stay hidden at her house, even with Clayton stopping his investigation. However, Harrison falls off a treadmill, injuring his chin, forcing her to take him to the hospital. A nurse recognizes her, and Clayton finds that she signed with Debra's name. Dexter goes to Vogel's house when Saxon visits her, who notes that she is afraid. When Dexter arrives, he is called by Saxon, who is seen in the window with Vogel. Saxon slits her throat and flees the scene. Vogel dies, and a shaken Dexter holds her body in his arms.

== Production ==
=== Development ===
The episode was written by executive producer Jace Richdale and supervising producer Scott Reynolds, and directed by Steve Shill. This was Richdale's sixth writing credit, Reynolds' 11th writing credit, and Shill's 12th directing credit.

== Reception ==
=== Viewers ===
In its original American broadcast, "Goodbye Miami" was seen by an estimated 2.34 million household viewers with a 1.1 in the 18–49 demographics. This means that 1.1 percent of all households with televisions watched the episode. This was a slight increase in viewership from the previous episode, which was watched by an estimated 2.28 million household viewers with a 1.1 in the 18–49 demographics.

=== Critical reviews ===
"Goodbye Miami" received mixed reviews from critics. Matt Fowler of IGN gave the episode a "good" 7.3 out of 10, and wrote, ""Goodbye Miami" spun its wheels a lot before finally landing on the fact that Vogel made a grave error in wanting to try and help Daniel. Her death was somewhat unspectacular, although it was fun to watch her, for the entire episode, act like a nervous wreck. You know, given how calm and cold she was at the beginning of the season. There was a ton of on-the-nose, to-and-fro dialogue between Dexter and Harry, repeating things we've been hearing for a while now about how Dexter can't have it all, or split his life between two worlds. But if anything - and this comes from how surprised Vogel was with Dexter's anomalous feelings - this season has taught us that monsters can have a happy ending if they choose to. But Dexter, as usual, isn't choosing to. The return of Dexter's old kill-room, complete with photos of victims, was a nice touch though. Hopefully it'll get used. Soon."

Joshua Alston of The A.V. Club gave the episode a "D+" grade and wrote, "Given the myriad of crucial flaws plaguing the final season of Dexter, it's been difficult to pick the superlative among them. But “Goodbye, Miami” solved that problem, making abundantly clear why Dexter missed its opportunity to close strong by such a wide margin. The issue is a complete absence of sensible, or even identifiable character motivations for the actions that are most central to the plot."

Richard Rys of Vulture gave the episode a 3 star rating out of 5 and wrote, "Now that he's sure to avenge Vogel's death, he seems poised for the realization that he can't run from who he really is. Good-bye, Argentina; hello, Dark Passenger." Kevin Fitzpatrick of ScreenCrush wrote, "final hours of Dexter have been positioned toward a final showdown between Dexter and an antagonist we have little regard for, while the new life in Argentina dangles too obviously as a pipe dream even Harry warns (us) might not be in the cards. Of course, nothing beyond Hannah's potential capture suggests that anything else about Dexter's secret life might come to light, placing remarkably low stakes on the climax to an unevenly-plotted season."

Jeff Jensen of Entertainment Weekly wrote, "Surely all of this will be settled once Dexter gets Oliver tethered to his kill table. If Dexter puts him through the ritual, Dexter is reinforcing Dirty Harry-Vogel Dexter. If Dexter spares him, Dexter is cleaning his slate, choosing to become a new creation of his own design. We shall see. And soon. Only two episodes left." Cory Barker of TV.com wrote, "Dexter can keep telling us that people like Vogel are important, or trying to convince us that Saxon is a worthy adversary, but by now it's absolutely clear that the show is full of empty BIG moments and toothless characters. The end is very, very near, and thank goodness for that."

Andrea Reiher of Zap2it wrote, "it isn't actually the choice to go to Vogel that is the heart of the episode. Dexter chooses to leave, once and for all, and start a life with Hannah. He's ready to quit his job, sell his condo and take off for Argentina. We hope that's how it works out." Alan Danzis of BuddyTV wrote, "At the beginning of this week's episode, we're three episodes out from the final episode of Dexter, so it's only natural that it's an hour chock full of goodbyes. Too bad most of them are for characters that haven't made much of an impression, and many of them feel like half-hearted attempts at emotional moments."

Nick Harley of Den of Geek gave the episode a 2.5 star rating out of 5 and wrote, "Dr. Vogel's throat was slit in the eleventh hour, which isn't as surprising as it should have been. If anything, I was just waiting to see what the cliffhanger would be, and I sort of guessed that this could have been it. Dexter did seem devastated at her loss, and at least he now has real motivation to make him want to stay and kill Saxon, but like I said earlier, it's just the demise of a character that we've only just met, so it really doesn't mean a whole lot. Maybe I've just lost faith in this show, but can you blame me?" Miranda Wicker of TV Fanatic gave the episode a 3 star rating out of 5 and wrote, "Save for a few key scenes, "Goodbye Miami" was a slow-moving, dialogue-heavy hour of television. Come on, Dexter, pick up the pace!"

Alex Moaba of HuffPost wrote, "The Vogel storyline has had its faults - the cheap twist that revealed her connection to the Brain Surgeon, and putting too much of the season's end-game on the shoulders of a new character chief among them - but this scene was extremely powerful." Television Without Pity gave the episode a "C" grade.
