= Make Your Own Kind of Music (disambiguation) =

"Make Your Own Kind of Music" is a song recorded by "Mama" Cass Elliot in 1969.

Make Your Own Kind of Music may also refer to:

- Make Your Own Kind of Music, a 1969 re-release of Bubblegum, Lemonade, and... Something for Mama
- Make Your Own Kind of Music (TV series), a 1971 American television series starring The Carpenters
- "Make Your Own Kind of Music" (Dexter), a 2013 episode of Dexter
