= Are We There Yet? (Dexter) =

- Dexter episode
- Episode no.: Season 8 Episode 8
- Directed by: Holly Dale
- Written by: Wendy West
- Cinematography by: Jeffrey Jur
- Editing by: Amy E. Duddleston
- Original release date: August 18, 2013
- Running time: 52 minutes

Guest appearances
- Yvonne Strahovski as Hannah McKay (special guest star); Charlotte Rampling as Dr. Evelyn Vogel (special guest star); Sean Patrick Flanery as Jacob Elway; Sam Underwood as Zach Hamilton; Dora Madison Burge as Niki Walters; Darri Ingólfsson as Oliver Saxon

Episode chronology
← Previous "Dress Code"	Next → "Make Your Own Kind of Music"
- Dexter season 8

"Are We There Yet?" is the eighth episode of the eighth season of the American crime drama television series Dexter. It is the 92nd overall episode of the series and was written by executive producer Wendy West, and directed by Holly Dale. It originally aired on Showtime on August 18, 2013.

Set in Miami, the series centers on Dexter Morgan, a forensic technician specializing in bloodstain pattern analysis for the fictional Miami Metro Police Department, who leads a secret parallel life as a vigilante serial killer, hunting down murderers who have not been adequately punished by the justice system due to corruption or legal technicalities. In the episode, Dexter and Hannah track Zach to the Key West after he is suspected of Cassie's murder, while Debra gets Elway to help her in capturing Hannah.

According to Nielsen Media Research, the episode was seen by an estimated 1.94 million household viewers and gained a 0.9 ratings share among adults aged 18–49. The episode received mixed reviews from critics, who criticized the season's pacing and storylines, with some noting the irony of the episode's title.

== Plot ==
At Cassie's crime scene, Dexter (Michael C. Hall) wonders if Zach (Sam Underwood) killed her, as the pattern is similar to Norma Rivera's murder. Masuka (C. S. Lee) suggests Cassie's date, Oliver (Darri Ingólfsson), might be responsible, but he has an alibi to support his innocence.

Dexter retrieves DNA from the crime scene, discovering that it belongs to Zach. Concluding that Zach cannot be saved, Dexter decides to kill him. Vogel (Charlotte Rampling) fails to convince Dexter to change his mind, as Dexter feels responsible for Cassie's death for not helping Zach. He tracks his credit cards to a hotel in Key West and prepares to leave. He confirms to Debra (Jennifer Carpenter) that Hannah (Yvonne Strahovski) is in Miami, but is working to get her a fake passport to leave the country. Nevertheless, Dexter asks Hannah to accompany him in his trip to Key West. Unsure if Dexter will actually get Hannah out of their lives, Debra tells Elway (Sean Patrick Flanery) that she is in the city, interesting him as there is a big reward for her capture.

At Key West, Dexter and Hannah find Zach's hotel room covered with plastic, in a similar manner to Dexter's modus operandi. Dexter awaits for Zach's arrival, holding him with a knife. Zach states he never killed Cassie, given that he has an alibi; he was stalking Shawn Decker, a man who killed two girls. He further shows Dexter and Hannah that he has Shawn's corpse in his trunk, feeling he needed to go after someone. Dexter is impressed that Zach respected the Code, and helps him dispose of the body. As Hannah cleans Zach's room, she is confronted by Debra, who followed the GPS in Dexter's car. She plans to take Hannah to the authorities, but Hannah states that despite her past, she and Dexter love each other. As Dexter arrives to solve the situation, an upset Debra leaves and argues with Elway over her future at his company. Elway contacts the authorities to warn that Hannah is in Miami.

Returning to Miami, Dexter, Hannah and Zach dine with Vogel at her house. They talk about Cassie's murder, with Dexter warning Zach that someone is framing him for the murder, possibly retrieving his blood through his damaged car handle. Subsequently, Dexter takes Hannah to a hotel room so she can board a plane a following day to leave the country, and they end up having sex. Dexter returns to his apartment, discovering that the Brain Surgeon has killed Zach in his house, while Vogel receives a jar with Zach's tissue. Dexter dumps Zach's body in the ocean. The next day, Dexter stops Hannah from leaving the country, asking her to stay in Miami.

== Production ==
=== Development ===
The episode was written by executive producer Wendy West, and directed by Holly Dale. This was West's tenth writing credit, and Dale's second directing credit.

== Reception ==
=== Viewers ===
In its original American broadcast, "Are We There Yet?" was seen by an estimated 1.94 million household viewers with a 0.9 in the 18–49 demographics. This means that 0.9 percent of all households with televisions watched the episode. This was a slight increase in viewership from the previous episode, which was watched by an estimated 1.90 million household viewers with a 0.9 in the 18–49 demographics.

=== Critical reviews ===
"Are We There Yet?" received mixed reviews from critics. Matt Fowler of IGN gave the episode a "great" 8.8 out of 10, and wrote, ""Are We There Yet?" wasn't action-heavy, and the suspense collapsed on itself halfway through when we found out that Zach was innocent, but the way it brought everyone together over dinner was nicely done. In fact, it's because of that dinner scene that I feel bad now about Zach's death. One chair's empty. Maybe Deb will actually dine with Hannah one day. Provided Hannah's not the chef. I'd like to think of this episode as a "calm before a hopeful storm." I've come to realize that the best Dexter episodes these days are ones that open up the show up to the most possibilities."

Joshua Alston of The A.V. Club gave the episode a "D+" grade and wrote, "This final season of Dexter may actually be worse than riding shotgun on an interminable road trip though, because when you're a kid, at least the frustration comes from knowing your parents know exactly how long it's going to be until the destination but refuse to tell you. If this season were a road trip and I were in the passenger seat, I wouldn't dare ask “Are we there yet,” because I'd be afraid to find out the driver was as clueless as I am." Kevin Fitzpatrick of ScreenCrush wrote, "An interesting hour for Dexter to be certain, but not the excitement we crave going into the final four episodes of the series. In other words, "Are We There Yet?""

Alan Sepinwall of HitFix wrote, "There are tweaks, like Deb deciding to leave Hannah alone for now, or the latest lab assistant being Masuka's daughter, but overall there hasn't been a sense of urgency to this season the way there was a year ago. I haven't minded much of what's happened (other than the usual mind-numbing action at Miami Metro), but mainly I'm just marking time until the finale." Richard Rys of Vulture gave the episode a 3 star rating out of 5 and wrote, "The characters aren't evolving in meaningful ways. They're more like chess pieces as we anticipate how they'll play into the final endgame."

James Hibberd of Entertainment Weekly wrote, "This week's episode is titled "Are We There Yet." Some fans have been saying exactly that about the show in recent weeks. And the first half was likewise pretty sleepy. Then four killer characters came together and Dexter got a pulse." Cory Barker of TV.com wrote, "Vogel's actions have derailed the season's best burgeoning stories or character moments. Now I'm just hoping that whatever is in store for her, or whatever is caused by her, can make up for that in the show's final four hours."

Andrea Reiher of Zap2it wrote, "Is it far-fetched that the character of Dexter has changed so dramatically over eight seasons? Can psychopaths even do that? We aren't a psychologist, we have no idea. But we enjoy it in the realm of the show because characters need to evolve and change. The show would be very boring without that." Alan Danzis of BuddyTV wrote, "One of the things that's been irksome about this final season of Dexter is how disparate and seemingly random so many of the plot lines seem to be. This week's episode, "Are We There Yet?" seems to be finally attempting to tie all of them together... but this reviewer still can wonder in frustration, "Are we there ... at the series finale ... yet?""

Nick Harley of Den of Geek gave the episode a 2.5 star rating out of 5 and wrote, "Just as I expect from latter-day Dexter, tonight's episode spurred a mixed bag of feelings from me. Tonight's episode was insanely off balanced, offering up simultaneously the worst and possible some of the best moments of the season. Best is a loaded word though, because let's face it, not much has gotten off the ground in this final season. If we can be excited for one thing at least, it's the return of foe, the Brain Surgeon (so who cares if we all knew he'd come back)." Miranda Wicker of TV Fanatic gave the episode a 4 star rating out of 5 and wrote, "The end of Dexter Season 8 - the final season of the series about everyone's favorite serial killer, is nigh. But an episode like tonight's, while a strong one, has me wondering just how it will all end for Dexter and company with so few hours remaining."

Alex Moaba of HuffPost wrote, "the title of the episode - "Are We There Yet?" - seemed to be a wink and a nod to the show's slow march to the end. We're three quarters of the way through this final Dexter season now, and it hasn't exactly been a roller coaster ride to the finish, yet. When contrasted with what Breaking Bad is doing with its final episodes on AMC, Dexter is taking its sweet time setting up its end-game." Television Without Pity wrote, "Vogel has so quickly become part of Dexter's (and Deb's) family that, at least for me, anything that affects her so deeply is going to be worth caring about. Also, now that he's back, I'd imagine the show isn't going to hold back his identity much longer, so we shouldn't have long to wait."
