= A Beautiful Day (Dexter) =

- Dexter episode
- Episode no.: Season 8 Episode 1
- Directed by: Keith Gordon
- Written by: Scott Buck
- Cinematography by: Jeffrey Jur
- Editing by: Louis Cioffi
- Original release date: June 30, 2013
- Running time: 53 minutes

Guest appearances
- Charlotte Rampling as Evelyn Vogel (special guest star); Sean Patrick Flanery as Jacob Elway; Rhys Coiro as Andrew Briggs

Episode chronology
| ← Previous "Surprise, Motherfucker!" | Next → "Every Silver Lining..." |
- Dexter season 8

"A Beautiful Day" is the first episode of the eighth season of the American crime drama television series Dexter. It is the 85th overall episode of the series and was written by executive producer Scott Buck, and directed by Keith Gordon. It originally aired on Showtime on June 30, 2013.

Set in Miami, the series centers on Dexter Morgan, a forensic technician specializing in bloodstain pattern analysis for the fictional Miami Metro Police Department, who leads a secret parallel life as a vigilante serial killer, hunting down murderers who have not been adequately punished by the justice system due to corruption or legal technicalities. In the episode, Dexter tries to contact Debra, who has been avoiding him for the past months.

According to Nielsen Media Research, the episode was seen by an estimated 2.48 million household viewers and gained a 1.2 ratings share among adults aged 18–49. The episode received positive reviews from critics, who praised Jennifer Carpenter's performance and the ending, although some expressed criticism for the time jump.

== Plot ==
Six months have passed since LaGuerta's death, and Dexter (Michael C. Hall) feels that things have improved for him; he spends more time with Harrison, hangs out with the squad, and is still continuing his night activities. However, his relationship with Debra (Jennifer Carpenter) has fallen apart; she quit the police and now works as a private investigator.

Angel (David Zayas) has abandoned his plans for retirement, and has now become Lieutenant after Debra's resignation. Later, Miami Metro investigates a dead body with a bullet wound in a park. However, they discover that the man had the back of his head removed, and that the killer has excised melon ball-sized scoops of brain tissue. Debra is now in a relationship with Andrew Briggs (Rhys Coiro), a man who has stolen jewels from the mob. Debra often uses drugs with Andrew, still feeling guilt over killing LaGuerta. Dexter visits Debra's employer, Jacob Elway (Sean Patrick Flanery), who runs a private investigation company. Elway has not heard from Debra in weeks, revealing that she is pursuing Briggs to apprehend him. Tracking Debra's credit cards, he locates her in Fort Lauderdale.

Dexter follows Debra to a store, asking her why she avoids him. Debra finally states that she hates him for ruining her life, also telling him that she "shot the wrong person" on the night of LaGuerta's death. Dexter becomes enraged, and on the drive home attacks another driver for cutting him off. Debra gets in contact with Quinn (Desmond Harrington) when she finds that Briggs is doing business with a criminal known as El Sapo (Nick Gomez). Newly reinstated Matthews (Geoff Pierson) introduces Miami Metro to Dr. Evelyn Vogel (Charlotte Rampling), a psychopath expert to help with the new killer. Despite having only one murder confirmed, Vogel believes he might be a serial killer, offering a theory on how he got the victim killed. She takes an interest in Dexter, who decides to search her background.

Dexter finds that El Sapo is not a dealer but a mob hitman. He visits Quinn to get Debra's motel location, but is forced to bring Harrison with him when Jamie (Aimee Garcia), in a secret relationship with Quinn, is not available. He visits Debra to warn her, but she refuses to listen, telling Dexter she deserves to die. Briggs comes to Debra's defense and fights with Dexter who fatally stabs Briggs in the chest. Devastated, Debra orders Dexter to leave as she calls the police. She gets in touch with Elway, unaware that El Sapo is now following her. The following day, Dexter is visited by Vogel, who leaves him an envelope that contains murderous drawings from Dexter's childhood. He confronts her, but Vogel asserts he cannot kill her as she does not fit the Code of Harry. Vogel then walks away, leaving Dexter confused.

== Production ==
The episode was written by executive producer Scott Buck, and directed by Keith Gordon. This was Buck's 17th writing credit, and Gordon's tenth directing credit.

== Reception ==
=== Viewers ===
In its original American broadcast, "A Beautiful Day" was seen by an estimated 2.48 million household viewers with a 1.2 in the 18–49 demographics. This means that 1.2 percent of all households with televisions watched the episode. This was a 10% decrease in viewership from the previous episode, which was watched by an estimated 2.75 million household viewers with a 1.4 in the 18–49 demographics.

Showtime reported that with another airing, 3.2 million viewers watched the episode on its first night.

=== Critical reviews ===
"A Beautiful Day" received positive reviews from critics. Matt Fowler of IGN gave the episode a "good" 7.8 out of 10, and wrote, "I wasn't so welcoming for this premiere as a whole though. Sure, "A Beautiful Day" didn't match up to last year's excellent "Are You...?" but I wasn't fully expecting it to. Still, I think this story, this episode, could have benefitted more had it picked things up right after, or soon after, where the Season 7 premiere left off. Setting it six months later was certainly a bold creative choice, which this show has done on occasion, but I don't think it was the best choice here."

Joshua Alston of The A.V. Club gave the episode a "B–" grade and wrote, "I'm not of the impression that “A Beautiful Day” is necessarily representative of what the show's final season has in store. It could be, but following a cliffhanger as significant as Deb murdering LaGuerta, the season opener has a lot to accomplish between moving the pieces into place and starting the ball rolling on this season's story. The episode was much better at the former than the latter, though I'm less interested in Evelyn Vogel and the brain-carving killer as I am in what the writers have planned to bring this meandering story to a satisfying close so that wasn't cause for concern." Kevin Fitzpatrick of ScreenCrush wrote, "An overly expository premiere to be sure, but overall one that gets the final hours of Dexter off to a very strong start."

Alan Sepinwall of HitFix wrote, "I was glad to see "A Beautiful Day" focusing so much on the estrangement between Deb and Dexter in the wake of LaGuerta's murder, and to see that none of this is being ignored. The show is ending this year, and so the creative team can take the story to a real conclusion, whatever that winds up being, and if it wants us to hate Dexter by the end of things, that would be okay." Richard Rys of Vulture gave the episode a 4 star rating out of 5 and wrote, "Whatever clarity Vogel may provide, it will be fleeting; there's no lighthouse in Dexter's future. As he stands in the motel parking lot, trying not to cover his son in the blood of the man he just murdered, Dexter knows Deb speaks the truth."

James Hibberd of Entertainment Weekly wrote, "A great final season opener. It leaves us all set up for next week, with Dex getting one-upped left and right. Vogel has him figured out. Deb is infuriating him with her rebellious behavior, yet he has no right to stop her." Cory Barker of TV.com wrote, "Knowing that this is the final season of Dexter, I'm willing to be a little more patient. It's not as if there's a whole lot unresolved narrative mysteries or dangling plot threads that the show must get to. The series is going to do what it always does — introduce some seasonal supporting characters who will most certainly get killed, focus too much on random procedural elements — and it looks as though the Dexter and Deb tension will be more simmering than explosive, at least at the outset. Nevertheless, I find that to be a smart choice, and a nice little departure from the structure of Season 7."

Andrea Reiher of Zap2it wrote, "This sets up a really interesting way to go for the final season. Can Dexter recapture some semblance of a family unit? Is there any getting Deb back, or is she lost forever?" Alan Danzis of BuddyTV wrote, "While Harry gave Dexter the code, perhaps it was Deb all along (subconsciously and then last season, consciously) that convinced him to follow it. Without her in his life now, who's to say what code he will or will not follow?"

Billy Grifter of Den of Geek wrote, "In my wildest imagination, Dexter isn't going to end well, it's just how badly events will conclude and what mitigation and redemption they can introduce without entirely jumping this shark. The writers have so far kept their conclusion powder very dry so far, so it's far too early to call if this season is going to rival the triumphant crescendo of season four, or end with a less-than satisfactory thud that we've experienced in others." Matt Richenthal of TV Fanatic gave the episode a 4.6 star rating out of 5 and wrote, "Kudos to both the writers and Jennifer Carpenter for taking the character down such a disturbing path. It was an eerie pleasure to watch such a twitchy, energetic, drugged up Deb in her new life, undercover and out of control."

Alex Moaba of HuffPost wrote, "Did Dexter kill Briggs in self defense? Maybe, and the guy was a scumbag who was putting Deb in danger. But like the road rage strangling, this stabbing fell outside the code, which is collapsing under the weight of Dexter's aggression. That development is a positive sign about the ambition of this final season, and the dark places it could be going." Television Without Pity gave the episode a "B+" grade.
