= Every Silver Lining... =

- Dexter episode
- Episode no.: Season 8 Episode 2
- Directed by: Michael C. Hall
- Written by: Manny Coto
- Cinematography by: Jeffrey Jur
- Editing by: Amy E. Duddleston
- Original release date: July 7, 2013
- Running time: 57 minutes

Guest appearances
- Charlotte Rampling as Evelyn Vogel (special guest star); Sean Patrick Flanery as Jacob Elway; Barbara Tarbuck as Sussman's Mother

Episode chronology
← Previous "A Beautiful Day"	Next → "What's Eating Dexter Morgan?"
- Dexter season 8

"Every Silver Lining..." is the second episode of the eighth season of the American crime drama television series Dexter. It is the 86th overall episode of the series and was written by executive producer Manny Coto, and directed by lead actor Michael C. Hall. It originally aired on Showtime on July 7, 2013.

Set in Miami, the series centers on Dexter Morgan, a forensic technician specializing in bloodstain pattern analysis for the fictional Miami Metro Police Department, who leads a secret parallel life as a vigilante serial killer, hunting down murderers who have not been adequately punished by the justice system due to corruption or legal technicalities. In the episode, Dexter discovers that Vogel was heavily involved in his childhood, while Debra is pursued by El Sapo while trying to locate the jewels.

According to Nielsen Media Research, the episode was seen by an estimated 2.52 million household viewers and gained a 1.2 ratings share among adults aged 18–49. The episode received highly positive reviews from critics, who considered it an improvement over the season premiere.

== Plot ==
Vogel (Charlotte Rampling) shows Dexter (Michael C. Hall) an old recording of a meeting she had with Harry (James Remar). Harry was disturbed by Dexter's behavior, as he was fascinated after visiting a crime scene. Vogel reveals that Harry's fears were confirmed in that Dexter could become a psychopath, so she decided to help him control Dexter's urges. To combat it, she helped him in creating the Code of Harry so Dexter could target criminals.

Vogel contacted Dexter because she wants his help in the new serial killer case, who has been dubbed "The Brain Surgeon." The killer left her a jar containing scoops of brain tissue from the victim found at the park, and she believes the killer might be one of her former patients. She wants him to find him, but Dexter refuses and leaves. Later, Miami Metro finds another victim credited to The Brain Surgeon, and the fingerprints point to Lyle Sussman as the killer. Vogel once again consults on the case, and Dexter finally warms up to the idea of having someone who understands him. Vogel also reveals that Harry did not want her to get involved in Dexter's life, even after his death. Angel (David Zayas) tells Quinn (Desmond Harrington) that he should take the sergeant's exam, also revealing that he knows he is dating Jamie (Aimee Garcia). The pressure causes Quinn's relationship with Jamie to dwindle, prompting her to warn her brother to not get involved in her relationships.

Debra (Jennifer Carpenter) returns to work with Elway (Sean Patrick Flanery), claiming he only retrieved a key to an unknown storage unit. As they check on units, they are unaware that they are being followed by El Sapo (Nick Gomez). Debra finally locates the unit where Andrew Briggs kept the jewels, but is brutally attacked and robbed by El Sapo. Subsequently, Miami Metro is called to the scene, as El Sapo was found shot to death. Worried that Debra might be the target for an unknown hitman, Dexter visits her at her house to warn her, but she tells him to leave. That night, Dexter finds a cabin owned by Sussman, finding evidence to suggest that he might be the Brain Surgeon. He also discovers Sussman dead, making him suspect he is not the Brain Surgeon.

Debra surprisingly shows up at Miami Metro, to testify and claim she was not present during Briggs' murder. Dexter pulls her out of interrogation, having discovered that she killed El Sapo. To protect Debra, Dexter switches the gun found in the scene to avoid being traced to her. Returning home, Vogel calls Dexter to come after finding that someone broke in. Dexter inspects her house, discovering that the intruder left a DVD. It contains footage of the Brain Surgeon forcing Sussman at gunpoint to kill a victim, before executing Sussman. They agree to not get the police involved, so Dexter can track the Brain Surgeon himself.

== Production ==
=== Development ===
The episode was written by executive producer Manny Coto, and directed by lead actor Michael C. Hall. This was Coto's ninth writing credit, and Hall's first directing credit.

== Reception ==
=== Viewers ===
In its original American broadcast, "Every Silver Lining..." was seen by an estimated 2.52 million household viewers with a 1.2 in the 18–49 demographics. This means that 1.2 percent of all households with televisions watched the episode. This was a slight increase in viewership from the previous episode, which was watched by an estimated 2.48 million household viewers with a 1.2 in the 18–49 demographics.

=== Critical reviews ===
"Every Silver Lining..." received highly positive reviews from critics. Matt Fowler of IGN gave the episode a "great" 8.5 out of 10, and wrote, ""Every Silver Lining..." reminded me of some of the best elements from Season 7 with its detailed and thoughtful conversations about Dexter's actions and the consequences of those actions. And, as a bonus, we were given a bit more insight as to the origins of his actions."

Joshua Alston of The A.V. Club gave the episode an "A–" grade and wrote, "“Every Silver Lining” improved on the season premiére in every way imaginable, and began building a thematic framework that is as intriguing and robust as anything the show has explored. I talked last week about how all of Dexter's relationship dynamics have been exhausted, but given his budding relationship with Vogel, I was wrong about that. I could be forgiven for thinking there were no more ways to skin this cat, since the writers have so often leaned on the Biney-Lila-Prado-Trinity-Lumen-Hannah model of introducing Dexter to someone who almost-but-not-quite fits into his unusual life. While there's nothing to suggest that Dexter's involvement with Vogel won't follow the same broad strokes of that model, it's a wily enough twist on it that I’d be surprised if it turned out to be business as usual, especially with the series finale looming." Kevin Fitzpatrick of ScreenCrush wrote, ""Every Silver Lining" treats this development somewhat weakly as a moment of surprise, given that most viewers would have suspected Deb to be El Sapo's killer based on proximity alone, but regardless of the unsurprising reveal, we're still seeing a much more dangerous side to Deb than ever before."

Alan Sepinwall of HitFix wrote, "the idea of an expert in the field of psychopaths — and one who was there to help give birth to Dexter's killing ways — getting an intimate look at the man (and monster) Dexter has become is a really interesting one, especially when that expert is played by Charlotte Rampling. The show has toyed from time to time with the idea that Dexter isn't quite the sociopath he believes himself to be, and this new relationship — with a woman who likes the idea of what she turned Dexter into — should force the deepest examination of that question yet in the final season. So I'm looking forward to where this all goes." Richard Rys of Vulture gave the episode a 3 star rating out of 5 and wrote, "I doubt Dr. Vogel is the Brain Surgeon herself — that's too obvious, especially this early in the season. But she could be working with him, setting all of this up to manipulate Dexter for some sick reason. Even if she’s really in danger, it seems unlikely that she truly has Dexter’s best interests in mind (no pun intended)."

James Hibberd of Entertainment Weekly wrote, "So deadly despairing Deb has struck again. And this time it's cold premeditated murder. Nobody's twisting her arm now. How do we feel about this? And will she become a serial killer too? She's only one murder shy of fitting the definition." Cory Barker of TV.com wrote, "After the season premiere, I was a little wary of where Dexter's final season might be headed. Although there are still some things that I'm fearful of, "Every Silver Lining" did a better job of creating a road map for Dexter and Deb's stories in the next 10 episodes."

Andrea Reiher of Zap2it wrote, "In typical Deb fashion, this means throwing herself into her work, to the point where she kills El Sapo, the mafia guy after Briggs, so she can recover the jewelry Briggs stole. Dexter figures out it was Deb who killed Sapo and covers it up, though she hardly cares. She probably wanted to get caught, on some level." Alan Danzis of BuddyTV wrote, "It seems fitting in the final season for the show Dexter to wrestle with this idea again, and perhaps, with its final big bad, we'll even find out what biologically and psychologically it means to be a killer."

Nick Harley of Den of Geek wrote, "Lots of things are popping off on Dexter, and when this show is good, it makes for some addictive and enticing television. Let's hope they can keep this up, I remember my reviews at this point of last season to be almost equally optimistic, and we remember how that all turned out." Matt Richenthal of TV Fanatic gave the episode a 4.8 star rating out of 5 and wrote, "It's a suspenseful dichotomy. Dexter can continue to crumble around Deb or he can be liberated by Vogel. The former option is frightening to the man himself. The latter option, and what a conscious-free Dexter Morgan may mean, should be frightening to everyone else."

Alex Moaba of HuffPost wrote, "So where does this all leave us? Dexter has a new therapist. Deb is badly in need of one. They're both serial killers now! The Brain Surgeon is on the loose. And this is shaping up to be a great final season of Dexter." Television Without Pity gave the episode a "B+" grade.
