= Monkey in a Box =

- Dexter episode
- Episode no.: Season 8 Episode 11
- Directed by: Ernest Dickerson
- Written by: Tim Schlattmann; Wendy West
- Cinematography by: Jeffrey Jur
- Editing by: Amy E. Duddleston
- Original release date: September 15, 2013
- Running time: 52 minutes

Guest appearances
- Yvonne Strahovski as Hannah McKay (special guest star); Sean Patrick Flanery as Jacob Elway; Kenny Johnson as Max Clayton; Valerie Cruz as Sylvia Prado; Dora Madison Burge as Niki Walters; Darri Ingólfsson as Oliver Saxon

Episode chronology
← Previous "Goodbye Miami"	Next → "Remember the Monsters?"
- Dexter season 8

"Monkey in a Box" is the eleventh episode of the eighth season of the American crime drama television series Dexter. It is the 95th overall episode of the series and was written by executive producers Tim Schlattmann and Wendy West, and directed by Ernest Dickerson. It originally aired on Showtime on September 15, 2013.

Set in Miami, the series centers on Dexter Morgan, a forensic technician specializing in bloodstain pattern analysis for the fictional Miami Metro Police Department, who leads a secret parallel life as a vigilante serial killer, hunting down murderers who have not been adequately punished by the justice system due to corruption or legal technicalities. In the episode, Dexter tries to find Saxon before leaving for Argentina, while Debra returns to Miami Metro as detective.

According to Nielsen Media Research, the episode was seen by an estimated 2.40 million household viewers and gained a 1.0 ratings share among adults aged 18–49. The episode received mixed reviews from critics, who criticized the writing, pacing, logic, characters' actions and plot holes.

== Plot ==
At Vogel's house, Dexter (Michael C. Hall) removes all of the files detailing his connection to Vogel before calling the police. He then lies to Angel (David Zayas) and Quinn (Desmond Harrington) that he already found her dead, not revealing that Saxon (Darri Ingólfsson) is the killer.

Dexter discovers that Saxon issued a demolition permission to gain access to an abandoned hospital, deducing that must be his hideout. Saxon shows up at the station to clear his name regarding Cassie's murder, but is taken aback when Dexter pulls a DNA swab on him. He provides the information to Debra (Jennifer Carpenter), who is surprised that her brother chose to let the police take care of Saxon instead. As Debra begins working again as a detective, she is questioned by Clayton (Kenny Johnson), as Hannah (Yvonne Strahovski) was reported to be seen at a hospital using Debra's name. She claims she was the one who took Harrison there, but Clayton is not convinced. He raises his suspicions to Elway (Sean Patrick Flanery), who decides to visit Debra, finding signs that there are more people in the house.

After Vogel's funeral, the police go to Angel's restaurant. Angel, Quinn and Matthews (Geoff Pierson) each take turns to bid farewell to Dexter, telling him he can return if he wants. Afterwards, Dexter meets with Sylvia Prado (Valerie Cruz), who is helping him find buyers for his apartment. He is surprised when one of the interested clients is Saxon himself, and they are left alone to talk. Saxon wants to make a truce with Dexter, wherein he will not pursue and kill him if Dexter does the same, with both moving on with their lives. Dexter agrees, but secretly continues his plan to kill him. To avoid Elway catching her, Hannah moves to a hotel near the airport. Elway and Clayton break into Debra's house, with Elway finding booked flights on her computer.

Obtaining footage of Saxon's murders, Dexter anonymously sends it to the media, while the police receive confirmation that his real name is Daniel Vogel. As a hurricane approaches Miami, Saxon discovers his photograph in a news report and sets out to kill Dexter at his apartment. However, Dexter anticipates this and sedates him with Debra's help. Dexter takes Saxon to the abandoned hospital to kill him, but Dexter finds that he has lost his interest in killing, preferring to just be with Hannah. With his Dark Passenger gone, he shares a final conversation with Harry Morgan (James Remar), noting that he does not need him anymore. He calls Debra to come and arrest him, and they embrace before Dexter leaves. Unknown to them, Clayton has followed Debra and has entered the hospital, finding Saxon strapped to his killing chair. He releases Saxon, who in turn takes a knife to kill Clayton. When Debra enters, Saxon uses Clayton's gun to shoot her and escape. As Dexter and Harrison leave for the airport, Elway follows Hannah to the airport.

== Production ==
=== Development ===
The episode was written by executive producers Tim Schlattmann and Wendy West, and directed by Ernest Dickerson. This was Schlattmann's 16th writing credit, West's 11th writing credit, and Dickerson's ninth directing credit.

== Reception ==
=== Viewers ===
In its original American broadcast, "Monkey in a Box" was seen by an estimated 2.40 million household viewers with a 1.0 in the 18–49 demographics. This means that 1 percent of all households with televisions watched the episode. This was a slight increase in viewership from the previous episode, which was watched by an estimated 2.34 million household viewers with a 1.1 in the 18–49 demographics.

=== Critical reviews ===
"Monkey in a Box" received mixed reviews from critics. Matt Fowler of IGN gave the episode an "okay" 6.8 out of 10, and wrote, "No, "Monkey in a Box," wasn't outright terrible, but it also wasn't close to anything I wanted from the penultimate series episode of Dexter. Way too much of this season has dealt with, and focused on, characters who've only just been introduced to us instead doing something great and vital with the characters it already has. I'll admit to this. I really liked the huge corner Dexter turned in the end. Finally, he rid himself of his "Dark Passenger.""

Joshua Alston of The A.V. Club gave the episode a "D" grade and wrote, "Once the bar is so low, even Dexter could manage to stumble over it, so each week I think this could be the episode that's not quite as horrific as I thought it would be. I can't say “Monkey In A Box” is that episode; in terms of storytelling quality, it's about on par with the narrative meandering, inscrutable characterization and flat-tire pacing that has characterized the season. But what made “Monkey” semi-tolerable is that it provided a few brief moments in which the season's inert plotting wasn't in the foreground. It contained shards of ideas that could fit into anyone's concept of a penultimate episode of Dexter, and sort of flicked at the themes that drew viewers to this show in the first place."

Richard Rys of Vulture gave the episode a 3 star rating out of 5 and wrote, "Does the impending convergence of Dex, Saxon, the cops, Elway, and Tropical Storm Laura feel like an ending eight seasons in the making? Not really. My guess is that most fans would agree the series should have closed with season five, as Dexter copes with Rita's death and realizes that serial killers can't live happily ever after. It seems the latter point will be made next week, as the chances of Dexter making it to Argentina with Hannah and Harrison are about as slim as Deb's skinny jeans." Kevin Fitzpatrick of ScreenCrush wrote, "It can be frustrating to see Dexter come to such a ham-fisted close, especially as it seems so much of its climax will depend on Deb's life hanging in the balance, while an increasingly flat villain looms over the final hour. We'll keep our hopes up for the series finale, though "Monkey in a Box" doesn't leave us with much confidence."

James Hibberd of Entertainment Weekly wrote, "It was a major episode, though it lacked tension for its first half and there were a few big plot holes for nitpickers to jeer at." Cory Barker of TV.com wrote, "There's no reason to be mad anymore, there's no reason to throw much of a fit about what could have been or should have been. The show is one hour away from being over forever and while it's given us a lot of great things in its eight years on the air, this final season won't end up being one of them. "Monkey in a Box" wasn't appreciably worse than the last few episodes, it just hurt a little more because there's always that twinge of hope with those shows we've stuck with that somehow, some way, it all won't end like shit after all. HA, NOPE."

Andrea Reiher of Zap2it wrote, "We've been wrestling all season with how we feel about the way Dexter has gone the last two seasons of the show. Now there's only one episode left and we wonder if the show is going to take a sharp left turn." Alan Danzis of BuddyTV wrote, "none of it feels earned. It feels like a pre-determined ending that producers decided on years ago. For a season full of promise that is squandered in episode after episode, the show seems to be limping to its big finish next week."

Nick Harley of Den of Geek gave the episode a 3 star rating out of 5 and wrote, "Cliffhanger for cliffhanger's sake is never a good thing. The only thing to counter balance the senselessness of that final scene was the end of Dexter's Ghost Dad conversations, so glad those are over. At least there's a silver lining." Miranda Wicker of TV Fanatic gave the episode a 4 star rating out of 5 and wrote, "We're supposed to be left feeling uncertain and ill-equipped to deal with the possibility of losing a beloved character this close to the end. Bravo to that, writers. You got something right this season after getting so much so very, very wrong."

Alex Moaba of HuffPost wrote, "There's only one episode of Dexter left and as Showtime's serial killer thriller races to the finish line, a couple of things seem clear: Dexter Morgan is deluding himself if he thinks he's actually going to escape to a happy ending in Argentina, and the show's writing is turning Dexter into an unintentional comedy." Television Without Pity gave the episode a "C+" grade.
