= Scar Tissue (Dexter) =

- Dexter episode
- Episode no.: Season 8 Episode 4
- Directed by: Stefan Schwartz
- Written by: Tim Schlattmann
- Cinematography by: Jeffrey Jur
- Editing by: Louis Cioffi
- Original release date: July 21, 2013
- Running time: 50 minutes

Guest appearances
- Charlotte Rampling as Dr. Evelyn Vogel (special guest star); Sean Patrick Flanery as Jacob Elway; Aaron McCusker as A.J. Yates; Bethany Joy Lenz as Cassie Jollenston; Dora Madison Burge as Niki Walters

Episode chronology
← Previous "What's Eating Dexter Morgan?"	Next → "This Little Piggy"
- Dexter season 8

"Scar Tissue" is the fourth episode of the eighth season of the American crime drama television series Dexter. It is the 88th overall episode of the series and was written by executive producer Tim Schlattmann, and directed by Stefan Schwartz. It originally aired on Showtime on July 21, 2013.

Set in Miami, the series centers on Dexter Morgan, a forensic technician specializing in bloodstain pattern analysis for the fictional Miami Metro Police Department, who leads a secret parallel life as a vigilante serial killer, hunting down murderers who have not been adequately punished by the justice system due to corruption or legal technicalities. In the episode, Dexter tracks one of Vogel's former patients, while Vogel tries to help Debra overcome her grief.

According to Nielsen Media Research, the episode was seen by an estimated 2.47 million household viewers and gained a 1.2 ratings share among adults aged 18–49. The episode received positive reviews from critics, who praised the performances, character development and ending.

== Plot ==
Vogel (Charlotte Rampling) starts treating Debra (Jennifer Carpenter) for her PTSD by taking her to the shipping container where she killed LaGuerta. Vogel tries to suggest that Debra's decision saved Dexter's life, but Debra believes she only wants to find excuses for Dexter's actions.

Dexter (Michael C. Hall) meets with Vogel, who tells him that Debra's therapy is still in progress, but that he should prepare in case Debra decides to cut him off from her life. Dexter continues investigating the Brain Surgeon, now tracking another of Vogel's patients, A.J. Yates (Aaron McCusker). Yates is characterized as a man with a violent past, but Vogel claims he has changed for the better. Dexter sneaks into Yates' house, unaware that Yates has been watching him through security cameras. Yates, who is hiding in a basement, prepares to attack him, until Dexter calls Vogel. Yates secretly returns to the basement, where he is keeping a woman hostage.

Miami Metro investigates the murder of Norma Rivera, who exhibits signs of a brutal beating. Quinn (Desmond Harrington) has passed the sergeant's exam, but Matthews (Geoff Pierson) tells Angel (David Zayas) that he prefers Detective Angie Miller for the position. Quinn also makes a poor impression when he punches Debra's DUI arresting officer. Masuka (C. S. Lee) is amused when he finds a young girl waiting for him at the lab. However, he is surprised when the girl, Niki (Dora Madison Burge), introduces herself as his daughter, given that he was a sperm donor during college. Dexter returns to his apartment, meeting his new neighbor, Cassie (Bethany Joy Lenz). Dexter helps her with laundry, raising Cassie's interest in him. To get Debra to address her actions, Vogel locks herself and Debra in the container. While Debra feels guilt for killing an innocent woman, Vogel insists "in your heart, you know you will always choose Dexter."

Dexter returns to Yates' residence and finds the hidden entrance and proof he is the Brain Surgeon. Instead of Yates he finds the female prisoner stabbed and rescues her. As he gets in touch with Vogel, Dexter is upset to learn that she has been studying him since their meeting, and proclaims he is done with her after finding Yates. Dexter uses Yates' ailing father to lure him, but Yates escapes after putting his father in danger. During this, Debra discovers a recorded session where Harry (James Remar) expresses disgust after witnessing Dexter killing a man, feeling he cannot live with it. (Note: As depicted in "There's Something About Harry".) Subsequently, Dexter and Debra go for a car ride, talking about Vogel's sessions. Debra asks Dexter about Harry's suicide, which he confirms. Suddenly, Debra grabs the wheel, crashing the car into a lake. A man witnesses the event and rescues Debra, who has a change of heart and ends up saving Dexter.

== Production ==
=== Development ===
The episode was written by executive producer Tim Schlattmann, and directed by Stefan Schwartz. This was Schlattmann's 15th writing credit, and Schwartz's third directing credit.

== Reception ==
=== Viewers ===
In its original American broadcast, "Scar Tissue" was seen by an estimated 2.47 million household viewers with a 1.2 in the 18–49 demographics. This means that 1.2 percent of all households with televisions watched the episode. This was a slight increase in viewership from the previous episode, which was watched by an estimated 2.43 million household viewers with a 1.1 in the 18–49 demographics.

=== Critical reviews ===
"Scar Tissue" received positive reviews from critics. Matt Fowler of IGN gave the episode a "great" 8.8 out of 10, and wrote, ""Scar Tissue" showed us that the show, and this season, means business when it comes to Deb's trauma. We're four episodes in now and Deb learning more about Dexter has only led to her taking more extreme measures. But perhaps this is it for her. Once again, she chose to save Dexter. "You'll always choose Dexter," Vogel said."

Joshua Alston of The A.V. Club gave the episode a "C" grade and wrote, "So at the risk of obviating my own reviews, there's not much weight to my grade for “Scar Tissue,” which will likely be the case for the season's middle portion. I'm mostly sticking around to see how it all ends. The biggest problem with “Scar Tissue,” though, is how it suggests Dexter might have missed its best opportunity to stick the landing."

Alan Sepinwall of HitFix wrote, "Deb drives Dexter into a lake, nearly drowning herself in the process. While our man is obviously going to survive this particular cliffhanger — the show won't spend three-fourths of its final season on Quinn's promotion and Masuka's daughter — this illustrates just how deep the schism has grown between sister and brother, even if she decides to swim after him in the hour's closing moments. And you just know that Vogel is going to use this to drive the wedge deeper and deeper between them." Richard Rys of Vulture gave the episode a 4 star rating out of 5 and wrote, "another excellent episode. Along with the acting, both the writing and the pacing have stood out this season. And even the killer that Dexter is stalking is interesting, which isn't always the case."

James Hibberd of Entertainment Weekly wrote, "She turns into a literal Dark Passenger for Dexter by grabbing the wheel driving the car into a lake (the crash was pretty great). Debra is rescued by a fisherman, then goes back and pulls out an unconscious Dexter rather than letting him die. (I'm pretty sure it's not a spoiler to reveal that Dexter didn't just die here in the fourth episode of the final season)." Cory Barker of TV.com wrote, "I'm hoping that "Scar Tissue" marks something of a mini turning point for the season. The first three episodes were far from bad (or even near this show's worst), but it was nice to see Dexter rebound from last week's loud, wheel-spinning episode with something that was both more interesting as an individual episode and likely more of a launchpad for the next four to six installments. Deb made some big choices in this one. Even she couldn't stand by the biggest one, but she can't take it back, just like she can't take back murdering LaGuerta. Something has to give."

Andrea Reiher of Zap2it wrote, "we were sure Deb was going to kill herself, which would have been an interesting path for this season to take. Instead, she tries to take out both herself and Dexter - but a good Samaritan saves Deb and Deb saves Dexter. It's as Dr. Vogel says - she'll always choose Dexter." Alan Danzis of BuddyTV wrote, "If Dexter the character is going to meet a deadly end when Dexter the series concludes, it would have to be at the hands of Deb, no? It would seem odd for a random cop - or one of Dexter's somewhat bumbling "friends" - to do the deed, right? But if it was going to be Deb... it wouldn't happen in the fourth episode of the season, right?"

Billy Grifter of Den of Geek wrote, "With the way this season is working out, my spider-sense is tingling that all we've been presented so far is basically a distraction. It's there to obscure a super-twist the writers want to launch, presumably something about Dexter that we were presented with from the outset that just isn't true." Matt Richenthal of TV Fanatic gave the episode a 4.2 star rating out of 5 and wrote, "It's fascinating to watch Jennifer Carpenter's committed performance and to wonder what Deb will do next. The guilt of killing LaGuerta and the reaction to her brother's true identity has been the driving force behind Dexter Season 8, propelling the story in a number of directions. And none of them make it look like a happy ending is on the horizon."

Alex Moaba of HuffPost wrote, "It would have been one thing if Deb went through with it. But in her latest display of conflicted decision-making, she saved him. Maybe this means they can forgive each other now and become the brother and sister accomplices they were meant to be." Television Without Pity gave the episode an "A–" grade.
