= What's Eating Dexter Morgan? =

- Dexter episode
- Episode no.: Season 8 Episode 3
- Directed by: Ernest Dickerson
- Written by: Lauren Gussis
- Original air date: July 14, 2013
- Running time: 50 minutes

Guest appearances
- Charlotte Rampling as Dr. Evelyn Vogel; Sean Patrick Flanery as Jacob Elway; Rebecca Staab as Lucy Gerard; Andrew Elvis Miller as Ron Galuzzo; Scott Michael Morgan as Lyle Sussman; Dana L. Wilson as Det. Angie Miller

Episode chronology
← Previous "Every Silver Lining..."	Next → "Scar Tissue"
- Dexter (season 8)

"What's Eating Dexter Morgan?" is the third episode of the eighth season of the Showtime television series Dexter. The episode originally aired on July 14, 2013. It was directed by Ernest Dickerson and written by executive producer Lauren Gussis, who had both worked on the series for several years.

In the episode, the protagonist and titular serial killer Dexter Morgan (Michael C. Hall) and Dr. Evelyn Vogel (special guest star Charlotte Rampling) continue to track the "Brain Surgeon" serial killer, which leads Dexter to a cannibal killer. Meanwhile, Dexter's sister Debra Morgan's (Jennifer Carpenter) mounting guilt over killing María LaGuerta to protect Dexter in the previous season begins to consume her.

The episode received mixed reviews, with reviewers critical of its "meandering" pace but praising Deb's character arc and Carpenter's performance.

== Plot ==
With Sussman's body arranged to look like a suicide, Miami Metro closes the Brain Surgeon case, a serial killer who removes pieces of his victims' brains, and focuses on El Sapo (Nick Gomez), a hitman hired by the mob whom Debra killed in the previous episode. Dexter, however, knows that Sussman has been framed, and the real killer is still at large.

Deb is arrested for DUI and damaging city property (a parking meter). She calls Joey Quinn (Desmond Harrington), who has the charges dropped. Quinn expresses his worries about Debra, which she shrugs off.

Deb and Jacob Elway's (Sean Patrick Flanery) latest case involves a woman (Rebecca Staab) who suspects her husband of cheating. They catch him in the act, but she patently denies the photographic evidence.

As Dexter and Dr. Vogel continue to track down the Brain Surgeon, Vogel finds two pieces of a human occipital lobe, the part of the brain used for seeing, on her doorstep; Dexter theorizes they are being watched. From her list of patients, they suspect Ron Galuzzo (Andrew Elvis Miller), a fitness equipment salesman who once murdered his friend. Vogel suspects he might want revenge on her since she institutionalized him. Suspicious when he denies knowing Vogel, Dexter breaks into his house to discover human body parts and organs in his refrigerator.

When Dexter insists that he loves Debra, Vogel says that he only loves the things she does for him. She also notes how she and Harry (James Remar) disagreed over the most important rule of the Code; while Harry thought it should be to never kill an innocent person, Vogel maintained that it was most important to not get caught.

Meanwhile, Angel Batista (David Zayas) tries to motivate Quinn to pass the sergeant's exam, as Jamie (Aimee Garcia) gets jealous of the time Quinn spends with Deb.

Dexter takes Debra to dinner to assuage her guilt, pointing out a man dining in the restaurant with his family, identifying him as the man she saved during a restaurant shooting in the fifth season. This only worsens her guilt, and she later drunkenly confesses, to an unconvinced Quinn, to LaGuerta's murder. Quinn calls Dexter, who arrives with Vogel, Dexter gives Debra an M99 injection, telling Quinn she fainted, brings her home and asks Vogel to help her.

The episode closes with the cannibalistic Galuzzo strapped to Dexter's table, as a disheartened Dexter narrates that he also "consumes everyone he loves."

== Reception ==
=== Ratings ===
In its original American broadcast, "What's Eating Dexter Morgan?" was watched by 2.43 million viewers, down 90,000 from the previous episode.

=== Reviews ===
The episode received mixed reviews. Many critics questioned Vogel and Elway's true intentions; however, Vogel's character and Charlotte Rampling's portrayal of her was well received. The cannibal plotline was received more negatively; critics were more enthusiastic about Jennifer Carpenter's acting and Debra's arc.

James Queally of The Star-Ledger had mixed feelings about the episode, enjoying Deb's arc but calling it "sluggish" filler, and a letdown compared to the previous episode.

Matt Fowler of IGN, like Queally, praised Vogel's continuing role in the series but thought the cannibal plotline was "comical." He felt the episode retread some of the ground made in the previous episode.

Some reviewers, such as Cassandra Berube of The Baltimore Sun, thought it was too obvious that Galuzzo was not the Brain Surgeon.

Kevin Fitzpatrick of ScreenCrush called Galuzzo's plot "cartoonish" and was weary of the Brain Surgeon arc as a whole. Like others, he praised Jennifer Carpenter's portrayal of Debra, writing that Carpenter "continues to deliver a strong performance in allowing the character to unravel." He criticized the scene with Debra in the police station, noting how convenient it was that no other characters saw her and that Quinn seemed "dismissive" rather than suspicious. Cory Barker of TV.com also criticized how the writers took advantage of Quinn's "idiocy." Gregory Eckert of Paste also noted how the writers used Quinn to be always just on the edge of discovering Dexter's secret.

Cory Barker also praised Carpenter's portrayal of Debra's despair and hopelessness. He criticized that the episode seemed to put the characters into "forced situations," especially in the last third.

The Huffington Post's Alex Moaba praised Carpenter's acting and noted that Debra has hit "rock bottom." However, Moaba also wrote that "damaged Deb is getting to be a little bit of a drag." Alyse Wax of Fearnet, however, thought that Debra was close to but not at rock bottom, and was desperately trying to redeem herself. Alan Sepinwall also praised Carpenter and noted that show was shifting its sympathies from Dexter to Debra. IGN's Matt Fowler also praised Carpenter's range.

Writing for TV Fanatic, Matt Richenthal wrote Debra's scenes were "terrific" and "riveting," and opined "Jennifer Carpenter once again pour[ed] all she has into Deb's collapse. It was impossible not to be teetering on the edge of one's seat as Deb entered the police station and fell apart, wanting to confess it all."

Writing for Paste, Gregory Eckert noted that the Brain Surgeon arc and Galuzzo's story seemed insignificant in the season's arc, pointing to the conflict between Dexter and Deb as the main dramatic crux, opining "As long as Deb is out of control, Dex is a mere shell of his old existence."

Bill Harris of the Toronto Sun noted the growing importance of Debra's character arc and the differences between Dexter and her, writing "Dexter is the name of the show. But Debra is the story of the show."

Joshua Alston of The A.V. Club was positive of Evelyn Vogel's character and her motherly and "tough love" relationship to Dexter, writing "Vogel makes no apologies for what Dexter is and loves him because of his homicidal tendencies, not in spite of them." Though he felt the Brain Surgeon arc was moving slowly, he felt it had potential.

Andrea Reiher of Zap2it also saw Vogel as Dexter's surrogate mother. James Queally writes "Vogel is great as a mediator in the show's philosophical arguments", and Matt Richenthal also praised the debate the character brought up in whether Dexter really loves Deb.

Cory Barker thinks Rampling's performance is Emmy-worthy and praised the thematic grounds the character helps cover; and her role to both "praise and interrogate Dexter's processes."

Sepinwall also found Dexter and Vogel's conversations interesting, especially in how (in his opinion) Vogel misunderstands Dexter as being incapable of love toward Deb.
