= Dress Code (Dexter) =

- Dexter episode
- Episode no.: Season 8 Episode 7
- Directed by: Alik Sakharov
- Written by: Arika Lisanne Mittman
- Cinematography by: Jeffrey Jur
- Editing by: Louis Cioffi
- Original release date: August 11, 2013
- Running time: 53 minutes

Guest appearances
- Yvonne Strahovski as Hannah McKay (special guest star); Charlotte Rampling as Dr. Evelyn Vogel (special guest star); Sean Patrick Flanery as Jacob Elway; Bethany Joy Lenz as Cassie Jollenston; Julian Sands as Miles Castner; Sam Underwood as Zach Hamilton; Dora Madison Burge as Niki Walters; Darri Ingólfsson as Oliver Saxon

Episode chronology
← Previous "A Little Reflection"	Next → "Are We There Yet?"
- Dexter season 8

"Dress Code" is the seventh episode of the eighth season of the American crime drama television series Dexter. It is the 91st overall episode of the series and was written by producer Arika Lisanne Mittman, and directed by Alik Sakharov. It originally aired on Showtime on August 11, 2013.

Set in Miami, the series centers on Dexter Morgan, a forensic technician specializing in bloodstain pattern analysis for the fictional Miami Metro Police Department, who leads a secret parallel life as a vigilante serial killer, hunting down murderers who have not been adequately punished by the justice system due to corruption or legal technicalities. In the episode, Dexter tries to find out why Hannah returned, while also trying to guide Zach in controlling his urge.

According to Nielsen Media Research, the episode was seen by an estimated 1.90 million household viewers and gained a 0.9 ratings share among adults aged 18–49. The episode received mixed reviews from critics, with criticism aimed towards Hannah's storyline.

== Plot ==
Dexter (Michael C. Hall) wakes up in an industrial area, and later calls Debra (Jennifer Carpenter) so she can pick him up. He reveals Hannah (Yvonne Strahovski) is responsible for drugging them, but they cannot inform authorities as she is aware of everything they did.

Debra checks security footage depicting Hannah renting a car, and Dexter uses the location to find footage of Hannah in a yacht with a man. He follows them to a club, but he is not allowed to enter due to a strict dress code. He calls Zach, (Sam Underwood) who helps him enter. He meets with Hannah, who reveals that the man, Miles Castner (Julian Sands), is her husband. Miles interrupts them, expressing his disdain for Dexter for trying to get Hannah arrested. Dexter later checks Miles's background, discovering that he is wealthy and powerful enough to give Hannah a new identity anywhere in the world. Dexter wants to pursue Hannah, but Debra believes he is still interested in her.

Masuka (C. S. Lee) surprises Niki (Dora Madison Burge) by visiting her at a sports bar she works at as a waitress. However, he is upset when he finds that the waitresses, including Niki, are all topless. While Niki is content with her job, Masuka feels she deserves something better. He convinces Angel (David Zayas) to give her a job as a lab assistant. Zach and a lawyer show up at Miami Metro, demanding that Quinn (Desmond Harrington) stop following Zach around. Angel and Matthews (Geoff Pierson) are forced to comply.

Zach's urge grows stronger and he has a heated conversation with Cassie (Bethany Joy Lenz) when Dexter is not home. While Vogel (Charlotte Rampling) tells Dexter that he needs to focus on Zach, he prioritizes Hannah. After Miles threatens him, Dexter asks Hannah why she married him. Hannah confesses she just wanted a new life, but she couldn't stand Miles's personality, and so she drugged Dexter to lead him to lure and possibly kill Miles. Miles confronts Hannah for speaking with Dexter and brutally beats her at his yacht, but Hannah overpowers and kills him. Dexter arrives and helps her dispose of the body, unaware that Debra is watching them after using Elway's GPS. Dexter is forced to leave Hannah when he is called to a crime scene in his building; Cassie has been bludgeoned in the same fashion as Norma Rivera. Dexter suspects Zach was responsible, and laments that he could not properly teach him.

== Production ==
=== Development ===
The episode was written by producer Arika Lisanne Mittman, and directed by Alik Sakharov. This was Mittman's third writing credit, and Sakharov's second directing credit.

== Reception ==
=== Viewers ===
In its original American broadcast, "Dress Code" was seen by an estimated 1.90 million household viewers with a 0.9 in the 18–49 demographics. This means that 0.9 percent of all households with televisions watched the episode. This was a 15% decrease in viewership from the previous episode, which was watched by an estimated 2.21 million household viewers with a 1.1 in the 18–49 demographics.

=== Critical reviews ===
"Dress Code" received mixed reviews from critics. Matt Fowler of IGN gave the episode a "great" 8.6 out of 10, and wrote, ""Dress Code" may have rushed itself at the end, but ultimately I was happy to have Hannah back and more than willing to let go of the Dexter/Zach tutelage. Deb's sort of fallen by the wayside, but hopefully she'll get back into the mix next week if Hannah's still lingering in town. I don't know what kind of "cat and mouse" game Dexter can have with Zach seeing as how he never even had a chance to teach him that many tricks of the trade, but at least now the show's giving me someone who I really want to see Dexter kill."

Joshua Alston of The A.V. Club gave the episode a "C+" grade and wrote, "“Dress Code” did begin to tip the writers' hand just a smidge. Unlike the silly episodes that preceded it, it began to hint at how the Miami Metro threads might start to weave together and where the characters could be headed. None of it is interesting, per se, but “Dress Code” made Dexter's final season feel like it might be starting to add up to... something. And while I'm not terribly confident in what that something will be, I'm so tired of watching these characters spin their wheels with so little time left to tell this story that any kind of forward motion feels like an improvement."

Richard Rys of Vulture gave the episode a 4 star rating out of 5 and wrote, "In the end, Dexter has two bodies to deal with, and it's a toss-up as to which one is more troublesome in the long run — his fugitive ex-girlfriend’s millionaire husband or the neighbor who was killed by his protégé? Right now, Deb is the most immediate threat to Hannah's future. My money's on Zack as being the bigger problem, especially if he decides to go rogue and reject Dexter's tutelage." Kevin Fitzpatrick of ScreenCrush wrote, "And so, the final six episodes of Dexter have planted their flag. Not as exciting as the final eight of Breaking Bad per se, but exciting nonetheless to have Yvonne Strahovski's Hannah McKay return to shake things up. After all, as much as we like seeing the new side to Dexter in imparting killer fatherly advice to Zach Hamilton, the character seems too cartoonish a sneering villain to ascribe any sympathy to."

James Hibberd of Entertainment Weekly wrote, "This cliffhanger included the return of a major character successfully capturing our heroes. It should ideally have resulted in three things: Hannah's actions should make sense, have consequences and provoke at least one interesting scene. Or two of those things. Or how about one? ... No? No." Cory Barker of TV.com wrote, "I didn't think "Dress Code" was particularly good. Suddenly, for a show that has, like, two main characters and three supporting ones, there are way too many people involved in Dexter and Deb's orbit. Hannah's return in this episode was problematic in its own right, but it also marginalized Vogel pretty substantially. What was so interesting about the good doctor in the season's early episodes has been stripped away so that the show can offer up In Treatment minisodes with Vogel and Deb, and that's just a poor use of the character and Charlotte Rampling. Meanwhile, Hannah's new and now-dead husband won't be an issue going forward, but "Dress Code" had to spend a whole lot of time describing their relationship, only to kill him off. That's time taken away from Deb, or Dexter and Zach, or heck, Quinn and Jamie. But like any mediocre mid-season episode of Dexter, this one was stuffed with a lot of exposition and dead-end stories."

Andrea Reiher of Zap2it wrote, "For Deb, she's starting to maybe warm up to the idea of Elway being into he, but he's also just a touch menacing when he snaps at her, which puts him right back into our red-flag zone. We just cannot figure out if we trust Elway or not." Alan Danzis of BuddyTV wrote, "The return of Hannah this week doesn't bring energy or passion to a fairly flat season, but instead brings ineptitude for all of the characters involved, as well as a handful of meandering subplots that couldn't be more disconnected from each other."

Nick Harley of Den of Geek gave the episode a 2 star rating out of 5 and wrote, "Just like last season, Hannah McKay has popped up at the halfway point to slow everything down. With just a few hours remaining, it seems like the writers of Dexter are throwing everything at the wall and seeing what sticks, and one of the ideas they seem to be fixated on is a love interest for Dexter." Miranda Wicker of TV Fanatic gave the episode a perfect 5 star rating out of 5 and wrote, "After what has been a season filled with lots of talk and little action, the return of Hannah McKay gave a breath of life to tonight's episode of Dexter. "Dress Code" was easily the best episode thus far of Dexter season 8."

Alex Moaba of HuffPost wrote, "Both storylines seemed to drive home the message that Dexter is ultimately destined to live and die alone. His attempts to form relationships with other people in the murderin' community have all ended badly. He's already turned his sister into an accomplice, gotten Rita killed and caused his father's suicide. And now, his sister wants to kill his ex and he's going to have to kill his protege." Television Without Pity gave the episode a "B" grade.
