= This Little Piggy (disambiguation) =

This Little Piggy refers to a Nursery rhyme.

This Little Piggy may also refer to:

- This Little Piggy (Euphoria)
- This Little Piggy (Dexter)
- This Little Piggy (Family Guy)
- This Little Piggy (Justice League Unlimited episode)
- "This Little Piggy", a song in the album Hissing Prigs in Static Couture
