= IGoodbye =

"iGoodbye"
- iCarly episode
- Episode no.: Season 6 Episode 13
- Directed by: Steve Hoefer
- Written by: Dan Schneider
- Production code: 514–515
- Original air date: November 23, 2012

Guest appearance
- David Chisum as Colonel Steven Shay

Episode chronology
← Previous "iBust a Thief"	Next → —
- iCarly season 6

"iGoodbye" is the series finale of the American television sitcom iCarly. The episode, which aired as an hour-long special on Nickelodeon on November 23, 2012, guest starred David Chisum as Colonel Steven Shay, Carly and Spencer's father.

The episode serves as the season finale of the sixth season and the series finale to the original series. A revival series was ordered by Paramount+ in 2020, which premiered on June 17, 2021.

== Plot ==
Abridged version of the episode posted by NickRewind

Carly is expecting her father, Colonel Shay, to arrive in Seattle to escort her to the Father-Daughter Air Force Dance. She receives an electronic message saying he is unable to come. To comfort her, Spencer asks to take her to the dance, and she accepts. However, Spencer immediately becomes sick after being sneezed on by Lewbert, the apartment building's doorman, and he is unable to attend the dance. Carly is upset by this development, as this is the last year she will be young enough to attend and had been unable to attend the event with her father for the past four years. Sam convinces Freddie and Gibby - who have been at the mall getting Gibby's head re-printed (having sold it in "iLost My Head in Vegas") and saving an abused weasel - to escort Carly to the dance (while Freddie asks if him and Sam want to reunite), but Carly rejects their offer.

Despite his message, Colonel Shay arrives, and escorts Carly to the dance. Afterward, Colonel Shay informs everyone that he has to return to his base in Italy, much to Carly's disappointment as she was looking forward to spending more time with him. Colonel Shay then asks Carly to come with him. She is reluctant to go, but after encouragement from Spencer and her friends (and also Colonel Shay saying there are attractive guys), she decides to go.

Meanwhile, Spencer begins restoring a 1964 Sterling motorcycle for his friend Socko to give to his cousin Ryder for his birthday. Sam, who is into motorcycles, offers to help Spencer fix the motorcycle. He accepts and they fix up the motorcycle together; with Sam recovering one of the crucial components while Spencer recovers from his cold. However, once it is ready on the night of the dance, Spencer reveals that Socko and Ryder recently got into a fight, so Socko will not be giving his cousin the motorcycle now. Sam, at first, gets mad at Spencer for not telling her that before, but Spencer explains that he wants Sam to have the motorcycle. Touched, she happily accepts.

Carly, Sam, and Freddie head into the studio to film a final webcast where Colonel Shay is presented as a special guest. At the end of the show, Carly and Sam inform their viewers that iCarly will be on a hiatus while Carly is in Italy and (in a nod to viewers of the show) thank their fans for all their support over the years. After the show, Carly packs her things in her room downstairs with Spencer, they take the time to say goodbye and Carly thanks Spencer for everything and the siblings share a tearful hug. Freddie is packing his tech-stuff in the studio when Carly stops him by holding his hand and they kiss for the last time before she departs and upon walking out, Freddie raises his hands in triumph. Before going to the airport with her father, she finishes her goodbyes with the rest of the gang. She saves her goodbye with Sam for last and they share an emotional moment in the elevator as Sam gives her the remote from the show as a keepsake.

On the flight to Italy, Carly views a montage of archived iCarly webcasts on her laptop while everyone reminisces upon many memories over the past seasons. Sam tries out her brand-new motorcycle for the first time, riding on it happily through the South, leading to the events of Sam & Cat. Then, the episode ends with Freddie, off-screen, saying his famous closing line on the webshow, "And... we're clear."

== Cast ==
=== Main ===
- Miranda Cosgrove as Carly Shay, Spencer's younger sister and the host of her own eponymous web show titled iCarly, which has become an internet sensation.
- Jennette McCurdy as Sam Puckett, the delinquent sidekick and troublemaking best friend of Carly and co-host of iCarly.
- Nathan Kress as Freddie Benson, iCarly’s technical producer and director. He is also the techy, geeky neighbor of Carly and Spencer.
- Jerry Trainor as Spencer Shay, Carly's older brother, and a skilled artist. He is also Carly’s legal guardian.
- Noah Munck as Gibby Gibson, the odd background star of iCarly, and one of the gang’s friends.

=== Guest star ===
- David Chisum as Colonel Steven Shay, Carly and Spencer's father who is in the air force.

== Reception ==
=== Critical response ===
The A.V. Club's review found that the finale covered most of the show's usual concerns, about the importance of self-expression, the role of social media in young people's lives, and the background of "war, recession and technology"; although the first half was too slow-moving, it provides closure and the ending where Carly and Sam do one final episode of their webshow is "touching and funny". Newsday reckoned it was purely for fans, and concentrated heavily on setting up spin-offs for its cast.

=== Ratings ===
"iGoodbye" drew 6.4 million viewers, and it was the highest-rated program in November 2012 in kids and tweens. The episode's debut airing in the United Kingdom attracted 437,000 viewers, the highest ratings that any program on Nickelodeon UK had received up to that time.
