= List of awards and nominations received by Jennifer Carpenter =

Awards and nominations received by Jennifer Carpenter
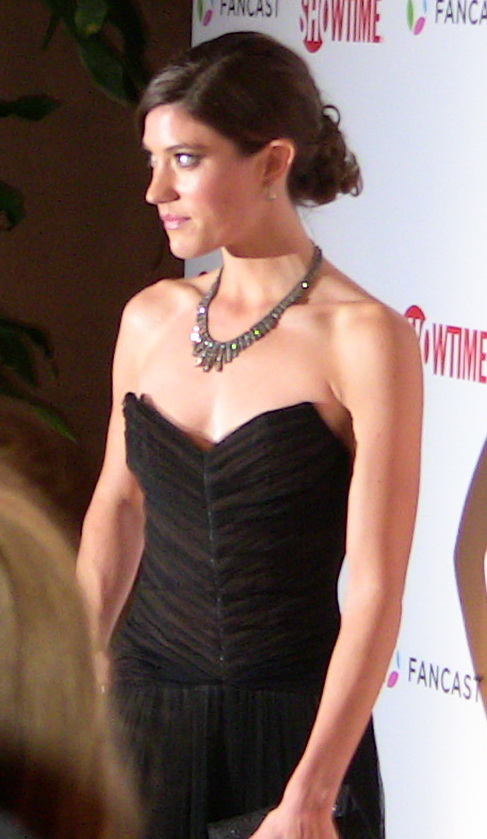
- Carpenter after the 2009 Golden Globes
Awards and nominations
| Award | Wins | Nominations |
| Critics' Choice Television Awards | 0 | 1 |
| Fangoria Chainsaw Awards | 0 | 1 |
| Fright Meter Awards | 0 | 1 |
| Gold Derby Awards | 0 | 2 |
| Golden Nymph Awards | 0 | 1 |
| IGN Awards | 0 | 1 |
| MTV Movie & TV Awards | 1 | 2 |
| Online Film & Television Association Awards | 0 | 1 |
| Prism Awards | 0 | 1 |
| Saturn Awards | 1 | 9 |
| Screen Actors Guild Awards | 0 | 4 |
| Scream Awards | 2 | 4 |

Totals (Note: Certain award groups do not simply award one winner. They acknowledge several different recipients, have runners-up, and have third place. Since this is a specific recognition and is different from losing an award, runner-up mentions are considered wins in this award tally. For simplification and to avoid errors, each award in this list has been presumed to have had a prior nomination.)
- Wins: 4
- Nominations: 28

Jennifer Carpenter is an American actress who has received 28 award nominations for roles across American film and television, winning 4 of them.

Carpenter began acting with cameos in a number of films, and received recognition with White Chicks (2004), a buddy cop crime comedy film that was her first commercial success. Her first nominations were for The Exorcism of Emily Rose (2005), an American supernatural horror film which is loosely based on the story of Anneliese Michel. Her breakout performance as the film's title character won her a MTV Movie & TV Award and a Scream Award. She received further attention for Quarantine (2008), an American found footage horror film that is a remake of the 2007 Spanish film Rec.

Carpenter received acclaim for her performance as the character Debra Morgan in Dexter (2006–2013), a crime drama television series about the eponymous protagonist who leads a double life as a forensic technician and vigilante serial killer. For Dexter, she received numerous accolades in Best Actress and Best Supporting Actress categories, winning a Saturn Award and a Scream Award, and earning nominations for a Critics' Choice Television Award and four Screen Actors Guild Awards.

Carpenter's continued television roles include Rebecca Harris in Limitless (2015–2016), an American comedy drama series continuing the 2011 film of the same name, Erica Shephard in The Enemy Within (2019), an American drama series, and Mamie Fossett in 1923 (2025), a Western drama prequel to Yellowstone. She also voiced Sonya Blade in two direct-to-video Mortal Kombat films: Scorpion's Revenge (2020) and Battle of the Realms (2021).

Carpenter reprises the character of Debra Morgan in Dexter: New Blood (2021–2022), a miniseries set ten years after the events of Dexter's finale.

== Major associations ==
=== Critics' Choice Television Awards ===
The Critics' Choice Television Awards were presented annually from 2011 to 2016 by the Broadcast Film Critics Association for outstanding achievements in the television industry. Carpenter has one nomination.

| Year | Nominated work | Category | Result | Ref. |
|---|---|---|---|---|
| 2013 | Dexter | Best Supporting Actress in a Drama Series | Nominated | |

=== Screen Actors Guild Awards ===
The Screen Actors Guild Awards are presented annually since 1995 by the Screen Actors Guild‐American Federation of Television and Radio Artists for excellent achievements in film and television. Carpenter has four nominations.

| Year | Nominated work | Category | Result | Ref. |
|---|---|---|---|---|
| 2009 | Dexter | Outstanding Performance by an Ensemble in a Drama Series | Nominated | |
| 2010 | Dexter | Outstanding Performance by an Ensemble in a Drama Series | Nominated | |
| 2011 | Dexter | Outstanding Performance by an Ensemble in a Drama Series | Nominated | |
| 2012 | Dexter | Outstanding Performance by an Ensemble in a Drama Series | Nominated | |

== Miscellaneous awards ==
| Year | Nominated work | Association | Category | Result | Ref. |
|---|---|---|---|---|---|
| 2006 | The Exorcism of Emily Rose | Fangoria Chainsaw Awards | Best Supporting Actress | Nominated | |
| 2006 | The Exorcism of Emily Rose | MTV Movie & TV Awards | Best Breakthrough Performance | Nominated | |
| 2006 | The Exorcism of Emily Rose | MTV Movie & TV Awards | Best Scared-As-Shit Performance | Won | |
| 2006 | The Exorcism of Emily Rose | Saturn Awards | Best Supporting Actress | Nominated | |
| 2006 | The Exorcism of Emily Rose | Scream Awards | Breakout Performance | Won | |
| 2007 | Dexter | Saturn Awards | Best Supporting Actress on Television | Nominated | |
| 2008 | Quarantine | Fright Meter Awards | Best Actress | Nominated | |
| 2008 | Dexter | Saturn Awards | Best Supporting Actress on Television | Nominated | |
| 2009 | Dexter | IGN Awards | Best Performance | Nominated | |
| 2009 | Dexter | Saturn Awards | Best Supporting Actress on Television | Won | |
| 2009 | Quarantine | Scream Awards | Best Horror Actress | Nominated | |
| 2009 | Dexter | Scream Awards | Best Supporting Actress | Won | |
| 2010 | Dexter | Scream Awards | Best Supporting Actress | Nominated | |
| 2010 | Dexter | Gold Derby Awards | Drama Supporting Actress | Nominated | |
| 2010 | Dexter | Golden Nymph Awards | Outstanding Actress in a Drama Series | Nominated | |
| 2010 | Dexter | Saturn Awards | Best Supporting Actress on Television | Nominated | |
| 2011 | Dexter | Saturn Awards | Best Supporting Actress on Television | Nominated | |
| 2012 | Dexter | Saturn Awards | Best Supporting Actress on Television | Nominated | |
| 2013 | Dexter | Gold Derby Awards | Drama Supporting Actress | Nominated | |
| 2013 | Dexter | Saturn Awards | Best Supporting Actress on Television | Nominated | |
| 2013 | Dexter | Online Film & Television Association Awards | Best Supporting Actress in a Drama Series | Nominated | |
| 2014 | Dexter | Prism Awards | Female Performance in a Drama Series Multi-Episode Storyline | Nominated | |
| 2014 | Dexter | Saturn Awards | Best Actress on Television | Nominated | |
