= This Little Piggy (Dexter) =

- Dexter episode
- Episode no.: Season 8 Episode 5
- Directed by: Romeo Tirone
- Written by: Scott Reynolds
- Cinematography by: Jeffrey Jur
- Editing by: Amy E. Duddleston
- Original release date: July 28, 2013
- Running time: 48 minutes

Guest appearances
- Charlotte Rampling as Dr. Evelyn Vogel (special guest star); Sean Patrick Flanery as Jacob Elway; Aaron McCusker as A.J. Yates; Bethany Joy Lenz as Cassie Jollenston; Sam Underwood as Zach Hamilton; Dora Madison Burge as Niki Walters; John D'Aquino as Ed Hamilton; Rolando Molina as Armando

Episode chronology
← Previous "Scar Tissue"	Next → "A Little Reflection"
- Dexter season 8

"This Little Piggy" is the fifth episode of the eighth season of the American crime drama television series Dexter. It is the 89th overall episode of the series and was written by supervising producer Scott Reynolds, and directed by Romeo Tirone. It originally aired on Showtime on July 28, 2013.

Set in Miami, the series centers on Dexter Morgan, a forensic technician specializing in bloodstain pattern analysis for the fictional Miami Metro Police Department, who leads a secret parallel life as a vigilante serial killer, hunting down murderers who have not been adequately punished by the justice system due to corruption or legal technicalities. In the episode, Dexter and Debra must work together to locate Vogel after Yates kidnaps her, while Quinn tries to get a wealthy family investigated for Norma Rivera's murder.

According to Nielsen Media Research, the episode was seen by an estimated 2.55 million household viewers and gained a 1.2 ratings share among adults aged 18–49. The episode received mixed reviews from critics, with many polarized over the resolution to the previous episode's cliffhanger.

== Plot ==
During a new session with Vogel (Charlotte Rampling), Dexter (Michael C. Hall) scolds Debra (Jennifer Carpenter) for almost having them killed, claiming he could have left Harrison as an orphan. Vogel considers that the event was hitting "rock bottom" for Debra, and that things should finally improve in their relationship. Dexter brushes it off and abandons therapy, setting to catch Yates (Aaron McCusker).

Miami Metro continues investigating the murder of Norma Rivera, concluding that she willingly had sex with another person before her death. Witnesses state that she was having an affair with her boss, Ed Hamilton (John D'Aquino), and he is deemed a prime suspect. When Ed is questioned, he confirms the affair but security cameras provide an alibi to his innocence. Dexter is approached by Ed's son, Zach (Sam Underwood), who repeatedly asks questions over Norma's murder. Masuka (C. S. Lee) runs a DNA test on Niki (Dora Madison Burge), confirming she is his daughter. Worried that she might be contacting him for his money, he asks Debra to do a background check on her.

While the police raids Yates' house, Yates breaks into Vogel's house and kidnaps her. The police find his underground lair and multiple graves on the property. Yates broke each victim's toes, one week at a time, before finally murdering them. At the scene, Dexter talks with Debra over the incident and she states that she saved him at the last minute because she simply could not live without him. A vendor tells Quinn (Desmond Harrington) that he saw Zach near the crime scene where Norma was murdered at the time of her death, but he later changes his story. Matthews (Geoff Pierson) tells Quinn not to bring Zach in for questioning, despite Quinn suggesting the Hamilton family could have blackmailed the vendor, ostensibly because "there's no reason to make enemies unless we really have to", since, as Matthews stated earlier in the episode, the Hamilton's are "good friends to Miami Metro", whilst also implying that Quinn's potential promotion to sergeant may be at risk if he pursues the issue.

Jamie (Aimee Garcia) sets up a double date with Quinn, hoping to pair Dexter with Cassie (Bethany Joy Lenz). Dexter initially refuses, but is forced to stay when Jamie threatens to quit as Harrison's babysitter. When Debra calls to inspect vacant houses, Dexter convinces Cassie in rescheduling a new date so he can leave. Vogel manages to call Dexter, providing her with clues over her location. Debra gets Elway (Sean Patrick Flanery) to track the phone call's location, saving Vogel. Yates tries to kill Debra, until Dexter impales him. Vogel is delighted that Dexter and Debra put aside their differences to help her. That night, Dexter, Debra and Vogel dump Yates' body in the ocean, with Dexter referring to Debra and Vogel as his "family."

== Production ==
=== Development ===
The episode was written by supervising producer Scott Reynolds, and directed by Romeo Tirone. This was Reynolds' tenth writing credit, and Tirone's sixth directing credit.

== Reception ==
=== Viewers ===
In its original American broadcast, "This Little Piggy" was seen by an estimated 2.55 million household viewers with a 1.2 in the 18–49 demographics. This means that 1.2 percent of all households with televisions watched the episode. This was a slight increase in viewership from the previous episode, which was watched by an estimated 2.47 million household viewers with a 1.2 in the 18–49 demographics.

=== Critical reviews ===
"This Little Piggy" received mixed reviews from critics. Matt Fowler of IGN gave the episode a "great" 8.5 out of 10, and wrote, "There was a bit of a mini-finale feeling to "This Little Piggy," as it (for now) seemed to close off the Vogel/Brain Surgeon story. I wasn't expecting this all to play out as a mini-arc, but that's what happened. It also shut down - perhaps - yet another "How will Dexter end?" theory, which involved Deb killing Dex or Dex killing Deb. I mean, it still could play out like that, but as of now the two of them have just turned a huge corner, relationship-wise. They managed to come back together as brother and sister, with Deb being pulled out of an abyss of depression and despair. It would seem silly to, somehow, tear them apart again."

Joshua Alston of The A.V. Club gave the episode a "C" grade and wrote, "I still don't understand how a show about retributive justice manages to be so terrified of ambiguity, especially in its eighth season, when it's playing to audiences who have clearly demonstrated an affinity for the show and its characters. The fun of speculating about what will happen in a show about an anti-hero is considering the wide range of fates that could befall a character deserving of his or her comeuppance. But Dexter doesn't appear to have that range, and unless I'm being set up for a last-minute gut punch, it will end with a bang, not a whimper."

Richard Rys of Vulture gave the episode a 3 star rating out of 5 and wrote, "After the season's best episode last week, this chapter was the weakest. That's relative, of course — though we're not quite halfway to the end, it's been highly satisfying so far. But even with the heavy-handed family theme, there were still enough clever lines and suspenseful turns to keep the story chugging along." Kevin Fitzpatrick of ScreenCrush wrote, "Overall "This Little Piggy" brings plenty of catharsis in seeing Dexter united with both Deb and Vogel as a family, and even a humanizing moment for Masuka along the way, though few of the storylines going forward seem as strong as those wrapped up here tonight."

James Hibberd of Entertainment Weekly wrote, "Maybe everything we've seen so far will pay off later. Maybe all these various threads will tie together into a stunning knotty climax. And there have been developments this season - Deb and Dex's relationship has continued to evolve. But I wish the final season was increasing stakes and tension every week and felt more like a cohesive story instead of a compartmentalized series of new killers for Dex to dispatch. There was the Brain Surgeon (and his minion), now there's the Maid Murder, and the return of Hannah McKay is still waiting in the wings. Plus there's the Jake Elway character who will eventually be doing... something other than drinking electrolytes, presumably." Cory Barker of TV.com wrote, "This season is becoming quite the challenge, both to watch and to review. I'm surprised that this is where Dexter is five episodes into its final season, and there's definitely some value in being surprising eight years in. And again, it's quite likely that weird stuff is happening almost entirely because Vogel is really, really good at her job. But the show might need to level out for an episode or two before I'm totally sold on where this is all headed."

Andrea Reiher of Zap2it wrote, "We're also wondering where Zach Hamilton fits into all this. He killed Norma Rivera and clearly is some kind of young psychopath like Dexter was. Will he be brought into the fold somehow?" Alan Danzis of BuddyTV wrote, "In the final season, it's great to see Dexter exploring matters of family and what defines one. It's just a shame that it's doing so at such a deliberately slow, uneventful pace."

Billy Grifter of Den of Geek wrote, "Last week, I was majorly disappointed in the shabby crash sequence and a perceived lack of proper connections between events. A week is a long time in La-La-Land, it seems, because almost everything in "This Little Piggy", I pretty much adored." Matt Richenthal of TV Fanatic gave the episode a 3.3 star rating out of 5 and wrote, "Despite the fact that Deb nearly killed Dexter last week, and the siblings ended up as close as ever to conclude "This Little Piggy," not a lot actually went down on the most disappointing episode to date of Dexter Season 8."

Alex Moaba of HuffPost wrote, "Ah, that's more like it. With Dexter and Deb finally at peace, this episode of Dexter felt like it was back in its comfort zone, which proves the week-old television maxim: If you want to pull a show out of a rut, sometimes you have to drive into a lake." Television Without Pity gave the episode a "B" grade.
