= Make Your Own Kind of Music (Dexter) =

- Dexter episode
- Episode no.: Season 8 Episode 9
- Directed by: John Dahl
- Written by: Karen Campbell
- Cinematography by: Jeffrey Jur
- Editing by: Keith Henderson
- Original release date: August 25, 2013
- Running time: 55 minutes

Guest appearances
- Yvonne Strahovski as Hannah McKay (special guest star); Charlotte Rampling as Dr. Evelyn Vogel (special guest star); Sean Patrick Flanery as Jacob Elway; Nicole LaLiberte as Arlene Schram; Kenny Johnson as Max Clayton; Dora Madison Burge as Niki Walters; Darri Ingólfsson as Oliver Saxon

Episode chronology
← Previous "Are We There Yet?"	Next → "Goodbye Miami"
- Dexter season 8

"Make Your Own Kind of Music" is the ninth episode of the eighth season of the American crime drama television series Dexter. It is the 93rd overall episode of the series and was written by Karen Campbell, and directed by John Dahl. It originally aired on Showtime on August 25, 2013.

Set in Miami, the series centers on Dexter Morgan, a forensic technician specializing in bloodstain pattern analysis for the fictional Miami Metro Police Department, who leads a secret parallel life as a vigilante serial killer, hunting down murderers who have not been adequately punished by the justice system due to corruption or legal technicalities. In the episode, Dexter discovers that Zach's killer is related to Vogel's past, while a U.S. Marshal arrives to capture Hannah.

According to Nielsen Media Research, the episode was seen by an estimated 2.28 million household viewers and gained a 1.1 ratings share among adults aged 18–49. The episode received mixed reviews from critics, who criticized the Brain Surgeon reveal, pacing and dialogue.

== Plot ==
Dexter (Michael C. Hall) and Vogel (Charlotte Rampling) investigate Zach's studio to find any evidence that could help them solve his murder. They find hair, possibly from his killer, and Dexter leaves to check the DNA. Vogel finds that Dexter is planning to stay with Hannah (Yvonne Strahovski), and wonders if anything good will come out of it.

Elway (Sean Patrick Flanery) meets with U.S. Marshal Max Clayton (Kenny Johnson) after Elway reported Hannah's sudden appearance in Miami. While Elway is not allowed to accompany Clayton, he is told he will still receive the reward if she is captured. When Quinn (Desmond Harrington) discloses his opinion that Zach killed Norma and Cassie, Debra (Jennifer Carpenter) confronts Dexter for his road trip with Hannah and Zach. He reveals Zach is dead, confusing her. When he runs the DNA test, Dexter is surprised when he finds that the killer is related to Vogel. She finally reveals that she had two sons, Daniel and Richard, and she sent Daniel to a mental institution after killing Richard, and he was pronounced dead in a fire incident. Dexter suspects Daniel faked his death, and has now become the Brain Surgeon.

Dexter uses facial recognition to age a picture of a young Daniel, and is astonished to learn that it strongly resembles Saxon (Darri Ingólfsson), Cassie's boyfriend. He investigates Saxon's background, and discovers that he took the identity of a real Saxon, a kid who died. When he is informed that Clayton is looking for Hannah, Dexter takes Hannah to visit Arlene (Nicole LaLiberte) to retrieve a suitcase of money. Hannah is forced to hide when Clayton shows up, and Dexter backs her up from his suspicions. Debra helps Quinn with Cassie's murder, and they question Saxon, who provides a contradiction to what Jamie (Aimee Garcia) told her. Quinn suddenly kisses her, but they both regret it.

As he works on getting Hannah out of Miami, Dexter convinces Debra to let her stay at her house for a few days, while warning her about Saxon. Hannah tells Dexter that she wants to move to Argentina, and he agrees to leave with her and Harrison. He retrieves a soda can from Saxon's vacant apartment, and his DNA confirms he is Daniel. Vogel does not want him to kill Saxon, instead convincing him to help have Saxon sent to a mental institution, but Dexter secretly plans to kill him. After drugging Vogel, Dexter leaves for a scheduled meeting with Saxon. However, Saxon does not fall for his trap and leaves after puncturing Dexter's car tire. Dexter eventually makes his way to Vogel's house, but she is angry with him for drugging her. She makes it clear she cannot trust him anymore, while Dexter reiterates he will kill Saxon if given the chance. Dexter leaves, unaware that Saxon has already reunited with Vogel, who has accepted him into her home.

== Production ==
=== Development ===
The episode was written by Karen Campbell, and directed by John Dahl. This was Campbell's fourth writing credit, and Dahl's 16th directing credit.

== Reception ==
=== Viewers ===
In its original American broadcast, "Make Your Own Kind of Music" was seen by an estimated 2.28 million household viewers with a 1.1 in the 18–49 demographics. This means that 1.1 percent of all households with televisions watched the episode. This was a 17% increase in viewership from the previous episode, which was watched by an estimated 1.94 million household viewers with a 0.9 in the 18–49 demographics.

=== Critical reviews ===
"Make Your Own Kind of Music" received mixed reviews from critics. Matt Fowler of IGN gave the episode a "good" 7.5 out of 10, and wrote, ""Make Your Own Kind of Music" finally put a face to the Brain Surgeon, and gave Dexter a "last mission"-style target, but it came at the expense of logic, suspense, and Evelyn Vogel. I do hope things get darker and harsher from here on out. No, I don't need things to be randomly perverse or needlessly dour, but I certainly don't want to spend the last three episodes trudging through Dexter territory that's already been explored. And most of all, I'd hate to think that this particular world is being held at a boring status quo so that Showtime - should they decide to - can have their Dexter spinoff series."

Joshua Alston of The A.V. Club gave the episode a "D" grade and wrote, "The episode is a complete mess from the beginning, starting from the opening scene of Dexter and Hannah enjoying some cuddle time. Even the acting didn't seem right, and Michael C. Hall's performance is one of the few reliable aspects of this show. But when he does his quivering tone, mumble-mouthed speech to communicate how much he loves Hannah Dexter, I want to do to my television what Dexter wants to do to the Brain Surgeon. Speaking of the Brain Surgeon, surprise, he's someone no one cares about."

Richard Rys of Vulture gave the episode a 3 star rating out of 5 and wrote, "Of course, everyone's learning this now for the purposes of storytelling, not realism. That doesn't mean the story itself is great. Although this episode was a step up from last week (and the week before), the show still doesn't feel like it's ramping up to the epic finish it deserves." Kevin Fitzpatrick of ScreenCrush wrote, "Don't gets us wrong, we're glad to see the final season develop its ultimate trajectory at last, though three episodes to turn around our investment in the ending seems like a tall order for a series so uncertain of what it wants for its own main character."

James Hibberd of Entertainment Weekly wrote, "You know what would have given Dex a motive? If the brain surgeon had killed anybody meaningful on this show. That would be a motive, that would give this story some juice. But I'm starting to get the feeling the core cast isn't going anywhere (aside from, potentially, Dex and Harrison), with the whole spin-off idea brewing." Cory Barker of TV.com wrote, "Ultimately, what's weird about this season is that amid all the starts and stops, it just keeps building, only I have no clue to where or to what it's building to. I could guess, but that's gone very poorly thus far, and it's not even like there's mystery in the air. I've never experienced a final season that's so weirdly paced, simultaneously content to wait out the clock and to throw a slew of half-baked but interesting ideas at the audience. It's not even frustrating, it's mostly fascinating, or something."

Andrea Reiher of Zap2it wrote, "There are three episodes left, leaving plenty of time for Dexter's life to go down the tubes, which makes us very sad. But for now, we're keeping our eyes on the living-with-Hannah-and-Harrison-in-Argentina prize." Alan Danzis of BuddyTV wrote, "are those answers satisfying from a dramatic perspective? While it's always challenging to get the audience to care about new characters, it just seems like past seasons' bad guys have had more charisma and depth than the Brain Surgeon/Oliver Saxon does this season."

Nick Harley of Den of Geek gave the episode a 2 star rating out of 5 and wrote, "There's only three episodes left, and if this weren't the final season of Dexter, I think I would give up on it right now. I can no longer hope for this show to return to its former glory or even expect it to have passable moments. So much of “Make Your Own Kind of Music” was bad." Miranda Wicker of TV Fanatic gave the episode a 3.5 star rating out of 5 and wrote, "It may not be clear to Dexter yet, but after tonight it's certainly clear to me how and why Dr. Vogel became so fascinated with psychopaths. And it's not because she's trying to cure them. Or even understand them."

Alex Moaba of HuffPost wrote, "All in all, "Make Your Own Kind Music" was a suspenseful episode that did a great job of setting up the series' final three hours. It gave me that excited feeling of watching a well-executed Dexter climax come together down the stretch. And at this point, for this show, that's all we can ask for." Television Without Pity gave the episode a "C" grade.
