= David Chisum =

American actor (born 1970)

- Born: David Hines Chisum; February 5, 1971 (age 55); Livonia, Michigan, U.S.
- Occupation: Actor
- Years active: 1995–2018
- Spouse: Aisha Nadera Baker
- Children: 2

David Hines Chisum (born February 5, 1971) is an American actor.

== Early life ==
Chisum was born in Livonia, Michigan and raised in Fullerton, California. In high school, he was a star quarterback in addition to performing in various school productions.

== Career ==
From February 9, 2007, to April 22, 2008, Chisum portrayed Miles Laurence on the ABC Daytime soap opera One Life to Live. From 2009 to 2010, Chisum and actress Rebecca Staab starred in eight 35-second webisodes airing each week during the sixth season of the ABC television series Desperate Housewives. In 2012, he guest starred in the final iCarly episode "iGoodbye" portraying Steven Shay, the father of Carly and Spencer.

== Personal life ==
Chisum is married to Aisha Nadera Baker. They have two children, a son, Aiden, and a daughter, Zoie.

== Filmography ==
Year	Title	Role	Notes
1995	Ned and Stacey	Ted	(TV series, 1 episode: "Ned and Stace")
1996; 2003	JAG	Video Tech/Petty Officer Dott	(TV series, 2 episodes)
1996	EZ Streets	Close-Cropped	(TV series, 1 episode: "Every Picture Tells a Story")
1997	The Burning Zone	Mac	(TV series, 1 episode: "The Last Endless Summer")
1997	Sliders	Paramedic	(TV series, 1 episode: "The Breeder")
1997	USA High	Wallace	(TV series, 2 episodes)
1998	12 Bucks	Cheesy	
1999	Melrose Place	Jim Rogers	(TV series, 1 episode: "McBride's Head Revisited")
1999	3rd Rock from the Sun	Chip Caswell	(TV series, 1 episode: "Dial M for Dick")
1999	Sunset Beach	Bret	(TV series, 1 episode: "Unknown")
1999	Port Charles	Trent	(TV series, 2 episodes)
2000	Charmed	Micah	(TV series, 1 episode: "All Halliwell's Eve")
2001	Hollywood 7	Jeffrey Swinger	(TV series, 1 episode: "Public Relations")
2001	My Life as a Troll		
2001	Becker	Good Looking Guy	(TV series, 1 episode; "Breakfast of Champions")
2003	The Practice	Public Counsel Jack Pope	(TV series, 1 episode: "Special Deliveries")
2003	Fastlane	Porter	(TV series, 1 episode: "Overkill")
2003	Dragnet	Ted Willis	(TV series, 1 episode: "The Little Guy")
2003	Home	Matty Oaks	
2004	A Carol Christmas	Frank	
2004	The District	Office Loman	(TV series, 1 episode: "Breath of Life")
2004	24	Phil	(TV series, 2 episodes)
2004	Las Vegas	Craig Katz	(TV series, 1 episode: "Catch of the Day")
2004	Angel in the Family	David	
2005	Cold Case	Dennis Hargrove	(TV series, 1 episode: "Creatures of the Night")
2005	The Bad Girl's Guide	Nick	(TV series, 1 episode: "The Guide to Doing It Now")
2007–2008	One Life to Live	Miles Laurence	(TV series, 138 episodes)
2007	Flight of the Living Dead	Truman Burrows	
2007	Dark Mirror	Jim Martin	
2008	The Onion Movie	Penis Pal Glen	
2008	The Clique	William Block	
2009	CSI: NY	Mayor Kaplan	(TV series, 1 episode: "The Party's Over")
2009	90210	Greg	(TV series, 2 episodes)
2009	Desperate Housewives	Lance	(TV series, 1 episode: "Everybody Ought to Have a Maid")
2010	CSI: Miami	Keith Palmer	(TV series, 1 episode: "Miami, We Have a Problem")
2010	In Plain Sight	Liam Skyes	(TV series, 1 episode: "Son of Mann")
2010	The Glades	Richard Slayton	(TV series, 1 episode: "The Girlfriend Experience")
2010	Undercovers		(TV series, 1 episode: "Instructions")
2011	Criminal Minds	Don Chamberlain	(TV series, 1 episode: "Hanley Waters")
2012	Drew Peterson: Untouchable	Rick	
2012	Castle	Thomas Gage	(TV series, 2 episodes)
2012	American Horror Story: Asylum	Jim Brown	(TV mini-series, 1 episode: "I Am Anne Frank, Part 2")
2012	iCarly	Colonel Steven Shay	(TV sitcom, series finale: "iGoodbye")
2013	CSI: Crime Scene Investigation	Agent Smith	(TV series, 1 episode: "Double Fault")
2013	Dexter	Kevin Wyman	(TV series, 1 episode: "A Little Reflection")
2014	Unknown Caller	Colin Miller	
2014	Summer Snow	Dan Benson	
2014	Black Box	Josh Black	
2014	Stalker	Chris Powell	(TV series, 1 episode: "Phobia")
2015–2016	NCIS	Dr. David Woods	(TV series, 2 episodes)
2015	Perception	Professor Gardner	(TV series, 1 episode: "Romeo")
2015	Proof	Dr. Daniel Powell	(TV series, 1 episode: "Showdown")
2015	Checkmate	Allen	
2016	Major Crimes	Donald Irwin	(TV series, 1 episode: "Skin Deep")
2016	Timeless	William Barret Travis	(TV series, 1 episode: "The Alamo")
2016	Shark Ninja: Coffee Bar Television Infomercial	Barista	
2016	Supernatural	Jefferson Rooney/Lucifer	(TV series, 1 episode: "LOTUS")
2016	Shooter	Jim Wallingford	(TV series, 3 episodes)
2017–2018	Supergirl	Ronald Collins	(TV series, 2 episodes)
2017	Grey's Anatomy	Judge Jeffrey King	(TV series, 1 episode: "Come on Down to My Boat, Baby")
2018	UnREAL	Tom Miller	(TV series, 1 episode: "Confront")
2018	SEAL Team	Brett Baxter	(TV series, 1 episode: "Never Say Die")
2018	S.W.A.T.	Tucker	(TV series, 1 episode: "Inheritance")
