= Jace Richdale =

American producer and writer

Jace Richdale is an American producer and writer. He served as co-executive producer for seasons 5 and 6 of The Simpsons and wrote the season five episode "Burns' Heir". He was a part of the Simpsons writing staff during seasons 5, 6, 9 and 10. Other writing credits include Dexter, Family Ties, Get a Life, and The Oblongs. He has also produced episodes of The Oblongs, Oliver Beene, and the movie Wiener Park.

He was married to fellow writer Jennifer Crittenden for three years; they separated in 1998. He is now married to Allegra Growdon.

In 2012, Richdale was nominated for the Writers Guild of America Award for Best Screenplay – Episodic Drama for his writing for the episode "Just Let Go" for the sixth season of Dexter.
