= Jennifer Carpenter =

American actress (born 1979)

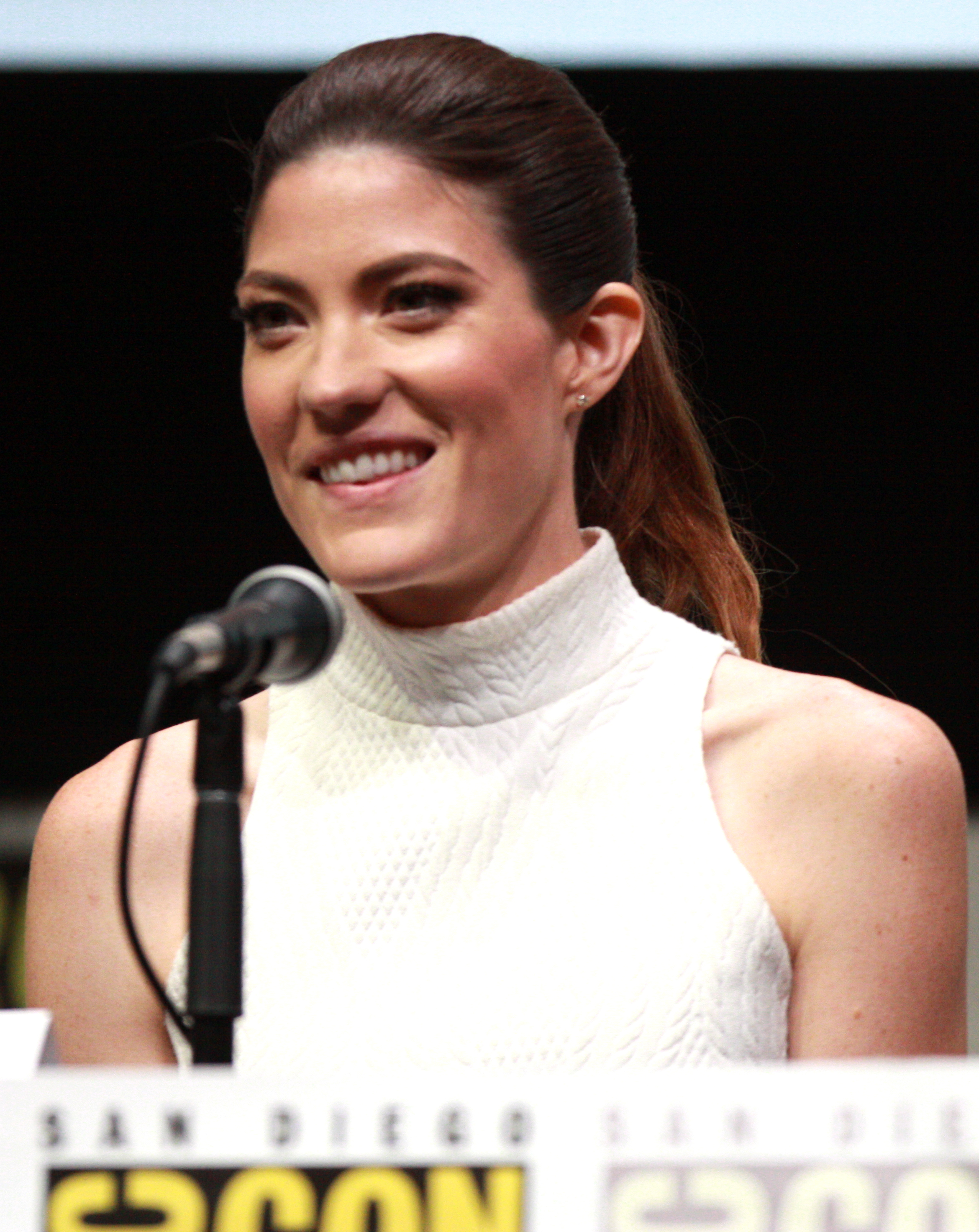
- Carpenter in 2013
- Born: December 7, 1979 (age 46); Louisville, Kentucky, U.S.
- Education: Juilliard School (BFA)
- Occupation: Actress
- Years active: 1998–present
- Spouses: Michael C. Hall (m. 2008; div. 2011) Seth Avett (m. 2016)
- Children: 1

Jennifer Carpenter (born December 7, 1979) is an American actress. Her early film roles include the cult comedy White Chicks (2004) and the supernatural horror The Exorcism of Emily Rose (2005), with the latter establishing her as a scream queen. She rose to prominence for playing Debra Morgan in the crime drama series Dexter (2006–2013), which she reprised in the miniseries Dexter: New Blood (2021–2022). Her accolades include an MTV Movie Award and a Saturn Award, and nominations for a Critics' Choice Television Award and four Screen Actors Guild Awards.

Carpenter's television roles beyond Dexter include the comedy drama series Limitless (2015–2016) and the drama series The Enemy Within (2019). Her film roles include the found footage horror film Quarantine (2008) and Sonya Blade in the direct-to-video Mortal Kombat films Scorpion's Revenge (2020) and Battle of the Realms (2021).

== Early life and education ==
Carpenter was born in Louisville, Kentucky, the daughter of Catherine (née Mitchell) and Robert Carpenter. She attended St. Raphael the Archangel and then Sacred Heart Academy. She trained at the Walden Theatre Conservatory program, and later at New York City's Juilliard School (Drama Division Group 31: 1998–2002).

Before graduation, she was cast in the 2002 Broadway revival of Arthur Miller's The Crucible.

== Career ==
Carpenter received recognition for her role in Keenen Ivory Wayans' comedy White Chicks, released in 2004. While the film was initially panned by critics, it was a commercial success and garnered a cult following. David Rooney of Variety called her appealing and sophisticated.

Carpenter first attracted critical attention for her performance in The Exorcism of Emily Rose. She was cast in the film at the suggestion of co-star Laura Linney, who previously worked with Carpenter in a play. Roger Ebert of the Chicago Sun-Times called her performance "grueling" and Paul Arendt of BBC believed the film was effective "thanks to a committed performance from Jennifer Carpenter". She took home the 2006 MTV Movie Award for Best Scared-As-Shit Performance and won Breakout Performer at the 2006 Scream Awards.

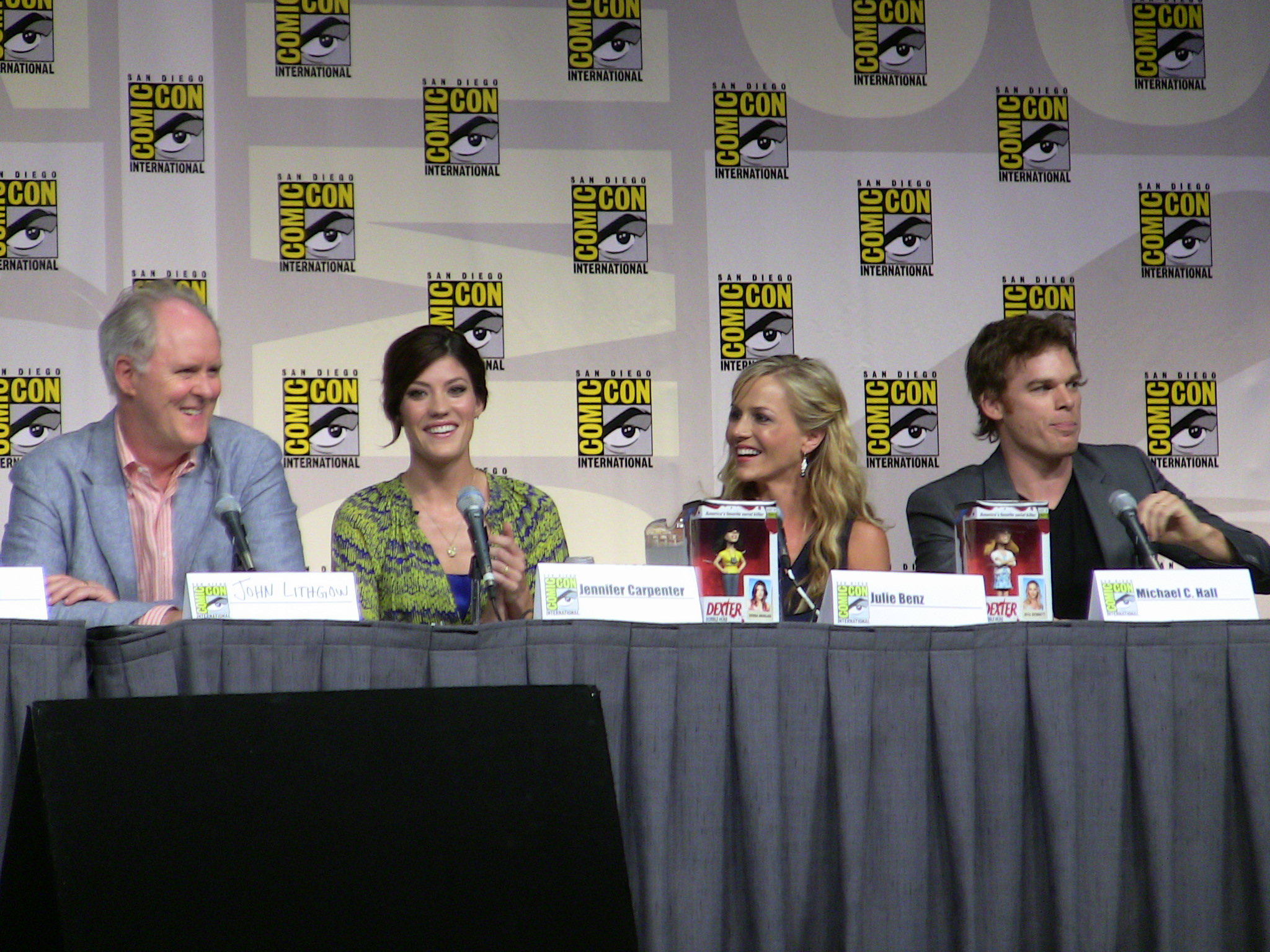
(L-R): John Lithgow, Jennifer Carpenter, Julie Benz and Michael C. Hall at San Diego Comic-Con in July 2009

Carpenter played the role of Debra Morgan in the Showtime crime drama television series Dexter, which premiered October 1, 2006. Her portrayal of the title character's adoptive sister impressed a number of critics, with Australian journalist Jack Marx describing her portrayal of "cool and clumsy" Debra as "so perfect that many viewers appear to have mistaken the character's flaws for the actor's". For Dexter, she received numerous accolades in Best Actress and Best Supporting Actress categories, winning a Saturn Award from eight consecutive nominations, and earning nominations for a Critics' Choice Television Award and four Screen Actors Guild Awards.

In 2008, Carpenter starred in Quarantine, an American remake of the 2007 Spanish horror film Rec, about a deadly zombie virus outbreak in an apartment complex. It received mixed reviews from critics but was a moderate commercial success. Staff at Bloody Disgusting wrote, "if Quarantine is remembered for anything it will be remembered for another gut-wrenching, physically draining performance from Jennifer Carpenter."

In 2011, she starred in the off-Broadway play Gruesome Playground Injuries at Second Stage Theatre and had a guest appearance on the CBS drama The Good Wife.

In January 2014, it was announced that Carpenter would star in a new ABC drama Sea of Fire, playing FBI agent Leah Pierce. However, the show was not picked up as a series. In August 2014, it was announced that she would provide the voice of Juli Kidman in the survival horror video game The Evil Within, marking her first video game appearance. The game was released in October 2014, and Carpenter provided voicework for two of The Evil Within's DLC chapters, "The Assignment" and "The Consequence", which featured Juli Kidman as the playable protagonist. However, Carpenter did not reprise the role in the game's sequel, The Evil Within 2, and her character was recast.

In early 2015, Carpenter was cast in the CBS drama series Limitless.

On July 13, 2021, Showtime confirmed that Carpenter would reprise her role of Debra Morgan in a 10-episode limited series, Dexter: New Blood, with Clyde Phillips returning as showrunner. The series premiered on November 7, 2021.

In 2025, Carpenter played the recurring role of Mamie Fossett in the Western drama series 1923, a prequel to Yellowstone. She told The Hollywood Reporter that it was a role she wanted "like I haven't wanted anything in a very long time".

== Personal life ==
In 2007, she began dating her Dexter co-star Michael C. Hall. They eloped on New Year's Eve 2008 in California and publicly appeared together for the first time as a married couple at the 66th Golden Globe Awards in January 2009. In December 2010, Hall and Carpenter released a statement announcing that they had filed for divorce, citing irreconcilable differences, after having been separated "for some time". The divorce was finalized in December 2011; the two remain very close friends.

On February 10, 2015, it was announced that Carpenter and musician Seth Avett were engaged and expecting their first child. Later that year, Carpenter gave birth to a son. She had been eight-and-a-half months pregnant when shooting the pilot episode of Limitless. Carpenter and Avett married in May 2016.

== Filmography ==
=== Film ===
| Year | Title | Role | Notes |
|---|---|---|---|
| 2001 | People Are Dead | Angela's friend #2 | |
| 2003 | Ash Tuesday | Samantha | |
| 2004 | D.E.B.S. | Hysterical student | |
| 2004 | White Chicks | Lisa Anderson | |
| 2005 | Last Days of America | Friend in New York #2 | |
| 2005 | Lethal Eviction | Sarah/Tessa/Beth | Also known as Grayson Arms |
| 2005 | The Exorcism of Emily Rose | Emily Rose | |
| 2006 | The Dog Problem | Redheaded waitress | |
| 2007 | Battle in Seattle | Sam | |
| 2008 | Quarantine | Angela Vidal | |
| 2010 | Faster | Nan Porterman | |
| 2011 | Seeking Justice | Trudy | |
| 2012 | Gone | Sharon Ames | |
| 2012 | The Factory | Kelsey Walker | |
| 2012 | Ex-Girlfriends | Kate | Executive producer |
| 2014 | Avengers Confidential: Black Widow & Punisher | Natasha Romanoff / Black Widow (voice) | English version |
| 2014 | The Devil's Hand | Rebekah | |
| 2015 | Scooby-Doo! and Kiss: Rock and Roll Mystery | Chikara (voice) | Direct-to-video |
| 2017 | Brawl in Cell Block 99 | Lauren Thomas | |
| 2018 | Batman: Gotham by Gaslight | Selina Kyle (voice) | Direct-to-video |
| 2018 | Dragged Across Concrete | Kelly Summer | |
| 2020 | Mortal Kombat Legends: Scorpion's Revenge | Sonya Blade (voice) | Direct-to-video |
| 2021 | Mortal Kombat Legends: Battle of the Realms | Sonya Blade (voice) | Direct-to-video |
| 2021 | A Mouthful of Air | Lucy | |
| TBA | Eleven Days | TBA | Post-production |

=== Television ===
| Year | Title | Role | Notes |
|---|---|---|---|
| 2005 | Queen B | Kristen | Television film |
| 2006–2013 | Dexter | Debra Morgan | Main role |
| 2009 | Dexter: Early Cuts | Debra Morgan | 2 episodes |
| 2011 | The Good Wife | Pamela Raker | Episode: "Parenting Made Easy" |
| 2011–2013 | Pound Puppies | Pepper (voice) | 5 episodes |
| 2014 | Robot Chicken | Voices | Episode: "Victoria's Secret of NIMH" |
| 2015–2016 | Limitless | Rebecca Harris | Main role |
| 2019 | The Enemy Within | Erica Shepherd | Main role |
| 2021–2022 | Dexter: New Blood | Debra Morgan | Miniseries; main role |
| 2025 | 1923 | Mamie Fossett | Recurring role |

=== Video games ===
| Year | Title | Role | Notes |
|---|---|---|---|
| 2014 | The Evil Within | Juli Kidman | Also The Assignment and The Consequence DLC |

== Awards and nominations ==
Carpenter's awards include nominations for a Critics' Choice Television Award and four Screen Actors Guild Awards.
