= And Justice for All... =

- Dexter: Resurrection episode
- Dexter Morgan (Michael C. Hall) about to kill Leon Prater (Peter Dinklage) for killing Angel Batista (David Zayas) and threatening Harrison (Jack Alcott), after taking Leon’s files of serial killers to hunt them down.
- Episode no.: Season 1 Episode 10
- Directed by: Marcos Siega
- Story by: Clyde Phillips; Alexandra Franklin; Marc Muszynski
- Teleplay by: Clyde Phillips
- Cinematography by: Joe Collins
- Editing by: Louis Cioffi
- Original air date: September 5, 2025
- Running time: 46 minutes

Guest appearances
- Christie Brinkley as Herself; Christian Camargo as Brian Moser; Darius Jordan Lee as Lance Thomas; JillMarie Lawrence as Constance; Emily Kimball as Gigi; Desmond Harrington as Joey Quinn

Episode chronology
← Previous "Touched by an Ángel"	Next → "Risky Business"

"And Justice for All..." is the tenth episode and first season finale of the American crime drama mystery television series Dexter: Resurrection, sequel to Dexter and Dexter: New Blood. The episode was written by series creator Clyde Phillips from a story by Phillips, supervising producer Alexandra Franklin, and supervising producer Marc Muszynski, and directed by executive producer Marcos Siega. It was released on Paramount+ with Showtime on September 5, 2025, and aired on Showtime two days later. However, a Russian dub version of the episode was leaked one week prior to its airing.

The series is set following the events of Dexter: New Blood, and it follows Dexter Morgan, who has recovered from his near-fatal gunshot wound. After realizing that his son Harrison is now working as a hotel bellhop in New York City, he sets out to find him. During this, his old friend Angel Batista returns to talk with Dexter over unfinished business. In the episode, Dexter tries to escape from Prater's vault, while Prater prepares for his gala. This episode marks the final regular appearance of David Zayas, who had been a regular cast member since the beginning of the franchise as Angel Batista. The episode also features cameos by Desmond Harrington as Joey Quinn and Christian Camargo as Brian Moser, both characters from the original series.

The episode received mostly positive reviews from critics, who praised it as a satisfying closure to the season's storylines.

== Plot ==
While trying to find a way out of the vault, Dexter Morgan imagines a conversation with his deceased older brother Brian Moser, who mocks him for getting emotionally attached. Dexter finds Prater's files on a number of serial killers, including Cooper Morris, the man who killed Prater's parents.

Dexter finds Angel Batista's phone and contacts Harrison, who agrees to attend the gala to find him. Harrison makes his way to the penthouse, only to be held at gunpoint by Charley. Through the phone, Dexter shows Charley that Prater has been monitoring and keeping all her activities in a file, threatening to expose Charley for having Mia murdered. (Note: As depicted in "Cats and Mouse") Charley is disgusted and agrees to let Harrison live, but warns she will not help him escape. Remembering that the gala is held on Prater's parents' death anniversary, Dexter correctly deduces the code to the vault is Morris' inmate number. After Harrison enters the code, Dexter gets him to leave while he retrieves several of the files, including Al's, his blood slides and Red's thumbprint.

Charley tells Prater she quits and warns him to keep paying for her mother's treatment or she will expose all their activities. As Prater gives a speech, he notices Harrison trying to leave. Shutting down the cameras, Prater holds Harrison at gunpoint and contacts Dexter to meet him at the penthouse, intending to kill both of them, and finally feeling the urge to kill shared by the serial killers Prater has always been fascinated by. Remembering the M99 syringe that Dexter gave him for protection, (Note: As depicted in "Touched by an Ángel") Harrison injects Prater, sedating him. Harrison escapes as Dexter ties Prater to the killing table, refusing Prater's offer of money to spare him. Dexter admits that his recent experiences have caused Dexter to realize that he shares the Morgan family sense of justice and it is this along with his Dark Passenger that drives Dexter's actions. Dexter kills Prater, removes all evidence of his presence from the room, and bids a final farewell to Angel.

On his way out, Dexter activates the alarm, prompting the police, including Claudette and Melvin, to race to the penthouse. They find the vault, Angel's body and the murder weapon with Prater's fingerprints on it, concluding Prater murdered him. Claudette and Melvin find some of the files, including all the information on the New York Ripper, giving Claudette the chance to finally catch him. Charley gets her mother out of the house, telling her they are leaving the city. Dexter takes Prater's yacht, and disposes of Prater's body in the New York Harbor, and also takes Prater's serial killers files to have targets. Dexter notes that while he struggles to fit in, he feels he can blend in, thanks to Harrison and everyone close to him helping Dexter to be more human. He accepts that he can never be normal, but he can live with it. Dexter heads out to sea with Prater's files, his new targets to go after.

== Production ==
=== Development ===
In May 2025, the episode's title was revealed to be "And Justice for All...". The episode was written by series creator Clyde Phillips from a story by Phillips, supervising producer Alexandra Franklin, and supervising producer Marc Muszynski, and directed by executive producer Marcos Siega. This marked Phillips' second writing credit, Franklin's second writing credit, Muszynski's second writing credit, and Siega's sixth directing credit.

== Reception ==
"And Justice for All..." received mostly positive reviews from critics. Louis Peitzman of Vulture gave the episode a 3 star rating out of 5 and wrote, "Although the show is returning, it's likely that wasn't always the plan, which would explain why “And Justice for All” has the hallmarks of a (mildly disappointing) series closer. On the whole, it's not a bad episode of Dexter – we’ve certainly seen much worse – but it's all a little too clean to feel as satisfying as the hours of television that precede it."

Clayton Davis of Variety wrote, "Longtime fans of Dexter should be pleased with the Season 1 finale of Resurrection, after missing the mark with the ending of the original series (and with the recent New Blood) – but this season-ender capped off the franchise's return to form. With a finale that featured thumbprints, hallucinations in vaults and more father-son angst than a Shakespearean tragedy, it was solid enough to warrant more Dexter adventures in Manhattan."

Shawn Van Horn of Collider gave the episode an 8 out of 10 rating and wrote, "Dexter once wished he could be normal, but he's exactly who he needs to be – and exactly who you need him to be, too." Mads Misasi of Telltale TV gave the episode a perfect 5 out of 5 star rating and wrote, "After a very well-rounded, well-received first season, Dexter: Resurrection Season 1 Episode 10, “And Justice For All...,” does a fantastic job of wrapping up loose ends while leaving just enough open for more."

Greg MacArthur of Screen Rant wrote, "Dexter: Resurrection episode 10, "And Justice For All," ends with the classic image of Dexter dumping a body off a boat into a harbor, bringing the remarkable first season of the franchise's third expansion series to a satisfying ending." Carissa Pavlica of TV Fanatic gave the episode a 3.75 star rating out of 5 and wrote, "That evolution is unsettling, but it's also strangely satisfying. Because, as Dexter reminds us, we're not innocent in this."

=== Accolades ===
TVLine named Michael C. Hall the "Performer of the Week" for the week of September 6, 2025, for his performance in the episode. The site wrote, "Dex referred to his experience at Prater's compound as “a f–king revelation.” Eleven seasons in, that's exactly how we'd describe Hall's continued presence as the Bay Harbor Butcher, a performance so elevated, so natural, so thrilling that it always leaves us wanting more."
