= Backseat Driver (Dexter: Resurrection) =

- Dexter: Resurrection episode
- Angel Batista (David Zayas), Vince Masuka (C. S. Lee) and Joey Quinn (Desmond Harrington) discussing Batista's withdrawal from Miami Metro
- Episode no.: Season 1 Episode 3
- Directed by: Monica Raymund
- Written by: Nick Zayas
- Cinematography by: Radium Cheung
- Editing by: Louis Cioffi
- Original air date: July 18, 2025
- Running time: 52 minutes

Guest appearances
- David Magidoff as Teddy Reed; C. S. Lee as Vince Masuka; Desmond Harrington as Joey Quinn; Marc Menchaca as Red; Bryan Lillis as Ryan Foster; JillMarie Lawrence as Constance Kamara; Reese Antoinette as Joy Kamara; Jason Alan Carvell as Stefan Pike; McKaley Miller as Shauna

Episode chronology
← Previous "Camera Shy"	Next → "Call Me Red"

"Backseat Driver" is the third episode of the American crime drama mystery television series Dexter: Resurrection, sequel to Dexter and Dexter: New Blood. The episode was written by supervising producer Nick Zayas, and directed by producer Monica Raymund. It was released on Paramount+ with Showtime on July 18, 2025, and aired on Showtime two days later.

The series is set following the events of Dexter: New Blood, and it follows Dexter Morgan, who has recovered from his near-fatal gunshot wound. After realizing that his son Harrison is now working as a hotel bellhop in New York City, he sets out to find him. During this, his old friend Angel Batista returns to talk with Dexter over unfinished business. In the episode, Dexter continues stalking Ronald Schmidt, while Harrison is questioned by Claudette and Melvin.

The episode received mostly positive reviews from critics, who praised the performances, tension, and character development.

== Plot ==
Dexter begins working as a UrCar driver, but his unpreparedness does not sit well with his customers. He gets a 4.2 average, and Blessing warns that if he continues losing points, his account will be deactivated. While dining with his family, Dexter learns that Blessing's wife Constance ran a background check on him using a paid website. He uses that website to identify Ronald Schmidt's apartment, which he inspects. He discovers his collection of trophies from his victims, concluding he must be killed.

Claudette questions Harrison about Ryan's murder, as security cameras show him accompanying him and Shauna to his room. He explains he left with a woman, but Claudette remains suspicious. She deduces the way the killer disposed of Ryan's body. Claudette and Melvin meet again with Harrison, with Claudette explaining that his alibi does not work because he did not leave the hotel that night. When she explains in detail how Harrison carried out the plan, they offer legal defence for Harrison. Instead, he claims that he lied because he is homeless and lives in vacant hotel rooms, providing his friend Elsa as an alibi.

Having returned to Miami, Angel Batista meets with Vince Masuka and Joey Quinn, announcing that he plans to retire from Miami Metro. He has just found out from Teddy Reed that Dexter is in New York City, but does not disclose this, telling them he has something to take care of. Dexter undergoes acupuncture with Blessing's daughter Joy which restores Dexter's strength, while also using his old Doctor Patrick Bateman alias (Note: As seen in "Return to Sender.") to obtain the M99 needed to sedate Ronald. During his shift, Ronald boards his car. However, Dexter's syringe slips before Ronald starts garroting him. As he questions Dexter, Dexter manages to sedate him. Taking him to Ronald's apartment to kill him, Ronald believes he was responsible for an invitation, but Dexter has no idea what it means. After Ronald explains how rideshare drivers were responsible for his father's suicide, Dexter kills him.

Checking Ronald's belongings, Dexter finds the invitation from Charley, which includes a case of money as an offering. He takes the remains to a neighborhood avoided by the police, and burns them in a furnace. Despite claiming he must be alone, he takes an interest in a party filled with other serial killers. Upon discovering that he requires a thumbprint for entry, he retrieves Ronald's dismembered arm and chops off his finger.

== Production ==
=== Development ===
In May 2025, the episode's title was revealed to be "Backseat Driver". The episode was written by supervising producer Nick Zayas, and directed by producer Monica Raymund. This marked Zayas' first writing credit, and Raymund's first directing credit.

=== Writing ===
David Zayas explained Angel Batista's decision to leave Miami Metro to focus on New York City, "the one thing that I really love about this is that Batista is not trying to drag anyone else into this. This is his responsibility to try and find out, or try to get justice from what he's learned, and there is a protection about that. They know what the task at hand is, and they don't want to drag anyone else with them. And that's true, I feel, for both characters." Jack Alcott said that Harrison has "been through so much at this point" and "does not feel great about what happened" being "conflicted", and that's why he's looking to start a new life in New York. For Alcott there are so many more possibilities now for "good things to happen, bad things to happen, friends, enemies" to the character.

=== Music ===
The episode features the songs "Left Hand Free" of Alt-J, "I’m a Killing Bee" of The Stone Foxes, "Stayin' Alive" of the Bee Gees, "Desconocido" of Tom Z, "Amor En La Island" of Leif Shires, "Escape A Las Bahamas" of Leif Shires, and "This is the Beginning" of Marqus Clae.

== Reception ==
"Backseat Driver" received mostly positive reviews from critics. Louis Peitzman of Vulture gave the episode a 3 star rating out of 5 and wrote, "So far, Resurrection is solid — and for Dexter, that's not a given! — but the Harrison murder investigation storyline can't compete with his dad's more dynamic return. I'm ready for the two Morgans' paths to cross again so that we can move things along."

Shawn Van Horn of Collider gave the episode a 7 out of 10 rating and wrote, "Dexter thinks his is a path that can only be walked alone, but still, there might be room to meet people just like him." Matthew Wilkinson of Game Rant wrote, "It's another gripping storyline that is running through this series, which features three key plots that all link back to Dexter in some way, ensuring each episode of Dexter: Resurrection moves between them and remains fast-paced." Mads Misasi of Telltale TV gave the episode a 4 out of 5 star rating and wrote, "I could already argue that having even these brief glimpses of Angel's movements causes the flow of the episode to stall a bit. Who knows maybe his connection to the story will strengthen in the next episode once he's in NYC, but I'm not holding my breath."

Greg MacArthur of Screen Rant wrote, "Dexter: Resurrection episode 3 effectively moves the various subplots along in riveting and surprising ways. Each new installment of Resurrection so far continues to justify the franchise's modern revival with not just good, but outstanding quality and effort." Carissa Pavlica of TV Fanatic gave the episode a 4.25 star rating out of 5 and wrote, "Three episodes in, and Dexter: Resurrection is having a blast. It’s ridiculous, stylish, and fully aware of what it is. That's what makes it fun."
