= Course Correction (Dexter: Resurrection) =

- Dexter: Resurrection episode
- Dexter Morgan (Michael C. Hall) taking Angel Batista (David Zayas) in his car, with this trip causing them to reach the most critical point in their relationship.
- Episode no.: Season 1 Episode 7
- Directed by: Monica Raymund
- Story by: Hilly Hicks Jr.; Edith D. Rodríguez
- Teleplay by: Hilly Hicks Jr.
- Cinematography by: Ramsey Nickell
- Editing by: Louis Cioffi
- Original air date: August 15, 2025
- Running time: 53 minutes

Guest appearances
- Eric Stonestreet as Al (special guest star); David Dastmalchian as Gareth; JillMarie Lawrence as Constance; Reese Antoinette as Joy; Emily Kimball as Gigi

Episode chronology
← Previous "Cats and Mouse"	Next → "The Kill Room Where It Happens"

"Course Correction" is the seventh episode of the American crime drama mystery television series Dexter: Resurrection, sequel to Dexter and Dexter: New Blood. The episode was written by Hilly Hicks Jr. from a story by Hicks Jr. and Edith D. Rodríguez, and directed by producer Monica Raymund. It was released on Paramount+ with Showtime on August 15, 2025, and aired on Showtime two days later.

The series is set following the events of Dexter: New Blood, and it follows Dexter Morgan, who has recovered from his near-fatal gunshot wound. After realizing that his son Harrison is now working as a hotel bellhop in New York City, he sets out to find him. During this, his old friend Angel Batista returns to talk with Dexter over unfinished business. In the episode, Dexter goes with Prater to a private castle, where he targets Gareth as his victim.

The episode received highly positive reviews from critics, who praised the performances, pacing, and ending confrontation.

== Plot ==
Prater takes Dexter Morgan, Al and Gareth to his mansion in the countryside, hoping to build more trust and relaxation. He also informs them that Mia committed suicide, but Dexter wonders if she was actually murdered. As part of the evening, they are all asked to show a presentation. Al presents a video he recorded of him murdering a jogger, secretly disgusting Dexter.

When Dexter is asked to show a presentation as "Red", Dexter uses this as an opportunity to explain how he lives with a "mask" on in order to deal with his Dark Passenger. Inspired by Dexter, Prater confides to him his difficult past and his friendship with the serial killer who murdered his parents. He then presents him his most prized trophy: the first letter that the killer wrote him. Dexter privately reveals to Gareth that he knows he has a twin, but expresses his admiration. He opens up about his past with his brother Brian Moser, before revealing he killed Gareth's twin. Enraged, a devastated Gareth attacks him while everyone watches in the distance. Dexter kills Gareth in self-defense before claiming Gareth had told him he planned to kill Lowell, him and Al. Prater believes the story, but Charley has her suspicions.

Returning to New York at night, Dexter accompanies Harrison to a tour in Collings College of Criminology, where Harrison has taken an interest in applying. To their surprise, Claudette is a featured guest, giving a presentation on the unknown serial killer, the New York Ripper. She also claims killers do not feel love nor other feelings. Having seen the Ripper's murder weapon in Prater's collection, Dexter gives her some advice on the case. Dexter tells Harrison that while he does not experience emotions in the same way other people do, his love for him is real, comforting him and supporting his decision.

Dexter returns home, but is shocked to find Angel Batista hanging out with Blessing's family. Dexter offers to give Angel a ride so the two can talk privately. In the car, Dexter drops the facade, warning Angel to stay away from him and Harrison. Angel objects, wanting to avenge the deaths of James Doakes, Debra Morgan, and María LaGuerta. Dexter warns Angel that things can go badly for him if he is who he thinks he is before angrily forcing him out of the car. Dexter drives off, unaware that Angel has hidden his AirPods in Dexter's car in order to track him.

== Production ==
=== Development ===
In May 2025, the episode's title was revealed to be "Course Correction". The episode was written by executive producer Hilly Hicks Jr. from a story by Hicks Jr. and Edith D. Rodríguez, and directed by producer Monica Raymund. This marked Hicks' first writing credit, Rodríguez's first writing credit, and Raymund's third directing credit.

=== Writing ===
David Dastmalchian was content with how the Gemini Killers were written out, saying "I got to do with the Gareths is something that no one has done. The Dexter legacy is now deep and long, and the fandom is incredible. Not only did I get to play two characters, but I had two performances to craft. I had two confrontations with Dexter, two kills from Dexter, but none of them happened in the Dexter way. I never get strapped to a table. It's all very unique."

=== Filming ===
The scenes at the castle were filmed at Oheka Castle.

=== Music ===
The episode features the songs "Satan Is His Name" of Holly Golightly, "U-Mass" of Pixies, "Kill Your Ego" of Pike Project, "Ran Kan Kan" of Tito Puente, and "Showdown" of Electric Light Orchestra.

== Reception ==
"Course Correction" received highly positive reviews from critics. Louis Peitzman of Vulture gave the episode a 4 star rating out of 5 and wrote, "I'm having such a good time, in fact, that I'm actually feeling a little bummed at how quickly Dexter is offing his fellow dinner-party guests. What’s the rush? But while I would love to spend more time with Prater and his serial killer pals, I can acknowledge that the show's breakneck pacing is one of the biggest points in its favor, particularly given the wheel-spinning of the first few episodes."

Shawn Van Horn of Collider gave the episode an 8 out of 10 rating and wrote, "As Dexter flies away in Prater's helicopter to a surprise destination, we wonder how long he can keep this up before he is finally caught and exposed for who he really is. In Episode 7, "Course Correction," the vice grip around Dexter's world only gets tighter." Mads Misasi of Telltale TV gave the episode a 4 out of 5 star rating and wrote, "Dexter's always had a slightly awkward, yet charming, persona but during Dexter: Resurrection Season 1 Episode 7, “Course Correction,” it feels a bit manic. Like I said, maybe that is the writer's intention for these final few episodes."

Greg MacArthur of Screen Rant wrote, "These scenes between Dexter and Prater, and later Dexter and Gareth's twin, are some of the best of the second Dexter sequel series. Not only are they thrilling and move the current plot along tastefully, but they also cleverly employ Dexter's past to make a magnificent, complex, and rewarding viewing experience." Carissa Pavlica of TV Fanatic gave the episode a 4.5 star rating out of 5 and wrote, "On “Course Correction,” everything gets sharper. It's funnier and more dangerous. It's not just a turning point — it's a bloodstained mirror held up to the past, forcing Dexter to confront what he is... and what he might still become."
