= The Kill Room Where It Happens =

- Dexter: Resurrection episode
- Leon Prater (Peter Dinklage) corners Dexter Morgan (Michael C. Hall) after seeing him having dinner with his son Harrison (Jack Alcott), whose existence he was unaware of.
- Episode no.: Season 1 Episode 8
- Directed by: Monica Raymund
- Story by: Tony Saltzman; Dane Anderson
- Teleplay by: Tony Saltzman
- Cinematography by: Ramsey Nickell
- Editing by: Gaston Jaren Lopez
- Original air date: August 22, 2025
- Running time: 45 minutes

Guest appearances
- Eric Stonestreet as Al (special guest star); Desmond Harrington as Joey Quinn; Steve Schirripa as Vinny Valente; JillMarie Lawrence as Constance; Reese Antoinette as Joy; Emily Kimball as Gigi; Patrick Dempsey as Captain Aaron Spencer (photograph)

Episode chronology
← Previous "Course Correction"	Next → "Touched by an Ángel"

"The Kill Room Where It Happens" is the eighth episode of the American crime drama mystery television series Dexter: Resurrection, sequel to Dexter and Dexter: New Blood. The episode was written by Tony Saltzman from a story by Saltzman and Dane Anderson, and directed by producer Monica Raymund. It was released on Paramount+ with Showtime on August 22, 2025, and aired on Showtime two days later.

The series is set following the events of Dexter: New Blood, and it follows Dexter Morgan, who has recovered from his near-fatal gunshot wound. After realizing that his son Harrison is now working as a hotel bellhop in New York City, he sets out to find him. During this, his old friend Angel Batista returns to talk with Dexter over unfinished business. In the episode, Dexter sets his sights in killing Al, unaware that Angel has been tracking him.

When Detective Claudette Wallace investigates the Bay Harbor Butcher, events in both Dexter and Dexter: Original Sin are referenced.

The episode received highly positive reviews from critics, who praised the performances, tension and cliffhanger ending. The episode is named after the song "The Room Where It Happens" from the 2015 stage musical Hamilton, which a character in the episode plans on attending.

== Plot ==
After placing the AirPods on Dexter's car, Angel begins tracking him, having researched a pattern in his daily routine. During this, Dexter sets out to kill Al, arranging to meet him that night after the latter watches Hamilton. Dexter cannot delay the event, as Al will return home to Wisconsin shortly thereafter. In the meantime, Detective Claudette Wallace investigates the Bay Harbor Butcher case, finding information on it, the murder of Maria LaGuerta, (Note: As depicted in "Surprise, Motherfucker!") and the disappearance of Captain Aaron Spencer. (Note: As depicted in "Code Blues")

Dexter sets up his kill room in a vacant department store, where he experiences some shoulder pain. During another acupuncture session with Joy, Dexter accidentally reveals Blessing's past as a child soldier, shocking her as she never knew about it. Blessing is upset with Dexter's betrayal, as he feels his daughter now views him as a monster. While preparing for a gala for the NYPD, Prater dismisses Charley's suspicions about "Red", declaring that he trusts him. Harrison meets with Dexter to discuss his problem with Elsa's landlord, Vinny, who refuses to fix the mold in Dante's room. Dexter visits Vinny's office to make him resonate, but Vinny ignores and insults him instead. Harrison takes Gigi on a date at a nightclub, and they end up having sex.

As Dexter waits for Al, he does not find him outside the theater as scheduled. He calls him, and Al tells him he left early for Wisconsin, ruining his chance to kill him. Investigating Vinny's background, he discovers that his irresponsibility has led to multiple deaths and incidents, so he decides to target him instead. He sedates him and takes him to the department store where Dexter threatens Vinny into doing right by his tenants before releasing him as Vinny does not fit the Code. Angel arrives as Dexter releases Vinny, who pushes Angel out of the way. Angel finds the plastic-covered room, but Dexter has already fled the scene. After driving away, Dexter finally discovers the AirPods and destroys them, vowing to end Angel's investigation into him.

Angel brings Claudette and Melvin to the plastic-covered room, hoping to convince them Dexter is the Butcher. However, they are confused over Angel failing to identify Dexter in the scene, and the fact that he was spying on him. Back at her office, Claudette begins to investigate Angel's past, and contacts Lieutenant Joey Quinn to question him. Quinn reveals that Angel just quit his position as Captain, making Claudette realize he is operating outside the law. Dexter and Harrison have dinner, with Harrison revealing that Vinny has finally fixed the mold in Dante's room. Dexter is shocked when Prater approaches him, meeting "Red"'s son.

== Production ==
=== Development ===
In May 2025, the episode's title was revealed to be "The Kill Room Where It Happens". The episode was written by co-executive producer Tony Saltzman from a story by Saltzman and Dane Anderson, and directed by producer Monica Raymund. This marked Saltzman's first writing credit, Anderson's first writing credit, and Raymund's fourth directing credit.

== Reception ==
"The Kill Room Where It Happens" received highly positive reviews from critics. Louis Peitzman of Vulture gave the episode a 4 star rating out of 5 and wrote, "It's almost hard to express just how careless Dexter has been. I don't even mean the Vinny situation, though I still think that was misguided. I'm talking about pretending to be Red while also living a public life and working in New York under his real name, as if a billionaire and his terrifying right-hand woman wouldn't be able to put the pieces together easily."

Shawn Van Horn of Collider gave the episode an 8 out of 10 rating and wrote, "In Episode 8, "The Kill Room Where It Happens," Batista is on the hunt, but a twist ending reveals that it's someone else Dexter needs to worry about most." Mads Misasi of Telltale TV gave the episode a 3.8 out of 5 star rating and wrote, "Dexter: Resurrection Season 1 Episode 8, “The Kill Room Where It Happens,” wastes no time reminding us that Dexter Morgan isn't that easy to catch in the act. In fact, this particular episode does a great job of reminding us that he knows when to call off a kill in order to stay one step ahead."

Greg MacArthur of Screen Rant wrote, "there's still plenty of intrigue left in Dexter: Resurrection season 1 now that Prater knows about Harrison and may connect the dots about Dexter's true identity. His reaction will determine everything in the final two episodes of the season, as will Wallace's response to discovering Angel is retired from the force." Carissa Pavlica of TV Fanatic gave the episode a 4.75 star rating out of 5 and wrote, "Bottom line: this episode was a pressure cooker. The squeeze is on, and the show is playing a dangerous game with our nerves."

=== Accolades ===
TVLine named David Zayas as an honorable mentions for the "Performer of the Week" for the week of August 23, 2025, for his performance in the episode. The site wrote, "In Friday's Dexter: Resurrection, Angel Batista came closer than ever to catching Dexter red-handed, giving the character's portrayer David Zayas some excellent material to work with. After Batista tracked Dexter's location thanks to a pair of cleverly planted Airpods, we could feel the suspense rising thanks to the actor's determination and calculated performance. When the former Miami Metro captain finally found a plastic-wrapped kill room, the look on Zayas' face spoke volumes, prepping us for a potentially brutal showdown between the two former friends. Dexter ultimately escaped, but when Wallace and Oliva arrived on the scene with a gazillion questions, Zayas went to work placing Batista's tenacity front and center as he attempted to counter the detectives' incredulity. Regardless of what goes down in the season’s final two episodes, Zayas' strong camera presence and dynamite swagger has made this Resurrection one worth living for."
