= Murder Horny =

- Dexter: Resurrection episode
- Dexter Morgan (Michael C. Hall) having dinner with Mia LaPierre (Krysten Ritter), where he discovers that she does not have a code to kill people.
- Episode no.: Season 1 Episode 5
- Directed by: Marcos Siega
- Written by: Katrina Mathewson; Tanner Bean
- Cinematography by: Joe Collins
- Editing by: Perri Frank; Sean Cusack
- Original air date: August 1, 2025
- Running time: 49 minutes

Guest appearances
- Krysten Ritter as Mia LaPierre (special guest star); Lesley Stahl as Herself; Will Rogers as Marc

Episode chronology
← Previous "Call Me Red"	Next → "Cats and Mouse"

"Murder Horny" is the fifth episode of the American crime drama mystery television series Dexter: Resurrection, sequel to Dexter and Dexter: New Blood. The episode was written by co-executive producers Katrina Mathewson and Tanner Bean, and directed by executive producer Marcos Siega. It was released on Paramount+ with Showtime on August 1, 2025, and aired on Showtime two days later.

The series is set following the events of Dexter: New Blood, and it follows Dexter Morgan, who has recovered from his near-fatal gunshot wound. After realizing that his son Harrison is now working as a hotel bellhop in New York City, he sets out to find him. During this, his old friend Angel Batista returns to talk with Dexter over unfinished business. In the episode, Dexter tries to reconnect with Harrison, while also getting closer to Mia.

The episode received critical acclaim, with critics praising the scenes between Dexter and Harrison, and Dexter's arc with Mia.

== Plot ==
Dexter Morgan stops Harrison from entering the NYPD headquarters, shocking him. Dexter takes Harrison to his apartment, comforting him over Ryan's death. However, Harrison is still shaken by Dexter's appearance, informing him that Angel Batista is pursuing him. Harrison refuses Dexter's attempts to reconnect, and leaves the apartment, later scheduling an appointment with Claudette that afternoon. While he admits guilt over Shauna's condition, he storms out after finding that he is still considered a suspect.

Hoping to find some comfort, Dexter invites Mia to go bowling with him. Afterwards, Mia surprises Dexter by suggesting they should work together on a new killing. Harry warns Dexter against disclosing his real identity to Mia, as Dexter believes she has a code like his. He agrees to work together on a kill, but is surprised when Mia suggests any driver can work, even if he is not a sexual predator. Mia reveals that while she started out only killing sexual predators, she does not enjoy the "Lady Vengeance" label and targets anyone when the need to kill strikes her.

Dexter is unable to proceed with the killing, causing a frustrated Mia to leave. She goes to a bar where she seduces a man, getting him drunk and taking him to her apartment. Unbeknownst to her, Dexter is watching the event from afar, and calls the police when she knocks the man out. Before Mia can torture the man, the NYPD arrives at the scene and arrests her. The police find Ryan's watch, which Dexter planted in order to frame her for Ryan's murder, and therefore sway suspicion away from Harrison. Prater learns of the arrest and assigns Charley to handle the situation. Batista, who is investigating Dexter, is also shocked by the news report.

After seeing the report, Harrison visits Dexter, who confirms that he planted the watch and got Mia arrested. Dexter explains that he struggled with keeping his normal life with Rita Bennett and Harrison, and how he failed to protect Rita from Arthur Mitchell while pursuing him. (Note: As depicted in "The Getaway".) Dexter says that he sees goodness and humanity in Harrison and that is why he needs him. He promises not to try to mold Harrison into a killer like himself and that he doesn't want him to be, reconciling their relationship. In prison, Charley visits Mia, telling her Prater will ensure her stay is comfortable and short.

== Production ==
=== Development ===
In May 2025, the episode's title was revealed to be "Murder Horny". The episode was written by co-executive producers Katrina Mathewson and Tanner Bean, and directed by executive producer Marcos Siega. This marked Mathewson's first writing credit, Bean's first writing credit, and Siega's third directing credit.

The episode's title was originally "Push Me, Pull Me", but was changed to "Murder Horny" at the suggestion of Scott Reynolds during filming. The name comes from a phrase that Krysten Ritter's Mia says.

=== Writing ===
Following the episode, Ritter's character was compared to Jaime Murray's Lila West, from the second season of Dexter, being both "homicidal women whom Dexter forms an immediate romantic bond with."

=== Music ===
The episode features the songs "High Speed Charger" of Orange 9mm, "Beggin" of Måneskin, "Heads Will Roll" of Yeah Yeah Yeahs, "All That We Perceive" of Thievery Corporation, "Pussy Liquor" of Rob Zombie, "Desire" of Meg Myers, and "Eat an Eraser" of Princess Goes. The song "Eat an Eraser" that appears in the end credits, is a remix done by Michael C. Hall's band.

== Reception ==
"Murder Horny" received critical acclaim. Louis Peitzman of Vulture gave the episode a 4 star rating out of 5 and wrote, "As worried as I was about a slide back to mediocrity after last week's exceptional installment, Resurrection has managed to keep the momentum going. Even if “Murder Horny” (what a title) doesn't quite hit the highs of the serial-killer dinner party, it still gives us plenty to celebrate."

Shawn Van Horn of Collider gave the episode an 8 out of 10 rating and wrote, "Charley is able to finally meet with Mia by posing as a lawyer, where she tells Lady Vengeance that her time in jail will be as short as possible. Is she going to kill Mia or help get her out?" Matthew Wilkinson of Game Rant wrote, "It was another intense episode of the show, which continues to go from strength to strength. There is a clear, slow-burning storyline unfolding here, but seeing some of Dexter’s key relationships fleshed out in more detail has helped to positively advance the overall plot of Dexter: Resurrection." Mads Misasi of Telltale TV gave the episode a 4.5 out of 5 star rating and wrote, "The greatest thing about this show so far is that we still aren't entirely sure what the end result is going to be. However, after seeing this episode one thing is abundantly clear. Dexter: Resurrection is developing like a fine wine. Give it time to build and the pay off will be worth it."

Greg MacArthur of Screen Rant wrote, "Even though Resurrection episode 5 didn't quite match the highs of last week's 10/10 episode, it was still a solid entry in the series that held the positive momentum strong. While some 10-episode shows have fallen short and grown thin in their mid-season episodes, Dexter: Resurrection is still pulling strong and keeping fans excited about what's to come next." Carissa Pavlica of TV Fanatic gave the episode a 4.25 star rating out of 5 and wrote, "Dexter: Resurrection Season 1 Episode 5 is, predictably, unhinged. But underneath the provocative title (“Murder Horny”) and Dexter's almost-romantic near-kill with Mia lies one of the most emotional, introspective episodes of the season."

=== Accolades ===
TVLine named Jack Alcott as the "Performer of the Week" for the week of August 2, 2025, for his performance in the episode. The site wrote, "Harrison may not be like his pops, but having such a solid young talent like Alcott on board, one who can hold his own alongside a powerhouse like Michael C. Hall, has made this Resurrection something to wake the dead for."
