= Risky Business (Dexter: Resurrection) =

- Dexter: Resurrection episode
- Episode no.: Season 2 Episode 1
- Directed by: Marcos Siega
- Written by: Clyde Phillips; Scott Reynolds
- Cinematography by: Joe Collins
- Editing by: Perri Frank
- Original air date: October 30, 2026
- Running time: 50 minutes

Guest appearances
- David Zayas as Angel Batista (special guest star); Eric Stonestreet as Al Walker (special guest star); Kane Hodder as New York Ripper; Chris Jericho as Midnight Mangler; Shavo Odadjian as Yonkers Slayer; Philip Casnoff as Framt's Lawyer; Ilan Eskenazi as Lon Smith

Episode chronology
← Previous "And Justice for All..."	Next → "Fallen"

"Risky Business" is the first episode of the second season of the American crime drama mystery television series Dexter: Resurrection, sequel to Dexter and Dexter: New Blood. The episode was written by series creator Clyde Phillips and executive producer Scott Reynolds, and directed by executive producer Marcos Siega. It was released on Paramount+ with Showtime on October 30, 2026, and aired on Showtime two days later.

The series is set following the events of Dexter: New Blood, and it follows Dexter Morgan, who has recovered from his near-fatal gunshot wound. After reuniting with his son Harrison in New York City, he tries to balance his life as a father and his life as a serial killer, as his past comes back to haunt him. In the episode, Dexter sets his sights in tracking Al down, as Harrison graduates from police academy.

The episode received highly positive reviews from critics, who praised the performances, closure to Al's storyline, and new cast additions.

== Plot ==
Three years after Prater's death, the five living serial killers in his files have gone hiding. Dexter retrieved the files to track and kill two killers: the Midnight Mangler and the Yonkers Slayer. Nevertheless, he still feels haunted by Angel's death, despite Harry claiming it is not his fault.

Wallace and Oliva question the wheelchair-ridden Don Framt, the man identified in Prater's file as the New York Ripper. However, the files do not provide enough evidence and they lack leads in his testimony. They are forced to release him, and Don's lawyer threatens action if they continue harassing him. The precinct also has to deal with a serial killer identified as the Five Borough Killer, who threatens to kill a New Yorker during a baseball game the next day. As Wallace tries to build evidence, she is informed that Harrison, who is about to graduate from police academy, might be a candidate to join the Homicide Division.

After seeing a report that Al committed a murder in Worlds End State Park, Dexter decides to track him, reaching Pennsylvania even though he could miss Harrison's ceremony. He tracks Al, and convinces him to join him to catch up that night. At an abandoned body shop that he set up as a kill room, Dexter is confronted by Al for taking his "trophies" and they engage in a brutal fight, with Dexter unable to inject him with M99. Eventually, Dexter manages to hang Al with a hoist chain. He dismantles the kill room, deciding to leave Al's corpse and trophies to be found by the police. While his father is away, Harrison has a one-night stand with a fellow cop.

The Five Borough Killer kills a woman at a parking lot outside a stadium, with the rain washing away all evidence. He later AirDrops the footage of the killing to a random woman in Washington Square Park, panicking nearby civilians. At the precinct, Joey Quinn arrives and asks Wallace and Oliva about Angel. Back home, Dexter tells Harry that he feels like he wants more recognition for his deeds, which Harry deduces might be due to a midlife crisis.

== Production ==
=== Development ===
The episode was written by series creator Clyde Phillips and executive producer Scott Reynolds, and directed by executive producer Marcos Siega. This marked Phillips' third writing credit, Reynolds' third writing credit, and Siega's seventh directing credit.

=== Writing ===
Regarding Dexter's mid-life crisis in the episode, Michael C. Hall explained, "The symptom of his midlife crisis is a desire for recognition, a desire for appreciation, a desire to be celebrated for being a uniquely capable person. That's a dicey proposition for someone whose primary role is not to get caught, given what he does. It creates an inherent conflict and invites him into taking dangerous risks that he wouldn't otherwise take, which is always a part of the fun." Jack Alcott also said that Dexter's relationship with Harrison would be further explored as the latter becomes a police officer, "For now, there is a mutual understanding that we want to help innocent people and protect them and deliver justice, in whatever way we choose, to those who hurt innocent people."

=== Casting ===
The episode also introduces Brian Cox as the New York Ripper, with Cox announced to join the series in April 2026. Cox commented on his addition, "That's all I came to do, was give in to it. He's such a despicable, horrible human being. In fact, I'm not even sure if he's a human being. He's a sort of creature, and I just had to give in to that. And I thought there was no question of understanding my motivation or understanding any of that normal stuff, which tends to help actors but sometimes plagues them at the same time. So I just let it go, and I still don't know where he came from. I'm still as baffled as ever, because it kind of was scary. It's scary that this creature, I could tap into him in the way I did, and I felt that maybe I should have therapy once I'm done with the show."

== Reception ==
"Risky Business" received highly positive reviews from critics. Matt Fowler of IGN gave the episode a "good" 7 out of 10 rating and wrote in his verdict, "Regardless as to what ultimately pans out for the season, "Risky Business" is a fun, twisty start for Season 2 (which is actually Season 11, in a way). It either sets up a bunch of dominos for Dexter to knock down or unleashes an avalanche of calamity that our hero won't be able to survive. Two (so far) ruthless killers out in the city, Harrison taking his oath as a police officer, a blast from the past snooping around, and Dexter feeling froggy could all add up to some macabre, tragic moments."

Louis Peitzman of Vulture gave the episode a 4 star rating out of 5 and wrote, "Last year, the franchise hit heights not seen since the Trinity Killer stalked Miami in 2006, and while that makes for a tough act to follow, we're off to a promising start with the season premiere. Dexter himself might feel aimless and underappreciated, but Dexter is in a creative renaissance, and long-suffering fans can remain grateful."

Erik Kain of Forbes wrote, "Things are looking dicey as ever, with an array of new killers, potential threats and a son in the NYPD. Not to mention a Dark Passenger hellbent on letting the light in.k Dexter always finds a way out of the many tight spots he gets himself into, but the same cannot be said for those in his orbit."

Matthew Fox of Show Snob wrote, "I like this model of Dexter moving forward. I also like that we're tackling what's going on with Dexter as he gets older. I like that he's still talking with Harry but dealing with some changing circumstances. Stevens makes for a fun addition as the Five Borough Killer, while Cox is chewing it up as Framt. We've set the stage for a fun second season." Carissa Pavlica of TV Fanatic gave the episode a 4.25 star rating out of 5 and wrote, "It's one more thing in a long line of them to keep Dexter on his toes, and that's the formula for great TV. And with four more boroughs and the New York Ripper still maniacally laughing, Dex has work to do."
