= Dexter: Resurrection =

2025 American television series

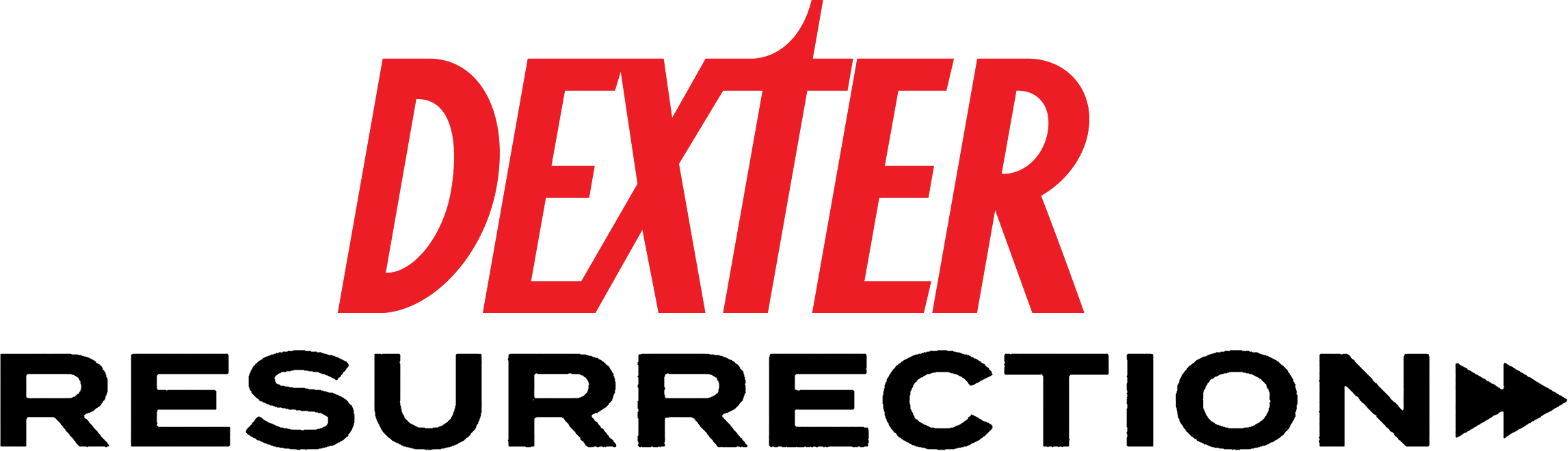
- Genre: Crime drama; Mystery
- Based on: Dexter by James Manos Jr.; Dexter by Jeff Lindsay
- Developed by: Clyde Phillips
- Showrunner: Clyde Phillips
- Starring: Michael C. Hall; Uma Thurman; Jack Alcott; David Zayas; Ntare Guma Mbaho Mwine; Kadia Saraf; Dominic Fumusa; Emilia Suárez; James Remar; Peter Dinklage; Dan Stevens; Bokeem Woodbine; Desmond Harrington; Nona Parker Johnson; Brian Cox
- Music by: Pat Irwin
- Country of origin: United States
- Original language: English
- No. of seasons: 2
- No. of episodes: 14

Production
- Executive producers: Clyde Phillips; Scott Reynolds; Marcos Siega; Hilly Hicks Jr.; John Goldwyn; Sara Colleton; Tony Hernandez; Lilly Burns; Michael C. Hall; Kirsa Rein; Katrina Mathewson; Tanner Bean; Veronica West
- Cinematography: Joe Collins; Radium Cheung; Ramsey Nickell; Anthony Hardwick
- Editors: Perri Frank; Katie Ennis; Louis Cioffi; Gaston Jaren Lopez; Sean Cusack; Erica Freed
- Running time: 45–66 minutes
- Production companies: Clyde Phillips Productions; Sal Centric; Counterpart Studios; Paramount Television Studios (Note: Known as Showtime Studios in the first season.)

Original release
- Network: Paramount+ Premium
- Release: July 11, 2025 – present

Related
- Dexter; Dexter: New Blood; Dexter: Original Sin

Dexter: Resurrection is an American crime drama mystery television series developed by Clyde Phillips. It is a sequel series to Dexter and Dexter: New Blood, and it features Michael C. Hall reprising his role as Dexter Morgan alongside Uma Thurman, Jack Alcott, David Zayas, Ntare Guma Mbaho Mwine, Kadia Saraf, Dominic Fumusa, Emilia Suárez, James Remar, and Peter Dinklage.

Dexter: Resurrection premiered on July 11, 2025, on Paramount+ Premium, and comprises ten episodes. In October 2025, the series was renewed for a second season which premiered on October 30, 2026, and will consist of ten episodes.

== Premise ==
Ten weeks after the events of Dexter: New Blood, Dexter Morgan, who has recovered from his near-fatal gunshot wound, traces a missing Harrison to New York City. But when Captain Angel Batista tracks him from Miami, Dexter realizes that his past is catching up with him faster than he realized.

In the second season, Dexter is torn between two killers, one well-known and another spreading a new kind of fear across New York, while struggling with a midlife crisis. At the same time, Harrison follows his own sense of justice as both face the darkest chapter in their lives.

== Cast and characters ==
=== Main ===
- Michael C. Hall as Dexter Morgan, a serial killer who kills criminals who slip through the justice system
- Uma Thurman as Charley Brown, Prater's right-hand head of security who later collaborates with Dexter to hunt down the killers from the Prater's club
- Jack Alcott as Harrison Morgan, Dexter's son, who works as a bellhop at the Empire Hotel in the first season and later becomes a police officer
- David Zayas as Angel Batista (season 1; special guest season 2), the former captain of the Miami Metro Homicide unit and an old colleague of Dexter's
- Ntare Guma Mbaho Mwine as Blessing Kamara, a rideshare driver whom Dexter befriends and who becomes his landlord
- Kadia Saraf as Claudette Wallace, a New York City Police Department (NYPD) detective investigating the murder at the Empire Hotel
- Dominic Fumusa as Melvin Oliva, a detective and Wallace's NYPD partner
- Emilia Suárez as Elsa Rivera (season 1), a cleaner at the Empire Hotel and Harrison's friend
- James Remar as Harry Morgan, Dexter's deceased adoptive father who manifests as his internal conscience during times of conflict
- Peter Dinklage as Leon Prater (season 1), a billionaire venture capitalist who runs a secret society of serial killers
- Dan Stevens as Lucas Stark / the Five Borough Killer (season 2), a serial killer who threatens the police with phone calls about murdering innocent people
- Bokeem Woodbine as Captain Mixon (season 2), the NYPD Homicide department captain and Fiona's father
- Desmond Harrington as Joey Quinn (season 2; guest star season 1), former lieutenant of the Miami Metro Homicide Department who became a private investigator.
- Nona Parker Johnson as Fiona Mixon (season 2), a training officer in the NYPD Homicide department and Harrison's new love interest
- Brian Cox as Don Framt / the New York Ripper (season 2), an inactive serial killer who now taunts his victims

=== Recurring ===
- David Magidoff as Teddy Reed (season 1), Iron Lake's acting sheriff
- Jason Alan Carvell as Stefan Pike (season 1), the Empire Hotel's manager and Harrison's boss
- Darius Jordan Lee as Lance Thomas (season 1), Harrison's co-worker at the Empire Hotel and friend
- JillMarie Lawrence as Constance Kamara, Blessing's wife
- Reese Antoinette as Joy Kamara, Blessing and Constance's daughter
- Eric Stonestreet as Al Walker / Rapunzel (season 1; guest season 2), a member of Prater's secret club with a penchant for ponytails
- Krysten Ritter as Mia LaPierre / Lady Vengeance, a member of Prater's secret club, who becomes friends with Dexter
- Emily Kimball as Gigi (season 1), a student tour guide and Harrison's new girlfriend in the first season
- David Dastmalchian as Gareth Pike / Gareth's twin brother (season 1), collectively the Gemini Killers, members of Prater's secret club

=== Notable guest stars ===
- John Lithgow as Arthur Mitchell / Trinity Killer (season 1), a serial killer who killed Dexter's wife Rita
- Erik King as James Doakes (season 1), a Miami detective sergeant who was suspicious of Dexter
- Jimmy Smits as Miguel Prado (season 1), former Miami district attorney who became Dexter's protégé
- Max von Essen as Keith Bauer / the Canton Clubber (season 1), a former member of Prater's secret club
- Marc Menchaca as Red Schmidt / the Dark Passenger (season 1), a serial killer whom Dexter impersonates in order to infiltrate Prater's secret club
- C. S. Lee as Vince Masuka (season 1), a forensic analyst for the Miami Metro Homicide Department
- Neil Patrick Harris as Lowell Sloane / the Tattoo Collector (season 1), a member of Prater's secret club with an obsession for tattooed human skin
- Steve Schirripa as Vinny Valente (season 1), Elsa's landlord
- Lesley Stahl as herself (season 1), a television journalist who interviews Prater
- Christian Camargo as Brian Moser / Ice Truck Killer (season 1), Dexter's deceased brother who appears to him as a vision
- Chris Jericho as the Midnight Mangler (season 2), a serial killer from Prater's club who broke his victims' bones before killing them
- Gabriel Luna as Ray Ballard / the Sleepy-Eyed Stranger (season 2), a serial killer who torments his victims in their homes before killing them
- Jack Dylan Grazer as John Thomas Jr. / JawSplitter (season 2), son of John Thomas, the original JawSplitter, and heir to his activities and name

== Episodes ==
Season	Episodes	Originally released	
Season	Episodes	First released	Last released
1	10	July 11, 2025	September 5, 2025
2	10	October 30, 2026	January 1, 2027

=== Season 1 (2025) ===
No. overall	No. in season	Title	Directed by	Written by	Original release date
1	1	"A Beating Heart..."	Marcos Siega	Clyde Phillips & Scott Reynolds	July 11, 2025
Now living in New York City and working as a bellhop at the Empire Hotel, Harrison Morgan gives in to his dark urges and kills Ryan Foster, a sexual predator attempting to rape a drugged hotel guest. Meanwhile, Dexter Morgan survives being shot and wakes from a ten-week coma, during which he sees visions of people from his past urging him to keep living. Teddy Reed and Angel Batista visit Dexter in the hospital and reveal that Angela Bishop, after discovering Logan shot Dexter, recanted her allegation that he was the Bay Harbor Butcher. Reed also reveals that Matt Caldwell's murder has been attributed to his serial killer father and Logan's death ruled self-defense. Batista, however, remains suspicious of Dexter and has him legally declared alive. Dexter hears familiar details about the Ryan Foster murder and realizes his son Harrison is responsible. Despite his weakened condition, Dexter escapes the hospital and travels to New York City to find him.
2	2	"Camera Shy"	Marcos Siega	Scott Buck	July 11, 2025
Dexter investigates the crime scene at the hotel and cleans up blood spatter evidence that Harrison had missed. Dexter is urged by his Dark Passenger in the form of his deceased adoptive father, Harry, to guide his son, but he is reluctant to upend Harrison's life, preferring to protect him from a distance. Reclaiming his real identity, Dexter rents an apartment and buys a car, settling into life in New York. Dexter meets and befriends a UrCar rideshare driver named Blessing Kamara. While talking with Blessing, he learns of a serial killer called the Dark Passenger who is targeting rideshare drivers. Dexter identifies the killer as Ronald "Red" Schmidt, but chooses to save the life of Red's next victim over getting the kill, a change from how Dexter has operated in the past as he now cares about other people. After Dexter's disappearance, Angel attempts to find him with the help of Teddy. Haunted by his killings, Harrison sells Dexter's truck, which he still owns.
3	3	"Backseat Driver"	Monica Raymund	Nick Zayas	July 18, 2025
Dexter's work as a UrCar rideshare driver gets off to a rough start, which Blessing helps him to rectify. Dexter undergoes acupuncture with Blessing's daughter Joy, which restores his strength. Dexter acquires new kill tools from the Internet. Angel learns from Teddy that Dexter is in New York City and announces to Joey Quinn and Vince Masuka that he is retiring from the police force to chase after something. Harrison continues to grow closer to his co-worker Elsa, but becomes the prime suspect in Foster's murder. Rather than confess, Harrison reveals that he has been squatting in vacant rooms with Elsa's help as an alibi. Dexter successfully sets a trap for Red by setting himself up as the Dark Passenger's next victim and learns that Red is bitter because his cab driver father lost his job and killed himself because of rideshare apps driving him out of business. Before Dexter kills him, Red reveals that he was invited to a dinner party for serial killers, which Dexter decides to attend in Red's place.
4	4	"Call Me Red"	Monica Raymund	Alexandra Franklin & Marc Muszynski	July 25, 2025
Posing as Red, Dexter meets Leon Prater, a billionaire venture capitalist who secretly runs a society of serial killers and collects trophies celebrating infamous killers, including Arthur Mitchell, Brian Moser, and unknowingly Dexter himself. Dexter joins the group and bonds with Mia LaPierre, who targets sexual predators who escape justice after her sister was raped. Dexter kills Lowell to save his intended victim and, inspired by Prater, resumes collecting blood slide trophies. Angel arrives in New York and unsuccessfully tries to convince Harrison to reveal what he knows about Dexter. After learning of Foster's murder, Angel offers his help to the NYPD but keeps his suspicions about Harrison secret, determined to find Dexter while protecting Harrison. Meanwhile, Harrison struggles with guilt over Foster's death and nearly turns himself in after meeting Angel and being rejected by Elsa following an attempted kiss. Dexter reveals himself to Harrison and stops him.
5	5	"Murder Horny"	Marcos Siega	Katrina Mathewson & Tanner Bean	August 1, 2025
Dexter reunites with Harrison, who reveals Batista is hunting him. Harrison opens up about his guilt, but is reluctant to have his father back in his life. Harrison continues to struggle with his guilt over Foster's murder and being a suspect in the investigation. To distract himself, Dexter spends more time with Mia and considers revealing the truth about his identity to her. Mia suggests collaborating on a kill, and Dexter discovers that Mia does not have a code, and will target anyone when the need to kill strikes her. Unable to kill Mia without drawing attention to himself, Dexter has her arrested as she is about to kill her next victim and frames her for Foster's murder. Prater orders Charley to deal with Mia. She promises Mia that her stay in prison will be comfortable and short. Dexter finally opens up to his son and promises not to try to mold him in his image anymore, and the two begin to rebuild their relationship.
6	6	"Cats and Mouse"	Marcos Siega	Kirsa Rein	August 8, 2025
Dexter and Harrison continue to grow closer and attend the wake of Blessing's mother, Prudence, together. After snapping at Dexter, Blessing opens up about his painful past as a child soldier for the Revolutionary United Front. Harrison considers attending New York University. While babysitting for Elsa, he is deeply disturbed by his fantasy about killing her neglectful landlord, Vinny. Angel tells Wallace and Oliva his suspicions about Dexter and Harrison, but before they can question Mia, Charley bribes a guard to kill her and make it look like a suicide. Dexter stalks his next target, Gareth the Gemini Killer. Gareth in turn stalks Dexter back to his apartment, where Dexter offers him a drink laced with M99 before killing him. Prater invites Dexter on a trip with the rest of the group. At the meeting place, as Dexter heads to Prater's helicopter, he thinks about how suspicious it is that members of Prater's circle are disappearing at the pace that they are right after he joined. To Dexter's shock, Gareth arrives and boards the helicopter, revealing that the Gemini Killer is in fact identical twin brothers.
7	7	"Course Correction"	Monica Raymund	Story by : Hilly Hicks Jr. & Edith D. Rodríguez; Teleplay by : Hilly Hicks Jr.	August 15, 2025
Prater's killers are taken to a rented castle for a retreat, where Dexter, posing as Red, cryptically discusses his true self. Inspired by Dexter, Prater opens up about his troubled past and friendship with the serial killer who murdered his parents. Dexter reveals to the remaining Gemini Killer that he killed his brother, prompting an attack that Dexter kills in self-defense while framing him for Lowell's death. Back in New York, Dexter accompanies Harrison on a college visit as he considers a career in law enforcement. They attend a lecture by Detective Wallace about the unidentified New York Ripper, whom Wallace failed to catch. After recognizing the Ripper's murder weapon in Prater's collection, Dexter offers Wallace advice on the case. Angel visits Blessing's house to meet Dexter, who warns him to stay away from him and Harrison. Angel refuses, determined to avenge his friends, so Dexter forces him out of the car. Before leaving, Angel secretly places his AirPods in the passenger door to track Dexter's location.
8	8	"The Kill Room Where It Happens"	Monica Raymund	Story by : Tony Saltzman & Dane Anderson; Teleplay by : Tony Saltzman	August 22, 2025
A suspicious Charley investigates Dexter, who prepares to kill Al, but Al decides to go home to Wisconsin early, leaving Dexter unable to kill him. Dexter's attempts to help heal the relationship between Blessing and his daughter only cause more issues when Dexter breaks Blessing's confidence by telling Joy that her father was a child soldier. Harrison applies for college and spends the night with his new friend Gigi. With Elsa's situation worsening, Dexter abducts her landlord, Vinny, to his kill room in a wig shop and threatens him into treating his tenants better before releasing him. Having been tracking Dexter, Angel finds the kill room, but Dexter escapes and then finds and destroys the AirPods. Without evidence to back up his assertions and the laws that he broke chasing Dexter, Angel's credibility is damaged with Wallace and Oliva. Wallace later calls Quinn, who reveals that Angel has left the police force, a detail Angel had failed to share with her. As Dexter has dinner with Harrison, they are approached by Prater, who has learned of Harrison's existence.
9	9	"Touched by an Ángel"	Marcos Siega	Story by : Matt Venne; Teleplay by : Scott Reynolds	August 29, 2025
Evading Prater's questions, Dexter flees the restaurant with Harrison, explaining the recent events to him. Harrison is later cornered and questioned by Charley who he provides a version of the truth to. Furious, Dexter tracks her down in her car and strangleholds her. He spares Charley only when she reveals that working for Prater is the only way she can afford her mother's cancer treatments. Angel continues his pursuit of Dexter, but the revelation that he is operating outside of the law results in Wallace cutting his access. Unaware of who Prater truly is, Angel approaches him and reveals Dexter's true identity. Prater then summons Dexter to his vault and offers to be his new benefactor if he murders Angel. Dexter instead cuts his friend free, and Angel immediately attacks Dexter in a rage before being fatally shot by Prater, who locks Dexter in the vault. Dexter confesses that he is the Bay Harbor Butcher, but that he did not kill James Doakes and María LaGuerta. Angel dies cursing Dexter's name, leaving Dexter devastated.
10	10	"And Justice for All..."	Marcos Siega	Story by : Clyde Phillips & Alexandra Franklin & Marc Muszynski; Teleplay by : Clyde Phillips	September 5, 2025
Trapped in the vault, Dexter hallucinates with Brian Moser before locating Batista's phone and contact Harrison. Harrison sneaks into the gala as a waiter but is caught by Charley. Searching the vault, Dexter finds Prater's serial killer files and a dossier on Charley, which he uses to blackmail her. Furious over Prater's betrayal, Charley quits and leaves New York with her mother. Dexter deduces that the vault code is the inmate number of the man who killed Prater's parents, but Prater captures Harrison and attempts to kill them both. Harrison, protected with M99 given to him by Dexter, knocks Prater unconscious, allowing Dexter to kill him. Dexter retrieves his blood slides and triggers the vault alarm while escaping. The NYPD finds Batista's body, the murder weapon bearing Prater's fingerprints, assuming Prater has fled, and the New York Ripper file, revealing his name as Don Framt. Dexter dumps Prater's body in New York Harbor and takes his files and yacht to continue hunting.

=== Season 2 (2026) ===
No. overall	No. in season	Title	Directed by	Written by	Original release date
11	1	"Risky Business"	Marcos Siega	Clyde Phillips & Scott Reynolds	October 30, 2026
Three years after killing Prater, Dexter has killed two serial killers using the files, while Harrison prepares to graduate from the police academy. Wallace and Oliva repeatedly interrogate Framt, identified as the New York Ripper, but fail to obtain a confession, and NYPD Homicide Captain Mixon urges them to find evidence against him. After a murder in Pennsylvania with Al's modus operandi reveals his whereabouts, Dexter tracks him down, missing Harrison's graduation. He takes Al to a body shop and attempts to inject him with M99, but a struggle ensues. Dexter manages to kill Al by hanging him with a hoist chain. In New York, a new killer, calling himself the Five Borough Killer, announces a murder to the NYPD before fatally shooting a woman in a parking lot. The following day, he AirDrops the footage of the killing to a woman. Back home, Dexter begins craving recognition for his killings, but Harry warns him of the dangers and that he is going through a midlife crisis.
12	2	"Fallen"	Marcos Siega	Scott Buck	November 6, 2026
Harrison joins Homicide division, discovering Fiona Mixon, his one-night stand, is his training officer. After discovering Dexter killed Al, Charley offers to help him find the JawSplitter and the Sleepy-Eyed Stranger. Quinn, now a private investigator searching for Prater, visits Dexter and, when mentioning Prater's empty Bay Harbor Butcher booth, Dexter decides to watch him lest he uncover the truth about Prater's death. Dexter stalks Framt, famous after being accused of being the New York Ripper, and asks Harrison to let him kill him, but Harrison tells him to let Wallace catch him. Dexter accepts Charley's offer and asks her to lure the killers to New York, claiming Prater has arranged a meeting. Charley invites Ray Ballard, the Sleepy-Eyed Stranger, and shows Dexter where to kill him. With nowhere left to dispose of bodies, Dexter gets a boat from Charley. On Broadway, they witness the Five Borough Killer kill a man by throwing him off a rooftop, and Dexter sees the killer face-to-face.
13	3	"Live Free and Die"	Erica Dunton	Alexandra Franklin & Marc Muszynski	November 13, 2026
Dexter fails to catch the Five Borough Killer, who escapes but cannot identify him from a blurry video. Framt provokes Wallace with a song, and feigns an injury from her. He then sues the NYPD, and Mixon removes her from the New York Ripper case. Dexter helps Harrison sketch the killer and meets with Quinn, who traced Prater's bank accounts to properties including Dexter and Charley's house. Wallace tells Oliva that her first case involved a New York Ripper victim. The song Framt sang at the crime scene played in the victim's apartment, leaving Wallace with no doubt he is the killer. She recalls seeing him on the stairs and regrets not catching him, but Oliva urges her to focus on the Five Borough Killer. At the house, Dexter learns Ray has brought a victim to kill in front of Prater. He and Charley follow Ray to locate the victim; Dexter sedates Ray, alerts Quinn, and then kills Ray. Harrison shares his frustration with Dexter over the justice system's failure to catch criminals like Framt and the Five Borough Killer.
14	4	"Young Blood"	Erica Dunton	Katrina Mathewson & Tanner Bean	November 20, 2026
Wallace and Oliva discover that the Five Borough Killer has planned for years his plan, and she theorizes he lives or works in Manhattan, where both AirDrops occurred. When the JawSplitter arrives, Dexter and Charley are surprised to find a young man instead of 70-year-old John Thomas. He reveals he is John Thomas Jr., trained by his father to inherit his activities and name before his death. Unsure whether he fits the code, Dexter spends the day with him and kills him after he confesses he killed his father. After the Five Borough Killer warns that he will kill someone on the subway, the NYPD deploys officers on trains, including Harrison and Fiona. Dexter then visits Charley, but she says she is leaving and they won't see each other again. Oliva and Wallace discover a man died from thallium poisoning in the subway, which the Five Borough Killer AirDrops to the NYPD precinct. After this, Harrison asks Dexter to kill Framt. Dexter is later shocked to see at his door someone he thought was dead.
15	5	"Out of the Past"	TBA	Matt Venne & Edith D. Rodriguez	November 27, 2026
16	6	"Panic Attack"	TBA	Nick Zayas	December 4, 2026
17	7	"Game On"	TBA	Kirsa Rein	December 11, 2026
18	8	"Rule Number One"	TBA	Veronica West	December 18, 2026
19	9	"Credit Where Credit Is Due"	TBA	Story by : Jon Lazar & Dane Anderson; Teleplay by : Scott Reynolds	December 25, 2026
20	10	"Now You See Me"	TBA	Story by : Clyde Phillips & Marc Muszynski; Teleplay by : Clyde Phillips	January 1, 2027

== Production ==
=== Development ===
On July 26, 2024, at San Diego Comic-Con during the Dexter: Original Sin panel, a sequel series to Dexter: New Blood titled as Dexter: Resurrection was announced. It is developed by Clyde Phillips who is also serving as an executive producer and the showrunner. On January 7, 2025, Michael C. Hall, Scott Reynolds, Tony Hernandez, Lilly Burns, and Marcos Siega were added as executive producers. Production companies involved with the series are Showtime Studios and Counterpart Studios. According to Hall and Phillips, Resurrection is designed to have multiple seasons.

By August 2025, a writer's room for the second season was in preparation for pre-production, despite no renewal by that point, set to start on October 6, 2025. On October 8, 2025, Showtime renewed the series for a second season with Paramount Television Studios assuming production when producer Showtime Studios was folded into the revived studio.

=== Writing ===
In the second season, the series will return to the formula of the original series, Dexter, where – in addition to a season-long "Big Bad" storyline – weekly episodes will feature "little bads".

=== Casting ===
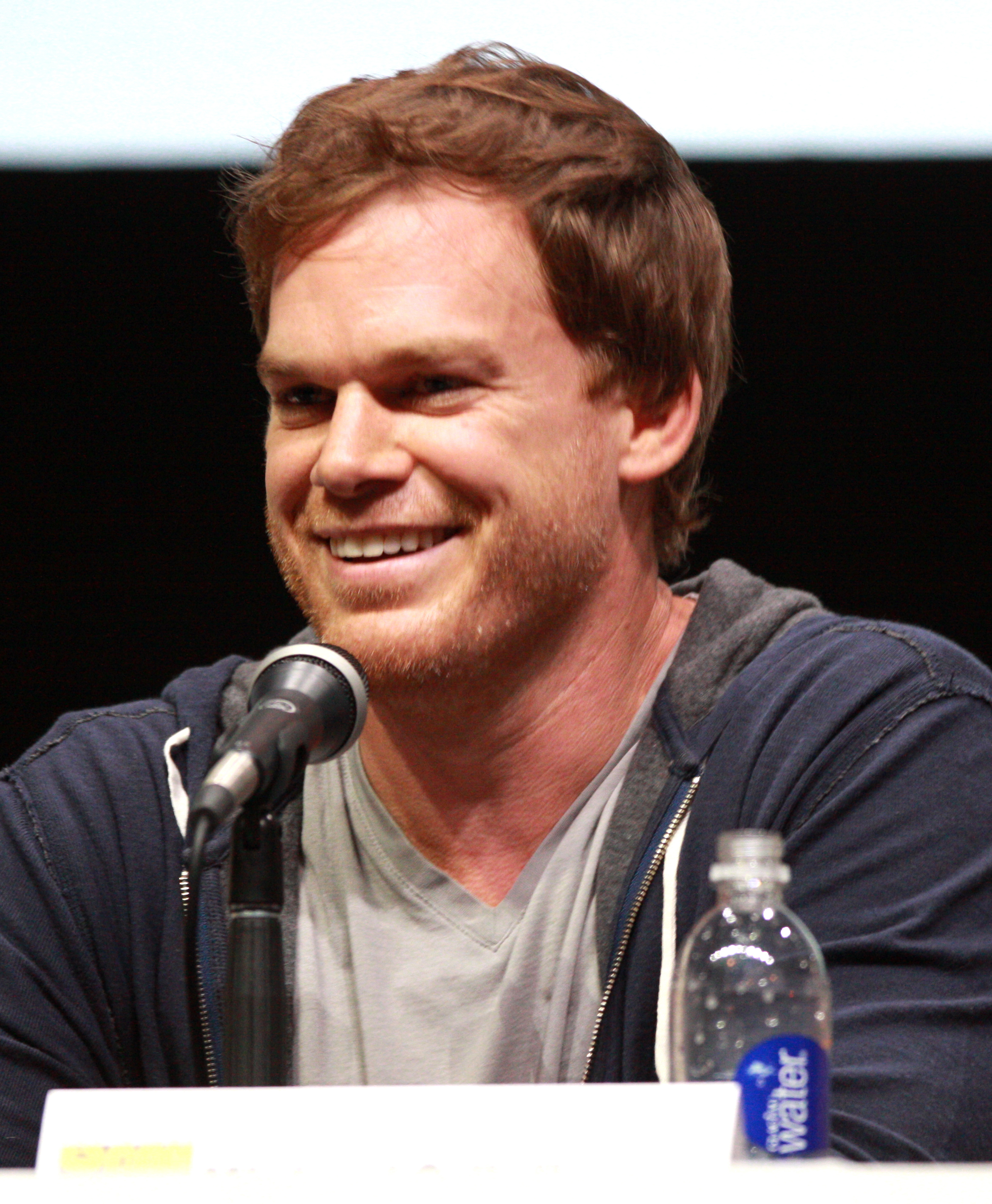
Michael C. Hall reprises his role as Dexter Morgan.

Upon the series sequel announcement, Hall was confirmed to reprise his role as Dexter Morgan. On January 7, 2025, David Zayas, Jack Alcott, and James Remar joined the cast to reprise their roles as Angel Batista, Harrison Morgan, and Harry Morgan as series regulars. A few weeks later, Uma Thurman was cast as a series regular. In February 2025, Peter Dinklage, Ntare Guma Mbaho Mwine, Kadia Saraf, Dominic Fumusa and Emilia Suárez joined the cast as a series regular while Krysten Ritter was cast in a guest role as serial killer Mia LaPierre / Lady Vengeance. In March 2025, Neil Patrick Harris, Eric Stonestreet and David Dastmalchian were respectively cast as Lowell / the Tattoo Collector, Al / Rapunzel and Gareth / Gemini Killer in guest role, with Steve Schirripa joining in a recurring capacity. John Lithgow revealed in an interview that he will reprise his role as Arthur Mitchell / Trinity Killer. In the same month, David Magidoff joined cast to reprise his role as Teddy Reed in a recurring capacity. In late March 2025, Jimmy Smits was confirmed to be reprising his role as Miguel Prado. In April 2025, Marc Menchaca and Reese Antoinette were cast in guest roles. On June 1, 2025, Erik King was confirmed to be reprising his role of James Doakes.

In April 2026, it was reported that Brian Cox, Dan Stevens, Bokeem Woodbine, and Nona Parker Johnson had joined the cast as series regulars for the second season as Don Framt / the New York Ripper, Owen Stark / the Five Borough Killer, Captain Mixon and Fiona Mixon, respectively. The same month, Desmond Harrington was promoted to a series regular role for the second season, reprising the character of Joey Quinn from the original series, while set photos would reveal Kane Hodder and Chris Jericho as having been added to the cast. In July, Gabriel Luna was cast in a guest capacity as Ray Ballard / the Sleepy-Eyed Stranger. With the release of a first look for the second season, it was revealed that Shavo Odadjian would appear in the season as R.H. Martin.

=== Filming ===
Principal photography for the first season began on January 9, 2025, in New York City, and concluded on June 18.

In January 2026, it was announced production for the second season would take place at Sunset Pier 94 Studios in Manhattan, New York. According to The Hollywood Reporter, by remaining in New York, the series received an additional 10-percent tax credit on top of the 30-percent credit they received during the first season's production. Filming for the second season began on April 13, 2026, and concluded on September 19.

== Release ==
Dexter: Resurrection premiered on Paramount+ Premium on July 11, 2025, with its two first episodes, while remaining episodes were released on a weekly basis up until the season finale on September 5. The second season premiered on October 30, 2026, and the remaining nine episodes will be released on a weekly basis until the season finale on January 1, 2027.

== Reception ==
=== Audience viewership ===
Dexter: Resurrection became Showtime's most-streamed premiere, drawing 3.1 million global cross-platform viewers within its first three days, surpassing Dexter: Original Sin's streaming premiere record. It is 44% more than Original Sin and 76% more than Dexter: New Blood.

=== Critical response ===
Critical response of Dexter: Resurrection
Season	Rotten Tomatoes	Metacritic
1	95% (64 reviews)	65 (17 reviews)
2	85% (15 reviews)	75 (5 reviews)

Review aggregator website Rotten Tomatoes reported a 95% approval rating for the first season, based on 64 critic reviews, with an average rating of 7.55/10. The website's critics consensus reads: "Dexter brushes off a minor case of death and multiple false endings to reemerge as vital as ever in a knowingly absurd continuation that rediscovers the thrill of the hunt." Metacritic, which uses a weighted average, assigned a score of 65 out of 100, based on 17 critics, indicating "generally favorable" reviews.

Alison Herman of Variety criticized the series for feeling creatively unnecessary and overly reliant on nostalgia despite the seemingly definitive ending of Dexter: New Blood, though praised the performances of Michael C. Hall, Peter Dinklage and Uma Thurman, noting that the series largely revisits familiar elements rather than justifying its return. Kristen Baldwin from Entertainment Weekly criticized the series as another unnecessary revival that reflects an overreliance on franchise extensions, noting its familiar and sometimes predictable storytelling but praising the performance of Hall and the appeal of its supporting cast. She concluded that it offers some entertainment value for fans despite not being essential viewing.

The second season holds an 85% approval rating on review aggregator Rotten Tomatoes, based on 15 critic reviews, with an average rating of 7.05/10. Metacritic, which uses a weighted average, assigned a score of 75 out of 100, based on 5 critics, indicating "generally favorable" reviews.

=== Awards and nominations ===
Award	Date of ceremony (Note: The year listed refers to when the awards ceremony took place, not necessarily when the nominated episode was released. Where available, it is linked to the article for that ceremony.)	Category	Recipient	Result	Ref.
Astra Creative Arts Awards	December 11, 2025	Best Casting – Television	Dexter: Resurrection	Nominated	
Astra Creative Arts Awards	December 11, 2025	Best Main Title Design – Television	Dexter: Resurrection	Nominated	
Critics' Choice Super Awards	August 6, 2026	Best Actor in a Horror Series, Limited Series or Made-for-TV Movie	Michael C. Hall	Nominated	
Critics' Choice Super Awards	August 6, 2026	Best Horror Series, Limited Series or Made-for-TV Movie	Dexter: Resurrection	Nominated	
Critics' Choice Super Awards	August 6, 2026	Best Villain in a Series, Limited Series or Made-for-TV Movie	Peter Dinklage	Nominated	
Hollywood Music in Media Awards	November 19, 2025	Best Music Supervision – TV Show/Limited Series	Sean Fernald	Won	
Imagen Awards	August 21, 2026	Best Supporting Actor – Drama	David Zayas	Nominated	
Saturn Awards	March 8, 2026	Best Actor in a Television Series	Michael C. Hall	Nominated	
Saturn Awards	March 8, 2026	Best Guest Star in a Television Series	David Dastmalchian	Won	
Saturn Awards	March 8, 2026	Best Guest Star in a Television Series	Peter Dinklage	Nominated	
Saturn Awards	March 8, 2026	Best Supporting Actor in a Television Series	Jack Alcott	Nominated	
Saturn Awards	March 8, 2026	Best Supporting Actress in a Television Series	Uma Thurman	Nominated	
Saturn Awards	March 8, 2026	Best Thriller Television Series	Dexter: Resurrection	Won	
