= Touched by an Ángel =

- Dexter: Resurrection episode
- Dexter Morgan (Michael C. Hall) leans over Angel Batista (David Zayas) after he has been shot by Leon Prater (Peter Dinklage).
- Episode no.: Season 1 Episode 9
- Directed by: Marcos Siega
- Story by: Matt Venne
- Teleplay by: Scott Reynolds
- Cinematography by: Joe Collins
- Editing by: Perri Frank
- Original air date: August 29, 2025
- Running time: 47 minutes

Guest appearances
- Jason Alan Carvell as Stefan Pike; Darius Jordan Lee as Lance Thomas; Emily Kimball as Gigi

Episode chronology
← Previous "The Kill Room Where It Happens"	Next → "And Justice for All..."

"Touched by an Ángel" is the ninth episode of the American crime drama mystery television series Dexter: Resurrection, sequel to Dexter and Dexter: New Blood. The episode was written by executive producer Scott Reynolds from a story by Matt Venne, and directed by executive producer Marcos Siega. It was released on Paramount+ with Showtime on August 29, 2025, and aired on Showtime two days later.

The series is set following the events of Dexter: New Blood, and it follows Dexter Morgan, who has recovered from his near-fatal gunshot wound. After realizing that his son Harrison is now working as a hotel bellhop in New York City, he sets out to find him. During this, his old friend Angel Batista returns to talk with Dexter over unfinished business. In the episode, Dexter's life is put in jeopardy when Prater and Charley try to find more about him, while Angel continues following Dexter.

The episode received critical acclaim, with critics praising the closure to Angel's storyline, ending, character development and performances.

== Plot ==
Prater introduces himself as a UrCar passenger that Dexter Morgan met, finding Harrison's name and where he works. He privately tells "Red" that he wants to know him better, scheduling a meeting so he can share details of his life, promising to not meet Harrison again. Dexter agrees, but subsequently leaves with Harrison to the subway, explaining his connection to Prater. Noticing Angel Batista boarding, Dexter leaves before the doors close.

Charley stalks Harrison at the hotel, getting him to reveal more of his past and using his fingerprints from a glass. Upon learning this, Dexter asks Blessing to pick him up when his shift ends to hide him. He breaks into Charley's house, finding her ill mother and discovering they are both from Delta Force. He garrotes Charley in her car and forces her to reveal that Prater made her his henchwoman as he helped pay for her mother's bills. Dexter lets her go, with Prater fascinated by her marks. Dexter calls Prater, arranging to meet before the gala, with Dexter planning to kill him.

While checking the new lead provided by Dexter on the New York Ripper, Claudette and Melvin confront Angel for operating outside the law. Despite his pleas, he is told to leave the city or face arrest. On his way out, he recognizes a picture of Prater for the gala, having saw him with Dexter. He goes to the gala and gets to talk with Prater to warn about "Red", revealing his identity as Dexter Morgan.

Dexter arrives at Prater's mansion, but is held at gunpoint by Charley after Prater calls him Dexter. He leads him to the vault, where Angel is strapped to a table. Prater reveals his excitement that Dexter is the Bay Harbor Butcher and offers to be his benefactor, but he first must kill Angel to show he adheres to it. Dexter seemingly accepts, but instead cuts Angel free and Angel immediately attacks Dexter in a rage, strangling him until Prater shoots Angel multiple times in the back. Prater then turns the gun on Dexter, failing to hit him before Charley pulls Prater away and the two lock him in the vault with Angel. Dexter rushes to Angel's side and confesses that he is the Bay Harbor Butcher but did not kill James Doakes (Note: As depicted in "The British Invasion".) and María LaGuerta. (Note: As depicted in "Surprise, Motherfucker!".) Angel rejects this, however, stating that Dexter is still responsible for their deaths, and now his death. He utters "Dexter Morgan... fuck you" before dying, and a devastated Dexter screams in rage and anguish.

== Production ==
=== Development ===
In May 2025, the episode's title was revealed to be "Touched by an Ángel". The episode was written by executive producer Scott Reynolds from a story by Matt Venne, and directed by executive producer Marcos Siega. This marked Reynolds' second writing credit, Venne's first writing credit, and Siega's fifth directing credit.

=== Writing ===
The episode features the death of Angel Batista, who made his debut back in the original pilot. David Zayas was informed of his character's death since the beginning of the season, "We approached it from the beginning, full-heartedly and trying to do the best work we could, and telling the story as best as we could." He added, "I think that with the circumstances these great writers wrote for Dexter: Resurrection, with the momentum of where Batista [was] going — to try and get justice from Dexter — I think it's the right way to tell the story."

Regarding Angel's dying words, Zayas said, "To be honest, the first time I read the script, I said, ‘I don't know if I want to say this.’ But then I realized this has to be it. It's not necessarily just about you. It's about progressing the story of Dexter: Resurrection, and what comes next for Dexter." He added, "The one thing I love about the character of Angel Batista is he kept it real to the end. He didn't say, “Oh, it's okay.” No, he kept it real till the end. “This is why I'm here. I gave it my best shot. But you know what? Fuck you.”" Nevertheless, he suggested he was not opposed to returning in some capacity, adding "never say never."

== Reception ==
"Touched by an Ángel" received critical acclaim. Louis Peitzman of Vulture gave the episode a perfect 5 star rating out of 5 and wrote, "I thought the penultimate episode of this season might be about putting the pieces in place for an explosive finale, so I was admittedly caught off guard by the tragic ending. Also, as a person of Donnie Darko experience, playing Gary Jules's cover of “Mad World” over the credits is the easiest way to wring tears out of me — it almost feels like cheating. I can't really be mad, though. Dexter: Resurrection has earned this moment, delivering a consistently strong season with a gripping plot and high emotional stakes. It's the most I've cared about this franchise in many, many years."

Shawn Van Horn of Collider gave the episode an 9 out of 10 rating and wrote, ""Dexter Morgan, fuck you," Angel says as his last words, before slipping over into death. Instead of being relieved, Dexter screams with everything inside of him. Leon Prater is as good as dead." Mads Misasi of Telltale TV gave the episode a 3.8 out of 5 star rating and wrote, "Dexter: Resurrection Season 1 Episode 9, “Touched by an Ángel,” is a perfect character study in how Harrison can be both the best and worst thing going on in Dexter's life at the present time. Dexter is a more well-rounded person because of Harrison, but he also is more likely to slip up due to impulsive urges."

Greg MacArthur of Screen Rant wrote, "It works and it's fine, but after what was one of the best Dexter seasons of all time, I was just hoping for something more thrilling and satisfying. Dexter will likely kill Prater in the finale, and perhaps Batista's death will inspire Quinn to go after Dex in Dexter: Resurrection season 2, if it doesn't get "un-renewed" like Original Sin." Carissa Pavlica of TV Fanatic gave the episode a 4.75 star rating out of 5 and wrote, "My hands are shaking. My chest is tight. Mad World playing over the credits was almost too on the nose, because that's exactly how I feel right now: shattered. The Dexter universe has become unmoored."

=== Accolades ===
TVLine named Uma Thurman as an honorable mention for the "Performer of the Week" for the week of August 30, 2025, for her performance in the episode. The site wrote, "Uma Thurman's Charley is a vibe in the penultimate episode of Dexter: Resurrection, but don't let her fool you. She is not one to mess with. After surprising Harrison with a grilling at the hotel, Thurman served up icy, cold stares and steady diction that was both threatening and calculated. After the actress reveled in her character's power, we saw the predator become prey when Dexter surprised her with a wire to the throat in the backseat of her car. As he confronted her about her military background and mother's illness, Thurman's eyes watered and her fear filled the frame. Bringing those heavy feelings to the surface, the actress showed us just how much Charley loved her mother and was scared of Leon Prater. Though we wish Thurman had gotten to flex more of her talent this season, Episode 9 finally gave her some big emotions to play with, a task she was more than ready to take on."
