= Terry Serpico =

American film and television actor

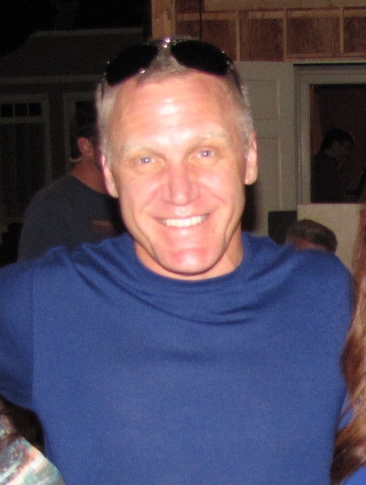
- Serpico in 2012
- Born: Fort Sill, Lawton, Oklahoma, U.S.
- Education: Boston University; State University of New York, Purchase (BFA)
- Occupation: Actor
- Years active: 1992–present
- Spouse: Kadia Saraf (m. 2022)

Terry Serpico is an American film and television actor.

== Personal life ==
Serpico was born in Fort Sill in Lawton, Oklahoma, the youngest of three children. He became interested in acting after graduating from high school. He attended Boston University before transferring to and graduating from the State University of New York at Purchase in 1989. He is of German and Italian descent. Serpico married Kadia Saraf on June 8, 2022, in Beacon, New York. They met on set of Law & Order: Special Victims Unit.

== Career ==
Serpico began his career as a stunt performer. In 1997, he was cast in his first major acting role in Donnie Brasco. In television, Serpico has guest-starred on such shows as Law & Order, CSI: Miami, Law & Order: Criminal Intent, and Person of Interest.

He played Mickey Mantle in the ESPN miniseries The Bronx Is Burning. He has had a recurring role in Rescue Me, and a starring role as Maj./Lt. Col./Col. Frank Sherwood in Army Wives.

Serpico appeared in a recurring role as New York Special Victims Unit Chief Tommy McGrath on Law & Order: Special Victims Unit.

== Filmography ==
=== Film ===
List of film roles
Year	Title	Role	Notes
1995	Cyber Vengeance	Montgomery Valentine	
1997	Cop Land	Tony	
1997	Donnie Brasco	Strip Club Owner	
1997	The Peacemaker	Sniper #1	
1999	Random Hearts	Evidence Technician	
1999	Bringing Out the Dead	Cop #1	
2000	Frequency	Con Ed Worker	
2001	Hannibal	Officer Bolton	
2001	Vendetta	Terenzio Aprea	
2004	Company K	Sergeant Dunning	
2005	The Interpreter	FBI Agent Lewis	
2006	The Departed	Detective Tailing Queenan	
2006	Find Me Guilty	FBI Agent Michael Kerry	
2007	Michael Clayton	Mr. Iker	
2008	Righteous Kill	Jon Van Luytens	
2009	The Men Who Stare at Goats	Krom - Phil Driver	
2010	Angel Camouflaged	Mr. Belial	
2011	Montauk	Jim	Short
2012	Man on a Ledge	Lutz	
2012	Premium Rush	Policeman in Park	Uncredited
2014	Intersection	Dwayne	Short
2015	Firmly Grounded	Hoffman	Short
2016	The Purge: Election Year	Earl Danzinger	
2016	The 5th Wave	Hutchfield	
2016	Isle of Palms	Hugo	Short
2017	The Two Worlds of William March	Sgt Dunning	
2018	Nappily Ever After	Bill	
2019	Mine 9	Zeke	
2020	I Still Believe	Mark	
2021	Faceless	Dr. Klein	
2021	Birdie	Andy Flannagan	
2022	Minutemen	Lewis	Short

=== Television ===
List of television roles and appearances
Year	Title	Role	Notes
1992	All My Children	Bernard Flater	(1 Episode)
1997	Oz	Rebadow's Client/Freakie	(2 episodes) 1997, 1999
1999	Earthly Possessions	Gas Station Attendant	TV Movie
2000	Third Watch	Lofton	("This Band of Brothers")
2000	Law & Order	Frank Miller/Jay Brannigan/Tommy McGrath	(3 episodes) 2000, 2002, 2022
2000	Law & Order: Special Victims Unit	Various Characters; Police Chief Tommy McGrath	(4 episodes) 2000–2013; 2021–2024, recurring role
2000	Homicide: The Movie	Karl Miller	TV Movie
2001	100 Centre Street	Unknown	(9 episodes) 2001–2002
2001	Law & Order: Criminal Intent	Leslie Roche/Earl Carnicki	(2 episodes) 2001, 2003
2001	Amy & Isabelle	Jake Cunningham	TV Movie
2004	Line of Fire	Kyle Bowen	(2 episodes)
2005	Rescue Me	Eddie Gavin	(15 episodes) 2005–2010
2005	Jonny Zero	Leo	("Pilot")
2006	The Path to 9/11	Pulaski	(2 episodes)
2007	Army Wives	Major/ Lt. Col/ Colonel Frank Sherwood	(108 episodes) 2007–2013
2007	CSI: Miami	Steve Lancaster	("Guerillas in the Mist")
2007	Kidnapped	Virgil's Boss	("Gone Fishing")
2007	The Bronx Is Burning	Mickey Mantle	
2009	Kings	Dock Worker	("Chapter One")
2011	Body of Proof	Ray Easton	("Point of Origin")
2012	Person of Interest	Byron	(2 episodes) 2012–2013
2012	NYC 22	Pete Glenroy	("Samaritans")
2013	Unforgettable	Arnold/Tucker Griffin	
2013	The Carrie Diaries	Mr. Kydd	(4 episodes) 2013–2014
2014	Blue Bloods	Major Harrison	("Unfinished Business")
2014	Criminal Minds	Wick Griffith	("Fatal")
2014	Drop Dead Diva	Max Toblin	(2 episodes)
2014	Day One	Larry Flerpico	("The New Outfit")
2015	Elementary	Wallace Turk	("Under My Skin")
2015	The Inspectors	Mitch Ohlmeyer	(106 episodes) 2015–2019, main role
2015	The Ivy League Farmer	Anders Gilbert	TV Movie
2015	TURN: Washington's Spies	Captain Ryder	("Men of Blood")
2016	Limitless	David Englander	("Stop Me Before I Hug Again")
2017	Sneaky Pete	Hopper	(3 episodes)
2017	The Adventures of Hooligan Squad in World War III	Hugo	TV Movie
2017	Mr. Mercedes	Chaz Chapman	("People in the Rain")
2017	Star Trek: Discovery	Admiral Brett Anderson	(2 episodes)
2018	The Good Fight	Officer Vince Torino	("Day 436")
2018	MacGyver	Lawlor	("Bravo Lead + Loyalty + Friendship")
2019	Designated Survivor	Patrick Lloyd	(7 episodes)
2019	Yellowstone	Teal Beck	(6 episodes)
2020	Homeland	General Owens	(3 episodes)
2020	The Flight Attendant	Bill Briscoe	(5 episodes)
2021	The Equalizer	Dan Erickson	("Shooter")
2021	The Mosquito Coast	Hershey	("The Glass Sandwich")
2021–2024	Hightown	Major Markson	(4 episodes)
2021–2022	Cobra Kai	Captain George Turner	(3 episodes)
2023–2024	Law & Order: Organized Crime	Chief Tommy McGrath	(2 episodes)
2024	Elsbeth	Doug Howe	("The Wrong Stuff")
2024	Power Book II: Ghost	Willey Adams	(3 episodes)
2025	Dark Winds	Senior Chief Ed Henry	("Ye'iitsoh (Big Monster)")
2025	The Waterfront	Emmett Parker	(3 episodes)
2025–2026	Chicago Fire	Mr. Cole	(2 episodes)
2026	FBI	Ernie Carver	("White Rock")
