= Nona Parker Johnson =

American actress

- Parker Johnson in 2026
- Born: Jackson, Mississippi, United States
- Occupation: Actress
- Years active: 2021–present

Nona Parker Johnson is an American actress. She is best known for playing Detective Carmen "Nova" Riley in the crime drama series Law & Order: Organized Crime and Fiona Mixon in the crime drama mystery series Dexter: Resurrection.

== Early life ==
Parker Johnson was born in Jackson, Mississippi. She attended Georgetown University where she studied theater and performance and received her Bachelors in Justice and Peace Studies with a focus on Social Justice Art and Performance. She attended University of Southern California where she graduated with a MFA in acting.

== Career ==
Her first big role came playing Detective Carmen "Nova" Riley in the crime drama series Law & Order: Organized Crime starring Chris Meloni. She had a recurring role as Ada in the post-apocalyptic horror drama series Fear the Walking Dead She played Rhonda in season 3 of the crime thriller Mayor of Kingstown. As of Summer 2026 she is starring as Fiona Mixon in the crime drama mystery series Dexter: Resurrection.

== Filmography ==
=== Film ===
Year	Title	Role	Notes
2023	Bizarro World	Woman	Short
2025	Missing Rhythms	Woman	Short
2025	Aisles	Naomi	Short
2026	Calabash	Iyana	Short

=== Television ===
Year	Title	Role	Notes
2021	Them	Martha	Episode: "Covenant II."
2021	The Handmaid's Tale	Volunteer at anti abortion centre	Episode: "Milk"
2021–2022	Law & Order: Organized Crime	Detective Carmen "Nova" Riley	18 episodes
2023	Fear the Walking Dead	Ada	3 episodes
2023–2024	Mayor of Kingstown	Rhonda	5 episodes
2025	High Potential	Penny Hall	Episode: "Obsessed"
2026	Sugar	Hannah McDaniels	3 episodes
2026	Dexter: Resurrection	Fiona Mixon	Main role (season 2)
