= Cats and Mouse =

- Dexter: Resurrection episode
- David Dastmalchian stars in the episode as the Gemini killer.
- Episode no.: Season 1 Episode 6
- Directed by: Marcos Siega
- Written by: Kirsa Rein
- Cinematography by: Joe Collins
- Editing by: Katie Ennis
- Original air date: August 8, 2025
- Running time: 56 minutes

Guest appearances
- Krysten Ritter as Mia LaPierre (special guest star); Eric Stonestreet as Al (special guest star); David Dastmalchian as Gareth; Steve Schirripa as Vinny; JillMarie Lawrence as Constance; Reese Antoinette as Joy; Oberon K. A. Adjepong as Chike; Will Rogers as Marc

Episode chronology
← Previous "Murder Horny"	Next → "Course Correction"

"Cats and Mouse" is the sixth episode of the American crime drama mystery television series Dexter: Resurrection, sequel to Dexter and Dexter: New Blood. The episode was written by co-executive producer Kirsa Rein, and directed by executive producer Marcos Siega. It was released on Paramount+ with Showtime on August 8, 2025, and aired on Showtime two days later.

The series is set following the events of Dexter: New Blood, and it follows Dexter Morgan, who has recovered from his near-fatal gunshot wound. After realizing that his son Harrison is now working as a hotel bellhop in New York City, he sets out to find him. During this, his old friend Angel Batista returns to talk with Dexter over unfinished business. In the episode, Dexter targets Gareth as his next victim, while Angel consults with NYPD on Lady Vengeance's case.

The episode received critical acclaim, who praised the performances, character development and twist ending.

== Plot ==
Blessing tells Dexter Morgan that his mother, Prudence, has died and invites him to her wake. In order to attend, Dexter cancels an appointment with Harrison, who surprises Dexter by showing up to his apartment with two suits, announcing he will attend the wake. Harrison is introduced to Blessing's family, and everyone shares their history with Prudence.

Charley goes to Red's apartment, finding it vacant, telling Prater that he is missing. Prater calls Dexter; still posing as Red, Dexter tells him he has not returned home since Charley broke in. Prater asks him to visit him at his mansion. Al and Gareth express their unease over Mia's arrest, fearing she might reveal their identities. Prater assures them he will take care of it. Targeting Gareth, Dexter follows him to a bookstore, finding that he has been leaving notes in books about his crimes. That night, Dexter continues helping Blessing's family during the wake, and Blessing snaps at Dexter for bringing too much ice.

Angel Batista arrives at the NYPD, and shares his suspicions that Harrison killed Ryan using methods taught to him by Dexter and that Dexter helped Harrison cover it up. The two express their suspicions of his claim but reluctantly accept him accompanying them to visit Mia. While babysitting Elsa's son, Dante, Harrison is confronted by Elsa's landlord, Vinny, as she is late with the rent. He says he will not fix the mold in Dante's room until she pays, and Harrison imagines harming him before he leaves.

Dexter returns to his apartment, only to find Gareth waiting for him, having discovered Dexter is following him. Dexter claims he idolizes Gareth and serves him gin and tonic laced with M99, causing him to lose consciousness. Dexter kills Gareth, but is forced to hide the body in his bathtub when Blessing unexpectedly knocks on his door. Blessing apologizes to Dexter for his behavior, detailing his history as a child soldier for the Revolutionary United Front, having been traumatized by atrocities committed. He reveals Prudence found and saved him and they both moved to the United States to start over. After he leaves, Dexter incinerate Gareth's corpse.

The following morning, Harrison tells Dexter that he fantasized about killing Vinny. Dexter comforts him, telling him he did good by controlling his urge by refusing to go forward with it. After Harrison leaves, Dexter is contacted by Charley, asking him to meet with her at the pier with his tools and trophies. Angel, Claudette and Melvin arrive at the prison to question Mia, when alarms sound off. The officers find Mia has seemingly hanged herself, and a guard pronounces her dead. In actuality, Charley bribed that guard to kill her. At the pier, Dexter and Al are invited by Prater to board a helicopter to an unknown location, still waiting for Gareth. To Dexter's shock, a man looking like Gareth arrives and boards the helicopter, realizing that Gemini are actually identical twin serial killers.

== Production ==
=== Development ===
In May 2025, the episode's title was revealed to be "Cats and Mouse". The episode was written by co-executive producer Kirsa Rein, and directed by executive producer Marcos Siega. This marked Rein's first writing credit, and Siega's fourth directing credit.

=== Writing ===
Krysten Ritter said that filming the episode was "exciting" because of the closure to Mia's arc. She said, "When I first read this script, it was like, 'okay, these cool three episodes, we're going to do it.' But then as I was there and in the skin of this character and having so much fun, there's not a day that goes by where we're not talking about how to do more with this character." Nevertheless, Ritter also added, "Maybe it's not the end of this character. We'll see." David Dastmalchian spoke about the episode's twist, wanting that when fans rewatch the series, "They'll start to notice the little differences between the performances that I gave," wanting to "infuse a lot of subtle details that the real die-hard fans who love this stuff would dig in."

== Reception ==
"Cats and Mouse" received critical acclaim. Louis Peitzman of Vulture gave the episode a 4 star rating out of 5 and wrote, "For the third week in a row, Dexter: Resurrection is firing on all cylinders—and I think the writers are taking my notes into account! Okay, yes, this episode was completed long before my complaint last week that Blessing and his family mostly exist as a constant reminder of Dexter's own fractured family, but we did get more from them in 'Cats & Mouse,' albeit under some sad circumstances."

Shawn Van Horn of Collider gave the episode an 8 out of 10 rating and wrote, "If you thought after three TV series that the world of Dexter Morgan had run out of things to do, oh, has Dexter: Resurrection been glad to prove you wrong. The latest dip into the life of our favorite serial killer hero has succeeded by shaking things up and getting away from the well-worn format of Dexter hiding who he is while fighting that season's big bad." Mads Misasi of Telltale TV gave the episode a 4.5 out of 5 star rating and wrote, "What's Dexter without a few close calls? Dexter: Resurrection Season 1 Episode 6, 'Cats and Mouse,' reminds us that despite how meticulous and regimented Dexter Morgan is he can still miss up from time to time."

Greg MacArthur of Screen Rant wrote, "As is the case with most of the people Dexter has tried to keep close to in his life, Harrison is on track to become a major weakness and liability for Dexter. He's Batista's link to catching and arresting Dexter while also being evidence to Prater that Dexter is an impostor. Dexter and Harrison may have to get out of New York City for these reasons by the end of Dexter: Resurrection season 1." Carissa Pavlica of TV Fanatic gave the episode a 4.5 star rating out of 5 and wrote, "We're entering endgame territory. And if Dexter thinks he's still the one playing cat and mouse, he's in for a very rude awakening."

=== Accolades ===
TVLine named Ntare Mwine as an honorable mention for the "Performer of the Week" for the week of August 9, 2025, for his performance in the episode. The site wrote, "Friday's Dexter: Resurrection dug deeper into the life of Blessing Kamara, setting up Ntare Guma Mbaho Mwine for a fine showcase that rummaged up a surplus of emotions. After Blessing's mother died, the actor exhibited deep loss and sadness at her funeral celebration. But the veneer of his Zen-like demeanor finally dissolved, causing the character to snap in anger at his son-in-law, an exchange that allowed him to showcase the many stages of grief. The best scene, however, came when Blessing detailed his horrific past life as a child soldier in Africa. Mwine delivered his monologue with an unsteady voice and devastation in his eyes as he recounted the gory details to Dexter with humility and regret. Our love for Blessing—and the actor who plays him—has us crossing all our fingers and toes that this kindhearted man can survive life inside Dexter's dangerous new inner circle."
