= Joey Quinn =

Fictional character in Dexter

- Dexter character
- Desmond Harrington as Joey Quinn
- First appearance: "Our Father"; Dexter; September 28, 2008
- Portrayed by: Desmond Harrington

In-universe information
- Full name: Joseph Quinn
- Gender: Male
- Occupation: Detective (formerly); Private investigator

Joseph Quinn is a fictional character in the Showtime television series Dexter, portrayed by Desmond Harrington. The character was introduced in season three. He appeared in 72 episodes, making him one of the most frequently appearing characters of the show.

In the series, Quinn was a detective who worked in narcotics before being transferred to the homicide division of Miami Metro. In 2020, Screen Rant listed Quinn as one of the most unlikable characters in Dexter.

Starting in 2025, Harrington reprised the role in Dexter: Resurrection, in which Quinn has been promoted to Lieutenant. He makes a guest appearance in season 1, and becomes a regular in season 2.

== Appearances ==
=== Dexter ===
==== Season three ====
Quinn first appears in the season opener, "Our Father," in which he is partnered with Debra Morgan (Jennifer Carpenter). He takes a liking to her, even helping her with a case by giving her one of his confidential informants. Quinn's past, as Debra is pressured by Internal Affairs agent Yuki Amado (Liza Lapira) to report him. Quinn uncovers Amado's investigation after Debra tells him about it, and he claims that her investigation of him is a "personal vendetta." Quinn has the Internal Affairs case dropped. He later confesses to Debra that Amado was once his partner and that she blames him for a colleague's death from a crystal methamphetamine overdose; Quinn knew about the man's addiction but tried to offer private help instead of informing his superiors.

==== Season four ====
In season four, Quinn bears a grudge against Dexter Morgan (Michael C. Hall) for botching the blood work for a case he worked on. However, after Dexter sees Quinn taking money from a crime scene, he tries to shut him up by buying him expensive football tickets. Meanwhile, Quinn starts a relationship with Christine Hill (Courtney Ford), a reporter who flirtatiously grills him for information on his cases. After a confidential police lead ends up in one of Hill's articles, Lt. María LaGuerta (Lauren Vélez) warns Quinn to be wary of any reporter who squeezes him for confidential information over pillow talk. Nonetheless, Quinn tells Hill about numerous police reports (supposedly "off the record"), and she uses this information to report that FBI agent Frank Lundy (Keith Carradine) has returned to Miami. Quinn breaks up with Hill after she publishes the article about Lundy, but the two soon get back together. Though more careful about what he says around her, Quinn still defends Hill when Dexter tells her to leave Debra alone, as Hill wanted to do a piece on her and a shooting she was involved in. Quinn denounces Hill after it is revealed that she is the Trinity Killer's daughter and had been manipulating him to keep her father from being arrested. After Hill commits suicide, however, he is clearly distraught.

==== Season five ====
In season five, Quinn comes to suspect that Dexter has murdered his wife Rita Bennett (Julie Benz) after learning that Rita shared a kiss with a neighbor, mixed with subtle differences in the modus operandi of the supposed killer, Arthur Mitchell (John Lithgow). The raid's timing that Dexter was part of the raid during Rita's time of death, he begins to focus on the composite sketches of "Kyle Butler" and determines it to be Dexter. Desperate for confirmation Mitchell's son Jonah (Brando Eaton), who was due to enter witness protection, he attempts to have him identify Dexter as Butler, but is caught by marshals and suspended.

Unable to continue, Quinn hires private investigator Stan Liddy (Peter Weller) to investigate Dexter. After a one-night stand with Debra, Quinn repeatedly tries to get her back into bed, eventually succeeding. Their budding romance hits a snag, until Debra discovers that Quinn was suspended by LaGuerta for investigating Dexter. To prove his commitment to Debra and dispel her doubts that his feelings for her are real, Quinn tells Liddy to drop his investigation of Dexter. Liddy delivers to Quinn pictures of Dexter and Lumen Pierce (Julia Stiles) disposing of a body. When Liddy is murdered, Quinn becomes a suspect because of the five phone calls Liddy placed to him directly prior to his death, as well as the blood on Quinn's boot. Dexter, who killed Liddy to protect himself and Lumen, fakes the blood report so Quinn will be eliminated as a suspect. Quinn goes to Dexter's son Harrison's birthday party with Debra, and thanks Dexter for his help.

==== Season six ====
At the start of season six, Quinn and Debra have been living together for a few months. Quinn proposes to Debra, but she turns him down because she wants their relationship to stay as it is. As a result, they break up. With Debra's concurrent promotion to Lieutenant, Quinn begins to resent her, believing she values her work more than she does him. He begins drinking heavily and having random one-night stands, once turning up to Debra's housewarming with a girl he flippantly refers to as "chick from the bar," and hitting on Batista's sister Jamie (Aimee Garcia). His womanizing also affects his work when he endangers the investigation of suspected "Doomsday Killer" Professor Gellar (Edward James Olmos) by sleeping with his assistant, an important material witness. Debra calls him into her office to tell him they can never be together. Quinn accepts her decision, albeit regretfully.

==== Season seven ====
When Miami Metro detective Mike Anderson (Billy Brown) is murdered by members of a Russian organized crime syndicate, Quinn goes with his new partner Angel Batista (David Zayas) to question the owners of one of the syndicate's strip clubs. He develops a relationship with Nadia (Katia Winter), one of the club's dancers. The club's owner, George Novikov (Jason Gedrick), offers to give Nadia a passport and her freedom if Quinn disposes of blood evidence linking the head of the syndicate, Isaak Sirko (Ray Stevenson), to three murders; if he does not comply, Novikov will send her to a sex club in Dubai. Quinn reluctantly disposes of the evidence and takes a bribe. Novikov does not keep his end of the bargain, however, and threatens to expose Quinn unless he goes on the syndicate's payroll. Soon afterward, Nadia tells Quinn that Novikov forced her to have sex with him. Enraged, Quinn beats Novikov up and kills him in cold blood after he hits Nadia. He stages the scene to look like he had acted in self-defense. Nadia gets her passport, but tells Quinn she has to move on. Quinn then gives the dirty money to Batista so he can open a restaurant.

==== Season eight ====
At the beginning of season eight, Quinn is in a relationship with Jamie Batista. However, he still has feelings for Debra, who had quit Miami Metro six months earlier to work as a private detective. In "What's Eating Dexter Morgan?", Debra is arrested for drunk driving, and calls him to bail her out, which arouses Jamie's suspicion and jealousy. When he punches a fellow detective for insulting Debra, Jamie asks him point-blank if he is still in love with Debra; Quinn says no. Later, Debra shows up at Miami Metro, blind drunk, and confesses to killing LaGuerta. Unaware that she is telling the truth, he calls Dexter and tells him that she is not in her right mind, and allows him to take her away. Later, she meets with him to apologize for her behavior, and wishes him happiness with Jamie.

Jamie asks Quinn to move in with her, which he does with some apprehension. In order to prove to her and her brother that he is taking his career seriously, he takes the sergeant's exam. He does well, but Batista ultimately chooses Angie Miller. Frustrated, Quinn tries to prove himself by investigating murder suspect — and Dexter's new "protege" — Zach Hamilton (Sam Underwood). The investigation puts him back in contact with Debra, and they share a kiss. Days later, he ends his relationship with Jamie, but denies that it has anything to do with Debra. When Debra returns to Miami Metro, however, they acknowledge their feelings for each other and renew their relationship.

In the series' final episode, "Remember the Monsters?", Debra is shot by serial killer Oliver Saxon (Darri Ingolfson). Quinn rides with her to the hospital, where she tells him she loves him. Soon afterward, however, she has a stroke that leaves her in a persistent vegetative state. Overcome with grief and rage, he attacks Saxon in Miami Metro's interrogation room. After Dexter kills Saxon in full view of a security camera, Quinn and Batista bring him in for questioning. Dexter claims self-defense, which they both appear to accept. Quinn says that he wishes he could have killed Saxon personally; it is suggested that he knows that Dexter murdered Saxon, but considers his actions justified.

=== Dexter: Resurrection ===
==== Season one ====
In "Backseat Driver," ten years after the death of Oliver Saxon, Quinn and Masuka learn that Batista is retiring from the police force and celebrate with him. Batista tells them that he intends to chase after something that continues to haunt him, but Batista doesn't tell his friends about his suspicions that Dexter is actually the Bay Harbor Butcher.

In "The Kill Room Where It Happens," Detective Claudette Wallace calls Quinn, who is now a Lieutenant, while he's at the scene of a murder to ask about the Bay Harbor Butcher case. Quinn is confused to be contacted about the case and even more confused to learn that Batista is actively pursuing it in New York City. Quinn reveals to a surprised Wallace that Batista is a good guy, but he had suddenly quit the force, and Quinn has no idea why he's in New York. In "And Justice For All...," Quinn calls Batista, leaving a voicemail in which he urges Batista to come home, unaware that his friend is dead. Dexter admits to himself that he misses Quinn and Masuka, but neither of them can help him. Quinn indirectly helps Dexter to escape from Leon Prater's vault because Dexter is able to follow the ringing from Quinn's call to Batista's cell phone, using it to call Harrison for help.

==== Season two ====
A few years later, Quinn arrives in New York City and asks to speak with Wallace. Quinn reunites with Dexter, having gotten his address from Wallace. Quinn greets Dexter warmly and has seemingly moved past his suspicions of the other man. Quinn reveals that he has left the police force and become a private investigator, working for the families of the victims of the serial killers associated with Prater. Quinn is trying to track Prater down, hoping to leverage him to find the killers and get justice for the victims and, obviously, Angel. To keep an eye on Quinn, Dexter offers his help on the case.

== Relationships ==
Quinn is known to have had very bad relationships with several women. In Season 4, Quinn dates the Trinity Killer's daughter, Christine Hill. However, this relationship ends when Christine is charged with murder for killing Frank Lundy to save her dad. He starts to have a relationship with Debra, and even proposes, but she breaks up with him because she does not want their relationship to change. He numbs the pain of that rejection with a series of one-night-stands, but by season eight is in a relationship with Jamie Batista. He ends this relationship to be with Debra, only to lose her shortly afterwards.
