= Jason Alan Carvell =

American television actor

- Education: Carnegie Mellon School of Drama
- Occupation: Television actor

Jason Alan Carvell is an American television actor. He is best known for playing Malcolm X in the American crime drama television series Godfather of Harlem.

Carvell guest-starred in television programs including Blue Bloods, Body of Proof, The Baker and the Beauty, Person of Interest, The Runarounds, Prime Suspect, The Mysteries of Laura and Elementary. He played the recurring roles of Obadiah in Ruthless, Stefan Pike in Dexter: Resurrection, Jimmy Boyd in NCIS: New Orleans and Anton Finch, the villainous treasure hunter in Outer Banks. In 2016, he appeared in his first and only film Better Off Single.

In 2026, Carvell signed with The Rosenzweig Group, "for management in all areas".
