= Kadia Saraf =

Swiss-Israeli actress

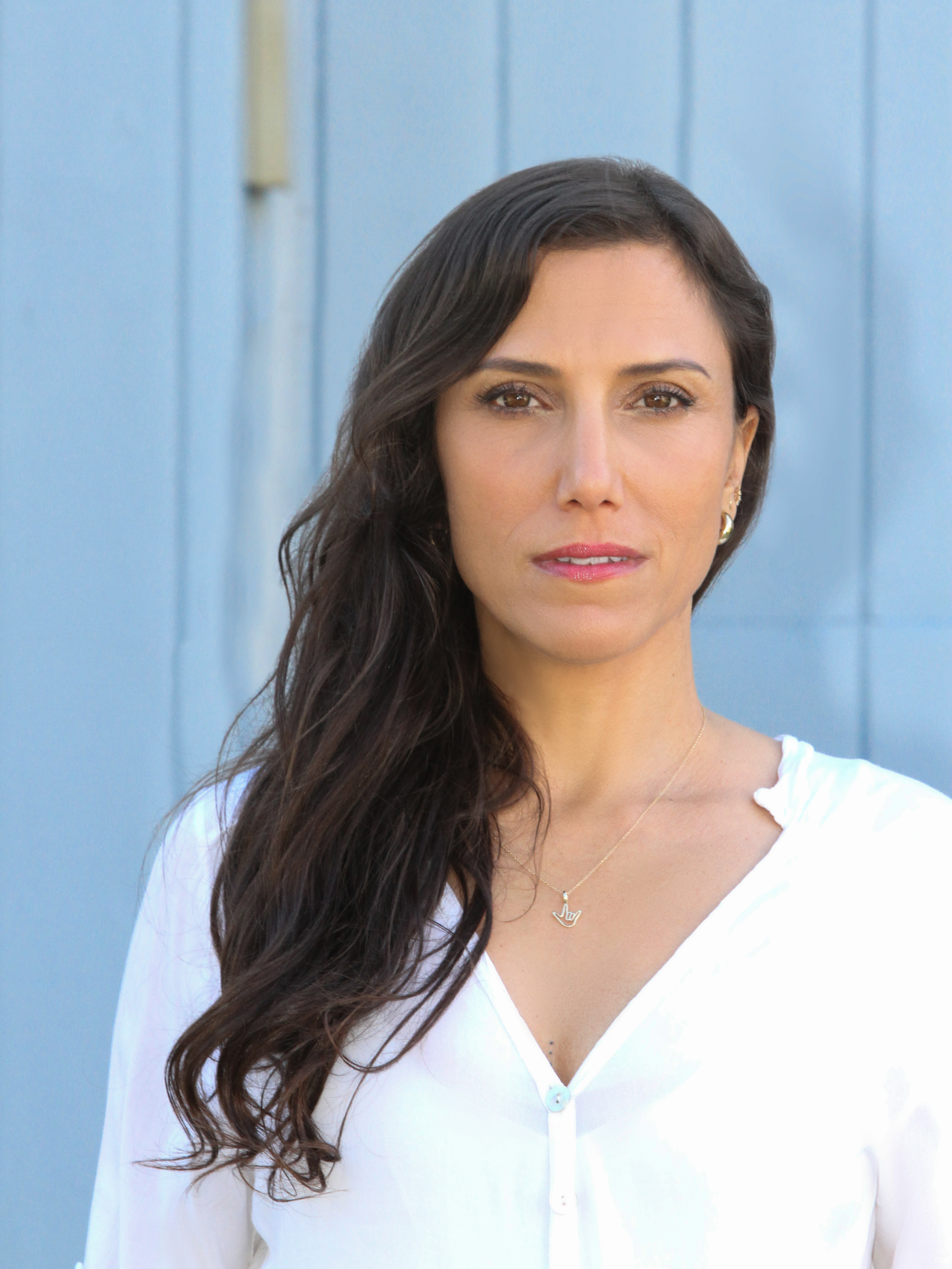
- Born: November 9, 1978 (age 48); Bern, Switzerland
- Occupation: Actress
- Years active: 2006–present

Kadia Saraf is a Swiss-Israeli actress. She is best known for playing Detective Claudette Wallace in the crime drama mystery series Dexter: Resurrection and U.S. Attorney Anya Avital in the crime drama series Law & Order: Special Victims Unit.

== Early life ==
Saraf was born in Bern, Switzerland to a Yemeni-Israeli father and a Swiss mother. She moved to Northern Israel at the age of four and remained there for ten years, before moving back to Switzerland at age fourteen. She got a degree in structural engineering from BBM in Kreuzlingen. She then moved to Tel Aviv where she served as an ambulance driver at Magen David Adom, Israel's national medical emergency service.

Saraf has trained in Kenpo Jitsu. She won the Israeli National Championship title in 2001.

In 2004, Saraf moved to New York where she started her acting career. She is fluent in English, Hebrew, German, and Swiss German, and also speaks some French and Arabic. She has been studying American Sign Language.

== Career ==
Saraf made her on screen debut in an episode of the comedy drama series Rescue Me. She was never on a TV set prior to appearing on this show. She has made guest appearances in the police procedural shows Blue Bloods and FBI: International. In 2021, Saraf was cast in a recurring role as U.S. Attorney Anya Avital in the crime drama series Law & Order: Special Victims Unit and its spinoff Law & Order: Organized Crime.

She currently stars as Detective Claudette Wallace in Dexter: Resurrection.

== Personal life ==
Saraf has three children. She is married to Terry Serpico who she met on the set of SVU. She is an advocate for the deaf community.

== Filmography ==
=== Film ===
Year	Title	Role	Notes
2013	The Reel Life	Charli Quinn	Short
2013	Hiraeth	Meredith	Short
2018	First We Take Brooklyn	Sarit	

=== Television ===
Year	Title	Role	Notes
2006	Rescue Me	Jill	Episode; Discovery
2015	Blindspot	Hostage 2	Episode; Split the Law
2017	Madam Secretary	Interviewer	Episode; The Beautiful Game
2017	The Blacklist	Maya Elazar	Episode; The Kilgannon Corporation (No. 48)
2018	Counterpart	Woman	Episode; The Lost Art of Diplomacy
2020	The Good Fight	Talia Aaronson	Episode; The Gang Deals with Alternate Reality
2022	FBI: International	Legat Erin Padilla	Episode; Left of Boom
2023	Blue Bloods	Regina	Episode; Past History
2021-2023	Law & Order: Special Victims Unit	US Attorney Anya Avital	7 episodes
2023	Law & Order: Organized Crime	US Attorney Anya Avital	Episode; With Many Names
2025	The Better Sister	Chief PM	Episode; She's My Sister
2025–present	Dexter: Resurrection	Detective Claudette Wallace	10 episodes
2026	FBI	Grace Lattimore	Episode; Fidelity
