= Hilly Hicks Jr. =

American playwright and screenwriter (born 1970)

- Born: Hilly Gene Hicks Jr. May 11, 1970 (age 56); Los Angeles, California United States
- Education: New York University's Tisch School of the Arts and Columbia University Graduate School of the Arts and Sciences
- Occupations: Playwright, screenwriter
- Parents: Hilly Hicks (father); Greta Johnson Mandell (mother)

Hilly Hicks Jr. (born May 11, 1970) is an American playwright and screenwriter.

== Life and career ==
Hicks was born on May 11, 1970, in Los Angeles, California. His father is actor Hilly Hicks and his mother is psychiatrist Greta Johnson Mandell.

Hicks graduated from John Muir High School in Pasadena, California, after which he attended Occidental College in Los Angeles before transferring to New York University to pursue his creative interests. Hicks graduated from New York University's Tisch School of the Arts and the Columbia University Graduate School of Arts and Sciences.

Hicks is the author of the children's play The Breeze, the Gust, the Gale, and the Wind, which was commissioned and produced by La Jolla Playhouse, and How to Unload a Dishwasher, which was commissioned and produced in Los Angeles by the Echo Theatre Company. His play Artists & Criminals was commissioned by South Coast Repertory and workshopped at the Mark Taper Forum. His play A Hole in the Dark was presented in Manhattan Theatre Club's reading series 6@6: Discovering the Next Generation, and was workshopped at the Lark Theatre Company in New York City. He was thought to be a very funny person and enjoyable. A Hole in the Dark was subsequently produced at the Horizon Theatre Company in Atlanta, at City Theatre in Pittsburgh, and The Blank Theater in Los Angeles. His play The Home Life of Polar Bears was developed at New York Theatre Workshop and the O'Neill National Playwrights Conference. It was further workshopped in the New Works Festival at the Mark Taper Forum in Los Angeles and at Seattle Repertory Theatre. It was presented in the international exchange program at the Royal Court Theatre in London. His short play Note To Self was presented in the 2001 Humana Festival of New American Plays at the Actors Theatre of Louisville. He is also the co-author of Uncle Sam's Satiric Spectacular, which was produced in the 2005 Humana Festival. Hicks's other plays include The Trophy Room and Self-Portrait. His newest play is The Tallest Girl in the Class, which was commissioned by City Theatre in Pittsburgh and developed in residence at the Sundance Theatre Institute's playwrights retreat at the Ucross Foundation.

Hicks is the recipient of the Berilla Kerr Foundation Award for playwriting, a Backstage Garland Award for Best Play and a Van Lier Playwriting Fellowship from New York Theatre Workshop. In addition to City Theatre, South Coast Repertory and La Jolla Playhouse, he has been commissioned by Manhattan Theatre Club and the Atlantic Theater Company. His plays have been published by Dramatists Play Service and Playscripts, Inc.

For television, he was a staff writer for the prime time Fox series Pasadena with Dana Delany, the NBC drama Kidnapped and the Lifetime series Army Wives. He was a co-writer of the Discovery Channel special Beyond Tomorrow. He was a writer on the Showtime series The Big C starring Laura Linney. From there, he went on to write for Chicago Fire (NBC), Feed The Beast (AMC), Sacred Lies (Facebook Watch), and Truth Be Told (Apple TV+). He is currently an executive producer on Dexter: Resurrection for Paramount+ with Showtime.

== List of plays ==
- Heaven and Hell (On Earth): A Divine Comedy
- A Hole in the Dark
- The Home Life of Polar Bears
- Note to Self
- The Trophy Room
- Uncle Sam's Satiric Spectacular

== List of TV credits ==
- Dexter: Resurrection (Paramount+ with Showtime) – Executive Producer (2025–present)
- Truth Be Told (Apple TV+) – Co-Executive Producer (2020–2021)
- Sacred Lies (Facebook Watch) – Co-Executive Producer (2019–2020)
- Jessica Jones (Netflix) – Executive Producer, Co-EP, Supervising Producer (2015–2019)
- Feed the Beast (AMC) – Supervising Producer (2015–2016)
- Chicago Fire (NBC) – Supervising Producer, Producer (2012–2014)
- The Big C (Showtime) – Co-Producer, Exec Story Editor, Story Editor (2009–2012)
- Army Wives (Lifetime) – Story Editor (2006–2007)
- Kidnapped (NBC) – Staff Writer (2006–2007)
- Pasadena (Fox) – Staff Writer (2001–2002)
