= Angel Batista =

Fictional character

- Dexter character
- David Zayas as Angel Batista
- First appearance: Novels: Darkly Dreaming Dexter (2004); Television: "Dexter" (2006)
- Last appearance: Novels: Dexter Is Dead (2015)
- Created by: Jeff Lindsay
- Portrayed by: David Zayas (Dexter, New Blood); James Martinez (young; Original Sin)

In-universe information
- Full name: Angelo Juan Marcos Batista
- Gender: Male
- Occupation: Homicide Detective (seasons 1–3); Homicide Sergeant (seasons 3–7); Homicide Lieutenant (season 8); Homicide Captain (New Blood)
- Family: Jamie Batista (sister)
- Spouses: Nina Batista (ex-wife); María LaGuerta (ex-wife; deceased)
- Children: Auri Batista
- Nationality: American

Angelo "Angel" Juan Marcos Batista (/ˈeɪndʒəl/; Spanish [ˈaŋxel]) is a fictional character in the Showtime television series Dexter and the novels by Jeff Lindsay upon which it is based. He is portrayed in the television series by David Zayas (Dexter, New Blood, and Resurrection), and as the younger version of Batista by James Martinez (Original Sin). Batista spends much of the original series as a sergeant before being promoted to lieutenant in the final season.

== Character biography ==
Angelo "Angel" Juan Marcos Batista is a detective in Miami Metro Police Department's Homicide Division. He works closely with Dexter Morgan (Michael C. Hall) during cases, often teaming up with him for his expert advice on serial killers — unaware that he is one. He also functions as friend and mentor to Detective Debra Morgan (Jennifer Carpenter), Dexter's foster sister.

Angel is portrayed as a friendly and good-natured man who brings a sense of humanity and compassion to the show. Despite his tendency to act impulsively and make decisions based on emotions, Angel does not hold grudges, even when faced with difficult circumstances. Rather, he is depicted as having a deep sense of care for his social environment, particularly his colleagues. Angel is also notable for his signature trilby hat, which he is rarely seen without. Being a divorced and lonely police officer, he views himself as a cliché.

=== Season one ===
When Angel arrives on the scene of a foot chase called in by James Doakes (Erik King), he finds the suspect dead. When first questioned by Internal Affairs, Batista lies for Doakes, saying the other man shot first. However, he later tells the truth, saying that he made a promise to his father that he would always be an honest man. When Batista cheats on his wife, he tells his wife about the indiscretion, which leads to their separation (something he tries to keep hidden from everyone).

One night at a club, Batista sees a woman with a prosthetic hand, the nails painted in the same manner as the victims of the Ice Truck Killer, a serial killer who preys on prostitutes. He investigates and finds out that the woman had a customer with an amputee fetish. In an attempt to chase the lead, he talks with prosthetic technician Rudy Cooper (Christian Camargo) about patients he may have that have the same fetish. Cooper, who is none other than the Ice Truck Killer, then stabs Batista. While recovering, Batista agrees to a divorce with his wife. He also helps to uncover Cooper's true identity by asking for Cooper's prints to be compared to mental institution files.

After three months of being on his own, Batista turns to spiritual enlightenment to lessen his pain. He claims to be Dexter's best friend, much to Dexter's confusion, as he has never given Batista any reason to think so. However, Dexter eventually admits that Batista is the closest thing he has ever had to a real friend.

=== Season two ===
In season two, Batista and the rest of the department try their best to alleviate the grief from families of the Bay Harbor Butcher victims. He becomes especially involved in one case of a suspected murderer named Oscar Sota. When he talks to Sota's widow (Bertila Damas) in his office, he ends up having a heated and frustrating argument with her about what her husband was actually doing to be targeted by the Butcher. Feeling guilty, he goes to her house and offers her a sincere apology. She begins to trust Batista, and offers him more details on the case.

Batista is incensed that he and his colleagues are being investigated, and disappointed when Dexter does not show objections to Lundy. Batista reluctantly agrees to help Debra investigate the Rodgrio case, and the two meet with Lenny Asher (Bruce Weitz) to see if his notes can help their investigation, and discover Rodrigo’s killer was using a seized car only accessible to members of the Miami Metro Police Department. He eventually takes an interest in Dexter's on-off lover Lila Tournay (Jaime Murray), and asks her out after she and Dexter break up. Unbeknownst to Batista, however, Lila is only using him to get close to Dexter. To that end, she takes Rohypnol after having rough sex with Batista, and then accuses him of date rape. Batista is terrified of being convicted, as it will ruin his career and his life. After Dexter kills Lila, the charges are dropped, much to Batista's relief. During an awkward but heartfelt conversation, Dexter tells Batista that if he were "normal," he would want to be a man like him.

=== Season three ===
Batista is promoted to Sergeant. After Dexter kills Oscar Prado in self-defense, Batista puts Debra on the case, the police suspecting Frederick “Freebo” Bowman of committing the crime. After Debra badmouths Oscar in front of his brother Miguel, LaGuerta urges Batista to remove her from the case, and he reluctantly agrees. Batista and Quinn visit Zack Adelman for information on Freebo, and bust him for doing drugs. Batista congratulates Dexter on Rita’s pregnancy. After another victim is found, Batista suspects Freebo of being the perpetrator and instructs Debra to mend fences with confidential informant Anton Briggs. Batista risks his career to get a hooker who turns out to be an undercover cop. When the officer, Barbara Gianna (Kristin Dattilo), confronts him, she is convinced to not reveal his indiscretion after he truthfully tells her of the toll being a divorced cop has been having on him. Batista tracks down Barbara to ask her out, and she tells him she does not normally date. He secretly authorizes Debra to follow Ramon Prado on her suspicion that he is the Skinner, and turns down a hooker that Barbara planted, leading her to agree to go on a date with him.

Barbara initially does not want to form a relationship with Batista, who relents and tells her that he just wants to spend time with her. She then kisses him to signify her interest in him. Joey Quinn (Desmond Harrington) warns Batista that Barbara will have expectations of him now that they are involved, and Batista begins acting irrationally, leaving her a long-winded message begging forgiveness for having to cancel dinner because of work. However, Barbara finds this funny, brings him a take-out dinner, and their relationship appears strong. Batista, Masuka, and Dexter go to a cemetery where they find the body of Ellen Wolf, and Batista attempts to prevent LaGuerta from seeing it. Batista chasties Masuka for making a big deal out of Dexter’s bachelor party while two investigations are going on. Batista goes to visit Barbara after she is attacked, and he enlists Dexter to test one of her keys. Before giving the results to Batista, Dexter warns him against getting violent with the man who hurt her, and Batista takes his advice by just arresting him. Batista attends Dexter’s bachelor party and helps Masuka uncover the past of the woman he slept with. He attends Dexter's wedding with Barbara as his date.

=== Season four ===
By the start of season four, it appears that Batista and Barbara have amicably split, and he is now romantically involved with his Lieutenant, Maria LaGuerta (Lauren Vélez). Neither wishes for their relationship to become public, in fear of losing their jobs and "defining something indefinable". He looks to Dexter for advice, and he then becomes an involuntary counselor between the two. After Lundy is killed and Debra is shot, Batista orders Dexter to leave for his own sake and leaks a story to reporter Christine Hill (Courtney Ford) that Vacation Murder suspect Johnny Rose has STD with the intent of luring Nikki out. Matthews disapproves of Batista and LaGuerta's relationship as he believes it will cause conflicts on trials and is willing to promote Batista provided that he is transferred out of the Homicide unit. After LaGuerta tries getting transferred in Batista's place, the pair tell Matthews that they have ended their relationship, and he warns them they will lose their careers if they are found to have lied.

Batista takes over the Lundy shooting case, pledging to Debra that he is going to find her shooter. During Thanksgiving, Batista and LaGuerta visit a comatose widower after DNA testing catches his wife's killer ten years after the murder. Batista, admitting to being fearful of either dying or being put in a comatose state, tells LaGuerta that he loves her. She reluctantly acknowledges feeling the same way about him. Debra, suspecting Christine of having shot her, gets Batista to watch their interview and he notices she struggles to look at images of Lundy's crime scene. After a DNA test confirms Christine's relation to Trinity, Batista, Quinn, and Debra take her into custody. Batista interrogates Christine. Through a recording of Batista and LaGuerta kissing, Matthews discovers the pair lied under oath and tells them they will face legal consequences. Batista and LaGuerta secretly get married with Dexter as witness, and use their new marriage to dissuade Matthews from going after them in front of the Board of Review. After Christine commits suicide in front of Debra, Batista orders her to take a personal day. He agrees to move in to LaGuerta's home.

=== Season five ===
Batista supports investigating Rita's murder, but is overruled by LaGuerta. She opens up to Batista at the funeral, and he consoles her. Batista discovers that LaGuerta has over $200,000 in a savings account, and tries getting advice from Quinn and Debra on how to handle the situation, to undesired results. Batista and Masuka go for drinks and a drunk Batista assaults a drunk police officer after he makes sexual remarks about LaGuerta ("she gave the best blowjobs in Miami"). Batista initially tries to play down the altercation, but after Masuka makes a comment, he admits to LaGuerta what happened, and LaGuerta learns from Jim McCourt (Raphael Sbarge) that Batista is being investigated by Internal Affairs. Batista apologizes to the officer he assaulted during the latter's hospitalization, and goes with a unit to find the primary suspect in the Santa Muerte cult murders, Carlos Fuentes (Joseph Julian Soria). LaGuerta teams up with McCourt, but that prompts Batista to be even more jealous; he starts checking her cell phone for suspicious messages and finds a rendezvous appointment in a hotel room. Outraged, he walks in on them, only to find out that it was intended to be a sting operation to apprehend a corrupt narcotics cop, in which LaGuerta agreed to participate to bail Batista out of the investigation. Batista and LaGuerta argue over whether she helped to get the charges dropped against him because she was looking out for herself and not him. Batista and Debra stake out the Club Mayan while trying to find the Fuentes brothers, Batista noticing a woman, Yasmin Aragon (Jessica Camacho), and bringing her over to help them target the Fuentes brothers in exchange for dropping her drug charges. Batista and LaGuerta apologize to each other.

Miami Metro investigates a truck accident where five barrels with dead women inside are discovered. Batista interrogates the truck’s owner, motivational speaker Jordan Chase (Jonny Lee Miller) and his security guard, Cole Harmon (Chris Vance). The Club Mayan operation results in Yasmin’s death as well as one of the Fuentes brothers and another civilian. Batista tries to console LaGuerta, but she refuses to take responsibility in spite of everyone following her orders. Batista is undecided on how to proceed. LaGuerta pins the blame on Debra, and Batista confronts her privately, telling her that he will back her no matter what because she is flesh and blood to him. After Debra finds new evidence in the Barrel Girls case, Batista mentions to LaGuerta that they should reopen the case and disagrees with her when she claims Debra is using the case to get back at her. After LaGuerta decides to reopen the case, and urges Batista to stop sleeping on the couch, Batista admits the pair have a ways to go to rebuilding their relationship. Ever since, Batista's approach towards LaGuerta's bossiness has drastically changed, as he has been "cutting her off" every time she seems to try to overpower his decision. However, in the season finale they seem to have set their relationship back on track.

=== Season six ===
Batista has moved in with his younger sister Jamie (Aimee Garcia) in the apartment adjacent to Dexter's, thus allowing Jamie to babysit Dexter's son Harrison whenever Dexter might need to leave in the middle of the night. It turns out that he and LaGuerta separated in order for her to secure the position of Captain in Miami Metro Homicide. However, her position as Lieutenant was left open specifically for him by her recommendation. To her surprise, Deputy Chief Tom Matthews (Geoff Pierson) decided to promote Debra to Lieutenant instead. Debra breaks this news to Batista, who takes it in stride and congratulates her, but is still hurt by constantly being involved in LaGuerta's battles with Matthews. Detective Joey Quinn (Desmond Harrington) also begins criticizing Batista for not telling LaGuerta how he feels. Batista advises Debra against letting LaGuerta boss her around. After Miami Metro discovers a new serial killer, and Gellar (Edward James Olmos) is named as the prime suspect, Batista and Quinn travel to meet with Gellar's former assistant Carissa Porter (Mariana Klaveno). Batista tries unsuccessfully to get Quinn to not sleep with her, and discovers one of Gellar's old drawings which bears a resemblance to Erin's corpse. Quinn convinces Batista to lie to Deb about the former's romantic involvement with Carissa, and Batista interrogates her by himself until Deb orders Quinn to join in. After Carissa mentions her and Quinn's hookup, Batista apologizes to Debra at her house-warming party, where he also punches out a drunk Quinn for making crude remarks about Jamie.

Batista and Debra talk with Holly after she escapes from captivity. When Jamie starts dating forensics intern Louis Greene (Josh Cooke), Batista makes a failed attempt to scare him away during a dinner with both of them. After Quinn does not show up to work, Batista discovers that he had one-night stands and goes with him to retrieve his lost gun. After Batista's car breaks down, Quinn mocks Batista for his two failed marriages and his relationships with his daughter and sister, leading to a fight. Louis tracks down the address of Steve Dorsey (Kyle Davis), who posts videos online of his support for Gellar. Batista, unable to locate Quinn, goes to the address and talks with Steve's wife Beth (Jordana Spiro). He notices a shelf devoted to Gellar's works, and is knocked unconscious by serial killer Travis Marshall (Colin Hanks). Marshall gives Beth Batista's ID to get access into the Miami Metro headquarters so she can deliver poison, and keeps Batista alive in case they run into issues. As Marshall prepares to shoot Batista, Quinn arrives. Though Batista is thankful for being rescued, he tells Quinn he cannot have a partner he cannot trust. Batista later tries to get Quinn transferred, but the latter says that he told his union rep of his drinking problem and was told in turn that he could not be fired or transferred as long as he seeks help.

=== Season seven ===
After Detective Mike Anderson (Billy Brown) is murdered, and the body of prostitute is found in the trunk of his killer, Batista and Quinn go to the Foxhole, where they reconcile. The club's owner George Novikov (Jason Gedrick) claims no one knows anything about Kaja's murder. Following Wayne Randall's suicide, Batista and Dexter go to question Randall's ex-girlfriend and partner-in-crime, Hannah McKay (Yvonne Strahovski). Batista tells Dexter that he has started to have thoughts of retiring since Mike's murder. After paroled killer Ray Speltzer (Matt Gerald) is arrested, the police need to get a confession due to a lack of evidence. Batista talks to him before Debra, and later restrains her when she tries attacking Speltzer after he shows up at one of his victim's funerals. Batista is doubtful that a recently-deceased bartender killed Mike, but agrees to drop the case upon Debra's request. When Batista goes to a restaurant with Jamie, he expresses interest in buying it, and she warns him against doing anything impulsive. Batista later tells Debra that he is burnt out and that thinking about the restaurant is the only thing that makes him happy.

He initially has trouble finding the money and dealing with the paperwork, but his problems are solved when Quinn gives him a great deal of money for a down payment; he does not tell Batista that the money was laundered by the Russian Mafia. Batista defines the money as a loan and promises to pay him back. He announces his ownership of the restaurant and invites his coworkers to eat there, later running into problems with the health inspector. Batista learns that Dexter and Hannah are dating from Jamie. Batista and Quinn go to the Foxhole after learning that George is sending Nadia (Katia Winter) to Dubai, where Batista is doubtful of Quinn's story after he kills George and stages it as self-defense. Per Debra's request, Batista agrees to keep quiet about her investigation of Hannah. He tells Dexter after Debra's car accident, leading to Dexter discovering Hannah poisoned her. In the season finale, Batista defends Dexter after LaGuerta arrests him and accuses him of being the real Bay Harbor Butcher. He urges LaGuerta to drop her investigation, and has his retirement party at the restaurant on New Year's Eve.

=== Season eight ===
In season eight, Batista chooses to continue running the restaurant while also returning to Miami Metro. He is promoted to Lieutenant of Homicide after Debra leaves Miami Metro. He holds a dedication ceremony for LaGuerta, who was killed in the season 7 finale, and gives a reluctant Dexter a vase she kept in her old office.

Quinn is now dating Jamie, and Batista pressures him to take the sergeant's exam to prove that he is serious about the relationship and his future. Quinn does well on the exam, but Batista ultimately chooses another candidate after being pressured by Matthews.

In "Monkey in a Box", Batista reinstates Debra as a detective, unaware that she killed LaGuerta. In the series finale, "Remember the Monsters?", however, Debra is shot by serial killer Oliver Saxon (Darri Ingolfsson) and falls into a persistent vegetative state. When Quinn attacks Saxon in the interrogation room, Batista does nothing to stop him, and threatens Saxon with the electric chair unless he confesses. Dexter later kills Saxon in full view of a security camera, but Batista accepts his claim of self-defense and lets him go. It is suggested that both Batista and Quinn know the truth, but turn a blind eye because they wanted to kill Saxon themselves. Batista is last seen receiving the news about Dexter's apparent death; unbeknownst to him, Dexter staged his death and is living under another identity.

=== Dexter: New Blood ===
In "Runaway", it is revealed that between the end of the original series and New Blood that Batista has been promoted to the Captain of Homicide of the Miami Metro Police Department. He attends a conference in New York City attended by Iron Lake Police Department Chief Angela Bishop (Julia Jones). Batista tells Angela about Dexter Morgan and his son, Harrison – unaware that Angela's boyfriend, "Jim Lindsay", is in fact Dexter living under another identity, and that she has met Harrison. Batista's story makes Angela suspicious, and ultimately leads to her discovering her boyfriend's true identity.

In the series finale, "Sins of the Father", Batista is contacted by Bishop, who suspects Dexter of being the Bay Harbor Butcher, and sends him a picture of her and Morgan together dated a month prior. Batista realizes that Dexter is alive and heads to Iron Lake with LaGuerta's old files on the Butcher case. His arrival in the town is never shown, as the show ends before he gets there.

=== Dexter: Resurrection ===
As Dexter recovers from his near-fatal shooting and a ten week coma, Batista visits him in the hospital and the two are reunited for the first time in 10 years. Batista reveals that the next day after the shooting Angela had recanted her allegations, ultimately clearing Dexter of the murders that he was accused of in Iron Lake. Although glad that Dexter is still alive, Batista is now suspicious that his former friend really is the Bay Harbor Butcher. Batista has Dexter legally declared alive again and searches for him after Dexter flees from the hospital upon learning that his son Harrison (Jack Alcott) had committed a murder in New York City with Dexter's MO. Batista tracks down the car Dexter stole and learns it was sold by Harrison, now a hotel employee. Batista reunites with him and after learning that Harrison does not know Dexter survived, and pretends Dexter is deceased to get him to reveal whether he was the Bay Harbor Butcher. Harrison's coworker Elsa (Emilia Suárez) unintentionally reveals to Batista there was a murder at the hotel, the killing of serial rapist Ryan Foster, and Batista visits the New York City Police Department (NYPD) to assist Detective Claudette Wallace (Kadia Saraf). Batista meets with Harrison again and makes clear his suspicion that Harrison killed Ryan. Harrison brushes him off, and Batista expresses his hope that he does not become like his father.

After serial killer Mia LaPierre (Krysten Ritter) is arrested for Foster's murder, Batista expresses doubts of her guilt to Wallace and her partner Melvin Oliva (Dominic Fumusa), and Wallace approves his request to come with them to their interrogation of Mia, where he plans to show her a picture of Dexter and see if she recognizes him. When the three arrive at her prison, an alarm goes off, and a deceased Mia is found hanging in her cell. Batista is unconvinced that Mia took her own life, and gets access to DMV records, allowing him to find Dexter's residence and meet his neighbor Blessing (Ntare Mwine). Dexter returns to Batista being friendly with Blessing and the latter's family, and offers Batista a ride home. He threatens him to never come around his family, son, or himself again, and forces Batista out of the car, unaware that Batista has placed his AirPods in the car to use as a GPS tracker.

Batista tracks Dexter to a wig shop, the latter using it as a kill room to intimidate Elsa's landlord Vinny Valenta (Steve Schirripa) into treating his tenants better. After hearing Batista coming, Dexter frees Valenta, and the latter rushes past Batista, who calls Wallace and Olivia. With a lack of evidence, Wallace and Olivia begin to doubt his theories. Wallace learns from an unaware Joey Quinn that Batista had abruptly retired before traveling to New York and thus was acting outside of the law.

His credibility destroyed, Batista tries to warn Wallace, but Dexter's latest nemesis Leon Prater (Peter Dinklage) kidnaps him and straps to Brian Moser's kill table to become Dexter's next victim. Although Dexter considers killing Batista due to the threat he poses, Dexter chooses to cut him loose in the hopes of them working together one last time. In a rage, Batista attacks and chokes Dexter, only to be fatally shot by Prater. Unable to help Batista, Dexter admits to his former friend that he is the Bay Harbor Butcher, but swears that he did not kill LaGuerta and Doakes. Batista replies that their deaths, and his, are Dexter's fault, and with his last words, curses his name. Dexter uses Batista's phone to escape Prater's vault. After Dexter activates the alarm, the police find Batista's body and conclude that Prater murdered him.

A few years later, Dexter remains haunted by Batista's death and has dreams of hunting the New York Ripper together ending with the Ripper turning into Batista on the kill table and repeating the real Batista's last words. Dexter admits that he wishes that things could've turned out differently between them and that Batista could've accepted him for who he is. When Dexter falls asleep at the wheel, he dreams of Batista again who calls Dexter no hero and asks how people are supposed to know that Dexter killed Rapunzel.

== Casting and characterization ==
Zayas auditioned for Dexter and immediately took a liking to the script, reflecting that it "was brilliant. I didn’t know how it would be received, but I wanted to be part of it. I thought it was an exciting concept." Zayas added that it was rare in television to see Latino characters in positions such as detective, lieutenant, or district attorney and said he was "very proud of the fact that I was part of a show that maintained the diversity of ethnicity, because it just wasn’t Latinos, Masuka was Japanese-American, and we had many African-American characters. It was multi-ethnic and that was an important aspect for me."

In a 2009 interview, Zayas said the fourth season would continue Batista's "journey for a successful relationship" and that his promotion to sergeant would include new investigations.

Batista appears in two episodes of New Blood. Zayas reflected on not having a problem with the ending of the original series because he believed there was a chance the series could continue, but gave up after the first few years following its conclusion until Clyde Phillips called and requested his participation, Zayas being "extremely happy that I was asked to be a part of this reboot, even if it's in a small capacity."

In January 2025, David Zayas was confirmed as series regular in Dexter: Resurrection, reprising his role as Angel Batista. Zayas said that he did not consider Batista an enemy to Dexter as he did not fit the code and that Batista did not know "how to proceed, other than confronting Dexter, getting information, and figuring out what to do with it." Zayas furthered that Batista "doesn't have the same jurisdiction or authority to handle this in a straightforward, law enforcement way" which would lead to him maneuvering around it and that he viewed the character as "a whole new Batista" that was darker, angrier, upset, and possibly even embarrassed. Matt Fowler writes that Resurrection makes Batista the first character in the franchise's history trying to catch Dexter that the audience would "actually root for" given how close they were in the original series and his need for "a lot of answers regarding the loss of his friends and loved ones. He seeks justice for characters we actually knew and cared about." Fowler notes the addition of Detective Wallace, a new character without the same ties, "allows Batista, in a nice, full-circle way, to become the unexpected hero of Resurrection." Carissa Pavlica writes that Batista arrives to see Dexter in the premiere carrying both the weight of the suspicions of past characters and their lack of proof and that the visit "allows Dexter just enough breathing room to slip through another trap, but it's clear the net is tightening."

Zayas said that as the first season of Resurrection progresses, Batista's innocence "has been chipped away by the truth that he just popped into", and that he has to contend with the problem "where he doesn’t really have the authority in New York to follow through. He’s got to hope that he convinces the authorities to do something." Zayas furthers that Batista is unaware of Dexter's code, instead viewing things "from a completely different law enforcement kind of view" and that the character "has backed up Dexter many, many times. But to find out now who he truly is, I don't think Batista can let it go. At least not within the character that they've written for me for the past 20 years." Batista's death is depicted in the episode "Touched by an Ángel". Zayas was informed of his character's death since the beginning of the season. "We approached it from the beginning, full-heartedly and trying to do the best work we could, and telling the story as best as we could." He added, "I think that with the circumstances these great writers wrote for Dexter: Resurrection, with the momentum of where Batista [was] going — to try and get justice from Dexter — I think it's the right way to tell the story." Regarding Angel's dying words, Zayas said, "To be honest, the first time I read the script, I said, 'I don't know if I want to say this.' But then I realized this has to be it. It's not necessarily just about you. It's about progressing the story of Dexter: Resurrection, and what comes next for Dexter." He added, "The one thing I love about the character of Angel Batista is he kept it real to the end. He didn't say, "Oh, it's okay." No, he kept it real till the end. "This is why I'm here. I gave it my best shot. But you know what? Fuck you." Nevertheless, he suggested he was not opposed to returning in some capacity, adding "never say never."

In June 2024, James Martinez was cast as Batista in the prequel Dexter: Original Sin. Martinez had been a fan of David Zayas' theater work and noted the latter actor's similarities to his Dexter character, which made it to where "when you talk to him and you get to know him, you really get who Angel is at his core and that to me was the most important part." Martinez remembered Zayas telling him that Batista did not "have a cynical bone in his body" and was generally optimistic.

== Reception ==
Batista is one of the most popular Dexter characters, coming in #5 in a list by WhatCulture.

Batista's relationship with LaGuerta was met with mixed responses, with some finding their romance forced. Emily St. James said the twist of Batista and LaGuerta being in a relationship "would be more of a shock were either of these characters developed beyond a stock series of character traits." Comic Book Resources noted their compatibility as a couple in an entry on the best duos in the Dexter series while TV Fanatic wrote their relationship was "not an office romance that’s funny, original or particularly interesting." Batista's role in the latter part of the series is also criticized, with Joshua Alston writing that he could not "remember a single thing Batista and Quinn did" in the sixth season, and Joseph Kratzer of WhatCulture wrote that Batista had "been even more useless and underutilized than Quinn".

Matt Fowler called Batista's brief return in New Blood a delight while Nick Harley mocked the character as "perhaps the worst detective in the history of television." Some commentators felt the lack of a reunion between Dexter and Batista before the last episode's conclusion was a missed opportunity.

Batista's return in Dexter: Resurrection was met with praise, but also concerns that he would be killed off. Carissa Pavlica called the character's murder "the end of an era", as Batista was the last living tie to characters from the original series and that with his departure, viewers were now just as isolated as Dexter. Samantha Barker wrote that Batista's death "solidified the trope that Dexter never kills the people closest to him, but he inadvertently gets them killed."

== Differences from the novels ==
In the book series, Angel Batista habitually introduces himself as "no relation" (to Cuban former dictator Fulgencio Batista), and as a result is nicknamed "Angel-no-relation" by Dexter. He also plays a less prominent role in the novels than in the television series, and is a forensic scientist rather than a homicide detective.
