= Jack Alcott =

American actor (born 1996)

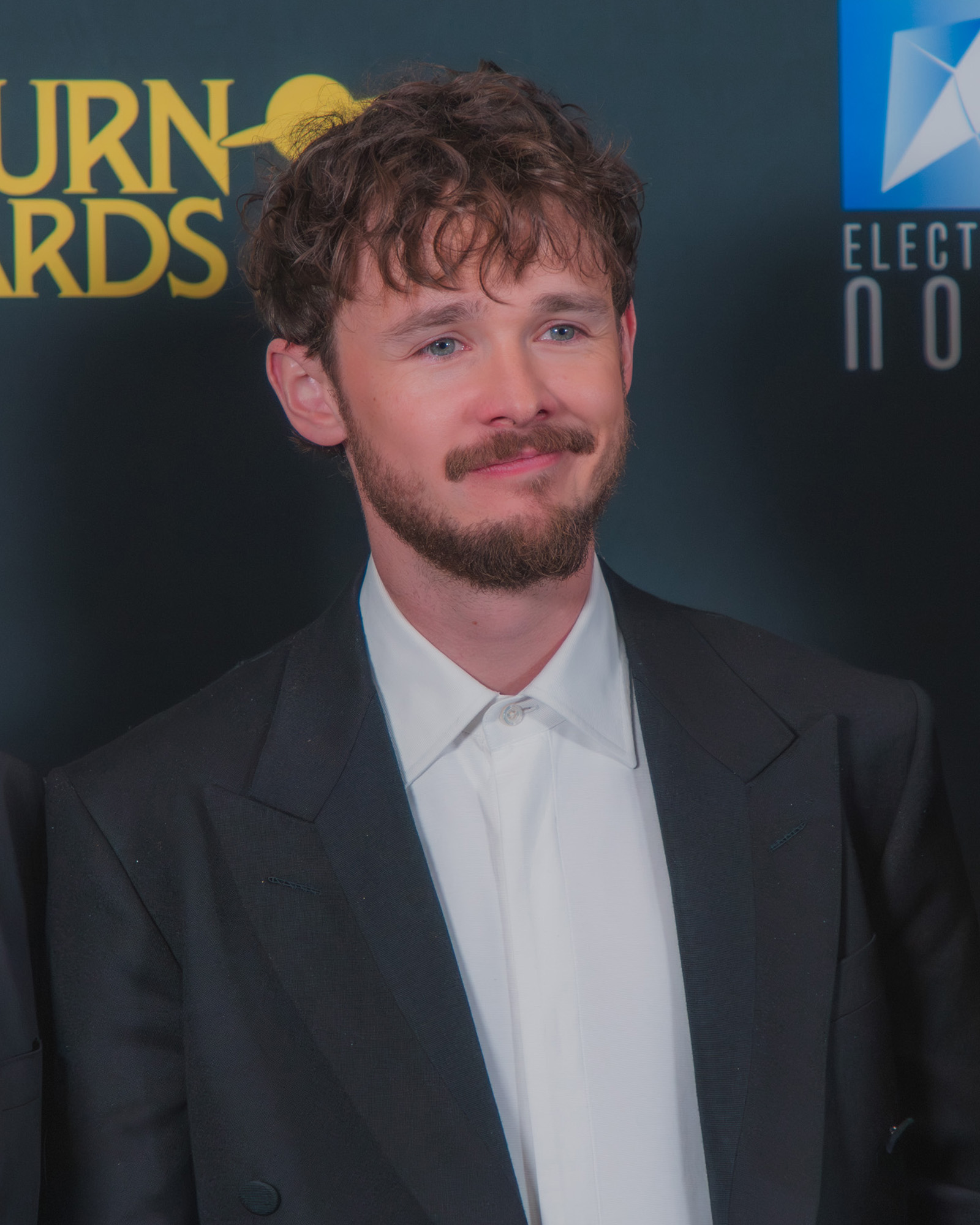
- Alcott in 2026
- Born: October 24, 1996 (age 30); Nashville, Tennessee, U.S.
- Education: University of North Carolina School of the Arts
- Occupation: Actor
- Years active: 2014–present

Jack Alcott (born October 24, 1996) (Note: Sources list his birth year as 1996, but contradict each other about the month and day of birth.) is an American actor. He is known for his roles on the Showtime miniseries The Good Lord Bird (2020) and as Harrison Morgan on Dexter: New Blood (2021–22) and Dexter: Resurrection (2025–present).

== Early life and education ==
Alcott grew up in Franklin, Tennessee. He studied drama at the University of North Carolina School of the Arts, graduating with the drama class of 2019. In a 2022 interview, Alcott described spending time in New York City early in his career before moving back home during the COVID-19 pandemic.

== Career ==
Alcott appeared in several short films before earning his first television role as Young Zach Chevalier on Champaign ILL (2018). In 2020, he portrayed a young Donald Ressler in The Blacklist episode "Brothers".

Alcott received his first regular role as Jason Brown on The Good Lord Bird (2020). He then starred as Harrison Morgan, the teenage son of Dexter Morgan, in Dexter: New Blood (2021–2022). In 2023, Alcott guest-starred on the Peacock series Poker Face in the episode "The Future of the Sport" as Randy.

In 2025, Alcott reprised Harrison Morgan as a series regular in Dexter: Resurrection. That same year, he appeared in the American Western Film, Killing Faith, as Edward Yacht, a helper to Sarah, played by DeWanda Wise. The film was directed by Ned Crowley and also stars Guy Pearce and Bill Pullman.

== Personal life ==
Alcott married actress Izabela Vidovic on October 12, 2025.

== Filmography ==
=== Television ===
Year	Title	Role	Notes
2018	Champaign ILL	Young Zach Chevalier	Episode: "I Wouldn't Sh'ma Just Yet"
2020	When the Streetlights Go On	Jamie	Episode: "2016 Pilot"
2020	The Blacklist	Young Donald Ressler	Episode: "Brothers"
2020	The Good Lord Bird	Jason Brown	Main cast
2021–2022	Dexter: New Blood	Harrison Morgan	Main cast
2023	Poker Face	Randy	Episode: "The Future of the Sport"
2025–present	Dexter: Resurrection	Harrison Morgan	Main cast

=== Film ===
Year	Title	Role	Notes
2025	Killing Faith	Edward Yacht	

== Awards and nominations ==
Year	Association	Category	Nominated work	Result
2022	Saturn Awards	Best Performance by a Younger Actor in a Network/Cable Television Series	Dexter: New Blood	Nominated
