= Circle of Friends (Dexter) =

- Dexter episode
- Debra Morgan (Jennifer Carpenter) and Rudy Cooper (Christian Camargo) together.
- Episode no.: Season 1 Episode 7
- Directed by: Steve Shill
- Written by: Daniel Cerone
- Cinematography by: Romeo Tirone
- Editing by: Padraic McKinley
- Original release date: November 12, 2006
- Running time: 52 minutes

Guest appearances
- Geoff Pierson as Tom Matthews; C. S. Lee as Vince Masuka; Mark Pellegrino as Paul Bennett; Sam Witwer as Neil Perry; Christian Camargo as Rudy Cooper; Mark L. Young as Jeremy Downs; Lizette Carrión as Shanda; Brad William Henke as Tony Tucci

Episode chronology
← Previous "Return to Sender"	Next → "Shrink Wrap"
- Dexter season 1

"Circle of Friends" is the seventh episode of the first season of the American crime drama television series Dexter. The episode was written by co-executive producer Daniel Cerone, and directed by Steve Shill. It originally aired on Showtime on November 12, 2006.

Set in Miami, the series centers on Dexter Morgan, a forensic technician specializing in bloodstain pattern analysis for the fictional Miami Metro Police Department, who leads a secret parallel life as a vigilante serial killer, hunting down murderers who have not been adequately punished by the justice system due to corruption or legal technicalities. In the episode, the police finds a key suspect as the Ice Truck Killer, while Dexter faces Rita's abusive ex-husband.

According to Nielsen Media Research, the episode was seen by an estimated 0.61 million household viewers and gained a 0.3 ratings share among adults aged 18–49. The episode received highly positive reviews from critics, although some felt that the twist ending was predictable.

== Plot ==
Debra and Batista identify the Ice Truck Killer as Neil Perry, a taxidermist with a history of violent mental illness. After they arrest Perry, he gleefully confesses to the crimes. However, Dexter later meets Perry and suspects he is not telling the truth. LaGuerta sees Perry's arrest as a way to advance her political career, but feels betrayed when her superior, Captain Matthews, takes the credit. Debra approaches Rudy, a prosthetic manufacturer who works at the hospital, and asks him on a date.

Meanwhile, Rita must try to adjust herself when Paul, her recently paroled husband, shows up to visit their children, Astor and Cody. Dexter tries to cover up a past mistake when Jeremy Downs, a victim whom he allowed to escape, is arrested again for a murder charge. Dexter confronts him in a police interrogation room and asks why he killed again. Jeremy admits that he can't feel anything, and he thought that killing would bring him something different. Dexter explains to Jeremy that he is the same way, and tells him only to kill people who deserve to die.

Rita tells Paul that if he can handle supervised visits for six months, then she might consider letting him have unsupervised visitation. When she hands him divorce papers giving these conditions, Paul submits very quickly and signs them. Dexter wants to give Jeremy more of a guiding light, but soon learns he committed suicide in prison; he followed Dexter's advice and killed someone who deserved to die. Dexter, disappointed that the Ice Truck Killer was nothing more than a mentally disturbed psychopath, requests to see him so he can ask questions. After having a short exchange with Perry, Dexter is relieved to surmise that he is not the Ice Truck Killer.

== Production ==
=== Development ===
The episode was written by co-executive producer Daniel Cerone, and directed by Steve Shill. This was Cerone's second writing credit, and Shill's first directing credit.

== Reception ==
=== Viewers ===
In its original American broadcast, "Circle of Friends" was seen by an estimated 0.61 million household viewers with a 0.3 in the 18–49 demographics. This means that 0.3 percent of all households with televisions watched the episode. This was a slight increase in viewership from the previous episode, which was watched by an estimated 0.59 million household viewers with a 0.3 in the 18–49 demographics.

A censored version of the episode was broadcast on CBS on March 30, 2008. It was seen by an estimated 7.13 million household viewers with a 2.0/5 in the 18–49 demographics.

=== Critical reviews ===
"Circle of Friends" received highly positive reviews from critics. Eric Goldman of IGN gave the episode an "amazing" 9.3 out of 10, and wrote, "Dexter continues to move along at a brisk pace, and this week delivered one of its busiest and best episodes yet. All season long Dexter has been playing a strange game with the Ice Truck Killer, whose work Dexter so admires. Dexter may have his own personal code and only targets other criminals to kill, yet still he has developed an unsettling (not that Dexter isn't unsettling on his own) hero worship of the Ice Truck Killer, who constantly impresses him."

Paula Paige of TV Guide wrote, "I believe some of the best writing on TV is happening in the war room at Showtime. And frankly, no matter how creepy, I say, “bring it on.""

Jonathan Toomey of TV Squad wrote, "OK, so here goes. It's not that I disliked this episode. It just got me very frustrated... angry actually. This is a such a smart, intelligent show and I'd like to think it's attracting viewers of the same caliber. So why go and have an episode such as this one where anyone with half a brain could see right through it?" Television Without Pity gave the episode a "B" grade.

uframe= let's go in the office
