= Popping Cherry =

- Dexter episode
- Seargent James Doakes (Erik King) confronts Carlos Guerrero (Rudolf Martin) at his church.
- Episode no.: Season 1 Episode 3
- Directed by: Michael Cuesta
- Written by: Daniel Cerone
- Cinematography by: Romeo Tirone
- Editing by: Elena Maganini
- Original release date: October 15, 2006
- Running time: 49 minutes

Guest appearances
- Geoff Pierson as Tom Matthews; Rudolf Martin as Carlos Guerrero; C. S. Lee as Vince Masuka; Brad William Henke as Tony Tucci; Scott William Winters as Detective McNamara; Mark L. Young as Jeremy Downs; Denise Crosby as Nurse Mary; Lizette Carrión as Shanda; Dominic Janes as Young Dexter; Tom Schanley as Paul's Debt Collector; Amanda Wyss as Social Worker

Episode chronology
← Previous "Crocodile"	Next → "Let's Give the Boy a Hand"
- Dexter season 1

"Popping Cherry" is the third episode of the first season of the American crime drama television series Dexter. The episode was written by co-executive producer Daniel Cerone, and directed by co-executive producer Michael Cuesta. It originally aired on Showtime on October 15, 2006.

Set in Miami, the series centers on Dexter Morgan, a forensic technician specializing in bloodstain pattern analysis for the fictional Miami Metro Police Department, who leads a secret parallel life as a vigilante serial killer, hunting down murderers who have not been adequately punished by the justice system due to corruption or legal technicalities. In the episode, Dexter follows a paroled killer, while the police finds a possible suspect in the Ice Truck Killer case. Dexter's first kill is also explored.

According to Nielsen Media Research, the episode was seen by an estimated 0.38 million household viewers and gained a 0.2 ratings share among adults aged 18–49. The episode received positive reviews from critics, who praised the performances and pacing.

== Plot ==
A new victim of the Ice Truck Killer, nicknamed Cherry, is found at a hockey stadium. Debra (Jennifer Carpenter) knew Cherry, as she was a prostitute who often helped her. The police concludes that they must find the stadium's missing guard, Tony Tucci (Brad William Henke). As Dexter (Michael C. Hall) helps the police, he also follows Jeremy Downs (Mark L. Young), a teenage murderer who recently got paroled.

While LaGuerta (Lauren Vélez) believes Tucci is the Ice Truck Killer given his criminal record, Debra is still not convinced, given that the clues do not lead to Tucci as he does not have a car. They retrieve surveillance footage of Tucci placing Cherry's chopped body in the ice rink, but they deduce he is being instructed by a person off-screen. Debra gives this information to Tom Matthews (Geoff Pierson), asking him for help. While Matthews is not content with Debra ignoring protocol, he scolds LaGuerta for not listening to her. Dexter follows Jeremy to a swamp, where he has taken another boy, certain he will recreate his first murder. Dexter intervenes, forcing them to flee. Dexter regrets having tried to intervene, and also discovers that Jeremy stole his wallet from his car.

Rita (Julie Benz) is stalked by Ricky, her ex-husband Paul's dealer. As Paul never paid him money, he decides to take Rita's car as a collateral. Dexter offers to report him to the police, but Rita asks him not to intervene. Dexter is forced to help Rita when a social worker checks on the house, noting that Rita has lost her vehicle. The absence of Rita's car causes Astor (Christina Robinson) to stay in school after everyone left, so Dexter picks her up to take her home.

In flashbacks, a young Dexter (Dominic Janes) and Harry (James Remar) go hunting. Harry teaches Dexter in controlling his urge by shooting a deer, but letting him mercy kill the deer. Years later, Harry's health deteriorates, and he asks Dexter to remember everything he taught him. He tells Dexter that his nurse, Mary (Denise Crosby), is trying to kill him by overdosing him, something she has done to other patients. Harry gives his blessing to Dexter to kill her, and Dexter kills her at her house, becoming his first victim. (Note: This plotline is revisited in the first episode of Dexter: Original Sin.) Without her influence, Harry finally leaves the hospital, although he dies one year later from a different condition.

Doakes (Erik King) continues investigating Guerrero, believing he was involved in the death of a police officer. Guerrero warns him to not go forward with his plan. While going out with a few detectives, the detectives beat one of Guerrero's entrusted henchmen. Doakes is horrified, and the detectives tell him they know he will be framed but are doing it after he slept with Officer Ricky’s wife, Kara. Afterwards, Guerrero gets his men to follow Doakes. Dexter breaks into the halfway house Jeremy is living in and attacks him, but stops short when he realizes Jeremy killed his rapist. Sympathizing with Jeremy, Dexter simply takes back his wallet and leaves. The following day, he gets a new car for Rita.

== Production ==
=== Development ===
The episode was written by co-executive producer Daniel Cerone, and directed by co-executive producer Michael Cuesta. This was Cerone's first writing credit, and Cuesta's third directing credit.

== Reception ==
=== Viewers ===
In its original American broadcast, "Popping Cherry" was seen by an estimated 0.38 million household viewers with a 0.2 in the 18–49 demographics. This means that 0.2 percent of all households with televisions watched the episode. This was a slight decrease in viewership from the previous episode, which was watched by an estimated 0.42 million household viewers with a 0.2 in the 18–49 demographics.

A censored version of the episode was broadcast on CBS on March 2, 2008. It was seen by an estimated 6.90 million household viewers with a 2.0/5 in the 18–49 demographics.

=== Critical reviews ===
"Popping Cherry" received positive reviews from critics. Eric Goldman of IGN gave the episode a "great" 8 out of 10, and wrote, "The portrayal of Dexter's first "mission", and the sloppiness of it, compared to the cold precision he kills with now, was a subversive look at how far Dexter's come; it's easy to admire the skills he's honed, until you remember what those skills are exactly."

Paula Paige of TV Guide wrote, "He does have a heart. He just doesn't want to show it, and it has something to do with whatever happened to him before Harry and his wife took him in as their foster child. It's alluded to again in this ep."

Jonathan Toomey of TV Squad wrote, "Plenty was revealed this week and so far, Dexter has been moving at a very brisk, but sensible pace. Unlike some other shows that seem to have been dragging their feet as of late, Dexter is proving that viewers can be kept engaged by revealing a boatload of information, yet make them feel like they're still in the dark by episode's end." Television Without Pity gave the episode an "A" grade.
