= Dexter season 1 =

Drama series

Dexter
- Season 1
- DVD cover
- Showrunner: Clyde Phillips
- Starring: Michael C. Hall; Julie Benz; Jennifer Carpenter; Erik King; Lauren Vélez; David Zayas; James Remar
- No. of episodes: 12

Release
- Original network: Showtime
- Original release: October 1 – December 17, 2006

Season chronology
- Next → Season 2

The first season of Dexter is an adaptation of Jeff Lindsay's first novel in a series of the same name, Darkly Dreaming Dexter. Subsequent seasons have featured original storylines. This season aired from October 1, 2006 to December 17, 2006, and follows Dexter's (Michael C. Hall) investigation of "the Ice Truck Killer". Introduced in the first episode, "Dexter", this serial killer targets prostitutes and leaves their bodies severed and bloodless. At the same time, Dexter's adoptive sister, Debra Morgan (Jennifer Carpenter), a vice squad officer, aspires to work in the homicide department, and Dexter's girlfriend, Rita Bennett (Julie Benz), wants their relationship to be more intimate. Christian Camargo appears as Rudy Cooper and is a recurring character until the end of the season.

The season received critical acclaim, being praised as "bold, different and exciting, with a central character and performance that take your breath away" by the Daily News. The Wall Street Journal saw "the grotesqueries of Dexter" as "not something that can easily be dismissed with the old 'you don't have to watch' line", and concluded that, "We do have to live among the viewers who will be desensitized, or aroused, by this show". The season holds an 81% approval rating on Rotten Tomatoes, where the critical consensus reads, "Its dark but novel premise may be too grotesque for some, but Dexter is a compelling, elegantly crafted horror-drama."

The season received high ratings for Showtime; the pilot episode attracted more than a million viewers, giving the channel its highest ratings in nearly two years, while the finale "Born Free" drew an audience of 1.1 million viewers in the U.S. On average, the season was watched by two million viewers per episode during its original run when factoring in DVR viewers.

Due to the 2007–2008 Writers Guild of America strike and encouraged by the show's critical success and high ratings on Showtime, CBS, a national terrestrial broadcast network, announced in December 2007 that it was considering airing an edited version of the first season of Dexter for free-to-air broadcast. It began to broadcast it on February 17, 2008, and thus, Dexter became the first program in 20 years to air on a broadcast network after being shown on a premium cable channel. During the show's rerun on the CBS network in 2008, the ratings were much higher, reaching 8.2 million viewers during its premiere in February, giving the network its best rating in the 10 p.m. time slot since December the previous year. During its 12-week run, it dropped to 7.1 million in early April, and to 6.6 million during the season's finale on May 6.

== Plot ==
Dexter Morgan, a blood spatter analyst for the Miami Metro Police Department, is secretly a serial killer, arising from a traumatic incident connected to the death of his mother when he was three years old. His adoptive father, Detective Harry Morgan, saw these homicidal tendencies in Dexter as he grew up, and took him on hunting trips to sate his desires to kill. When Dexter admits to having desires to kill people, his adoptive father influences him to follow a "code": only kill murderers who have escaped prosecution of the law. Since Harry's death, Dexter has killed multiple people, all the while adhering to the code. As his father has taught him, he covers his tracks by taking the victim to a prepared room lined with plastic sheeting in order to easily dispose of the evidence at sea. He only keeps a blood sample of the victim on a glass slide, stored in a box hidden in his apartment. Neither his adoptive sister Debra Morgan nor those in the department know about his secret killings, although Sgt. James Doakes is suspicious of how interested Dexter is in reviewing crime scenes. To help appear normal, Dexter has started dating Rita Bennett, the mother of Astor and Cody, and whose husband Paul is in jail due to drug-related crimes. Because of her abusive previous relationship with Paul, Dexter finds Rita has little interest in sex, keeping their relationship ideal for his purposes. Paul is eventually let out of prison, and tries to get back together with Rita, despite the fact that Rita is planning to divorce him. Seeing Paul get abusive with Rita, Dexter frames Paul for possession of illegal drugs, sending him back to prison.

A string of murders of prostitutes leads to the identification of a new serial killer called "the Ice Truck Killer", due to how the victims' bodies are well-preserved by being kept chilled before they are found. Dexter identifies patterns of the serial killer from his own habits, and lets Debra know, helping the department get a lead on the killer and leading to Debra's promotion to Homicide. Her investigation leads her to meet Rudy Cooper, a prosthetics expert, and they start a relationship. Meanwhile, Dexter discovers that the Ice Truck Killer has broken into his apartment and left taunting clues, leading Dexter to believe that the Killer is playing a game with him.

After being notified that he was left a house by his just-deceased biological father, Joe Driscoll, Dexter realizes that his adoptive father was not entirely truthful, and leads him to memories of how his mother died. A gruesome, blood-filled murder scene causes Dexter to recall what had happened: criminals had placed him and his mother, Laura Moser, in a shipping container, killed Laura and dismembered her with a chainsaw. Dexter was locked up in the container in a pool of his mother's blood, to be rescued by Harry two days later. Harry had purposely altered the records to prevent Dexter from finding out.

Through Debra, Rudy tries to get closer to Dexter. Dexter comes first to suspect that Joe was murdered, and later affirms that Rudy Cooper is the Ice Truck Killer. With his identity blown, Rudy kidnaps Debra and draws Dexter into a trap to rescue her. Rudy reveals to Dexter that he is his older brother, Brian Moser, also left in the shipping container when Laura was killed. However, unlike Dexter, he was sent off to live in a mental institution. Brian too has developed serial killer tendencies, but did not have the code that Harry instilled in Dexter, and so used the Ice Truck Killer approach to help Dexter recall his past. Brian suggests to Dexter that they kill Debra together, but Dexter refuses. Brian gets away after a fight, and Dexter rescues Debra.

As police investigate, Doakes suspects Dexter of knowing more about the Ice Truck Killer than he is letting on. Brian attempts to capture Debra again, but falls into a trap laid by Dexter. Dexter apologizes to Brian before killing him, and leaves Brian's body to make it appear as suicide. The police rule the Ice Truck Killer case closed, though Doakes keeps close tabs on Dexter, still suspicious of his actions. Rita discovers evidence that Dexter may have set up Paul.

== Cast ==
=== Main cast ===
- Michael C. Hall as Dexter Morgan
- Julie Benz as Rita Bennett
- Jennifer Carpenter as Debra Morgan
- Erik King as James Doakes
- Lauren Vélez as María LaGuerta
- David Zayas as Angel Batista
- James Remar as Harry Morgan

=== Recurring cast ===
- C. S. Lee as Vince Masuka
- Christina Robinson as Astor Bennett
- Daniel Goldman as Cody Bennett
- Devon Graye, Dominic Janes and Maxwell Huckabee as young Dexter Morgan
- Geoff Pierson as Tom Matthews
- Christian Camargo as Brian Moser / Rudy Cooper
- Mark Pellegrino as Paul Bennett
- Brad William Henke as Tony Tucci
- Angela Alvarado as Nina Batista
- Sam Witwer as Neil Perry
- Sage Kirkpatrick as Laura Moser
- Margo Martindale as Camilla Figg

=== Guest cast ===
- Rudolf Martin as Carlos Guerrero
- Mark L. Young as Jeremy Downs
- Judith Scott as Esme Pascal
- Valerie Dillman as Valerie Castillo
- Jim Abele as Mike Donovan
- Ethan Smith as Jamie Jaworski
- Denise Crosby as Nurse Mary
- Gina Hecht as Mrs. Tucci
- José Zúñiga as Jorge Castillo
- Vernee Watson-Johnson as Ms. Doakes
- Tony Goldwyn as Emmett Meridian
- Malcolm-Jamal Warner as Rita's lawyer

== Crew ==
The series pilot was developed by James Manos, Jr. based on Jeff Lindsay's novel. Manos served as an executive producer for the pilot along with John Goldwyn and Sara Colleton. The pilot was produced by Dennis Bishop. Steven Brown also served as a producer for the pilot episode. Chad Tomasoski worked as an associate producer. The pilot was directed by Michael Cuesta.

Manos, Goldwyn and Colleton returned as executive producers for the first season. Mid-season Clyde Phillips became a fourth executive producer. Daniel Cerone joined the crew as a co-executive producer and writer. Pilot director Michael Cuesta returned as a co-executive producer and regular director. Melissa Rosenberg also joined the crew as a consulting producer and writer. Timothy Schlattmann served as a story editor and writer. Lauren Gussis worked as a staff writer throughout the first season. Dennis Bishop returned to produce further episodes but left midseason and was replaced by Robert Lloyd Lewis

== Critical reception ==
On Rotten Tomatoes the season has a rating of 82% (out of 34 reviews). Eric Golden of IGN wrote:

In its first season, Dexter quickly established itself as one of the most interesting series on TV. We've had a lot of anti-heroes on TV in recent years, with guys like Vic Mackey and Tony Soprano challenging the audiences' loyalty and asking us to see how much we're willing to accept or root for a person who might have their positive traits, but does a lot of awful things. Based on a series of novels, Dexter takes this to the next degree, because our "hero" isn't a dirty cop, or even a gangster, but rather a straight up serial killer.

This review was paired with a score of 8.

== Episodes ==
No. overall	No. in season	Title	Directed by	Written by	Original release date	U.S. viewers (millions)
1	1	"Dexter"	Michael Cuesta	James Manos Jr.	October 1, 2006	0.60
Dexter Morgan (Michael C. Hall) is introduced as a serial killer who kills other killers who have escaped from, or haven't been found by the justice system. By day he is a blood spatter analyst who works for the Homicide Department of the Miami Metro Police. Dexter has a quasi-relationship with Rita Bennett (Julie Benz), a similarly troubled divorcee raising two young children while her former husband is in prison. One day, Dexter is called to a murder scene involving mutilated bodies, but with no blood visible. The murderer, soon to be nicknamed the "Ice Truck Killer", intrigues Dexter with this intricate methodology and a personal message in the form of a mutilated doll. At the same time, Dexter's hard-nosed sister Debra (Jennifer Carpenter), a vice squad officer, tries to gain a transfer into the Homicide Department.
2	2	"Crocodile"	Michael Cuesta	Clyde Phillips	October 8, 2006	0.41
Dexter assists detectives Angel Batista (David Zayas) and James Doakes (Erik King) in investigating the murder of an officer, who was working undercover investigating drug baron Carlos Guerrero (Rudolf Martin). Doakes is personally involved in the case, since he was having an affair with the officer's wife, who was also attacked. Meanwhile, Debra discovers the refrigerated truck in which the Ice Truck Killer dismembers his victims, and is promoted by her superior, Lieutenant María LaGuerta (Lauren Vélez), to the Homicide Department. Inside the truck, Debra, Batista, and Dexter find a block of ice with five fingertips in it, left deliberately by the Ice Truck Killer.
3	3	"Popping Cherry"	Michael Cuesta	Daniel Cerone	October 15, 2006	0.38
After the discovery of another victim of the Ice Truck Killer at an ice rink, the missing guard, Tony Tucci, becomes a potential suspect. Meanwhile, Rita receives an unpleasant visit from her ex-husband's drug dealer, who confiscates her car, forcing her to take the bus to and from her job as a hotel receptionist. Dexter selects his next murder victim while having flashbacks of his first killing—a nurse (Denise Crosby) who was caring for Dexter's sick father, Harry Morgan, but was administering overdoses of medication and slowly killing her patients. Elsewhere, Sergeant Doakes continues to harass Guerrero, as a group of renegade police officers decide to take matters involving Guerrero into their own hands.
4	4	"Let's Give the Boy a Hand"	Robert Lieberman	Drew Z. Greenberg	October 22, 2006	0.49
As the hunt for Ice Truck Killer continues, posed body parts are discovered which appear to be the calling cards of an increasingly impatient killer. The Ice Truck Killer escalates his killing spree, leaving body parts of his latest victim at sites connected to Dexter's childhood, which leads Dexter to confront his dark personal history. As Halloween approaches, Rita kidnaps a barking dog from a cynical owner because it keeps her children up at night, and gives it to a loving family. Meanwhile, Lieutenant LaGuerta seeks to comfort the mother of the latest Ice Truck Killer victim. Dexter finds the victim mutilated but alive and strapped to a table for Dexter to kill. Instead, Dexter reports the crime scene anonymously to his sister. The pressure on Sergeant Doakes escalates when Guerrero's associates begin following him.
5	5	"Love American Style"	Robert Lieberman	Melissa Rosenberg	October 29, 2006	0.46
Rita learns that her colleague's fiancé, who was illegally immigrating from Cuba, is missing, and asks Dexter to investigate the problem using his police connections. He investigates Jorge Castillo, a salvage yard owner, and discovers that Castillo is murdering the smuggled immigrants who cannot pay for their freedom. Dexter discovers that Castillo's wife is involved in the murders, and kills both of them. Afterwards, he dumps their bodies in the ocean and frees their Cuban prisoners, not noticing a person watching him from the trunk of a car in the yard. Meanwhile, Debra and Doakes question Tucci about the Ice Truck Killer, and through him they find their first bit of tangible evidence.
6	6	"Return to Sender"	Tony Goldwyn	Tim Schlattmann	November 5, 2006	0.59
The body of one of Dexter's previous female victims has been found, despite Dexter's having thrown both of the corpses into the ocean. A young Cuban boy had witnessed the previous night's events, and Dexter dismisses his colleagues' leads that could direct them towards him. Eventually, Dexter frames the husband, whose body is still missing, with his wife's murder. The witness describes Jesus Christ rather than Dexter. During this time, Rita dissuades her abusive husband, Paul, from attending their daughter's birthday party after he is released early from prison.
7	7	"Circle of Friends"	Steve Shill	Daniel Cerone	November 12, 2006	0.61
Dexter must deal with Rita's menacing husband. Debra goes on a date with the prosthetics expert who made prosthetic legs for an Ice Truck Killer survivor. Debra and Angel are investigating the Ice Truck Killer and discover a familiar name with speeding violations near the scene of the Ice Truck Killer's third murder. Dexter investigates Sergeant Doakes's knife victim; he already knows the killer's identity but needs time to locate him. The Ice Truck Killer is finally apprehended, but Dexter doubts that they have caught the correct man.
8	8	"Shrink Wrap"	Tony Goldwyn	Lauren Gussis	November 19, 2006	0.57
An unexplained suicide of a wealthy and powerful woman leads Dexter to suspect that her psychologist, Dr. Emmett Meridian, may have killed her. But he gets a shock when a visit to the suspect reveals dark secrets from Dexter's past. Elsewhere, Rita becomes warmer towards her ex-husband Paul, who claims to have reformed. She wants to become more intimate with Dexter, who is afraid of physically consummating their relationship, but then he is able to have sex with her and once they have finished, he is worried that he might have scared her. Meanwhile, Debra is falling in love with her new boyfriend Rudy. At the end of the episode, the audience finds out that Rudy is the Ice Truck Killer, while unknown to the characters.
9	9	"Father Knows Best"	Adam Davidson	Melissa Rosenberg	November 26, 2006	0.76
Dexter learns that his biological father, Joe Driscoll, who he thought had been long dead, has only recently died and has left all of his belongings to Dexter, including his house. Dexter travels to the house with Rita. Debra and Rudy arrive there later (following Rudy's advice) to assist him in cleaning out the house. Dexter suspects Joe Driscoll's death to be murder. Flashbacks to Dexter's childhood show him questioning his foster father Harry (James Remar) about his real parents, and Dexter finds that Mr. Driscoll donated some of his blood to the young Dexter for surgery. In the last scene, one of Joe's neighbors, an elderly woman, recognizes Rudy as a cable repairman, who happened to be Joe's last visitor before his death; after Dexter, Rita, Debra and Rudy had left the premises, Rudy is shown returning to the elderly woman's house dressed as the cable repairman again. Meanwhile, Paul begins to slide back into his old abusive habits when Rita attempts to prevent him from seeing their children. Doakes is under investigation after shooting a fleeing suspect, and Batista wrestles with his conscience as he realises that the evidence doesn't fit Doakes's version of events.
10	10	"Seeing Red"	Michael Cuesta	Kevin R. Maynard	December 3, 2006	0.79
Dexter is sent to investigate a horrific blood-soaked crime scene, which he usually enjoys, but is taken aback by a long-suppressed memory of a childhood trauma instead. Rita is charged with assaulting Paul and could lose her children in a custody battle. However, when Dexter finds out, he decides to remove Paul from his and Rita's lives, but by framing him rather than killing him. Angel investigates a hunch regarding the Ice Truck Killer concerning amputee fetish; he turns to Rudy for help but ends up getting stabbed in the parking lot. Meanwhile, Rudy displays a growing interest in getting to know Dexter, particularly in the lately awoken trauma he had recently experienced.
11	11	"Truth Be Told"	Keith Gordon	Drew Z. Greenberg & Tim Schlattmann	December 10, 2006	0.76
The Ice Truck Killer strikes again, leaving a real nightmare before Christmas at Santa's Cottage. Sergeant Doakes becomes more suspicious about Dexter after his ambivalence about Batista's survival. Dexter finally finds he is connected to the Ice Truck Killer over a past case involving Harry Morgan and a blood-bath crime scene in 1973 involving Dexter's biological mother. Lieutenant LaGuerta braces herself as Captain Matthews blames her for the department's failure to find the Ice Truck Killer and he has her replaced. Rudy and Debra spend some quality time together, and Rudy proposes marriage to the smitten detective. Rita decides to take her children, Astor and Cody, to visit Paul, who has been sent back to prison.
12	12	"Born Free"	Michael Cuesta	Daniel Cerone & Melissa Rosenberg	December 17, 2006	1.08
Doakes and LaGuerta begin to suspect that Rudy is the Ice Truck Killer, while Dexter finds a suspicious picture of the shipping container where his mother was killed. Doakes begins tailing Dexter, convinced that he is somehow connected to the Ice Truck Killer. A call from her ex-husband makes Rita suspicious of Dexter and his behavior. LaGuerta's replacement, Lt. Esme Pascal (Judith Scott) arrives and takes over the Ice Truck Killer investigation. Dexter recalls that Rudy is in fact his biological brother, whose real name is Brian Moser. Brian intends to kill Debra with Dexter in a reunion with his true family, but Dexter stops him. As the police close in, Brian escapes and Dexter is left with Debra, appearing to have saved her. The same night, Brian breaks into Dexter's apartment and attempts to stab Debra, but Dexter captures him. After an emotionally charged conversation, Dexter slices his brother's throat and leaves him upside down to drain, staging it as a suicide, while wondering what would happen if everyone knew the truth about him.
