= Born Free (Dexter) =

- Dexter episode
- Rudy Cooper/Brian Moser (Christian Camargo) helps Dexter Morgan (Michael C. Hall) remember his past.
- Episode no.: Season 1 Episode 12
- Directed by: Michael Cuesta
- Written by: Daniel Cerone; Melissa Rosenberg
- Original air date: December 17, 2006

Guest appearances
- Geoff Pierson as Tom Matthews; C. S. Lee as Vince Masuka; Mark Pellegrino as Paul Bennett; Christian Camargo as Rudy Cooper; Judith Scott as Esme Pascal; Scott Atkinson as Bob Hicks; Christina Robinson as Astor Bennett; Daniel Goldman as Cody Bennett; Maxwell Huckabee as young Dexter Morgan; Brandon Killham as young Rudy Cooper; Katherine Kirkpatrick as Laura Moser

Episode chronology
← Previous "Truth Be Told"	Next → "It's Alive!"
- Dexter (season 1)

"Born Free" is the twelfth episode of season one and first-season finale of the American television drama series Dexter, which aired on December 17, 2006 on Showtime in the United States. The episode also aired on May 4, 2008 on CTV in Canada; on May 14, 2008 on FX in the UK; on September 28, 2008 on Channel Ten in Australia; and on March 21, 2011 on STAR World in India. The episode was written by Daniel Cerone and executive producer Melissa Rosenberg, and was directed by Michael Cuesta. Based on the novel Darkly Dreaming Dexter by Jeff Lindsay, the season featured many differences to the original source, mainly in the lead-up to and revelation of the identity of the "Ice Truck Killer". The episode received critical acclaim.

The episode focuses on the final confrontation between Dexter and the "Ice Truck Killer". After kidnapping Debra Morgan (Jennifer Carpenter), Rudy Cooper (Christian Camargo) is in the final stages of his plan to reunite with his long-lost brother. James Doakes (Erik King) and María LaGuerta (Lauren Vélez) investigate the case, and Doakes begins to suspect that Dexter is involved. Meanwhile, Paul Bennett (Mark Pellegrino) tries to convince Rita Bennett (Julie Benz) that Dexter is not who she thinks he is.

== Plot ==
Dexter rushes to find Debra, discovering that her boyfriend Rudy is the Ice Truck Killer. Since the killer had always sent secret messages to Dexter, he searched his apartment for clues that Rudy could have left, finding a picture of the shipping container where his mother was killed. When Dexter is about to leave, Doakes and LaGuerta arrive, telling him that they think Rudy stabbed Batista. Doakes insists that Dexter knows something, and he reveals that the blood on Batista's collar matches Rudy's. After the pair leaves, Dexter searches for the shipping container. At the station, LaGuerta orders a search for Rudy. Matthews walks in and introduces Esmee Pascal, the new lieutenant who is replacing her.

Dexter breaks into the container in the picture at the shipping yard, only to find it full of bananas. Doakes appears and asks him what he is doing. After a fistfight between the two, a foreman arrives and orders them to leave. Doakes tells Dexter that he knows he is up to something and says he will be watching him. Meanwhile, Rita is contacted by an imprisoned Paul, who contends that Dexter knocked him out and set him up. She is visited by Paul's Narcotics Anonymous sponsor, who attempts to convince her that Paul is telling the truth. In a final plea, Paul calls Rita and tells her to search their house for a shoe, which he believes came off when Dexter knocked him out. Rita hangs up but discovers the shoe while taking out the trash.

After finding a clue at Rudy's house, Dexter arrives at the house of his biological mother, Laura Moser. Flashbacks reveal that Rudy, whose real name is Brian Moser, is, in fact, Dexter's brother. He also witnessed the murder of their mother but did not repress the memory; instead, he grew up in a mental institution and was treated for antisocial personality disorder. Dexter meets Brian in their childhood home, where Brian is keeping Debra. He intends to kill Debra with Dexter as a sort of "family reunion," but Dexter stops him. As Doakes and the police close in on the house, Brian escapes through a trap door, and Dexter is left with Debra, having appeared to have saved her.

Doakes tries questioning Dexter about his involvement but is stopped by an indignant Debra, who says Dexter is a hero. Dexter accompanies her to the hospital before the two return to Dexter's apartment. In the middle of the night, Brian breaks in and attempts to stab Debra, only to find a prosthetic body in her place; Dexter then chokes him unconscious with a garrote. In the refrigeration unit in Brian's apartment, Dexter ties him to the killing table with plastic wrap. After an emotionally charged conversation, Dexter slices his brother's throat and leaves him upside down to drain, staging it as a suicide. Dexter and Debra arrive at a crime scene, and he imagines what it would be like if everyone knew and happily accepted the truth about him.

== Production ==
"Born Free" was written by Daniel Cerone and executive producer Melissa Rosenberg, and was directed by Michael Cuesta. Cerone and Rosenberg have written two previous episodes each, while this episode marked Cuesta's fifth time returning as director. Guest stars in this episode include Geoff Pierson, C. S. Lee, Mark Pellegrino, Christian Camargo, Judith Scott and Scott Atkinson. Rudy's apartment was set in Miami, Florida, however filming took place in Long Beach, California. The apartment was a brown, triangular apartment condo, so the producers altered its appearance; a false brick wall was placed in front of the garage entrance and a door was created. The producers also concealed a narrow door of the garage entrance with a potted plant, and added false window panes to the windows, concealing the existing vertical blinds. The shipping yard shown in the episode was set in the Port of Miami, yet filming took place in a port dock at the Port of Los Angeles. The scene was filmed in San Pedro, California, in a waterfront lot of Harbor Boulevard.

The first season of Dexter is based on the novel Darkly Dreaming Dexter by Jeff Lindsay. However, there are numerous differences, ranging from extra subplots to rearrangements and modifications of elements from the source material. The biggest change is the lead-up to and revelation of the identity of the "Ice Truck Killer", called the "Tamiami Butcher" in the novel. In the novel, Dexter is led to believe that he might be the one committing the murders, due to a series of strange dreams that connect him to the murder. The final clue is a blurry photo, taken from surveillance footage, of a man who resembles Dexter at a crime scene. After the "Tamiami Killer" kidnaps Deborah, Dexter finds and confronts him. It is subsequently revealed that the killer is actually Dexter's nearly identical long-lost brother, Brian, who, like Dexter, witnessed their mother's brutal murder. Dexter is followed by Detective LaGuerta, who is slain by Brian. Debra finds out her brother is a killer and Dexter helps Brian to escape. In the television series, Brian is introduced under the fake name Rudy, a prosthetist who becomes Debra's boyfriend. Dexter hesitantly kills Brian instead of letting him escape, Debra does not discover her brother's secret, and LaGuerta is not present at all in the confrontation. In the novel, Dexter and his brother are nearly identical, whereas the actors playing the two characters are distinct from each other in their looks.

== Reception ==
"Born Free" was the most-watched original series telecast on Showtime since 2004, when the Nielsen ratings started separating the channel's ratings from Showtime Plex, the package of Showtime channels offered by most cable and satellite systems. The finale drew an audience of 1.1 million American viewers, a significant increase over the series premiere, which attracted slightly more than 600,000 viewers. The first season attracted on average 1.96 million American viewers, including live and DVR viewing off the premium channel's main feed. "Born Free" brought in 589,000 viewers on its first free-to-air broadcast in Australia. Hall submitted the episode for consideration for a Primetime Emmy Award for Outstanding Lead Actor in a Drama Series, but was not ultimately nominated.

"Born Free" has received critical acclaim. Eric Goldman of IGN said that "Born Free" was "an intense episode that brought the Ice Truck Killer story to a satisfying conclusion." He felt that the "biggest shock of all" was the reveal of Rudy as Dexter's brother, and described their confrontation as "riveting". Goldman gave the episode an "incredible" rating of 9.5 out of 10. Paula Paige of TV Guide was "impressed" by Michael Hall's "incredible acting ability," praising his ability to transform from a "stoic killer to overwrought brother in a matter of moments." She said that the series went "from being a good show to a fantastic show in the course of one season," and hoped that "the sophomore season will be just as terrific." Jonathan Toomey of TV Squad felt that it would be a "shame" if Hall did not win a Golden Globe Award, saying that he "certainly deserves it." He understood why Rudy wanted to make Debra the brothers' first victim together; Rudy was jealous of the life that Dexter received and killing Debra was the symbol of that life dying. Although Toomey said that the episode was "really well written," he was troubled that no one made the connection between Dexter and Rudy when all they had to do was read Rudy's file, but Toomey speculated that it could be discovered the next season.
