= Love American Style (Dexter) =

- Dexter episode
- Dexter Morgan (Michael C. Hall) and Angel Batista (David Zayas) along with the rest of Miami Metro Homicide wait in suspense.
- Episode no.: Season 1 Episode 5
- Directed by: Robert Lieberman
- Written by: Melissa Rosenberg
- Production code: 105
- Original air date: October 29, 2006

Guest appearances
- C. S. Lee as Vince Masuka; Christian Camargo as Rudy Cooper; Sam Witwer as Neil Perry; Brad William Henke as Tony Tucci; José Zúñiga as Jorge Castillo; Angela Alvarado Rosa as Nina Batista; Monique Curnen as Yelina; Valerie Dillman as Valerie Castillo; Scott MacDonald as Officer Gerard; Lizette Carrion as Shanda; Minerva Garcia as Mariel; Devon Graye as Teenage Dexter Morgan; Ashley Rose Orr as Mindy; June Angela as Doctor; Josh Daugherty as Morgue Attendant; Carmen Olivares as Attractive Woman #1; Norma Fontana as Attractive Woman #2; Allysa Tacher as Screaming Jogger; Terry Woodberry as Tech

Episode chronology
← Previous "Let's Give the Boy a Hand"	Next → "Return to Sender"
- Dexter (season 1)

"Love American Style" is the fifth episode of the first season of the American television drama series Dexter, which first aired on October 29, 2006 on Showtime in the United States. The episode was written by Melissa Rosenberg and was directed by Robert Lieberman. In the episode, Dexter Morgan (Michael C. Hall) hunts down Jorge Castillo (José Zúñiga), a human trafficker and murderer. His sister, Ofr. Debra Morgan (Jennifer Carpenter), attempts to extract information from a security guard whose limbs were amputated by the "Ice Truck Killer". The episode also features the first appearance of Christian Camargo as Rudy Cooper.

The episode was the first to be written by Rosenberg; it was her first for a cable show, and she finished writing the script five weeks early. Filming took place at numerous locations in and around Miami, Florida and Los Angeles, California. The scenes filmed in Florida were shot in July 2006 and those in California were shot later. "Love American Style" received generally positive reviews from critics and was watched by 6.7 million people when it was broadcast by CBS eighteen months after its Showtime premiere.

== Plot ==
Dexter is called to the abandoned hospital where he previously rescued Tony Tucci. Debra and Doakes question Tucci when he wakes up in hospital, but Doakes is unimpressed with Debra's ways of extracting information. He initially disapproves of her suggestion to blindfold Tucci to help him to remember his encounter with the Ice Truck Killer, but eventually relents. After being blindfolded, Tucci remembers that the killer used throat lozenges. They return to the crime scene and find a lozenge wrapper, on which Masuka finds a partial fingerprint.

Rita comforts her upset co-worker, Yelina (Monique Curnen), and learns that her fiancé, an illegal immigrant from Cuba, is missing. Rita asks Dexter to look into the problem using his police connections, and he finds a list of subjects from a past police case. He turns his focus to Jorge Castillo, a salvage yard owner engaged in people smuggling. After Yelina's fiancé washes up dead on a beach, Dexter discovers that Castillo is murdering immigrants who cannot pay for their freedom.

Dexter leads Castillo into an Airstream trailer in his salvage yard, but as he prepares to kill him, Castillo's wife Valerie (Valerie Dillman) arrives. Dexter realizes that the couple are working together, and decides to kill both inside the trailer. After doing so, he dumps their bodies in the ocean and frees their Cuban prisoners, not noticing the person watching him from the trunk of a car in the yard. In flashbacks, a teenage Dexter (Devon Graye) learns from Harry (James Remar) how to fake joy in a romantic date with a girl.

== Production ==
"Love American Style" was written by Melissa Rosenberg and directed by Robert Lieberman. The episode was Rosenberg's first for the series and her first on a show written for a premium network. Having had over 10 years' experience in writing for free-to-air commercial networks—which typically have 22–26 episodes per season rather than 12, with a much tighter schedule—she finished writing the script five weeks before it was due for preparation. She said that "There was time to think about storytelling. I never had that on any show; it's just wonderful."

Filming took place in both Los Angeles and Miami. The scenes filmed in Miami were shot in July 2006; those in Los Angeles were shot later. Scenes at the beach where Yelina talks with Rita and where her fiancé's body washes up were filmed at South Beach Park in Fort Lauderdale, Florida, north of Miami. A waterfront house on Hibiscus Island in Biscayne Bay, Florida stood in for the Castillos' home. The abandoned hospital where Dexter and the police find Tucci was filmed at the former Linda Vista Community Hospital in East Los Angeles, and Dexter's childhood home was filmed at a house in a residential neighborhood of Long Beach, California, where Rita's house is also filmed. Scenes in the salvage yard were filmed at LA Japanese Auto Parts in Sun Valley, California. The Airstream trailer in which Dexter commits the double murder was brought into the salvage yard for filming externally, but was assembled on a studio sound stage for shooting scenes inside the trailer.

== Reception ==
"Love American Style" attracted 6.7 million viewers when broadcast on CBS in March 2008, 18 months after its original broadcast on Showtime.

IGN's Eric Goldman felt that the episode's juggling of multiple storylines was "satisfying", and that the scene in which Dexter prepares to kill Castillo was "terrific". Though he praised Debra and Doakes' storyline with Tucci, he wrote that "it was a bit disappointing to then see Deb be a bit too quickly vindicated at the end". Paula Paige, writing for TV Guide, said that the episode "will go down in cable history as Dexter's finest [episode] to date". She was pleased with Debra's character development and the "downright stylish" cinematography, but thought that Jorge and Valerie's final, passionate words to each other were "too much for me". Ray Ellis of Blogcritics believed that the episode "takes the series into a more three-dimensional direction". He described the episode's subplots and themes as what "make Dexter compelling", and wrote that Debra's character reached a more "empathic level" in the episode. TV Squad critic Keith McDuffee praised the increasing complexity of Dexter's relationship with his father through flashbacks, and thought that Dexter's voiceovers were "the best thing about this show".
