= It's Alive! (Dexter) =

- Dexter episode
- Dexter Morgan (Michael C. Hall) with Debra Morgan (Jennifer Carpenter), who is off-screen, watch a news report about the discovery of bodies on the ocean floor.
- Episode no.: Season 2 Episode 1
- Directed by: Tony Goldwyn
- Written by: Daniel Cerone
- Production code: 201
- Original air date: September 30, 2007

Guest appearances
- Judith Scott as Esme Pascal; Mark Pellegrino as Paul Bennett; Glenn Plummer as Jimmy Sensio; Devon Graye as Teenage Dexter Morgan; Max Gail as Banana Boat Tour Guide; Preston Bailey as Cody Bennett; Christina Robinson as Astor Bennett; Matthew Willig as Little Chino; Anna Maganini as Eva; Claude Shires as Annoying Man; Ron Rogge as Blue-Collar Guy; Craig Patton as Customs Officer; Jillian Bruno as Marissa

Episode chronology
← Previous "Born Free"	Next → "Waiting to Exhale"
- Dexter (season 2)

"It's Alive!" is the second season premiere and thirteenth overall episode of the American television drama series Dexter, which first aired on September 30, 2007, on Showtime in the United States. The episode was written by Daniel Cerone and was directed by Tony Goldwyn. In the episode, which takes place five weeks after the first-season finale, Sgt. James Doakes (Erik King) is following Dexter Morgan (Michael C. Hall) at all times, but when he gets his first opportunity Dexter finds himself unable to kill. Meanwhile, his sister Debra (Jennifer Carpenter) returns to work after her ex-fiancé Brian tried to kill her, and his girlfriend Rita Bennett (Julie Benz) refuses to believe that Dexter sent her ex-husband Paul (Mark Pellegrino) to prison in spite of the evidence in front of her.

Although Dexter's first season was adapted from Jeff Lindsay's novel Darkly Dreaming Dexter, the show's writers decided not to follow Lindsay's second novel, Dearly Devoted Dexter, in the second season. Filming of the episode began in May in Los Angeles, California, marking the show's permanent move from Miami, Florida, where the show takes place. A small crew flew to Miami to film short pieces of Dexter which were integrated into "It's Alive!" and other episodes, but the bulk of filming took place in San Pedro and Long Beach. With 1.09 million viewers, Dexter became the first Showtime series to attract over a million viewers with a season premiere. The episode received mostly positive reviews.

== Plot ==
Since murdering the Ice Truck Killer five weeks previously, Dexter Morgan has been followed by the suspicious Sgt. James Doakes and thus cannot satisfy his urge to kill. Trying to act "relentlessly normal," he goes bowling almost nightly with his co-workers. Dexter is finally left alone when Doakes gives up and takes a night off; he pursues a blind voodoo priest named Jimmy but finds himself ultimately unable to kill him. At a crime scene, the victim's mother pleads with Dexter to kill her son's murderer, gang lord "Little Chino." Seeing the woman's young daughter, he is reminded of having witnessed his own mother's brutal death as a child.

After leading Doakes to believe he is bowling for the night, Dexter brings Chino to Jimmy's killing room. However, Chino wakes up in the middle of Dexter's procedure and manages to escape. Meanwhile, Dexter's sister Debra exercises incessantly and is barely able to sleep as she struggles with memories of her ex-fiancé, Brian Moser, trying to kill her. When she returns to work, Sgt. María LaGuerta expresses concern about her emotional stability. However, Debra is determined to resume her life. When she takes Dexter's girlfriend Rita out to a bar, a man recognizes Debra as the fiancé of the Ice Truck Killer. She instinctively punches him when he touches her shoulder, sure that he is trying to grab her.

Rita takes her children Astor and Cody to see the imprisoned Paul, who continues to insist that he was framed by Dexter and that his missing shoe would prove his innocence. Despite having found it over a month ago, Rita tells him there is no shoe. She later admits that she found the shoe but refuses to acknowledge that Dexter is involved. That night, she receives a call from the prison and learns that another inmate has killed Paul. Flashbacks show the attempts of a teenage Dexter to feel his heartbeat. In the present, Dexter and Debra watch a news report showing a team of scuba divers recovering thirty garbage bags from Biscayne Bay, each containing parts of Dexter's mutilated victims. As he watches, his heart races.

== Production ==
The first season of Dexter followed the same storyline of Jeff Lindsay's novel Darkly Dreaming Dexter, the first in the series of novels on which the television show is based, albeit with many additional elements and altered characters. When writing the second season, Daniel Cerone said that the writers "didn't see the opportunity in the second book" to continue on the path that they hoped to go down and chose to depart from Lindsay's second Dexter novel, Dearly Devoted Dexter. Instead, they chose "to turn our biggest card up - "What if Dexter's bodies were discovered?" - and just chart that course throughout the season." According to executive producer Clyde Phillips, they decided to resume the second season storyline five weeks after season one's finale "so all of the emotional resonance of what each [character] went through [...] will continue as if that were the actual passage of time, so they're still dented and rocked by what has happened." Cerone added that "The nice thing with Dexter is it's actually the lack of emotional resonance." Speaking about Dexter's situation at the beginning of the second season, Hall said, "I think his world is pretty rocked. He encountered [his brother], a person he never anticipated encountering, someone who sees him for who he is, accepts him as such, and he really has no choice but to do him in ... he's still reeling from that, and any footing he's able to establish for himself is pretty much immediately pulled out from under him."

With filming beginning on May 21, 2007, "It's Alive!" marked the permanent relocation of production from Miami to Los Angeles. Five episodes of the first season were shot on location in Miami, which Cerone said was "a bigger hassle than it was worth". Showtime programming chief Robert Greenblatt said that "It just became impossible, production-wise, to shoot the whole show [in Miami]", because of the overlap between Dexter's production window and Florida's hurricane season, making property insurance costly. A small crew flew to Miami with Hall and filmed, according to producer Sara Colleton, "a lot of pieces—not just Dexter walking in and out of his door or car, but also scenes that we know we'll need and can use", which the writers then worked into the episode and others. For the episode, Biscayne Bay was substituted with a set in Los Angeles, while most on location scenes were filmed in and around San Pedro and Long Beach, California.

== Reception ==
"It's Alive!" brought in 1.09 million viewers in the United States, making Dexter the first Showtime series to attract over a million viewers with a season premiere, while an additional 414,000 people watched the late-night encore. The ratings were 67 percent higher than the series pilot and 40 percent above the first season's average. The episode attracted 471,000 Australian viewers on its first free-to-air broadcast. In the United Kingdom, the episode drew 348,000 viewers, an increase of 50,000 from the pilot. Production sound mixer Patrick Hanson and re-recording sound mixers Elmo Ponsdomenech and Joe Earle, received a Creative Arts Primetime Emmy Award nomination, in the category Outstanding Sound Mixing for a Comedy or Drama Series (One-Hour), but lost to the sound mixers of the Lost episode "Meet Kevin Johnson". Stewart Schill, the editor of "It's Alive!", received an Eddie Award nomination for Best Edited One-Hour Series for Non-Commercial Television. However, the eventual recipient of the award was Sidney Wolinsky, for The Sopranos.

The episode was positively received. Writing for Variety, Brian Lowry called the second season's opening "a bloody winner" and said that Hall's performance "remains a towering achievement". IGN's Eric Goldman thought that the episode's biggest problem was "having to follow up such a great first season", but called "It's Alive!" "a solid episode". He praised Dexter's flashbacks and Dexter and Debra's storylines, though he said that Doakes' following Dexter was "ridiculous" and that LaGuerta's overhearing Lt. Esmee Pascal's private conversation was "a bit contrived". Keith McDuffee of TV Squad "love[d] the flashbacks to a young Dexter and living Harry". Regarding the episode's end, he wrote that "just as Dexter's heart beats out of his chest, as does ours." Paula Paige, writing for TV Guide, said that the episode "made for some exciting, heart-pounding fear" and called the discovery of Dexter's corpses "a fantastic storyline". She commended Benz for "develop[ing] her character, Rita, into a person instead of just the shell of one she appeared to be". Blogcritics' Ray Ellis commented, "If ['It's Alive!'] is any indication, Dexter's second season looks to delve deeper into the psyches of its characters. It certainly sets up a number of plot complexities [...] and new devices that offer a myriad of new developments." The A.V. Club critic Scott Tobias stated that "the writers have done a solid job setting the table for season two".
