= Crocodile (Dexter) =

- Dexter episode
- Dexter Morgan (Michael C. Hall) checks his fridge to see if the Ice Truck Killer has left anything behind.
- Episode no.: Season 1 Episode 2
- Directed by: Michael Cuesta
- Written by: Clyde Phillips
- Original air date: October 8, 2006

Guest appearances
- Geoff Pierson as Tom Matthews; Sam Trammell as Matt Chambers; Rudolf Martin as Carlos Guerrero; Cristos as Norberto Cervantes; C. S. Lee as Vince Masuka; Richard Gunn as Sean; Lisa Kaminir as Prosecutor; Christina Robinson as Astor Bennett; Daniel Goldman as Cody Bennett; Maureen Muldoon as Kara Simmons; Devon Graye as Teenage Dexter Morgan; Alex Schemmer as Alexander Pryce; Roger Hewlett as Mr. Pryce

Episode chronology
← Previous "Dexter"	Next → "Popping Cherry"
- Dexter season 1

"Crocodile" is the second episode of the first season of American drama series Dexter. The episode centers on the death of a police officer, Ricky Simmons, and the Miami Metro Police Department's attempt at bringing in the killer. In the meantime, Dexter stalks his next victim, Matt Chambers, a man who kills people by running them over while drunk.

== Plot ==
Debra visits Dexter to talk about the Ice Truck Killer case. Afterwards, Dexter examines the Barbie doll the killer left in his apartment and realizes the hands have differently painted fingernails. After giving evidence at a trial, he enters another courtroom where Matt Chambers (Sam Trammell) is being tried for manslaughter after drunkenly running over a teenager with his car.

Dexter travels to a crime scene under the Westbound Causeway, where he notices a piece of human flesh in the dead victim's mouth. At the station, Debra tells Dexter about her new boyfriend Sean. They make plans to have a lunch date along with Dexter's girlfriend Rita. The victim at the causeway is discovered to be a police officer named Ricky Simmons. LaGuerta and Doakes go to his home, where they find his wife Kara injured but alive. While analysing the scene, Dexter finds a drop of blood that is not hers.

Dexter tells Rita about the lunch date. Debra calls to tell Dexter she has found a refrigerated truck with human fingertips inside, which have fingernails painted like the doll's. The bitten-off skin from Simmons' mouth is linked to Norberto Cervantes, who is apprehended by Doakes after Cervantes meets with drug lord Carlos Guerrero. Under questioning, Cervantes claims Kara was having an affair; Doakes punches him. LaGuerta takes a blood sample from Cervantes to confirm the skin and blood was his. Meanwhile, Chambers testifies that his car was stolen hours before the teenager's death and that he has been sober for several months.

Dexter and Detective Angel Batista find more of Cervantes' blood at Kara's home. Dexter obtains Chambers's fingerprint and discovers that he has killed people while driving drunk in other states. He prepares his kill room before going on the double date. When Rita notices the apparent ease of Debra and Sean's relationship, she begins to feel insecure and Dexter has difficulty comforting her. Cervantes is killed in jail by a man impersonating a police officer. Later, Rita and Dexter agree not to have sex until Rita is ready.

Debra learns she is being promoted to Homicide. LaGuerta informs Doakes that Kara has died of heart failure and forces him to admit that they were sleeping together, agreeing to keep the relationship secret so Doakes can remain on the case. Dexter sees Guerrero and contemplates killing him, but decides against it. He kidnaps Chambers, forces him to confess, then kills him and disposes of the body. At home, he finds evidence that the Ice Truck Killer has broken into his apartment for a second time.

== Reception ==
"Crocodile" received mixed to positive reviews with much appraisal going to the opening sequence, which was first aired in this episode. IGN's Eric Goldman rated the episode a 7.8/10, he stated that it was "...not as tightly constructed as the pilot, "Crocodile" still was solid and Michael C. Hall's performance as Dexter continues to be a wonderful one, deftly portraying all of the aspects of this complicated (to say the least) man, who has some unbelievable darkness hiding underneath his friendly exterior. And kudos to the excellent opening credits sequence, which consists of shots of Dexter going about several mundane activities that are made unsettling due to our knowledge that he's a serial killer".

TVSquad's Jonathon Toomey praised the episode writing that it had done a good job at establishing the universe of Dexter and had done a great job at depicting serial killers.

The review from Den of Geek was considerably worse however, with Sarah Dobbs summing up the episode by saying "Dexter goes on a double date, eats some doughnuts, and, oh yeah, kills some more people. Meanwhile, the writers go batshit insane and rattle through a million and one ideas at once."

For his work on the episode, writer Clyde Phillips was nominated for the Edgar Allan Poe Award for Best Episode in a TV Series. Phillips lost to Matthew Graham, writer of the Life on Mars pilot.
