= Seeing Red (Dexter) =

- Dexter episode
- Dexter Morgan (Michael C. Hall) having a panic attack outside a crime scene after having a traumatic flashback to his childhood.
- Episode no.: Season 1 Episode 10
- Directed by: Michael Cuesta
- Written by: Kevin R. Maynard
- Production code: 110
- Original air date: December 3, 2006

Guest appearances
- Geoff Pierson as Tom Matthews; C. S. Lee as Vince Masuka; Mark Pellegrino as Paul Bennett; Christian Camargo as Rudy Cooper; Malcolm-Jamal Warner as Rita's lawyer; Tomiko Martinez as Monique; Ruth Zalduondo as Social worker; Maxwell Huckabee as Three-Year-Old Dexter Morgan; Katherine Kirkpatrick as Laura Moser; Christina Robinson as Astor Bennett; Daniel Goldman as Cody Bennett; Christine Barger as Pierced Chick; Roxanne Beckford as Reporter Candice DeSallee; Romeo Brown as Andy; Robert Della Cerra as Evidence Room Cop; Del Hunter-White as Court Supervisor; Teddy Lane Jr. as Jerry; Wiley Pickett as Sheriff; Jennifer Shon as Young Clerk; Symba Smith as Sexy Woman

Episode chronology
← Previous "Father Knows Best"	Next → "Truth Be Told"
- Dexter (season 1)

"Seeing Red" is the tenth episode of the first season of the American television drama series Dexter, which first aired on December 3, 2006 on Showtime in the United States. The episode was written by Kevin R. Maynard and was directed by Michael Cuesta. In the episode, the Miami Metro Homicide Department team investigate a blood-soaked crime scene, where blood spatter analyst Dexter Morgan (Michael C. Hall) is confronted by a repressed memory of a traumatic incident from his childhood. Meanwhile, Dexter's girlfriend Rita Bennett (Julie Benz) is charged with assaulting her ex-husband Paul Bennett (Mark Pellegrino) and risks losing custody of their children, while Det. Angel Batista (David Zayas) investigates a hunch that the Ice Truck Killer has an amputee fetish.

Scenes for "Seeing Red" were shot at several locations around Long Beach, California. Particular attention was paid to the cinematography and filming of the sequence of Dexter's flashbacks to make them feel like "fragments of memory". The episode received positive reviews from critics, with particular mention made to the scene in which Dexter hits Rita's ex-husband, Paul, in the head with a frying pan because of his threats about the lengths he will go to in order to protect his children.

== Plot ==
When a key to a hotel room is delivered to Miami police inside a jar of blood, Debra and Doakes visit the hotel and find a room completely covered in blood. Dexter is sent in first to investigate, but seeing the blood-covered room brings back a repressed memory from his childhood—sitting in a pool of blood at the age of three—causing him to run from the scene. The forensics team surmises that the blood came from at least five different bodies, although none are in the room. Since there was only one set of footprints in the room, they assumed that the victims were killed elsewhere and their blood spread around the room by the killer. Debra suggests that the Ice Truck Killer, who has had five bloodless victims, may have been responsible.

While dating a woman in a bar, Batista sees a prostitute with a prosthetic hand and fingernails painted in the same way as the Ice Truck Killer's first victim. Working on a hunch that the killer is an acrotomophiliac, he speaks to Debra's boyfriend Rudy, whom he doesn't realize is the actual Ice Truck Killer. Rudy cooperates upon realizing that Batista does not know his identity. Later, Batista is stabbed in a parking lot by a masked man; he manages to elbow him in the face before two men scare the attacker off. Minutes later, Rudy—who had earlier fallen out with Debra due to secretly having dinner with Dexter—arrives with flowers. They kiss, but Rudy backs away, complaining of a cut lip.

Rita finds out that Paul is pressing charges against her for assault. She talks with a lawyer, who tells her that since she invited Paul into her house, she cannot prove that her intent was to defuse the situation. At a hearing, it is revealed that Rita violated her and Paul's custody agreement, making his case against her even more substantial. When Paul drops by Rita's house to return their children, he threatens Dexter when the two are alone in the kitchen. Dexter responds by hitting him with a frying pan. Paul loses consciousness, so Dexter drives him back to his hotel and frames him for drug abuse. Dexter alerts the police, and Paul is sent back to prison. With encouragement from Rudy, Dexter returns to the bloody hotel room, where he relives his repressed memory: the murder of his mother with a chainsaw when he was three.

== Production ==
Since Dexter's producers try to shield the child actors as much as possible from the show's dark subject matter, executive producer Daniel Cerone urged the mother of his son's friend not to let her son audition to play a young Dexter, who is filmed sitting in a pool of blood. Erik King found the shot of the boy crying in the blood to be the creepiest moment of the first season. He described it as "very uncomfortable to watch, even when you know it's not real and you know these kids are actors." Cinematographer Romeo Tirone tightened the camera's shutter angle when filming these scenes to make them "feel like fragments of memory - subjective, with tight close-ups against an indistinct background. You don't see all the details of the environment." Series director Keith Gordon found these flashbacks "incredible" because he thought they were "like a Stanley Kubrick movie".

Several scenes from the episode were filmed on September 28, 2006 with a crew of 200 people in Long Beach, California at the Seaport Marina Hotel, along the Pacific Coast Highway, and on San Anseline Avenue. The Seaport Marina Hotel was used as the setting for Paul's motel, while a house on San Anseline Avenue was used as Rita's house.

== Reception ==
The episode received positive reviews from critics. Eric Goldman of IGN reviewed "Seeing Red" warmly and gave the episode an "Outstanding" rating of 9.0/10. He thought that the scene wherein Dexter hits Paul was "one of the most jaw-dropping, intense scenes yet", and he liked that Angel's "seeming separate" subplot was well-linked to the main plotline of the episode. He noted the "fascinating dynamic" between Dexter and Rudy, sensing "interesting psycho-sexual undercurrents" developing. TV Guide's Paula Paige felt that "Seeing Red" proved that each episode of Dexter was a constant improvement on the last. She enjoyed Dexter's manipulation by Rudy and found his solution to Paul's threats "perfect". Jonathan Toomey of TV Squad wrote that he was "in awe" of the episode. He was particularly impressed with Dexter's choice to frame Paul rather than kill him, and a minor storyline involving Lt. María LaGuerta (Lauren Vélez) and her betrayal of her superior, Capt. Tom Matthews (Geoff Pierson).
