= Return to Sender (Dexter) =

- Dexter episode
- Dexter Morgan (Michael C. Hall) finds Valerie Castillo's (Valerie Dillman) body at a crime scene, where Debra Morgan (Jennifer Carpenter) and James Doakes (Erik King) is present, despite dumping it in the ocean in the previous episode.
- Episode no.: Season 1 Episode 6
- Directed by: Tony Goldwyn
- Written by: Timothy Schlattmann
- Production code: 106
- Original air date: November 5, 2006

Guest appearances
- Valerie Dillman as Valerie Castillo; Vernee Watson-Johnson as Doakes' Mother; Andi Chapman as Social worker; José Zúñiga as Jorge Castillo; Gabriel Cordell as Sketch Artist; Julie Dolan as Cindy Landon; Cesar Flores as Oscar; Minerva Garcia as Mariel; Christina Robinson as Astor Bennett; Daniel Goldman as Cody Bennett; Devon Graye as Teenage Dexter Morgan; Demetrius Grosse as Alex Timmons; Lynn A. Henderson as Roni; Benton Jennings as Gene Marshall; Haley King as Teenage Debra Morgan; Denver Dowridge as Police Cadet; Kelli Kirkland as Jess; Damian T. Raven as Forbes; Gabriel Salvador as Roberto

Episode chronology
← Previous "Love American Style"	Next → "Circle of Friends"
- Dexter (season 1)

"Return to Sender" is the sixth episode of the first season of the American television drama series Dexter, which first aired on November 5, 2006, on Showtime in the United States. The episode was written by Timothy Schlattmann and was directed by Tony Goldwyn. In the episode, Dexter Morgan (Michael C. Hall) investigates a murder scene where one of his own victims has returned after he disposed of the body. Meanwhile, his girlfriend Rita Bennett (Julie Benz) tries to prevent her husband Paul from attending their daughter's birthday party, and Lt. María LaGuerta (Lauren Vélez) considers adopting a young witness of the murder whom she finds at the crime scene.

Though set in Miami, Florida, the episode was filmed at various locations in and around Los Angeles, California including a salvage yard, a field by Tujunga Wash and a waterfront house on Hibiscus Island. Goldwyn, who Erik King said was "a joy to work with", allowed actor C. S. Lee to improvise and David Zayas to memorize his Spanish lines in English and translate them mentally during each take. "Return to Sender" received generally positive reviews from critics.

It is revealed that Dexter uses the name “Patrick Bateman M.D.” as a pseudonym to buy M99, a reference to the main character of American Psycho.

== Plot ==
While eating breakfast with Rita, Dexter is called to a crime scene, only to discover that it is the salvage yard where he committed a double murder the previous night. He finds Valerie Castillo's body lying in the Airstream trailer where he killed her and her husband Jorge, despite having thrown the corpses into the ocean. He deduces that the Ice Truck Killer retrieved and planted the body. LaGuerta, Doakes, and Debra discover a young Cuban boy, Oscar, who claims to have seen somebody take Valerie into the trailer. Dexter begins to fear discovery, and has a nightmare of Debra being a serial killer with a modus operandi similar to his own.

As the investigation proceeds, Dexter attempts to discredit each of his colleagues' leads on the case. When Debra asks him to read her report on the killer, profiling a man sharing many of Dexter's characteristics, he second-guesses her theory. Worried about coming under suspicion, he throws his knives into the ocean. However, while looking at the blood drops from his victims, he notices that Valerie's slide has a happy face etched into her sample. Dexter realizes that this is a hint from the Ice Truck Killer, leading him to go to the salvage yard and plant Jorge's fingerprints and a knife bearing a dry drop of Valerie's blood for Doakes' men to find. After successfully framing Jorge for Valerie's murder, Dexter discovers that Oscar's description of the man who "saved" him from Valerie is in fact Jesus Christ.

Meanwhile, Rita learns that her abusive husband Paul has been released from prison, and she forbids him from attending their daughter Astor's birthday party. Doakes takes Debra to dinner with his mother and sisters, while LaGuerta bonds with Oscar and considers adopting him until his uncle arrives to take him home. In flashbacks, a teenaged Debra pleads with her father Harry to bring her on his and Dexter's hunting trips. When Harry forbids her from joining them, she steals his gun and practices shooting cans by herself. Later, Debra lashes out at Dexter in jealousy of the time that he spends time alone with their father.

== Production ==
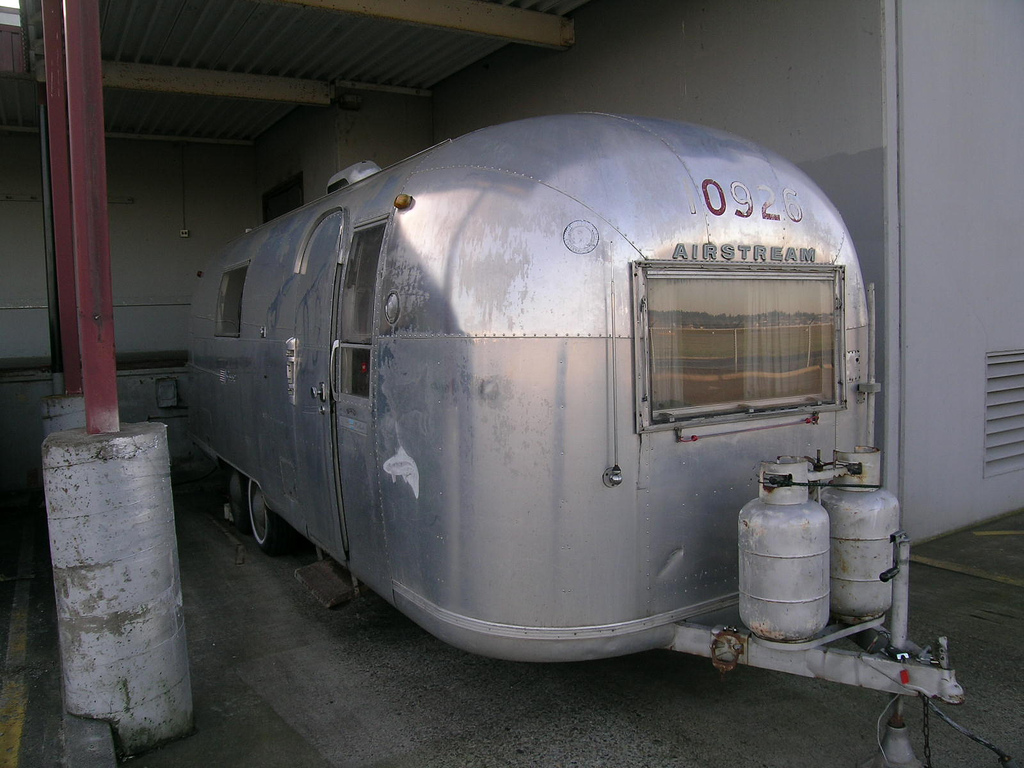
The salvage yard's Airstream trailer was shot both on location and on a sound stage.

The day of filming in the salvage yard, which took place at LA Japanese Auto Parts in Sun Valley, California, was abnormally hot according to Lauren Vélez. The Airstream trailer in which Dexter's victim is found was brought into the salvage yard for filming externally, but was assembled on a studio sound stage for shooting scenes inside the trailer. Erik King remarked that the trailer was dirty, odorous and humid—"all the things we needed it to be". Other filming locations included a waterfront house on Hibiscus Island in Biscayne Bay, Florida as the Castillos' home, an empty field next to Sun Valley's Tujunga Wash where a young Debra practices shooting with Harry's pistol, and a house in a residential neighborhood of Long Beach, California which stands in for Dexter's childhood home.

King said that Tony Goldwyn was "a joy to work with", while Vélez called him "an absolute actors' director". Shooting a scene in which Det. Angel Batista converses with a witness entirely in Spanish, David Zayas did not feel confident to memorize all of his Spanish lines. Instead, he learned his lines in English and translated the dialogue mentally during each take. In a scene between Dexter and Vince Masuka (C.S. Lee), Masuka pauses after examining a corpse and says, "I'm hungry." Michael C. Hall said that "C.S. [Lee's] ad libs are different every time. When he said, 'I'm hungry,' that was the only take that I didn't laugh." When asked about improvising on the show, Lee said that the writers "come up with some good lines themselves. [...] So I pretty much leave it up to them."

== Reception ==
"Return to Sender" was generally praised by critics. Eric Goldman of IGN wrote that the episode's "most interesting facet" was its flashbacks to Dexter's youth from Debra's perspective, though he felt that the young Debra's hasty apology to Dexter after insulting him was "a slightly cheesy moment". He thought that LaGuerta's bonding with Oscar "was okay, but [the storyline] fell a little flat". TV Guide's Paula Paige "love[d]" the episode, saying that "It just keeps getting better and better", but was unsure "what Deb having dinner with the Doakes' family has to do with anything". Writing for TV Squad, Jonathan Toomey opened his review of "Return to Sender" by saying, "Dexter did it again. Wowed me. Amazed me. Edge of my seat for the whole hour." He was amused that Debra's profile of Valerie's murderer matched Dexter, but was uninterested in Rita's storyline with her husband.

Both Malene Arpe of the Toronto Star and Daniel Fienberg of Zap2it were disappointed with the episode's audio commentary featuring Jennifer Carpenter, Erik King, Lauren Vélez and David Zayas on the first season DVD.
