= Shrink Wrap (Dexter) =

- Dexter episode
- Rudy Cooper (Christian Camargo) revealed as the Ice Truck Killer.
- Episode no.: Season 1 Episode 8
- Directed by: Tony Goldwyn
- Written by: Lauren Gussis
- Cinematography by: Romeo Tirone
- Editing by: Scott Wallace
- Original release date: November 19, 2006
- Running time: 53 minutes

Guest appearances
- Geoff Pierson as Thomas Matthews; C. S. Lee as Vince Masuka; Mark Pellegrino as Paul Bennett; Christian Camargo as Rudy Cooper; Sam Witwer as Neil Perry; Tony Goldwyn as Dr. Emmett Meridian; Mark Matkevich as Alex Gayle; Milauna Jackson as Co-Ed; Kyle Lupo as Scott Solomon

Episode chronology
| ← Previous "Circle of Friends" | Next → "Father Knows Best" |
- Dexter season 1

"Shrink Wrap" is the eighth episode of the first season of the American crime drama television series Dexter. The episode was written by Lauren Gussis, and directed by Tony Goldwyn, with the latter guest starring in the episode. It originally aired on Showtime on November 19, 2006.

Set in Miami, the series centers on Dexter Morgan, a forensic technician specializing in bloodstain pattern analysis for the fictional Miami Metro Police Department, who leads a secret parallel life as a vigilante serial killer, hunting down murderers who have not been adequately punished by the justice system due to corruption or legal technicalities. In the episode, Dexter investigates a therapist after three of his patients suspiciously die by suicide. Meanwhile, LaGuerta is skeptical over Perry's confession, while Debra continues her relationship with Rudy.

According to Nielsen Media Research, the episode was seen by an estimated 0.57 million household viewers and gained a 0.2 ratings share among adults aged 18–49. The episode received highly positive reviews from critics, who praised the revelation of the Ice Truck Killer.

== Plot ==
Dexter (Michael C. Hall) and Batista (David Zayas) investigate a woman, who is suspected of committing suicide. Miami Metro connects the death to two previous suicides, suggesting a pattern. Matthews (Geoff Pierson) commemorates the arrest of the Ice Truck Killer, but LaGuerta (Lauren Vélez) is still not convinced that Perry (Sam Witwer) is the killer.

Dexter finds that the three women were patients of a therapist, Dr. Emmett Meridian (Tony Goldwyn). Dexter checks in as a patient, using the opportunity to check his notes. However, Meridian has an alibi, as he had appointments during the time of the deaths. During a second appointment, Dexter notices that he has a camera recording the meetings. He later sneaks in and watches the women's recordings, finding that he cut their medication supply and motivated them into suicide.

Nevertheless, Dexter uses the opportunity to open up about his childhood and antisocial problems. Meridian gets him to remember a memory where he felt weak, and Dexter reminisces over a time he was unable to stand up to a bully. While Harry (James Remar) was proud that he did not retaliate, Dexter was haunted by the memory.

Paul (Mark Pellegrino) is allowed regular visits with Astor and Cody under the supervision of Rita (Julie Benz) and a social worker. While hesitant about his presence, Rita cancels a date with Dexter to have a family day with Paul and her children. She tries to make up by having sex with Dexter, but Dexter is too distracted by Meridian that he turns her down. He takes another appointment, where he relates how he almost lost control by almost killing his bully, until Harry stopped him. Dexter leaves the session after recalling his mother's death. Afterward, he visits Rita, and they have sex for the first time. Dexter talks about this to Meridian, while also revealing that he is a serial killer. He then kidnaps Meridian and kills him.

Perry offers to give information if he gets a reporter. LaGuerta unsuccessfully tries to trick him, but she discovers that he is aware of all the officers after hacking into the department's database. To get his confession, LaGuerta shows him one of the victims' severed heads. Perry is disturbed by the head, leading LaGuerta to conclude he is not the Ice Truck Killer. Dexter also keeps in touch with the Ice Truck Killer by sending coded messages through Craigslist. Debra (Jennifer Carpenter) continues her relationship with Rudy (Christian Camargo), growing confident that she might look at a serious future with him. At his apartment, Rudy checks into Craigslist, and responds to Dexter's message, revealing himself to be the Ice Truck Killer.

== Production ==
=== Development ===
The episode was written by Lauren Gussis, and directed by Tony Goldwyn. This was Gussis' first writing credit, and Goldwyn's second directing credit.

== Reception ==
=== Viewers ===
In its original American broadcast, "Shrink Wrap" was seen by an estimated 0.57 million household viewers with a 0.2 in the 18–49 demographics. This means that 0.2 percent of all households with televisions watched the episode. This was a slight decrease in viewership from the previous episode, which was watched by an estimated 0.61 million household viewers with a 0.3 in the 18–49 demographics.

A censored version of the episode was broadcast on CBS on April 6, 2008. It was seen by an estimated 7.03 million household viewers with a 2.1/5 in the 18–49 demographics.

=== Critical reviews ===
"Shrink Wrap" received highly positive reviews from critics. Eric Goldman of IGN gave the episode a "great" 8.8 out of 10, and wrote, "With four episodes to go this season, Dexter has gone against the grain now by not saving the reveal of the killer's identity for the final episode. In fact, one of the reasons it seemed Rudy wasn't going to be the killer was because it was perhaps a bit too obvious something was up to save a twist with him for the end and have it be satisfying. But by giving us all the information now, it changes the dynamic, because the conclusion will not be all aimed around the reveal but rather how it happens and how it affects the characters."

Paula Paige of TV Guide wrote, "Here's what I don't get. The ITK actually kills his victims, slices them apart and then drains their blood, so why make casts of Deb's legs? Not that she doesn't have some lovely gams, but what's he going to do with them, practice? He had containers of blood in the cold storage. I am confused. Someone, please explain."

Jonathan Toomey of TV Squad wrote, "Despite the fact that I think pretty much everyone was sharing the same hunch about who the real Ice Truck Killer is, how cool was that final scene? I'm so pumped for the rest of this season now." Television Without Pity gave the episode a "B+" grade.

Lauren Vélez submitted this episode for consideration for Outstanding Supporting Actress in a Drama Series, while Tony Goldwyn submitted it for Outstanding Guest Actor in a Drama Series at the 59th Primetime Emmy Awards.
