= Truth Be Told (Dexter) =

- Dexter episode
- Rudy Cooper (Christian Camargo) proposing to Debra Morgan (Jennifer Carpenter)
- Episode no.: Season 1 Episode 11
- Directed by: Keith Gordon
- Written by: Drew Z. Greenberg; Tim Schlattmann
- Cinematography by: Romeo Tirone
- Editing by: Scott Wallace
- Original release date: December 10, 2006
- Running time: 54 minutes

Guest appearances
- Geoff Pierson as Tom Matthews; C. S. Lee as Vince Masuka; Mark Pellegrino as Paul Bennett; Christian Camargo as Rudy Cooper; Margo Martindale as Camilla Figg; Tomiko Martinez as Monique; Angela Alvarado as Nina Batista; Debbie Lee Carrington as Patty

Episode chronology
← Previous "Seeing Red"	Next → "Born Free"
- Dexter season 1

"Truth Be Told" is the eleventh episode of the first season of the American crime drama television series Dexter. The episode was written by producer Drew Z. Greenberg and Tim Schlattmann, and directed by Keith Gordon. It originally aired on Showtime on December 10, 2006.

Set in Miami, the series centers on Dexter Morgan, a forensic technician specializing in bloodstain pattern analysis for the fictional Miami Metro Police Department, who leads a secret parallel life as a vigilante serial killer, hunting down murderers who have not been adequately punished by the justice system due to corruption or legal technicalities. In the episode, Dexter finds a connection to Ice Truck Killer through his past, while Rudy proposes to Debra.

According to Nielsen Media Research, the episode was seen by an estimated 0.76 million household viewers and gained a 0.4 ratings share among adults aged 18–49. The episode received critical acclaim, who praised the performances, revelations and writing.

== Plot ==
Rudy tracks down and kills the amputee prostitute who talked to Angel, so she can't spread the news leaving her dismembered remains in a public Christmas display. Dexter finds he is connected to the Ice Truck Killer, linking him to a bloody 1973 case that Harry investigated involving Dexter's biological mother. While researching newspaper articles from when he was a boy, he comes across the date of October 3, or 103, the number laced throughout the crime scene. Meanwhile, Captain Matthews has LaGuerta replaced for failing to find the Ice Truck Killer. Rita decides to take Astor and Cody to visit Paul in prison.

Rudy convinces Debra to join him on his rented boat, where he proposes to her. However, he then reveals himself as the Ice Truck Killer and chokes her unconscious. Dexter begins to suspect Rudy due to Angel mentioning that he punched his attacker and finding out that there was a blood stain on his collar that was not consistent with his stab wound. Dexter compares a sample from the shirt to a blood sample from a piece of cotton wool in Rudy's trash, confirming the match. He tries to contact Debra to alert her of the danger she is in, but she is already tied up on Rudy's boat.

== Production ==
=== Development ===
The episode was written by producer Drew Z. Greenberg and Tim Schlattmann, and directed by Keith Gordon. This was Greenberg's second writing credit, Schlattmann's second writing credit, and Gordon's first directing credit.

== Reception ==
=== Viewers ===
In its original American broadcast, "Truth Be Told" was seen by an estimated 0.76 million household viewers with a 0.4 in the 18–49 demographics. This means that 0.4 percent of all households with televisions watched the episode. This was a slight decrease in viewership from the previous episode, which was watched by an estimated 0.79 million household viewers with a 0.4 in the 18–49 demographics.

A censored version of the episode was broadcast on CBS on May 4, 2008. It was seen by an estimated 6.34 million household viewers with a 2.2 in the 18–49 demographics.

=== Critical reviews ===
"Truth Be Told" received critical acclaim. Eric Goldman of IGN gave the episode an "amazing" 9.2 out of 10, and wrote, "Dexter is hurtling towards the season finale, and this episode raised all the stakes, as both Dexter and Deb found out Rudy was The Ice Truck Killer, at the worst possible time."

Paula Paige of TV Guide wrote, "They did a fantastic job unraveling the mystery on this week's show; I can hardly wait until next Sunday. The lovely Christmas theme and the gifts the ITK left for Dexter and the gang were really thoughtful, and so beautifully wrapped."

Jonathan Toomey of TV Squad wrote, "Oh. My. God. This may very well have been a perfect hour of television. Could this show possibly be any better? Frankly, I have no idea how I'm going to spend my Sunday nights after next week's season finale." Television Without Pity gave the episode an "A" grade.

Julie Benz and Jennifer Carpenter submitted this episode for consideration for Outstanding Supporting Actress in a Drama Series at the 59th Primetime Emmy Awards.
