= Father Knows Best (Dexter) =

- Dexter episode
- Debra Morgan (Jennifer Carpenter) introduces Rudy Cooper (Christian Camargo) to Dexter Morgan (Michael C. Hall) for the first time.
- Episode no.: Season 1 Episode 9
- Directed by: Adam Davidson
- Written by: Melissa Rosenberg
- Cinematography by: Romeo Tirone
- Editing by: Elena Maganini
- Original release date: November 26, 2006
- Running time: 55 minutes

Guest appearances
- C. S. Lee as Vince Masuka; Christian Camargo as Rudy Cooper; Mark Pellegrino as Paul Bennett; Dominic Janes as Young Dexter; Dakin Matthews as Dr. Pittman; Joseph Lyle Taylor as Sergeant McKay; Jeanette Miller as Elderly Neighbor

Episode chronology
| ← Previous "Shrink Wrap" | Next → "Seeing Red" |
- Dexter season 1

"Father Knows Best" is the ninth episode of the first season of the American crime drama television series Dexter. The episode was written by Melissa Rosenberg, and directed by Adam Davidson. It originally aired on Showtime on November 26, 2006.

Set in Miami, the series centers on Dexter Morgan, a forensic technician specializing in bloodstain pattern analysis for the fictional Miami Metro Police Department, who leads a secret parallel life as a vigilante serial killer, hunting down murderers who have not been adequately punished by the justice system due to corruption or legal technicalities. In the episode, Dexter finds that his biological father left him his house, and drives there to pick up belongings. Meanwhile, Paul begins to slide back into his old abusive habits.

According to Nielsen Media Research, the episode was seen by an estimated 0.76 million household viewers and gained a 0.4 ratings share among adults aged 18–49. The episode received highly positive reviews from critics, who praised the writing, performances and suspense.

== Plot ==
Dexter learns that Joe Driscoll, his biological father, who he assumed had been long dead, has only recently died and left all of his belongings to Dexter, including his house in Dade City. Dexter travels to the house with Rita. Later, Debra and Rudy – who, unbeknownst to her, is the Ice Truck Killer – arrive to assist Dexter in cleaning out the house. Dexter suspects Driscoll was murdered. Flashbacks to Dexter's childhood show him questioning his adoptive father, Harry, about his birth parents, learning that Driscoll had donated some of his blood to the young Dexter for surgery. Irma, Driscoll's elderly neighbor, recognizes Rudy as a cable repairman who happened to be Driscoll's last visitor before he died. After Rudy leaves the premises with Dexter and his family, he later returns to the elderly woman's house dressed as the cable repairman. Paul begins to slide back into his old abusive habits when Rita attempts to prevent him from seeing their children.

Back in Miami, Batista is questioned about a shooting incident involving Doakes, who claimed to have fired in self-defense. Dexter's analysis of the blood spatter evidence suggests that the suspect was not shot from where Doakes says he had shot him. Batista decides to report his actual observations, the forensic evidence, and the discrepancies with Doakes' story to Internal Affairs, even though this will brand him as a rat. It turns out that the man Doakes killed was a former Haitian terrorist militia member of the Tonton Macoute, whom he had encountered during a black ops mission overseas. In the end, the situation gets swept under the rug.

== Production ==
=== Development ===
The episode was written by Melissa Rosenberg, and directed by Adam Davidson. This was Rosenberg's second writing credit, and Davidson's first directing credit.

== Reception ==
=== Viewers ===
In its original American broadcast, "Father Knows Best" was seen by an estimated 0.76 million household viewers with a 0.4 in the 18–49 demographics. This means that 0.4 percent of all households with televisions watched the episode. This was a 33% increase in viewership from the previous episode, which was watched by an estimated 0.57 million household viewers with a 0.2 in the 18–49 demographics.

A censored version of the episode was broadcast on CBS on April 13, 2008. It was seen by an estimated 6.39 million household viewers with a 1.9/6 in the 18–49 demographics.

=== Critical reviews ===
"Father Knows Best" received highly positive reviews from critics. Eric Goldman of IGN gave the episode a "great" 8.2 out of 10, and wrote, "What is Rudy's ultimate goal with Dexter? Does he want to be caught and punished by him, or does he perhaps want them to join forces? Clearly they both perceive each other as kindred spirits, and it's hard to imagine their sick game coming to any kind of happy conclusion, to say the least."

Paula Paige of TV Guide wrote, "This show is so ridiculously fantastic, I don't even know where to start. So much happens in one episode, I need a week off in between just to process it all. The best line of the show: 'How did death turn into a couples weekend?'"

Jonathan Toomey of TV Squad wrote, "At this point I'm pretty convinced that it's impossible for this show to have a bad episode. In my opinion, this was probably the slowest episode of the season and it was still outstanding. I say "slow" because well... it was. It took the whole hour to reveal just a few tiny things that easily could have been cleared up in minutes. Not that these things weren't important. They are. It just felt a little drawn out to me." Television Without Pity gave the episode a "B+" grade.

Erik King submitted this episode for consideration for Outstanding Supporting Actor in a Drama Series at the 59th Primetime Emmy Awards.
