= Kid in a Candy Store (Dexter: Original Sin) =

- Dexter: Original Sin episode
- Episode no.: Episode 2
- Directed by: Michael Lehmann
- Written by: Katrina Mathewson; Tanner Bean
- Cinematography by: Edward J. Pei
- Editing by: Katie Ennis
- Original air date: December 20, 2024
- Running time: 46 minutes

Guest appearances
- Sarah Michelle Gellar as Tanya Martin (special guest star); Brittany Allen as Laura Moser; Raquel Justice as Sofia Rivera; Jeff Daniel Phillips as Levi Reed; Sarah Kinsey as Camilla Figg; Jasper Lewis as Doris Morgan; Aaron Jennings as Clark Sanders; Roberto Sanchez as Tony Ferrer; Eli Sherman as Young Dexter; Roby Attal as Brian Moser; Carlo Mendez as Hector Estrada

Episode chronology
| ← Previous "And in the Beginning..." | Next → "Miami Vice" |

"Kid in a Candy Store" is the second episode of the American crime drama mystery television series Dexter: Original Sin, prequel to Dexter. The episode was written by supervising producers Katrina Mathewson and Tanner Bean, and directed by executive producer Michael Lehmann. It was released on Paramount+ with Showtime on December 20, 2024, and airing on Showtime two days later.

The series explores a young Dexter Morgan, as he begins working as a forensic blood spatter analyst at the Miami Metro Police Department. It also explores his inner conflicts, wherein he begins his days as serial killer. In the episode, Dexter begins his first day at Miami Metro, struggling to fit in with the rest. Flashbacks depict Harry's attempts to arrest drug kingpin Hector Estrada and meeting Laura Moser to act as his informant.

The episode received mixed reviews from critics, with some criticizing the pacing and storylines, although Patrick Gibson received praise for his performance.

== Plot ==
Tanya (Sarah Michelle Gellar) and Masuka (Alex Shimizu) introduce Dexter (Patrick Gibson) to the forensics department in Miami Metro. At an unknown location, a masked man takes a kidnapped kid and locks him in a room.

Miami Metro is called to a homicide scene, with Dexter along to assist. Nevertheless, Dexter is only asked to bring coffee, and is mocked when he offers his hypothesis on the murder. Dexter tries to win over the squad, but his social awkwardness gets in the way. As a favor, Harry (Christian Slater) asks Batista (James Martinez) to take Dexter out for the night to help him. Harry also has to deal with Debra (Molly Brown), who is angry that her father is not willing to eat healthy food after his hospital stay.

In flashbacks, Spencer (Patrick Dempsey) and the squad are investigating drug kingpin Hector Estrada, hoping they can find a person who can infiltrate his gang for information. Later, Harry and his team bust a drug dealer, Joe Driscoll, along with his accomplice, Laura Moser (Brittany Allen). When Joe fails to cooperate, Harry approaches Laura and convinces her to become an informant in Estrada's gang, promising to let her go without any charges. He later takes her home, telling her he will protect her. He also meets Laura's children, Dexter and Brian.

Batista takes Dexter to a Cuban nightclub, teaching him how to dance. He explains that the club always pays tribute to a boy named Rene, a Cuban immigrant who came to Miami during the Mariel boatlift. He got involved with a loan shark named Tony Ferrer, and Ferrer killed Rene's mother for failing to pay in time. Dexter recognizes the mother as Carla Carballo, as he saw her crime scene photo in the file room. Batista also reveals that Rene killed himself at her gravesite out of guilt, leaving no witnesses to prosecute Ferrer. The following day, Dexter wins over the department by showing up with donuts, to Harry's delight. A severed finger is sent to Judge Powell and Miami Metro identifies it as belonging to Jimmy, Judge Powell's son and the kid who has been kidnapped. Spencer suggests the cartel might be involved. Dexter feels upset at the actions and considers pursuing the kidnapper, but decides to focus on tracking Ferrer instead.

== Production ==
=== Development ===
The episode was written by supervising producers Katrina Mathewson and Tanner Bean, and directed by executive producer Michael Lehmann. This was Mathewson's first writing credit, Bean's first writing credit, and Lehmann's second directing credit.

== Reception ==
"Kid in a Candy Store" received mixed reviews from critics. Louis Peitzman of Vulture gave the episode a 3 star rating out of 5 and wrote, "If you were worried this Dexter flashback series wouldn't have flashbacks within flashbacks, “Kid in a Candy Store” is here to set your mind at ease. Yes, even though Original Sin is supposedly told from present-day Dexter's near-death-experience perspective, we're already getting other characters' trips down memory lane, complete with the bad wigs we know and love. After the table-setting of the series premiere, it makes sense that the show would want to expand its world a bit — here's hoping it's careful not to collapse under its own weight so early in the run."

Callum Murray of Game Rant wrote, "His failed attempts are very amusing, but it eventually leads to a fitting nod to a classic Dexter trait, with the birth of his most iconic way of blending in with the crowd. Fans will not be disappointed with this, and the episode as a whole. Original Sin has a long way to go, but this episode increases expectations, and teases a very exciting season ahead."

Greg MacArthur of Screen Rant wrote, "Once Dexter locks eyes on his next target, a predatory loan shark responsible for the deaths of his own community members, the addictive and visceral core element of the original series starts to enter the fold. This main story development, along with the increasingly engaging Laura Moser flashbacks with an old-school Harry, starts to diminish any doubt that a Dexter prequel series without Hall in the spotlight couldn't work." Mads Misasi of Telltale TV gave the episode a 4 star rating out of 5 and wrote, "These flashbacks actually add to the story, allowing Dexter: Original Sin to flow more freely without getting too caught up in Dexter's floundering. The duality of Dexter and Harry actually helps to give more insight into why Harry acts the way he does with Dexter and establishes why Dexter is who he is."
