= Over There (American TV series) =

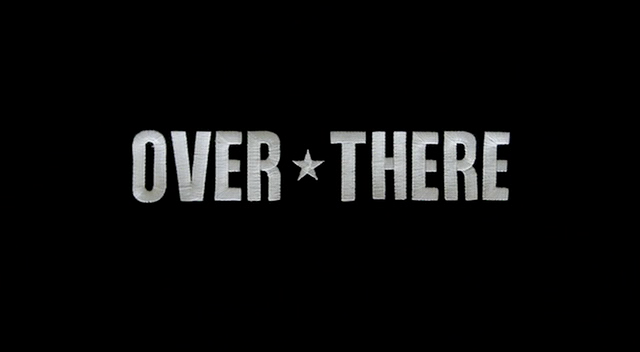
- Genre: Action; Drama; War
- Created by: Steven Bochco; Chris Gerolmo
- Starring: Josh Henderson; Luke Macfarlane; Erik Palladino; Keith Robinson; Kirk Jones; Omid Abtahi; Lizette Carrión; Nicki Lynn Aycox; Sprague Grayden; Brigid Brannagh; Lombardo Boyar; Jimmy "Jax" Pinchak
- Country of origin: United States
- Original language: English
- No. of seasons: 1
- No. of episodes: 13

Production
- Executive producer: Steven Bochco
- Running time: 43–46 minutes
- Production companies: Steven Bochco Productions; 20th Century Fox Television

Original release
- Network: FX
- Release: July 27 – October 26, 2005

Over There is an American action war drama television series co-created by Steven Bochco and Chris Gerolmo and produced by 20th Century Fox Television. It premiered in the United States on July 27, 2005, on FX and in Canada on September 6, 2005, on the History Television channel. The series was presented in 16:9 widescreen format in the United States and the United Kingdom, and mastered in high definition.

FX formally announced on November 1, 2005, that the show would not be returning due to declining ratings. The thirteenth and final episode of the series, "Follow the Money", aired in the United States on October 26, 2005.

== Background ==
The series followed a unit of the United States Army's 3rd Infantry Division on its first tour of duty in Iraq, and chronicled the war's effects on the soldiers' families in the United States. The Iraq sequences were filmed in the California desert, while the homefront scenes are shot in and around the Greater Los Angeles area.

The pilot was developed by Steven Bochco (who also created such acclaimed series as NYPD Blue, L.A. Law and Hill Street Blues). Originally, the show was to be produced by UPN, which subsequently decided that the prospects for international sales were not good and withdrew from the project. However, the series was seen around the world on pay cable channels in about 100 territories, according to Reuters.

The title of the series echoes "Over There", George M. Cohan's 1917 song about U.S. soldiers serving abroad during World War I. The theme song used for the series is Chris Gerolmo's "Over There".

The show (Bochco's first for basic cable) was the first scripted television series set in a current, ongoing military action involving the United States. In another unusual move, the pilot episode was released on DVD on August 2, 2005, less than a week after the show's premiere.

== Characters ==
=== Main ===
The cast of the pilot episode of Over There (left to right: Luke Macfarlane, Kirk Jones, Erik Palladino, Nicki Aycox, Lizette Carrión, Keith Robinson, Josh Henderson).

- PFC Bo "Texas" Rider, Jr. (Josh Henderson): A 20-year–old star quarterback who was awarded a partial scholarship to Texas A&M, but could not make up the financial shortfall and joined the Army so he could take advantage of the G.I. Bill once his enlistment is up. He was fixated on the nicknames all of his squad mates have and the stories behind them as he did not have his own nickname. He had a wife and young son whom he loved very much. At the end of the first episode, a truck containing Bo and PV2 Dumphy drove over a landmine. Bo received terrible injuries to his leg and it was amputated shortly afterwards. He later became determined to return to his unit to stop feeling helpless.
- PV2 Frank "Dim" Dumphy (Luke Macfarlane): In spite of (or, more likely, in reaction against) his well-to-do upbringing and Ivy League education, this 22-year-old Cornell graduate deliberately chose a blue-collar, lower-class lifestyle. He was tormented by intellectual conflicts over the actions he is ordered to carry out, and maddened with worry over his pregnant, alcoholic wife and emotionally disturbed 7-year-old stepson. He has never pursued a commission because he does not want to adopt a leadership role. His perspective serves as a contrast to emphasize the truly underprivileged roots of his squad mates. Probably the most sensitive character in the series, he was deeply disturbed when he learned that a particular insurgent sacrificed several men and a little girl in order to get past a check point. He lacked a degree of street smarts which "Smoke" possessed as he has shown on some occasions, and does not operate prudently under pressure. It is unclear as to why he is a Private when his B.S. gives him an automatic promotion to Specialist. He carries an M4 carbine like his squad-mates, although his is fitted with an M203 grenade launcher.
- SSG Chris "Scream" Silas (Erik Palladino): The battle-hardened veteran from Long Island, New York who was given charge of a group of new recruits who has no problem speaking his mind to his superiors. He was not happy about having been handed 90 days additional duty on the eve of returning home, but begins to like his squad more as his 90 days winds down. His nickname, "Scream", stems from the loud manner in which he gives orders.
- PV2 Avery "Angel" King (Keith Robinson): A gifted singer hailing from a small town in Arkansas, enlisted in a fit of anger at not making a competitive choir, a decision the 20-year–old devout Christian comes to regret. "Angel's" exceptional marksmanship skills made him the unit's Designated Marksman and his M4 having an ACOG mounted on it.
- PV2 Maurice "Smoke" Williams (Kirk "Sticky" Jones): A native of Compton, California was high during most of his twenty years. Although he was arguably the best in his squad, as evidenced by his street smarts, he had a strictly "us-or-them" attitude towards his white squad mates, but this attitude was lessened each time a white squad mate saves his life. He is irreligious as a rebellion against his mother, and much of his contempt directed toward "Angel". He serves as the squad's SAW gunner, carrying a compact "paratrooper" version of the M249 Squad Automatic Weapon.
- PFC Tariq Nassiri (Omid Abtahi): An Arab-American from Detroit who was assigned as a replacement for Bo. His extensive knowledge of Arabic and Middle Eastern customs saved the squad multiple times, acting as a middleman between the American soldiers and the local people. Tariq is college educated and sensitive to all involved. Like Dim, Tariq has a bachelor's degree, yet only held the rank of PFC.
- PFC Esmeralda "Doublewide" Del Rio (Lizette Carrión): A happily–married new mother, was also a resourceful, no-nonsense soldier. The 20-year–old displayed her whenever the subject of her "ample figure" comes up. She and "Mrs. B" are part of a logistics unit that supports the squad on their missions, be it providing resupply or transport via their M939 5-ton trucks, and also carries an M16A2 rifle instead of an M4 carbine like most of her comrades.
- PV2 Brenda "Mrs. B" Mitchell (Nicki Lynn Aycox): A "pig-headed" and obstinate 18-year-old, who was more of a liability than an asset to the squad, and to her partner, "Doublewide". She took great umbrage at the fact that her nickname is short for "Mrs. Bitch". As a teen, she was raped and later gave birth to an autistic child who was put into the custody of his grandparents. Hardships in life made her significantly more willing to risk her life under fire since she seemed to have nothing to lose. She is one of the few characters to carry an M16A2 rifle instead of an M4 carbine, due to her job as part of a support unit instead of a front-line combat unit like her comrades.
- Terry Rider (Sprague Grayden): Bo's wife who wanted her husband to stay at home after he lost his leg.
- Vanessa Dumphy (Brigid Brannagh): Frank's wife who ends up cheating on him in the first episode. Throughout the series she displays more and more dysfunction as a result of the lack of stability in their marital status. However, in the final few episodes of the series she attempts to get the marriage back on its feet.
- Sergio Del Rio (Lombardo Boyar): Esmeralda's husband who throughout the series comes close to cheating on his wife who is overseas while he is also taking care of their son.
- Eddy Dumphy (Jimmy "Jax" Pinchak): Frank's stepson who simply tried to survive life with his dysfunctional family.

=== Recurring ===
- Ana Ortiz: Anna
- Adam Storke: CPT John "Duke" Baron, the team's company commander
- J. Lamont Pope: LT "Mad Cow" Taylor (episodes 1–6), the team's first platoon leader
- Josh Stamberg: LT Alexander "Underpants" Hunter (episodes 7–13), the team's second platoon leader
- Lilly McDowell: Krista
- Kirk B.R. Woller: Dr. Muecke
- Rami Malek: Hassan, an Iraqi insurgent
- Mark-Paul Gosselaar: John Moffet, an American reporter
- Wade Williams: Bo Rider Sr., Bo's estranged father
- David Sullivan: Dr. McGlaglen
- Earl Poitier: Reggie

=== Guest appearances ===
- Michael Cudlitz: COL Ryan, an unconventional Army Special Forces officer
- Currie Graham: CPL Shaver, a burned-out medic with a death wish
- Matt Barr: Cracker
- Michael Patrick McGill: Father Feeney
- McKinley Freeman: MDPD Uniform

== Episodes ==
| No. | Title | Directed by | Written by | Original release date | Prod. code |
|---|---|---|---|---|---|
| 1 | "Pilot" | Chris Gerolmo | Story by : Chris Gerolmo & Steven Bochco; Teleplay by : Chris Gerolmo | July 27, 2005 | 1AKL79 |
A U.S. Army unit arrives in Iraq for their first tour of duty and quickly find themselves engaged in a bloody firefight. The squad emerges from the engagement essentially unscathed, though "Scream" and Lieutenant "Mad Cow" disagree over an interpretation of the squad's orders. A rash decision by Bo that jeopardized "Dim's" life gets him a serious chewing out from "Scream". When the soldiers go on a post-action "beer run", their truck contacts a buried improvised explosive device (IED) and Bo's right leg is blown off below the knee. "Dim's" wife, Vanessa, is shown to be cheating on him while he is away.
| 2 | "Roadblock Duty" | Nelson McCormick | Chris Gerolmo | August 3, 2005 | 1ALK01 |
Bo tries to cope with his loss of a limb and a visit from his estranged, alcoholic father. After a bridge is destroyed, the unit is assigned the task of manning a military checkpoint. "Dim" clashes with "Smoke" over his racist views. During their first night on duty, the team is forced to shoot a motorist who approaches the checkpoint with lights off and ignores their orders to stop; a second car is allowed to pass. An Arab-American soldier from Detroit, named Tariq Nassiri, joins the squad. An explosive device located within the disabled vehicle is remotely detonated. On the second night a car again approaches with no lights and is fired upon; in this instance, the second vehicle to arrive is searched (after its occupants attempt to flee and are killed) and a young male insurgent is found hiding in the trunk.
| 3 | "Prisoner" | Jesse Bochco | Joel Fields | August 10, 2005 | 1AKL02 |
The squad helps guard the insurgent prisoner, who is taken to a deserted town and undergoes both physical and mental stress at the hands of an intelligence officer to force him to reveal the location a shipment of stolen Stinger missiles. While in the town, the team must repel constant attacks by insurgents. In the hospital, Bo asks to have his morphine discontinued. Eddy finds himself alone when Vanessa fails to return home after spending the evening with her lover.
| 4 | "I Want My Toilets" | Mikael Salomon | Chris Gerolmo | August 17, 2005 | 1AKL03 |
"Angel's" rifle skills prove invaluable when a supply convoy must travel through a hot zone. Vanessa's emotional state worsens when she suffers a traumatic loss. Terry makes the house wheelchair accessible in anticipation of Bo's return home.
| 5 | "Embedded" | Nelson McCormick | Peter Egan | August 24, 2005 | 1AKL04 |
"Smoke" is implicated in the death of a civilian, and an embedded reporter disappears after suggesting the death was an Iraqi setup. "Doublewide" sustains an eye injury when she is struck by flying debris, and Bo receives a prosthetic leg and begins the painful process of learning how to walk again. "Smoke" gets news that his mother has suffered a serious stroke. Vanessa withholds information regarding her miscarriage from "Dim." The journalist, who has quit his post, is kidnapped by insurgents.
| 6 | "It's Alright Ma, I'm Only Bleeding" | Jesse Bochco | Chris Gerolmo & Peter Egan | August 31, 2005 | 1AKL05 |
The squad races to rescue journalist John Moffet before he is executed by his abductors, and in the process learns that a bounty has been placed on "Smoke's" life. "Mad Cow" is killed by an RPG round. Bo is discharged from the hospital and returns home. Vanessa is involved in a DUI traffic accident and leaves the scene; she is later confronted by MPs at her home who inform her that Eddy has been taken into protective custody in her absence. The squad makes video telephone calls to the States, wherein "Smoke" is able to speak with his mother and Vanessa tells "Dim" about the miscarriage and accident (though she lies about the circumstances regarding both). Moffet is beheaded and his captors are killed by gunfire just as the team attempts to effect his rescue.
| 7 | "Mission Accomplished" | D. J. Caruso | Chris Gerolmo | September 7, 2005 | 1AKL06 |
Bo takes his frustration over his physical limitations out on Terry. Lieutenant Alexander Hunter is assigned as a replacement for "Mad Cow" and informs SSG Silas that he will do whatever it takes to get "Smoke" out of his unit; he also expresses his disdain for the group's "idiotic" nicknames (he is subsequently nicknamed "Underpants" by the squad). After two close brushes with death, "Mrs. B" is granted a short leave to tend to her son, who has been diagnosed with autism; instead, she visits the boy's father in prison. After the encounter, she makes a drastic decision regarding her future in the Army by going AWOL and boarding a bus to Los Angeles. When the fire team assists Iraqi guards at a makeshift prison, the situation turns critical when a prisoner taped with explosives threatens to blow himself and everyone else at the prison up. Ignoring the pleas from his fellow prisoners, the zealot detonates his makeshift bomb.
| 8 | "Situation Normal" | Kim Manners | Adam Rodman & Chris Gerolmo | September 14, 2005 | 1AKL07 |
The squad is assigned to protect American workers constructing an oil pipeline in a remote village. The contractor offers to construct a building on behalf of the town when the Imam objects to the pipeline's construction. "Mrs. B" lands in Hollywood, falls in with an unsavory group, and is robbed. She is forced to steal food when she is unable to land a job, but after an act of kindness she seeks help returning home from a Marine Corps recruiter. Eddy is suspended from school due to behavioral issues, and Vanessa finally seeks out help with her drinking problem by joining Alcoholics Anonymous. After receiving a letter from the squad, Bo exerts himself and tries to run on his prosthetic leg. The unit's continuing presence in the Iraqi village proves to be a disruptive influence. When the pipeline contractor insists that the townspeople vote democratically as to whether a mosque or a school is to be built, the Imam's wife is declared to be an infidel; the group reacts violently, and begins to stone the woman, until the squad is forced to intervene. The contractor elects to route the pipeline away from the town, and the unit receives orders to move out, leaving the shamed woman to face an almost certain death.
| 9 | "Spoils of War" | Greg Yaitanes | Joel Fields | September 21, 2005 | 1AKL08 |
"Mrs. B" returns to the unit and is instructed to remain silent regarding her actions back home. Vanessa confesses to "Dim" about her affair, who naturally reacts with disgust. The squad is ordered to sweep for insurgents and takes refuge in a palatial home they unattended. They quickly find themselves under fire, and "Dim" is pinned down. "Mrs. B" drives a humvee through the wall the attackers had been using for cover, killing one of them; the other is taken prisoner. "Scream" chews "Mrs. B" out for her rash actions, then tells her he will nominate her for a Bronze Star. The captive, hoping to secure his freedom, reveals a cache of gold and American currency worth five million dollars, which he tells them is now theirs. The unit ponders what to do with the money, finally deciding to take $10,000 for "Mrs. B"'s sick child. Once the booty has been secured for transport, the Lieutenant orders the unit members searched for contraband; a Cuban cigar found in the sergeant's possession is confiscated, though none of the money is turned up. That evening, "Dim" hands "Smoke" an envelope with instructions to mail it to the States for the care of "Mrs. B"'s son. "Dim" and "Mrs. B" seek comfort in each other's arms. Bo is unhappy when he learns that he is to be medically discharged.
| 10 | "Suicide Rain" | Dean White | Salvatore J. Stabile | September 28, 2005 | 1AKL09 |
Several of the squad members receive disturbing news from home. While "Angel" assists another unit in handing out food at a local village, a woman hurls an explosive device into the supply truck, killing herself and killing and wounding a number of Army personnel and civilians. Lieutenant Hunter and Corporal Shaver (a burned-out medic with a death wish) clash over proper triage procedures—the lieutenant wants Americans treated first, regardless of medical need. PVT Dane, who sustained a minor head injury in the blast, wanders off and is taken hostage by a distraught man whose son was also injured; the man threatens to kill the soldier with his own M4A1 if his son's wounds are not tended to immediately. "Angel" and the medic are sent to treat the boy, with orders to kill the man if need be to secure the release of the hostage. CPL Shaver is forced to amputate the boy's right leg due to blood poisoning, and although at first the procedure appears to be successful, the youth soon goes into convulsions and dies. When the man threatens PVT Dane, CPL Shaver asks to be the one who is shot because "I'm the one who killed your son." "Angel" attempts to wrestle the weapon away from the man just as the team bursts in, and the man is brought down in a hail of automatic gunfire. Much to everyone's shock, they realize that PVT Dane was also killed in the assault by an errant round, whereupon CPL Shaver jams the barrel of a pistol into his mouth and commits suicide. Back home, Bo struggles to adapt to his new physical condition, Sergio's relationship with another Army spouse heats up, and Vanessa tries to make amends for her drinking.
| 11 | "Orphans" | Kramer Morgenthau | Joel Fields | October 5, 2005 | 1AKL10 |
CPT Baron tries unsuccessfully to convince SSG Silas to re-enlist. The fire team is ordered to evict the residents of an orphanage that has been designated as being needed for "public use." Upon arriving at the site, the unit destroys a box they believe to contain a bomb, only to find out that it actually housed a young boy's chess set. The incident angers a young French woman who runs the orphanage. "Scream" gives the boy his own chess set as a replacement, and "Dim" accepts the boy's challenge to a game. Stateside, Terry discovers that Bo's father has been cashing his military paychecks. A suicide car bomb damages the orphanage building and kills the young chess player. "Scream" and the orphanage director begin to develop feelings for one another, and spend the night together. "Smoke" offers to play "Dim" in a game of chess, and (much to "Dim's" surprise) wins. "Scream" agrees to renew his enlistment under the condition that the Army makes proper provisions for the orphans. He informs his paramour of the arrangement, and tells her that it would be better for her, and the orphans, if the Army weren't around for a while (himself included). Sergio feels increasingly conflicted over his attraction to Anna. Bo drives to Abilene, over Terry's objections, to confront his father.
| 12 | "Weapons of Mass Destruction" | Jesse Bochco | Chris Gerolmo | October 19, 2005 | 1AKL11 |
The fire team is burdened with the task of training a group of inexperienced Iraqi soldiers, then must put their lives in the men's hands as they search for an elusive, well-financed bomber. Bo confronts his father over the theft of his paychecks and ends up beating him into unconsciousness when the man attacks him. Vanessa experiences increasing difficulty staying "on the wagon." When "Doublewide" calls home to Sergio, she senses that something is wrong in his demeanor. Lieutenant Hunter arrives, seemingly on a mission to make things more difficult for the squad. After commandeering the Sergeant's tent, he makes it known that he wants to be intimately involved with all aspects of the search, the underlying message being that he wants the credit should the bomber be apprehended. He and "Scream" clash when the lieutenant fires into the darkness after seeing "someone running" (not taking into consideration that there are U.S. soldiers on sentry duty standing watch just outside the camp), and again over that best tact to take while questioning a detainee. One of the sharper Iraqi trainees makes an astute observation during the house-to-house search and convinces the team to return to the residence after nightfall. The lieutenant storms angrily onto the scene just as "Scream" gives the order to advance, and the bomber pops out of his hiding place and hurls a hand grenade at the group. Though no one is injured, the explosion gives the bomber a chance to flee; as "Angel," Tariq, the Lieutenant, and "Scream" pursue the suspect, "Scream" deliberately interferes with "Underpants" aim, allowing "Angel" and "Tariq" to take down the insurgent, after which "Scream" sarcastically congratulates the lieutenant for the kill. Sergio and Anna's plans to consummate their relationship are interrupted when Army messengers arrive with the news that Anna's husband, Enrique, has been killed in action.
| 13 | "Follow the Money" | Chris Gerolmo | Chris Gerolmo & Steven Bochco | October 26, 2005 | 1AKL12 |
Bo returns from Abilene and questions his ability to be a proper father, though Terry reassures him he is. "Dim" receives a video email from Vanessa apologizing for all of her past transgressions. After Lieutenant "Underpants" leads the fire team into an ambush, "Scream" asks Captain Baron (whose nickname, we find out, is "The Duke") to reassign the lieutenant. It is also revealed that the nickname "Underpants" comes from the lieutenant's apparent predilection for wearing red Calvin Klein briefs. "Angel" turns 21. Anna informs Sergio that she is moving back home with her mother, after which he leaves "Doublewide" a tear-filled voice mail message. Later, while leading a convoy of civilian vehicles, "Doublewide" is ordered to run down a young boy who is signaling the column to stop; when she steadfastly refuses, the lieutenant machine-guns the child out of fear of being ambushed. At the local track, Bo encounters another amputee who has overcome his disability and offers to help Bo stay in the Army. When Bo officially receives his Purple Heart, he is surprised to learn that he has also been awarded the Bronze Star (along with the "V" device) in recognition of his courageous actions. Back on the War front, when several convoy vehicles are hit by RPG fire, the lieutenant orders the squad to stop and fight off the insurgent attack. "Smoke" saves "Dim's" life after he was forced to engage one of the attackers in hand-to-hand combat, and Tariq is struck by an insurgent bullet from a Lee–Enfield but is saved from injury by his body armor. "Underpants'" reckless actions in trying to "take back" a panel truck results in the death of four soldiers. When "Dim" realizes that the Lieutenant's goal was to protect the "money truck" (containing 340 million Iraqi dinars), he berates the lieutenant for his callous attitude. Just as the lieutenant orders "Scream" to arrest "Dim" for insubordination, the truck is struck by another RPG round and explodes. When the smoke and dust clears, the lieutenant is lying face down in a pool of blood, shot through the back by "friendly fire." Afterward, as the squad members enjoy a beer around a camp fire and try to make sense of the day's events, "Scream" tells them to "...tell it to your shrink in a couple years. The lucky ones live to feel guilty."

== Reception ==
The show's critics complained that the show "bends over backward not to express any opinion whatsoever about the conflict." Also, given the show's subject matter, it is not surprising that some criticized it as one of the most graphically–violent television programs ever. Accordingly, the program was tagged with the television rating TV-MA for language and violence, and warning notices such as "VIEWER DISCRETION ADVISED." FX advertised the show as being "...TV's most controversial series."

- TV series Over There dramatizes Iraq war article from the July 22, 2005 edition of the Christian Science Monitor.
- "Fighting the Good fight" article from the July 25, 2005 edition of Newsweek.
- "Over There brings the Iraq war home" article from the July 26, 2005 issue of USA Today.
- "Over There – Hollywood Joins the War Party" article edited on July 29, 2005 by Antiwar.com.
- "There's Over There—and there's the real thing" article from the August 30, 2005 issue of the San Francisco Chronicle.

== Home media ==
In an unusual move, the pilot episode of the series was released on DVD on August 2, 2005, less than a week after the series's premiere. The complete series was released on DVD in the United States and Canada on March 21, 2006.
