= And in the Beginning... =

- Dexter: Original Sin episode
- Dexter Morgan (Patrick Gibson) with his father Harry (Christian Slater) on his first day of work at Miami Metro.
- Episode no.: Episode 1
- Directed by: Michael Lehmann
- Written by: Clyde Phillips
- Cinematography by: Edward J. Pei
- Editing by: Perri Frank
- Original air date: December 13, 2024
- Running time: 50 minutes

Guest appearances
- Sarah Michelle Gellar as Tanya Martin (special guest star); Brittany Allen as Laura Moser; Raquel Justice as Sofia Rivera; Jeff Daniel Phillips as Levi Reed; Sarah Kinsey as Camilla Figg; Jasper Lewis as Doris Morgan; Aaron Jennings as Clark Sanders; Tanya Clarke as Nurse Mary; Jack Alcott as Harrison Morgan (archive footage)

Episode chronology
← Previous —	Next → "Kid in a Candy Store"

"And in the Beginning..." is the series premiere of the American crime drama mystery television series Dexter: Original Sin, prequel to Dexter and Dexter: New Blood. The episode was written by series creator Clyde Phillips, and directed by executive producer Michael Lehmann. It was released on Paramount+ with Showtime on December 13, 2024, and aired on Showtime two days later.

The episode's frame story picks up from "Sins of the Father", the finale of Dexter: New Blood, where after being shot by his son Harrison, Dexter Morgan (Michael C. Hall) is taken by the police to a hospital and revived by doctors after flatlining, where-upon his "life flashes before [his] eyes" to when he first began working as a forensic blood spatter analyst at the Miami Metro Police Department, the series exploring the younger Dexter (Patrick Gibson) and his inner conflicts, wherein he began his days as a serial killer.

The series premiere received mixed reviews from critics. While Patrick Gibson received praise for his performance as Dexter, the episode was criticized for its lack of originality and writing.

== Plot ==
In December 2021, after being shot by his son, (Note: As depicted in "Sins of the Father".) a critically wounded but still alive Dexter Morgan (Michael C. Hall) is taken by the police to a hospital. He initially flatlines after surgery, but the doctors are able to revive him. As the camera leaves the hospital, Dexter narrates, "It really is like they say. Your life flashes before your eyes." The scene transitions to a hospital on February 1, 1971, where Laura Moser (Brittany Allen) gives birth to Dexter.

In 1991, a young Dexter (Patrick Gibson) is a pre-med student at the University of Miami nearing graduation. For an assignment, he dissects a cadaver. While his classmates mock him for his fascination with the body, his teacher praises him for staying unaffected. While dining with his adoptive father, Harry (Christian Slater), Dexter explains that slicing corpses does not give him satisfaction, but Harry asks him to stick to their plan, where Dexter will eventually go to medical school and then residency to control his "urges". Per Harry's insistence, Dexter is taken by his sister Debra (Molly Brown) to a frat party. While there, Dexter discovers a boy trying to rape a drunk and passed out Debra, and he brutally beats him. Before Dexter can grab a knife, however, Debra stops him, and they are both kicked out. Dexter explains the boy's intentions, and Debra accepts it, while Dexter earns respect for protecting his sister.

When their hunting trips do not satisfy his urges, Dexter asks Harry to let him use the Code to kill someone, but he flatly refuses. As Dexter explains the party incident, Harry collapses, and Dexter rushes him to the hospital. Harry is diagnosed with a non-ST elevation myocardial infarction, result of his drinking and heavy smoking. Despite being told that he will quickly recover and be allowed to go home in one week, Harry's condition worsens. Upon investigating, Dexter concludes that Harry's caretaker, Nurse Mary (Tanya Clarke), is poisoning him through injections, which she has done to other patients. (Note: Previously seen in "Popping Cherry".) He checks her office and finds that she keeps the obituary papers of her victims as trophies, and confirms that her injections contain high levels of potassium nitrate. Dexter reveals this to Harry, and prevents Mary from injecting him again. Realizing she cannot be saved, Harry tells him to "stop her", delighting Dexter. A flashback reveals that Harry and his wife Doris had a son, who accidentally drowned in their pool in 1973, devastating them.

At Mary's home, Dexter assembles his first kill room, covering the walls and furniture with plastic sheeting. When she arrives Dexter clumsily attempts to subdue her, resulting in a struggle, but he eventually succeeds, knocking her unconscious. She awakens tied to the killing table, and he confronts her for killing multiple people. He then fatally stabs her, making her his first victim. He saves her earrings as trophies and drives her corpse to the Everglades in his truck, dumping it into the water where alligators eat it. When he arrives home in the morning, Dexter meets Harry's co-workers from Miami Metro; Captain Aaron Spencer (Patrick Dempsey), CSI Chief Tanya Martin (Sarah Michelle Gellar), forensics specialist Vince Masuka (Alex Shimizu), Detective Angel Batista (James Martinez), and Detective Bobby Watt (Reno Wilson). Impressed by his work on a serial killer case, Tanya offers him a paid internship at Miami Metro. After his graduation, Dexter visits a recovering Harry, who is leaving the hospital in a wheelchair. Back home, Harry asks Dexter about the killing, and Dexter says that it "felt right." When Dexter leaves, Harry breaks down in tears, conflicted over his son's nature. Harry takes Dexter to Miami Metro the following day, where Dexter settles in with Masuka and Tanya.

== Production ==
=== Development ===
The episode was written by series creator Clyde Phillips, and directed by executive producer Michael Lehmann.

=== Writing ===
The opening scene reveals that Dexter Morgan actually survived the events of Dexter: New Blood, despite Clyde Phillips previously stating that he had died, and that the character would in "no circumstance" be brought back. Phillips explained that the fandom's negative reception to the episode made him consider changing it, and Michael C. Hall convinced him that he could continue playing Dexter if he found a way for the character to survive. Phillips also offered an explanation behind his survival, "if Dexter had been shot on a summer's day, he would have died. But he was shot in zero-degree temperature in the snow. He didn't bleed out and they were able to save him. That's how we were able to resurrect him.

The episode addresses Dexter's first kill, which was previously seen in flashbacks in "Popping Cherry". Phillips said that it was important to revisit it, "We needed to stay in his head and see him face temptations like the fight at the fraternity. We need to see how the urge is too big."

The episode reveals that Harry and Doris had a son before Dexter and Debra, who died after drowning in a swimming pool. Christian Slater commented, "I think that tragedy would be something that's just unrecoverable from. And I think it motivates so many of his choices with Dexter, choices with Deb... As we went from episode to episode, it was really interesting to follow the choices that he makes and some of the mistakes that happened, and it's hard to predict the future. You're trying to do one thing, and then this happens. You can't plan for everything, but I think all of those elements and aspects certainly led to who Harry ends up becoming and expressing unconditional love for Dexter."

== Reception ==
"And in the Beginning..." received mixed reviews from critics. Eric Goldman of IGN gave the episode a "mediocre" 5 out of 10 and wrote in his verdict, "Dexter: Original Sin gets off to a rough start, reminding us that there was little need for a prequel about Dexter Morgan – so much that's in this premiere episode was already depicted or explained in the original series. There's also a struggle to overcome the “Dexter Babies” vibe given off by the new actors playing Dexter's family and co-workers, who are often replicating the mannerisms and performances of the actors who played those characters before. It remains to be seen what the overall arc of Original Sin is, though, and if it will be compelling enough to maintain interest for the season. A good murder mystery can overcome a lot of hiccups."

Brian Tallerico of The A.V. Club gave the episode a "C–" and wrote, "To be fair to this awkward premiere, the final scene of “And In The Beginning…” feels like the real start to Dexter: Original Sin. Dexter Morgan arrives to his first day on the job at Miami PD, ready to help solve cases in a way that satisfies his vengeful inner psychopath. And Gibson comes to life in this scene a bit, as if he's finally becoming the Dexter we know after saving both his father and sister, taking a murderer off the streets, and finding the job of his dreams."

Louis Peitzman of Vulture gave the episode a 4 star rating out of 5 and wrote, "As far as shameless brand extensions go, this series feels mostly harmless, and it's off to a promising enough start that we can overlook how desperately Showtime is determined to squeeze the life out of this franchise. In an era of endless IP, Dexter: Original Sin is at least entertaining, and that's more than can be said for countless other recent cash grabs."

Alex McLevy of Episodic Medium wrote, "this was a bad episode and a clunky start to Dexter: Original Sin, but also possibly (hopefully?) an admission that the series doesn't give a fuck about any of this world building, because in their heart of hearts, Phillips and company know we don't need it." Mads Misasi of Telltale TV gave the episode a perfect 5 star rating out of 5 and wrote, "When a character has already been established, continuing the franchise with a sequel or a prequel becomes daunting. The creators have to be sure the different versions of these characters still line up, and so far, Dexter: Original Sin Season 1 Episode 1, “And In The Beginning…” does that perfectly."

Greg MacArthur of Screen Rant wrote, "A two-episode premiere of Dexter: Original Sin might have been the way to go for Paramount. With nine episodes left, it's too early to tell how the prequel will turn out but what is clear is that the series is at a crucial crossroads even after one episode. Some moments work really well with the nimble dance between Gibson's spot-on Dexter mannerisms and Hall's classic dry Dexter humor. If Dexter: Original Sin gives us more of this killer Gibson-Hall combo, it could easily salvage its stumbling start." Lisa Babick of TV Fanatic gave the episode a perfect 5 star rating out of 5 and wrote, "All in all, it was a well-written, well-acted premiere, and I can't wait to see where the next episode takes us."
