= Michael Cuesta =

American film and television director (born 1963)

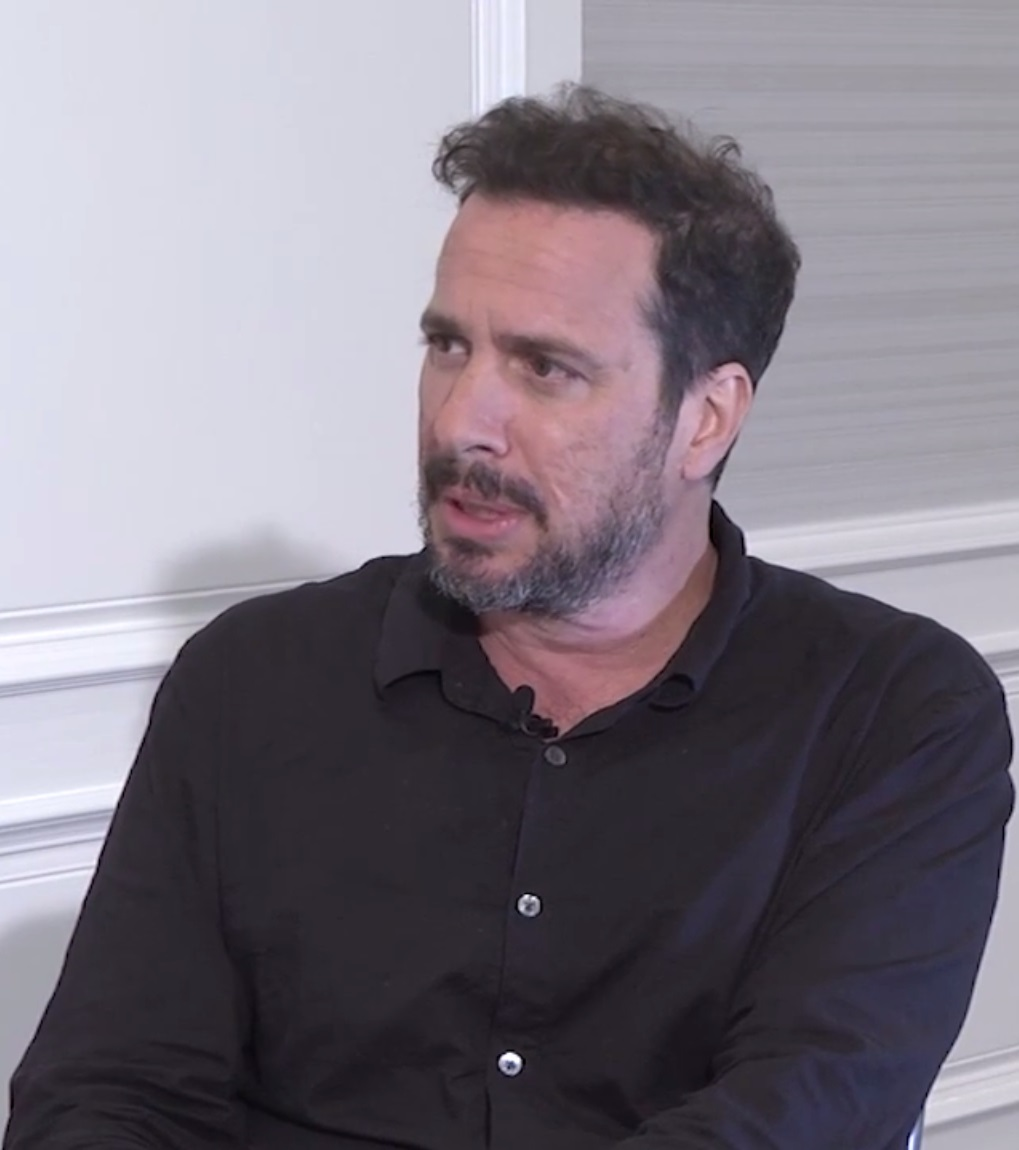
- Cuesta interviewed by Sidewalks Entertainment in 2014
- Born: July 8, 1963 (age 62); New York City, New York, United States
- Occupations: Film director, television director, screenwriter
- Years active: 2001 – present

Michael Cuesta (born July 8, 1963) is an American film and television director, best known for his independent films, especially for having co-written and directed the 2001 film L.I.E. He has directed and produced television series including Six Feet Under, Dexter, Blue Bloods and Homeland.

== Life and career ==
Cuesta was born in New York City. He received a BFA in photography from the School of Visual Arts in 1985. Cuesta co-wrote (with Stephen Ryder and Gerald Cuesta) and directed the 2001 independent film L.I.E., which starred Paul Dano, Brian Cox, Billy Kay, and Bruce Altman. L.I.E. received critical acclaim and two Independent Spirit Awards at the Sundance Film Festival.

His film L.I.E. led him to become a regular director for the HBO original series Six Feet Under, which aired from 2001 to 2005. According to executive producer Alan Poul, "During the second season, we had hired a director for the fourth episode, but he fell out one week before the start of pre-production. Alan Ball and I were alarmed, but that night we went to see L.I.E., and it was a revelation. The next morning we booked Michael. He's a fantastic fit for the show." Michael Cuesta became a regular director during the 2002 season of Six Feet Under and directed five episodes of the series including the fourth-season premiere, "Falling into Place".

In addition to Six Feet Under and L.I.E., Cuesta also directed the film 12 and Holding, which premiered at the Toronto International Film Festival in 2005 and was released by IFC Films theatrically in 2006. Other projects include an adaptation of the novel, The Miracle Life of Edgar Mint.

In 2006, Cuesta directed the pilot episode of the Showtime series Dexter. The show reunited him with former Six Feet Under star Michael C. Hall in the lead role, Dexter Morgan. Cuesta joined the production staff for the first season and also directed further episodes including the season finale. He left the crew at the end of the first season.

He also directed the second-season finale for the HBO series True Blood which was created and executive produced by Alan Ball, creator and show runner of Six Feet Under.

Cuesta would have executive produced Babylon Fields, a CBS television series about zombies proposed for the 2007–2008 season. The show was not picked up. In 2013, NBC bought the rights to Babylon Fields, choosing Michael Cuesta as the director because of his familiarity with the prior pilot. A pilot was filmed in 2014 but the show was not picked up.

Cuesta directed and executive produced the pilot episode for CBS drama Blue Bloods in 2010. The series was created by Robin Green and Mitchell Burgess and focuses on a family of New York police officers. He returned to direct the eighth episode of the first season "Chinatown".

He was nominated for a Primetime Emmy Award for directing Homeland's Pilot episode.

In 2011, he directed the film Roadie starring Ron Eldard as a man who returns home to Queens, NY after twenty years on the road with Blue Öyster Cult. Co-written with his brother Gerald Cuesta and featuring supporting roles by Jill Hennessy, Bobby Cannavale, Lois Smith and David Margulies, the film was screened at the Stony Brook Film Festival, Vancouver International Film Festival and Austin Film Festival in 2011. It was released by Magnolia Pictures on January 6, 2012.

In February 2013, Cuesta was set up to direct the film Kill the Messenger for a 2014 release date, with Jeremy Renner leading the film. Filming started in the summer of 2013 in Atlanta. In January, Cuesta 2015 was named as the director of the pilot episode of Fox Television Studios drama horror series Frankenstein, based on Mary Shelley's novel Frankenstein.

== Filmography ==
Film

- L.I.E. (2001)
- 12 and Holding (2005)
- Tell-Tale (2009)
- Roadie (2011)
- Kill the Messenger (2014)
- American Assassin (2017)

Television

Year	Title	Director	Executive Producer	Episode	Notes
2002–2005	Six Feet Under	Yes	No	"Driving Mr. Mossback"	
2002–2005	Six Feet Under	Yes	No	"Someone Else's Eyes"	
2002–2005	Six Feet Under	Yes	No	"You Never Know"	
2002–2005	Six Feet Under	Yes	No	"Falling Into Place"	
2002–2005	Six Feet Under	Yes	No	"Static"	
2006	Dexter	Yes	Yes	"Dexter"	
2006	Dexter	Yes	Yes	"Crocodile"	
2006	Dexter	Yes	Yes	"Popping Cherry"	
2006	Dexter	Yes	Yes	"Seeing Red"	
2006	Dexter	Yes	Yes	"Born Free"	
2007	Babylon Fields	Yes	Yes	"Pilot" (CBS)	Unaired
2008	The Oaks	Yes	Yes	"Amelia"	
2009	True Blood	Yes	No	"Beyond Here Lies Nothin'	
2010	Blue Bloods	Yes	Yes	"Pilot"	
2010	Blue Bloods	Yes	Yes	"Chinatown"	
2011–2020	Homeland	Yes	Yes	"Pilot"	
2011–2020	Homeland	Yes	Yes	"Grace"	
2011–2020	Homeland	Yes	Yes	"The Weekend"	
2011–2020	Homeland	Yes	Yes	"Marine One"	
2011–2020	Homeland	Yes	Yes	"The Smile"	
2011–2020	Homeland	Yes	Yes	"Beirut Is Back"	
2011–2020	Homeland	Yes	Yes	"I'll Fly Away"	
2011–2020	Homeland	Yes	Yes	"The Choice"	
2011–2020	Homeland	Yes	No	"The English Teacher"	
2012	Elementary	Yes	No	"Pilot"	
2014	Babylon Fields	Yes	No	"Pilot" (NBC)	Unaired
2016	Second Chance	Yes	Yes	"A Suitable Donor"	
2016	Billions	Yes	No	"The Conversation"	
2019	City on a Hill	Yes	Yes	"The Night Flynn Sent the Cops on the Ice"	
2021	Dopesick	Yes	No	"The 5th Vital Sign"	
2021	Dopesick	Yes	No	"Pseudo-Addiction"	
2022	Promised Land	Yes	Yes	"A Place Called Heritage"	
2023	Accused	Yes	Yes	"Scott's Story"	
2025	Daredevil: Born Again	Yes	No	"Optics"	
2025	Daredevil: Born Again	Yes	No	"The Hollow of His Hand"	
2026	Man on Fire	Yes	No	"Seven"	
