= Lizette Carrión =

American actress

- Born: March 12, 1972 (age 53); New York City, U.S.
- Occupation: Actress
- Known for: Over There (2005)

Lizette Carrión (born March 12, 1972) is an American actress, best known for her portrayal of PFC Esmeralda "Doublewide" Del Rio in the 2005 FX network television series Over There.

== Early life and education ==
Carrión was born in New York City, New York, the youngest of four siblings. She holds a bachelor's degree in Government and Politics from St. John's University.

== Career ==
Carrión has performed in many New York City theatre productions such as "Bed, Bawd and Beyond" and "Flores and Alice Underground" to name a few. Carrión has multiple guest credits to her name on shows such as NYPD Blue, Judging Amy, Chicago Hope and ER. She has recently wrapped up production on the movie "Shackles" which she co-stars in with D.L. Hughley and "Crazylove".

== Filmography ==
- Medium (2007) as Cashier
- Dexter (2006) as Shanda
- Crazylove (2005) as Maria
- Shackles (2005) as Rosa
- Over There (2005) as Pfc. Esmeralda "Doublewide" Del Rio
- The Division (2002 & 2004)
- Strong Medicine (2003) as Sarita Ballard
- Reba (2003) as Halle
- The Practice (2002) as Christina Portes
- The Chronicle (2002) as Monica / "Savage Simian"
- FreakyLinks (2000) as Lan Williams
- Third Watch (1999) as Sylvia Enrique
- ER (1999) as Lizette
- Chicago Hope (1999) as I Dunno Girl
- Brooklyn South (1998) as Luce
- Fired Up (1997) as Pierced Girl
- Family Matters (1997) as High Bidder
- Sister, Sister (1996) as M'lissa
