= Daniel Cerone =

American television writer and producer

- Occupation(s): Writer and producer

Daniel Cerone is a television writer and executive producer. His credits include Dexter, where he served as showrunner, along with The Blacklist, The Mentalist, Dirty Sexy Money and Charmed. He was the co-creator of Constantine, the critically acclaimed adaptation of the DC comics Vertigo series Hellblazer, which developed a cult following. He also created and executive produced Clubhouse, the CBS baseball drama, as well as the ABC police procedural Motive.

== Biography ==
Cerone joined the writing staff of Dexter for the premiere season in 2006. Cerone was nominated for a Writers Guild of America Award for Best Dramatic Series at the February 2008 ceremony for his work on the first season of Dexter. Based on his creative leadership, Cerone was promoted to executive producer and co-showrunner for the second season, which won a distinguished Peabody Award. He was also nominated for a second WGA Award and a Primetime Emmy Award for Outstanding Drama Series for his work on the second season of Dexter.

== Credits ==
- Solving Charlie: Low-level detective discovers he has a brilliant 11-year-old brother who loves solving puzzles.
- Constantine: Co-creator and show-runner of the NBC adaptation of the Vertigo comic book series Hellblazer.
