= C. S. Lee =

American actor and comedian

C.S. Lee
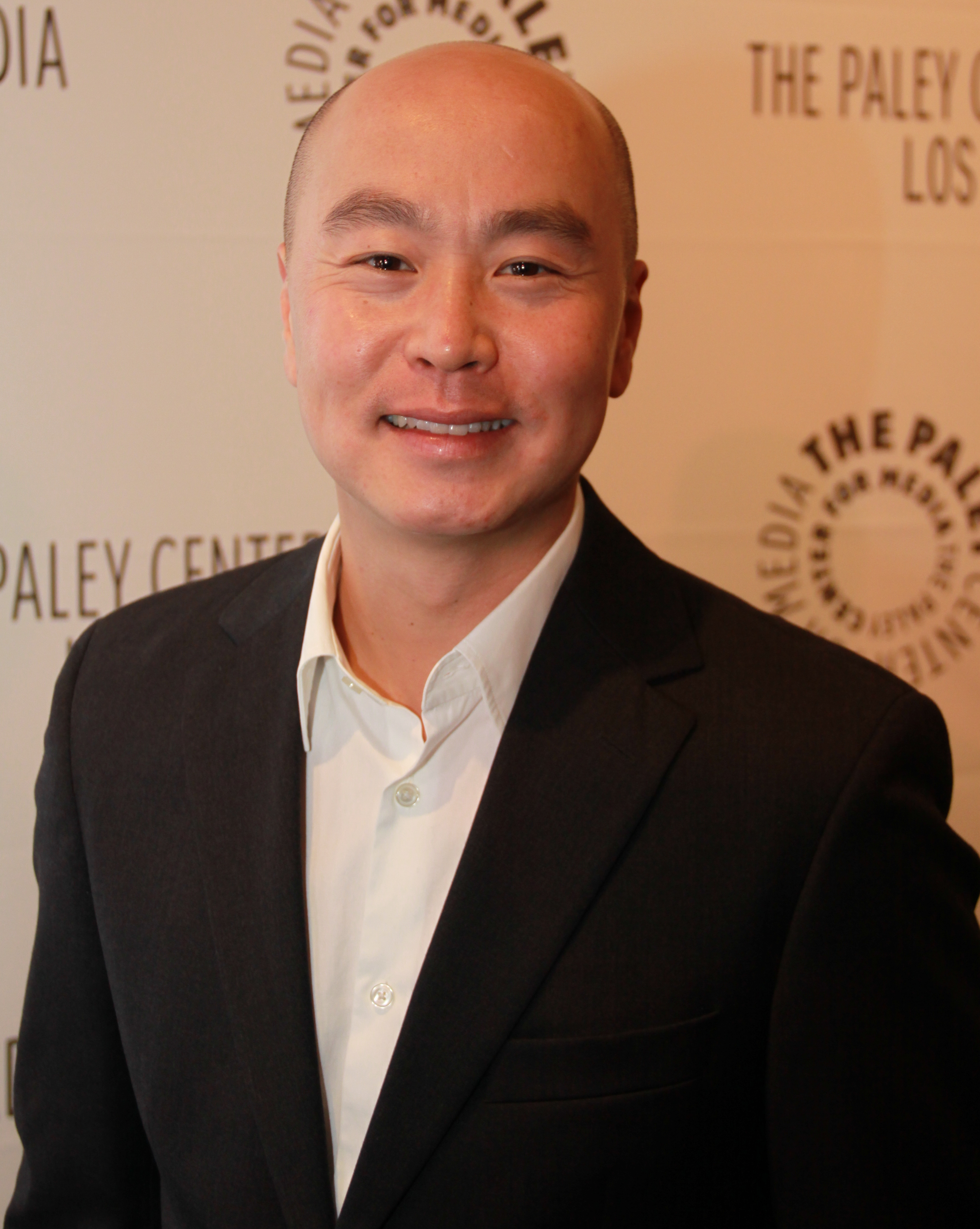
- Lee at the PaleyFest's Dexter night, Saban Theatre, March 2010
- Born: Seunghee Yi; December 30, 1971 (age 54); Cheongju, South Korea
- Other names: Charlie Lee, C.S. Lee
- Education: Cornish College of the Arts (BFA); Yale University (MFA)
- Occupations: Actor, comedian
- Years active: 1998–present
- Notable work: Vince Masuka on Dexter
- Spouse: Lara Cho
- Children: 3

- C. S. Lee
- Hangul: 이승희
- RR: I Seunghui
- MR: I Sŭnghŭi

Charlie Seunghee Lee (Korean: 이승희; born Seunghee Yi; December 30, 1971) is an American actor and comedian. He is best known for playing forensics analyst Vince Masuka on the Showtime drama series Dexter.

== Early life and education ==
Lee was born in Cheongju, South Korea. Acting became one of his two passions at Hudson's Bay High School in Vancouver, Washington, along with playing football where he was a running back and quarterback. He attended Cornish College of the Arts on an acting scholarship and graduated with a Bachelor of Fine Arts degree. He graduated from the Yale School of Drama with a Master of Fine Arts degree. Lee started his career in New York City acting with various theater companies, regional theater, as well as performing in television and film.

== Career ==
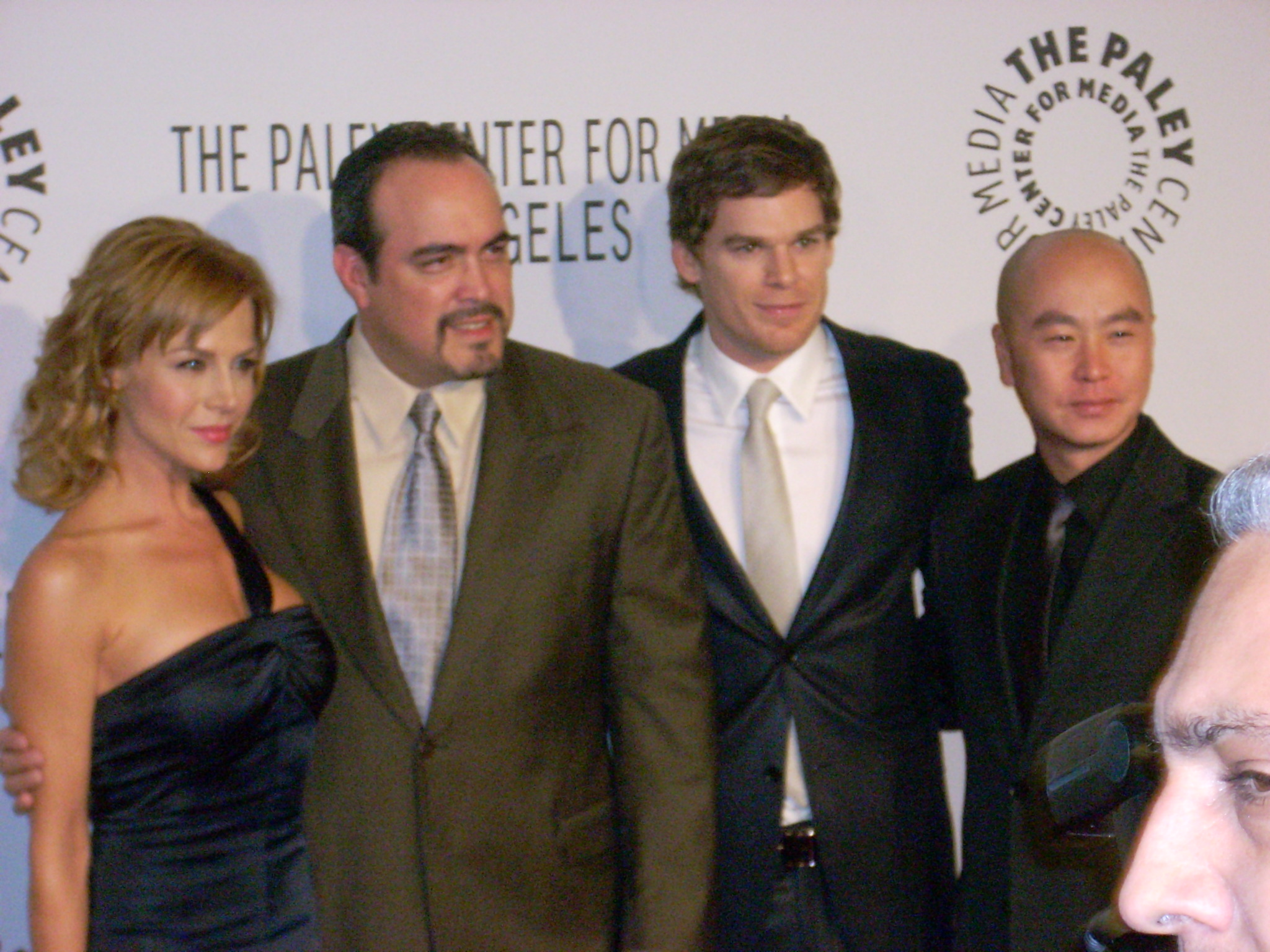
The cast of Dexter at the Paley Center for Media Gala Honoring Showtime Networks in 2008, from left to right: Julie Benz, David Zayas, Michael C. Hall, and C. S. Lee

Lee is best known for the Showtime drama series Dexter, playing the role of Vince Masuka, a forensic scientist known for his raunchy sense of humor and love of women.

Lee plays Dr. Ba on the HBO drama series The Sopranos. He plays a doctor in the 2009 film The Unborn. Lee has also appeared as Harry Tang, Chuck's officious co-worker, in the NBC comedy-spy series Chuck and as a deputy in an episode of Monk, "Mr. Monk Is on the Run (Part One)". He can also be seen as the office worker holding the boombox in the award-winning Nextel commercial, "Nextel Dance Party". In the CBS series The Unit, Lee plays a small part as a South Korean submariner in episode 13 of the second season.

He also provides the voice of Jin Jae-hoon and Illuminati Pyramidion in the video game The Secret World.

Lee appeared in season six of Cobra Kai in the role of Master Kim Sun-yung.

== Personal life ==
Lee married Lara Cho in 2009. He has 3 children.

== Filmography ==
=== Film ===
Year	Title	Role	Notes
1999	Random Hearts	Luncheonette Counterman	
2002	Sophie	Father Kim	Short film
2004	Cha Cha de los Chans	Dr. Chan	
2004	Our Italian Husband	Shuei	
2004	The Stepford Wives	Additional Stepford Husband	
2009	Tenderness	Highway Patrolman	
2009	The Unborn	Dr. Lester Caldwell	
2012	Innocence Blood	Vincent Lee	
2013	Altered Minds	Harry Shellner	
2017	Everything Beautiful Is Far Away	The Stranger	
2019	Come as You Are	Roger	
2020	All Together Now	Father Chee	
2025	Tuner	Yong	
TBA	Wekiwa †	Dr. Lee	

=== Television ===
Year	Title	Role	Notes
1998–1999	Spin City	First Reporter	2 episodes
1998–2003	Law & Order	Forensics Technician Turot / Kenny Chen / Pharmacist	3 episodes
2002	Guiding Light	Dr. Hong	Unknown episodes
2003	Ed	Hal Clapone	Episode: "Partners"
2004–2006	Law & Order: Criminal Intent	Detective Mike Lew / Detective Matt See / Detective Choi	3 episodes
2005	As the World Turns	Faux Hwa	2 episodes
2006	The Sopranos	Dr. Ba	2 episodes
2006–2013	Dexter	Vince Masuka	95 episodes
2007	Chuck	Harry Tang	6 episodes
2007	The Unit	XO	Episode: "Sub Conscious"
2008	Monk	Deputy Bell	Episode: "Mr. Monk Is on the Run (Part One)"
2013	Blue Bloods	Mr. Lin	Episode: "The Truth About Lying"
2014	Criminal Minds	Justin Leu	Episode: "Burn"
2015	Fresh Off the Boat	Steve Chen	2 episodes
2015	Blunt Talk	Emanuel	2 episodes
2015	The League	Assistant Minister	Episode: "The Last Temptation of Andre"
2015	True Detective	Richard Geldof	4 episodes
2015–2017	Sneaky Pete	Joseph Lee	3 episodes
2016	Family Guy	Soap Opera Actor (voice)	Episode: "Candy, Quahog Marshmallow
2016	Power	Jae Shin	5 episodes
2017	MacGyver	FEMA Director Sam Hopkins	Episode: "Flashlight "
2017	24: Legacy	Agent Daniel Pang	Episode: "10:00 PM – 11:00 PM"
2017	Silicon Valley	Monk	2 episodes
2018	Lethal Weapon	Gene Nakahara	Episode: "Diggin' Up Dirt"
2018	Magnum P.I.	William Malau	Episode: "Die He Said"
2018	Snowfall	William Han	Episode: "Sightlines"
2018–2019	Chicago Med	Bernard 'Bernie' Kim	6 episodes
2019	Warrior	Lu	Episode: "The Blood and the Sh*t"
2020	All Rise	Lt. Logan Hunt	Episode: "My Fair Lockdown"
2020	The Rookie	Jun-ha	Episode: "Follow-Up Day"
2022–present	For All Mankind	Lee Jung-Gil	15 episodes
2022–2023	East New York	Sergeant Jimmy Kee	Recurring Cast
2023	Pantheon	Delegate, Man, Security Guard (voices)	2 episodes
2023	Quantum Leap	Jin Park	Episode: "One Night in Koreatown"
2023	Bookie	Jack Han	2 episodes
2024	The Brothers Sun	Hong	Episode: "The Rolodex"
2024	Avatar: The Last Airbender	Avatar Roku	Episode: "Masks"
2024–2025	Cobra Kai	Master Kim Sun Yung	Episodes: "The Prize" & "Into the Fire"
2025	Dexter: Resurrection	Vince Masuka	Episode: "Backseat Driver"

=== Video games ===
Year	Title	Role
2004	Grand Theft Auto: San Andreas	Gangster
2005	Grand Theft Auto: Liberty City Stories	Pedestrian
2009	Dexter the Game	Vince Masuka
2012	The Secret World	Jin Jae-hoon, Illuminati Pyramidion
