= James Doakes =

Fictional character in the Dexter television series

- Dexter character
- Erik King as James Doakes.
- First appearance: Novels: Darkly Dreaming Dexter (2004); Television: "Dexter" (2006)
- Last appearance: Novels: Dexter is Dead (2015); Television: "A Beating Heart..." (2025)
- Created by: Jeff Lindsay
- Portrayed by: Erik King

In-universe information
- Gender: Male
- Occupation: Detective Sergeant
- Family: Mother, two sisters
- Nationality: American

James Doakes (named Albert Doakes in the books) is a fictional character in the Dexter television series and the novels by Jeff Lindsay. In the TV series, he is portrayed by Erik King. Doakes holds the rank of detective sergeant and appears in the first two seasons of the show. He is the first member of the Miami Metro Homicide Division to suspect and discover that Dexter Morgan (Michael C. Hall) is secretly the serial killer dubbed the "Bay Harbor Butcher." Dexter's efforts to evade and sabotage Doakes' investigation serve as a central storyline in the second season.

== Biography ==
Doakes enlisted in the U.S. Army and earned the nickname "Sane James" for his ability to detect the mentally unhinged. Doakes went on to become an Army Ranger, serving with the elite Regimental Reconnaissance Detachment. After spending many years in black operations, Doakes gave up his military career, electing instead to use his skills to help civilians as a police officer. Doakes's police career grinds to a halt when he receives excessive force citations; his volatile, angry nature proves he cannot work well with others (unless leading them). At one point, Doakes was married, but eventually left his wife out of fear that his PTSD would lead to him hurting her. Doakes was partnered with Maria LaGuerta, which ended after she was promoted following a high-profile drug bust. They also developed a romantic relationship together, which eventually ended due to Doakes's nature.

=== Season 1 ===
At the beginning of the series, Doakes is the one person who views Dexter Morgan as creepy and weird, and continuously calls him a freak due to his eccentric nature and seeming love of blood. Despite this, he is not fully cognizant of Dexter's true nature and his suspicions are limited to cruel jokes at his expense.

Early in Season 1, the Miami Metro team discover the body of a cop named Ricky Simmons, and later discover that his wife Kara has been shot. They are able to link the murders to drug lord Carlos Guerrero, whom Ricky had infiltrated the operation of. LaGuerta comes to find out that Doakes was having an affair with Kara, planning for her to ask for a divorce once Ricky finished his undercover operation.

The news of Doakes's affair leads him to earn the spite of other cops, one of whom is Kara's brother. They manipulate him into tagging along on a joyride, where they brutally beat one of Guerrero's lieutenants, while Doakes is unmasked and visible, leading to Guerrero having his men spy on him. They eventually kidnap Doakes, but are attacked by the cops, who save Doakes's life.

Later on, Doakes, while on a drive with Angel Batista, sees a Haitian man with groceries, and immediately pursues him, eventually killing him under a bridge. Doakes claims the man had shot at him first, leading to him taking cover and returning fire, which is disputed by both Dexter's analysis of the blood spatter and Batista's claim that he heard Doakes's gun go off first. Batista's doubts lead him to confidentially reveal the truth of the matter to Internal Affairs. When LaGuerta realizes this, she does research and learns that the man Doakes killed was a member of the Tonton Macoute, a Haitian paramilitary force Doakes encountered during his time in the army and who traumatized Doakes. LaGuerta then sweeps the situation under the rug.

In the finale, Doakes and LaGuerta learn from Batista that he had visited Debra's boyfriend Rudy Cooper for clues about the Ice Truck Killer shortly before being stabbed, and that Dexter's sister Debra has gone missing shortly after leaving to meet with him. When they meet with Dexter, Dexter confesses that he had blood on Batista's shirt tested to see if it matched Rudy's, which it did, revealing Rudy to be the Ice Truck Killer. Doakes is furious at Dexter for concealing this information, and after a manhunt begins for Rudy, Doakes secretly follows Dexter to a shipping yard and attacks him when he refuses to reveal his reasons for going. After Dexter is later seen at Rudy's house following his escape, Doakes asks for him to be suspended, which Debra argues against. These incidents lead to Doakes being hyper-vigilant and suspicious of Dexter.

=== Season 2 ===
LaGuerta tells him to back off, but Doakes begins following Dexter in secret. Doakes ends his investigations when he finds Dexter attending a Narcotics Anonymous meeting, supposedly for heroin addiction; Doakes erroneously believes Dexter's dark secret is that he is a drug addict. Feeling sympathetic towards Dexter for once, Doakes briefly leaves him alone.

Doakes resumes the hunt after Debra reveals that Dexter has never even tried smoking a cigarette. After Doakes starts investigating Dexter's past, Dexter goads him into a fight—seemingly unprovoked—in front of the entire squad room. Doakes is initially prepared to accept dismissal and take a high-paying security job LaGuerta set up for him, only to begin suspecting Dexter is the notorious Bay Harbor Butcher when Special Agent Frank Lundy mentions shoddy blood work as a reason for the acquittal of one of the Butcher's victims.

Doakes, in the course of following Dexter, stumbles upon Santos Jimenez's remains and Dexter's blood slide collection box, and realizes Dexter's secret: he is the Bay Harbor Butcher. Doakes becomes the prime suspect in the case when he leaves Miami to get the blood slides analyzed. Doakes attempts to apprehend Dexter himself in the Everglades, but Dexter gets the upper hand and locks him in Jimenez's cabin until he can decide what to do with him. Doakes tries to persuade Dexter to turn himself in to the police because it will protect those he cares about. Dexter considers doing it. Doakes manages to escape from his cage, but he ends up with Esteban and Teo Famosa, drug runners tied to Jimenez. They take Doakes hostage and force him to retrieve the drugs stored inside the cabin. Dexter happens upon the scene, and he and Doakes work together to take the dealers down. Immediately after this, Dexter imprisons Doakes again. In the end, Dexter's erstwhile lover Lila Tournay finds the cabin, and makes the decision for him: after finding out from Doakes that Dexter is the Bay Harbor Butcher, she tries to protect him by blowing up the cabin, thus eliminating Doakes as a witness. Doakes's incinerated remains are found along with the dismembered body of Jose Garza, and so the case is closed, with the official conclusion being Doakes was the Butcher and deliberately blew himself up to avoid arrest; the latter detail causes Dexter to realize Doakes couldn't have caused the explosion himself, and that Lila was responsible. Later on, Lila attempts to burn Dexter along with Rita Bennett's children, but he survives and murders Lila in Paris, avenging Doakes. Doakes's funeral is largely unattended, with the exception of LaGuerta, Dexter (who sits discreetly in the back, thinking about how he lost another person who understood him), and Doakes' mother and sisters. Doakes is replaced as sergeant by Angel Batista.

=== Season 7 ===
When LaGuerta finds the blood slide with Dexter's victim Travis Marshall's blood on it, she suspects that the real Bay Harbor Butcher is still alive. Dexter, determined to stop LaGuerta, cements his frame job of Doakes by planting kill tools and plastic wrap (with Doakes's prints) at an abandoned ship yard.

In the season finale, Doakes makes an appearance, in flashbacks of previously unseen confrontations between him and Dexter set before the events of season 1, and detailing how he became suspicious of Dexter, as well as his romantic involvement with LaGuerta—a major motive behind her determination to clear his name.

=== New Blood ===
James Doakes is mentioned in Molly Park’s True Crime Podcast episode about the Bay Harbor Butcher, in which she mentions that a former Special Operations colleague of Doakes provides an alibi saying they were out of the country at the same time of some of the BHB murders.

In the final episode, Angela Bishop, a small town, rural New York police chief and Dexter's ex-girlfriend, decides to call Angel Batista to question him about the Bay Harbor Butcher (Angela looked at old victims of the Bay Harbor Butcher and sees similar injection sites to the ones that two drug dealers, one killed by Dexter, have). Batista states that while he believed at the time that James Doakes was the Butcher, his ex-wife and deceased Captain María LaGuerta believed that Dexter was the Butcher. Angela then sends him a photo of her with Dexter, shocking Batista at realizing that Dexter is alive. Angela tells a shocked Batista that Dexter is in a cell, accused of murder. Batista finds a file labeled "MARIA LAGUERTA" and tells her he will be there by the morning with everything he has. Angela once again confronts Dexter, showing a pattern between the needle marks on the drug dealers and some of the Butcher's retrieved bodies, reaffirming her belief that he is the Bay Harbor Butcher. She states he will be arraigned for Matt Caldwell's murder and when Batista arrives, he will be extradited to Miami and be charged as the Bay Harbor Butcher, possibly getting the death penalty.

=== Resurrection ===
As Dexter lies comatose after being shot in the chest by his son Harrison, he hallucinates Doakes visiting his bedside and encouraging him to find Harrison and make amends with him. When Dexter wakes, he is informed by Batista that Angela has retracted her statement about her believing him to be the Bay Harbor Butcher. However, Batista continues to investigate the case of his own accord, with his suspicions further piqued when he finds out that a murder took place in a New York City hotel, using the Bay Harbor Butcher's modus operandi.

While looking through a book called The Killing Century, Dexter finds Doakes' picture in a chapter on the Bay Harbor Butcher.

After Batista is fatally shot by Leon Prater, Dexter tells his dying friend that while he's the Bay Harbor Butcher, he didn't kill Doakes and LaGuerta. However, Batista tells Dexter that LaGuerta, Doakes and his own deaths are all Dexter's fault, nonetheless.

== Differences from the novels ==
In the novels, Doakes's first name is "Albert", and he served in El Salvador with the United States Marine Corps Force Reconnaissance. Dexter believes that Doakes has a "Dark Passenger" of his own, and deals with it by being as violent as he legally can in his job. After LaGuerta's murder at the end of Darkly Dreaming Dexter, Doakes believes Dexter was the killer, and tails Dexter in Dearly Devoted Dexter, intending to "catch him in the act". Instead, Doakes himself is captured by "Dr. Danco", a psychopathic doctor who served alongside Doakes and blames him for the incarceration and torture he suffered after being betrayed to the Cubans; to get revenge, he tortures Doakes by removing his feet, hands, and tongue. In Dexter in the Dark, Doakes returns briefly, but cannot communicate.

== In popular culture ==
The character of Doakes has been the subject of several internet memes. Doakes surprising Dexter by saying "Surprise motherfucker!" to him in the first season's finale became a meme in the late 2000s; a website was created in which Doakes was placed in other movies while stating the line, including Scream (1996). In a 2016 interview with Mental Floss, King acknowledged the meme: "It was weird. I had never had a performance taken out of context before, so it took some getting used to. But I found it flattering." In 2025, another internet meme featuring Doakes went viral on social media. The meme, which originated from a September 2024 post on Reddit referencing Doakes' suspicious nature, consisted of pairing images or videos of Doakes with captions "describing moments of silent doubt or personal theories." After going viral on TikTok in early 2025, the meme spread in popularity to Twitter and Reddit, and was used to poke fun at topics such as the Coldplay kiss cam incident.
