= Dexter by Design =

2009 novel by Jeff Lindsay

- United Kingdom first edition hardback cover
- Author: Jeff Lindsay
- Cover artist: Edward Bettison - Design & Art Direction
- Language: English
- Series: Dexter Morgan
- Genre: Crime novel, Horror
- Publisher: Orion Books Limited
- Publication date: February 2009 (UK), September 2009 (U.S.)
- Publication place: United Kingdom
- Media type: Print (hardback)
- Pages: 304 (Hardcover February 2009 edition)
- ISBN: 978-0-7528-8517-9
- OCLC: 232712929
- Preceded by: Dexter in the Dark
- Followed by: Dexter Is Delicious

Dexter by Design (2009) is a mystery novel written by Jeff Lindsay. It is the fourth novel in the Dexter series, preceded by Darkly Dreaming Dexter (which formed the basis for the Showtime television series Dexter), Dearly Devoted Dexter, and Dexter in the Dark, following Dexter Morgan, a sociopathic forensic analyst with a "hobby" of killing killers, as he investigates a serial killer.

Dexter by Design was released in the United Kingdom on February 19, 2009.

== Plot summary ==
After the events of the previous book, Dexter Morgan is eager to resume his hobby of stalking violent criminals, but first, he must endure a honeymoon in Paris with his unsuspecting wife, Rita. At an art gallery, the couple views an avant-garde performance piece in which the artist amputates her own limb. Upon returning home, Dexter finds that his relationship with his sister, Deborah, has become strained since she learned of his murderous pastime. Deborah, now a sergeant in the MPD's homicide unit, is torn between loyalty to Dexter and her duty as a police officer to arrest him.

Dexter is called to investigate a gruesome tableau on a local beach, where a pair of bodies has been mutilated and arranged in a display that parodies the state's tourist trade. At home, Rita is concerned for her children, Cody and Astor, who appear withdrawn and different from normal children. Dexter knows that they share his pathology and has promised to train them to kill those who deserve it, as his adoptive father, Harry, trained him. Cody is enrolled as a Cub Scout, which Rita believes will help him to bond with normal children. Dexter believes it will help him learn to 'pretend' to be normal.

Dexter and Deb investigate a suspect named Alek Donkovic for the murders, but Deb is stabbed and put in a coma. Dexter kills Alek only to later find out that he was working with another man, who was also his lover, Brandon Weiss. Weiss records the murder and sends Dexter the recording to let him know that he’s after him. Dexter realizes Weiss is planning to project the video onto a giant building in Cuba during a festival that will be broadcast live on TV. Deb’s boyfriend, Kyle Chutsky, accompanies Dexter as they go to Cuba, hoping to stop Weiss. Weiss is tipped off that they’re there and kills a hotel worker, leaving the dead body in Dexter's hotel room, causing them all to run back to the States.

Weiss kidnaps Rita and puts her on display in an art exhibit, with a sign stating that she is an actor and that this is part of the exhibit. Dexter goes after her and reluctantly brings Cody and Astor with him. A detective who has been investigating Dexter is also killed by Weiss. Astor and Cody untie Rita, but Dexter is jumped by Weiss, who almost strangles him to death, but Rita knocks him off of Dexter and onto a saw blade, which kills him. Deb recovers from her injury and decides not to turn Dexter in. The novel ends with Rita informing Dexter that she’s pregnant.

== Characters ==
Dexter Morgan: Traumatized as a child by witnessing his mother's brutal murder in a drug deal gone wrong, Dexter was adopted by Harry Morgan, a policeman with the Miami Police Department. After finding out that young Dexter was killing neighborhood pets, Harry realized that the boy was a violent sociopath, and took it upon himself to train him to kill only people who were themselves killers. Dexter became a forensic specialist analysing blood spatter for the Miami Police Department. In his time off, he stalks and kills people who have gotten away with murder, in order to satisfy an inner voice he calls "The Dark Passenger". He has recently married his girlfriend, Rita, who has two children by a previous marriage.

Deborah Morgan: Dexter's adoptive sister and a police detective with the homicide department of Miami Police Department. Deborah has recently learned of Dexter's "hobby", and feels conflicted about keeping it a secret. Further complicating her feelings is the fact that Dexter saved her boyfriend, Kyle Chutsky, from a particularly brutal serial killer in Dearly Devoted Dexter

Kyle Chutsky: A former government operative (from an unknown agency) who lost a hand and a foot in the events described in Dearly Devoted Dexter. Boyfriend of Deborah Morgan.

Brandon Weiss: A Canadian citizen who lives in Miami and kills people as a form of avant-garde art, motivated by a desire for revenge against the Miami tourist board, a former employer.

Rita Morgan: Dexter's new wife and mother to Cody and Astor. Rita is completely unaware of Dexter's double life.

Cody and Astor: Rita's son and daughter. Both children were traumatized having been abused by their drug addict father, Rita's husband. Dexter knows that they are both showing the same signs of sociopathy that he did at that age, and has promised to teach them how to kill in the same way that Harry taught him.

== Major themes ==
The themes in Dexter by Design include the morality of taking human life and provides commentary on the human condition from an "outsider's point of view", both of which are common to the Dexter series of novels. The major themes of this particular novel are the arts, specifically modern and experimental art.

Dexter by Design briefly mentions internet fame, and includes several references to YouTube.

== Reception ==
Dexter by Design received a very positive response from critics, as opposed to the less than favourable reviews of the previous entry in the series.

"A clever, sardonic, constantly surprising novel that reveals Dexter to be much better company than Hannibal Lecter. The incredibly gory climax is both horrifying and hilarious—a very difficult trick to pull off. If only all thrillers could be this good." Evening Standard

"Another very successful encounter with the wickedly entertaining Dexter... there are genuinely funny situations, very clever plots and many excellent one-liners. Dexter has a way of getting under your skin and making you like him." Matthew Lewin, The Guardian

"Dexter—still good guy, still homicidal maniac, still genius. Join the fan club."Daily Record

== Adaptations ==
Showtime produces a television series based on the Dexter novels called Dexter, the first season of which is partially influenced by the first book in the series. Later seasons borrow from other elements in later books, but thereafter, the books and television series go separate ways, with many significant changes.

== Release details ==
- Hardback, United Kingdom, Orion, ISBN 978-0-7528-8517-9, 19 February 2009
- Paperback, United Kingdom, Orion, ISBN 978-0-7528-9757-8, February 2009
- Paperback, United Kingdom, Orion, ISBN 978-1-4091-0325-7, August 2009
- Paperback, United Kingdom, Orion, ISBN 978-0-7528-8461-5, August 2009
- Hardback, United States, Doubleday, ISBN 978-0-385-51836-9, 8 September 2009
