= Vince Masuka =

- Dexter character
- First appearance: Novels: Darkly Dreaming Dexter (2004); Television: Dexter: "Dexter" (2006)
- Last appearance: Novels: Dexter is Dead (2015); Television: Dexter: Resurrection: "Backseat Driver" (2025)
- Created by: Jeff Lindsay
- Portrayed by: C. S. Lee; Alex Shimizu (young; Original Sin)

In-universe information
- Gender: Male
- Occupation: Forensics specialist
- Children: Niki Walters (daughter)
- Nationality: Japanese American

Vincent "Vince" Masuka (Masuoka in the books) is a fictional character in the Showtime television series Dexter and the novels by Jeff Lindsay upon which the series is based. On television, he is portrayed by Korean-American actor C. S. Lee in Dexter and as a younger version by Japanese-American actor Alex Shimizu (Dexter: Original Sin).

Masuka is the Miami Metro Police lead forensic science investigator; he works alongside lead character Dexter Morgan in the lab and at crime scenes, and is known for cracking tasteless and inappropriate jokes, invoking his Japanese heritage only when convenient, and harboring unrequited desire for Dexter's foster sister Debra. Dexter, a serial killer, is concerned that Masuka will uncover his secret.

== Character overview ==
Masuka is portrayed as being obsessed with sex and is not shy about propositioning every woman he meets, although he is able to tone it down when necessary. In the third season Detective Joey Quinn confronts Masuka on his behavior, stating that it is the reason that no one likes to be around him. Masuka seems to accept Joey′s explanation when no one comes to see his speech on his newly published work, for which he has cleaned up his act and dressed formally. However, his disappointment at this quickly evaporates when Debra and others defend his assessment of a crime in front of the doubting agents from another enforcement agency by suggesting that Masuka has been published multiple times. At Debra's request, he returns to his previous demeanor at the end of the episode, although he appears less vulgar.

He is known for his loyalty to his colleagues and is greatly distraught after seeing Dexter's wife Rita kiss another man; which he tries to convey to Dexter.

== Notable events ==
Throughout the series, Masuka is portrayed as having terrible luck with new staff and interns. In the sixth season, he guides a group of interns through the labs and brings them to crime scenes. He is attracted to one of his female interns, but ends up firing her when he finds out she stole evidence from the Ice Truck Killer case (a prosthetic forearm and hand) and sold it online. He replaces her with Louis Greene, a tech-savvy game designer who helps Masuka with database analysis. In the seventh season, however, he quickly learns that Louis was the actual buyer of the stolen prosthesis when Dexter mails it back to Miami Metro with a letter of complaint. Masuka fires Louis on the spot.

In the eighth season, he discovers that he has a daughter, Niki, who was the result of a woman using one of his sperm donations. At first, Masuka suspects that Niki is using him for his money, and even has Debra (who has quit Miami Metro and started working as a private detective) look into her past. This was proven false when he learns that she works in a topless sports bar. He gets her a job as a forensics assistant at Miami Metro, allowing them to work together and get to know each other better.

In a brief scene in the Dexter: New Blood finale "Sins of the Father," while Angel Batista is briefly checking his work emails, an exchange is seen between Batista and Quinn where they discuss whether or not they will attend Masuka's wedding.

Masuka briefly appears in a flashback scene in Dexter: Resurrection, in the episode "Backseat Driver." Set ten years after the end of the original series, Quinn and Masuka learn that Batista is retiring from the police force and celebrate with him. Batista tells them that he intends to chase after something that continues to haunt him, but Batista doesn't tell his friends about his suspicions that Dexter is actually the Bay Harbor Butcher. In the season finale "And Justice for All...," Dexter admits to himself that he misses Masuka and Quinn, but acknowledges that neither of them can help him.

== Differences from the novels ==
In both the television series and the novels, Vince is socially and emotionally awkward. In the novels, Dexter views him as a kindred spirit, believing that Masuka is also "pretending to be human", and asks him to serve as the best man at his wedding. In Dearly Devoted Dexter, Vince throws a large bachelor party for Dexter within a few hours of finding out about his engagement. In the television series, Masuka sets up Dexter's bachelor party and kidnaps him to get him there (where, in the belief that he had been kidnapped by a serial killer called the Skinner, Dexter slugs him in the eye just as he opens the car trunk).

In Dexter in the Dark, Masuka takes his role as best man so seriously that he calls in favors to hire a famous caterer for Dexter's wedding.
