= Sins of the Father (Dexter: New Blood) =

- Dexter: New Blood episode
- Episode no.: Episode 10
- Directed by: Marcos Siega
- Story by: Clyde Phillips & Alexandra Franklin & Marc Muszynski
- Teleplay by: Clyde Phillips
- Cinematography by: Hillary Fyfe
- Editing by: Katie Ennis
- Original air date: January 9, 2022
- Running time: 57 minutes

Guest appearances
- David Zayas as Angel Batista (special guest star); Jamie Chung as Molly Park; Gregory Cruz as Abraham Brown; David Magidoff as Teddy Reed; Michael Cyril Creighton as Fred Jr.; Gizel Jiménez as Tess; Katy Sullivan as Esther

Episode chronology
← Previous "The Family Business"	Next → —

"Sins of the Father" is the tenth and final episode of the American television miniseries Dexter: New Blood, a continuation of Dexter. The episode was written by Clyde Phillips from a story by Phillips, Alexandra Franklin and Marc Muszynski and directed by executive producer Marcos Siega. It originally aired on Showtime on January 9, 2022, being also available on its streaming service at midnight on the same day.

The series follows Dexter Morgan after having faked his death on the original series finale. Dexter now lives in the fictional small town of Iron Lake, New York, hiding his identity under the name of Jim Lindsay, a local shopkeeper and having suppressed his killing urges. He is now in a relationship with Angela Bishop, the town's chief of police, and is beloved and respected in the town. A local troublemaker and the arrival of his son Harrison cause friction in his new life, as the past comes back to haunt him. In the episode, Dexter faces consequences after new evidence resurfaces, linking him to past crimes while Harrison debates whether to accept being a part of his father's life.

According to Nielsen Media Research, the episode was seen by an estimated 0.814 million household viewers and gained a 0.16 ratings share among adults aged 18–49, making it the most watched episode of the revival. The episode received very positive reviews from critics. Critics deemed the episode as an improvement over the original finale, praising Hall's and Alcott's performances and sense of closure. It was followed by the prequel series Dexter: Original Sin, the frame story of its premiere episode picking up immediately after the ending of "Sins of the Father", and the sequel series Dexter: Resurrection.

== Plot ==
As the townspeople of Iron Lake bring food and blankets to his burned cabin, Dexter (Michael C. Hall) remarks that he cannot teach Harrison (Jack Alcott) the "Code of Harry" in a place filled with such good people. Angela (Julia Jones) arrives after issuing an all-points bulletin on Molly Park (Jamie Chung). She tells Dexter that his house was a target of arson and asks if he has any enemies. Harrison steps in to cover for him, suggesting that Zach and many of his friends fought with him and may have been involved in the fire. Afterwards, Dexter suggests to Harrison that they should move to Los Angeles for a fresh start, and while Harrison likes the idea, he does not want to leave Iron Lake just as he is starting to fit in.

While checking the burned cabin, Angela finds something that catches her attention. That night, she returns home and sends Harrison and Audrey (Johnny Sequoyah) away. After that, she and Logan (Alano Miller) arrest Dexter for the murder of Matt Caldwell. At the station, Angela has him on record state his name as Dexter Morgan and reveals the titanium screws along with the note that Kurt left at her house. She also reveals that she found a similar screw at his cabin, whose serial numbers coincide with Matt and theorizes that Dexter killed him after the incident with the deer. Dexter offers a different theory: Kurt killed Matt, lied about his status, burned down all evidence linking him to his cabin and tried to frame Dexter for that, in an attempt to discredit Angela after she found Iris' corpse. This statement upsets Angela, although Logan considers it plausible.

Harrison visits Dexter at the station, and Dexter instructs his son to go to a hotel, promising that this crisis will end soon. Angela decides to call Angel Batista (David Zayas) to question him about the Bay Harbor Butcher. Batista states that while he believed at the time that James Doakes was the Butcher, his deceased ex-wife and Captain María LaGuerta believed that Dexter was the Butcher. Angela then sends him a photo of her with Dexter; shocked that Dexter is still alive, he sets out for Iron Lake with LaGuerta's investigation files. Angela once again confronts Dexter, showing a pattern between the needle marks on Miles O'Flynn, Jasper Hodge and some of the Butcher's retrieved bodies, reaffirming her belief that he is the Bay Harbor Butcher. She states he will be arraigned for Matt's murder and when Batista arrives, he will be extradited to Miami and be charged as the Bay Harbor Butcher, possibly getting the death penalty. Dexter asks her to turn the camera off and tells her to go to Kurt's cabin for proof that she was right about Kurt being a serial killer. Angela decides to go and puts Dexter back in his jail cell.

At his cell, Dexter is tormented by Debra (Jennifer Carpenter), mocking him for thinking he could get away with everything. Dexter then asks Logan for water and puts him in a headlock, demanding to be let out. However, Logan takes out his gun and tries to shoot Dexter, prompting Dexter to break Logan's neck, killing him. He takes his keys and escapes the station. He contacts Harrison, telling him to meet him at the place where the deer incident took place. Meanwhile, Angela discovers Kurt's hideout and is horrified at finding the bodies, including Molly's. She tries to contact the station, to no avail. She then contacts Teddy (David Magidoff), ordering him to contact all possible authorities. Upon discovering that Logan hasn't responded in an hour, she hurries back to the station, where she cries over Logan's corpse.

By early morning, Dexter meets up with Harrison, who notes the blood on his face. As Dexter called him from Logan's phone, Harrison deduces that Dexter killed him. Horrified and outraged, Harrison aims the hunting rifle Dexter gave him for Christmas at his father, saying that Dexter's "code" is a lie, and that he kills simply because he enjoys it. Harrison says that, if not for him, Debra and Rita would still be alive, and that he would have grown up to be normal and happy. Harrison tells Dexter to "Open your eyes and look at what you've done!" Dexter reflects on the innocent people in his life who have died because of him, and realizes that Harrison is right: he destroys everyone he gets close to, and can never be the good person and father he wants to be. He then tells Harrison that they will both be better off with him dead, and tells him to shoot him. After a moment's hesitation, Harrison shoots Dexter in the chest, and Dexter tells his son he "did good" as he falls unconscious; Dexter holds Debra's hand before she fades away.

Angela arrives at the scene. Instead of arresting Harrison, Angela gives him money and instructs him to leave town and never come back. She then alters the crime scene to make it look as though she shot Dexter in self-defense, and calls in an "officer-involved shooting". In his truck, Harrison finds the letter that Dexter wrote to Hannah 10 years before, instructing her that unless Harrison shows dark tendencies, "let me die so my son can live".

== Production ==
=== Development ===
In December 2021, it was announced that the tenth and final episode of the revived series would be titled "Sins of the Father", and was directed by executive producer Marcos Siega and written by showrunner Clyde Phillips from a story by Phillips, Alexandra Franklin and Marc Muszynski.

=== Writing ===
Michael C. Hall acknowledged the finale would surprise audiences but he felt satisfied with the ending. Before the airing of the episode, Clyde Phillips said the finale would be "surprising, inevitable and it's going to blow up the Internet", calling it the best thing he has ever written, stating that "the legitimacy, honesty, dignity and integrity of the character of Dexter that we so carefully built up over almost a decade almost required that we end the show this way." He wanted to thank the audience for sticking with the show throughout the years, "it is no secret we wanted to redeem the show after Season 8. I didn't want to screw around with the audience's head." Dexter's line, "I've never felt real love until now" served as a "real awakening in him", Dexter viewing his final words as "absolution for what Harrison's done." His closing scene originally involved Dexter pulling his hand away from Debra but Jennifer Carpenter suggested that she pull away her hand instead, which was the version used.

Back when the original series finale aired, Phillips had a different ending in mind. His ending involved Dexter waking up on an execution table at a Florida prison, with the events of the series serving as an effect of the medications administered. The scene would have certain deceased characters watching from the observation gallery, which included Arthur Mitchell, Brian Moser, María LaGuerta, James Doakes, Rita Bennett, and Lila West, and other people that Dexter killed or was partially responsible for their deaths. On deviating on the ending, Phillips said that the ending "couldn't work anymore" in the altered setting.

With Angela letting Harrison go, Phillips said her decision "was born of the horror that she had just witnessed. Her whole life has been this missing persons board and now all these women are dead. She needed humanity and maybe for maternal instinct to take over for justice — just this one moment of grace." He also said, "look at all the death that she has seen in this episode: she just saw 30 bodies in Kurt's tomb. Life is terrible and she has a chance to do something good. She knows Dexter killed Logan. It also complicates, in a surprising way, the storytelling. You don't expect it and that's another aspect of it being satisfying."

== Reception ==
=== Viewers ===
In its original American broadcast, "Sins of the Father" was seen by an estimated 0.814 million household viewers and gained a 0.16 ratings share among adults aged 18–49, according to Nielsen Media Research. This means that 0.16 percent of all households with televisions watched the episode. This was a 41% increase in viewership from the previous episode, which was watched by 0.576 million viewers with a 0.11 in the 18-49 demographics.

According to Showtime, the episode was watched by 3 million viewers across streaming and on demand platforms on its premiere, making Dexter: New Blood its most watched series in the history of the network.

=== Critical reviews ===
"Sins of the Father" received very positive reviews from critics. Matt Fowler of IGN gave the episode a "great" 8 out of 10 and wrote in his verdict, "Dexter: New Blood's excellent finale was full of necessary, wrenching confrontations and an unfortunate murder that was crucial in completing Dexter's doomed journey. Harrison needed to know that his dad's dark deeds also extended to innocent people who might reveal his secret (like when Dexter was thinking of killing Molly) and 'Sins of the Father' presented just that: Dexter's legacy of blood and how it had inadvertently harmed Harrison for nearly two decades. This was a terrific way to cap off the series and course-correct the damage done by the previous finale."

Joshua Alston of The A.V. Club gave the episode an "A" grade and wrote, "'Sins Of The Father' is an excellent finale for New Blood, and for Dexter as a series. It's more than just a decent finale by the standards Dexter set for itself during its endless creative through. 'Father' is a very strong hour of television from a show that offers them up inconsistently and very rarely does so at the end of a season. And the episode works so well because it makes use of the entirety of Dexter, not just its mythology but the public perception of the show. 'Father' succeeds because it goes places no one expected this show to go based on its history."

Nick Harley of Den of Geek gave the episode a perfect 5 star out of 5 rating and wrote, "When I started at Den of Geek, my first two review assignments were Dexter and Breaking Bad. While the latter series never lost sight that the show was ostensibly following a villain, Dexter writers fell in love with their character and turned him into a hero. It was a misstep that led to some truly awful seasons of television. If nothing else, Dexter: New Blood rights that wrong and gives the character the ending he deserves." Mary Littlejohn of TV Fanatic gave the episode a 4 star out of 5 rating and wrote, "Overall, this was a well-crafted, solid season with an appropriate conclusion to a series and a character that many people hold very close to their hearts. Though the ending may be divisive, I found it satisfying and poetic, with fewer issues than the final three seasons of the original series. The lesson here seems to be that if you get too attached to an anti-hero, be prepared for some heartache."

In a negative review, Kelly McClure of Vulture gave the episode a 2 star out of 5 rating and wrote, "From front to back, fans of the original Dexter, and the actors portraying the show's core characters, would have been better off if New Blood had never been made. It was easier to deal with the disappointment of how the original series ended when we were able to maintain Dexter's memory as an untouchable apex predator. Our wounds from that finale had all but healed. But the New Blood showrunner had to pick the scab and let it seep to where there are no fond memories of Dexter to be had."

=== Accolades ===
TVLine named Michael C. Hall the "Performer of the Week" for the week of January 15, 2022, for his performance in the episode. The site wrote, "Were we happy to see the malicious killer finally taken down, or did we feel inclined to mourn the loss of one of Peak TV's most compelling and richest antiheroes? Perhaps it was a little of both. But thanks to Hall's terrific return, we won't soon forget Dexter's brazen blaze of glory. It's the ending that we — and he — truly deserved."
