= My Bad (Dexter) =

- Dexter episode
- Episode no.: Season 5 Episode 1
- Directed by: Steve Shill
- Written by: Chip Johannessen
- Cinematography by: Romeo Tirone
- Editing by: Stewart Schill
- Original release date: September 26, 2010
- Running time: 53 minutes

Guest appearances
- Julie Benz as Rita Bennett (special guest star); Rick Peters as Elliot Larson; Bill Brochtrup as Funeral Director; Christina Robinson as Astor Bennett; Preston Bailey as Cody Bennett

Episode chronology
← Previous "The Getaway"	Next → "Hello, Bandit"
- Dexter season 5

"My Bad" is the first episode of the fifth season of the American crime drama television series Dexter. It is the 49th overall episode of the series and was written by executive producer Chip Johannessen, and directed by Steve Shill. It originally aired on Showtime on September 26, 2010.

Set in Miami, the series centers on Dexter Morgan, a forensic technician specializing in bloodstain pattern analysis for the fictional Miami Metro Police Department, who leads a secret parallel life as a vigilante serial killer, hunting down murderers who have not been adequately punished by the justice system due to corruption or legal technicalities. In the episode, Dexter grieves after discovering his wife Rita was killed by Trinity, questioning his role in other people's lives.

According to Nielsen Media Research, the episode was seen by an estimated 1.77 million household viewers and gained a 0.8/2 ratings share among adults aged 18–49. The episode received highly positive reviews from critics, with Michael C. Hall receiving praise for his performance in the episode.

== Plot ==
Immediately after discovering his wife Rita (Julie Benz) murdered in their bathtub, a victim of Arthur Mitchell (John Lithgow), Dexter (Michael C. Hall) sits on his front lawn in a state of shock, while holding his infant son Harrison in his arms. The police, along with Debra (Jennifer Carpenter), arrive at the house and question Dexter, but Dexter, in his shock, only responds by whispering "It was me", as he blames himself for not killing Arthur Mitchell when he first had the chance. This comment attracts the suspicion of the FBI, who have also arrived at the scene.

As the murder is the work of the Trinity Killer, LaGuerta (Lauren Vélez) announces that Miami Metro must hand over the case to the FBI, much to the resentment of most of the department, who feel that Rita's death has hit them close to home. Meanwhile, Dexter manages to regain his senses enough to notice that the spirit of Harry (James Remar) has failed to appear and give him advice. At the same time Quinn (Desmond Harrington) catches a glimpse of the neighbor, Elliot (Rick Peters), in tears over the murder, and finds it puzzling compared to Dexter's relative lack of response.

Faced with the arrangements for Rita's funeral, having to talk with the FBI and telling the bad news to Rita's children, Dexter remains in an absent-minded state, while he reminisces about the first time he met Rita, leaving it to Debra to make all the arrangements. While she cleans the site of the murder together with Quinn, the emotional pressure gets to her, and breaking down in front of him, the two end up having sex. Meanwhile, Dexter breaks it to Astor and Cody, who have arrived home from a trip to Disney World with their grandparents, that Rita has been killed. Astor takes it the harder of the two, and angrily accuses Dexter of failing to protect Rita, telling him "We are better off without you!" Meanwhile, Quinn, about to leave Dexter's house with Debra, talks to Elliot. Elliot reveals to Quinn that, shortly before Rita's murder, Dexter confronted Elliot and punched him in the face for kissing Rita. He attempts to reveal this to LaGuerta, but she reprimands him, both for interfering with an FBI investigation and for suspecting Dexter.

Dexter, taking Astor's words to heart, decides to abandon the city, leaving Harrison in the care of Debra, also deciding not to attend his FBI interview and Rita's funeral. But as he sails out from the bay, he runs out of gas, and stops at a refuelling station. Finding the station abandoned, Dexter encounters Rankin, an unpleasant, loud-mouthed customer who insults him. Dexter follows him into the bathroom, bludgeoning him to death in a fit of rage. Harry's spirit appears before Dexter, surprised by his sudden outburst of raw human emotion and tells him that it is okay to let his feelings out, leading Dexter to break down in a primal scream. He realizes that he genuinely loved Rita, and returns to Miami to appear at her funeral, giving her a heartfelt eulogy before she is laid to rest.

== Production ==
=== Development ===
The episode was written by executive producer Chip Johannessen, and was directed by Steve Shill. This was Johannessen's first writing credit, and Shill's sixth directing credit.

== Reception ==
=== Viewers ===
In its original American broadcast, "My Bad" was seen by an estimated 1.77 million household viewers with a 0.8/2 in the 18–49 demographics. This means that 0.8 percent of all households with televisions watched the episode, while 2 percent of all of those watching television at the time of the broadcast watched it. This was a 32% decrease in viewership from the previous episode, which was watched by an estimated 2.58 million household viewers with a 1.3/3 in the 18–49 demographics.

=== Critical reviews ===
"My Bad" received highly positive reviews from critics. Matt Fowler of IGN gave the episode a "good" 7.5 out of 10, and wrote, "The funeral scene might have made for a natural opening scene for this episode if Dexter was adhering to its own usual framework. Instead, Executive Producer, Sara Colleton, and new showrunner, Chip Johannessen, felt the need to honor Rita's character by giving the audience a chance to grieve and say their own farewells. Personally, I appreciated Rita, but I didn't really need to grieve for her as much as this show thinks I did. I enjoyed what she meant to Dexter himself, but beyond that I didn't need to watch everyone on the show, piecemeal, discover the horrible news of her death."

Emily St. James of The A.V. Club gave the episode an "A–" grade and wrote, "There's no real sense of where Dexter goes from here – unlike in the other seasons, the show doesn't introduce a major new arc or villain – but as a season premiere, this works fantastically. Dealing with a character's death, particularly when that character had worn out his or her welcome, can be a tricky proposition for a long-running show, but Dexter finds a way to do it that suggests the darkness just over the horizon and that there will be no redemption for this man. For as goofy as the show can play him, it hasn't forgotten that he's a force of pure destruction, and that's a relief." Lizzy Goodman of Vulture wrote, "Dexter has spent four seasons trying to coax his two conflicting personae into coexistence, and so far he's failed. He now seems determined to try again. But questions abound: What do we make of the fact that Dexter gains clarity in this episode only after committing a murder that breaks his own code?"

Alan Sepinwall of HitFix wrote, "a great start to the season, and I like the idea that this year won't have one Big Bad – because who could top Lithgow? – and as much as Dexter misses Rita, the show itself is better off without her after the way she was written the last couple of seasons." Sandra Gonzalez of Entertainment Weekly wrote, "Back on the mainland, Dexter came back to attend Rita's funeral, looking out of place in khakis and a blue shirt. Among his ponderings during the eulogy: "She had a big heart, big enough for the both of us, had to be, I wasn't even human when we first met." But, readers, is he human now? And if so, is that even more dangerous?"

Billy Grifter of Den of Geek wrote, "Dexter, I've decided, is like one of those people you don’t mind turning up unannounced at your door. The ones that you're welcome to see and never overstay their welcome. It's great to have this show back on TV, and I can't wait for the next eleven slices, because the track record of this show dictates that they'll come easily off the bone." Gina DiNunno of TV Guide wrote, "Everyone is restless standing around Rita's casket at the cemetery — especially Deb. Just before Quinn is able to tell Deb about the Elliot-Dexter thing, Dexter pulls up. The funeral begins and Dexter gives a very touching eulogy that seems as though it actually came from the heart."

Claire Zulkey of Los Angeles Times wrote, "As always, the drama at Miami Metro is a distant second to that in Dexter's life, but thus far it doesn't seem to compete with our favorite serial killer, who has to pick up the pieces and move on, or at least appear that way." Television Without Pity gave the episode an "A" grade.
