= Dexter Is Delicious =

2010 novel by Jeff Lindsay

- Author: Jeff Lindsay
- Language: English
- Series: Dexter Morgan
- Genre: Crime novel
- Publisher: Orion Books Limited
- Publication date: July 2010
- Publication place: United States
- Media type: Print (Hardback)
- Pages: 368
- ISBN: 978-0-385-53235-8
- Preceded by: Dexter by Design
- Followed by: Double Dexter

Dexter Is Delicious is a 2010 crime/horror novel written by Jeff Lindsay, and the fifth book in the Dexter book series. The book was released in the UK on July 8, 2010 and September 7, 2010 in the United States, following no-longer-sociopathic vigilante Dexter Morgan as he experiences genuine love and emotions for the first time upon the birth of his daughter, attempting to retire from his hobby while investigating a cannibal coven with his estranged siblings.

The book contains elements of cannibalism. Lindsay said of the research he put into writing the novel, "There are cannibal chat groups...just dying to give you a recipe for how to prepare and cook human flesh."

== Plot ==
Nine months after the previous book, Dexter and Rita's daughter Lily is born. The birth brings remarkable changes in Dexter; apart from feeling genuine love and emotion for the first time, he also no longer feels his "Dark Passenger's" compulsion to kill and vows to swear off his dark hobby in order to be a good father to his daughter. Dexter is called to a crime scene by his sister Deborah, who is in the middle of a jurisdictional fight with the FBI over a reported kidnapping. Dexter believes that the large quantity of blood found there was planted, and that the missing girl in question, Samantha Aldovar, is faking her disappearance in order to get money from her parents. Dexter runs tests and discovers that the blood type does not match Samantha's.

Deb and Dexter go to Samantha's private school and speak with her principal, who is initially reluctant to disclose any information. This changes when the principal discovers that Samantha's friend, Tyler Spanos, a wild child, is also missing. Subsequent interviews with their friends indicate that they were both befriended by a young man with teeth filed down like fangs, and that only a few dentists in Miami offered such a service. Their prime suspect is Bobby Acosta, the son of a wealthy city official who already rescued Bobby from felony prosecutions.

Dexter is surprised when his brother Brian, whom Dexter last saw several years previously, brings Astor and Cody home from school. Brian quickly ingratiates himself with Dexter's family, who rapidly start to adore him - much to Dexter's dismay. Dexter soon receives another call from Deb and arrives at a crime scene where someone was apparently cooked and eaten. DNA from the gnawed bones matches that of Tyler Spanos. One of the detectives working under Deb uses his contacts and arrests two Haitian men, who swear that they saw Bobby leaving Tyler's car at a chop shop.

Deb and Dexter arrest Victor Chapin, another young man with artificial fangs, but are forced to release him when a public defender shows up. Dexter, in a fit of overprotective fury over his daughter, stalks and kills Chapin. Just before dying, Chapin admits to having taken part in eating Tyler. Things get worse when the remains of Deke, Deb's obnoxious partner, are found partially eaten. Searching a nearby trash heap, Dexter finds Deke's blood-soaked shirt and a souvenir chip from a local goth nightclub called Fang. The duo force their way into the club and find Bobby, but are thrown out by the club's manager. They wait until the club closes, after which Dexter breaks in to search for Samantha.

Dexter remembers that he had previously considered the club manager as a victim, after a large number of migrants vanished after working at Fang. Dexter eventually finds Samantha in a large refrigerator. However, rather than follow Dexter to freedom, Samantha locks them both inside. Samantha reveals that she desires to be eaten, and that she and Tyler volunteered to let the cannibals cook and eat them. The two are then taken to a trailer in the Everglades, where they are left with only a jug of water. After drinking MDMA-laced water, Dexter and Samantha become euphoric and have sex multiple times. Shortly afterward, Deb and the MPD arrive and arrest the cannibals, but end up killing the club manager. Samantha, irate at being rescued, threatens to falsely accuse Dexter of rape as revenge for ruining her fantasy.

The next day, Deb tells Dexter that Samantha has run off again. They approach Bobby's father, Joe, who refuses to turn his son in. However, Bobby's stepmother, Alana, privately reveals that Bobby is at an abandoned amusement park owned by his father. There, Dexter, Deb, and Deb's boyfriend, Kyle Chutsky, are captured by a cannibal "coven" led by Alana. Deb and Chutsky are taken away, leaving Dexter to watch Alana grill a slice of Samantha, who is semi-conscious. As Alana prepares to carve Dexter, his brother Brian (who had been working for the cannibals) shoots her and other members of the coven. Brian cuts Dexter loose and reluctantly helps him rescue Deb and Chutsky. While fleeing, they check on Samantha, who is dying of her wounds; Dexter assures her that her flesh was "delicious," allowing her to die content.

Chutsky breaks up with Deb, feeling that he had nearly gotten her killed. Upon waking up on the way to the hospital, she reveals that she is pregnant. She later prepares to give birth despite Chutsky's carefully orchestrated disappearance. Dexter decides that even though he now feels emotions like normal people, he can't stand by and be preyed upon when he can do something about it. He decides that the best he can do for Deb is to honor an earlier request of hers and "take care" of Bobby Acosta.
