= Double Dexter =

Book by Jeff Lindsay

- First edition (US)
- Author: Jeff Lindsay
- Language: English
- Series: Dexter Morgan
- Genre: Crime novel, Mystery
- Publisher: Doubleday (US); Orion Books (UK)
- Publication date: October 2011
- Publication place: United States
- Media type: Print (hardback)
- Pages: 320
- ISBN: 978-0-385-53237-2
- Preceded by: Dexter Is Delicious
- Followed by: Dexter's Final Cut

Double Dexter is the sixth novel written by Jeff Lindsay, and the sixth book in the Dexter book series about Dexter Morgan, a serial killer who targets serial killers, pedophiles, and other murderers. The book was released on October 18, 2011, and received a universally positive critical reception, praised as the best Dexter novel so far.

== Plot ==
As he is dismembering a pedophile, Dexter Morgan spots a witness who flees in a battered Honda car. He begins to spend his evenings hunting for the car. His wife Rita, suspecting an affair, starts drinking wine. Meanwhile, Deborah manages to solve a series of ritualistic murders targeting Miami cops. The resulting media attention spills over onto Dexter, whose name and picture are publicized for the first time. After recognizing Dexter, the witness e-mails and attempts to blackmail him. Dexter studies the witness's blog, finding no clues other than his ex-wife's first initial. Dexter begins to think of his antagonist as the Shadow, after his online moniker.

Dexter eventually finds the Honda belonging to Alissa Elan, the Shadow's ex-wife. He returns at night but finds that the Shadow – Bernard Elan – has anticipated his visit, mutilated Alissa in imitation of Dexter's style, and called the police when he arrived. Dexter narrowly escapes. Bernard, a skilled computer hacker, alters relevant databases to indicate that he died two years ago. Later, Dexter's coworker Camilla Figg is found beaten to death, casting doubt on Deborah's arrest. Dexter notices differences in the cop killings, but Hood, the detective in charge, ignores him. It emerges that Camilla had hundreds of photographs of Dexter, having had an obsessive crush on him. Hood makes Dexter the prime suspect.

Another message from Bernard confirms that he killed Camilla. Dexter eventually learns that he is now using the alias Doug Crowley, but cannot kill him because of Hood's surveillance. He asks his brother Brian to do so, only for Brian to mistakenly kill the real Doug Crowley. Dexter takes his family on a trip to Key West, where Rita attends a foreclosure auction; Hood and Bernard both follow. Bernard kills Hood and leaves him in Dexter's hotel suite, then takes Astor and Cody to Garden Key. However, Dexter reaches the island first and manages to subdue Bernard with Astor's help. Bernard is tossed overboard and is killed by a shark. After returning from Key West, Dexter breaks into the deceased Hood's apartment and plants evidence on his computer, implying he killed Camila, clearing himself of suspicion.

== Reception ==
The Telegraph said of the book, "Hilariously gruesome finale....All this ought to be gross nonsense but Jeff Lindsay’s cynical wit makes it fly". The Orlando Sentinel called it the best book of the series yet, saying the book "takes a tremendous leap forward as the author utilizes believable storytelling and large doses of dark humor" and "strongest outing as he richly delves into Dexter's very scarred psyche".
