= Brian Moser (Dexter) =

American fictional character

- First appearance: Novels: Darkly Dreaming Dexter (2004); Television: "Love American Style" (2006)
- Last appearance: Novels: Dexter is Dead (2015); Television: "And Justice for All..." (2025)
- Created by: Jeff Lindsay
- Portrayed by: Christian Camargo; Roby Attal (young; Dexter: Original Sin); Brandon Killham (child); Xander Mateo (child; Dexter: Original Sin)

In-universe information
- Aliases: Television only: Rudy Cooper
- Nicknames: Biney; Television only: Ice Truck Killer; Novels only: Tamiami Slasher/Butcher
- Gender: Male
- Occupation: Television only: Prosthetist; Novels only: Drug cartel Realtor
- Family: Laura Moser (mother); Joseph Driscoll (father); Dexter Morgan (brother); Harrison Morgan (nephew); Novels only: Lily Anne Morgan (niece)
- Significant others: Television only: Debra Morgan (season 1)
- Nationality: American

Brian Moser is a fictional character and former antagonist of the Dexter novel series by American author Jeff Lindsay, and one of the main antagonists of the Dexter television franchise. He is portrayed by Christian Camargo in the original series and Roby Attal in the 2024 prequel, Dexter: Original Sin. In both the novel and television series, Brian is Dexter Morgan's biological brother and he plays a large part in helping Dexter uncover the truth of what happened to him as a child. Unlike Dexter, Brian does not have a moral code that keeps him from killing innocent people, being more mentally scarred than his brother due to growing up in foster care and a mental hospital.

== Development ==
Brian Moser was created by Jeff Lindsay for the novel Darkly Dreaming Dexter. During the development of the first season, series director Michael Cuesta wanted Jeremy Renner as Brian, but a mix of scheduling conflicts with the horror film 28 Weeks Later (2007) and Renner wanting to avoid typecasting after playing Jeffrey Dahmer in the 2002 biographical film Dahmer ceased those plans. Christian Camargo, a then-unknown theatre actor, auditioned for the role of Brian and got the role. Camargo returned in season 2 as a guest star in the episode "Waiting to Exhale".

Camargo once again returned as Brian Moser for the sixth season, appearing in the episodes "Just Let Go" and "Nebraska". In 2011, showrunner Scott Buck said about Brian's return that "it's actually something we've been talking about over the course of several seasons. We were just always looking for the right opportunity to do it. We know that [Brian Moser reappearing] is really something we can only do once, so we really didn't want to waste it. We were looking to create the exact right story and situation, and it finally presented itself. We were very happy to bring Christian [Camargo] back into the fold."

Brian Moser reappeared in the prequel series Dexter: Original Sin (2024-2025), played as a child by Xander Mateo and as an adult by Roby Attal. In an interview, Attal said he didn't know he was playing Brian until after he filming his first episode. Brian would've had a larger role in the second season of Original Sin had the series not been cancelled.

On June 12, 2025, Camargo uploaded a TikTok video showing him preparing for a project, with the end teasing a return as Brian in the then-upcoming Dexter: Resurrection, showing the iconic attire that Brian wore in the season one finale "Born Free". Camargo appeared in Resurrection's season finale, "And Justice for All..."

== Character ==
=== Biography ===
Brian was born to Laura Moser and Joseph Driscoll on July 17, 1968. His mother gave birth to a second son, Dexter, on February 1, 1971. They grew up with their mother, estranged from their father, at 1235 Mangrove Drive in Miami, Florida. Brian was very protective and caring of his brother, though showed signs of psychopathy such as killing small animals. On October 3, 1973, four people, including Laura, were found dismembered via chainsaw inside a cargo container at the Port of Miami. Brian and Dexter witnessed their mother being butchered, altering their psyche and shaping them into future killers. Dexter and Brian were taken in by the Morgan family, but after Brian attempted to suffocate their infant daughter, Debra, he was deemed too unstable and was sent to and kicked out of multiple foster homes before being transferred to a psychiatric facility in Tampa. He was diagnosed with antisocial personality disorder.

Due to seeing his mother being dismembered in front of him, Brian developed an amputee fetish. After eventually stealing the alias, Rudy Cooper, he began working as a prosthetist. According to Brian, his mother lost her legs in a car accident, and by becoming a doctor he could overcome the feeling of inability of not having been able to help her. Brian is shown to be capable of masking his true identity, even more so than Dexter (Michael C. Hall), to the point that Debra (Jennifer Carpenter) begins a romantic relationship with him. Unbeknownst to her, he was only using her to get closer to Dexter and never felt any real emotion towards her.

=== Modus operandi ===
Prior to the events of season one, Brian's victims were people who he believed had wronged him in life, such as multiple foster kids who abused him during his stints at their homes. During the first season, Brian mainly killed sex workers. Brian deviated slightly from his pattern during season one, when he killed his father and attempted to kill Angel Batista. Brian usually roamed at night to scour for victims and find a hooker, eventually inviting them to his apartment. When he killed his father and the neighbor, he pretended to be a cable repairman and was able to enter their homes without suspicion.

When his victims arrived at his apartment, Brian would engage in sexual activities with them before putting them in a chokehold to render them unconscious. Brian would strap his victims to a motorized table, located in a custom refrigeration unit inside his apartment. He would use the table to hoist the victim upside-down, then severing their jugular, having them bleed out, and collecting the blood in a bucket. It is revealed that he was hoarding the blood of his victims to use it at a later date in order to stage a blood-soaked crime scene to trigger a traumatic memory of Dexter's. Brian also used methods of suffocation, use of a firearm and insulin injection to kill other victims.

Brian would use surgical tools, such as electrically powered saws, to dismember the victim. He would separate the body into several parts and wrap them in brown paper. He would transport the body parts using a large refrigerated truck, later earning him the moniker "Ice Truck Killer", and take them to specific places. Brian would display the bodies in public, laid out from head to toe.

== Brian in the television series ==
=== Season one ===
Three dismembered bodies are found, leading to Miami Metro Police suspecting a serial killer. Dexter proposes the idea that the killer is using a refrigerated vehicle to transport the body parts and encounters one while driving. When Dexter returns to his apartment, he finds the head of a toy doll. He sees this as the killer inviting him to play and accepts it. Later, Debra tells Dexter she has found a refrigerated truck with human fingertips inside, painted the same as the doll's. When a fourth victim is discovered at an ice hockey arena, CCTV footage shows security guard Tony Tucci (Brad William Henke) leaving the body parts. Originally thought to be the killer, Tucci's severed hand is found on a beach. Various clues leads Dexter to an abandoned hospital, where he finds Tucci strapped to an operating table. Tucci is later treated by a prosthetist named Rudy Cooper. Debra blindfolds Tucci to gain more insight. When he states that the person who took him captive often used throat lozenges, they find a wrapper and identify a partial fingerprint. Dexter kills a couple that were engaged in smuggling immigrants at a car salvage yard. Later, he is called to the salvage yard's crime scene, where he finds the wife lying in the trailer he killed them in. He deduces that the Ice Truck Killer retrieved the body from the ocean. He notices a smiley face etched into one of his blood slides, realising that the killer is not trying to expose him.

After Neil Perry (Sam Witwer) is exposed as the killer, Dexter is sad that his friend will be gone. However, after an exchange with Perry, Dexter realizes he is not the real killer. Debra begins dating Rudy. Perry reveals that he pretended to be the killer for attention. Dexter keeps in touch with the killer by sending a message through Craigslist. Rudy responds to Dexter's message, revealing him to be the Ice Truck Killer. Dexter learns that his biological father, Joseph Driscoll, has died, leaving his belongings to him. Dexter travels to the house with his girlfriend Rita (Julie Benz), and Debra and Rudy help. Driscoll's neighbor Irma Holt (Jeanette Miller) recognises Rudy as the cable repairman, who last visited Driscoll. Later after the others leave Driscoll's house, Rudy returns as the cable repairman to discreetly kill Holt. Dexter is called to a crime scene at a hotel room and sees the entire room soaked in blood, triggering a repressed memory. Debra proposes that it is the work of the Ice Truck Killer. Angel Batista (David Zayas) speaks to a prostitute, who has a prosthetic hand with fingernails with similar paint of the Ice Truck Killer. Theorizing that the killer is an acrotomophiliac, he speaks to Rudy, who later attacks him in a parking lot but is elbowed in the face, causing a cut lip. He tracks down the prostitute and kills her. Dexter finds out that he is connected to the Ice Truck Killer involving his mother's murder from 1973. Rudy convinces Debra to join him on his boat, proposing to her, but strangles her unconscious. Dexter finds out Rudy is the killer after linking the cut on his lip to the blood on Batista's collar.

Dexter finds a clue that leads him to his childhood home, and has flashbacks revealing that Rudy, whose real name is Brian Moser, is Dexter's biological brother. He reveals to him that they both witnessed their mother's murder, but while Dexter repressed the memory, Brian didn't and was instead put into a mental hospital. Brian talks to Dexter inside their childhood home and tries to persuade Dexter to kill Debra with him, so he can be "free", but Dexter stops him. Police arrive and Brian escapes through a trap door. At night, Debra appears to be sleeping in Dexter's bed. Brian breaks in and tries to stab her, only to find a fake body in her place. Dexter strangles Brian with a garrote. Dexter takes Brian to his own apartment and straps him to the table he used to kill his victims. After an emotional conversation, Dexter slits Brian's throat, leaving him upside down and staging his death as a suicide.

=== Season two ===
Five weeks after Brian's death, Dexter has trouble killing due to the guilt of killing Brian while Debra is also struggling to recover. The discovery of Dexter's victims in a nearby harbor makes him increasingly stressed. While at Paul's funeral, he hallucinates Brian, realizing he is watching over him. Dexter goes to the marina, deciding he needs to move forward in order to kill, which, involves letting go of Brian. He removes the doll head from his keychain, his hallucination of Brian fading out.

=== Season six ===
Vince Masuka's (C. S. Lee) new intern, Ryan Chambers (Brea Grant), who is obsessed with the Ice Truck Killer case, steals Brian's prosthetic arm and sells it online. When Masuka finds out, he fires her, and replaces her with Louis Greene (Josh Cooke), who later steals the arms and sells it to Dexter out of pettiness.

After Dexter kills Nick, he sees a hallucinatory Brian applauding him. As Dexter dumps Nick's body into the ocean, the presence of Brian tries to get him to accept his inner darkness. Dexter visits Kearney, Nebraska after learning the Trinity Killer killed his wife and daughter, confusing Dexter as he knows that he is dead. Brian suggests that Trinity's surviving son Jonah (Brando Eaton) is following his father's footsteps. During the trip, Brian persuades Dexter to be more carefree, leading to him hooking up with a store clerk and stealing her pistol, recklessly shooting it in the street. He meets with Jonah at a hardware store and later confronts him at his house, causing Jonah to flee.

After Dexter leaves his car at a motel, the owner, Norm, becomes anxious when Dexter stumbles upon his marijuana farm. Norm tries to extort Dexter for money; Dexter hallucinates Brian killing Norm. He meets Jonah at the hardware store, where he reveals he that his sister committed suicide and that he killed his mother due to her constant nagging. Dexter is surprised when Jonah wants him to kill him. Brian tries to persuade Dexter, but he refuses, realizing Jonah feels remorse. He gets into his car, tells Jonah to forgive himself, and drives through Brian's spirit, fading it from existence.

=== Dexter: Original Sin ===
Set in 1991, the series follows a young adult Dexter (Patrick Gibson) as he transitions into a serial killer. Harry (Christian Slater) and LaGuerta (Christina Milian) are working on a recent serial killer theory, they find a new victim in Tampa, therapist Paul Petrie. Harry realises that one of Petrie's patients was Brian Moser and hides the file from LaGuerta. At a retirement home, one of the residents, Barbara Plimpton (Kathleen Rose Perkins), is joined by a young man (Roby Attal), who introduces himself as Brian. After the home's bingo game is over, Brian invites Barbara to dine with him. He reveals his full name as Brian Moser and sedates her. On a rooftop, Brian straps Barbara to a pole, reprimanding her for taking him away from Dexter. She pleads as Brian dismembers her with a chainsaw.

During a therapy session, Brian believes he has made enough progress to see Dexter, but Petrie, his therapist, disagrees. Brian kills Petrie and steals his car. While investigating Barbara's crime scene, Harry notices Brian on a nearby rooftop. Harry confronts Brian at gunpoint, connecting him to the recent murders—he was staging them so he could watch Dexter. Brian scolds Harry for not telling Dexter about what happened, refusing to surrender, Brian tells Harry to kill him, as he hesitates, Brian knocks him unconscious and flees. While Harry and Debra (Molly Brown) celebrate Dexter's promotion at a restaurant, Brian somberly watches from outside.

=== Dexter: Resurrection ===
Leon Prater (Peter Dinklage) walks Dexter through his collection of artifacts belonging to notorious serial killers. In the vault, is the table that belongs to the Ice Truck Killer, which Prater explains is the table where Brian supposedly took his own life.

In "Course Correction", Dexter confides to fellow killer Gareth Pike (David Dastmalchian) about his brother and wonders what could’ve been had he and Brian found each other earlier in life.

While trapped inside the vault, Dexter mourns Batista's death. He hears someone applauding and turns around to see his brother. Brian mocks Dexter for being emotionally attached to Batista, stating he should listen to his blood brother. However, Dexter coldly responds that he's glad he killed Brian while he had the chance. Brian continues to taunt him for his situation, leading to an enraged Dexter throwing a chainsaw at Brian, fading his vision of him. Brian's kill table is later used by Dexter to kill Prater.

== Difference from the novels ==
In the novels, Brian is known as the "Tamiami Slasher" due to the location of his victims. He does not date and use Debra (Deborah in the novels) to get closer to Dexter. His professions range from working with drug cartels to realty. The most notable difference from the series is that Dexter does not kill Brian; in the first novel, he helps Brian escape, and he becomes a recurring character who assists Dexter in dire situations.

In Darkly Dreaming Dexter, due to the first season of the show being largely based on the first novel, the main plot is the same. However, Brian mimics Dexter's killings, driving Dexter to a point of insanity, believing he is subconsciously committing the murders. In contrast to the show, when Dexter arrives at the cargo container his mother was murdered in, he does find Brian holding Deborah captive. Dexter's colleague, Midgia LaGuerta, arrives. Brian is disappointed that Dexter doesn't want to kill Deborah, but Dexter lets Brian kill LaGuerta and helps him escape. In Dexter is Delicious, Brian later returns, to Dexter's surprise, by bringing home Astor and Cody, who begin to adore him, along with Rita. While Dexter is being held captive by cannibals, Brian arrives, freeing him. In Double Dexter, Dexter hires Brian's help to kill somebody for him, only for Brian to mistakenly kill the wrong person. In Dexter Is Dead, after Dexter is falsely accused of murder and molestation, he is imprisoned. Brian bails Dexter out and gets him a lawyer but is being targeted by a drug cartel he had stolen from. The cartel tries to kill Dexter in order to get to Brian, eventually kidnapping Dexter's children. Dexter, Deborah and Brian team up, locate, and save the children, though Brian is killed by a bomb he planted.

== Reception and legacy ==
Christian Camargo's portrayal of Brian has received widespread acclaim. IGN awarded him "Best Villain" in 2006, stating he "is a great reflection of his archenemy [Dexter]". Brian is considered one of the best villains in the series and has a large online fanbase, commonly seen at the top of lists of best Dexter villains with season 4's Arthur Mitchell. Shawn Laib of Den of Geek said "no villain is more reflective of Dexter's own morality while also depicting realistic serial killer tendencies than Moser." At a fan convention, James Remar, who plays Harry Morgan, said Brian was the "creepiest" villain in the series. In the years since Dexter, Camargo has received momentos from fans, including prosthetic hands with painted fingernails.

The decision to kill off Brian Moser in the season one finale "Born Free" despite him surviving in the novels has received mixed reception, as many feel like it was a missed opportunity killing such a compelling villain, and feeling like Brian was underused, with Greg MacArthur of Screen Rant saying "Brian's death eliminated a variety of possibilities for the franchise." In a Reddit AMA (Ask Me Anything) featuring showrunner Clyde Phillips and writer Scott Reynolds, when asked if they regretted killing Brian early, Reynolds said "We don't because in OS [Original Sin] we're able to revisit him and he's still alive in OS," while Phillips responded "It's also our job to put ourselves in a corner and figure out how to get out of it, and killing Brian was necessary to the storytelling for that season."
