= Dexter in the Dark =

Book by Jeff Lindsay

- Original US 2007 Cover
- Author: Jeff Lindsay
- Language: English
- Genre: Crime novel, supernatural
- Publication date: 2007
- Publication place: United States
- Media type: Print (hardback & paperback)
- ISBN: 0-385-51833-1 (US); ISBN 0-7528-8509-X (UK)
- Preceded by: Dearly Devoted Dexter
- Followed by: Dexter by Design

Dexter in the Dark is a 2007 novel written by American writer Jeff Lindsay. The third book in the Dexter series following serial killer killer Dexter Morgan, it was preceded by the 2004 novel Darkly Dreaming Dexter—which formed the basis of the Showtime television series Dexter—and Dearly Devoted Dexter, its 2005 sequel. An audiobook narrated by Nick Landrum was released in September 2007.

The first novel in the series to explore supernatural elements, Dexter in the Dark was released September 18, 2007, in the United States and October 3, 2007, in the United Kingdom. The Season 1 DVD of the Dexter television series allows access to the first two chapters of Dexter in the Dark when viewed on a computer, additionally revealing that the book was originally scheduled to be released earlier in the year.

== Plot ==
Dexter in the Dark original UK 2007 version.

Dexter Morgan investigates a double homicide at the UM campus, where two female students have been found burned and beheaded. Their heads are replaced by the ceramic heads of bulls. Something about this uncharacteristically frightens Dexter's "Dark Passenger" into silence, leaving him to solve the crime on his own. As a series of similar murders takes place, members of a mysterious cult begin stalking Dexter, believing his Dark Passenger to be a threat to them.

Dexter soon begins to question the Dark Passenger, as he slowly realizes that it's a true entity unto itself, possibly an offspring of the ancient god Moloch. While attempting to dispatch a killer who had been stalking him, Dexter becomes frightened and is unable to go through with the deed. He soon realizes that the Dark Passenger had given him an unusual amount of confidence and an almost supernatural awareness of the world around him; now that it's gone, he feels vulnerable for the first time in his life. Dexter begins to develop sadness and anger, emotions that were once suppressed by the Dark Passenger. While missing the helpful clues and hints of the Dark Passenger, Dexter feeds off of his newfound emotions to find some balance in his life as well as solve the mystery unfolding around him.

Meanwhile, traumatized by their abusive biological father, Dexter's soon-to-be stepchildren Astor and Cody Bennett have developed homicidal tendencies similar to his own. Dexter intends to teach them the "Code of Harry", which his adoptive father used to help him hide his dark nature, blend in with normal people, and channel his sociopathic urges to rid society of killers who deserve to die. While Cody and Astor are eager to learn, Dexter informs them that they aren't ready yet and still have years of training left before they'll be able to inflict any real human suffering.

The cult kidnaps Astor and Cody, thereby forcing Dexter to engage them head-on. However, the cult soon captures Dexter through a supernatural captivation of music. Though confined in a small storage closet, Dexter escapes and encounters an old man who's the current avatar of Moloch. Though Dexter is instantly humbled and frightened by Moloch, he continuously mocks the malignant spirit, which in turn entrances the trio and orders them to be sacrificed in a flaming pit. Dexter manages to snap out of his trance and opens fire on the cult members. Moloch takes Astor hostage and threatens to kill her, only for Cody to stab him in the back with his own ceremonial knife.

Dexter laments that, due to having killed at such an early age, Cody's journey will now be more difficult. Weeks pass, and Dexter is left alone to accept life without his Dark Passenger. At his wedding to Rita Bennett, Dexter falls into a state of depression as he thinks about how painful his life is going to be in its banality. Just then, the Dark Passenger returns, brought on by Dexter's immense suffering, and Dexter is made whole again in the final paragraphs of the novel.

== Narrative device ==
This is the first of Jeff Lindsay's "Dexter" series not narrated exclusively in the first-person point of view. Along with Dexter's first-person narration, the novel includes third person narration from two other points of view. One is a person called the Watcher, a member of the cult that follows and observes Dexter. The other is a mythical, godlike entity called "IT" (revealed to be Moloch) which has existed since the beginning of time and is similar in various ways to the Dark Passenger. IT takes great pleasure in entering creatures as a "passenger" and making them kill other creatures, and it works to create other murderous entities similar to itself, but soon turns against many of them, causing them to flee. IT and its offspring go to war, and IT prevails. Some of IT's remaining children stay in hiding, fearing IT's power.
