= Dexter's Final Cut =

Book by Jeff Lindsay

- First edition
- Author: Jeff Lindsay
- Language: English
- Series: Dexter Morgan
- Genre: Crime novel
- Publisher: Orion Books Limited
- Publication date: September 17, 2013
- Publication place: United States
- Media type: Print (hardback)
- Pages: 368
- ISBN: 978-0385536516
- Preceded by: Double Dexter
- Followed by: Dexter Is Dead

Dexter's Final Cut is the seventh novel written by Jeff Lindsay, and the penultimate book in the Dexter book series about Dexter Morgan, a serial killer who primarily targets other serial killers. The book was released on September 17, 2013. Responding to the lack of alliteration on the title in comparison to the previous ones in the series, Lindsay has stated, "It's because this novel is very different than the previous, shockingly so..."

== Plot ==
When a cable TV network comes to Miami to shoot a new crime show, Dexter Morgan and his sister Deborah are assigned as "technical advisors." The two are followed by the stars to research their roles: Deborah is followed by female lead Jackie Forrest, while Dexter is left with over-the-hill star Robert Chase. Sensing a strangeness in Robert, Dexter keeps him at arm's length. Shortly afterwards, the bodies of dead women begin turning up in Miami, all of whom bear a striking resemblance to Jackie. Dexter is assigned to protect Jackie in her hotel room. The "Dark Passenger" eventually compels Dexter to pursue the lead suspect, an obsessive fan of Jackie's.

While working the latest murder, Dexter notices a man fitting the description of Jackie's stalker watching the scene from a kayak. Stealing away to his boat, Dexter slips alongside him and makes the kill. Dexter initially assumes that Jackie is safe, only for her assistant Kathy to be murdered in the room below hers. Despite seemingly fitting the pattern of the earlier murders, Dexter notices several errors. That night, Dexter and Jackie start a brief but intense affair. Dexter thinks he may have finally fallen in love with Jackie, and considers leaving his wife Rita and their children, alienating Deborah on telling her as such.

Dexter is called onto the set to appear as a minor character. There, he gets a panicked call from Rita and learns that Astor has disappeared. Moments later, Dexter finds Jackie's dead body in her trailer. Upon interrogating the show's director, Dexter learns that Robert is a pedophile. He realizes that Kathy was silenced after catching Robert in a compromising position with Astor; he then killed Jackie when she found out what he had done. Following a hunch, Dexter travels to his new house. Robert catches him sneaking in and knocks him unconscious.

Waking some time later, Dexter finds Astor and Robert together. Robert has lured Astor with promises of stardom, and she appears to be ready to help him kill Dexter. Thinking quickly, Dexter tells Astor that Robert will be caught and sent to jail, and is therefore useless to her. When Robert tries to take Astor as a hostage, she stabs him to death. Dexter realizes that circumstantial evidence implicates him as Jackie's and Robert's murderer, and that the only person who can exonerate him is Rita. However, he discovers that Rita is dead, having been murdered by Robert. Dexter realizes that his luck has finally run out, and waits for the police to arrive.

== In other media ==
The plot-point of Rita being murdered and Dexter returning home to find her was previously shown in the Dexter television series as the fourth season finale several years before this book was published. Dexter realizing his time is up also happened in Dexter: New Blood.
