= Blood Drive =

Blood Drive may refer to:

== Donation ==
- Blood drive, campaigns and special events to solicit blood donations

== Games ==
- Blood Drive (video game), a 2010 vehicular combat video game for Xbox 360 and PlayStation 3
- Corpse Party: Blood Drive, a 2014 survival horror adventure video game for PlayStation Vita

== Music ==
- Blood Drive (album), of 2013 by ASG

== Television ==
- Blood Drive (TV series), Syfy television series
- "Blood Drive" (Beavis and Butt-head episode)
- Blood Drive (Dexter: Original Sin), an episode of the American TV series Dexter: Original Sin
- "Blood Drive" (The Office), the sixteenth episode of the fifth season of the television series The Office
- "Blood Drive", an episode from Scream Queens (season 2)
