= Rita Bennett =

Fictional character created by Jeff Lindsay

- Dexter character
- Julie Benz as Rita Bennett
- First appearance: Novels: Darkly Dreaming Dexter (2004); Television: "Dexter" (2006)
- Last appearance: Novels: Dexter's Final Cut (2013) Television: "My Bad" (2010)
- Portrayed by: Julie Benz

In-universe information
- Occupation: Hotel clerk Real estate agent
- Family: Gail Brandon (mother)
- Spouses: John Ackerman (ex-husband) † Paul Bennett (ex-husband); Dexter Morgan (husband)
- Children: Astor Bennett (daughter, with Paul); Cody Bennett (son, with Paul); Novels Only: Lily Anne Morgan (daughter); Television Only: Harrison Morgan (son)
- Relatives: † Debra Morgan (sister-in-law) † Brian Moser (brother-in-law); Cecilia (aunt)

Rita Ann Morgan (née Brandon; previously Ackerman and Bennett) is a fictional character created by Jeff Lindsay for his book series about a vigilante serial killer named Dexter Morgan. She also appeared in the television series Dexter, based on Lindsay's books. She was the girlfriend and later wife of Dexter in both media. Portrayed by Julie Benz, Rita was a series regular in the first four seasons. The character made her last television appearance in 2010; she was a special guest star in Dexter's season five opener titled "My Bad". The character appeared in seven of the eight Dexter novels.

In the novels, Dexter initially considers Rita little more than part of his disguise as a normal human being, and the perfect cover for his secret life as a serial killer. He later admits to growing quite fond of Rita, whom he married in the third book, Dexter in the Dark. In the television series, Rita is portrayed as a loving and caring mother who is emotionally damaged due to physical abuse by her former husband, Paul Bennett. Rita is the mother of Astor Bennett (Christina Robinson) and Cody Bennett (Preston Bailey), and later in the television series, gives birth to Dexter's son, Harrison. In the book series, she and Dexter have a daughter, Lily Anne.

Benz received positive reviews for her portrayal of Rita, winning a Satellite Award and Saturn Award, and receiving a Screen Actors Guild Award nomination. Her character was killed by Arthur Mitchell in the final episode of season four. Dexter executive producer and show runner Clyde Phillips claimed the staff did not know how Rita would leave until late in the fourth season, but that it began to feel inevitable as the story evolved. Benz was notified the day before the script was distributed to the cast and was disappointed, but found the scene revealing her departure to be "very poetic". The character's departure was considered controversial by some reviewers; E! writer Kristin Dos Santos said that it "might go down as one of the most shocking ever on television."

== Appearances ==
=== Literature ===
Rita Bennett was a character in the Dexter series of novels written by author Jeff Lindsay. Rita first appears in the original novel Darkly Dreaming Dexter. In the book series, Dexter Morgan primarily considers her a part of his "disguise", but he does care for her in his own emotionless way.

In Darkly Dreaming Dexter, the two are already together, but it is explained that Dexter started dating her solely to improve his "disguise" as a normal person. Because she was brutalized by her now-jailed ex-husband, Rita fears intimacy and does not expect much of Dexter; this suits the asexual Dexter perfectly. Dexter admits that he is more fond of her children, Astor and Cody, the closest he can get to feeling love. By a humorous misunderstanding, the couple become engaged in Dearly Devoted Dexter and married at the end of Dexter in the Dark. In the books, Rita is scatter-brained and easily upset, prone to speaking in disjointed, rambling sentences that Dexter often finds incomprehensible. The only quality that Dexter truly appreciates about her is that she is an excellent cook. She is a physical fitness buff; she and Dexter regularly go for 5-kilometre (3.1 mi) runs, long bike rides, and weightlifting sessions together. In the fifth book, Dexter is Delicious, she gives birth to Dexter's daughter Lily Anne. In Dearly Devoted Dexter, Dexter discovers that Cody and Astor are budding sociopaths and decides to provide them with the same "guidance" that his adoptive father Harry gave to him; namely, to teach them how to be careful, efficient killers of those who "deserve it". Rita is kept in the dark about the true nature of their relationship. She suspects that something is wrong with the children when she discovers them torturing a cat, but Dexter is able to reassure her that they didn't understand what they were doing. The television series is based on Darkly Dreaming Dexter. In Dexter's Final Cut, Dexter has an affair with TV star Jackie Forrest, and briefly considers leaving Rita. At the end of the novel, however, both Rita and Jackie are murdered by Robert Chase, a pedophile intent on kidnapping Astor.

=== Television ===
Rita Bennett appears in the premiere episode of Dexter, titled "Dexter" and is introduced as Dexter Morgan's girlfriend. It is revealed early on that Rita was physically and sexually abused by Paul Bennett (Mark Pellegrino), her ex-husband and the father of her children, Astor (Christina Robinson) and Cody (Preston Bailey). Dexter's sister Debra Morgan answered a domestic violence call and saved her life. Rita, who is ignorant of Dexter's secret life as a serial killer, appears regularly throughout the first season as his main source of support. She plays a much larger role in the episode "Return to Sender", in which Paul is released from prison and demands to be at Astor's birthday party. Rita asks that he not come to the party. In "Circle of Friends", Rita tells Paul he can see his children only through supervised visits for six months before she will consider letting him have unsupervised visitation rights. She hands him divorce papers that include that clause, and Paul signs them. In "Father Knows Best", however, Paul begins threatening Rita again when she prevents him from seeing the children. He forces his way into her house, where she defends herself by hitting him over the head with a baseball bat. In "Seeing Red", Paul presses charges against Rita for assault. When Paul visits Rita's house, he threatens Dexter when they are alone in the kitchen; Dexter reacts by hitting him with a frying pan. After Paul loses consciousness, Dexter drives him back to his hotel and plants drugs on him. Dexter alerts the police and Paul is sent back to prison.

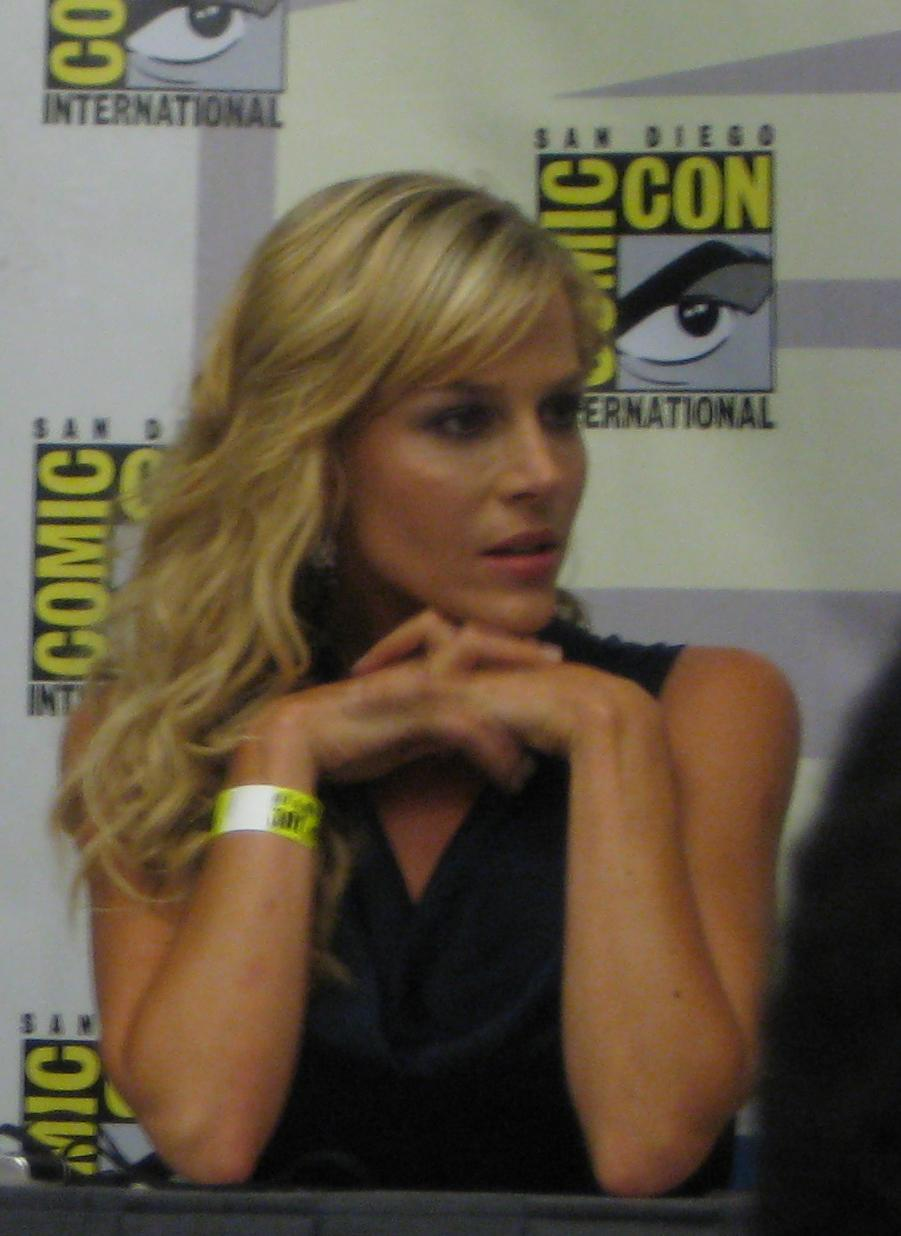
"I think we all feel so lucky to be part of a show that attracts such high caliber talent. We had Jimmy Smits come on last season, and he was amazing as Miguel Prado, and now John Lithgow is joining our cast. It blows all of us away. I think it elevates the work that's on the show, and it's inspiring to everyone." —Julie Benz

In the second season premiere Rita takes Astor and Cody to see Paul in prison. He insists that Dexter dragged him out of Rita's house before drugging him and tipping off the police — and that if she could find his missing shoe it would prove his innocence. Rita tells him that there is no shoe, despite having found it more than a month previously. She later admits that she found the shoe, but refuses to acknowledge that Dexter is involved. That night she receives a call from the prison and learns that Paul was killed in an inmate altercation. In "Waiting to Exhale", after Paul's funeral, Rita confronts Dexter about his involvement in Paul's death, and he is forced to admit to having a heroin addiction in order to cover up his real secret. Rita threatens to leave Dexter if he does not commit to a program to deal with his "addiction". He starts attending Narcotics Anonymous meetings, where a mysterious woman named Lila Tournay (Jaime Murray) volunteers to be his sponsor. In "See-Through" Rita's visiting mother, Gail (JoBeth Williams), suspects that Dexter is hiding something from the family. In "Dex, Lies, and Videotape", Rita breaks up with Dexter after a phone call from Lila reveals he lied to her.

In "That Night, a Forest Grew," Rita stands up to her mother and insists that she move out of the house. Rita tells Dexter that he is no longer welcome to visit her house or her children. He apologizes, admitting that his affair with Lila was a mistake, but she is still hesitant to forgive him. When Dexter breaks up with Lila, she retaliates by pursuing his co-worker and friend, Angel Batista (David Zayas). In "There's Something About Harry," Rita and Dexter reconcile and visit the beach together. In the second-season finale, Dexter is forced to lie about running away with Lila, in front of Debra. Lila, feeling hurt, leaves with what she recognizes as Dexter's bag of murder equipment. She goes to Rita's house and drugs the babysitter in order to abduct the children. When Dexter realizes that Astor and Cody are missing, he goes to Lila's apartment. She starts a fire and locks the three of them inside. Rita calls Debra for help and Debra decides to skip her flight to Oregon, with her boyfriend Frank Lundy (Keith Carradine). Dexter manages to pass Astor and Cody through a small window to the outside, and escapes after breaking down a thin wall.

In the season three opener "Our Father," Rita realizes that she is pregnant with Dexter's child. In "All In The Family", after an unsuccessful marriage proposal, Dexter tries to convince Rita that he is looking for more than a convenient merger of finances and parenthood. In "Turning Biminese," Rita is hospitalized after a medical emergency and Dexter cannot be found. Dexter is hesitant when Rita suggests that they buy a house and move in together. Rita becomes angry at Dexter's refusal to help organize their wedding. In the third-season finale, "Do You Take Dexter Morgan?", Rita and Dexter get married.

In the fourth season opener, Rita and Dexter are living happily together in a suburban neighborhood with Astor, Cody, and new baby Harrison. In "Remains to be Seen" Dexter is in a terrible car accident, and Rita demands that he give her his keys so that she can drive him. In "If I Had a Hammer," friction begins to develop in the couple's relationship, and Dexter seeks guidance from Arthur Mitchell (John Lithgow), a family man who appears to balance his responsibilities with his secret life as the "Trinity Killer". In "Hungry Man," Rita works hard to prepare Thanksgiving dinner. She shares a kiss with the next door neighbor, Elliot Larson (Rick Peters), when she asks if she can use his stove. Dexter arrives for an appointment with Rita for marriage counseling, but gets called to a crime scene as soon as he arrives. Soon after, Rita confesses that she and Elliot kissed, although Dexter tries to brush it off. Rita later admits that she felt hurt that he did not seem to care about her indiscretion. Dexter then punches Elliot and warns him to stay away from Rita, which reassures her that Dexter loves her. In the fourth season finale, Dexter asks her to go out of town so they can have a belated honeymoon; in reality, Dexter wants to keep her safe from Mitchell, who has learned his real identity and threatened to kill him and his family. After killing Mitchell, Dexter returns home and finds a message from Rita that she returned to pick up her identification for the flight. Dexter finds her dead in the bathtub — Mitchell's last victim. In the fifth season premiere "My Bad", Dexter realizes, much to his own surprise, that he genuinely loved Rita and is devastated by her death. Julie Benz reprised her role as Rita as a special guest star in a flashback to her and Dexter's first date, and as a corpse.

== Development ==
=== Casting and characterization ===
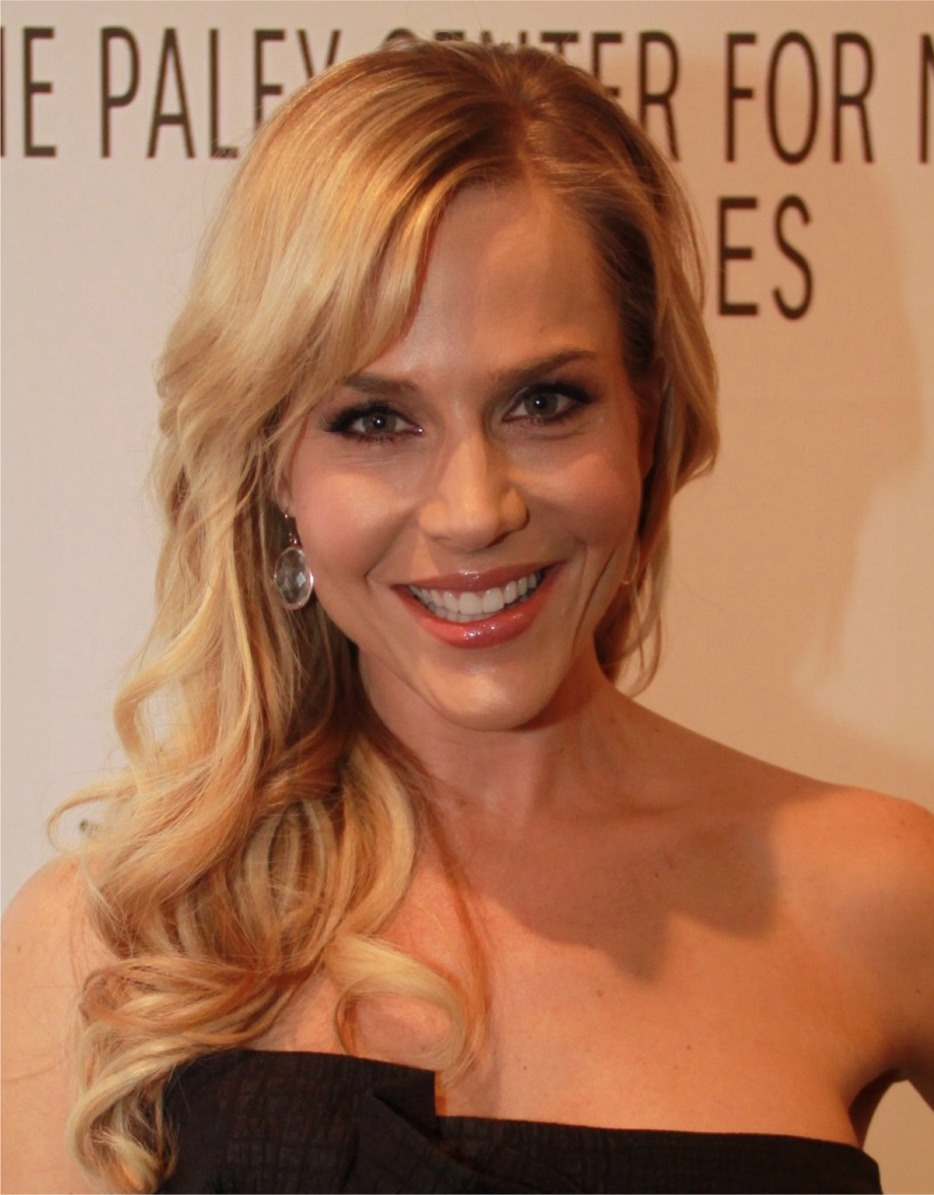
Julie Benz portrayed Rita Morgan for four seasons of Dexter.

The character of Rita Bennett was originally invented by Jeff Lindsay for his series of novels about Dexter Morgan, and she is featured in all but the final book in the series. Clyde Phillips and Melissa Rosenberg wanted to bring the character into the television series when casting for the TV version, Dexter. Julie Benz was given a copy of the script in 2005 and was asked to audition for the part. She was surprised because the script was "one of the best pilot scripts [she] ever read." She also read for the part of Debra and joked that she would have auditioned for Dexter's role. Benz had been a fan of Michael C. Hall from his role in Six Feet Under. She said in an interview with Vanity Fair, "I was such a fan, to the point where my cell-phone ring was the show's theme song. I had to change it once I got cast!". Benz performed for four seasons, until her character was killed in the series.

Rita is presented in the series as a loving and caring mother. As a result of being abused by her husband, Rita has no interest in sex, which suits the asexual Dexter perfectly. She developed a strong character. At the beginning of season two, the producers approached Benz about character growth. They wanted to make Rita stronger and less shattered than she was in the first season. Benz has said that she was "very sad to hear that. Because I loved playing her in season one where she was this very damaged, fragile bird who was just struggling so hard to make a better world for her kids, but just could not do it."

=== Death ===
Rita was killed by Arthur Mitchell in the season four finale "The Getaway".

Rita's death was alluded to by Dexter producers, who told media outlets "The Getaway" included a series-changing twist, leading to widespread speculation about it. Security precautions were taken to prevent the finale's secrets from becoming exposed. Network staff members were forced to sign non-disclosure agreements, and decoy scripts were drafted and disseminated to protect the twist ending. In one of the alternatives, Dexter learned about a child murderer escaping from prison, and tried to decide whether to join Rita on vacation or go after the escaped killer. Nobody but essential cast and staff were allowed on the set during filming of the episode, and the scripts and DVDs of the episode were watermarked before they were taken off the set.

Clyde Phillips claimed the Dexter staff did not know how the finale would conclude until late in the season, but he said Rita's death began to feel inevitable as the story evolved. Benz said she had been told that Lithgow knew about it from the beginning of the season. Phillips said the staff felt obligated to do more than kill the Trinity Killer in the final episode, especially because he felt the death of the third season antagonist (played by Jimmy Smits) was not handled "as well as we could have". The writers discussed the idea of having Debra find out about Dexter's secret life, but decided they could not anticipate how drastically the series would be changed by that. Benz heard rumors from David Zayas that her character would be killed in the episode, but she was not notified until much later. The producers met with her the day before the season finale script was distributed to the cast. She said, "It was a tough meeting. In a bizarre way, it felt like a scene from Defending Your Life." Benz described the death scene as "very poetic". Clyde Philips said, "She wasn't happy. She loved being with us. We loved having her with us. She took it... professionally. She was greatly disappointed. She's a professional. She works in television. She knew that this was a possibility."

The mystery writer J.A. Jance wrote in the Los Angeles Times, "Yes, it's a bit of a shock to discover that some of the TV series' characters who died last season or the season before are back among the living between the covers of Lindsay's new book. Rita, Dexter's long-suffering wife who died a terrible death in a bathtub in last year's season finale, is alive and well and having a baby in Dexter Is Delicious. But my advice to readers is this: Don't quibble. Get over it. After all, fiction is an alternate universe to begin with, and Lindsay's dark, comedic fiction is an alternate universe once removed."

== Reception ==
=== Critical reaction ===
The character of Rita has been well received by critics, who praised Benz's portrayal. Eric Goldman of IGN has said, "Dexter does a solid job of developing the roles of the supporting cast, with Rita, Deb, Doakes and LaGuerta all getting a good amount of development". He added, "There were a couple of forced moments in "Popping Cherry", most notably the drug dealer who came to Rita's house, in broad daylight, demanding money for her ex-husband's debts; it was all a bit over the top and cliché. On the other hand, it was interesting to note Dexter's inaction in that scene, making one wonder if perhaps he fears that any public display of physical defense, even for Rita, might result in him going too far and revealing what he is." Jarett Wieselman of the New York Post has said, "Rita always felt like the light in that dark show", and "In the beginning Rita was the vessel through which the audience could love Dexter." UGO.com placed Rita Bennett 7th on a list of "Top 11 Girlfriends on TV". Zap2it created a poll titled "Best Mom" as part of their "Greatest TV Characters" series of polls; Rita was voted 12th on a list of 14 characters.

The TV.com staff were less appreciative, listing her as 7th out of the "Ten Most Annoying Characters on TV". They noted that "While we mostly love the beatific Julie Benz, her complaining wifey character has been reduced to little more than whimpering and murmuring about Dexter's commitment to the family..." and summarised with "Might Rita die next week? For the first time since the series began, we really feel like we wouldn't miss her."

Rita was killed in the fourth season finale "The Getaway." This was a subject of controversy since the character continuing living in the books. E! writer Kristin Dos Santos called the ending "horrifying" and said, "This death just might go down as one of the most shocking deaths ever on television." Claire Zulkey said that the twist ending was intense, and the teleplay was woven with feature several moments that had led him to expect different conclusions. He praised what he expected to be a "re-set" of the series after Rita's death. Marcia White of The Express-Times declared Dexter "one of the best cable dramas on TV" and called the final scene between Dexter and Rita completely shocking. Mark Dawidziak of The Plain Dealer said the episode was shocking and suspenseful, calling Dexter "a series that leaves you guessing as the psychological ambiguities run deeper and darker".

=== Accolades ===
Julie Benz has been well received for her portrayal of Rita Bennett, winning and being nominated for a multitude of awards. These including one Satellite Award win for Best Supporting Actress and a Saturn Award win for Best Supporting Actress. She was also nominated for a Scream Award for Best Horror Actress and was jointly nominated, in 2009 and 2010, for a Screen Actors Guild Award for Outstanding Ensemble in a Drama Series.

Year	Group	Category	Result
2006	Satellite Awards	Best Supporting Actress in a Series, Miniseries or TV Film	Won
2008	Scream Award	Best Horror Actress	Nominated
2009	Screen Actors Guild Award	Outstanding Ensemble in a Drama Series	Nominated
2010	Saturn Award	Best Supporting Actress	Won
2010	Screen Actors Guild Award	Outstanding Ensemble in a Drama Series	Nominated
