= Dearly Devoted Dexter =

2005 novel by Jeff Lindsay

- Author: Jeff Lindsay
- Language: English
- Genre: Crime novel, Horror
- Publication date: 2005
- Publication place: United States
- Media type: Print (hardback & paperback)
- Preceded by: Darkly Dreaming Dexter
- Followed by: Dexter in the Dark

Dearly Devoted Dexter is a 2005 crime/horror novel by Jeff Lindsay, the second in his series about psychopathic vigilante Dexter Morgan, which has been adapted into a television series. It is narrated by the title character.

== Plot ==
Sgt. Albert Doakes, a Homicide detective, has grown suspicious of Dexter and obsessively tails him in his free time. This makes it impossible for Dexter to investigate (and perhaps kill) someone that he suspects of complicity in the sexual abuse and murder of young boys. When an unknown man is found bizarrely mutilated, Doakes recognizes the work of "Doctor Danco", a torturer who served with Doakes in the USASF during the Salvadoran Civil War. Danco has come to Miami to take revenge on his former comrades, drugging his victims with painkillers and psychotropics, and over episodes lasting several days or even weeks, surgically removing various body parts.

Dexter is drawn into the case when Danco abducts his sister Deborah's new boyfriend, Detective Kyle Chutsky. Amidst all the chaos, Dexter finds himself accidentally engaged to his girlfriend Rita Bennett. While trying to bond with Rita's children, Astor and Cody, he discovers that they're showing the same signs of sociopathy that he did at their age. Dexter looks forward to teaching them to control their "Dark Passengers" as his foster father, Harry, had taught Dexter to control his.

Dexter and Deb team up with Doakes to catch Danco, but Deb is injured in a car chase, forcing Doakes and Dexter to work together. Doakes is kidnapped by Danco, and Dexter uses a tracker to follow them to an alligator farm. Dexter manages to rescue Chutsky from the farm, but Danco escapes with Doakes. Dexter goes after Danco after returning Chutsky to Deb, but is sedated by Danco, who takes him captive.

Dexter learns that Danco's torture ritual includes a word game resembling hangman. Each victim is asked to guess a word chosen for them by Danco, a description of a grievous offense against him, for which the victim is to atone. Each wrong or unintelligible answer results in the amputation of a body part. The maximum number of pieces removed corresponds to the number of letters in the mystery word that has been carefully chosen for that particular victim. The torture is conducted patiently and methodically to allow the victim enough time to recuperate and begin healing before the next atrocity is perpetrated. This devious process is designed to maximize the psychological, as well as physical, devastation without ever actually killing the subject.

Deb and Chutsky arrive as Danco is working on Doakes, and Deb kills Danco in a shootout, saving Dexter. Doakes is hospitalized and is missing his hands, feet, and tongue, while Dexter takes the opportunity to return to killing.
