= Dexter Is Dead =

2015 novel by Jeff Lindsay

- Author: Jeff Lindsay
- Language: English
- Series: Dexter Morgan
- Genre: Crime novel
- Publisher: Doubleday
- Publication date: July 2015
- Publication place: United States
- Media type: Print (hardback)
- Pages: 304
- ISBN: 978-0-385-53653-0
- Preceded by: Dexter's Final Cut

Dexter Is Dead is the eighth novel written by Jeff Lindsay, and the final book in the Dexter book series, about Dexter Morgan, a vigilante serial killer who almost exclusively targets other serial killers. The book was released on July 7, 2015.

== Plot ==
After previous events, Dexter is falsely accused of murdering Rita and molesting Astor. To avoid embarrassment, the MDPD does all that it can to pin the crimes on Dexter, even resorting to falsifying evidence. Deborah decides to cut ties with Dexter, refusing to help him as a way to punish him for his past crimes and also demanding custody of his children. Only Masuka is working to clear Dexter's name, with no success. Brian bails Dexter out of jail and gets him a lawyer, but is being targeted by a Mexican drug cartel he had previously stolen money from. The cartel tries to kill Dexter multiple times to get to Brian.

Deborah reluctantly contacts Dexter to inform him that his kids have been kidnapped, which leads to a fragile reconciliation. Dexter sets up a meeting with Detective Anderson and some of Raul's thugs to get him killed, which happens, though not before he also kills his attackers, leaving Dexter with no one to interrogate. Eventually, they find out that their lawyer was supplying Raul with Dexter's intel, which makes them kill him and all of the cartel's members who followed Frank, save for one, who is taken by the brothers to a secluded warehouse, where he is brutally interrogated to get the kids' location and to satisfy their urges in the process.

Once Dexter's children are located, Brian, Deborah, and Dexter team up, break onto Raul's yacht, and take the kids back. Deborah takes the kids away, but Brian is killed by a bomb he himself planted, and Dexter is severely wounded by it. After Deborah returns to kill Raul in time, Dexter stays on the yacht to set another bomb so there's no evidence left. Dexter sets it up and leaves the ship to be rescued by Deborah in his boat. Gravely weakened from blood loss, Dexter manages to jump off the yacht before it explodes, losing consciousness while sinking into the sea.
