= María LaGuerta =

Fictional character in Dexter

- Dexter character
- Lauren Vélez as María LaGuerta
- First appearance: Novels: Darkly Dreaming Dexter (2004); Television: "Dexter" (2006)
- Last appearance: Novels: Darkly Dreaming Dexter (2004)
- Created by: Jeff Lindsay
- Portrayed by: Lauren Vélez; Christina Milian (Original Sin)

In-universe information
- Full name: María Esperanza di Alma LaGuerta
- Gender: Female
- Occupation: Police captain
- Spouses: Ángel Batista (ex-husband; deceased)
- Nationality: Cuban American

Captain María Esperanza di Alma LaGuerta (/ləˈɡwɛərtə/ or /ləˈɡwɜːrtə/; Spanish: María LaGüerta, Migdia LaGuerta in Darkly Dreaming Dexter) is a fictional character portrayed by Lauren Vélez in the Showtime television series Dexter, and as a younger version of LaGuerta by Christina Milian in Dexter: Original Sin. In the original series, she holds the position of lieutenant at the fictitious Miami-Metro Homicide Department. While initially depicted as a protagonist, Maria LaGuerta, who serves as the superior officer to main characters Dexter and Debra Morgan, evolves into one of the primary antagonists by Season 7.

== Character history ==
Discussions between LaGuerta and Angel Batista in the first and fourth seasons provide minor insight into LaGuerta's backstory. According to the dialogue, her family is located entirely in Cuba, and she mentions the experience of being alone in a foreign land, suggesting that she was sent to live in America independently.

=== Season one ===
In the series' beginning, LaGuerta is depicted as a determined and ambitious woman with a stronger aptitude for political maneuvering than practical police duties. She holds a deep animosity towards Debra, Dexter Morgan's sister, but harbors an attraction to Dexter. In the conclusion of the first season, Captain Tom Matthews, her superior, removes her from her leadership position due to her inability to apprehend the Ice Truck Killer.

=== Season two ===
In the early episodes of season two, LaGuerta grapples with her demotion and dissatisfaction with her replacement, Esmee Pascal. To retaliate, she engages in a romantic relationship with Pascal's fiancé, Bertrand, which fuels Pascal's growing paranoia and instability. As Pascal's behavior becomes increasingly erratic, Captain Matthews is compelled to remove her from her position and reinstate LaGuerta.

LaGuerta implores Doakes to go along with Lundy’s investigation and discovers he is considering retiring from being an officer. She offers to set him up with another employer, and plans to meet him with Doakes that night. Doakes does not show up to the meeting. After Doakes becomes the primary suspect in the Bay Harbor Butcher case, LaGuerta endeavors to vindicate him. She receives information from a dubious source regarding two Special Forces missions undertaken by Doakes, which coincide with the deaths of two Butcher victims. In the season finale, Doakes and drug dealer Jose Garza are discovered dead in an apparent accidental explosion, leading to the case's closure. Despite the evidence LaGuerta uncovers, it is disregarded. Following Doakes' demise, LaGuerta appeals to police officers for contributions to his memorial fund, refusing to accept the notion that her deceased friend was a serial killer.

=== Season three ===
LaGuerta announces Batista’s promotion to sergeant, and she is reunited with Miguel Prado (Jimmy Smits) after his brother Oscar is killed. After Debra unintentionally badmouths Oscar in front of Miguel, LaGuerta convinces Batista to drop her from the case, and attends Oscar’s wake. LaGuerta tries to reassure Miguel that the police will find Freebo, though he is doubtful. After Batista and Quinn are offered information exonerating Chickey Hines, who Miguel convicted, LaGuerta confronts Miguel with the new evidence. At Batista’s mention, LaGuerta confronts Miguel over not speaking with Chickey Hines. LaGuerta gets frustrated when evidence suggests Freebo is probably gone. When LaGuerta again confronts Miguel over not talking to her witness, Miguel suggests that having to accept Doakes was the Bay Harbor Butcher may be clouding her judgement. LaGuerta gives a witness statement granting Hines an alibi to his attorney, Ellen Wolf. Ramon meets with LaGuerta after he begins working on the case of a woman murdered by the Skinner, and suspects him of using the case to insert himself into the investigation of his brother's death. LaGuerta is enraged at Wolf after finding out she is investigating Miguel for misconduct. Batista keeps her out of the loop while Debra looks into the possibility of Ramon as the Skinner, and LaGuerta compliments Debra after Ramon is arrested for false imprisonment.

LaGuerta gives Ramon a deal where he has to give up his shield and retire to not be charged, which mends her relationship with Miguel. LaGuerta asks Wolf to accompany her to a police charity and the two develop a friendship. After Wolf stops answering her phone, LaGuerta becomes worried and is horrified when her body is found at a cemetery. LaGuerta reports Toby Edwards as the suspect in Wolf’s murder, and interrogates him. She believes he is the killer until Quinn tells her of evidence that exonerates him. Miguel visits LaGuerta at her home, and the two kiss before being discovered by Miguel’s wife Sylvia (Valerie Cruz). Through her own personal investigation and input from Dexter, LaGuerta uncovers that Miguel is responsible for Wolf's death. LaGuerta confides in Dexter, considering him the only other person aware of the truth. After Miguel's demise at Dexter's hands, LaGuerta becomes distressed by the possibility of the Cuban community honoring Miguel by naming a highway after him. She desires to obtain solid evidence to prove Miguel's guilt in Wolf's murder. However, Dexter manages to persuade her that pursuing the case would only inflict further pain upon Miguel's family and the community, and even if successful, the evidence would be insufficient. Reluctantly, LaGuerta lets go of the matter.

=== Season four ===
In the beginning of season four, it is revealed that LaGuerta is involved in a romantic relationship with Detective Angel Batista. They choose to keep their relationship hidden from their colleagues at the homicide department, except for Dexter, whom both Batista and LaGuerta confide in. However, their situation becomes complicated when LaGuerta discloses their relationship to their superiors to prevent it from being used against them in a trial. As a consequence, they face the possibility of being reassigned, requiring one of them to leave the homicide department. Recognizing the significance of their jobs for their identities, Batista and LaGuerta decide to end their relationship and provide signed affidavits to confirm this. Despite their intentions, staying apart proves challenging, and they resume their secret encounters. To avoid potential consequences from higher authorities, they clandestinely marry, with Dexter serving as a witness.

=== Season five ===
LaGuerta arrives on the scene after Rita's murder and hands the case to the FBI, despite objections from Batista. She attends Rita's funeral, and admits to Batista that she was too frightened to handle the case, the latter consoling her. Batista discovers that LaGuerta has over $200,000 in a savings account, and tries getting advice from Quinn and Debra on how to handle the situation, to undesired results. Batista and Masuka go for drinks and a drunk Batista assaults a drunk police officer after he makes sexual remarks about LaGuerta ("she gave the best blowjobs in Miami"). Batista is reluctant to tell LaGuerta what started the fight, and she demands specifics after Masuka brags about Batista’s conduct. Internal Affairs officer Jim McCourt (Raphael Sbarge) notifies her that Batista is being formally investigated after Lopez files charges and gets two witnesses to assert they saw Batista kick him while he was on the ground, charges that could get him incarcerated. LaGuerta orders Batista to visit Lopez and make amends with him. LaGuerta intercepts a conversation between McCourt and Batista, and tries getting McCourt to drop the case. Quinn gets arrested trying to get Trinity’s son to identify a sketch of Kyle Butler as Dexter, and LaGuerta puts Quinn on unpaid suspension and angrily scolds him for his theory. LaGuerta teams up with McCourt, and Batista begins to believe LaGuerta and McCourt are having an affair. He checks her cell phone for suspicious messages and later finds a rendezvous appointment in a hotel room. Outraged, he walks in on them, only to find out that it was intended to be a sting operation to apprehend a corrupt narcotics cop, in which LaGuerta agreed to participate to bail Batista out of the investigation. LaGuerta tries persuading Matthews to go along with the plan to stake out Club Mayan for the Fuentes brothers. She and Batista argue over her reasons for going to I.A.D. After Batista gets Yasmin Aragon (Jessica Camacho) to cooperate with the department in exchange for clearing her drug charges, Batista apologizes to LaGuerta, who admits she went to I.A.D to get his charges dropped.

LaGuerta and Batista speak with Jordan Chase after a car registered in his name is found with barrels containing dead women. At the stakeout, LaGuerta instructs Yasmin to sit with the Fuentes brothers so they can arrest them when they try leaving. Debra tries getting Manzon not to sit with the brothers, but LaGuerta overrules her. A shooting breaks out and Yasmin and Carlos Fuentes are killed. LaGuerta refuses to take responsibility for the incident. LaGuerta warns the others there will be consequences, and tells Debra that she’s putting Cira Manzon on administrative leave as the fall guy. After Debra objects, LaGuerta instead announces her as being behind the operation. Following Debra being assigned to the filing room and finding DNA evidence that some of the perpetrators in the Barrel Girls case were still on the loose, LaGuerta refuses to reopen the case until Debra berates her. LaGuerta reveals to her that she suspended Quinn to protect Dexter. LaGuerta reinstates Debra, but is still not embraced by Batista. LaGuerta questions Debra’s theory of a vigilante taking out the perpetrators in the Barrel Girls case. Debra, wanting to keep Jordan Chase as a material witness, tries to get a court order without LaGuerta’s help. After her order is rejected, LaGuerta gets one from another judge that owed her a favor. After Debra is unable to locate Jordan, LaGuerta advises they put him under a stake-and-notify. Stan Liddy (Peter Weller) is found murdered, and LaGuerta confronts Quinn over the fact that Liddy’s last five calls were to him before noticing blood on his shoe. Quinn is taken into custody, ahead of Dexter exonerating him with bloodwork, and LaGuerta later attends Harrison’s birthday party.

=== Season six ===
LaGuerta and Batista go through a divorce after realizing their divergent desires. Following her blackmailing of Matthews with a contact list belonging to a madam, which includes his name, LaGuerta is promoted to the position of captain. Matthews assigns Debra as the new lieutenant, a decision that upsets LaGuerta, as she had promised the role to Batista. She tries consoling him, but ends up angering Batista for both insulting Debra and for his being a casualty in her rivalry with Matthews. Initially uncertain, Debra seeks advice from LaGuerta, who intentionally provides her with unsound guidance in an attempt to undermine her. However, Debra gains confidence in her own abilities and becomes self-reliant. When evidence of Matthews' involvement with another prostitute emerges, LaGuerta initially instructs Debra to conceal it. However, LaGuerta warns Debra that she will face consequences if she deviates from the expected course of action.

=== Season seven ===
At the start of the season, LaGuerta discovers a blood slide containing the blood of serial killer Travis Marshall at the scene of his death. Recognizing similarities to the Bay Harbor butcher's methods, she begins an investigation to determine if the butcher is still alive and seeks to prove Doakes' innocence. Her suspicions turn toward Dexter when she learns about his boat's relocation during the Butcher investigation. LaGuerta seeks assistance from Matthews, who assures her that her suspicions are unfounded.

As LaGuerta and Matthews delve into the case, they revisit the cabin where Doakes died and uncover evidence linking Santos Jimenez to the deaths of Dexter and Brian Moser's mother. LaGuerta's suspicions of Dexter escalate after learning about his background and the disappearance of Jimenez. They search the area and discover evidence implicating Doakes, which LaGuerta believes was planted.

Eventually, LaGuerta devises a plan to confirm Dexter's identity as the butcher. She orchestrates the release of Hector Estrada, the man who ordered the killing of Dexter's mother, hoping that Dexter will target him. Dexter indeed tracks down Estrada but realizes LaGuerta's setup. Reluctantly, he releases Estrada to ensure his own escape, though LaGuerta deduces his intentions upon discovering the kill room.

LaGuerta has Dexter arrested for Estrada's murder, but forensic specialist Vince Masuka provides evidence that proves Dexter's innocence, leading to his release. Despite this setback, LaGuerta remains determined to apprehend Dexter, especially after finding circumstantial evidence linking him and Debra to the scene of Marshall's death. She confronts Debra with the evidence, but Debra defends herself.

As tensions escalate, Dexter concludes that the only solution is to kill LaGuerta. He abducts and kills Estrada, then renders LaGuerta unconscious upon her arrival. His plan is to stage the scene to make it appear as if LaGuerta and Estrada killed each other. However, Debra interrupts him and pleads for LaGuerta's life. LaGuerta implores Debra to kill Dexter, asserting her own moral superiority. Dexter relents and drops his weapon. Tearfully, Debra shoots a surprised LaGuerta in the chest, resulting in her death.

=== Dexter: Resurrection ===
When Batista visits Dexter in the hospital, he mentions LaGuerta telling him in confidence her belief that Dexter was the Bay Harbor Butcher, which he denies.

During Batista's conversation with Harrison, he tells him many innocent people died because of his father, including LaGuerta, Deb, and Rita.

When Dexter meets Detective Wallace, he lies that Batista spiraled after learning Doakes was the Bay Harbor Butcher and that his former friend pushed all his colleagues away after LaGuerta's death.

After Batista is fatally shot by Leon Prater, Dexter tells his dying friend that while he's the Bay Harbor Butcher, he didn't kill Doakes and LaGuerta. However, Batista tells Dexter that LaGuerta, Doakes and his own deaths are all Dexter's fault, nonetheless.

== Casting and characterization ==
CBR describes LaGuerta as "power-hungry and self-serving in a way many other characters aren't" and admits that while these traits did not make her endearing, it is nonetheless "rare to see a female character portrayed in such a way".

Vélez opined that LaGuerta "was so determined to do something with herself and make her way in this man's world that she had to play by her own rules" and after repeated failed romances with men, she concluded she could not "do both love and career at one time". Vélez commented favorably on the character's evolution over the first four seasons of the series: "She was really strong the first season, experienced loss in the second season, found hope in the third and in the fourth season, she finds love. So it's been an amazing journey and trajectory."

Vélez was saddened to leave the series but found the character's demise fitting: "Somewhere in her she always knew that she was going to have to face this particular evil, not necessarily Dexter, but that’s why she became a cop. There’s something really wonderfully fulfilling about it and bittersweet about leaving my Dexter family. But I’m glad that she left the way she did—not that she was shot, but willing to die for what she believed in."

After the announcement of the revival series Dexter: New Blood, Vélez expressed interest in reprising her role as a ghost: "I need to see all of his foes come back. It’s a very interesting thing to me that all the women in the show were killed. Rita, Maria, Debs...all the women died. I think they need to come back and ask him some questions."

In June 2024, Christina Milian joined the cast of the prequel series Dexter: Original Sin as a younger version of LaGuerta. Milian said that LaGuerta was someone who stayed the same way throughout her entire life: "She's always worked towards this. This was her goal. And I feel like she has goals. She's hyper-focused. It's not even the goal of what the career set is going to be, but the goal of actually solving this crime. And of course, step by step, making her name heard, her voice heard, and really being a voice of the people."

== Difference from novel ==
In the novels, LaGuerta's first name is "Migdia". In Darkly Dreaming Dexter, LaGuerta is depicted as a person who engages in political gamesmanship and exhibits manipulative behavior. The TV series presents a more sympathetic portrayal of her character. In both the novel and the TV series, LaGuerta flirts with Dexter to some extent, which annoys him. In the first book, Brian, Dexter's brother, fatally stabs LaGuerta, whereas in the TV series, LaGuerta remains alive and continues to play a significant role in Dexter's life until her demise at the conclusion of Season 7.

== Reception ==
WhatCulture ranked LaGuerta as the seventh best Dexter character. Gregory Eckert remarked that LaGuerta reminded him "of a crow—both intelligent and a scavenger". Ed Gonzales, praising the characters of Dexter, singled out LaGuerta, noting her "complicated ambition is a fascinating burden".

The relationship between LaGuerta and Batista was met with mixed responses, with some finding their romance forced. Emily St. James said the twist of Batista and LaGuerta being in a relationship "would be more of a shock were either of these characters developed beyond a stock series of character traits". Comic Book Resources noted their compatibility as a couple in an entry on the best duos in the Dexter series while TV Fanatic wrote their relationship was "not an office romance that’s funny, original or particularly interesting".

As the seventh season began, AV Club opined that LaGuerta had "genuine motivation to doggedly seek out another explanation that posthumously exonerates" Doakes. Jeffrey Bloomer of Slate believed LaGuerta's "entire crusade against Dexter felt like a catalyst to move the show along". Matt Fowler commended the series for making her death mean something in spite of his belief that "LaGuerta had become a pest over the past three seasons, and someone we all sort of morbidly wanted to see on Dexter's slab". Kevin Fitzpatrick wrote that her death did not "seem very climactic, nor did it justify some of the weaker points of the season."

Erik Kain of Forbes and Corey Chichizola of CinemaBlend praised Milian's version of LaGuerta in Original Sin as a spot-on recreation of the character. Brittany Frederick wrote that Milian's take on LaGuerta "embodies all of the things that made Velez's take on LaGuerta pop off the screen, but never feels like she's doing an impression of her". She also highlighted her addition as the best part of the show and for adding a foil to other characters. Alex Maidy saw Milian and most of the cast as feeling like caricatures of the original characters, and Alison Herman did not see Milian's LaGuerta as being "that far removed from the woman she’ll be in 15 years" in spite of her new backstory.
