= Harry Morgan (Dexter) =

- Dexter character
- James Remar as Harry Morgan
- First appearance: Novels: Darkly Dreaming Dexter (2004); Television: "Dexter" (2006)
- Last appearance: Novels: Dexter is Dead (2015)
- Created by: Jeff Lindsay
- Portrayed by: James Remar; Christian Slater (young; Original Sin)

In-universe information
- Full name: Harrison Morgan
- Gender: Male
- Occupation: Police officer
- Spouse: Doris Morgan (deceased)
- Children: Harry Morgan, Jr. (son; deceased); Debra Morgan (daughter; deceased); Dexter Morgan (son, adopted)
- Nationality: American
- Birth: July 9, 1936

Detective Harrison "Harry" Morgan is a fictional character in the Showtime television series Dexter and the novels by Jeff Lindsay upon which it is based. In the television series Dexter (2006–2013) and Dexter: Resurrection (2025) he is portrayed by James Remar, and appears as manifestation in the mind of his titular adoptive son, Dexter Morgan. In the prequel series Dexter: Original Sin (2024–25), Harry is portrayed by Christian Slater.

== Character biography ==
=== In the novels ===
Harry Morgan is a detective and highly respected member of the Miami Police Department, and a close friend of his immediate superior Lieutenant Tom Matthews. In the course of a high-stakes drug case, Harry begins an illicit relationship with Laura Moser, Dexter's biological mother, to gather information and evidence on the drug lord in question. The drug dealers eventually find out she is informing on them, and make an example of her; they brutally murder her and three others with chainsaws in a shipping container. Her sons Brian and Dexter Moser are left in the container for two days, sitting in blood, until Harry and a police team rescue them. Harry takes both Dexter and Brian home. Because Brian was old enough to actually have memories of the murders, he begins exhibiting dark tendencies, particularly when exposed to loud noises such as crying babies. Brian almost kills Debra when she is just a few months old, so Harry adopts Dexter while Brian is sent into a mental facility; Harry believes that the older Brian is permanently traumatized by the event and is "unsalvageable", but that Dexter is still young enough to be "saved". When Dexter is around 10 years old, Harry discovers that he has been killing neighborhood pets, and realizes that the boy has an innate need to kill.

At first, Harry attempts to manage Dexter's violent urges by only allowing him to kill animals, but he eventually comes to the conclusion that Dexter's pathology cannot be repressed, only controlled. Harry decides to train the boy as a vigilante, to hunt and kill murderers without leaving any clues. Dexter prizes these lessons as a means to satisfy his homicidal urges with his father's approval, dubbing the rules as the "Code of Harry". Harry's relationship with his biological daughter Debra, meanwhile, is more complicated; she craves her father's approval, but feels that he favors Dexter. (Harry keeps her in the dark about Dexter's "training".)

When Dexter is 20, Harry falls seriously ill and gives Dexter "permission" to kill Mary, one of his nurses, who is intentionally poisoning him with morphine. He dies a year later, supposedly of heart disease.

In Darkly Dreaming Dexter, Harry is deeply alarmed when Dexter nearly kills the school bully, and takes him to visit a serial killer incarcerated on death row, hoping the condemned man will serve as a living example of the importance of not being caught.

=== In the TV series ===
As in the novels, Harry has been dead for many years by the series' main timeline, but remains an important influence on his adopted son. For the first two seasons, he appeared only in flashbacks to Dexter's childhood. From season three onward, the dramatic device of flashbacks was replaced with Harry appearing as representations of how Dexter worked out his problems.

Late in the second season, it is revealed that he recovers from his illness. When Juan Ryness, a pimp who murders his own prostitute, is released due to a faulty search warrant, Harry loses his temper and tells Dexter he was right in training him. When Dexter kills Ryness, Harry is horrified by the way Dexter proudly shows him the pimp's dismembered body: It is Harry's first actual view of Dexter's "work", and he is ashamed of what he had trained Dexter to do. According to Matthews, Harry dies by suicide three days later after deliberately overdosing on his medication, but not before telling Matthews to look after his children.

Dexter learns Harry's secrets in the third season, and inadvertently reveals to Debra that Harry had cheated on his wife several times. This revelation has a profound effect on Debra, who loses all respect for the man she had always tried to live up to. Dexter, meanwhile, begins to question Harry's "code", realizing that he is the only one in charge of his "Dark Passenger". It is also revealed in season four that Harry had slept with many of his informants, not just Laura.

In the seventh season premiere, Debra witnesses Dexter murder Travis Marshall. Dexter claims that he went to collect evidence, and was surprised by Marshall; he then says that he "snapped" and killed him on impulse. Debra reluctantly helps him burn down the abandoned church where he killed Marshall, destroying the evidence of the crime. Later, Dexter comes home to Debra, who is surrounded by Dexter's victim's blood slides, a pack of knives, and other tools that Dexter uses to kill. Debra reluctantly asks Dexter if he is a serial killer. Dexter, taken aback, replies that he is. Horrified, Debra recoils from Dexter as he admits that he is the "Bay Harbor Butcher", and that Harry taught him how to get away with murder.

In season eight, Dexter learns that Harry had confided in Dr. Evelyn Vogel (Charlotte Rampling) about young Dexter's homicidal urges, and that she had helped him create Dexter's "code".

Harry finally parts ways with Dexter in the series' penultimate episode, "Monkey in a Box", when Dexter decides to leave serial killer Oliver Saxon (Darri Ingolfsson) for the police and join his son Harrison and girlfriend Hannah McKay (Yvonne Strahovski) at the airport to move to Argentina. Harry tells Dexter that he no longer needs him, and bids him goodbye. However, he returns in Dexter: Resurrection.

== See also ==
- List of imaginary characters in fiction
