= Miami Police Department =

Police department for the City of Miami, Florida

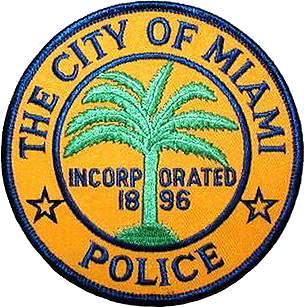

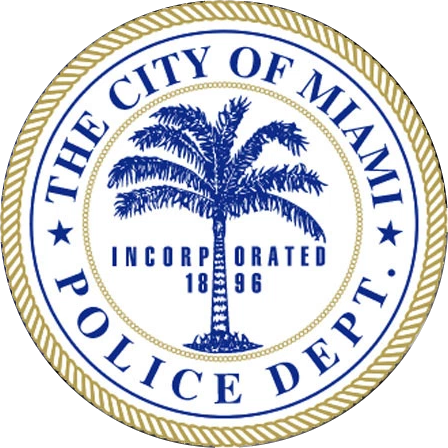
- Seal

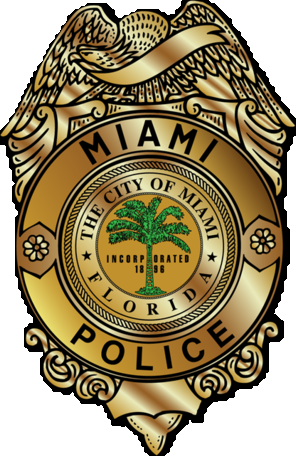
- Badge of an MPD officer
- Common name: Miami Police
- Abbreviation: MPD

Agency overview
- Formed: 1896; 130 years ago
- Employees: 1,810
- Annual budget: $266 million (2020)

Jurisdictional structure
- Operations jurisdiction: Miami, Florida, U.S.
- Map of Miami Police Department's jurisdiction
- Area: 55.27 square miles (143.1 km^{2})
- Population: 487,014 (2024)
- General nature: Local civilian police

Operational structure
- Headquarters: Miami, Florida, U.S.
- Police Officers: 1,410 (2024)
- Civilians: 400
- Agency executive: Edwin Lopez, Chief of Police
- Districts: 4

Facilities
- Stations: Miami Police Headquarters (Central Station), South District Station, North District Station, East District Station

Website
- Miami Police

The Miami Police Department (MPD), also known as the City of Miami Police Department, is a full-service municipal law enforcement agency serving the city of Miami, Florida, United States. MPD is the largest municipal police department in Florida. MPD officers are distinguishable from their Miami-Dade Sheriff's Office counterparts by their blue uniforms and blue-and-white patrol vehicles.

MPD operates the Miami Police College, which houses three schools: The Police Academy Class (PAC), The School for Professional Development (SPD), and the International Policing Institute (IPI), a program focused on training law enforcement personnel from countries outside of the United States.

== Controversies ==
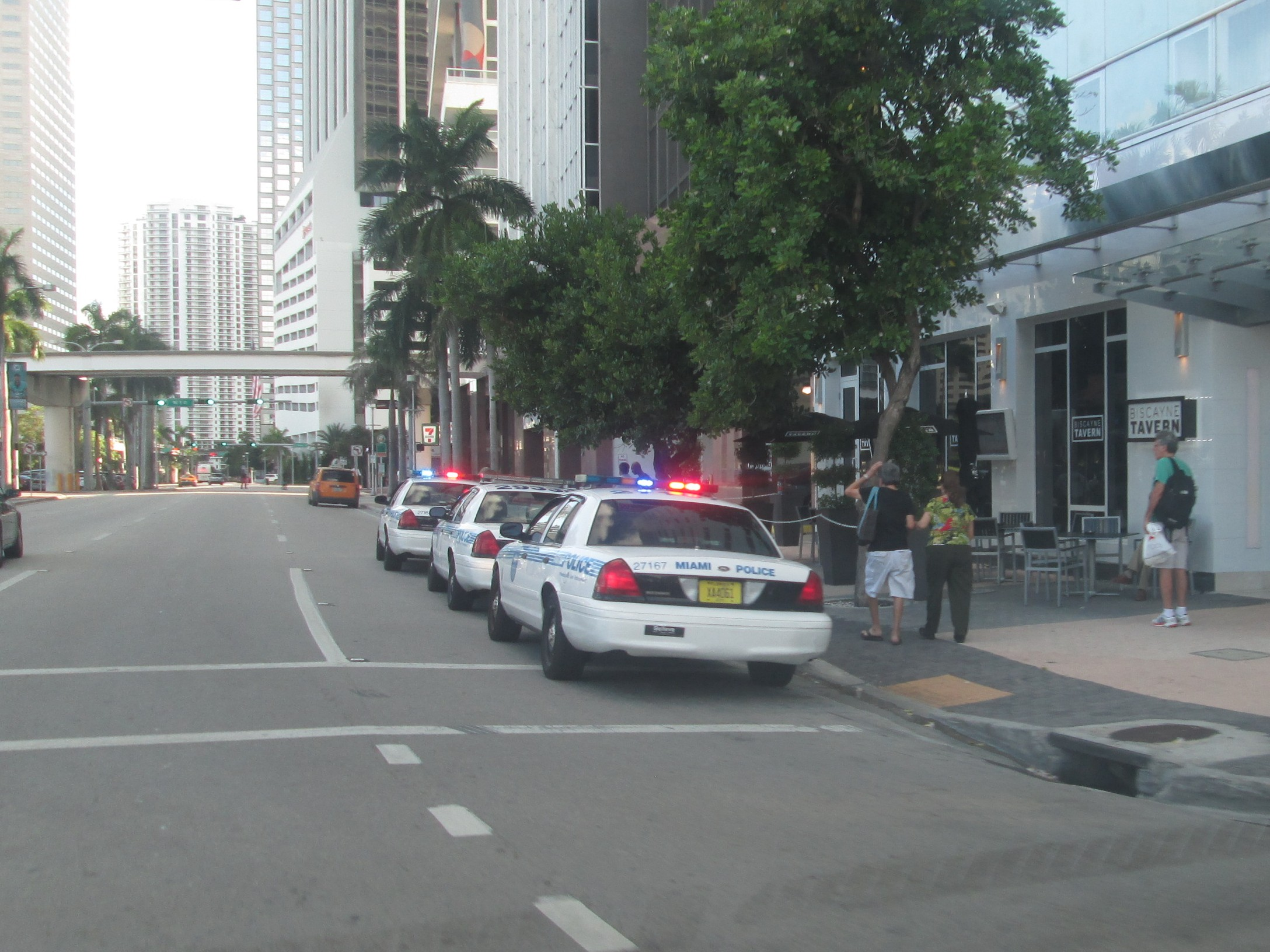
Miami Police Department patrol cars in 2017

In its early years, the MPD enacted an oppressive racial system in Miami. The MPD did not protect the black community from violence, as well as aided in the harassment and terrorization of the black population. The MPD intimidated black voters, pursued blacks on flimsy evidence, and strongly enforced certain laws solely when blacks were in violation of them. The MPD tacitly approved of or failed to investigate instances of white supremacist violence in Miami by terrorist groups such as the Ku Klux Klan.

In January 1986, The New York Times reported that "corruption charges are not new" to MPD.

In 2018, the Miami New Times wrote, "Miami cops have a storied history of getting caught committing the very crimes they are supposed to police."

Jorge Colina became MPD Chief of Police in 2018. In March 2021, Art Acevedo became Miami Police Department chief. Prior to this role, he served as the chief of police in Houston. Art Acevedo was fired on October 14, 2021

=== Civil rights investigations by U.S. Department of Justice ===
The U.S. Department of Justice (DOJ) investigated the Miami Police Department twice, once beginning in 2002 and once from 2011–2013.

The investigation by DOJ's Civil Rights Division and the U.S. Attorney's Office for the Southern District of Florida that was completed in 2013 was prompted by a series of incidents over eight months in 2011 in which Miami officers fatally shot seven young black men. The DOJ investigation concluded that the Miami Police Department "engaged in a pattern or practice of excessive use of force through officer-involved shootings in violation of the Fourth Amendment of the Constitution." The investigation reached many of the same conclusions as the 2002 investigation. It found that MPD officers had intentionally fired upon individuals on 33 occasions between 2008 and 2011, and that the MPD itself found that the shootings were unjustified on three occasions. The DOJ also determined that "a number of MPD practices, including deficient tactics, improper actions by specialized units, as well as egregious delays and substantive deficiencies in deadly force investigations, contributed to the pattern or practice of excessive force." The DOJ found that MPD had failed to "complete thorough, objective and timely investigations of officer-involved shootings" and sometimes failed to reach a conclusion "as to whether or not the officer's firearm discharge was lawful and within policy," which the DOJ cited as a factor that "undermined accountability and exposed MPD officers and the community to unreasonable risks that might have been addressed through prompt corrective action." The DOJ also found that "a small number of officers were involved in a disproportionate number of shootings, while the investigations into their shootings continued to be egregiously delayed."

To address the issues it identified, the city negotiated a judicially overseen agreement with the DOJ. Former Chief Miguel A. Exposito rejected the DOJ findings, which he called flawed.

A comprehensive settlement agreement between the DOJ and the City of Miami was reached in February 2016; under the agreement, the police department was obligated to take specific steps to reduce the number of officer-involved shootings (through enhanced training and supervision) and to "more effectively and quickly investigate officer-involved shootings that do occur" (through improvements to the internal investigation process and tighter rules for when an officer who shoots may return to work). Jane Castor, the former police chief of Tampa, Florida, was appointed as the independent monitor to oversee the city's compliance with the reforms.

=== Controversy over shooting an unarmed suspect ===
On December 10, 2013, at approximately 0530 hours, 22 police officers surrounded a suspect from an earlier shooting (police officer shot by suspect) and a second uninvolved person. Police ordered the men to put their hands up and then fired over 50 rounds into the car. Witnesses reported police continued to order the men to raise their hands and when they did fired more rounds into the car. In total 22 police officers fired more than 377 rounds hitting the car, other cars, adjacent buildings, their fellow police officers. The gunfire from the police was sufficient that some officers suffered ruptured eardrums. Witnesses reported that after killing the two men, some of the police were laughing.

=== Controversy over officer arrest ===
On October 11, 2011, Miami Police Department officer Fausto Lopez was speeding and driving erratically when he was caught by Florida Highway Patrol trooper Donna Jane Watts, after a 7-minute chase, with the video going viral on YouTube. Watts initially believed that the MPD cruiser had been stolen, so Lopez was arrested at gunpoint and handcuffed. This started a feud between the Florida Highway Patrol and the MPD (who regarded the arrest as an overreaction), involving police blog accusations and insults, posters attacking Watts, the state trooper who stopped Lopez, and someone smearing feces on another trooper's patrol car.

In February 2012, an investigation by the Sun-Sentinel examined SunPass toll records, and found that 800 police officers from a dozen South Florida agencies drove their cruisers above 90 mph in 2011, mostly while off duty. As a result of the Sun-Sentinel report, 158 state troopers and officers were disciplined, mostly receiving a reprimand and losing their take-home cars for up to six months. Lopez, who was found to have driven 90 mph on more than 80 occasions, was suspended with pay in early July 2012 and terminated from the MPD on September 13, 2012.

=== Controversy over shooting unarmed motorist ===
On February 11, 2011, Miami Police killed an unarmed motorist during a traffic stop and wounded another person in the car. Prosecutors declined to prosecute as they did not think they could say it was provable beyond a reasonable doubt that Miami Officer Reynaldo Goyos could have thought the driver was reaching for a weapon.

=== Retaliation against officers who expose wrongdoing ===
The Miami Community Police Benevolent Association (MCPBA), the city's Black police officers' union, has criticized the MPD for what it says is a culture of retaliation against police officers who blow the whistle on wrongdoing by fellow MPD officers.

=== Controversial detention of African American COVID-19 doctor ===
In April 2020, a Miami Police Sergeant generated controversy by handcuffing and detaining African American doctor Armen Henderson, who was assigned to treat homeless people for COVID-19, outside his home after receiving complaints that people were dumping trash in the area where he was working. Allegations soon surfaced that the matter in which Henderson was handcuffed and detained was in fact a case of racial profiling. The Miami Police Department eventually agreed to launch an internal investigation into the circumstances surrounding the handcuffing and detention of Henderson.

== Organizational structure ==
MPD follows a paramilitary organizational structure and is headed by the Chief of Police. The Deputy Chief of Police reports directly to the Chief and oversees the three major operational divisions of the agency, each of which is led by an Assistant Chief: Field Operations Division, Criminal Investigations Division, and Administration Division. The Internal Affairs Section, Professional Compliance Section, and Public Information Office report directly to the Chief of Police.

MPD is composed of more than 70 organizational elements, including a full-time SWAT team, Bomb Squad, Mounted Patrol, Marine Patrol, Aviation Unit, Gang Unit, Police Athletic League Detail, Crime Gun Intelligence Center, and a Real Time Crime Center. With 1371 full-time sworn positions and more than 400 civilian positions.

== Districts ==
Miami is divided into four policing districts, which are in turn divided into thirteen neighborhoods:

North District

- Liberty City
- Little Haiti
- Upper Eastside

Central District

- Allapattah
- Overtown
- Wynwood

South District

- Flagami
- Little Havana
- Coral Way
- Coconut Grove
- The Roads

East District

- Edgewater
- Downtown
- Brickell

== Ranks and insignia ==
Title	Insignia
Chief of Police	
First Assistant Chief	
Assistant Chief	
Major	
Executive Officer	
Captain	
Lieutenant	
Senior Uniform Patrol Sergeant	
Sergeant	
Senior Uniform Patrol Officers	
Detective	No insignia
Police Officer	No insignia
Police Officer Probationary	No insignia

Rank insignias for sergeants are worn on the upper sleeves below the shoulder patch while rank insignias for lieutenant through chief are worn on the shirt collar.

Hash Marks

For every three years of service, uniform personnel will be permitted

to place a single hash mark on the left forearm of their long sleeve uniform shirt.

Title	Insignia
Senior Uniform Patrol Sergeants	
Senior Uniform Patrol Officers	

== Demographics ==
Over the years, the demographics of full-time sworn personnel were:

Year	Percentage of full-time sworn personnel							
Year	Female	Male	African American or Black	American Indian	Asian/Pacific Islander	Hispanic, any race	White, non-Hispanic	Other race
1993	15.6	84.4	23.7	0.2	0.2	47.7	28.2	—N/a
1997	18	82	26	0	0	53	20	—N/a
2000	18	82	27	0	0	54	19	1

== Sidearm ==
Miami Police Officers are issued the Glock 22. Prior to the Glock 22 officers were armed with the Glock 17, which was in service from the late 1980s to the early 2000s. Detectives are issued either the Glock 23 or the more compact Glock 27. Prior to issuing the semi-automatic Glock pistols, MPD officers were issued the Smith & Wesson Model 64 and Smith & Wesson Model 67 while detectives had the Smith & Wesson Model 60 "Chief's Special" revolver also in .38 Special.

== See also ==
- List of United States state and local law enforcement agencies
