= Jeff Lindsay =

American playwright and crime novelist (born 1952)

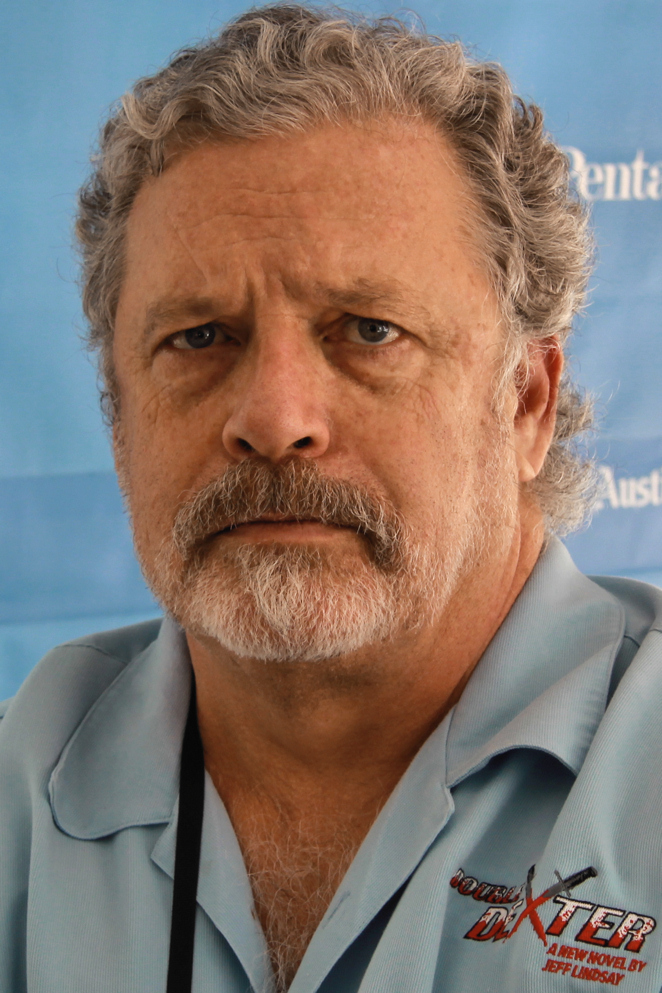
- Jeff Lindsay at the 2013 Texas Book Festival.
- Born: Jeffry P. Freundlich; July 14, 1952 (age 74); Miami, Florida, U.S.
- Education: Middlebury College
- Occupation: Writer
- Spouse: Hilary Hemingway
- Children: 3
- Writing career
- Pen name: Jeffry P. Lindsay
- Period: 1994–present
- Genre: Mystery
- Notable work: Dexter series

Jeffry P. Freundlich (born July 14, 1952), primarily known by his pen name Jeff Lindsay, is an American playwright and crime novelist. He is best known for his novels about the fictional psychopathic Miami police forensic analyst and serial killer-killing vigilante Dexter Morgan. The first book of the series was later developed into the Showtime television series from 2006 to 2013, with actor Michael C. Hall playing the character.

== Life and career ==
Lindsay was born in Miami, Florida and graduated from Ransom Everglades School in 1970, and from Middlebury College, Vermont, in 1975. Later he earned Master of Fine Arts degrees from Carnegie Mellon University in Theater Direction and Playwriting.

Many of his earlier published works include his wife Hilary Hemingway as a co-author. His wife is the niece of Ernest Hemingway and an author in her own right.

The first book in the Dexter series, Darkly Dreaming Dexter (which Lindsay wanted to name "Pinocchio Bleeds" after his middle daughter suggested it but his publisher disagreed) was included on the original nomination list for the Mystery Writers of America's Edgar Awards in the Best First Novel category. However, it was dropped from the list after the group learned that Lindsay had put out several books in the 1990s under another pen name, Jeffry P. Lindsay.

Dexter aired as a series on Showtime with the first season based on Darkly Dreaming Dexter and actor Michael C. Hall playing the character. The show eventually ran for eight seasons, though subsequent seasons had original storylines that departed from the plots of Lindsay's books. Lindsay had a cameo role in the tenth episode of the third season of Dexter. Lindsay has also written a comic book version of Dexter, distributed by Marvel comics, and which consists of two mini-series: Dexter and Dexter: Down Under.

Lindsay and Hemingway live in Cape Coral, Florida. They have three children.

== Bibliography ==
=== Novels ===
==== Billy Knight Thrillers series ====
1. Tropical Depression: A Novel of Suspense, or Tropical Depression (1994)
  Tropical Depression: A Novel of Suspense (1994), as Jeffry P. Lindsay
  Tropical Depression (2015)
2. Red Tide (2015)

==== Dexter series ====
1. Darkly Dreaming Dexter (2004)
2. Dearly Devoted Dexter (2005)
3. Dexter in the Dark (2007)
4. Dexter by Design (2009)
5. Dexter Is Delicious (2010)
6. Double Dexter (2011)
7. Dexter's Final Cut (2013)
8. Dexter Is Dead (2015)

==== Riley Wolfe series ====
1. Just Watch Me (2019)
2. Fool Me Twice (2020)
3. Three-Edged Sword (2022)
4. The Fourth Rule (2023)

==== Stand-alones ====
- Dream Land: A Novel of the UFO Cover-Up (1995), as Jeffry P. Lindsay, with Hilary Hemingway
- Time Blender (1997), as Jeffry P. Lindsay, with Michael Dorn and Hilary Hemingway, ISBN 978-0-06-105682-6
- Dreamchild (1998), as Jeffry P. Lindsay, with Hilary Hemingway, ISBN 978-0-312-85631-1

=== Comics ===
- Dexter: A Graphic Novel (2013–2014), 5 volumes
- Dexter Down Under (2014), 5 volumes

=== Non-fiction ===
- Hunting with Hemingway: Based on the Stories of Leicester Hemingway, or Hunting with Hemingway (2000), with Hilary Hemingway, ISBN 978-1-57322-159-7, biography

== Adaptations ==
- Dexter (2006–2013), television series developed by James Manos Jr., based on Dexter series
- Dexter: Serial Killer by Night (2006), short film, based on Dexter series
- Dexter: Blood Spatter (2006), animated series, based on Dexter series
- The Dark Defender (2007), animated series, based on Dexter series
- Dexter: Early Cuts (2009–2012), animated series directed by Marco Fernandez, based on Dexter series
- Dexter: New Blood (2021–2022), television series developed by Clyde Phillips, based on Dexter series
- Dexter: Original Sin (2024–2025), television series created by Clyde Phillips
- Dexter: Resurrection (2025-), television series developed by Clyde Phillips, based on Dexter series
