= Darkly Dreaming Dexter =

2004 novel by Jeff Lindsay

- Cover of the 2004 edition
- Author: Jeff Lindsay
- Language: English
- Genre: Crime novel, Thriller
- Publication date: July 2004
- Publication place: United States
- Media type: Print (hardback & paperback)
- Followed by: Dearly Devoted Dexter

Darkly Dreaming Dexter is a 2004 novel by Jeff Lindsay, the first in his crime/thriller series about American forensic analyst/serial killer Dexter Morgan. It formed the basis of the Showtime television series Dexter and won the 2005 Dilys Award and the 2007 Book to TV award.

== Plot ==
Dexter Morgan works for the MPD as a forensic blood spatter analyst. In his spare time, he is a vigilante serial killer who targets murderers, rapists, child molesters, and other undesirables he believes the legal system has failed to stop. Dexter's murders are directed by an inner voice he refers to as "The Dark Passenger", prodding Dexter to satisfy his homicidal urges on a regular basis. When accomplished, the voice is placated for a while, but always eventually returns.

Flashbacks reveal that Dexter's foster father, an esteemed police detective named Harry Morgan, recognized early on that he was a violent psychopath with an innate need to kill and taught him how to kill people who had gotten away with horrific crimes as a way to channel his homicidal urges in a "positive" direction. Harry also taught the boy to be a careful and meticulous killer, to leave no clues, and to be sure that his victims were guilty before killing them. Dexter calls these rules "The Code of Harry."

Dexter succeeds in managing his double life until he investigates the "Tamiami Slasher," who has murdered three sex workers. His adoptive sister, Deborah, who is also on the force and wants to be promoted to Homicide, and knowing that her brother has eerie "hunches," asks him for help in solving the case. Because of his moral code, Dexter helps Deborah. Yet he feels a compelling pull toward the killer because of shared desires. After a lucid dream, Dexter drives around Miami and spots a refrigerated truck. When he follows the truck, the killer throws a severed head in his car.

The killer begins sending Dexter messages, and Dexter finds the crimes fascinating. Dexter is torn between helping Deborah and allowing the killer to continue his spree. Meanwhile, due to his strange dreams, Dexter wants to kill somebody, so he follows a man whom he suspects of raping and killing five teenage girls and kills him after confirming his guilt. His dreams coincide with many details of the Tamiami Slasher’s actions. He eventually questions his own sanity, becoming concerned that he is subconsciously killing people in his sleep, but not remembering. This is exemplified by security footage from a crime scene showing a man who looks similar to him (though too poor quality to verify), which both Deborah and Dexter see. Deborah tells Dexter that she’ll turn him in the next day.

When Dexter wakes up, he realizes that the Tamiami slasher kidnapped Deborah. He goes to the scene, revealing that his sister is being held in the same shipping container that Dexter's biological mother, Laura, was held in. The killer is revealed to be Dexter's biological brother, Brian, who was separated from Dexter after their mother's murder at the hands of a drug dealer. Dexter has PTSD from the memory of his mother’s murder and struggles between choosing his moral code or joining with his brother. As Deborah's spiteful colleague, Migdia LaGuerta, arrives on the scene, Brian is disappointed that Dexter refuses to kill Deborah. Dexter allows Brian to kill LaGuerta and helps him escape out of a sense of familial loyalty. In the epilogue, Dexter stands at LaGuerta's funeral and feels sad, but cannot bring himself to cry.

== Award ==
Darkly Dreaming Dexter won the 2005 Dilys Award presented by the Independent Mystery Booksellers Association.

== Television series adaptation ==
The novel is the basis for a TV series on the cable network Showtime. Whereas the first season largely followed the book's plot, subsequent seasons featured original storylines not directly based on subsequent "Dexter" novels.

Darkly Dreaming Dexter was also featured on an episode of Booked, a Canadian television series that investigates crime fiction novels through the eyes of real forensic science experts.

== In popular culture ==
In "The Chris Rock Test", the second episode of the fifth season of the television series Billions, Chuck Rhoades is in a session with a therapist. When prompted by the therapist to choose a "wise person", Rhoades, an avid reader of crime fiction, nominates Dexter's father, Harry Morgan, for guidance.

Following the widespread success of the Dexter franchise, reformed former teenage revenge spree killer Pedro Rodrigues Filho (sometimes credited as the inspiration for the Dexter series) received international recognition as the "Brazilian Dexter (Morgan)" and "South American Punisher", leading to him ultimately beginning a career as a successful YouTuber from 2018 until his death in 2023.
