= Dexter season 4 =

Drama series

Dexter
- Season 4
- DVD cover
- Showrunner: Clyde Phillips
- Starring: Michael C. Hall; Julie Benz; Jennifer Carpenter; Desmond Harrington; C. S. Lee; Lauren Vélez; David Zayas; James Remar
- No. of episodes: 12

Release
- Original network: Showtime
- Original release: September 27 – December 13, 2009

Season chronology
- ← Previous; Season 3 Next → Season 5

The fourth season of Dexter premiered on September 27, 2009, and concluded on December 13, 2009. The series was renewed for a fourth and fifth season in October 2008, with each season consisting of 12 episodes. The show's writers convened during February and March 2009 to brainstorm ideas for the fourth season, and filming was scheduled to begin in June 2009. In May 2009, Showtime announced that John Lithgow would guest star in all 12 episodes as Miami's latest and deadliest serial killer, and Keith Carradine would return as Lundy. The fourth season focuses on Dexter attempting to find his way to balance his family life, the birth of his son, and his "extra-curricular" activities.

The season received critical acclaim, and is often considered by critics to be the best season of the show. The season opener was leaked to the Internet ahead of schedule in late August 2009. The fourth season premiered in the UK on the FX channel on August 20, 2010.

== Plot ==
Dexter has married Rita and settled down to domestic life with her two children and their new baby Harrison. Dexter continues to act on the urge to kill, but the strain of his double life affects both his job at Miami Metro Police and his home life. Rita becomes upset that Dexter appears to be lying to her, including keeping his old waterfront condo where he has stashed his blood drop trophies, and their marriage goes through troubling times.

As the police investigate a series of small-time crimes and killings in the so-called "Vacation Murders" with the help of investigative journalist Christine Hill, retired FBI Special Agent Frank Lundy returns to Miami; Debra initially worries he has come back to get closer to her, but he later reveals that he is following a case that the FBI refused to handle. The "Trinity Killer", believed to be an older Caucasian male, kills three people in the same city roughly once each year and in a specific sequence: one young woman killed in a bathtub, a mother killed by falling, and a father bludgeoned. The first two of this pattern have recently happened in Miami, and Lundy believes he knows when and where the last will be, but he is powerless to act on this. After rekindling their relationship, both Lundy and Debra are shot by an unknown assailant; Debra survives but Lundy's wounds are fatal, and the police initially assume that this was another random killing committed by the "Vacation Murderer".

Dexter learns of Lundy's analysis, steals his records, and uses his own skills to sneak into the building and catch sight of the Trinity Killer in the act of dispatching his third victim. Dexter follows the killer to his home, and is very surprised to learn that he is Arthur Mitchell: husband and father, deacon at a local church, and leader of the "Four Walls One Heart" homebuilding charity organization. Dexter continues to watch him and comes to admire his ability to balance his killings along with his family and work lives. Using the alias "Kyle Butler", Dexter joins Arthur's church, befriends him, and learns from him how to improve his own relationship with Rita and his family, giving over his condo to Debra while transferring his killing implements into a shed behind their house. Meanwhile, the Miami police learn that the Trinity Killer places a small amount of cremation ashes at each murder scene, and identify that Trinity and the ash share similar genetics but otherwise cannot match Trinity to any criminal records.

Arthur takes Dexter on a weekend trip to Tampa, taking him to the house in which he grew up. This is where he, at age ten, saw his older sister die after he inadvertently surprised her in the bathroom; she fell through the glass shower door and severed her femoral artery, killing her almost immediately. This drove his mother to suicide and his father to be abusive, eventually forcing Arthur to kill him. Arthur's trauma is analogous to the event that transformed Dexter and his brother into killers. Dexter later stops Arthur from trying to commit suicide. Dexter discovers that the Trinity series represents the deaths of Arthur's sister, mother and father, and that Arthur has likely been using the Four Walls One Heart program to cover his tracks. Dexter discovers that Arthur's home life is not as pleasant as it appeared, as Arthur abuses his son and locks his daughter in her bedroom, and when things get violent at Thanksgiving dinner, Dexter is forced to subdue Arthur to prevent him from hurting his family. Realizing how unhinged Arthur has become, Dexter decides to act on his plans to kill him.

Debra recovers from her wound but Lieutenant LaGuerta removes her from the case because of Debra's personal involvement. Still obsessed with solving Lundy's murder, Debra notices that the angle of her wound indicates that the shooter cannot be as tall as Trinity is believed to be. Trace evidence determines that Christine is genetically similar to Trinity and is Arthur Mitchell's illegitimate child. She has been following her father around in an effort to try to clean up after his killings, and so took it on herself to shoot Lundy and Debra when they got too close to Trinity's next target. After Arthur rejects her, Christine kills herself after confessing to the crime in front of Debra. With information collected from Christine, the police start to narrow down the list of possible suspects for Trinity, and Dexter realizes he needs to move fast to get him before the police do.

Dexter follows Arthur around but is surprised when he abducts a young boy from a family at an arcade. Dexter goes back to find that Lundy has missed this part of Arthur's pattern: each Trinity series was preceded, five days before, by the abduction of a ten-year-old boy – and since the bodies were never found, they were not recorded as killings. With the help of Arthur's son Jonah, Dexter tracks down a bomb shelter at a vacant home where Arthur had stowed the child, and is able to stop Arthur from drowning the boy in cement at a nearby Four Walls One Heart construction site, but Arthur gets away. Dexter, as "Kyle", blackmails Arthur with the threat of exposing him as a pedophile, as a way to meet Arthur in secret. Instead, Arthur tries to find and kill "Kyle", in the process killing an innocent with the same name. Arthur then tricks Dexter to reveal himself, and follows him back to the police station where they confront each other and he learns Dexter's true identity.

Thus revealed, Dexter tails Arthur to a bank parking lot. He drugs him and prepares to take him elsewhere but, having sideswiped another car during the pursuit, he is confronted and taken to jail. Dexter is shortly released, but finds that Arthur has disappeared. Dexter arranges a getaway for Rita and his children to the Florida Keys as a means to protect them from Arthur, promising to meet them later in the day. Dexter eventually finds Arthur, chokes him until he faints, and takes him to the same bomb shelter to kill him. After disposing of the evidence, Dexter returns home, and finds a voice mail from Rita. He proceeds to call her back, but is surprised to hear her phone ringing in the house. Hearing baby Harrison's cries, he races to the bathroom to find Arthur's last victim, Rita, dead in the bathtub, and Harrison bawling in the pool of blood on the floor.

== Cast ==
=== Main ===
- Michael C. Hall as Dexter Morgan
- Julie Benz as Rita Morgan
- Jennifer Carpenter as Debra Morgan
- Desmond Harrington as Joey Quinn
- C. S. Lee as Vince Masuka
- Lauren Vélez as María LaGuerta
- David Zayas as Angel Batista
- James Remar as Harry Morgan

=== Special guest star ===
- John Lithgow as Arthur Mitchell

=== Recurring ===
- Preston Bailey as Cody Bennett
- Courtney Ford as Christine Hill
- Christina Robinson as Astor Bennett
- Brando Eaton as Jonah Mitchell
- Rick Peters as Elliot
- Julia Campbell as Sally Mitchell
- Vanessa Marano as Becca Mitchell
- David Ramsey as Anton Briggs
- Keith Carradine as Frank Lundy
- Geoff Pierson as Tom Matthews
- Alicia Lagano as Nikki Wald
- Tasia Sherel as Francis

=== Guest ===
- Mary Mara as Valerie Hodges
- Jake Short as Scott Smith
- Gino Aquino as Benito Gomez
- Christina Cox as Zoey Kruger
- Greg Ellis as John Farrow
- Ian Patrick Williams as Stan Beaudry
- Adrienne Barbeau as Suzanna Coffey
- Suzanne Cryer as Tarla Grant

== Crew ==
Third season executive producers John Goldwyn, Sara Colleton, Clyde Phillips and Charles H. Eglee all returned to their roles. Third season co-executive producers Scott Buck, Melissa Rosenberg and Michael C. Hall were all promoted to executive producers for the fourth season. Third season producer Timothy Schlattmann was promoted to supervising producer for the fourth season. Wendy West also joined the crew as a supervising producer and writer. Third season co-producer Lauren Gussis was promoted to producer. Robert Lloyd Lewis remained the on set producer. Gary Law remained a co-producer. Associate producer Chad Tomasoski returned and was promoted to co-producer mid-season.

== Episodes ==
No. overall	No. in season	Title	Directed by	Written by	Original release date	U.S. viewers (millions)
37	1	"Living the Dream"	Marcos Siega	Clyde Phillips	September 27, 2009	1.52
Six months after the season 3 finale, Dexter is now living with three kids and a wife in a new home. Along with his new son Harrison, the complexities of being a suburban father of three is making it difficult for Dexter to concentrate on his work. Dexter's lack of sleep results in a murderer being released because Dexter brought the wrong case file to court, irritating Quinn. Quinn begins a relationship with reporter Christine Hill. A recently retired Agent Lundy has returned to finally capture a shadowy serial killer known as the "Trinity Killer", who has been at large for 30 years and always kills three people every year. After a call from Rita, Dexter quickly kills the released murderer but totals his car after falling asleep at the wheel.
38	2	"Remains to Be Seen"	Brian Kirk	Charles H. Eglee	October 4, 2009	1.37
Suffering from amnesia following his car crash, Dexter begins searching for Benny Gomez's lost body, with a helping hand from Harry. Dexter sees Quinn stealing money from a crime scene. Debra struggles with the return of her former lover while Quinn tries to juggle his personal and work life. Meanwhile, the Trinity Killer begins stalking his next chosen victim.
39	3	"Blinded by the Light"	Marcos Siega	Scott Buck	October 11, 2009	1.24
When a local vandal begins stirring up trouble, Dexter's neighborhood becomes vigilant and wary, two things Dexter doesn't need. His mobility is also hampered by Rita, who insists on driving him around after his accident. Debra is upset when Anton announces he's taken a local job to spend more time with her. Meanwhile, the Trinity Killer dispatches his next victim. Debra becomes drawn to Lundy's theories about Trinity, while Dexter finds himself in awe of Trinity's masterful killing technique. Despite their enthusiasm, LaGuerta threatens to shut down the investigation, instead focused on bringing the Vacation Murderers to justice.
40	4	"Dex Takes a Holiday"	John Dahl	Melissa Rosenberg & Wendy West	October 18, 2009	1.51
While Rita and the kids are out of town for a wedding, a police officer comes onto Dexter's radar. The officer is a kindred spirit, and highly suspicious of Dexter's motives. LaGuerta and Angel discuss full disclosure to the police department leadership about their relationship, pulling Dexter unwillingly into the middle of their problem. Meanwhile, Quinn's reporter girlfriend, Christine, uses their relationship to put out a story how Lundy's hunt for a phantom killer pulls time away from the Vacation Murders. This puts a strain on Lundy's retirement project when his visitor's pass to Miami Metro is revoked. Having to take the project out of the office, old sparks heat up between Lundy and Debra. At the end of the episode, Lundy and Debra are shot by an unseen assailant.
41	5	"Dirty Harry"	Keith Gordon	Tim Schlattmann	October 25, 2009	1.68
Recent events spur Dexter into his own investigation of the Trinity killer. His motivations are now personal, and the clock is ticking. But the closer Dexter gets, the more he realizes that Trinity is unlike any monster he's previously encountered. Meanwhile, Debra blames herself for events that were out of her control, and in doing so pushes away those closest to her. As LaGuerta and Batista close in on the Vacation Murderers, Batista uses Christine to catch them. However, to avoid their relationship jeopardizing trials, Chief Matthews orders LaGuerta to transfer Batista. Rita discovers Dexter still owns his apartment and begins to realize just how little she knows about the man she married, threatening their marriage. Dexter discovers Trinity's identity, but is unable to prevent him from claiming his next victim, and when he trails him home, he discovers that Trinity has a family.
42	6	"If I Had a Hammer"	Romeo Tirone	Lauren Gussis	November 1, 2009	1.88
Dexter knows it's only a matter of time before Miami Metro discovers the Trinity Killer's latest handiwork. Therefore, he has to work doubly hard to stay one step ahead of their investigation. Under the alias of 'Kyle Butler', Dexter has begun to realize that the closer he gets to Trinity, the more he stands to learn from this very different beast. As the friendly building contractor Arthur Mitchell, the Trinity Killer hides behind a well-kept mask; and getting behind that facade will require some extra prodding on Dexter's part. Meanwhile, Debra becomes frustrated when she finds herself shut out from her own case. She considers bending the rules in the name of justice, risking her career in the process. LaGuerta and Batista come to regret a major decision, and realize that by playing by the rules they may have painted themselves into a corner. And when the friction between Rita and Dexter comes to a head, Dexter gleans relationship advice from a most unlikely source.
43	7	"Slack Tide"	Tim Hunter	Scott Buck	November 8, 2009	1.76
A dismembered human arm is found inside an alligator, leading Dexter to his next victim, Jonathan Farrow, a photographer, who shoots fairly gruesome pictures of models, apparently killing Latina models who were in America illegally (ensuring no missing persons reports would be filed). Family and work taking its toll, a hurried Dexter accidentally makes his greatest single mistake and violates The Code of Harry. Meanwhile, Arthur Mitchell appears to be disturbed, and is unable to put a doe out of its misery after hitting it with his car. He then proceeds to build a coffin with lumber he obtained with Dexter's help. In order to get more 'alone time', Dexter, acting upon Arthur's advice, attempts to involve his kids in more activities, only to get pulled into the activities with them. After threatening Quinn to keep his girlfriend reporter away from Deb, Quinn starts digging into Dexter's past and makes his life a lot more difficult.
44	8	"Road Kill"	Ernest Dickerson	Melissa Rosenberg & Scott Reynolds	November 15, 2009	1.69
Dexter has always known his father's Code was meant to protect him from exposure. But after committing a serious mistake, he wonders if it could have been designed to protect him from something even more dangerous: human emotion. When he discovers that Arthur is planning an out-of-town trip, Dexter sees an opportunity to ride along and gain insight into the mind of a fellow monster. Even so, Dexter isn't prepared for the startling revelations Arthur makes along the way, revelations about his own past which only serve to convince Dexter of what he must do. Meanwhile, back at Miami Metro, Debra refuses to let a technicality keep her off the Trinity case. She works through others to ensure her voice is heard - that is, until she realizes that her single-minded pursuit of the Trinity Killer may have blinded her to the truth.
45	9	"Hungry Man"	John Dahl	Wendy West	November 22, 2009	1.76
For most people, Thanksgiving is a time for traditions and family. But for Dexter, it's an opportunity to get closer to his most dangerous adversary yet. As Dexter gains insight into Arthur's psychology by studying those closest to him, he finds himself drawn into a bizarre and twisted world. Meanwhile, Rita has her hands full preparing dinner for a packed house, including a few unexpected guests. Batista gets closure on an old case, while Debra uses the holiday to continue her investigation of the Trinity Killer, a pursuit which threatens her brother's safety and brings to light surprising revelations about someone else close to her.
46	10	"Lost Boys"	Keith Gordon	Charles H. Eglee & Tim Schlattmann	November 29, 2009	1.80
Dexter finally believes he understands the beast Arthur Mitchell, known as the Trinity Killer. But when a ten-year-old boy goes missing, Dexter is forced to question everything he's learned up to this point. It's a race against the clock to find the boy before Trinity kills him, and with each step forward, Dexter has to confront the real possibility that he may have more in common with Trinity than he'd like to admit. Secrets abound - from Cody, who is forced to defend one of Dexter's lies, Masuka, who can't bring himself to confess what he witnessed at Thanksgiving, and Debra, whose recent discoveries force one of Miami's finest into making an impossible decision.
47	11	"Hello, Dexter Morgan"	SJ Clarkson	Scott Buck & Lauren Gussis	December 6, 2009	2.11
Dexter's worst fears have been realized. Because of Debra's unrelenting pursuit, Miami Metro is just one step away from discovering the identity of the Trinity Killer. And Dexter can't let that happen. Arthur's arrest would not only deprive Dexter of a satisfying kill, it would also expose the secret life Dexter's been leading (as Kyle Butler) in his pursuit of this monster. Dexter must take drastic action to buy himself time to deal with Trinity in his own fashion. Meanwhile, Rita decides to confide in Dexter, which doesn't go as well as she'd hoped. LaGuerta and Batista's breach of ethics paints them into a very tight corner. And Arthur, who still can't understand why Dexter didn't simply turn him in, begins his own bloody investigation into 'Kyle Butler'.
48	12	"The Getaway"	Steve Shill	Story by : Scott Reynolds & Melissa Rosenberg; Teleplay by : Wendy West & Melissa Rosenberg	December 13, 2009	2.58
As the noose tightens, Arthur warns Dexter to back off. But Dexter will do anything to stop Arthur from eluding him, even if that means putting himself on the wrong side of the law. Rita acknowledges the rocky relationship she and Dexter share, but reaffirms her support. Meanwhile, Batista and LaGuerta face the consequences of their actions and now that they are married agree to move in together. Debra finally learns that Dexter is the Ice-Truck Killer's brother and tells Dexter. She then tells him he is the only constant truly good thing in her life and that she loves him. At the culmination of the episode, Dexter finally captures and kills Arthur, but then goes home to find Rita dead... apparently killed by Arthur hours earlier in the same manner as the other Trinity bathtub victims. Dexter finds his own son, Harrison, alive but sitting in a pool of his mother, Rita's exsanguinated blood --a thematic link back to how young Dexter himself (and brother), sat in the deep puddle of their own murdered mother's blood.

== Critical attention ==
Before airing, Michael Ausiello of Entertainment Weekly, in an interview with Sara Colleton, said that the fourth season was "bloody promising".

The New Yorker's Emily Nussbaum called Lithgow's characterization of Arthur as "so creepy I’m still not over it" in 2011 and also said the character was "modeled on the BTK Killer".

In the 2016 book titled TV (The Book), co-written by critics Alan Sepinwall and Matt Zoller Seitz, Sepinwall included the fourth season of Dexter in the section "A Certain Regard", which consisted of shows they loved but were not able to reach their list of the 100 greatest American television series. Sepinwall praised the season as the entire series' best, stating that "[s]tructurally, the Trinity season was a rehash of the first, but Lithgow was mesmerizing as a kindly old man who was cruel underneath. And the climax... was such a perfect ending not only to that season, but to Dexter as a whole, that continuing the series felt redundant."
