= Living the Dream (Dexter) =

- Dexter episode
- Episode no.: Season 4 Episode 1
- Directed by: Marcos Siega
- Written by: Clyde Phillips
- Cinematography by: Romeo Tirone
- Editing by: Stewart Schill
- Original release date: September 27, 2009
- Running time: 54 minutes

Guest appearances
- John Lithgow as Arthur Mitchell (special guest star); David Ramsey as Anton Briggs; Adrienne Barbeau as Suzanna Coffey; Courtney Ford as Christine Hill; Lisa Darr as Benito Gomez's Lawyer; Jerry O'Donnell as Detective; Keith Carradine as Frank Lundy

Episode chronology
← Previous "Do You Take Dexter Morgan?"	Next → "Remains to Be Seen"
- Dexter season 4

"Living the Dream" is the first episode of the fourth season of the American crime drama television series Dexter. It is the 37th overall episode of the series and was written by executive producer Clyde Phillips, and was directed by Marcos Siega. It originally aired on Showtime on September 27, 2009.

Set in Miami, the series centers on Dexter Morgan, a forensic technician specializing in bloodstain pattern analysis for the fictional Miami Metro Police Department, who leads a secret parallel life as a vigilante serial killer, hunting down murderers who have not been adequately punished by the justice system due to corruption or legal technicalities. In the episode, Dexter struggles in maintaining his life as vigilante while also raising his son with Rita. Meanwhile, a new killer is investigated in the city.

According to Nielsen Media Research, the episode was seen by an estimated 1.52 million household viewers and gained a 0.8/2 ratings share among adults aged 18–49, becoming the most watched episode of the series at the time. The episode received highly positive reviews from critics, who considered it a promising start for the season.

== Plot ==
Dexter (Michael C. Hall) drives during the night, but it is actually revealed to be an attempt to sleep. In the backseat, he has his baby son, Harrison, who has been keeping him awake for the past weeks. Elsewhere, a man (John Lithgow) sneaks into a woman's house, stripping himself naked in her bathroom. The woman, Lisa Bell, enters and is held hostage by the man. He forces her into the bathtub with him, where he strangles her and slits her femoral artery while holding a mirror against her face.

Dexter's lack of sleep impacts his job, as he accidentally winds up with incorrect blood analysis during a court hearing against a murderer, Benito Gomez. Gomez's lawyer gets him released by dismissing Dexter's work, angering Quinn (Desmond Harrington). While investigating Bell's murder, Quinn is approached by Christine Hill (Courtney Ford), a reporter interested in the case, and he gives her his phone number. Debra (Jennifer Carpenter) continues her relationship with Anton (David Ramsey), while investigating the identity of Harry's informant. Secretly, Angel (David Zayas) and LaGuerta (Lauren Vélez) have started an affair.

Bell's murder prompts the return of Frank Lundy (Keith Carradine), who has noted a pattern in the femoral artery wound. Miami Metro also discovers old blood hidden beneath the floor, indicating there was another murder. The database reveals that another woman was killed in a similar modus operandi in 1979. Lundy tells Dexter that he is retired from the FBI, but he returned upon learning that the murder was conducted by a serial killer, known as the Trinity Killer, who he has been pursuing for years. The killer kills three people per year across the country, but the FBI has not officially started a manhunt. Debra is agitated when she discovers Lundy has returned, but Lundy hopes they can see each other more often.

Dexter sets out in killing Gomez himself, targeting him at a bar. It is revealed that Dexter is still keeping his apartment, where he continues hiding his blood slides. Instead of going after Gomez at a bar, he knocks him unconscious outside his home. Before killing him, he is called by Rita (Julie Benz) to get medicine for Harrison. Dexter is forced to quickly kill Gomez and chop the body. While driving, Dexter falls asleep, causing the car to flip.

== Production ==
=== Development ===
The episode was written by executive producer Clyde Phillips, and was directed by Marcos Siega. This was Phillips' fourth writing credit, and Siega's eighth directing credit.

== Reception ==
=== Viewers ===
In its original American broadcast, "Living the Dream" was seen by an estimated 1.52 million household viewers with a 0.8/2 in the 18–49 demographics. This means that 0.8 percent of all households with televisions watched the episode, while 2 percent of all of those watching television at the time of the broadcast watched it. This was a slight increase in viewership from the previous episode, which was watched by an estimated 1.51 million household viewers with a 0.7 in the 18–49 demographics.

=== Critical reviews ===
"Living the Dream" received highly positive reviews from critics. Matt Fowler of IGN gave the episode an "amazing" 9.2 out of 10, and wrote, "By the time Season 3 ended we had begun to feel like there was nothing that Dexter couldn't overcome. He was smarter than his colleagues and tougher than his adversaries. His challenges became that of an emotional nature. His strides were physiological. This is why it's great to watch Dexter sort of melt through the cracks as he crumbles a bit under his own weariness. This is a man so adept at blending in and turning invisible that it's amazing to watch him unable to remain mentally meticulous. After "Living the Dream" is over, we really get the sense that Dexter is about to get assailed from all sides... and we can't wait to watch him overcome."

Emily St. James of The A.V. Club gave the episode a "C+" grade and wrote, "At some point, Dexter is going to have to ultimately reckon with everything he's done, even if the show doesn't deign to have him pay for those misdeeds (which is fine). The longer Dexter runs, though, and the less danger Dexter is in of being caught, the more danger there is that the show will finally just side entirely with Dexter being a quirky sociopath who sometimes commits murders and less with his dark passenger. Without some sort of ultimate reckoning, Dexter will never have to look into the mirror and, more crucially, neither will we." Adam Sternbergh of Vulture wrote, "It's only episode one, and Dexter already looks ready to crash — literally, it turns out, as the show ends with his car going end-over-end. Has this baby spelled the end of Dexter?"

Alan Sepinwall wrote, "Hall is good enough, and the show well-made enough, that I'm going to keep watching, but I don't feel particularly invested in it." Gina DiNunno of TV Guide wrote, "This season, Dexter is living the dream as new dad, with a wife and a house in the 'burbs. But fatherhood isn't what Dexter expected it would be, as the lack of sleep really puts a damper on his vigilante-murder schedule."

Danny Gallagher of TV Squad wrote, "It still plays heavy on the complex emotions and relationships that make Dexter's life so interesting, but it also features shimmers of laughter as Dexter tries to juggle the life of a father, wife, blood spatter expert, and avenging serial killer without relying too much on one device or character." Television Without Pity gave the episode an "B" grade.

Clyde Phillips submitted this episode for consideration for Outstanding Writing for a Drama Series at the 62nd Primetime Emmy Awards.
