= Blinded by the Light (Dexter) =

- Dexter episode
- Episode no.: Season 4 Episode 3
- Directed by: Marcos Siega
- Written by: Scott Buck
- Cinematography by: Romeo Tirone
- Editing by: Matthew V. Colonna
- Original release date: October 11, 2009
- Running time: 51 minutes

Guest appearances
- John Lithgow as Arthur Mitchell (special guest star); David Ramsey as Anton Briggs; Courtney Ford as Christine Hill; Suzanne Cryer as Tarla Grant; J. C. MacKenzie as Andy Brightman; Keith Carradine as Frank Lundy

Episode chronology
← Previous "Remains to Be Seen"	Next → "Dex Takes a Holiday"
- Dexter season 4

"Blinded by the Light" is the third episode of the fourth season of the American crime drama television series Dexter. It is the 39th overall episode of the series and was written by executive producer Scott Buck, and was directed by Marcos Siega. It originally aired on Showtime on October 11, 2009.

Set in Miami, the series centers on Dexter Morgan, a forensic technician specializing in bloodstain pattern analysis for the fictional Miami Metro Police Department, who leads a secret parallel life as a vigilante serial killer, hunting down murderers who have not been adequately punished by the justice system due to corruption or legal technicalities. In the episode, Dexter and Miami Metro investigate a new victim committed by the Trinity Killer, while also dealing with a vandal in his neighborhood.

According to Nielsen Media Research, the episode was seen by an estimated 1.24 million household viewers and gained a 0.5/1 ratings share among adults aged 18–49. The episode received positive reviews from critics, although some criticized the lack of character development and momentum.

== Plot ==
During a barbecue, Rita (Julie Benz) confronts Dexter (Michael C. Hall) over his car crash. For his sake, she decides to drive him to work. When a local vandal begins stirring up trouble, the neighborhood establishes a watch, further complicating Dexter's escapades.

The Trinity Killer (John Lithgow) forces Tarla (Suzanne Cryer) to enter a warehouse building, then yells at her to jump out of the building. When he threatens to kill her family, she jumps, leading to her death. He subsequently drops some powder next to her body. As Miami Metro investigates the death, Lundy (Keith Carradine), finds a pattern to a similar death that occurred thirty years ago. Following Trinity's pattern, he will then kill a man as his final victim. Debra (Jennifer Carpenter) is skeptical of ruling the death as a suicide, given that she drove so far and left two children behind. Quinn (Desmond Harrington) decides to give two tickets for a Miami Dolphins game to Dexter, and he in turn gives it to Masuka (C. S. Lee).

Masuka finds that Tarla was diagnosed with a brain tumor, ruling her death as a suicide, but Debra is still not convinced. Quinn confronts Dexter over his attempts to deflect him, and Dexter states he does not care if he is "a dirty cop." Quinn is offended by the remark, explaining he took the money to cover his debts, to which Dexter simply tells him not to get Debra involved. Anton (David Ramsey) returns from his job at the cruise; as his band has a local job at a bar, he can now stay with Debra more often. Debra is not happy with the news, especially as she questions her feelings for Lundy. Dexter also talks with Astor (Christina Robinson), apologizing for constantly humiliating her. Astor reconciles with him, understanding his position.

Dexter suspects that Jesse (Matthew Fahey), a teenager whom Astor likes, might be the vandal in the neighborhood. However, as he sneaks in, he discovers that Jesse's father Andy (J. C. MacKenzie) is the real vandal. Andy admits hating the neighborhood and his own life, and is willing to let Dexter kill him. When Dexter threatens to kill Jesse, Andy promises to stop. Dexter returns home, annoyed over a lights system that his neighbor Elliot installed. He destroys them with a rake, which is witnessed by Rita.

== Production ==
=== Development ===
The episode was written by executive producer Scott Buck, and was directed by Marcos Siega. This was Buck's seventh writing credit, and Siega's ninth directing credit.

== Reception ==
=== Viewers ===
In its original American broadcast, "Blinded by the Light" was seen by an estimated 1.24 million household viewers with a 0.5/1 in the 18–49 demographics. This means that 0.5 percent of all households with televisions watched the episode, while 1 percent of all of those watching television at the time of the broadcast watched it. This was a 10% decrease in viewership from the previous episode, which was watched by an estimated 1.37 million household viewers with a 0.6/1 in the 18–49 demographics.

=== Critical reviews ===
"Blinded by the Light" received positive reviews from critics. Matt Fowler of IGN gave the episode a "great" 8.2 out of 10, and wrote, ""Blinded By The Light" wasn't without its thrills, but it definitely was one of Dexter's slighter episodes. With all the signs and signals blinding us (much like Dexter's neighbor's motion-sensor floodlights), we're once again reminded of the fact that Dexter's taking a huge risk by trying to live the life of a family man in quaint suburbia. Harry pops back in to remind Dexter that Dexter's the one to blame if he winds up sticking out too much. If, in fact, he brings unwanted attention on himself. If he's unable to fit in."

Emily St. James of The A.V. Club gave the episode a "B–" grade and wrote, "Dexter's main storyline is a weird combination of goofy comedy and overwrought satire, which is nullifying one of the show's best aspects. And yet, every episode of the show contains just enough momentum that I find myself wanting to watch the next episode straight off. Which is something, I guess."

Kristal Hawkins of Vulture wrote, "Dexter is going to have to explain to his wife just why he smashed out all the security lights in front of the house. He's probably not going to use the old "I'm a serial killer" excuse, but she's eventually going to start suspecting something." Billy Grifter of Den of Geek wrote, "The confidence of the creative people behind Dexter is almost palpable now, and "Blinded By The Light" is a fine example of how well they know their characters. Being so in touch with their subtleties allows them to exploit your expectations, and make them surprise you in the way that real people occasionally do."

Alan Sepinwall wrote, "Still not feeling all that inspired by the non-Lundy/Trinity portions of the season, but at least there was more of those two in this one, as we start to get a sense of how Trinity operates, and as Lundy gets into the heads of both Deb and Dexter." Gina DiNunno of TV Guide wrote, "This week on Dexter, a neighborhood vandal prompts the residents of Dexter's community to form a neighborhood watch."

Danny Gallagher of TV Squad wrote, "It's hard to think of a more painful or downright scary way to go, and making that poor woman jump to her death had the hairs on the back of my neck suicidal and wishing to jump for their freedom. The way his scenes leave little breadcrumbs for the audience to nibble up until his true secrets are revealed are well-paced and leave you wanting whatever breadcrumbs are used to make." Television Without Pity gave the episode a "C+" grade.
