= If I Had a Hammer (Dexter) =

- Dexter episode
- Episode no.: Season 4 Episode 6
- Directed by: Romeo Tirone
- Written by: Lauren Gussis
- Cinematography by: Marty Layton
- Editing by: Matthew V. Colonna
- Original release date: November 1, 2009
- Running time: 55 minutes

Guest appearances
- John Lithgow as Arthur Mitchell (special guest star); Geoff Pierson as Thomas Matthews; Courtney Ford as Christine Hill; Julia Campbell as Sally Mitchell; Roma Maffia as Marriage Therapist; Brando Eaton as Jonah Mitchell; Vanessa Marano as Rebecca Mitchell

Episode chronology
← Previous "Dirty Harry"	Next → "Slack Tide"
- Dexter season 4

"If I Had a Hammer" is the sixth episode of the fourth season of the American crime drama television series Dexter. It is the 42nd overall episode of the series and was written by producer Lauren Gussis, and was directed by Romeo Tirone. It originally aired on Showtime on November 1, 2009.

Set in Miami, the series centers on Dexter Morgan, a forensic technician specializing in bloodstain pattern analysis for the fictional Miami Metro Police Department, who leads a secret parallel life as a vigilante serial killer, hunting down murderers who have not been adequately punished by the justice system due to corruption or legal technicalities. In the episode, Dexter gets close to the Trinity Killer in an attempt to uncover his past, while Debra desperately wants to get involved in Lundy's case.

According to Nielsen Media Research, the episode was seen by an estimated 1.88 million household viewers and gained a 0.9/2 ratings share among adults aged 18–49, making it the most watched episode of the series by then. The episode received very positive reviews from critics, who praised Dexter's scenes with Arthur.

== Plot ==
Dexter (Michael C. Hall) follows the Trinity Killer (John Lithgow), whose real name is Arthur Mitchell. Arthur follows a routine, working as a high school teacher and church deacon, earning him respect among the neighborhood. Miami Metro has also discovered the body at the office building, and Dexter knows they will soon connect it to Trinity.

Debra (Jennifer Carpenter) wants to get involved in Nikki Wald's case, but is frustrated when she is asked to not get involved. Nikki is considered the prime suspect in Lundy's death, which she denies. Debra refuses to let Lundy's case go unsolved, so she decides to testify as a witness. She confronts Nikki at her cell, but Nikki once again reiterates she is innocent and has an alibi, causing Debra to attack her. Despite that, Debra finally realizes she did not kill Lundy. Masuka (C. S. Lee) discovers DNA in the ashes found in the cases, but Dexter knows Arthur covered his tracks in the database. Dexter is forced to attend marriage counseling with Rita (Julie Benz), as she feels unhappy with his lies and absence. The therapist gets Rita to see similarities between Dexter and Paul, and Rita admits feeling pressured to ask much from Dexter. Nevertheless, she wants Dexter to be more active, or she might leave him.

To get close to Arthur, Dexter introduces himself as "Kyle Butler" and asks for Arthur's help, claiming his wife kicked him out. Arthur guides him by volunteering at his Four Walls One Heart organization, wherein they build houses. He meets Arthur's family; wife Sally (Julia Campbell), son Jonah (Brando Eaton), and daughter Rebecca (Vanessa Marano). To get Angel (David Zayas) to stay in Homicide, LaGuerta (Lauren Vélez) tells Matthews (Geoff Pierson) she will leave the unit instead. While Matthews accepts it, Angel is not content with getting her to leave Homicide. To prevent each other from leaving, they tell Matthews that they have ended their relationship. Matthews accepts to let them stay, but warns they could lose their careers if they lie.

Masuka's DNA finds a connection to a woman related to Arthur, and Dexter investigates Arthur's past. He finds that his sister, mother and father died in the same way he murdered his victims. He cuts himself so Arthur can tend him and let him enter his house. He discovers that Arthur's organization worked through the country, and the dates corroborate with the murders. He finds an urn containing Arthur's sister Vera's ashes, and Arthur turns aggressive when he touches it. Arthur apologizes, explaining that his sister is part of him, and that his family "saved" him from a dark path. Dexter uses this conversation to talk with Rita on their next session, explaining needing some space for himself. Rita says she understands, and later surprises him by giving him a shed at their backyard to keep his belongings, to his delight.

== Production ==
=== Development ===
The episode was written by producer Lauren Gussis, and was directed by Romeo Tirone. This was Gussis' fifth writing credit, and Tirone's first directing credit.

== Reception ==
=== Viewers ===
In its original American broadcast, "If I Had a Hammer" was seen by an estimated 1.88 million household viewers with a 0.9/2 in the 18–49 demographics. This means that 0.9 percent of all households with televisions watched the episode, while 2 percent of all of those watching television at the time of the broadcast watched it. This was a 11% increase in viewership from the previous episode, which was watched by an estimated 1.68 million household viewers with a 0.8/2 in the 18–49 demographics.

=== Critical reviews ===
"If I Had a Hammer" received very positive reviews from critics. Matt Fowler of IGN gave the episode a "great" 8.2 out of 10, and wrote, "The suspense is building nicely in this series - Deb getting closer still to her father's indiscretions and figuring out that Trinity murdered Lundy. Dexter's still set on killing Trinity for Deb, even though it's something that he has no intention of sharing with her. Even if he doesn't come clean with her about his Dark Passenger, he still wouldn't even be able to reveal to her that a dead Arthur Mitchell is the Trinity Killer."

Emily St. James of The A.V. Club gave the episode a "B" grade and wrote, "I don't think “If I Had a Hammer” is a great episode of the show, but it mostly eschews some of the things that are troublesome for the show in favor of some interesting character beats. Yeah, no one dies, and the storyline is practically non-existent in favor of Dexter and Arthur having some bonding time, but that's bonding time that needs to happen if the rest of the storyline is to play out." Kristal Hawkins of Vulture wrote, "We don't believe they're done, but we're more interested in finding out why Trinity has only his sister's ashes — and watching the imminent showdown between him and Dexter. And yes, we also look forward to seeing more of Harry Morgan."

Billy Grifter of Den of Geek wrote, "What I've liked so far is how natural the writing and acting now is. All those involved in Dexter seem to understand the show entirely and it all moves effortlessly from drama to terror and comedy without missing a beat." Gina DiNunno of TV Guide wrote, "Clearly the kid has issues, too, because what teen puts their parents on a pedestal like that? In a way, you can't help but wonder if Dexter is comparing this well-adjusted kid to what Harrison will grow up to be."

Danny Gallagher of TV Squad wrote, "Now that Dexter is on the hunt, he seems more reserved, held back and less willing to pounce on his weakened prey. I'm sure part of him feels the need to put this man out of our misery and avenge the attack on his sister, but now he sees him as a mentor, a role model, a zen-like Yoda who can teach him how to strengthen his mask while he's doing the bidding of his "Dark Passenger." But will this moment of philosophy for madmen drag things down to a screeching halt?" Television Without Pity gave the episode a "B+" grade.
