= Dirty Harry (Dexter) =

- Dexter episode
- Episode no.: Season 4 Episode 5
- Directed by: Keith Gordon
- Written by: Tim Schlattmann
- Cinematography by: Marty Layton
- Editing by: Louis Cioffi
- Original release date: October 25, 2009
- Running time: 49 minutes

Guest appearances
- John Lithgow as Arthur Mitchell (special guest star); Geoff Pierson as Thomas Matthews; David Ramsey as Anton Briggs; Courtney Ford as Christine Hill; Julia Campbell as Sally Mitchell; Christina Robinson as Astor Bennett; Preston Bailey as Cody Bennett; Brando Eaton as Jonah Mitchell; Vanessa Marano as Rebecca Mitchell

Episode chronology
| ← Previous "Dex Takes a Holiday" | Next → "If I Had a Hammer" |
- Dexter season 4

"Dirty Harry" is the fifth episode of the fourth season of the American crime drama television series Dexter. It is the 41st overall episode of the series and was written by supervising producer Tim Schlattmann, and was directed by Keith Gordon. It originally aired on Showtime on October 25, 2009.

Set in Miami, the series centers on Dexter Morgan, a forensic technician specializing in bloodstain pattern analysis for the fictional Miami Metro Police Department, who leads a secret parallel life as a vigilante serial killer, hunting down murderers who have not been adequately punished by the justice system due to corruption or legal technicalities. In the episode, Dexter uses Lundy's tapes to track Trinity Killer's next moves, while Debra grieves Lundy's death.

According to Nielsen Media Research, the episode was seen by an estimated 1.68 million household viewers and gained a 0.8/2 ratings share among adults aged 18–49, making it the most watched episode of the series by then. The episode received very positive reviews from critics, who praised the Trinity's story arc, but criticism for the rest of the subplots.

== Plot ==
Miami Metro arrives at the crime scene in the hotel's parking lot, where Lundy has died and Debra (Jennifer Carpenter) was wounded. Despite being told that Debra's injury is not fatal, Dexter (Michael C. Hall) wants to get involved in the case, but Angel (David Zayas) asks him to leave for his own sake.

Johnny Rose, the prime suspect of the Vacation Murders, is named as the suspect in Lundy's death, but Dexter is not sure. He breaks into his hotel room and steals his research on the Trinity Killer (John Lithgow). Dexter visits Debra in the hospital, helping her walk to the bathroom. Anton (David Ramsey) suddenly enters, relieved to see she survived. Debra, saddened, tells Anton that she had sex with Lundy and breaks up with him, causing him to angrily walk out of the hospital. Rita (Julie Benz) also confronts Dexter, as she just got a call from his landlord, discovering that he still has his apartment.

Hoping to lure Johnny's partner, Nikki Wald, out, Angel leaks a story to Christine (Courtney Ford) where he states Johnny has STD. Upon seeing it in the newspaper, Nikki kills Johnny at a hotel. Miami Metro quickly arrives and arrests her. While content, Matthews (Geoff Pierson) disapproves of Angel's relationship with LaGuerta (Lauren Vélez), as he feels it will cause conflict on trials. Matthews tells her that Angel will receive his promotion, but he will have to be transferred out of the Homicide unit.

Using Lundy's tapes, Dexter traces Trinity's pattern, concluding he will strike at an office building. As he does not know his appearance, he breaks into the evidence room to find Lundy's remaining tape, which contains the physical description of Trinity. Before pursuing him, he meets with Debra on the parking lot where Lundy was killed. She laments having lost it all, and scolds Dexter for not appreciating his life with Rita. As she cries, Dexter consoles her. He goes to his apartment to retrieve his tools, only to find Rita and Harrison, as she searched her apartment to find whatever he was hiding. Dexter then reveals his secret in his bedroom's trunk: a rifle that belonged to Harry (James Remar), claiming he did not want a gun in her house. Rita does not believe it, and has him sleep in his apartment, after which they will think over the future of their marriage.

At the office building, Dexter believes Trinity targeted a security guard, only to discover that it was a different person. He witnesses him kill a man with a hammer, unable to prevent it, also discovering that he removed a footage disk to prevent his crime from being seen. As Trinity calmly leaves in his van, Dexter follows him to a house. As he prepares to surprise and sedate him, he is shocked to discover Trinity being welcomed by his wife and children.

== Production ==
=== Development ===
The episode was written by supervising producer Tim Schlattmann, and was directed by Keith Gordon. This was Schlattmann's seventh writing credit, and Gordon's seventh directing credit.

== Reception ==
=== Viewers ===
In its original American broadcast, "Dirty Harry" was seen by an estimated 1.68 million household viewers with a 0.8/2 in the 18–49 demographics. This means that 0.8 percent of all households with televisions watched the episode, while 2 percent of all of those watching television at the time of the broadcast watched it. This was a 11% increase in viewership from the previous episode, which was watched by an estimated 1.51 million household viewers with a 0.7/2 in the 18–49 demographics.

=== Critical reviews ===
"Dirty Harry" received very positive reviews from critics. Matt Fowler of IGN gave the episode a "great" 8.6 out of 10, and wrote, "Despite the gripping endgame, "Dirty Harry" played out as the aftermath/fallout of the last episode. With Lundy dead and gone, Deb has shattered into tiny emotional pieces and it's up to Dexter to comfort her. The trouble is that, quite simply, he doesn't know how. Dexter's remedy to her problems, and to most problems, is killing."

Emily St. James of The A.V. Club gave the episode a "B" grade and wrote, "For all of the interesting discussion it can provoke about whether the show is playing it too safe or is playing some sort of diabolical long con on the audience, there will be entire episodes devoted to Dexter catching up with the audience and boring interpersonal stuff that no one cares about. I get that Michael C. Hall can't be in every scene and that if they just had Dexter immediately catching up to Trinity, there'd be no series here, but nothing hampers this show more than the need to kill time for much of the first half of its season."

Kristal Hawkins of Vulture wrote, "Dexter finds himself identifying with a killer again — this time because they're both family men hiding their murderous impulses under a veneer of normalcy. But he also realizes how much he has in common with a family member: All the Morgans have a dark side." Billy Grifter of Den of Geek wrote, "This episode significantly cranked the tension up, probably higher than it's been for some time, and given the succulent trailer for the next story, things don't exactly calm down soon."

Alan Sepinwall wrote, "that ending promises to create a nice moral dilemma for Dexter, who wants vengeance for his sister (and, to a lesser extent, for Lundy, whom he liked as much as he's capable of liking anyone), but who's also going to want to learn how Trinity has compartmentalized his life for all these years. In between though, the only part that was engaging at all was Deb's meltdown in the parking lot, with too much time spent on nagging Rita, or the boring supporting characters." Gina DiNunno of TV Guide wrote, "Confused, Dexter begins to approach Trinity with his syringe, but the woman who opens the door greats him with a kiss, and children greet him as "dad." Turns out Trinity isn't the loner that Lundy said he was. "He's like me," Dexter says."

Danny Gallagher of TV Squad wrote, "it's finally starting to pay off with this week's episode. Some of those dull plotlines have brought together what appear to be some much needed closure and we finally learn another piece of the Trinity Killer's picture and it's starting to look like a Normal Rockwell as opposed to a blood-spattered Jackson Pollock." Television Without Pity gave the episode a "B" grade.

Tim Schlattmann submitted this episode for consideration for Outstanding Writing for a Drama Series at the 62nd Primetime Emmy Awards.
