= Remains to Be Seen (Dexter) =

- Dexter episode
- Episode no.: Season 4 Episode 2
- Directed by: Brian Kirk
- Written by: Charles H. Eglee
- Cinematography by: Romeo Tirone
- Editing by: Louis Cioffi
- Original release date: October 4, 2009
- Running time: 49 minutes

Guest appearances
- John Lithgow as Arthur Mitchell (special guest star); David Ramsey as Anton Briggs; Courtney Ford as Christine Hill; Richard Gilliland as Eddie Noonan; Suzanne Cryer as Tarla Grant; Christina Robinson as Astor Bennett; Preston Bailey as Cody Bennett; Keith Carradine as Frank Lundy

Episode chronology
| ← Previous "Living the Dream" | Next → "Blinded by the Light" |
- Dexter season 4

"Remains to Be Seen" is the second episode of the fourth season of the American crime drama television series Dexter. It is the 38th overall episode of the series and was written by executive producer Charles H. Eglee, and was directed by Brian Kirk. It originally aired on Showtime on October 4, 2009.

Set in Miami, the series centers on Dexter Morgan, a forensic technician specializing in bloodstain pattern analysis for the fictional Miami Metro Police Department, who leads a secret parallel life as a vigilante serial killer, hunting down murderers who have not been adequately punished by the justice system due to corruption or legal technicalities. In the episode, Dexter struggles to remember the location of Benito Gomez's body, while the Trinity Killer stalks his next victim.

According to Nielsen Media Research, the episode was seen by an estimated 1.37 million household viewers and gained a 0.6/1 ratings share among adults aged 18–49. The episode received positive reviews from critics, who praised the performances, although some were critical of the slow progress in the storylines.

== Plot ==
After the crash, Dexter (Michael C. Hall) is taken by an ambulance, but his car is taken by authorities. At the hospital, Dexter experiences amnesia; while he remembers killing Gomez, he does not remember most of what happened afterwards. While the doctor wants him to stay, Dexter leaves with Rita (Julie Benz).

A man is murdered, and Christine (Courtney Ford) uses this to earn it the name "Vacation Murders", frustrating LaGuerta (Lauren Vélez). While inspecting the man's house, Quinn (Desmond Harrington) opens his safe and takes some of the money, but sees that Dexter witnessed him. Investigating Vicky Noonan, the woman murdered thirty years prior, Debra (Jennifer Carpenter) visits her husband Eddie in prison, who was convicted for her murder. Noonan maintains his innocence, and reiterates he was not involved in Lisa Bell's murder either. Debra believes Lundy (Keith Carradine) only returned to pursue her, but he finally reveals his investigation into the Trinity Killer. Somewhere, Trinity Killer (John Lithgow) stalks a woman, discovering that she has a son. The child runs into him, and he walks away to avoid suspicion.

Dexter goes to the yard where his car is being kept, and discovers that Benito Gomez's remains were not found in his car. Due to his amnesia, he cannot remember where he kept the trash bags. He returns to the boxing arena where he killed him, but struggles to find them. As he is also forced to work on the Vacation Murders, he is forced to deal with Quinn, who wants to befriend him to prevent him from talking about the money, but Dexter is not interested. LaGuerta and Angel (David Zayas) struggle with keeping their affair private, especially when she decides to take Angel off the Vacation Murders case.

Trinity once again stalks the woman, Tarla Grant (Suzanne Cryer), "running into" her and helping her with her groceries. After finally uncovering a lead in the Vacation Murders case, Dexter returns to the boxing arena, having realized that a blood spot he thought he forgot to clean up was caused because he kept the trash bags inside the boxing bag. He retrieves the bags and disposes of them properly. Returning home, he has a conversation with Harry (James Remar) over his struggle in balancing his home life with his Dark Passenger. As he goes to sleep, he is awakened by Harrison crying.

== Production ==
=== Development ===
The episode was written by executive producer Charles H. Eglee, and was directed by Brian Kirk. This was Eglee's third writing credit, and Kirk's first directing credit.

== Reception ==
=== Viewers ===
In its original American broadcast, "Remains to Be Seen" was seen by an estimated 1.37 million household viewers with a 0.6/1 in the 18–49 demographics. This means that 0.6 percent of all households with televisions watched the episode, while 1 percent of all of those watching television at the time of the broadcast watched it. This was a 10% decrease in viewership from the previous episode, which was watched by an estimated 1.52 million household viewers with a 0.8/2 in the 18–49 demographics.

=== Critical reviews ===
"Remains to Be Seen" received positive reviews from critics. Matt Fowler of IGN gave the episode a "great" 8.5 out of 10, and wrote, "Just when you thought Dexter might get some much needed shut-eye, he's thrown into a frantic mystery where his identity as a killer is in serious danger of being exposed. "Remains To Be Seen" definitely harkens back to the feel of Season 2 and the search for the Bay Harbor Butcher, with Dexter working in nervous haste to try and cover his tracks. But this time he's investigating his own crime scene."

Emily St. James of The A.V. Club gave the episode a "B" grade and wrote, "Trinity's a bit disconnected from the storyline in a way that should irritate but somehow doesn't. That he's out there, sort of a ghost who will inevitably bump into Dexter at some point, feels strangely promising, even if it's hard to squash the fear that he'll just end up strapped to Dexter's table in the finale." Kristal Hawkins of Vulture wrote, "The suspense isn't exactly killing us. Mild-mannered Arthur Mitchell will strike again next week, probably at the woman he and his pup Checkers just charmed. Dexter will feel guilty about not helping Lundy earlier. And Trinity and Dexter shall eventually meet. The real drama is in Dexter's chest and maybe retire if he has to. That's just so crazy it might work."

Alan Sepinwall wrote, "I don't think the show functions very well as a straight mystery, and that "Remains to Be Seen" was therefore the weakest of the four episodes I got to see before the season began." Gina DiNunno of TV Guide wrote, "Dexter brushes off the warning and goes to bed in dire need of sleep. But the second he closes his eyes, all we hear is the sound of a screaming baby. Poor Dexter."

Danny Gallagher of TV Squad wrote, "Harry has become an interesting vehicle for Dexter's thought output. His Obi-Won presence in Dexter's private moments are a weird blend of dark humor and deep thought and make a good stand-in when Dexter's long thoughts start to wear thin. It also has me wondering if we'll ever see the dark side of Dexter's consciousness in human form, his "Darth Passenger" if you will." Television Without Pity gave the episode an "B–" grade.
