= Slack Tide (Dexter) =

- Dexter episode
- Episode no.: Season 4 Episode 7
- Directed by: Tim Hunter
- Written by: Scott Buck
- Cinematography by: Romeo Tirone
- Editing by: Stewart Schill
- Original release date: November 8, 2009
- Running time: 53 minutes

Guest appearances
- John Lithgow as Arthur Mitchell (special guest star); Courtney Ford as Christine Hill; Greg Ellis as Jonathan Farrow; Mary Mara as Valerie Hodges

Episode chronology
← Previous "If I Had a Hammer"	Next → "Road Kill"
- Dexter season 4

"Slack Tide" is the seventh episode of the fourth season of the American crime drama television series Dexter. It is the 43rd overall episode of the series and was written by executive producer Scott Buck, and was directed by Tim Hunter. It originally aired on Showtime on November 8, 2009.

Set in Miami, the series centers on Dexter Morgan, a forensic technician specializing in bloodstain pattern analysis for the fictional Miami Metro Police Department, who leads a secret parallel life as a vigilante serial killer, hunting down murderers who have not been adequately punished by the justice system due to corruption or legal technicalities. In the episode, Dexter targets a photographer suspected of having killed models, while Debra returns to the field.

According to Nielsen Media Research, the episode was seen by an estimated 1.76 million household viewers and gained a 0.9/2 ratings share among adults aged 18–49. The episode received generally positive reviews from critics, who praised the ending and themes.

== Plot ==
Dexter (Michael C. Hall) is called to a crime scene in the swamp, where a dismembered human arm is found inside an alligator. The arm belonged to a Latina model, who had a photoshoot with photographer Jonathan Farrow (Greg Ellis) on the day she disappeared. When Farrow comes for questioning, he disgusts everyone with his personality, but provides an alibi.

Debra (Jennifer Carpenter) returns to the field after recovering from her wound. When Christine (Courtney Ford) tries to talk to Debra, Dexter prevents her from getting near her. As Quinn (Desmond Harrington) comes to defend her, Dexter threatens Quinn that he could reveal that he stole money from the crime scene if Christine comes close to her again. Later, Debra moves into Dexter's apartment, raising Quinn's suspicions over Dexter's life. Debra also meets with Valerie Hodges (Mary Mara), an informant who worked for Harry (James Remar). Valerie confirms sleeping with Harry, but reveals that Harry actually had sex with all of his informants. Heartbroken, she gives up her research and entrusts the files to Dexter, who destroys Laura Moser's file.

Dexter once again meets with Arthur (John Lithgow), asking for his help in building a connection with his family. Arthur suggests getting his children to do other activities, which Dexter finds helpful to his vigilantism. Dexter convinces Cody (Preston Bailey) in taking part of a young sailors club. Later, Dexter accompanies Arthur in chopping a tree. On the way back, they hit a deer, which disturbs Arthur. Arthur cannot bring himself to put the animal out of its misery, so Dexter does it for him, missing his chance in killing Arthur. Using the lumber, Arthur builds a coffin for the deer.

Dexter stops focusing on Arthur, to instead target Farrow. Angel (David Zayas) has discovered that more models who worked with him have also gone missing, apparently killing Latina models who were in America illegally (ensuring no missing persons reports would be filed). He sneaks into Farrow's studio, discovering blood and a fingernail belonging to the woman in the swamp, confirming the murder took place there. He follows Farrow to a club to kill him, but realizes that Quinn is following him. He gets a girl to distract Quinn, allowing him to escape but delaying the murder.

Despite being forced to accompany Cody on a weekend getaway with the young sailors club, Dexter still leaves during the night while everyone sleeps so he can murder Farrow. He sedates Farrow at his house and brings him to his kill table. Farrow denies killing the models, claiming he only photographs the brutality so they can "live forever." Dexter is unmoved, and kills him. A few days, he is shocked when he finds that Farrow's assistant has been arrested. Angel reveals that it was the assistant who killed the models, as they have footage and DNA to corroborate it. A shaken Dexter goes to his office, disturbed by realizing he killed an innocent person, violating the Code of Harry.

== Production ==
=== Development ===
The episode was written by executive producer Scott Buck, and was directed by Tim Hunter. This was Buck's eighth writing credit, and Hunter's second directing credit.

== Reception ==
=== Viewers ===
In its original American broadcast, "Slack Tide" was seen by an estimated 1.76 million household viewers with a 0.9/2 in the 18–49 demographics. This means that 0.9 percent of all households with televisions watched the episode, while 2 percent of all of those watching television at the time of the broadcast watched it. This was a 7% decrease in viewership from the previous episode, which was watched by an estimated 1.88 million household viewers with a 0.9/2 in the 18–49 demographics.

=== Critical reviews ===
"Slack Tide" received generally positive reviews from critics. Matt Fowler of IGN gave the episode a "great" 8.2 out of 10, and wrote, "One of the things that really stood out for me in this episode was Dexter's need to kill Farrow coming off as the need of a true addict. Dexter stealing off into the night during Cody's sailor camp-out trip was really desperate and you could just tell that it was going to lead to something awful in the end."

Emily St. James of The A.V. Club gave the episode a "C" grade and wrote, "The show has feinted going in this direction in the past, but it's never bit the bullet and actually headed down that particularly dark alley. But if the show is finally going to pull some of these stories together in the end, it's going to need to head down that alley more fully. Is it finally doing so? I hope so, but time will tell." Kristal Hawkins of Vulture wrote, "Poor Harry. His son has a new father figure, and his daughter's research is shattering her image of dear old dad. But lucky us: A shocking turn in the case of the sleazy photographer turns this season upside down."

Billy Grifter of Den of Geek wrote, "Slack Tide is such a fantastic piece of TV, I have no inclination to significantly spoil it for anyone who likes this show, as the parts mesh like a Swiss watch." Gina DiNunno of TV Guide wrote, "For the first time, Dexter has broken his own code and killed an innocent man. Now nothing separates him from other murderers."

Danny Gallagher of TV Squad wrote, "This week's episode did have some very great moments that showed glimmers of the show's glory days, but the rest got bogged down in the same sidetracks that have dragged the rest of the season down with it. The plots may be in different pieces, but they are all in the same garbage bag as they float through the Gulf Stream." Television Without Pity gave the episode a "B" grade.
