= Dex Takes a Holiday =

- Dexter episode
- Episode no.: Season 4 Episode 4
- Directed by: John Dahl
- Written by: Melissa Rosenberg; Wendy West
- Cinematography by: Romeo Tirone
- Editing by: Stewart Schill
- Original release date: October 18, 2009
- Running time: 55 minutes

Guest appearances
- John Lithgow as Arthur Mitchell (special guest star); David Ramsey as Anton Briggs; Courtney Ford as Christine Hill; Christina Cox as Zoey Kruger; Tim Maculan as Sam; Sharon Sachs as Realtor; Keith Carradine as Frank Lundy

Episode chronology
| ← Previous "Blinded by the Light" | Next → "Dirty Harry" |
- Dexter season 4

"Dex Takes a Holiday" is the fourth episode of the fourth season of the American crime drama television series Dexter. It is the 40th overall episode of the series and was written by executive producer Melissa Rosenberg and supervising producer Wendy West, and was directed by John Dahl. It originally aired on Showtime on October 18, 2009.

Set in Miami, the series centers on Dexter Morgan, a forensic technician specializing in bloodstain pattern analysis for the fictional Miami Metro Police Department, who leads a secret parallel life as a vigilante serial killer, hunting down murderers who have not been adequately punished by the justice system due to corruption or legal technicalities. In the episode, Dexter targets a police officer while Rita and the kids go out of town. Meanwhile, Debra decides to go back with Lundy.

According to Nielsen Media Research, the episode was seen by an estimated 1.51 million household viewers and gained a 0.7/2 ratings share among adults aged 18–49. The episode received critical acclaim, who praised the ending.

== Plot ==
Rita (Julie Benz) takes the kids out of town for a wedding, leaving Dexter (Michael C. Hall) alone for three days. Rejoicing his "vacation", Dexter intends to use it to target a new victim: Zoey Kruger (Christina Cox), a Pembroke Pines police officer suspected of having killed her husband and child, while a man, Darius Rey, was framed and killed during the home invasion.

As he gathers evidence, Dexter visits Zoey's house during an open house, hoping to find gloves that may confirm her involvement. He checks her garbage disposal, discovering blood and gunshot residue. Later, he is pulled over in his car by Zoey, who has discovered his job at Miami Metro. She lets him go, but warns him to stay away from her. The Trinity Killer (John Lithgow) stalks a man outside a bar, and then provokes him into punching him. Sensing a pattern, Lundy (Keith Carradine) visits a hotel where a previous murder occurred thirty years prior, and runs into Trinity. Trinity evades Lundy, aware that he has been discovered.

To attract Zoey, Dexter requests Darius Rey's file, causing her to follow him. She confronts him at a gas station, and Dexter makes it clear he knows she killed her family and will report it. Zoey threatens to accuse him of raping her, which Dexter disputes as the blood pattern will not be in her favor. Angel (David Zayas) and LaGuerta (Lauren Vélez) question over revealing their relationship, so they each ask Dexter for advice. Debra (Jennifer Carpenter) continues debating over her feelings for Lundy, especially when Anton (David Ramsey) starts to feel jealous. That night, she visits him at his hotel room, where they have sex.

As Dexter anticipates, Zoey sneaks into his house to kill him, only to be sedated instead. He takes her to her daughter's room, where he has staged her fleeing the country while evidence will be sent to close her case. Dexter concludes she killed her family to avoid her responsibilities and to feel free, which she confirms. He kills her and returns home in time to clean up just before Rita and the kids arrive. Elsewhere, Debra and Lundy talk over their encounter as she leaves the hotel's parking lot. Suddenly, an assailant shoots them, critically wounding Debra and killing Lundy. The assailant robs Lundy and flees the scene. Debra says "stay with me" before losing consciousness.

== Production ==
=== Development ===
The episode was written by executive producer Melissa Rosenberg and supervising producer Wendy West, and was directed by John Dahl. This was Rosenberg's ninth writing credit, and Dahl's third directing credit.

== Reception ==
=== Viewers ===
In its original American broadcast, "Dex Takes a Holiday" was seen by an estimated 1.51 million household viewers with a 0.7/2 in the 18–49 demographics. This means that 0.7 percent of all households with televisions watched the episode, while 2 percent of all of those watching television at the time of the broadcast watched it. This was a 21% increase in viewership from the previous episode, which was watched by an estimated 1.24 million household viewers with a 0.5/1 in the 18–49 demographics.

=== Critical reviews ===
"Dex Takes a Holiday" received critical acclaim. Matt Fowler of IGN gave the episode an "amazing" 9 out of 10, and wrote, "Yes, "Dex Takes A Holiday" was the perfect episode for both the Dexter character, and his devoted fans. After three weeks of watching Dexter squirm under security lights and suffer from sleep deprivation, we all were due for a break. It's a good thing too, since Rita seems to be getting closer and closer to Dexter's Dark Passenger."

Emily St. James of The A.V. Club gave the episode an "A–" grade and wrote, "I think that most of us thought Lundy would die (likely at the hands of Trinity), and I doubt the show will actually kill off Deb, but by making the Vacation Murders killer an actual player in the storyline (though I suppose it could be Trinity aping another killer or something), the series heightens all of its dramatic players. There are three genuine threats on the loose in Miami now, and the new question is which is going to take the other two out."

Kristal Hawkins of Vulture wrote, "This week, in a startling development, Dexter finds himself identifying with a killer. Stifle that yawn. Just when Dexter's family-free staycation looks to be treading familiar territory, it takes a turn. And, more importantly, the Trinity Killer case gets intense, culminating in a highly suspenseful final scene." Billy Grifter of Den of Geek wrote, "Dexter is by far the best show I'm currently watching, and "Dex Takes A Holiday" just underlined that in big read marker pen."

Alan Sepinwall wrote, "Dexter got to go on the hunt, and be scolded by Harry's ghost again about the limits of married life. But there's a rote quality to his kills at this point, as if we're just marking time until his path crosses with Trinity's." Gina DiNunno of TV Guide wrote, "All we see is a person in all black steal Lundy's wallet and watch. Is the Vacation Murderer to blame? Possibly. But perhaps it was a scared serial killer, or jealous boyfriend looking to pin the blame on someone else."

Danny Gallagher of TV Squad wrote, "Debra and Lundy's mysterious shooting was jarring and had me aching to know the trigger man, but what happens then? How can a show get better without killing off the entire cast Dynasty style?" Television Without Pity gave the episode a "B" grade.

Keith Carradine submitted this episode for consideration for Outstanding Guest Actor in a Drama Series at the 62nd Primetime Emmy Awards.
