= The Getaway (Dexter) =

- Dexter episode
- Episode no.: Season 4 Episode 12
- Directed by: Steve Shill
- Story by: Scott Reynolds; Melissa Rosenberg
- Teleplay by: Wendy West; Melissa Rosenberg
- Original air date: December 13, 2009

Guest appearances
- John Lithgow as Arthur Mitchell; Geoff Pierson as Tom Matthews; Mary Mara as Valerie Hodges; Christina Robinson as Astor Bennett; Preston Bailey as Cody Bennett; Julia Campbell as Sally Mitchell; Brando Eaton as Jonah Mitchell; Vanessa Marano as Becca Mitchell; Jim Metzler as Agent Davis; Jake Short as Scott Smith; Roger Ranney as Nick Smith

Episode chronology
← Previous "Hello, Dexter Morgan"	Next → "My Bad"
- Dexter (season 4)

"The Getaway" is the fourth season finale of the American television drama series Dexter, and the 48th overall episode of the series. It originally aired on Showtime on December 13, 2009. In the episode, Dexter goes to great lengths to stop Arthur, who now knows Dexter's true identity. Meanwhile, Debra learns the truth about Dexter's mother, the homicide division closes in on the Trinity Killer, and Rita reaffirms her support for Dexter, even as she acknowledges his hidden demons.

The teleplay was written by Wendy West and Melissa Rosenberg, based on a story by Rosenberg and Scott Reynolds. Directed by Steve Shill, "The Getaway" marked the conclusion of the Trinity Killer plotline, as well as the final regular appearance of guest star John Lithgow, who portrayed Arthur Mitchell and Julie Benz, a regular cast member since the beginning of the series. To protect the twist ending, Dexter producers imposed strict security measures, which included the distribution of fake alternate endings and forcing staff members to sign non-disclosure agreements.

"The Getaway" received critical acclaim, with several commentators calling the twist ending shocking, unexpected and likely to change the direction of the entire series. According to Nielsen ratings, the episode was watched by 2.6 million households, making it the most-watched original series episode in Showtime's history.

== Plot ==
Having learned the truth about Dexter's identity, Arthur warns Dexter to leave him alone. When he leaves, Dexter follows Arthur in his van, accidentally striking another car on his way. Dexter follows Arthur to a bank, where he sees him bring a large envelope back to the van. Dexter attacks and knocks out Arthur, and realizes the envelope is filled with cash. Dexter plans to kidnap and kill Arthur, but he spots the driver of the car he struck earlier talking to police officers. Dexter hides the envelope and confronts the irritable driver. He attacks the driver and is detained by the police. By the time he is released, Arthur is gone, but Dexter recovers the envelope.

Meanwhile, Debra continues looking into Harry's mysterious lover. An old informant of Harry's takes Debra to what she recognizes as Brian Moser's house. The informant reveals the woman's name was Laura Moser, and while researching her, Debra learns she was the biological mother of both Dexter and Brian. The police discover Trinity's true identity. At Arthur's house, Debra confronts Dexter, who feigns surprise and fears Debra is close to realizing his secret life. Instead, Debra says she believes the Ice Truck Killer used her to get to him, and she reasserts how much she loves her foster brother.

Inspired partially by Debra, and partially by his desire to be a better family man than Arthur, Dexter considers giving up murder. After convincing Rita to leave town, he tracks down and captures Arthur. Dexter insists he is not like Arthur, but Arthur insists they are both the same. Arthur tells Dexter that "it's already over" before Dexter kills him with a framing hammer. While disposing of Arthur's body, Dexter comes to realize that his love for his family is beginning to outweigh his need to kill, and he begins to hope for a future without killing. But upon returning home, he finds a message from Rita that she came home from the airport because she forgot her identification. Dexter returns her phone call, only to find that her cell phone and bags are still in the house. Dexter hears Harrison crying in the bathroom and finds Rita dead in the bathtub, having been killed by Arthur, with Harrison sitting in a pool of Rita's blood on the bathroom floor, in the same manner that Dexter was left in a pool of his mother's blood during his childhood.

== Production ==
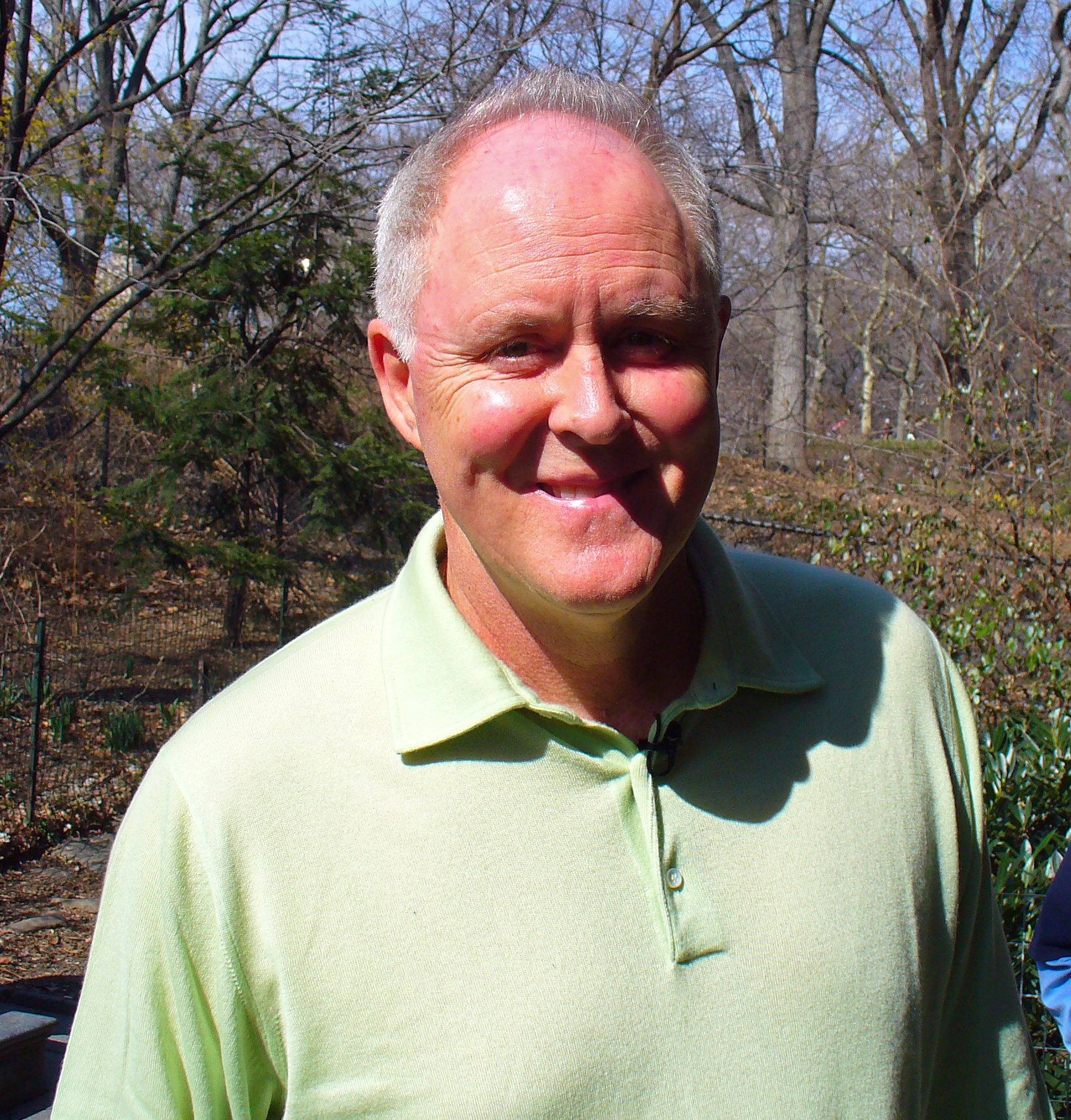
"The Getaway" featured the series' final performance of John Lithgow (pictured), who played the Trinity Killer throughout the fourth season.

"The Getaway", the Dexter fourth season finale, was directed by Steve Shill. The teleplay was written by Wendy West and Melissa Rosenberg, based on a story by Rosenberg and Scott Reynolds. It was the final episode helmed by show runner and executive producer Clyde Phillips before his departure from the show to spend more time with his family. Filming on "The Getaway" ended on October 13, 2009, and the episode was originally aired on Showtime on December 13. "The Getaway" marked the conclusion of a season-long plotline regarding the Trinity Killer, which featured John Lithgow as a serial killer and the primary antagonist of the fourth season. The episode also included the death of Rita Morgan, who had been a regular character since the beginning of the series. Although her death is off-screen and the killer is not specifically identified, it is strongly suggested she was killed by Arthur Mitchell, which Lithgow himself confirmed to be true in an interview that aired on Showtime immediately after the episode was originally broadcast. Clyde Phillips said the ramifications "The Getaway" would have on the future of the series had not yet been determined, as brainstorming for the fifth season was not set to begin until February 2010.

Rita's death was alluded to by Dexter producers, who told media outlets "The Getaway" included a series-changing twist, leading to widespread speculation about the possibility of a character death, or the possibility of Debra Morgan learning the truth about her brother's homicidal nature. Extra security precautions were taken to prevent the finale's secrets from becoming exposed. Network staff members were forced to sign non-disclosure agreements, and decoy scripts were drafted and disseminated to protect the twist ending. In one of the fake alternate endings, Dexter learned on the news about a child murderer escaping from prison, and the episode would end with Dexter trying to decide whether to join Rita on vacation or go after the escaped killer. Nobody but essential cast and staff were allowed on the set during filming of the episode, and the scripts and DVDs of the episode were watermarked before they were taken off the set.

Phillips claimed the Dexter staff did not know how the finale would conclude until late in the season, but Phillips said Rita's death began to feel inevitable as the story evolved. However, Julie Benz said she had been told John Lithgow knew about it from the beginning of the season. Phillips said the staff felt obligated to do more than simply kill the Trinity Killer in the final episode, especially because he felt the death of Miguel Prado (played by Jimmy Smits), the villain of Season 3, was not handled "as well as we could have". The writers discussed the idea of having Debra find out about Dexter's secret life, but it was decided they could not anticipate how drastically the series would be changed by that revelation. Benz heard rumors from David Zayas that her character would be killed in the episode, but she was not officially notified until late September, when the producers held a meeting with her the day before the season finale script was distributed to the cast. She said, "It was a tough meeting. In a bizarre way, it felt like a scene from Defending Your Life." Benz was unhappy about the news, but she handled it professionally. Benz described the death scene as "very poetic".

Undoubtedly, Dexter is permanently changed because of what Trinity has done, because of Rita's murder. ... Perhaps he'll slam shut every door he's opened in terms of his emotional human self. It's hard to say definitively exactly what will change and how it will change, but change is inevitable.

— Michael C. Hall

Executive Producer Sara Colleton said it was difficult to kill off a long-standing character, but they felt "this is where Dexter needed to be taken". She also felt the motives for Arthur killing Rita were deliberately made to be open to various interpretations, including that Arthur may have killed her "in a bizarre way to trigger Dexter to deal with who he really is". When asked whether Arthur told Rita about Dexter's secret life before killing her, Phillips said the answer had not been determined because the fifth season was not yet planned, but he added, "I would think that he did not tell her". Michael C. Hall called the ending a "really bold stroke" that would reset the stage of the series just as the Dexter Morgan character began to feel he could live with an emotional connection to his wife and family. Hall also said of the ending, "More than anything I felt for the audience. I think this is the kind of thing that's really going to tie people in knots."

Lithgow called Rita's death a "fantastic choice", which he said shed an entirely different light on the final scene between Dexter and Arthur, which appears to be somewhat sympathetic before the audience learned what Arthur had done. Lithgow said he knew that Arthur would be killed from the very beginning of the season. He said he particularly enjoyed working with Michael C. Hall in "The Getaway", and particularly cited the opening scene in the police station, where he said Hall was "so great at working out the rhythms and finding the real meaning" of the moment where Dexter realizes Arthur has the advantage over him. Lithgow also said he enjoyed their final scene together, including the moment where he realized his daughter had committed suicide: "It's very unusual for a character that despicable to have a moment like that, a moment of such pain."

== Reception ==
=== Ratings ===
"The Getaway" broke several records for the Showtime cable network. The finale episode was seen by 2.6 million households, according to Nielsen ratings, making it the most-watched original series episode in the network's history. This rating surpassed the record that had been broken just a week prior by the Dexter episode, Hello, Dexter Morgan, which was seen by 2.1 million households. The pair of Dexter episodes were the most watched Showtime telecast since the October 23, 1999 broadcast of a boxing match between Mike Tyson and Orlin Norris. "The Getaway" was seen by 54 percent more viewers than the third season finale, "Do You Take Dexter Morgan?", which aired on December 14, 2008. The high ratings for "The Getaway" gave a boost to the third season finale of Californication, which aired immediately after the Dexter season finale. The Californication episode, Mia Culpa, was seen by 1.1 million households, the highest ever viewership for the series.

=== Critical reaction ===
The episode received critical acclaim and has been cited by many critics as one of the best in the series, with several commentators calling the twist ending shocking, unexpected and likely to change the direction of the entire series. Entertainment Weekly television writer Ken Tucker praised the twist of the episode, which he said, "sent the series spinning into a whole new direction for next season". Tucker praised the Dexter writing staff, "for maintaining the suspense while creating a whole new world within the Dexter world: the awful universe of Trinity and his own trapped family." Bill Harris of the Toronto Sun said the episode was good before the final scene, but that the twist shed a whole different light on several scenes. Harris said of the twist, "It's nice to know TV can still be that impactful, isn't it? But my God, what a stunner."

IGN reviewer Matt Fowler gave the episode an "Incredible" rating of 9.6/10, saying that: "I'm sure we all loved Dexter's final moments with Arthur, down in the toy train bomb shelter, but now looking back at the scene, knowing the final moments of the episode, it's filled with so many more eerie easter eggs. Something was definitely up when Arthur said, "It's already over." We all thought so because we've heard him say those words before. We also saw Dexter take a beat after the line, confused about its meaning. We could have chalked it up to the fact that Arthur was accepting his own death, but Dexter's furrowed brow let us know that something more sinister was in play here. Of course, the real bitch here is that Dexter, having dispatched of Trinity officially, now can't go back and do it with the spirit of vengeance. The scene stands quite beautifully on its own, but Dexter would certainly have not given Arthur an empathetic send off if he knew what that monster had done. We can all point fingers at certain missteps that Dexter took throughout the entire season - mistakes that led to Rita's demise - but when you take it in as a whole it's a rather satisfying and cleverly constructed story that actually made us all buy and believe, by the end, that Dexter truly wanted to be rid of his murderous spirit. His stubborn need to kill Trinity himself wound up circumventing the entire justice system, which would have wound up catching Arthur based solely on Deb's tenacity and expert detective work." Also, IGN listed Arthur Mitchell as 2nd on a list of Dexter's Top 10 Kills, saying that "This was the murder that America was clamoring for. And it was effin' great." In his review of the entire fourth season, Fowler, giving the season an "Incredible" rating of 9.5, said of the finale that "It all just came off as a ton of creepy, guilty fun. I would bet that when we all saw the final scene of the season finale that we, simply due to the time we've spent on the characters over four years, felt a ton of emotions that we might not have even known were there."

E! writer Kristin Dos Santos called the ending "horrifying", and said of Rita, "This death just might go down as one of the most shocking deaths ever on television." Claire Zulkey said that the twist ending was intense, and the teleplay was woven to feature several moments that had led her to suspect different conclusions. She also praised what he expected to be a "re-set" of the series with Rita's death. Marcia White of The Express-Times declared Dexter "one of the best cable dramas on TV", and called the final scene between Dexter and Arthur particularly touching. Mark Dawidziak of The Plain Dealer said the episode was shocking and suspenseful, and called Dexter "a series that leaves you guessing as the psychological ambiguities run deeper and darker".

=== Awards ===
The director of "The Getaway", Steve Shill, won the Primetime Emmy Award for Outstanding Directing for a Drama Series for this episode. In addition, Matthew V. Colonna was nominated for Outstanding Single-Camera Picture Editing for a Drama Series.

Award	Category	Nominee	Result
Primetime Emmy Awards	Outstanding Directing for a Drama Series	Steve Shill	Won
Primetime Emmy Awards	Outstanding Single-Camera Picture Editing for a Drama Series	Matthew V. Colonna	Nominated
Primetime Emmy Awards	Primetime Emmy Award for Outstanding Lead Actor in a Drama Series	Michael C. Hall	Nominated
