= Love Boat: The Next Wave =

- Based on: The Love Boats by Jeraldine Saunders
- Developed by: Brenda Hampton; Catherine LePard
- Starring: Robert Urich; Phil Morris; Tim Maculan; Joan Severance; Corey Parker; Randy Vasquez
- Theme music composer: Charles Fox
- Opening theme: "The Love Boat" performed by Paul Williams
- Composer: Kevin Kiner
- Country of origin: United States
- Original language: English
- No. of seasons: 2
- No. of episodes: 25

Production
- Executive producers: David Landsberg; Jonathan Schmock; Aaron Spelling; E. Duke Vincent
- Running time: 60 minutes
- Production company: Spelling Television

Original release
- Network: UPN
- Release: April 13, 1998 – May 21, 1999

Related
- The Love Boat

Love Boat: The Next Wave is an American comedy television series that aired on UPN from April 13, 1998, to May 21, 1999. It was a revival of the original run of the ABC series The Love Boat from 1977 to 1986.

== Plot ==
Set aboard the cruise ship Sun Princess, the series starred Robert Urich as Captain Jim Kennedy, a retired and divorced U.S. Navy officer with a teen-aged son, Danny (Kyle Howard). Phil Morris played Chief Purser Will Sanders, and Joan Severance played Security Chief Camille Hunter.

=== "Reunion" episode ===
A reunion-themed episode reunited some cast members of the original The Love Boat – Gavin MacLeod (Captain Stubing), Bernie Kopell (Dr. Adam "Doc" Bricker), Ted Lange (Isaac Washington), Jill Whelan (Vicki Stubing) and Lauren Tewes (Julie McCoy). This episode revealed that Julie and "Doc" had been in love all along.

== Cast ==
=== Main ===
- Robert Urich as Captain Jim Kennedy III
- Phil Morris as Chief Purser Will Sanders
- Stacey Travis as Cruise Director Suzanne Zimmerman (season 1)
- Corey Parker as Ship's Doctor John Morgan
- Randy Vasquez as Bar Manager Paolo Kaire
- Kyle Howard as Danny Kennedy
- Joan Severance as Security Chief Camille Hunter
- Heidi Mark as Cruise Director Nicole Jordan (season 2)

=== Recurring ===
- Tim Maculan as Donald Griswald

== Episodes ==
=== Series overview ===
Season	Episodes	Originally released	
Season	Episodes	First released	Last released
1	6	April 13, 1998	May 18, 1998
2	19	October 9, 1998	May 21, 1999

=== Season 1 (1998) ===
No. overall	No. in season	Title	Directed by	Written by	Original release date	Prod. code
1	1	"Smooth Sailing"	Dennis Dugan	Kay Camden & Elizabeth Orange	April 13, 1998	4198-001
The Sun Princess welcomes a new captain (Robert Urich)--and his son (Kyle Howard), who has had problems with the law. The captain tries to delegate his parental duties to the ship's staff only to learn that what his son really wants is a father. A comedian (Lenny Clarke) hired for the cruise brings his girlfriend (Talia Balsam), who has agreed to move in with him. However, when his routine features jokes that demean the institution of marriage, she is upset. In the third story, a young man (Kadeem Hardison) spies a woman (Shari Headley) across a craps table and decides that the two of them will be married, though they have not met and do not know each other's name. When he does propose suddenly, she agrees to marry him only to develop cold feet when she finds out that the captain, who is to perform the ceremony, is divorced.
2	2	"Remember?"	Tony Mordente	Kay Camden	April 20, 1998	4198-002
The captain's son is attracted to a girl (Jessica Alba) who is traveling with her recently divorced mother (Christine Ebersole). When the two teens sneak off to a broom closet, they are caught, and the girl's mother demands to see the captain. As it turns out, the mother and the captain have a romantic history, and the two of them attempt to rekindle that romance, thoroughly disgusting the teens. A congressman (Paul Satterfield) on the ship is surprised to find his estranged wife (Cari Shayne) on the cruise. The congressman's bodyguard (Ben Reed) hits it off with the ship's chief security officer (Joan Severance), who, in an effort to demonstrate her physical strength, injures herself and tries to hide the injury from the bodyguard. The final storyline involves two Scrabble players who have had an ongoing online romance but never met. They are excited to meet, but when he (Curtis Armstrong) turns out to be significantly shorter than she (Pam Stone), chances of a real-life romance seem to fizzle.
3	3	"I Can't Get No Satisfaction"	David Semel	Michael Norrell	April 27, 1998	4198-004
4	4	"How Long Has This Been Going On?"	Anson Williams	Grace McKeaney	May 4, 1998	4198-005
5	5	"True Course"	Sandy Smolan	Elizabeth Orange	May 11, 1998	4198-003
6	6	"Getting to Know You"	Mel Damski	Van Nieze	May 18, 1998	4198-006

=== Season 2 (1998–99) ===
No. overall	No. in season	Title	Directed by	Written by	Original release date	Prod. code
7	1	"All Aboard"	Bruce Bilson	David Landsberg	October 9, 1998	4198-007
8	2	"It Takes Two to Tango"	Peter Baldwin	Nicole Avril	October 16, 1998	4198-009
9	3	"Captains Courageous"	Tony Mordente	Neal Howard, Ira Fritz	October 23, 1998	4198-010
10	4	"Reunion"	Anson Williams	Ian Praiser	October 30, 1998	4198-008
The original "Love Boat" crew reunites for Vicki's (Jill Whelan) marriage to her fiance, Bill. Captain Stubing (Gavin MacLeod) is Vice President of Princess Cruises. He and his wife are awaiting word on whether he will get promoted to president. Kennedy is nervous about Stubing's visit, and in fact, Stubing makes several critical remarks about the Sun Princess and its crew, making Kennedy even more unsettled. Vicki gets cold feet because Bill fawns over her and appears unable to recognize even a single flaw in her. Isaac (Ted Lange) befriends Paolo and reveals that his time on the Pacific Princess made him unable to maintain a long-term relationship. Meanwhile, Doc (Bernie Kopell) and Corey ogle female passengers and share "war stories" about the women they've bedded. Eventually, Kennedy puts Stubing in his place, and they share a heart-to-heart talk. Stubing learns that he has indeed been promoted, but he informs his wife that (without consulting with her) he has declined the corporate position and instead taken an opening as captain of another ship. Isaac meets a woman he pushes away at first, but they eventually fall in love. Vicki confronts Bill, who expresses his true feelings and insults Vicki several times, which reignites her passion and saves the wedding. Finally, Julie (Lauren Tewes) overhears Doc admitting to Corey that he had secretly been in love with a co-worker during his time on the Pacific Princess. After Julie confronts him, they declare their mutual love. Gopher (Fred Grandy) is mentioned, but his absence is unexplained.
11	5	"All That Glitters"	Craig Zisk	Kimberley Wells	November 6, 1998	4198-012
12	6	"The Bermuda Triangle"	Peter Baldwin	Robert Moloney	November 13, 1998	4198-011
The Sun Princess enters the Bermuda Triangle and rescues a man in the water. The man claims to have been a pilot, but his story seems unlikely in that he claims to have served during the 1940s. Strange events become the norm. The bar manager (Randy Vasquez) suddenly develops almost magical skills of dexterity à la Tom Cruise's character in Cocktail. Chief Purser Will Sanders (Phil Morris), overwhelmed by several problems, finds himself able to tackle his many duties when there are apparently several versions of him on the ship. Security Chief Camille Hunter (Joan Severance) and the rescued aviator are drawn to each other. Cruise Director Nicole Jordan (Heidi Mark) is suddenly in love with the ship's doctor (Corey Parker), apparently returning the feelings he has long held for her. The ship's captain (Robert Urich) meets his dead father, while the captain's son (Kyle Howard) develops the power to read minds.
13	7	"Affairs to Remember"	Joanna Kerns	Robert Moloney	November 20, 1998	4198-013
14	8	"Dust, Lust, Destiny"	Joel Zwick	Mike Lyons & Kimberley Wells	December 18, 1998	4198-015
15	9	"Don't Judge a Book by Its Lover"	Neal Israel	Nicole Avril	January 1, 1999	4198-014
16	10	"Blind Love"	Ted Lange	Ian Praiser	January 22, 1999	4198-016
17	11	"Other People's Business"	Kim Friedman	Mike Chessler & Chris Alberghini	February 5, 1999	4198-017
18	12	"Love Floats: The St. Valentine's Day Massacre"	Tony Mordente	Nicole Avril	February 12, 1999	4198-022
19	13	"Three Stages of Love"	Joel Zwick	Lawrence H. Levy	February 19, 1999	4198-020
20	14	"Divorce, Downbeat and Distemper"	Ted Lange	Charleen Easton	February 26, 1999	4198-021
21	15	"Such Sweet Dreams"	Ted Lange	Charleen Easton	March 19, 1999	4198-019
22	16	"Trances of a Lifetime"	Tony Mordente	David Landsberg	April 30, 1999	4198-025
23	17	"About Face"	Kim Friedman	Arnold Kane, Michael Baum, Charleen Easton	May 7, 1999	4198-023
24	18	"Prom Queen"	Jon Paré	Neal Howard & Ira Fritz	May 14, 1999	4198-018
25	19	"Cuba"	Mel Damski	Robert Moloney	May 21, 1999	4198-024

== Reception ==
Carole Horst of Variety called it "a pleasant one-hour trip" that will appeal to fans of the original show. However, in his review, Ken Tucker of Entertainment Weekly gave the show a grade of D+. The Baltimore Sun's review of the pilot deemed it "titanically bad" and said, "This is the worst series of the entire television season."
