= Outside (2004 film) =

2004 film

Outside is a 2004 short film written and directed by Jenn Kao and starring Courtney Ford.

The film won the Best Science Fiction/Fantasy Film award at the 2006 Comic-Con Independent Film Festival and a 2005 DGA Student Directing Award. The film has screened at over 30 film festivals.

== Plot ==
In post-apocalyptic society, people are isolated in sealed bunkers. A young woman is forced to confront her fears of the unknown when she makes contact with an Outsider.

== Production ==
Outside was produced at the UCLA School of Theater Film and Television. It was writer/director Jenn Kao's MFA thesis film.

== Reviews ==
FilmThreat.com critic Doug Brunnel gave Outside 4 stars and called it "utterly captivating...a great film."

Variety critic Tom McClean, part of the jury that named Outside Best Science Fiction/Fantasy Film at the 2006 Comic-Con International Film Festival, said that Outside was "like one of those great high concept sci-fi films of the 1970s".

== Details ==
- Shooting format: 35mm film
- Running Time: 22 minutes
