= Tim Maculan =

American actor

- Born: April 20, 1963 (age 62); Rockford, Illinois, U.S.
- Occupation: Actor
- Website: www.timmaculan.com

Tim Maculan (born April 20, 1963) is an American film and television actor known for his recurring roles on Six Feet Under and Cybill.

== Early life and education ==
Maculan was born in Rockford, Illinois. He started acting in high school productions as well as in local community and professional theaters. He worked at the Falmouth Playhouse with Van Johnson and William Shatner. Maculan studied at the School of the Art Institute of Chicago and the Theatre School at DePaul University. He later left Chicago for New York City, where he began his professional acting career working in summer stock and regional theatre across the United States.

== Career ==
=== Film and television ===
Maculan has guest starred in over thirty television shows, including Dexter, Grey's Anatomy, Entourage, The Drew Carey Show, Friends, The Larry Sanders Show, Married... with Children, and Aaron Spelling's Love Boat: The Next Wave. Maculan's character on Cybill earned him a GLAAD media award nomination in 1997.

Some of Maculan's film work includes Spider-Man 3 (by director Sam Raimi), Inside Out (with Steven Weber), Matchstick Men (by director Ridley Scott), Duplex (with Ben Stiller and Drew Barrymore).

=== Theatre ===
A founding member of The Actors Space, Inc. in New York, Maculan appeared in their revival of A Hatful of Rain and an earned critical acclaim for his work in Found a Peanut – a show that would launch his career in television when it was remounted in Los Angeles. Maculan created the role of Ezra Twain in the world premiere of Diva at the La Jolla Playhouse in San Diego, California, worked in a national tour of Beauty and the Beast as Cogsworth, a production of South Pacific for the North Carolina Theatre of Raleigh, North Carolina. Maculan starred in Gary Garrison's collection of plays, Verticals and Horizontals at the Cherry Lane Theatre in New York City.

== Filmography ==
=== Film ===
Year	Title	Role	Notes
2003	Matchstick Men	Pharmacist #2	
2003	Duplex	Terrence	
2005	Inside Out	Dr. Robinson	
2007	Spider-Man 3	Play Director	
2014	When Bette Met Mae	Vik	
2015	This Isn't Funny	Dr. Ray Fulsom	
2015	Entourage	Dr. Feldman	

=== Television ===
Year	Title	Role	Notes
1992	Married... with Children	Bank Nerd #2	Episode: "The Old College Try"
1993	Heartbeat	Man at Hospital	Television film
1994	Grace Under Fire	Tee Dub	Episode: "The Road to Paris, Texas"
1995–1998	Cybill	Waiter / Henry VIII / Construction Worker	50 episodes
1996	The Jeff Foxworthy Show	Ranger Dick	Episode: "Merry Christmas, Y'All"
1997	The Larry Sanders Show	Allen	Episode: "The Matchmaker"
1997	Promised Land	Salesman	Episode: "Mirror Image"
1997	Beyond Belief: Fact or Fiction	Mr. Bromley	2 episodes
1997	Night Man	FBI Agent	Episode: "That Ol' Gang of Mine"
1998	Sabrina the Teenage Witch	Marty	Episode: "My Nightmare, the Car"
1998	Love Boat: The Next Wave	Donald Griswald	6 episodes
1999	Beggars and Choosers	Jonathan Murphy	Episode: "The Velvet Curtain"
1999	Chicken Soup for the Soul	Doctor Stokes	Episode: "Mr. McKenzie"
2000	City Guys	Bert	Episode: "Students of the Bride"
2001	Dharma & Greg	Charles	Episode: "The Box"
2001	Some of My Best Friends	Pretentious Man	2 episodes
2001–2005	Six Feet Under	Father Jack	14 episodes
2002	Friends	The Food Critic	Episode: "The One with the Cooking Class"
2004	The Drew Carey Show	Mr. Warwick	Episode: "Sealed in a Kiss"
2004	Still Standing	Store Clerk	Episode: "Still Cooking"
2005	Romy and Michele: In the Beginning	Ned	Television film
2007	Insatiable	Officer Tim Finger	Episode: "Pilot"
2007	Entourage	Antique Dealer	Episode: "Gary's Desk"
2009	Grey's Anatomy	Luke	Episode: "Elevator Love Letter"
2009	Dexter	Sam	Episode: "Dex Takes a Holiday"
2014	Rake	Jerry King	Episode: "Serial Killer"
2018	Here and Now	Mr. Wolfe	2 episodes
2018, 2019	Counterpart	Other Side Operator / Hollow Face	2 episodes
2019	Ripley's Believe It or Not!	The Jeweler	Episode: "Natural Born Thrillers"
