= Clyde Phillips (writer) =

American screenwriter

Clyde B. Phillips
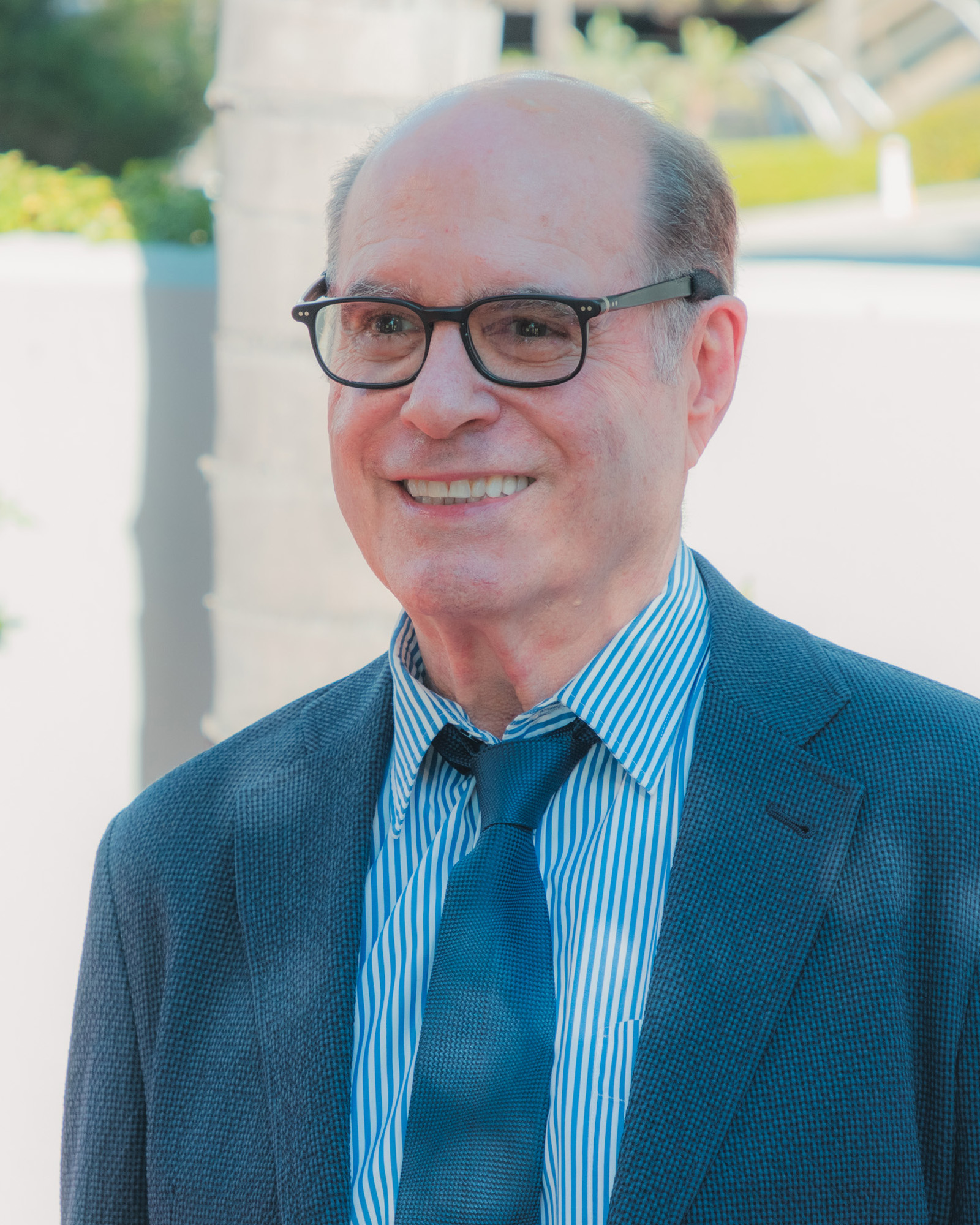
- Phillips in 2026
- Occupations: Film producer, television writer, television producer, novelist

Clyde B. Phillips is an American film producer, television writer, television producer, and novelist.

== Career ==
For the 1970s, Phillips worked at Bob Banner Associates, before starting Blue Hill Avenue Productions with a contract at 20th Century Fox Television. In 1985, he worked on an unsold television pilot Northstar with friend Daniel Grodnik. In 1986, he started working at a job at Columbia Pictures Television to produce their own projects, including Parker Lewis Can't Lose for Fox.

In September 1999, Phillips created the dramedy TV series, Get Real, also airing on Fox. The show was canceled in April 2000 after one season with only two episodes unaired.

Phillips joined the crew of the television drama Dexter as a showrunner, executive producer and writer for the first season, reshooting scenes of the original pilot episode and scrapping others. For his work he was nominated for the Edgar Award for Best Television Episode (Teleplay), for writing the episode "Crocodile", and returned as showrunner, executive producer, and head writer for the next three seasons. Phillips and the writing staff were nominated for a Writers Guild of America Award for Best Dramatic Series at the 2008 ceremony for their work on the second season. The writing staff were nominated for the same award at the 2009 ceremony for their work on the third season. Phillips and the writing staff was nominated for the WGA award a third consecutive time at the 2010 ceremony for their work on the fourth season. Phillips stepped down as showrunner after the fourth season. Dexter was nominated for 18 Emmy Awards under his leadership, including three nominations for Outstanding Drama Series.

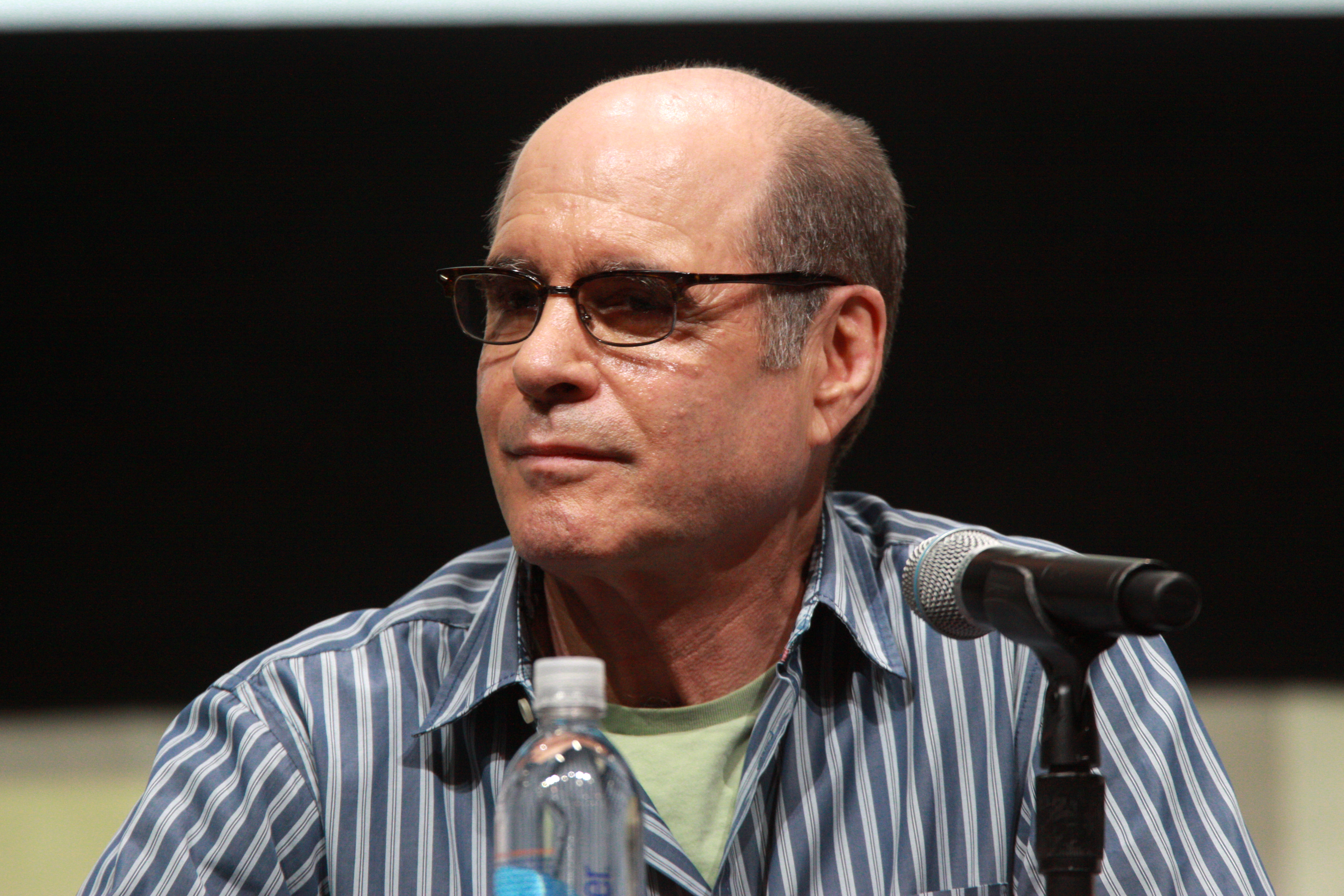
Phillips in 2013

Phillips joined Nurse Jackie for the fifth season, where he served as showrunner and executive producer for its final three seasons.

In 2016, he adapted the Danish series Bankerot into the series Feed the Beast. The series was canceled after one season.

In 2020, it was announced that Phillips would return as showrunner for a 10-episode Dexter revival, titled Dexter: New Blood, that premiered on November 7, 2021.

In 2023, it was announced that Clyde Phillips would return as the showrunner for the prequel series Dexter: Original Sin.

In 2024, it was announced that Clyde Phillips would return as the showrunner for the New Blood follow-up series Dexter: Resurrection.
