= Arthur Mitchell (Dexter) =

Fictional character in the TV series Dexter

- Dexter character
- John Lithgow as Arthur Mitchell
- First appearance: "Living the Dream" (2009)
- Last appearance: "A Beating Heart..." (2025)
- Portrayed by: John Lithgow

In-universe information
- Occupation: High school teacher; Charity volunteer; Church deacon
- Family: Henry Mitchell (father; deceased); Marsha Mitchell (mother; deceased); Vera Mitchell (sister; deceased)
- Spouses: Sally Mitchell (wife; deceased)
- Children: Christine Hill (daughter; deceased); Rebecca Mitchell (daughter; deceased); Jonah Mitchell (son)

Arthur Mitchell, also known as the "Trinity Killer", is a fictional character and one of the main antagonists of the Showtime Dexter television franchise.

Arthur presents himself as an unassuming church deacon, high school teacher and family man, but is secretly a highly prolific serial killer who kills to suppress his childhood trauma derived from accidentally causing his sister's death. Agent Frank Lundy of the Federal Bureau of Investigation dubs him the "Trinity Killer" due to mistakenly assuming a recurring pattern of three killings; slitting a woman's femoral artery while naked in a bathtub, forcing a mother of two to jump off a building, and bludgeoning a father of two with a hammer; It is later revealed that the killings are preceded by Arthur burying a young boy alive in cement.

Arthur is portrayed by American actor John Lithgow, whose performance was widely praised. He won a Golden Globe Award and a Primetime Emmy Award for his performance. In 2016, Rolling Stone ranked him #34 of their "40 Greatest TV Villains of All Time". IGN ranked him #57 of the "Top 100 Villains".

== Development ==
Arthur was created by the executive producer Clyde Phillips for the fourth season of Dexter. He is portrayed by the actor John Lithgow, a prolific actor in stage and screen.

In an interview with The Los Angeles Times, Lithgow recalled being offered the part by Phillips and learning everything about the season before anyone else did, aside from Michael C. Hall. Lithgow noted that his other past portrayals of villains had been one-dimensional and in a single film while Arthur had twelve episodes to show "the gradual revelation of his character", furthering that "the most fascinating thing is that he's an evil man who does not want to be evil. In that sense, he's sort of a mirror image of Dexter, just a much, much more extreme case."

== Fictional biography ==
=== Backstory ===
When Arthur was ten, he spied on his older sister Vera taking a shower; when she saw him, she was so startled that she slipped and fell through the glass door, slicing her femoral artery and bleeding to death. His parents blamed him for Vera's death. His mother committed suicide two years later by jumping out of a window. His father, already a heavy drinker, became an alcoholic and frequently beat his son during his drunken rages. Ultimately, his father was bludgeoned to death with a hammer—it is suggested by Arthur himself. Arthur re-enacts the death of his family in his murders: the young woman represents his sister, the married mother of two represents his mother, the father of two represents his father, and the boy represents Arthur.

=== Killings in Miami ===
Arthur is shown beginning the cycle again, killing his victims at the original murder sites. He punishes himself after each murder: after killing the woman in the bathtub, he takes a shower in scalding hot water; after forcing a mother to fall to her death, he provokes a drunken man into beating him up.

Frank Lundy, an agent of the Federal Bureau of Investigation (FBI), comes out of retirement to hunt the Trinity Killer down, but is shot and killed just as he begins to close in on him. Lundy had theorized that Trinity was a loner who had no life outside killing. When Dexter goes to kill Trinity, he discovers that Trinity is a husband and father, as well as a prominent figure in a charitable Christian homebuilding organization. He uses this organization to travel around the country to cover for his murder spree, and (it is later learned) as a dump site for the first victim in each cycle.

=== Relation with Dexter ===
Dexter is conflicted over whether to kill Arthur or learn how he makes his family life work. Dexter, under the alias of Kyle Butler, befriends Arthur and soon learns that, unlike Dexter, Arthur has no problem being himself with his family or expressing affection. He also witnesses Arthur's strange, unpredictable personality; the same man who murders people with uncommon brutality starts crying when he and Dexter hit a deer on the road, and is appalled at the idea of putting it out of its misery.

As Arthur plans a trip to Tampa, Florida, to build a house, Dexter concocts a plan to go to a meteorological convention to establish an alibi so he has a reason to be in Tampa as well. Arthur reluctantly allows Dexter to tag along when Dexter claims he has done something terrible that only Arthur can help him recover from. Dexter, hoping to redeem his murder of an innocent man, plans to murder the decidedly guilty Arthur along the way. During their road trip, however, Arthur pushes Dexter to admit his terrible deed, and Dexter claims to have killed someone in a hunting accident. This admission greatly affects Arthur, who sees it as a sign of kinship. He takes Dexter to his old home and tells him that when he was ten years old he startled his sister while spying on her in the shower; she fell and broke the glass door, slicing her femoral artery and bleeding to death. His mother later committed suicide by leaping off a building, leaving him in the care of his abusive father; Dexter conjectures that Arthur bludgeoned his father to death, accounting for the third victim.

For the remainder of the trip, Arthur exhibits sudden mood swings and irrational behavior. He keeps telling strangers about his family members' deaths and stresses the need for confession, to the point that Dexter is worried that Arthur might tell people about Dexter's previously mentioned murder. One morning, Dexter sneaks into Arthur's room, intent on killing him, only to find him gone. Dexter tracks him to a construction site where Arthur attempts suicide. Dexter reluctantly stops him, wanting to kill him himself. Dexter contemplates letting him fall to his death, but as he is about to let go, workers at the site come to help Dexter to save him. Afterward, Arthur has a newfound zest for life, believing God sent Dexter to save him.

=== Confrontation with Dexter and death ===
As Dexter gets to know Arthur, he learns that his would-be mentor is not the loving family man he appears to be; Arthur dominates his wife, beats his son, and regularly imprisons his daughter in her room. During Thanksgiving, Arthur's son, Jonah, lashes out at his father, destroying his homebuilder's plaques and smashing his sister's urn. In a fit of rage, Arthur almost strangles Jonah, but Dexter interferes, dragging him into the kitchen. Just as Dexter has Arthur at his mercy, however, Arthur's wife and daughter rush in to stop him.

Dexter witnesses Arthur kidnapping a child but is unable to stop him. Eventually Dexter tracks him down as he is about to bury the boy alive in drying concrete. Dexter saves the boy, but Arthur escapes. After Arthur learns from a news report that the boy is alive and that Dexter did not turn him in, he begins to become suspicious. As he tries to find Dexter he kills a man named Kyle Butler, and ultimately follows Dexter to the Miami Metro Police Department. There, he discovers Dexter's real name.

In the last episode of the season, "The Getaway", Dexter subdues Arthur and prepares to kill him in the room where Arthur had held the kidnapped child. Arthur believes Dexter was sent by God to kill him and claims that he had tried several times to stop killing, but found that he could not change his "path". He predicts a similar fate for Dexter: he tells Dexter "It's already over", the same thing he says to his victims before he kills them. Just as he smiles at the remembrance of his crimes, Dexter hits him in the head with a hammer and kills him.

It is revealed in the final scene of the episode that Arthur had killed Dexter's wife, Rita (Julie Benz), beforehand, in the bathtub of Dexter's house, and that he left Dexter's son Harrison in her blood, mirroring the childhood trauma that put Dexter on the path to becoming a serial killer.

Miami Metro detective Joey Quinn suspects Dexter of killing Rita, and he connects the dots as to the identity of Kyle Butler. Anxious to further his investigation, Quinn requests permission from Captain Maria LaGuerta, but she denies his request and orders him to leave Dexter alone. Undeterred, Quinn finds Jonah Mitchell amidst being relocated into witness protection with the rest of his family, and tries to show him a picture of Dexter so that Jonah can confirm whether it is "Kyle Butler". However, one of the FBI convoys manages to intercept Quinn's attempt before he succeeds, so Quinn's query remains unanswered.

=== Fate of Arthur's family ===
In the sixth season, Dexter hears news about the Mitchell family, who are now living in Nebraska: Arthur's wife, Sally, and daughter, Rebecca, have been murdered in the same way as Arthur's victims. Dexter deduces that Jonah is the killer, and hunts him down. At first, Jonah claims his father killed them both but later gets into a fight with Dexter, seemingly wanting to die by Dexter's hand. Confused, Dexter gets Jonah to confess that Rebecca committed suicide because their mother kept blaming the children for Arthur's capture; upon finding her, Jonah flew into a fit of rage and killed his mother, bludgeoning her in the same manner that his father killed his victims. Dexter tells Jonah to forgive himself and leaves.

=== Dexter: New Blood ===
Arthur's actions—particularly murdering Rita—influence the plot of the 2021–2022 limited series Dexter: New Blood, set ten years after the end of the original series and roughly thirteen years after Arthur's death. Harrison (Jack Alcott), now a teenager, finds out the truth about his mother's death from a true crime podcast, and begins to remember witnessing his mother's murder. He is particularly disturbed by a memory of Arthur smiling at him and saying, "Don't worry, Daddy will be home soon." It is confirmed that seeing his mother's murder traumatized Harrison so badly that he developed homicidal urges like Dexter's.

=== Dexter: Resurrection ===
In March 2025, Lithgow said in an interview that he would reprise his role as Arthur in the series Dexter: Resurrection. "They’re rebooting the entire Michael C. Hall version of 'Dexter.' And it turns out he didn't die after all. I come back sort of as a phantom, as he gradually comes to life on a hospital bed."

Mitchell appears in the series' premiere episode, "A Beating Heart...", in which a comatose Dexter imagines that his old foe is talking to him, "serial killer to serial killer", by his hospital bedside. Dexter accuses Mitchell of turning Harrison into a murderer, but Mitchell counters that Dexter did that on his own. He also appears in Harrison's nightmares after he commits his first murder.

Dexter later discovers that Mitchell is one of the serial killers celebrated in Leon Prater's room of serial killer trophies alongside other infamous serial killers such as John Wayne Gacy, Jeffrey Dahmer, Ted Bundy, Charles Manson, Brian Moser, and even Dexter himself. To celebrate Mitchell is the hammer that Dexter killed him with. Leon calls Mitchell's title a misnomer as he actually killed in fours.

== Reception ==
Mitchell is considered one of the best Dexter villains, ranking in first place in a Screen Rant list, and second in a 10 best Dexter villain performances ranking by MovieWeb.
