= Courtney Ford =

American actress

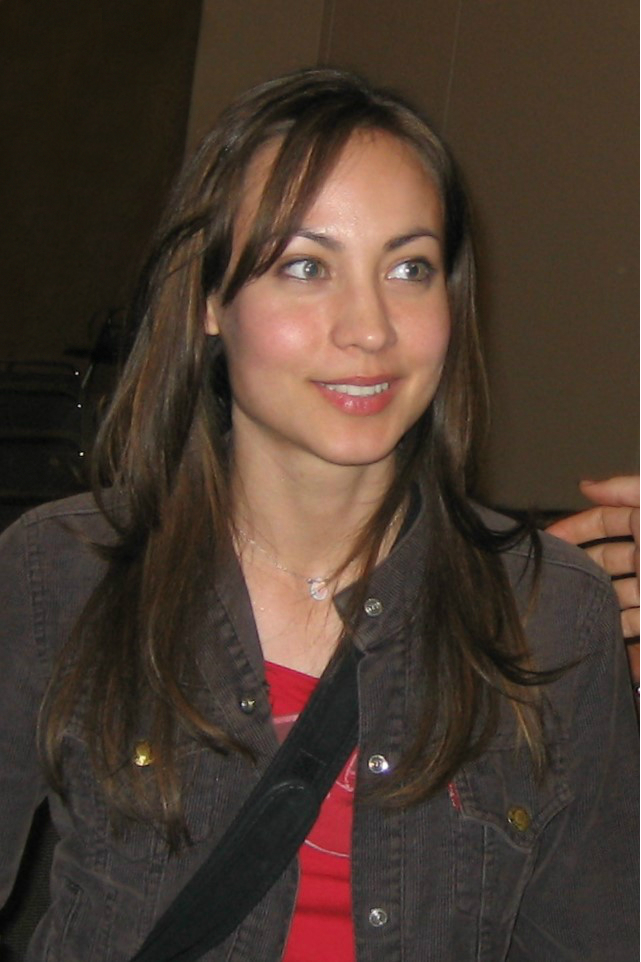
- Ford in 2006
- Born: June 27, 1978 (age 48); Huntington Beach, California, U.S.
- Occupation: Actress
- Years active: 1998–present
- Spouse: Brandon Routh (m. 2007; sep. 2025)
- Children: 1
- Relatives: Roberto Orci (step-brother)

Courtney Ford (born June 27, 1978) is an American actress. She is best known for her roles on television, such as playing Christine Hill on Dexter (2009), Portia Bellefleur on True Blood (2011), Lily on Parenthood (2012), Tonia Pyne on Murder in the First (2014), Kate Taylor on Revenge (2014), Kelly Kline on Supernatural (2016–2018) and Nora Darhk on Legends of Tomorrow (2017–2021). She also played the lead role in the Lifetime television film Kept Woman (2015).

== Early life ==
Ford was born in Huntington Beach, California.

== Career ==
Ford described her career as stagnant for the ten years preceding 2008, in which she considered ceasing work as an actress. However, during what she considered to be her last audition, Ford was cast to play reporter Christine Hill on Showtime's television series Dexter.

She appeared on the HBO series True Blood as Portia Bellefleur, Andy Bellefleur's sister. She was a recurring cast member in the fourth season. In the game series Gears of War, she voices Maria Santiago, the lost wife of the character Dom. In Fallout 4 (2015), Ford voices Piper Wright, a potential companion and the Editor-in-Chief of Diamond City's newspaper, Publick Occurrences.

She also appeared in the ninth episode of season four of How I Met Your Mother titled "The Naked Man" and The Big Bang Theory season five episode "The Good Guy Fluctuation".

Ford first appeared as Nora Darhk, the daughter of Damien Darhk in the Legends of Tomorrow episode "Return of the Mack". She was promoted to series regular prior to the start of season 4. Her (now ex-) husband Brandon Routh was already a series regular since the show began. In August 2019, it was announced that Ford and Routh, whose characters had become romantically linked at this point, would depart Legends of Tomorrow during the fifth season. Their final episode as series regulars was "Romeo v Juliet: Dawn of Justness". They would return for the show's one hundredth episode, as well as separate episodes of The Flash's "Armageddon" event, Ford in part five.

== Personal life ==
Ford and Brandon Routh were engaged on August 23, 2006, after three years of dating, and married November 24, 2007, at El Capitan Ranch in Santa Barbara. They have a son who was born in 2012. Ford filed for divorce on January 8, 2025, citing "irreconcilable differences". As of late January, it was reported that Routh and Ford had reached a divorce settlement and were submitting their paperwork to court.

== Filmography ==
=== Film ===
Year	Title	Role	Notes
1998	BASEketball	Scoreboard Girl	Uncredited
2004	Outside	Devi	Short film
2006	Denial	Woman	Short film
2008	Alien Raiders	Sterling	
2008	Fling	Sam	
2011	The Good Doctor	Stephanie	
2011	Sironia	Amanda	
2014	Missing William	Abigail Leeds	
2015	Kept Woman	Jessica Crowder	
2015	Meet My Valentine	Valentine	
2017	Back To Love	Erica	
2018	The Front Runner	Lynn Armandt	

=== Television ===
Year	Title	Role	Notes
2000	Profiler	Woman	Episode: "Besieged"; uncredited
2001	Moesha	Rita	Episode: "Saving Private Rita"
2003	Threat Matrix	Staci	Episode: "Cold Cash"
2006	Just for Kicks	N/A	Episode: "Alexa in Charge"
2006	Ugly Betty	M.W.	Episode: "Fake Plastic Snow"
2008	Monk	Emily Carter	Episode: "Mr. Monk Gets Hypnotized"
2008	How I Met Your Mother	Vicky	Episode: "The Naked Man"
2008	Criminal Minds	Austin	Episode: "52 Pickup"
2009	Cold Case	Tory Roberts	Episode: "Breaking News"
2009	Dexter	Christine Hill	Recurring role, 11 episodes
2010	Human Target	Laura	Episode: "Rewind"
2010	Grey's Anatomy	Jill Meyer	Episode: "Perfect Little Accident"
2010	NCIS	Petty Officer, 2nd class Kaylen Burrows	Episode: "Patriot Down"
2010	The Vampire Diaries	Vanessa Monroe	Episode: "Bad Moon Rising"
2011	True Blood	Portia Bellefleur	8 episodes
2011	Drop Dead Diva	Gwen Walsh	Episode: "Bride-a-Palooza"
2011	CSI: NY	Nicole Moore	Episode: "Cavallino Rampante"
2011	NTSF:SD:SUV::	European Woman	Episode: "I Left My Heart in Someone's Cooler"
2011	The Big Bang Theory	Alice	Episode: "The Good Guy Fluctuation"
2011	Hawaii Five-0	Suzy Green	Episode: "Ike Maka"
2012	Parenthood	Lily	6 episodes
2014	Murder in the First	Tonia Pyne	4 episodes
2014	Revenge	Kate Taylor	3 episodes
2015	Kept Woman	Jessica Crowder	Television film
2016	Castle	Courtney	Episode: "G.D.S."
2016–2018	Supernatural	Kelly Kline	7 episodes
2017	August Creek	Erica	Television film
2017–2021	Legends of Tomorrow	Nora Darhk	Recurring (season 3); Main (seasons 4-5); Guest (season 7), 28 episodes
2017–2021	Legends of Tomorrow	Marie Antoinette	3 episodes
2020	Home Movie: The Princess Bride	Princess Buttercup / Westley	Episode: "Chapter Six: The Fire Swamp"
2021	The Flash	Nora Darhk	Episode: "Armageddon Part 5"
2022–2023	The Rookie: Feds	SAC Tracy Chiles	Recurring role

=== Video games ===
Year	Title	Role	Notes
2008	Gears of War 2	Maria Santiago	Voice role
2015	Fallout 4	Piper Wright	Voice role
