= List of Dexter characters =

List of characters in the Dexter franchise

This is a list of characters from the Jeff Lindsay novel series Dexter, consisting of Darkly Dreaming Dexter, Dearly Devoted Dexter, Dexter in the Dark, Dexter by Design, Dexter Is Delicious, Double Dexter, the Dexter graphic novel, Dexter's Final Cut, and Dexter Is Dead, the Showtime television series adaptation Dexter, and its revival series Dexter: New Blood, Dexter: Original Sin, and Dexter: Resurrection, the majority of which focus on the exploits of Dexter Morgan (Michael C. Hall), a forensic technician specializing in bloodstain pattern analysis for the fictional Miami Metro Police Department, who leads a secret parallel life as a vigilante serial killer, hunting down murderers who have not been adequately punished by the justice system due to corruption or legal technicalities.

== Overview ==
=== Main cast ===
= Main cast (credited)
= Recurring cast (3+)
= Guest cast (1-2)

Character	Dexter								New Blood	Original Sin	Resurrection	
Character	1	2	3	4	5	6	7	8	New Blood	Original Sin	1	2
Dexter Morgan	Michael C. Hall	Michael C. Hall	Michael C. Hall	Michael C. Hall	Michael C. Hall	Michael C. Hall	Michael C. Hall	Michael C. Hall	Michael C. Hall	Michael C. Hall Patrick Gibson	Michael C. Hall	Michael C. Hall
Rita Bennett	Julie Benz	Julie Benz	Julie Benz	Julie Benz	Julie Benz							
Debra Morgan	Jennifer Carpenter	Jennifer Carpenter	Jennifer Carpenter	Jennifer Carpenter	Jennifer Carpenter	Jennifer Carpenter	Jennifer Carpenter	Jennifer Carpenter	Jennifer Carpenter	Molly Brown		
James Doakes	Erik King	Erik King					Erik King				Erik King	
María LaGuerta	Lauren Vélez	Lauren Vélez	Lauren Vélez	Lauren Vélez	Lauren Vélez	Lauren Vélez	Lauren Vélez			Christina Milian		
Angel Batista	David Zayas	David Zayas	David Zayas	David Zayas	David Zayas	David Zayas	David Zayas	David Zayas	David Zayas (Note: Credited as "Special Guest Star".)	James Martinez	David Zayas	David Zayas
Harry Morgan	James Remar	James Remar	James Remar	James Remar	James Remar	James Remar	James Remar	James Remar		Christian Slater	James Remar	James Remar
Vince Masuka	C. S. Lee	C. S. Lee	C. S. Lee	C. S. Lee	C. S. Lee	C. S. Lee	C. S. Lee	C. S. Lee		Alex Shimizu	C. S. Lee	TBA
Joey Quinn			Desmond Harrington	Desmond Harrington	Desmond Harrington	Desmond Harrington	Desmond Harrington	Desmond Harrington			Desmond Harrington	Desmond Harrington
Jamie Batista						Aimee Garcia	Aimee Garcia	Aimee Garcia				
Tom Matthews	Geoff Pierson	Geoff Pierson		Geoff Pierson	Geoff Pierson	Geoff Pierson	Geoff Pierson	Geoff Pierson				
Harrison Morgan			Various (Note: Portrayed by various actors in a recurring capacity before New Blood, including Brandon Michael Bass, Luke and Evan Kruntchev, Jadon Wells, and various uncredited babies.)	Various	Various	Various	Various	Various	Jack Alcott		Jack Alcott	Jack Alcott
Angela Bishop									Julia Jones			
Audrey Bishop									Johnny Sequoyah			
Logan									Alano Miller			
Kurt Caldwell									Clancy Brown			
Bobby Watt										Reno Wilson		
Aaron Spencer										Patrick Dempsey		
Charlotte "Charley" Brown											Uma Thurman	Uma Thurman
Blessing Kamara											Ntare Mwine	Ntare Mwine
Claudette Wallace											Kadia Saraf	Kadia Saraf
Melvin Oliva											Dominic Fumusa	Dominic Fumusa
Elsa Rivera											Emilia Suárez	
Leon Prater											Peter Dinklage	
Don Framt											Voice (Note: Voiced by an uncredited voice actor in "Course Correction".)	Brian Cox
Lucas Stark												Dan Stevens
Captain Mixon												Bokeem Woodbine
Fiona Mixon												Nona Parker Johnson

=== Recurring cast ===
= Recurring cast (3+)
= Guest cast (1-2)
= Co-Starring

Character	Dexter seasons								New Blood	Original Sin	Resurrection	
Character	1	2	3	4	5	6	7	8	New Blood	Original Sin	1	2
Astor Bennett	Christina Robinson	Christina Robinson	Christina Robinson	Christina Robinson	Christina Robinson		Christina Robinson					
Cody Bennett	Daniel Goldman	Preston Bailey	Preston Bailey	Preston Bailey	Preston Bailey		Preston Bailey					
Brian Moser	Christian Camargo	Christian Camargo				Christian Camargo				Roby Attal	Christian Camargo	TBA
Brian Moser										Xander Mateo		
Paul Bennett	Mark Pellegrino	Mark Pellegrino										
Laura Moser	Sage Kirkpatrick	Sage Kirkpatrick	Sage Kirkpatrick							Brittany Allen		
Esmee Pascal	Judith Scott	Judith Scott										
Frank Lundy		Keith Carradine		Keith Carradine								
Gabriel Bosque		Dave Baez										
Lila West		Jaime Murray										
Gail Brandon		JoBeth Williams										
Miguel Prado			Jimmy Smits							Nick Santucci (Note: Cameo appearance)	Jimmy Smits	
Anton Briggs			David Ramsey	David Ramsey								
Yuki Amado			Liza Lapira									
Ramón Prado			Jason Manuel Olazabal									
Syl Prado			Valerie Cruz					Valerie Cruz				
Ellen Wolf			Anne Ramsay									
George King			Jesse Borrego									
Barbara Gianna			Kristin Dattilo									
Arthur Mitchell				John Lithgow					John Lithgow		John Lithgow	
Christine Hill				Courtney Ford								
Elliot Larson				Rick Peters	Rick Peters							
Sally Mitchell				Julia Campbell								
Jonah Mitchell				Brando Eaton	Brando Eaton	Brando Eaton						
Rebecca Mitchell				Vanessa Marano		Vanessa Marano						
Maura Bennett					Kathleen Noone							
Bill Bennett					Steve Eastin							
Cira Manzon					April Hernandez							
Jordan Chase					Jonny Lee Miller							
Lumen Pierce					Julia Stiles							
Sonya					Maria Doyle Kennedy							
Stan Liddy					Peter Weller							
Travis Marshall						Colin Hanks						
James Gellar						Edward James Olmos						
Ryan Chambers						Brea Grant						
Brother Sam						Mos Def						
Mike Anderson						Billy Brown	Billy Brown					
Louis Greene						Josh Cooke	Josh Cooke					
Isaak Sirko							Ray Stevenson					
George Novikov							Jason Gedrick					
Nadia							Katia Winter					
Hannah McKay							Yvonne Strahovski	Yvonne Strahovski				
Evelyn Vogel								Charlotte Rampling				
Jacob Elway								Sean Patrick Flanery				
Zach Hamilton								Sam Underwood				
Daniel Vogel / Oliver Saxon								Darri Ingolfsson				
Max Clayton								Kenny Johnson				
Matt Caldwell									Steve M. Robertson			
Edward Olsen									Fredric Lehne			
Teddy Reed									David Magidoff		David Magidoff	
Esther									Katy Sullivan			
Fred Jr.									Michael Cyril Creighton			
Tess									Gizel Jiménez			
Abraham Brown									Gregory Cruz			
Molly Park									Jamie Chung			Jamie Chung (Note: Voice only; in "Live Free and Die".)
Elric									Shuler Hensley			
Tanya Martin										Sarah Michelle Gellar		
Camilla Figg	Margo Martindale	Margo Martindale	Margo Martindale							Sarah Kinsey		
Doris Morgan	Kathrin Lautner Middleton	Kathrin Lautner Middleton					Kathrin Lautner Middleton			Jasper Lewis		
Sofia Rivera										Raquel Justice		
Clark Sanders										Aaron Jennings		
Tony Ferrer										Roberto Sanchez		
Hector Estrada										Carlo Mendez		
Santos Jimenez										Randy Gonzalez		
Mad Dog										Joe Pantoliano		
Gio										Isaac Gonzalez Rossi		
Becca Spencer										Amanda Brooks		
Nicky Spencer										London Thatcher		
Stefan Pike											Jason Alan Carvell	TBA
Lance Thomas											Darius Jordan Lee	TBA
Constance Kamara											JillMarie Lawrence	TBA
Joy Kamara											Reese Antoinette	TBA
Al Walker											Eric Stonestreet	Eric Stonestreet
Mia LaPierre											Krysten Ritter	Krysten Ritter
Gigi Jones											Emily Kimball	TBA
Gemini Killers (Gareth)											David Dastmalchian	
Ronald "Red" Schmidt											Marc Menchaca	
Ryan Foster											Bryan Lillis	
Prudence Kamara											Sharon Hope	
Dante Rivera											Liam Delgad	TBA
Shauna											McKaley Miller	
Mildred Brown											Kit Flanagan	TBA
Eric Tabach											Emily Kimball	TBA

== Main characters ==
=== Introduced in the main series ===
==== Dexter Morgan ====
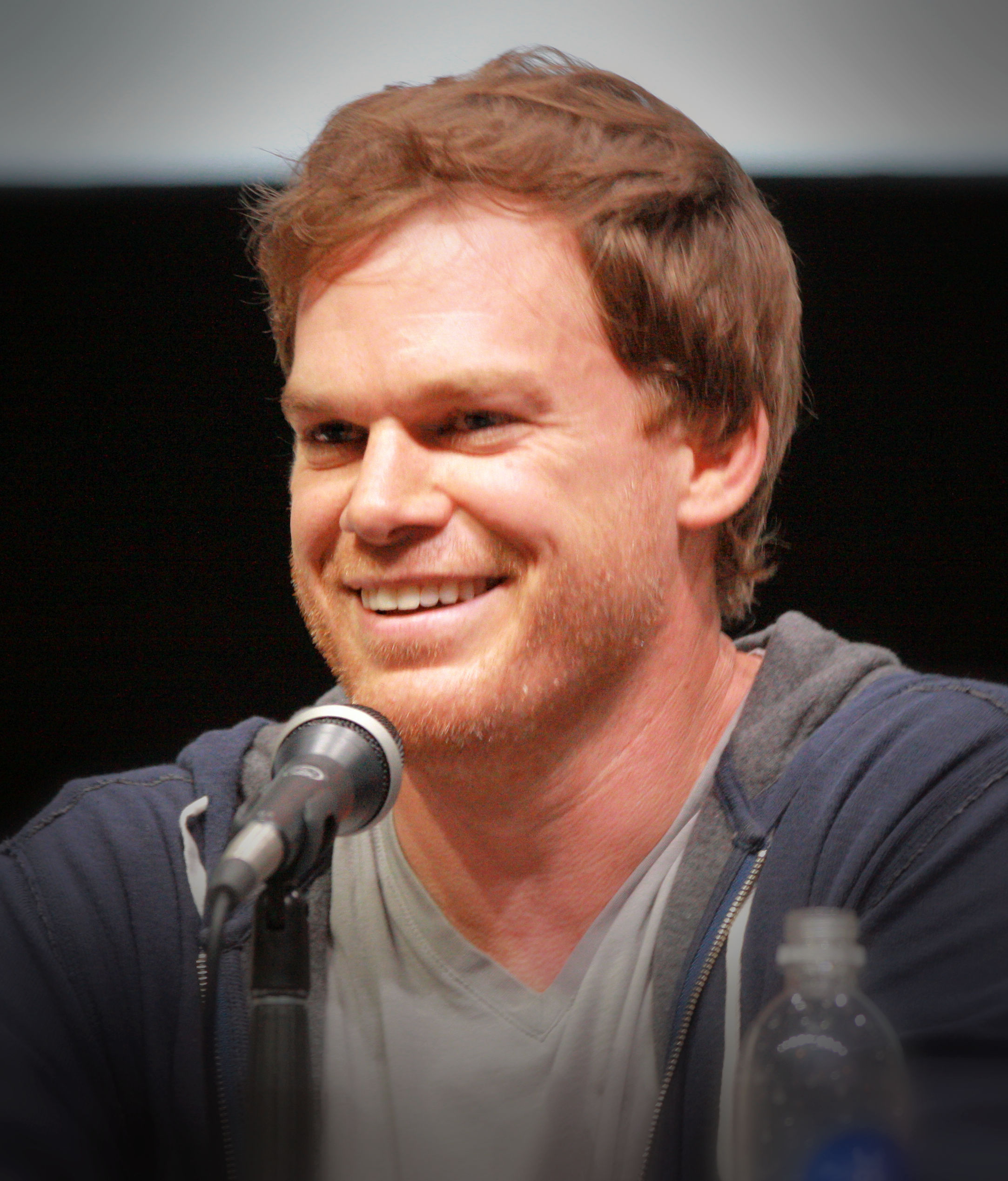
Michael C. Hall

- Dominic Janes (preteen Dexter)
- Devon Graye (teenage Dexter)
- Patrick Gibson (Original Sin)

Dexter considers himself emotionally divorced from the rest of humanity; in his narration, he often refers to "humans" as if he is not one of them. He makes frequent references to an internal feeling of emptiness, leading to several attempts in his youth to "feel alive". He claims to have no feelings or conscience and that all of his emotional responses are part of a well-rehearsed act to conceal his true nature. In the beginning of season 1 of the television series, he has no interest in romance or sex; this changes after his psychological breakthrough with Emmett Meridian. He initially considers his relationship with Rita to be part of his disguise; however, by the end of season 4, Dexter has fully evolved into a family man and wishes to rid himself of his self-titled "Dark Passenger".

After his wife, Rita's, death in the season 4 finale, however, he is shocked, growing worse in multiple ways. He becomes emotionally paralyzed and breaks the code on multiple occasions.

There are chinks in Dexter's emotional armor; he acknowledges loyalty to family, particularly his now-deceased, adoptive father, stating "If I were capable of love, how I would have loved Harry". Since Harry's death, Dexter's only family has been his sister, Debra Morgan, Harry's biological daughter. At the end of the first novel, Dexter admits that he could not hurt Debra or allow Brian to harm her because he is "fond of her."

Dexter likes children; the flip side of this affection is that Dexter is particularly wrathful when his victims prey on children. In the book Dearly Devoted Dexter, Dexter realizes that Rita's son Cody is showing the same signs of sociopathy as Dexter had at that age, and looked forward to providing him with "guidance" similar to that which Harry provided him. Cody's perceived sociopathy is not present in the television series.

This also gives him a reason to continue his relationship with Rita, to whom (as of Dearly Devoted Dexter) he is engaged because of a misunderstanding. At the beginning of the third book, Dexter in the Dark, it is revealed that Cody is not the only one with dark impulses, as Astor too pressures Dexter to teach her, and Dexter comes to accept his role as a stepfather to both children seriously; for example, while on a stakeout, he begins to wonder if Cody has brushed his teeth before going to bed and if Astor had set out her Easter dress for photo-day at her school. These thoughts distract him while he is waiting for an intended victim, which thoroughly annoys him. In the TV series, Dexter also takes a detour in his code of only killing murderers in order to dispose of a pedophile who is stalking Astor.

Animals do not like Dexter, which can cause noise problems when Dexter stalks a victim with pets. He is quoted as having once had a dog that barked and growled at Dexter until he was forced to get rid of it, and a turtle, which hid in its shell until it died of starvation rather than have to deal with Dexter.

==== Rita Bennett ====
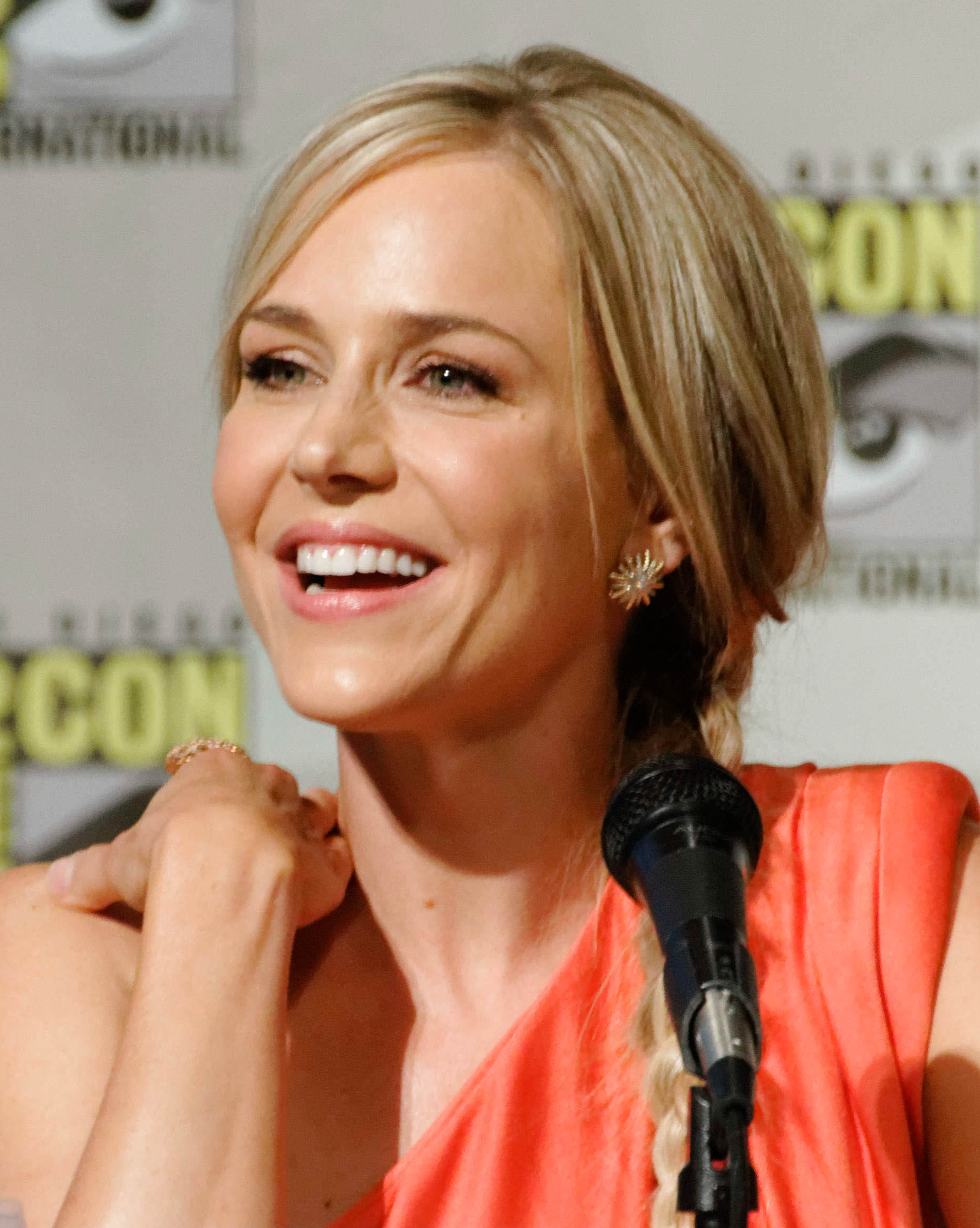
Julie Benz

- Julie Benz (seasons 1–4; guest season 5)

Rita Bennett is Dexter's girlfriend and later wife. Rita is portrayed as a mother, who is slowly recovering from being physically abused by her ex-husband, Paul, and having difficulties maintaining a sexual relationship. Rita tentatively starts a relationship with Dexter, while remaining unaware of his criminal activities. In season two, Rita's relationship with Dexter becomes troubled. After discovering that Dexter framed her ex-husband Paul with drug abuse, she suspects that Dexter owned the drugs himself. She pushes him into Narcotics Anonymous, but begins to suspect that he is having an affair with his sponsor, Lila, and breaks up with him. In anguish, Dexter turns to Lila, and consummates what had before been a platonic relationship. After Dexter lies to Lila about working late (he had gone to kill Jimenez), Lila breaks into Rita's house, afraid that they had rekindled their relationship. Angered, Dexter breaks up with her. His breakup with Lila, his love for Rita and her children, and his sincere regret over what he had done convinces Rita to start dating him again.

In season 3, Rita suddenly discovers that she is pregnant with Dexter's baby. Believing that being a parent is one of her main achievements, Rita decides to keep the baby, and leaves Dexter's role in the child's life entirely up to him. After much deliberation, Dexter decides (with Debra's help) that he will be there for the child and Rita accepts his marriage proposal. Rita loses her job when she is rude to a customer, but gets back on her feet by working as an assistant to Syl Prado.

After the baby, Harrison, is born, Rita and Dexter move into a house together in the suburbs. Rita begins to notice a pattern of lies from Dexter, including deceiving her about the concussion he suffered in the car accident and the ownership of his old apartment. Rita and Dexter then go to a marriage counselor, who allows them to resolve their problems and instigates peace between them. However, their neighbor, Elliot, begins to fall for Rita, kissing her and pointing out that Dexter is never home. Though she kisses him back, she ends it before something begins.

In the ending of season 4, "The Getaway", Rita is found killed by the Trinity Killer in her own bathtub, with Harrison crying on the blood-soaked floor. Dexter is devastated by this, but later in the series, Harrison does not appear to be seriously traumatized.

==== Debra Morgan ====
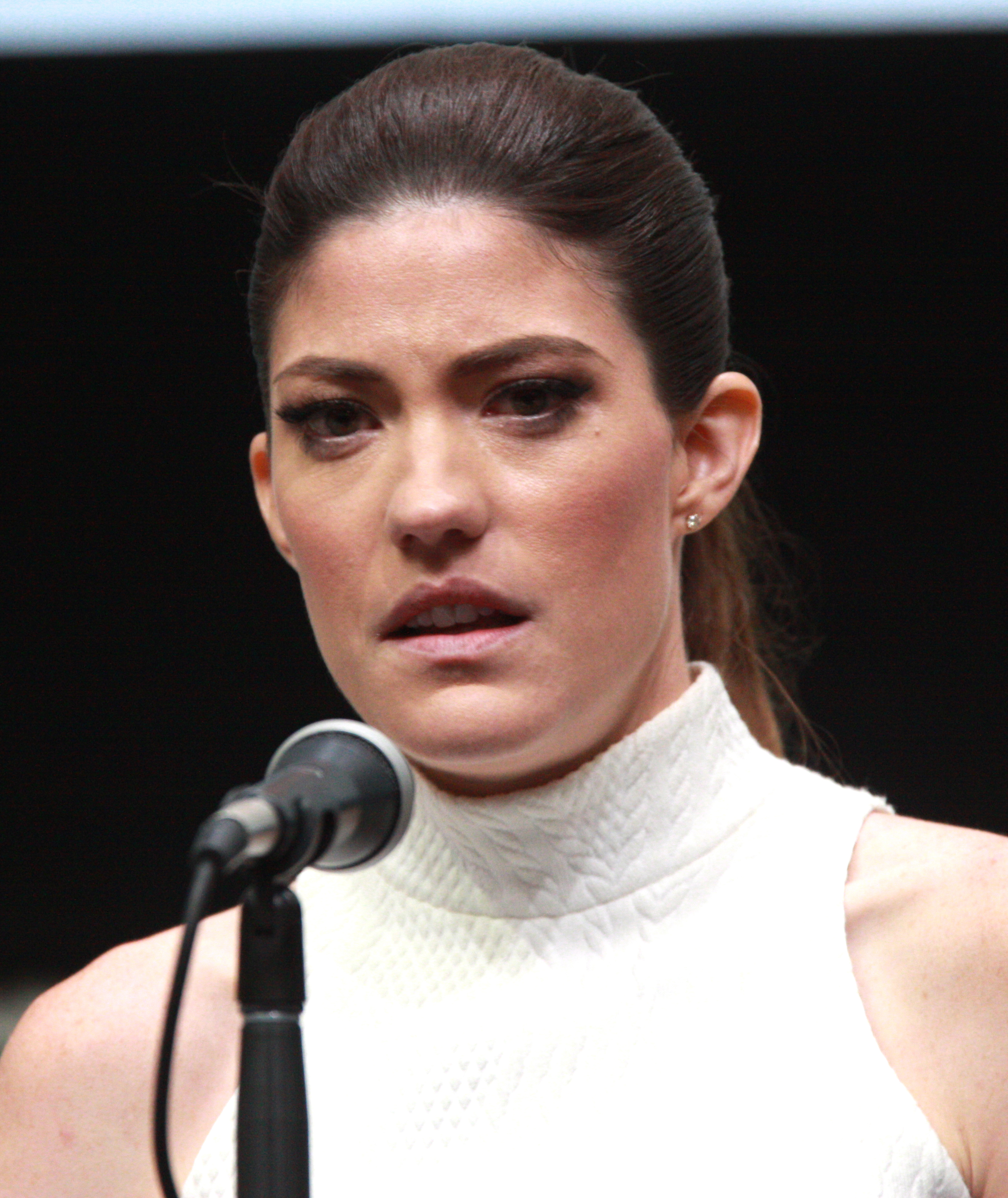
Jennifer Carpenter

- Jennifer Carpenter
- Haley King (teenage Debra)
- Laura Marano (young Debra)
- Molly Brown (Original Sin)

Debra Morgan (known as Deborah Morgan in the books) is the younger non-biological sister of Dexter and biological child of Harry Morgan. Debra believed that she truly knew her father, but is unaware of the secrets he kept, especially concerning Dexter (whom she sees as a true brother). Inspired by their father's legendary police career, Debra joined the police and desperately yearned to become a homicide detective. Initially assigned to Vice, she was transferred to Homicide at the start of the first season. Being new to the job and insecure, she largely relied on Dexter's expertise on murderers to solve difficult cases. Debra met Rudy Cooper, who unbeknownst to her, is the Ice Truck Killer using her to get close to Dexter. She falls in love with him, but is later kidnapped by him in order to be able to reveal himself to Dexter. She is bound to a table in the same manner that Dexter kills his victims, while Dexter and Brian discuss her fate. In the show, she is unconscious, but in Darkly Dreaming Dexter, she is awake and discovers that her brother is a killer. Debra is severely affected by Rudy's betrayal; she moves in with Dexter for fear of being alone.

Throughout the second season, Debra stays in her brother's apartment as she deals with the trauma of what happened, but leaves it in a mess. Debra is a key member of the police task force in charge of finding the Bay Harbor Butcher, who is secretly Dexter. She falls for an older man, Frank Lundy, the FBI agent in charge of the case, all the while improving her ability on the job. By the end of season 2, Debra has recovered from the trauma of the Ice Truck Killer, and is confident as an officer and determined to get her detective's shield.

In season 3, Debra has had her hair cut to shoulder length, has "sworn off men, liquor and smokes" and is even more determined to get her silver detective's shield. She is working with a new partner, Detective Quinn, but has been approached by an Internal Affairs officer who tells her that her partner is being investigated as a dirty cop, but she refuses to help them. She is originally part of the team investigating the murder of Miguel Prado's brother, Oscar, but because of her lack of tact and people skills, she is removed from the case by newly promoted Angel Batista; however, the case she has been assigned (the murder of a young woman) is eventually found to have been connected to the Skinner case, which she solves with the help of Anton, a C.I. whom she starts dating after saving his life from the Skinner. Because of her success on the Skinner case, she is promoted to detective at the end of the season.

She is known to have a foul mouth, and she hardly speaks a sentence without swearing. This has nearly gotten her into trouble, as she often speaks profanely to her superiors, only to realize a few seconds after. It finally gets her into trouble in the third season, as a poorly timed public comment causes her to be kicked off the Freebo case. She is also known for being easily angered and frustrated by suspects. Though she is also frustrated at Dexter's inability to open up to her, she has defended him on more than one occasion.

A conversation between her and Dexter leads to her discover that her father slept with one of his confidential informants. She investigates the files on Harry's informants and interviews some of them, hoping to find the one with whom Harry had an affair. One of the files is shown to be that of Laura Moser. Also during this time, her relationship with Anton has been breaking, especially now that he has secured a gig in the city instead of on a cruise ship. Also, Frank Lundy returns to Miami to hunt the Trinity Killer, and Debra once again becomes involved with Lundy. Soon, both she and Lundy are shot by an unknown assailant suspected to be the Vacation Murderers. In her hospital bed, she confesses to Anton that she slept with Lundy, prompting him to leave her. Lundy dies, and she eventually concludes that the Trinity Killer must have been the shooter. As a result, Debra opens an investigation on the Trinity Killer. However, it is later determined that Trinity could not have been the shooter, since her wounds from the bullet were at a horizontal line, therefore someone of Masuka's height had to be the shooter. During a Thanksgiving dinner, Debra remembers a conversation she had with Christine Hill and realizes Hill has knowledge of the shooting that no one outside the police department should possess. This leads Debra to believe that she was the shooter. This is backed up later when it is revealed that Hill is the daughter of Trinity. Hill later confesses to Debra that she was the shooter, and proceeds to shoot herself in the head. Due to her solving the Lundy killing, Debra restarts her search for Harry's C.I. mistress, and learns the truth about Laura Moser, and the fact that Dexter and the Ice Truck Killer were brothers.

In the revival series, Dexter: New Blood, Debra, while still dead, has replaced Harry in Dexter's mind as his "Dark Passenger".

==== James Doakes ====
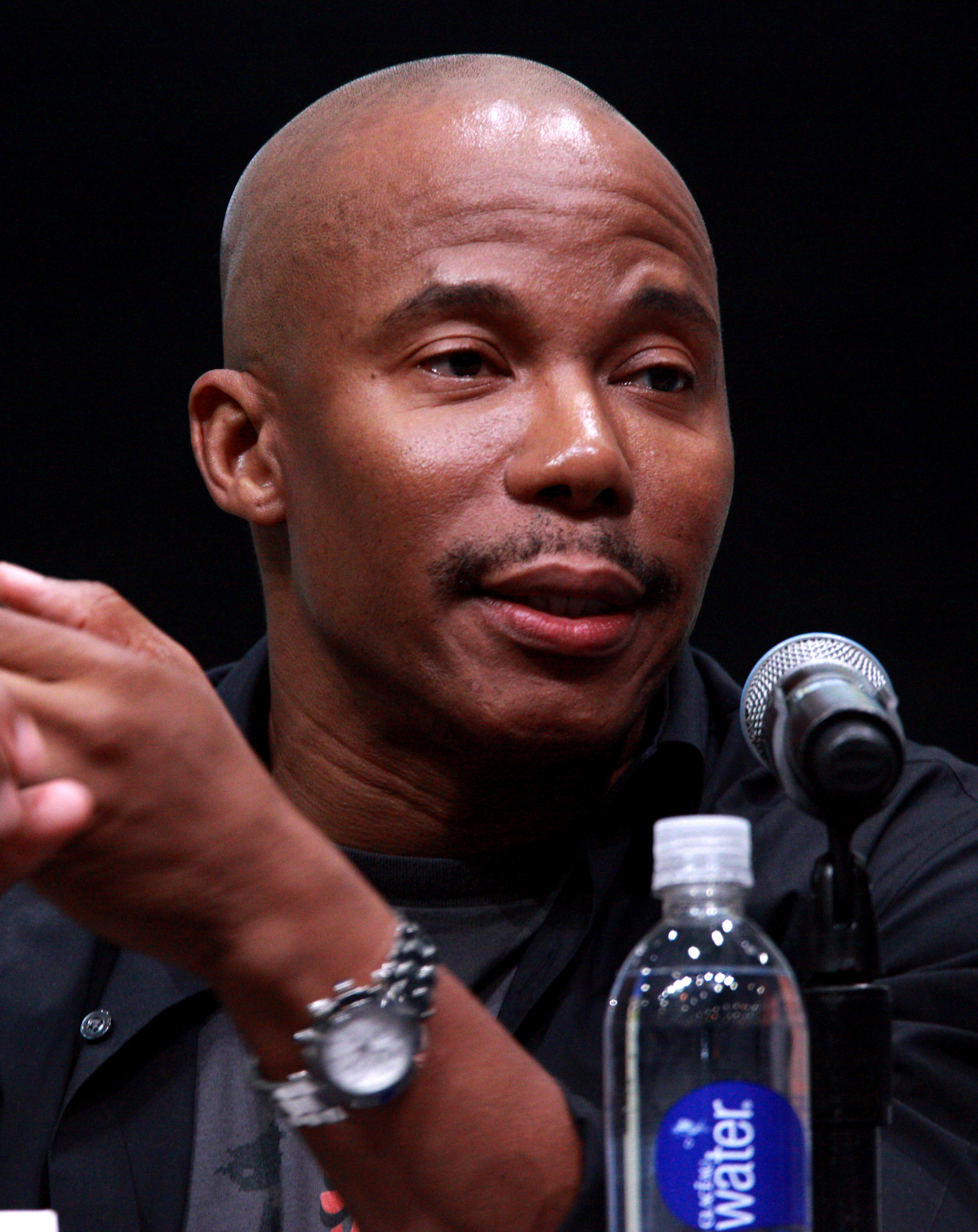
Erik King

- Erik King (seasons 1–2; guest season 7 and Resurrection)

James Doakes is a sergeant serving as lead case investigator to Miami Metro PD's Homicide. Doakes had killer impulses which drove him to divorce his wife, confessing that if he had stayed with her any longer, he would have killed her.

Doakes instinctively hates Dexter and is the only person in Dexter's life who can see through his false persona of normalcy. Doakes suspects that Dexter is hiding a dark secret and has no reservations about cursing him to his face. Ultimately, Doakes realizes that Dexter is withholding vital information on the Ice Truck Killer case and his frustration drives Doakes to physically attack him, only for Dexter to expertly fight back. Doakes' friend LaGuerta tells him to back off, but Doakes begins stalking Dexter in secret.

Doakes temporarily ends his illicit pursuit when he finds Dexter at a Narcotics Anonymous meeting, supposedly for heroin addiction. Doakes erroneously believes Dexter's dark secret is that he is a drug addict whose addiction is caused by work-related stress, Doakes tells Dexter that he has seen many police officers led down the same path. Feeling sympathetic towards Dexter, Doakes briefly leaves him alone.

Doakes resumes the hunt when Debra innocently reveals that Dexter does not so much as smoke. On finding Doakes meddling in his past again, Dexter goads him into a seemingly unprovoked fight in front of the entire squad room. Doakes breaks into Dexter's apartment, and stumbles upon Dexter's blood slide collection box, and realizes that Dexter could be the Bay Harbor Butcher. He steals the slides to have them analyzed. Ironically, Doakes is by now the prime suspect in the case, thanks to Dexter's manipulation of the evidence.

Doakes attempts to apprehend Dexter himself in the Everglades, but Dexter gets the upper hand and locks him in Jimenez's cabin while deciding what to do next. Doakes tries to convince Dexter to turn himself in. Lila Tournay finds the cabin and blows it up by igniting propane tanks after discovering that Dexter is the Bay Harbor Butcher. Doakes' incinerated remains are found along with the dismembered body of Jose Garza, and so the case is closed, with the official conclusion that Doakes was the serial killer.

==== María LaGuerta ====
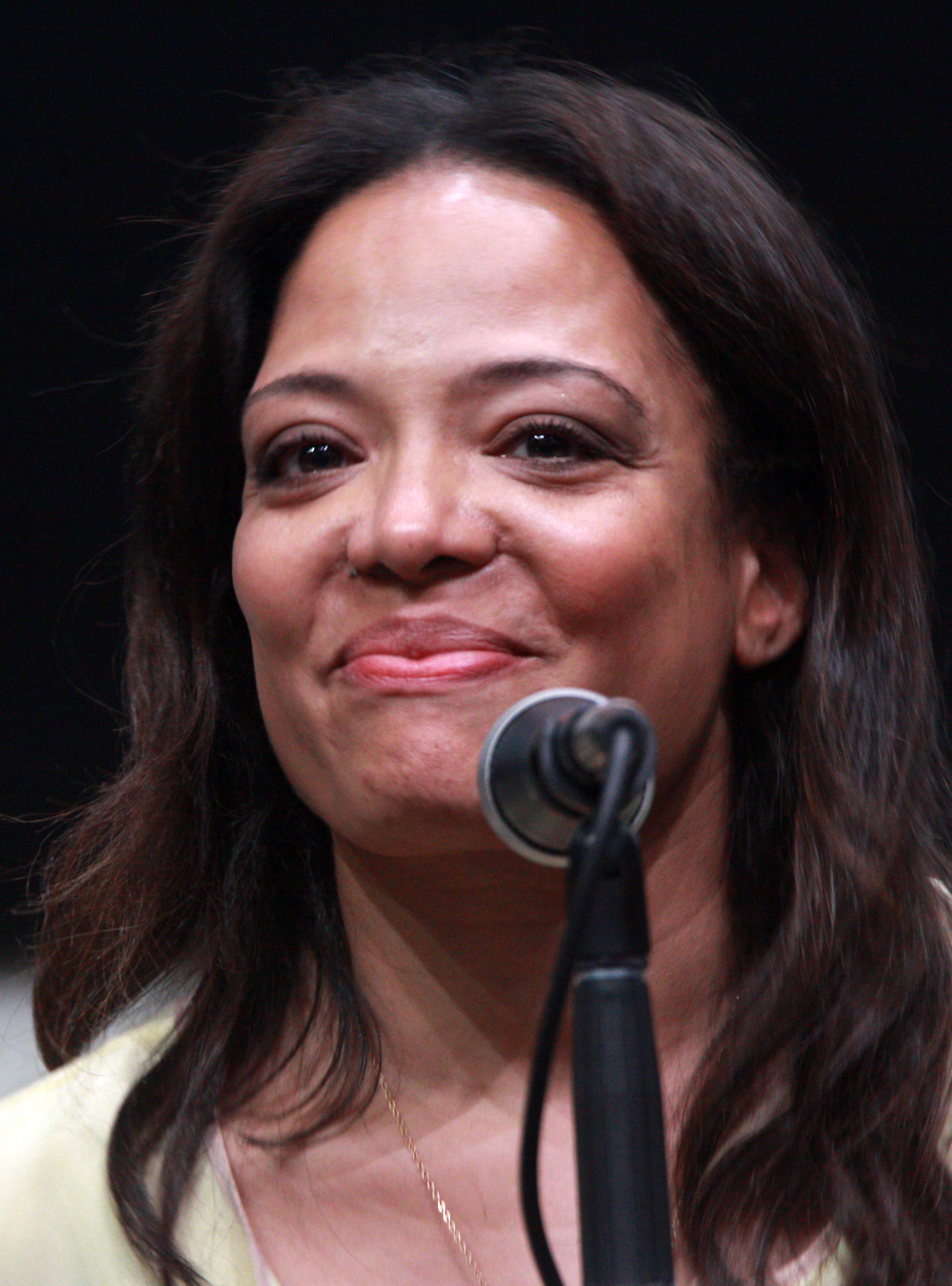
Lauren Vélez

- Lauren Vélez (seasons 1–7)
- Christina Milian (Original Sin)

María LaGuerta is the lieutenant of the Homicide division. She is described as a "climber", being able to leverage her way into better positions, and has a talent for talking to the press. At one point, she marries Angel, but divorces for the sake of her career.

In season 7, after she finds a blood slide at a crime scene, LaGuerta investigates Dexter, trying to prove he is the Bay Harbor Butcher. In the season finale, when LaGuerta is in a shipping container with Dexter, she is shot and killed by Debra Morgan.

==== Angel Batista ====
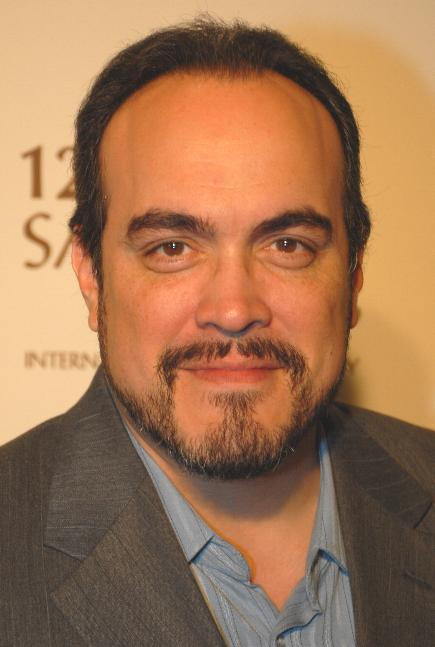
David Zayas

- David Zayas (seasons 1–8; Resurrection; guest New Blood)
- James Martinez (Original Sin)

Angelo Batista, almost always called 'Angel', is a detective in Miami Metro Police Department's Homicide Division. Batista is religious and good-natured, with a dry sense of humor. He is also totally honest, at the request of his father on his deathbed, as well as Dexter's best friend. Angel is shown wearing a trilby hat most of the time. He has an ex-wife and a daughter, Nina. In season 3, he is promoted to sergeant. He marries LaGuerta in season 4, and they divorce after season 5. In season 7, he buys and begins to manage a restaurant. Despite having announced his retirement, in season 8 he still works for the police, having been promoted to lieutenant.

In Dexter: New Blood, Batista discovers from Angela Bishop that Dexter is still alive.

In Dexter: Original Sin, he is a detective at Miami Metro Homicide who begins to befriend Dexter. Angel inadvertently inspires him to target Tony Ferrer, a loan shark who killed a waiter at a bar the police frequents.

In Dexter: Resurrection, Batista sets off to investigate Dexter, correctly believing that Dexter is the Bay Harbor Butcher. Retiring from his position in the homicide department, he temporarily moves to New York City to prove Dexter's crimes. Angel is eventually caught and killed by Prater, and dies cursing Dexter Morgan.

==== Harry Morgan ====
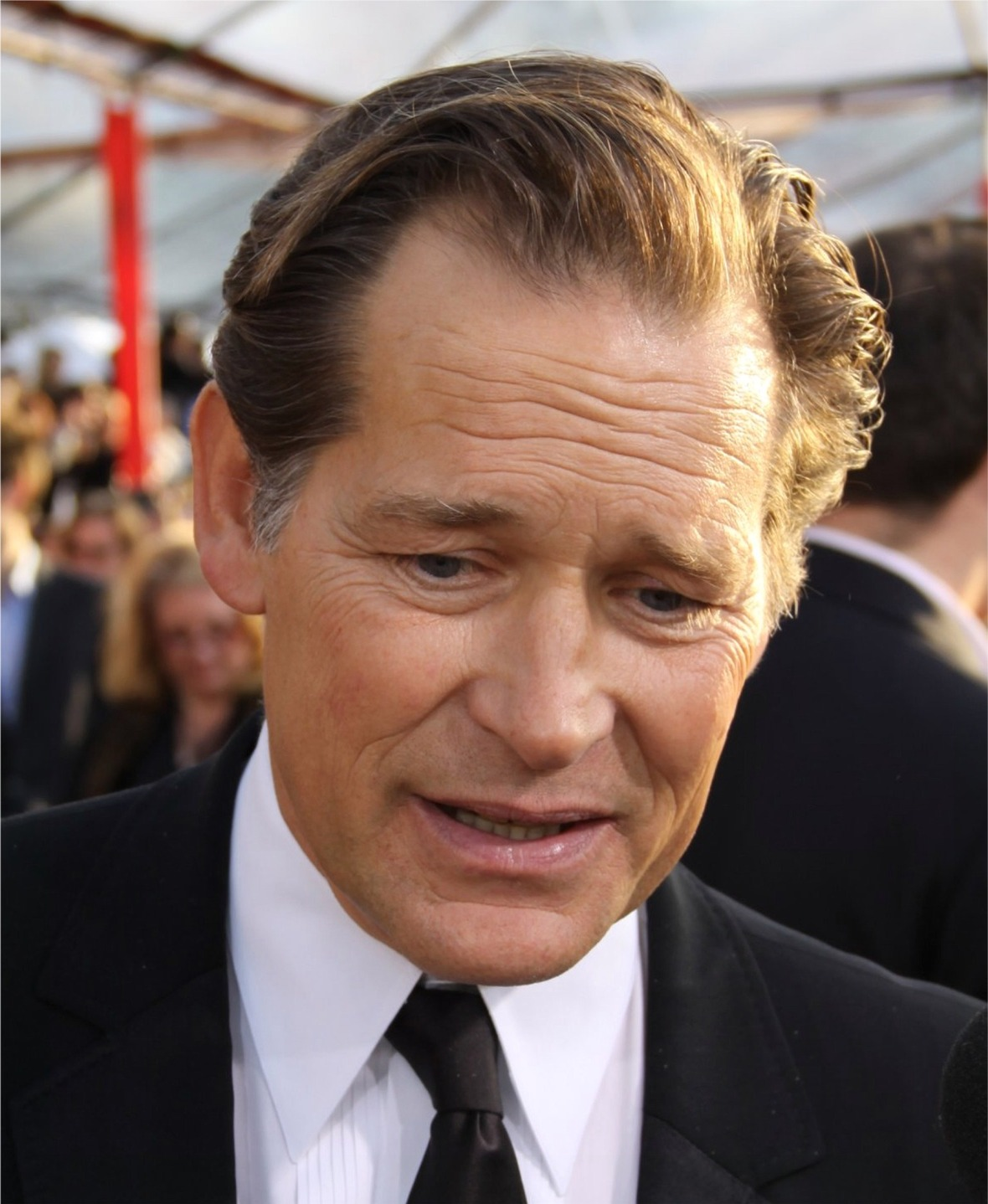
James Remar

- James Remar (seasons 1–8, Resurrection)
- Christian Slater (Original Sin)

Harry Morgan is Dexter's adoptive father. When alive, he was a homicide detective and highly respected member of the Miami Police Department. In the course of a high-stakes drug case, Harry began an illicit relationship with Laura Moser, Dexter's biological mother, to gather information and evidence on the drug lords in question. Laura was discovered and made an example of; she and three others were executed with chainsaws in a shipping container. Her sons, Brian and Dexter, were left in the container for two days until Harry and a police team recovered them. Harry adopted Dexter, while Brian was institutionalized.

At first, Harry attempted to manage Dexter's violent urges by only allowing him to kill animals, but he eventually came to the conclusion that Dexter's pathology could not be repressed, only controlled: Harry decided to train the boy as a vigilante, to hunt and kill murderers without leaving any clues. Dexter prized these lessons as a means to fulfill his desires with his father's approval, dubbing them the "Code of Harry". Harry's relationship with his biological daughter Debra, meanwhile, was more complicated. She craved her father's approval, and felt that he favored Dexter.

When Dexter was 19, Harry fell seriously ill and gave Dexter "permission" to kill Mary, one of his nurses, who was intentionally poisoning him with morphine. (Note: The prequel series, Dexter: Original Sin, retroactively changed the poison to potassium nitrate.) A year later when Juan Ryness, a pimp murdering prostitutes, was released due to a faulty search warrant, Harry lost his temper and told Dexter he was right in training him. When Dexter killed Ryness, Harry was horrified by the way Dexter proudly showed him the pimp's dismembered body. Harry killed himself a few days later, by overdosing on his medication.

In the series, Harry serves as Dexter's moral compass, often reminding him of what the human thing to do is, or how to proceed in whichever problem Dexter is facing. Harry has conversations with Dexter, with the son mentioning that Harry is a ghost, and sometimes even getting annoyed at his father.

In Dexter: Original Sin, Harry is alive and assumes the role of Dexter's mentor while also working at Miami Metro as a sergeant. It is revealed that he had a son that he only called 'Junior', who drowned in their swimming pool due to Harry's negligence. With LaGuerta, he works a series of murders by Brian Moser, culminating in a confrontation between Harry and Brian in which the latter knocks the former out and escapes.

Between the original series and the prequel, most facts about Harry Morgan remain the same, but a few differences arise: he falls ill when Dexter is 20 instead of 19, and is poisoned with potassium nitrate instead of morphine.

In Dexter: Resurrection, Harry reappears as Dexter's mentor, similarly to his role in the original series.

==== Vince Masuka ====
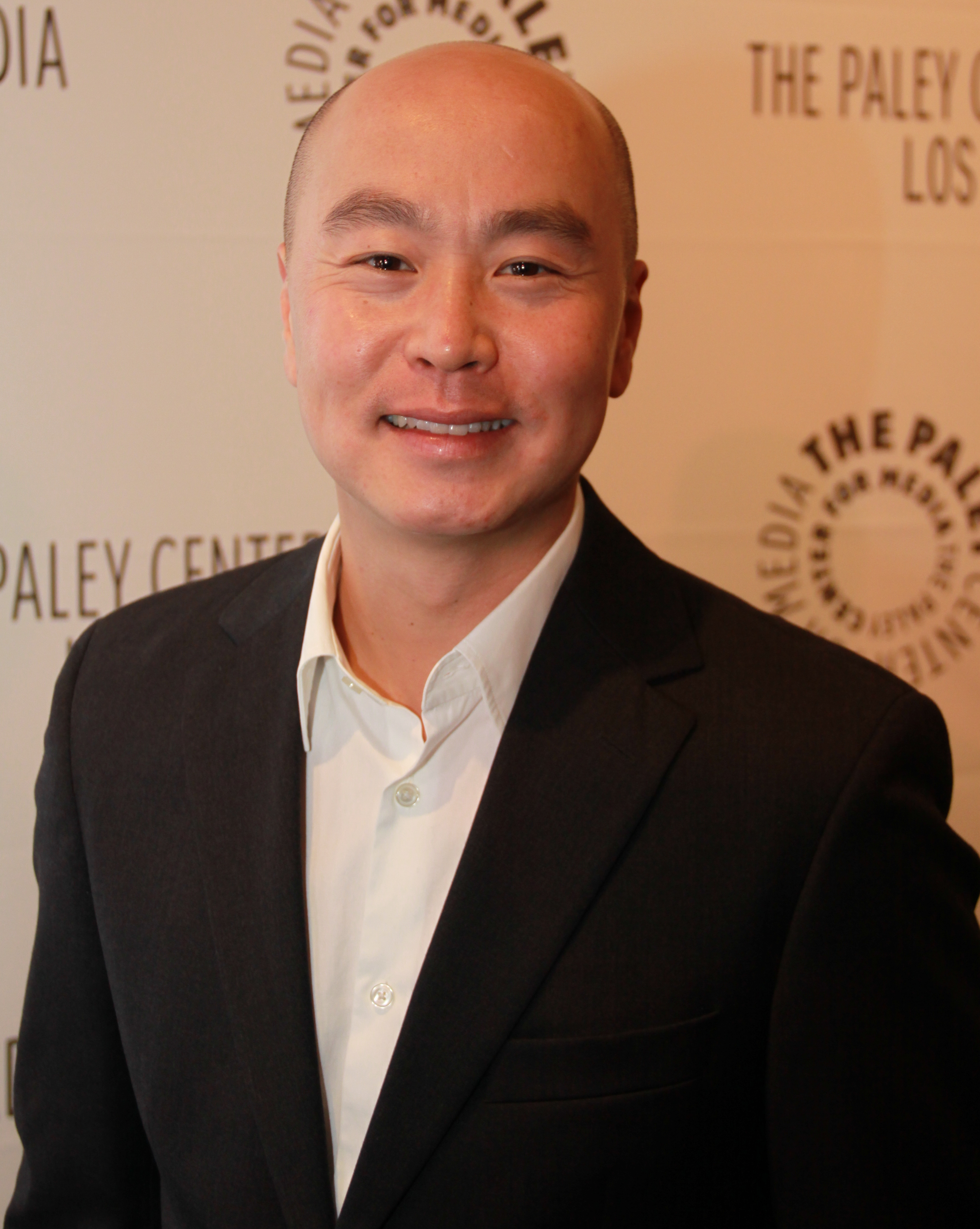
C. S. Lee

- C. S. Lee (recurring season 1; seasons 2–8; guest Resurrection)
- Alex Shimizu (Original Sin)

Vincent "Vince" Masuka is the Miami Metro Police lead forensics investigator and works alongside Dexter in the lab and at crime scenes. He often cracks jokes with explicit sexual innuendos to the rest of the team, and harbors decidedly unrequited feelings for Debra. He is portrayed as obsessed with sex, often making inappropriate comments with implied sexual meanings at crime scenes ending with his characteristic laughter. The kinkier the better - he is not shy about propositioning any woman he meets. He has been able to tone it down when the situation calls for it, such as when Angel was in hospital, as well as calming Debra down when Lundy returns. Detective Joey Quinn even confronts him about it, stating that his comments are why nobody likes to be around him, only for Vince to harshly brush him off. He seems to accept Joey's explanation when no one comes to see his speech on his newly published work, for which he cleans up his act and dresses formally, but soon returns to his former self. In the books, Dexter feels a kinship with him as, like him, he hides who he really is. In the novel as well as in the series, he sets up Dexter's bachelor party and kidnaps him to get him there (in the series, in the belief that he has been kidnapped by Ramon Prado, Dexter slugs Vince in the eye just as the latter opens the car trunk). He falls for the female party planner and they are in a relationship until the end of season 3. He is also shown to be greatly distraught after seeing Rita kiss another man, leading him to tell Dexter. In season 5, he reveals he has a giant tattoo of a dragon lady on his back.

In the novels, he is the closest thing Dexter has to a friend; Dexter senses that they are both pretending to be normal, albeit for completely different reasons. In Dearly Devoted Dexter Vince throws a large bachelor party for Dexter within a few hours of learning of his engagement, and in Dexter in the Dark takes his role as best man so seriously that he calls in favors to hire Manny Borque, a famous caterer, for Dexter's wedding.

In Dexter: Original Sin, Masuka is a forensics investigator at Miami Metro Homicide. He helps Dexter get a fake ID, presumably to acquire alcohol, when it is in fact for Dexter to procure etorphine for his victims.

Masuka briefly appears in Dexter: Resurrection while congratulating Angel Batista on his retirement from the police force.

==== Joey Quinn ====
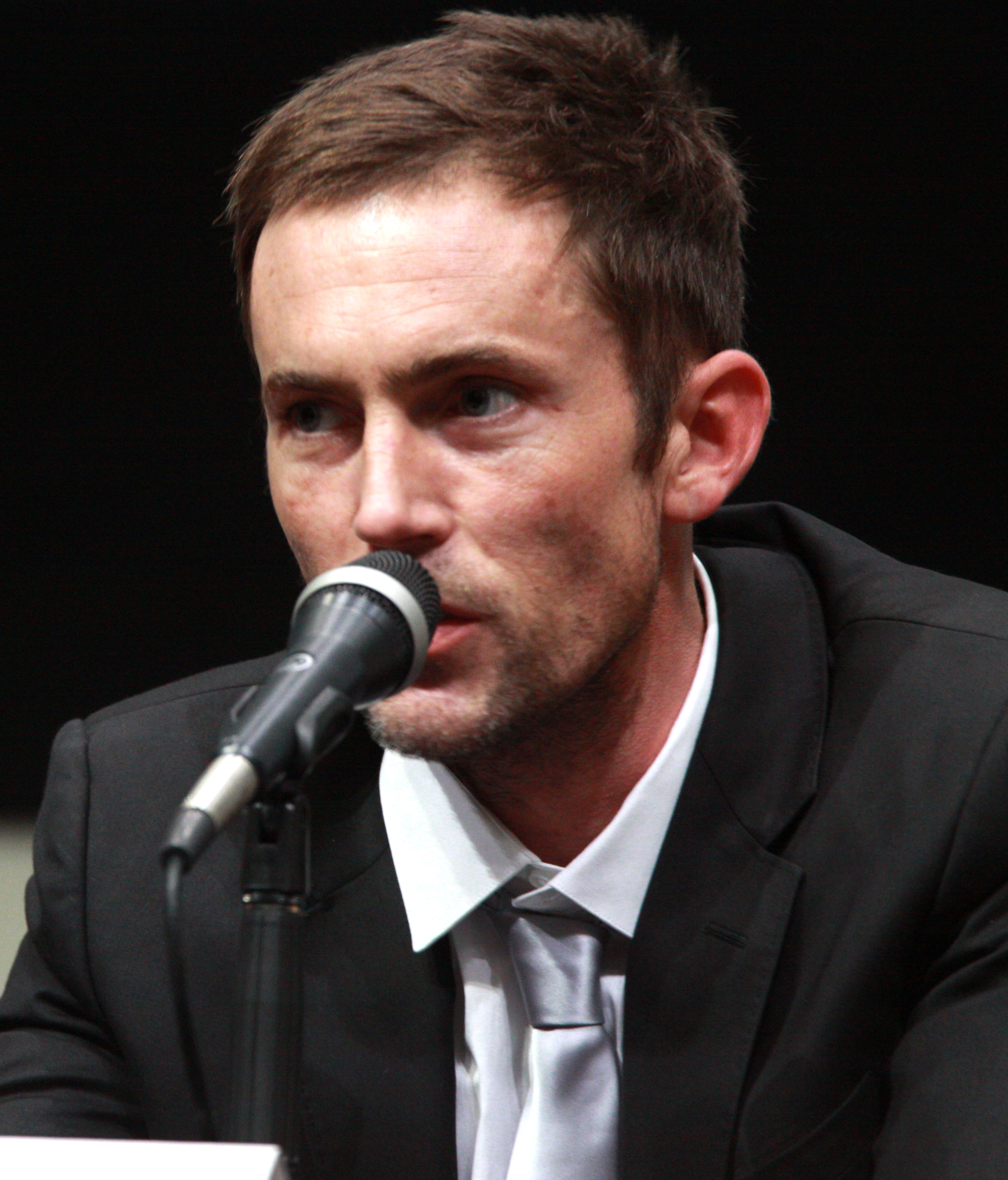
Desmond Harrington

- Desmond Harrington (seasons 4–8, recurring season 3, Resurrection)

Joseph "Joey" Quinn is a detective who transferred to the Homicide division after being in Narcotics before season 3. Quinn takes a liking to Debra Morgan, even giving her a C.I. to help with the Oscar Prado case. Quinn's past is unknown and even called into question, as Debra is pressured by Internal Affairs agent Yuki Amado to gather evidence against him. Quinn gets the Internal Affairs case dropped, and later confesses to Debra that the real source of the Internal Affairs investigation is the death of a former partner of his and Yuki's who had a crystal meth addiction. Quinn knew about the partner's addiction but tried to offer private help instead of informing his superiors. He is seen at Dexter's wedding, despite Debra's advice to Dexter against inviting him.

At the beginning of season 4, Quinn is infuriated when Dexter botches a case he worked on. Soon afterwards, Dexter sees Quinn stealing money from a crime scene, and Quinn attempts to buy Dexter's friendship with expensive football tickets, but Dexter gives them away to Masuka. Meanwhile, Quinn starts a relationship with Christine Hill, a seductive reporter who takes advantage of his access to police information. After a confidential police lead appears in one of Hill's articles, Lt. LaGuerta warns Quinn to be wary of any reporter who squeezes him for confidential information over pillow talk. Nonetheless, Quinn tells Hill about numerous police reports (supposedly "off the record"), and she uses this information to expose Frank Lundy's return to Miami. Quinn breaks up with Hill after the article about Lundy, but they soon make up. Though more careful about what he says around her, Quinn still defends Christine when Dexter tells her to leave Debra alone, as Hill claims to have wanted to do a "hero piece" on Debra. All of this leads to Quinn developing a confrontational relationship with Dexter. After Hill, revealed to be Trinity's daughter, shoots herself, he is clearly distraught.

In season 5, he strongly suspects Rita was really murdered by Dexter and not Trinity, because of subtle differences in MO and because Rita shared a kiss with the neighbor. He also believes that Dexter was the Kyle Butler that was hanging out with Arthur. He tracks down Trinity's son, hoping he can identify Dexter as Kyle, but he is stopped by the FBI and suspended by LaGuerta. Unable to continue, Quinn hires Stan Liddy to investigate Dexter. After a one-night stand with Debra, Quinn repeatedly tries to get her back into bed, eventually succeeding as the two begin to date, until Debra discovers that Quinn was suspended by LaGuerta for investigating Dexter, and not taking vacation days as he had said. Liddy begins to harass Quinn but Quinn does not wish to continue investigating Dexter because of his romantic feelings for his sister, Debra. Stan Liddy was killed by Dexter in self-defense. Quinn is the main suspect because there is blood on his shoe and numerous calls between his phone and Liddy. Dexter makes the blood evidence on Quinn's shoe go away and Quinn is once again a free man. Quinn thanks Dexter, who plays dumb and just says "For what? Just doing my job."

In season 7, Quinn falls for Nadia, a stripper who works at a club, The Fox Hole, operated by the Koshka Brotherhood, a Ukrainian mafia. He steals evidence that would have convicted Isaak Sirko in an attempt to win Nadia's freedom from Koshka control. After freeing her from her strip club job, Nadia runs away to Las Vegas, leaving Quinn brokenhearted. In the season finale, he is seen having drinks with Angel Batista's sister.

In the final season, Quinn lets Deb know of his returning feelings. They both resume the relationship; unfortunately, Deb does not survive her brutal attack. They are able to show their true feelings before the finale.

In Dexter: Resurrection, Quinn appears together with Masuka to congratulate Batista on his retirement, mentioning that he is still heartbroken after the events of season 7. He is set to return in the second season.

==== Jamie Batista ====
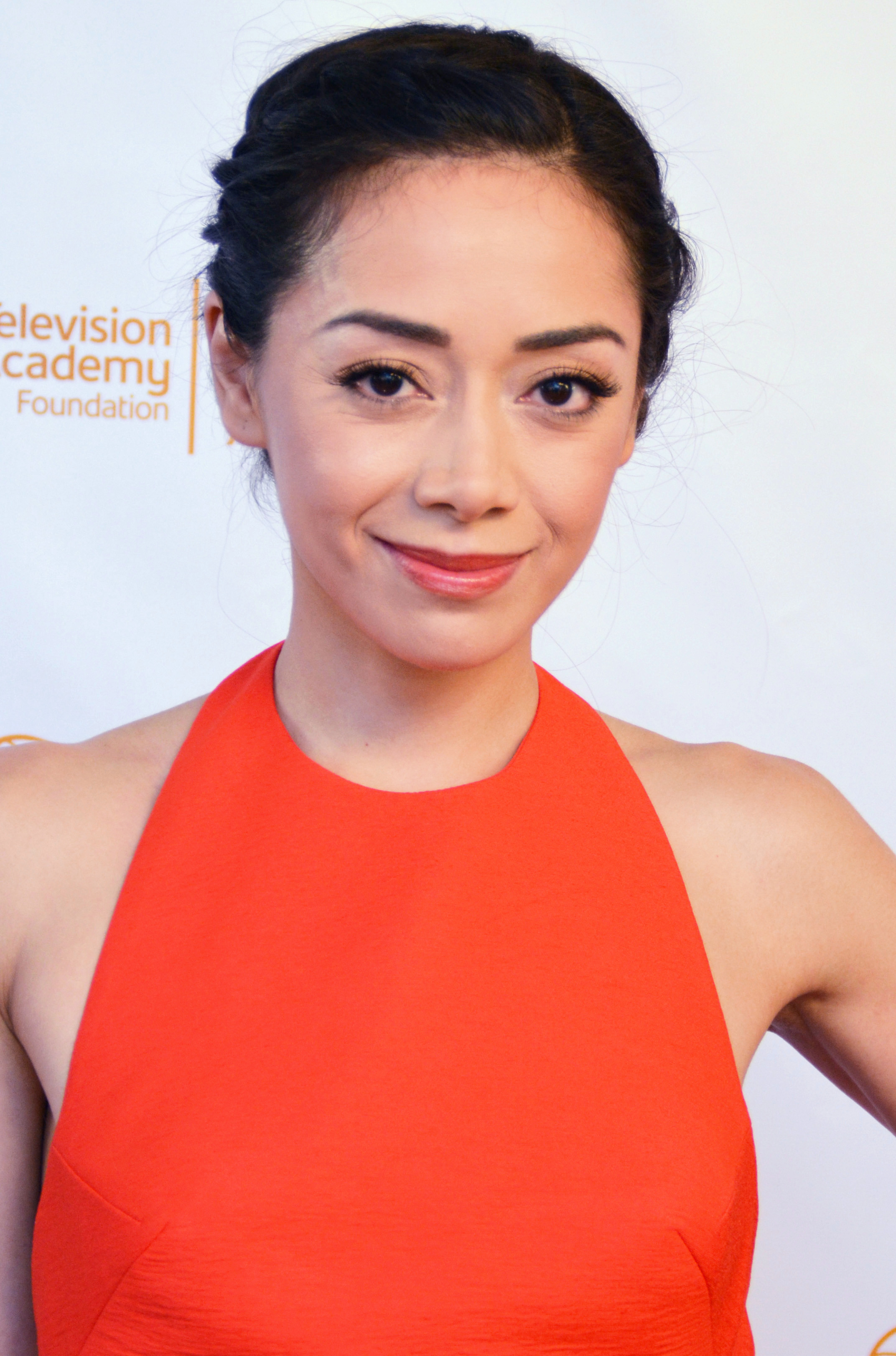
Aimee Garcia

- Aimee Garcia (season 8; recurring seasons 6–7)

Jamie Batista is Angel Batista's much-younger sister. She moves to Miami to attend graduate school, and is hired by Dexter as Harrison's nanny shortly after. Her tendency to be in scantily-clad clothing in public leads to some issues with her brother, due to their age difference. In season 6, Dexter hires Jamie as a nanny for Harrison, who quickly grows to like her. Jamie regularly works long and flexible hours for Dexter, allowing him to continue his murders.

She had begun to build a relationship with Masuka's third intern, Louis Greene, a game developer. While Jamie attempts to get Batista to accept him, he attempts to scare him away when she is away at dinner. After Dexter mails Louis' secret video of Louis with a prostitute to Jamie, she breaks up with Louis.

In season 8, she begins a relationship with Joey Quinn. Despite trying to keep it a secret, her brother Angel learns of it. Meanwhile, she attempts to set Dexter up with his neighbor Cassie, shortly before Cassie is murdered by Daniel Vogel. Jamie takes a brief break from working with Dexter, mourning the loss of her friend. Joey breaks it off with Jamie after he accepts that he has still not gotten over Debra, which infuriates Jamie.

In Dexter: Resurrection, Angel tells a teenage Harrison that Jamie has finally finished her PhD and became a middle school principal. Despite the decade that has passed and his young age when he knew her, Harrison still remembers Jamie fondly and is happy to hear how her life turned out.

==== Tom Matthews ====
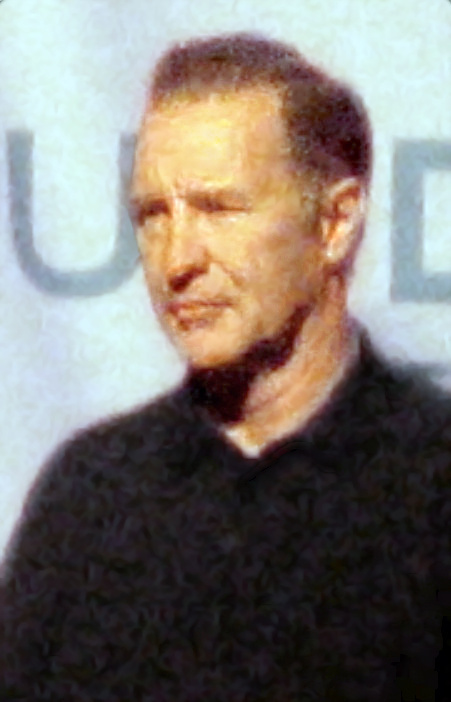
Geoff Pierson

- Geoff Pierson (season 8; recurring seasons 1–2, 4, 6–7; guest season 5)

Thomas "Tom" Matthews is a high-ranking Miami Metro PD police official who serves as its deputy chief. Previously, he served as commanding officer of Miami Metro PD Homicide Division and the immediate superior of Lieutenant María LaGuerta. Before this, he was a lieutenant himself, serving as the superior to Harry Morgan, as well as his best friend. When Harry killed himself, seemingly disillusioned from witnessing too many failures in the justice system, Matthews used his influence to bury any indication of suicide as well as kept his promise to Harry to look after Dexter and Debra.

Matthews is portrayed as having flaws: nominal racism and serious political ambition, neither of which are ever shown in the novel series.

While having originally promoted LaGuerta, he frequently clashed with her, trying to keep her focused on hunting the Ice Truck Killer correctly. He later fails to take his own advice, as when Neil Perry was mistakenly arrested and Matthews received all the praise, he went so far as to attempt to bury any evidence to the contrary. Seeing the investigation was being jeopardized LaGuerta revealed that several mistakes during the Ice Truck Killer case had been made, landing Matthews into serious possible trouble. Due to the fact that he was friends with both the police commissioner and the review board, Matthews escaped punishment and, having been personally embarrassed and wanting vengeance, Matthews laid all the blame on LaGuerta and as such gained approval to install Esmee Pascal as the new lieutenant to supervise her. This proved temporary however after having seen Esmee publicly break down over personal issues; his confidence in LaGuerta's abilities restored, Matthews promoted her back to her former position.

Matthews' latest political effort, applying for the position of deputy chief, succeeded after Matthews used the fame of successfully ending the Bay Harbor Butcher case to propel himself to that position. Matthews did not appear in season 3, but re-appeared in season 4, having succeeded in being promoted to deputy chief, personally invested in the investigation surrounding Frank Lundy's death, and Debra's shooting. After LaGuerta and Batista reveal their relationship, he initially wants to transfer Batista out of Homicide to avoid complications during a trial. Eventually, LaGuerta and Angel both agree to end their relationship to continue working in Homicide; and while accepting this, Matthews warns them that there will be serious consequences if their relationship continues. After revealing a video of LaGuerta and Batista kissing, LaGuerta confronts Tom, asking if it was because of her gender or race that he seems to have a grudge against her. Matthews simply replies he has a grudge against her because of her arrogance. In order to circumvent a reprimand from higher up, and also as a result of their deepening feelings for one another, LaGuerta and Batista secretly marry with Dexter as witness.

In the sixth-season premiere, Matthews oddly has promoted LaGuerta to captain, which many characters note as unusual. After the ceremony, it is shown that LaGuerta had found a "little black book" of a brothel with Matthews' name in it, trading the evidence for her promotion. Accordingly, her promotion left the lieutenant position open, which LaGuerta attempted to secure for Batista. Matthews declares Debra a more suitable candidate, being young and famous after a shootout at a restaurant in which Debra and Quinn were involved was recorded and posted online. LaGuerta and Batista both believe that he did this in vengeance, though little was proven. His prostitute-hiring tendencies leads to a call girl dead from a heroin overdose which, while not his fault, led to LaGuerta attempting to cover up the no-fault crime scene, claiming the low clearance rate as unacceptable. Debra continues to search after a visit from the call girl's father, leading to her discovery of Matthews' involvement. LaGuerta used the information on Tom and betrayed him and had him forcibly retired by the board when she told them. Tom believed it to be Debra who betrayed him but she stated she never would do that. Debra confronted LaGuerta for using such a low tactic, knowing full well she did it for her own personal gain. As such, LaGuerta will now take over Tom's position, possibly as Deputy Chief.

After much absence, Tom is finally brought back during LaGuerta's suspicion that Dexter is the Bay Harbor Butcher. He is seen on his boat drinking scotch, then greeting LaGuerta as she confides her suspicion that the BHB is alive and well. Tom doesn't believe her, stating the evidence was all against Doakes, but seems to show surprise after hearing a blood slide was found at Travis Marshall's church site. Though reluctant at first, Tom decides to help after discovering LaGuerta was the one who sold him out to the board and shows his anger despite LaGuerta stating he started it. He intends to help for his own reason which is to regain his 40-year pension despite LaGuerta's displeasure at the prospect.

As they dig into the case, they revisit the cabin Doakes died in and discover that Santos Jimenez had rented the cabin, prompting Tom to realize who he is. He reveals to LaGuerta that Jimenez is responsible for Dexter's mother's death and that Brian the Ice Truck Killer, is Dexter's brother. LaGuerta connects Jimenez's disappearance and Dexter's background and immediately starts to believe Dexter set Doakes up and he is the true BHB. Tom refuses to believe her and prevents LaGuerta from questioning him, stating he'll do it having known Dexter since he was a boy.

As Tom talks personally to Dexter, he confides how LaGuerta believes he is the Butcher (though Dexter is able to see that Tom also suspects it in some way). Dexter then tells him about a boat Doakes once had to lead him off the case which has Tom believe him. He tells LaGuerta about this and she doesn't believe him stating she would have known if Doakes had a boat. They find a tackle box from the old cabin with a key inside to a marina and, believing it to be Doakes's old boat spot, search the area and find several sheets of plastic, knives and one with degraded blood on it with Doakes's fingerprints on it. This causes Tom to immediately believe Dexter, but LaGuerta still believes otherwise stating Dexter could have planted it (which is actually true). Despite this, Tom tells Maria she should move on. She says she'll keep her word and give Tom his pension, and later Tom is visited by Dexter where the two make amends.

==== Harrison Morgan ====
- Brandon Michael Bass (dream version, guest season 3)
- Various uncredited infant actors (recurring season 4)
- Luke and Evan Kruntchev (recurring seasons 5–7)
- Lucas Adams (dream version, guest season 7)
- Jadon Wells (recurring season 8)
- Jack Alcott (New Blood, Resurrection)

Harrison Morgan is the son of Dexter and Rita Morgan and the half-brother of Astor and Cody. Dexter calls him a "light to his darkness". Dexter is constantly fatigued in the first part of season 4 from taking care of him, which in turn causes Dexter to make mistakes in his kill ritual. At the end of season 4, he is found by Dexter, crying in a pool of blood after his mother's murder, much as Dexter had been found by Harry when he was three. Ten years later, Harrison appears troubled and traumatized, but does not necesarilly have a "Dark Passenger" like Dexter.

In season 5, Harrison is raised by Dexter, and is watched during the day, and sometimes night, by his Irish Catholic nanny, Sonya. It is a frequent concern of Dexter that there will be signs of a serial killer that will point to the baby following in his footsteps. By season 6, he has a new nanny, Batista's sister Jamie, and does not seem to have endured any permanent psychological impact from his mother's death. Harrison undergoes an appendectomy in the fourth episode, causing Dexter to have a crisis of faith. In season 7, Harrison is missing from a few episodes while he is staying with his half-siblings, Astor and Cody, in Orlando with their grandparents. Harrison bonds with Dexter's girlfriend and fellow serial killer, Hannah McKay. In season 8, Dexter plans to leave Miami with Harrison and start a new life with Hannah in Argentina. Harrison is last seen with Hannah at a cafe in Buenos Aires as she discovers the fate of Dexter.

In Dexter: New Blood, approximately 10 years after the original series' finale, Harrison is now a teenager and reunites with his father in the fictional town of Iron Lake. He adapts to life there, enrolling in school and befriending and later having sex with Angela Bishop's daughter, Audrey. When he learns another student, Ethan Williams (Christian Dell'Edera), is being bullied and is fantasizing about harming his bullies, he confronts and attacks him, making it look like a near-fatal wound was inflicted in self defense. After this, he is hailed as a hero by his peers. Near the end of the series, Harrison helps Dexter kill Kurt Caldwell, but after his father is arrested, he realizes Harry's code is not a substitution for morality. Dexter tells him that the only resolution is for Harrison to kill him, and he does so by gunshot. After this, he reads the note from his father to Hannah, that said "let [Dexter] die so [Harrison] can live", and leaves Iron Lake.

In the first season of Dexter: Resurrection, Harrison has moved to New York City where he works as a bellhop at a hotel. Harrison murders Ryan Foster, a sexual predator who attempts to rape a female hotel guest named Shauna, inadvertently following the Code of Harry. Having survived the shooting and been cleared any crimes, Dexter travels to New York City to find and protect his son. Harrison is troubled by Foster's death, especially when he becomes Detective Claudette Wallace's prime suspect. Harrison is about to turn himself in when Dexter arrives and stops him. Dexter helps Harrison by framing Mia LaPierre for Foster's murder, and they reconcile. Harrison meets a tour guide named Gigi, with whom he connects and develops an interest in becoming a police officer. Harrison has a run-in with Vinny, his friend Elsa's landlord, over a mold problem affecting Elsa's son, and fantasizes about killing him. When he tells his father about this, he arranges to take care of it. At dinner, he discovers that Dexter knows Leon Prater, with Dexter explaining that Prater is a fanatic who recruits serial killers. Harrison stays at Gigi's house until Dexter kills Prater. The next morning, Harrison receives a call from Dexter, who is trapped in Prater's vault. Harrison infiltrates Prater's penthouse as an employee and helps Dexter escape, taking down the billionaire with one of his father's M99 syringes.

In season 2 of Resurrection, a few years later, Harrison has broken up with Gigi, completed college and, in the season premiere, graduates from the police academy. Dexter and Harrison maintain a close relationship and Dexter often keeps Harrison informed of his killings. Harrison dissuades Dexter from going after the New York Ripper as it would draw too much attention and devastate Claudette if she can't catch the killer personally. Dexter misses his son's graduation to hunt down and kill Al Walker after which Harrison has a one-night stand with Fiona Mixon. The next morning, Harrison is assigned to the NYPD's Homicide Division, implied to be at the recommendation of now-Lieutenant Claudette Wallace, and discovers that Fiona is his field training officer and the daughter of Homicide Captain Mixon. As a rookie cop, Harrison takes part in the Five Borough Killer investigation, only to discover that the only witness is Dexter who ironically happened to be in the wrong place at the wrong time to witness the killer's second murder. Harrison helps Dexter to create a police sketch of the killer, but is forced to keep Dexter's involvement a secret as it could draw too much attention from Claudette. Harrison later expresses frustration over the justice system's inability to take down killers like the Ripper or FBK, something that Dexter compares to Harry Morgan's frustration that led him to train Dexter to kill those who fall through the cracks.

=== Introduced in Dexter: New Blood ===
==== Angela Bishop ====
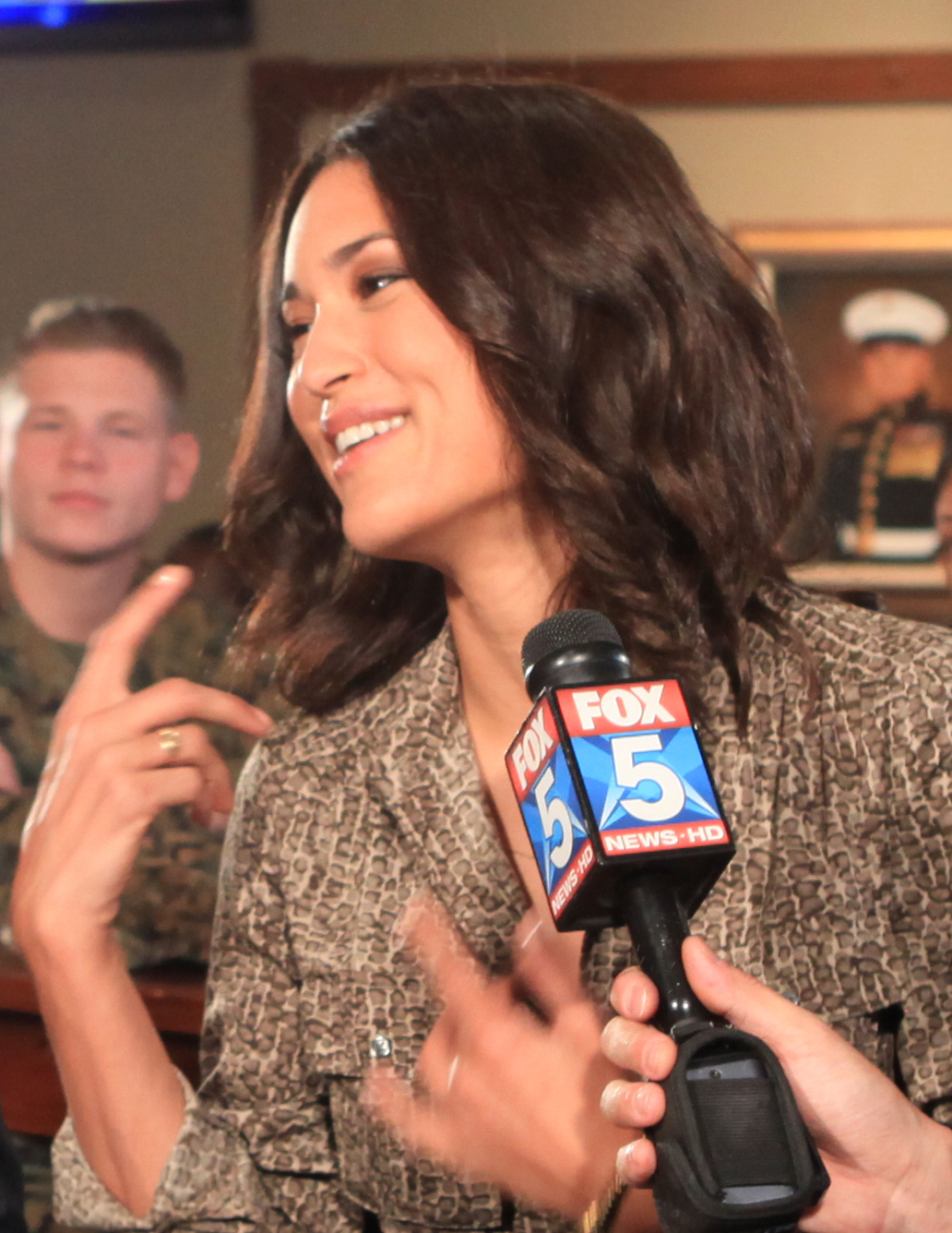
Julia Jones

- Julia Jones (New Blood)

Angela Bishop is a small town, rural New York police chief and Dexter's girlfriend. She is the adoptive mother of Audrey Bishop and a participant in the search for Matt Caldwell. Unlike James Doakes and Maria LaGuerta, who meet their ends while going after Dexter, Angela survives.

In Dexter: Resurrection, it's revealed by Teddy Reed that Angela left town after Dexter's shooting. Before leaving, Angela exonerates Dexter of the murders of Matt Caldwell and Sergeant Logan. Although Angela backtracks on Dexter being the Bay Harbor Butcher, she has made Angel Batista suspicious of Dexter's guilt. Teddy gives Dexter a picture of Angela and her friend Iris whose murder Dexter has helped her to solve with a note on the back from Angela telling him that "[they]'re even", and to leave Iron Lake.

==== Audrey Bishop ====
- Johnny Sequoyah (New Blood)

Audrey Bishop is the adoptive daughter of Angela Bishop. She enters a relationship with Dexter's son, Harrison.

==== Logan ====
- Alano Miller (New Blood)

Logan is a police officer in Iron Lake serving under Chief Angela Bishop. Logan was also close friends with Dexter, who he knew as 'Jim Lindsay', and took a mentorship role towards Harrison when he arrived in Iron Lake. After Dexter is arrested for the possibility of being the Bay Harbour Butcher as well as the murder of Matt Caldwell, Logan still hopes he is innocent. To escape from his cell, Dexter lures him over and slams his head against the bars, before putting him in a chokehold and demanding his keys. Realizing Angela was right about him, Logan draws his gun and attempts to shoot Dexter: Dexter avoids the shot though, and snaps Logan's neck. He then steals his keys and escapes the cell and station.

In Dexter: Resurrection, as Dexter recovers in the hospital from his shooting, he's visited by Teddy Reed who is now the Acting Sheriff of Iron Lake. To Dexter's surprise, Teddy reveals that he was ultimately cleared of the murders of both Matt Caldwell and Logan. Matt's murder was attributed to his father, serial killer Kurt Caldwell, while Logan's death was ruled to be self-defense after Angela found the bullet hole in his cell.

==== Kurt Caldwell ====
- Clancy Brown (New Blood)

Kurt Caldwell is the father of Matt Caldwell and owner of a truck stop diner. He is secretly a serial killer, primarily targeting runaway women. He is typically hospitable and nice to his targets, giving them food and shelter in his cabin. He does, however, have a door that locks from the outside and a surveillance camera in the room, under which are written the words "you're already dead." After his victims see the text, Kurt unlocks the door for the victim, who flees from the cabin, only for him to shoot them in the back with a bolt-action hunting rifle, preserve their bodies and keep them in his underground gallery.

After Matt is murdered by Dexter, Kurt rallies a search party, only to lie that Matt is still alive after the search threatens to expose his illegal activities. Kurt continues to investigate Matt's death on his own, eventually uncovering that Dexter is responsible for the murder. Kurt takes Harrison under his wing as a form of revenge, encouraging the boy's dark impulses and intending to kill him in front of Dexter. After an attempt on Harrison and Dexter's lives fail, Kurt attempts to murder them by setting Dexter's cabin on fire, only to realize his bunker has been infiltrated after receiving a notification on his phone from his security system. Kurt returns home, where he is killed and dismembered by Dexter. The bodies of his victims are later found by Angela after a tip from Dexter, and she contacts the FBI and the New York State Police for help with dealing with them.

In Dexter: Resurrection, Kurt is publicly known to be a serial killer, and the death of Matt is attributed to him rather than to Dexter.

Kurt Caldwell is based on serial killer Robert Hansen.

=== Introduced in Dexter: Resurrection ===
==== Blessing Kamara ====
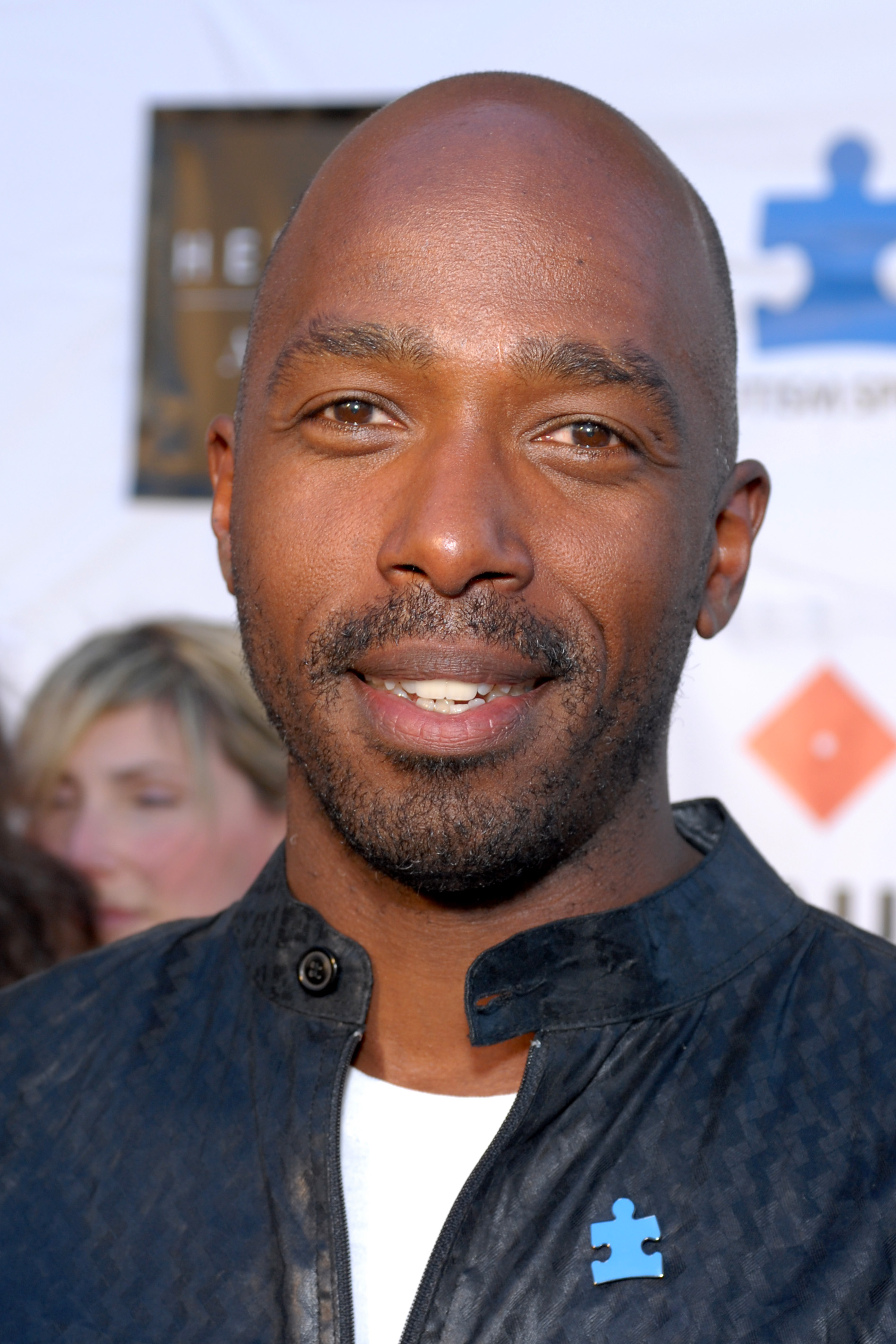
Ntare Guma Mbaho Mwine

- Ntare Guma Mbaho Mwine (Resurrection)

Blessing Kamara is Dexter's landlord and a rideshare driver. He meets Dexter by driving him to the impound lot and gives him pointers on how to be a good rideshare driver. Blessing also gives Dexter an apartment to live in and becomes friends with the family. Blessing struggles to cope with his mother's death, yelling at his daughter Joy's boyfriend in front of Dexter. Blessing apologizes to Dexter for this and explains his troubled past as a child soldier in the Revolutionary United Front until his mother rescued him. When Dexter tells Joy about this, Blessing confronts him and gets angry, but when Dexter apologizes, he forgives him.

==== Leon Prater ====
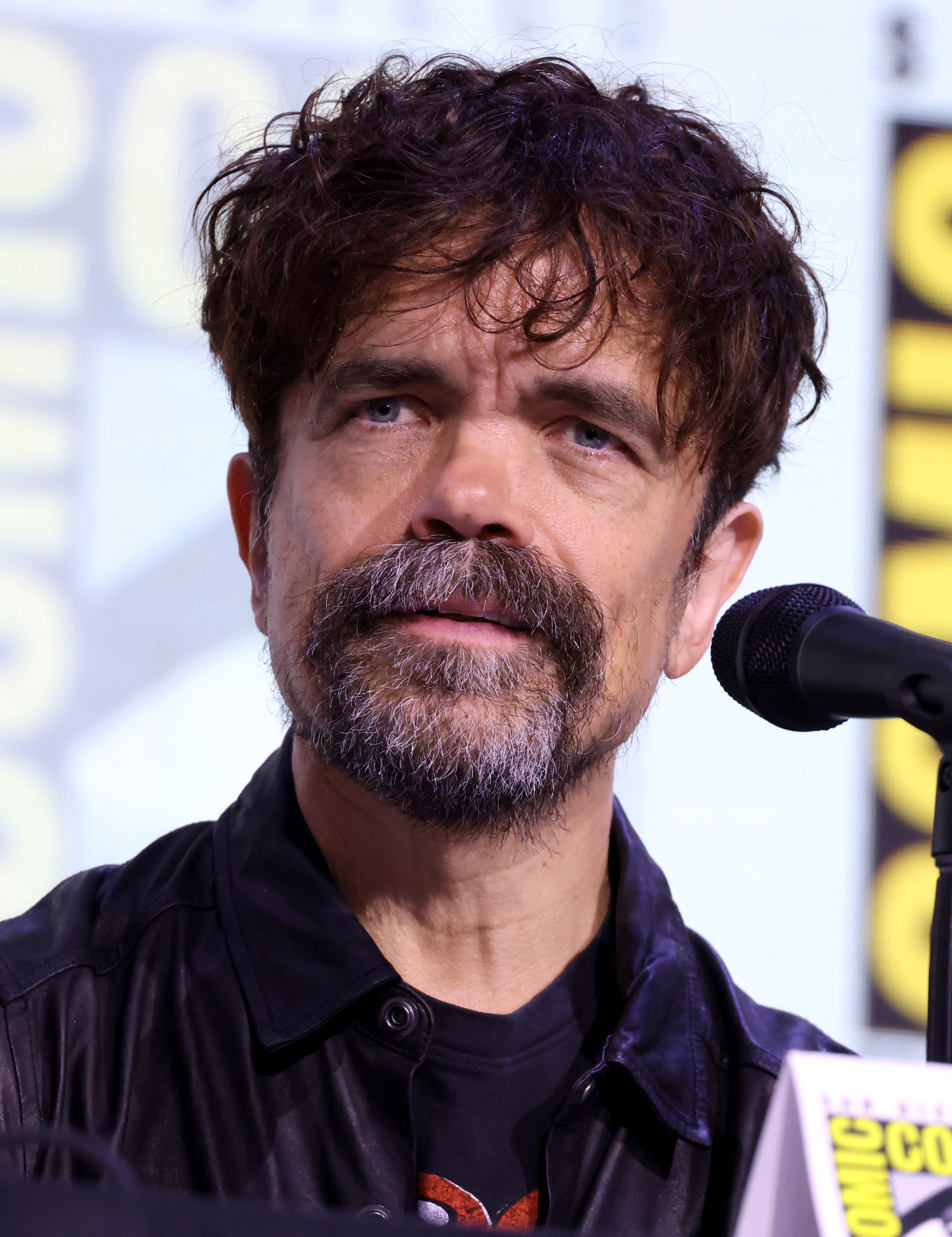
Peter Dinklage

- Peter Dinklage (Resurrection)

Leon Prater is the main antagonist of the first season of Dexter: Resurrection. He is a billionaire venture capitalist who hosts a secret gathering of serial killers. His parents were murdered when he was young, and he felt the need to connect with the killer. Prater recruits a killer known as the "Dark Passenger," but Dexter infiltrates the group using that name. Dexter takes down the criminals of the gathering, and Prater eventually discovers Dexter is the Bay Harbor Butcher. After killing Angel Batista, he traps Dexter in his vault, but he escapes and manages to catch and kill Prater, without taking a blood slide. In the second season, Prater is believed by the NYPD to have disappeared to a private island.

==== Charley Brown ====
- Uma Thurman (Resurrection)

Charlotte "Charley" Brown is Leon Prater's chief of security. She was hired by Prater to "make problems disappear", and she is able to kill serial killers that violate the rules of the secret gathering. After Charley threatens Harrison, Dexter learns that she is a decorated ex-Special Forces operator and works for Prater because he pays for the treatment of Charley's terminally ill mother Mildred. At the end of the first season of Dexter: Resurrection, she finds out that Prater had been keeping tabs on her, and quits her job.

In season 2, a few years later, Charley returns and offers Dexter her help in hunting the remaining killers of Prater's club. Charley claims to want to make amends, remorseful for her actions after Mildred expressed disgust and horror when Charley told her mother the truth before she died. Dexter notes that Charley is a better accomplice thanks to her skill and motivation. With Charley's help, Dexter is able to kill Ray Ballard, the Sleepy-Eyed Stranger, and rescue his kidnapped victim before the pair turn their attention to the Jawsplitter.

==== Claudette Wallace ====
- Kadia Saraf (Resurrection)

Claudette Wallace is a detective for the NYPD, characterized as often "seeing things others miss", and as having an apparent deficiency for empathy. Detective Melvin Oliva is her partner. She is obsessed with the unsolved case of the New York Ripper. She investigates the murder of Ryan Foster, coming to suspect Harrison for his lack of an alibi: the killing is attributed to Mia LaPierre, however, because of Ryan's watch Dexter had planted in her apartment. At the gala for injured officers, the alarm of Prater's vault is sounded and she comes in to see Don Framt (the New York Ripper)'s kill weapon, proving Dexter's theory, which she heard earlier while at a college giving a speech engagement, right.

In season 2, a few years later, Claudette has been promoted to lieutenant and assigns Harrison to the Homicide Division. She has grown increasingly obsessed with catching Don Framt, who has eluded conviction for his crimes. When the killer taunts Claudette by loudly singing the song "Stayin’ Alive" (which she frequently listens to), she attacks him, leading to Claudette being taken off the case. She reveals afterward that her obsession comes from the night that as a rookie officer, she found one of Framt's victims while the song was playing. Claudette would realize that she had passed the killer on the stairs, causing her to blame herself for not stopping him. Claudette leads the investigation into the Five Borough Killer.

==== Melvin Oliva ====
- Dominic Fumusa (Resurrection)

Melvin Oliva is a detective for the NYPD, and Claudette Wallace's partner: he works every case together with her. He is a divorced father of two teenage daughters.

== Supporting characters ==
=== Relatives of Dexter and Rita ===
==== Astor Bennett ====
- Christina Robinson

Astor Bennett is the daughter of Paul and Rita Bennett. When Paul returns home from prison, Astor, who remembers her father's abuse (and is in fact the one who called the police on Paul), is saddened but comes to love her father, who appears to have changed. She forces Paul to promise that he would not hit Rita again. She has a good relationship with both Paul and Dexter, oblivious to the tension between the two men. At the end of the first season, Paul is back in prison and Rita tells him that he can either explain to Astor and Cody all the bad things he has done or never see them again.

During season two, Astor tries to maintain her relationship with Dexter even though he breaks up with her mother. Dexter's love for Astor and Cody helps convince Rita to rekindle their relationship.

In season 3, Astor brings out a protective streak in Dexter, in that Dexter kills a pedophile who was targeting her. He also considers her and Cody his family; in the aforementioned episode, he refers to them as his "cubs", and later says that nobody hurts "his children". Astor is the maid of honor at Dexter and Rita's wedding.

In season 4, Astor starts to act out: being rude to both Dexter and her mother, being constantly angry, and flirting with an older boy. She and Dexter come to a peace after he promises to stop treating her like a child and admits that sometimes he is simply "dumb". Her attitude improves following this, though not by much. When he tries to become more involved with Astor's life, she often becomes hostile, at one point even asking "why do you hate me?" when he tries to suggest after-school activities.

In season 5, Astor lashes out at Dexter in anger, blaming him for the death of their mother and for raising false hope that they could be a normal family. In episode 2, she and her brother move in with her grandparents in Orlando after her mother's death. In episode 9 of the season, Astor appears at Dexter and Rita's old home, to Dexter and Lumen's surprise, since Lumen is residing in the home at the time. She and her friend, Olivia, are drunk and Dexter allows her to stay there, wanting to patch things up with his stepdaughter. While initially uncooperative, when her friend's domestic abuse issues are brought to light, Dexter takes matters into his own hands and teaches Olivia's stepfather a lesson and drives him away. Astor thanks him for his support, having thought that he would not want to help, and invites him into their grandparents' house. By the end of season 5, Astor is ready to agree to spending the summer with Dexter.

Astor returns in season 7, episode 8, along with her brother Cody. It is revealed that she now smokes pot.

In the books, Astor and her brother Cody are two parts of a whole, with Cody performing killings and Astor acting as a sort of mentor who watches. Both she and her brother are kidnapped in Double Dexter, a sequel novel by Jeff Lindsay.

==== Cody Bennett ====
- Daniel Goldman (season 1, 11 episodes)
- Preston Bailey (season 2 to season 7, 34 episodes)

Cody Bennett is the son of Paul and Rita Bennett. Cody does not remember the abuse his mother suffered at the hands of his father, so, when Paul returns home from prison, he is overjoyed. He has a good relationship with both Paul and Dexter, oblivious to the tension between the two men.

During season 2, Cody tries to maintain his relationship with Dexter, even though he breaks up with their mother; he hides toys in his bag, forcing him to come to their home to return it, and asks Dexter to attend an oral report he makes in class. Dexter's love for Cody and Astor helps convince Rita to rekindle their relationship.

As season 3 begins, Dexter's relationship with Cody has developed to such an extent that Cody asks him to be a speaker at his school for Parent's Day, while Dexter's presentation of himself as a blood-spatter specialist does not go well with the other kids, Cody tells him that it would have been worse if Dexter had not been there. He also considers Astor and Cody his family; he refers to them as his "cubs", and later says that nobody hurts "his children". Cody is the ring-bearer at Dexter and Rita's wedding.

Cody learns of his mother's death but displays no hostility towards Dexter, even growing closer to him. But when Astor insists that she wants to leave Miami and live in Orlando with her grandparents, Dexter makes Cody go with his sister because he believes the bond between him and Astor is something he should preserve. In later episodes, Dexter notes that he is still talking with Cody. After Dexter dropped Astor off, he claims that Cody has grown a foot taller since he last saw him.

Cody returned in season 7, episode 8, along with his sister Astor.

In the books, Astor and her brother Cody are two parts of a whole, with Cody performing killings and Astor acting as a sort of mentor who watches. Cody is able to sense Dexter's "Dark Passenger".

==== Doris Morgan ====
- Kathrin Lautner Middleton (Dexter)
- Jasper Lewis (Original Sin)

Doris Morgan is Debra's biological and Dexter's adoptive mother. She died of cancer when Debra was 16. Doris is seen briefly in two flashbacks in season 1, in one scene in a picture that is replicated by the Ice Truck Killer, and in the other urging her husband to contact Dexter's biological father for a blood transfusion, and again in another flashback in season 2, suggesting that Dexter be tested by a psychologist. In Original Sin, despite her death shortly before the main story takes place she is seen in flashbacks throughout the first season, which reveal that she and Harry had another son before Debra, Harry Jr., who died due to Harry’s negligence, and it is also shown that after Debra was born, she revealed she knew about Harry’s affair, though not who with, and told him to end it now that he was a father again, which he did. After Dexter's mother's death she discovered that she was the woman Harry cheated on her with, but didn’t hold it against either of her sons and said they needed a mother, being willing to adopt them. However, after seeing Brian try to suffocate Debra with a pillow for being too noisy, she told Harry, and after Brian displayed violence to them they gave him back to social services, though they kept Dexter. In the present, following her death, Dexter claims, at her grave, that she saw good in him, even if he could not see it himself.

==== Laura Moser ====
- Sage Kirkpatrick (Dexter)
- Brittany Allen (Original Sin)

Laura Lynn Moser is Dexter and Brian's biological mother. She was involved in the drug trade and had a habit of painting her fingernails in different colors. She and three others were sawed into pieces in a shipping container as her two sons watched, causing their murderous urges. In the second season, it is revealed that Laura had an affair with Harry Morgan and was working as a police informant, trying to get evidence against Santos Jimenez's boss. She is not named in the books and no such revelation is made. Laura appears in season 3 during two of Dexter's visualizations of Harry. While Dexter is tracking a victim on a cruise, she sits with Harry as if they were vacationing together, much to Dexter's discomfort. In the season finale, she appeared, again with Harry, at Dexter's wedding appearing to be happy for her son. Her mugshot was also briefly seen on Debra's desk as she investigated her father's infidelity. When Debra's investigation of another informant (coincidentally the file before Laura's) leads her to discover her father having multiple affairs with informants, she angrily gives up on her search; Dexter takes this opportunity to shred Laura's file and her photo, but is unable to go through with the photo ("I can't let her be cut up again") and keeps the upper half in his desk. Despite Dexter's efforts, Debra and a former informant locate Laura's house, which ultimately links Dexter to Laura, and to Brian.

==== Brian Moser ====
- Christian Camargo (Dexter)
- Brandon Killham (child - Dexter)
- Xander Mateo (child - Original Sin, Resurrection)
- Roby Attal (Original Sin)

Brian Moser (alias Rudy Cooper / "The Ice Truck Killer"), is Dexter's biological older brother and one of the main antagonists of the Dexter franchise. He acts as the main antagonist of the first season, a posthumous minor antagonist in the second season and a posthumous major antagonist in the sixth season of the original series. He also returns as the secondary antagonist of Dexter: Original Sin, and one of the overarching antagonists of Dexter: Resurrection.

As children, both brothers witnessed the chainsaw murder of their mother, Laura, and afterward were left for two days with her body in a shipping container until the police found them. The memory lay buried in Dexter's subconscious for years until a therapist unknowingly reawakens the memory.

In the aftermath of the killings, Harry Morgan, the officer-on-scene, adopted Dexter, while Brian was left in the state's care. Brian believed that Morgan did not want anything to do with him because he saw him as a "fucked up kid". Brian suffered severe psychological trauma due to the experiences in the container and was left in a mental institution, where over time he became a violent psychopath, resulting in him also becoming a brutal murderer, even more dangerous than Dexter himself.

Upon being released, he went underground, refining his ability to kill and taking on the identity of a plumber he killed (Rudy Cooper) as an alias, all while searching for his brother. Eventually, Brian not only discovered Dexter's location and history upon being separated, but also discovered he was similarly "damaged"; upon learning this, Brian immediately plotted to reunite with Dexter for the purpose of killing people side by side.

Brian went to Miami, working as a prosthetist and murdering prostitutes as the "Ice Truck Killer". At some of his kills and at Dexter's apartment, Brian leaves clues to his and Dexter's past. Brian develops a relationship with Debra, Dexter's adoptive sister, while treating one of his own victims, Tony Tucci. As Debra falls in love with him, he uses Debra as a means to get closer to Dexter. The week before Dexter is informed of the death of his biological father (Joseph Driscoll) and meets Brian Moser for the first time, Brian disguised himself as a cable repair man and visited the house of the deceased man. At the end of the ninth episode of the first season, it is implied that Brian has murdered Joseph Driscoll while in disguise by injecting insulin. The body is cremated before Dexter can find any evidence of murder. Brian slowly begins to show more of an interest in spending time with Dexter. When Brian talks to Dexter about possibly marrying Debra, he lies about a cut on his lip. He tells Dexter it is the result of a lab accident, but in reality he received the cut while attacking and nearly killing Angel Batista. This leads Dexter to the realization that Brian is the Ice Truck Killer. Brian immediately kidnaps Debra, which leads to the police suspecting his involvement in the Ice Truck Killer case.

After searching Brian's apartment, Dexter tracks him down at the site of their childhood home, where Dexter recalls that they were brothers. Brian tells Dexter his history after their separation, and tries to convince him to kill Debra in the same manner that Dexter kills his victims. Dexter refuses, leading to a fight between the two as the police arrive. Brian escapes the house and disappears.

Brian later attempts to kill Debra when he thinks she is staying at Dexter's apartment, but instead falls into a trap set by Dexter, who then brings him to the cooling room where Brian committed his murders. After a few choice words between them, a heartbroken Dexter slashes Brian's throat and drains his blood into a bucket, killing him in the same way as Brian did his victims. The manner of death and the hesitance in Brian's cut lead pathologists to conclude that the Ice Truck Killer killed himself.

Brian's death leaves Dexter extremely conflicted, to the point that he begins making mistakes in his killing rituals. In early episodes of the second season, Brian appears to Dexter as a visualization and, in the end, Dexter learns he needs to let go of his feelings about his brother before he can move on with his life.

However, Brian returns as the dark side of Dexter after he avenges the murder of Brother Sam, becoming a darker advisor parallel to his father. After an escapade in Nebraska in which Dexter confronts a seemingly-murderous Jonah Mitchell, Dexter's adherence to the Code of Harry and Jonah's guilt lead to Dexter reaffirming his faith in his father, who returns at the end of the episode while Brian vanishes.

In Dexter: Original Sin, a young Brian appears in flashbacks to Harry's investigation into the cartel. Brian is initially taken in by Harry following Laura's murder, but after he tries to kill Debra, Harry returns Brian to social services. Brian goes through a series of foster homes and eventually institutionalized where he is diagnosed with antisocial personality disorder.

Following his release from the mental hospital in 1991, Brian becomes a serial killer investigated by Harry known as the N.H.I. Killer who Harry discovers is killing people who separated Brian and Dexter as well as Brian's bullies from the foster homes. He has also been present at the crime scenes to observe his brother investigating. Harry confronts Brian who was dismayed, upon secretly meeting Dexter, that Dexter has forgotten that he even has a brother. Harry attempts to convince Brian that the best thing that he can do is to let Dexter go as Harry has provided a good life for him. Neither man is able to kill each other but, after knocking Harry unconscious, Brian leaves him a message in blood that "you're right." Nevertheless, Brian watches over the Morgan family from a distance.

In the finale of Dexter: Resurrection, Brian appears as a vision to Dexter, telling him to let go of the code. Dexter dismisses the message.

In Darkly Dreaming Dexter (unlike in the TV series), Brian does not use the name Rudy Cooper and does not get romantically involved with Debra. He is described as resembling Dexter so strongly that, upon seeing an image of Brian with dismembered corpses, Dexter and Debra are convinced that Dexter is the murderer; when they meet, Dexter notes that Brian is an inch or two taller, thicker through the shoulders and chest, and paler. He first meets Dexter face-to-face in a shipping container located in the same place as the one where their mother was murdered, with Debra tied up and ready for Dexter to kill. Rather than killing either Debra or Brian, Dexter lets him go, whereas he kills him in the TV series, recognizing that it is the only way to save his sister. Their professions differ as well; the books have Brian working with imports, while the series has him as a prosthetic surgeon. The age gap between Brian and Dexter is given as one year in the book and five years in the television series. In the books he is known as the Tamiami Slasher; in the show, he is known as the Ice Truck Killer. Brian returns in Dexter is Delicious after learning of the birth of Dexter's daughter. He introduces himself to Dexter's family, and he worked for the cannibalist coven that would later lure Dexter and Debra into a trap, later saving them from the cannibals.

==== Joe Driscoll ====
Joseph "Joe" Driscoll was the biological father of Dexter. His exact relationship with Laura Moser is not made clear, nor is it specified whether he fathered Brian Moser as well. Joe claimed he got his spider web tattoo on his right elbow while serving in the Vietnam War, but Dexter notes it is actually a prison tattoo. When Laura was exposed and murdered for being involved with the police in their attempts to bring a drug cartel to justice, Joe went underground and resettled in Dade City, Florida working as an insurance adjuster. This was why "Joe" adopted an alias; his real name remains unknown. Dexter does not know or remember anything about Joe until he sees his tattoo on his corpse. He later learns he was an expert bowler and recovered from his drug abuse.

Harry Morgan, Dexter's adopted father, was able to track Joe down, and convinced him to give a transfusion of his rare blood when Dexter was injured in an accident and needed surgery. Joe then received a handmade thank-you card which he kept for the rest of his life and Dexter find after his death. His will named Dexter as executor and sole heir.

Joe met his death at the age of 60, when Brian (now the Ice Truck Killer and going under the alias of "Rudy Cooper"), who knew it was the best way to reconnect with his long-lost brother, tracked Joe down and accessed his house while posing as a cable repairman. Brian was able to slip Joe a sedative, and then injected him with insulin, causing Joe to have a seizure and die of cardiac arrest.

When Dexter, Rita, Debra (Dexter's adoptive sister) and "Rudy" come to sort out Joe's house, Dexter takes blood samples of himself and Joe and sends them to Vince Masuka to perform a DNA test, which comes back as a match. Dexter suspects that Joe's apparent heart attack was actually murder. However, the body is cremated before Dexter can obtain proof, and thus he never learns what Brian has done. Rudy and Dexter steal Joe's ashes and scatter them at Joe's local bowling alley.

Joe and Dexter, when compared, are shown to have great physical resemblance, and Dexter also inherits his father's bowling skill.

In Dexter: Original Sin, Joe is seen in 1973 refusing to cooperate with Harry's operation to take down Hector Estrada. After Laura's murder, the state turns to Joe, who has no interest in taking in Brian and Dexter.

==== Gail Brandon ====
- JoBeth Williams

Gail Brandon is Rita's mother, Astor, Cody and Harrison's grandmother and Dexter's mother-in-law. Gail is a former public-school teacher who was fired by the school board due to "philosophical disagreements" (she disapproved of what she saw as the gradual acceptance of mediocrity in the way schools treat children and made her feelings well-known). She has extremely high standards, making her judgmental of her daughter and her grandchildren. After she arrives, she becomes suspicious of Dexter, claiming that he is hiding something. She distrusts Dexter, and believes him to be a drug addict, and believes Rita is repeating her mistake with Paul by getting involved with another addict. Near the end of season 2, her attitude causes Rita to break off her ties with her mother and force her to leave her home and return to Michigan, not wanting her children to be exposed to her the way she was. In season 3, Gail refuses to attend Dexter and Rita's wedding, claiming that because she has started teaching again she was too busy. She does, however, send a scathing card expressing her hope that Rita's third marriage would be "the charm", though Rita is hiding that fact in stating that her mother means the third child (it is also revealed that her surname, and therefore Rita's maiden name, is "Brandon").

==== Paul Bennett ====
- Mark Pellegrino

Paul Bennett is Rita's abusive and manipulative ex-husband and the father of Astor and Cody. After his release from prison, to which he was sentenced for nearly beating Rita to death, he tries to rekindle a relationship with his children, though he still harbors disdain for Rita. Paul (correctly) suspects Dexter of framing him for the drug charge that sends him to his latest stint in jail. After a short while in a federal prison, he loses hope after failing to convince Rita of Dexter's plan to frame him. Rita later tells Dexter that he provoked a fight shortly thereafter with another inmate, who beat him to death with a pipe.

In the book series, Rita's ex-husband is mentioned but never makes an appearance (or is named) since he is dead before the events of the books. In the TV series, by contrast, Paul appears in the second half of the first season and in the first episode of the second season, and his interactions with Dexter lead to a key plot point. In the books, he beat Rita's children as well as beating and raping her; in the series he clearly loves his children, the two of them appearing ignorant of the full reasons why their parents split up, and his violent tendencies are directed only toward Rita, though she says that "she bore his abuse so they wouldn't have to", suggesting that he would have beaten them too. In the TV series, it is Astor who finally calls the police on Paul, while in the book series Rita does when he begins to beat Astor and Cody as well.

==== Bill & Maura Bennett ====
- Steve Eastin
- Kathleen Noone

William "Bill" & Maura Bennett are Paul's parents, living in Orlando. They are quite the opposite of their son, providing love and comfort to both Rita and her kids after her separation from Paul. First appearing (played by unknown extras) in the season four finale, taking their grandchildren to Walt Disney World, they return to Miami in the season five premiere, only to learn of Rita's murder.

After Rita's funeral, as Astor decides she wants to live with her grandparents, rather than Dexter, Bill and Maura bring both their grandchildren with them back to Orlando. Although they are not Harrison's biological grandparents, they have shown love and have cared for him when Dexter needed them to.

=== Additional characters, introduced in season 1 ===
==== Camilla Figg ====
- Margo Martindale (Dexter)
- Sarah Kinsey (Original Sin)

The Camilla Figg of the books and television series differ significantly. In the books, Camilla Figg is a young member of the forensics team who has a crush on Dexter. She is later killed by Bernard Elan, who attempts to use her obsession with Dexter to make him suffer.

In the television series, Camilla is older than Dexter, and had a close relationship with his father. She is a records supervisor at the Miami Metro Police Station. She and her husband, Gene, were good friends with Harry Morgan and his wife. She also knew Dexter and Debra while they were children and remains friends with Dexter, who often brings donuts to her workplace at the records room. She knows far more about Dexter's past than she lets on to him and finally tells him that, on Harry Morgan's orders, she destroyed the file of the crime scene where he had found the young Dexter to protect him. Near the end of the second season, she informs Dexter this will be her last year working as she is retiring. In season 3, it is revealed that she has terminal lung cancer just like her husband, who died one year earlier, as they were both smokers. On her deathbed, Figg reveals that she knew that the Ice Truck Killer was Dexter's brother, as she read his report before destroying it. During her agony, she frequently asks Dexter to bring her the "perfect key lime pie" until he realizes it is meant as a euphemism for euthanasia. Dexter complies with her wishes, but before she dies he tells her that it was he who killed his brother. She surprises him by smiling and telling him that "it's good you did" right before she dies. She is the first victim of Dexter's who wanted to die by his hands as well as the first victim he felt he showed mercy towards.

In Dexter: Original Sin, a young Camilla is amongst Dexter's coworkers at Miami Metro. While borrowing her boat, Dexter gets the idea for dumping his victims into the ocean.

==== Esmee Pascal ====
- Judith Scott

Lieutenant Esmee Pascal is a Haitian American police officer who becomes well-respected (considered a "real up-and-comer" by Captain Matthews) after being shot in the line of duty but recovering. When LaGuerta oversteps her authority and embarrasses Captain Matthews with new developments in the Ice Truck Killer case, Matthews brings Pascal in to replace her. Pascal remains lieutenant of the department well over a month after the end of the case, earning the trust of the police officers and friendship of LaGuerta, but soon begins to crack under pressure when she starts to experience personal problems with her fiancé Bertrand (portrayed by Kiko Ellsworth). She suspects him of cheating with little real evidence, which gradually casts doubt on her rationality. Her obsession becomes so strong that she uses department resources to investigate him, tracking his phone calls and having the forensics department do tests on his shirt (stating it had the smell of another woman on it). As a result of this, Captain Matthews becomes increasingly concerned that he had made the wrong decision in replacing LaGuerta with Pascal, but LaGuerta remains stalwart, apparently standing behind Pascal on principle of loyalty. Captain Matthews is impressed by LaGuerta, believing her to have abandoned her political scheming, and returns control of the Homicide Division to LaGuerta. It is later revealed that LaGuerta manipulated the whole incident, and was the one having an affair with Pascal's fiancé to try to get rid of Pascal and get her old job back.

=== Additional characters, introduced in season 2 ===
==== Frank Lundy ====
- Keith Carradine

Frances "Frank" Lundy is a high-ranking and illustrious FBI Special Agent, serving as one of their manhunters and the Bureau's top agent. He becomes one of the main antagonists of season 2 after being recruited by Cpt. Matthews to lead the task force devoted to hunting the Bay Harbor Butcher.

Lundy is composed, calm, confident, and intelligent. He learned about the criminal mind, often finding the important case evidence the frustrated Miami PD normally overlooks. Lundy is legendary with police agencies due to him breaking impossible high-profile criminal cases (e.g. the real-life Green River Killer and the DC Sniper). On a personal level, he had a wife, who died due to cancer, and a daughter. He is fond of classical music. Lundy devotes 15 years of his career to hunting down the "Trinity Killer", tracking him and seeing him as the most elusive serial killer he has ever encountered, but cannot convince any of his colleagues that Trinity even exists.

During the hunt for the Bay Harbor Butcher, Lundy becomes dangerously close to realizing that Dexter is the Butcher he is seeking, and at the same time becomes involved in a relationship with Debra, helping her get over her left-over chaotic emotions from her time as the prisoner of the Ice Truck Killer. In the end, Dexter outmaneuvers and frames Doakes as the Butcher, causing Lundy to lead the entire police force in a full-scale manhunt to find Doakes. After Doakes is killed in a seemingly accidental explosion, the case is considered closed and Lundy moves on to find another serial killer in Oregon.

Although Lundy retires from the FBI some time later, he continues his mission of hunting the Trinity Killer. After tracking him to Miami, Lundy, no longer possessing access to the full resources of the FBI, asks for Dexter's and Debra's help in pursuing the Trinity Killer. Eventually, Lundy begins to close in on Trinity, going so far as to predict where and when the murders would occur, as well as identifying Arthur Mitchell (albeit unnamed) as a suspect. In the course of the investigation, Lundy and Debra rekindle their relationship, but shortly afterward, both Lundy and Debra are shot by an unseen gunman. Lundy bleeds out and dies from his injuries. Dexter mourns Lundy's death, having seen him as a "worthy adversary" and feeling that he deserved a more fitting end. Debra, however, blames herself for what happened. The killer is eventually discovered to be Trinity's daughter Christine Hill who commits suicide upon being caught.

In season 7, it is revealed that Lundy always doubted Doakes's culpability, and wrote about that in his notes. Eventually, Maria LaGuerta discovered them.

==== Gabriel Bosque ====
- Dave Baez

Gabriel Bosque is a writer who becomes Debra's first boyfriend after Brian Moser. He first appears in the episode "Waiting to Exhale" where he meets Debra Morgan at a workout gym. Noticing that Debra is checking him out, he offers to help her start training with a punching bag. This does not bode well; while taping up her hands, Debra has a flashback of her abduction by Brian. She quickly runs from the scene with little explanation. She apologizes a little later, however, and they start going out. She takes him back to Dexter's apartment where she handcuffs him to the bed on the grounds that the last person she slept with tried to kill her, and Dexter walks in on them by accident. She begins to wrongly become suspicious of Gabriel and goes as far as searching his belongings and checking his e-mails. She finds an e-mail concerning a story he has written called "The Ice Princess" and believes that he is writing a story about her and leaves him accusingly. She then learns that he is trying to be a children's writer and apologizes. They go on several more dates but she breaks up with him due to her increasing attraction to Frank Lundy.

==== Lila West ====
- Jaime Murray

Lila West, who goes by the pseudonym Lila Tournay, is Dexter's Narcotics Anonymous sponsor and one of the main antagonists in season 2. Originally from England, she works as an artist, often using stolen items in her work. Dexter begins an affair with her after his breakup with Rita. She confesses to Dexter that she became sober after unintentionally killing her ex-boyfriend while high on meth. She is, in fact, a sociopath who hangs out in support groups in an attempt to feel emotions she is otherwise incapable of feeling. She immediately sees through Dexter's "mask" and becomes obsessed with him, believing him to be her soulmate.

She sets her own loft on fire and helps Santos Jimenez attack Dexter, believing that she and Dexter are closest in times of crisis. When she breaks into Rita's house, afraid that Dexter might have gotten back together with her, Dexter ends their relationship.

In retaliation, she seduces Angel Batista, has rough sex with him, and then accuses him of rape, having taken Rohypnol immediately after sex so it would look like Angel had drugged her. Enraged, Debra asks Lundy to run a background check, discovering Lila is working under an alias. A fingerprint analysis turns up Lila's real surname (West) and that she has been illegally living in the United States on an expired visa. Debra confronts her and demands that she leave the country or be deported. Lila, following Dexter and watching him on his boat with Rita, Astor, and Cody, breaks into his van, takes his GPS device and finds the address for Jimenez's cabin. Arriving at the cabin, she finds Doakes caged inside and, upon learning from him that Dexter is the Bay Harbor Butcher, decides to protect Dexter and ignites a propane tank inside the cabin, killing Doakes.

After finding evidence that Lila killed Doakes, Dexter has the justification he needs for killing Lila. Dexter gathers his tools in a bag and goes to Lila's apartment under the guise that they will leave town together. Dexter's plan is foiled when Debra shows up and Lila walks in on them. Lila leaves the apartment, taking Dexter's bag with her. Upon examination of the bag, Lila learns of Dexter's plan to kill her.

She abducts Astor and Cody and uses them to lure Dexter inside her loft, and sets it ablaze again. Dexter and the kids narrowly escape, and Lila flees Miami. While living in Paris, Lila checks her mail and discovers a postcard from Miami with Doakes' picture on the back. Dexter emerges from the shadows, injects Lila with a spinal epidural (so he can speak his peace to her while also ensuring that her death is painless), and lays her down on the couch. Lila pleads for her life and tells him that she killed Doakes for Dexter's sake. Dexter asks if she tried to kill Rita's children for his sake as well, thanks her for helping him embrace what he is, and then stabs her through the heart. He wraps her corpse in a plastic garment bag.

Lila is so far one of the few main antagonists who was not given an official nickname. However, she has been called a "vampire" by Debra as an insult, alluding to her skin, which, according to Debra, is "pale like a fucking corpse". Lila has a penchant for committing arson, especially in order to murder other people by locking them in the building that she is burning/exploding. Throughout the season she exhibits other psychopathic tendencies as well, including manipulating and taking advantage of Dexter and others. She is mentioned once by Rita and once by Vince in season 4. She and Hannah McKay are the only female main antagonists throughout the series.

==== Francis ====
- Tasia Sherel

Francis is a friend of Debra, and the successor to Camilla Figg as the records supervisor of the Miami Metro Police Station. She first appears in the episode "The Dark Defender", and has appeared in a total of 7 episodes as of the season 5 finale.

=== Additional characters, introduced in season 3 ===
==== Miguel Prado ====
- Jimmy Smits

Miguel Prado is a senior Assistant District Attorney, infamous for his harsh enforcement of the law, making him powerful, influential and popular with the regular police and citizens of Miami, and the main antagonist of season 3 along with George King. He has a romantic history with Lt. LaGuerta and he comes from a well-connected family, about whom he cares greatly. As such, Prado takes it hard when his younger brother Oscar is found dead in the house of a drug-dealer nicknamed "Freebo", and even worse when it is found Oscar was a drug addict to whom Freebo sold and that Oscar was in Freebo's debt. Prado even goes as far as to learn the Code from Dexter, and is the third person to witness Dexter in his kill room after his father Harry and Sgt. James Doakes. With Dexter's guidance, he would go on to kill a mob enforcer.

Later that same night, without Dexter's knowledge, Prado kills Ellen Wolf, a defense attorney who was trying to ruin his career by claiming some mistakes he made in his cases were "proof" of Prado's claimed "illicit prosecution tactics, which include witness tampering and deliberately ignoring evidence". Dexter is disappointed with Miguel's violation of the Code and digs up Wolf's body for the police to find to teach Prado a lesson. Prado seems to have learned his lesson after a talk with Dexter, but Dexter later begins to doubt the authenticity of Miguel's friendship when he learns Miguel used exactly the same language he used in a talk between them in a talk with Rita about trust. Dexter's suspicions are confirmed when he examines the shirt Miguel gave him after the murder of Freebo. The blood on the shirt is in fact cow blood, and Dexter realizes that Miguel has been manipulating him all along. After a game of one-upmanship with regard to Ellen Wolf's murder case, with Miguel threatening to expose Debra Morgan's relationship with the CI Anton and use his position as ADA to make trouble for Dexter, Dexter decides to kill Miguel using the MO (Modus Operandi) of a sought-for killer, just as LaGuerta discovers Miguel killed Ellen. When Miguel discovers that LaGuerta is investigating him, he plans to kill her. However, Dexter discovers what Miguel is planning, traps him at LaGuerta's house when Prado goes there to kill her, and kills Miguel by garroting him, but not before telling him that he killed his brother.

The entire city of Miami mourns the passing of Miguel Prado, a hero to all, and so the City Council votes to name the city's main freeway interchange after Miguel. This greatly upsets LaGuerta, who is ready to accuse Miguel of murdering Ellen Wolf. Dexter is able to convince her that doing so would only hurt Miguel's family and the Cuban Community, and there is a high chance that nothing could be proven, so she drops it.

It was later discovered through Miguel's brother, Ramon, that he also lied about the story of defending his family from their abusive father where it was, in fact, Ramon who did it. He stated that Miguel "always had to be in the spotlight" and that he had been covering up for Miguel for years.

Miguel is the first main antagonist to die before the last episode of a season.

==== Ramón Prado ====
- Jason Manuel Olazabal

Ramón Prado is one of the three Prado brothers, and is a county sheriff with the rank of lieutenant. He is married to Sara (portrayed by Paula Miranda), and the couple have one son, Carlos (portrayed by Aramis Knight), and a daughter in pre-school.

Ramón and Miguel are both devastated by Oscar's death, with Ramón steadily becoming more and more unstable with time, frustrated with the Miami Police Department's handling of the murder case. Initially, Ramón attempts to keep working, though he steadily slides into alcoholism. In an effort to help his brother, Miguel tries to convince Dexter to tell Ramón about Freebo's death, but is convinced otherwise when Ramón, with a little provoking from Dexter, attacks an innocent person in front of his brother. His increasing recklessness eventually drives him to the point of kidnapping and torturing one of Freebo's clients, which in turn gets him arrested by Debra and Quinn. To avoid a prison sentence, Ramón, largely disgraced in the eyes of his Miami Metro PD colleagues, unwillingly accepts the offer from the police union of early retirement with benefits, and so surrenders his gun and badge.

After Miguel is seemingly killed by the Skinner (really Dexter to stop his murderous rampage), Ramón, desperate for someone to blame, goes out of control. Having been taken on earlier as a bodyguard for Miguel against Dexter (whom he has always had a slight distrust of), is driven to hunt Dexter. Dexter tries to find Ramón without success, but instead Ramón shows up in a drunken rage at Dexter and Rita's rehearsal dinner, and pushes off Dexter's calm attempts at discussion. He instead draws his pistol and jams it in Dexter's face, but is stopped and arrested by Batista and Debra.

Even though "Harry" recommends Dexter kill Ramón out of mercy, Dexter, instead, elects to speak to him while he is languishing in the county jail. Dexter's words make Ramón understand and face his own demons, and brings peace between them. The result is Ramón finally coming out with the source of all his pent-up anger, frustration and distrust: Miguel. All of his life, Ramón remained in his famous brother's shadow (and even helped to build it—such as knocking their abusive father down the stairs and letting Miguel take the credit), that, while Miguel had the appearance, charm, and even the intelligence, Ramón had the strength and spent his whole life holding Miguel's legend together. Now that Miguel was dead, Ramón let go of his harsh behaviors so as to not pass it on to his beloved son and daughter.

As one last favor from his famous brother, Ramón is released a matter of days later.

==== Anton Briggs ====
- David Ramsey

Anton Briggs is a pot-smoking guitarist who is a confidential informant (CI) for Detective Joey Quinn. Quinn helps Debra by giving her Anton's information in hopes that he will help her find a lead to Freebo, to which he obliges. Debra continues to meet with Anton to help her find information about both Freebo and later the Skinner because of his connections. Debra becomes close to Anton and eventually develops a romantic relationship with him, which occasionally clouds her judgment. She also discovers that Anton is not officially a CI because Quinn was trying to do him a favor by keeping it off the books. The police end up using Anton as bait in a possible trap for the Skinner, but Debra objects. the Skinner kidnaps Anton and removes two strips of skin from his back before Debra and Quinn rescue him. After Debra learns that her father cheated on her mother with a CI, she becomes wary of Anton and they eventually break up. At the end of season 3, they get back together when Debra realizes (with the help of Dexter) that her father Harry would have been proud of her for being a great cop and getting her detective shield, regardless of her relationship with Anton. At the start of season 4, their relationship starts to move forward just as Lundy returns and admits he still has feelings for Debra. Debra, who had starts to feel claustrophobic in her relationship with Anton, eventually realizes she returns Lundy's feelings and sleeps with him. This results in Anton and Debra breaking up and Debra leaving his place after she admits she slept with Lundy to Anton. Anton visits Deb in the hospital, where she officially ends their relationship for good. He is not seen since.

==== Yuki Amado ====
- Liza Lapira

Yuki Amado is the Internal Affairs officer who pressures Debra Morgan to give her information on Joey Quinn, promising to help her become a detective in return. Debra does not agree to help, and becomes extremely irritated with Yuki's persistence. Yuki, pressured to move forward in her case on Quinn starts giving Debra orders as if she has agreed to help the case. After being confronted by Debra that Quinn told her that it was just a personal grudge of hers, she states that he is lying and is investigating him because of his alleged tendency to cut corners.

==== Syl Prado ====
- Valerie Cruz

Sylvia "Syl" Prado is Miguel Prado's wife. She is a real-estate agent and becomes close friends with Rita, even hiring her as her assistant. Later, she confides in Rita that she suspects her husband is having an affair. After a miscommunication with Dexter, Rita believes that Prado is cheating on his wife with LaGuerta, which she later tells Syl when trying on bridal outfits. When she sees her husband leaving LaGuerta's house, she comes to believe he has been cheating on her all this time and evicts him from her house. Syl is devastated when Miguel is killed, apparently by the Skinner (really Dexter). In season 8, she appears in her role as a real estate agent to assist Dexter in selling his apartment.

==== Ellen Wolf ====
- Anne Ramsay

Defense Attorney Ellen Wolf is Miguel Prado's main professional rival. Ellen believes Miguel, whom she derides as a "fascistic prosecutor," bends the rules to put innocent people in prison while Miguel believes Ellen helps guilty people get off. Miguel believes that people like Ellen are the root of the problem that Dexter tries to solve through killing. However, his opinion of her seems to change favorably when Wolf betrays her client, a murderer named Albert Chung. Later, after participating in one of Dexter's murders, Miguel realizes he's capable of cold-blooded killings himself, comes to Wolf's house alone and murders her. Wolf was a close friend of Lt. LaGuerta, who is devastated upon Wolf's death. LaGuerta sought to solve the crime, and in the end discovers Miguel's actions. She initially vows to tear what life he left behind apart (Miguel has recently been killed by Dexter, although everyone thought it was the Skinner). However, Dexter makes her understand she would be hurting Prado's family, the local community who supported and admired him and the city at large, and there was no guarantee she would find anything. In the end, LaGuerta accepts Dexter's advice and closes free the case, keeping Prado's actions a secret and saying goodbye to her friend.

==== George King ====
- Jesse Borrego

George "The Skinner" King aka George Washington King, an alias for Jorge "El Fierro" Orozco, was the main antagonist of season 3 along with Miguel Prado. Conscripted into the Nicaraguan army, later he rose to the rank of captain in the Contras, heading an interrogation unit. King tortured and killed people for a living, earning the nickname "The Blade". His time in the army left him with a deep need for respect. King left the army and moved to Miami, founding and becoming the boss of his own tree-trimming company.

When Freebo, a petty criminal, disappears (killed by Dexter) while in debt to King, he resolves to hunt him down and make him pay for his affront, though Dexter sees this as a transparent excuse for his own sociopathic needs. As Debra Morgan meets with Freebo's old associates in an attempt to find him, King trails her, covertly watching their homes under the cover of trimming their trees, and eventually kidnaps each of them, tortures them for information and kills them, taking a patch of skin from each victim, for which he is dubbed "the Skinner".

Upon questioning, he deflects attention to one of his violent employees; but when the employee learns King is involved, he has a near-panic attack, causing the police to focus on King. The police then sets up Anton Briggs, a former confidential informant, as bait by making him seem to know where Freebo is. King kidnaps and tortures Briggs, but Debra and Quinn interrupt, saving Briggs's life and forcing King to flee.

The man-hunt continues, escalating when Dexter frames him for ADA Miguel Prado's death (in reality by his own hands), but Dexter is ultimately captured and abducted by King, having been told by Prado that only Dexter knew where Freebo was. Orozco intends to torture and skin Dexter for information, but instead Dexter effectively strips him of his control (by revealing the truth that Freebo is long dead), then breaks free. In a brutal fist-fight, Dexter breaks King's neck, killing him. The police arrive, having tracked down his hideout, but Dexter avoids detection by dropping King's body in front of one of the speeding squad cars, making it look as if the collision caused the death. Getting hit by the car skins his face; Debra jokes that "what goes around comes around".

==== Barbara Gianna ====
- Kristin Dattilo

Barbara Gianna, a detective with Miami Metro Police Department's Vice Division meets Sgt. Batista in season 3 and becomes his girlfriend. According to Vince Masuka, Gianna's a "Wikipedia of perv". She is attacked and beaten by a would-be "john", and Batista has Dexter run her keys for blood and DNA. She meets him when she is working undercover as a hooker and he is a would-be client, and she is initially standoffish when, after she declines to arrest him, he later attempts to woo her. In the beginning of season 4, it is revealed that they have broken up. Angel credits this to their "wanting different things".

=== Additional characters, introduced in season 4 ===
==== Arthur Mitchell ====
- John Lithgow

Arthur Mitchell is the main antagonist of the fourth season. He is an unassuming suburbanite man who has been living a double life as one of America's most prolific and deadly serial killers, dubbed The Trinity Killer by FBI agent Frank Lundy.

==== Christine Hill ====
- Courtney Ford

Christine Hill is a Miami Tribune reporter who meets Joey Quinn at the scene of Lisa Bell's murder. She starts a relationship with Quinn, often seducing classified police information from him, including the Vacation Shootings, and the return of Frank Lundy to Miami. The police use her to help catch the Vacation Murderers. But Christine is the daughter of Arthur Mitchell/Trinity, and is also the shooter of Frank Lundy and Debra. She also reveals that she saw Arthur commit one of his first murders, and she shot Lundy to prevent Arthur's arrest. The police discover the biological connection and arrest her. She does not confess, however, until Mitchell angrily tells her that he wishes she had never been born. Devastated, Hill calls Debra to her apartment and confesses to killing Lundy, begging for forgiveness, but an enraged Debra sobs at the news and then snarls that she will never forgive Hill and that Hill will rot in jail for the rest of her unloved, unwanted life. A completely broken Hill then pulls out a gun as Debra calls in officers to arrest her, and as Debra turns around, Hill sticks the gun into her mouth and shoots herself.

==== Elliot Larson ====
- Rick Peters

Elliot becomes the neighbor of Dexter and Rita, after they move next door following their wedding. Recently having separated from his wife, Kate (portrayed by Marisa Petroro), he's now a single father, and becomes friends with the Morgans, much to Dexter's annoyance. Elliot eventually develops a romantic interest in Rita. During Thanksgiving he shares a kiss with her, as witnessed by Masuka. When Dexter eventually finds out, he responds by knocking Elliot down.

After Rita's death, he is interviewed as a potential witness and suspect, but is cleared. When Dexter is packing up his house, Elliot apologizes to him for kissing Rita. Later, he meets Lumen Pierce while she is staying at Dexter and Rita's now-unoccupied house.

==== Sally Mitchell ====
- Julia Campbell

Sally Mitchell is married to Arthur Mitchell and is the mother of Jonah and Rebecca Mitchell. In "Dirty Harry" and "If I Had a Hammer" it appears she has an ideal family. The entire family presents as loving, a pillar of the community, church-goers, and involved in a project to build homes for the homeless. However, this is revealed in "Hungry Man" to be a facade; Arthur is controlling and abusive. His wife, fearing her husband, perpetually puts on a cheery facade and is willing to let her daughter continue a perceived affair with Dexter as long as Arthur remains unaware. She is last seen in tears being taken from her home by the police when they uncover that Arthur is Trinity.

Unable to accept the reality of her husband being a veteran serial killer, Sally begins blaming her children for the loss of their lives, hoping Arthur returns to "whisk her away". The blame shifting impacts Rebecca significantly, leading to her suicide, which in turn leads to Jonah beating his mother to death in retribution. The blood spatter indicates that the murderer was someone of Trinity's height, making people believe that Trinity had found and killed them when, in reality, Jonah killed his mother standing on the stairs to seem the same height as his father.

==== Jonah Mitchell ====
- Brando Eaton

Jonah Mitchell is the son and oldest child of Arthur and Sally. He is a member of JROTC, plays football and at one time played baseball for his high school, which he quit, angering his father greatly. Though at first they seem to have a great father/son relationship, it is soon revealed that his father is domineering to him and physically abusive, going as far as to break his fingers for damaging Arthur's car (a white 1968 GT-500 Shelby Mustang convertible with a blue racing stripe). Jonah tells Dexter he always comes up with excuses to explain the injuries given by his father to the school, but due to the number of injuries, is running out of excuses. He later snaps during Thanksgiving dinner and destroys his father's awards as well as smashing Arthur's sister's urn, causing him to nearly kill Jonah by strangulation but he is saved by Dexter. When Dexter is trying to find a child Arthur kidnapped, Jonah goes on Arthur's computer, discovering his father has been looking up vacant houses (although he does not know Arthur's intent for doing so). In the season 4 finale, he is seen being removed from his home by the police when they uncover that Arthur is Trinity.

In season 5, he is seen in a store where Quinn approaches him with a composite sketch of Kyle Butler which resembles Dexter. Before Jonah can give him an answer of whether the picture is Kyle Butler/Dexter or not, Quinn is taken into custody by an FBI agent in charge of guarding Jonah while in witness protection.

In season 6, he reappears in the episode "Nebraska" as the sole survivor of his family who has been reportedly murdered by the Trinity Killer. While Dexter suspects that Jonah was the perpetrator, with supporting evidence, Jonah's guilt emerges in a confrontation which shows that he killed his mother for instigating his sister's suicide. No longer truly fitting the Code of Harry, Dexter tells him to forgive himself and returns to Miami.

==== Rebecca Mitchell ====
- Vanessa Marano

Rebecca Mitchell is the daughter of Arthur and Sally. Though she is a 15-year-old teenager, her bedroom resembles that of a young child. After running away once, Arthur now has locks on the outside of the door and on the windows. Arthur often calls her "Vera", the name of his deceased sister. When Dexter asks her about this and tries to console her, she asks him to take her away, saying she would do "anything", implying she will give him sexual favors to do so (which Dexter flatly refuses). Both Becca and her mother believe he will take Becca up on her offer, however, the latter hopes that Dexter will not allow Arthur to find out. She is last seen in tears being removed from her home by the police when they uncover that Arthur is Trinity.

A year later, due to the unstable rantings of her mother, Rebecca kills herself in a way similar to the second victim in her father's cycle of kills (bleeding out in a bathtub). This discovery prompts Dexter to investigate.

=== Additional characters, introduced in season 5 ===
==== Lumen Pierce ====
- Julia Stiles

Lumen Pierce is first seen after witnessing Dexter kill Boyd Fowler, a serial killer who had been keeping her captive. Despite Lumen being a witness to the murder and a clear threat to Dexter, due to her not fitting Dexter's code by being innocent, he is morally obligated to keep her alive and locks her up in a secluded area to give himself time to decide what to do with her. At first, Lumen is petrified of Dexter, believing that he will kill her for being a witness to his crime. Despite Dexter's constant assurances that he will not kill her, Lumen refuses to trust him. After an escape attempt, she is once again captured by Dexter. Instead of imprisoning her again, Dexter shows Lumen the bodies of Boyd Fowler's previous victims, and assures her that, had he not killed Boyd, she would have been next. It is at this point that Lumen confides in Dexter and tells him that Boyd was not the only one who hurt her. It is ultimately revealed that she had been held captive for an unknown amount of time, during which she was repeatedly raped and tortured by a group of five men.

Her mentally scarring experience has left her with a desire for vengeance, and she attempts to enlist Dexter's help to hunt down and kill the remaining perpetrators. He is willing to do this for her, but suggests that she get on with her life and leave Miami. Upon breaking into her motel room, Dexter discovers that she has been attempting to track down the group of men who raped and tortured her. He learns that she has gone to kill a sex offender whom Dexter, having hunted him down earlier, knows to have been wearing a tracking anklet. He stops her in time and this leads Lumen to realize she does not possess the skills or experience to discover the identities of the men who tortured and raped her and kill them. However, finding herself unable to leave Miami, she shoots Dan Mendell, a man she suspects of being one of her abusers, due to recognizing his distinctive smell. When the man escapes after being shot once in the leg, Lumen calls Dexter, who helps track down the wounded criminal, albeit reluctantly, and cautions her about killing the wrong person. Protesting innocence at first, Mendell calls his co-conspirators on Lumen's cell phone, confirming her suspicion and prompting Dexter to kill him by snapping his neck. They later meet at Dexter's house, where Lumen reveals that his death brought her a sense of peace, stating that the only way she will be able to find that peace again is to kill all of her other abusers. Dexter recognizes this as being her own "dark passenger", and agrees to help her.

Lumen turns up at the crime scene where Boyd's stocked and preserved bodies have been discovered following a traffic crash, where she is spotted by Quinn, who asks Liddy to investigate her connection to Dexter. She identifies Cole Harmon, Jordan Chase's head of security, as one of her torturers, and manages to save Dexter from a surprise attack by Cole when Dexter attempts to gather information from Cole's house. Setting up base at the hotel where Jordan Chase is giving his seminar, Lumen assists Dexter in preparing for the kill. Cole spots her in the lobby and gives chase, with Dexter barely managing to save her from Cole. Unable to extract any information from Cole, she watches while Dexter kills him. They then dispose of the body by dumping it in the ocean from Dexter's boat, and Liddy is seen photographing them.

After the police uncover DVDs of the men torturing and raping female victims, Dexter switches Lumen's DVD with a blank DVD, which he scratches in order to avoid suspicion as to why it was blank. Lumen then acknowledges that she knows what a risk he is taking by being with her, and tells him that he has been her only way through the experience. Lumen proves instrumental in getting information from Emily Birch, the first victim of Chase's team and the only other known survivor. Tilden is Lumen's first kill, as Dexter allows her to make the killing blow at her request. The two then return to Dexter's apartment, where they have sex.

Lumen and Dexter begin to plan how they will capture Chase when they realize that they are being watched. Once Dexter determines that they are being watched by the police, he attempts to convince Lumen to leave Miami for her own safety. However, Lumen refuses to abandon him, and Dexter ultimately admits that he wants her to stay. After receiving a distressed call from Emily, who says Chase contacted and threatened her, Lumen goes to her house to reassure her, having been unable to contact Dexter. This was a trap meant for her and Dexter, however, and Jordan Chase murders Emily and takes Lumen back to Camp River Jordan, which he owns, and which is the location where each of the victims was originally raped and tortured. Dexter arrives at Emily's house to find that Lumen and Jordan have already left and he is able to tell that Lumen fought, albeit unsuccessfully, and swears that he will not lose her, too. Dexter finds the location of the camp and rescues Lumen, who finally kills Chase. After Lumen and Dexter dispose of Chase's body, she admits to Dexter that she did not think they would be able to pull it off, describing it as a miracle. The next morning, Lumen tearfully reveals to Dexter that her darkness has left and she no longer feels the need to kill. She tells Dexter that she does not want to leave, but has to, because he still feels the need to kill. Dexter ultimately understands, and tells her that she should not be sorry that her darkness has left her, promising her that he will carry her darkness as well as his own. Dexter is devastated by her departure, but swears that he will be thankful for what she gave him, and notes that Lumen is the only person whose life has been made better by discovering his secret "true" self (i.e., that he is a serial killer).

==== Cira Manzon ====
- April Hernandez

Cira Manzon is a young Hispanic police officer that gets assigned to the Santa Muerte murders investigation. Debra accepts her to the team mainly due to her knowledge of the neighborhood plagued by the Santa Muerte killings. She quickly proves competent and a valuable addition to the force, despite being somewhat of a rookie and having a hard time handling some of the more gruesome murder scenes. While she has no trouble being accepted by her new colleagues, her optimistic outlook makes her somewhat an odd bird at the Miami Metro PD.

When an attempt to arrest the Fuentes brothers at Club Mayan gets their informant killed because of LaGuerta's bad judgment call, LaGuerta plans to use Manzon as a scapegoat for having a sidearm on her during the botched sting operation, but Debra fiercely defends her by asking LaGuerta to "stick together" rather than pinning the blame on someone else. However, Manzon backs LaGuerta's version of the story, blaming the incident on Debra alone and thus betraying Debra's trust. Manzon is rewarded with a sudden transfer to the homicide division – leaving Debra, the enraged scapegoat, working in the dreary file room.

==== Jordan Chase ====
- Jonny Lee Miller

Jordan Chase (birth name Eugene Greer), is an intelligent and well known and highly regarded author, a motivational speaker, and the main antagonist of season 5 along with Stan Liddy. His book Take It Now is an international bestseller, and Vince Masuka counts himself among Chase's most loyal fans. Alongside his books, Chase is also famous for his audiotapes and seminars, encouraging people to "take what they think they deserve". In private, Chase is actually a misogynistic, misanthropic, and cynical person who uses his words to encourage people to act out their frustrations. He was obese as a teenager, a fact which caused Dexter and Lumen to misidentify him in a picture of the 'Barrel Girl gang' as teenagers.

When Dexter and Lumen start tracking down the members of a secret circle of men responsible for the rape, torture and murder of several young women, they come to suspect that Chase is a part of it. They are eventually proven right, and that he is the driving force within the circle. Even though Chase never participated in any actual rape or killing, he cheered on and commanded his followers, watching and videotaping them as they brutally raped and tortured their victims, delighting in mocking and tormenting Lumen and the other victims.

Dexter approaches Chase, claiming to seek counseling for his grief over Rita's death, Chase eventually figures out Dexter. He responds by sending a message, through Lumen, that not only does he know about Dexter's motive for having contacted him, but he is also aware of Lumen's identity as the circle's escaped victim. With this, he enters the police station giving his DNA voluntarily (as he never touched them, only commanding and cheering-on the others), and begins planning to destroy Dexter. He allows Emily Birch to identify the last attacker, Alex Tilden, knowing that Dexter and Lumen would execute him, planning to set them up to the police. However, they escape as they moved Alex to another house before killing him, with the police finding the house empty.

In another attempt to catch Dexter and Lumen, Chase has Emily call Lumen to convince her and Dexter to come to her house, planning to kill all three of them to cover his tracks. However, only Lumen shows up, which sends Jordan into a rage. While he is screaming at Lumen, Emily tries to defend her, and Chase kills her with a fireplace poker. There is an off-screen scuffle between Lumen and Jordan in which he stuffs her into the trunk of his car. He then drives her to an abandoned summer camp he owns outside of town (under the name Eugene Greer, presumably to avoid suspicion), which is the location each of the gang's victims (including Lumen) had been raped and tortured. Dexter eventually arrives, and is subdued by Chase. He takes Dexter into the basement where Lumen is, and inspects Dexter's kill tools. He notices one knife is missing, which Dexter hid and uses to stab Jordan in the foot and subdue him. As Chase is restrained, he mocks Dexter's belief that killing him will atone for failing Rita. He also takes credit for the new strength in Lumen, claiming that he allowed her to discover it. He then taunts her by reminding her of the pain she suffered the last time she was in the room, and an enraged Lumen stabs him in the heart. As he is dying, she tells him, "That's not just for me, that's for everyone you've hurt, even Emily".

==== Sonya ====
- Maria Doyle Kennedy

Sonya becomes Harrison's nanny after Rita's death. In most of the episodes, she mainly takes care of the infant and offers her opinion of his development. She appears a warm and gentle woman, originating from Ireland, and a devoted Catholic. A former hospital nurse, Sonya explains that she was let go due to budget cuts, and therefore is more than happy to become Harrison's nanny. After some initial arguing over Dexter's parenting and tendency to, from Sonya's point-of-view, put his work before his son, she decides to quit working for him. Much thanks to Sonya's love for Harrison, Dexter is able to convince her to return, and he begins to appreciate her religious insight even if he does not share it. During his final pursuit of Jordan Chase, Dexter arranges for Sonya to take Harrison to the Bennetts to be with his brother and sister for a while, in order to ensure that Harrison is not caught in the crossfire if Jordan tries to attack him directly. She does not appear in later seasons; Dexter has since hired Angel's sister as his nanny, but no explicit information is given about the reason for her dismissal.

==== Stan Liddy ====
- Peter Weller

Stanley "Stan" Liddy is a corrupt narcotics cop, under investigation by Internals Affairs detective Jim McCord, with help from LaGuerta and the main antagonist of season 5 along with Jordan Chase. Quinn hires Liddy to look into Dexter's past. Liddy discovers Lumen and takes pictures of Dexter and Lumen disposing of Cole Harmon's body, though he is not sure what was in the bags. Liddy, assuming the bags to contain either drugs or a dead body, attempts to report to Quinn, but Quinn ends the investigation as his feelings for Debra now have become serious. Liddy refuses to stop, believing he has stumbled upon criminal activity that he can use to reintegrate himself in the police force. After Dexter realizes he's being watched, Liddy sets a trap in his van and manages to apprehend Dexter. Having phoned Quinn, ordering him to come to the van's location, Liddy attempts to force a confession from Dexter in order to regain Liddy's reputation and status as a police officer. However, Dexter manages to fight back and in a short struggle, kills Liddy with his own knife in self-defense. When Quinn arrives at the van, he tries calling Liddy and shortly walks away, but not before a drop of Liddy's blood drops onto his shoe. Dexter then disposes of Liddy's evidence. The police find Liddy's body, and Quinn is considered a suspect, due to Liddy frequently calling him and the blood on his shoe. Quinn refuses to say what the nature of their relationship was, likely to protect Debra. Realizing how much Quinn means to Debra, Dexter sabotages the blood test, making it appear that it was not Liddy's blood on Quinn's shoe, clearing him. Quinn later thanks Dexter for this, although Dexter pretends to not know what Quinn is talking about.

=== Additional characters, introduced in season 6 ===
==== Brother Sam ====
- Mos Def

Brother Samuel "Sam" Wright is a born again Christian and a reformed criminal who runs an auto-body shop in Miami where he tries to extend his good luck to other ex-convicts by giving them a place to work. While Dexter is skeptical of his reformation, Brother Sam proves himself redeemed and Dexter befriends him, introducing him to Harrison.

At the end of the fifth episode, Brother Sam is shot in his garage by Nick, an ex-gang member who wishes to return to the gang. On his deathbed, Sam tells an angry Dexter to forgive Nick for shooting him.

==== Travis Marshall ====
- Colin Hanks

Travis Marshall is a researcher in artifacts, professionally a bible restorer who is tied to the Doomsday Killings (DDK, also standing for "Doomsday Killer") and the main antagonist of season 6. He is in fact directly involved in these murders, with mentor Professor James Gellar passing on his legacy to his student, making him believe that every murder committed is justified. However, his empathic nature leads to him coming in conflict with Gellar's demands. Travis has a sister, Lisa (Molly Parker), a teacher, who tells her students that he is a talented artist.

As the season progresses, particularly after his encounter with Dexter, Travis begins to feel guilty about the suffering of their victims despite Gellar's insistence that the victims are sinners and their deaths are necessary. When told to brand their "Whore of Babylon" he relents to her suffering and releases her, which leads to the police looking for an accomplice. He also leaves Gellar and returns to live with his sister, though Gellar continues to stalk him. When the police department begin researching possible accomplices, his sister answers Debra's house call. Dexter also attempts to recruit Travis before the police find him, which Travis refuses in fear of Gellar. Deciding he has waited long enough, Gellar brands Lisa as the Whore and kidnaps Travis, chaining him at their base. Dexter tracks down their headquarters, but Gellar escapes. Travis pledges allegiance to Dexter in vengeance.

Dexter stashes Travis away while he hunts for Gellar; Gellar somehow finds him and paints a message to repent on the bathroom wall, which Travis tells Dexter is a message to meet. On arrival, Gellar reprimands Travis and allows him to return, though he knocks him unconscious. When Dexter enters, he attempts to locate Gellar but instead finds Gellar's frozen long-dead body. Dexter concludes that Travis has been seeing hallucinations of Gellar and has a mental disorder. This is later confirmed when Travis's prescription for anti-psychotic medication is found in the church.

When faced with the body of Gellar, Travis resolves to "finish what they started", seeking new acolytes in the Dorseys to complete the tableau of "Wormwood", a poison gas attack. He also is determined to locate Holly Benson, the first Whore, and kills her. While hiding with Beth Dorsey, Travis detains a lone Sergeant Batista, and sends Beth with Wormwood to attack Miami Metro, which Dexter narrowly averts.

While falling for a trap Dexter sets, the side-effects of the gas's components disorients Dexter which allows Travis to defeat him, completing his "Lake of Fire" tableau in the ocean.

In the season finale, Travis, believing Dexter to be dead, prepares for his final ascension into Heaven by completing the last of his tableaus during a solar eclipse. Hiding in Dexter's empty apartment, Travis learns of Harrison, and as the final sacrifice requires the death of an innocent, Travis kidnaps Harrison at his Catholic school's Sunday pageant and attempts to kill him atop the Miami Transcorp Building. In the midst of his ritual, Travis is halted by the reappearance of Dexter who proceeds to bargain his life for Harrison's. As Travis believes Dexter to be the embodiment of The Beast and values his death above all others, he agrees to release Harrison but not before demanding that Dexter inject himself with some of his tranquilizers to render himself unconscious. Unbeknownst to Travis, Dexter, having anticipated his demands, plays possum and manages to overpower DDK, knocking him out during their ensuing struggle. After dropping Harrison back home, Dexter brings Travis back to the abandoned church, and after a heated debate concerning the existence of God, Travis screams that it is not God's Will that he is to die by Dexter's hand, with Dexter concluding that things are exactly the way they are supposed to be. Dexter then stabs DDK in full view of his sister Debra, who had walked into the church at the exact moment Dexter murdered Travis.

At the beginning of season 7, Debra and Dexter burn Travis' body to make it appear a suicide. By the end of season 7, Capt. LaGuerta uses the circumstances of Travis Marshall's death and the fact that she found his blood slide to conclude that Dexter is the Bay Harbor Butcher.

In Dexter: Resurrection, Travis is one of the serial killers represented in Leon Prater's vault, having obtained the sword that he used in the murders. Joey Quinn later calls Travis one of the "all-star lineup of Miami killers" represented in the vault alongside the Ice Truck Killer and the Bay Harbor Butcher.

==== James Gellar ====
- Edward James Olmos

Professor James Gellar is a former religious studies teacher at the University of Tallahassee, erroneously fired for stealing an ancient Roman sword which belonged to John the Revelator. Gellar had since then gone underground and was unheard of until the Doomsday Killings. Gellar has a blog, which has a cult following; it is dedicated to explaining the End Time as described in the Book of Revelation. With time, Gellar became consumed in recreating these scenes with his apprentice, Travis Marshall, acting as the two witnesses. The first three killings are successful, but Gellar's callous treatment of his victims leads to Travis releasing their Whore and leaving him. Gellar continues to stalk Travis and his sister Lisa, and upon seeing her talk to Deb, he kills her in the playground as the Whore of Babylon, kidnapping Travis when he arrives. Chaining him in the headquarters, he berates him before branding him with an iron. Upon Dexter's arrival, Gellar is able to escape while observing Dexter.

Working alone, Gellar tracks down the devoutly atheist Professor Casey, whom he sees as a false prophet and disembowels to serve as the seven bowls; he uses Casey's hand to paint a message for Travis in blood. Travis tells Dexter that he posted on his blog telling him to meet, where an angry Gellar tells Travis to repent, before knocking him unconscious. As Dexter searches the church for clues, he discovers an opening that leads to a basement. In that basement, Dexter is shocked upon seeing Gellar's dead body in a freezer, concluding that Travis was acting alone the entire time. In reality, Travis was the one who stole the sword three years prior to the doomsday killings, incriminated Gellar and came up with the gruesome idea to act out the End of Days. Gellar called Travis on his delusions and advised him to seek professional help, but instead, Travis stabbed Gellar multiple times to "prove" their immortality. Refusing to grasp reality, Travis stored Gellar's body in the freezer, keeping him alive in his delusions, until Dexter's discovery forced Travis to accept Gellar's death and move on to find new disciples.

==== Mike Anderson ====
- Billy Brown

Michael "Mike" Anderson is hired by Deb as her replacement on the detective squad after she is promoted to lieutenant. Transferring in from Chicago, he initially causes friction by believing Debra is only pranking him when she introduces herself as lieutenant, which Debra dismisses to maintain her composure. He, however, begins to mesh well with the team, noting on Dexter's incredible deductive skill in bloodwork and leading the religious research division of the Doomsday Killings when he notes the religious significance of the "tableaux" as he dubs them.

He is murdered in the first episode of season 7 by Viktor Baskov.

==== Ryan Chambers ====
- Brea Grant

Ryan Chambers is a forensic intern and newcomer to the Forensics department in Miami Metro Homicide in season 6. She attends the university Vince Masuka teaches a class for in Forensic studies. Originally a fellow student, Peter, was chosen in favor for an internship with Vince, as he placed the highest test scores. However, later on when Omar Rivera's body was found, Peter faints at the scene, and Vince immediately replaces him with Ryan. She works alongside Vince Masuka during the Doomsday Killings acting as both his partner in the case and understudy, and slowly forms a relationship with him. Vince works up the courage to ask her out on a date, and Ryan agrees.

Ryan has a fascination with the buried Ice Truck Killer case; Masuka eventually brings up the evidence from the investigation for her to look through as a sort of gift. She expresses her fascination with the case, having followed it since the details were made public. A mannequin arm left in the evidence box is later stolen by her and sold on the internet because she needs money for rent. The breach of trust led to Vince replacing her with Louis Greene, leaving Vince quite sore about it.

==== Louis Greene ====
- Josh Cooke

Louis Greene is the third intern in Miami Metro PD's forensics department, replacing Ryan. He is a computer genius, whose expertise leads to critical breaks in the Doomsday Killer case. Louis falls for Detective Batista's sister, Jamie, and reveals he is well off due to his side-gig of developing video games. Louis is developing a video game based on serial killers, and seeking Dexter's approval, shows him the game, much to Dexter's disgust. He sends the Ice Truck Killer's hand to Dexter's home, and tries to destroy Dexter for discouraging his video game. Dexter warns him to leave his life, to which Louis refuses. Dexter gets him fired and broken up with by Jamie by mailing the hand to Vince and a video of Louis having sex with a hooker to Jamie, leading Louis to attempt to sabotage Dexter's boat. In the process, he ends up getting killed in a mix up with Isaak Sirko.

=== Additional characters, introduced in season 7 ===
==== Hannah McKay ====
- Yvonne Strahovski

Hannah McKay was a fifteen-year-old from Clopton, Alabama when her boyfriend Wayne Randall commenced a three-state killing spree. She spent six years in Juvenile detention after pleading guilty to being an accomplice. She claimed not to have actually committed any crimes and received immunity from prosecution after agreeing to testify against Randall.

She married a man in his forties, but poisoned him when he pressed her to have an abortion, later claiming she wanted to have the child. She inherited her gardening business from her mentor, whom she is later suspected of poisoning with aconitum.

When Randall decides to reveal where the last of his victims were buried, Miami Metro Homicide wants a DNA sample from her. Dexter is assigned to get the sample and he seems infatuated with her, becoming uncharacteristically distracted in his work.

After Randall kills himself, she assists in locating the remaining bodies. After uncovering the bodies of a couple Wayne killed, Dexter realizes Hannah's story isn't truthful. While on a date, Dexter takes Hannah to a closed Christmas-themed amusement park, where it turns out Dexter has a kill room set up. He prepares to kill Hannah, but cannot go through with it and releases her. They end up having sex in the kill room instead.

When Sal Price, an investigative true-crime writer who has written a book about Wayne Randall, wants to write a sequel about her, she agrees to an interview. She admits to stabbing the woman at the hotel. She poisons Price, who later collapses and dies in Dexter's apartment. Furious over Sal's death, and knowing that Hannah had confessed to him, Debra calls Hannah in for questioning. Debra has little proof against Hannah and instead baits her with information about a miscarriage. Dexter realizes that Hannah is showing sincere emotion - this isn't an act. Dexter later confronts Hannah at her home, telling her that Price's death was needless. Hannah is touched to learn of Dexter's deleting of Price's files. The two later sleep together.

Realizing that Hannah is unpunished for killing Price the next day and angry that she has got away again, Debra Morgan calls Dexter and asks him to kill her, surprising Dexter. He refuses, trying to make it look like because there's no proof, he cannot do it, disappointing Debra. Hannah would later be visited by Debra who warns Hannah that she won't get away with this. As Hannah tries to apologize, Debra says she hasn't even begun to be sorry, worrying Hannah.

Hannah falls foul of Dexter by poisoning Debra. Hannah tried to form a truce with Deb but she declined. She spiked Debra's drinking water, causing her to pass out while driving. Dexter later gives Deb evidence to prove Hannah poisoned Price. Debra has Hannah arrested.

Dexter visits Hannah in prison. She admits to poisoning Debra because she tried to separate her from Dexter. Dexter tells her he had no choice but turn her in because he doesn't want anything to happen to his sister. Hannah assures Dexter that she won't tell his secret when she goes to trial. Dexter and Hannah share a passionate kiss before Hannah bites Dexter's lip as a sort of revenge for everything that has happened. Before she stands trial, she is confronted by Debra Morgan. Hannah plans to plead "not guilty" and that she will confess her crimes when Deb confesses hers. Debra tells Hannah her conscience is clean, to which Hannah replies that she is lieutenant of Miami Metro Homicide but still knows about Dexter's secret, asking her how she can bring her to justice but not Dexter. During Hannah's arraignment on murder charges, Arlene slips Hannah a substance that causes a seizure. Hannah is taken to the hospital and escapes. She leaves a black orchid on Dexter's doorstep.

In season 8, on a visit to his sister, Dexter and Debra both feel as if they have been drugged; just before he passes out, Dexter sees Hannah standing over him. When he later regains consciousness, Dexter begins investigating Hannah, and finds that she has changed her name and married Miles Castner (Julian Sands), a wealthy businessman. Dexter goes to see Hannah, who says that she had wanted him to kill Castner, but changed her mind after realizing she is still in love with Dexter. Castner warns him to stay away from Hannah, and has him beaten up. Dexter goes to Castner's boat to protect Hannah, but finds that she has already killed him. The two of them dispose of the body, and promise to watch out for each other. The two end up having sex and rekindling their relationship.

Hannah and Dexter make plans to flee to Argentina but with the forces closing in on them, Dexter sends her and his son Harrison towards Jacksonville and from there they fly to Buenos Aires. She later reads of Dexter's boat sinking due to a hurricane and assumes that Dexter has died. She becomes guardian of Harrison, practically adopting her "deceased" lover's (and killer accomplice) son.

In Dexter: New Blood, a teenage Harrison reveals to Dexter that Hannah had eventually died of cancer three years before. After her death, Harrison found a letter that Dexter had written to Hannah revealing his survival and allowing Harrison to track him down.

In Dexter: Resurrection, Hannah reappears in a flashback as Dexter and Harrison prepare to attend Prudence Kamara's wake. Harrison tells his father that he had to attend Hannah's funeral alone and that Harrison has never felt more alone than after she died. Dexter reassures his son that both of his mothers, Rita and Hannah, would be proud of Harrison.

==== Isaak Sirko ====
- Ray Stevenson

Isaak Sirko, nicknamed Volk which means Wolf in Ukrainian. He is a high-ranking member of the Koshka Brotherhood, a Ukrainian-based international crime syndicate with operations in Miami, and one of the main antagonists in season 7. After the disappearance of Viktor Baskov, one of Isaak's top subordinates and secretly his lover, Isaak travels to Miami, accompanied by his bodyguard and right-hand man, Jurg Yeliashkevych, in order to investigate Viktor's vanishing. Upon realizing that Viktor was killed, he tries to avenge him. His trail leads him to Dexter's boat, the Slice of Life, which Louis Greene was trying to sabotage. Louis tells Isaak that the boat belongs to Dexter Morgan, after which Isaak shoots him. Isaak begins to hunt Dexter, but Dexter quickly becomes wise to it, and lures him into a bar owned by the Koshka Brotherhood's Colombian rivals, the Rojas Cartel. Three armed Colombians attack Isaak, but Isaak shoots and kills them. The evidence leads to Isaak being brought in by Miami Metro and later incarcerated.

Isaak is later released from prison after Joey Quinn, blackmailed by George Novikov, disposes of the DNA evidence linking Sirko to the murder of the three Colombians. Isaak continues to pursue Dexter, which begins to get in the way of the brotherhood's more profitable operations. George sends a hitman after Isaak, who is killed by Dexter. Now aware that he is no longer welcome in the Koshka Brotherhood, Isaak begins operating alone (with Jurg as his sole aide), with his only purpose left in life being to kill Dexter. Two of the Koshka Brotherhood's top hitmen, Oleg Mickic and Benjamin Caffrey, are sent to Miami to kill Isaak. Isaak decides to enlist Dexter's help in killing them, ensuring his cooperation by kidnapping his girlfriend, Hannah McKay.

Dexter eliminates Mickic at a shooting range. After a shootout with Caffrey on a freighter, Isaak is cornered by George Novikov, who shoots Isaak in the gut, but flees at the sight of Dexter. Knowing that his wound is fatal, Isaak asks Dexter to dispose of him in the same place where he disposed of Viktor's body. On the way to Isaak's final resting spot, Isaak and Dexter discuss how Dexter feels like he has no control over his life since he met Hannah. Isaak states that he felt the same way, detached from society and forced to hide a secret, until he met Viktor. With his final breath, Isaak tells Dexter that there is still hope for him.

==== Viktor Baskov ====
- Enver Gjokaj

Viktor Baskov is a member of the Koshka Brotherhood and the head of their operations in America. While in Miami, he killed Detective Mike Anderson after Anderson discovers a dead stripper in Baskov's trunk. He attempts to flee the country afterwards, but is intercepted at Miami International Airport by Dexter. He is Dexter's first kill in season 7. Viktor is Isaak Sirko's lover.

==== George Novikov ====
- Jason Gedrick

George Novikov is the manager of a strip joint, The Fox Hole, owned by the Koshka Brotherhood. Novikov puts pressure on a reluctant Quinn to destroy evidence against Isaak Sirko in a murder case by threatening Nadia's safety. He later informs the Brotherhood of Sirko's erratic behavior and continues to blackmail Quinn so his drug shipment won't be intercepted by police. After the two assassins the brotherhood sent fail to get Sirko, George shoots him himself. He is killed by Quinn in the episode The Dark... Whatever after he physically assaults Nadia twice. Quinn has Nadia help him by shooting him in the arm while the gun is in George's hand, so that the murder can be presented as self-defense, although Quinn's partner Batista quickly sees through the ruse.

==== Jurg Yeliashkevych ====
- Andrew Kirsanov

Jurgen "Jurg" Yeliashkevych is a member of the Koshka Brotherhood and Isaak Sirko's bodyguard. Jurg accompanies Isaak to Miami while the latter is investigating the death of Viktor Baskov. Strong and silent, Jurg is highly loyal to Isaak, remaining by his side even when Isaak is removed from the Koshka Brotherhood. At this time, Jurg assists Isaak in the kidnapping of Hannah McKay, in order to assure the cooperation of Dexter Morgan in killing Oleg Mickic and Benjamin Caffrey. However, while Jurg holds Hannah at the home of Andres Rodriguez, the deceased boss of the Rojas Cartel, Hannah tries to poison Jurg in an attempt to escape. Although the poison is not fatal, it allows Hannah to bash him over the head with a lamp, after which he stabs her in the stomach. Although Hannah's wound is non-fatal, Jurg is killed in the struggle. Hannah is rescued by Debra Morgan and Jurg's death is ruled to be self-defense.

==== Nadia ====
- Katia Winter

Nadezhda, known by her stage name Nadia, is a Ukrainian dancer at a strip club linked to the Koshka Brotherhood, and also the same establishment that employed murdered dancer Kaja Soroka. When Miami Metro focuses its investigation into Det. Mike Anderson's murder on the club, she soon enters a romantic relationship with Quinn. She is aware of and fears the criminal element that runs the club. By threatening Nadia's safety, George Novikov convinces a reluctant Quinn to destroy evidence against Isaak in a murder case. Nadia eventually flees Miami to get work in Las Vegas.

=== Additional characters, introduced in season 8 ===
==== Jacob Elway ====
- Sean Patrick Flanery

Jacob Elway is a former police officer who now owns a large private investigation company. He hires Deb after she quits the police force, on her conditions that she be able to choose the cases she pursues. He later becomes involved in tracking down fugitive Hannah McKay, realizing that Dexter and Deb are helping to hide her. In the series' finale, he is the only living person, apart from Hannah and Dexter, who knows that Dexter's son Harrison Morgan is alive and on the run with Hannah.

==== Evelyn Vogel ====
- Charlotte Rampling

Dr. Evelyn Vogel is a neuro-psychiatrist specializing in psychopaths. She offers the Miami Metro Police help in tracking a serial killer, the "Brain Surgeon," who removes parts of his victims' brains. She knows intricate details of Dexter's lifestyle, revealing to him that she has drawings he made as a child which hint at his psychopathy. She is the co-architect of the Code that Harry taught Dexter, and is quite pleased at the fact that it successfully has kept Dexter alive and well. Dr. Vogel enlists Dexter's help in catching the Brain Surgeon, who has targeted her by leaving pieces of victim's brain at Vogel's house. She also works with Debra when she shows signs of PTSD after María LaGuerta's murder, but is murdered by her estranged son, Daniel / the Brain Surgeon.

==== Zach Hamilton ====
- Sam Underwood

Zachary "Zach" Hamilton is the son of an affluent Miami politician who is suspected of killing a woman. As a patient of Dr. Vogel, she suggests that Dexter teach Zach the "Code of Harry" to which Dexter is initially reluctant, but he realizes that Zach is just like him when he was younger. Zach ends up properly vetting, stalking, and killing a person who had killed before, making Dexter proud that the Code can be passed on — until Zach is killed by the Brain Surgeon.

==== Oliver Saxon ====
- Darri Ingolfsson

Oliver Saxon (birth name Daniel Vogel) is Dr. Vogel's estranged psychopathic son and the main antagonist of the final season. Evelyn Vogel sent him to a mental institution after he killed his brother, and he eventually faked his death and came to Miami under the alias Oliver Saxon, living as a building inspector. He becomes a serial killer known as the "Brain Surgeon"; he removes the anterior insular cortex (the part of the brain that controls empathy) from his victims' brains and leaves them on his mother's doorstep. She asks Dexter to help her track the Brain Surgeon down, unaware of his identity. Dexter unknowingly meets him when Saxon begins dating Dexter's neighbor, Cassie Jollenston. After Saxon murders Jollenston and Dexter's apprentice Zach Hamilton, he realizes his identity. Saxon and Dr. Vogel reunite, but Vogel eventually decides to let Dexter kill him after seeing a videotape of Saxon murdering Zach. Saxon, aware of the plot, slits Vogel's throat, killing her in front of Dexter. Dexter later tracks him down and ties him to a makeshift kill table, but chooses to let Deb hand him over to the police. However, Saxon is freed by a marshal and shoots Deb. Saxon is later killed by Dexter with a pen to his carotid artery in a jail interrogation room.

=== Additional characters, introduced in Dexter: New Blood ===
==== Matt Caldwell ====
- Steve M. Robertson

Matthew "Matt" Caldwell is the son of Kurt Caldwell and a minor antagonist of Dexter: New Blood. He is characterized as immature, irresponsible and reckless. Matt enters the hunting store where Dexter works and tries to purchase a knife and the largest rifle in stock, but is put on hold by the FBI after a mandatory background check. It is revealed at the police station that, years prior, Matt was in a boat crash in which five people died, and that he has a criminal record. That evening at a bar, he invites Dexter to a party on the next day. Dexter decides not to go, but since Matt is no longer in processing, he has to come by and deliver the gun to the party.

At the party, Dexter brings Matt a form to sign, but he is having sex with a woman Matt's friend Bill intended to sleep with. Bill is upset by this, and snorts drugs to "straighten up." It is then when Bill tells the truth about the boat crash: Matt was driving drunk and intentionally rammed into another boat, whose driver had yielded. The next morning, when Dexter is near a white buck, Matt shoots it. He approaches Dexter, who knocks him out with the bottom of his rifle to the head, and decides he will kill Matt.

Dexter prepares a kill room, binds Matt, and takes a makeshift blood slide with two shards of broken glass. They have a conversation in which Matt first tries to make excuses, then warns Dexter that Kurt Caldwell will "rain down a world of pain" onto him. Dexter kills Matt, and decides he does not need trophies anymore and leaves the slide with the body.

==== Teddy Reed ====
- David Magidoff

Teddy Reed is a young and inexperienced new police officer in Iron Lake in Dexter: New Blood. Teddy participates in the search for Matt Caldwell, but breaks a drone while trying to control it. He accompanies Angela Bishop in the search for her deceased friend Iris.

In Dexter: Resurrection, Teddy visits Dexter in the hospital, having become Acting Sheriff of Iron Lake following Angela's departure and Sergeant Logan's murder. He gives Dexter a message from Angela and reveals, much to Dexter's surprise, that he's been cleared of the murders of Logan and Matt Caldwell. To Teddy's relief, Dexter declines to press charges against Angela for shooting him. Angel Batista later enlists Teddy's help in tracking Dexter through his truck from Iron Lake to New York City.

==== Molly Park ====
- Jamie Chung

Molly Park is a true crime podcaster who visits Iron Lake following the disappearance of Matt Caldwell. She is murdered by Kurt Caldwell and has done podcasts on the Trinity Killer and the Bay Harbor Butcher. Her body is later found by Dexter and Harrison Morgan when they uncover Kurt's bunker and Dexter leads Sheriff Angela Bishop to it after killing Kurt.

In Dexter: Resurrection, Dexter listens to Molly's podcast on the Sleepy-Eyed Stranger in "Live Free and Die" before going after the serial killer.

==== Elric ====
- Shuler Hensley

=== Additional characters, introduced in Dexter: Resurrection ===
==== Elsa Rivera ====
- Emilia Suárez

Elsa Rivera is Harrison's friend and coworker at the Empire Hotel. Shs the single mother of her son, Dante. Despite her rejecting a kiss from Harrison, the friendship between Elsa and him does not end.

==== Ronald Schmidt ====
- Marc Menchaca

Ronald "Red" Schmidt is a new serial killer, who lives a very private and secretive lifestyle. He targets rideshare drivers, earning the nickname "the Dark Passenger". This inspires Dexter to target him: Red is eventually caught and killed by him. Dexter discovers an invitation to a gathering of killers in his belongings, and uses Red's identity to infiltrate the group.

==== Joy Kamara ====
- Reese Antoinette

Joy Kamara is Blessing Kamara's daughter who is an acupuncturist. She helps Dexter recover from his injury with her practice. In one of their appointments, he reveals that Blessing was a child soldier in the Revolutionary United Front, which upsets her. Joy's fiancé Sam is a budding entrepreneur.

==== Lowell ====
- Neil Patrick Harris

Lowell is one of the killers of Prater's gathering, known as the "Tattoo Collector" for taking tattooed skin as trophies. He is an anesthesiologist, and is knocked out by Dexter using one of Lowell's own masks. He becomes the first killer of the group to be taken down.

==== Al Walker ====
- Eric Stonestreet

Al Walker is one of the killers of Prater's gathering, known as "Rapunzel" for taking ponytails as trophies. He is a cheery family man with multiple children, but he later explains to Dexter that he considers he owns them. He describes killing as "self-care": taking care of his own needs, and afterwards, those of his family. He becomes the only killer of the group to leave alive, severing ties by destroying the phone given to him by Prater. In season 2, a few years later, he is hunted down in Pennsylvania by Dexter after killing five more women. Dexter manages to kill Al by hanging him with a hoist chain, while his body and his trophies are left for the police to discover.

==== The Gemini Killers ====
- David Dasmalchian

The Gemini Killers are a pair of twins known as a sole "Gemini Killer" for killing in pairs. The two always operate publicly as one person, Gareth, and the two have developed an intricate system of communicating so that they can never be seen together. Their prolificity and success has led them into developing a large ego. Dexter kills one of them after the twin follows him home, and the other by stabbing him in the neck during a gathering, under the guise of self-defense.

==== Mia LaPierre ====
- Krysten Ritter

Mia LaPierre is one of the killers of Prater's gathering, known as "Lady Vengeance" for apparently targeting sexual predators. She initially interests Dexter when he finds out about her targets, thinking she has a code. She reveals she initially sought rapists after the thrill of killing her sister's assailant, but does not truly have a moral compass. Dexter calls the police when she is beginning to torture a victim, and she is arrested. In her prison, she is found dead apparently by suicide, but was in reality killed by a security guard bribed by Charley.

== Minor characters ==
=== Minor characters in season 1 ===
- Michael "Mike" Donovan (Jim Abele) is a 42-year-old pastor and church choir conductor who raped and killed at least three young boys, Corey Balanti, Tyler Kale, and Joe Bigalow. He is Dexter's first victim shown in the series. Dexter chokes him inside his station wagon, forces him to drive to a pump station on the outskirts of Miami, and forces him to look at his victims' bodies. Dexter then kills him with a hand saw, at the site where Donovan had buried several of his victims (whom Dexter exhumes and shows to Donovan shortly before Donovan dies). Donovan's wife comes to the station the next day to report her husband's disappearance. Dexter shows particular anger towards Donovan; it's unclear, at that point, whether it stems from Dexter's having a personal hate for pedophiles or the writers' still finding the character of Dexter. In Darkly Dreaming Dexter, this character is referred to as "Father Donovan", suggesting he is a Catholic priest. There is no mention of him having a family. Unlike the television show, Father Donovan's victims include both boys and girls. Also, he thanks Dexter for killing him, recognising his own "sickness" and grateful for the relief. In the novel, Donovan is killed inside a house and the child victims had been buried in a garden.
- James "Jamie" Jaworski (Ethan Smith) is a 29-year-old hotel valet with a taste for sexual sadism and snuff films. He recorded his rape and murder of Jane Saunders, mother of two small boys, and posted it on the Internet. Jaworski had been formerly arrested but escaped justice due to a faulty search warrant. Dexter, whilst stalking him, notices a red devil tattoo on his arm and identifies him from it in the video on the fetish website. In order to capture him, Dexter lures him with a photo of his latest kill and then sticks a syringe in his neck. When questioned, Jaworski coldly admits that he raped and killed Jane Saunders, and he is not sorry. Dexter kills him at a deserted construction site where Jaworski had been stealing copper pipes to earn extra cash. He is Dexter's second victim on the show. In Darkly Dreaming Dexter, Jaworski works as a janitor who abducts young girls. Frustrated by the Tamiami Slasher case, Dexter kills him sloppily, even forgetting to take a blood sample from him. The Slasher kills his next victim in a similarly messy way as a form of satire.
- Jane Saunders (Neeona Neel) was a mother of two boys. She was raped and killed in a snuff film by Jamie Jaworski. Her children were emotionally devastated after her death, and Dexter avenges her by killing her murderer.
- Carlos Guerrero (Rudolf Martin) is a powerful drug lord responsible for the death of Officer Ricky Simmons and Simmons' wife Kara. Dexter at one point thinks about killing him but decides Guerrero he did not fit the code, and he had just chosen to live in a dangerous world. Sergeant Doakes becomes Guerrero's main target, after accusing him of murder in front of his church and daughter Rose. In an act of retaliation, Guerrero has men tail Doakes in several attempts to scare him off. Guerrero eventually kidnaps Doakes and is ready to execute him when Guerrero is shot by several officers, including Kara's brother Detective McNamara (portrayed by Scott William Winters). It becomes clear that Doakes' colleagues had used him as bait to get to Guerrero—thus getting the evidence they needed to finally having the drug lord convicted.
- Norberto Cervantes (Cristos) is a professional hitman and assassin working for Carlos Guerrero. Norberto is dispatched to kill Officer Ricky Simmons when Carlos discovers Simmons was an undercover cop trying to infiltrate his organization. Norberto did so by throwing him off a freeway overpass, but not before Ricky bites a chunk of flesh from Norberto's arm. Norberto then checks Ricky's phone, and discovers he has been in constant contact with his wife, Kara, and to prevent information from leaking to the police, Norberto goes to the Simmons residence, shooting Kara and departing, but not before his bleeding arm leaves a drop of blood at the scene. When Kara succumbs to her injuries in hospital, her secret lover, Doakes, is driven to investigate harder and soon discovers the DNA trail and arrests Norberto. LaGuerta offers Norberto a more lenient sentence in exchange for providing enough evidence to bring down Guerrero, and he seriously considers this, but somehow Guerrero has learns of this, and arranges for another one of his assassins, a paid off prison guard, to bring Norberto to the prison's showers, where he stabs Norberto to death. The death is blamed on an unnamed prisoner.
- Kara Simmons (Maureen Moldoon) is the wife of Ricky Simmons. Evidently, she becomes unhappy with her relationship with Ricky and becomes unfaithful to him by sleeping with Sergeant James Doakes. After her husband is shot for working undercover, Carlos Guerrero sends a man, Norberto Cervantes, to their house and shoots her in the stomach, and she tries to call her husband during the attack. Soon after, María LaGuerta and James Doakes arrive on the scene to find her wound. James Doakes becomes concerned with her recovery and stays by her side while she is in hospital, to the suspicion of LaGuerta, who later confronts him with her theory that he is sleeping with her, to which he admits that he was. Doakes is shown to be upset and vengeful regarding Kara's death.
- Matthew "Matt" Chambers (Sam Trammell), also known as Matt Brewster and Matt Rasmussen, is a 35-year-old alcoholic. Dexter first learns of him in court by noticing the crying family of his latest victim, Alexander Pryce (18). Chambers uses his AA sponsor to vouch for his false recovery and he is found not guilty due to a mask of emotions that instill empathy and sympathy from people, where only Dexter could see his emotions were completely fake. Matt is a repeat drunk driver, who has killed and crippled several people, yet shows no remorse or guilt for his crimes, the people he has killed and severely injured while driving drunk, and the horrible way his actions effected all those who loved his victims. Whenever he kills or injures someone in a drunk driving, he changes his name and moves to a new city. Dexter kills him in an abandoned liquor store.
- Sean (Richard Gunn) is a mechanic and temporary boyfriend of Debra's. Dexter and Rita double date with them and Debra gets on well with him, but he turns out to be married and after Debra discovers that he was using her as a bit on the side, she dumps him. He plays a part in making Dexter's relationship with Rita uncomfortable as she notes that they get on well with each other and that she and Dexter do not have the same fluency in their relationship.
- Shanda (Lizette Carrión) becomes friends with Debra during Deb's undercover work as a prostitute. Shanda, being a street prostitute herself, becomes a helpful resource in the Miami Metro PD's hunt for the Ice Truck Killer.
- Jeremy Downs (Mark L. Young) is a 19-year-old boy living in a halfway house after he is released from juvenile hall. At the age of fifteen, he was convicted for killing another boy. Dexter attempts to kill him, but lets him go after learning that his victim raped him. Before leaving, he encourages Jeremy to only kill those who deserve to die. After Jeremy kills a second innocent boy, Doakes arrests Jeremy. While he is detained, Dexter talks to Jeremy, who revealed to Dexter that the trauma from the rape has left him just like Dexter, "empty", and he kills to feel something—although he does admit that it does not help, and in fact makes the feeling worse. Dexter later visits Jeremy in prison, as he is the only one who can understand him, and vice versa, but finds Jeremy had killed himself.
- Nurse Mary (Denise Crosby in Dexter, Tanya Clarke in Original Sin) is Dexter's first victim, as seen in a flashback. She was a nurse who overmedicated her patients with morphine (potassium nitrate in Dexter: Original Sin) who eventually died from overdose. Dexter incapacitates her with a syringe, which is where he obtains his syringe technique. She believes that she is helping her victims by "ending their pain", and keeps an album containing their obituaries. Harry Morgan almost becomes one of her victims when he has a heart attack and is placed in her care. Harry gives Dexter 'permission' to kill her and he ambushes her at her house. Her victims were Phoebe Burns, Jason Kheel, David Nammers among others. Dexter gives her the nickname "First Nurse" in the series, although in the novels her nickname is "Last Nurse". In the novels, the nurse is basically the same as in the TV series. However, her motivation for killing her patients is never given in the novels. She is speculated to have been inspired by prolific serial killer Harold Shipman.
- Anthony "Tony" Tucci (Brad William Henke) is a security guard in an ice skating rink. LaGuerta initially thinks that Tucci is the Ice Truck Killer, and puts out a warrant for his arrest —one quickly rescinded when the real killer kidnaps him. The killer amputates Tucci's left arm and right leg, Dexter realising that Tucci is still alive based on the blood flow in the severed limbs being unaltered- and leaves them as clues for Dexter to find, choosing locations that Dexter visited with Harry based on photographs in one of his albums. The killer eventually leaves Tucci in an abandoned hospital for Dexter to find, as a sort of invitation to kill him. He fails to meet Dexter's code, however, and Dexter sends Debra an anonymous tip leading her to the hospital and Tucci. Because of LaGuerta's rash decision to brand him as the Ice Truck Killer, this (along with a few other rash decisions) led her to be demoted.
- Mrs. Tucci (Gina Hecht) is Tony Tucci's mother. She is inconvenienced by Lieutenant María LaGuerta's false accusation of her son, followed by learning of his kidnapping. María is forced to apologize to her by Captain Matthews, but she is thankful rather than displeased that she came in person. Throughout the time her son is kidnapped, she prays almost non-stop and towards the end of the episode reminds María of her faith.
- Nina Batista (Angela Alvarado Rosa) is Angel's ex-wife. The couple separated some months prior to the series premiere, following Angel having an affair with another woman. Despite Angel's attempts to get Nina back, she constantly turns him down. However, as seen following Angel's nearly fatal confrontation with the Ice Truck Killer, Nina still cares a lot for her former spouse. Even so, neither Nina, nor the couples' daughter Auri, has been seen or referred to following the end of the first season.
- Neil Perry (Sam Witwer) is a brilliant but disturbed computer analyst with a compulsion to kill animals. Neil was regularly abused by his mother, but never struck back; only when she died of a heart attack did he finally lash out, mutilate and bury her corpse outside his trailer home. Neil began to see the chance for fame during the Ice Truck Killer case, using his own skills to hack into the police database and read the newspapers. Eventually, he sets himself up as the killer, kidnapping a prostitute in a fake attempt to kill her, possessing photographs of the corpses not released to the public, allowing his mother's corpse to be discovered, and readily confessing to the murders. While in prison awaiting trial, Dexter, who has been contacted by the true Ice Truck Killer, realizes Neil is a fraud when Neil fails to recognize him. Despite Dexter and LaGuerta's insistence, Captain Matthews refuses to acknowledge the possibility that they may have the wrong man, and publicly announces Neil's identity as the Ice Truck Killer. Dexter's subtle manipulation eventually drives LaGuerta into investigating Neil's innocence, and she soon realizes that he found the information in the database, though the Captain and District Attorney continue to refuse to release him. LaGuerta appears to deliberately fail to convince the Captain of Perry's innocence as a scheme to undermine him. Later on, the Ice Truck Killer pours the collected blood of several of his victims in a hotel room. Shortly after its discovery, the blood is matched to the drained victims by DNA, proving Neil's innocence to the police and leading to his release. LaGuerta undermining the Captain by publicly stating Neil's innocence behind his back is the final straw that causes her to be demoted.
- Jorge and Valerie Castillo (José Zúñiga and Valerie Dillman) are a husband-and-wife team of human traffickers (though only one of them is officially known about) who would transport illegal immigrants from Cuba. If an immigrant cannot pay an additional fee, he or she is locked up in Jorge's auto yard, taken out on Jorge's boat and drowned. Dexter kills them both, but not before getting relationship advice out of them. Shortly after Dexter dumps their bodies, the Ice Truck Killer dives into the ocean and places Valerie's corpse (which Dexter did not have time to dismember) in the auto yard, where it is discovered by the police, almost leading to Dexter's capture until he manages to find a way to cast doubt on the evidence.
- Oscar (Cesar Flores) is a Cuban child immigrant who is found inside the trunk of a car in Jorge and Valerie Castillo' autoyard. He witnesses Dexter injecting his captors and taking them away from the keyhole in the car. After this, he develops attachment issues, trusting only María LaGuerta, who in turn develops maternal feelings for him. When asked to describe the killer by a sketch artist for a facial composite, he describes a man with facial features similar to Jesus Christ, thus saving Dexter from being caught. He is then put in his uncle's care.
- Cindy Landon (Julie Dolan) is a black widow who appears in a flashback. Her only line is "I'll fuck you if you let me go." She is the focus of an episode of Dexter: Early Cuts. She is a freelance magician's assistant who marries men and kills them for their money.
- Eugene "Gene" Marshall (Benton Jennings) is an arsonist, who ironically is a fire inspector, who appears in a flashback. Dexter places candles around him before cutting him up. His only line is "Have you ever watched someone burn alive?". Marshall is a real-estate developer and millionaire who set one of his own apartment complexes on fire, killing seven people. His psychiatrist deemed him mentally unfit to stand trial. After three months in a psychiatric institution, Marshall was released and went back to his usual life of luxury. Dexter kills Marshall in June 1993. Dexter surrounds him with candles when he straps him to the table.
- Alexander "Alex" Timmons (Demetrius Grosse) is a sniper who appears in a flashback. His only line is "Yes, I did it. Is that what you want to hear?" His death appears in the animated webisode series "Dexter: Early Cuts" where it is shown that he was the first of Dexter's kills from which a blood-slide trophy is taken. Timmons has been a hunter since he was young, developing a fondness for killing. He later became a U.S. Marine Corps sniper, allowing him to kill in the open while masking it as warfighting. Eventually, his impulse to kill overcame him and he shot and killed three civilian children and received little punishment for it, only being discharged from the Corps. Dexter first approaches him at a gun range which Timmons often practices at. He then pretends that his car has broken down and asks Timmons for assistance. While he is distracted, Dexter sedates him, abducts him and kills him in his home with a Marine Corps combat knife. Before his death, Alex admits that he had committed the crimes that brought him there.
- Emmett Meridian (Tony Goldwyn) is a psychotherapist who, as Dexter figures out, targets powerful and successful women and has encouraged at least three of his female clients to kill themselves. Dexter stalks him by taking therapy sessions under the guise of Sean Ellis and, to Dexter's surprise, ends up making a psychological breakthrough with him. Emmett puts Dexter into a state of calm and helps him to remember his dark past, seeing a boy in blood but initially not understanding the meaning. This allows him to let his guard down and helps his relationship with Rita. Dexter also manages a major catharsis by telling Meridian about his murders before killing him. He sees a camera recording in his office and breaks in at night to find the files on Meridian's computer. His M.O. is that he will put his victims on anti-depressants and eventually abruptly stop writing prescriptions, preventing the patients' brains to have time to adjust to the rapid change. His victims were Meghan Dowd, Carolyn Jillian, and Vanessa Gayle.
- Robert "Bob" Hicks (Scott Atkinson) is Paul Bennett's sponsor from Narcotics Anonymous for his recovery from drug abuse. Bob comes around Rita's house to plead that Paul is innocent and that there has been a mistake. He is there to tell her that Paul has been clean for over a month and that it is unlikely that Paul committed the crime. Rita politely but firmly tells him to mind his own business and he is not seen again.

=== Minor characters in season 2 ===
- Alfonso "Little Chino" Concepcion (Matthew Willig) alias (Chino Gonzales) is an enormous, powerful, and dangerous, yet surprisingly cunning and intelligent, member of the 29th Street Kings gang, serving as an enforcer. Chino, despite his nickname, is extremely tall and well-built (his mugshot photo indicates he is just short of 6 foot, 9 inches) and uses a machete to kill any witnesses of his gang's crimes; and for every kill, he has a teardrop of blood tattooed on his arm. Dexter targets Chino after he personally kills a man and arranges the death of the man's mother (the only witness), thus leaving the woman's daughter psychologically scarred—just like Dexter. While still reeling from the death of his brother, Dexter finally pulls it together after his initial failure to kill Chino, and later after a failed ambush by Chino. When the gang is betrayed and arrested, Chino escapes to hunt down the boy who sold out his gang, but Dexter intercepts and captures him. Dexter later kills Chino.
- James "Jimmy" Sensio (Glenn Plummer) is a blind Voodoo high priest nicknamed "the man with God in his mouth". He can be hired to perform "death curses" by selling his targets drinks poisoned with ricin. He pretends to be possessed by a spirit and curses Dexter who tells him to knock if off. After weeks of being stalked by Doakes, Dexter's murderous urges have become unbearable. However, he is for some reason reluctant to kill Jimmy and lets him go. Jimmy quickly leaves town, alive and well, never to be seen again.
- Roger Hicks (Don McManus) is a car salesman who targets and murders brunette women. He uses credit checks to obtain information on his victims, ensuring that they are single, have no pets, and live in a place where neighbors are at a distance. When researching Hicks for his next kill, Dexter ends up buying a new minivan from Hicks. This ends up working to Dexter's advantage when he realizes it is an ideal vehicle to aid him in his killings. Dexter manages to match Hicks' DNA with semen found at a crime scene. When Dexter tells him about his relationship problems with Rita, he seems to empathize and rants on his hatred of women. An enraged Dexter quickly stabs him in his chest after Hicks calls Rita a cunt. Dexter also compliments Hicks on his talent for lying as he is able to change his story on a whim.
- Curtis Barnes (John Marshall Jones) is a former U.S. Army Ranger who served several tours of duty in the Gulf War. Curtis experienced, did, and saw many terrible things during his time in the armed forces, leaving him emotionally scarred. Settling down in Miami with his Vietnamese wife Alisha, Barnes' problems never leave him; he repeatedly wakes up screaming and punches holes in the walls of his home. Alisha repeatedly tells him to get help, and arranges for him to see a psychiatrist, but Barnes never goes, believing no one can help him. Alisha eventually cannot take it anymore and declares to Barnes she is leaving him. In response, Barnes shoots Alisha twice through the heart, and once again through the head, all with his arm remaining steady and in the space of a split-second. Barnes flees for his life, and the police begin hunting him for his wife's murder. Somehow, Barnes learns that James Doakes, who also served as an Army Ranger, is leading the investigation, and arranges with his friends in the military to lead Doakes to him on his boat. Doakes goes with no support, as he was informed the man he was meeting was a member of Barnes' unit, rather than Barnes himself. Doakes sympathizes with Barnes, as he shares his emotional problems, and Barnes tries to convince Doakes to stall the investigation long enough for him to arrange passage to Cuba. Doakes, however, tells Barnes that turning himself in is a better way to deal with his pain. Barnes refuses to surrender, and raises his gun, forcing Doakes to kill him.
- Santos Jimenez (Tony Amendola) Is one of the three men present at the murder of Dexter's mother, Laura Moser. Jimenez was able to cut a deal with police and he was included in the witness protection program. In his old age, he runs a tavern in Naples, Florida, while at the same time continuing to sell cocaine. Dexter tracks him down and finds that he is a bartender, he then waits for him and beats him and attempts to kill him, but in a moment of confusion, Lila is able to convince him to stop. Later, in an attempt to bring Dexter and her back together, Lila gives Jimenez the address of the bowling alley Dexter will be leaving. Waiting outside his truck, Jimenez slashes Dexter's arm with a knife and escapes. After Lila's influence nearly gets him exposed as a killer, Dexter abandons what she has taught him and kills Jimenez with a chainsaw, the same weapon used to kill Laura Moser. Afterwards, Dexter is forced to leave his body at the cabin because he has to go to Rita since Lila has broken into her home. Dexter goes to Jimenez's cabin at night and attempts to dispose of his body. Later, Jose Garza comes looking for Jimenez because he wants to get his cocaine, but is caught by Dexter and killed at the cabin. Since Santos killed Laura Moser, he is responsible for Dexter turning into a serial killer despite that Dexter usually only kills dangerous criminals who are active.
- Kenneth "Ken" Olson (Silas Weir Mitchell) is a wannabe vigilante inspired by the Bay Harbor Butcher. He has successfully killed two criminals. One is a drug dealer he runs down with his car (Olson steals his drugs afterward). The other is an abusive husband whose anger is provoked when Olson sleeps with his wife, who is pushed down a flight of stairs. His third attempted victim, a robber who has hurt Olson's mother, escapes by stretching the rope Olson used. Dexter originally plans to stop Olson without killing him. Upon learning of Olson's first two victims, Dexter decides that Olson must be killed. Dexter does not obtain a blood sample from Olson. He leaves his dismembered remains inside a train car to send a message. Under Lila's influence, Dexter says he "had" to kill Olson (out of necessity) but did not "need" (feel the urge) to kill him.
- Juan Ryness is a pimp who murdered one of his prostitutes; he was Dexter's fourth human victim. He is arrested, but let off due to a faulty warrant. When Tom Matthews visits Harry Morgan during Debra's birthday party to inform him of Ryness's release, Harry loses his temper and later tells Dexter that he was right in training him. However, Dexter finds and kills Ryness himself; Harry finds his son standing over Ryness's dismembered body. Dexter later learns that Harry killed himself days later, rather than dying of natural causes as he had previously believed, and guesses that he was unable to face the reality of what he trained his son to do.
- Jose Garza, alias (Christopher Harlow), is a murderer and drug trafficker connected to Santos Jimenez. Initially supposed to make a deal with Jimenez for Garza to buy a quantity of cocaine, he is surprised and angered when Jimenez does not show up, and texts Jimenez's cell phone. By this point, Jimenez has been killed by Dexter, and the cell phone is in Dexter's possession. When Garza announces he knows where Jimenez's cabin is, where Dexter is holding Doakes captive, Dexter, knowing about Garza's crimes, sees a way to get rid of him: by killing him. Luring Garza into an ambush outside of Jimenez's bar, Dexter sedates and brings him back to the cabin and kills him with a hand saw in front of a horrified Doakes. Later, after the cabin is destroyed by Lila, Garza's dismembered body parts are found as well as those of Doakes himself; which the task force considers conclusive evidence that Doakes was the Bay Harbor Butcher.
- Maxwell "Max" Adams (Jonathan Banks) is the FBI Deputy Director who pushes Lundy aside during the investigation of the Bay Harbor Butcher. He appears in two episodes during the second season.
- Esteban and Teo Famosa (Gilbert Saldivar and Wilmer Calderon) are Cuban brothers and drug dealers who, after finding James Doakes in the Everglades, knock him unconscious and bring him back to the cabin where Santos Jimenez had planned to sell them cocaine. Dexter, while protecting himself, also saves Doakes by killing them both, snapping Esteban's neck and then shooting Teo in the chest.

=== Minor characters in season 3 ===
- Calvin "Cal" Rooney (Joel Weiss) is the first victim of Dexter seen in season 3. No background story is given as Dexter tells his dentist that he "had fun at a carnival" and "won a prize". It also reveals that he has at least one-eighth of his new blood-slide box filled, showing there were many more off-screen.
- Oscar Prado (Nick Hermz) is the first victim of Dexter's that does not follow "Harry's Code". While attempting to seize "Freebo", Dexter is caught by Oscar and mistakes him for a junkie looking for drugs. Oscar attacks him and Dexter, in self-defense, grabs a bayonet from Oscar and stabs him in the chest, severing his aorta and killing him almost instantly. Dexter expresses discomfort after killing him, especially after learning he worked with at-risk youth and that, for the most part, despite his drug use (which Debra discovered he bought from Freebo) and a few traffic tickets, he had not harmed anyone. He is the brother of ADA Miguel Prado, who is distraught over the loss of his brother. Because of that, Dexter attends the funeral.
- Frederick "Freebo" Bowman (Mike Erwin) is a drug dealer who has murdered two college girls. Dexter's initial attempt at killing him does not go as planned. When he goes to Freebo's house, Dexter expects to take him to a nearby house and kill him, but is instead attacked by Oscar Prado. The police believe that Freebo is the killer of Oscar Prado. Thus, Freebo becomes the prime target of police officers throughout the city. Dexter eventually finds and kills Freebo; but, at the scene of the crime, Miguel Prado finds Dexter with the killing tool. Dexter tells Prado it was self-defense, but Prado admits to Dexter he was going to kill Freebo himself. Meanwhile, the police search for Freebo is stymied when people associated with him are killed.
- Teegan Campbell (Jelly Howie) is the drug-addicted girlfriend of Freebo. Dexter witnesses a falling out between Freebo and Teegan before he initially goes to kill Freebo. When Teegan is found dead with a piece of skin cut off, she is considered a Jane Doe, but Dexter recognizes her. Teegan is assumed by Debra to be a "strawberry", a rich college girl who pays for drugs with sex. This helps Dexter locate her apartment where he surprisingly finds Freebo hiding. After killing Freebo, Dexter surreptitiously feeds clues to Debra that lead her to Teegan's identity and her link to Freebo. Debra, and initially Dexter, assumes that Freebo is Teegan's killer, though in reality she was actually killed by George Washington King, aka the Skinner.
- Wendell Owens (Marc John Jefferies) is a 15-year-old boy who once served as the doorman for Freebo. Debra finds him and questions him, in the process establishing a friendly relationship with the boy. A short time later, when Owens is found to be the latest victim of the Skinner, who, unlike the previous victims, died from the skinning process and not strangulation, Debra takes it personally. His murder leads Debra to the conclusion that the Skinner is tracking the investigation and using her leads to find Freebo.
- Javier Garza (Ray Santiago) is a pimp who Debra pressures information out about Freebo. Javier is soon found dead with his skin peeled off, and it is assumed that Freebo has killed him. However, Dexter had killed Freebo before Javier died, and the police eventually realize that Freebo is not likely to have killed Javier or Teegan. It is later revealed that Javier has been killed by the Skinner.
- Mario Estorga (Jerry Zatarain) is a tree trimmer and illegal Nicaraguan immigrant. He has a family but would rather get deported than divulge any information on the Skinner. But when Debra puts trimmed trees in his driveway to make him think that the Skinner has come to his house, he tells them that he has a storage unit under a highway.
- Nathan Marten (Jason Kaufman) is a pedophile who approaches Astor while Dexter, Rita and the kids are shopping at a grocery store. Later, while at the beach, Dexter sees Marten taking pictures of Astor. While initially hesitant to kill Marten because he does not satisfy "The Code of Harry" (he is not a killer), Dexter strangles him after it becomes apparent that Marten will eventually try to rape Astor. Possibly because he is not a murderer, Dexter does not take (or is at least not shown taking) a blood slide sample from him.
- Ethan Turner (Larry Sullivan) married wealthy women, killed them, and took their money and assets. Ethan has killed at least two wives. Miguel Prado tries to prosecute him, but cannot, supposedly due to lack of evidence. Miguel brings his frustrations about the case to Dexter's attention, who investigates as well and decides to seek Ethan in Bimini. Upon boarding the same cruise ship Ethan was on, he traps Ethan in his room, kills, and dismembers him, then gets off the ship. Miguel's office later receives a fax reporting that Ethan has been reported missing, and, having been told by the Coast Guard that Dexter was not where he said he was "fishing", knows immediately that Dexter has killed Ethan. Miguel confronts Dexter about this, and reveals he had deliberately mentioned Ethan to Dexter in the hope that he would avenge Ethan's victims, whom the justice system had failed. Miguel, because Dexter seized this opportunity, expresses his admiration and respect for Dexter for achieving through vigilantism what he had failed to do legally.
- Clemson Galt (Blake Gibbons) is a neo-Nazi who murders his girlfriend for getting pregnant, as well as the family of an "Aryan defector". He was found not guilty of the killings after his associates frighten or kill all witnesses. However, he was found guilty for an unrelated armed robbery and was sentenced to 15 years in a maximum security prison. Dexter suggests Galt to Miguel Prado as a target, intending to scare Prado off by showing the difficulty and risk of such a project. To Dexter's surprise, Prado brings Galt to a Miami courthouse as an expert witness and releases him. Dexter, posing as a fellow neo-Nazi, picks him up only to capture him and kill him. Dexter says that Galt has been on his "Top Ten" list of people to kill for years, but he has never had the opportunity to do it, although this could just be a lie in order to sell Miguel Prado onto the idea.
- Albert Chung pushes an old woman down the stairs and escapes prosecution with the help of Ellen Wolf. Afterwards, he breaks into a house and, being discovered by a young college student named Lisa Morton, kills her and flees. He is identified by Vince Masuka because he has left bloody sock prints at the crime scene, something he has done numerous times before. Wolf tries to get his charges lessened as well as several other benefits. However, she later helps turn him in to the police. Masuka shows hatred towards him as he states that "he gives Asians a bad name", even more so when Dexter observes that Masuka and Chung look strikingly similar.
- William "Billy" Fleeter (Jeff Chase) is an ex-football player who gave up sports for gambling. Running up serious debts, he pays them off by helping his bookie kill others who cannot pay their debts. Dexter uses Fleeter to help train Miguel Prado in his trade. He shows Miguel how to research his victims to be sure they deserve to be killed (or meet the "Code of Harry" in Dexter's case). He also reveals to Miguel how to stalk and subdue his victims, as well as how to kill them and not leave any traces behind. However, he says the best place to hide a body is in an open grave in a cemetery, and does not mention using his boat. Fleeter is killed by Miguel Prado in an old casino storage room.
- Toby Edwards (Vincent Pagano) is a bartender who Ellen Wolf hits on when she goes into his bar. He flirts back and later that day, calls her several times and goes around her house. She does not answer because she has been killed by Miguel Prado. Toby is later taken in for questioning as Lt. LaGuerta's prime suspect and she vents some of her emotions to him, but Quinn finds an alibi for him and Toby tips her off that he had seen a black SUV at the time he was there. This leads to María suspecting Miguel of Ellen Wolf's death.
- Tammy Okama (Jane McLean) is the party organizer, hired by Dexter's co-workers to organize his bachelor party. After the party, she and Masuka spend the night together. Her sense of humor resembles Masuka's, and she attends Dexter's and Rita's wedding as his date. Even so, she has not been seen or mentioned since the season three finale, where she and Masuka dance at the wedding reception.

=== Minor characters in season 4 ===
- Martin "Marty" (Alexander Lewis) runs a food truck that the police department frequent for coffee and sandwiches.
- Benito "Benny" Gomez (Gino Aquino) is a former boxer who has beaten two people to death, to the point of disfiguration. A fatigued Dexter is set to testify his forensic evidence at Gomez's trial, but he brings the wrong evidence, leading to Gomez being freed. As a result, Joey Quinn is upset with Dexter. Dexter later catches and kills Gomez in an abandoned boxing ring. He is his first victim in season 4. It initially appears as though Dexter crashes his car with Gomez' body parts in the trunk; but it is later revealed that Dexter stored Gomez' body parts in the boxing ring where he killed Gomez.
- Zoey Kruger (Christina Cox) is a policewoman who shot and killed her husband and daughter, and hid the crime by killing the suspect. Kruger learns that Dexter is stalking her but is initially suspicious that his motive is to re-open her murder case. She explains how family life forced her to kill her family. Dexter notices the similarity between them, but realizes he would rather get caught than kill his family. He also realizes (to his own surprise) that he does not want to lose his family. He then kills her.
- High school sweethearts Nikki Wald (Alicia Lagano) and Jonathan "Johnny" Rose are a pair of criminals who target tourists and shoot those who are uncooperative (thus being dubbed the Vacation Murderers). When LaGuerta and Batista approach the suspects' house for questioning, they shoot at them. In the fourth episode of the season, suspecting the two of gunning down Detective Debra Morgan and former FBI Special Agent Frank Lundy (actually committed by Christine Hill), Sergeant Angel Batista decides to reveal to the press that one of the killers, Johnny Rose, has syphilis and has numerous partners. Within hours, the news is spread around Miami. This revelation of information was designed to create dissension between the Vacation Murderers, thus making them easier to catch. Johnny Rose is gunned down by his female partner in crime, being shot three times in the chest. She is shortly found in the street, gun in hand, high on meth, having a nervous breakdown. She is tasered by Detective Joey Quinn, and taken into custody. Wald confesses to the vacation murders and robberies but insists she did not kill Lundy or shoot Debra.
- Jonathan Farrow (Greg Ellis) is a contemporary artist and photographer who enjoys having his subjects slightly beaten and cut, creating violent photos that disturb even Dexter. He was also accused of a rape seven years prior but the charges were dropped when the victim recanted; however, the lead detective believes she was paid off. When an arm of one of his models is found in an alligator, Farrow becomes the prime suspect of her murder and several others. Despite Harry's demands that he focus on Trinity, Dexter considers Farrow a potential victim. After Farrow suggests photographing Debra like his models, Dexter immediately decides to kill him. After finding blood and a fingernail of the dead model at his studio, Dexter sets out to find him at a club, only for Quinn to interfere. After camping with Cody the next night, Dexter instead heads to Farrow's house and kills him in his typical style, albeit using Farrow's equipment for a much more dramatic kill room. Even while strapped down, Farrow maintains his innocence, defending his work as a contrast of beauty and violence. The next morning, to Dexter's shock, Farrow's assistant Timothy Brand (portrayed by John Griffin) is arrested for the murders on airtight evidence. This revelation leaves Harry greatly disappointed in Dexter and Dexter feeling what could only be described as guilt for killing the wrong person. Farrow was innocent and is the fifth person Dexter has killed that did not fit the Code of Harry in not being vetted as killers (the others were Camilla, Marten and the Famosa brothers), though unlike the previous four, Dexter was entirely sure that Farrow was the killer at the time.
- Valerie Hodges (Mary Mara) is one of Harry Morgan's many lovers. She had a romantic relationship with Harry before he left her for Doris Morgan. Debra tracks her down and asks her about Harry. She initially does not remember much but later remembers the address of one of his lovers, which turns out to be Laura Moser's old house, which leads to Debra discovering Dexter's brother was the Ice Truck Killer and that he witnessed his mother's death.
- Scott Smith (Jake Short) is a boy kidnapped from his babysitter at a mall by Arthur Mitchell. His father, Nick (portrayed by Roger Ranney) arranges a manhunt. He is rescued by Dexter before Arthur could kill him. Later during Debra's interview with Scott, his experience helps the police to identify Arthur as the Trinity Killer.
- Stanley "Stan" Beaudry (Ian Patrick Williams) is a trucker who allegedly murdered a prostitute, but was never arrested due to contamination of the chain of evidence of the alleged murder weapon by the police. Dexter sets him up to be the primary suspect for the Trinity Killer as Miami PD is closing in, and then kills him in his truck. This kill is done hastily on scant evidence, lacking even the picture of Beaudry's victim, which Dexter acknowledges. Later, the police track the movements of Beaudry from city to city on his truck routes and find the Trinity Killer's post cards to his daughter, Christine. This clears Beaudry as being the Trinity Killer after finding he has rock solid alibis, including that he was hundreds of miles from the scene of some of the Trinity Killings at the time of the murders. They determine correctly that the DNA, murder weapon, and Lundy's files were planted, but attribute this to the real Trinity Killer (the evidence was actually planted by Dexter).

=== Minor characters in season 5 ===
- Raymond "Ray" Walker (Adam John Harrington) is an FBI agent investigating Rita's death and its ties to the Trinity Killer. Quinn asks him where the safe-house from the Mitchell family is, to ask them some questions about Kyle Butler.
- Rankin (Brad Carter) is Dexter's first kill following Rita's death. It is not, however, a murder by Harry's code, but rather an act of rage. Dexter, roaming the Miami outskirts, meets him at a fuel dock store, and — as Rankin taunts Dexter's dead wife — Dexter responds by beating him to death. When done, thoughts of Harry appear, saying that the slaughter was the first human thing he has seen Dexter do since Rita's death. It is Dexter's third known inadvertent killing.
- The Barrel Girl Gang, a raping/killing circle that folds out as the main target of Dexter for season 5. The circle is responsible for kidnapping, raping and killing twelve women; Lumen was intended to be their thirteenth victim. Their victims were initially held captive in the campgrounds where they raped their first victim, and later in the attic of Boyd Fowler. Famous author and motivational speaker Jordan Chase is revealed to be the driving force of the circle, which consists of him and his childhood friends. All five men appear in a photo, taken by their first rape victim, Emily Birch. As members of the circle begin to disappear, Debra deduces that their latest victim escaped and is exacting her vengeance, with the possible help of a man who loves her. While Debra eventually arrives to the camp, she finds the vigilante couple (in reality, Dexter and Lumen, hidden behind opaque plastic sheeting and therefore, unseen to her), she spares them and advises them to disappear before the police arrive.
- Boyd Fowler (Shawn Hatosy) works in roadkill pick-up. Dexter first targets him as he spots blood in the van he uses to move out of his and Rita's home. Fowler serves as the circle's "finisher", i.e. the one responsible for finally killing and dumping their victims. His M.O. is to electrocute them, put their bodies in an oil drum filled with formaldehyde, and dump the drums in a Florida marsh. Since Boyd tranquilizes Dexter in his initial attempt to kill him, Dexter kills Boyd in his home, only to realize he has been watched by the circle's last victim, Lumen, whom Boyd had yet to finish off. Boyd keeps locks of hair as trophies of his victims. However, as he only takes them once he kills the women, there are only 12 of these. This, plus Cole having thirteen DVDs, leads Debra to conclude that a victim of the circle escaped, and is killing the members.
- Daniel "Dan" Mendell (Sean O'Bryan) is a dentist (and called "Dan the Dentist" by Dexter, Lumen, and Debra), and the first of the circle to be tracked down by Lumen after Boyd's death. She attempts to kill him by shooting him, but only manages to wound him. Not able to handle the situation herself, she calls Dexter, who initially does not believe that Mendell is in fact one of her abusers, due to the fact she only recognized his smell. However, Dexter is proven wrong when Mendell manages to phone his friends, warning them that Lumen is alive. Dexter responds by snapping Mendell's neck. He is married and keeps his wife in the dark of his activities by claiming he and his friends (whom she had never met) were going on a week-long fishing trip.
- Cole Harmon (Chris Vance) is Jordan Chase's head of security, as well as a part of the circle. Lumen refers to him as "Suit and Tie", since he has a habit of folding his coat and placing it on a chair before he would rape her, as well as the only rapist to remove her blindfold, as he was sure the woman would be killed. He also tortured her, leaving scars on her back. He encounters Lumen in a hotel during the seminar and nearly kills her, before Dexter subdues him. He is then killed by Dexter, with Lumen as a witness. Before Dexter kills him, he asked for the names of the others, but Cole refuses to say. His death does, however, lead to a conversation between Chase and Dexter, in which Dexter realizes that Chase is a member of the gang. Cole took videos of the circle torturing and raping their victims as trophies.
- Alexander "Alex" Tilden (Scott Grimes) is a bank employee who saves a piece of jewelry from each of his victims. He is the last of the circle to be tracked down by Dexter and Lumen, identified to them by Emily Birch. In an attempt to save himself, Alex states that the real blame lies with Jordan Chase, claiming that he is the one who made them assault the women, that Chase made him do things he never would have done, enraging Lumen, who tells him that they have made her do things she never would have done. He then claims that he can give them Chase, only to be rebuffed by Dexter. In a final attempt to stay alive, he offers them money, all they have to do is give him a number. Lumen coldly replies "Thirteen," a reference to her DVD number, and how all she was to them was their thirteenth victim. He is then killed by Lumen, per the code of Harry.
- James "Jim" McCord (Raphael Sbarge) works in Internal Affairs, and investigates Angel for a possible assault on a co-worker. While the investigation is dropped, Angel starts believing that McCord and LaGuerta are having an affair. He accidentally ruins an undercover operation of theirs, when he walks into a hotel room in which he assumes he will find them sleeping together. Both McCord and Maria are furious at him.
- Brothers Carlos and Marco Fuentes (Joseph Julian Soria and Jose Aguirre) become the first proper suspects in the Santa Muerte murder investigation. Debra leads a storming of the Fuentes brothers' apartment complex, and finds Carlos holding a teenage boy hostage with a machete—the same kind of weapon used in the Santa Muerte killings. Carlos escapes the building after slitting the boy's throat. The boy survives, but the Fuente brothers go off-grid. Thanks to a tip from an acquaintance of the Fuentes brothers, the police track them down to a local dance club called Club Mayan. However, the arrest fails miserably, leaving Carlos and two additional people dead, and Marco on the run.
- Lance Robinson (Chad Allen) is a man cruising the Internet for sexual encounters with other men, occasionally killing them as well. Hoping for it to be his first "normal" killing since Rita's death, Dexter drugs him. However, before he is able to finish Robinson off, he is interrupted by a phone call from Lumen, who has just shot Dan Mendell. While Dexter is attending to Lumen and Mendell, Robinson regains consciousness and tries to escape. Dexter recaptures him, kills him, and manages to stage Robinson's and Mendell's deaths as a sexual encounter gone out of hand.
- Emily Birch (Angela Bettis) is the first victim of Jordan Chase's circle. According to her story, she was victimized while she and her assailants were still teenagers, but was let to live and is still in a distant relationship with Chase. She was also the one to take the picture of the circle, after being raped. Controlled by Chase, she sets up Lumen and Dexter for a trap. However, Chase kills her after she protests the killing of Lumen.

=== Minor characters in season 6 ===
- Lisa Marshall (Molly Parker) is Travis Marshall's caring older sister and an elementary school teacher. They have grown apart as Travis is not able to spend much time with her, due to his killing as the "Doomsday Killer." His Doomsday persona eventually takes over and he kills Lisa for talking to the police. He then uses her body in the Whore of Babylon tableau.
- Nicholas "Nick" (Germaine De Leon) is one of Brother Sam's employees at the garage. Wanting to remain in the gang he was a part of prior to going to prison, he murders Brother Sam to prove which side of the law he is on. He is later confronted by Dexter, who intends to kill him against Brother Sam's wishes. Nick asks for forgiveness, stating he had no choice. However, Nick realizes that the police have no evidence to tie him to the killing and subsequently gloats about getting away with it. Dexter, initially willing to let him go, then goes ahead and kills him.
- Nathan Roberts (David Monahan) is a jogger who Travis Marshall kills and butchers to resemble the Four Horsemen of the Apocalypse.
- Dr. Michelle Ross (Rya Kihlstedt) is a therapist who the police department assigns to Debra after she is involved in a shooting. During their sessions, Debra starts to believe that she is in love with Dexter.
- Professor Carissa Porter (Mariana Klaveno) is Professor Gellar's former assistant who provides Miami Metro with insight into their prime suspect in the "Doomsday Killers" case. Quinn has a brief affair with her.
- Holly Benson (Lacey Beeman) is a would-be victim of the "Doomsday Killers" whom Travis released because he was questioning the morality of their acts. When Travis acknowledged that Gellar was no more than a figment of his imagination and hence completely responsible for the Doomsday Killings, he tracks down Benson and kills her to clean up "a mistake".
- Steven "Steve" and Elizabeth "Beth" Dorsey (Kyle Davis and Jordana Spiro): a fanatically religious couple who team up with Travis to kill Holly Benson. Dexter kills Steve, mistaking him for Travis. Beth is later dispatched to Miami Metro by Travis to release Wormwood as a poison gas. Dexter, realizing her plans, locks her in an interrogation room just as she releases the gas, making her its only victim.

=== Minor characters in season 7 ===
- Wayne Randall (Daniel Buran): A man who went on a killing spree but was imprisoned for life after his accomplice, Hannah McKay, agreed to help the police incriminate him. Randall agrees to help the police find bodies of his victims, though he soon kills himself. Dexter suspects it was just a ploy to get a few more days of "sunshine and frosty swirl" (ice cream) before his death.
- Raymond "Ray" Speltzer (Matt Gerald) is suspected of two murders, and whom Dexter believes would most likely kill again. Dexter investigates him further, noting that he has access to a mausoleum at the cemetery where he works. Dexter finds proof of Speltzer's guilt inside it. Speltzer brings a girl home to his place and kills her as Debra breaks in to confront him. Dexter saves Debra from Speltzer, who escapes. Speltzer removes the evidence from the mausoleum, but is caught by local police. During Debra's interrogation, he cracks and admits that he murdered at least one of the girls. However, the arresting police officers fail to properly mirandize him, and Speltzer's lawyer uses this technicality to set him free. Dexter enters Speltzer's Motorhome to catch Speltzer off-guard, but he unexpectedly enters and knocks Dexter out. Dexter awakes in a maze. He manages to fend off Speltzer and escape from the roof. Speltzer attends the burial of his last victim, which makes Debra lose control and she has to be restrained. Dexter finally catches Speltzer late at night at the cemetery and straps him to the cremation bench. He then burns him and his box of blood slides in the fire.
- Donna Randall (Beth Grant) is Wayne Randall's mother who brings further evidence of his crimes to the police after her son's death.
- Salvatore "Sal" Price (Santiago Cabrera), is an investigative writer who has written a book on the life story of Wayne Randall. He thinks Hannah McKay might have been more involved in the killings than previously presumed, and wants to write a sequel about her. To further his personal investigation into the subject, he approaches Miami Metro hoping to get access to the case files. He asks Debra for a date and later tells her about the differences in the blood reports submitted by Price's friend and Dexter. The next day, Price spots Dexter dropping off Hannah at her home, and confronts Dexter in the street, telling him he knows Dexter has fudged the blood reports. Dexter manages to convince Price not to say anything in exchange for information on Wayne Randall. Price visits Hannah at work and pressures her to give an interview by threatening to go public with her relationship with Dexter. She agrees to the interview on the condition that he keeps Dexter out of his book. Price interviews Hannah, who admits to stabbing the woman at the hotel. Later that night, Price goes to Dexter's apartment to learn what he knows about Wayne Randall. Dexter confronts Price with his plan to frame him for murder unless he backs off, but Price collapses and dies, apparently from a heart attack. It's later revealed Hannah poisoned Sal and she is charged with his murder after Dexter hands over the pen she used after Hannah tries to kill Debra.
- Oleg Mickic (Karl Herlinger) is an ex-soldier, and one of the two assassins sent by the Koshka Brotherhood to eliminate Isaak. Mickic has worked for Isaak in the past, and when Isaak discovers that Mickic is being sent to kill him to see if Mickic has any loyalty to his former boss, but Mickic's mind is already made up. Mickic is a sniper who is accustomed to killing from a distance, and has a habit of buying his rifles locally. When Isaak recruits Dexter into helping him dispose of the brotherhood's hitmen, Dexter tracks Mickic to a firing range near the airport where Mickic is testing his rifle. While Mickic is lying on his stomach for precision, Dexter comes behind him and stabbed him through the torso, covering his mouth to muffle any screams.
- Benjamin Caffrey (Sherman Augustus) is a hitman based in New York and one of the two assassins sent by the Koshka Brotherhood to eliminate Isaak. Caffrey kills all of his victims with from a close range with knives. He has worked for Isaak in the past, but has no qualms about killing his former boss. When Caffrey is unable to contact Mickic, as he had been killed by Dexter, Caffrey begins to follow Dexter, who he believes would lead him to Isaak. He begins trailing Dexter, who leads him to a cargo ship. There, the two face off, both wielding knives, but before either can make a move, Isaak appears from behind, shooting Caffrey with a silenced pistol. Dexter and Isaak then throw Caffrey's body overboard.
- Clinton "Clint" McKay (Jim Beaver) is Hannah McKay's father. A convicted felon and gambler, he initially makes contact with Hannah to reconcile with her about his past behavior. Things turn nasty when Hannah refuses his request for $20,000 to open a business (actually, to pay off his gambling debts), using threats of exposing her for a past murder. He tries to extort money from Dexter as well, so Dexter kills him. Clint's death at the hands of Dexter is a violation of the Code of Harry as Clint has never killed anyone, though Dexter ignores this as he wants to protect Hannah. However, there are differences in the way Dexter kills him: Clint is still dressed, Dexter kills him directly on the Slice of Life and he doesn't dismember his corpse before he disposes of his body in the Gulf Stream.
- Joseph Jensen (Mike Foy) is the Phantom Arsonist. After killing seven people in two weeks, Dexter tracks him down when he runs his fingerprints through juvenile records. He initially plans to kill the arsonist himself but, instead, he hands him over to the police department anonymously.
- Philip "Phil" Bosso (Brett Rickaby) is an arson investigator, who Dexter suspects as the Phantom Arsonist. However, his selection of incendiaries turns out merely to be for Civil War reenactments.
- Arlene Schram (Nicole LaLiberte) is the only witness to Hannah McKay's crime of poisoning a camp counselor. She later helps Hannah escape from prison.
- Hector Estrada (Nestor Serrano) is a drug dealer and the leader of the three men who killed Dexter's mother, Laura Moser, for being a police informant. LaGuerta has him released from prison on parole in an attempt to trap Dexter, trying to prove he is a serial killer. Dexter eventually kills Estrada and Debra shoots LaGuerta. Dexter then makes it look like they both killed each other to prevent further police investigation into him.

=== Minor characters in season 8 ===
- Angela Miller (Dana L. Wilson) is a Detective at Miami Metro Homicide. Captain Batista is torn between promoting her and Quinn to Sergeant. Miller is a background character in season 7.
- Lyle Sussman (Scott Michael Morgan) is a hunter who is murdered on tape by the Brain Surgeon.
- Ronald "Ron" Galuzzo (Andrew Elvis Miller) is Vogel's former patient who Dexter suspects of being the Brain Surgeon. Dexter discovers that he is not the Brain Surgeon, but rather a cannibalistic killer.
- Niki Walters (Dora Madison Burge) is Masuka's long-lost daughter by sperm donation whom he hires as a lab assistant.
- Cassie Jollenston (Bethany Joy Lenz) is Dexter's neighbor and Jamie's friend. Jamie attempts to set Dexter up with her, but this fails and she begins dating Oliver Saxon, who murders her.
- A.J. Yates (Aaron McCusker) is Vogel's former patient and a serial killer with a foot fetish.
- Maxwell "Max" Clayton (Kenny Johnson) is a U.S. Marshal hired by Elway to track down Hannah McKay.

=== Minor characters in Dexter: New Blood ===
- Edward Olsen (Frederic Lehne) is a petrol billionaire that lives near Iron Lake. In the search for Matthew Caldwell, he lends his helicopter to the police force.
- Esther (Katy Sullivan) is an amputee working at the Iron Lake police station.
- Fred Jr. (Michael Cyril Creighton) is the owner of the hunting shop where Dexter works.
- Tess (Gizel Jiménez) is a teacher and bartender in Iron Lake.
- Abraham Brown (Gregory Cruz) is a Native American near Iron Lake.

== Novel characters ==
=== Darkly Dreaming Dexter characters ===
- The original Dexter novel, Darkly Dreaming Dexter, upon which the TV series' first season is based, includes the characters of Dexter, Debra (as Deborah), Rita, LaGuerta (first name Midgia), Batista, Doakes (first name Albert), Masuka (as Masuoka), Harry, Astor, Cody, Doris, Laura (although unnamed), Brian, Camilla Figg, Captain Matthews, Mike Donovan (as Father Donovan), Jamie Jaworski, and Nurse Mary (only referred to as "Last Nurse"), although some of them with different characteristics. Notably, Rita's ex-husband is referred to (although not by name), but the character himself does not appear. All other season one characters are created exclusively for the television series, and do not appear in the novels.
- Daryll Earl McHale is the most notable character exclusive to the book. He is arrested for the Tamiami Trail killings after confessing to them. Dexter learns that McHale is a security guard at the arena, and that he is prone to getting drunk, robbing gas stations and beating his wife. The character is separated into two for the TV show, with Tony Tucci as the arena security guard and Neil Perry confessing to the killings.

=== Characters from subsequent novels ===
The first season is largely based upon the first book (Darkly Dreaming Dexter), but for the following books and seasons the stories develop separately. Thus (with few exceptions) the characters from the subsequent novels (Dearly Devoted Dexter, Dexter in the Dark, Dexter by Design and Dexter Is Delicious) do not appear in the television series, nor do the characters introduced in seasons 2–5 appear in the books.

- Kyle Chutsky is a federal agent who appears only in the book series. He is a former Special Forces operative who worked alongside Sgt. Doakes. When a member of their old unit is found with all of his body parts removed, Doakes recognizes the work of his former comrade, Dr. Danco, and Chutsky is called in to help with the case. In the course of the investigation, Chutsky is captured by Dr. Danco. His little finger, on which he wears a distinctive ring, is amputated and mailed to Debra. Chutsky is later found missing an arm and a leg but fortunately, not much else. Dexter, after examining Chutsky's finger, pockets the ring, intending to return it to Debra. The ring is found by Rita, who mistakes it for an engagement ring. In Dexter in the Dark, Chutsky stayed with Deborah and had not been returned to work for his agency due to his handicap. In Dexter is Delicious, after believing himself of no use to Deborah after the kidnapping of her and Dexter at the hands of a cannibalist coven, Kyle leaves Deborah, and despite her efforts, she is unable to find him.
- Dr. Danco is a surgeon who mutilates people while keeping them alive. He shaves his patients, then removes everything in a body that is not essential for life (arms, legs, penis, teeth, tongue, etc.), leaving his victims unable to move or communicate, driving them insane. His procedure also involves chemicals that cause brain damage. In medical school, he learned that he could cut people open without feeling any empathy. He offered his services to the United States military as a torturer. His comrades, who included Sergeant Albert Doakes, nicknamed him "Danco" after a vegetable slicing machine. The joke was that Dr. Danco, like his namesake, made sliced "vegetables". Dexter makes a similar conclusion about his victims, before the name is revealed, calling them "yodeling potatoes". Dr. Danco likes to listen to Tito Puente while working on his victims. He also plays a warped version of hangman, with his subjects being the 'hangman' in question. During a covert operation in El Salvador, he was turned in to the enemy in exchange for several prisoners. In Dearly Devoted Dexter, Dr. Danco is released and goes to Miami, looking for revenge on his former comrades. His real name is revealed to be Martin Henker.
  At the end of the novel, Dexter tracks him down, but is uncharacteristically unprepared, allowing Danco to overpower him. Just as Danco is about to mutilate Dexter, however, Deborah bursts in and shoots him dead.
- Randall "Randy" MacGregor is a real estate agent who rapes and murders young boys. He takes the boys on his boat, equipped with toys and children's movies, and, when he is finished with them, ties their bodies to anchors and drops them overboard. He keeps several photos of his victims. When confronted with these photos, he says to Dexter "I hope one of them was yours." A red cowboy boot worn by the photographer in one picture shows Dexter that MacGregor has an accomplice. He appears in Dearly Devoted Dexter.
- Steven "Steve" Reiker is a pedophile who photographs the young boys that Randy McGregor rapes and murders. Dexter wishes to kill him, but cannot because Sgt. Doakes keeps following him. Dexter is finally able to kill him at the end of Dearly Devoted Dexter.
- Carl is a serial killer who murdered 11 people before being captured by Harry Morgan. After catching a teenaged Dexter trying to kill a school bully, Harry introduces him to Carl to teach him the importance of not getting caught. Carl appears in Dexter in the Dark. He also appears in season 2 as Harry took a teenage Dexter to an execution to teach him the importance of not getting caught. After the exhilarating experience, the teenage Dexter learns the importance of not getting caught.
- "The Watcher" is not a single person, but a group of cultists worshiping the ancient god Moloch. They believe that the spirit of Moloch jumps from one person to another. The Watcher tails Dexter, who he refers to as "The Other", in Dexter in the Dark, believing that Dexter's Dark Passenger is a child and enemy of their god.
- I.T.—introduced in Dexter in the Dark—is a mythical, godlike entity which has existed since the beginning of time and has several similarities to the Dark Passenger. I.T.'s story is explained with a somewhat Biblical tone. I.T. takes great pleasure in entering creatures as a "passenger" and influencing them to kill other creatures. I.T. works to create other murderous entities similar to ITself but soon turns against many of them, causing them to flee. I.T. and I.T.'s offspring go to war, with I.T. being victorious. Some of I.T.'s remaining children stay in hiding, fearing I.T.'s power.
- Manuel "Manny" Borque is a conceited caterer who appears in Dexter in the Dark. He is hired for a high price to cater Dexter and Rita's wedding. He claims to be booked two years in advance. Through a contractual loophole, Manny is able to make whatever he wants and charge whatever price he decides. He is killed by members of the Moloch cult. This makes Dexter a murder suspect as he was the last person to see Manny alive and owed him a large amount of money, giving him a motive.
- "The Old Man" is the unnamed leader of a cult that worships the ancient god Moloch. His cult is responsible for several murders in which the bodies were burned and decapitated, the heads replaced by ceramic bull heads. He wields an ornate bronze dagger with the Aramaic letters "MLK" (Moloch) etched into it. He is killed by this dagger, wielded by Cody Bennett, at the end of Dexter in the Dark.
- Dr. Darius Starzak is a former professor of religious philosophy at the University of Krakow. He was fired for membership in an illegal society, a cult worshipping Moloch, and was suspected in a string of child murders. Dexter shoots him dead at the end of Dexter in the Dark.
- Alexander "Zander" Macauley is the son of a rich family who owns citrus groves, a large ranch, and a business that Dexter says "[dumps] phosphates into Lake Okeechobee". Zander is publicly hailed as a philanthropist for employing homeless people to work on his family's ranch. In reality, however, Zander murders them and disposes of their bodies in large drums of acid, keeping a single shoe as a trophy. Zander is also connected to the cult of Moloch. While looking through Zander's tax and travel records, Dexter learns that the ranch is in fact idle, and that Zander takes frequent, unexplained flights in his private jet. Dexter kills him in much the same way he (Zander) kills his victims, even wondering if he, too, should take a shoe as a souvenir.
- Kurt Wagner is a college student and a member of the cult of Moloch. He is responsible for several murders in which the bodies are beheaded, burned, and given ceramic bull's heads. One of his first victims is his girlfriend. He has a distinctive tattoo of the Aramaic letters M.L.K. on the back of his neck. He is found killed in a fashion similar to his own victims.
  Notably, Wagner shares his name with popular Marvel Comics character "Nightcrawler". It is unknown if this is coincidental or a deliberate homage to his Marvel namesake, given Nightcrawler's own religious background and demonic appearance.
- Dr. Wilkins is a professor at the University of Miami. He attempts to frame a colleague for the murders of the Moloch cult. He attempts to sacrifice Astor and Cody to Moloch, but Dexter intervenes and shoots him in the head.
- Brandon Weiss is a character from Dexter by Design who is suspected of stabbing Deborah and leaving decorated corpses all over Miami. After Dexter kills his partner Doncevic (whom it is implied they had a romantic relationship), he is contacted by Weiss with evidence that shows Dexter killing Doncevic who then focuses his attention on Dexter for revenge. At the end of the novel, Weiss kidnaps Rita and plans to publicly kill her at an art convention, as well as to publicly show the footage of Dexter killing Doncevic, even planning to use photo manipulation techniques to make sure Dexter's face is shown. Dexter arrives in time and frees Rita; during the struggle against Weiss, Dexter is overpowered by him; he is saved when Rita hits him from behind, causing Weiss to fall on his own power saw killing him.
- Aleksandar "Alex" Doncevic is a victim of Dexter's who appears in Dexter by Design. Dexter suspected him of stabbing his sister Deborah as well as displaying several decorated corpses around Miami. Dexter feels some semblance of guilt when he learns that Doncevic's fingerprints do not match the ones on the knife that stabbed Deborah and that the corpses were stolen from a morgue rather than killed. Unlike the show continuity, which features Dexter having killed outside of the Code on numerous occasions, Doncevic is the only known victim in the novels to have been a violation of the Code, and therefore Dexter's only known innocent victim.
- Lily Anne Morgan is Dexter and Rita's daughter in the books, replacing Harrison. Dexter is extremely protective of her, deciding to give up his night-wandering ways in order to raise her well. However, when he later suspects that he is being watched (by his brother, Brian), he decides that his kills protect Lily Anne from the evil in the world. She is born in Dexter Is Delicious.
- Samantha Aldovar is a character from Dexter Is Delicious. She is a student from a rich family, and when she and her best friend disappear, the family believe she has been kidnapped, while Deborah thinks they have run away. When Dexter finds her while investigating a murder connected to cannibalism, she reveals she wants to be eaten. She and Dexter have sex after drinking water laced with MDMA. When they are rescued by Deborah, she threatens to accuse him of rape. She later disappears again and is found in an abandoned amusement park used by a cannibalistic cult as a hideout. The cult's leader grills a piece of her. After Dexter and his brother overpower the cult, he finds she has nearly died of her injuries, and tells her she was delicious, letting her die happy.
- Tyler Spanos is Samantha Aldovar's best friend in Dexter Is Delicious. She has the same desires as Samantha, and her body is eventually found, partly eaten. When Dexter finds Samantha, she tells him Tyler was eaten first by the cannibalistic cult that took them.
- Deacon "Deke" Slater is Deborah's partner during the events of Dexter Is Delicious. Dexter considers him stupid. He's later killed by the cannibal cult they are investigating.
- Victor Chapin is a member of the cannibalistic cult in Dexter Is Delicious. His teeth have been surgically filed to fangs. Dexter kills him after realizing he ate Tyler Spanos.
- Roberto "Bobby" Acosta is the son of a wealthy city official who pays for his problems to go away. His teeth are surgically filed to fangs, and he is later revealed to be part of a cannibalistic cult that eats migrants, but later comes to the attention of the police after targeting two wealthy teenagers. He helps capture Deborah, Dexter and Chutsky, but flees the crime scene when they are saved by Brian. At the end of the story, Dexter decides to kill him as a "present" for Deborah, and it's implied he does.
- Alana Acosta is Bobby Acosta's stepmother, who is later shown to be the leader of the cannibalistic cult. She discreetly gives information on Bobby's location to Deborah and Dexter, but later has them captured when they go to the abandoned amusement park she told them about. As she grills a piece of Samantha Aldovar to eat, she is shot and killed by Brian, who came to save Dexter.
- Jose "Joe" Acosta is a wealthy city official who has bailed his son out of multiple problems. He is not involved with the cannibalistic cult that his wife and son lead.
- Nicholas Morgan is Deborah's son, with Kyle Chutsky, though his father is not part of his life. Deborah is revealed to be pregnant with him in Dexter Is Delicious. He's born sometime before the events of Double Dexter, and Deborah raises him alone.
- Bernard Elan is a man with homicidal urges who witnesses Dexter kill one of his victims, and after that, begins stalking Dexter to emulate him, using the screen name "Shadow". After Dexter discovers who he is, he kills his ex-wife, with whom he still has been living, and flees, hacking relevant databases to leave information that he died two years ago and using the alias Doug Crowley. He then kills Camilla Figg to put pressure on Dexter. After Dexter and his family go on a trip to Key West, he follows and kills the detective investigating Dexter, leaving the corpse in Dexter's hotel room. He then kidnaps Astor and tries to take her to Garden Key on a stolen boat. Dexter manages to get on the boat before they escape and ends up pushing Bernard overboard, where he is bitten in half by a shark, witnessed by Dexter and Astor.
- Alissa Elan is Bernard Elan's ex-wife, who he is still living with due to not having the money to live elsewhere. Despite not having a job, she blames him for not having his own money (according to him). Bernard later kills her after she demands he move out, leaving the body for Dexter to find.
- Richard Hood is the detective investigating the murder of Camilla Figg. Knowing that she had a crush on Dexter, and with some more indications planted by Bernard Elan, he suspects Dexter of being the killer. He follows Dexter to Key West to continue investigating, only to be killed by Elan, who leaves his body in Dexter's hotel room. After Dexter resolves the matter of his stalker, he plants child pornography, and images suggesting Hood and Camilla were in a relationship, on Hood's computer, sending the investigation in a new direction.
- Douglas "Doug" Crowley is a man whose identity Bernard Elan stole after planting evidence that he himself had been dead for years. Dexter, believing Crowley is the one stalking him and knowing he cannot deal with the problem himself due to Detective Hood watching him, asks his brother Brian to handle the problem. Brian agrees, but kills the real Doug Crowley instead of the imposter.
- Steven "Steve" Valentine is a man who works as a clown and has killed a few boys who he entertained. Dexter kills him at the beginning of Double Dexter, but this is witnessed by Bernard Elan, leading to the story.
- Jacqueline "Jackie" Forrest is an actress on the police procedural who will play a cop. However, when evidence is discovered that someone is stalking her and killing women who look like her, she enlists Dexter as a bodyguard. He accompanies her back to her hotel room, where he starts to become enamoured with her and her lifestyle. They eventually have an affair, and he starts to fall in love with her and considers leaving Rita. Deborah becomes disgusted when he admits this to her. He eventually kills her stalker, but she is later found dead after the death of her assistant, which he assumed was unrelated, putting him under suspicion. After the real murderer is stopped, Dexter is arrested due to circumstantial evidence.
- Robert Chase is an actor on the police procedural who shadows Dexter to learn about being a forensic technician. Dexter feels something off about him, but assumes he is gay and attracted to him. He is at one point seen with Astor in a dressing room. After Astor's disappearance and Jackie's murder, Dexter discovers from the producer that Robert is a pedophile. Now knowing the truth, he tracks them to the new house he and Rita bought, only to be knocked out by Robert. Robert has lured Astor with promises of stardom, but Dexter states that after everything, Robert will be arrested, causing him to try to take Astor hostage. Astor responds by killing him. He is afterward shown to have already killed Rita when she arrived ahead of Dexter, and due to circumstantial evidence, Dexter is charged with the murders of Robert's victims, as well as Robert himself.
- Katherine "Kathy" Podrowski is Jackie's assistant, who manages her calendar. When Dexter guards Jackie, she stays in a hotel room below theirs. She at one point becomes concerned when she sees Robert and Astor together in a dressing room. After Dexter discreetly kills Jackie's stalker, he assumes she is safe, only for Kathy to be killed the next day. Dexter initially suspects someone else, but discovers that Robert is the killer as she knew about his attraction to young girls and saw him with Astor.
- Patrick Bergmann is a stalker who kills women because they look like Jackie. After Dexter is assigned to guard Jackie in her hotel room, he discovers who Patrick is, and discreetly slips away, kills him and disposes of the body.
- Renny Bordreaux is an actor and comedian who arrives in Miami for a show around the time a police procedural is being filmed. Rita finds him funny. When Dexter attends his show, he sees in Renny's eyes that Renny has his own Dark Passenger. Later, after Jackie is killed, Dexter suspects it could be Renny, and says so, but is informed that Renny left Miami on his tour before the murder occurred. He tends to end his comedic lines with the phrase "I'm just sayin".
- Detective Anderson is a detective investigating the murders Dexter supposedly committed. He dislikes Dexter, and adjusts the evidence to make it seem as though he was the murderer. After Dexter is bailed out, he attempts to frame Dexter for stealing drugs to get him back into jail. Dexter later arranges his death by setting him up to go to a hotel room where drug cartel hitmen will be waiting. He succeeds, but Anderson manages to kill both hitmen before he dies, surprising Dexter. Dexter arranges the scene to look as though Anderson was buying drugs from the cartel, discrediting him posthumously.
- Bernard "Bernie" Feldman is the public defender assigned to Dexter's case when he is charged with murder. He visits Dexter in jail, but Dexter notes he doesn't seem prepared or hopeful. He is later replaced after Brian pays for a top-notch defense attorney to represent Dexter.
- Frances "Frank" Kraunauer is a high-priced criminal attorney who Brian pays to represent Dexter in Dexter Is Dead. He gets Dexter out of jail, and meets with him regularly, knowing he is being railroaded. However, Dexter and Brian eventually deduce that he is in the pocket of the Mexican drug cartel who want Brian dead for stealing money from them, and that he is giving them Dexter's location so he will lead them to Brian. They confirm this by setting up Detective Anderson to meet the cartel, and after this proves their theory and the children are kidnapped, the two set Kraunauer up to meet in a public place, but after two failed attempts to kill Dexter, the cartel sends some hitmen with him to the meeting and a fight ensues, leaving Kraunauer dead.
- Raul "The Butcher" is a Mexican drug lord who Brian once worked for. Having fought with another drug lord, Brian thought Raul would lose, so he and another member stole a lot of money and fled. However, Raul ended up winning the war and absorbing the other drug lord's remaining empire into his own, and began hunting Brian for revenge. Eventually, he has Astor, Cody, Lily Anne and Nicholas kidnapped to force Dexter to cooperate. However, after interrogating one of his men for their location, Dexter and Brian bring Deborah to it, a yacht, and save the children. Brian then attempts to kill him but is himself killed by a bomb which also injures Dexter. Raul then attempts to kill Dexter but is shot dead by Deborah.
- Santo Rojo Spanish for The Red Saint. He was a Mexican drug lord who was in competition with Raul. Brian thought he would win, and fled with Raul's money. However, Raul managed to plant a bomb in Santo Rojo's headquarters, killing the rival drug lord and many of his men, causing the rest to flock to him, leaving Brian on the run.
- Octavio is Brian Moser's friend who told him where Raul kept a large stash of money and fled with him when it looked like their side would lose the war. After Raul wins, he has Brian and Octavio hunted for revenge. After Dexter is set up at a hotel, he meets his lawyer to talk about his case. Heading back to the hotel, he finds Octavio's corpse and that of another man in his room and deduces they killed each other. He calls Brian, who helps dispose of the corpses and then tells him about the Mexican cartel he is in trouble with.
- Ivan is a henchman of Raul who was sent to kill Brian as revenge for stealing from him. When Dexter and Brian arrange to meet Kraunauer in a public place, the lawyer brings other cartel members, including Ivan, with him. When the meeting goes badly, Kraunauer and the cartel members are killed, except for Ivan, whom Dexter and Brian take back to a warehouse, where they torture him until he gives up the location of the children Raul has had kidnapped, and then kill him.
