= Miami Vice (Dexter: Original Sin) =

- Dexter: Original Sin episode
- Episode no.: Episode 3
- Directed by: Monica Raymund
- Written by: Safura Fadavi
- Cinematography by: Edward J. Pei
- Editing by: Louis Cioffi
- Original air date: December 20, 2024
- Running time: 58 minutes

Guest appearances
- Sarah Michelle Gellar as Tanya Martin (special guest star); Brittany Allen as Laura Moser; Aaron Jennings as Clark Sanders; Raquel Justice as Sofia Rivera; Carlo Mendez as Hector Estrada; Randy Gonzalez as Santos Jimenez; Roberto Sanchez as Tony Ferrer

Episode chronology
← Previous "Kid in a Candy Store"	Next → "Fender Bender"

"Miami Vice" is the third episode of the American crime drama mystery television series Dexter: Original Sin, prequel to Dexter. The episode was written by co-executive producer Safura Fadavi, and directed by Monica Raymund. It was released on Paramount+ with Showtime on December 20, 2024, and airing on Showtime two days later.

The series explores a young Dexter Morgan, as he begins working as a forensic blood spatter analyst at the Miami Metro Police Department. It also explores his inner conflicts, wherein he begins his days as serial killer. In the episode, Dexter begins tracking Tony Ferrer, while flashbacks depict Harry's cooperation with Laura Moser in infiltrating Hector Estrada's gang.

The episode received positive reviews from critics, who considered it an improvement over the previous episodes, highlighting its performances and character development as strong points.

== Plot ==
Spencer (Patrick Dempsey) releases a statement regarding Jimmy's kidnapping, promising to find him and apprehend those responsible. As the police work on new strategies, they meet the new Detective, María LaGuerta (Christina Milian). While Spencer is impressed by her determination, he is upset about her remarks where she criticizes Miami Metro's incompetence.

Dexter (Patrick Gibson) begins stalking Tony Ferrer (Roberto Sanchez), and sneaks into his house to look for evidence he's a murderer. He finds a diary, which contains the people indebted with Ferrer, finding multiple people who were reported missing or dead. He has Masuka (Alex Shimizu) make him a fake ID, using the name Patrick Bateman. He goes to a jai alai game to watch Ferrer in the audience. He tries to make conversation with him, but Ferrer believes he is only speaking to him to ask for a loan. Dexter asks for one, and Ferrer agrees to give him a $500 loan, asking him for 10% of the payment by that Friday.

Debra (Molly Brown) convinces a few classmates to come to her house with the promises of cocaine. When she and her friend Sofia (Raquel Justice) come home, Dexter is startled to see that Sofia has the earrings he took from Nurse Mary. He confronts Debra for stealing them, and she agrees to get them back for him if he can get her the cocaine. Dexter lies by claiming that he was buying the earrings for their mom, and helps Debra create fake cocaine for the party. He then buys Sofia new earrings, and she returns Nurse Mary's earrings.

In flashbacks, Harry (Christian Slater) has Laura Moser (Brittany Allen) infiltrate Hector Estrada's gang, obtaining money to identify their fingerprints. He later has her wear a wire to a meeting with Estrada, but the operation takes a turn when she is taken by Estrada's associate, Santos Jimenez, to a shipyard. Harry follows her but loses track of the car. He returns to the motel to file a BOLO, when Laura suddenly returns, having successfully convinced Estrada's associates that she is reliable. While Laura suggests they could stay at the hotel, a tempted Harry reluctantly declines her advances.

Ferrer confronts Dexter for lack of payment, aims his gun at Dexter, then shoots a tree next to him, warning him to get the payment the following day. Dexter takes the bullet and uses the lab to examine its striations and corroborate that it came from the same gun as the one used in the murders. He shows this to Harry, who is furious that he risked his life and further disappointed to learn he is still going after more criminals. Harry offers to accompany him, but Dexter declines, not wanting Harry to be associated as he does not think he could handle it. That night, Dexter sneaks into Ferrer's house and subdues him, taking him to a kill room he had set up in the jai alai venue. Despite Ferrer's pleas, Dexter kills him. He dumps his body in the swamp, as well as Nurse Mary's earrings, taking heed of Harry's warning about not taking trophies. However, Dexter fails to notice Ferrer's arm resurfacing as Dexter leaves.

== Production ==
=== Development ===
The episode was written by co-executive producer Safura Fadavi, and directed by Monica Raymund. This was Fadavi's first writing credit, and Raymund's first directing credit.

=== Writing ===
The episode introduces a young version of María LaGuerta. Actress Christina Milian explained her character, "Maria LaGuerta's purpose is to be purposeful. As the newbie in Miami Metro, it's a tough point for her. It's the ’90s. You understand what the positioning was for her. She has to prove herself, and it's not only proving herself to everybody else, but she really wants to figure out what's going on. She wants to solve the crimes. At the end of the day, that's what her focus is. She plays no games." She added, "They're all detectives, and she's the one female homicide detective, the first one to walk into this office to the bullpen. So she's not going to get it easy, but I like that she earns it."

== Reception ==
"Miami Vice" received positive reviews from critics. Louis Peitzman of Vulture gave the episode a 3 star rating out of 5 and wrote, "Three episodes into Dexter: Original Sin, it's clear the show has a good sense of humor about itself — this episode has a lot of talking-parrot moments — and also isn't afraid to embrace the gruesomeness of the original series. But as we delve further into flashbacks involving Harry and his doomed informant, Laura Moser, it's becoming less clear what story the show is trying to tell that we don't already know. At least “Miami Vice” delivers a brand-new victim for Dexter's burgeoning serial-killer journey, not to mention the first time I've seen a jai alai ball used as a weapon in anything."

Callum Murray of Game Rant wrote, "Overall, Miami Vice is the strongest of the first three episodes, and if it carries on this way, it's going to be one hell of a season."

Greg MacArthur of Screen Rant wrote, "Dexter: Original Sin episode 3 has successfully replaced the initial anticipatory questions of the series' quality with genuine intrigue about where the story is headed next, feeling more and more like a vintage Dexter season with each passing scene." Mads Misasi of Telltale TV gave the episode a 4.5 star rating out of 5 and wrote, "this episode does a great job of showing just how Dexter learns how to be more human. It further develops his learning curve while also expanding on the Dexter and Deb dynamic that has been seriously lacking so far."
