= The Big Bad Body Problem =

- Dexter: Original Sin episode
- Episode no.: Episode 7
- Directed by: Monica Raymund
- Written by: Katrina Mathewson; Tanner Bean
- Cinematography by: J. Michael Muro
- Editing by: Perri Frank; Sean Cusack
- Original air date: January 24, 2025
- Running time: 48 minutes

Guest appearances
- Sarah Michelle Gellar as Tanya Martin (special guest star); Brittany Allen as Laura Moser; Raquel Justice as Sofia Rivera; Eli Sherman as Little Dexter; Isaac Gonzalez Rossi as Gio; London Thatcher as Nicky Spencer; Roberto Sanchez as Tony Ferrer; Jasper Lewis as Doris Morgan; Jeff Daniel Phillips as Levi Reed; Aaron Jennings as Clark Sanders; Carlo Mendez as Hector Estrada; Randy Gonzalez as Santos Jimenez

Episode chronology
← Previous "The Joy of Killing"	Next → "Business and Pleasure"

"The Big Bad Body Problem" is the seventh episode of the American crime drama mystery television series Dexter: Original Sin, prequel to Dexter. The episode was written by supervising producers Katrina Mathewson and Tanner Bean, and directed by Monica Raymund. It was released on Paramount+ with Showtime on January 24, 2025, and airing on Showtime two days later.

The series explores a young Dexter Morgan, as he begins working as a forensic blood spatter analyst at the Miami Metro Police Department. It also explores his inner conflicts, wherein he begins his days as serial killer. In the episode, Dexter tries to find a place to dispose of his victims, while the search for Nicky intensifies. In flashbacks, Laura Moser is introduced to Hector Estrada.

The episode received mixed to positive reviews from critics; while some found the twist ending interesting, some also considered it predictable.

== Plot ==
Dexter (Patrick Gibson) is asked by the police trooper to leave the crime scene, but he uses his Miami Metro connection to be allowed entrance, despite carrying Levi Reed's body in his truck. Dexter is asked by Masuka (Alex Shimizu) to collect the fingerprints from the severed arm, which Dexter deduces belonged to Tony Ferrer. Knowing this could lead the police to himself, Dexter throws the arm into the swamp, where an alligator eats it.

The following morning, Dexter takes Levi Reed's corpse to a garbage dump, where it is disposed in the local trash center. Harry (Christian Slater) scolds Dexter for risking exposure by taking the body to a crime scene. At Miami Metro, Dexter begins to think about new ways to dispose of his victims. During this, he finds Angel (James Martinez) still investigating the scene, convinced that the severed arm belonged to Tony Ferrer. To get him off the case, Dexter convinces Angel not to waste his time investigating the murder of a criminal like Ferrer, as Ferrer's victims will finally find peace with his death.

In flashbacks, Laura (Brittany Allen) is feeling exhausted by her informant role, which has taken place over an entire year. Harry promises to let her go when she catches Hector Estrada talking about his operations with a wire. On her way home, Laura is stopped by Santos Jimenez, who forces her to come with him in a car to Estrada's mansion. Laura meets Estrada (Carlo Mendez) at his pool, where he explains he simply wanted to make sure he trusted her. He asks her to supervise a delivery in the shipyard in a few days, and she agrees, hoping he will be there. After she leaves, Estrada assigns Santos to watch her.

Held in captivity, Nicky (London Thatcher) makes a handmade knife to attack his captor, but is punished by having his finger cut off. The finger is sent to Miami Metro, where Tanya (Sarah Michelle Gellar) confirms it was Nicky's finger. However, Dexter finds blood on the outside of the box and runs it from a blood slide, believing this could lead to the captor's ID. Meanwhile, Harry and LaGuerta (Christina Milian) pursue a black car that was used to kidnap Nicky and Jimmy, believing they have found a lead with the car's previous owner.

Debra (Molly Brown) applies for a sports scholarship, but her friendship with Sofia (Raquel Justice) becomes strained when Sofia begins to believes Dexter is cheating on her and Debra does not support her. When Debra's rival, Tiffany, confronts Debra for damaging her car, Debra hits her, getting her kicked off of the team and ruining her chance at a scholarship. Harry is upset with her, but Debra is indifferent about the situation, and decides to leave the house to see Gio (Isaac Gonzalez Rossi). Dexter arrives at the lab, to find Spencer (Patrick Dempsey), who is losing confidence in finding his son. Dexter tells Spencer that he found a hesitation cut in Nicky's finger but not in Jimmy's, suggesting that the captor might know Nicky. Dexter takes note of an injury to Spencer's arm, quickly deducing that Spencer might be the captor. At a store, Spencer is seen buying the same meal that the captor gave to Nicky and Jimmy.

== Production ==
=== Development ===
The episode was written by supervising producers Katrina Mathewson and Tanner Bean, and directed by Monica Raymund. This was Mathewson's second writing credit, Bean's second writing credit, and Raymund's third directing credit.

== Reception ==
"The Big Bad Body Problem" received mixed reviews from critics. Louis Peitzman of Vulture gave the episode a 2 star rating out of 5 and wrote, "I love it when things wrap up nicely, don't you? That's not what's happening on Dexter: Original Sin, but it's still pleasant to think about. To be fair, we are getting forward momentum here — and seven episodes into the season, I should certainly hope so. The resolutions themselves, however, are mostly clunky, reflecting the overall clumsiness of the season. There are times when this half-assed storytelling works, especially when we're all ready to move on to the next plotline, but in “The Big Bad Body Problem,” I found myself troubled by a nagging feeling that these writers think we're dumb."

Callum Murray of Game Rant wrote, "The big reveal is shocking but fairly predictable, but it could pave the way for Tom Matthews' introduction into the series, and that is exciting for fans."

Greg MacArthur of Screen Rant wrote, "Now that it's certain Aaron is the main kidnapper and murderer, his motive remains the biggest mystery about his character, along with what Dexter plans to do about him. News of a police captain turned murderer would leave a stain on Miami Metro for life. It will be interesting to see from this point forward whether Dexter will intervene and frame Aaron's potential death as a murder or even an accident to preserve the integrity of Miami Metro." Mads Misasi of Telltale TV gave the episode a perfect 5 star rating out of 5 and wrote, "One of the things that made Dexter so great all those years ago was its ability to make viewers feel comfortable in their knowledge and understanding before twisting things around with an amazing reveal. Having the prequel series do that as well shows the writers and creators know the source material and the universe it resides in. This is why this show goes above and beyond what we've come to expect from prequel and sequel TV series."
