= Business and Pleasure (Dexter: Original Sin) =

- Dexter: Original Sin episode
- Harry Morgan (Christian Slater) reading concerned Brian Moser's (Roby Attal) patient file secretly from María LaGuerta (Christina Milian).
- Episode no.: Episode 8
- Directed by: Monica Raymund
- Story by: Mary Leah Sutton; Johanna Ramm
- Teleplay by: Mary Leah Sutton
- Cinematography by: J. Michael Muro
- Editing by: Katie Ennis; Liz Vendetti
- Original air date: January 31, 2025
- Running time: 51 minutes

Guest appearances
- Sarah Michelle Gellar as Tanya Martin (special guest star); Brittany Allen as Laura Moser; Jonathan Adams as Assistant Chief Carl Borlee; Raquel Justice as Sofia Rivera; Eli Sherman as Little Dexter; Isaac Gonzalez Rossi as Gio; Ana Ciubara as Ariana; London Thatcher as Nicky Spencer; Sarah Kinsey as Camilla Figg; Carlo Mendez as Hector Estrada; Randy Gonzalez as Santos Jimenez; Sean Burgos as Detective Raymond; Jeff Campanella as Detective Bean

Episode chronology
← Previous "The Big Bad Body Problem"	Next → "Blood Drive"

"Business and Pleasure" is the eighth episode of the American crime drama mystery television series Dexter: Original Sin, prequel to Dexter. The episode was written by executive producer Mary Leah Sutton from a story by Sutton and Johanna Ramm, and directed by Monica Raymund. It was released on Paramount+ with Showtime on January 31, 2025, and airing on Showtime two days later.

The series explores a young Dexter Morgan, as he begins working as a forensic blood spatter analyst at the Miami Metro Police Department. It also explores his inner conflicts, wherein he begins his days as serial killer. In the episode, Dexter begins to follow Spencer, while also trying to find Debra. Flashbacks depict Laura's last encounter with Harry before Estrada and Jimenez discover her betrayal.

The episode received mostly positive reviews from critics, who praised its performances, pacing, shootout scene and flashbacks.

== Plot ==
Wearing the ski mask, Spencer (Patrick Dempsey) delivers food and water to Nicky (London Thatcher), who passes out as Spencer has drugged his water. After Nicky becomes unconscious, Spencer takes one of Nicky's shirts.

Dexter (Patrick Gibson) tells Harry (Christian Slater) of his suspicion that Spencer might have kidnapped Nicky. Harry bluntly dismisses him, and orders him to find Debra (Molly Brown), who has not returned home. Debra has left with Gio (Isaac Gonzalez Rossi), who has taken her to a yacht in Bimini. As he finds Gio's address, Dexter is tasked by Spencer to review old files, concluding that Spencer wants him distracted. Dexter follows Spencer, seeing him deliver a bag to a young woman, who, along with a man, take it inside a house.

Harry and LaGuerta (Christina Milian) go to Tampa to visit Paul Petrie, the previous owner of the car used in the kidnappings. However, they learn that he was murdered a few weeks ago. As they browse his files with the names of his patients, Harry is disturbed to find "Moser, B." as one of his patients. After sending LaGuerta away, he checks the file, and is shocked to learn that Brian has been discharged from his mental institution. Harry rips out a page mentioning himself, and discovers that one of the nurses attending Brian was murdered.

Dexter visits Gio's address, finding his fiancée Ariana living there, who reveals she is aware of Gio's relationship with Debra. Dexter borrows Camila's boat, using it to follow Debra and Gio to Bimini. When Debra enters the cabin of Gio's yacht to retrieve her jacket, she finds drug contraband there. Gio enters and angrily confronts her, kicking her off of his yacht and leaving her on Bimini. Dexter finds her and takes her back to Miami. On the way back, Debra throws a bracelet that Gio gave her into the ocean, although she regrets not pawning it. This gives Dexter the idea that he can dispose of his victim's bodies at sea.

Miami Metro is tasked with raiding a cartel stash house where Nicky is suspected of being held, which is the same house Dexter had followed Spencer to earlier. The police raid the house, but find no trace of Nicky aside from one of his shirts. Spencer turns aggressive, furiously threatening the cartel members with a gun, causing one of them to pull a gun, which sparks a shootout. Many cartel members are killed and Bobby (Reno Wilson) is severely wounded. Spencer hands Nicky's shirt to forensics, and is also forced to hand over his gun. As he inspects the scene, Dexter finds the bag that Spencer had delivered to the house, realizing that he orchestrated everything. He laments not having stopped Spencer in time, which could have prevented Bobby from being wounded, recognizing that he sees darkness in those around him.

In flashbacks, Laura (Brittany Allen) meets with Harry at a park, explaining that Hector Estrada assigned her to supervise a drug shipment. Unbeknownst to them, Santos Jimenez (Randy Gonzalez) is watching them from afar. At her house, Laura, Dexter and Brian are ambushed and subdued by Jimenez and his henchmen. That night, Harry and Bobby arrive at Laura's house, finding it empty with signs of a struggle. Laura, Dexter and Brian are taken to a shipyard, locked in a container with other intended victims of Estrada (Carlo Mendez), who arrives and expresses his disappointment to Laura about her betrayal. On his orders, Jimenez begins to dismember one of the victims alive with a chainsaw. As a horrified Laura attempts to cover her children's eyes, a shocked Dexter looks on at the murder taking place.

== Production ==
=== Development ===
The episode was written by executive producer Mary Leah Sutton from a story by Sutton and Johanna Ramm, and directed by Monica Raymund. This was Sutton's first writing credit, Ramm's first writing credit, and Raymund's fourth directing credit.

== Reception ==
"Business and Pleasure" received mostly positive reviews from critics. Louis Peitzman of Vulture gave the episode a 4 star rating out of 5 and wrote, "This far into the first season of Dexter: Original Sin, I'm discovering there may be a ceiling to my enjoyment of this show. Beyond the classic drawbacks of the prequel genre, there are persistent tonal issues, sloppy writing, and plotlines that just don't work (sorry, Sofia). All that being said, I have to acknowledge “Business and Pleasure” as the strongest episode so far, propelling the plot forward with bursts of action alongside meaningful character moments. It may be time to accept that this show has much more in common with the deeply flawed later seasons of Dexter than the first four — and start grading on a curve accordingly."

Callum Murray of Game Rant wrote, "Original Sin tries to juggle too many villains and fan service in this episode, and the result is very mixed, while still being an entertaining hour of television."

Greg MacArthur of Screen Rant wrote, "While the significance of Michael C. Hall's voiceover narration may seem to have faded since episode 1, it still authenticates Gibson's great acting and the entire prequel series at large. If it wasn't already clear, Dexter: Original Sin episode 8 offers all the evidence needed for Paramount to approve season 2." Mads Misasi of Telltale TV gave the episode a 4.5 star rating out of 5 and wrote, "It isn't very often that a prequel series stands up to the original. Fortunately for us, Dexter: Original Sin Season 1 Episode 8, “Business and Pleasure,” further proves that this prequel is at the top of its game."
