= Code Blues =

- Dexter: Original Sin episode
- Harry Morgan (Christian Slater) confronting Brian Moser (Roby Attal) for trying to get close to his brother Dexter Morgan (Patrick Gibson).
- Episode no.: Episode 10
- Directed by: Michael Lehmann
- Story by: Clyde Phillips; Alexandra Franklin; Marc Muszynski
- Teleplay by: Clyde Phillips
- Cinematography by: Edward J. Pei
- Editing by: Perri Frank
- Original air date: February 14, 2025
- Running time: 50 minutes

Guest appearances
- Sarah Michelle Gellar as Tanya Martin (special guest star); Roby Attal as Brian Moser; Kathleen Rose Perkins as Barbara; Eli Sherman as Little Dexter; London Thatcher as Nicky Spencer; Jasper Lewis as Doris Morgan; Raquel Justice as Sofia Rivera; Amanda Brooks as Becca Spencer; Sarah Kinsey as Camilla Figg; Aaron Jennings as Clark Sanders

Episode chronology
← Previous "Blood Drive"	Next → —

"Code Blues" is the tenth episode and series finale of the American crime drama mystery television series Dexter: Original Sin, prequel to Dexter. The episode was written by series creator Clyde Phillips from a story by Phillips, producer Alexandra Franklin and producer Marc Muszynski, and directed by executive producer Michael Lehmann. It was released on Paramount+ with Showtime on February 14, 2025, and airing on Showtime two days later.

The series explores a young Dexter Morgan, as he begins working as a forensic blood spatter analyst at the Miami Metro Police Department. It also explores his inner conflicts, wherein he begins his days as a serial killer. In the episode, Dexter pursues Spencer in order to locate Nicky's cell, while Brian tries to get close to Dexter.

The episode received positive reviews from critics, who praised the performances, themes and character development, although many still expressed dissatisfaction with Spencer's motives.

== Plot ==
Talking with his therapist, Brian (Roby Attal) relates how after the Morgans sent him away, he was put into a series of different foster homes. Due to his violent behavior, he was placed in Harbor Light Mental Hospital, where he was diagnosed with antisocial personality disorder. As an adult, Brian violently confronts his nurse for depriving him of his medicine for the past months. The therapist, Paul Petrie, is content with Brian's progress, but warns him not to contact Dexter (Patrick Gibson). Upset, Brian brutally kills him and steals his car.

Dexter follows Spencer (Patrick Dempsey) to a ship at the docks, which is just half a mile from the police station. Dexter once again, attacks Spencer and the two engage in a fight before Spencer begins flooding Nicky's cell, revealing his suspicion to Dexter that Nicky is not his biological son. Spencer flees, and Dexter is forced to let him go in order to save Nicky from drowning, though the latter loses consciousness in the process. Dexter takes Nicky outside and uses a flare gun to alert authorities of his location before fleeing the scene.

While visiting Bobby (Reno Wilson), LaGuerta (Christina Milian) tells Harry (Christian Slater) that Barbara has been murdered, and he realizes Brian is responsible. While surveying the crime scene, Harry notices Brian on the roof of a nearby building, awaiting Dexter's arrival. Harry confronts Brian at gunpoint, finally connecting him to the two other murders and it is revealed they were bullies from his foster homes. Brian reveals he already met Dexter, (Note: Revealed to be the man running into him at the restaurant in "Kid in a Candy Store".) and is upset to have found that Dexter has forgotten he had a brother. Brian confronts Harry for not telling Dexter of his affair with Laura, and how forcing her to become an informant led to her death. Brian refuses to surrender and asks Harry to kill him instead. Harry hesitates, and Brian takes advantage of this, knocking Harry unconscious and escaping.

Spencer breaks into Becca's house and attacks her boyfriend Nelson, confronting her over lying to him about Nicky's true paternity. Dexter subdues Spencer again and removes him from the house, seeing a report of Barbara's murder on TV as he does so. Dexter places Spencer on a kill table he had set up on Camilla's boat. Dexter taunts Spencer for ruining his own legacy and Spencer claims that Harry has failed him, which Dexter dismisses before killing Spencer and dumping his body into the ocean. When he returns home, Harry expresses his regret over not having listened to Dexter when he expressed his suspicions about Spencer, acknowledging that Nicky would have been rescued earlier if he had. Dexter tells Harry he killed Spencer, revealing he saved Nicky as well. Harry is shaken at realizing his lifelong friend was a monster, but Dexter reiterates he was not born like that, unlike Dexter himself. Despite knowing Dexter was affected by his mother's death, Harry comforts him.

The following morning, Debra (Molly Brown) and Sofia (Raquel Justice) reconcile. At Miami Metro, Harry and Angel (James Martinez) discuss Spencer's whereabouts, and Harry dismisses the serial killer case despite LaGuerta's report. Unbeknownst to them, LaGuerta overhears this, and walks away disappointed. Tanya (Sarah Michelle Gellar) informs Dexter that he has been approved to join forensics full-time, officially becoming part of Miami Metro. After Bobby recovers, Debra tells Harry that she has enrolled in the police academy, which Harry approves. In private, Harry expresses pride in Dexter for prioritizing Nicky's safety over pursuing Spencer, deeming that his Code belongs to Dexter. Dexter and Harry join Debra for a dance, with Dexter narrating that despite his fears, the one thing that could save him is family. Outside, Brian watches them from afar.

== Production ==
=== Development ===
The episode was written by series creator Clyde Phillips from a story by Phillips, producer Alexandra Franklin and producer Marc Muszynski, and directed by executive producer Michael Lehmann. This was Phillips' second writing credit, Franklin's second writing credit, Muszynski's second writing credit, and Lehmann's sixth directing credit.

=== Writing ===
On Dexter's decision to ignore Harry's orders and kill Spencer, Patrick Gibson said, "As we see later in the original series, kids are kind of the one place where Dexter starts to feel human. But I also think it's important that he goes against his dad's word when it comes to Spencer. Not for the first time, but definitely when it comes to a kill. It's always taken Harry's permission to kill, that's part of the code, and so this is Dexter kind of flying out of the nest. He made a decision, and it was the right one, and I think it gives him that autonomy and that sense of confidence that he is ready." He added, "It's that final moment where he becomes the master of his own fate rather than just having Harry mold and shape him."

Gibson offered his own interpretation of Harry lying to Dexter over his origin, "to see Harry be able to lie to Dexter like that says a lot about Harry. Like in that early scene, when Dexter's like, 'So nurse Mary's gone, nothing to worry about. This is great. See you later, dad. Good night!' and Harry breaks down in tears, Harry can't really face that he is, in a way, Dr. Frankenstein. And that a lot of this falls on his shoulders. And so for him to tell Dexter that he's born this way sort of helps relieve that guilt that he may have actually created this monster."

Originally, the final scene would include Brian with a passport, before boarding a taxi. However, Phillips decided to omit that element, choosing to focus on Dexter, Harry and Debra dancing together instead.

== Reception ==
"Code Blues" received positive reviews from critics. Louis Peitzman of Vulture gave the episode a 3 star rating out of 5 and wrote, "At the risk of being branded a hater, it's clear to me that the series bit off more than it could chew. To its credit, Original Sin has tried to stretch the limits of what a prequel can do, but as “Code Blues” reinforces, that's often at the expense of coherent plotting and basic logic."

Callum Murray of Game Rant wrote, "The explanation of his motive for killing his other victims feels a bit too rushed, and on the nose, but aside from that, the 10-minute opening sequence does a good job of setting up future events. Overall, an entertaining final episode, and a promise of more action to come, but now it's all about Michael C. Hall's return in Resurrection this summer."

Greg MacArthur of Screen Rant wrote, "In short, Dexter: Original Sin is a triumph for the Dexter franchise and a blueprint for all modern prequel series. It expertly captured the feel of the original show and brilliantly cast returning and brand-new characters, resulting in one of the best Dexter seasons ever made. Expanding the backstories of Laura, Harry, and Brian is what prequel shows like these are all about." Mads Misasi of Telltale TV gave the episode a perfect 5 star rating out of 5 and wrote, "A finale episode should always do a great job of wrapping things up while also leaving enough on the table to continue the story, should the show get another season. Such is the case with Dexter: Original Sin Season 1 Episode 10, “Code Blues.”"
