= Fender Bender (Dexter: Original Sin) =

- Dexter: Original Sin episode
- Episode no.: Episode 4
- Directed by: Monica Raymund
- Written by: Nick Zayas
- Cinematography by: Edward J. Pei
- Editing by: Perri Frank
- Original air date: December 27, 2024
- Running time: 50 minutes

Guest appearances
- Sarah Michelle Gellar as Tanya Martin (special guest star); Joe Pantoliano as Mad Dog; Brittany Allen as Laura Moser; Raquel Justice as Sofia Rivera; Sarah Kinsey as Camilla Figg; Aaron Jennings as Clark Sanders; Isaac Gonzalez Rossi as Gio; Amanda Brooks as Becca Spencer; Eli Sherman as Young Dexter; London Thatcher as Nicky Spencer; Roberto Sanchez as Tony Ferrer

Episode chronology
← Previous "Miami Vice"	Next → "F Is for Fuck Up"

"Fender Bender" is the fourth episode of the American crime drama mystery television series Dexter: Original Sin, prequel to Dexter. The episode was written by producer Nick Zayas, and directed by Monica Raymund. It was released on Paramount+ with Showtime on December 27, 2024, and airing on Showtime two days later.

The series explores a young Dexter Morgan, as he begins working as a forensic blood spatter analyst at the Miami Metro Police Department. It also explores his inner conflicts, wherein he begins his days as serial killer. In the episode, Dexter is shaken upon discovering Jimmy Powell's corpse, and decides to track the killer, suspected of being a former mob contract killer.

The episode received mixed-to-positive reviews from critics, although Joe Pantoliano received high praise for his guest appearance.

== Plot ==
Miami Metro is called to a crime scene, where a child's body has been found hanging from a bridge. Upon further analysis, they identify it as Jimmy Powell. Dexter (Patrick Gibson) is shaken upon seeing the body, much to his own surprise. Comforting him, Harry (Christian Slater) decides to send Dexter to aid María LaGuerta (Christina Milian) in another murder case.

That night, Dexter confides to Harry that he wants to kill whoever murdered Jimmy. While Harry is still shaken over his son's activities, he agrees to help him. Dexter finds a possible lead, a man called Mad Dog (Joe Pantoliano), who was suspected of being a contract killer for the mob and has been linked to murders from the 1970s. Harry makes it clear that he cannot have his blessing until he is certain that Mad Dog is responsible. Dexter visits Mad Dog at his yacht club, making an appointment to charter his boat. He sneaks into Mad Dog's house, finding a shredded photo of a child. Upon piecing the shredded photo together, Dexter discovers the photo is of Omar Reyes, a witness in a RICO case, determining that he is Mad Dog's next target.

Debra (Molly Brown) and Sofia (Raquel Justice) feel sidelined by their volleyball team, despite the fact that Debra is the team's captain. Hoping to earn a good reputation, Debra meets with a Blockbuster employee, who sells her cocaine. Debra intends to use this to win over her friends, but also begins using it. At a nightclub, she catches the attention of a wealthy young man named Gio (Isaac Gonzalez Rossi) who invites her to his penthouse.

In flashbacks, Harry and Wyatt (Reno Wilson) pursue Zenny Hernandez, a close associate of Estrada. They meet with Laura (Brittany Allen) to set up a meeting with Zenny, but she is unable to leave as her babysitter is unavailable. Harry then decides to babysit Dexter and Brian, allowing her to go. Harry bonds with Dexter, helping him understand the concept of death when he finds Dexter trying to revive a lizard that Brian killed. When Laura returns, she proclaims that she earned Zenny's trust and he has assigned her to move more products into Miami. She makes advances towards Harry who initially tries to resist, but he gives in and the two end up kissing passionately.

Dexter presents the evidence to Harry, explaining that Reyes has a family. Harry reluctantly gives him his blessing, but maintains that Dexter cannot compete with a professional like Mad Dog. Dexter arrives for his appointment, but finds that Mad Dog invited a family to join them for the charter, ruining his plan to kill him. While talking with Dexter, Mad Dog opens up about his past as a "real estate" agent, feeling no remorse for foreclosing on those who "deserved it." That night, Dexter subdues Mad Dog at his house by breaking a guitar on his head. As Dexter is securing him to his kill table, Mad Dog quickly regains consciousness and attacks Dexter before escaping. Dexter pursues him in the street, until a car hits Mad Dog, shocking him.

== Production ==
=== Development ===
The episode was written by producer Nick Zayas, and directed by Monica Raymund. This was Zayas' first writing credit, and Raymund's second directing credit.

=== Writing ===
Executive producer Scott Reynolds explained that Dexter's reaction to Jimmy Powell's death echoes his past when his mother was murdered. He added that the theme is seen in the scene where a young Dexter tries to revive a dying lizard, "I don't think Dexter thinks he could've done that, cause he's forgotten all of that. He's defined himself by the current psychology of 1991 that you're sick in the head. Maybe he wasn't quite born this way, maybe this tragedy it happened to him, twisted and turned him into something else."

=== Casting ===
In July 2024, it was announced that Joe Pantoliano would recur in the series as Mad Dog.

== Reception ==
"Fender Bender" received mixed-to-positive reviews from critics. Louis Peitzman of Vulture gave the episode a 2 star rating out of 5 and wrote, "I fear we may be losing the plot a bit on Dexter: Original Sin — or maybe I should just speak for myself. It's not that I'm having trouble following what's going on, but that I'm genuinely not sure where to devote my attention. Four episodes into the first season, there are obviously two main storylines: Dexter becoming a serial killer in the present, and Harry's relationship with his doomed CI Laura Moser in the past. There's so much else happening on the fringes, though, that the show is feeling increasingly scattered."

Callum Murray of Game Rant wrote, "The main overarching storyline featuring the murder of a prominent judge's son is really coming into focus at a nice pace, and the mystery villain is a good twist on the usual format. The killer could literally be anyone, and that adds to the tension in Original Sin. The stand-out episode so far."

Greg MacArthur of Screen Rant gave the episode a 7 out of 10 rating and wrote, "As much as Original Sin is obviously a Dexter origin story, it is also the first franchise deep dive into Harry Morgan's backstory as a Miami Metro homicide detective and the struggling father of a serial killer in disguise. All things considered, Harry seems to be keeping himself together just fine four episodes in but certain realities of Dexter's "urges" are clearly bothering him beneath the surface. Slater's expert portrayal of Harry as an earnest man who is quietly bursting at the seams makes him just as riveting to watch as Dexter." Mads Misasi of Telltale TV gave the episode a 4 star rating out of 5 and wrote, "As we dig deeper into Harry's past with Laura Moser, Dexter's career as a serial killer of justice is ramping up. Dexter: Original Sin Season 1 Episode 4, “Fender Bender,” does a great job of giving us glimpses of the many complexities that Dexter Morgan has."
