= Blood Drive (Dexter: Original Sin) =

- Dexter: Original Sin episode
- Aaron Spencer (Patrick Dempsey) at Dexter Morgan's (Patrick Gibson) kill table after Dexter discovered that he killed Jimmy Powell and kidnapped his own son (London Thatcher).
- Episode no.: Episode 9
- Directed by: Michael Lehmann
- Story by: Scott Reynolds; Alex Kellerman
- Teleplay by: Scott Reynolds
- Cinematography by: Edward J. Pei
- Editing by: Louis Cioffi
- Original air date: February 7, 2025
- Running time: 51 minutes

Guest appearances
- Sarah Michelle Gellar as Tanya Martin (special guest star); Brittany Allen as Laura Moser; Roby Attal as Brian Moser; Kathleen Rose Perkins as Barbara; Eli Sherman as Little Dexter; London Thatcher as Nicky Spencer; Jasper Lewis as Doris Morgan; Amanda Brooks as Becca Spencer; Sarah Kinsey as Camilla Figg; Aaron Jennings as Clark Sanders

Episode chronology
← Previous "Business and Pleasure"	Next → "Code Blues"

"Blood Drive" is the ninth episode of the American crime drama mystery television series Dexter: Original Sin, prequel to Dexter. The episode was written by executive producer Scott Reynolds from a story by Reynolds and Alex Kellerman, and directed by executive producer Michael Lehmann. It was released on Paramount+ with Showtime on February 7, 2025, and airing on Showtime two days later.

The series explores a young Dexter Morgan, as he begins working as a forensic blood spatter analyst at the Miami Metro Police Department. It also explores his inner conflicts, wherein he begins his days as serial killer. In the episode, Dexter pursues Spencer, while Harry finds a shocking discovery about the investigation. Flashbacks depict the aftermath of Laura's murder, and Harry's decision over Brian's future.

The episode received positive reviews from critics, who praised the tension, flashbacks and ending.

== Plot ==
At a retirement home, the residents are playing bingo. A woman, Barbara (Kathleen Rose Perkins), is joined by a young man (Roby Attal), who helps her with her card and bonds with her. As she introduces herself, he reveals his name is Brian. When Brian wins the game, he invites her to dine with him. He reveals his full name as Brian Moser and sedates her, taking her in his van.

At the hospital, Harry (Christian Slater) is informed of Bobby's condition. LaGuerta (Christina Milian) confronts Harry for stealing the file from Tampa's police, and he finally comes clean about Brian's status, but asks her not to interfere. Nevertheless, LaGuerta visits Camilla (Sarah Kinsey) to check Estrada's file, which she complies, informing Harry that she omitted Dexter's name from all files.

Dexter (Patrick Gibson) continuing his plan to kill Spencer (Patrick Dempsey), breaks into his apartment to sedate him, but is forced to leave when Spencer arrives accompanied with Harry. The following day, Dexter's investigation into Nicky's status is interrupted when Tanya (Sarah Michelle Gellar) assigns him to oversee a blood drive for Bobby. Spencer is one of the volunteers, and he and Dexter have a tense conversation over Nicky's disappearance. Clark (Aaron Jennings) also wants to donate, but confides in Dexter that he had contact with a man who tested for HIV and is awaiting results to know if he is positive as well, so Dexter agrees to donate blood in Clark's name. Unaware of this, Masuka (Alex Shimizu) pressures Dexter to donate more blood in his name. Returning home from donating blood, Debra (Molly Brown) receives a voice mail from Florida State University; despite her school incident, the volleyball team is still interested in her.

In flashbacks, Harry convinces Spencer to lead a search party for Laura (Brittany Allen) and the kids, but is demoted after revealing his affair. After some time searching the shipyard, the police finally find Dexter and Brian, along with Laura's dismembered body and those of the other victims. As child protective services do not want to separate the brothers and noting that their father is in prison and has renounced his parental rights, Harry and Doris (Jasper Lewis) agree to act as foster parents for Dexter and Brian. However, Brian almost smothers a young Debra when she does not stop crying, and attacks Harry when he scolds him before breaking a window. Realizing Brian is a danger to Debra, Harry and Doris reluctantly decide to send Brian away with a social worker, Barbara, but keep Dexter as they have grown attached to him.

While investigating the murders, Harry is shocked to realize that Brian was present at each of the crime scenes. He visits an unconscious Bobby (Reno Wilson) at the hospital, confiding in him that Brian returned and his concerns regarding Dexter knowing about it. Bobby briefly regains consciousness, telling Harry to "Save Dexter". That night, Spencer returns home and finds a note containing a demand for money followed by a threat that he will be exposed if he does not deliver the money. Spencer arrives at the meeting location, an arcade Nicky frequented, and Dexter attacks him. Despite this leading to a struggle, Dexter ultimately manages to sedate Spencer. After awakening on Dexter's kill table, Spencer admits to using Nicky to get back at his ex-wife for cheating on him, as she turned their son against him. Dexter begins torturing Spencer, severing one of his fingers, in order to force him to reveal Nicky's location, before leaving him alone to consider his decision. However, Dexter, seemingly by accident, rips part of the wrap, allowing Spencer to release himself. Spencer flees in his car, unaware that Dexter is following, having set it up to find Nicky's location. At an undisclosed location, Brian ties Barbara to a pole, scolding her for separating him from Dexter, then uses a chainsaw and begins dismembering her alive.

== Production ==
=== Development ===
The episode was written by executive producer Scott Reynolds from a story by Reynolds and Alex Kellerman, and directed by executive producer Michael Lehmann. This was Reynolds' first writing credit, Kellerman's first writing credit, and Lehmann's fifth directing credit.

== Reception ==
"Blood Drive" received positive reviews from critics. Louis Peitzman of Vulture gave the episode a 3 star rating out of 5 and wrote, "The penultimate hour of this series' first season probably could have been the finale, but instead the show is treading water, a frustrating move after last week's propulsive episode. On the other hand, an explosive finale could paper over a lot of Original Sin's, well, sins."

Callum Murray of Game Rant wrote, "These scenes shed more light on the events in the 90s timeline, and they generally work really well. It still feels very fan service heavy to introduce Brian Moser into the story, with legacy fans very aware of what eventually happens to him. However, Roby Attal nails the character, and it's fun to see his origin story."

Greg MacArthur of Screen Rant wrote, "After Spenser admits to kidnapping Nicky but not to being a serial killer, Dexter is taken aback by the apparent lesson that one major life event can turn a good person into a killer. Still, a lot of explanation is needed to call Spencer a good-to-great Dexter villain after Original Sin episode 9, and these details will have to be sorted out in the season 1 finale." Mads Misasi of Telltale TV gave the episode a 4.5 star rating out of 5 and wrote, "For a season that's already been packed with well-timed reveals and intense sequences, the penultimate episode, Dexter: Original Sin Season 1 Episode 9, “Blood Drive,” still manages to pack a punch."
