= The Joy of Killing =

- Dexter: Original Sin episode
- Dexter Morgan (Patrick Gibson) about to kill Levi Reed (Jeff Daniel Phillips), being his third murder, becoming a serial killer.
- Episode no.: Episode 6
- Directed by: Michael Lehmann
- Written by: Terry Huang
- Cinematography by: Edward J. Pei
- Editing by: Louis Cioffi; Christian Miglio
- Original air date: January 10, 2025
- Running time: 49 minutes

Guest appearances
- Sarah Michelle Gellar as Tanya Martin (special guest star); Brittany Allen as Laura Moser; Assistant Chief Carl Borlee; Raquel Justice as Sofia Rivera; Jeff Daniel Phillips as Levi Reed; Sarah Kinsey as Camilla Figg; Aaron Jennings as Clark Sanders; Isaac Gonzalez Rossi as Gio; Jasper Lewis as Doris Morgan; Amanda Brooks as Becca Spencer; London Thatcher as Nicky Spencer; Randy Gonzalez as Santos Jimenez

Episode chronology
← Previous "F Is for Fuck Up"	Next → "The Big Bad Body Problem"

"The Joy of Killing" is the sixth episode of the American crime drama mystery television series Dexter: Original Sin, prequel to Dexter. The episode was written by Terry Huang, and directed by executive producer Michael Lehmann. It was released on Paramount+ with Showtime on January 10, 2025, and airing on Showtime two days later.

The series explores a young Dexter Morgan, as he begins working as a forensic blood spatter analyst at the Miami Metro Police Department. It also explores his inner conflicts, wherein he begins his days as serial killer. In the episode, Dexter targets Levi Reed, while Spencer faces a family tragedy when his son is kidnapped.

The episode received mixed-to-positive reviews from critics, who praised the ending, but criticized the subplots and aimless nature of the episode.

== Plot ==
Spencer's ex-wife Becca (Amanda Brooks) is preparing to leave her house with their son, Nicky (London Thatcher). Suddenly, a masked man knocks her unconscious and ties her up in the garage, before taking a screaming Nicky as a hostage. Becca later arrives at the station to report the incident, devastating Spencer (Patrick Dempsey).

For his actions, Harry (Christian Slater) is assigned to work with LaGuerta (Christina Milian) on a murder case. At the scene, Dexter (Patrick Gibson) suggests that the murder is related to other previous murders, despite the fact that the victims were all killed in different ways. He concludes that the killer is trying to find his preferred method, but LaGuerta dismisses the theory. Dexter begins pursuing Levi Reed (Jeff Daniel Phillips) and ponders over the idea that, as this would be his third victim, he would now be considered a serial killer. He accompanies Debra (Molly Brown) on a double date with Sofia (Raquel Justice) and Gio (Isaac Gonzalez Rossi), using the opportunity to stalk Reed. During this, Sofia surprises Dexter by performing oral sex on him in the bathroom.

In flashbacks, Harry tells Laura (Brittany Allen) that she needs to arrange a meeting with Hector Estrada, which should finally close the case and release her from her job. Laura goes to the shipyard to meet Estrada, but is disturbed upon seeing Santos Jimenez (Randy Gonzalez) cut off a man's finger for stealing some of their money, and she is warned to stay loyal. Laura wants to leave the assignment, but Harry asks her to stay. He leaves her in the motel when he gets word that Doris (Jasper Lewis) has given birth to their child, Debra. Doris reveals she knows about the affair, and asks Harry to end it for the sake of their family.

After the double date, Dexter follows Reed to a nightclub only to run into Officer Clark Sanders (Aaron Jennings), a Miami Metro colleague. Dexter quickly leaves and subdues Reed in an alley. He takes him to his killing table, contemplating the fact that he is about to become a serial killer. Reed proudly admits his crimes, explaining that he enjoyed seeing his victims suffer. He also explains that despite what Dexter tells himself, they are not so different. Dexter maintains he does not kill innocent people before killing Reed. Spencer assembles a team to help find Nicky, although many question if his presence could ruin the investigation. As Harry comforts Spencer, Dexter drives to the swamp to dispose of Reed's body. However, he is stopped by the police, as they are currently investigating a crime scene; the severed arm of one of Dexter's victims has been found.

== Production ==
=== Development ===
The episode was written by Terry Huang, and directed by executive producer Michael Lehmann. This was Huang's first writing credit, and Lehmann's fourth directing credit.

=== Writing ===
When Dexter stalks Levi Reed in the street, an ice truck almost hits Dexter. Showrunner Clyde Phillips confirmed that the truck belonged to the character of Brian Moser, "We just threw that away! We didn’t do a close up or anything. It looks like it’s the same ice truck, too."

== Reception ==
"The Joy of Killing" received mixed-to-positive reviews from critics. Louis Peitzman of Vulture gave the episode a 2 star rating out of 5 and wrote, "There are four episodes left this season, and also this is a prequel. It certainly complicates his situation, though — and it complicates a series that’s already too busy. Part of the problem with Original Sin is that there may not be much story to tell when it comes to Dexter's origin; as much as he talks about his serial killer evolution in this episode, he sort of emerged fully formed in the premiere. As a result, the writers have thrown a lot of other storylines at us, and it's making the whole show feel frustratingly unfocused."

Callum Murray of Game Rant wrote, "Another dark and twisted episode that blends well with a few flickers of laugh-out humor, and it successfully re-introduces the main storyline with potentially devastating consequences."

Greg MacArthur of Screen Rant gave the episode an 8 out of 10 rating and wrote, "Even though there are multiple moving parts by the end of episode 6, Original Sin avoids overwhelming itself, and us, with leads it won't be able to pay off by season 1's finale. This creates an impressive sense of suspense even though a lot is already known about Dexter's backstory." Mads Misasi of Telltale TV gave the episode a 4.5 star rating out of 5 and wrote, "I love that Dexter: Original Sin isn't shying away from showing Dexter fumble a bit before he becomes adept at being a human. After all, he has to grow and learn in order to become the Dexter Morgan we all know and love."
