= F Is for Fuck Up =

- Dexter: Original Sin episode
- Episode no.: Episode 5
- Directed by: Michael Lehmann
- Written by: Alexandra Franklin; Marc Muszynski
- Cinematography by: Edward J. Pei
- Editing by: Katie Ennis
- Original air date: January 3, 2025
- Running time: 51 minutes

Guest appearances
- Sarah Michelle Gellar as Tanya Martin (special guest star); Brittany Allen as Laura Moser; Jasper Lewis as Doris Morgan; Jeff Daniel Phillips as Levi Reed; Aaron Jennings as Clark Sanders; Sarah Kinsey as Camilla Figg; Eli Sherman as Young Dexter; Isaac Gonzalez Rossi as Gio; Alyssa Limperis as Carol Shears

Episode chronology
← Previous "Fender Bender"	Next → "The Joy of Killing"

"F Is for Fuck Up" is the fifth episode of the American crime drama mystery television series Dexter: Original Sin, prequel to Dexter. The episode was written by producers Alexandra Franklin and Marc Muszynski, and directed by executive producer Michael Lehmann. It was released on Paramount+ with Showtime on January 3, 2025, and airing on Showtime two days later.

The series explores a young Dexter Morgan, as he begins working as a forensic blood spatter analyst at the Miami Metro Police Department. It also explores his inner conflicts, wherein he begins his days as serial killer. In the episode, Dexter is grounded after his misstep in Mad Dog's case, while Harry realizes he made a mistake during Levi Reed's trial.

The episode received generally positive reviews from critics, who praised the scenes between Dexter and Harry, although some criticized the lack of momentum from the previous episode and flashbacks.

== Plot ==
After a man accidentally hits Mad Dog, Dexter (Patrick Gibson) quickly returns to Mad Dog's house to take down the kill room and dispose of any evidence he was there before the police arrives. Just as Dexter finishes removing the evidence, two police officers arrive. Dexter narrowly avoids being seen by them before they leave.

Dexter returns home, where he is reprimanded by Harry (Christian Slater) for his misstep, as Mad Dog's death has been reported over police radio. Believing he rushed his urges, Harry decides to get him "back to basics", prohibiting him from pursuing other people and grounding him in the house. Bored, Dexter еаts some brownies from the fridge, unaware that the brownies were for Debra's volleyball team and contain cannabis, causing Dexter to become intoxicated. Debra (Molly Brown) is shocked when she discovers this, but finds the situation hilarious, and decides to also eat a brownie to "catch up" with him. As they hang out, they talk over Doris' death anniversary the following day and what she meant for both of them.

The following day, Dexter enters the interrogation room where LaGuerta (Christina Milian) interrogates the driver who hit Mad Dog to collect his DNA. Inspired by LaGuerta's comfort, Dexter finds that he needs to earn his colleagues' trust in order to improve himself. He interacts with Tanya (Sarah Michelle Gellar), who suggests using etorphine to knock a "big horse" unconscious. Dexter sneaks into a horse track to steal etorphine, but is forced to hide in a stable with a horse when the managers return earlier than expected. During the trial of Levi Reed (Jeff Daniel Phillips), Harry is questioned for not letting a drug addicted woman offer an alibi for Reed, with his lawyer passing it as suppression of evidence. Despite Harry's protests, the Judge dismisses the case, allowing Reed to be released. Spencer (Patrick Dempsey) is furious with Harry, and questions his future at Miami Metro. With both Dexter and Harry busy, Debra is forced to visit her mother's grave alone, and seeks comfort with Gio (Isaac Gonzalez Rossi). In flashbacks, Harry and Laura (Brittany Allen) continue their affair, despite Harry's insistence that they should stop. Arriving home, Harry is surprised when Doris reveals that she is pregnant again.

At a bar, Spencer tells a drunk Harry that he convinced the Mayor to allow Harry to stay at Miami Metro. Nevertheless, he has been removed from Jimmy Powell's case, and will now work with LaGuerta in Homicide. Still upset that he allowed a criminal to walk free, Harry drives to Reed's house and aims his pistol at Reed, intending to kill him himself. Before he can pull the trigger, however, he is knocked unconscious by Dexter, who takes him back home, strips him naked and fastens him to a kill table he had set up there. He shows he learned from his mistakes and scolds him for almost ruining his life for going after Reed. After releasing him, Dexter reiterates that he is the only one who can go after Reed. Harry gives Dexter his blessing, telling him to use smelling salts to wake him up earlier. The following day, Dexter visits Doris' gravestone, finally coming to understand her decision to send him to a psychiatrist, believing she saw goodness in him.

== Production ==
The episode was written by producers Alexandra Franklin and Marc Muszynski, and directed by executive producer Michael Lehmann. This was Franklin's first writing credit, Muszynski's first writing credit, and Lehmann's third directing credit.

== Reception ==
"F Is for Fuck Up" received generally positive reviews from critics. Louis Peitzman of Vulture gave the episode a 3 star rating out of 5 and wrote, "Okay, I'm willing to concede that Dexter: Original Sin may have more of a plan than I gave it credit for last week. Those seemingly disparate storylines are starting to come together at the midpoint of the season, so things should wrap up in the next several weeks — or at least reach a satisfying enough conclusion until the inevitable second season. At the same time, the show is still struggling to hit the heights of the series premiere, with another episode that's so heavy on its theme of “accidents happen” that it almost collapses under the weight of its plot contrivances."

Callum Murray of Game Rant wrote, "The fifth entry in the first season is entertaining, but strangely deviates from the main Miami Metro investigation, which is quite jarring. There is so much story to contend with, including the 1970s flashbacks, and teenage Dexter's serial-killing antics in the 90s, but luckily, these aspects are enough to keep things interesting."

Greg MacArthur of Screen Rant gave the episode a 6 out of 10 rating and wrote, "There are certainly frustrating elements of episode 5, especially in the tension-less courtroom scene and the relentless licensed soundtrack inclusions. Hopefully, Dexter: Original Sin episode 6 will get back on track with its main villain arc and will prove that episode 5 was only taking a breath rather than blowing smoke." Mads Misasi of Telltale TV gave the episode a perfect 5 star rating out of 5 and wrote, "As one of the strongest episodes of the show to date, Dexter: Original Sin Season 1 Episode 5, “F is for Fuck Up,” dives into how both Dexter and Harry aren't as in control as they'd like to be. It gives viewers a stronger look into the dynamic between this unconventional father and son duo."
