= Jonathan Adams (American actor) =

American actor

- Born: July 16, 1967 (age 59); Pittsburgh, Pennsylvania, US
- Education: Carnegie Mellon University
- Occupation: Actor
- Years active: 1990–present
- Known for: Last Man Standing
- Spouse: Monica Farrell (m. 1994)
- Children: 2

Jonathan Adams (born July 16, 1967) is an American actor. He is best known for playing Henry Walker on American Dreams, Daniel Goodman on Bones and Chuck Larabee on Last Man Standing. He is also known as a voice actor with roles such as Galactus, Dormammu and Kang the Conqueror from Marvel Comics and Darkseid and Atrocitus from DC Comics.

== Early life ==
Adams was born on July 16, 1967, in Pittsburgh, Pennsylvania, and grew up in Wilkinsburg. He graduated from Wilkinsburg High School in 1985 and studied acting at Carnegie Mellon University for a year and a half before having to drop out because he could no longer afford tuition.

== Career ==
He has appeared in several roles on American television, including American Dreams on NBC, where he played series regular Henry Walker (2002–05). He portrayed Dr. Daniel Goodman in the first season of the Fox television series Bones. At the start of season 2, his character appointed Dr. Camille Saroyan (Tamara Taylor) to be the Jeffersonian's first head of forensics (the immediate boss of Temperance Brennan). Although he was supposed to have left on a short sabbatical, his character did not return. The show's creator, Hart Hanson, stated that Taylor's role was a better fit with the rest of the characters in the series. He later appeared in the short-lived ABC crime drama Women's Murder Club.

Between 1996 and 2000, Adams spent four years at the Oregon Shakespeare Festival playing, among other roles, Petruchio in The Taming of the Shrew, Buckingham in The Three Musketeers and Guy Jacobs in Blues for an Alabama Sky by Pearl Cleage. He was also a voice actor in Army of Two: The 40th Day as Tyson Rios.

== Filmography ==
=== Film ===
Year	Title	Role	Notes
1998	Air Bud: Golden Receiver	New York Giants Player	
2001	Osmosis Jones	Tom the police officer of Frank Police Department	Voice
2007	Doctor Strange: Sorcerer Supreme	Dormammu	Voice, direct-to-video
2009	Superman/Batman: Public Enemies	General	Voice, direct-to-video
2010	Justice League: Crisis on Two Earths	Martian Manhunter	Voice, direct-to-video
2012	Pixar Short Films Collection, Volume 2	Judge Davis	Voice, direct-to-video
2013	Planes	Additional voices	
2018	Lego DC Comics Super Heroes: Aquaman – Rage of Atlantis	Atrocitus	Voice, direct-to-video
2018	The Death of Superman	Mayor Booker	Voice, direct-to-video
2023	Elemental	Flarry	Voice
2024	Justice League: Crisis on Infinite Earths	The Monitor	Voice, direct-to-video

=== Television ===
Year	Title	Role	Notes
1990	Equal Justice	Keane	Episode: "Pilot"
2001	Frasier	Fire Marshall	Episode: "The Show Must Go Off"
2001	Walker, Texas Ranger	Lyle Nugent	Episode: "Justice for All"
2001	Felicity	Paramedic	Episode: "Girlfight"
2002	The American Embassy	Elque "Q" Polk	6 episodes
2002–2005	American Dreams	Henry Walker	61 episodes
2004	Crossing Jordan	Juror	Episode: "Slam Dunk"
2005	Bones	Daniel Goodman	22 episodes
2006	The Unit	Buko	Episode: "Old Home Week"
2007	One Tree Hill	Charles Taylor	Episode: "The Birth and Death of the Day"
2007	The Closer	Randall Williams	Episode: "Ruby"
2007	NCIS	Thomas Zuri	Episode: "Designated Target"
2007	Cane	Fosko	Episode: "The Exile"
2007–2008	Women's Murder Club	Ed Washburn	5 episodes
2007, 2009	24	Peter Hock	2 episodes
2008	Medium	Curtis Lambert	Episode: "Being Joey Carmichael"
2008	Boston Legal	Officer Preston Holt	Episode: "Kill, Baby, Kill!"
2009	Numbers	Clifford Hansen	Episode: "Greatest Hits"
2009	The Cleaner	Harold Miller	Episode: "An Ordinary Man"
2009	NCIS: Los Angeles	Peter Caldwell	Episode: "Search and Destroy"
2010	The Deep End	Robert Craft	Episode: "Pilot"
2010	Black Panther	T'Chaka, M'Butu's Security Officer, Citizen #1	Voice, 2 episodes
2010	Desperate Housewives	Luke Rayfield	Episode: "Chromolume No. 7"
2010	Miami Medical	Colin	Episode: "Down to the Bone"
2010	No Ordinary Family	Coach Baskin	Episode: "No Ordinary Vigilante"
2010–2011	Hellcats	Lewis's Dad	2 episodes
2010–2012	The Avengers: Earth's Mightiest Heroes	Kang the Conqueror	Voice, 5 episodes
2011	Memphis Beat	Detective Moran	Episode: "Troubled Water"
2011	The Glades	Dan Ranson	Episode: "Breakout"
2011	Fanboy & Chum Chum	Mr. Trick, Narrator	Voice, episode: "There Will Be Shrieks"
2011	Cars Toons	Judge Davis	Voice, episode: "Air Mater"
2011	Burn Notice	Joseph Kamba	Episode: "Necessary Evil"
2011	Harry's Law	Physician	Episode: "Head Games"
2011	Prophets of Science Fiction	Narrator	6 episodes
2011–2013	Green Lantern: The Animated Series	Atrocitus	Voice, 6 episodes
2011–2014	Castle	Vulcan Simmons	3 episodes
2012	Up All Night	Ray	Episode: "Couple Friends"
2012–2013	Revenge	Matt Duncan	3 episodes
2012–2021	Last Man Standing	Chuck Larabee	112 episodes
2013	Pair of Kings	Mr. Dawson / Paka Tui	Episode: "Meet the Parent"
2013	Nikita	President of Chad	Episode: "Inevitability"
2013	Uncle Grandpa	Additional voices	3 episodes
2013–2014	The Legend of Korra	Vaatu, Varrick's Security Guard	Voice, 9 episodes
2013–2015	Hulk and the Agents of S.M.A.S.H.	Absorbing Man, Korg, Thunderball, Piledriver	Voice, 4 episodes
2014	Drop Dead Diva	Zack Reilly	Episode: "Hero"
2014	Dallas	Calvin Hannah	2 episodes
2015	Once Upon a Time	Merlin	Episode: "Lily"
2015	Avengers Assemble	Absorbing Man	Voice, 2 episodes
2015	Sofia the First	Mantacorn	Voice, episode: "Cool Hand Fluke"
2015	Ultimate Spider-Man	Absorbing Man	Voice, 2 episodes
2015	The Stinky & Dirty Show	Big Ben	Voice, 5 episodes
2015–2019	Guardians of the Galaxy	Ronan the Accuser, additional voices	Voice, 9 episodes
2016	Transformers: Robots in Disguise	Razorpaw	Voice, episode: "Cover Me"
2016	Sheriff Callie's Wild West	Buck	Voice, episode: "How the Water Was Won/Double Trouble"
2016	Masters of Sex	Judge O. Varga	Episode: "Outliers"
2017	Justice League Action	Darkseid	Voice, 4 episodes
2017	Man with a Plan	Pastor Carl	Episode: "Andi's Boyfriend"
2017, 2022	The Orville	Moclan Arbitrator	2 episodes
2018	Designated Survivor	Taurasi Governor	Episode: "Run"
2018	Detroiters	Royal's Steakhouse Bartender	Episode: "Royals"
2020	Teen Titans Go!	Ultralak	Voice, 2 episodes
2022	Dark Winds	Lester	5 episodes
2022	All Rise	Chief Sam Milton	Episode: "Through the Fire"
2022	Bob Hearts Abishola	Pastor Falade	2 episodes
2023	Grey's Anatomy	Dewayne Griffith	Episode: "Wedding Bell Blues"
2025	Dexter: Original Sin	Assistant Chief Carl Borlee	Episode: "The Joy of Killing"

=== Video games ===
Year	Title	Role	Notes
2010	Army of Two: The 40th Day	Tyson Rios	
2011	Marvel vs. Capcom 3: Fate of Two Worlds	Galactus	Also Ultimate
2011	Kinect Disneyland Adventures	Pirate	
2012	Diablo III	Tyrael	
2012	World of Warcraft: Mists of Pandaria	Xuen the White Tiger, Tsulong	
2012	Hitman: Absolution	Cosmo Faulkner	
2014	Hearthstone	Xuen the White Tiger	
2014	The Elder Scrolls Online	Additional voices	Also Morrowind DLC
2014–2015	Skylanders series	Additional voices	
2015	Heroes of the Storm	Tyrael	
2015	StarCraft II: Legacy of the Void	Additional voices	
2016	World of Warcraft: Legion	Xuen the White Tiger	
2017	For Honor	Okuma	
2026	Avatar Legends: The Fighting Game	Vaatu	
