= Shorecrest Preparatory School =

Prep school in St. Petersburg, Florida, US

Coordinates: 27°49′10″N 82°38′03″W

Location
- 5101 1st St NE; St. Petersburg, Florida; United States

Information
- Type: Private
- Established: 1923
- Head of school: Nancy Spencer
- Age range: 3-18
- Enrollment: 1015
- Campus: Suburban
- Campus size: 28 Acres
- Mascot: Sparky The Lightning Bolt
- Website: www.shorecrest.org

Shorecrest Preparatory School is a private, non-profit, non-sectarian, coeducational, college preparatory day school for students age 3 through Grade 12, located in St. Petersburg, Florida. Founded in 1923, it is one of the oldest independent day school in the state of Florida. A PK-12 institution, it serves St. Petersburg as well as the greater Tampa Bay area. The campus is on 28 acres located in St. Petersburg. Shorecrest is the home of the Chargers with 45 athletic teams of 24 sports, including recent additions of lacrosse and club flag football. 100% of Shorecrest seniors are accepted to college.

Shorecrest has been recognized by Apple as an Apple Distinguished School since 2016 for the integration of technology throughout the curriculum. Grades 2-12 have a 1:1 Device program. Shorecrest was ranked by Niche as #1 in Best Private High Schools in Pinellas County, Best College Prep Private High Schools in Pinellas County and Best Private High Schools in Pinellas County.

== Service ==
The mission of Shorecrest includes "the development of a commitment to social responsibility" and all grade levels at Shorecrest participate in service learning through various projects and community partnerships. The Upper School at Shorecrest is home to Service Week, a student-initiated program through which high school students invest a week in hands-on work with local, national and international service organizations.

== Athletics ==
Shorecrest offer students opportunities to compete in interscholastic athletics at Shorecrest beginning in sixth grade. Students have the opportunity to compete on Middle School, Junior Varsity, and Varsity teams across 24 different sports. Approximately 60% of the Upper School student body participate in the Chargers Athletics program.

Shorecrest Girls Varsity Volleyball won the 1A State Championship in 2018, and the Shorecrest Boys Varsity Soccer won the 2A State Championship in 2020, after earning runner-up position in the 2019 tournament. 2023 Girls Varsity Soccer were state runner-up. In 2021, 2022, and 2023 Shorecrest Chargers Varsity Football clenched the SSAC Florida State Championships.

The following sports are available to boys at Shorecrest:

| Fall | Winter | Spring |
|---|---|---|
| Bowling (V) | Basketball (MS, JV, V) | Tennis (JV, V) |
| Cross Country (V) | Cheerleading (Competitive) | Track and Field (MS, V) |
| Volleyball (MS, JV, V) | Soccer (MS, JV, V) | Baseball (MS, JV, V) |
| Football (MS, V) | | Softball (MS, V) |
| Golf (MS, V) | | |
| Sailing (V) | | |
| Swim and Dive (V) | | |

The following sports are available to girls at Shorecrest:

| Fall | Winter | Spring |
|---|---|---|
| Bowling (V) | Basketball (MS, JV, V) | Baseball (MS, JV, V) |
| Volleyball (MS, JV, V) | Cheerleading (Competitive) | Tennis (JV, V) |
| Cross Country (V) | Soccer (MS, V) | Softball (MS, V) |
| Football (MS, V) | | Track and Field (MS, V) |
| Golf (MS, V) | | |
| Sailing (V) | | |
| Swim and Dive (V) | | |

== Arts ==
The Upper School has over thirty visual and performing art courses. Shorecrest's Thespian Troupe 3140 and Jr. Thespian Troupe 88197 have garnered many top honors at both the District and State levels, including presenting one-acts and mainstage productions at the Florida State Thespian Festival in 2014 and 2015. Shorecrest in represented annually by nominees and winners of the Broadway Star of the Future Awards.

== Accreditation and memberships ==
Shorecrest Preparatory School is accredited or a member of the following organizations:

- Florida Council of Independent Schools (FCIS)
- National Association of Independent Schools (NAIS)
- Cognia

== Notable alumni ==
- Patrick Wilson '91; American stage, musical theatre, film and television actor
- Betsy Thomas Rook '76; author of My Grandmother was from Wales and Senator 1876-1965: The Life and Career of Elmer Thomas.
- Monica Raymund '04 won the 2013 Imagen Award for Best Actress in Television. Starred in "Lie To Me" and "Chicago Fire".
- The 2015-16 Shorecrest Alumni Distinguished Achievement Award went to Dr. Michael Ison '89, a physician working in transplants and infectious diseases at Northwestern University in Chicago.
- Dr. Laurie Butler '77; Laurie attended University of California, Berkeley, where she did her thesis research on electronic state-selective photochemistry and received her Ph.D. Laurie has been a professor in the Department of Chemistry and The James Franck Institute at the University of Chicago. In addition to her work as a professor and researcher, Laurie has co-authored over 100 research publications, including a number of chemistry textbooks, used in classrooms across the world.
