= Monica Raymund =

American actress (born 1986)

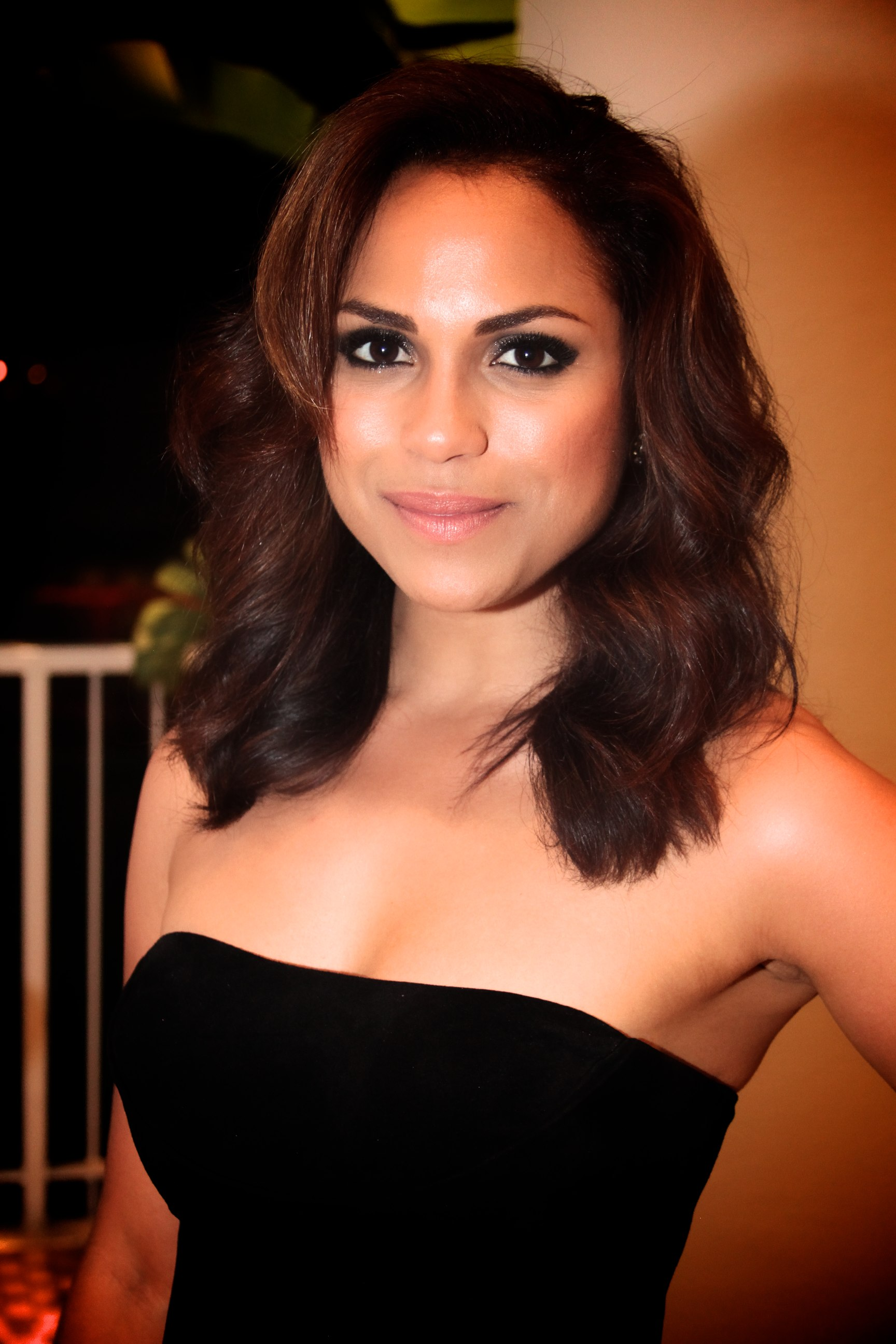
- Raymund at the 2013 Imagen Awards
- Born: July 26, 1986 (age 40); St. Petersburg, Florida, U.S.
- Education: Juilliard School (BFA)
- Occupations: Actress, director
- Years active: 2004–present
- Spouse: Neil Patrick Stewart (m. 2011; div. 2014)
- Family: Edward C. Raymund (paternal grandfather)

Monica Raymund (born July 26, 1986) is an American actress and director, known for her roles as Maria "Ria" Torres in the Fox crime drama Lie to Me (2009–2011), Dana Lodge in the CBS legal drama The Good Wife (2011–2012), Gabriela Dawson in the NBC drama Chicago Fire (2012–2019) and Jackie Quiñones in the Starz crime drama Hightown (2020–2024).

== Early life and education ==
Raymund was born in St. Petersburg, Florida, to Steve Raymund, the board chairman and retired CEO of Tech Data Corp., a Clearwater-based distributor of computer components and software, and Sonia (née Lara), a community volunteer and co-founder of the Soulful Arts Dance Academy in St. Petersburg. Her father is of English and Eastern European Jewish descent. Her mother is Dominican. Raymund was raised Jewish, celebrated a bat mitzvah, and attended a Reform Judaism temple. Her paternal grandfather was businessman and philanthropist Edward C. Raymund. Raymund's younger brother, Will, was a graduate of Berklee College of Music, and a sound and lighting engineer and music promoter. He died in August 2015.

In high school, she participated in the "Broadway Theater Project" in Tampa. In college, she was a founding member of The Performing Arts Project at the University of North Carolina School of the Arts in Winston-Salem."

Raymund graduated from Shorecrest Preparatory School in St. Petersburg, Florida, in 2004. She was later admitted to the Juilliard School in New York City, from which she graduated in 2008.

== Career ==
Reportedly, Raymund performed in Cymbeline directed by Richard Feldman, The Diviners (directed by Jonathan Bernstein), and Animal Farm (directed by Trazana Beverley), all at the Juilliard School.

Raymund appeared in her native St. Petersburg, Florida, in the LiveArts Peninsula Foundation's original production of Manhattan Casino (directed by Bob Devin Jones), where she originated the leading role of Althea Dunbar and Webb's City: The Musical (music & lyrics by Lee Ahlin, written and directed by William Leavengood)." Raymund "is a three-year alumna of Ann Reinking's Broadway Theater Project, where she has been a featured performer."

Raymund "worked with playwright José Rivera on Boleros for the Disenchanted at the Huntington Theatre Company in Boston" in 2008. In April 2008, she appeared in the NBC legal drama Law & Order: Special Victims Unit, in the season 9 episode 17 titled "Authority". She was in the opening scene as a strip search prank call victim.

From 2009 to 2011, she starred in the Fox crime drama Lie to Me, where she played Maria "Ria" Torres, a human lie detector. She is a "natural", meaning she has no formal training in detecting lies or the emotions of others.

From 2011 until 2012, Raymund had a recurring role in the third season of the CBS legal drama The Good Wife, where she played Dana Lodge, an assistant state's attorney.

In 2012, Raymund began starring in the NBC drama Chicago Fire. She played Gabriela Dawson, the paramedic in charge and a firefighter candidate. On May 15, 2018, Raymund confirmed that she was leaving the show after six seasons. She briefly appeared on the show in the seventh-season premiere "A Closer Eye". In November 2019, she returned to the show in the eighth-season episode "Best Friend Magic".

In 2020, Raymund began starring as Jackie Quiñones in the Starz crime drama Hightown, set in Provincetown, Massachusetts. The series ran for three seasons.

Raymund has also directed several episodes of television: an episode of Law & Order: Special Victims Unit, an episode of Dick Wolf's FBI, an episode of Chicago Fire, and four episodes each of Dexter: Original Sin and its 2025 sequel series Dexter: Resurrection.

== Personal life ==
On June 11, 2011, Raymund married writer Neil Patrick Stewart. They separated in early 2013 and divorced in 2014.

Raymund is an ardent supporter of LGBTQ rights. In February 2014, she came out publicly as bisexual for the first time via Twitter. On September 16, 2015, Raymund announced via Twitter that she had begun dating camerawoman, cinematographer, and producer Tari Segal.

== Filmography ==
=== Film ===
Year	Title	Role	Notes
2007	Fighter	Sarah	Short film
2008	Love? Pain	—N/a	Short film
2012	Arbitrage	Reina	
2012	Fifty Grades of Shay	Dialect Tape	Short film
2013	Brahmin Bulls	Maya	
2016	Happy Baby	María	
2022	Bros	Tina	
2023	The Caine Mutiny Court-Martial	Commander Katherine Challee	
2026	Tony	Mary	
2027	The Revenge of La Llorona †		Post-production

=== Television ===
Year	Title	Role	Notes
2008	Law & Order: Special Victims Unit	Trinidad "Trini" Martínez	Episode: "Authority"
2009–2011	Lie to Me	María "Ria" Torres	Main role; 48 episodes
2011	Blue Bloods	Luisa Sosa	Episode: "Critical Condition"
2011–2012	The Good Wife	Dana Lodge	Recurring role; 9 episodes
2012–2019	Chicago Fire	Gabriela Dawson	Main role (seasons 1–6), guest (seasons 7–8); 139 episodes Imagen Award for Best Actress in Television in 2013
2013	Body of Proof	FBI Video Analysis Agent	Episode: "Disappearing Act"
2014–2018	Chicago P.D.	Gabriela Dawson	Recurring role; 9 episodes
2016–2018	Chicago Med	Gabriela Dawson	Recurring role; 2 episodes
2017	Special Skills	Monica	Episode: "Party Animals"
2020–2024	Hightown	Jacqueline "Jackie" Quiñones	Main role; also producer and director
2025	On Call	Maria Delgado	Pilot Episode

=== Director ===
Year	Title	Notes
2018	Law & Order: Special Victims Unit	"Hell's Kitchen"
2020–2024	FBI	Season 2: "Payback", "Emotional Rescue"; Season 3: "Trigger Effect"; Season 6: "No One Left Behind"
2021	Law & Order: Organized Crime	"Unforgettable"
2021	The Sinner	"Part VIII"
2021	The Endgame	"Judge, Jury and Executioner"
2021–2024	Hightown	Season 2: "Fresh as a Daisy"; Season 3: "Fall Brook"
2022	National Treasure: Edge of History	"Graceland Gambit"
2024	Power Book II: Ghost	"The Reckoning"
2024	Dexter: Original Sin	"Miami Vice", "Fender Bender", "The Big Bad Body Problem", "Business and Pleasure"
2025	Dexter: Resurrection	Episodes 3–4, 7–8; also producer
2025	Power Book III: Raising Kanan	"The Price of Fame"
2025-2026	Boston Blue	Season 1: "Baggage Claim"; Season 2: "Blood Diamonds" "Bloodlines"
