= Dexter: Original Sin =

2024 American crime drama television series

- Genre: Crime drama; Mystery
- Created by: Clyde Phillips
- Based on: Dexter by James Manos Jr.; Dexter by Jeff Lindsay
- Showrunner: Clyde Phillips
- Starring: Patrick Gibson; Christian Slater; Molly Brown; Christina Milian; James Martinez; Alex Shimizu; Reno Wilson; Patrick Dempsey; Michael C. Hall
- Music by: Pat Irwin
- Country of origin: United States
- Original language: English
- No. of seasons: 1
- No. of episodes: 10

Production
- Executive producers: Tony Hernandez; Lilly Burns; John Goldwyn; Sara Colleton; Michael C. Hall; Mary Leah Sutton; Michael Lehmann; Scott Reynolds; Clyde Phillips
- Producers: Robert Lloyd Lewis; Nick Zayas; Alexandra Franklin; Marc Muszynski; Michael Amodio; Erik J. Carpenter
- Cinematography: Edward J. Pei; J. Michael Muro
- Editors: Perri Frank; Katie Ennis; Louis Cioffi; Christian Miglio; Sean Cusack; Liz Vendetti
- Running time: 46–58 minutes
- Production companies: Clyde Phillips Productions; Sal Centric; Counterpart Studios; Showtime Networks

Original release
- Network: Paramount+ with Showtime
- Release: December 13, 2024 – February 14, 2025

Related
- Dexter; Dexter: New Blood; Dexter: Resurrection

Dexter: Original Sin is an American crime drama mystery television series created by Clyde Phillips for Paramount+ with Showtime. A prequel to the television series Dexter (2006–2013), the series' frame story sees vigilante serial killer Dexter Morgan thinking back on his youth, starting in 1991, fifteen years before the first season of Dexter.

The series premiered on December 15, 2024, on Paramount+ with Showtime. Despite reports in April 2025 that the series had been renewed for a second season, it was ultimately canceled in August 2025.

== Cast and characters ==
=== Main ===
- Patrick Gibson as Dexter Morgan, a recently hired forensic intern at Miami Metro Police Department
- Christian Slater as Harry Morgan, Dexter's adoptive father and homicide detective at Miami Metro Police Department
- Molly Brown as Debra Morgan, Dexter's adoptive younger sister and Harry's daughter
- Christina Milian as María LaGuerta, the first female homicide detective at Miami Metro Police Department
- James Martinez as Angel Batista, a fellow detective working alongside Harry at Miami Metro Police Department
- Alex Shimizu as Vince Masuka, a forensic analyst at Miami Metro Police Department
- Reno Wilson as Bobby Watt, Harry's homicide division partner at Miami Metro Police Department
- Patrick Dempsey as Aaron Spencer, the captain of the homicide division at Miami Metro Police Department
- Michael C. Hall as the narrator/inner voice of Dexter. Hall also has a cameo appearance as adult Dexter.

=== Special guest star ===
- Sarah Michelle Gellar as Tanya Martin, the chief of forensics of the homicide division at Miami Metro Police Department and Dexter's boss

=== Recurring ===
- Brittany Allen as Laura Moser, Dexter's biological mother in flashbacks
- Raquel Justice as Sofia Rivera, Debra's best friend who develops a crush on Dexter
- Jeff Daniel Phillips as Levi Reed
- Sarah Kinsey as Camilla Figg, a records clerk at Miami Metro Police Department
- Jasper Lewis as Doris Morgan, Dexter's adoptive mother and Debra's biological mother in flashbacks
- Aaron Jennings as Clark Sanders, a closeted gay police officer at Miami Metro Police Department whom Dexter befriends
- Roberto Sanchez as Tony Ferrer
- Eli Sherman as young Dexter
- Carlo Mendez as Hector Estrada
- Randy Gonzalez as Santos Jimenez
- Isaac Gonzalez Rossi as Gio Martino
- Amanda Brooks as Becca Spencer, Aaron's ex-wife
- London Thatcher as Nicky Spencer, Aaron and Becca's son
- Roby Attal as Brian Moser, Laura Moser's older son and Dexter's biological brother
  - Xander Mateo co-stars as young Brian in flashbacks

=== Guest ===
- Joe Pantoliano as Mad Dog, a hitman
- Nick Santucci as young Miguel Prado
- Kathleen Rose Perkins as Barb, a social worker involved in placing Brian Moser

== Episodes ==
No.	Title	Directed by	Written by	Original release date
1	"And in the Beginning..."	Michael Lehmann	Clyde Phillips	December 13, 2024
After being shot by Harrison, (Note: As depicted in "Sins of the Father".) Dexter Morgan is revived as his life slips away. A young Dexter is interning as a surgeon and is about to graduate. At a fair, Dexter notices a booth featuring Vince Masuka, which piques his interest. Dexter attends a graduation party with his sister Debra. A young man gets Debra drunk and takes her to his room to take advantage of her; Dexter knocks him unconscious, and he and Debra are ejected from the party. Upon their return, their father Harry is awake, worried about them; years ago, Harry lost his son to a careless drowning. While hunting, Dexter tells Harry that killing animals is not enough and what happened at the party, causing him to have a heart attack and being hospitalized. Dexter discovers that the medication the nurse is giving him is killing him; Harry lets Dexter kill her. Dexter kills Mary, the nurse, his first victim; he uses a lake with alligators to make her disappear. Harry recovers and is released from the hospital, and Dexter graduates. Dexter tells Harry that killing Mary felt good, and Harry bursts into tears. Dexter starts working for the Miami Metro Police Department.
2	"Kid in a Candy Store"	Michael Lehmann	Katrina Mathewson & Tanner Bean	December 20, 2024
In the past, Harry and Bobby Watt are assigned to the Hector Estrada case. They arrested Joe and Laura Moser, who were trafficking cocaine. When Joe refuses, Harry makes Laura his informant for the case. After Harry Jr.'s death, Doris Morgan and Harry try to have another child. In the present, at an unknown location, a boy is kidnapped by a masked man and his finger is severed; the finger is received by Miami Metro. Dexter begins working for Masuka and is dispatched to a crime scene. Dexter tells his colleagues his hypothesis, but they laugh at him in a friendly way. Dexter feels like he has made friends for the first time during a meal. Debra gets angry at Harry for spending too much time with Dexter compared to her. Hoping to make Dexter more normal, Harry asks Angel Batista to take him out at night while Dexter searches the files for free killers so he can kill them. At night, Batista takes Dexter to a club, where he tells him about a loan shark who leaves nothing and kills those he lends. Thus, Dexter gets his next victim thanks to Batista, Tony Ferrer.
3	"Miami Vice"	Monica Raymund	Safura Fadavi	December 20, 2024
Years ago, Harry induces Laura to get closer to Estrada. After the success of the operation, Laura offers Harry sex, but he rejects it. In the present, Captain Aaron Spencer makes the disappearance of Jimmy Powell public, making the case a priority for the police department. María LaGuerta arrives as a newcomer to the homicide department to fill the gaps in the department's solves, much to Spencer's reluctance. Dexter begins to observe Ferrer and gathers evidence to kill him. Dexter, with Masuka's help, obtains a false identity to see Ferrer. Dexter discovers that Sofia Rivera, Debra's friend, has the earrings he kept as trophies. Dexter goes to a jai alai game to see Ferrer; Ferrer gives him a loan. Dexter cooks a cocaine-like recipe for Debra, and she helps him buy some earrings for Sofia and get the other ones back. Ferrer threatens Dexter if he doesn't give him the money within a day, and Dexter gathers evidence to kill him. Harry offers to be present when he does, but Dexter refuses. Dexter incapacitates Ferrer; despite his pleas, Dexter kills Ferrer and disposes of him in the swamp with the alligators.
4	"Fender Bender"	Monica Raymund	Nick Zayas	December 27, 2024
Years earlier, Harry babysits Laura's sons, Brian Moser and Dexter, to support the Estrada case; Harry begins to grow fond of Dexter. When Laura returns, she and Harry have sex. In the present, Jimmy is found hanging from a bridge, murdered. Dexter becomes anxious upon seeing Jimmy, so Harry sends him to another crime scene; Dexter begins to befriend police officer Clark Sanders. Debra develops a rivalry with a teammate after becoming captain. Dexter finds his new victim, Mad Dog, a mob hitman; Dexter finds potential evidence at Mad Dog's house. Harry and Debra's relationship remains strained. Dexter impresses some teammates after solving a crime, but not LaGuerta. Dexter gathers evidence from Mad Dog and shows it to Harry, and Harry lets him kill him. Debra begins seeing a man named Gio. Dexter goes on a boat trip with Mad Dog. Dexter, at Mad Dog's house, incapacitates him, but he wakes up and runs away; during the chase Mad Dog is hit by a car and dies.
5	"F Is for Fuck Up"	Michael Lehmann	Alexandra Franklin & Marc Muszynski	January 3, 2025
Years earlier, Harry and Laura were still having sex. One day, upon returning home, Doris reveals to Harry that she is pregnant. In the present, following the incident with Mad Dog, Dexter has little time to undo his plan to kill him; the police burst into the house, but cannot find Dexter. Upon returning, Harry berates Dexter for his recklessness with Mad Dog and forbids him from killing or going to work. Debra discovers that Dexter has been eating her marijuana brownies for the team. Debra eats a brownie, they spend the day together, and they reconnect. Dexter, thanks to Tanya, discovers etorphine, a sedative that would allow him to put his victims to sleep for as long as he needs. Harry's job is in danger when he botches a trial, and Levi Reed, a murderer, is released; Spencer retains him but takes him off Jimmy's case. Harry and Dexter leave Debra stranded, and she goes alone to her mother's grave. She spends the day with Gio, and they have sex. Harry attempts to kill Reed, but Dexter sedates him; Dexter uses him as a test for his new method. Dexter wants to kill Reed and suggests it to Harry, to which Harry agrees without hesitation.
6	"The Joy of Killing"	Michael Lehmann	Terry Huang	January 10, 2025
Years ago, Laura began to tire of the long time of the case. When Debra was born, Doris told Harry that she knew about his affair and couldn't do it anymore. In the present, Spencer's son, Nicky, is kidnapped by Jimmy's killer. Debra forces Dexter to meet Gio on a double date, accompanied by Sofia. At a crime scene, Dexter theorizes that certain murders are connected, with the killer looking for a method that will satisfy him; LaGuerta rejects the theory. Spencer is informed that his son has been kidnapped; the force worries that Spencer is on the case. Dexter begins to observe Reed. Dexter goes on the double date, demonstrating his social ineptitude; Sofia performs oral sex on Dexter. LaGuerta begins to believe Dexter's theory. Dexter sedates and kills Reed; Dexter becomes a serial killer. With Spencer tense, Harry comforts him. When Dexter goes to get rid of Reed, he encounters the police in the swamp, who have found Ferrer's hand.
7	"The Big Bad Body Problem"	Monica Raymund	Katrina Mathewson & Tanner Bean	January 24, 2025
Years ago, Harry forces Laura to continue the operation. Laura meets with Estrada and it appears to be a success; Estrada orders that she be kept under surveillance. In the present, Dexter enters the swamp crime scene, where LaGuerta and Masuka are present; Dexter gives Ferrer's hand to an alligator, claiming it attacked him. Dexter disposes of Reed in a dumpster. Sofia leaves Dexter, thinking he is setting her up; Sofia gets angry with Debra when she doesn't support her. LaGuerta tells Spencer about the serial killer theory, and Spencer allows them to investigate. Nicky attacks the captor but misses, and the captor cuts off his finger. Debra punches Tiffany and is kicked off the team; Debra leaves with Gio despite Harry's reluctance. Dexter begins looking for a place to dump his victims. The department receives the finger and confirms it is Nicky's; Dexter discovers possible killer blood. Dexter discovers a wound on Spencer and deduces that he's the killer. Spencer buys cereal, the ones the captor gives to Jimmy and Nicky.
8	"Business and Pleasure"	Monica Raymund	Story by : Mary Leah Sutton & Johanna Ramm; Teleplay by : Mary Leah Sutton	January 31, 2025
Years ago, Harry meets Laura publicly, which is witnessed by Jimenez. Later, Laura and her sons are kidnapped and taken to a shipping container with other captives, where Estrada and his men reveal they know she is a snitch and kill another captive in front of them. In the present, Dexter tells Harry his theory about Spencer, but Harry refuses to believe it and orders him to find Debra, who is missing. Dexter notices Spencer give a bag to a man who goes to a cartel house, and eventually discovers Gio has a fiance and has taken Debra to Bimini, where he picks her up after Gio abandons her. Taking her home, he realizes he can use the ocean to dispose of his victims. Harry and LaGuerta follow a lead to Tampa, where they find another victim, Dr. Petrie, a therapist. Harry finds one of his patients was Brian Moser, and hides this from LaGuerta. Spencer sets up a raid on the cartel house, and after finding Nicky's shirt, stages a breakdown and initiates a shootout with the cartel members, in which Bobby is critically shot. Realizing Spencer is the killer and orchestrated the events, Dexter decides to stop him.
9	"Blood Drive"	Michael Lehmann	Story by : Scott Reynolds & Alex Kellerman; Teleplay by : Scott Reynolds	February 7, 2025
Years ago, following the massacre, Harry finds Dexter and Brian in the shipping container. Due to their mother's death, he and Doris attempt to adopt them, but return Brian to social services after he nearly asphyxiates baby Debra. In the present, Brian kidnaps and kills his former social worker Barb. When confronted, Harry admits his connection to Brian to LaGuerta but conceals the fact that Dexter is also connected. Following the shootout, the police organize a blood drive for Bobby, which Debra and Dexter participate in, and Debra finds she is still considered for a volleyball scholarship. Harry discovers Brian was present at all the crime scenes, realizing he killed the victims to observe Dexter investigating. Dexter lures Spencer into a trap and captures him. Spencer admits he used Nicky to get back at his ex-wife for cheating on him and turning the boy against him. Dexter severs Spencer's finger and slightly loosens his restraints, allowing him to escape, and discreetly follows him to Nicky's location.
10	"Code Blues"	Michael Lehmann	Story by : Clyde Phillips & Alexandra Franklin & Marc Muszynski; Teleplay by : Clyde Phillips	February 14, 2025
For years, Brian went through several foster homes, each with problems, until he was finally admitted to a mental institution. During a therapy session, Dr. Petrie forbids him from seeing Dexter, so Brian kills him and leaves. Dexter follows Spencer to a ship where Nicky is being held. Dexter catches his attention, and Spencer tries to kill him, but fails. Spencer begins flooding Nicky's cell and gives Dexter the choice of saving Nicky or chasing him; Dexter saves Nicky, and Spencer flees. Harry goes with LaGuerta to the crime scene of Barb and spots Brian in the distance. Harry confronts Brian about the murders and his desire to be with Dexter and tries to stop him, but Brian claims he can only kill him; Harry can't, and Brian knocks him out. Spencer goes to Becca's house to kill her, knowing that Nicky is not his son, but Dexter knocks him out. On a boat, Dexter kills Spencer and throws him into the sea. Harry complains about being blinded by Spencer, but Dexter comforts him. Bobby leaves the hospital. While dining with Harry and Dexter in a Cuban restaurant, Debra announces she wants to join the police. The family celebrates together, with Brian looking on through a window.

== Production ==
=== Development ===
On February 6, 2023, Showtime gave production a series order for an origin-story prequel for Dexter, titled as Dexter: Origins created by Clyde Phillips. It was later retitled as Dexter: Original Sin and consisted of 10 episodes. Phillips, who serves as the showrunner, executive produced alongside Scott Reynolds, Michael C. Hall, Mary Leah Sutton, Tony Hernandez, and Lilly Burns, with Robert Lloyd Lewis serving as a producer. Production companies involved with the series are Showtime Studios and Counterpart Studios.

In March 2025, showrunner Clyde Phillips said of a second season "I honestly don't know. I'm busy shooting Resurrection now and haven't been thinking about the next season of Original Sin. We'll see." Cast members have said that they would be open to return for another season. "I had such a great time doing this and everybody involved is so incredible. To have Clyde [Phillips], the original showrunner, involved and still doing it, and the cast was also great that I would feel so, so lucky to come back again" Patrick Gibson said. On April 1, 2025, reports emerged that the series had been renewed for a second season. However, on August 22, 2025, Dexter: Original Sin was canceled prior to production on a second season commencing.

=== Casting ===
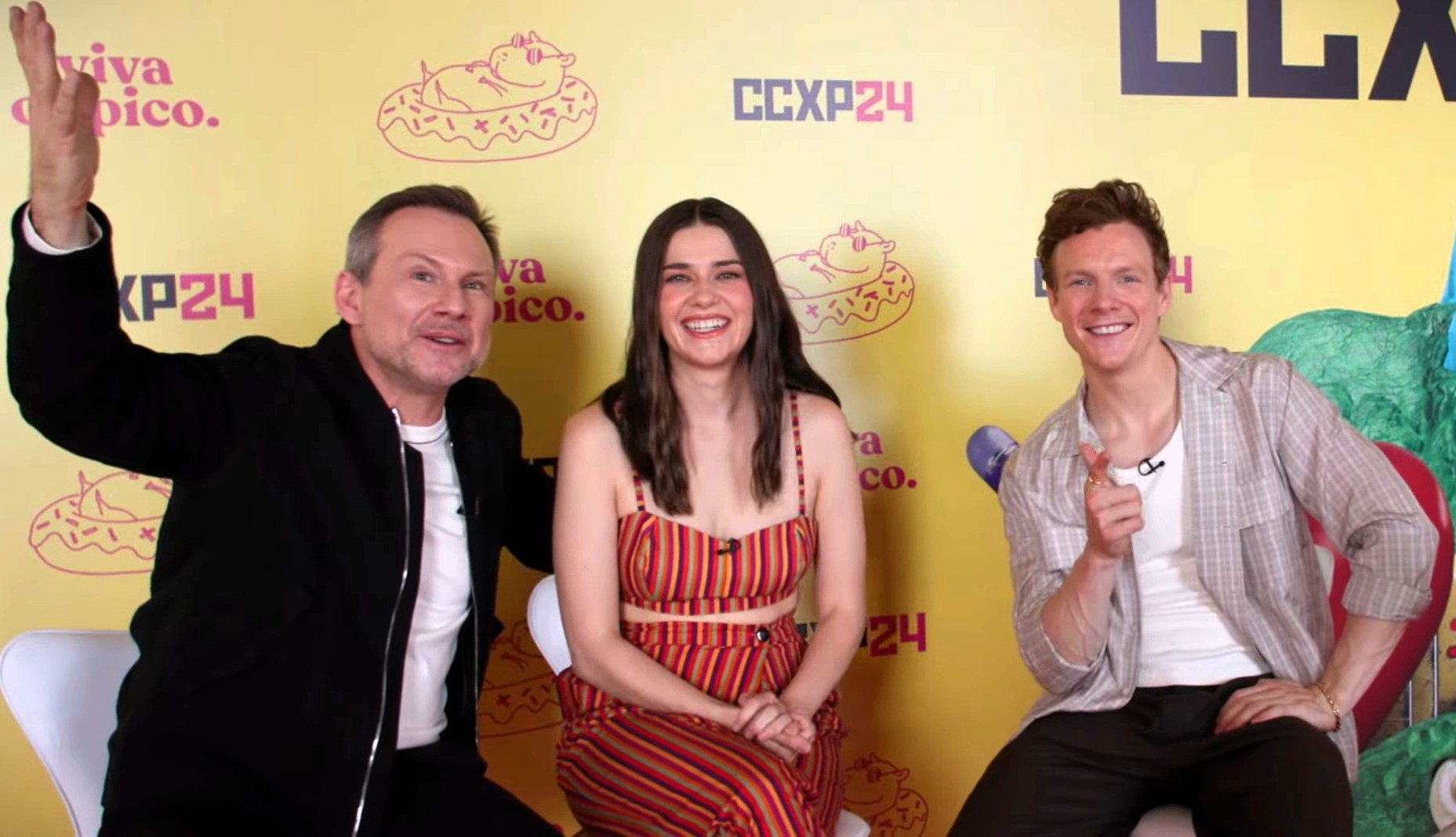
Christian Slater, Molly Brown and Patrick Gibson (left to right) discuss Dexter: Original Sin at CCXP in 2024

On May 23, 2024, Patrick Gibson, Christian Slater, and Molly Brown were cast in starring roles. In June 2024, James Martinez, Christina Milian, Alex Shimizu, Reno Wilson, and Patrick Dempsey joined the cast as series regulars while Sarah Michelle Gellar was cast as a special guest star. On July 11, 2024, Joe Pantoliano, Brittany Allen, Randy Gonzalez, Aaron Jennings, Raquel Justice, Jasper Lewis, Carlo Mendez, Isaac Gonzalez Rossi, and Roberto Sanchez were cast in recurring roles. On July 26, 2024, at San Diego Comic-Con during the Dexter: Original Sin panel, it was announced that Michael C. Hall is set to narrate the inner voice of a young Dexter Morgan. On August 14, 2024, Amanda Brooks joined the cast in a recurring capacity. On September 20, 2024, Eli Sherman, London Thatcher and Sarah Kinsey joined the cast in undisclosed capacities.

=== Filming ===
Principal photography for the series began on June 5, 2024, in Miami. In August 2024, it was reported that filming moved to Los Angeles.

== Release ==
Dexter: Original Sin premiered on December 13, 2024, on Paramount+ with Showtime.

== Reception ==
Upon its release Dexter: Original Sin became Showtime's most streamed premiere with over 2.1 million global cross-platform viewers.

Review aggregator website Rotten Tomatoes reported a 70% approval rating with an average rating of 6.6/10, based on 20 critic reviews. The website's critics consensus reads, "Original Sin cares less about injecting fresh blood than reviving a tried-and-true formula, making for a prequel that's just solid enough to scratch the Dexter itch with a scalpel." According to Metacritic, which calculated a weighted average of 50 out of 100 based on six critic reviews, the series premiere received a "mixed or average" response.
