= Alex Shimizu =

American film and television actor

- Born: New York City, U.S.
- Occupation: Actor
- Years active: 2013–present

Alex Shimizu is a Japanese American actor.

== Early life ==
Shimizu was born and raised in Manhattan, New York. He began his career as a dancer for the National Dance Institute while attending Hunter College Elementary School. He was mentored by founder Jacques d'Amboise and featured alongside him on the CBS Evening News and NPR with guest host Christopher Walken.

== Career ==
Shimizu performed Off Broadway and in the film version of Julie Taymor's A Midsummer Night's Dream. The film was shown at the 2014 Toronto International Film Festival as part of the Mavericks in Film Programme. He is known for portraying the recurring character Tadashi Ito on the NBC series The Blacklist starring James Spader and Toshiro Furuya on season 2 of AMC's horror anthology series The Terror, which focused on the Japanese American internment camps during World War II. In 2024, he was cast on Showtime's Dexter: Original Sin playing a young Vince Masuka, a forensic analyst who eagerly shares his expertise while relishing the chance to boss around his new intern, Dexter Morgan.

== Filmography ==
=== Film ===
Year	Title	Role
2014	A Midsummer's Night Dream	Rude Elemental
2017	The Outcasts	Howard

=== Television ===
Year	Title	Role	Notes
2014	Person of Interest	Daizo	2 episodes
2015	Community	Teen No. 2	1 episode
2015	Scorpion	Drama Student No. 1	1 episode
2016	Foursome	Lort	2 episodes
2016–17	Stuck in the Middle	Bai Hsu	2 episodes
2019	S.W.A.T	Kenta	1 episode
2019	The Terror	Toshiro Furuya	8 episodes
2018–23	The Blacklist	Tadashi Ito	7 episodes
2024	Interior Chinatown	Josh	1 episode
2024–25	Dexter: Original Sin	Vince Masuka	10 episodes
