= Raquel Justice =

American actress

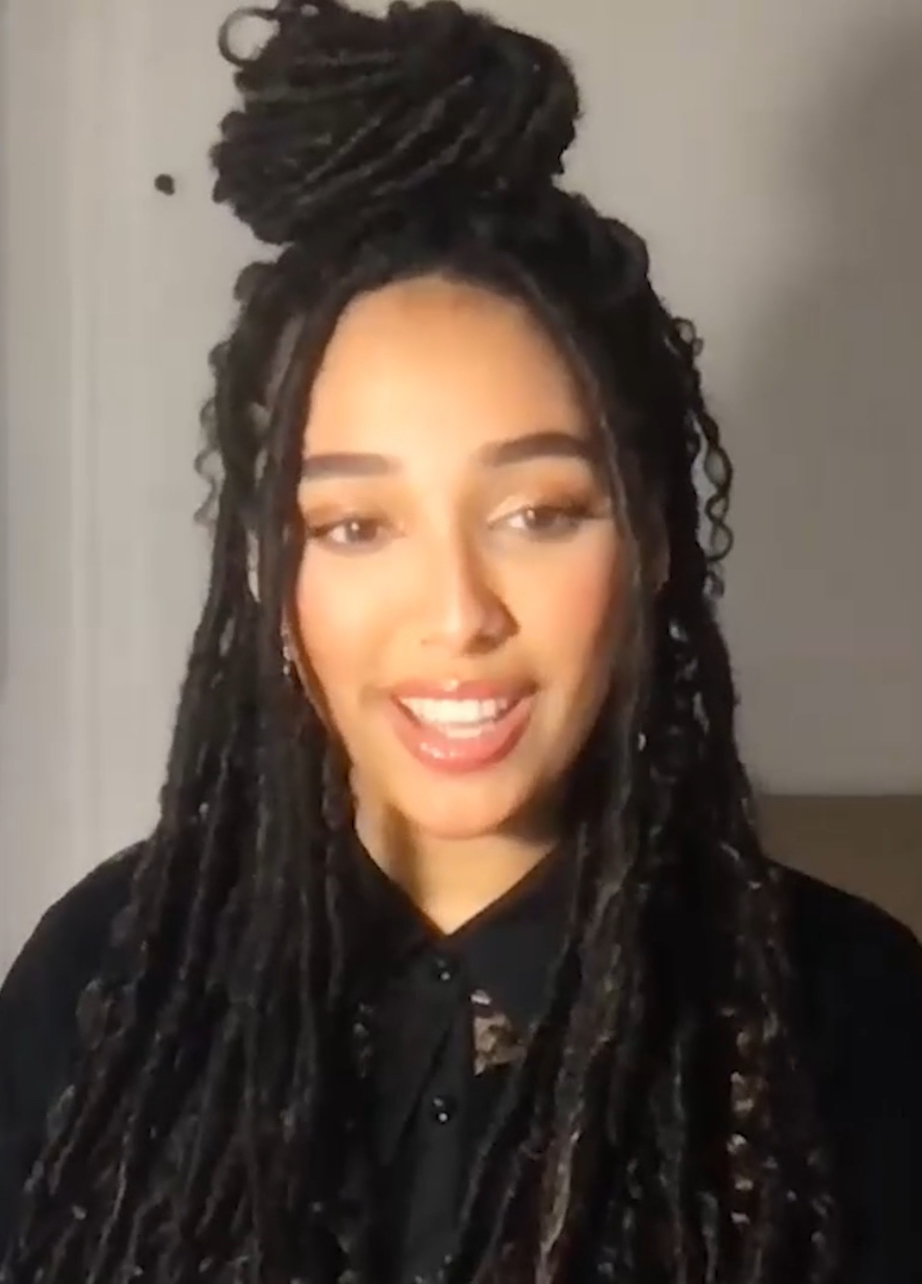
- Justice in 2025
- Born: June 15, 2004 (age 22); Poway, California, U.S.
- Education: Loyola Marymount University
- Occupation: Actress
- Years active: 2016–present
- Father: David Justice

Raquel Justice (born June 15, 2004) is an American actress. She began her career as a child actress in the Disney Channel series Andi Mack (2018–2019) and the Pop series One Day at a Time (2020). More recently, she is known for her role in the Paramount+ series Dexter: Original Sin (2024–2025).

== Early life ==
Raquel Justice was born on June 15, 2004, in Poway, California. She is the daughter of former Major League Baseball (MLB) player David Justice and fashion designer Rebecca Justice (nee Villalobos). Justice attended St Michael's School. She studied at Loyola Marymount University.

== Career ==
Justice first appeared on screen in the third season of Celebrity Wife Swap on ABC with her family in 2014, which she said "first introduced me to the acting world and business… I knew this is what I wanted to do." At age 11, Justice made her television acting debut portraying a young version of Jessica Sula's character Maddie in a 2016 episode of the Freeform teen drama Recovery Road. She was also a regular cast member of the YouTube series Kids React. This was followed by a guest appearance in an episode of the Nickelodeon series Nicky, Ricky, Dicky & Dawn.

In 2018 and 2019, Justice had her first recurring role as antagonist Kira in the third season of the Disney Channel comedy drama Andi Mack. She appeared in the Brat web series Sunnyside Up as Sienna. In 2020, she had a recurring role in the fourth season of the Pop sitcom One Day at a Time as Nora, the girlfriend of Alex Alvarez (Marcel Ruiz). Justice had further guest appearances in 2022 in the ABC sitcom Black-ish and the NBC sci-fi series Quantum Leap.

Justice played Sofia Rivera in the 2024 Paramount+ drama series Dexter: Original Sin. She also made her feature film debut as Destiny in the sports drama Finding Tony opposite Stephen Bishop.

== Personal life ==
In her spare time, Justice likes to paint, draw, photograph, dance, sing, and read. She is a fan of horror and psychological thrillers.

== Filmography ==
=== Film ===
Year	Title	Role	Notes
2018	My Two Left Feet	Raquel	Short
2024	Finding Tony	Destiny	

=== Television ===
Year	Title	Role	Notes
2016	Recovery Road	Young Maddie	Episode; Sick as Our Secrets
2017	Nicky, Ricky, Dicky & Dawn	Susan	Episode; Not-So-Sweet Charity
2018–2019	Andi Mack	Kira	4 episodes
2019–2020	Sunnyside Up	Sienna	7 episodes
2020	One Day at a Time	Nora	3 episodes
2022	Black-ish	Teenaged Girl	Episode; Mom Mentor
2022	Raven's Home	Avery	Episode; The Grand Booker-Pest Hotel
2022	Quantum Leap	Stacy Thompson	Episode; Stand by Ben
2024–2025	Dexter: Original Sin	Sofia Rivera	8 episodes
