= Debra Morgan =

Fictional character created by Jeff Lindsay

- Dexter character
- Jennifer Carpenter as Debra Morgan
- First appearance: Novels: Darkly Dreaming Dexter (2004); Television: "Dexter" (2006)
- Last appearance: Novels: Dexter Is Dead (2015); Television: "Sins of the Father" (2022)
- Created by: Jeff Lindsay
- Portrayed by: Jennifer Carpenter; Molly Brown (young; Original Sin); Haley King (teenager); Laura Marano (young); Savannah Paige Rae (young)

In-universe information
- Full name: Debra Morgan
- Gender: Female
- Occupation: Police lieutenant (Miami Metro Homicide Division)
- Family: Harry Morgan (father; deceased); Doris Morgan (mother; deceased); Harry Morgan, Jr. (brother; deceased); Dexter Morgan (adoptive brother)
- Children: Novels: Nicholas Morgan (son)

Debra Morgan (spelled Deborah in the novels) is a fictional character created by Jeff Lindsay for his Dexter book series. In Lindsay's novels, she first appeared in Darkly Dreaming Dexter (2004) and was featured in every novel in the series. In the television series based on Lindsay's books, she is mainly portrayed by Jennifer Carpenter in Dexter and New Blood, and as a younger version of herself by Molly Brown in Original Sin.

Debra is the adoptive sister of the series' antihero protagonist Dexter Morgan.

== Character history ==
=== Early life ===
Debra was born to Doris (Kathrin Lautner Middleton) and Harry Morgan (James Remar) on December 7, 1979. She is the sister to Dexter Morgan (Michael C. Hall), whom Harry legally adopted after initially fostering Dexter immediately after rescuing him from the scene of his mother's murder when he was three years old, several years before Debra was born. A tough, foul-mouthed tomboy, she craved her father's attention and envied Dexter for the amount of time Harry spent with him, unaware that Harry was training him to be a vigilante serial killer.

When Debra was a teenager, her mother died of cancer. From then on, she decided to become a homicide detective, like her father, and took Harry's gun to practice shooting. Dexter found out and told Harry, who punished her. Hurt, Debra told Dexter that she wished that Harry had never brought him home. She was immediately remorseful for saying it, however, and apologized.

Debra was devastated when Harry died of an apparently accidental overdose of heart medication – unaware that he in fact committed suicide, unable to live with having trained Dexter to get away with murder. Soon afterward, she joined the Miami-Metro Police Department, where he had worked. She spent three years in patrol and then another two years in vice before being promoted by Captain Tom Matthews (Geoff Pierson) (a friend of her father), becoming a Homicide officer at the start of the first season.

Debra is characterized as smart and capable, yet unsure of herself, and so she relies upon Dexter's seemingly limitless expertise on murderers to solve difficult cases. Initially assigned to Vice, she is desperate to be transferred to Homicide. After Matthews promotes her, she starts to grow self-confident, relying less on Dexter's abilities and more on her own.

=== Season one ===
Newly promoted to the homicide department, Debra's first case is a series of murders committed by "The Ice Truck Killer", who preys on prostitutes and keeps their dismembered bodies in refrigerated trucks before dumping them on the streets of Miami. She works hard on the case, but her progress is hampered by her own insecurity and her antagonistic relationship with her commanding officer, Lieutenant Maria LaGuerta (Lauren Vélez).

She starts dating, and eventually falls in love with, Rudy Cooper (Christian Camargo); unbeknownst to her, he is actually the Ice Truck Killer, and is only dating her in order to get close to Dexter. At the end of the season, Rudy proposes to her and she accepts. Rudy – who is actually Brian Moser, Dexter's biological brother – then kidnaps her to reveal himself to Dexter. He binds her to a table in the same manner that Dexter kills his victims, while Dexter and Brian discuss her fate. Dexter ultimately saves her life, and reluctantly kills Brian to keep her safe.

=== Season two ===
Debra is frail at the start of season two, still recovering from her ordeal with the Ice Truck Killer, instinctively attacking a man at a bar after he touches her shoulder. FBI agent Frank Lundy (Keith Carradine) is assigned to the investigation into the Bay Harbor Butcher, and selects Debra, Sergeant Angel Batista (David Zayas), and forensics technician Vince Masuka (C.S. Lee) for his task force. Debra tries to leave the task force, reasoning that she is not a good detective if she could not tell her fiancé was a serial killer. Lundy says her closeness to one is why he chose her, and she agrees to remain on the task force.

Per Lundy's advice, Debra starts dating again and meets Gabriel (Dave Baez), whom she preemptively handcuffs during a sexual encounter out of fear he might try to kill her. Debra looks through Gabriel's email and finds that he has sent a book titled The Ice Princess to publishers, convincing her he is writing a tell-all book on her. After she breaks up with him, Lundy shows her the background check he ran on Gabriel, who turns out to be an aspiring children's author, and Debra surmises that The Ice Princess is a children's book.

Debra unintentionally reveals to Dexter's nemesis Sgt. James Doakes (Erik King) that Dexter is faking his drug addiction, reigniting his pursuit of Dexter, and becomes jealous of Lundy trying to seek Dexter out instead of her. She comes to terms with Lundy's preference before he explains he just wants to get away from Masuka. Debra and Lundy develop a romantic relationship, which ends when he is called away from Miami. She stays in Dexter's house while she deals with the trauma.

Debra is appalled when she finds out that Dexter is cheating on his girlfriend, Rita Bennett (Julie Benz), with his Narcotics Anonymous sponsor, Lila Tournay (Jaime Murray), of whom she is immediately suspicious. Debra eventually threatens to have Lila deported upon finding out that she murdered her ex-boyfriend. In the season finale, "The British Invasion", she helps Dexter rescue Rita's two children from a fire that Lila had started.

By the end of the season, she has regained her confidence, and she is more determined than ever to improve her career and get a detective shield.

=== Season three ===
As season three begins, Debra has had her hair cut to shoulder length, and has "sworn off men, liquor and smokes". She is working with a new partner, Detective Joey Quinn (Desmond Harrington), but has been approached by Internal Affairs officer Yuki Amado (Liza Lapira), who tells her that her partner is being investigated for corruption. She refuses to assist in the investigation, however.

She is originally part of the team investigating the murder of Miguel Prado's (Jimmy Smits) brother Oscar (Nick Hermz), but because of her lack of tact and people skills she is removed from the case by the newly promoted Batista. The case she has been assigned to, the murder of a young woman, is eventually found to have been connected to the ongoing case of a serial killer called "The Skinner" (Jesse Borrego), which she solves with the help of confidential informant Anton Briggs (David Ramsey). The two begin a relationship after she saves his life. Because of her success on the Skinner case, Debra receives her detective shield at the end of the season. She also serves as Dexter's best man at his and Rita's wedding.

=== Season four ===
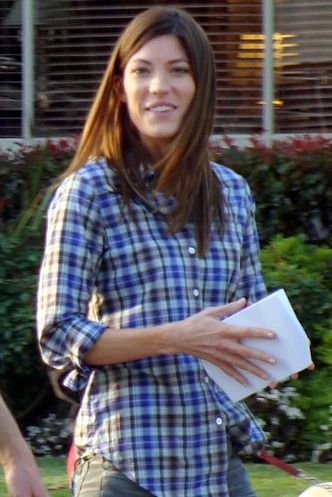
Jennifer Carpenter portrayed Debra Morgan for all eight seasons of Dexter.

At the beginning of the season, Dexter tells Debra that Harry slept with one of his confidential informants. She investigates the files on Harry's informants and interviews them, hoping to find the one Harry slept with. One of the files is shown to be Laura Moser (Sage Kirkpatrick). Her relationship with Anton begins to suffer at this point, especially when Lundy returns to Miami to hunt the Trinity Killer (John Lithgow). They sleep together and renew their relationship, but the very same night they are both shot – Lundy fatally – by an unknown assailant. Debra blames herself, and laments to Dexter that she is "broken". She puts aside her grief when she comes to suspect that the Trinity Killer was the shooter, and opens an investigation.

After consulting with forensics technician Vince Masuka (C. S. Lee), however, Debra deduces that Trinity could not have been the shooter. During a Thanksgiving dinner with Dexter's family, Debra remembers a conversation she had with reporter Christine Hill (Courtney Ford), and realizes Hill has knowledge of the shooting that no one outside the police department knew about, and concludes that she was the shooter. This is proven true in a later episode revealing that Hill is Trinity's daughter. Hill confesses to Debra that she killed Lundy, moments before she commits suicide. Debra then renews her search for Harry's mistress, and finds out about Laura Moser, and the fact that Dexter and the Ice Truck Killer are brothers. She tells Dexter the news (which he already knew), and then tells him that he is "the one consistently good thing" in her life.

=== Season five ===
Debra arrives at the scene of Rita's murder and arranges her funeral in lieu of Dexter becoming distant. While cleaning the crime scene, she and Quinn become intimate. She later calls Dexter when he avoids a meeting with the FBI, and attends Rita's funeral. Dexter, Astor, and Cody move into Debra's home, and Debra becomes frustrated with not having much space and goes to Quinn's house, who tries getting her to admit they had intercourse. Miami Metro begins investigating the Santa Muerte cult murders following the discovery of a woman's severed head. Debra works with Cira (April Lee Hernández) on the case, the pair questioning a store owner that sells the Santa Muerte items found at the scene. They later find his severed head and corpse, and Debra consoles Cira after she blames herself for his death. Debra gets Dexter to help investigate the Santa Muerte case, and is part of Batista's unit to catch their primary suspect Carlos Fuentes. In a standoff with Debra, he slits the throat of his hostage. Debra and Batista visit the hostage in the hospital, learning of a tattoo connected to the Santa Muerte gang. Debra and Cira discovers two corpses in a house, concluding Fuentes and his brother committed it. Debra also discovers that the logo was really referring to the nightclub Club Mayan. Debra mistakes Quinn for having an affair, and he introduces her to Stan Liddy (Peter Weller), leaving out that the latter is investigating Dexter. Debra and Angel stake out the Club Mayan until Debra leaves to investigate a crime scene at a warehouse, arriving with Masuka just after Dexter finishes arranging the crime scene.

Debra arrives on the scene after a truck carrying barrels with dead women inside is found. Debra disagrees with LaGuerta on Cira getting close to the Fuentes brothers during their sting operation at Club Mayan, and kills Carlos after he takes another hostage. Debra argues with LaGuerta after the latter tells her that she intends to blame Cira for the shooting, offering herself up to take the fall. LaGuerta later announces Debra's culpability to the press, and an enraged Debra confronts her for not telling her in advance. She deduces that Cira was the one who backed LaGuerta. Debra is demoted to the file room, where she finds evidence in the closed Barrel Girls file indicating the involvement of multiple other perpetrators. She helps Dexter find Astor, and meets Lumen Pierce (Julia Stiles), who Dexter claims is just his tenant. Debra confronts LaGuerta over her reluctance to reopen the case, convincing her to reopen the case, and learns from her that Quinn was suspended for trying to investigate Dexter. Debra confronts Quinn, who admits to having thought Dexter was Kyle Butler, and she breaks off their relationship for his lack of honesty. The police find DVDs the killers recorded of the crimes, and Debra is assigned to study them. She figures out that Jordan Chase (Jonny Lee Miller), a prominent public speaker, is involved with the group of men killing the girls, but cannot prove her suspicion because he never appears on the DVDs. However, she is able to track him down by the end of the season, and finds his body, moments after Dexter and Lumen have killed him. She sees them at the crime scene through a wall of plastic sheeting, and tells them that she needs to call in the crime scene. She gives them an hour head start because she sympathizes with Lumen, but she never finds out that Dexter was involved.

=== Season six ===
At the start of the season, Quinn proposes to Debra, but she rejects him and ends their relationship. The ensuing awkwardness is made worse when she is promoted to Lieutenant, thanks in part to LaGuerta's political machinations. Debra earns the respect of the office, but struggles with the idea of some people not feeling "open" to her anymore because of her new job. The job is also very stressful in itself, and she comes to doubt whether she can handle the responsibility. Her work and personal troubles weighing down on her, she begins to attend therapy. Matthews attempts to make a deal with her about covering up his involvement in the death of a prostitute, but before she can take any action, LaGuerta tells Matthews's superiors about his indiscretion and lets Debra take the fall for it. At the end of the season, her therapist helps her realize that she has been in love with Dexter all along. She finally makes peace with the idea – on the same day that she catches Dexter in the act of murdering "Doomsday Killer" Travis Marshall (Colin Hanks).

=== Season seven ===
In the season premiere, Debra witnesses Dexter murder Travis Marshall. Dexter claims that he went to collect evidence, and was surprised by Marshall; he then says that he "snapped" and killed him on impulse. Debra reluctantly helps him burn down the abandoned church where he killed Marshall, destroying the evidence of the crime. Later, Dexter comes home to Debra, who is surrounded by Dexter's victim's blood slides, a pack of knives, and other tools that Dexter uses to kill. Debra reluctantly asks Dexter if he is a serial killer. Dexter, taken aback, replies that he is. Horrified, Debra recoils from Dexter as he admits that he is the "Bay Harbor Butcher", and that Harry taught him how to get away with murder.

After reading Lundy's files on serial killers, Debra says she wants to help Dexter, and make sure he doesn't kill again. Dexter agrees, even though he doesn't really have a choice, as Debra (probably) would have arrested him. Dexter slips away from Debra long enough to dispose of Ray Speltzer (Matt Gerald), a serial killer she had tried and failed to send to prison. Debra admits that she understands why Dexter takes the law into his own hands, and tells him that she will not stop him as long as he does not tell her about it or interfere with Miami Metro investigations. She even compromises her own professional ethics by falsifying evidence to mislead LaGuerta, who is trying to reopen the Bay Harbor Butcher case.

Their truce is threatened when Dexter begins dating Hannah McKay (Yvonne Strahovski), a serial poisoner whom Debra is intent on arresting for the murder of Sal Price (Santiago Cabrera), a writer she had feelings for. Debra eventually confesses her feelings for Dexter in a moment of frustration. Debra gets into a near-fatal car accident after a confrontation with Hannah. She is convinced Hannah poisoned her, and Dexter is suspicious enough to order a toxicology screen on a bottle of water in Debra's car. The results prove that Hannah did indeed poison Debra, leaving Dexter no choice but to give Debra evidence proving that Hannah killed Price. Debra is on hand to arrest Hannah, as a heartbroken Dexter looks on.

In the season finale, Debra rushes to Dexter's side when LaGuerta has him arrested for the Bay Harbor Butcher murders, and angrily confronts LaGuerta before being told to recuse herself. Dexter is released, however, thanks to the evidence that Debra tampered with. The next day, LaGuerta calls her into her office under the pretext of apologizing – and confronts her with circumstantial evidence that she was near the church at the time it was destroyed. Debra talks her way out of immediate danger, but fears that LaGuerta will soon have definitive proof of what she and Dexter had done. Later, at Batista's New Year's Eve party, she learns that LaGuerta has gone in pursuit of Dexter, who she fears is in the act of killing Hector Estrada (Nestor Serrano), the man who ordered his mother's murder. She goes to the scene, where she finds Dexter poised to shoot an unconscious LaGuerta. As she pleads with Dexter not to do it, LaGuerta regains consciousness and urges Debra to kill her brother. Resigned, Dexter tells Debra to "do what you gotta do". Desperate to save Dexter, Debra shoots and kills LaGuerta, and breaks down in tears over her body.

=== Season eight ===
Six months after LaGuerta's death, Debra's life has gone into a tailspin: She has quit her job, started drinking heavily, and cut off all contact with Dexter. Now working as a private investigator, she is chasing after – and sleeping with – drug dealer Andrew Briggs (Rhys Coiro). Dexter shows up at her hotel and tells her that an assassin named El Sapo (Nick Gomez) is coming to kill her and Briggs; Debra responds that she does not care. When Briggs tries to scare Dexter off, Dexter kills him, and pleads with Debra to leave with him. Debra refuses, however. El Sapo finds Debra as she searches for Briggs's stolen merchandise and beats her up. In a state of shock, she shoots him dead. When Dexter finds out what Debra has done, she asks him to cover up the crime, which he does.

Debra is arrested for drunk driving, and calls Quinn to bail her out. Quinn tells Dexter what happened, and Dexter insists on taking Debra to dinner to talk to her. At dinner, he shows Debra footage of her saving a man's life and tells her that she is still a good person. A few days later, Debra walks into Miami Metro, blind drunk, and confesses to Quinn that she killed LaGuerta. Thinking she doesn't know what she's saying, Quinn calls Dexter for help. Dexter arrives with Dr. Evelyn Vogel (Charlotte Rampling), an old friend of Harry's who knows that Dexter is a serial killer. Just as Debra is about to tell Quinn the truth about LaGuerta's death, Dexter renders her unconscious with the same tranquilizer he uses on his victims, and takes her back to his apartment. There, he asks Vogel to help her.

Vogel tells Debra that she had no other choice but to protect Dexter, and shows her recorded interviews with Harry expressing his guilt over training Dexter to kill; in these interviews, Debra learns the truth about her father's death. She reaches out to Dexter, asking him to take a drive with her so they can talk. Once on the road, Debra seizes the steering wheel and plunges the car into the bay, intent on killing herself and her brother. She is rescued, however, and saves Dexter's life by swimming to the car and pulling him out. Debra goes to a resentful Dexter for help when Vogel is kidnapped. While the two of them track Vogel down, Debra tells Dexter that she had saved his life because she couldn't imagine hers without him in it. They find Vogel at the mercy of one of her former patients, serial killer A.J. Yates (Aaron McCusker); Dexter kills him to protect Debra. Dexter and Debra admit they need each other, and they reconcile.

Debra and Dexter are both non-lethally poisoned by Hannah, who has escaped from prison. Debra demands that Dexter get her out of their lives, and starts surveilling her. When Dexter appears reluctant, Debra goes to her boss Jacob Elway (Sean Patrick Flanery) and offers to apprehend Hannah for a substantial reward. She tries to capture Hannah, who says the only reason she spared her life was because she didn't want to hurt Dexter. Debra reluctantly drops the case, and even allows Hannah to hide from the police in her apartment.

Debra stops by her old precinct, and Batista offers to reinstate her as a detective. She wants the job, but she knows that she cannot do it while harboring a fugitive and turning a blind eye to Dexter's crimes. To further complicate the situation, she and Quinn, who is now in a relationship with Batista's sister Jamie (Aimee Garcia), share a kiss. Dexter tells her that he, Hannah and Harrison are going to move to Argentina. Debra is saddened, but gives him her blessing when she sees how happy he is with his new family. The following day, she takes the job at Miami Metro, and renews her relationship with Quinn.

In her first case, Debra helps Dexter catch Oliver Saxon (Darri Ingólfsson), a serial killer known as "the Brain Surgeon". Dexter ultimately decides not to kill him, however, and asks her to arrest Saxon. Debra arrives just as Saxon is killing Deputy U.S. Marshal Cooper (Kenny Johnson) and draws her weapon. However, Saxon gets the drop on her and shoots her in the abdomen. In the series' final episode, "Remember the Monsters?", Debra is taken to the hospital, where she tells Quinn she loves him and wishes Dexter a happy life. However, moments later, she suffers a massive stroke that leaves her in a persistent vegetative state. After killing Saxon, Dexter goes to see her in the hospital as it is being evacuated in the midst of a hurricane. He tearfully removes her life support as an act of mercy, carries her body to his boat and buries her at sea.

=== Dexter: New Blood ===
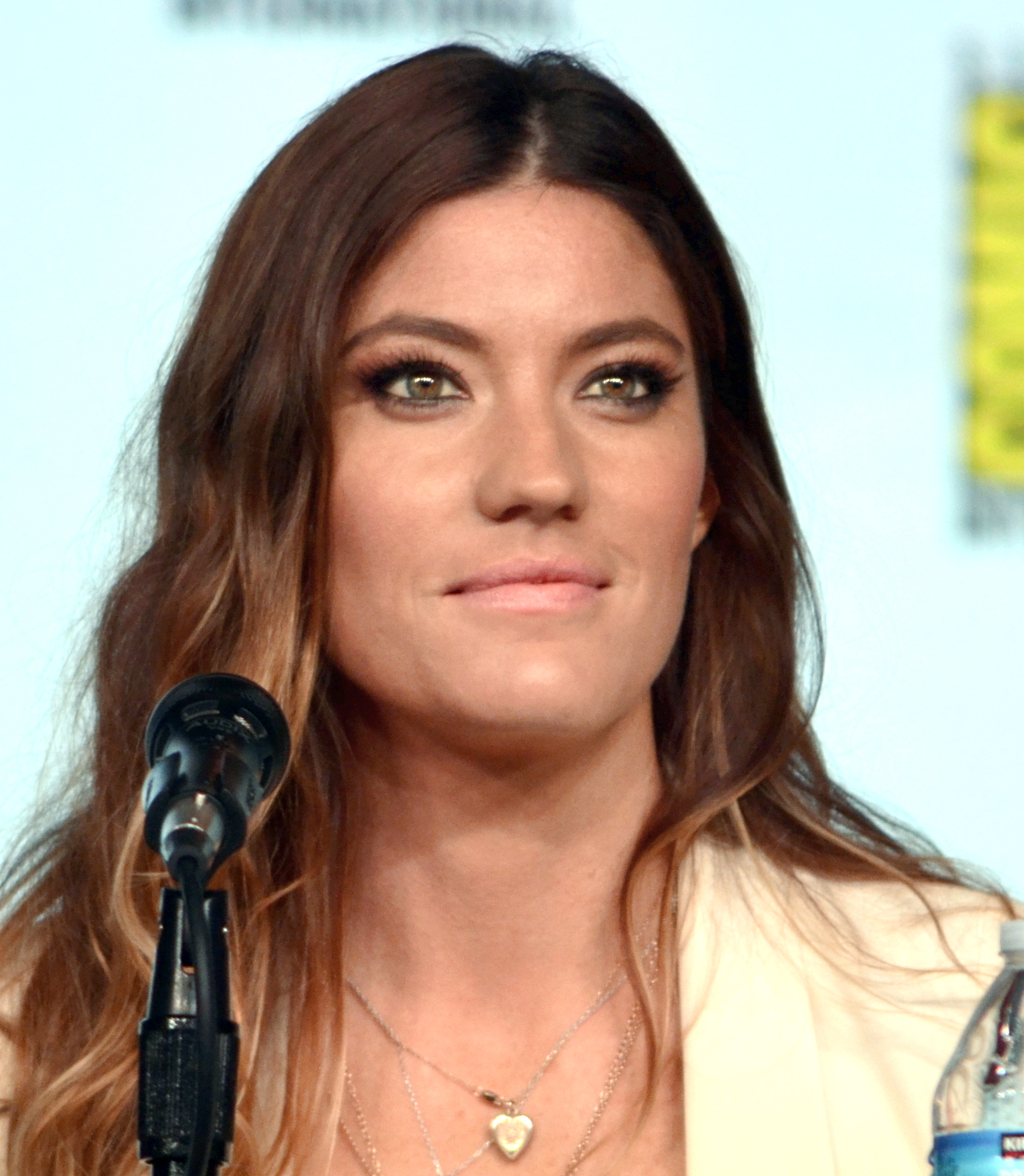
Jennifer Carpenter reprised her role as Debra Morgan in Dexter: New Blood.

In the revival series, Dexter: New Blood, Debra has replaced Harry in Dexter's mind as his "Dark Passenger". Unlike Harry, however, Debra gives Dexter – who has abstained from murder for nearly a decade – advice on how not to kill. When Dexter "falls off the wagon" by impulsively murdering Matt Caldwell (Steve M. Robertson), a stockbroker from a wealthy family who once got away with killing five people, she chastises him, but nevertheless advises him on the best way to destroy the evidence and lead his girlfriend, local police chief Angela Bishop (Julia Jones), to believe that Caldwell is still alive.

When a teenage Harrison (Jack Alcott) tracks him down, Debra pleads with Dexter to stay out of the boy's life, insisting that everyone who gets close to Dexter ends up dead. Dexter ultimately ignores her, however, and once again becomes a father to the boy. Debra helps Dexter realize that Harrison has a "Dark Passenger" of his own, and pleads with her brother not to teach Harrison to kill the same way Harry did. Eventually, however, Dexter decides to teach Harrison the "Code of Harry", and the two of them kill Caldwell's father Kurt (Clancy Brown), a serial killer who has been preying on teenage girls for 25 years.

In the series finale, "Sins of the Father", Debra berates Dexter for getting caught after Angela arrests him for Caldwell's murder, and ridicules the idea that he and Harrison could be "father and son" serial killers. Later, after Harrison shoots and critically wounds Dexter, Debra holds her brother's hand.

== Casting and characterization ==
Jennifer Carpenter read the script for the Dexter pilot and believed it would not get put on television based on what she felt was its energy and excitement. When she dropped her pages of sides and uttered a profanity, akin to Debra's manner of speech, she felt her first connection with the character and desire to have the role. Callum Murray of Game Rant calls Debra "arguably the second most important character in the Dexter-verse after the serial killer himself". Brendan Bettinger noted that since the start of the series, "when she was just a pawn in the game of Dexter's serial killer brother, Deb has functioned as a bit of a Job for the writers." Bettinger furthered that Carpenter's performance "has always been a bit ahead of the material they've given her" before the material finally matched her skill by the fourth season. Miranda Wicker describes Debra and Dexter's relationship as the central relationship of the series and that the vulgar Debra had tethered Dexter "to the world of normal humans."

During the sixth season, Debra develops romantic feelings for Dexter. In an interview, showrunner Scott Buck said the writer room for years had felt "that this character was in love with her brother" and though they ignored it for years, it "just kept coming back until we were all in agreement that it was just in the DNA of that character of why she was the way she was."

Debra discovers Dexter murdering Travis Marshall at the end of the sixth season, and finds out that he is a serial killer shortly thereafter. Michael C. Hall stated that the idea of Debra learning who Dexter really was had always been a possibility if the show lasted long enough and that for Debra it was "probably simultaneously horrifying, of course, to discover what she's discovered, but also to some degree a relief, or answer some previously unanswered questions she had about her brother and her own childhood." Fowler writes that Debra wanting to try and fix Dexter through a companion-style intervention reminded him of Rita placing Dexter in an addict support group during the second season and that as Dexter's sister, it was fitting that she came out of reading Lundy's psychological profile of the Butcher "seemingly more worried about Dexter being caught than anything else." Joshua Alston notes Debra's "season-long identity crisis" and refers to her exchange with Hannah, in which the latter questions how she is fine with her being punished for her murders while letting Dexter get off with his, as showing that the three are alike in their self-preservation instincts but differ as Hannah admits hers while Debra and Dexter are "bound by a deep, profound hypocrisy."

Carpenter found out Debra would not survive near the end of the hiatus, and her only stipulation was not wanting Dexter to kill her, preferring a suicide before coming around to the death as it was depicted in the series proper. She wanted the character to die and was unsure of "know what kind of peace she would have found there because Dexter always would have been in that place. She always would have been making sure she was piling enough dirt on the secrets that existed with Dexter. I'm not sure a happy ending was possible for her. This was her happy ending." Executive producer Sara Colleton said that while Debra's death was not planned from the beginning of the series, they mapped it out two years in advance and that Debra's death "was the only fitting punishment" for Dexter instead of his own demise.

In July 2021, it was announced Carpenter would reprise her role in Dexter: New Blood. Carpenter first had conversations with Showtime in 2019 on a possible Dexter revival and how her character would be involved. She "wanted to come back and haunt him, comfort him, console him, encourage him, love him, hate him, and ruin him." Carpenter began her acting preparation with an imagining of Dexter pulling Debra from Heaven before she realized "that it was his hell, not hers. She's resting in peace." At the start of New Blood, it has been 10 years since Dexter killed anyone, which Hall says allows him to "have this imagined relationship with his dead sister that he wasn't able to have even when she was alive." It is only as he starts to kill again that the previously "placid, serene, soothing" visions of Debra become more antagonistic, as she represents the internal struggle Dexter is having.

In May 2024, Molly Brown was cast as Debra in the prequel series Dexter: Original Sin. Brown said she had never "gotten to play the entire emotional bandwidth of a character the way that I got to with this role" and noted that she had a similar way of speaking to the character, reflecting that she had previously been told "when a role is meant for you it will be for you, and I truly think me getting this opportunity is proof of that."

In 2025, Carpenter confirmed she would not appear in Dexter: Resurrection: "I am pretty focused where I am, and I feel like I've completed that box. I'm proud of it. I hope that they're having a wonderful time. And I'm so happy for the fans to have more to chew on."

== Romantic relationships ==
Debra is known to have very bad relationships with men. Her first boyfriend on the series is a mechanic named Sean who turns out to be married. She then has a relationship with prosthetist Rudy Cooper, who is revealed to be the Ice Truck Killer and ends up kidnapping her with the intent for Dexter to kill her.

In season two, she starts going out with a man named Gabriel whom she met at the gym, and whom she suspects (incorrectly) of trying to use her notoriety following the Ice Truck Killer case to jumpstart his writing career. After that ends, she goes out with Frank Lundy, a man 25 years her senior who has to leave Miami at the end of season two, although she resumes her relationship with him in season four. She then starts a relationship with her Confidential Informant Anton Briggs. She breaks up with him to resume her relationship with Lundy, who is murdered. In the season five premiere she sleeps with her partner, Joey Quinn, who tries unsuccessfully to move the relationship into something more than purely sexual. By the end of season 6, she comes to believe that she is in love with her adoptive brother, Dexter – only to find out that he is a serial killer. In season 7, she has feelings for true crime writer Sal Price, but he is murdered as well. At the end of season 8, Debra and Joey rekindle their relationship before she ultimately dies.

== Differences from the novels ==
In the books, the character's name is spelled "Deborah", and she is described as "voluptuous" in contrast to her slim appearance on the TV show. In the novel Darkly Dreaming Dexter, Deborah finds out that Dexter is a serial killer, and appears to accept it, although she is sometimes torn between her love for her brother and her duty as a cop. In the TV series, Debra remains unaware of Dexter's "hobby" until the final episode of season six, when she witnesses Dexter killing Travis Marshall.

At the conclusion of Dexter is Delicious, Deborah is pregnant by her boyfriend, Kyle Chutsky, and in Double Dexter we learn that she gave birth to a son, Nicholas, and raises him alone.

In Dexter's Final Cut, Deborah disowns Dexter after he cheats on Rita and unintentionally allows pedophile Robert Chase to kill Rita and kidnap Astor. In Dexter Is Dead, Deborah takes custody of Cody, Astor, and Dexter's daughter Lily Ann after Dexter is imprisoned for Rita's murder; she knows that Dexter is innocent of that particular crime but believes that he belongs in prison. After Dexter is freed thanks to his brother Brian's machinations, she refuses to let him see the children and communicates with him only to get him to sign the paperwork to finalize the adoption. However, she is forced to rely on him when Cody, Astor and Nicholas are kidnapped by a Mexican drug lord who is out to get Brian. The three of them team up to infiltrate the drug lord's yacht and rescue the children, and Deborah and Dexter repair their relationship. Deborah saves Dexter's life by killing the drug lord just as he has her wounded brother at his mercy. Moments later, however, Dexter is seemingly killed when the yacht explodes; in the final moments of the novel, he sees Deborah trying to save him.

== Reception ==
Jennifer Carpenter's portrayal of Debra Morgan has received critical praise. Debra is considered one of the best Dexter characters, ranking #2 in lists by WhatCulture and CBR (behind Dexter). Australian journalist Jack Marx described her portrayal of "cool and clumsy" Debra as "so perfect that many viewers appear to have mistaken the character's flaws for the actor's." Screen Rant calls Debra "the most underrated character in the whole series" who differed from other, more simplistic Dexter characters as she showed "many different, and sometimes conflicting, sides to her personality because she has been through so much." Her role in the seventh season, in which she struggles between her loyalty to her brother and her duty as a member of law enforcement, was acclaimed. Nick Harley wrote that the ending of the seventh season concluded "a solid season performance from Jennifer Carpenter, who turned Deb from annoying, foul mouthed sister, into emotionally complex and deeply conflicted and compromised secret lover." Joshua Alston of A.V. Club wrote that the seventh season gave him a newfound appreciation for Carpenter but admitted it could "be because it suddenly feels like the performance and the story are well-matched", remarking that the season featured the best writing for Debra since the second season. For her portrayal of the character, she has been nominated for seven Saturn Awards for Best Supporting Actress on Television, in 2007, 2008, 2010, 2011, 2012, and 2013, winning in 2009 for her performance in season three. She has also been nominated four times as part of the ensemble cast for the Screen Actors Guild Award for Outstanding Performance by an Ensemble in a Drama Series in 2009, 2010, 2011, and 2012.

Screen Rant ranked Debra on their "10 Annoying TV Characters That Viewers Are Supposed To Like, But Can't Stand" list, and she ranked sixteenth on BuzzFeed's "18 Main TV Characters That Fans Absolutely Despised" list. The season four revelation of Debra discovering the identities of Dexter's mother and brother was mixed, Matt Fowler finding it "a touch empty" while Emily St. James saw it "a promising development for when the show inevitably wants to" start winding down to its conclusion. Her decision to let Dexter and Lumen go in the fifth season finale, without learning who they were, was viewed as a red herring and preserving the status quo of the series. Chris Holt of Starburst called Debra "kind of interesting and likeable, but her turbulent love life combined with the previously mentioned marriage of convenience sometimes makes the whole thing seem like CSI Miami written as soap opera." The character's romantic feelings for her adopted brother Dexter were heavily panned. Ken Tucker bemoaned the revelation for having "rendered Deb a far less strong character in every way this season" and hurting the show's quality. Joseph Kratzer wrote that the only consistency Debra had "seen in terms of any of the arcs she's been put on throughout the series, especially in these last few seasons, is her apparent need to be coupled with a man." Commentators were mixed on Debra's death in the series finale of Dexter, with some liking it, others feeling that she should have lived, or that the death could have been executed better. Brian Frydenborg felt it was unfair for her "to die and pay the biggest price", and Joseph Kratzer of WhatCulture lamented that her death being in the series finale meant there was no time to explore the aftermath of her passing.

The character's posthumous role in New Blood was met with mixed responses. The Guardian called the decision to bring her back "undoubtedly a smart move", and LaToya Ferguson opined that Carpenter "arguably gives the most compelling performance of the series, somehow even livelier as Deb in death, while still being recognizable." Conversely, Jen Chaney saw her appearances as grating at times, and Alan Sepinwall, while praising Debra as the original series' most interesting supporting character, lamented that she "is still dead, and while she's a more entertaining ghost than Harry was, there's only so much to do with her."

Molly Brown's portrayal of Debra in Original Sin was praised, with Brittany Frederick of CBR acknowledging that she may be a more accurate version of a younger Debra than Patrick Gibson was as Dexter. Brian Tallerico wrote that neither Brown or the writers knew what to do with Debra "in part because Brown seems miscast but more because her involvement here feels like fan service more than character-driven writing". Erik Kain of Forbes praised the performance, but added that Brown was "not nearly tall or skinny enough" compared to Carpenter and wrote that playing a convincing younger version of the character "means that she's also incredibly annoying and abrasive."
