= Molly Brown (actress) =

American actress

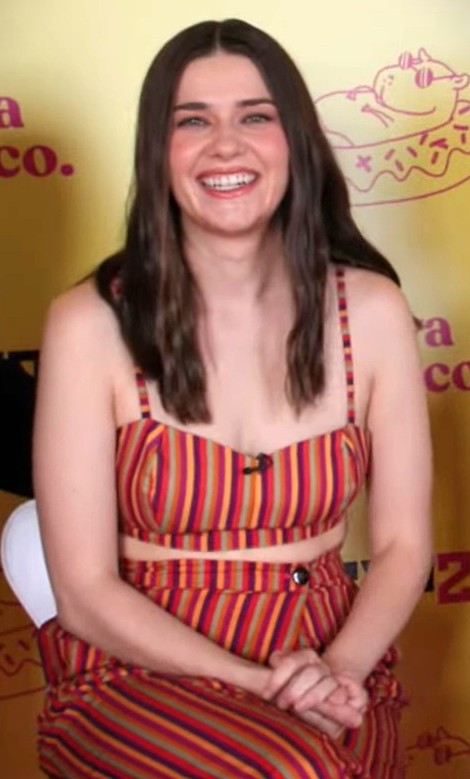
- Brown in 2024
- Born: July 1, 1994 (age 32); Cedar Rapids, Iowa, U.S.
- Education: University of Iowa
- Occupation: Actress
- Years active: 2016–present
- Relatives: Tom Riley (grandfather)

Molly Brown is an American actress best known for her roles as Debra Morgan in the Showtime crime drama mystery series Dexter: Original Sin (2024–2025) and as Leslie Ackhurst in the Paramount+ series Evil (2022–2024).

== Early life and education ==
Molly Brown was born on July 1, 1994, in Cedar Rapids. In 2011 during high school, Brown attended Stagedoor Manor in Loch Sheldrake, New York, and was one of 140 students who sang and danced in the opening number of Macy's Thanksgiving Day Parade.

== Career ==
Brown has held many minor television roles appearing in episodes of Law & Order: Special Victims Unit, High Maintenance and The Marvelous Mrs. Maisel.

In 2020, Brown landed a role in Netflix mystery drama film Lost Girls as Missy. In 2021, Brown was cast as Emily Good in comedy drama The Good House alongside Sigourney Weaver.

Brown has recurring roles starring as Elizabeth Prince in Showtime drama series Billions and as Leslie Ackhurst in Paramount+ series Evil.

In 2024, Brown starred in the Dexter prequel Dexter: Original Sin playing the role of a young Debra Morgan.

== Personal life ==
Brown is the granddaughter of notable Iowa attorney Tom Riley of Cedar Rapids, Iowa. She came out as a lesbian in an Instagram post in 2019.

== Filmography ==
=== Television ===
Year	Title	Role	Notes
2016	Conviction	Emily Price	1 episode
2018	Gone	Emily	1 episode
2018	A Crime to Remember	Barbara Mackle	1 episode
2018	High Maintenance	Maddy	1 episode
2018	Law & Order: Special Victims Unit	Jenni Hanson	1 episode
2018	The Marvelous Mrs. Maisel	Leah	1 episode
2020	Chicago Med	Molly Myers	1 episode
2021	FBI: International	Ella Clancy	1 episode
2021–2022	Billions	Elizabeth Prince	2 episodes
2023	Last Week Tonight with John Oliver	Voiceover	1 episode
2022–2024	Evil	Leslie Ackhurst	7 episodes
2024–2025	Dexter: Original Sin	Debra Morgan	Main role
2025	Grey's Anatomy	Maisie Lawrence	1 episode

=== Film ===
Year	Title	Role
2020	Lost Girls	Missy
2021	The Good House	Emily Good
2022	Senior Year	Young Martha Reiser
2024	Bloody Axe Wound	Sam Crane
2025	Mooch	Dina
