= Patrick Gibson (actor) =

Irish actor (born 1995)

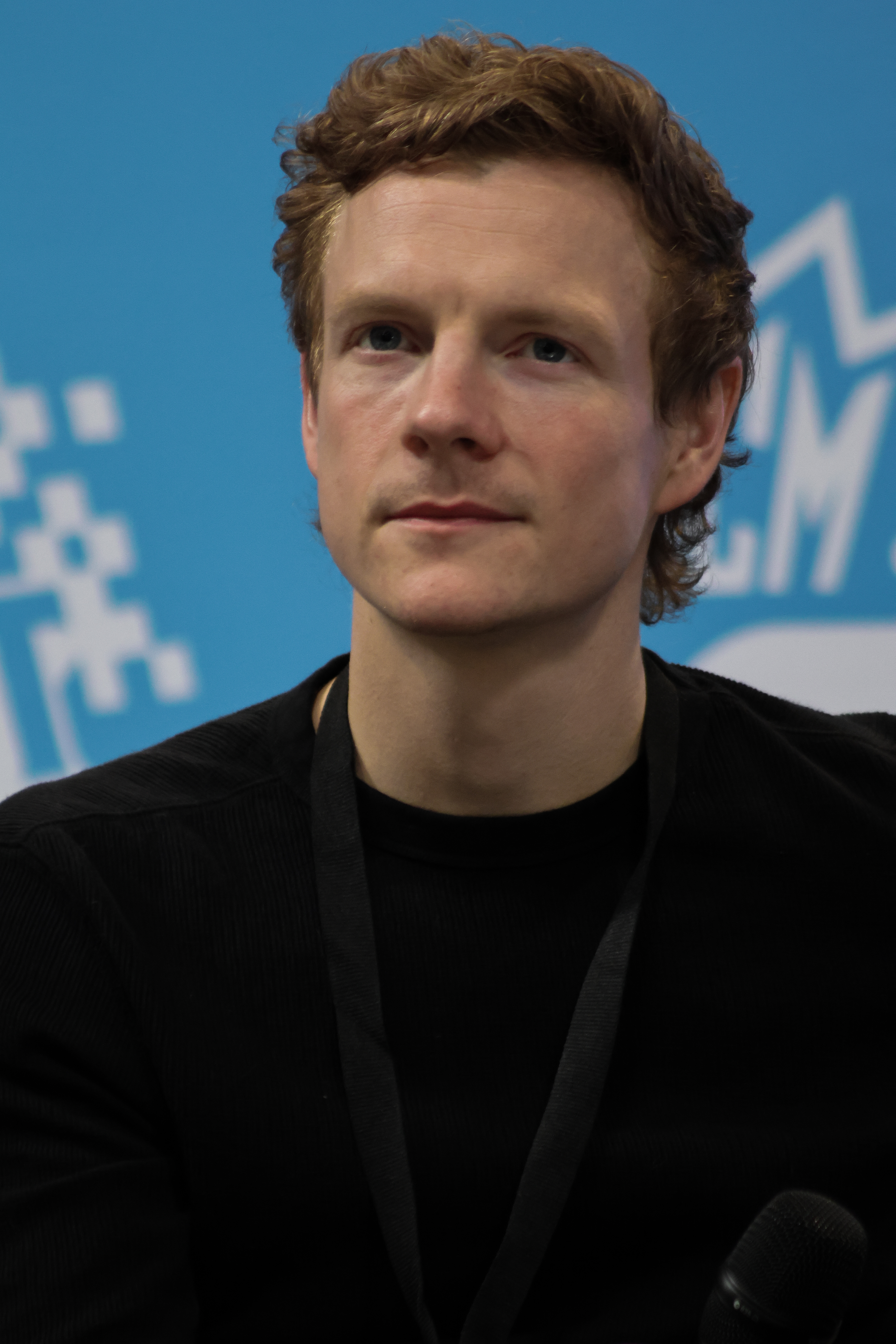
- Gibson at MCM Birmingham 2026
- Born: Patrick Leo Kenny-Gibson; 19 April 1995 (age 31); Dublin, Ireland
- Occupation: Actor
- Years active: 2007–present

Patrick Leo Kenny-Gibson (born 19 April 1995) is an Irish actor. He began his career with roles in the television series The Tudors (2009), The Passing Bells (2014), The OA (2016–2019), The White Princess (2017), Shadow and Bone (2023), and the film Tolkien (2019). From 2024–2025, Gibson starred as a young Dexter Morgan in the prequel series Dexter: Original Sin. Gibson stars as James Bond in the video game 007 First Light (2026).

== Early life ==
Patrick Leo Kenny-Gibson was born on 19 April 1995 in Dublin. His father is also an actor and his mother works in marketing. His brother, William, also acted but is now a cardiologist in Montreal, Canada. The family lived in Greystones, then Stillorgan, and later Donnybrook. Gibson attended Gonzaga College.

Gibson began his studies in philosophy at Trinity College Dublin, but left halfway through his degree in 2016 upon being cast in The OA.

== Career ==
Gibson was awarded Rising Star at the 2017 IFTAs. In September 2025, it was revealed that Gibson would portray James Bond in the 2026 video game, 007 First Light.

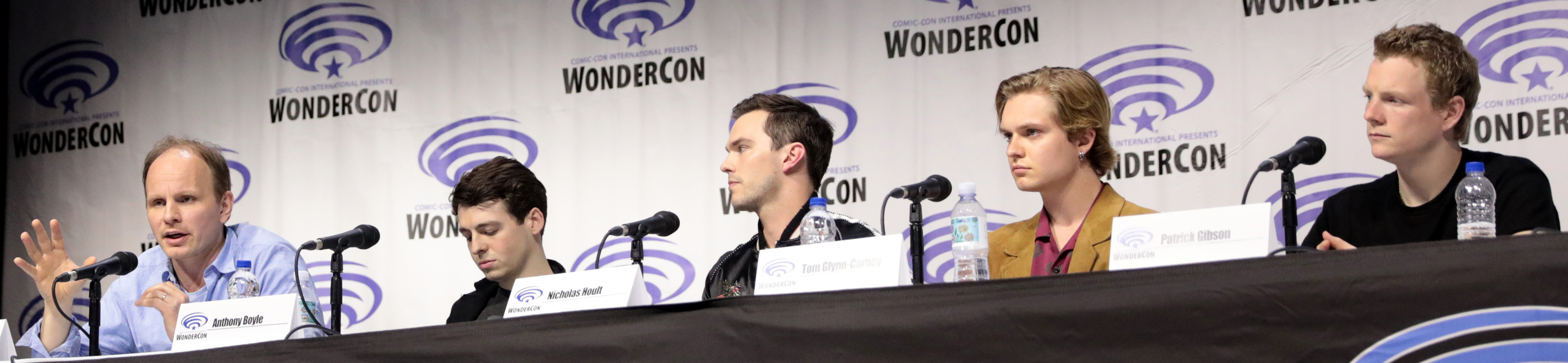
The cast of Tolkien at WonderCon 2019 in Anaheim, California. From left to right: director Dome Karukoski, Anthony Boyle, Nicholas Hoult, Tom Glynn-Carney, and Patrick Gibson.

Gibson portrayed Robert Gilson, one of J. R. R. Tolkien’s close friends, in the 2019 biographical film Tolkien, alongside Nicholas Hoult and Lily Collins. The film depicts the life of the English professor, philologist, and author of The Hobbit, The Lord of the Rings, and The Silmarillion.

== Personal life ==
Since early 2024, Gibson has been in a relationship with American actress Maude Apatow.

== Filmography ==
=== Film ===
Year	Title	Role	Notes
2012	What Richard Did	Jake	
2014	Luke	Luke	Short film
2014	Gold	Devon	
2015	Hunters Fall	James	Short film
2015	Cherry Tree	Brian Kelly / Devil	
2016	Property of the State	Brendan	
2016	Their Finest	Rex	
2018	In a Relationship	Matt	
2018	The Darkest Minds	Clancy Gray	
2019	Tolkien	Robert Gilson	
2021	2003	Jamie	Short film
2022	Good Girl Jane	Jamie	
2023	The Portable Door	Paul Carpenter	
TBA	Play Dead	TBA	Post-production

=== Television ===
Year	Title	Role	Notes
2007	Sherlock Holmes and the Baker Street Irregulars	Laundry Boy	Television film
2009	The Tudors	Son of Aske	3 episodes
2011	Primeval	Steve	Episode: "Breakfast Club"
2011	Neverland	Curly	2 episodes
2014	The Passing Bells	Thomas	5 episodes
2016–2019	The OA	Steve Winchell	14 episodes
2017	The White Princess	Perkin Warbeck / Prince Richard	4 episodes
2017	Guerrilla	Connor	3 episodes
2019	The Spanish Princess	The Boy	2 episodes
2021–2023	Before We Die	Christian Radic	9 episodes
2023	Shadow and Bone	Nikolai Lantsov	8 episodes
2024–2025	Dexter: Original Sin	Dexter Morgan	Main role

=== Video games ===
Year	Title	Role	Notes
2026	007 First Light	James Bond	Voice and motion capture
