= Dexter season 2 =

Drama series

Dexter
- Season 2
- DVD cover
- Showrunner: Clyde Phillips
- Starring: Michael C. Hall; Julie Benz; Jennifer Carpenter; Erik King; C. S. Lee; Lauren Vélez; David Zayas; James Remar
- No. of episodes: 12

Release
- Original network: Showtime
- Original release: September 30 – December 16, 2007

Season chronology
- ← Previous; Season 1 Next → Season 3

The second season of Dexter premiered on September 30, 2007, and ended on December 16, 2007. Starting with this season, the show no longer adapts the Dexter novels. The season premiere "It's Alive!" attracted 1.01 million viewers in the United States, making Dexter the first Showtime series to attract more than a million viewers with a season premiere. The season finale, "The British Invasion", attracted 1.4 million viewers, making it the program's most-watched episode until the airing of the season three finale, "Do You Take Dexter Morgan?". Including digital video recorder (DVR) usage, season two was watched by an average of 2.4 million viewers on a weekly basis through 11 full weeks, outperforming season one by 21%.

In the season, the bodies of Dexter's victims are uncovered and an investigation is launched in Dexter's own department to find the killer, dubbed the "Bay Harbor Butcher". During this time, Debra struggles to recover after surviving the Ice Truck Killer's attempt to murder her, and Rita sends Dexter to Narcotics Anonymous meetings when he tells her that he has an "addiction". Sergeant James Doakes (Erik King) stalks Dexter, suspecting that he is connected with the Ice Truck Killer murders. Three new characters are introduced: Keith Carradine appears as Special Agent Frank Lundy, an FBI agent who heads the Bay Harbor Butcher investigation; JoBeth Williams as Rita's mother Gail; and Jaime Murray as Lila Tournay, Dexter's Narcotics Anonymous sponsor.

The season was praised by critics as "one of the best shows on TV this decade" by the Chicago Sun-Times, while Variety considers Hall's portrayal of the title character as a "towering achievement, one that eclipses the show's other shortcomings and rough patches"; the aggregate site Metacritic scored the season at 85 out of 100 based on 11 reviews.

== Plot ==
Taking place a month after the first-season finale, Dexter has been unable to kill anyone due to Sgt. James Doakes monitoring his activities and his sister Debra now living with him as she recovers from her traumatic experiences concerning Brian, the Ice Truck Killer. Dexter also realizes that he's having trouble killing even when he has the opportunity, due to feelings of guilt over killing his brother Brian.

Rita doubts Dexter's reliability and honesty after finding evidence that he set up her husband Paul to be returned to prison. After her husband dies in a prison fight, Rita confronts Dexter with her suspicions. He admits to setting up Paul but after claiming it was a spontaneous act, cannot explain why he happened to be carrying heroin (to plant on Paul). Rita incorrectly concludes that Dexter is, like Paul, a drug addict and that this explains his occasional absences and odd behavior. Dexter admits that he does indeed have an "addiction" (without specifying what that addiction is) and promises to seek help by joining Narcotics Anonymous. There, he meets Lila Tournay, who offers to be his sponsor. Sgt. James Doakes remains suspicious of Dexter's true motives, and constantly monitors Dexter's whereabouts.

Divers accidentally stumble upon Dexter's underwater burial ground, discovering the many bags containing the body parts of his victims. Realizing this dumping ground is the work of a serial killer, the media dubs these bodies the work of the "Bay Harbor Butcher." When it's revealed that each victim was a criminal and killer, some members of the public openly support the Bay Harbor Butcher; the case even inspires the creation of a knife-wielding comic book superhero "The Dark Defender." To oversee the investigation of the Butcher's crimes, an FBI special team is assigned to Miami, led by FBI Special Agent Lundy. Working with Miami Metro PD, Lundy brings in several of the Miami detectives, including Debra, to join his team. Over time, Debra and Lundy become romantically involved.

To ensure he's not identified as the Bay Harbor Butcher, Dexter finds a new dumping area with current that leads to the Atlantic Ocean. He also falsifies records, destroys evidence, and contaminates refrigerated remains to throw the investigators off his trail. Despite this, Lundy narrows down his suspect search to people in Miami with police training. Dexter puts his guilt over Brian behind him and returns to killing. Dexter later learns that his biological mother died because she was a criminal working as a confidential informant for Harry and had an affair with him. Dexter wonders if he was adopted because Harry felt guilty for his mother's death and he also learns that Harry didn't die of natural causes but purposefully overdosed to cause his own death. He doesn't understand why until later in the season.

Doakes becomes confident of Dexter's guilt and confronts him. Dexter then tricks Doakes into assaulting him in the police station, in front of other officers, leading others to side with Dexter that the Sergeant is out of control and causing him to be placed on suspension. Becoming more desperate, Doakes breaks into Dexter's apartment and finds the box of blood samples collected from his victims. However, the investigative team mistakenly concluded that Doakes is the Butcher after finding the box in his car, and Doakes goes into hiding while still tracking Dexter's movements. Lieutenant LaGuerta vouches for the innocence of her former partner, but Lundy refuses to consider her evidence after he learns that she didn't report previous contact with Doakes during the period he was a fugitive, because of their personal relationship.

Meanwhile, Dexter's relationship with Lila becomes closer as she shows him how to accept who he is. When Rita discovers Dexter spent an evening in a hotel with Lila, she breaks up with him and Dexter ends up sleeping with Lila for the first time. Dexter learns that Lila is a pyromaniac, at one point purposely setting fire to her apartment and feigning innocence to draw Dexter back to her. When she starts to follow him obsessively, he takes measures to distance himself from her, eventually forgoing their relationship. Realizing he is developing genuine connection to Rita and her children Astor and Cody, Dexter returns to them. Lila is furious and begins to track Dexter's movements, while also dating Detective Angel Batista. Dexter warns Batista that Lila is not to be trusted but he dismisses the concern. Later, Lila brings rape charges against Batista and tells Dexter she'll drop them if he returns to her. Debra investigates Lila and finds that her real name is Lila West, she is in the country illegally, and she has a criminal history, threatening her with deportation if she doesn't leave Miami.

Dexter tracks down the men responsible for his mother's death. One is dead, one is in jail and one, a drug dealer named Jimenez, is alive. After Jimenez very publicly tries and fails to kill him with a knife, Dexter tracks down the dealer's secluded cabin in the nearby swamps, where Dexter kills him. Dexter is called away before he can dispose of the body, but feels confident that the cabin is remote. When he finally goes back, he is unaware that Doakes is following him. Dexter subdues Doakes and locks him in a makeshift cell within the cabin, admitting to the sergeant that he is indeed the Bay Harbor Butcher. Dexter decides that he'll escape the law by convincing others that Doakes is the butcher. He kills a drug lord in the cabin in front of Doakes, shocking the police sergeant. Seeing Doakes' reaction to his actions reminds Dexter of something Harry said days before he died. While investigating something Doakes told him about Harry Dexter is informed by Captain Matthews that his father died by suicide. Dexter suddenly realizes the suicide was because he was ashamed of training Dexter to become a serial killer with a code. Horrified, Dexter tells Doakes, "I killed my father."

While Dexter considers that he must be held responsible for his crimes, Lila takes the GPS device from Dexter's car and uses it to locate the cabin. She finds Doakes, who explains that he is a prisoner of Dexter Morgan, the Bay Harbor Butcher, and needs help. Deciding she now understands Dexter and must help him, Lila leaves Doakes imprisoned and then lights the cabin's gas stove and opens a propane tank. She leaves and Doakes fails to escape, dying in the explosion. Finding Doakes' body and the other evidence Dexter left behind, the FBI concludes that Sgt. Doakes was indeed the Bay Harbor Butcher.

Lila admits her actions to Dexter and reaches out to him. Although he is glad not to be going to jail, Dexter did not intend to kill Doakes since he didn't fit the requirements of "Harry's Code." However, since Lila is a murderer, he plans to kill her since she is too dangerous to his personal life. He pretends that he wants to run away with Lila, but she realizes the truth and kidnaps Rita's children Astor and Cody. At the same time, Debra is on her way to leaving Miami with Lundy rather than letting their relationship end, but then misses the flight when she learns that the children are in danger and Dexter needs her. Lila lures Dexter to her apartment and then sets it on fire with him and the kids still inside. She leaves, sure that they will all die, but Dexter and the children escape. Debra arrives just as Dexter has gotten to safety and decides to remain in Miami after all.

The season concludes with Dexter tracking down Lila to Paris and killing her, avenging Doakes and getting revenge for trying to kill him, Astor, and Cody in a fire, thus ensuring that no one alive knows his secret life as a serial killer.

== Cast ==
=== Main cast ===
- Michael C. Hall as Dexter Morgan
- Julie Benz as Rita Bennett
- Jennifer Carpenter as Debra Morgan
- Erik King as James Doakes
- C. S. Lee as Vince Masuka
- Lauren Vélez as María LaGuerta
- David Zayas as Angel Batista
- James Remar as Harry Morgan

=== Special guest stars ===
- Keith Carradine as Frank Lundy
- Jaime Murray as Lila West aka Lila Tournay

=== Recurring cast ===
- Preston Bailey as Cody Bennett
- Christina Robinson as Astor Bennett
- Geoff Pierson as Tom Matthews
- Devon Graye, Dominic Janes and Maxwell Huckabee as young Dexter Morgan
- Dave Baez as Gabriel
- Judith Scott as Lt. Esme Pascal
- JoBeth Williams as Gail Brandon
- Tony Amendola as Santos Jimenez
- Sage Kirkpatrick as Laura Moser
- Christian Camargo as Brian Moser
- Margo Martindale as Camilla Figg
- Mark Pellegrino as Paul Bennett
- Tasia Sherel as Francis

=== Guest cast ===
- Matthew Willig as Little Chino
- Jonathan Banks as FBI Deputy Director Max Adams
- Glenn Plummer as Jimmy Sensio
- Don McManus as Roger Hicks
- John Marshall Jones as Curtis Barnes
- Silas Weir Mitchell as Ken Olson

== Crew ==
Series developer James Manos, Jr. left his first season role as executive producer. First season executive producers John Goldwyn, Sara Colleton and Clyde Phillips all returned for the second season. First season co-executive producer Daniel Cerone was promoted to executive producer for the second season. First season consulting producer Melissa Rosenberg took a staff position as co-executive producer for the second season. Scott Buck joined the crew as a co-executive producer and writer. Robert Lloyd Lewis returned as the on set producer.

First season Story Editor Timothy Schlattmann was promoted to Executive Story Editor for the second season and continued to write episodes. Lauren Gussis was promoted from staff writer to Story Editor and continued to write for the show. Chad Tomasoski, who had not worked on the show since the pilot episode, rejoined the crew as an associate producer.

== Episodes ==
| No. overall | No. in season | Title | Directed by | Written by | Original release date | U.S. viewers (millions) |
|---|---|---|---|---|---|---|
| 13 | 1 | "It's Alive!" | Tony Goldwyn | Daniel Cerone | September 30, 2007 | 1.01 |
A suspicious Doakes follows Dexter at all times, which makes it impossible for Dexter to kill. Thirty-eight days after his last kill, Dexter gains an opportunity, but finds himself unable to murder a blind voodoo priest called Jimmy. A member of the 29th St. Kings gang is killed by the leader Little Chino (Matthew Willig), in whom Dexter sees a chance to get his urges under control again. An emotionally unstable Debra returns to work in the Homicide Department. She tries to resume a normal lifestyle, but finds herself under scrutiny from the public. Paul tries to convince Rita that he was framed by Dexter, but she refuses to believe him in spite of the evidence presented to her. Scuba divers discover approximately 30 hefty bags of Dexter's mutilated victims' body parts on the ocean floor.
| 14 | 2 | "Waiting to Exhale" | Marcos Siega | Clyde Phillips | October 7, 2007 | 0.89 |
The Miami Metro Police Department, led by FBI Special Agent Frank Lundy, begins the hunt for the "Bay Harbor Butcher". Both Dexter and the police are hunting for Little Chino, and Dexter is determined to kill him properly given a second chance. Debra and Dexter struggle to overcome memories of the encounter with Brian that led to his death. After Paul's funeral, Rita confronts Dexter about his involvement in Paul's death, and he admits to having an addiction, which Rita infers to be to drugs. LaGuerta shows surprising support for new boss, Lieutenant Esmee Pascal (Judith Scott).
| 15 | 3 | "An Inconvenient Lie" | Tony Goldwyn | Melissa Rosenberg | October 14, 2007 | 0.95 |
Rita threatens to leave Dexter if he does not commit to a program to deal with his "drug addiction". He starts attending Narcotics Anonymous meetings, while still trying to evade Doakes' constant surveillance. At the meeting, Dexter meets a mysterious and flirtatious woman named Lila (Jaime Murray), who volunteers to be his sponsor. Doakes tracks Dexter at the meeting, but to Dexter's relief, Doakes displays understanding of the "addiction" and lets Dexter go. Later, he hunts down a new victim, Roger Hicks (Don McManus), a used-car salesman who murders beautiful brunettes. Lundy invites Debra to join the new task force investigating the Bay Harbor Butcher, and she soon discovers a pattern to the murders.
| 16 | 4 | "See-Through" | Nick Gomez | Scott Buck | October 21, 2007 | 0.80 |
Dexter begins to question Lila's suitability as his sponsor, and Rita encourages him to find a male one. Rita's visiting mother, Gail (JoBeth Williams), becomes sure that Dexter is hiding something from the family. Cody starts having nightmares about the Bay Harbor Butcher. When Vince announces that he has found a way to identify the marina where the Bay Harbor Butcher moors his boat, Dexter attempts to destroy some of the evidence. Doakes ends up in stand-off against one of his old special ops colleagues, after he murders his own wife. Debra starts dating Gabriel (Dave Baez), whom she met at the gym. LaGuerta returns to her job as lieutenant following the mental collapsing of Pascal, who suspects her fiancé of cheating; it turns out that he was cheating on her with none other than LaGuerta.
| 17 | 5 | "The Dark Defender" | Keith Gordon | Tim Schlattmann | October 28, 2007 | 0.63 |
Dexter discovers that one of the men who murdered his mother in front of him as a boy is still alive. He dreams that a comic-book hero based on the Bay Harbor Butcher saves his mother, and is encouraged by Lila to seek closure by confronting his mother's killer, Santos Jimenez (Tony Amendola). Doakes and LaGuerta investigate a homicide in a comic-book store, and reminisce about their days as partners. Rita's mother warns Dexter to leave Rita and her children alone. Debra begins to lose faith in her relationship with Gabriel, suspecting that he is taking advantage of her.
| 18 | 6 | "Dex, Lies, and Videotape" | Nick Gomez | Lauren Gussis | November 4, 2007 | 0.85 |
After learning that he was filmed while cleaning his boat at the marina, Dexter becomes desperate and tries to delete the videofile, which he eventually manages to do before computer upgrades enable its viewing by his colleagues. A mock killer mimics, and claims to be inspired by, the Bay Harbor Butcher, and unless the police find him, the FBI may take over the case completely. Following a conversation with Debra, Doakes becomes suspicious that Dexter isn't an addict like he previously thought, and becomes more determined to find out his secret. After learning about his mother's secret relationship with his foster father, Dexter questions Harry's motives about his own adoption. At Rita's mother suggestion, Dexter brings Lila to dinner, and when Rita finds out that Lila accompanied Dexter on his road trip, Rita breaks up with him. Dexter and Lila leave together and have sex later.
| 19 | 7 | "That Night, A Forest Grew" | Jeremy Podeswa | Daniel Cerone | November 11, 2007 | 0.84 |
A written manifesto sent by the Bay Harbor Butcher to a local newspaper sends Lundy's special task force into chaos. Doakes almost discovers the truth about Dexter's past, which forces Dexter to devise a plan to get him suspended from the police force. During a romantic dinner with Dexter, Lila learns that Dexter plans to attend one of Cody's school events where he will see Rita, and becomes jealous. Rita stands up to her mother and compels her to move out of the house. Debra breaks up with Gabriel and decides to pursue a relationship with Lundy, not knowing if her feelings are reciprocated.
| 20 | 8 | "Morning Comes" | Keith Gordon | Scott Buck | November 18, 2007 | 1.23 |
A desperate Lila sets her loft on fire in an effort to sustain her relationship with Dexter, but Dexter realizes that Lila is lying when she claims it was an accident. Jimenez visits Dexter and the suspicious Doakes breaks into Dexter's apartment and finds the hidden collection of blood slides. Lundy re-examines all of the department's old cases when he suspects that the Bay Harbor Butcher has a history in law enforcement. Rita tells Dexter that he is no longer welcome to visit her house or her children.
| 21 | 9 | "Resistance Is Futile" | Marcos Siega | Melissa Rosenberg | November 25, 2007 | 1.03 |
Under constant surveillance by federal agents, Dexter is unable to dispose of his latest victim's remains. He apologizes to Rita, admitting that his affair with Lila was a mistake, but she is still hesitant to forgive him, as Lila retaliates by pursuing Angel. After finding Dexter's collection of blood slides, Doakes seeks the advice of an old friend in Haiti to analyze them. The department begins to suspect Doakes' involvement in the Bay Harbor Butcher case, but cannot find him for questions. Debra and Lundy spend the night together and contemplate making their relationship public.
| 22 | 10 | "There's Something About Harry" | Steve Shill | Scott Reynolds | December 2, 2007 | 1.08 |
After their latest confrontation, Dexter imprisons Doakes in a cabin hidden in the Florida Everglades, but is unsure of what to do next. Doakes reveals information that leads Dexter to a surprising discovery about his foster father's death. The FBI continues the search for Doakes, while LaGuerta tries to prove his innocence. As the investigation comes to a close, Debra realizes that Lundy will leave Miami at the end of the investigation. She confronts him about the future of their relationship. Rita and Dexter reconcile and visit the beach together, while Lila plans to frame Angel for raping her.
| 23 | 11 | "Left Turn Ahead" | Marcos Siega | Scott Buck & Tim Schlattmann | December 9, 2007 | 0.89 |
Dexter contemplates admitting to the Bay Harbor Butcher killings. Doakes escapes from his cell but runs afoul of two drug smugglers. The FBI is displeased with the lack of progress in the Bay Harbor Butcher case and assigns a deputy director to take over Lundy's role in the investigation. Angel is arrested for the sexual assault of Lila, who offers to drop the charges if Dexter will resume their relationship. Debra investigates Lila's past and discovers that she is an illegal immigrant. Meanwhile, using Dexter's global positioning system, Lila discovers the cabin in the swamp, where Doakes is being held.
| 24 | 12 | "The British Invasion" | Steve Shill | Story by : Daniel Cerone & Melissa Rosenberg; Teleplay by : Daniel Cerone | December 16, 2007 | 1.02 |
Lila finds Doakes imprisoned in the cabin, and realizes that Dexter is the Bay Harbor Butcher. She ignores his pleas for help, and kills Doakes by setting the cabin on fire. Doakes is found dead, and because the evidence of the Bay Harbor Butcher killings indicates him as the criminal, the case is closed. Debra and Lundy try to resolve their relationship problems and Dexter reconciles with Rita. When Lila threatens Rita's children, Dexter realizes that he needs to find a solution to Lila's obsession with him. After Lila attempts to kill him, Dexter follows her to Paris and kills her.
