= Left Turn Ahead =

- Dexter episode
- Episode no.: Season 2 Episode 11
- Directed by: Marcos Siega
- Written by: Scott Buck; Tim Schlattmann
- Cinematography by: Romeo Tirone
- Editing by: Chris Figler
- Original release date: December 9, 2007
- Running time: 51 minutes

Guest appearances
- Geoff Pierson as Thomas Matthews; Peter Macon as Leones; Jonathan Banks as Max Adams; Tony Colitti as Dr. Hill; Jaime Murray as Lila West; Keith Carradine as Frank Lundy

Episode chronology
← Previous "There's Something About Harry"	Next → "The British Invasion"
- Dexter season 2

"Left Turn Ahead" is the eleventh episode of the second season and twenty-third overall episode of the American television drama series Dexter, which first aired on December 9, 2007 on Showtime in the United States. The episode was written by co-executive producer Scott Buck and Tim Schlattmann, and was directed by Marcos Siega.

Set in Miami, the series centers on Dexter Morgan, a forensic technician specializing in bloodstain pattern analysis for the fictional Miami Metro Police Department, who leads a secret parallel life as a vigilante serial killer, hunting down murderers who have not been adequately punished by the justice system due to corruption or legal technicalities. In the episode, Dexter considers new options while having to deal with Doakes, and Debra discovers Lila's real identity.

According to Nielsen Media Research, the episode was seen by an estimated 0.89 million household viewers and gained a 0.4/1 ratings share among adults aged 18–49. The episode received critical acclaim, who praised Dexter's character development, tension and cliffhanger.

== Plot ==
As Dexter (Michael C. Hall) feels guilt over his role in Harry's suicide, Doakes (Erik King) tries to get him to surrender to authorities. He is called away when Lila (Jaime Murray) arrives at the hospital, claiming she was raped by Angel (David Zayas). She is intent on getting him charged but promises to drop the charges if Dexter resumes their relationship.

Due to the little progress on the case, the FBI assigns Deputy Director Max Adams (Jonathan Banks) to take over Lundy (Keith Carradine). Adams reports that the tools have been recovered. They also retrieved footage video of Doakes at a gas station.

Doakes kicks the fence around the cage at the cabin and finally escapes. On his way out, he finds two men approaching with a boat. When he identifies himself as a police officer, they knock him unconscious and take him to the cabin. As Dexter returns, he sees the men retrieving the cocaine from the cabin while holding Doakes at gunpoint. Working together, they kill the dealers, although Dexter forces Doakes to return to the cage.

Feeling the effects of his actions on others, Dexter confides to Doakes that he will turn himself into the authorities. He then leaves, planning to leave his matters in order before releasing Doakes. He visits Lila, informing her they will not be back and that he plans to end his career. Debra (Jennifer Carpenter) and Lundy question their future together, as Lundy will have to leave Miami when the case is closed. While trying to help prove Angel's innocence, Debra checks Lila's records, finding them empty. She and Masuka (C. S. Lee) analyze a microwave she used to take her fingerprints to find her real identity.

In Port-au-Prince, LaGuerta visits Leones (Peter Macon) and discovers that he wants to analyze the blood slides. As Doakes' alibi does not corroborate with some of the Butcher's murders, Lundy accepts to hear her story. Nevertheless, Adams is not interested in hearing Leones' testimony, especially as they have received a tip over Doakes' location. Dexter prepares a will and leaves a living trust to Debra. He then leaves to take a ride in his boat with Rita (Julie Benz) and the kids. During this, Lila breaks into his car and checks his GPS to find out about his recent visits. Debra finds that Lila's real name is Lila West, and her visa expired two years ago. Debra visits her and warns her to leave. That night, Dexter has dinner with Debra, planning to tell her his secret, but he cannot bring himself to do it. Their dinner is interrupted when Doakes' car is found, and Dexter worries they will find him caged at the cabin.

== Production ==
=== Development ===
The episode was written by co-executive producer Scott Buck and Tim Schlattmann, and was directed by Marcos Siega. This was Buck's third writing credit, Schlattmann's fourth writing credit, and Siega's third directing credit.

== Reception ==
=== Viewers ===
In its original American broadcast, "Left Turn Ahead" was seen by an estimated 0.89 million household viewers with a 0.4/1 in the 18–49 demographics. This means that 0.4 percent of all households with televisions watched the episode, while 1 percent of all of those watching television at the time of the broadcast watched it. This was a 18% decrease in viewership from the previous episode, which was watched by an estimated 1.08 million household viewers with a 0.5/1 in the 18–49 demographics.

=== Critical reviews ===
"Left Turn Ahead" received critical acclaim. Eric Goldman of IGN gave the episode an "amazing" 9 out of 10, and wrote, "You know a show is doing a great job when it has you thinking that maybe they should end it now, simply because it seems so impossible to top what is currently happening. Such is the case with Dexter, where the penultimate episode of the season truly felt like the penultimate episode of the entire series. That's not actually the case, as Showtime will be bringing the show back for a third season, but dramatically it worked very well at feeling like things were completely wrapping up."

Scott Tobias of The A.V. Club gave the episode a "B+" grade and wrote, "After the major character revelations last week, “Left Turn Ahead” does a lot of table-setting for next week's big finale, but the plotting is mostly strong (as it's been all season, really) and not entirely at the expense of character, either."

Alan Sepinwall wrote, "Doakes has been a one-note character at times over the years, but Erik King has done some very nice work these last couple of weeks as Doakes has tried to talk his way out of this deathtrap." Paula Paige of TV Guide wrote, "The suspense for the finale is killing me although the teaser for next week seemed to basically show the entire episode. But I can't wait to find out what cliff-hangers will be in store for us."

Keith McDuffee of TV Squad wrote, "Through this whole sequence of Dexter and Doakes being in the cage, I had the same thought all along, that Dexter framing Doakes simply wouldn't work. The long months of Doakes pointing a finger at Dexter would only serve as a huge spotlight on Dexter's life, as if Doakes would stop at any moment at uncovering the truth to everyone." Television Without Pity gave the episode a "B+" grade.

Jennifer Carpenter submitted this episode for consideration for Outstanding Supporting Actress in a Drama Series at the 60th Primetime Emmy Awards.
