= See-Through =

- Dexter episode
- Dexter Morgan (Michael C. Hall) shows Lila West (Jaime Murray) the victims of the Bay Harbor Butcher.
- Episode no.: Season 2 Episode 4
- Directed by: Nick Gomez
- Written by: Scott Buck
- Cinematography by: Romeo Tirone
- Editing by: Stewart Schill
- Original release date: October 21, 2007
- Running time: 53 minutes

Guest appearances
- Geoff Pierson as Thomas Matthews; JoBeth Williams as Gail Brandon; Judith Scott as Esmée Pascal; Dominic Janes as Young Dexter; John Marshall Jones as Curtis Barnes; Bertila Damas as Sota's Widow; Albie Selznick as Psychiatrist; Jaime Murray as Lila Tourney; Keith Carradine as Frank Lundy

Episode chronology
← Previous "An Inconvenient Lie"	Next → "The Dark Defender"
- Dexter season 2

"See-Through" is the fourth episode of the second season and sixteenth overall episode of the American television drama series Dexter, which first aired on October 21, 2007 on Showtime in the United States. The episode was written by co-executive producer Scott Buck and was directed by Nick Gomez.

Set in Miami, the series centers on Dexter Morgan, a forensic technician specializing in bloodstain pattern analysis for the fictional Miami Metro Police Department, who leads a secret parallel life as a vigilante serial killer, hunting down murderers who have not been adequately punished by the justice system due to corruption or legal technicalities. In the episode, Dexter tries to find the pattern that the FBI has discovered in the Bay Harbor Butcher case, while also dealing with his new sponsor.

According to Nielsen Media Research, the episode was seen by an estimated 0.80 million household viewers and gained a 0.4/1 ratings share among adults aged 18–49. The episode received mostly positive reviews from critics, who praised the exploration of Dexter's actions.

== Plot ==
Dexter (Michael C. Hall) grows worried when the FBI finds a pattern in the Bay Harbor Butcher murders, as the identified victims had criminal records involving murder. Matthews (Geoff Pierson) decides to announce the discovery in an attempt to calm the citizens, upsetting Lundy (Keith Carradine). Masuka (C. S. Lee) also discovers a new lead, but Dexter is unable to overhear.

Dexter meets with Lila (Jaime Murray) as his new sponsor, although he is confused over her artwork. Nevertheless, he hopes that Lila can help him with his dark tendencies despite claiming he is not a drug addict. Dexter also accompanies Rita (Julie Benz) when her estranged mother Gail, (JoBeth Williams), comes to visit after learning of Paul's death. While Gail expresses admiration for the Bay Harbor Butcher, she feels Dexter might be hiding something. Per Lundy's advice, Debra (Jennifer Carpenter) resumes dating and invites a gym employee, Gabriel (Dave Baez), to the apartment for sex. However, Debra still feels haunted by her relationship with the Ice Truck Killer. While talking with Dexter, she reveals that Masuka found an algae pattern in the murders, which could pinpoint the location where the Bay Harbor Butcher has the boat.

Miami Metro also investigates a woman's murder. Believing that the killer might be a Special Operations agent, Doakes (Erik King) decides to check on Curtis Barnes (John Marshall Jones), the woman's widower. Curtis admits to the murder, and Doakes is forced to kill him when he draws his weapon. At the department, Pascal (Judith Scott) asks Masuka to check her fiancé's shirt, believing it might have the scent of a woman. When Masuka fails to discover anything, Pascal has a mental breakdown, and LaGuerta (Lauren Vélez) comforts her. Seeing her behavior, Matthews appoints LaGuerta as Lieutenant again. She is later seen with her fiancé, Bertrand, and she breaks off their affair.

When Rita asks him to get a new sponsor, Dexter tells Lila he will find a new one. Lila is not content with his decision and visits him at the station to confront him. Dexter decides to show her the Bay Harbor Butcher's victims to scare her off, but he is taken aback when Lila expresses admiration for the killer. As she leaves, she surprises him by kissing him, and Dexter decides to continue with her as his sponsor. That night, he breaks into the morgue and destroys the AC unit, melting the corpses and destroying evidence against him. However, Masuka reveals that the algae were not in the bodies; they were found in the rocks as the killer used them to drop the bodies, and that a laboratory is already analyzing it to find the location of the boat, once again worrying Dexter.

== Production ==
=== Development ===
The episode was written by co-executive producer Scott Buck and was directed by Nick Gomez. This was Buck's first writing credit, and Gomez's first directing credit.

== Reception ==
=== Viewers ===
In its original American broadcast, "See-Through" was seen by an estimated 0.80 million household viewers with a 0.4/1 in the 18–49 demographics. This means that 0.4 percent of all households with televisions watched the episode, while 1 percent of all of those watching television at the time of the broadcast watched it. This was a 16% decrease in viewership from the previous episode, which was watched by an estimated 0.95 million household viewers.

=== Critical reviews ===
"See-Through" received mostly positive reviews from critics. Eric Goldman of IGN gave the episode a "great" 8.6 out of 10, and wrote, "The episode did a very good job of showing more of the well-rounded portrayal of Lundy, who seems like a confident, skilled and warm guy. His scenes with Deb, as he encouraged her to date and opened up a bit about his own past romantic life were sweet."

Scott Tobias of The A.V. Club gave the episode an "B+" grade and wrote, "After the impressive character work in last week's episode, “See-Through” downshifts into more of a storyline-juggler, dividing its time more equally to other characters and subplots that have taken a backseat and dealing with revelations in the BHB investigation. The question of whether Dexter would sabotage the investigation in order to save his own ass gets an answer: Hell to the yes."

Alan Sepinwall wrote, "I'm assuming in the end he's going to escape Lundy's task force somehow, someway, and I'm fine with that but if I'm feeling itchy in the fourth episode of the season (and one in which Dexter really doesn't accomplish much of anything with his dumpster/refrigeration unit stunt), I worry how played out the concept might seem by the end of the year." Paula Paige of TV Guide wrote, "Jumpin’ Jehosephat, that was a good Dexter! We had intrique and murder and sex and scandal. Delicious."

Keith McDuffee of TV Squad wrote, "Dexter's making himself look more and more guilty as the case against him builds, even though his colleagues don't suspect a thing. It's when things start pointing in his direction that these moments will stand out." Television Without Pity gave the episode a "B" grade.
