= That Night, A Forest Grew =

- Dexter episode
- The aftermatch of James Doakes (Erik King) attacking Dexter Morgan (Michael C. Hall)
- Episode no.: Season 2 Episode 7
- Directed by: Jeremy Podeswa
- Written by: Daniel Cerone
- Cinematography by: Romeo Tirone
- Editing by: Stewart Schill
- Original release date: November 11, 2007
- Running time: 55 minutes

Guest appearances
- JoBeth Williams as Gail Brandon; Margo Martindale as Camilla Figg; Dale Midkiff as Craig Wilson; S.A. Griffin as Don of Miami Tribune; Jaime Murray as Lila Tourney; Keith Carradine as Frank Lundy

Episode chronology
| ← Previous "Dex, Lies, and Videotape" | Next → "Morning Comes" |
- Dexter season 2

"That Night, A Forest Grew" is the seventh episode of the second season and nineteenth overall episode of the American television drama series Dexter, which first aired on November 11, 2007 on Showtime in the United States. The episode was written by executive producer Daniel Cerone and was directed by Jeremy Podeswa.

Set in Miami, the series centers on Dexter Morgan, a forensic technician specializing in bloodstain pattern analysis for the fictional Miami Metro Police Department, who leads a secret parallel life as a vigilante serial killer, hunting down murderers who have not been adequately punished by the justice system due to corruption or legal technicalities. In the episode, Dexter sends a manifesto to confuse the police department, while also trying to prevent Doakes from investigating further.

According to Nielsen Media Research, the episode was seen by an estimated 0.84 million household viewers and gained a 0.4/1 ratings share among adults aged 18–49. The episode received critical acclaim, who praised the scenes between Dexter and Doakes, as well as curiosity over Lila's intentions.

== Plot ==
Under the Bay Harbor Butcher name, Dexter (Michael C. Hall) sends a manifesto to a newspaper, hoping he can distract the police by copy-pasting different manifestos from the Internet. He reveals three names not disclosed to the media, and builds different "explanations" behind his motives, leading to confusion over what he truly wants.

Doakes (Erik King) decides to investigate the Shipping Yard case, but Camilla (Margo Martindale) refuses to give him the files. To ruin his reputation, Dexter sabotages Doakes by making him intimidate an innocent suspect. Upon discovering he was set up, Doakes confronts Dexter. Dexter provokes Doakes into assaulting him in front of everyone, ruining Doakes's reputation. Tired, LaGuerta (Lauren Vélez) suspends Doakes and opens an investigation against him.

Meanwhile, Debra (Jennifer Carpenter) decides to break up with Gabriel (Dave Baez) but says it is not his fault. While lunching with Lundy (Keith Carradine), Debra kisses him. During a briefing over the Butcher's case, Lundy deduces that the killer wants to confuse them and that he might be involved in the police.

Dexter continues his relationship with Lila (Jaime Murray), although Debra dislikes her personality. Cody (Preston Bailey) calls Dexter and asks him to assist with a school project presentation the following day. While Gail (JoBeth Williams) refuses to get Dexter involved again, Rita (Julie Benz) is not content with her grounding her children for wanting to meet him. Rita also states that Gail lied about her decision to move into the house; she did not quit her job. She was fired instead. Fed up with her controlling nature, Rita kicks her out of the house. Dexter attends Cody's presentation the following day but is forced to leave shortly after it ends when Lila calls him for help when her apartment is burned down. Unbeknownst to Dexter, Lila set the fire off herself.

== Production ==
=== Development ===
The episode was written by executive producer Daniel Cerone and was directed by Jeremy Podeswa. This was Cerone's fifth writing credit, and Podeswa's first directing credit.

== Reception ==
=== Viewers ===
In its original American broadcast, "That Night, A Forest Grew" was seen by an estimated 0.84 million household viewers with a 0.4/1 in the 18–49 demographics. This means that 0.4 percent of all households with televisions watched the episode, while 1 percent of all of those watching television at the time of the broadcast watched it. This was a slight decrease in viewership from the previous episode, which was watched by an estimated 0.85 million household viewers with a 0.5 in the 18–49 demographics.

=== Critical reviews ===
"That Night, A Forest Grew" received critical acclaim. Eric Goldman of IGN gave the episode an "amazing" 9.3 out of 10, and wrote, "This was a very notable episode of Dexter, showing our "hero" at his most diabolical and calculated. Usually we see Dexter do what is necessary to protect himself and go through his homicidal business without interruption. But with two different forces - Doakes and Lundy - both closing in on him, the Bay Harbor Butcher got pro-active in new ways. As always, it's hard to know if we should be rooting for this ruthlessness, or noting that it seems to be a sign of a perhaps more evil incarnation of Dexter, but that's part of what makes this show so intriguing."

Scott Tobias of The A.V. Club gave the episode an "B+" grade and wrote, "I don't know, beyond Deb's divided loyalties to her brother and the man who's methodically tracking him down, but for now, I'm really not that interested in their coupling at all. It seems forced and distracting. Hate to end on a bum note, though. This was mostly a very strong hour."

Alan Sepinwall wrote, "It's a very strong episode. Many interesting things happen plotwise, as Dexter gets a little too cute in trying to manipulate Lundy and achieves the right amount of cuteness in discrediting and banishing Doakes (though it'll still come back to bite him, I’m sure)." Paula Paige of TV Guide wrote, "I must say they are pulling out all the stops in the second season of Dexter. This is the antithesis of the sophomore slump. If anything, Dexter has gotten even better this time around."

Keith McDuffee of TV Squad wrote, "Before tonight's episode I would have guessed that Lila could possibly be used as a scapegoat for Dexter, though with the whole "law enforcement" angle, there's just no way that can happen unless she's a former cop and we don't know it." Television Without Pity gave the episode a "B+" grade.
