= British Invasion (disambiguation) =

The British Invasion was a cultural phenomenon of the mid-1960s, when rock and pop music acts from the United Kingdom and other aspects of British culture became popular in the United States.

British Invasion may also refer to:

== Entertainment ==
- Second British Invasion, a similar influx into the United States in the 1980s, based on MTV airplay of British music
- British soul invasion (or Third British Invasion), a musical movement of the 2000s and 2010s, centered on British R&B and soul artists
- UK underground (or Fourth British Invasion), a musical movement of the 2020s, centered on British jerk and cloud rappers
- British Invasion (comics), an influx of British comics writers onto American comic books
- The British Invasion (professional wrestling), a professional wrestling tag team who performed in Total Nonstop Action Wrestling
- "The British Invasion" (Dexter), an episode of the drama series Dexter
- British Invasion (car show), an annual British automobile show in Stowe, Vermont
- America's Next Top Model: British Invasion, an alternative name of America's Next Top Model (cycle 18)
- British Invasion, a live DVD by American glam metal band Steel Panther

== Sport ==
- 1961 Indianapolis 500, known as the "British Invasion" as Jack Brabham brought the first competitive rear-engined car to the Indianapolis 500

== Military history ==
- Invasions of the British Isles, an overview of historical invasions of the British Isles from c. 4000 BC to 1797
- British invasions of the River Plate, military attacks by British forces on Buenos Aires and the Río de la Plata area between 1806 and 1807
- War of 1812, includes both a British invasion of the United States and a United States invasion of British Canada
- British invasion of Iceland during World War II

== See also ==
- List of wars involving the United Kingdom
