= There's Something About Harry =

- Dexter episode
- Episode no.: Season 2 Episode 10
- Directed by: Steve Shill
- Written by: Scott Reynolds
- Cinematography by: Romeo Tirone
- Editing by: Stewart Schill
- Original release date: December 2, 2007
- Running time: 55 minutes

Guest appearances
- Geoff Pierson as Thomas Matthews; Jaime Murray as Lila West; Keith Carradine as Frank Lundy

Episode chronology
← Previous "Resistance Is Futile"	Next → "Left Turn Ahead"
- Dexter season 2

"There's Something About Harry" is the tenth episode of the second season and twenty-second overall episode of the American television drama series Dexter, which first aired on December 2, 2007 on Showtime in the United States. The episode was written by Scott Reynolds and was directed by Steve Shill.

Set in Miami, the series centers on Dexter Morgan, a forensic technician specializing in bloodstain pattern analysis for the fictional Miami Metro Police Department, who leads a secret parallel life as a vigilante serial killer, hunting down murderers who have not been adequately punished by the justice system due to corruption or legal technicalities. In the episode, Dexter keeps Doakes locked in a cage, while also discovering that Harry hid something from him.

According to Nielsen Media Research, the episode was seen by an estimated 1.08 million household viewers and gained a 0.5/1 ratings share among adults aged 18–49. The episode received critical acclaim, with critics praising the performances and revelations in the episode. For the episode, Michael C. Hall received a nomination for Outstanding Lead Actor in a Drama Series at the 60th Primetime Emmy Awards

== Plot ==
At the cabin, Dexter (Michael C. Hall) treats his gunshot wound. He then talks with the captive Doakes (Erik King), claiming they are both killers by nature. Doakes makes it clear they are nothing alike. He then leaves back for his house, leaving Doakes alone at the cabin. He convinces Lundy (Keith Carradine) to remove his protective detail, sure that Doakes will not risk his cover for him.

Debra (Jennifer Carpenter) talks to LaGuerta (Lauren Vélez) to scold her for talking with Doakes and not reporting it to the police. LaGuerta states that she believes in his innocence and will risk her career if it must be done. Dexter reports more victims through the blood slides, linking them to Doakes as the Bay Harbor Butcher. Subsequently, he returns to the cabin and sedates Doakes, determining that he must kill him. As Doakes passes out, he brings up that he knows something about Harry (James Remar), so Dexter delays killing him. Instead, he uses Doakes' fingerprints in his tools and drops them at a river, where they will be discovered and redirected to Doakes. In flashbacks, Harry arrests Juan Ryness, a pimp who murdered a prostitute. When Ryness is released due to a technicality, Harry loses his temper. When Dexter approaches him, Harry states he did the right thing in training him for this moment.

Regaining consciousness, Doakes refuses to answer Dexter's questions about Harry, claiming he knows something no one else does. Instead, Dexter visits Matthews (Geoff Pierson) to learn about it. Matthews reveals that Harry did not die of heart disease; it was actually suicide, believed to be due to the amount of criminals allowed to walk free. Before his death, he asked Matthews to take care of Dexter and Debra, and he hid his death from them. Angel (David Zayas) continues seeing Lila (Jaime Murray), and they have sex at her house. Unaware to Angel, Lila takes rohypnol, intending to frame him for rape.

Jimenez's phone constantly rings, as his partner Jose Garza wants to meet over a cocaine delivery. Dexter tricks Garza into a bar and captures him, incapacitating him before taking him to the cabin. Despite Doakes' pleas to stop, Dexter murders Garza, shocking him. As Dexter chops the body, Doakes says, "Stay away from me." This saying causes Dexter to remember one of his last encounters with Harry; three days before his death, Harry walked in when a young Dexter killed and chopped Ryness. Dexter was content with his actions, but Harry was disturbed. Back in the present, Dexter is shocked to realize that Harry committed suicide because of him, and he is unable to deal with it.

== Production ==
=== Development ===
The episode was written by Scott Reynolds and was directed by Steve Shill. This was Reynolds' first writing credit, and Shill's second directing credit.

== Reception ==
=== Viewers ===
In its original American broadcast, "There's Something About Harry" was seen by an estimated 1.08 million household viewers with a 0.5/1 in the 18–49 demographics. This means that 0.5 percent of all households with televisions watched the episode, while 1 percent of all of those watching television at the time of the broadcast watched it. This was a slight increase in viewership from the previous episode, which was watched by an estimated 1.03 million household viewers with a 0.5 in the 18–49 demographics.

=== Critical reviews ===
"There's Something About Harry" received critical acclaim. Eric Goldman of IGN gave the episode a "great" 8.5 out of 10, and wrote, "When you raise the stakes as much as last week's Dexter did, it's difficult maintaining momentum. So it was with the latest episode, which calmed down a bit (but only a bit), but clearly was laying groundwork for the huge confrontations coming in the final two episodes."

Scott Tobias of The A.V. Club gave the episode an "A" grade and wrote, "I was excited when I saw the title of the episode, “There's Something About Harry,” because it promised to add a new wrinkle to Dexter's already busy goings-on as we approach the end of the season. But the twist about Harry's suicide hit like the proverbial ton of bricks, one of those delicious turns that's both out of the blue and perfectly in keeping with the spirit of the show. What's more, it's all about character. A lesser show would be feeding the beast at this juncture, i.e. tying things up as a serialized thriller is supposed to do and hopefully springing a few surprises along the way. But Dexter has never been some run-of-the-mill policier, and the writers have stepped up their game this season."

Alan Sepinwall wrote, "I enjoyed the cat and mouse game in the cabin between Dexter and Doakes, and how being exposed to the true face of Dexter - even hidden behind opaque plastic sheeting - shattered Doakes. If a hard man with blood on his hands like Doakes would react that way, how badly would Deb and Rita and the kids be hurt by discovering Dexter's true face? And how good a job do the writers do of making me want to root for the serial killer to get away with it, even if it means sacrificing an honest cop in the process?" Paula Paige of TV Guide wrote, "It was much better the second time around. The subtly of the acting drives me wild."

Keith McDuffee of TV Squad wrote, "I could tell early on in this season that Harry just had to play a bigger part in the show... eventually. Wouldn't you know it, it took only about a five-minute scene to spell everything out to Dexter as one big epiphany. It's interesting that it takes current-day observances for Dexter to understand things that happened in the past." Television Without Pity gave the episode an "A" grade.

Michael C. Hall submitted this episode to support his nomination for Outstanding Lead Actor in a Drama Series at the 60th Primetime Emmy Awards. He would lose to Bryan Cranston for Breaking Bad.
