= An Inconvenient Lie =

- Dexter episode
- James Doakes (Erik King) accosts Dexter Morgan (Michael C. Hall)
- Episode no.: Season 2 Episode 3
- Directed by: Tony Goldwyn
- Written by: Melissa Rosenberg
- Cinematography by: Romeo Tirone
- Editing by: Louis Cioffi
- Original release date: October 14, 2007
- Running time: 52 minutes

Guest appearances
- Geoff Pierson as Thomas Matthews; Judith Scott as Esmée Pascal; Don McManus as Roger Hicks; Jaime Murray as Lila Tourney; Keith Carradine as Frank Lundy

Episode chronology
← Previous "Waiting to Exhale"	Next → "See-Through"
- Dexter season 2

"An Inconvenient Lie" is the third episode of the second season and fifteenth overall episode of the American television drama series Dexter, which first aired on October 14, 2007 on Showtime in the United States. The episode was written by co-executive producer Melissa Rosenberg and was directed by Tony Goldwyn.

Set in Miami, the series centers on Dexter Morgan, a forensic technician specializing in bloodstain pattern analysis for the fictional Miami Metro Police Department, who leads a secret parallel life as a vigilante serial killer, hunting down murderers who have not been adequately punished by the justice system due to corruption or legal technicalities. In the episode, Dexter begins attending NA meetings while pursuing a new victim, while the FBI and police start working on the Bay Harbor Butcher case.

According to Nielsen Media Research, the episode was seen by an estimated 0.95 million household viewers. The episode received highly positive reviews from critics, with particular praise towards the second half of the episode and its exploration within Dexter's character.

== Plot ==
Dexter (Michael C. Hall) begins attending Narcotics Anonymous meetings, pretending he is an addict to cover up himself. Dexter leaves early, and Rita (Julie Benz) is upset that he is not taking it seriously. Dexter agrees to return when Rita threatens to break up their relationship.

Lundy (Keith Carradine) forms his task force, which includes Debra (Jennifer Carpenter), Angel (David Zayas), and Masuka (C. S. Lee). During this, Dexter follows a new victim, Roger Hicks (Don McManus), a car salesman that may have been involved in previous murders. He follows him to his dealership and is tricked by Hicks into buying a new SUV. During another visit, Dexter checks his office and finds a pattern: his victims are brunettes. He later goes to another NA meeting, where he gives a statement under the name Bob. A woman, Lila (Jaime Murray), takes an interest in him, aware that Dexter is lying about his name and story. When Dexter claims he does not see the point of the NA meetings, Rita decides to take a break from him, preventing him from visiting her and the children.

Debra is disturbed by the interviews she must take, and repeatedly asks Lundy to take her off the case. Lundy defends his decision, as he feels Debra can be helpful through her encounters with the Ice Truck Killer. Lundy later runs into Dexter at the morgue, and they exchange a conversation about the motives behind the Bay Harbor Butcher. To get Doakes (Erik King) out of the picture, Dexter stabs Doakes' car's flat tire, allowing him to finally reach Hicks. He sedates him and brings him to his kill table, where he begins opening up about the role of Rita in his life. Hicks insults Rita, prompting an angry Dexter to kill him.

At the department, Debra discovers a pattern when two victims are revealed to have criminal records and contacts Lundy about it. Dexter returns to NA, revealing his name and opening up about the "Dark Passenger" affecting him inside. Doakes witnesses the speech, believing that this is Dexter's secret. He tells him to clean up, revealing he knows he is responsible for his flat tire. Dexter visits Rita to admit he was wrong, and Rita accepts to welcome him back. She takes him to one of the NA meetings but feels worried when she sees Dexter greet Lila, who is now his sponsor.

== Production ==
=== Development ===
The episode was written by co-executive producer Melissa Rosenberg and was directed by Tony Goldwyn. This was Rosenberg's fourth writing credit, and Goldwyn's fourth directing credit.

== Reception ==
=== Viewers ===
In its original American broadcast, "An Incovenient Lie" was seen by an estimated 0.95 million household viewers. This was a slight increase in viewership from the previous episode, which was watched by an estimated 0.89 million household viewers with a 0.4/1 in the 18–49 demographics.

=== Critical reviews ===
"An Incovenient Lie" received highly positive reviews from critics. Eric Goldman of IGN gave the episode a "great" 8.5 out of 10, and wrote, "The episode really gets going in the second half, as both Deb and Dexter have some important interactions with Lundy, who is getting increasingly interesting. Doakes' obsession with Dexter also takes a fun turn, and it all leads to a very intriguing bit of self-realization for our serial killer hero."

Scott Tobias of The A.V. Club gave the episode an "A–" grade and wrote, "As Dexter's grisly handiwork continues to surface from the ocean floor, his sense of self is starting to emerge as well, and it's a destabilizing development for him. In “An Inconvenient Lie,” the best episode of the season so far, he continues to make remarkable progress in understanding and acknowledging that maybe he really does care about the people close to him."

Alan Sepinwall wrote, "The trend in most series with morally complex protagonists is to slowly sand off their edges over time (even The Shield did that for a while with Mackey), and I admire team Dexter in their willingness to embrace everything that's wrong about their main character." Paula Paige of TV Guide wrote, "This being the third installment of Season 2 of Dexter and we've hit a gold mine. This ep was funny, clever and totally satisfying, like steak after a good kill."

Keith McDuffee of TV Squad wrote, "As if the last two episodes weren't enough to make you realize how great this season's going to play out, Dexter's new foray into "addicts" anonymous is a brilliant storyline. And that it got Doakes off his tail is even better. Could a 12-step program really put a dent into the kind of addiction Dexter suffers from? Perhaps indirectly, it seems." Television Without Pity gave the episode a "B+" grade.

Tony Goldwyn submitted this episode for consideration for Outstanding Directing for a Drama Series at the 60th Primetime Emmy Awards.
