= Morning Comes (Dexter) =

- Dexter episode
- Episode no.: Season 2 Episode 8
- Directed by: Keith Gordon
- Written by: Scott Buck
- Cinematography by: Romeo Tirone
- Editing by: Chris Figler
- Original release date: November 18, 2007
- Running time: 49 minutes

Guest appearances
- Tony Amendola as Santos Jimenez; Bruce Weitz as Lenny Asher; Jaime Murray as Lila West; Keith Carradine as Frank Lundy

Episode chronology
← Previous "That Night, A Forest Grew"	Next → "Resistance Is Futile"
- Dexter season 2

"Morning Comes" is the eighth episode of the second season and twentieth overall episode of the American television drama series Dexter, which first aired on November 18, 2007 on Showtime in the United States. The episode was written by co-executive producer Scott Buck and was directed by Keith Gordon.

Set in Miami, the series centers on Dexter Morgan, a forensic technician specializing in bloodstain pattern analysis for the fictional Miami Metro Police Department, who leads a secret parallel life as a vigilante serial killer, hunting down murderers who have not been adequately punished by the justice system due to corruption or legal technicalities. In the episode, Dexter is targeted by the return of Santos Jimenez, while Miami Metro discovers a new clue about the Bay Harbor Butcher.

According to Nielsen Media Research, the episode was seen by an estimated 1.23 million household viewers and gained a 0.6/1 ratings share among adults aged 18–49, making it the most watched episode of the series by that point. The episode received critical acclaim, who praised the tension, writing and character development.

== Plot ==
Dexter (Michael C. Hall) allows Lila (Jaime Murray) to stay with him at the apartment. He also visits Rita (Julie Benz) to return an action figure that Cody left with him. While she appreciates his help, she also asks him to stop visiting her and the children.

To help with the Bay Harbor Butcher case, Lundy (Keith Carradine) brings in more FBI agents to investigate law enforcement in the city. He brings up a 2002 case where a murderous drug dealer, Anthony Rodrigo, was allowed to walk free after the blood work showed he was innocent, then the Bay Harbor Butcher killed him. He questions Dexter, as he was the one who performed the blood work. While Dexter maintains his results were correct, he subsequently admits he made a mistake. That night, Dexter is stabbed in the bowling alley parking lot by Santos Jimenez (Tony Amendola), but he only tells it to Lila. Debra (Jennifer Carpenter) accepts Lundy's invitation to dine with him, and they end up kissing afterward.

As LaGuerta (Lauren Vélez) helps him find a new job, Doakes (Erik King) is questioned by Lundy, as some of the Butcher's victims were cases investigated by Doakes. Realizing they walked away due to the blood tests, Doakes concludes that Dexter is heavily involved. He subsequently breaks into Dexter's apartment, discovering his hidden collection of blood slides. During this, Dexter travels to Naples and stalks Jimenez at his cabin. He manages to intercept him and kills him using a chainsaw, the same way Jimenez killed his mother. Debra and Angel (David Zayas) discover that the car carrying Rodrigo on the night of his disappearance was held as police evidence, confirming the Butcher works at Miami Metro.

Before disposing of Jimenez's body, Dexter discovers that he knew about his location at the bowling alley, concluding that Lila gave it to him. Rita also calls him, who finds her door unlocked, unaware that Lila has broken into her house. He is forced to leave Jimenez's body and return to Miami to secure Rita's safety. He then confronts Lila for stealing her key, also obtaining evidence that she might have orchestrated her own arson. When Lila admits it, Dexter breaks up with her and threatens her if she ever intimidates Rita and her children again.

== Production ==
=== Development ===
The episode was written by co-executive producer Scott Buck and was directed by Keith Gordon. This was Buck's second writing credit, and Gordon's third directing credit.

== Reception ==
=== Viewers ===
In its original American broadcast, "Morning Comes" was seen by an estimated 1.23 million household viewers with a 0.6/1 in the 18–49 demographics. This means that 0.6 percent of all households with televisions watched the episode, while 1 percent of all of those watching television at the time of the broadcast watched it. This was a 46% increase in viewership from the previous episode, which was watched by an estimated 0.84 million household viewers with a 0.4/1 in the 18–49 demographics.

=== Critical reviews ===
"Morning Comes" received critical acclaim. Eric Goldman of IGN gave the episode a "great" 8.8 out of 10, and wrote, "Doakes didn't wear gloves at Dexter's either, meaning his finger prints will be all over his place, and it could end up looking like he planted the evidence. Hmm... One thing's for sure - when a show has you this involved and theorizing this much on what could happen, it's working especially well."

Scott Tobias of The A.V. Club gave the episode an "A" grade and wrote, "Has Dexter really regressed as far as he claims here or is this yet another case of Dexter the unreliable narrator? I suspect he'll find his way back to the light at some point, but for now, it's fun to have him back in the shadows."

Alan Sepinwall wrote, "Once again, we have knowledge that the characters don't, and it could be completely reasonable that Lundy would just interpret Dexter as being nervous for having screwed up a case through inattention. But I hope this storyline doesn't get resolved by the writers selling out Lundy as not nearly as clever as he's seemed to this point." Paula Paige of TV Guide wrote, "We are a mere four weeks away from the demise of the second season and the beginning of a long wait until the third. The thought is paralyzing. I take my TV watching very seriously! And this episode was a shining example of why this show is so good and entertaining and why the next four weeks will be worth staying tuned."

Keith McDuffee of TV Squad wrote, "I seriously think it makes a hell of a lot more sense that Doakes will die before the season's out, otherwise we're talking lengthy court cases that will certainly start leading away from Doakes and toward Dexter -- that couldn't play out all that well for him." Television Without Pity gave the episode an "A" grade.

Keith Carradine submitted this episode for consideration for Outstanding Guest Actor in a Drama Series, while Jaime Murray submitted it for Outstanding Guest Actress in a Drama Series at the 60th Primetime Emmy Awards.
