= The Dark Defender =

- Dexter episode
- Dexter Morgan (Michael C. Hall) imagines himself in a room with his younger self (Maxwell Huckabee), his biological mother Laura Moser (Sage Kirkpatrick), and his future adoptive father Harry Morgan (James Remar)
- Episode no.: Season 2 Episode 5
- Directed by: Keith Gordon
- Written by: Timothy Schlattmann
- Production code: 205
- Original air date: October 28, 2007

Guest appearances
- JoBeth Williams as Gail Brandon; Tony Amendola as Santos Jimenez; Jaime Murray as Lila Tournay; Keith Carradine as Frank Lundy; Christina Robinson as Astor Bennett; Preston Bailey as Cody Bennett; Katherine Kirkpatrick as Laura Moser; Maxwell Huckabee as young Dexter Morgan; Dave Baez as Gabriel; Tasia Sherel as Francis; Travis Winfrey as Reynolds; Eddie Kehler as Droning Man; Charlene Amoia as Young woman; Jim Hanks as Annoyed man; Vince Pavia as Lipsey; Brian Gattas as Welsh; Kim Delgado as Desk sergeant

Episode chronology
← Previous "See-Through"	Next → "Dex, Lies, and Videotape"
- Dexter (season 2)

"The Dark Defender" is the fifth episode of the second season and seventeenth overall episode of the American television drama series Dexter, which first aired on October 28, 2007, on Showtime in the United States. The episode was written by Timothy Schlattmann and was directed by Keith Gordon.

In the episode, Dexter Morgan (Michael C. Hall) investigates a crime scene in a comic book store where he sees a poster of The Dark Defender, a character inspired by Dexter's own crimes under the guise of the "Bay Harbor Butcher", who is currently under investigation in his own police department. After he dreams that The Dark Defender saved his mother's life when he was young, Dexter's Narcotics Anonymous sponsor Lila Tournay (Jaime Murray) encourages him to seek closure by confronting one of his mother's killers, Santos Jimenez (Tony Amendola). Meanwhile, Dexter's sister Debra (Jennifer Carpenter) suspects that her new boyfriend Gabriel (Dave Baez) is using her to write a book about her engagement to the first season's "Ice Truck Killer".

Schlattmann was inspired to set the homicide case in a comic book store when he realized that an Aquaman snow globe on his desk "could easily be a murder weapon". When he visited comic book artist Tone Rodriguez to draw and render the poster of The Dark Defender, comic book writer Dan Wickline was also at Rodriguez's studio, and so Schlattmann arranged for the two to have cameo appearances in the episode. The episode was filmed in Los Angeles, California though set in Miami, Florida. "The Dark Defender" was praised by critics and Schlattmann was nominated for Writers Guild of America Award for his script. The episode was also submitted as Dexter's sample episode to determine the nominees for Outstanding Drama Series at the 60th Primetime Emmy Awards; though nominated, the series didn't win.

== Plot ==
While drinking coffee with Debra, Dexter is called to a comic book store where the shopkeeper has been bludgeoned to death with a snow globe. Dexter sees a poster of The Dark Defender, a vigilante killer based on the Bay Harbor Butcher. Later, at his Narcotics Anonymous meeting, Dexter falls asleep and has a dream in which he, dressed as the Dark Defender, rescues his mother, Laura Moser. When he tells his sponsor, Lila, about his dream, she tells him that he must confront his mother's killers to seek closure. He and Lila travel to Naples, Florida, where one of the three men, Santos Jimenez, runs a tavern.

Having been warned by Rita's mother, Gail, to leave her and her children alone, Dexter tells Rita that he is going away while Gail is visiting. Leaving Lila in their motel room, he goes to Jimenez's bar and waits until closing time to confront him. When Jimenez brandishes a baseball bat, Dexter disarms and beats him, revealing his identity as Laura's son. Jimenez tells Dexter that his mother was killed for being Harry's narcotics informant and lover. Dexter is prepared to kill Jimenez until Lila phones, prompting him to tell her that he is about to "use." Thinking that he is about to use drugs, she urges him not to go any further, because "using" will only leave him empty and alone inside. A distraught Dexter returns to the motel, leaving Jimenez unconscious, and falls asleep in Lila's lap.

The following day, Lila confides to Dexter that she went into rehab after getting high on methamphetamine and setting her ex-boyfriend's house on fire, unaware that he was inside. Dexter asks her if she thinks that he deserved to die, something that Lila silently agrees to. Dexter tells her that, "It's okay then." Meanwhile, Debra is insecure around Gabriel because of how her previous relationship with Brian ended. Looking through Gabriel's e-mail, she sees that he has sent a book titled The Ice Princess to a number of publishers. Assuming he is writing a tell-all book about her, she angrily breaks up with him. Discussing the break-up with Lundy, he gives her the background check that he had run on Gabriel, revealing that he is a children's writer; Debra realizes that The Ice Princess is a children's book.

When Dexter returns to Miami and visits Rita, Gail—suspecting that he is hiding something—announces that she will be living with Rita from now on. Dexter realizes that he must protect his secrets, so he begins by cleaning his boat that night with a black light to detect any blood. He is unaware that the marina is being videotaped by the Miami-Metro PD, who believe that the Bay Harbor Butcher may be keeping his boat at that marina.

== Production ==
Schlattmann thought to write the comic book store homicide storyline when he picked up the Aquaman snow globe in his office and thought, "'Wow, this thing could easily be a murder weapon," because of its weight and its edge. The writers wanted to use the actual Aquaman globe but DC Comics would not allow the character and the snow globe to be used in the episode, so the Dexter art department custom-made a snow globe. The superhero's name ultimately became "Mariner" as other names including "Sea King" and "King of the Seas" could not be used for legal reasons. Trademark and copyright clearances was again an issue when finding a name for the superhero based on the Bay Harbor Butcher. "The Eradicator" and "Judge Justice" were considered, but the final choice was "The Dark Defender". Cerone said that the name was "a little on the generic side, but it was one we could clear." He said that The Dark Defender was in part an homage to Batman: The Dark Knight Returns and to Dexter's Dark Passenger, featured in Jeff Lindsay's series of Dexter novels on which the television series is based. On the poster, The Dark Defender, though hooded, was drawn with a smile to resemble Michael C. Hall. The poster was rendered by comic artist Tone Rodriguez, with whom Schlattmann had previously worked on a screenplay in development at 20th Century Fox. When Schlattmann visited Rodriguez's studio in Los Angeles to discuss the art, comic book writer Dan Wickline was also there. Schlattmann thought that "by including the two of them, we could make things a bit more special and add some credibility to the show". Wickline played the dead comic book shopkeeper, while Rodriguez played the prime suspect for the murder. The Dark Defender character also lent its name to a series of highly stylized Dexter webisodes, recapping Dexter's victims of the second season.

The scenes at the marina where Dexter keeps his boat, Coral Cove, were filmed at the Leeward Bay Marina in Los Angeles' Wilmington neighborhood, in spite of the show's Miami setting. The episode opens in a coffee bar at Coral Cove Marina, which was filmed at Leeward Bay's floating diner, the Chowder Barge. One of the empty barns at Long Beach, California's Shoreline Village was set up as the comic book store. Doakes and LaGuerta discuss the homicide case while standing on the Shoreline Village boardwalk, and the Village car park was used to film Doakes and LaGuerta's stake out.

== Reception ==
Eric Goldman of IGN called "The Dark Defender" "a very satisfying episode of the show" and thought that "so far [the cast and crew are] doing a very good job" of replicating the tension seen in the first season. He was impressed by Dexter's discoveries about his birth mother and adoptive father, but called Debra's romance with Gabriel a "less successful" storyline. Writing for the Los Angeles Times, Tom O'Neil called the episode a "standout" because of the parts of Dexter's past that it explored. He stated that, for regular viewers, "this episode is a real knockout", but for unfamiliar viewers, "this whole Dark Defender bit might look pretty corny". TV Squad's Keith McDuffee believed the revelation of Laura's affair with Harry to be "certainly the most shocking moment of the episode", and thought that "One of the brilliant moments of the season so far was Dexter going after one of his mom's killers." Paula Paige of TV Guide called Dexter's monologue about his hollowness "very moving". She thought that his confrontation with his mother's killer "may have been one of the best shot [scenes] in the whole series". Blogcritics' Ray Ellis praised the "razor-sharp sense of humor" seen in the episode and thought that "In a season of mostly dreary, bland series, Dexter remains the most daring show on television." Dexter and Jimenez's confrontation was named Hall's best scene by Variety critic Stuart Levine.

In a short recap of seasons 1 and 2 in Film Quarterly, J. M. Tyree called "The Dark Defender" season 2's "most intriguing episode", and compared Dexter to Batman:

When the identities of the Butcher's victims are revealed to be murderers, the public applauds him, elevating Dexter to the status of a folktale avenger or comic-book anti-hero. And indeed Rita excoriates him for disappearing at night "like Clark fucking Kent," but the FBI describes the Butcher as more like one's own "personal Batman." Batman is an apt comparison, although Dexter prefers to violate Batman's aversion to killing. Both live outside the law, "part human, part mutant," as Dexter puts it. Both cling to an ethos riddled with perplexities and contradictions. Visiting a comic-book shop, Dexter find himself transformed on a handmade superhero poster from Butcher into The Dark Defender, a protector of the city and the executioner of its predators. Vigilantes simultaneously share territory with cops and outlaws, they break the law in the hopes of helping society. ... Dexter describes being "half sick with the thrill, the complete wrongness," when the "dark passenger" inside him takes command.

Schlattmann was nominated for a Writers Guild of America Award for his work on this episode in the Episodic Drama category. "The Dark Defender" was submitted to the Primetime Emmy Awards judging panel to determine nominees for the Outstanding Drama Series award; Dexter was one of the top ten candidates and became one of the 6 series nominated for the award. The episode was also unsuccessfully submitted for Emmys for Outstanding Writing (Timothy Schlattmann) and Outstanding Directing (Keith Gordon) in a Drama Series.
