= Sage Kirkpatrick =

Czech actress (b. 1969)

- Born: Czech Republic
- Occupation: Actress
- Years active: 1998–present

Sage Kirkpatrick is a Czech actress best known for playing Dexter Morgan's mother, Laura Moser, in the Showtime TV drama series, Dexter. She is sometimes credited under the name Katherine Kirkpatrick.

== Career ==
Kirkpatrick began her acting career appearing in erotic movies and television series such as Ultimate Love Games, Club Wild Side and Beverly Hills Bordello. She also made guest appearances on Days of Our Lives, The O.C., The Shield and CSI: Crime Scene Investigation.

Credited under the name Katherine Kirkpatrick, she appeared in seasons one, two and three of Dexter, in the episodes, "Seeing Red", "Born Free", "The Dark Defender", "Dex, Lies, and Videotape", "Turning Biminese" and "Do You Take Dexter Morgan?".

After Dexter, Kirkpatrick made guest appearances on episodes of Scandal, House of Lies, How to Get Away with Murder and Grey's Anatomy. Kirkpatrick also works as a professional photographer.

== Filmography ==
Film
Year	Title	Role	Notes
1998	Hundred Percent	Tanya Rhodes	
1998	Ultimate Love Games	Sharon	Direct-to-video
1998	Restless Souls	Donna	Direct-to-video
1998	Alien Erotica	Monique	
1998	Club Wild Side	Haley	
1999	Voyeur	Kris Foster	
1999	Stripper Wives	Daphne	
2000	Baby Luv	Sabrina	
2002	The Rose Technique	Emily	
2007	The Savages	Real Estate Agent	
2017	I Believe	Apartment Manager	
2017	Nowhere to Turn	Dr. Lisa James	Short film
2016	Fishes 'n Loaves: Heaven Sent	Norma	
2020	Donna Stronger Than Pretty	Clerk Sage	
2021	My Melancholy Baby	Claire	Short film
2022	Thanksgiving Mascarade	Evelyn	
2023	Welcome		Short film
2023	Fangs Out		
2023	Apocalypse Love Story	Dr. Holland	
2024	Palmdale	Deb	Short film

Television
Year	Title	Role	Notes
1998	Beverly Hills Bordello	Moira	2 episodes
1999–2001	Days of Our Lives	Jill; Nurse #2; Rachel Griffith; Tricia	4 episodes
2000	Twice in a Lifetime	Bingo	1 episode
2001	Roswell	Melissa Foster	1 episode
2001	Arrest & Trial	Lucy Post	1 episode
2001	State of Grace	Wendy	1 episode
2003	Dragnet	Denise Blondine	1 episode
2004	The O.C.	Alexis	1 episode
2005	The Shield	Emily	1 episode
2006–2008	Dexter	Laura Moser	6 episodes
2007	CSI: Crime Scene Investigation	Suzy Gibbons	1 episode
2008	Heroes	Neighbor's Wife	1 episode
2012	Scandal	Bartender	1 episode
2013	House of Lies	Heidi	1 episode
2014	Stalker	Rosemary Wilson	1 episode
2014	How to Get Away with Murder	Alice	1 episode
2016	Grey's Anatomy	Carolyn Adkins	1 episode
