= Morning Comes =

Morning Comes may refer to:

- Morning Comes (album), a 2011 album by Cuff the Duke
- "Morning Comes" (Dexter), an episode of the American television drama series Dexter
