= The British Invasion (Dexter) =

- Dexter episode
- Episode no.: Season 2 Episode 12
- Directed by: Steve Shill
- Story by: Daniel Cerone; Melissa Rosenberg
- Teleplay by: Daniel Cerone
- Production code: 212
- Original air date: December 16, 2007

Guest appearances
- Jaime Murray as Lila Tournay; Christina Robinson as Astor Bennett; Preston Bailey as Cody Bennett; Geoff Pierson as Tom Matthews; Keith Carradine as Frank Lundy; Mary Alyce Kania as Karen; Maxwell Huckabee as young Dexter Morgan; Jonathan Banks as FBI Deputy Director Max Adams; Eli Goodman as Detective Weiss; Gary Kraus as Sheriff Burns; Darryl Sivad as Minister; Troy Metcalf as Cabbie; Manny Suarez as Mayor; L.T. Tolliver as Uniform Cop; Stephanie Y. Wang as Lexi

Episode chronology
← Previous "Left Turn Ahead"	Next → "Our Father"
- Dexter (season 2)

"The British Invasion" is the twelfth episode and finale of the second season, and twenty-fourth overall episode, of the American television drama series Dexter, which first aired on December 16, 2007 on Showtime in the United States. The episode was written by Daniel Cerone (based on a story by Cerone and Melissa Rosenberg) and was directed by Steve Shill. In the episode, Lila Tournay (Jaime Murray) finds Sgt. James Doakes (Erik King) imprisoned in an Everglades cabin and learns from him that her object of affection, Dexter Morgan (Michael C. Hall), is the serial killer known as the "Bay Harbor Butcher". She decides to help Dexter and kills Doakes by setting the cabin on fire. Meanwhile, Dexter's sister Debra (Jennifer Carpenter) questions whether her career is more important than her relationship with FBI Special Agent Frank Lundy (Keith Carradine).

"The British Invasion" was filmed in early November 2007. Doakes's death, according to Dexter's writers, was premeditated from the show's pilot episode because the character was "too good to not kill". The episode was seen by 1.4 million viewers, according to Nielsen ratings, and received mixed reviews from critics. It was nominated for an Emmy Award for Outstanding Cinematography for a One-Hour Series and a Golden Reel Award for Best Sound Editing – Sound Effects and Foley for Short Form Television. The episode was included in TV Guide's 100 Greatest TV Episodes at no. 49.

== Plot ==
Using Dexter's GPS system, Lila arrives at his cabin in the Everglades. She breaks in to find an imprisoned Doakes, who tells her that Dexter is the Bay Harbor Butcher. However, Lila sympathizes with Dexter for having to hide such an enormous secret, and refuses to free Doakes. Convinced that Dexter is her soulmate, Lila tries to help him by blowing up the cabin with Doakes inside, killing him. Lundy's task force determines Doakes's location, and Dexter has to race his colleagues to reach the cabin first. When he arrives, he discovers that it has been destroyed and initially believes it to be a miracle but wonders if it is Satan's work. The next morning, the police find Doakes' body, while Dexter embraces his freedom. He visits Rita's house, where they reconcile after having sex.

With all of the evidence pointing to Doakes as the Bay Harbor Butcher, the case is closed. LaGuerta, grieving the loss of her former partner, is in denial over Doakes' incrimination and tries to collect donations for his memorial service. Debra remains determined not to let the end of the Bay Harbor Butcher case break up her relationship with Lundy, but their plans for a vacation are crushed when Lundy is called to Oregon to work on another murder case. Masuka tells Dexter the gas in the cabin was turned on while the stove was lit. When Dexter sees his own GPS while cataloging evidence, he realizes that Lila must have found the cabin. He meets with her at the aquarium and tells her that he, like her, has no emotion and lives a life devoid of feeling. They form plans to leave Miami together, though Dexter secretly intends to kill her.

The next day, Dexter visits Lila's apartment, only to find Debra there trying to persuade Lila to leave town. When Dexter is forced to lie about running away in front of Debra, a bitter Lila then leaves with what she recognizes as Dexter's bag of murder equipment. Lila goes to Rita's house and drugs the babysitter so that she can abduct Astor and Cody. When Dexter realizes they are missing and goes to confront Lila, she lights another fire and locks the three of them inside her apartment. Rita calls Debra for her help, prompting her to skip her flight with Lundy to help with finding the children. Dexter manages to free Astor and Cody through a small window and eventually rams down a thin wall to escape. Sometime later, Dexter tracks Lila to Paris and kills her in her hotel room. Back in Miami, he attends Doakes's memorial service with LaGuerta. Debra and Angel are awarded for their work on the Bay Harbor Butcher case.

== Production ==
Dexter staff writers Daniel Cerone and Melissa Rosenberg were initially planning to write the script of the finale together. They were in the process of developing the story, however, when Rosenberg was hired to write the film adaptation of the novel Twilight. She described Cerone as "incredibly understanding" when she asked him to write the teleplay himself, though they had both worked on the episode's story.

The writers planned from the pilot episode to eventually kill Doakes off the show. Executive producer Clyde Phillips said that Doakes "always had a shelf life because of the collision course [with Dexter]", while executive producer Sara Colleton believed it would be unrealistic to keep Doakes on for a third season without having him discover that Dexter is a murderer. Rosenberg said that risks had to be taken on the show, and Doakes was "too good to not kill". The character was killed to prevent recycling of used ideas, so that the writers would "stay aggressive and on top of it rather than repeat ourselves", according to Phillips. Erik King, who plays Doakes, mentioned the difficulty in killing Doakes off the show because Dexter could not murder an innocent man, and so Lila was Doakes' killer.

Filming of "The British Invasion" concluded production on the second season, and ended in early November 2007. Filming locations for the episode included Miami, Florida as well as Palos Verdes Estates (including Rolling Hills United Methodist Church), Long Beach (including the Aquarium of the Pacific), Marina del Rey, Rolling Hills Estates, and Los Angeles, California. A "skeleton crew" flew to France to film scenes of Lila walking the streets of Paris.

== Reception ==
"The British Invasion" drew 1.4 million viewers on its first broadcast, a 14 percent improvement from the first season finale, "Born Free". It was Dexter's most-watched episode until the airing of the third-season finale, "Do You Take Dexter Morgan?".

"The British Invasion" received positive to mixed reviews from critics. Eric Goldman of IGN felt that the episode was thrilling and intriguing, though ultimately "not quite terrific" and rated it 7.8/10. He found Doakes's death dramatically unsatisfying since Dexter was absent, and was disappointed with Debra's portrayal as "relentlessly needy". The A.V. Club's Scott Tobias gave the episode a B+ grade, saying that the episode was "for the most part exciting and satisfying". He felt cheated, however, that Dexter was not forced to decide whether to kill Doakes, and was disappointed that Lila's character primarily served as a plot device. Writing for TV Guide, Paula Paige believed that the finale "did not disappoint". She was particularly impressed by Debra's choice to leave Lundy and LaGuerta's grief over Doakes's death. TV Squad's Keith McDuffee thought that "The British Invasion" was unsurprising and predictable but enjoyable nonetheless. Zap2it reviewer Daniel Fienberg felt that the episode was disappointing in comparison to the first-season finale, "Born Free". He was displeased with the unheroic circumstances of Doakes's death, the lack of direction in LaGuerta's character arc and the abrupt end to Debra and Lundy's relationship. DVD Verdict's Adam Arseneau called the finale "preposterous" but still "one of the most entertaining cable show finales in recent memory".

Cinematographer Romeo Tirone's work on the episode was nominated for a Primetime Emmy Award for Outstanding Cinematography for a One Hour Series, and Dexter's team of sound editors were nominated for a Golden Reel Award for "The British Invasion" in the category of Best Sound Editing – Sound Effects and Foley for Short Form Television. The episode was unsuccessfully submitted to the Primetime Emmy Awards judging panel for consideration for Outstanding Directing (Steve Shill) and Outstanding Supporting Actor (C. S. Lee).
