= Markus Flanagan =

American actor (born 1964)

- Born: August 20, 1964 (age 61); Bryn Mawr, Pennsylvania, U.S.
- Occupation: Actor
- Years active: 1988–present

Markus Flanagan (born August 20, 1964) is an American actor.

== Career ==
In 1990, he starred in the short-lived ABC police drama Sunset Beat alongside George Clooney, Michael Deluise and Erik King.

He was a series regular on NBC's Nurses for season two playing Luke, the rebel nurse.

Flanagan co-starred in the Nickelodeon series Unfabulous as Jeff Singer, the father of Emma Roberts' character, from 2004 to 2007. His other television credits include CSI: Crime Scene Investigation, CSI: Miami, Judging Amy, Northern Exposure and Friends. He also had recurring roles as Harry Dean on Fox's Melrose Place, as Mark on the Peabody award-winning show Better Things, and from 2019 - 2023 as Gerald Drummond on the Apple TV+ series The Morning Show.

He has appeared in over 125 television episodes with roles on; Friends, CSI, CSI Miami, NCIS, Major Crimes, Bones, Agents of S.H.I.E.L.D., Will & Grace, Seinfeld, Veronica's Closet, The Morning Show and many others.

His film roles include Biloxi Blues directed by Mike Nichols, Blue Steel directed by Kathryn Bigelow, Born on the 4th of July directed by Oliver Stone, The Kingdom directed by Peter Berg among others.

Flanagan studied with Sanford Meisner in the last class taught by Meisner at Neighborhood Playhouse Acting School in New York City.

He is the author of One Less Bitter Actor: An Actor's Survival Guide.
