= Waiting to Exhale (Dexter) =

- Dexter episode
- Dexter Morgan (Michael C. Hall) hallucinates a conversation between himself and his deceased brother Brian Moser (Christian Camargo)
- Episode no.: Season 2 Episode 2
- Directed by: Marcos Siega
- Written by: Clyde Phillips
- Cinematography by: Romeo Tirone
- Editing by: Rob Seidenglanz
- Original release date: October 7, 2007
- Running time: 56 minutes

Guest appearances
- Geoff Pierson as Thomas Matthews; Christian Camargo as Brian Moser; Judith Scott as Esmée Pascal; Keith Carradine as Frank Lundy

Episode chronology
← Previous "It's Alive!"	Next → "An Inconvenient Lie"
- Dexter season 2

"Waiting to Exhale" is the second episode of the second season and fourteenth overall episode of the American television drama series Dexter, which first aired on October 7, 2007 on Showtime in the United States. The episode was written by executive producer Clyde Phillips and was directed by Marcos Siega.

Set in Miami, the series centers on Dexter Morgan, a forensic technician specializing in bloodstain pattern analysis for the fictional Miami Metro Police Department, who leads a secret parallel life as a vigilante serial killer, hunting down murderers who have not been adequately punished by the justice system due to corruption or legal technicalities. In the episode, Dexter tries to find and kill Little Chino, while dealing with the discovery of his murders.

According to Nielsen Media Research, the episode was seen by an estimated 0.89 million household viewers and gained a 0.4/1 ratings share among adults aged 18–49. The episode received mostly positive reviews from critics, who praised the performances, writing and character development.

== Plot ==
The police continue piling up bodies from the harbor, nicknaming the killer as the "Bay Harbor Butcher." Dexter (Michael C. Hall) is stressed over the discovery of the bodies while also investigating a murder related to Little Chino. The woman murdered, Eva, left a child, and Dexter expresses guilt that he could've prevented her death by killing Little Chino.

The FBI is also involved in the investigation, with Agent Frank Lundy (Keith Carradine) assigned to the case. He forms a task force between Miami Metro and the FBI; Doakes (Erik King), who admires Lundy, asks to join, but Lundy feels he does not work as a team member. The department is surprised when Little Chino (Matt Willig) walks into the station with his lawyer, providing them with security footage that gives him an alibi in Eva's murder. Dexter avoids Little Chino but sets out to kill him. That night, Dexter tries to intercept Little Chino at his house but it is a trap set up by Little Chino, forcing him to escape.

Rita (Julie Benz) is shaken while arranging Paul's funeral, still not telling her children about it. Dexter does not believe she should spend money on him, but an upset Rita demands that he respect her decision. At the funeral, Dexter hallucinates that Brian (Christian Camargo) is watching over him. LaGuerta (Lauren Vélez) notices that Pascal (Judith Scott) is having problems with her fiancé, Bertrand, and often covers for her. LaGuerta is further worried when she discovers that Pascal wiretapped his phone conversations. Debra (Jennifer Carpenter) refuses to move out of Dexter's apartment, and despite wanting to go back to the police force, she is still traumatized by her experience with Brian.

After a kid identifies Little Chino's gang as Eva's murderers, Little Chino sets out to kill the kid. Dexter arrives in time to sedate him and save the kid. Properly tying Little Chino, Dexter executes him. He takes the body to a new location that will take it to the Gulf Stream, which will become more challenging for anyone to discover. Content with finally getting the gang arrested, Debra decides she is ready to move out. Rita calls Dexter to visit her, and she reveals she found Paul's shoe. She explains that Paul believes Dexter knocked him out and drugged him, to which Dexter confirms, but claims he took the drugs from the police department.

Nevertheless, Rita is confused over how Dexter knew how to cook heroin, and Dexter proclaims he has an addiction. Rita believes it is related to drugs and comforts him, believing that is the reason why he often leaves at night. Dexter goes to the marina, deciding that he must move forward, and that involves getting over Brian. He removes the Barbie doll from his keychain, causing the hallucination of Brian to fade out.

== Production ==
=== Development ===
The episode was written by executive producer Clyde Phillips and was directed by Marcos Siega. This was Phillips' second writing credit, and Siega's first directing credit.

== Reception ==
=== Viewers ===
In its original American broadcast, "Waiting to Exhale" was seen by an estimated 0.89 million household viewers with a 0.4/1 in the 18–49 demographics. This means that 0.4 percent of all households with televisions watched the episode, while 1 percent of all of those watching television at the time of the broadcast watched it. This was a 12% decrease in viewership from the previous episode, which was watched by an estimated 1.01 million household viewers with a 0.5/1 in the 18–49 demographics.

=== Critical reviews ===
"Waiting to Exhale" received mostly positive reviews from critics. Eric Goldman of IGN gave the episode a "great" 8.4 out of 10, and wrote, "A problem Dexter sometimes has rears it's [sic] head here in a scene when Dexter relates very strongly to a young girl, which is displayed via some very direct flashbacks - subtlety is often not this show's strong point. But overall, this is another interesting episode that does a solid job of looking at Dexter's relationship with various adversaries, past and present - Rudy, Little Chino, and Lundy - and showing how he reacts to their presence in his life."

Scott Tobias of The A.V. Club gave the episode a "B+" grade and wrote, "After the reckoning of last season's finale, in which Dexter's put down his brother, and the first episode of this one, in which Rita's ex Paul gets killed in prison, “Waiting To Exhale” turns into a strong meditation on grief, and the various ways people say goodbye to the flawed souls that have shaped their lives. In other words, it was basically an episode of Six Feet Under, except the deaths here are of unnatural causes." Alan Sepinwall of The Star-Ledger wrote, "Rita, meanwhile, confronts Dexter with far more strength and savvy than she would have been able to show when we first met her, and I like that she automatically makes the leap to Dexter being a heroin addict. After all, why on earth would she suspect something as outlandish as her boyfriend being the Bay Harbor Butcher, and why wouldn't she guess that he had a similar problem to the other love of her life? Dexter admitting to an addiction (albeit not the one Rita thinks he has) is going to lead to a lot of fun in the coming weeks."

Paula Paige of TV Guide wrote, "Whoever came up with the idea that has Dexter working on his own case is pretty brilliant. We are in for a real treat this season." Daniel Fienberg of Zap2it wrote, "the women are becoming more interesting and complicated on Dexter this season. In addition to Deb's reaction to trauma, we've seen an evolution of Rita over the past two episodes. Would last year's Rita have been so quick to catch Dexter in his lie about planting the drugs on her deceased hubby? Sure, she jumped to the wrong conclusions about him, but that misjudgment will pay immediate dividends."

Keith McDuffee of TV Squad wrote, "what now with Rita? He's admitted his addiction, though not exactly the way Rita thinks, of course. This is by far the most brilliant aspect of this season, one you'll see play out starting next week." Television Without Pity gave the episode a "B+" grade.

Julie Benz submitted this episode for consideration for Outstanding Supporting Actress in a Drama Series at the 60th Primetime Emmy Awards.
