= Dex, Lies, and Videotape =

- Dexter episode
- James Doakes (Erik King) pries into Dexter Morgan's (Michael C. Hall) past.
- Episode no.: Season 2 Episode 6
- Directed by: Nick Gomez
- Written by: Lauren Gussis
- Cinematography by: Romeo Tirone
- Editing by: Louis Cioffi
- Original release date: November 4, 2007
- Running time: 53 minutes

Guest appearances
- JoBeth Williams as Gail Brandon; Silas Weir Mitchell as Ken Olson; Salvator Xuereb as John Henry; Jaime Murray as Lila Tourney; Keith Carradine as Frank Lundy

Episode chronology
← Previous "The Dark Defender"	Next → "That Night, A Forest Grew"
- Dexter season 2

"Dex, Lies, and Videotape" is the sixth episode of the second season and eighteenth overall episode of the American television drama series Dexter, which first aired on November 4, 2007, on Showtime in the United States. The episode was written by Lauren Gussis and was directed by Nick Gomez.

Set in Miami, the series centers on Dexter Morgan, a forensic technician specializing in bloodstain pattern analysis for the fictional Miami Metro Police Department, who leads a secret parallel life as a vigilante serial killer, hunting down murderers who have not been adequately punished by the justice system due to corruption or legal technicalities. In the episode, Dexter investigates more about Harry and Laura, while dealing with a copycat killer.

According to Nielsen Media Research, the episode was seen by an estimated 0.85 million household viewers and gained a 0.5 ratings share among adults aged 18–49. The episode received highly positive reviews from critics, who praised the tension, performances and character development.

== Plot ==
As Dexter (Michael C. Hall) analyzes the connection between his mother and Harry (James Remar), he helps Miami Metro in a new murder suspected to have been committed by the Bay Harbor Butcher. Feeling the influence of the Butcher, Lundy (Keith Carradine) declares that if there is another murder, the FBI will take over the operation.

During dinner, Lila (Jaime Murray) joins Dexter and Rita (Julie Benz) and remarks he is doing an excellent job during rehabilitation. Rita states that she likes Lila but feels uncertain about her presence. Dexter takes Rita to his apartment to have sex, but they are interrupted when Lila leaves a message revealing their trip. Rita is angry that Dexter lied and leaves. Doakes (Erik King) continues suspecting Dexter when he asks Debra (Jennifer Carpenter) about his drug addiction, and she claims he never used the drugs. He later sneaks into his office to listen to Harry's videotape with Laura, causing an argument between both. Dexter wants to file a complaint, but LaGuerta (Lauren Vélez) asks him to wait while she talks about it with Doakes. LaGuerta demands Doakes to stop harassing Dexter, but Doakes says he will take the risk.

Miami Metro and the FBI interrogate a suspect, Ken Olson (Silas Weir Mitchell), who matches the description of the Bay Harbor Butcher. After learning that he was filmed while cleaning his boat at the marina, Dexter becomes desperate and tries to delete the video, which he eventually manages to do before computer upgrades enable its viewing by his colleagues. Lundy is hesitant that Olson is the killer, given that his MO is slightly different, and he is sloppy in the murders. Dexter visits Lila to scold her for ruining his relationship with Rita. In the conversation, he kisses her, and they end up having sex.

That night, Dexter sneaks into Olson's house to confront him. Olson tries to defend his decisions, but Dexter concludes Olson only cares about the benefits the deaths can bring to him and kills him. Instead of dropping him in the ocean, he leaves his chopped body for Lundy's task force, sending a message to stop other people from imitating him and preventing Lundy from giving the case to the FBI. Dexter visits Rita at her house to explain his encounter with Lila, stating he did not have sex with her that night. His comment takes Rita aback, and she breaks up with him. Dexter visits Lila, and she lets him enter.

== Production ==
=== Development ===
The episode was written by Lauren Gussis and was directed by Nick Gomez. This was Buck's first writing credit, and Gomez's second directing credit.

== Reception ==
=== Viewers ===
In its original American broadcast, "Dex, Lies, and Videotape" was seen by an estimated 0.85 million household viewers with a 0.5 in the 18–49 demographics. This means that 0.5 percent of all households with televisions watched the episode. This was a 34% increase in viewership from the previous episode, which was watched by an estimated 0.63 million household viewers with a 0.3/1 in the 18–49 demographics.

=== Critical reviews ===
"Dex, Lies, and Videotape" received highly positive reviews from critics. Eric Goldman of IGN gave the episode a "great" 8.9 out of 10, and wrote, "The strong second season of Dexter is gaining a nice amount of momentum and is proving to be one of the best serialized dramas on the air right now. Dexter continued to listen to the tapes of Harry with his biological mother, Laura, gaining more insight into their secret relationship."

Scott Tobias of The A.V. Club gave the episode an "B" grade and wrote, "The show has been guilty in the past of turning everyday Miami Metro operations into sub-standard cop show fodder, and Carradine's character has turned that around. With him in the picture, even place-holder episodes like this one are highly watchable."

Alan Sepinwall wrote, "not sure what vibe I'm picking up off Lundy vis-a-vis Deb. Is he really just as guileless and straightforward as he appears - which would make him the perfect nemesis for a play-actor Dexter - or is his interest in Deb more than just a bit of fatherly mentoring?" Paula Paige of TV Guide wrote, "I know I've said this a hundred times before, but this was perhaps one of the best Dexter's ever written. Ever. I watched this ep a few days ago and have not stopped thinking about it since."

Keith McDuffee of TV Squad wrote, "What's been great is how, although Lundy seems to know something and to be inching ever-so closer to who the real Butcher is, Dexter stays incredibly cool and without a bead of sweat showing in the Floridian heat." Television Without Pity gave the episode a "B+" grade.
