= Resistance Is Futile (Dexter) =

- Dexter episode
- Episode no.: Season 2 Episode 9
- Directed by: Marcos Siega
- Written by: Melissa Rosenberg
- Cinematography by: Romeo Tirone
- Editing by: Louis Cioffi
- Original release date: November 25, 2007
- Running time: 50 minutes

Guest appearances
- Geoff Pierson as Thomas Matthews; Peter Macon as Leones; Tony Amendola as Santos Jimenez; Devon Graye as Teenage Dexter; Brian Scolaro as Lab Tech; Jaime Murray as Lila Tournay; Keith Carradine as Frank Lundy

Episode chronology
← Previous "Morning Comes"	Next → "There's Something About Harry"
- Dexter season 2

"Resistance Is Futile" is the ninth episode of the second season and twenty-first overall episode of the American television drama series Dexter, which first aired on November 25, 2007 on Showtime in the United States. The episode was written by Melissa Rosenberg and was directed by Marcos Siega.

Set in Miami, the series centers on Dexter Morgan, a forensic technician specializing in bloodstain pattern analysis for the fictional Miami Metro Police Department, who leads a secret parallel life as a vigilante serial killer, hunting down murderers who have not been adequately punished by the justice system due to corruption or legal technicalities. In the episode, Dexter discovers that the FBI is following him, while Doakes takes Dexter's blood slides with him.

According to Nielsen Media Research, the episode was seen by an estimated 1.03 million household viewers and gained a 0.5 ratings share among adults aged 18–49. The episode received critical acclaim, who praised the main storyline, performances and ending.

== Plot ==
While staying guard outside her house, Dexter (Michael C. Hall) apologizes to Rita (Julie Benz) for his affair with Lila (Jaime Murray). He drives off to dispose of Jimenez's body at the cabin but finds that a car is following him. The car belongs to the FBI, and some agents check his office to check the blood work database.

In Port-au-Prince, Doakes meets with a friend, Leones (Peter Macon), asking him to analyze Dexter's blood slides, but he does not have them with him. During this, Dexter discovers that the slides are missing but believes Lundy (Keith Carradine) has them. FBI Agents arrive and ask him to accompany them to the department, where Lundy and Matthews (Geoff Pierson) await him with the blood slides. Dexter believes he has been caught until Lundy and Matthews state that they suspect Doakes is the Bay Harbor Butcher. Given Doakes' erratic behavior and his investigation into the victims, they raided his car and found the slides. To cover himself, Dexter goes along with their theory, so the FBI makes a detail to protect him while appointing him to analyze the blood slides. Dexter uses this opportunity to cover his fingerprints.

Despite Dexter's warning, Lila flirts with Angel (David Zayas) and goes out with him and some others from the station for drinks. Dexter is forced to go with them, as he fears she will expose his connection to Jimenez. Doakes contacts LaGuerta (Lauren Vélez) to claim his innocence, which LaGuerta believes. Doakes refuses to surrender himself and sets out to find evidence to support himself, destroying his cell phone in the process. When Lundy plans to reveal Doakes as the prime suspect to the press, LaGuerta tries to get Debra (Jennifer Carpenter) to do something. They get into an argument, in which Debra finally yells that she is in a relationship with Lundy.

That night, Dexter escapes from his apartment and uses his boat to return to the cabin, where he chops Jimenez's body. As he leaves with the bags, he is held at gunpoint by Doakes, who tracks him with a GPS in the boat. Having discovered the trash bags, he has finally discovered he is the Butcher. Doakes forces Dexter to handcuff himself and walk toward him, but Dexter attacks him. Amidst the fight, Dexter gets shot in the leg, and they fall into the water, where Dexter uses the handcuffs to knock Doakes unconscious. Doakes later wakes up inside a cage inside the cabin, and Dexter locks the door behind him.

== Production ==
=== Development ===
The episode was written by co-executive producer Melissa Rosenberg and was directed by Marcos Siega. This was Rosenberg's fifth writing credit, and Siega's second directing credit.

== Reception ==
=== Viewers ===
In its original American broadcast, "Resistance Is Futile" was seen by an estimated 1.03 million household viewers with a 0.5 in the 18–49 demographics. This means that 0.5 percent of all households with televisions watched the episode. This was a 17% decrease in viewership from the previous episode, which was watched by an estimated 1.23 million household viewers with a 0.6/1 in the 18–49 demographics.

=== Critical reviews ===
"Resistance Is Futile" received critical acclaim. Eric Goldman of IGN gave the episode an "amazing" 9.5 out of 10, and wrote, "This is truly an excellent and nailbiting scenario the writers have crafted, leaving the show in a wonderfully suspenseful situation. In fact, it was so thrilling, it felt like the penultimate episode of the season, and it's hard to believe there's still three more weeks left. Either way, the show has certainly proved it can continue to grab the audience and I'm sure I'm not alone by far when I say I can't wait to see what happens next."

Scott Tobias of The A.V. Club gave the episode a "B+" grade and wrote, "for an episode that was all about tying up loose ends, there seemed to be new problems with each solution, and I tip my hat to the writers for keeping things less than tidy. That showdown with Doakes seemed at first like a conventional way to end their little cat-and-mouse game, with Doakes finally catching Dex in the act, only to have the tables turned on him."

Alan Sepinwall wrote, "I wouldn't call "Resistance Is Futile" a bad episode; Hall alone all but prevents the show from having one of those. But it's the first time all series where I'm genuinely concerned about the plan going forward. Writers are supposed to pull strings; it's their job. We're just not supposed to see them as clearly as we could last night." Paula Paige of TV Guide wrote, "Michael C. Hall's expressions in between dialogue were award worthy. Not much has been said here about this versatile actor, but last season I did mention his hotness. It's still intact, as is his talent. "All that self-reflection, it’s unhealthy." But the killing makes him sexier than ever."

Keith McDuffee of TV Squad wrote, "It wasn't a big surprise to me that Doakes would be brought in as the prime suspect in the BHB case. All the elements were there last week, from Doakes taking the slides to the overly-obvious mention of Doakes' father being a butcher. I was, however, taken by surprise in a huge way when Doakes showed up on the dock at the end of the episode. Holy. Crap." Television Without Pity gave the episode an "A" grade.

Lauren Vélez submitted this episode for consideration for Outstanding Supporting Actress in a Drama Series at the 60th Primetime Emmy Awards.
