= Sunset Beat =

- Genre: Crime drama
- Starring: George Clooney; Michael DeLuise; Markus Flanagan; Erik King; James Tolkan; Sydney Walsh; Arlene Golonka
- Country of origin: United States
- Original language: English
- No. of seasons: 1
- No. of episodes: 6

Production
- Running time: 60 minutes

Original release
- Network: ABC
- Release: April 21, 1990 – 1992

Sunset Beat is an American television drama series. It ran only two episodes on the ABC television network in 1990. The remaining four were broadcast on ABC in 1992.

The show centered around a group of Los Angeles Police Department officers working undercover as a motorcycle gang. They operate out of an abandoned fire station on Sunset Boulevard.

The theme, "Sunset Beat", was composed by Clink Productions.

== Cast of characters ==
- Officer Chris Chesbro – George Clooney
- Officer Tim Kelly – Michael DeLuise
- Officer Bradley Coolidge – Markus Flanagan
- Officer Tucson Smith – Erik King
- Captain Ray Parker – James Tolkan
- Holly Chesbro (Chris' ex-wife) – Sydney Walsh
- Harriet Parker (Ray's ex-wife) – Arlene Golonka

== Sources ==
- Terrace, Vincent (2008). "Sunset Beat". Encyclopedia of Television Shows, 1925 through 2007. Jefferson, North Carolina: McFarland & Co. ISBN 9780786433056.
