= The Rose Technique =

- The Rose Technique a.k.a. Deranged dvd cover
- Directed by: Jon C. Scheide
- Written by: Ray Stroeber
- Starring: JoBeth Williams; Sally Kirkland; Kari Wuhrer; Jason Brooks; Sage Kirkpatrick
- Cinematography: Mark Woods
- Music by: Ken Mazur
- Distributed by: Forsyth Films
- Release date: 1 March 2002
- Running time: 97 minutes
- Language: English

The Rose Technique, also known as Deranged, is a 2002 direct-to-DVD American film starring Sally Kirkland, JoBeth Williams, Kari Wuhrer, Jason Brooks and Sage Kirkpatrick.

== Plot ==
The Rose Technique revolves around the life of an off-beat psychiatrist who wants to join the crazy world of daytime TV. She signs a contract with a school and becomes a teacher, but a student tries to prove that she is no angel. Strange things happen while the psychiatrist Doctor Lillian Rose is around.

== Cast ==
- JoBeth Williams as Dr. Lillian Rose
- Sally Kirkland as Helen
- Kari Wuhrer as Kristi
- Jason Brooks as Eddie
- Sage Kirkpatrick as Emily
- Denice Duff as Sally Winward
- Leo Rossi as Artie
- Robert Costanzo as Vince Trane
- Anicka Haywood as Brandy
- Peter Jason as Detective Atwood
- Nicolas Read as Jake
- Gibby Brand as Dr. Pierce
- Kevin Brief as Radio Station Manager

== Reception ==
Kevin Thomas of the Los Angeles Times said that writer Ray Stroeber had a promising idea, but that director Jon Scheide played the dark comedy too straight, and that the film fails to match the audacious performance from Williams.
