= British Invasion (car show) =

Annual British car show

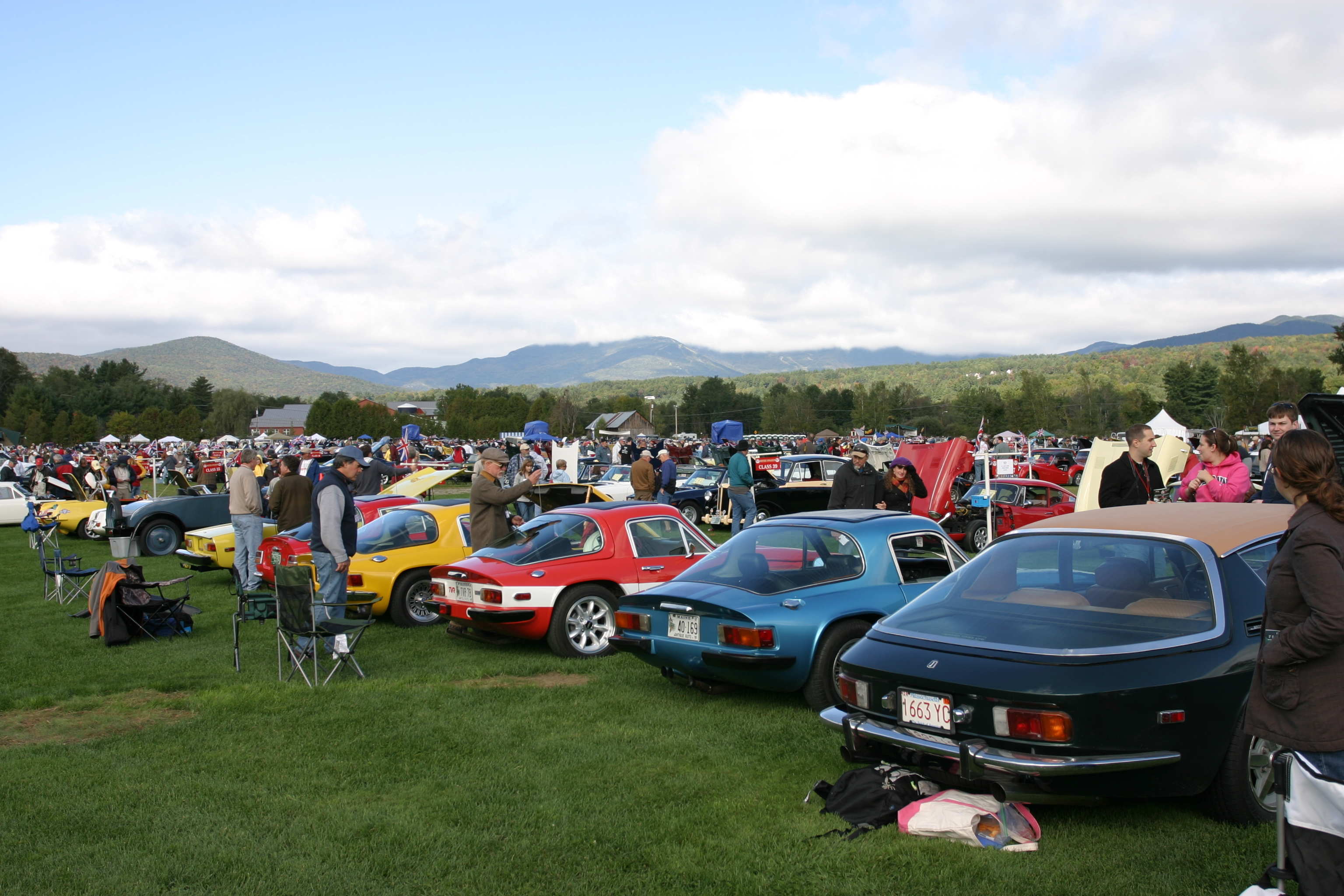
A portion of the show field at British Invasion XIX (2009)

British Invasion is an annual British automobile show and cultural celebration held in Stowe, Vermont. It was created to celebrate classic British cars. The multiple events that comprise British Invasion take place over several days during the third weekend of September. Events of the weekend include a driving tour of Lake Champlain islands, a driving tour of Smuggler's Notch, Concours d'Elegance judging, and a tailgating competition with themed picnic lunches.

The main car show, held on Saturday, uses a field just north of the center of town, and runs from morning until evening. Show cars are divided into approximately sixty categories and organized by marque when parked on the field.

== History ==
In October 1989, Michael Gaetano and Chris Francis (proprietor of the town's Ye Olde England Inne) discussed the possibility of inviting members of British car clubs to Stowe for an event. After receiving positive response from clubs and interest from corporate sponsors, the date of the first British Invasion was set for September 1991. The event became popular and regularly attracts over 600 British cars for display. The location differs each year but always remains around the town of Stowe. The majority of cars on display tend to be MG Rovers.

The availability of British cars is dependent on American customs regulations that state that only cars older than 25 years old are able to be imported into the United States and driven, whereas for Canada it is older than 15 years. The rolling restriction allows for newer and different cars to be imported from the United Kingdom each year.
