= Don McManus =

American actor

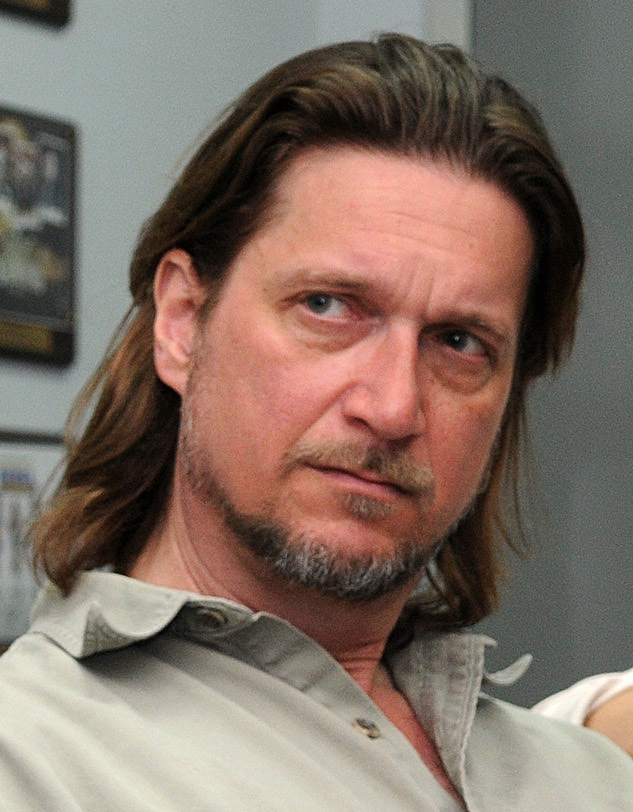
- McManus at Camp As Sayliyah, Qatar, in 2009
- Born: San Diego, California, U.S.
- Other name: Don R. McManus
- Education: Yale University

Don McManus (sometimes credited as Don R. McManus) is an American actor. Born in San Diego, California, he is a graduate of Yale University.

== Selected filmography ==
=== Film ===
Year	Title	Role	Notes
1987	The Care Bears Adventure in Wonderland	Caterpillar (voice)	
1990	The Bonfire of the Vanities	Bondsman	
1991	True Colors	Doug Stubblefield	
1993	Josh and S.A.M.	Calgary Airline Officer	
1994	The Shawshank Redemption	Guard Wiley	
1997	Air Force One	F-15 Leader Colonel Carlton	
1998	I'm Losing You	Jake Horowitz	
1998	Zack and Reba	Reverend Poole	
1999	Magnolia	Dr. Landon	
2000	Dropping Out	Mr. Flemington	
2000	The 6th Day	RePet Salesman	
2001	Hannibal	Benny Holcombe	
2002	Punch-Drunk Love	Plastic Voice (voice)	
2002	Auto Focus	Priest	
2003	Under the Tuscan Sun	Nasty Man	
2004	National Treasure	Stan Herbert	
2005	Underclassman	Julian Reynolds	
2007	Ocean's Thirteen	Neil, The Pit Boss	
2007	Choose Connor	Daniel Norris	
2008	The Onion Movie	Dennis McCormick	
2008	The Coverup	Carl Rauff	
2008	Killshot	Nelson Davies	
2009	Kill Theory	Karl Truftin	
2009	Just Peck	Mr. Trustman	
2009	Cirque du Freak: The Vampire's Assistant	Mr. Shan	
2009	Little Fish, Strange Pond	Dennis Rivers	
2011	Letters from the Big Man	Forest Superintendent	
2011	Low Fidelity	Dick	
2012	For a Good Time, Call...	Scott Powell	
2013	Lovelace	Arty Shapiro	
2013	The Congress	Reeve Bobs	Uncredited
2013	Dark Around the Stars	Brian	
2013	Grand Piano	Norman Reisinger	
2014	Under the Hollywood Sign	Robert	
2014	The Perfect 46	Steve Heisman	
2014	Lucky Bastard	Mike	
2014	The Maze Runner	Masked Man	
2015	Grandma	Dad	
2015	Park City	Charley	
2015	Paranormal Activity: The Ghost Dimension	Kent	
2018	Under the Silver Lake	Final Man	
2018	Vice	David Addington	

=== Television ===
Year	Title	Role	Notes
1987	The Equalizer	Dr. Feinberg	Episode: "Christmas Presence"
1994	Seinfeld	Duncan Meyer	Episode: "The Race"
1998–1999	Any Day Now	Graham Pearce	10 Episodes
2003	Malcolm in the Middle	Charles Cutler	Episode: "Malcolm Films Reese"
2004	Frasier	Donald	Episode: "Caught in the Act"
2007	Ben 10: Race Against Time	Carl Tennyson	Television film
2007	Dexter	Roger Hicks	Episode: "An Inconvenient Lie"
2008	Supernatural	Don Harding / Samhain	Episode: "It's the Great Pumpkin, Sam Winchester"
2008	Ben 10: Alien Force	Carl Tennyson (voice)	Episode: "Grounded"
2008	Psych	Carl	Episode: "Christmas Joy"
2012	The Mentalist	Gabriel Lamb	Episode: "Ruby Slippers"
2014–2015	Justified	Billy Geist	7 episodes
2014–2017	Mom	Steve Curtis	10 episodes
2023	The Rookie	Officer Chambers	Episode: "A Hole in the World"

=== Video games ===
Year	Title	Role	Notes
2015	Life Is Strange	David Madsen	
2015	Fallout 4	Wallace, John	
2017	Wolfenstein II: The New Colossus	Super Spesh	
