= Erik King =

American actor (born 1963)

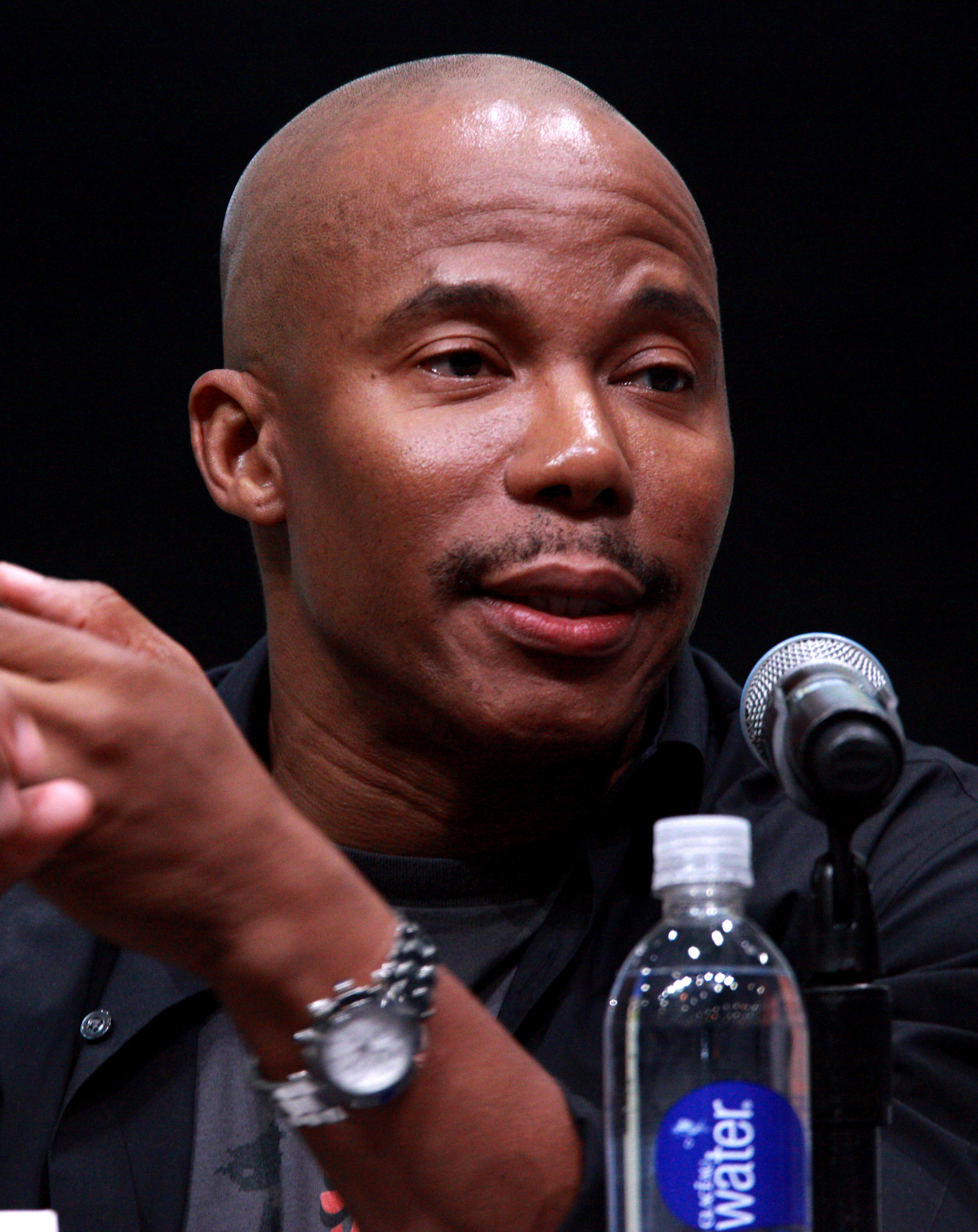
- King at San Diego Comic-Con in 2013
- Born: April 21, 1963 (age 63); Washington, D.C., U.S.
- Occupation: Actor
- Years active: 1983–present

Erik King (born April 21, 1963) is an American actor, best known for his portrayal of Sergeant James Doakes on Showtime's television series Dexter. He is also known for his role as Moses Deyell on Oz, and Bobby Davidson on Missing Persons, in addition to roles in the movies Casualties of War, National Treasure and True Crime.

== Early life and education ==
King, whose father was a policeman, attended The Duke Ellington High School of Performing Arts in Washington, D.C. and later attended Towson University in Baltimore, Maryland.

== Career ==
Early roles for King were in TV series such as Matlock, NYPD Blue and JAG. In 1990, he starred in the short-lived ABC police drama Sunset Beat. He appeared as Moses Deyell in HBO's television series Oz. Other episodic work includes Malcolm in the Middle, Charmed and CSI: Miami. King appeared on The District as Travis Hayward, as well as CBS' Touched by an Angel.

King has appeared in multiple feature films, including the adventure film National Treasure and the thriller Desperate Measures.

King's prominence rose with his role as police detective James Doakes in the Showtime TV series Dexter. He starred in 26 episodes from the pilot in 2006 to the last episode of Season 2 in 2007. He also reprised the role in a season 7 episode in 2012. For his portrayal as the main antagonist of the show, he received a Saturn Award nomination in 2008 for Best Supporting Actor on Television. He said of his role that:

What I love about Sgt. Doakes is that when you run into a cop, a lot of them are fair, even-minded guys; but there are a lot of guys who are hard-asses and I love the fact that I get to play it.

== Filmography ==
=== Film ===
| Year | Title | Role | Notes |
|---|---|---|---|
| 1987 | Street Smart | Reggie | |
| 1987 | Tomorrow's a Killer | Sullivan | |
| 1989 | Casualties of War | Brown | |
| 1990 | Cadillac Man | Davey | |
| 1990 | Sunset Beat | Tucson Smith | |
| 1992 | Stay Tuned | Pierce | |
| 1993 | Joey Breaker | Hip Hop Hank | |
| 1993 | The Pickle | Man with Beer | |
| 1997 | An Alan Smithee Film: Burn Hollywood Burn | Wayne Jackson | |
| 1998 | Desperate Measures | Nate Oliver | |
| 1999 | True Crime | Pussy Man | |
| 2000 | Things You Can Tell Just by Looking at Her | Police Officer | Segment: "Love Waits for Kathy" |
| 2004 | National Treasure | Agent Colfax | |
| 2005 | Ice Princess | Chip Healey | |
| 2011 | Born to Race | Briggs | Direct to video |
| 2018 | Vox Lux | | |

=== Television ===
| Year | Title | Role | Notes |
|---|---|---|---|
| 1983 | Kennedy | Young Black Man | Miniseries |
| 1986 | Spenser: For Hire | Louis Harper | Episode: "A Day's Wages" |
| 1989 | A Man Called Hawk | Street Brother | Episode: "Never My Love" |
| 1990 | Sunset Beat | Tucson Smith | Episode: "One Down, Four Up" |
| 1990 | Law & Order | Dorian "Silky" Ford | Episode: "Poison Ivy" |
| 1991 | Golden Years | Burton | Miniseries |
| 1992 | The Round Table | Wade Carter | 7 episodes |
| 1993–1994 | Missing Persons | Investigator Bobby Davison | 17 episodes |
| 1994 | M.A.N.T.I.S. | Justin Battle | Episode: "Fire in the Heart" |
| 1994 | Diagnosis: Murder | Tommy Brackett | Episode: "Standing Eight Count" |
| 1995 | Matlock | Ron Jaffe | Episode: "The Heist" |
| 1995 | The Invaders | Dr. Josh Webber | Miniseries |
| 1996 | Sliders | Young Singer | Season 2 Episode 8 |
| 1996 | NYPD Blue | Billy Stubbs | Episode: "Auntie Maimed" |
| 1996 | Kindred: The Embraced | Sonny Toussaint | 8 episodes |
| 1997 | JAG | Captain Henry Banes | Episode: "The Good of the Service" |
| 1998 | Any Day Now | Reggie Rhodes | Episode: "No Comment" |
| 1999 | Atomic Train | Beau Randall | Miniseries |
| 2000–2001 | Oz | Moses Deyell | 11 episodes |
| 2000–2001 | Touched by an Angel | Kevin Carter, Peter Lakes | 2 episodes |
| 2001 | The District | Travis Haywood | 3 episodes |
| 2002 | CSI: Miami | Detective Fenwick | Episode: "Just One Kiss" |
| 2002 | The Twilight Zone | Lenny | Episode: "The Pool Guy" |
| 2003 | Charmed | Dex | Episode: "The Importance of Being Phoebe" |
| 2004 | Malcolm in the Middle | Agent Stone | Episode: "Reese Joins the Army: Part 1" |
| 2006–2007 & 2012 | Dexter | Sgt. James Doakes | Season1-2Main Season7 1 episode |
| 2010 | Burn Notice | Bolo | Episode: "Noble Causes" |
| 2010 | Memphis Beat | Ron Funk | Episode: "Run On" |
| 2014 | Growing Up Fisher | Vice Principal Collins | Episode: "First Time's the Charm" |
| 2015 | South of Hell | DeMar | Episode: "South of the Border" |
| 2016 | Banshee | Dr. Tim Hubbard | 4 episodes |
| 2016 | Mistresses | Eliot Mead | 2 episodes |
| 2017 | The Detour | Harris | 2 episodes |
| 2019 | The Oath | Pastor Greg | 6 episodes |
| 2020 | The Good Fight | Jonah | 2 episodes |
| 2025 | Dexter: Resurrection | Sgt. James Doakes | Episode: "A Beating Heart..." |
| 2026 | Boston Blue | Crispus “Chris” Williams | Episodes: “L’dor V’dor” & |
