= Jaime Murray =

English actress (born 1976)

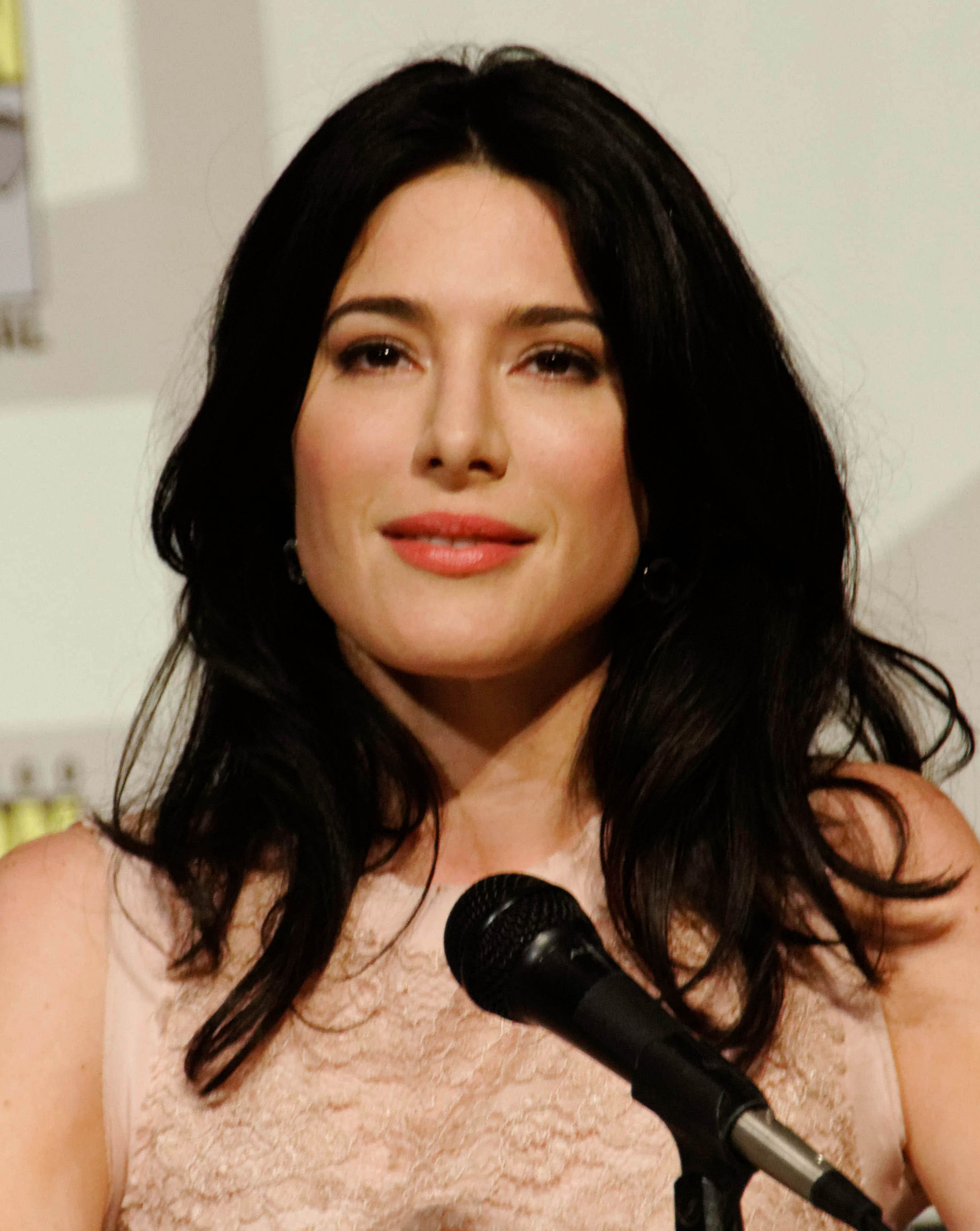
- Murray at the 2012 San Diego Comic-Con
- Born: Jaime Erica Murray; 21 July 1976 (age 50); Hammersmith, London, England
- Occupation: Actress
- Years active: 2001–present
- Spouse: Bernie Cahill (m. 2014)
- Father: Billy Murray

Jaime Erica Murray (born 21 July 1976) is an English actress. She is known for playing Stacie Monroe in the BBC series Hustle (2004–2012), Lila West in the Showtime series Dexter (2007), Gaia in the Starz miniseries Spartacus: Gods of the Arena (2011), Olivia Charles in The CW series Ringer (2011–2012), Helena G. Wells in the Syfy series Warehouse 13 (2010–2014), Stahma Tarr in the Syfy series Defiance (2013–2015), Fiona/the Black Fairy in the ABC series Once Upon a Time (2016–2017), Antoinette in The CW series The Originals (2018), and Nyssa al Ghul in Gotham (2019).

== Early life and education ==
Murray was born on 21 July 1976 in Hammersmith, London, England, to Elaine and Billy Murray. Just before taking her A levels, Murray was diagnosed with dyslexia. She briefly studied philosophy and psychology at the London School of Economics, but dropped out to train at the Drama Centre London, where she graduated in 2000.

== Career ==
Murray's first role was miming the lyrics in the original video of Stretch & Vern's dance track "I'm Alive" (1996). Some of her early television appearances included minor guest roles in BBC One's Casualty, The Bill, Love Soup, and ShakespeaRe-Told: The Taming of the Shrew.

In 2005, she played Ruth Kettering on the ITN television series Agatha Christie's Poirot (season 10, episode 1: "The Mystery of the Blue Train"), an adaptation of the 1928 novel The Mystery of the Blue Train, Agatha Christie’s sixth Hercule Poirot mystery novel.

Murray starred as Stacie Monroe in series 1–4 of Hustle. She reprised that role in the show's series 8.

Relocating to Los Angeles, Murray starred in Dexter as Lila West, Dexter Morgan's Narcotics Anonymous sponsor and the main antagonist in season two. In mid-2008, Murray joined the cast of The CW's series Valentine, playing the lead character, Grace Valentine. The show began airing in October 2008 but was cancelled by the end of the month. Murray was cast in another CW show, The Beautiful Life: TBL, as a wardrobe stylist, but the show was cancelled before she was able to appear.

Murray finished shooting Possessions in 2010 and soon thereafter began shooting The Rapture. She starred in the horror film Devil's Playground (2010), directed by Mark McQueen, and then appeared as Helena G. Wells on the Syfy series Warehouse 13. Murray's portrayal of Wells received critical praise and was described as "saucy", "superb", as able to "anchor a series" and "endlessly fascinating". Her absence as the villainess in the season-three Christmas episode, "The Greatest Gift", was bemoaned with the lamentation "she would have done it better". Murray was nominated for a 2012 Portal Award for her portrayal of Helena G. Wells on Warehouse 13.

Murray also made a guest appearances on the Fox series The Finder, where she played a drug co-ordinator. Murray starred in the Starz miniseries Spartacus: Gods of the Arena, as Gaia, a longtime friend of Lucretia's. Murray also had a guest appearance in 2009 on CBS series NCIS, playing ICE Agent Julia Foster-Yates.

Murray made an appearance on the Partially Examined Life philosophy podcast, playing a part in Sartre's No Exit, alongside Lucy Lawless, Mark Linsenmayer, and Wes Alwan.

From 2013, she portrayed the character of Stahma Tarr in the Syfy series Defiance, which aired its final episode in August 2015. Murray had a recurring role in the sixth season of Once Upon a Time as the Black Fairy.

She has recently been cast in the final season of The Originals as Antoinette, a vampire Elijah meets soon after losing his memories.

Murray also appeared in the fifth and final season of Gotham as Nyssa al Ghul.

Murray modelled clothing in television advertisements for Debenhams department store. She is signed to Models 1 in London and has appeared in men's magazines such as GQ, Mayfair, and FHM, as well as women's magazines such as Hello!, Cosmopolitan, and OK!.

== Personal life ==
Murray married Bernie Cahill, a partner in an entertainment management company, in May 2014.

== Filmography ==
Film
Year	Title	Role	Notes
2002	The Byzantine Cat	Jane Spencer (lead role)	
2005	Animal	Saleswoman	
2007	The Deaths of Ian Stone	Medea	
2007	Botched	Anna	
2010	Devil's Playground	Lavinia	
2010	The Rapture	Fiona	
2012	Possessions	Chloe	
2013	Samuel Bleak	Vivian Bleak	
2013	Fright Night 2: New Blood	Gerri Dandridge	Direct-to-video
2018	The Nanny	Leonor	

Television
Year	Title	Role	Notes
2001	The Bill	Tania Matthews	Episode: "A Pound of Flesh"
2002	Casualty	Sonia Guzman	Episode: "Thicker Than Water"
2002	The Bill	Melanie	3 episodes
2003	Keen Eddie	Kiki	Episode: "Pilot (a.k.a. Eddie)"
2004	Doctors and Nurses	Bella Olazabal	Episode: "Bella Bella"
2004–2012	Hustle	Stacie Monroe	Main cast (series 1–4, 8); 25 episodes
2005	Love Soup	Natalie Brown	Episode: "Death and Nurses"
2005	ShakespeaRe-Told	Bianca Minola	Episode: "The Taming of The Shrew"
2005	Agatha Christie's Poirot	Ruth Kettering	Episode: "The Mystery of the Blue Train"
2007	Dexter	Lila West	8 episodes
2007	Demons	Rebecca	1 episode
2008–2009	Valentine	Grace Valentine/Aphrodite	Main cast; 8 episodes
2009	The Mentalist	Nadia Sobell	Episode: "Carnelian Inc."
2009	Eli Stone	Diane Rundlet	Episode: "Flight Path"
2009	NCIS	ICE Agent Julia Foster-Yates	Episode: "Semper Fidelis"
2009	The Beautiful Life: TBL	Vivienne	5 episodes
2010–2014	Warehouse 13	Helena G. Wells	15 episodes
2011	Spartacus: Gods of the Arena	Gaia	Miniseries; 4 episodes
2011–2012	Ringer	Olivia Charles	10 episodes
2012	The Finder	Amadea Denaris	Episode: "An Orphan Walks Into a Bar"
2012	Childrens Hospital	Kitty Black	Episode: "British Hospital"
2013–2015	Defiance	Stahma Tarr	Main cast
2015	Sleepy Hollow	Carmilla Pines	Episode: "Kali Yuga"
2016–2017	Once Upon a Time	Fiona / the Black Fairy	Recurring role (8 episodes)
2018	The Originals	Antoinette	Recurring role (6 episodes)
2018	Midnight, Texas	Delilah	Recurring role (2 episodes)
2018–2021	Castlevania	Carmilla (voice)	Main cast (13 episodes)
2019	Gotham	Nyssa al Ghul / Theresa Walker	Recurring role (5 episodes)

Web
Year	Title	Role	Notes
2010	Suite 7	Jessy	Episode: "Good in Bed"
2012	Jan	Andie	4 episodes

Music videos
Year	Title	Artist
2012	"Goodbye in Her Eyes"	Zac Brown Band

Video games
Year	Title	Role	Notes
2014	Lichdom: Battlemage	Hedira	Voice role
