= William March =

United States Marine, novelist, short story writer (1893–1954)

- William March, c. 1933
- Born: September 18, 1893 (Note: There is some doubt about the exact year; the family bible and university records have 1894, but later March insisted that 1893 was the right date. See Simmonds (1984), p. 326.); Mobile, Alabama, US
- Died: May 15, 1954 (aged 60); New Orleans, Louisiana, US
- Occupations: Novelist; Short-story writer; U.S marine
- Writing career
- Genre: Psychological realism
- Movement: The Lost Generation

William March (September 18, 1893 – May 15, 1954) was an American writer of psychological fiction and a highly decorated U.S. Marine. The author of six novels and four short-story collections, March was praised by critics but never attained great popularity.

March grew up in rural Alabama in a family so poor that he could not finish high school, and he did not earn a high school equivalency until he was 20. He later studied law but was again unable to afford to finish his studies. In 1917, while working in a Manhattan law office, he volunteered for the U.S. Marine Corps and saw action in World War I, for which he was decorated with some of the highest honors—the French Croix de Guerre, the American Distinguished Service Cross, and the U.S. Navy Cross. After the war he again worked in a law office before embarking on a financially successful business career.

While working in business he began writing, first short stories, then in 1933 a novel based on his war experiences, Company K. His follow-up work was the "Pearl County" series, novels and short fiction set in his native south Alabama, the most successful of which is the novel The Looking-Glass. However, literary success eluded him. His last novel, The Bad Seed, was published in 1954, the year March died. It became a bestseller, but he never saw his story adapted first for the stage in 1954, and then for film in 1956, 1985, and 2018. March was one of twelve inaugural inductees to the Alabama Writers Hall of Fame on June 8, 2015.

== Early life ==
William March was born William Edward Campbell. His father worked as a "timber cruiser", estimating which stands of trees were big enough to warrant lumber companies investing in a saw mill in the area. He was the eldest son of eleven children (two of whom died in infancy) and grew up in and around Mobile, Alabama. His father was an occasional heavy drinker who had a fondness for reciting poetry (especially Edgar Allan Poe's) at the dinner table. His mother, whose maiden name was Susan March, was probably better educated and taught the children to read and write; in the eyes of her family, she had married beneath herself. Neither parent seemed to have supported young March's literary efforts; he later stated he had composed a 10,000 line poem at the age of 12 but had burned the manuscript. Having 8 other siblings, March was afforded no privileges, and by the time he was 14 the family moved to Lockhart, Alabama, preventing him from going to high school. (Lockhart would later become the imaginary Hodgetown, Pearl County, in March's novels Come in at the Door (1934) and The Tallons (1936).) Instead, March received occasional schooling, probably in one-room edifices then common in sawmill towns. He found employment in the office of a lumber mill.

Two years later March had returned to Mobile and found employment in a local law office. By 1913, he had saved enough money to take a high school course at Valparaiso University in Indiana, which allowed him to enroll at the University of Alabama to study law. He thrived as a student but could not afford the necessary tuition to complete his law degree. In the fall of 1916, he moved to New York. There he lived in a small boarding house in Brooklyn, found work as a clerk in the Manhattan law firm of Nevins, Brett and Kellog, and attended plays.

== World War I ==
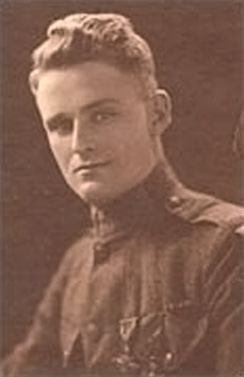
Military awards, c. 1918

On June 5, 1917, March registered for military service, a little over a month after the U.S. entered World War I. He volunteered for the U.S. Marines on July 25, and after completing his training on Parris Island was shipped to France in February 1918. Along with two other future World War I literary figures, John W. Thomason and Laurence Stallings), March embarked on USS Von Steuben at Philadelphia. He reached France in March 1918 and served as a sergeant in Co F, 2nd Battalion, 5th Marines, 4th Brigade of Marines, Second Division of the U.S. Army Expeditionary Force.

March's company took part in every major engagement in which American troops were involved, incurring heavy casualties. As a member of the 5th Marines, March saw his first action on the old Verdun battlefield near Les Éparges and shortly afterwards at Belleau Wood, where he was wounded in the head and shoulder. He returned to the front in time for the offensive at the battles of Soissons and Saint-Mihiel. March was twice promoted and had attained the rank of sergeant when he was assigned to French troops in the Blanc Mont area, on "statistical duties".

During the assault on Blanc Mont, which started on 3 October, March "left a shelter to rescue wounded". The next day, "during a counterattack, the enemy having advanced to within 300 meters of the first aid station, he immediately entered the engagement and though wounded refused to be evacuated until the Germans were thrown back". As a result of his actions, March received the French Croix de Guerre with Palm and the Army Distinguished Service Cross for valor (the Distinguished Service Cross is the second highest Army decoration, next only to the Medal of Honor). A curious detail emerges from the account of his war experiences that would find its way into his fiction: though it appears he was never gassed badly enough to be hospitalized for it, upon his return from the war he told people that he was and that he only had a short time to live; a number of characters in Company K suffer and die after mustard gas attacks. Roy Simmonds, March's biographer, locates the origin of what he calls the "two worlds of William March" (the title of his biography) in this period: throughout his life, March appears to have mixed reality with imagined memory, telling supposedly historical anecdotes that may not have been true. An experience March told a number of times included his jumping into a bomb crater to take shelter and coming face to face with a young German soldier, whom he instantly bayoneted; this anecdote also found its way into Company K.

=== Official citations ===
The official citation to the Croix de Guerre reads as follows:

During the operations in Blanc Mont region, October 3–4, 1918, he left a shelter to rescue the wounded. On October 5, during a counter-attack, the enemy having advanced to within 300 meters of the first aid station, he immediately entered the engagement and though wounded refused to be evacuated until the Germans were thrown back.

The citation for March's Distinguished Service Cross (under his birthname William E. Campbell) reads as follows:

The Distinguished Service Cross is presented to William E. Campbell, Sergeant, U.S. Marine Corps, for extraordinary heroism while serving with the 43d Company, 5th Regiment (Marines), 2d Division, A.E.F. in action near Blanc Mont, France, October 3–5, 1918. On October 3 and 4, while detailed on statistical work, Sergeant Campbell voluntarily assisted in giving first aid to the wounded. On October 5, when the enemy advanced within 300 yards of the dressing station, he took up a position in the lines, helping in defense. Although twice wounded, he remained in action under heavy fire until the enemy had been repulsed.

When the Navy Cross, the United States Navy's second highest award for valor after the Medal of Honor, was established in 1919, March received that award as well (326 Marines who had previously received the Army Distinguished Service Cross in World War I would receive the Navy Cross for the same action). March's citation for the Navy Cross reads similar to that for the Army Distinguished Service Cross.

The President of the United States of America takes pleasure in presenting the Navy Cross to Sergeant William E. Campbell (MCSN: 89685), United States Marine Corps, for extraordinary heroism while serving with the 43d Company, 5th Regiment (Marines), 2d Division, A.E.F. in action near Blanc Mont, France, October 3–5, 1918. On October 3 and 4, while detailed on statistical work, Sergeant Campbell voluntarily assisted in giving first aid to the wounded. On October 5 when the enemy advanced within 300 yards of the dressing station, he took up a position in the lines, helping in defense. Although twice wounded, he remained in action under heavy fire until the enemy had been repulsed.

== Literary aftermath of World War I ==
In 1919, March returned to civilian life but experienced bouts of anxiety and depression. The aforementioned experience, of having bayoneted a young, blond German soldier, is recounted in Company K and is there attributed to Private Manuel Burt; March suffered hysterical attacks at different moments in his life related to the throat and the eyes. He rarely spoke of his own war experiences or awards, though people noted that he was in the habit of always taking his medals with him, and on occasion he told war stories.

March stayed for a few weeks with his family in Tuscaloosa, Alabama, then found work at a law firm in Mobile. Soon, however, he became the personal secretary of John B. Waterman, of whose newly founded and quickly growing shipping company, the Waterman Steamship Corporation, he eventually became vice-president. In 1924, he was promoted to traffic manager. In 1926, the company opened an office in Memphis, Tennessee, which March supervised; he spent two years in Memphis and became involved in the local theater scene. All the while he traveled the country on business trips, often accompanied by his friend and business associate J.P. Case. This associate recalls that March's rooms were usually littered with papers and books, many of them on psychology: March was reading Alfred Adler, Sigmund Freud, and Carl Jung intensively. In 1928, March moved again, to New York, where he took creative writing classes at Columbia University and began writing short stories.

March settled on his nom de plume after sending out a number of different stories under different pseudonyms; the one that got published first decided his literary name. "The Holly Wreath" was his first publication; it appeared under the name of William March in The Forum, a literary magazine from New York, in September 1929. The Forum would publish more of his stories, as did Contempo: A Review of Books and Personalities, Prairie Schooner, and other literary magazines. His stories were included in two annual anthologies of short fiction, Edward O'Brien's The Best American Short Stories and the O. Henry Prize Stories, in 1930, 1931, and 1932. In all, he published some twenty stories; four of them were vignettes that were to be included in his first novel.

March finished his first novel, Company K, while living in New York; it was published in January 1933 by Harrison Smith & Robert Haas. Encompassing much of his war time experience, it was an instant success and went through three printings. By this time March was already living in Hamburg, Germany; he was now Waterman's senior traffic manager and was sent to Germany to help open up the European market. In Hamburg he finished his second novel, Come in at the Door, his first novel of the "Pearl County" series of novels and short stories, set in the mythical towns of Hodgetown, Baycity, and Reedyville. Also in Hamburg he witnessed the rise of Adolf Hitler and the Nazi regime and wrote a prophetic short story, "Personal Letter", which expressed anxiety over the political future of Germany and the world. March was fearful of publishing the story, as he was already well-established as an anti-militarist author and was afraid to place his German friends and associates in undue peril. It was later published in Trial Balance: The Collected Short Stories of William March.

Two years later, following a move to London, March finished his third novel, The Tallons, the second in his "Pearl County" series. Reviews in the UK were generally positive, more so than in the United States. Psychological problems that had already bothered him in Germany worsened in London, and he became a patient of psychoanalyst Edward Glover, who was able to cure March's throat paralysis, diagnosing it as a hysterical condition. (March dedicated The Tallons to him, "as a slight recompense for the gray hairs I have put in his head".) While in London March became acquainted with a number of literary characters, leaving more of his Waterman work to his subordinates. In 1937, he returned to the US and within two years resigned his position to concentrate more on his writing, which by then was a full-time occupation; he had been paid partly in stock and could live well off the dividends. 1937, Simmonds notes, was an important year: it marked the high point of his productivity as a short-story writer, and the magazine The American Mercury took up Company K for a reprinting. In 1943, he completed his most ambitious and critically acclaimed novel, The Looking-Glass, the final book in his "Pearl County" series; Bert Hitchcock, literature professor at Auburn, called it March's "finest literary achievement".

== Later years ==
Harcourt published a March collection, Trial Balance: The Collected Short Stories of William March, in 1945, and according to Marjorie Farber, in The Kenyon Review, the stories pack "big ideas...elaborately in tiny anecdotal satires". March, she says, is "the dramatist of ideas, titles, puns--a comedian's Comedian, bearing perhaps the same relation to fiction as Stevens bears to poetry. But all the same it's astonishing what variety of quiet desperation and low misery and high comedy he manages to encompass in this book. Let's skip his defects, shall we? I haven't nearly room enough for all his virtues."

This critical acclaim notwithstanding, in 1947, after years of depression from his experiences in the war and a continuing bout of writer's block, March suffered a nervous breakdown. He briefly returned to Mobile to recuperate and made many return visits to New York to settle his affairs. On one such visit in 1949, March happened upon the gallery of New York art dealer Klaus Perls, which proved to be a turning point in March's life. Perls, accustomed to dealing with creative personalities, accepted March in a way March had not experienced since his days of therapy in London. Through Perls, March was able to talk openly about his creative process, using Perls as a sounding board for his ideas. Perls also introduced March to a world of other artists. In the works of Pablo Picasso and particularly those of Chaïm Soutine, March found a kinship and connection, as March and Soutine both displayed paranoid and schizophrenic tendencies. March returned Perls' friendship with a steady acquisition of works by Soutine, Joseph Glasco, Picasso, and Georges Rouault. He continued this friendship with routine visits to New York between 1949 and 1953, until ailing health prevented him from further travels.

In late 1950, March permanently left Mobile and purchased a Creole cottage on Dumaine Street in the French Quarter of New Orleans. It was here that he composed his last two novels, October Island (1952) and The Bad Seed (1954). March viewed the latter novel as a meager accomplishment, but it gained the most praise and success of any of his novels, (Note: March had already died by the time Patrick F. Quinn, in a review of the novel in The Hudson Review, published his praise of March as an example of an apparently "relatively tame, almost old-fashioned writer" who nonetheless could "renovate" the novel without resorting to "gimmicks".) selling more than a million copies in one year, launching a long-running Broadway hit penned by the Pulitzer Prize-winning playwright Maxwell Anderson and an eponymous 1956 movie directed by Mervyn LeRoy.

== Death ==
On March 25, 1954, March suffered a mild heart attack and was still recovering when The Bad Seed was published on April 8; he was able to read many of the book's positive reviews. He was discharged from the hospital on April 24, but on the night of May 15, 1954, he died in his sleep of a second and more severe heart attack, at age 60.

On the morning of March's death, the following paragraph was discovered in his typewriter. Entitled "Poor Pilgrim, Poor Stranger", it was presumably written after his discharge from the hospital (his biographer Simmonds surmises it might have been from a book March was working on), and reads:

The time comes in the life of each of us when we realize that death awaits us as it awaits others, that we will receive at the end neither preference nor exemption. It is then, in that disturbed moment, that we know life is an adventure with an ending, not a succession of bright days that go on forever. Sometimes the knowledge comes with the repudiation and quick revolt that such injustice awaits us, sometimes with fear that dries the mouth and closes the eyes for an instant, sometimes with servile weariness, an acquiescence more dreadful than fear. The knowledge that my own end was near came with pain, and afterwards astonishment, with the conventional heart attack, from which, I've been told, I've made an excellent recovery.

== Literary works ==
March's novels are psychological character studies that intertwine his own personal torment—deriving presumably from childhood trauma as well as from his war experiences—with the conflicts spawned by class, family, sexual, and racial matters. March's characters, through no fault of their own, tend to be victims of chance. He writes that freedom can only be obtained by being true to one's nature and humanity.

Commenting on March's complete body of work, British-American journalist and broadcaster Alistair Cooke wrote that March was "the most underrated of all contemporary American writers of fiction", citing the author's unique style as "classic modern" and stating that March was "the unrecognized genius of our time." Cooke himself championed the anthology A William March Omnibus, which was published two years after March died. In 2009, only The Bad Seed and Company K were still in print. (Note: When Philip Butcher reviewed Roy Simmonds's biography in 1985, he noted that only Company K was in print; however, The Bad Seed was republished in 1997 by Ecco Press, with an edition by Elaine Showalter, an edition republished in 2005 by Harper Perennial.) In 2015, the University of Alabama Press returned to print the three novels in the Pearl County series: Come in at the Door, The Tallons, and The Looking-Glass.

=== Novels ===
==== Company K ====
Company K, published in 1933, was hailed as a masterpiece by critics and writers alike and has often been compared to Erich Maria Remarque's classic anti-war novel All Quiet on the Western Front for its hopeless view of war. University of Alabama professor of American literature and author Philip Beidler wrote, in his introduction to a republication of the book in 1989, that March's "act of writing Company K, in effect reliving his very painful memories, was itself an act of tremendous courage, equal to or greater than whatever it was that earned him the Distinguished Service Cross, Navy Cross and French Croix de Guerre." Contemporary critics praised the powerful effect of March's novel technique of multiple points of view; already in 1935 (in an essay on new techniques in the novel), John Frederick wrote in The English Journal, "The cumulative effect... is one of the most powerful and memorable to be found in the whole range of writing about the war." In 2004, Alabama filmmaker Robert Clem made a feature adaptation of the novel; the movie attracted local interest. The novel has garnered attention as a World War I classic in other languages also: in 1967 it was translated into Italian for editor Longanesi as "Fuoco!" ("Fire!") and in 2008, it was translated into Dutch and published in a series called "The Library of the First World War."

==== The Bad Seed ====
The Bad Seed, published in April 1954, was a critical and commercial success, and introduced Rhoda Penmark, an eight-year-old sociopath and burgeoning serial killer. The novel became an instant bestseller and was widely praised by critics for its use of suspense and horror. James Kelley writes, for The New York Times Book Review, "The Bad Seed scores a direct hit, either as exposition of a problem or as a work of art. Venturing a prediction and a glance over the shoulder: no more satisfactory novel will be written in 1954 or has turned up in recent memory." Although March lived long enough to see the critical praise bestowed upon the novel and hear of its commercial success, he died before the novel's full impact became apparent. Referring to the author's repressed homosexuality, cultural historian Foster Hirsch opines that in this novel's "incendiary melodrama, March transferred his own hidden sexuality into the story of the bad seed...a child who kills and who has inherited her evil nature from her grandmother, a serial murderer." Hirsch goes on to observe that March's story raises the question—in the mid-1950s: "is homosexuality determined at birth, or is it caused by environmental conditions such as an overbearing mother and an absent father?"

It went on to sell more than a million copies, was nominated for the 1955 National Book Award for Fiction, adapted into a successful and long-running Broadway play by Maxwell Anderson, and was adapted for film three times, in 1956 (directed by Mervyn LeRoy), in 1985 (directed by Paul Wendkos), and in 2018 (directed by and starring Rob Lowe).

=== Short prose ===
March was an accomplished short story writer and published four collections of stories. The Filipino poet and critic José García Villa regarded March as "the greatest short story writer America has produced." He won four O. Henry Awards for his short stories, tied for the most wins by any author up until that time. Trial Balance: The Collected Short Stories of William March collects many of March's short stories from his entire career. The book was published in 1987 by the University of Alabama Press, with an introduction by Rosemary Canfield-Reisman. None of March's story collections is currently in print.

A little book with a March story, "The First Sunset", was printed in a limited edition of 150 copies by Cincinnati printer and writer Robert Lowry's Little Man Press.

==== 99 Fables ====
Six years after March's death, his 99 Fables were published by the University of Alabama Press. March's fables follow those of Aesop: according to a review in The New York Times Book Review, "Mr. March ... has picked up where Aesop and Don Marquis left off." Allen King, however, reviewing the book for the South Atlantic Bulletin, said the fables are "platitudinous" and offer no new insights into the nature of man. The cover won an award at the 1960 Southern Books Competition; the book is not currently in print.

== Biographical studies ==
=== The Two Worlds of William March ===
Of paramount importance to scholars is Roy S. Simmonds's 1984 "definitive biography of March", The Two Worlds of William March. Simmonds continued the work of his friend Lawrence William Jones, who had been working on a March biography but died in a car accident. Simmonds had only a passing knowledge of March's writing, but became increasingly interested in finishing Jones' work after having read through many of the papers that Jones had left behind, notably the 43-page memoir "Bill March" by New Orleans journalist Clint Bolton.

Although March had intimated that he wished for no biography to be written, the Campbell family, after having read the completed manuscript, gave their approval, though grudgingly, it seems. The biography received positive reviews, with one reviewer calling it "a critical study that is a judicious record of March's life and a fine tribute to his literary achievement", and closes on a note of praise:

The cruel irony of his death, coming at the moment it did, deprived him of the immense satisfaction of the worldwide recognition he would have enjoyed following the success of The Bad Seed. Now March has been almost forgotten. His reputation, however, if little known at present, remains established and secure. Those of us who know, love, and admire his work live in the belief that one day March will be recognized as one of the most remarkable, talented, and shamefully neglected writers that America has produced in this or in any other century.

Complementing the biography, Simmonds also published William March: An Annotated Checklist, an annotated bibliography of primary and secondary documents pertaining to March's life and work.

=== William March/Company K ===
Robert Clem's documentary film on March, entitled William March/Company K (2004), includes excerpts from Clem's feature adaptation of Company K and focuses on the effects of March's painful war experience on his later life. The documentary was shown at Birmingham, Alabama's Sidewalk Moving Picture Festival and aired on PBS in 2004.

== Honors and awards ==
=== Military awards ===
- French Croix de Guerre with Palm, 1918
- U.S. Distinguished Service Cross, 1918
- U.S. Navy Cross, 1918

=== Literary awards ===
- "The Little Wife" included in The Best American Short Stories and O. Henry Prize Stories, 1930
- "Fifteen from Company K" included in O. Henry Prize Stories, 1931
- "A Sum in Addition" included in O. Henry Prize Stories, 1936
- "Maybe the Sun Will Shine" included in The Best American Short Stories, 1937
- "The Last Meeting" included in O. Henry Prize Stories, 1937
- "The Female of the Fruit Fly" included in The Best American Short Stories, 1944
- The Bad Seed, National Book Award nomination, 1955

== Bibliography ==
=== Novels ===
- Company K. New York: Smith and Haas. 1933.
  - Republished, intr. John W. Aldridge, Company K. New York: Arbor House. 1984. ISBN 0-87795-647-2.
  - Republished, ed. and intr. Philip Beidler, Company K. Tuscaloosa: U of Alabama P. 1989. ISBN 0-8173-0480-0.
- Come in at the Door. New York: Smith and Haas. 1934.
- The Tallons. New York: Random House. 1936.
- The Looking-Glass. Boston: Little, Brown. 1943.
- October Island. Boston/London: Little, Brown/Gollancz. 1952.
- The Bad Seed. New York: Rinehart. 1954.
  - Republished, intr. Elaine Showalter, The Bad Seed: A Novel. Hopewell: Ecco Press. 1997.
  - Republished, intr. Elaine Showalter, The Bad Seed: A Novel. New York: Harper Perennial. 2005. ISBN 9780060795481.

=== Collections ===
- The Little Wife and Other Stories. New York: Smith and Haas. 1935.
- Some Like Them Short. Boston: Little, Brown. 1939.
- Trial Balance: The Collected Short Stories of William March. New York: Harcourt, Brace. 1945. ISBN 0-8173-0372-3.
  - 1970 republication, Trial Balance: The Collected Short Stories of William March. Westport: Greenwood. 1970. ISBN 0-8371-3221-5.
  - 1987 republication, Canfield-Reisman, Rosemary M., ed. (1987). Trial Balance: The Collected Short Stories of William March. Tuscaloosa: U of Alabama P. ISBN 0-8173-0372-3.
- Cooke, Alistair, ed. (1956). A William March Omnibus. New York: Rinehart.
- Going, William T., ed. (1960). 99 Fables. Tuscaloosa: U of Alabama P.

=== Films based on March's works ===
- The Bad Seed (directed by Mervyn LeRoy, 1956)
- The Bad Seed (directed by Paul Wendkos, 1985)
- Company K (directed by Robert Clem, 2004)
- The Bad Seed (directed by Rob Lowe, 2018)
