= Trial Balance: The Collected Short Stories of William March =

- First edition
- Author: William March
- Language: English
- Publisher: Harcourt, Brace and Company
- Publication date: 1945
- Publication place: United States
- Media type: Print (hardback & paperback)
- Pages: 506 pp
- Preceded by: The Looking-Glass (1943)
- Followed by: October Island (1952)

Trial Balance: The Collected Short Stories of William March is a collection of short stories by American author William March, first published in 1945 by Harcourt, Brace and Company. The 55 stories span almost the entirety of March's entire career until then, from 1929 to 1945.

Reviews were plentiful and positive; Roy S. Simmonds lists 31 reviews in his William March: An Annotated Checklist. Among the more notable reviewers are Alistair Cooke, who, in his review of the book in The New Republic, famously claimed that March "is understandably the most underrated of all contemporary American writers of fiction." Marjorie Farber, in The Kenyon Review, claims to be "greatly under the spell of William March" and states that the collection presents an "astonishing...variety of quiet desperation and low misery and high comedy."

The collection was republished twice: in 1970 by Greenwood, and in 1987 by the University of Alabama Press, with an introduction by Rosemary M. Canfield-Reisman. It is not currently in print.

== Editions ==
- Trial Balance: The Collected Short Stories of William March. New York: Harcourt, Brace and Company. 1945. ISBN 0-8173-0372-3.
- Republished, Trial Balance: The Collected Short Stories of William March. Westport: Greenwood. 1970. ISBN 0-8371-3221-5.
- Republished, intr. Rosemary M. Canfield-Reisman, Trial Balance: The Collected Short Stories of William March. Tuscaloosa: University of Alabama Press. 1987. pp. 506 + xxiii. ISBN 0-8173-0372-3.
