= Company K =

1933 novel by William March

- Author: William March
- Language: English
- Genre: Novel
- Publisher: Smith and Haas (USA) & Victor Gollancz Limited (UK)
- Publication date: January 1933 (USA) & March 1933 (UK)
- Publication place: United States
- Media type: Print (hardback & paperback)
- Pages: 260 pp
- ISBN: 978-0-8173-0480-5
- OCLC: 20220797
- Dewey Decimal: 813/.54 20
- LC Class: PS3505.A53157 C6 1989
- Followed by: Come in at the Door

Company K is a 1933 novel by William March, first serialised in parts in the New York magazine The Forum from 1930 to 1932, and published in its entirety by Smith and Haas on 19 January 1933, in New York. The book's title was taken from the Marine company that March served in during World War I. It has been regarded as one of the most significant works of literature to come out of the American World War I experience, and it is the most reprinted of all March's work.

== Plot summary ==
The novel comprises 113 vignettes about World War I Marines in Company K. The novel is told from the viewpoint of 113 different Marines, stretching from the beginning of training to after the war. These sketches create contrasting and horrific accounts of the daily life endured by the common Marine. Many of the accounts stem from actual events witnessed and experienced by the author.

It has often been described as an anti-militarist and an anti-war novel, but March maintained that the content was based on truth and should be viewed as an affirmation of life.

== Literary significance & criticism ==
Writer and literary critic for the Spectator Graham Greene places it among the most important of all war novels:

"His book has the force of a mob-protest; an outcry from anonymous throats. The wheel turns and turns and it does not matter, one hardly notices that the captain of the company, killed on page 159, is alive again a hundred pages later. It does not matter that every stock situation of the war, suicide, the murder of an officer, the slaughter of prisoners, a vision of Christ, is apportioned to Company K, because the book is not written in any realistic convention. It is the only War-book I have read which has found a new form to fit the novelty of the protest. The prose is bare, lucid, without literary echoes, not an imitation but a development of eighteenth-century prose."

The journalist and writer Christopher Morley had an almost identical response to Company K after reading an advance copy:

"It's queer about this book—it suddenly made me wonder whether any other book about the War has been written in this country. It's a book of extra-ordinary courage—not the courage of hope but the quiet courage of despair. It will make patriots and romanticists angry—yet it is the kind of patriotism that is hardest and toughest. It ranks at once with the few great cries of protest. It is a selected, partial, bitter picture, but a picture we need. It will live. None of the acts of bravery for which the author was decorated during the War was as brave as this anthology of dismay."

Company K has often been compared to Erich Maria Remarque's classic anti-war novel "All Quiet on the Western Front" for its despairing view of war. University of Alabama professor and author Philip Beidler wrote in his introduction to the 1989 republication of the novel:

"the act of writing Company K, in effect reliving his very painful memories, was itself an act of tremendous courage, equal to or greater than whatever it was that earned him the Distinguished Service Cross, Navy Cross and French Croix de Guerre".

Years after the completion of Company K, Ernest Hemingway published Men At War: The Best War Stories of All Time. In the introduction Hemingway notes that of all the stories in the book, the two he most desired to publish were omitted, Andre Malraux's Man's Fate and William March's Nine Prisoners, one of the original serialized excerpts from Company K. Hemingway states that the anti-war aspects of the stories would not bode well, as the novel coincides with the beginnings of World War II. He further states:

"Since the military problem, which was by no means clearly presented in the story, will undoubtedly arise many times in this war, I thought the story should be omitted from this book for the duration of the war. After the war, if a new edition of this book is published, I should strongly advise that the story be included."

== Publication information ==
- 1933, USA, Smith and Haas, Publication date 19 January 1933, hardback
- 1933, UK, Victor Gollancz Limited, 20 March 1933, hardback
- 1952, USA, Lion Books, November 1952, hardback
- 1955, USA, Lion Books, December 1955, hardback
- 1957, USA, Sagamore Press Inc., 1957, paperback
- 1958, USA, Signet Books, May 1958, paperback
- 1959, UK, Transworld Publishers, 4 February 1959, paperback
- 1959, ITL, Longanesi & Company, 1959, paperback (ITL edition as Fuoco!)
- 1965, UK, Transworld Publishers, 1965, paperback
- 1968, UK, Transworld Publishers, 1968, paperback
- 1976, UK, Thomas Nelson & Sons Ltd., Pub date 1976, hardback
- 1984, USA, Arbor House, Pub date 1984, paperback
- 1989, USA, The University of Alabama Press, 1989, paperback

== Adaptations ==
A film adaptation of the same name was made in 2004. It was written and directed by Robert Clem and starred Ari Filakos.
