= Teaching method =

Principles and methods used by teachers to enable student learning

A teaching method is a set of principles and methods used by teachers to enable student learning. These strategies are determined partly by the subject matter to be taught, partly by the relative expertise of the learners, and partly by constraints caused by the learning environment. For a particular teaching method to be appropriate and efficient it has to take into account the learner, the nature of the subject matter, and the type of learning it is supposed to bring about.

The approaches for teaching can be broadly classified into teacher-centered and student-centered, but in practice teachers will often adapt instruction by moving back and forth between these methodologies depending on learner prior knowledge, learner expertise, and the desired learning objectives. In a teacher-centered approach to learning, teachers are the main authority figure in this model. Students are viewed as "empty vessels" whose primary role is to passively receive information (via lectures and direct instruction) with the end goal of testing and assessment. It is the primary role of teachers to pass knowledge and information on to their students. In this model, teaching and assessment are viewed as two separate entities. Student learning is measured through objectively scored tests and assessments. In student-centered learning, while teachers are the authority figure in this model, teachers and students play an equally active role in the learning process. This approach is also called authoritative. The teacher's primary role is to coach and facilitate student learning and overall comprehension of material. Student learning is measured through both formal and informal forms of assessment, including group projects, student portfolios, and class participation. Teaching and assessments are connected; student learning is continuously measured during teacher instruction.

== Methods of teaching ==
=== Lecturing ===
The lecture method is just one of several teaching methods, though in schools it is usually considered the primary one. The lecture method is convenient for the institution and cost-efficient, especially with larger classroom sizes. This is why lecturing is the standard for most college courses when there can be several hundred students in the classroom at once; lecturing lets professors address the most people at once, in the most general manner, while still conveying the information that they feel is most important, according to the lesson plan. While the lecture method gives the instructor or teacher chances to expose students to unpublished or not readily available material, the students play a passive role which may hinder learning. While this method facilitates large-class communication, the lecturer must make a constant and conscious effort to become aware of student problems and engage the students to give verbal feedback. It can be used to arouse interest in a subject provided the instructor has effective writing and speaking skills.

=== Peer Instruction ===
Developed by Eric Mazur, peer instruction is a teaching method designed to improve the lecture. It includes both pre-class and in-class workflows. The in-class workflow intersperses teacher presentations with conceptual questions, called Concept Tests. These are designed to expose common student misconceptions in understanding the material, and lead to student discussion then reteaching if required.

=== Explaining ===
While under-researched, both student and teacher explanations remain one of the most utilized teaching methods in teacher practice. Explaining has many sub-categories including the use of analogies to build conceptual understanding. Some modes of explaining include the 'thinking together' style where teachers connect student ideas to scientific models. There are also more narrative styles using examples, and learner explanations which require students to give an explanation of the concept to be learned allowing the teacher to give precise feedback on the quality of the explanation.

=== Demonstrating ===
Demonstrating, which is also called the coaching style or the Lecture-cum-Demonstration method, is the process of teaching through examples or experiments. The framework mixes the instructional strategies of information imparting and showing how. For example, a science teacher may teach an idea by experimenting with students. A demonstration may be used to prove a fact through a combination of visual evidence and associated reasoning.

Demonstrations are similar to written storytelling and examples in that they allow students to personally relate to the presented information. Memorization of a list of facts is a detached and impersonal experience, whereas the same information, conveyed through demonstration, becomes personally relatable. Demonstrations help to raise student interest and reinforce memory retention because they provide connections between facts and real-world applications of those facts. Lectures, on the other hand, are often geared more towards factual presentation than connective learning.

One of the advantages of the demonstration method involves the capability to include different formats and instruction materials to make the learning process engaging. This leads to the activation of several of the learners' senses, creating more learning opportunities. The approach is also beneficial on the part of the teacher because it is adaptable to both group and individual teaching. While demonstration teaching, however, can be effective in teaching Math, Science, and Art, it can prove ineffective in a classroom setting that calls for the accommodation of the learners' individual needs.

=== Collaborating ===
Collaboration allows students to actively participate in the learning process by talking with each other and listening to others opinions. There exist some actions such as Dialogic Literary Gatherings and Interactive Groups which improve learnings by the collaboration and dialogic communication between the participants. Collaboration establishes a personal connection between students and the topic of study and it helps students think in a less personally biased way. Group projects and discussions are examples of this teaching method. Teachers may employ collaboration to assess student's abilities to work as a team, leadership skills, or presentation abilities.

Collaborative discussions can take a variety of forms, such as fishbowl discussions. It is important for teachers to provide students with instruction on how to collaborate effectively. This includes teaching them rules to conversation, such as listening, and how to use argumentation versus arguing. After some preparation and with clearly defined roles, a discussion may constitute most of a lesson, with the teacher only giving short feedback at the end or in the following lesson.

Some examples of collaborative learning tips and strategies for teachers are; to build trust, establish group interactions, keeps in mind the critics, include different types of learning, use real-world problems, consider assessment, create a pre-test, and post-test, use different strategies, help students use inquiry and use technology for easier learning.

==== Classroom discussion ====
The most common type of collaborative method of teaching in a class is classroom discussion. It is also a democratic way of handling a class, where each student is given equal opportunity to interact and put forth their views. A discussion taking place in a classroom can be either facilitated by a teacher or by a student. A discussion could also follow a presentation or a demonstration. Class discussions can enhance student understanding, add context to academic content, broaden student perspectives, highlight opposing viewpoints, reinforce knowledge, build confidence, and support community in learning. The opportunities for meaningful and engaging in-class discussion may vary widely, depending on the subject matter and format of the course. Motivations for holding planned classroom discussion, however, remain consistent. An effective classroom discussion can be achieved by probing more questions among the students, paraphrasing the information received, using questions to develop critical thinking with questions like "Can we take this one step further?;" "What solutions do you think might solve this problem?;" "How does this relate to what we have learned about..?;" "What are the differences between ... ?;" "How does this relate to your own experience?;" "What do you think causes .... ?;" "What are the implications of .... ?"

It is clear from "the impact of teaching strategies on learning strategies in first-year higher education cannot be overlooked nor over interpreted, due to the importance of students' personality and academic motivation which also partly explain why students learn the way they do" that Donche agrees with the previous points made in the above headings but he also believes that student's personalities contribute to their learning style. The way a student interprets and executes the instruction given by a teacher allows them to learn in a more effective and personal way. This interactive instruction is designed for the students to share their thoughts about a wide range of subjects.

Class discussions have also proven to be an effective method of bullying prevention and intervention when teachers discuss the issue of bullying and its negative consequences with the entire class. These discussions have shown to increase the number of students who would help other students when they are victimized.

==== Debriefing ====
The term "debriefing" refers to conversational sessions that revolve around the sharing and examining of information after a specific event has taken place. Depending on the situation, debriefing can serve a variety of purposes. It takes into consideration the experiences and facilitates reflection and feedback. Debriefing may involve feedback to the students or among the students, but this is not the intent. The intent is to allow the students to "thaw" and to judge their experience and progress toward change or transformation. The intent is to help them come to terms with their experience. This process involves a cognizance of cycle that students may have to be guided to completely debrief. Teachers should not be overly critical of relapses in behaviour. Once the experience is completely integrated, the students will exit this cycle and get on with the next.

Debriefing is a daily exercise in most professions. It might be in psychology, healthcare, politics, or business. This is also accepted as an everyday necessity.

==== Classroom Action Research ====
Classroom Action Research is a method of finding out what works best in your own classroom so that you can improve student learning. We know a great deal about good teaching in general (e.g. McKeachie, 1999; Chickering and Gamson, 1987; Weimer, 1996), but every teaching situation is unique in terms of content, level, student skills, and learning styles, teacher skills and teaching styles, and many other factors. To maximize student learning, a teacher must find out what works best in a particular situation. Each teaching and research method, model and family is essential to the practice of technology studies. Teachers have their strengths and weaknesses, and adopt particular models to complement strengths and contradict weaknesses. Here, the teacher is well aware of the type of knowledge to be constructed. At other times, teachers equip their students with a research method to challenge them to construct new meanings and knowledge. In schools, the research methods are simplified, allowing the students to access the methods at their own levels.

=== Questioning ===
Questioning is one of the oldest documented teaching methods, and can be used by teachers in a variety of ways for a variety of purposes including, checking for understanding, clarifying terms, exposing misconceptions, and gathering evidence of learning to inform subsequent instructional decisions.

==== Socratic questioning ====
Named after Socrates, socratic questioning is described by his pupil Plato as a form of questioning where the teacher probes underlying misconceptions to lead students towards deeper understanding.

==== Cold calling ====
Cold calling is a teaching methodology based around the teacher asking questions to students without letting the students know beforehand who will be called upon to answer by the teacher. Cold calling aims to increase inclusion in the classroom and active learning as well as student engagement and participation. Cold calling in education is distinct from cold-calling in sales which is a form of business solicitation. Cold calling as a teaching methodology has been linked to increased student participation, increased student voluntary participation, increased student engagement, increased student in class gender equity and no decrease in student comfort levels in class. There is some evidence that the effectiveness of cold calling as teaching method is connected to the use of covert retrieval practice.

=== Feedback ===
Feedback is targeted information given to students about their current performance relative to their desired learning goals. It should aim to (and be capable of producing) improvement in students' learning, as well as being bidirectional by giving teachers feedback on student performance which in turn helps teachers plan the next steps in learning. Feedback in its various forms can be a potent teaching method with potentially large impacts on student achievement. It can also have some negative side effects under certain conditions.

== Effectiveness of teaching methods ==
Small effects or lack of statistically significant effects have been found when evaluating many teaching methods rigorously with randomized controlled trials. Many teaching methods targeting cognitive skills show quickly disappearing impacts.

== Evolution of teaching methods ==
=== Ancient education ===
About 3000 BC, with the advent of writing, education became more conscious or self-reflecting, with specialized occupations such as scribe and astronomer requiring particular skills and knowledge. Philosophy in ancient Greece led to questions of educational method entering national discourse.

In his literary work The Republic, Plato described a system of instruction that he felt would lead to an ideal state. In his dialogues, Plato described the Socratic method, a form of inquiry and debate intended to stimulate critical thinking and illuminate ideas.

Many commentators on the Christian New Testament make reference to the teaching methodology of Jesus Christ, who "used a variety of teaching techniques to impress his teaching on his hearers". It has been the intent of many educators since Plato, such as the Roman educator Quintilian, who lived shortly after Jesus, to find specific, interesting ways to encourage students to use their intelligence and to help them to learn.

=== Medieval education ===
Comenius, in Bohemia, wanted all children to learn. In his The World in Pictures, he created an illustrated textbook of things children would be familiar with in everyday life and used it to teach children. Rabelais described how the student Gargantua learned about the world, and what is in it.

Much later, Jean-Jacques Rousseau in his Emile, presented methodology to teach children the elements of science and other subjects. During Napoleonic warfare, the teaching methodology of Johann Heinrich Pestalozzi of Switzerland enabled refugee children, of a class believed to be unteachable, to learn. He described this in his account of an educational experiment at Stanz.

=== 19th century ===
The Prussian education system was a system of mandatory education dating to the early 19th century. Parts of the Prussian education system have served as models for the education systems in a number of other countries, including Japan and the United States. The Prussian model required classroom management skills to be incorporated into the teaching process.

The University of Oxford and the University of Cambridge in England developed their distinctive method of teaching, the tutorial system, in the 19th century. This involves very small groups, from one to three students, meeting on a regular basis with tutors (originally college fellows, and now also doctoral students and post-docs) to discuss and debate pre-prepared work (either essays or problems). This is the central teaching method of these universities in both arts and science subjects, and has been compared to the Socratic method.

=== Experimental pedagogy ===
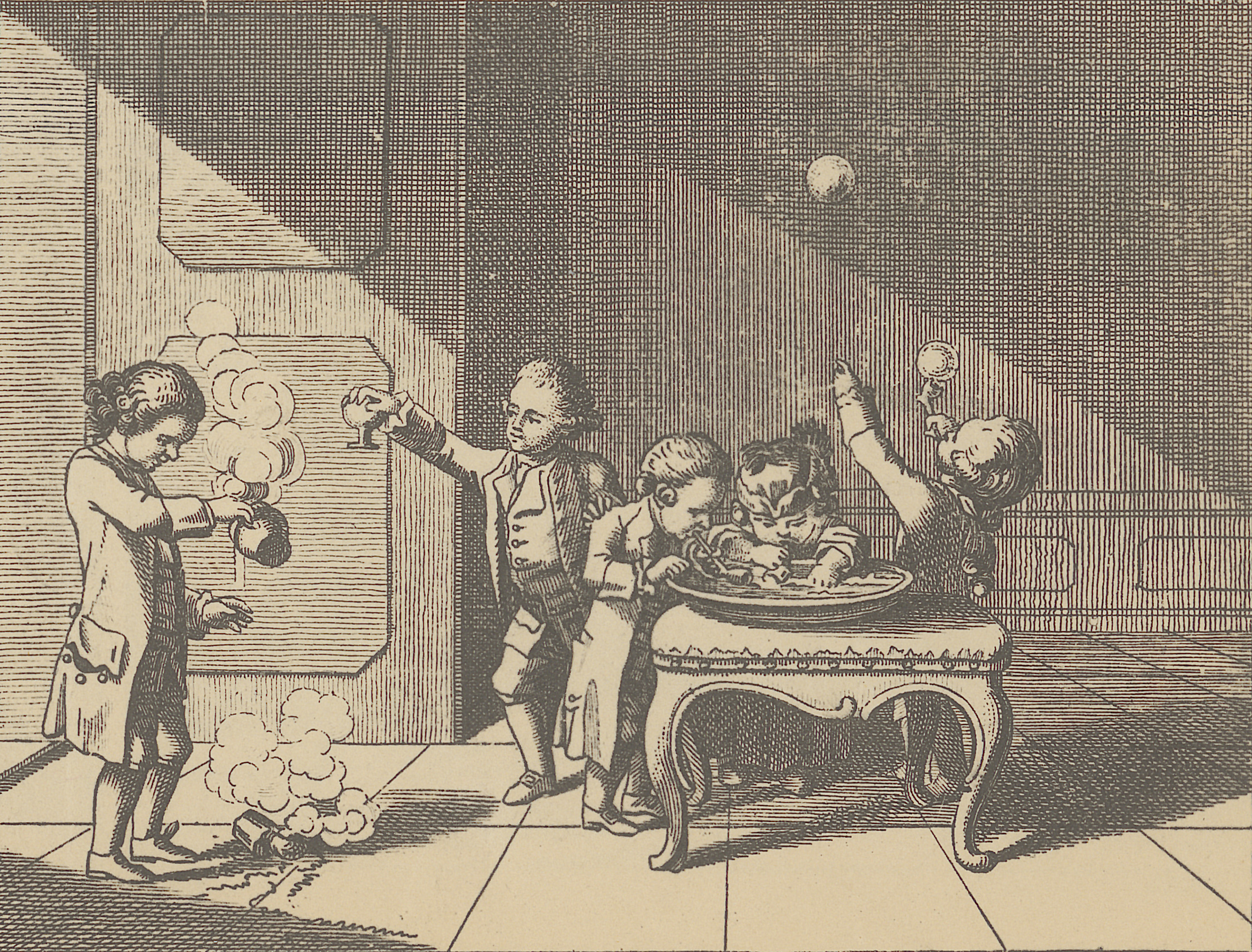
Children's experiments (Daniel Chodowiecki & Johann B. Basedow)

Experimental pedagogy is a pedagogical trend that appeared at the end of the 19th and the beginning of the 20th century, whose task was to introduce, in addition to observation, the experimental method into the study of teaching. This field of study employs scientific methods to investigate teaching and learning, aiming to improve educational practices by testing different approaches and measuring their effectiveness.

The main credit for the constitution of experimental pedagogy as a special direction and the development of its theoretical foundations belongs to two German pedagogues, Ernst Meumann and Wilhelm August Lay, who are also considered the founders of experimental pedagogy. There are also Alfred Binet and Théodore Simon in France, Joseph Mayer Rice, Edward Thorndike and G. Stanley Hall in America, Édouard Claparède and Robert Dottrens in Switzerland, Alexander Petrovich Nechaev in Russia, etc.

Key characteristics of experimental pedagogy include being evidence-based, rigorous in study design, and oriented towards improvement. The field investigates the effectiveness of various teaching methods, the impact of instructional materials, and factors influencing student learning.

Experimental pedagogy has the potential to significantly impact education by offering evidence-based support for effective practices. Examples of its application include studies on the use of technology in the classroom, the influence of different teaching methods on student motivation, and the examination of factors affecting student achievement.

Examples of experimental pedagogy in educational action include:

- A study on the effectiveness of using technology in the classroom, comparing the learning outcomes of students using tablets with those who do not.
- A study on the impact of different teaching methods on student motivation, comparing motivation levels in classes using different approaches.
- A study on the factors influencing student achievement, examining factors such as student background, family income, and resource access.

=== 20th century ===
Newer teaching methods may incorporate television, radio, internet, multi media, and other modern devices. Some educators believe that the use of technology, while facilitating learning to some degree, is not a substitute for educational methods that encourage critical thinking and a desire to learn. Inquiry learning is another modern teaching method. A popular teaching method that is being used by many teachers is hands on activities. Hands-on activities are activities that require movement, talking, and listening.

== See also ==
- Active learning – Educational technique
- Asynchronous learning – Learning that occurs on each individual student's time
- Business game – Game used for business management education
- Case method – Teaching approach
- Didactics – Teaching method
- Differentiated instruction – Framework or philosophy for effective teaching
- Design-based learning – Learner centric pedagogy
- Educational psychology – Branch of psychology concerned with the scientific study of human learning
- Educational philosophy – Study of nature and aims of education
- Effective schools
- Example choice – Teaching method
- Experiential learning – Theory and philosophy of learning
- Kinesthetic learning – Learning by physical activities
- Lesson plan – Description of the course of instruction for a lesson
- Passive learning – Learning method
- Pedagogical pattern – Re-usable form of a solution to a problem or task in pedagogy
- Pedagogical Content Knowledge - Psychology in Teaching
- Pedagogy – Theory and practice of education
- Phenomenon-based learning – Learner centric pedagogy
- Problem solving – Process of achieving a goal by overcoming obstacles
- Teacher education – Training teachers to develop teaching skills
- Teacher look – Classroom behaviour management technique
- Training – Acquisition of knowledge, skills, and competencies as a result of teaching or practice
