= October Island =

1952 novel by William March

- First US edition
- Author: William March
- Language: English
- Publisher: Little, Brown (US); Gollancz (UK)
- Publication date: 1952
- Publication place: United States
- Media type: Print (Hardback & Paperback)
- Preceded by: Trial Balance: The Collected Short Stories of William March (1945)
- Followed by: The Bad Seed (1954)

October Island is a novel by American author William March, first published in 1952 by Little, Brown (in the United States) and Gollancz (in the United Kingdom). The book is not currently in print.

While there were plenty of reviews (Roy S. Simmonds lists 29 in his William March: An Annotated Checklist), many of them were quite negative; most of the negative reviews claimed the book was flat and uninteresting. In The New York Times Book Review, Donald Barr complained that the characters were marionettes; John Betjeman, in the Daily Telegraph, was even more critical: "The book is written simply, but it is empty, and there is really nothing beyond its simplicity. It is neither real nor fantastic."

Positive appraisal came from, for instance, Charles Poore, in The New York Times, who praises March's "novel of salt and savor" full of "quiet, uninsistent irony" and his "mordant undertones of commentary on what it truly means to be an outcast."
