= 99 Fables =

Book by William March

- Author: William March
- Cover artist: Richard Brough
- Language: English
- Genre: Fable
- Publisher: 1960 (University of Alabama Press)
- Publication place: United States
- Media type: Print (hardback)
- Pages: 202 pp
- Preceded by: A William March Omnibus

99 Fables is a book of fables by American author William March. The collection was first written around 1938 (there were ca. 125 fables then) but was never published as a whole. More than 40 had been published in journals and magazines such as Prairie Schooner, Kansas Magazine, Rocky Mountain Review, and New York Post. Not long before his death in 1954, March returned to the collection and edited it, leaving 99 fables in all. March's manuscripts of the fables were further edited in 1959 by William T. Going, and published in 1960 by the University of Alabama Press, with illustrations by Richard Brough. The cover won an award at the 1960 Southern Books Competition.

== 99 Fables in March's oeuvre ==
Although the collection is among the most obscure of March's works, 99 Fables stands as an almost complete picture of the world March inhabited: many of the complex themes that populate much of March's work are here restated in a more simplistic form. The editor of the collection, William T. Going, says, "The fables, then, come close to providing as personal a summary of March's world as we are likely to have. Here are all his favorite ideas, the epitomes of the themes of his fiction."

== Critical reception ==
What few reviews there are (Simmonds lists only three in his William March: An Annotated Checklist) are mixed. According to Allen King, writing in the South Atlantic Bulletin, March "emphasizes the platitudes of life by the platitudinous nature of his fables." Harper Lee, in a review of the book, compares March's career with that of Ambrose Bierce:

"As one reads the fables, one is haunted by the resemblance of William March to his natural predecessor, Ambrose Bierce. The two men had much in common: their work is criss-crossed with similar themes; both were ridden with personal demons; both viewed life with bitterness; each was a minor genius; and each was the most neglected writer of his time."

== Canonical status ==
99 Fables has not yet achieved the status its editor thinks it deserves, though occasionally the book, which was never reprinted and is a relatively rare university press publication, has received significant mention a few times. Leonard Feinberg referred to its "poignant cynicism" in his Introduction to Satire. An example of March's cynicism is found in the fable, "The Unspeakable Words," which was included in a reader on rhetoric. In the fable, a committee investigates linguistic corruption in "the Brett language," wishing to eradicate four particular offensive words. They find a five-year-old girl who was raised by deaf and dumb parents, and so can not have learned the four offensive words they hope to ban:

On the morning they visited her, they said solemnly, "Do you know the meaning of poost, gist, duss, and feng?"
The little girl admitted that she did not, and then, smiling happily, she said, "Oh, you must mean feek, kusk, dalu, and liben!"
Those who don't know the words must make them up for themselves.
