= Olympia High School (Olympia, Washington) =

Location
- 1302 North St. Olympia, Washington 98501; United States; 47°01′07″N 122°53′05″W

Information
- Type: Public secondary
- Motto: We, the Olympia High School Community, are dedicated to personal excellence and responsible citizenship.
- Established: 1849, 1907 became William Winlock Miller
- School district: Olympia School District 111
- NCES School ID: 530618000937
- Principal: Matt Grant
- Teaching staff: 79.20 (FTE)
- Grades: 9-12
- Enrollment: 1,901 (2026-2027)
- Student to teacher ratio: 23.08
- Campus: Suburban
- Colors: Blue & White
- Mascot: Bears
- Nickname: Oly
- Yearbook: The Olympiad
- Website: olympia.osd.wednet.edu

Olympia High School (OHS), commonly known as Oly, is a public high school in southeast Olympia, Washington along the city's border with Tumwater. Sometimes referred to by its official name as William Winlock Miller High School, Oly is the oldest of two comprehensive high schools in the Olympia School District, and also one of the oldest public secondary schools in the state of Washington.

== History ==
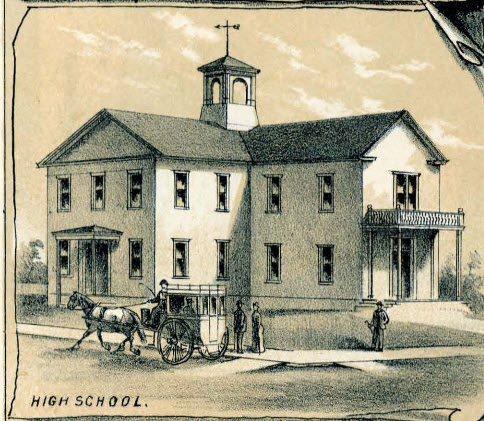
Olympia High School in 1889.

William Winlock Miller High School (unofficially named Olympia High School) opened in 1849 as additional public schooling beyond 1-8 curriculum and graduated its first class in 1849. OHS shared a few locations with elementary schools before having its own building in 1907, when OHS became officially named William Winlock Miller School, a high school. The 1907 building was built on a square block donated by the widow of pioneer leader William Winlock Miller on ground immediately east of the today's sunken gardens, part of the Washington State Capitol Campus. That building burned in 1918, its Tenino sandstone was salvaged in 1920 to construct the face of the Power House on Capitol Lake, used to heat Washington's permanent capitol campus that proceeded in construction.

The next structure for W.W. Miller High School was built in 1919 between 12th and 13th Streets on Capitol Way because the state had purchased the land near the sunken garden to increase the Capitol grounds. An auditorium, gymnasium, and more classrooms were added to that building in 1926; however, any further expansion on this site was impossible. As the school's capacity needed increasing, 40 acres (160,000 m^{2}) between Carlyon Avenue and North Street were purchased.

Until 1955, Oly drew students from all of Thurston County, Washington, except its most southern reaches. But Oly's catchment area split in 1955 with the creation North Thurston High School, then split again in 1961 as Tumwater High School opened, then once again with the spawning of Capital High School in 1975. Today's location of OHS opened in 1961, and underwent a full renovation, completed in the summer of 2000 that enclosed the 9 separate buildings of the 1961 design.

== Sports ==
Olympia High School is a 4A-division member of the Washington Interscholastic Activities Association. Olympia High School is known for their athletics teams consistently placing in the top 10 for the 4A classification.

State Championships
Season	Sport	Number of Championships	Year
Fall	Cross Country, Girls'	1	1978
Fall	Football	2	1953, 1984
Fall	Golf, Boys'	1	1996
Fall	Swimming, Girls'	1	1987
Fall	Volleyball, Girls'	2	1998, 2011
Winter	Basketball, Boys'	2	1929, 1986
Winter	Swimming, Boys'	3	1956, 1957, 1985
Spring	Baseball, Boys'	1	2022
Spring	Golf, Girls'	1	1998
Spring	Tennis, Boys'	4	1983, 1984, 1998, 2012
Spring	Tennis, Girls'	1	2006
Spring	Track and Field, Boys'	2	1932, 1998
Spring	Track and Field, Girls'	1	2006
Total		22	

State Championships, second place:

Boys' Basketball - 1987, 1998, 2023; Girls' Golf - 1997; Girls' Gymnastics - 1998; Girls' Soccer - 1988, 1995; Boys' Swimming - 1958, 1970, 1972; Girls' Swimming - 1989, 1995; Boys' Tennis - 1979, 1982, 1990, 2007; Girls' Tennis - 1982, 1999; Girls' Volleyball - 1981; Baseball - 2019; Girls' Bowling - 2022

== Notable alumni ==
- General Muir S. Fairchild, 1913, Vice Chief of Staff for USAF, first Academy commander, key air war strategist in World War II, World War I flyboy
- Eric Alexander, 1986, Jazz musician
- Gerry L. Alexander, 1954, Chief Justice, Washington State Supreme Court
- Peter Blecha, 1974, historian, curator, essayist, author, musician
- Floyd Brown, 1980, author, speaker and media commentator
- Adam Conley, 2008, former MLB player (Miami Marlins)
- Gretchen Christopher, 1958, singer, The Fleetwoods
- Bruce P. Crandall, 1951, Lieutenant Colonel, United States Army (Ret.) (Medal of Honor Recipient) (helicopter pilot, call sign "Snake", in movie We Were Soldiers)
- Geraldine de Courcy, 1902, music critic, author, intelligence worker, translator
- Daniella Deutscher, 1994, actress
- Barbara Ellis, 1958, singer, The Fleetwoods
- Dan Erickson, 2002, Creator, Writer and Executive Producer of Severance [1]
- Ira Flagstead, 1911(?), former MLB player (Detroit Tigers, Boston Braves, Washington Senators, Pittsburgh Pirates)
- Rickie Lee Jones, 1974, singer, songwriter, producer
- Kathleen Hays, 1970, financial reporter on the Bloomberg TV network
- Douglas Massey, 1970, professor of sociology and former president (2000–01) of the American Sociological Association
- Mel Melin, 1958, former CFL player (BC Lions)
- Bill Moos, 1969, Director of Athletics at the University of Nebraska
- Moon Mullen, 1935(?) former MLB player (Philadelphia Phillies)
- Thai Nguyen, 1998, fashion designer
- Joy Osmanski, 1993, actress, television series The Loop and It's Always Sunny in Philadelphia
- Don Rich, 1959, guitarist/fiddler/band leader for Buck Owens and the Buckaroos
- Travis Shook, 1986, jazz musician
- Irene Stewart, 1975, Seattle School Board member
- Gary Troxel, 1958, singer, The Fleetwoods
- Bud Ward, 1932, two-time winner of the US Amateur Golf Championship (1939, 1941)
