= The Tallons =

1936 southern gothic novel by William March

Come in at the Door
- Author: William March
- Language: English
- Genre: Southern Gothic
- Publisher: Random House and University of Alabama Press
- Publication date: 1936
- Publication place: United States
- ISBN: 978-0-8173-5810-5
- LC Class: PS3505.A53157 T35 2014
- Followed by: The Looking-Glass

The Tallons is the second novel in Alabama author William March’s “Pearl County” collection of novels and short fiction. It is an example of the Southern Gothic genre. Like its predecessor, Come in at the Door and sequel, The Looking-Glass, The Tallons is set in the mythical towns of Reedyville and Baycity, the latter offering a fictionalized vision of Mobile, Alabama. The book was first published in 1936 by Random House in New York and republished by the University of Alabama Press in 2015.

== Plot ==
The novel centers on the Tallon brothers, Jim and Andrew, who become entangled in a love triangle with Myrtle Bickerstaff. An older Tallon brother, Brad, was a minor character in the first book in March's "Pearl County" series, the 1934 novel Come in at the Door.
