= Frank Cyril Shaw Davison =

Canadian-born novelist (1893–1960)

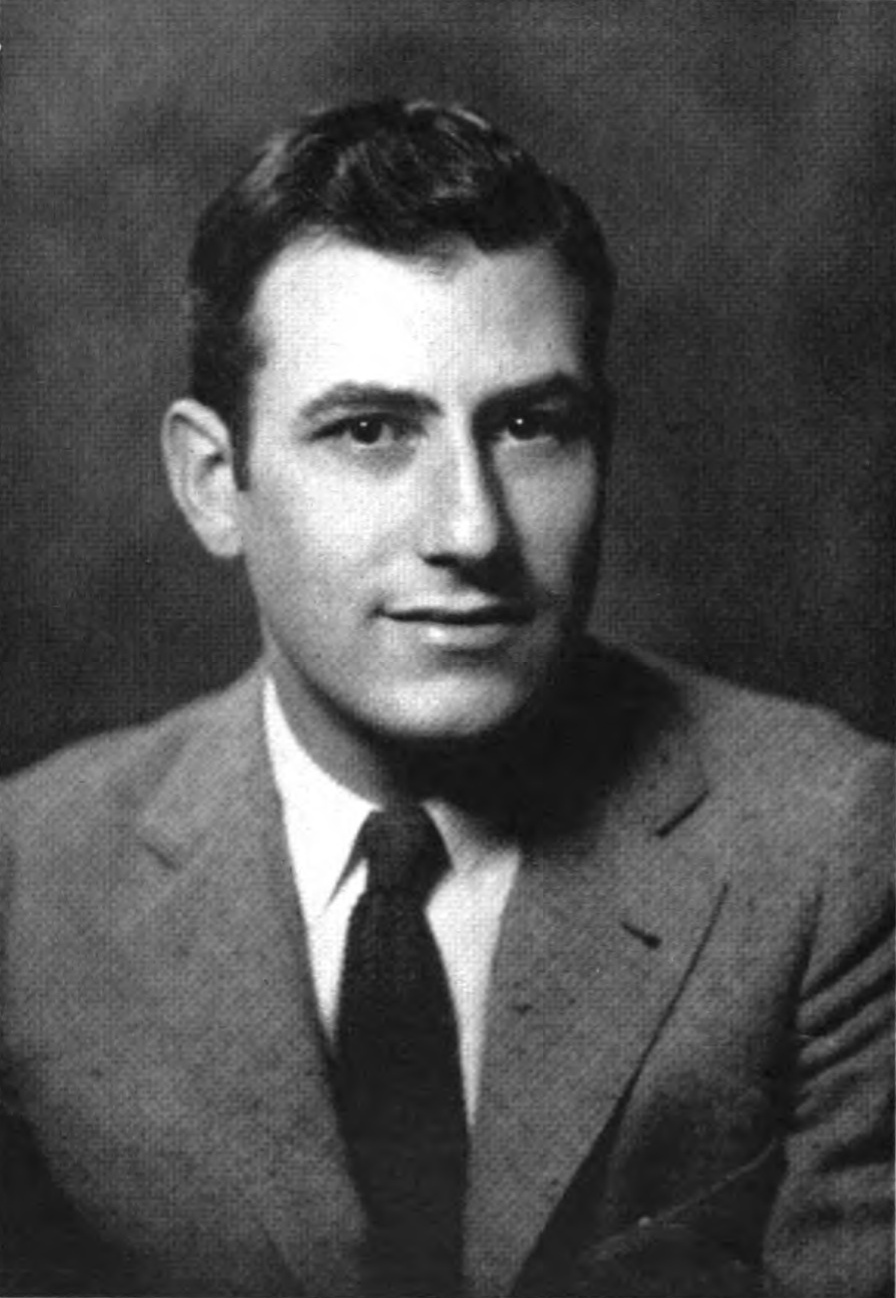
Frank C. Davison

Frank Cyril Shaw Davison (February 3, 1893 – March 31, 1960) was a Canadian-born novelist who published under the nom de plume Pierre Coalfleet. He published four novels between 1921 and 1927. He adapted, and translated European plays, often in collaboration with Rita Matthias (Marguerite Julie Strauss).

Davison's association with the American artist Marsden Hartley is well documented in Hartley studies. They met in Berlin in the early 1920s, and remained friends until Hartley's death in 1943.

As a result of a misspelling of Coalfleet, it has only recently come to light that Davison was among the 2,820 names that appeared in the Sonderfahndungsliste G. B., the Gestapo's secret list of prominent British residents to be immediately arrested, were Germany to have succeeded in plans to occupy Great Britain.

== Early life and education ==
Frank C. Davison was born in Hantsport, Nova Scotia, in 1893. His father was Hiram Coalfleet Davison, a Master Mariner, and his mother was Bertha, nee Shaw. He spent much of his early childhood aboard merchant ships at sea with his family.

Davison received an A.B. from McGill University in 1913, and an M.A. in comparative literature from Harvard University in 1914. He was enrolled at The University of California, Berkeley, for the 1918–1919 term, though he does not appear to have completed a degree there.

Davison's early professional life was spent in New York City, working as private secretary to Henry Goddard Leach, with whom a decade later, he would become co-editor of the literary journal The Forum. After World War I, he took a position at the Carnegie Endowment for International Peace in Washington, D.C., and shortly thereafter, at the secretariat of the League of Nations in Geneva in 1920–1921.

== Writing career ==
Davison moved to London, and settled there, though he traveled often throughout his life. In London he worked full time writing; as novelist, playwright, translator, editor, and newspaper correspondent. His novels appeared between the years 1921 and 1927, and were published under the nom de plume Pierre Coalfleet.

After the publication of the first of these, he traveled to Berlin in 1922, with a letter of introduction to the American artist Marsden Hartley, who was residing there at the time. Their initial encounter is described in the writings of each of these men. Davison's account of his time spent with Hartley fills a void in Hartley scholarship pertaining to this phase in the artist's life. In particular, Hartley's day to day experience of Gay culture during the Weimar period is described in great detail. The importance of the relationship that developed between them is demonstrated by the fact that Hartley, an accomplished poet, references Davison as Pierre Coalfleet in his poem Mediocrity, that was included in his first volume of poetry, Twenty-Five Poems, published in 1923. In the summer of 1927, they spent two weeks together in the south of France, at the house Davison had bought in Banyuls-sur-Mer.

In Berlin, Hartley introduced Davison to the sculptor Arnold Ronnebeck. Ronnebeck, who had exhibited a portrait of Hartley at The Salon d'Automne of 1912, executes his "Portrait of Pierre Coalfleet", which was later shown at his first solo exhibition in 1925, at the Weyhe Gallery in New York City. Ronnebeck made portrait busts of many other artists of the period, including Georgia O'Keeffe, Charles Demuth, Ananda Coomaaraswamy, and George Antheil. Like Hartley, Ronnebeck developed a close friendship with Davison, as evidenced by his role as Best Man at the Ronnebeck wedding. The wedding was attended by Mabel Dodge and her husband, Tony Luhan, who arrived "dressed in formal Indian attire" much to the dismay of the bride.

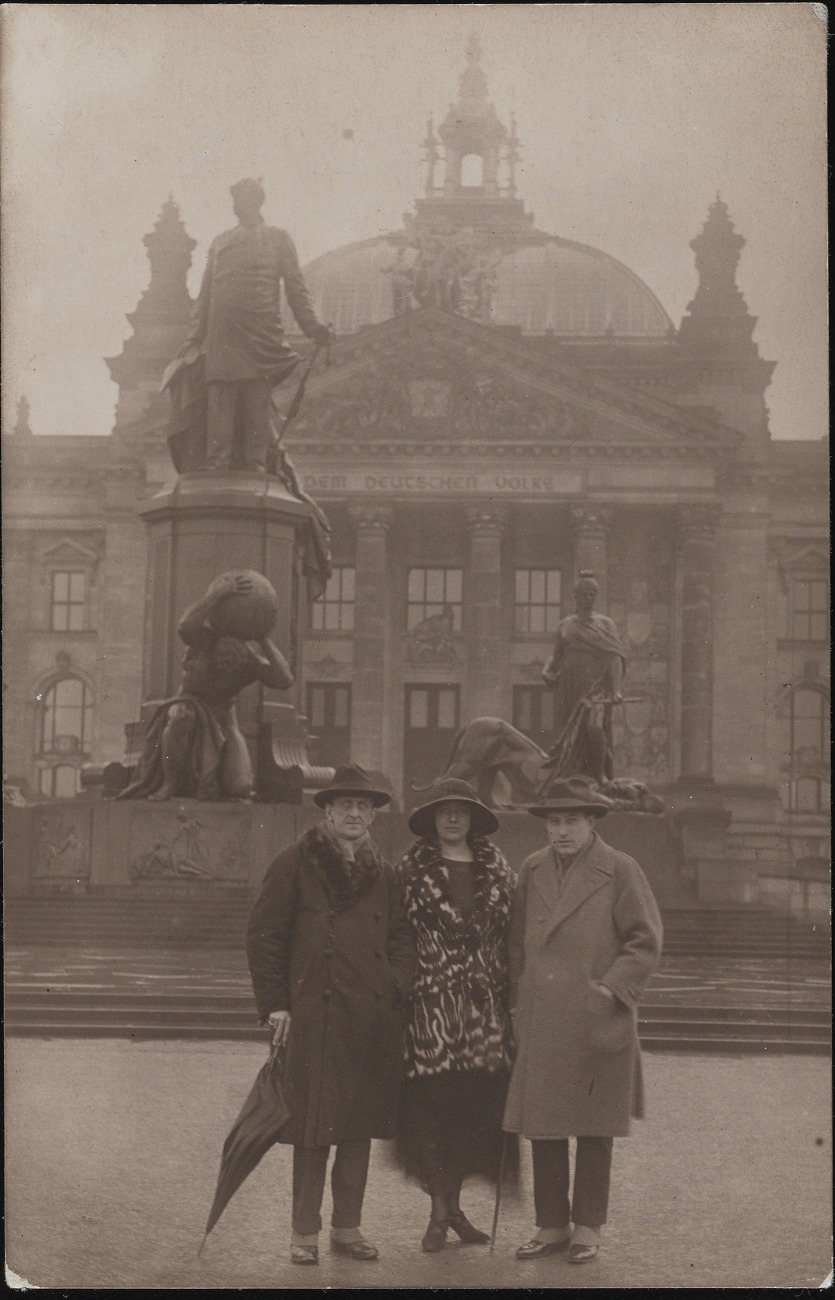
Frank C. Davison with Marsden Hartley and Rita Matthias, Berlin, 1922.

While still in Berlin, Davison met the American actor/writer/translator Rita Matthias, nee Marguerite Julie Strauss, with whom he would frequently collaborate as translators of the works of European playwrights.

In addition to Matthias, other collaborators included the writer John Hanlon Mitchell, and the illustrator, Thomas Handforth, who became the second recipient of the Caldecott Medal. Handforth provided illustrations for the 1925 novel Sidonie, as well as the 1926 story published in The Forum, On the Riviera Levante.

Davison was briefly back in New York in 1923, to take up his position as Co-Editor, with H. G. Leach, at The Forum. He returned to London the following year as their European Editor.

== World War II ==
Little is known about Davison's life during World War II. However, Davison's name surprisingly appeared (albeit misspelled Pierre Coralfleet) in the notorious Sonderfahndungsliste G. B. His translation and adaptation of Hella Wuolijoki's Women of Property, staged at The Queen's Theatre in London in 1937 received considerable attention in the press, which in turn, may have drawn him to the attention of the Gestapo, given Wuolijoli's notoriety. Homosexuality may also have been a factor.

It has been suggested that Davison fought with the French Resistance during World War II. However, the same published account purports him to have been killed as a result of these efforts, leaving this period of his life open to further investigation.

== BBC years ==
In 1946, Davison joined the BBC as chief sub-editor of West European news. By 1950, he was one of two assistant heads of the West European Service, and in 1953, the Head of the West European Service. He retired from the BBC in February 1954.

== Later life ==
In 1952, Davison sent the manuscript of his memoir, I Took Myself Seriously to the publishing house John Lehmann LTD. The manuscript, as well as John Lehmann's rejection letter, are held in The Frank Cyril Shaw Davison Archive at The Library and Archives Canada.

Davison died in Ibiza, Balearic Islands, on March 31, 1960.

== Works ==
Novels

- Sidonie 1921
- Solo 1924
- Hare and Tortoise 1925
- Meanwhile 1927

Plays

- The Deuce; a comedy in 13 scenes, by Christian Dietrich Grabbe. Trans. from the German and adapted by Pierre Coalfleet. 1923
- The Flight to Venice: a play in 4 acts. Translated by Pierre Coalfleet and Rita Matthias, from the German by Georg Kaiser. 1923.
- Family Hold Back with John Hanlon Mitchell. 1936. Aldwich Theatre, London December, 1936. Cast included Margaret Webster.
- Women of Property. Queen's Theatre, London, 1937. Translated by Frank Davison from the Finnish of Hella Wuoliloki. Cast included Mary Morris.

Essays

- On The Riviera Levante, with illustrations by Thomas Handforth.

Memoir

- I Took Myself Seriously (Unpublished manuscript)
