= Come in at the Door =

1934 book by William March

- First edition
- Author: William March
- Language: English
- Genre: Southern Gothic
- Publisher: Smith & Haas and University of Alabama Press
- Publication date: 1934
- Publication place: United States
- ISBN: 978-0-8173-5811-2
- LC Class: PZ3.C1553 PS3505.A53157
- Followed by: The Tallons

Come in at the Door is the first book in Alabama author William March’s “Pearl County” collection of novels and short fiction. It is an example of the Southern Gothic genre. Following the success of March's first novel, Company K, about World War I, the author began to explore his own childhood in south Alabama in his fiction. Come in at the Door is set in the three towns of Hodgetown, Reedyville, and Baycity, the latter offering a fictionalized vision of Mobile, Alabama. The book was first published in 1934 by Smith & Haas in New York and republished by the University of Alabama Press in 2015. The other novels in the series are The Tallons and The Looking-Glass.

Come in at the Door tells the life story of Chester Hurry, who becomes the central character in the Pearl County series. In it, the author interweaves a traditional linear narrative with diary entries from Chester's aunt's journal as well as numerous short fable-like entries by a character called “The Whisperer.”

== Plot summary ==
Chester Hurry lives with his widowed father, Robert, and an African American domestic servant, Mitty. Mitty had come to the family with Chester's mother when she married Robert. At the time the story commences, Mitty has become a surrogate mother to Chester and is involved in a sexual relationship with Robert.

The trio occupies the traditional Hurry home in Hodgetown on an increasingly impoverished farm. Adjacent to the home are two cabins, one occupied by an elder African American couple, Hattie and Jim. The second is vacant. The placid rhythm of the family's life is interrupted by the arrival of Baptiste, an educated, francophone, mixed-race drifter. Robert asks Baptiste to occupy the second cabin and tutor Chester, who had not till then attended school.

Witnessing a botched hanging in the county seat of Athelstan becomes a pivotal trauma in Chester's early life. Following an illness not long after that event, young Chester is sent to live with his mother's family in Reedyville, which is the setting for many of the stories in the Pearl County series. The time for Chester's return to Hodgetown comes and goes. Chester continues to live with his widowed grandfather, unmarried great-aunt, and uncle Bushrod “Bush” Tarleton, and his mother's family encourages Chester academically. Chester forms a close relationship with Bushrod, who's been left single when his wife, a sexually promiscuous woman in Reedyville, leaves him.

Chester graduates with honors from the Reedyville high school. The story shifts to Baycity (Mobile) when Bushrod moves there and takes Chester with him. Chester reaches adulthood and begins work in a business office, an experience that closely mirrors March's own life in Mobile as a young man. Chester marries, and March explores the psychology of his well-intentioned but ultimately failed marriage. The story returns to Hodgetown as his father, Robert, nears death.

== Reception ==
In Spectator, [Graham Greene] singled out the opening passages: "Come in at the Door is a novel of exceptional interest; the first hundred pages, had they been published separately as a long short story, could have ranked with the best stories of childhood in English."

The novel received generally positive reviews, Kirkus Reviews writing that "This book establishes March as more than a 'one-book-man'". Variety wrote that, "It’s a strong book with a great deal of merit, although it isn’t going to be liked universally, being a restless, unhappy tome about restless, unhappy people. Probably will be compared to Caldwell and Faulkner, although it belongs in a category of its own." Clifton Fadiman, reviewing the novel in The New Yorker, wrote: "Come in the at the Door is a sound novel and a first-rate psychological study of the growth of a fear neurosis."
