= Ernst Meumann =

German psychologist, educationist and philosopher (1862–1915)

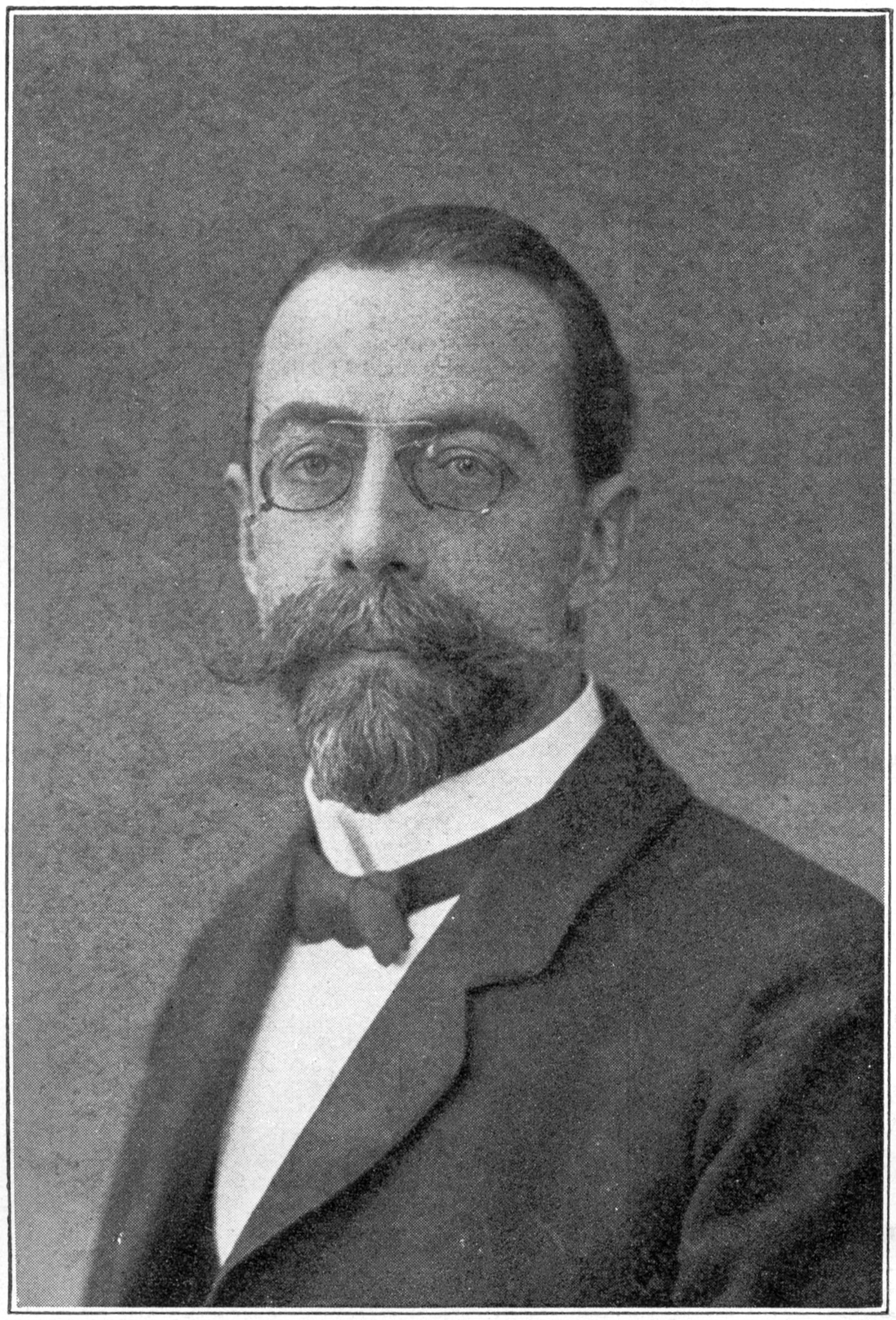
Ernst Meumann

Ernst Friedrich Wilhelm Meumann (29 August 1862, Uerdingen, Krefeld – 26 April 1915, Hamburg, German Empire) was a German educator, pedagogist and psychologist, the co-founder of experimental pedagogy (the other is Wilhelm August Lay).

== Works ==
- Die Sprache des Kindes (1903)
- Über Ökonomie und Technik des Lernens (1903)
- Der Verzug des Schuldners nach dem Recht des BGB für das Deutsche Reich (1907, 1911)
- Intelligenz und Wille. (1908, 1913, 1920, 1925)
- Ökonomie und Technik des Gedächtnisses (1908)
- Vorlesungen zur Einführung in die experimentelle Pädagogik (1907, 1912, 1920)
- System der Ästhetik (1914)
- Abriss der experimentellen Pädagogik (1914)
- The psychology of learning: an experimental investigation of the economy and technique of memory. 2012, Nabu press. ISBN 9781279520284

== See also ==
- Pedagogy
- Education
- Psychology
