= Kneel to the Prettiest =

Kneel to the Prettiest may refer to:

- Kneel to the Prettiest, a 1925 novel by Berta Ruck
- The Looking-Glass, a 1943 novel by William March, originally titled Kneel to the Prettiest
