= The Two Worlds of William March =

Book by Roy S. Simmonds

- Title page for The Two Worlds of William March (1984)
- Author: Roy S. Simmonds
- Language: English
- Publication date: 1984
- ISBN: 9780817301675

The Two Worlds of William March is a 1984 biography of William March, written by the British scholar, critic and author Roy S. Simmonds. William Butcher, reviewing the biography for World Literature Today, called it "a judicious record of March's life and a fine tribute to his literary achievement".
