= The Little Wife and Other Stories =

First edition (US) (publ. Harrison Smith and Robert Haas)

The Little Wife and Other Stories is a 1935 collection of short stories by William March. Many of the stories were first published in magazines. The title story is set in March's Reedyville, an imaginary town in Alabama.

The collection was favorably reviewed in The New York Times, which praised the "penetrating stories" and their poetic quality, and compared Reedyville to William Faulkner's Jefferson, Mississippi. The stories are ordered chronologically in order of their first publication; March's biographer Roy Simmonds remarks that the quality declines as the book progresses. March had worked for the Waterman Steamship Corporation, but during the time the stories for The Little Wife were published had left the company to focus on his literary career and break into the mass market.
