= Robert Dottrens =

Swiss educationist & scholar (1893–1984)

Robert Dottrens (April 27, 1893, Carouge - February 11, 1984, Troinex) was a Swiss educator and professor of general pedagogy and history of pedagogy at the University of Geneva, founder of experimental pedagogy in Switzerland.

== Biography ==
Dottrens was born on April 27, 1893, in Carouge, Geneva, Switzerland, where he completed his primary and secondary education. Later, he obtained his diploma from the Jean-Jacques Rousseau Institute, where he began teaching in 1925. He worked towards the collaboration between the Institute and the University of Geneva. In 1931, he defended a thesis in sociology titled "The Problem of Inspection and New Education: An Essay on Pedagogical and Social Control of Primary Education." He founded and later directed the experimental Mail School (1928-1952). In 1931, Robert Dottrens became a private-docent, and subsequently, he became a professor of general pedagogy and the history of pedagogy at the University of Geneva (1952-1963), where he established the Laboratory of Experimental Pedagogy.

He was a founding member of the International Bureau of Education in 1925 and a member of its council from 1929 to 1959. He actively participated in meetings of experimentalist teachers, leading to the establishment of the Association Internationale de Pédagogie Expérimentale de Langue Française (AIPELF). He was responsible for organizing the first meeting of university teachers in Lyon in 1953.

Dottrens, a professor of pedagogy at the University of Geneva, ascended to the position after an intensive career as a teacher and later as the director of education in the Canton of Geneva. A fundamental characteristic of Dottrens work is his experimental approach, linked to the need for individualization of teaching.

For the former, he sought contributions from sociology to pedagogical research, while for the latter, he worked on creating tools to tailor instruction to individual needs, treating each individual as an active participant in social life. Among these techniques, the most well-known involves the construction and use of individual exercise cards for recovery in every discipline.

== Publications ==
- Le problème de l'inspection et l'éducation nouvelle: essai sur le contrôle pédagogique et social de l'enseignement primaire (1931)
- Le progrès à l'école: sélection des élèves ou changement des méthodes (1936)
- L'enseignement individualisé (1936, 1947)
- Éducation et démocratie; réflexions, responsabilités, perspectives (1946)
- Lexikon der Padagogik (1950–1953)
- L'amélioration des programmes scolaires et la pédagogie expérimentale (1957)
- Programmes et plans d'études dans l'enseignement primaire (1961)
- Instituteurs hier; éducateurs demain! L'évolution de l'école primaire (1966)
- Éduquer et instruire (1966)
- La crise de l'education et ses remedes (1971)

== See also ==
- Education
- Pedagogy
