= Some Like Them Short =

1939 short story collection by William March

Some Like Them Short is a 1939 collection of short stories by William March.

== Contents ==
- Geraldette
- A Haircut in Toulouse
- The Listening Post
- The Toy Bank
- A Sum in Addition
- The First Dime
- Runagate Niggers
- Senator Upjohn
- A Short History of England
- Tune the Old Cow Died To
- Bill's Eyes
- The Last Meeting
- Nine Prisoners
- Upon the Dull Earth Dwelling
- The Shoe Drummer
- Sweet, Who Was the Armourer's Maid
- A Snowstorm in the Alps
- The Funeral
- A Memorial to the Slain
- Time and Leigh Brothers
