= Geraldine de Courcy =

Writer, music critic, translator, and intelligence worker

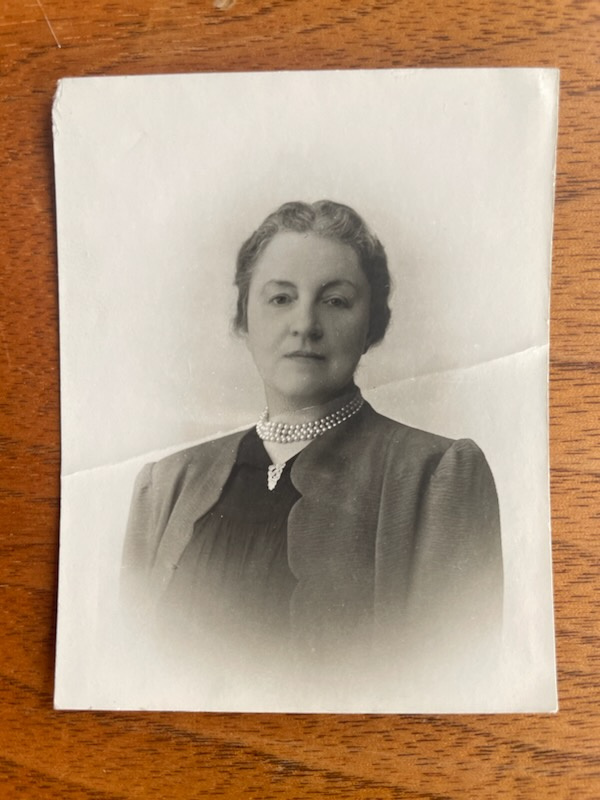
- Geraldine de Courcy
- Born: Geraldine Isabella Caroline Montefiore de Courcy; October 24, 1884; Aberdeen, Mississippi, US
- Died: July 15, 1969; New York City, New York, US
- Occupations: writer, translator, intelligence worker

Geraldine de Courcy (1884 – 1969) was an American writer, music critic, and translator. During World War I she was recognized for providing aid to British internees at the Ruhleben internment camp in Germany. She was hired by the Office of Naval Intelligence in Bern, Switzerland and Berlin, Germany, and was the chief Berlin music critic for the publication Musical America. She wrote a definitive biography of Niccolò Paganini, published in 1957.

== Early life and education ==
Geraldine Isabella Caroline Montefiore de Courcy was born in Aberdeen, Mississippi on October 24, 1884, the daughter of Bolton Waller de Courcy, birth name Bolton Waller de Courcy O'Grady, a Civil War veteran, and member of the O'Grady family, an Irish peerage and Amelia Shannon de Courcy. The family moved to the Puget Sound area of Washington State when she was in grade school. She attended school in Tacoma, Washington and, following the family's move to Olympia, Washington, graduated from Olympia High School. When de Courcy's father died in 1900, her mother discovered that he was already married to another woman, who was still living, and her application for a widow's pension would be denied. De Courcy entered into a career as a music teacher and performer throughout the southern Puget Sound region.

== Move to Berlin ==
In late 1913, de Courcy and her mother traveled to Berlin, Germany, so that de Courcy could pursue serious musical instruction, hoping to study with pianist and teacher Artur Schnabel. However, her application was rejected. In August 1914, World War I broke out. De Courcy and her mother determined to stay on in Berlin, and de Courcy obtained employment at the United States Embassy there, working for ambassador James W. Gerard.

== Ruhleben internment camp ==
In November 1914, all British citizens were rounded up by the German government and sent to various internment camps in Germany. The Ruhleben internment camp was the largest, located at the site of a former racetrack. Since the United States was neutral, the German government permitted the embassy to act as an intermediary to provide supplemental food and money to internees. As personal secretary to Ambassador Gerard, de Courcy visited the camp on a weekly basis, the only woman to be permitted inside the camp. She was later recognized for her services by the British Government with a silver plate loving cup, acceptance of which required an Act of Congress.

After the United States entered the war in 1917, the staff of the embassy were evacuated to Bern, Switzerland. De Courcy was taken on as staff of the US consulate in Bern until the war ended. In 1919, she traveled to the United States and stayed there until early 1920, when she returned to Berlin.

== Return to Berlin and second evacuation ==
De Courcy obtained employment in Berlin with the Office of Naval Intelligence. She also became known in musical circles and was the principal German correspondent for the publication Musical America, a US-based periodical devoted to reporting on musical matters throughout the world. She was invited into the home of concert agents Herman and Louise Wolff, where she was comfortable with such notables as Maurice Ravel and Berlin Philharmonic conductor Wilhelm Furtwängler. During this time she dropped the use of one of her middle names, Montefiore, possibly due to concern that she would be associated with the prominent Jewish Montefiore family. Thereafter, she generally went by G.I.C. de Courcy in her publications.

When the United States entered World War II, embassy staff were again evacuated. For a time they were interned in Jeschke's Grand Hotel in Bad Nauheim, Germany. A history of the internment remarked that de Courcy had been evacuated for a second time. Embassy staff were interned for five months and then sent by train through neutral Spain. De Courcy stayed on in Spain until war's end, returning to the United States on Christmas Eve, 1945.

== Return to the United States and later career ==
De Courcy moved to New York City upon her return to the United States, and entered into a career as a translator and writer. In 1957, she published a two-volume biography of composer and violinist Niccolo Paganini, entitled Paganini, The Genoese. She died in 1969.

== Espionage allegations ==
A notation accompanying a high school class photograph of de Courcy says that she was a World War I spy. No evidence has been unearthed to date to corroborate this claim. However, as a visitor to the Ruhleben internment camp she would have obtained information from British internees about conditions in the camp. During her stay in Berlin prior to evacuation to Bern, she became intimately involved with a pro-German American doctor, Lewis Marks, husband of actress and translator Marguerite Julie Strauss, who was staying at the Hotel Adlon in Berlin. De Courcy was briefly under suspicion from the Bern consulate. She was later cleared and obtained employment with the Office of Naval Intelligence, which made extensive use of lay informants in intelligence gathering.

== Works ==
=== Books ===
- Paganini, the Genoese. Oklahoma: University of Oklahoma Press. 1957. ISBN 978-1019385586.

=== Translations ===
- Louis le Clerc Milfort, Memoir of a Cursory Glance at My Different Travels and My Sojourn in the Creek Nation. Lakeside Press. 1956 translated by Geraldine de Courcy.
- Revesz, Geza, Introduction to the Psychology of Music, Norman, Oklahoma: University of Oklahoma Press. 1954.

=== Articles ===
- "Opera Satire on Modern Life Creates Uproar," Musical America 50 (1930)
- "Historic German Musical Society Disbands," Musical America 2 August 1937
- "Berlin Opera Gives Egk Dance-Drama," Musical America 10 May 1940
