= Theatre History Studies =

Academic journal

Theatre History Studies, founded in 1981, is the official journal of the Mid-America Theatre Conference. Published by University of Alabama Press, it is listed in Scopus and Arts and Humanities Citation Index. Issues since 2007 are accessible through MUSE.
