= Marguerite Julie Strauss =

American actress and translator

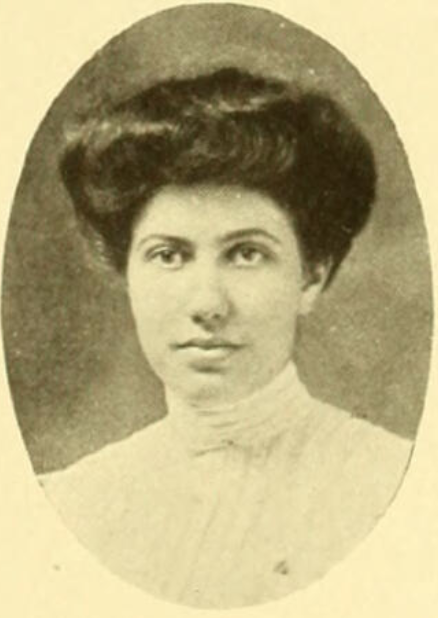
- Strauss, from the 1908 yearbook of Barnard College
- Born: 1888; New York, New York, U.S.
- Died: June 25, 1961 (aged 72–73)
- Other names: Rita Reil, Rita Matthias
- Occupations: Actress, translator, literary agent

Marguerite Julie Strauss, also known as Rita Matthias, (1888 – June 25, 1961) was an American actress and translator. Strauss began her acting career performing on the stage in New York City, as well as across Europe. Her theatrical connections led to a career as a translator, focusing on the works of European playwrights, the crime novels of Edgar Wallace, and the writings of Thomas Mann and his son Klaus Mann.

== Early life and education ==
Strauss was born in 1888 in New York City. Her parents were Gustavus E., and Sadie (née Michels) Strauss. Her father was a manufacturer of automotive parts for the pioneers of the automobile industry. Her sister, Adele, married Harry N. Allen, who in 1907, introduced the first fleet of gasoline powered taxicabs into the streets of New York City. Adele was a civic leader who helped found the Women's Auxiliary of The French Hospital in 1914.

Marguerite J. Strauss graduated from Barnard College in 1908.

== Personal life ==
Strauss married three times. Her first marriage was to Dr. Lewis H. Marks in 1909. Marks was assistant to Paul Ehrlich at the Royal Institute for Experimental Therapy in Frankfurt-am-Main. Strauss's profile of Ehrlich was published in McClure's Magazine in 1910. In 1915, after the German war effort had taken over Marks' laboratory building for anti-aircraft purposes, the couple relocated to the Hotel Adlon in Berlin. During this time, they struck up a friendship with the American artist Marsden Hartley. In his correspondence with Alfred Stieglitz dating from the Spring of 1915, "Dr. and Mrs. Marks" are mentioned several times. In particular, he acknowledges in more than one of these letters their willingness to loan him funds. Due to wartime disruptions, Hartley was having difficulty receiving the "drafts" that were being provided to him by Stieglitz, in a timely manner. This left him no choice but to turn to friends like the Marks' for help. In addition, one of the letters tells how Strauss assisted with Hartley's "written matter". He explains to Stieglitz: (Mrs. Marks) "has been kind enough to typewrite a deal of it for me inasmuch as I couldn't go to a stenographer with it chiefly because I have to read it myself to the writer. It has no punctuation except the natural one of the rhythm it gets when it is read rightly and other characteristics that make it impossible to read with strangers."

Marks and Strauss divorce.

Her next marriage was to Karl-Ernst Matthias, and she began using the stage/pen name Rita Matthias. They too, divorce.

Her third and final marriage was to L. Walther Reil. For a time she went by the hyphenated Rita Matthias-Reil, and finally Rita Reil.

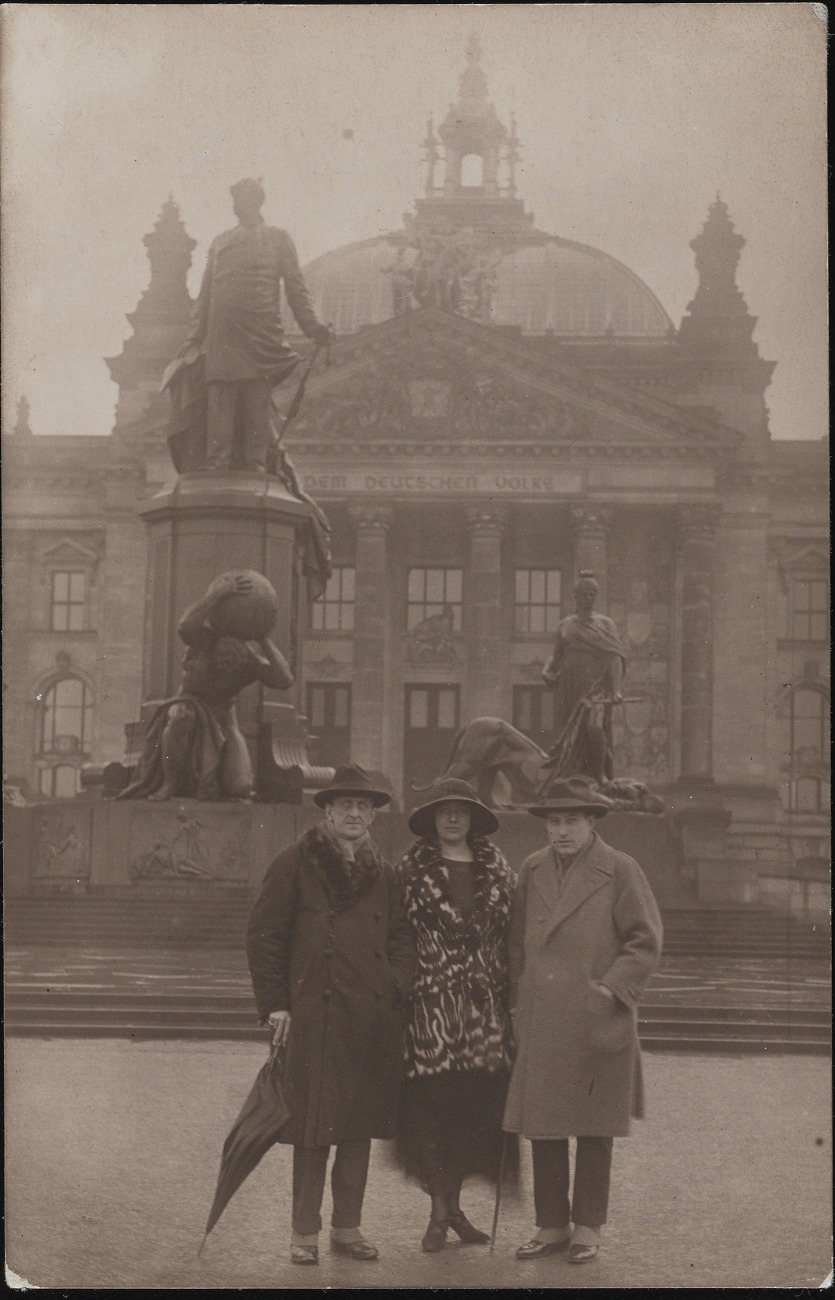
Rita Matthias with Marsden Hartley and Frank C. Davison. Berlin, 1922

In 1922, both Strauss and Hartley became acquainted with the Canadian writer Pierre Coalfleet, nom de plume of Frank Cyril Shaw Davison. Strauss (Rita Matthias) and Davison became frequent collaborators as translators of stage plays Over a 10 year period, they translated 58 plays, mostly from English into German. Forty-nine of them were produced.

In 1937, after Hitler's rise to power, Strauss returned to the United States.

The 1940 census finds her living with her husband and eight "lodgers" at 120 E. 34th Street in New York City.

== Professional life ==
Strauss's acting credits include appearances with the Provincetown Players and The Experimental Theatre Inc. in New York City, in 1923-24. In addition she performed in Europe, including at the Lessing Theatre in Berlin.

She transitioned to the translation of European drama, with a focus on the work of German Expressionism (see Expressionism (theatre)), translating works by Walter Hasenclever, Georg Kaiser, and Ferdinand Bruckner, among others. She partnered with C. Hooper Trask to form the eponymous theatrical publishing and licensing house Bühnen-Verlag Trask & Matthias, publishing acting editions of their own translations.

In 1927, Strauss was approached by an associate of Max Reinhardt, who commissioned her to translate Edgar Wallace's The Ringer, which was a hit on the London sage at the time. She entitled the German translation Der Hexer. The production at the Deutsches Theatre proved a success, and this led to a long string of Wallace translations, the novels and adaptations for the stage.

Strauss's 1937 contract with The Oxford University Press to translate Martin Gumpert's Dunant. Der Roman des Roten Kreuzes (Dunant: The Story of the Red Cross), resulted in her becoming a minor figure in the second of the Alger Hiss Trials. Her engagement with OUP was severed in March 1938, and the translator hired to replace her was Whittaker Chambers, a major player in the affair. The March 1938 time frame proved to be of particular significance at the perjury trial of Hiss.

In 1949, Rita Reil established her own literary agency in New York City specializing in foreign language books.

In 1953, she ran the International Press Alliance Corporation, in New York City. This was an American subsidiary of the Paris firm, Opera Mundi, the press agency founded by Paul Winkler in 1928.

== Late life ==
Rita Reil returned to Barnard College to tutor in French and German as a "labor of love" and was awarded Phi Beta Kappa "in recognition of her excellence."

She died in her sleep on June 25, 1961.

== Theater works ==
=== Acting credits ===
- The Spook Sonata by August Strindberg. Provincetown Playhouse 1923. Produced by Kenneth McGowan, Eugene O'Neill and Robert Edmond Jones. Appeared in the role of The Cook.
- George Dandin by Moliere. Produced by The Provincetown Players 1924. Appeared in the role of Claudine.
- The Ancient Mariner Based on the poem by Samuel Taylor Coleridge 1924 Produced by The Provincetown Players. Appeared in the role of Life-in-Depth.

=== Translations and adaptions ===
- The Flight to Venice: a play in 4 acts. Translation of Die Flucht nach Venedig by Georg Kaiser. Translated from the German, by Pierre Coalfleet and Rita Matthias, 1923.
- Beyond. Translation of Jenseits by Walter Hasenclever. Translated by Rita Matthias. Produced by The Experimental Theatre, Inc. Provincetown Playhouse. Directed by Harold McGee, 1925.
- Potasch und Perlmutter als Filmcompagnie. Translation of Potash and Perlmutter as a Film Company by Montague Glass and Jules Eckert Goodman. Translated by Rita Matthias and Wilhelm Auspitzer.
- Gier unter Ulmen: Ein Stück in drei Teilen. Translation of Desire Under the Elms by Eugene O'Neill. Translated by Rita Matthias and Konrad Maril.
- Alines Mann: Komödie in 3 Akten. Translation of Le Mari d'Alline: Comédie en Trois Actes by Fernand Nozières. Translated by Rita Matthias.
- Der Hexer. Translation of The Ringer by Edgar Wallace. Translated by Rita Matthias. Produced by Max Reinhardt's Deutsches Theater. Directed by Heinz Hilpert. 1926-27.
- U.S.A mit Musik. Translation of Crusade by Walter Lowenfels for music by George Antheil. Translated by Rita Matthias.
- Militärmusik: Ein Drama f. Patrioten. Translation of Spread Eagle: A Drama and A Fiction for Patriots by George S. Brooks and Walter B. Lister. Translated by Rita Matthias.
- Zaungäste. Translation of Outside Looking In by Maxwell Anderson. Translated by Rita Matthias.
- Die Poularde: Lustspiel in 3 Akten. Translation of The Butter and Egg Man by George S. Kaufman. Translated by Rita Matthias.
- Lockvögel: Ein Lustspiel in 3 Akten. Translation of Cradle Snatchers by Russel G. Medcraft and Norma Mitchell. Translated by Rita Matthias.
- Die Silberschur. Translation of The Silver Cord: A Comedy in Three Acts by Sidney Coe Howard. Translated by Rita Matthias.
- Goldstaub: Erzählung in drei Akten. Translation of Poudre d'Or: Conte en Trois Actes by René Trintzius and Amédée Valentin. Translated by Rita Matthias.
- Mary die Dritte: Komödie in drei Akten und einem Prolog. Translation of Mary the Third: A Comedy in Prologue and Three Acts by Rachel Crothers. Translated by Rita Matthias.
- Pastimes of an Empress. Translation of Die Spielereien einer Kaiserin by Max Dauthenday. Translated and adapted by Rita Matthias.
- The Criminals. Translation of Die Verbrecher by Ferdinand Bruckner. Translated by Edwin Denby and Rita Matthias. Produced by the Studio Theater 1941.
- Im Nebel von Cardiff. Translation of Bound East for Cardiff by Eugene O'Neill. Translated by Rita Matthias.
- Die weite Heimreise. Translation of The Long Voyage Home by Eugene O'neill. Translated by Rita Matthias.
- In der Zone. Translation of In the Zone by Eugene O'Neill. Translated by Rita Matthias.

== Other works ==
=== Translations ===
- Der Geist der Internationale in Bern. Translation of The Spirit of the International At Berne by John Wesley de Kay. Translated from the English by Carl-Ernst and Rita Matthias 1919.
- Changing Asia. Translation of Asien Gründlich Verändert by Egon Erwin Kisch, 1935
- Journey Into Freedom Translation of: Flucht in den Norden by Klaus Mann. Translated by Rita Reil 1936
- 'Goethe's Career as a Man of Letters' from Freud, Goethe, Wagner by Thomas Mann. Translated by Rita Matthias-Reil 1937
- Bridges Over the Rhine. Translatation of Ponts sur le Rhin by Ernst Erich Noth. Translated by Rita Reil and Hugh Corbett 1947

=== The novels of Edgar Wallace including ===
- Der Zinker: Ein Drama aus Scotland Yard. Translation of The Squeaker. Wilhelm Goldmann Verlag. Leipzig 1928
- Der Hexer. Translation of The Ringer. Wilhelm Goldmann Verlag. Leipzig 1928
- Der Grune Brand. Translation of The Green Rust. Wilhelm Goldmann Verlag. Leipzig 1929
- Nach Norden Strolch! Translation of The Northing Tramp. Wilhelm Goldmann Verlag. Leipzig 1930

=== Essays ===
- Paul Ehrlich: The Man and his Work. McClure's Magazine, 1911
- A New Theory of Acting. The Forum, 1923
