= Joseph Mayer Rice =

American physician

Joseph Mayer Rice (20 May 1857 - 24 June 1934) was a physician, editor of The Forum magazine, and early advocate of progressive education in the United States. He is credited with being one of the first to bring the need for widespread school reform to the public eye, and with laying the foundation for future empirical educational research.

== Early life ==
Rice was born in Philadelphia to Bavarian immigrant parents. His father, a private tutor, was Mayer Rice; his mother was Fanny Sohn. Rice attended Philadelphia schools until the age of 13, when his family moved to New York City.

In New York, Rice graduated from high school and enrolled in the City College of New York. He received his medical degree from the College of Physicians and Surgeons at Columbia University in 1881 and established a pediatric practice in 1884. His pediatric research into the New York City public school fitness programs sparked a lifelong investment in education and children's welfare.

== Travels in Germany (1888-1890) ==
Rice left his medical practice in 1888 for a two-year trip to Germany. He enrolled at Leipzig University, where he delved into experimental psychology and learned the foundations of empirical research in Wilhelm Wundt's laboratory, the first of its kind. At the University of Jena, he studied at the laboratory school, where he was introduced to Herbartism, or Johann Friedrich Herbart's philosophy of character-based education.

Along with his formal studies, Rice visited dozens of schools all around Europe. He focused his visits keenly on observing pedagogy as well as the structures of the schooling system. Upon his return to the U.S. in 1890, Rice was ready to draw on his experiences in Europe and advocate for his vision of the future of American elementary education.

== Writing and publishing ==
=== Early articles for The Forum ===
Rice's brother Isaac Leopold Rice was the owner of The Forum, a monthly magazine published in New York. Rice published his first Forum article in 1891, calling for better teacher training and a more "scientific" approach to education that incorporated developmental psychology as well as measurable student outcomes.

Rice subsequently undertook a sweeping six-month tour of U.S. schools in early 1892. He published his observations in nine Forum articles, criticizing schools for what he considered narrow, tedious, mechanical practices. Rice's critiques reached a wide audience and enraged many educators, bringing the question of schooling practices to the public.

=== The Public-School System of the United States (1893) ===
In 1893, Rice took another five-week tour of U.S. schools deemed to represent more progressive practices, in line with his vision for education. He wrote extensively on his visits to schools in Indianapolis, Minneapolis, St. Paul, La Porte, and Cook County, and was particularly impressed by Francis W. Parker's Cook County Normal School. He combined these observations with the original Forum articles for his first book, The Public-School System of the United States. The book made a passionate argument for schools designed to benefit the child through improved teacher training, eliminating rote and "mechanical" recitation-based teaching, elimination of political squabbling on boards of educations, and stronger instructional supervision from the superintendent.

=== Pioneering the comparative test ===
In February 1895, Rice launched one of the first comparative tests ever used in American education or psychology, a sixteen-month survey of almost 33,000 children between fourth and eight grade. Rice used this survey to collect data on school environments, children's nationality, and activities in school. Although not all educators were pleased with the results, Rice was widely acclaimed for this landmark early attempt to conduct an objective evaluation of education. In particular, he noted the "futility" of spelling drills, finding no correlation between the amount of drilling and spelling performance.

Findings from Rice's survey study went into his subsequent works, The Rational Spelling Book (1898) and Scientific Management in Education (1913).

=== Later writing ===
Rice assumed editorship of The Forum between 1897 and 1907, during which time it shifted from a monthly to a quarterly publication. In 1915, he retired to Philadelphia and published his final book, The People's Government.

== Educational legacy ==
There is a tremendous shift from Rice's 1893 work The Public School System of the United States, an impassioned condemnation of the lifelessness of schooling and his 1912 Scientific Management in Education which focused on the impassioned need for standardization and efficiency in the curriculum. According to Kliebard, "Rice's genuine dismay and disgust at was going on in American schools in the 1890s had evolved into a grim determination that teachers and administrators must be made to do the right thing." He shifted from a concern in the humanitarian research into the stages of childhood development to zealous advocacy for scientific management techniques to enforce efficiency in instruction.

For his work Rice has been credited as both the founder of progressive education as well as the father of educational research. He has also been described as an educational muckraker and a founder of the American testing movement.

== Family life ==
Rice married Deborah Levinson in 1900. They had a son, Lawrence Rice, and a daughter, Frances Rice. He died in Philadelphia on June 24, 1934.
