= Wilhelm August Lay =

German educationist (1862–1926)

Wilhelm August Lay (30 July 1862, Botzingen - 9 May 1926, Karlsruhe) was a German educator and psychologist who is considered one of the founders of experimental pedagogy. He is best known for his work on developing a scientific approach to education, based on empirical research and observation.

== Biography ==
Lay attended primary school, after which, respecting his father's wish that Lay should eventually take over the family farm, he enrolled in an agricultural school. However, he discontinued his education after a year because agriculture went against his own desires. Additionally, due to his advanced age, he was discouraged from attending a gymnasium. Consequently, he decided to become a primary school teacher. Lay completed the preparatory school in Gengenbach, the teacher training seminar in Karlsruhe, and from April 1883, he served as a junior teacher in Schriesheim.

In the fall of 1883, he took a leave of absence to prepare for the examination as a secondary school teacher at the Polytechnic in Karlsruhe and, in the last semester, at the University of Freiburg. In 1885, he passed the examination as a secondary school teacher with a focus on mathematics and natural sciences. Lay then spent a year studying at the University of Freiburg and Halle, where he showed interest in both natural and human sciences. He particularly emphasized his studies in the chemical laboratory and participation in scientific excursions. However, due to a severe lung disease, he did not complete his studies.

In 1886, he became a teacher in Freiburg, and in 1892, he became the head teacher at the Freiburg Girls' School. From 1893 until his retirement, he was a secondary school teacher at Teacher Seminar II in Karlsruhe, teaching natural sciences and agriculture. In the spring of 1903, he earned his doctorate under Alois Riehl at Friedrich University in Halle on the topic of "Experimental Didactics." Throughout his life, Lay remained a seminar teacher without administrative duties. However, in 1914, he became a senior secondary school teacher, and in 1920, at his insistence, he was appointed a professor. Despite this title, his professional responsibilities did not change. In 1924, due to the poor financial situation of the states, he was prematurely retired against his will.

== Contributions ==
In 1895 founded the journal "Zeitschrift für pädagogische Psychologie und experimentelle Pädagogik" (Journal of Educational Psychology and Experimental Pedagogy). This journal was one of the first to publish research on the psychology of education. Lay developed a scientific approach to education, believing that it should be based on empirical research and observation, rather than tradition or personal opinion. He also emphasized the importance of active learning, expressing the view that students should be encouraged to explore and discover their own knowledge, rather than simply being passive recipients of information. Lay also took care to ensure that teaching and education are based on the natural development of the child: he believed that teachers should use methods tailored to the individual needs of each student.

Lay believed that education should be based on the natural development of the child, and that teachers should use methods that are tailored to the individual needs of each student. He also emphasized the importance of active learning, and believed that students should be encouraged to explore and discover their own knowledge. Lay's work had a significant impact on the development of education in Germany and beyond. His ideas are still relevant today, and his contributions to the field of education continue to be studied and admired.

Lay's work has been criticized for being too focused on individual differences and for neglecting the importance of social and cultural factors in education. However, his contributions to the field of education are undeniable, and his ideas continue to be relevant today.

== Publications ==
- Psychologische Grundlagen des erziehenden Unterrichts und ihre Anwendung auf die Umgestaltung des Unterrichts in der Naturgeschichte. 1892.
- Führer durch den Rechtschreibunterricht. Gegründet auf psychologische Versuche und verbunden mit einer Kritik des ersten Sach- und Sprachunterrichts. 1896
- Methodik des naturgeschichtlichen Unterrichts und Kritik der Reformbestrebungen auf Grund der neueren Psychologie. 1899.
- Experimentelle Didaktik ihre Grundlegung mit besonderer Rücksicht auf Wille und Tat. 1903, 1920
- Führer durch den Rechenunterricht der Unterstufe gegründet auf didaktische Experimente. 1907.
- Experimentelle Pädagogik mit besonderer Rücksicht auf die Erziehung durch die Tat. 1908, 1912, 1918 Digitalisat
- With Max Enderlin: Führer durch das erste Schuljahr als Grundlage der Tatschule. 1911.
- Die Tatschule – eine natur- u. kulturgemäße Schulreform. 1911, 1921
- Lehrbuch der Pädagogik. 1912.
- Volkserziehung. 1921.
- Führer durch das erste Schuljahr als Grundlage der Tatschule. 1926.
- Die Lebensgemeinschaftsschule. 1927.
- Autobiografie in: Die Pädagogik der Gegenwart in Selbstdarstellungen,1927

== See also ==
- Pedagogy
- Experiment
