= Teacher look =

Classroom behaviour management technique

The "teacher look" is an emotionless, expressionless stare that primary school teachers are taught to direct towards misbehaving students as an alternative to yelling or threatening.

== Purpose ==
The purpose of the teacher stare is to stop simple disturbances from escalating, while minimizing disruption to the rest of the class. Educators say the teacher look is most effective with young and compliant students.

Other techniques teachers are taught to manage mild misbehaviour in the classroom include pausing for effect, thanking students who are behaving well, calling misbehaving students by name, moving physically nearer to sources of disruption, and gently reminding students what they are supposed to be doing.
