= Henry Goddard Leach =

American Scandinavian studies scholar and civic leader (1880–1970)

- Born: July 3, 1880; Philadelphia, U.S.
- Died: November 11, 1970 (aged 90); New York City, U.S.
- Education: Princeton University

Henry Goddard Leach (July 3, 1880 – November 11, 1970) was an American Scandinavian studies scholar and civic leader. He is best known as President of The American-Scandinavian Foundation and Professor of Scandinavian Civilization at the University of Kansas.

== Biography ==
Henry Goddard Leach was born in Philadelphia on July 3, 1880, to a family of English descent, the son of Dr. and Mrs. Alonzo L. Leach. He graduated from Princeton University in 1903, and then taught at Groton School for two years. One summer Leach accompanied the family of a pupil to Scandinavia as a tutor, during which he developed a lifelong fascination for the region.

Leach received his M.A. and Ph.D at Harvard University, the latter in 1908, after which he traveled to Denmark on a scholarship. Returning to the United States in 1910, Leach served as an English instructor at Harvard University for two years. In 1912 Leach became secretary of the recently established The American-Scandinavian Foundation, in which he quickly would play a leading role. He was Editor of The American-Scandinavian Review from 1913 to 1921. Leach resigned from the foundation in 1921, subsequently becoming curator of Scandinavian history and literature at Harvard University. In 1923, Leach became Editor of The Forum, a public-affairs monthly magazine with which he was associated until 1940. Leach returned to The American-Scandinavian Foundation in 1926, leading the foundation through the turbulent years of World War II.

Leach served as president of the Poetry Society of America from 1934 to 1937, and was rewarded upon his retirement with its medal for having established a fund to aid impoverished poets. He served as a member of the New York State Judicial Council from 1940 to 1950.

Leach resigned his presidency in The American-Scandinavian Foundation in 1947, subsequently becoming Professor of Scandinavian Civilization at the University of Kansas.

Leach was a trustee of the Council of Religious and International Affairs, and a Vice President of the American branch of PEN International, serving as a delegate at its international gatherings. He held honorary degrees from the colleges of Rollins, Augustana and Upsala, and the University of Uppsala. He was decorated by the governments of both Sweden, Norway, Iceland and Finland.

A frequent visitor to Scandinavia, Leach spoke both Danish, Norwegian and Swedish fluently. Tall, blue eyed and fair-haired, Leach was often mistaken for a Scandinavian, but was quick to emphasize his English ancestry. He was married to the former Agnes Lisle Brown, with whom he adopted a son, Jeffrey Eastman Fuller, and a daughter, Annis Leach.

The autobiography of Leach, My Last 70 Years, was published in 1956. He died at Regent Hospital, Manhattan on November 11, 1970. He was survived by his wife, daughter and six grandchildren.

== Selected bibliography ==
- Scandinavia of the Scandinavians, 1915
- Angevin Britain and Scandinavia, 1921
