= The Looking-Glass =

1943 novel by William March

- First edition
- Author: William March
- Language: English
- Genre: Novel
- Publisher: Little, Brown & Company (USA) & Victor Gollancz Limited (UK)
- Publication date: January 1943 (USA) & June 1944 (UK)
- Publication place: United States
- Media type: Print (hardback & paperback)
- Pages: 319 pp
- ISBN: 9780817358129
- Preceded by: The Tallons
- Followed by: October Island

The Looking-Glass is a 1943 novel by William March. A continuation of his "Pearl County" series of novels and short stories, it was originally titled Kneel to the Prettiest. The first two novels in the series are Come in at the Door and The Tallons.

== Plot summary ==
Set in the mythical town of Reedyville, Alabama, The Looking-Glass is a mosaic of multiple character stories and histories, interwoven in a non-linear fashion. It has been described as akin to the Spoon River style of storytelling with its multiple character studies.

== Reception ==
Contemporary reviews of the novel were mixed: "Approximately 55 percent of the reviews were unabashedly enthusiastic, several of them going so far as to suggest that it would prove to be the most distinguished novel to be published in the whole of 1943. Of the remaining 45 percent or so of the reviewers, approximately 15 percent wrote unfavorable pieces, while 30 percent were more or less indifferent to the book, ostensibly baffled by what was for them the obscurity of March's intent."

In a 1983 essay that describes March as "essentially a writer of short stories who also wrote novels", The Looking-Glass is identified as one of March's two best novels (the other being Company K), and described as "nine intricately threaded together character studies of short-story length plus a concluding chapter that pulls together the divergent narrative threads".

In a 2011 book-length study of March, Roy Simmonds describes it as his most ambitious novel and his finest literary achievement: "Despite its complex structure, it is the most perfectly integrated, both narratively and thematically, of all his full-length works."

== Editions ==
- 1943, USA, Little, Brown and Company, Pub date 6 January 1943, hardback
- 1944, UK, Victor Gollancz Limited, Pub date 26 June 1944, hardback
- 1953, USA, Bantam Books, Pub date February 1953, hardback
- 1955, USA, Popular Library, Pub date 1955, paperback
- 2015, USA, University of Alabama Press, Pub date 2015, paperback
