= Philip Beidler =

American literature professor and writer (1944–2022)

Philip Douglas Beidler (October 29, 1944 – April 20, 2022) was an American academic and author. He was a professor of American literature at the University of Alabama, and the author and editor of books on Alabama literature, the Vietnam War, and other topics. For his work on Vietnam writers, he has been called "one of the founding fathers of Vietnam War studies".

Beidler, who was of German and Quaker descent, was born on October 29, 1944, in Adams, Pennsylvania. He did his undergraduate studies at Davidson College. During 1969 and 1970, he served as a lieutenant in an armored cavalry platoon in Vietnam. He received master's and doctoral degrees in English from the University of Virginia—the latter in 1974.

He became a professor at the University of Alabama in the mid-1970s, served as director of graduate studies and as assistant dean, and was awarded the 1999 Burnum Distinguished Faculty Award. He was eventually named the Margaret and William Going Professor of English and, at the time of his death, he was a professor emeritus of English at the University of Alabama.

Beidler suffered from Parkinson's during the last years of his life. He died on April 20, 2022.

== Selected publications ==
=== Vietnam literature ===
- American literature and the experience of Vietnam. Athens: University of Georgia Press. 1982. ISBN 9780820306124.
- Re-writing America: Vietnam authors in their generation. Athens: University of Georgia Press. 1991. ISBN 9780820312644.
- Scriptures for a generation: What we were reading in the '60s. Athens: University of Georgia Press. 1994.
- Late thoughts on an old war: The legacy of Vietnam. Athens: University of Georgia Press. 2004.

=== Cultural history ===
- The victory album: Reflections on the good life after the good war, Tuscaloosa: University of Alabama Press, 2013, ISBN 9780817358457.
- The island called paradise: Cuba in history, literature, and the arts, Tuscaloosa: University of Alabama Press, 2014, ISBN 9780817318208.
- Beautiful war: Studies in a dreadful fascination, Tuscaloosa: University of Alabama Press, 2019, ISBN 9780817359614.

=== Alabama literature ===
- The art of fiction in the heart of Dixie: An anthology of Alabama writers, Tuscaloosa: University of Alabama Press, 1986, ISBN 978-0-8173-0313-6.
- Many voices, many rooms: a new anthology of Alabama writers, Tuscaloosa: University of Alabama Press, 1998, ISBN 978-0-8173-0867-4.
- First books: The printed word and cultural formation in early Alabama, Tuscaloosa: University of Alabama Press, 2012, ISBN 9780817357306.
