= Roy S. Simmonds =

English literary scholar and critic

Roy S. Simmonds (September 16, 1925 – November 10, 2001) was an English literary scholar and critic best known for his biographies of John Steinbeck, William March and Edward O'Brien.

== Works ==
- The Two Worlds of William March (1984).
- William March: An Annotated Checklist (1989).
- John Steinbeck: The War Years, 1939-1945 (1996).
- A Biographical and Critical Introduction of John Steinbeck (2000).
- Edward J. O’Brien and His Role in the Rise of the American Short Story in the 1920s and 1930s (2001).
