= The Forum (American magazine) =

1885–1950 American magazine

- First issue: March 1886; 140 years ago
- Final issue: 1950
- Company: Forum Publishing Company
- Country: United States
- Based in: New York City
- Language: English
- ISSN: 2160-8598

The Forum was an American magazine founded in 1885 by Isaac Rice. It existed under various names and formats until it ceased publication in 1950. Published in New York, its most notable incarnation (1885 until 1902) was symposium based. Articles from prominent guest authors debated all sides of a contemporary political or social issue, often across several issues and in some cases, several decades. At other times, it published fiction and poetry, and published articles produced by staff columnists in a "news roundup" format.

At its zenith, The Forum became one of the most respected journals in America, alongside Atlantic Monthly and Harper's Magazine. It was exceptional of these in several respects, as it carried a more Southern emphasis, and was also the only journal widely accessible to Black Americans. Its articles were of such reliably high standard that they were often used as resources for colleges and universities, with the articles studied in seminar discussions. Writing in 1957, Frank Luther Mott wrote:

It would be difficult to find a better exposition of the more serious interests of the American mind in the decade of 1886 to 1896 than is afforded by the first twenty volumes of The Forum...The Progress of science and industry, education in its many phases, religious controversy, and movements in literature and the fine arts gave variety to Forum content.

The Forum's first editor was Lorettus Sutton Metcalf, whose skills established the magazine's reputation for academic content. The magazine became more famous when Walter Hines Page, the noted publisher, took over as editor in 1891. Later editors included Isaac Rice's brother Joseph Mayer Rice (a notable reform figure in the Progressive Era), Frederick Taber Cooper, and Henry Goddard Leach, who resumed the symposium format in 1923.

== Editors ==
Editors of The Forum were as follows:

- Lorettus Sutton Metcalf (1886–91)
- Walter Hines Page (1891–95)
- Alfred Ernest Keet (1895–97)
- Joseph Mayer Rice (1897–1907)
- Frederic Taber Cooper (1907–09)
- Benjamin Russell Herts (1909–10)
- Mitchell Kennerley (1910–16)
- H. Thompson Rich (1917–18)
- Edward Wildman (1918–20)
- George Henry Payne (1920–23)
- Henry Goddard Leach and Frank C. Davidson (1923–26)
- Henry Goddard Leach (1926–40)
- Daniel George Redmond (1945–50)

== Early years: Walter Hines Page 1886–95 ==
Rice founded The Forum as a wedding gift to his wife Julia Hyneman Barnett. A German immigrant musician, Rice had enrolled at Columbia University School of Law in 1878, and after graduating in 1880, became the librarian of Columbia’s new School of Political Science. From 1884, he taught classes in the law school, but after he began to practice law, he resigned from teaching. As a lawyer specializing in monopolies and patents, he began to invest in the railroad industry, and then the Electric Storage Battery Company, of which he became president in 1897.

Rice was also a writer. In 1875, he released "What is Music?", a slim volume that analysed various theories of music from across the globe, and attempted to create a cosmical theory of music based upon current knowledge. "By listening to a great composition," he wrote, "our mind undergoes the same process - first the mood, then the sentiment, then the definite thought. This order is characteristic of the perception of the beautiful in nature."

An infrequent contributor to the journal, Isaac Rice chose topics that were nonetheless eclectic. They include:

1. July 1892: The Consumer
2. October 1893: Public Business and the Right to Steal
3. August 1894: Legalized Plunder of Railroad Properties: The Remedy
4. March 1912: Every Man is His Own Banker

In its first year, the magazine had survived on a subscription circulation of around 2,000. Walter Hines Page joined the journal the following year as the new business manager, and quickly transformed its scope and ambition. Throwing himself and his personality into the work, he became critical of board members who thought that it was beneath the dignity of the journal to directly solicit manuscripts from major writers focused on contemporary issues. Page recruited a slew of celebrity experts and well known authorities – including Congressmen – in order to attract more readers. Their work, focused on national and international events, added a large degree of timeliness to its content.

Above all, Page was concerned with the state of the nation in the post Civil War period – the political landscape was dominated by the "boss system" of party political patronage, with underqualified and corrupt candidates elected to serve the local financial and industrial interests. He held hope that Grover Cleveland would signal a reformation of that system into a higher state of honesty, frugality, and sound financial policy, yet he was disappointed by Cleveland himself, who he saw as "plodding," "unimaginative," and "unaware of the forces changing the nation."

Page relinquished the editorship in 1895, over a squabble regarding control, and was hired by Houghton, Mifflin and Company, the publishers of Atlantic Monthly. A few months later he left, believing he was inadequately paid, and after a brief period working at the Harper Publishing House, he formed Doubleday, Page and Company, publishers of a new periodical, The World's Work.

=== Joseph Mayer Rice and educational reform ===
At various points in its history, The Forum concerned itself with issues surrounding the education system in America, specifically the curriculum. From January through October 1888, The Forum ran a symposium series entitled “What Shall the Public Schools Teach”, which included contributions from William T. Harris and Lester Frank Ward. Along with Rice, Ward became a major figure in the Progressive Education movement.

The Forum made its definitive statement of the education system in 1891–93 when it published a series of incisive muckraking articles by Joseph Mayer Rice. From 1888 to 1890 Rice had studied psychology and pedagogy in the German Universities of Jena and Leipzig, and had studied under Wilhelm Rein, an influential educational theorist. Rein proposed a philosophy of education that placed greater emphasis on the building of moral character over the consumption of facts.

Rice came to write for The Forum due to Page's interest in Rice's ideas about pedagogy, and the journal sponsored him as he conducted a six-month tour of thirty-six cities in the United States. He visited six to eight urban public elementary schools in each city, and spent the school hours of every day observing classroom events. He talked with approximately twelve hundred teachers, met with school officials and school board members, interviewed parents, and visited twenty teacher-training institutions.

Rice devoted the summer of 1892 to the analysis of data from his survey of schools. From October 1892 through June 1893, The Forum published a series of nine articles by Rice, where he reported tedious, pedantic teaching in traditionally structured schools, unassisted superintendents responsible for the supervision of hundreds of teachers, and board of education reports portraying deplorable conditions of schools. As anticipated by Page, Rice's study generated outraged reactions among a public that heretofore had assumed a fully functioning and effective educational system. Rice's articles earned him a reputation (not a pleasant one among many professional educators) for bringing the topic of schooling into the public's eye, and, in effect, introducing muckraking to the field of education.

The nine articles that Rice wrote for The Forum chart an exhaustive tour of public schools from the East Coast to the Midwest taken from December 1891 through first half of 1892. His criticisms mobilised parents against corrupt politicians, particularly after the articles were published in a collection called The Public School System of the United States, which incorporated the original tour with a second survey undertaken in the spring of 1894, mainly of schools that had reformed their curriculum. "It is indeed incomprehensible," he wrote, "that so many loving mothers...are willing without hesitation to resign the fate of their little ones to the tender mercies of ward politicians, who in many instances have no scruples in placing the children in class-rooms the atmosphere of which is not fit for human beings to breathe, and in charge of teachers who treat them with a degree of severity that borders on barbarism."

The articles published by Rice in this time include:

1. December 1891: Need School be a Blight to Child Life?
2. October 1892: Our Public School System: Evils in Baltimore
3. November 1892: Our Public School System: Schools of Buffalo and Cincinnati
4. December 1892: The Public Schools of St. Louis and Indianapolis
5. January 1893: The Public School System of New York City
6. February 1893: The Public Schools of Boston
7. June 1893: Our Public School System: A Summary
8. December 1893: A Plan to Free the Schools From Politics

Rice returned to the University of Jena in the summer of 1893, returning the following year. Upon his return, he was determined to further document his conviction that a Progressive education was beneficial for students. He embarked on another Forum-sponsored tour in 1895, armed with a survey which he administered to nearly 33,000 young students. In particular, Rice found no link between the time spent on spelling drills and students' performance on spelling tests. His study was far ahead of its time, both in the subject of pedagogy and overall methodology.

Articles referring to this later study include:

1. June 1895: A Rational Correlation of School Studies
2. August 1895: Substitution of Teacher for Text-Book
3. December 1896: How Shall the Child be Taught? Obstacles to Rational Educational Reform
4. January 1896: How Shall the Child be Taught? The Essentials in Elementary Education
5. August 1897: The Futility of the Spelling Grind I
6. June 1897: The Futility of the Spelling Grind II

=== American imperialism ===
From 1898 to 1900, The Forum analysed the implications of the United States' flirtation with imperialism in Guam, the Philippines, China and Puerto Rico. Several of the articles paid reference to the "Open Door Policies" of U.S. Secretary of State John Hay. Composed in 1899, the policy allowed multiple imperial powers to access China without committing to direct control, as was the case with Great Britain in India. Though treaties made after 1900 refer to the open door, competition for access to China continued. The term is now more commonly associated with the historian William Appleman Williams, who used it to refer to U.S. economic imperialism in the developing world.

Articles on these issues include:

1. January 1898: China, and the Chinese Railway Concessions by Clarence Cary
2. March 1898: The Duty of Annexing Hawaii by Senator John T. Morgan
3. June 1898: The War for Cuba by Joseph Edgar Chamberlain
4. July 1898: The Philippine Islands by Frank F. Hilder
5. November 1898: Shall we Keep the Philippines? by Charles Demby
6. February 1899: Coaling Stations for the Navy by R.B.Bradford
7. April 1899: American Opportunities in China by Gilbert Reid
8. November 1899: How Shall Puerto Rico be Governed? by H. K. Carrol

=== Lynching ===
Lynching of Black Americans was an issue that was discussed several times, though The Forum never took a definitive line for or against the practice.

In November 1893, Walter Hines Page wrote in "The Last Hold of the Southern Bully" that lynching was a social crime unheard of during the era of slavery, and was something that society should be spared from, due to its inflammable nature. Using the example of a sexual offense committed by a black man on a white woman, Page asked why black offenders were dealt with so severely when similar crimes committed by white men against black women were regarded as venial offenses. The answer was to build a social and political alliance between state conventions, ecclesiastical organisations and the media to defeat the evil practice. "It is the vast majority of good men, law-loving men who make up these organisations, and it is they who must defend themselves from the dangerous savagery of the smaller number who regard it as a manly thing to take the law into their own hands."

Other writers took differing stances on the issue. Atticus G. Heygood, a noted Methodist scholar, supporter of emancipation and author of Our Brother in Black: His Freedom and His Future (1881), contributed "The Black Shadow on the South", in which he stated that the most alarming fact about lynching was that the practice had ceased to alarm the public. "In a civilised society...lynching is a crime against God and man...lynching is anarchy." On the other side of the issue, Chas Smith asked in October 1893: "Have American Negroes too Much Liberty?"

Other articles to discuss lynching and violence against Blacks include:

1. November 1893: Negro Outrage No Excuse For Lynching by L. E. Bleckley
2. September 1894: The Lessons of Recent Civil Disorders by Thomas M. Cooley
3. January 1899: The Race War in North Carolina
4. December 1926: Symposium: Is Lynching Ever Defensible? I. The Motives of Judge Lynch] by George W. Chamlee

II. The Mind of the Lynching Mob by John P. Fort

== Decline: Alfred Ernest Keet and Joseph Mayer Rice 1895–1907 ==
Following the departure of Page, Alfred Ernest Keet spent a short period as editor from 1895-1897 before he was replaced by Joseph Mayer Rice, who served until 1907. Around 1900, circulation began to decline and the choice was made in July 1902 to make the magazine a quarterly. The essays were gone, replaced by a sectional format with regular contributors. Notable contributors were Henry Litchfield West, on “American Politics” Ossian H. Lang on “Educational Outlook” and Alexander D. Noyes, who later served as financial reporter for The New York Times, on “Finance.”

=== Black American contributors ===
By the turn of the century, The Forum had garnered a reputation for soliciting more articles from Black American contributors than any other magazine. Contributors included Booker T Washington, William Scarborough of Wilberforce University and author of The Future of the Negro (1889) Edward T Blyden, a Liberian politician, Professor Kelly Miller of Howard University, President J C Price of Livingstone College, and William Hooper Councill.

Articles included:

1. December 1898: The Educated Negro and Menial Pursuits] by William Scarborough
2. July 1898: The Future of the Negro by William Hooper Councill
3. May 1901: The Negro and Our New Possessions by William Scarborough
4. February 1901: The Negro and Education] by Kelly Miller
5. February 1902: The Expansion of the Negro Population] by Kelly Miller

Walter Hines Page was a huge supporter of Booker T Washington. Like many of the writers at The Forum, Washington stated that industrial education was required to further the progress of Black Americans. A few days before he died in 1916, Washington wrote to The Forum suggesting an article dealing with "the definitive, indisputable facts relating to the Negro's progress as a race.' His death meant the article was never completed, but Washington did send notes, which were published in the March 1916 issue under the title Fifty Years of Negro Progress. In various areas, from literacy, to business, to health and standards of living, Washington saw a race that had made significant strides. He concluded: "Often I feel proud that I belong to a race in America which can never hope to be superior to the races about it in physical power; but whose growth must be in matters of the spirit and the ever-increasing success which attends such growth... are making the Negro into that fine type of citizen who may yet become the conservator of the finest and best of real civilization."

=== Contributions from Theodore Roosevelt ===
In the history of the magazine, four future presidents wrote articles for The Forum. Of note are Woodrow Wilson’s articles, given his friendship and future association with Page. But it is Theodore Roosevelt, who contributed half a dozen articles between 1893 and 1895, who provides the most interesting and idiosyncratic articles, particularly in two articles that celebrate the virtues of masculinity.

In August 1893's “Big Game Disappearing in the West”, Roosevelt boasts of his prowess as a hunter, and describes a series of potential American hunting experiences in vivid detail. “It has been my good luck to kill every kind of game properly belonging to the United States [but] I have never seen a grisly roped by the riders of the plains, nor a black bear killed with the knife and hounds in the southern canebrakes.” However, he also warned that though hunting is a noble and masculine pursuit, it should not be abused. Identifying the overhunting of cattle near his ranch in Little Missouri, he stated: “It is always lawful to kill dangerous or noxious animals, like the bear, cougar and wolf; but other game should only be shot when there is a need of the meat.”

Echoing his subsequent success as President in allocating land for forest conservation and preservation, Roosevelt concluded his article with a demand: “We need, in the interest of the community at large, a rigid system of game laws,” and to “establish, under the control of the State, great national forest reserves, which shall also be a breeding-grounds and nurseries for wild game; though I should much regret to see grow up in this country a system of large private game-preserves kept for the enjoyment of the very rich.”

In July 1894's “The Manly Virtues and American Politics”, Roosevelt described the corrupt politician as a greater foe of the nation than the private trusts and monopolies. The correct attitude of citizen who wished to commit to public life was disinterestedness, honesty, and above all, efficiency. He must be willing to meet men of far lower ideals than his own, and to act with them rather than criticise. “It is not the man who sits by his fireside reading his evening paper and saying how bad our politics and politicians are who will ever do anything to save us; it is the man who goes out into the rough hurly-burly of the caucus...and faces his fellows on equal terms.”

Just as important was to encourage the citizen to work for good government as a means to itself, rather than material gain. To do this, citizens should be pressed to political involvement as a matter of plain duty. A righteous man “must do his share, unless he is willing to prove himself unfit for free institutions, fit only to live under a government where he will be plundered and bullied...on account of his selfish timidity.”

In April 1894, "What 'Americanism' Means" emphasised how strong the emotion of patriotism could be, and that it was the responsibility of the truest Americans were those who protected patriotism from those who used it as a cloak for evil - “the class of hypocrites and demagogues, the class that is always prompt to steal the watchwords of righteousness and use them in the interests of evil doing.”

True patriotism was neither foolish optimism, nor ignoble pessimism, but a sober acceptance of the many advantages America held. It was a question of spirit of convictions and purpose, not a creed or birthplace. A vigilant defense against the forces of separatism was required - be they found in small minded provincial patriotism, a complete absence of patriotism, or the subversion of patriotism by those immigrants who choose not to integrate themselves in the American community. “A Scandinavian, a German, or an Irishman who has really become an American has the right to stand on exactly the same footing as any native born citizen...we must stand shoulder to shoulder, not asking as to the ancestry or creed of our comrades, but only demanding that they be in very truth Americans, ad that we all work together, heart, hand and head, for the honour and greatness of our common country.”

Other articles written by Roosevelt:

1. February 1895: True American Ideals
2. September 1895: The Enforcement of Law
3. December 1895: Thomas Brackett Reed and the Fifty-First Congress

== Resurgence: Frederick Taber Cooper and Mitchell Kennerley 1907–16 ==
In 1908, The Forum returned to monthly publication and expanded its format to include fiction, poetry and reviews. Early work by Sherwood Anderson, H.L. Mencken and Edna St. Vincent Millay appeared. Readership gradually increased. In 1909, Rice resigned. His successor, Frederick Taber Cooper opened the magazine to outside reviews and further expanded its literary offerings.

The first novella to appear was The Point of Honor: A Military Tale by Joseph Conrad, author of Heart of Darkness, The Outcast of the Islands and The Secret Agent. From that point, The Forum attracted contributions from some of the most distinguished authors and playwrights of the day, including Thomas Hardy, Jules Verne, and H. G. Wells.

Notable contributions include:

1. January 1912: A Honeymoon Christmas by Marian Cox
2. May 1913: The Holy Man by Frank Harris
3. December 1915: The Free Vacation House by Anzia Yezierska
4. May 1916: The Magical City (A Play) by Zoe Akins
5. June 1916: Blackfoot's Masterpiece by Sherwood Anderson
6. October 1924 - April 1924: Soundings (Seven Parts) by Arthur Hamilton Gibbs
7. December 1925: The Pearl of Love by H. G. Wells
8. April 1930: "A Rose for Emily" by William Faulkner

=== Journalists ===
In this era, The Forum also accepted contributions from prominent journalists and critics, including a number of articles from G.K Chesterton and Upton Sinclair, and early career articles from Walter Lippmann and Henry Mencken. Lippmann's first contributions were three articles of political analysis published in early 1913: The Taboo in Politics, The Changing Focus in Politics and For Theorists. Mencken's contribution were slight by comparison, consisting of a review of Willard Huntington Wrights A Man of Promise in April 1916 entitled America Produces a Novelist.

=== Coolidge, Harding and Hoover ===
In January 1920, Calvin Coolidge stated that politics was a means to an end, a process rather than a product. Like all other values, it had its chimeras, but it was an ultimately noble profession. As a consequence, public confidence in government was a matter of great concern, and the differentiation between partisan assertions and reality had to be made clear. “No system of government can stand that lacks public confidence, and no progress can be made on the assumption of false premise".

Shortly before he was elected President, Harding mused upon the responsibilities of the office. “My Americanism” read like a contract to the American people. Along with the usual pleas to embrace representative government over dictatorship and special interests, he stated that to make false appeals would rob the nation of its dignity, and would drag the attention of the American people into the mire. “As I see it, if I were to stoop to insincerity, to mere clamour, to political expediency, to appeals to special classes, I would be failing in that purpose which I trust shall always be mine: not my own interest, not even the interest of my party first, but America First.”

While serving as the head of the American Relief Administration, Herbert Hoover contributed “The Food Future” which highlighted contemporary issues in the American food supply chain, particularly food shortages and price inflation. He also outlined American responsibilities to a recovering Europe. “There are millions of people now liberated from the German yoke,” he wrote, “for whose interests we have fought and bled for the last eighteen months. We dare not neglect any measure which enables them to return to health, to self-support and to their national life.” The following year, he reiterated that American aid should continue until European nations were able to perform the whole task of feeding their people themselves.

== Commercial peak: Henry Goddard Leach 1926–45 ==
By the 1920s, pro and con articles on contemporary issues returned. Subjects included communism, religious fundamentalism, and military preparedness. Circulation reached 90,000 by the end of the decade. In 1930, The Forum merged with Century Magazine, to add an upper class element to attract advertisers. Forum and Century provided articles on cures to the economic situation during the Great Depression, including a notable article by John Maynard Keynes "Causes of World Depression", published in 1931, years before his ideas came into vogue. Charles Beard, the father of the Progressive School of History, contributed an article entitled "A Five-Year Plan for America", an article advocating national economic planning. At the same time, the Swope Plan, and other economic policies, were debated at length.

== The end 1945–50 ==
By mid-1940, circulation had dropped to about 35,000, prompting a sale to Current History Magazine. After another transfer a few years later, another name change, and a re-appearance under its original title, The Forum closed in 1950.
