= University of Alabama Press =

Publishing arm of the University of Alabama

- Parent company: University of Alabama
- Founded: 1945; 81 years ago
- Founder: James Benjamin McMillan
- Country of origin: United States
- Headquarters location: Tuscaloosa, Alabama
- Distribution: Chicago Distribution Center (USA) University of British Columbia Press (Canada) RTM Asia-Pacific Book Marketing Eurospan Group (EMEA)
- Publication types: Books, Journals
- No. of employees: 18
- Official website: UAPress.ua.edu

The University of Alabama Press is a university press founded in 1945 and is the scholarly publishing arm of the University of Alabama. An editorial board composed of representatives from all doctoral degree granting public universities within Alabama oversees the publishing program. Projects are selected that support, extend, and preserve academic research. The Press also publishes books that foster an understanding of the history and culture of this state and region. The Press strives to publish works in a wide variety of formats such as print, electronic, and on-demand technologies to ensure that the works are widely available.

The University of Alabama Press publishes in a variety of subject areas, including anthropology and archeology, biography and memoir, the Civil Rights movement, fiction, food and agriculture, gender and sexuality studies, the history of medicine, Judaism and Holocaust studies, Latin American and Caribbean studies, language and linguistics, law and legal studies, literary criticism, military studies and military history, Native American studies, nature, religion, rhetoric, and sports.

As the only academic publisher for the state of Alabama, The University of Alabama Press has in the past undertaken publishing partnerships with such institutions as the Birmingham Museum of Art and Samford University, and The College of Agriculture, the Jule Collins Smith Museum of Fine Art, and the Caroline Marshall Draughon Center for the Arts & Humanities at Pebble Hill at Auburn University. It serves as the publisher of the Fiction Collective Two (FC2) imprint for experimental fiction.

== History ==
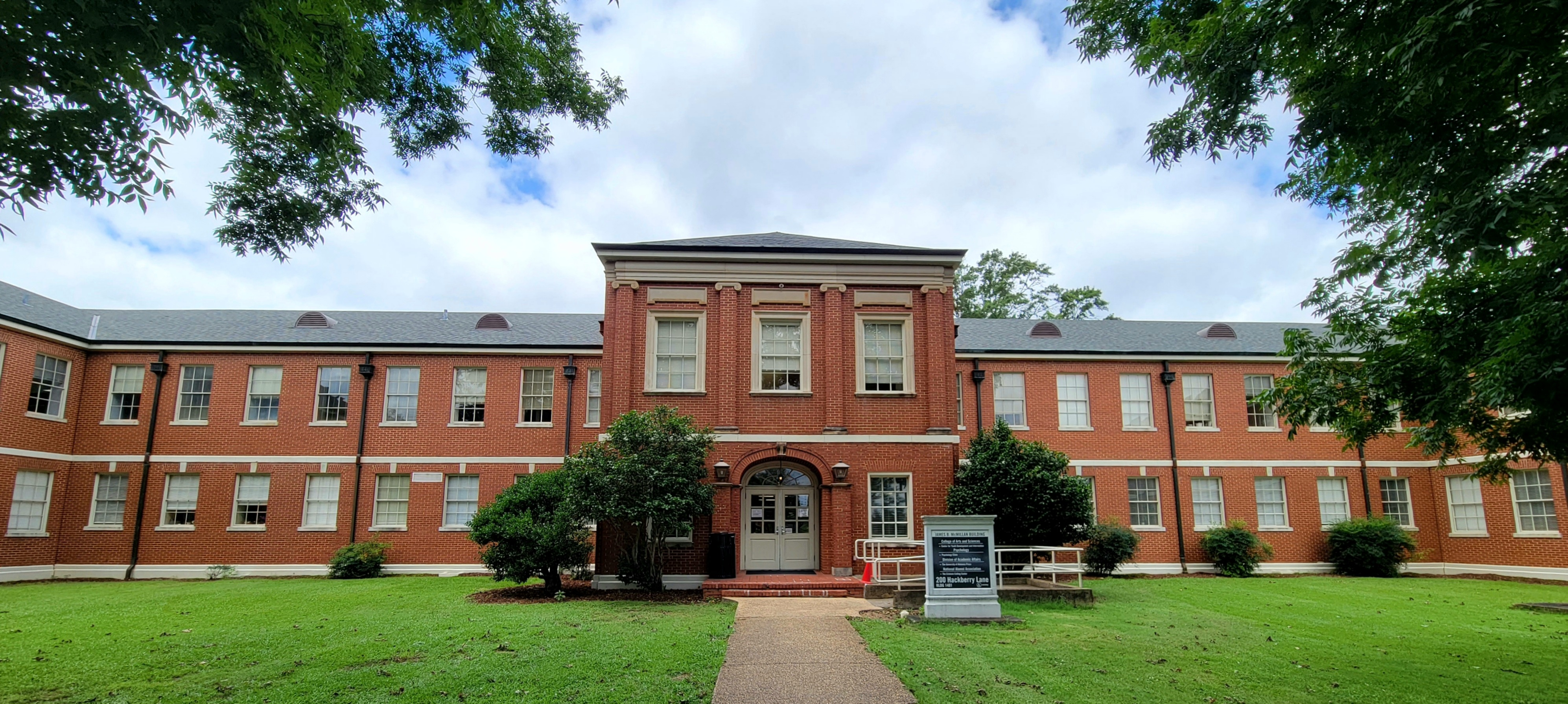
James B. McMillan Building houses the offices of UAP.

The University of Alabama Press was founded in the fall of 1945 with James Benjamin McMillan as founding director. The Press's first work was Roscoe C. Martin's New Horizons in Public Administration, which appeared in February 1946. In 1964, the Press joined the organization now known as the Association of University Presses.

In January, 2023, the University of Alabama Press joined the University of Alabama Libraries.

It was awarded the General Basil W. Duke Award from the Military Order of the Stars and Bars for its re-publication of Marcus B. Toney's Civil War memoir, The Privations of a Private, in 2006.

== Journals ==
The University of Alabama Press publishes Theatre History Studies, the journal of the Mid-America Theatre Conference. It also publishes Theatre Symposium, an annual scholarly publication featuring papers presented at the annual two-day conference of the Southeastern Theatre Conference.

== See also ==
- List of English-language book publishing companies
- List of university presses
