= Larry Levenson =

American club owner (1936–1999)

- Born: 1936; New York City, New York, U.S.
- Died: January 23, 1999 (aged 62–63); New York City, New York, U.S.
- Other names: The King of Swing
- Occupation(s): Club owner, swinger

Larry Levenson (1936 – January 23, 1999) was an American club owner who founded the swingers club Plato's Retreat.

== Biography ==
Levenson started working in the service industry but encountered the swinging life and found a new calling. He opened his first swingers club in a basement of a small hotel on East 23rd Street, and soon moved to The Ansonia, replacing the hotel's basement Continental Baths. His goal was to bring "to the straight world the liberty of the gay clubs."

In 1980, he moved the club's location again to West 34th Street and announced his intention to create a chain of Plato's clubs.

Levenson was sentenced to eight years in prison in 1981 for tax evasion.

After the closing of Plato's Retreat, he worked as a cab driver.

He died in 1999 after quadruple bypass heart surgery.

Levenson was featured in the 2008 documentary American Swing. Nicknamed the 'King of Swing', he claimed having sexual relations with 10 different women in one night, and once won a bet against Al Goldstein that he could ejaculate fifteen times within a twenty-four-hour day.

== Filmography ==
- American Swing (2008), directed by directed by Matthew Kaufman, documentary about the 1970s phenomenon of swinging at Plato's Retreat in New York City
