= Steve Ostrow =

American businessman and LGBTQ rights activist (1932–2024)

- Born: September 16, 1932; Brooklyn, New York, U.S.
- Died: February 4, 2024 (aged 91); Sydney, New South Wales, Australia
- Occupations: Businessman; LGBT rights activist

Steve Ostrow (September 16, 1932 – February 4, 2024) was an American businessman, LGBTQ rights activist, and opera performer who was the founder of the well-known New York City gay establishment Continental Baths.

== Early life ==
Ostrow was born in Brooklyn, New York, on September 16, 1932. His father, Louis Ostrow, was Russian-born and worked in advertising and layout in the magazine and newspaper publishing industry. His mother was Nettie (Cooper) Ostrow. Ostrow's education included studying voice at the Henry Street Settlement in Manhattan. His father died of cancer when he was 18.

== Career ==
While working for a loan company, he joined a small opera company. There he met Joanne King, his co-star in “La Bohème”; they married in 1960. Mr. Ostrow then started his own loan company in 1966, and the couple moved to Matawan, N.J., where he was president and cantor of their local Reform temple. Two years later, he recalled in his memoir, he saw an ad in The Times asking for investors to open a men's health club and steam bath. His father-in-law lent him the money. Ostrow started Continental Baths in 1968. He had Bette Midler perform at his Continental Baths on the weekends. Continental Baths became a huge success but eventually faded and closed in 1976. The basement was taken over by new investors as Plato's Retreat and is now a parking garage.

Ostrow went on to sing and perform with various operas such as the New York City Opera, the San Francisco Opera, the Stuttgart Opera, and the Australian Opera companies in New York City, San Francisco, California, Germany, and Australia respectively.

Ostrow lived in Australia from the late 1980s onwards where he became a vocal coach director of the Sydney Academy of Vocal Arts. He also founded a support group called Mature Age Gays during his time living in Australia. He was the recipient of the Medal of the Order of Australia in 2021 for his service to the LGBTQ community and the performing arts.

In 1966, Ostrow was charged with mail fraud for lending practices at his loan company.

Ostrow's memoir was called Live at The Continental.

== Personal life ==
Ostrow worked for a loan company and he had also joined an opera company where he met Joanne King who was his co-star in La Bohème. He married King in 1960. He and his wife mostly lived apart after the Baths opened and divorced in the early 1980s. Joanne Ostrow became an Episcopal deacon and served as police chaplain for the Los Angeles Police Department. She died in 2001. Steve Ostrow died at a Sydney retirement home on February 4, 2024, at the age of 91. Ostrow was survived by his children, Scott Ostrow and Maria Jaul, as well as five grandchildren and three great-grandchildren.
