= Continental (film) =

- Directed by: Malcolm Ingram
- Written by: Malcolm Ingram
- Produced by: Malcolm Ingram
- Cinematography: Jonathon Cliff; Andrew MacDonald
- Edited by: Sean Stanley
- Release date: 2013
- Country: United States
- Language: English

Continental is a 2013 documentary film, directed by Malcolm Ingram, about the history of the Continental Baths, a historic gay bathhouse in New York City. It is also, notably, Ingram's first film since 1999's Tail Lights Fade not to have Kevin Smith as a co-producer. The film was funded with help from Kickstarter.

Prominent figures appearing in the film, either in archival footage or in new interviews, include Jaye P. Morgan, Holly Woodlawn, Michael Musto, Frankie Knuckles, Bette Midler and Sarah Dash.

The film premiered at the SXSW festival on March 10, 2013.
