= Doug Langway =

American screenwriter and director (died 2022)

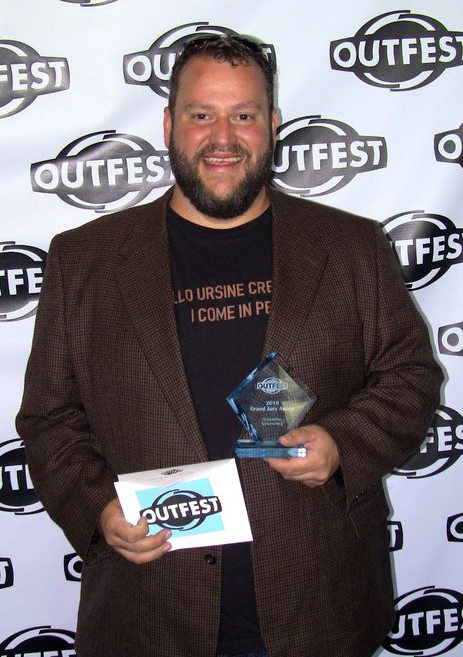
Langway in 2010

Douglas Langway (October 5, 1970 – October 9, 2022) was an American screenwriter and film director, best known for his film trilogy BearCity, BearCity 2: The Proposal, and Bear City 3. His first feature film, Raising Heroes, was released in 1996.

Langway was the president and CEO of Sharpleft Studios, and along with his long-term business partner Henry White (COO of Sharpleft Studios,) they ran a media and marketing firm which also served as the production studio for the BearCity films. He was openly gay. He also appeared as himself in Malcolm Ingram's 2010 documentary film Bear Nation, and was a producer of Ingram's 2015 documentary film Out to Win.

Doug died on October 9, 2022, from liver cancer. He was 52 years old.
