= Faith Based (film) =

2020 comedy film directed by Vincent Masciale

- Film poster
- Directed by: Vincent Masciale
- Written by: Luke Barnett
- Produced by: Luke Barnett
- Starring: Luke Barnett; Tanner Thomason; Margaret Cho; David Koechner; Lance Reddick; Jason Alexander
- Cinematography: Will Stone
- Edited by: J. Patrick Southern
- Music by: Dustin Morgan
- Distributed by: Gravitas Ventures
- Release dates: January 18, 2020 (Santa Barbara); October 9, 2020
- Running time: 92 minutes
- Country: United States
- Language: English

Faith Based is a 2020 American comedy film from director Vincent Masciale, written, produced and starring Luke Barnett. The film also stars Tanner Thomason, Margaret Cho, David Koechner, Lance Reddick, and Jason Alexander. The story is about two clueless friends who decide that making a faith based film would be a good get-rich-quick scheme.

== Plot ==
Childhood friends Luke and Tanner, now both in their 30s, live together in a rental home in Reseda, where they smoke copious amounts of marijuana. Luke's adoptive father Mike, who is a church pastor, berates Luke for his lack of motivation, despite being in jeopardy of losing his own church. Pastor Mike observes that some churches have found financial success by producing faith-based films. This gives Luke the idea to make a Christian film of his own and use the profits to save Mike's church.

Luke and Tanner take a meeting with Jane, the head of acquisitions for ChristFlix, a distributor of Christian films. Jane explains the specific formula for a successful Christian film: an openly Christian star, Christian terminology in the title, a peril-driven plot, and discussion of Christian themes. Luke and Tanner decide to call their film A Prayer in Space, about an astronaut trapped on Mars and praying for rescue, thus making him the first person to pray outside of Earth. They recruit Butch Savage, an actor whose career in action films is on the decline, to play God.

== Cast ==
- Luke Barnett as Luke
- Tanner Thomason as Tanner
- Lance Reddick as Pastor Mike
- Jason Alexander as Nicky Steele
- Margaret Cho as Jane
- David Koechner as Butch Savage
- Christoph Sanders as Hoyt
- Carly Craig as Brandy
- Richard Riehle as Herman
- Danielle Nicolet as Tiffany
- Lisa Schwartz as Lisa
- Chris Marquette as Hans
- Danny Woodburn as Jimmy
- David Ury as Gerry
- Ashlynn Yennie as Ashlynn
- Mark Borchardt as Mark
- Nadia Bjorlin as Katie

== Production ==
After Barnett and Masciale made their first film together and it premiered at Tribeca, they had hoped to be able to get studio funding to make another film, but spent two years unsuccessfully pitching ideas. When the faith based film God's Not Dead 3 came out, Barnett joked "we should just make a Christian movie, and use the proceeds to make our stuff." Barnett started writing in December 2018 and completed the script by February 2019, and started shooting in May. The film was made on a very low budget, and financed off of credit card borrowing. Filming locations included their own homes and the homes of family and friends, as well as the bar where they use to work at, and a local church they use to attend also. The film was shot in 15 days, across a dozen locations.

For the role of Butch Savage, they had originally wanted to cast an actual '80s action star in the role, but rewrote the part as a fictional character and hoped to cast a comedic actor instead. They were pleasantly surprised when David Koechner said yes to playing the role. Jason Alexander joined the film in July 2019.

== Release ==
The film premiered at Santa Barbara International Film Festival in January 2020.

The film was released October 9, 2020, across most major video-on-demand platforms.

== Reception ==
On the review aggregator website Rotten Tomatoes, 97% of 33 critics' reviews are positive. The website's consensus reads: "Faith Ba$ed affectionately skewers faith-based filmmaking while offering a surprisingly nuanced look at friendship and belief." Metacritic, which uses a weighted average, assigned the film a score of 42 out of 100, based on five critics, indicating "mixed or average" reviews.

Justin Lowe of The Hollywood Reporter wrote: "Masciale and screenwriter Luke Barnett, both Funny or Die regulars, have crafted a playfully humorous sendup that's more about poking fun at their characters than tearing down faith-based filmmaking." Norman Gidney at Film Threat called it "a surprisingly lighthearted romp that is more Guffman than Spinal Tap. A good-natured comedy that, while not always funny, remains as sincere as The Book of Mormon. No, really, that is a massive compliment." Grant Hermanns of ComingSoon.net gave it eight out of ten and wrote: "Faith Based ultimately proves to be a really charming, very smart and frequently funny ride with a unique satirical target and a sweet cast." Michael Ordona of the Los Angeles Times gave it a mixed review: "Is Faith Based the answer to the prayers of comedy-starved movie buffs? Not entirely, but it's no plague of locusts, either."

Roger Moore at Movie Nation called it "basically a 90 minute swing-and-a-miss", and Ben Kenigsberg of The New York Times called it "abysmally unfunny."
