= BearCity =

- Directed by: Doug Langway
- Written by: Doug Langway; Lawrence Ferber
- Produced by: Heidi H. Hamelin
- Starring: Joe Conti; Stephen Guarino; Brian Keane; Gregory Gunter; Sebastian La Cause; Alex Di Dio; James Martinez; Gerald McCullouch
- Cinematography: Michael Hauer
- Edited by: Gerald Fernando; Doug Langway
- Music by: Kerry Muzzey
- Distributed by: TLA Releasing
- Release dates: June 11, 2010 (Newfest New York LGBT Film Festival); October 22, 2010 (United States)
- Country: United States
- Language: English

BearCity is a 2010 American gay-themed comedy-drama film directed by Doug Langway, and written by Langway and Lawrence Ferber. It stars Joe Conti as a young gay man in the "twink" category who fantasizes about larger, hairier men known as "bears", and his search to find the perfect man.

The sequel BearCity 2: The Proposal was released in the fall of 2012. BearCity 3 was funded by an Indiegogo crowdfunding campaign, and had a limited release at various LGBT festivals and venues in 2016, and received a full release digitally and on home media in 2017.

A novelization of the film, also written by Lawrence Ferber, was published by Lethe Press' Bear Bones imprint in 2013.

== Plot ==
Tyler, an aspiring actor in his early twenties, has just moved to New York City in an attempt to jump-start his career. Young and slender, he fits in the "twink" category, but finds himself attracted to "bears", hairy and larger-bodied men. Tyler realizes his expectations of sexual escapades are falling far short of what he would have liked, while simultaneously falling for Roger, the muscle-bear friend of his roommates Fred and Brent. Meanwhile, Roger fears judgment for being with someone from outside the community, and hesitates to introduce Tyler to his friends.

== Cast ==
- Joe Conti as Tyler
- Stephen Guarino as Brent
- Brian Keane as Fred
- Gregory Gunter as Michael
- Sebastian La Cause as Fernando
- Alex Di Dio as Simon
- James Martinez as Carlos
- Gerald McCullouch as Roger
- Ashlie Atkinson as Amy
