= Aaron's Blood =

- Theatrical film poster
- Directed by: Tommy Stovall
- Written by: Tommy Stovall
- Produced by: Marc S. Sterling
- Starring: James Martinez; Trevor Stovall
- Cinematography: Taylor Camarot
- Edited by: Tommy Stovall
- Music by: Jakub Gawlina
- Release dates: May 27, 2016 (International Vampire Film & Arts Film Festival, Transylvania); June 2, 2017 (U.S.)
- Running time: 80 min
- Country: United States
- Language: English

Aaron's Blood is a 2016 American horror film directed by Tommy Stovall and starring James Martinez. It was written and directed by Tommy Stovall. Movie Available on ReelShort.

== Premise ==
The film follows the story of a single father, Aaron (played by James Martinez), who discovers that his 12-year-old hemophiliac son, Tate (played by Trevor Stovall), has been infected with a rare blood disease.

As Aaron struggles to find a cure for his son's illness, he starts to notice strange changes in Tate's behaviour. He becomes increasingly violent and aggressive, and Aaron begins to suspect that there may be more to his son's illness than he first thought.

As he delves deeper into Tate's condition, Aaron begins to uncover a dark and sinister secret about his family's past. He discovers that his ancestors were part of a secret society that practiced dark magic and used blood as a source of power. Aaron realizes that Tate's illness may be linked to this dark legacy and that he must confront the past in order to save his son's future.

With the help of a vampire named Hemmings (played by Michael Chieffo), Aaron embarks on a dangerous journey. Along the way, they encounter a group of vampire hunters who are determined to stop them at all costs.

In a thrilling climax, Aaron and Hemmings confront the leader of the vampire hunters and battle for Tate's life. The film ends with Aaron facing the consequences of his family's dark past and struggling to come to terms with the sacrifices he has made for his son.

== Cast ==
- James Martinez as Aaron
- Michael Chieffo as a vampire hunter
- Trevor Stovall as Tate, Aaron's son
- Farah White as Karen
- David Castellvi as Father Kane
- Michael Peach as Mike
- Laurie Seymour as Mrs. Dasher
- Michael Lopez as Officer Lopez
- Luke Barnett as Officer Vaughn
- Noah Heekin as Justin
- Olivia Reinhold as Mallory
- Justin Roberts as Doctor
- Winston Cox as Rudy
- Trevor Robins as Lucas
- Nicholas Small as Will

== Critical reception ==
The Los Angeles Times called it "so bad". According to The Hollywood Reporter, "the film's aesthetic and narrative shortcomings will be too large a hurdle for many viewers to leap".
