= BearCity 2: The Proposal =

- Directed by: Doug Langway
- Written by: Doug Langway
- Produced by: Jim Lande; Tracey Utley; Henry White
- Starring: Gerald McCullouch; Joe Conti; Stephen Guarino; Brian Keane; Gregory Gunter; James Martinez; Alex Di Dio; Aaron Tone; T. Doyle Leverett; Susan Mosher; Jason Stuart; Kevin Smith; Richard Riehle; Kathy Najimy
- Cinematography: Michael Hauer
- Edited by: Doug Langway
- Music by: Mark Andersen; Peter Calandra
- Release dates: July 20, 2012 (Los Angeles Gay and Lesbian Film Festival); September 28, 2012 (United States); December 5, 2012 (DVD & Blu-ray)
- Country: United States
- Language: English

BearCity 2: The Proposal is a 2012 American gay-themed (in particular, the bear community) comedy-drama film written and directed by Doug Langway. It is a sequel to his 2010 film BearCity.

In addition to the major characters from the original BearCity, the cast includes Richard Riehle and Susie Mosher as Tyler's parents, and Kathy Najimy as Brent's mother.

BearCity 3 was funded by an Indiegogo crowdfunding campaign, and had a limited release at various LGBT festivals and venues in 2016. It received a full release digitally and on home media in 2017.

== Premise ==
Following the legalization of same-sex marriage in New York, Roger proposes to his boyfriend Tyler, and the gang embarks on a road trip to have the wedding in Provincetown, Massachusetts during "Bear Week".

== Cast ==
- Gerald McCullouch as Roger
- Joe Conti as Tyler
- Stephen Guarino as Brent
- Brian Keane as Fred
- Gregory Gunter as Michael
- James Martinez as Carlos
- Alex Di Dio as Simon
- Aaron Tone as Nate
- T. Doyle Leverett as Big Dan
- Susan Mosher as Rachel
- Jason Stuart as Scott
- Kevin Smith as himself
- Richard Riehle as Gabe
- Kathy Najimy as Rose
- Frank DeCaro as himself

== Release ==
The film was screened at the Los Angeles Gay and Lesbian Film Festival and Philadelphia QFest in July 2012, before going into general release on September 28. It was subsequently released on DVD and Blu-ray on December 5, 2012, by SharpLeft Studios, and was made available as a digital download on January 11, 2013.
