= John Wesley De Kay =

American dramatist

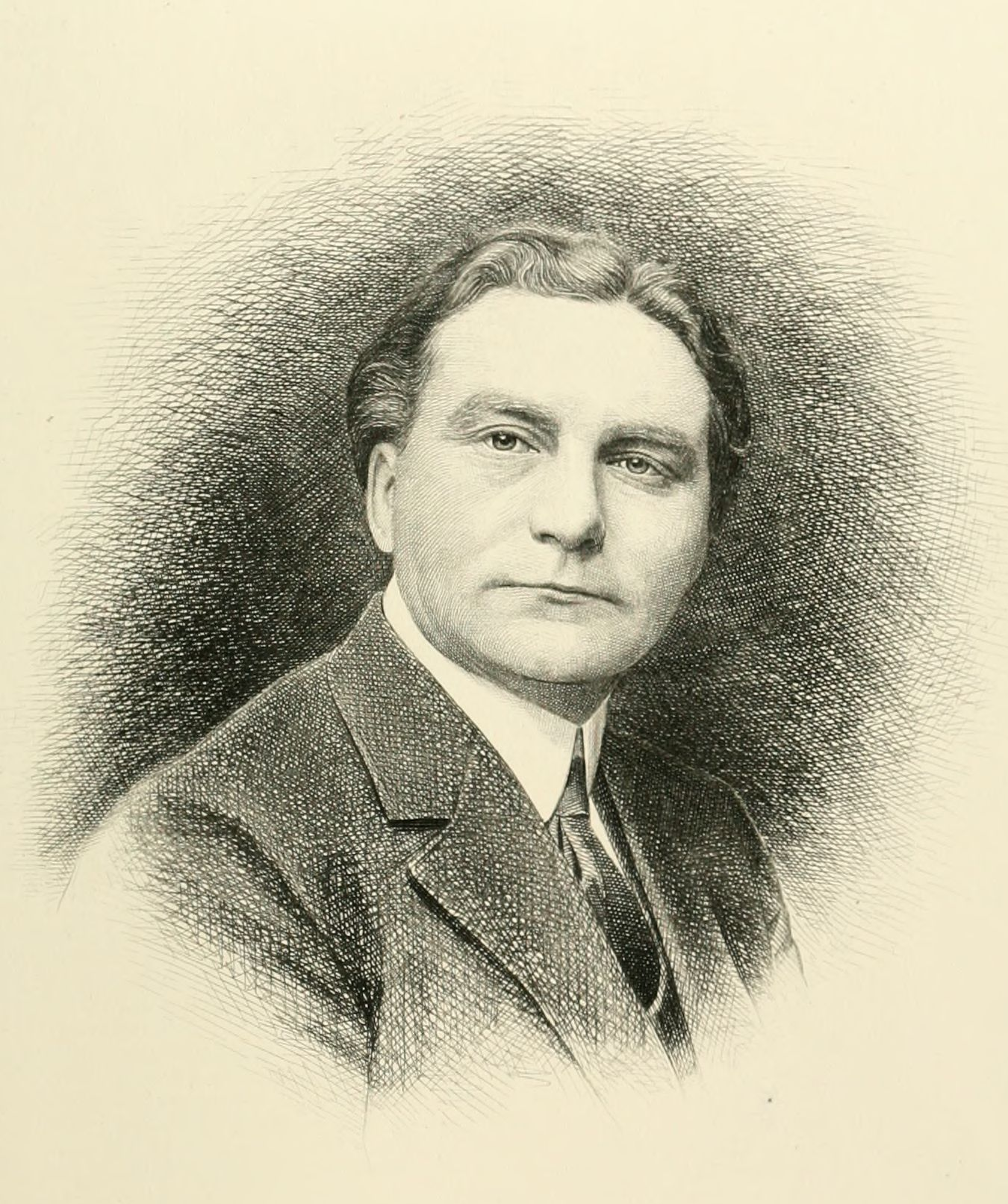
John Wesley De Kay

John Wesley De Kay (July 20, 1872 – 1938) was an American entrepreneur and self-made millionaire, playwright, author, and eccentric socialite. He became known as the "Sausage King" of Mexico with the brand "Popo".

== Family background and upbringing ==
Born on July 20, 1872, in New Hampton, Iowa, De Kay's family had moved to the frontier in the late 1860s from New York. The De Kay's had immigrated to New Amsterdam from Tuil, Gelderland, the Netherlands in the mid-1650s. The De Kay's can be traced back to French nobility at Chateau de Coucy in the 13th century. After completing an apprenticeship as a printer, the entrepreneurial teenager moved to South Dakota, where he owned several local newspapers and a sizable cattle ranch. In 1899, De Kay moved to Mexico. With the money he had made in his businesses, he purchased a concession for operating meatpacking plants in Mexico. He married Anna May Walton in 1897 and had three children. In 1909, De Kay's company, the Mexican national packing company Popo, was one of the largest slaughtering and meat-distribution operations in Mexico, with a book value of over US$22 million ($500 million in today's value). By 1910 he was the "Sausage King" of Mexico.

== The Theater Production Judas ==
A self-made millionaire, indeed the American Dream come true for the son of a Dutch immigrant, De Kay decided in 1909 to become a playwright in New York. His first controversial play, Judas, was performed in New York's Globe Theatre for only one night in December 1910 before it was banned there, as well as in Boston and Philadelphia. In New York's art scene of 1910, the story line of the play was nothing short of scandalous. (Mary Magdalene, who at first becomes a lover of Pontius Pilate, then of Judas Iscariot, gets involved with Jesus. Judas, after realizing that Mary Magdalene has given herself to Jesus, decides to betray his friend to the Romans.) To top the provocation of New York's theater lovers, De Kay had Judas played by the voluptuous French actress, Madame Sarah Bernhardt. The eccentric businessman-turned-playwright obviously had a special attraction to the lovely diva. He showered her with lavish gifts of jewelry, "…a large number of cigarette boxes made from gold nuggets, brooches, nugget buttons and studs, cigar boxes inlaid with ivory, and a large number of other rare articles". The play, however, bombed. De Kay craved public attention and flaunted his wealth, which in 1910 included a castle in France, a mansion in England, and a suite in New York's plush Hotel Ansonia.

== Support of Mexican President Huerta ==
In January 1914, De Kay negotiated the sale of the majority interest in his meat packing empire to the Mexican government for an estimated US$5 million ($105 million today). According to historian Thomas Baecker, the German Foreign Office thought that De Kay was "an ill-reputed American businessman". From all appearances, he was a tough businessman with great success who basked in the sun of his achievements. He had his fair share of lawsuits from investors, but it seems that these had more to do with the havoc the Mexican Revolution wreaked on his company than with unethical behavior on his part. However, he wore long hair and "dresse[d] like a Latin Quarter Bohemian". His extravagance, eccentricity, showmanship, and nouveau-riche behavior certainly did not fit the German ideal of a serious and trustworthy businessman.

De Kay's main value to President Victoriano Huerta was that he had international credit while the Mexican government at the time had none. Sometime in the beginning of 1914, the businessman arranged a badly needed loan with the French government for 35 million francs. The loan appears to have been a quid pro quo for the Mexican government bailing out De Kay's defunct meat business. While archival sources on this transaction are missing, the timing and the sizable price tag of the purchase speak to the quid-pro-quo theory. According to De Kay himself, he used the French loan and placed arms and ammunition orders with Belgian and French companies. German ambassador to Mexico Paul von Hintze confirmed the De Kay loan and arms shipments, which were arranged through the Hamburg banking house of Martin Schroeder. De Kay's money financed most of the weapons which the German steamer Ypiranga carried to Veracruz in April 1914. The arrival of the HAPAG ship precipitated the United States occupation of Veracruz.

== Author ==
Aside from his social activities, interest in multiple businesses, and attempts as a playwright, John De Kay also authored over twenty books on a variety of topics, finance, women's rights, the labor movement, politics, Mexican history, and World War I. Fairly well known are:

- Colonization in Mexico: An Interview with General Porfirio Díaz, President of the United States of Mexico, Accorded to Mr. John W. De Kay, Together with Leading Press Comments and an Introduction by Robert J. Barrett (1909)
- Judas (1910)
- Brown Leaves (1911)
- The People's Money: A Brief Analysis of the Present Position in America (1913)
- Dictators of Mexico: The Land Where Hope Marches with Despair (1914)
- The World Allies: A Survey of Nationalism, Labour and World-trade (1917)
- Women and the New Social State (1918)
- The League of Nations: A World Illusion (1918)
- The Spirit of the International at Berne (1919)
- A Peaceful Solution to the World Crisis (1919)
- Mexico, the Problem and the Solution (1927)
- Love and Other Songs (1929)
