= Daddy (2015 film) =

- Directed by: Gerald McCullouch
- Written by: Dan Via
- Starring: Gerald McCullouch; Dan Via; Jaime Cepero; Mackenzie Astin; Leslie Easterbrook
- Release date: August 30, 2015 (MWFF)
- Running time: 89 minutes
- Country: United States
- Language: English

Daddy is an American comedy-drama film, released in 2015. The directorial debut of Gerald McCullouch, the film is based on the play by Dan Via.

The film stars McCullouch and Via as Colin McCormack and Stewart Wisniewski, two gay men in their late 40s. Longtime friends whose relationship has taken on many of the emotional undercurrents and routines of a non-sexual marriage, their bond is tested when Colin begins dating a younger man (Jaime Cepero).

The film's cast also includes Brooke Anne Smith, Jay Jackson, Tamlyn Tomita, Scott Henry, John Rubinstein, Mackenzie Astin, Richard Riehle and Leslie Easterbrook.

== Plot ==
Colin McCormack (Gerald McCullouch) is a 40-something openly gay male politically liberal columnist for a prominent newspaper. Stewart Wisniewski (Dan Via) is a 40-something mostly closeted gay male who works for a prominent law firm. The two have known one another most of their lives, and have formed a marriage in all but name. They live next door to one another, eat meals together, spend their free time together, and are deeply emotionally intimate but not sexually involved with one another. Colin pursues handsome young men in their 20s for sex.

Thaddeus "Tee" Bloom (Jaime Cepero) is a 21-year-old gay African American college student who has won an internship at Colin's newspaper. He apparently idolizes Colin. The two feel a mutual attraction, and after a night of heavy drinking begin sleeping with one another. Their relationship becomes intensely emotional, and Colin begins to feel he might partner with Tee. Tee has discovered that Colin is his father as a result of a sperm donation he made when he was a college student. Tee's intense desire to know his father led him to commit incest with Colin.

The revelation of Tee's parentage forces Colin to reconcile the competing values and dreams in his life.

== Background ==
McCullouch and Via starred in the original stage production of Daddy, which was staged in New York City and Los Angeles in 2010. The film adaptation was funded in part by a Kickstarter campaign in 2013.

According to Via, the play and film were inspired by the "daddy" phenomenon in the gay dating scene, as well as a desire to explore the effects of the contemporary normalization of same-sex marriage on older gay men who had been raised to believe that marriage and family were not available to them, and who thus built their own alternative models of family and social connection.

== See also ==
- List of lesbian, gay, bisexual or transgender-related films of 2015
