= Bear Nation =

- Directed by: Malcolm Ingram
- Written by: Malcolm Ingram
- Produced by: Malcolm Ingram
- Starring: Douglas Langway
- Edited by: Frank Guidoccio
- Production company: View Askew Productions
- Release date: June 20, 2010 (FRAMELINE)
- Country: United States
- Language: English

Bear Nation is a 2010 documentary film directed by Malcolm Ingram that focuses on the Bear movement within the gay community. The executive producer is Kevin Smith.

== Plot ==
"Malcolm Ingram introduces us to gay men who dig big dudes who are stockier and hairier than the airbrushed ideal served by up lifestyle magazines and underwear ads. From 'bear runs' - the circuit parties of the ursine - to men proudly accepting their own bodies (and the beer bellies the want to cuddle), Bear Nation proves love really does come in all shapes and sizes."
