= Coffin (film) =

2011 thriller film

- Film poster
- Directed by: Kipp Tribble; Derik Wingo
- Written by: Kipp Tribble
- Produced by: Kipp Tribble; Derik Wingo
- Starring: Kevin Sorbo; Sunny Doench; Bruce Davison; Patrick Barnitt; Luke Barnett; Kipp Tribble; Derik Wingo
- Release date: October 22, 2011 (REEL)
- Country: United States
- Language: English

Coffin is a 2011 thriller film starring Kevin Sorbo and Bruce Davison. It was executive produced by Spencer F. Johnson for Skyrocket Productions. The film was written by Kipp Tribble, and directed by Tribble and Derik Wingo. A sequel, Coffin 2, premiered in Los Angeles on August 10, 2017.

== Plot ==
Jack Samms' evening started normal enough. But then the mysterious masked stranger, known as Trick, pays him a visit. Within minutes, Jack is faced with a ticking clock after Trick reveals that Jack's estranged wife and her lover are buried in a wooden box - and will be out of oxygen in 75 minutes. With two cops hot on his trail, Jack must try to avoid being framed for his wife's murder while under Trick's constant watch. When a pay-off to Trick goes wrong, Jack must engage in a dangerous game of cat and mouse with the masked stranger in order to save his wife... and himself.

== Cast ==
- Kevin Sorbo as Sean Justice
- Bruce Davison as Garrison
- Sunny Doench as Rona
- Johnny Alonso as Trick
- Kipp Tribble as Scott
- Derik Wingo as Epperson
- Moksha McPherrin as Frankie
- Luke Barnett as Pete
- Andrena Senola as Penelope Grant

== Production ==
In addition to executive producer Spencer F. Johnson, the film was produced by David Stever, Kipp Tribble, Derik Wingo, and George Maranville.

Production began on May 31, 2010, and filmed for nine days in and around Los Angeles, California.

== Release ==
Coffin premiered October 27, 2011, and had a limited theatrical run in Los Angeles. On August 14, 2012, the film received a wide release across the U.S. in Redbox kiosks. Coffin landed on the Redbox top 20 most rented list for the week that it was released.
