= James Martinez (actor) =

American actor

- Occupation: Actor
- Years active: 2003–present
- Notable credits: House of Cards; Love, Victor; Dexter: Original Sin

James Martinez is an American actor, known for his role as Alex Romero in season five of House of Cards, Armando Salazar in Love, Victor, and Angel Batista in the Dexter prequel series Dexter: Original Sin.

== Career ==
Martinez portrayed series regular Jorge Sanchez in Gravity on Starz in 2010. In 2017, he appeared as Alex Romero in season five of the Netflix series House of Cards. Martinez portrayed Victor on the Netflix series One Day at a Time from 2017 to 2019. From 2020 to 2022, he starred as Armando Salazar on the Hulu series Love, Victor. In 2024, Martinez was cast as young Angel Batista in Dexter: Original Sin.

== Selected filmography ==
=== Television ===
Year	Project	Role	Notes	Ref.
2003	Law & Order	Manuel Lopez	Episode: "Star Crossed"	
2003	Third Watch	Stevie Nuniz	Episode: "Closing In"	
2008	NCIS	Lieutenant Eduardo Almeida	Episode: "Agent Afloat"	
2008	Numbers	Damien Rove	Episode: "The Decoy Effect"	
2009	Law & Order	D.J. Jonny Cortez	Episode: "Boy Gone Astray"	
2010	Law & Order: Criminal Intent	Rick Caldera	Episode: "True Legacy"	
2010	Law & Order: Special Victims Unit	Clark Tinta	Episode: "Rescue"	
2010	Rubicon	Officer Martinez	Episode: "The Truth Will Out"	
2010	Gravity	Jorge Sanchez	Series regular	
2011	Breaking Bad	Maximino Arciniega	Episode: "Hermanos"	
2011	Leverage	Javier	Episode: "The Grave Danger Job"	
2011	A Gifted Man	George	Episode: "In Case of Memory Loss"	
2012	Fairly Legal	Emilio Cedeno	Episode: "Borderline"	
2013	Low Winter Sun	Detective John Hernandez	5 episodes	
2013	CSI: Crime Scene Investigation	John Fletcher	Episode: "Helpless"	
2013	Blue Bloods	Officer Salazar	Episode: "Unwritten Rules"	
2013	The Michael J. Fox Show	Mr. Diaz	Episode: "Pilot"	
2013	Drop Dead Diva	Luis Vega	Episode: "50 Shades of Grayson"	
2013	Army Wives	Dr. Marco Sanchez	Episode: "Damaged"	
2013	Hustling	Carlos	Episode: "Sugar"	
2014	Unforgettable	Robert Chavez	Episode: "Admissions"	
2014	Elementary	Diego Salcedo	Episode: "Dead Clade Walking"	
2014	Intelligence	Gonzalo 'Gonzo' Rodriguez	Episode: "Pilot"	
2015	Aquarius	Ruben Salazar	3 episodes	
2016	Queen of the South	Gato Fierros	2 episodes	
2016	The Mysteries of Laura	Carlos Hernandez	Episode: "The Mystery of the Political Operation"	
2017	The Blacklist: Redemption	Carlos Cantara	Episode: "Hostages"	
2017	Bull	Agent Conrad	Episode: "Benevolent Deception"	
2017	The Good Fight	Frank Gwinn	Episode: "First Week"	
2017	House of Cards	Alex Romero	9 episodes	
2017	Major Crimes	Ian Nuñez	3 episodes	
2017–2019	One Day at a Time	Victor	9 episodes	
2018–2019	Tell Me a Story	Detective Olsen	4 episodes	
2019	Billions	Ray Cruz	Episode: "Chickentown"	
2019	God Friended Me	William	Episode: "Miracle on 123rd Street"	
2020–2022	Love, Victor	Armando Salazar	Series regular, 28 episodes	
2023	Wolf Pack	Roberto Navarro	Recurring role, 5 episodes	
2024	So Help Me Todd	Leo Hart	Episode: "Faux-Bituary"	
2024–2025	Dexter: Original Sin	Detective Angel Batista	Series regular	

=== Film ===
Year	Project	Role	Ref.
2004	Brother to Brother	Julio	
2007	I Believe in America	Tomás	
2009	B-Girl	Héctor	
2010	BearCity	Carlos	
2012	BearCity 2: The Proposal	Carlos	
2012	The Sessions	Matt	
2015	Run All Night	Detective Oscar Torres	
2016	Aaron's Blood	Aaron	

=== Video games ===
Year	Title	Role
2006	25 to Life	Shawn Calderon
2010	Red Dead Redemption	Mexican Law Man
2018	Red Dead Redemption 2	Ramón Cortez
2025	NBA 2K26	Guillermo 'Memo' Solano
