= The Ansonia =

Residential building in Manhattan, New York

- Ansonia Hotel
- U.S. National Register of Historic Places
- New York State Register of Historic Places
- New York City Landmark
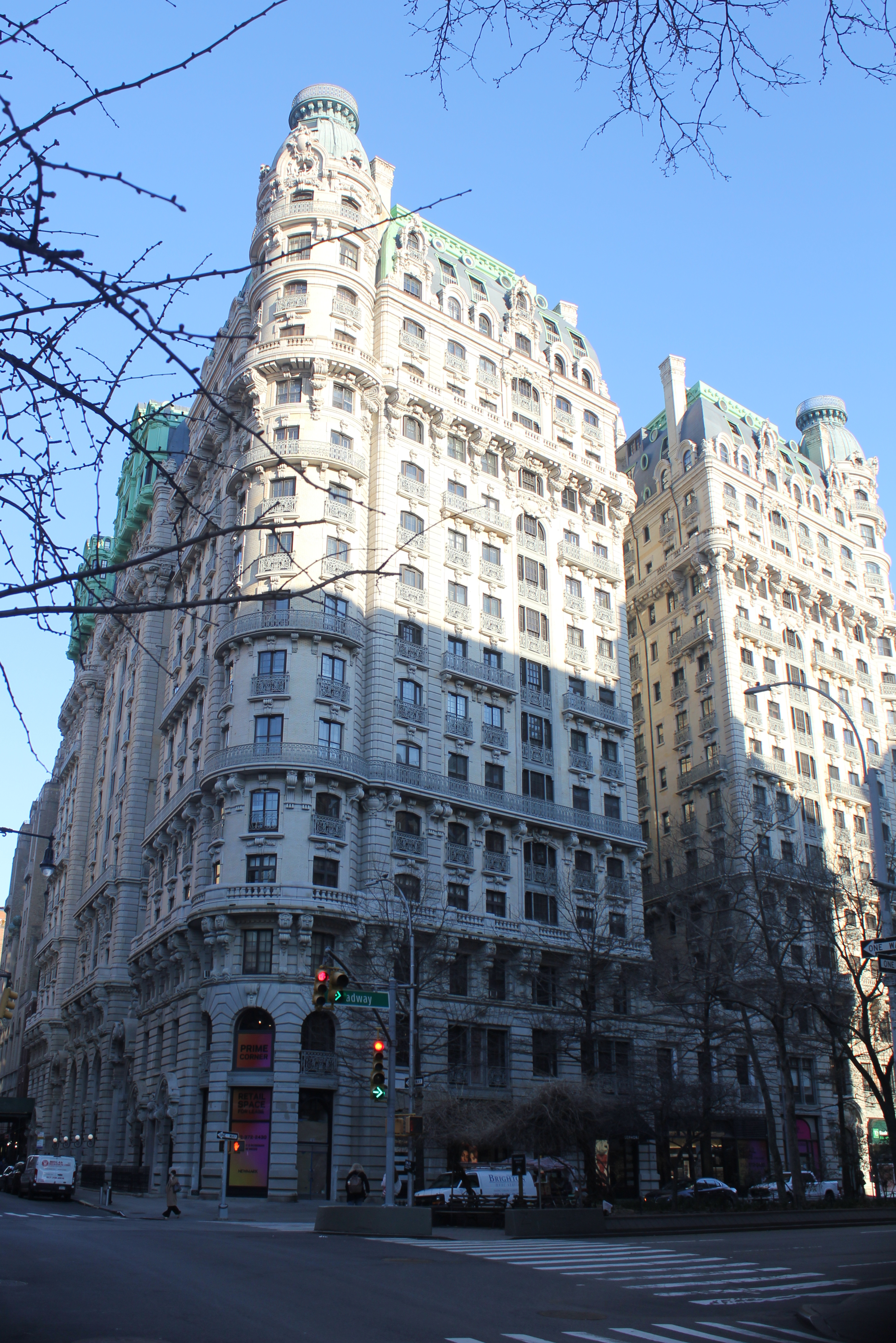
- Seen from the corner of Broadway and 73rd Street (2023)
- Location: 2109 Broadway, Manhattan, New York
- Coordinates: 40°46′48″N 73°58′56″W
- Area: 44,375 ft^{2} (4,122.6 m^{2})
- Built: 1899–1904
- Architect: Paul Emile Duboy
- Architectural style: Beaux Arts
- NRHP reference No.: 80002665
- NYSRHP No.: 06101.000611
- NYCL No.: 0285

Significant dates
- Added to NRHP: January 10, 1980
- Designated NYSRHP: June 23, 1980
- Designated NYCL: March 14, 1972

The Ansonia (formerly the Ansonia Hotel) is a condominium building at 2109 Broadway, between 73rd and 74th Streets, on the Upper West Side of Manhattan in New York City, New York, United States. The 17-story structure was designed by French architect Paul Emile Duboy in the Beaux-Arts style. It was built between 1899 and 1903 as a residential hotel by William Earle Dodge Stokes, who named it after his grandfather, the industrialist Anson Greene Phelps. Over the years, the Ansonia has housed many conductors, opera singers, baseball players, and other famous and wealthy people. The Ansonia is a New York City designated landmark and is listed on the National Register of Historic Places.

The building occupies a large, irregular site on the west side of Broadway. It has a facade of limestone, granite, white brick, and terracotta, as well as turrets at its corners, light courts along each side, and a three-story mansard roof. The Ansonia Hotel was constructed with as many as 2,500 rooms, many of which were arranged as multi-room suites, although these have since been downsized to 425 apartments. Originally, the hotel had its own power plant and air-filtration plant, as well as a system of pneumatic tubes and cooling pipes. The public rooms, including the lobby, basement shopping arcade, and restaurants, were decorated in the Louis XIV style, and the hotel also had a small roof farm in the 1900s. There was also a basement with a swimming pool, which in the late 20th century housed a gay bathhouse called the Continental Baths and later, a swingers' club called Plato's Retreat. The apartments themselves ranged from small studios to multi-room suites with parlors, libraries, and dining rooms. Over the years, both the apartments and public spaces have been substantially rearranged, but the facade has remained largely intact.

Stokes headed the Onward Construction Company, which acquired the site in July 1899 and built the hotel there. The restaurants in the hotel were dedicated in February 1903, though the hotel itself did not formally open until April 16, 1904. Frank Harriman leased the Ansonia in 1911, turning it into a short-term hotel, and the Bowman-Biltmore Hotels chain took over in 1918 and renovated the hotel. Stokes's son W. E. D. "Weddie" Stokes acquired the hotel after his father's death in 1926. The Ansonia passed through multiple operators during the 1920s and stopped offering hotel services in the early 1930s. The building was sold three times between 1945 and 1948 before being auctioned in 1950 to Jacob Starr. The Ansonia gradually fell into disrepair through the 1970s, and Ansonia Associates eventually acquired it in 1978. Ansonia Associates repaired many of the building's issues but was involved in hundreds of lawsuits during that time. The Ansonia was converted into a condominium building in 1992, although rent-regulated tenants remained in the building into the 21st century.

== Site ==
The Ansonia is at 2109 Broadway, on the Upper West Side of Manhattan in New York City. It occupies the eastern end of a trapezoidal city block bounded by Broadway to the east, 74th Street to the north, West End Avenue to the west, and 73rd Street to the south. The land lot covers 44,375 ft^{2} (4,122.6 m^{2}). The site has frontage of about 185 ft (56 m) on 74th Street, 218 ft (66 m) on Broadway, and 249 ft (76 m) on 73rd Street. It occupies what was originally 42 land lots. The Ansonia is on a curved section of Broadway, which runs diagonally to the Manhattan street grid to the south, but which parallels other avenues to the north. Prior to the development of larger structures on Broadway, the building was originally visible from as far south as 59th Street and as far north as 105th Street.

Several other notable structures are near the building, including the Level Club to the west, the Rutgers Presbyterian Church to the south, the Hotel Beacon and Beacon Theatre to the northeast, the Apple Bank Building to the east, and the Dorilton one block south. Directly south of the Ansonia is Verdi Square and an entrance for the New York City Subway's 72nd Street station, serving the 1, 2, and 3 trains.

The city's first subway line was developed starting in the late 1890s, and it opened in 1904 with a station at Broadway and 72nd Street. The construction of the subway spurred the development of high-rise apartment buildings on the Upper West Side along Broadway; many of these buildings were constructed on land that had never been developed. The Ansonia was one of several large apartment buildings developed on the Upper West Side in the early 1900s, along with such structures as the Dorilton and the Astor.

== Architecture ==
The Ansonia was built as a residential hotel and is designed in the Beaux-Arts style, with ornamentation such as brackets, moldings, scrolls, and medallions. Its developer, William Earl Dodge Stokes, listed himself as "architect-in-chief" for the project and hired French architect Paul Emile Duboy to draw up the plans. Duboy made only one set of drawings before Stokes demoted him to a draftsman, and it is not known how much of the Ansonia's final design is derived from Duboy's original plans, as Stokes modified them later. The New Orleans architect Martin Shepard served as draftsman and assistant superintendent of construction, while George Vassar's Son & Co. built the structure. The building was named for industrialist Anson Green Phelps, the developer's grandfather.

The Ansonia is 17 stories tall. Early plans called for the building to be 12 stories, 14 stories, or more than 20 stories. In a letter to the New York City Landmarks Preservation Commission (LPC), the developer's son William Earl Dodge Stokes Jr. claimed that "they just put one floor on top of another and they got up to the seventeenth floor, and they decided they wouldn't build any more". Other sources have cited the Ansonia as being 16 or 18 stories tall.

=== Form and facade ===
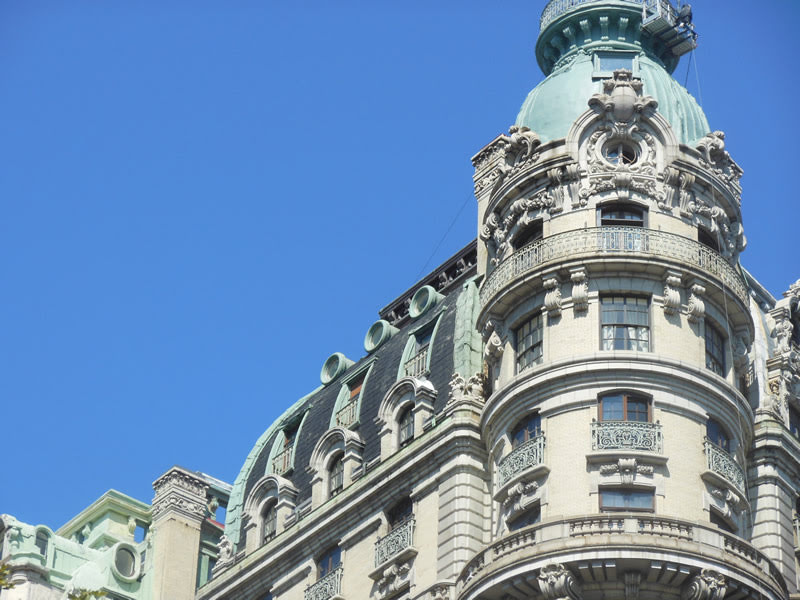
One of the cupolas

The Ansonia measures about 200 by 200 ft (61 by 61 m). The building includes turrets with cupolas at its corners and light courts along each side. Early drawings also called for a large tower at the building's center, but this was dropped in the final design. There are two light courts each on 73rd and 74th Streets and one light court along Broadway. This gives the building an irregular "H" shape, which allowed each guestroom, suite, and apartment to receive as much natural light as possible.

The Ansonia has a facade of limestone, granite, white brick, and terracotta. The base is clad with rusticated blocks of limestone, and there are balconies just above the base and near the top of the building. On 73rd Street is a 27 ft (8.2 m) archway (which originally led to a tea room) and two full-height windows, which were restored in the 2000s as part of the construction of a North Face store at the building's base. All three windows, which had been hidden behind a masonry wall for several decades, have cast-iron frames and large roundel windows.

On the intermediate stories are French windows with elaborate iron balconies. The balconies, many of which span several bays, visually divide the facade into several groups of windows. Some parts of the facade are characterized by smooth brickwork, limestone, and terracotta details, while other sections are ornamented with quoins and rusticated limestone blocks. The facade was decorated with Louis XVI style grilles and scrollwork, leading the Ansonia to be nicknamed "the Wedding Cake of the Upper West Side". The building is topped by a convex mansard roof, which measures three stories high. Prior to World War II, the building had a copper cornice and seven copper cartouches, each weighing 4 to 5 short tons (3.6 to 4.5 long tons; 3.6 to 4.5 t). Each domed cupola is topped by finials and widow's walk rooftop platforms.

=== Features ===
When the Ansonia opened in the 1900s, it covered 550,000 ft^{2} (51,000 m^{2}). Sources disagree on the size of the hotel, which has been variously cited as having 1,400 guestrooms and 340 suites, or 1,218 guestrooms and 400 suites. One source described the hotel as having 2,500 total rooms (including rooms within individual apartments). There were about 400 full bathrooms and about 600 additional sinks and toilets; at the time of the Ansonia's construction, it was the largest-ever plumbing contract. Of the 340 original apartments 222 were classified as housekeeping suites, whose residents could hire one or two servants who lived in the apartment. The modern-day Ansonia has 425 apartments, as well as a garage and a rooftop terrace.

The hotel was also planned with "more and finer banquet halls, assembly rooms, and reception rooms than any other hotel". All of the public rooms were decorated in the Louis XIV style. An art curator, Joseph Gilmartin, was hired to display the hotel's collection of 600 paintings.

==== Mechanical features ====
The hotel contained about 175 mi (282 km) of pipe, about ten times as much as in similarly sized office buildings. The pipes carried gas; hot, cold, and iced water; electrical wiring; and sewage. The boilers had a total capacity of 1,400 hp (1,000 kW). The building had its own power plant with coal-fired generators. The power plant occupied one-fourth of the basement. The Ansonia also included an air-filtration plant, which drew air from the western side of the building; the air was filtered, heated in the sub-basement, and distributed to each room through pipes in the walls. Air was ventilated from a flue on the roof.

There were originally six elevators for guests, two elevators for housekeepers, two freight elevators, and numerous dumbwaiters. Although the Otis Elevator Company had offered to install elevators in the building, Stokes considered them too expensive, so he created his own elevator company and his own hydraulic-elevator model, which could travel at up to 400 ft/min (120 m/min). Upon the Ansonia's opening in 1903, it was cited as having 362 telephones, 18,000 electric burners, 2,500 steam radiators, 400 refrigerators, and 1,000 faucets. The building also had 600 toilets and 400 washrooms, more than any other residential building in New York City at the time.

==== Public areas ====
In the basement was a shopping arcade with a butcher, a barber, and a laundry room. There was also a theater, bakery, a milk shop, hairdressers' salons, cold-storage vaults, safe-deposit vaults, and a vehicular garage, in addition to a liquor store and milliners' shop. The basement reportedly had the world's largest indoor swimming pool at the time of the Ansonia's completion, The swimming pool was cited as measuring either 90 by 40 ft (27 by 12 m) or 100 by 32 ft (30.5 by 9.8 m). The Continental Baths, a gay bathhouse operated by Steve Ostrow, began operating within the Ansonia's basement in 1967 or 1968. The bathhouse had "private encounter rooms", a sauna, a massage parlor, and Turkish baths. From 1977 to 1980, the Ansonia's basement housed Plato's Retreat, a club for heterosexual couples characterized in The New York Times as a swingers' sex club. The space was accessed by a mirrored staircase, and also featured a 60-person Jacuzzi, an "orgy room", a dance floor, and private rooms. In the 1990s, the basement was converted into storefront space.

The ground floor was devoted to public rooms and consisted of various offices and corridors. Originally, there were several storefronts at ground level, including a bank, a florist, and a pharmacy. The hotel's lobby included a fountain with live seals and was flanked by two banks of elevators. Next to the main entrance, on 73rd Street, was a palm court and assembly room. The ground-floor restaurant, decorated with chandeliers and hand-painted murals, could fit 550 people and included a balcony from which an orchestra performed at night. Also on the ground floor was a small grill room. There was a ballroom on the second floor, which was briefly converted into a mini-golf course in 1929. In the 21st century, American Musical and Dramatic Academy occupied the lower stories, with a theater, studios, private rooms, and performance spaces.

The top stories included a restaurant and a roof garden. The restaurant, on the 16th floor, was designed in an English style and could fit 1,300 people. During the summer, orchestras played music in the roof garden. The hotel's roof included a small farm, where Stokes kept farm animals next to his personal apartment, as well as a cattle elevator next to the farm. Stokes's decision to create a roof farm was influenced by his belief that the Ansonia could be either partially or fully self-sufficient. The farm housed bears, chickens, ducks, goats, and hogs; it also reportedly housed four geese and a pig owned by W. E. D. Stokes. Every day, a bellhop delivered free or half-priced fresh eggs to all tenants. The New York City Department of Health raided the roof farm in November 1907 after receiving a tip about it. In a failed effort to prevent its closure as an illegal farm, W. E. D. Stokes claimed the animals belonged to his son, W. E. D. "Weddie" Stokes Jr. Thereafter, the farm was closed, and the animals were sent to Central Park. When Weddie was 12 years old, he installed a radio transmitter on the roof of the hotel. For a short time in 1929, the roof contained handball courts.

==== Hallways and staircases ====
The hotel had two interior staircases and several fire escapes when it was completed. Leading from the lobby was a large stairwell, characterized as a spiral staircase. The marble-and-iron stairway was intended to complement the lobby's marble floor, which was designed in a black-and-white checkerboard pattern. The stairway was topped by a skylight, which was blacked out during World War II. The building reportedly had about 4.5 mi (7,200 m) of hallways in total. Hallways measured 10 ft (3.0 m) wide. Each story also had a hall attendant, a cold-storage pantry, a serving room where food from the kitchen could be delivered, and a reception room with communal toilets. On the 17th floor were rooms for staff.

==== Apartments ====
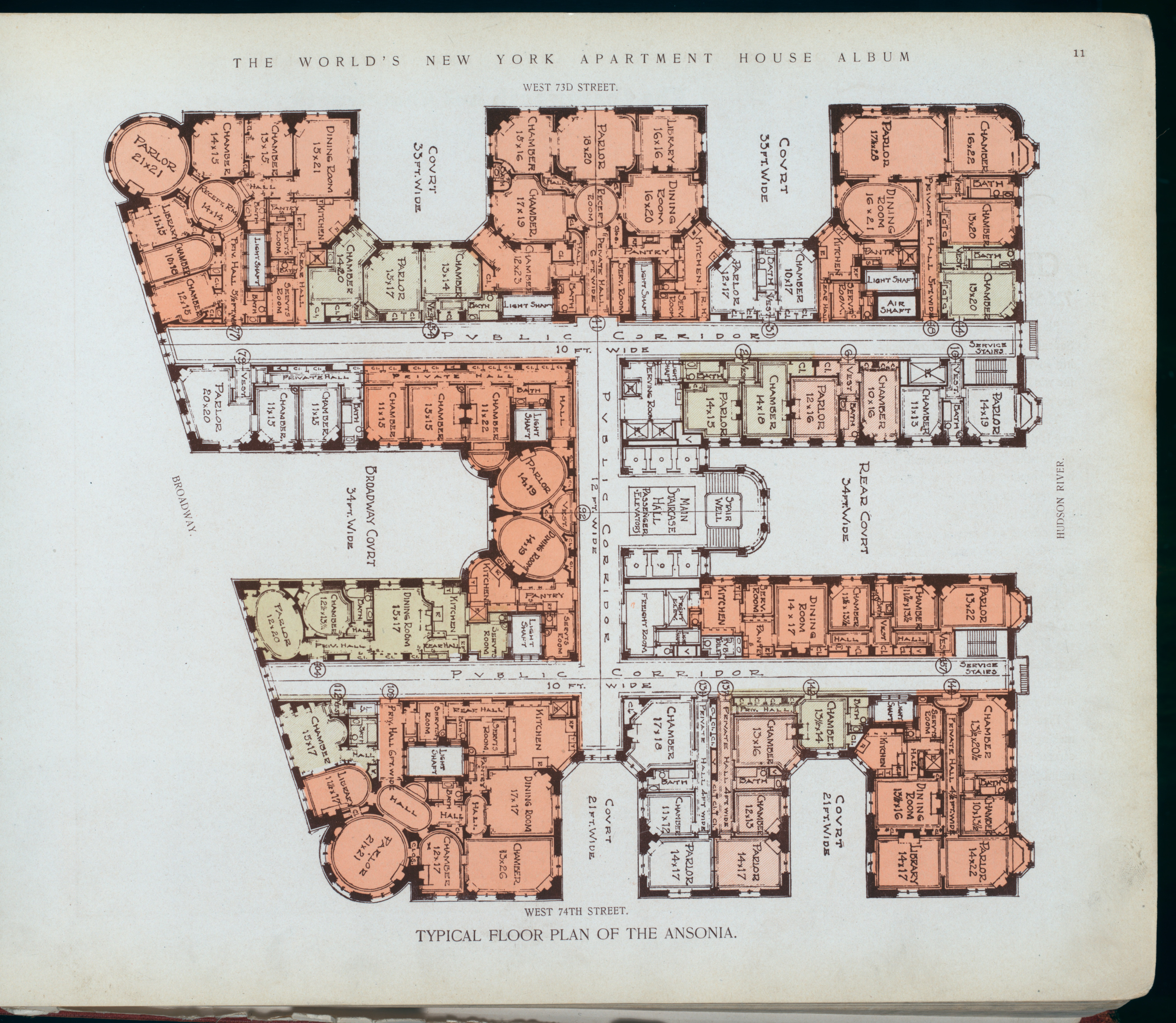
Original floor plan of a typical floor

Residents lived in "luxurious" apartments with multiple bedrooms, parlors, libraries, and formal dining rooms. The smallest units had one room and one bath, while the largest units had 18 rooms with several baths and toilets. Generally, the apartments were designed in the French Renaissance style with enameled woodwork. The suites had mahogany doors that were twice the width of normal doors, and the apartments were decorated with paintings from the hotel's collection. Other decorations included Persian rugs, domes with crystal chandeliers, and art glass windows. Long-term tenants were allowed to add their own furniture. The rooms had several doorways so they could easily be combined into a larger apartment. To facilitate this, the floors and moldings all had a uniform design so they would not look out of place when several rooms were merged. Some of the rooms were designed in unconventional shapes such as ovals, circles, and heraldic shields.

Each apartment's ceiling measured 12 ft (3.7 m) or 14 ft (4.3 m) tall. The building had extremely thick masonry walls measuring between 1 and 3 ft (0.30 and 0.91 m) thick, which made each apartment nearly soundproof. The thickness of the walls might be derived from Stokes's mistrust of insurance companies and his desire to make the structure fireproof. There were also reportedly 175 miles (282 km) of pipes and tubes laid throughout the building. Embedded in the walls was a system of pneumatic tubes, which allowed residents and staff to communicate easily. Each apartment had a landline for long-distance calling and call bells to summon staff; there was also a hall attendant on every floor. The walls also included a system of pipes that carried freezing brine, which was characterized as an early version of an air-conditioning system. The brine pipes allowed the building to maintain a constant temperature of 70 °F (21 °C) year-round. Many of the smaller guestrooms initially did not have kitchens because they were intended for short-term guests; instead, there were refrigerators in these units. Apartments with kitchens were equipped with electric ranges.

After the Ansonia was converted to condominiums, many of the old apartments were combined. Some apartments on the south side of the building retained their original layouts in the 2010s.

== History ==
During the early 19th century, apartment developments in the city were generally associated with the working class. By the late 19th century, apartments were also becoming desirable among the middle and upper classes. Between 1880 and 1885, more than ninety apartment buildings were developed in the city. Meanwhile, the Ansonia's developer William E. D. Stokes, an heir to the wealthy Stokes family, developed and bought real estate on the Upper West Side in the late 19th century. From 1887 to 1890, Stokes bought land at the intersection of 73rd Street and Broadway, but he did not redevelop the land immediately. According to the writer Elizabeth Hawes, the Ansonia was one of Stokes's "dream houses", along with a townhouse at 4 East 54th Street that he built but never occupied.

=== Stokes ownership ===
==== Development ====
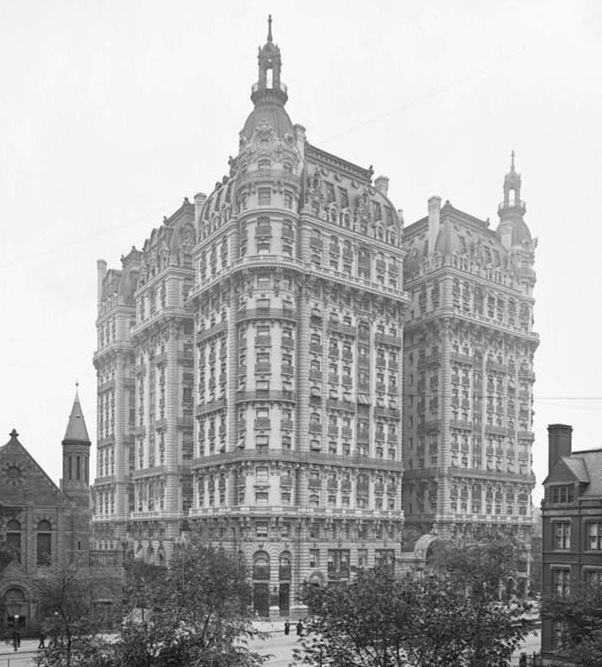
Seen in 1905

Stokes established the Onward Construction Company specifically to develop the hotel; the company was named after one of the Stokes family's racehorses. In July 1899, the Onward Construction Company acquired additional land on the western side of Broadway between 73rd and 74th Streets, and the Equitable Life Assurance Society placed a $500,000 mortgage loan on the site. Stokes also founded companies to manufacture the building's terracotta and elevators. (Note: According to Alpern 1992, p. 35, the elevators were made by the Standard Plunger Elevator Company, while the terracotta was manufactured by the New York Architectural Terra-Cotta Company.) He was closely involved in the hotel's development, having traveled to France to study other buildings' architecture and floor plans before hiring Paul Emile Duboy, a French architect. The hotel began construction November 15, 1899.

By mid-1900, the ironwork had reached the fourth floor, while the facade had been built to the second floor. At the time, the building was expected to cost $800,000 and rise 14 stories. The structure was significantly taller than most of the other buildings in the vicinity, which were generally three to four stories at most. Stokes said in late 1900 that 150 people had applied for apartments at the hotel, although he had not publicly announced the building's name. Sixteen hundred workers were employed in the structure's construction by early 1901, when the hotel's facade was nearly complete. The hotel was known at the time as the Anson-Stokes, after William's grandfather, and was projected to be the world's largest hotel, beating out the old Waldorf-Astoria.

The hotel's construction was delayed by numerous labor strikes, including a six-week strike among bricklayers and a two-month strike among masonry workers. After the masonry workers went on strike in May 1902, Stokes offered $1,000 to end the strike. That August, the Bank for Savings lent the Onward Construction Company $1.5 million to complete the building. The hotel's construction was delayed by numerous other labor strikes. For example, plasterers went on strike in July 1902 for six months. Carpenters and painters, plumbers, gas installers, and marble installers each went on strike for several weeks. As the building was being completed, the plasterers struck again, prompting Stokes to abandon his plans to install Caen stone in the hotel; the painters and decorators also struck after discovering that some tenants had hired decorators from a different labor union. The strikes may have contributed to the cancellation of an 11-story stone tower at the center of the hotel, which had been proposed in early architectural drawings.

==== Opening and 1900s ====
The hotel housed 110 families by early 1903, when it was known as the Ansonia, although it had not formally opened. The hotel's ground-floor restaurant was formally dedicated on February 13, 1903, although the Broadway entrance was not yet complete. By August 1903, Stokes had leased most of the larger apartments, but many of the smaller units were still vacant. The hotel was dedicated on April 19, 1904; it had cost $6 million, eight times the original budget. The Ansonia's development coincided with that of other nearby hotels like the Empire, the Majestic, the San Remo, and the Beresford.

Although it was intended as an apartment hotel with long-term residents (many of whom remained there for decades), the Ansonia had many features characteristic of a transient hotel. When the Ansonia was completed, housekeeping service was offered to each apartment. Each room had 18 table napkins and 18 bath towels. Servants changed the table napkins and towels three times a day and the bedsheets twice a week. Other objects such as soap, stationery, and light bulbs were cleaned or replaced regularly. Although the apartments were originally priced at $600 to $6,000 a year, some of these suites were rented for $14,000 a year. Hawes wrote that the Ansonia, with its massive size, "effectively outdid every apartment building that had preceded it".

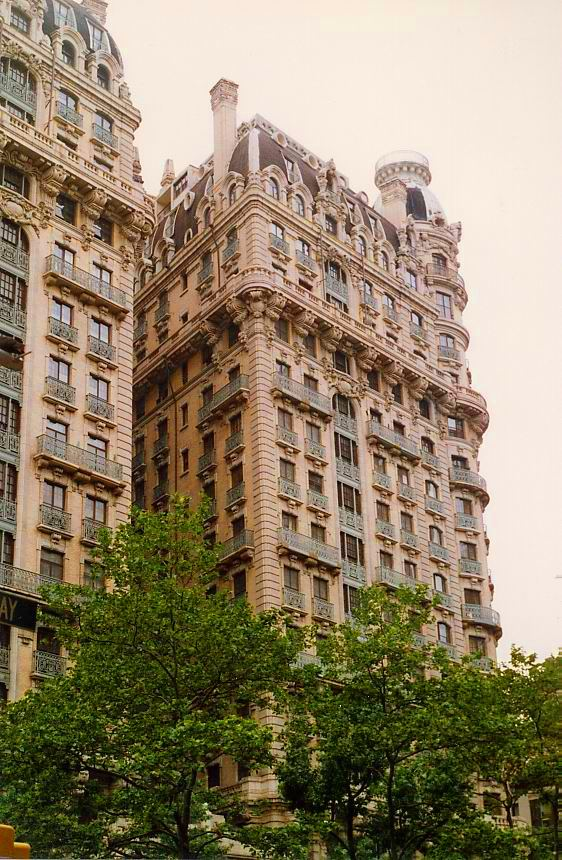
The Ansonia as seen from across Broadway

The Ansonia's thick walls and large apartment sizes attracted many musicians, particularly opera singers and conductors. It also attracted gamblers, prostitutes, and other "shady characters" in its early years. As early as 1906, Stokes had rented an apartment to gangster Al Adams, who had recently been released from prison; the next year, Adams was found in his room, dead of a gunshot wound. The Ansonia also faced several lawsuits after its completion. For example, contractor Vinton Improvement Company sued Stokes for $68,000 in 1904, claiming that Stokes had failed to pay the company while the labor strikes were ongoing. Another contractor sued Stokes in 1907 for $90,000. Stokes defended himself by claiming that Duboy was in an insane asylum in Paris and that, when Duboy signed the final plans for the hotel in 1903, he was already insane and should not have been making commitments in Stokes's name concerning the hotel. A grillroom opened at the Ansonia Hotel in December 1908.

==== 1910s and 1920s ====
In September 1911, Stokes leased the entire hotel for 30 years to Frank Harriman for $9 million. Stokes also announced that he would transfer the hotel's title to his son, W. E. D. "Weddie" Stokes Jr., but the elder Stokes would still operate the hotel. At the time, the elder Stokes had been shot several months earlier and believed that he would die. Harriman announced plans to convert the Ansonia from an apartment hotel to a transient hotel by dividing the apartments, which typically had up to eighteen rooms, into guestrooms with no more than two rooms. According to Albert Pease, who brokered the sale, the decision to convert the Ansonia into a transient hotel had been influenced by the proximity of the 72nd Street station, which at the time was only one station away from Grand Central Terminal. (Note: The next station for southbound express trains at the 72nd Street station was Grand Central. Trains were rerouted to Times Square after the original subway line was split up in 1918.) Upon taking over the hotel. Harriman spent over $100,000 on renovations, including a new restaurant and restoring the basement swimming pool. Federal and city officials thwarted a 1916 plot by German operatives Franz von Papen and Karl Boy-Ed to detonate a bomb at the Ansonia's ballroom.

Unlike his father, Weddie never had any interest in operating the Ansonia, choosing to lease it to more experienced hotel operators instead. In May 1918, the Ansonia became part of the Bowman-Biltmore Hotels chain, operated by John McEntee Bowman. George W. Sweeney was appointed as the hotel's manager. Bowman announced plans to renovate the Ansonia for $500,000, converting 300 "non-housekeeping" suites into guestrooms with bathrooms. He also planned to renovate the ground level and add a ballroom there. The hotel began to attract sportsmen like boxer Jack Dempsey, in part because of what writer Steven Gaines described as "the Ansonia's racy reputation as a home to gamblers and spies and deposed dictators". After World War I, many New York Yankees players stayed at the Ansonia, including Babe Ruth, Bob Meusel, Lefty O'Doul, and Wally Schang. One resident, Chicago White Sox first baseman Chick Gandil, held a meeting at his apartment in which he told several teammates to intentionally lose the 1919 World Series; in the ensuing Black Sox Scandal, Gandil and his teammates were permanently banned from professional baseball.

After the Ansonia was refurbished in the early 1920s, its operators published a promotional booklet for travelers who "expect more of a hotel than just a place to sleep and leave their luggage". By 1922, the hotel was worth $6.5 million, of which the land was worth $2.65 million and the building was worth $3.85 million. At the time, Stokes's wife Helen sought to divorce him, and Helen's lawyer claimed that Stokes was intentionally undervaluing the Ansonia and was receiving tens of thousands of dollars in annual rent. The same year, federal agents raided the Ansonia after discovering that its operators were selling alcoholic beverages in violation of Prohibition-era restrictions. Although the Stokeses did not divorce, W. E. D. Stokes moved out of his apartment at the Ansonia in 1925, less than a year before his death. Edward Arlington subleased the upper levels of the hotel in January 1926. At the time, the hotel had 1,218 rooms; Arlington planned to add eight stories to the hotel, with another 1,000 rooms, but this never happened. When W. E. D. Stokes died that May, Weddie inherited the hotel, which was estimated to be worth $4.5 million.

Childs Restaurants leased the hotel's Fountain Room and ground-level bank for use as a restaurant in 1927, and Keens Chop House leased the main dining room the same year. The Onward Construction Company then leased the hotel to the Ansonia Hotel Corporation until November 1928. Zue McClary, (Note: McClary's name has also been spelled "Sue".) proprietor of the Ansonia Hotel Corporation, then operated the hotel on a monthly lease from November 1928 to April 1929. McClary reportedly spent $160,000 on renovating the hotel. Although McClary claimed to have given up the hotel's lease of her own volition. her company filed for bankruptcy several months afterward. Ansco Hotel Systems Inc. took over the hotel at the beginning of May 1929, with Paul Henkel in charge. The new operators, a group of men who operated Keens Chop House, agreed to lease the hotel for 20 years for a total of $5.5 million. Walter S. Schneider was hired to design a renovation of the building costing $500,000. The plans included a gymnasium, swimming pool, ballroom, and indoor golf course. The golf course on the second floor, as well as handball courts on the roof, were unpopular and were removed shortly thereafter. The Stokes family continued to own the hotel, refusing a $14.3 million offer for the building in October 1929.

==== 1930s and early 1940s ====
With the onset of the Great Depression, the kitchens and restaurants were shuttered permanently in the 1930s, and the Ansonia stopped offering traditional hotel services such as food service and housekeeping. Musicians stopped performing on the roof, the lobby fountain's seals were relocated, and the rugs and furniture were sold off. In addition, the apartments themselves were subdivided and rearranged. The operators removed partition walls, sinks, and kitchens from 114 suites, converting them to "non-tenements", and they sold the awnings that had been mounted outside the windows. The Broadway entrance was closed, additional storefronts were created on the ground level, the gates in front of the elevators were replaced with doors, and fireproof partitions were installed around the elevator shafts. The Ansonia Hotel Corporation signed a new ten-year lease for the hotel in 1936 and announced that it would add a more modern air-cooling system to the Ansonia.

During World War II, the apartments were placed under rent control, a measure that was intended to be temporary but remained in place for half a century. In September 1942, workers began removing the Ansonia Hotel's ornamental copper cartouches and copper cornices to provide scrap metal for the U.S. military during World War II. This effort produced 100,000 lb (45,000 kg) of scrap metal. The hotel's manager Louis Zuch had said of the copper decorations, "Before we start taking off the metal railings around parks, we should collect all our useless junk"; at the time, city officials had considered removing metal railings in Central Park. In addition, the brine pipes and pneumatic tubes were removed from the walls, and the skylight at the top of the building's main staircase was blacked out. A piece of the hotel's masonry cornice fell to the ground in 1944, killing an employee.

=== 1940s sales ===
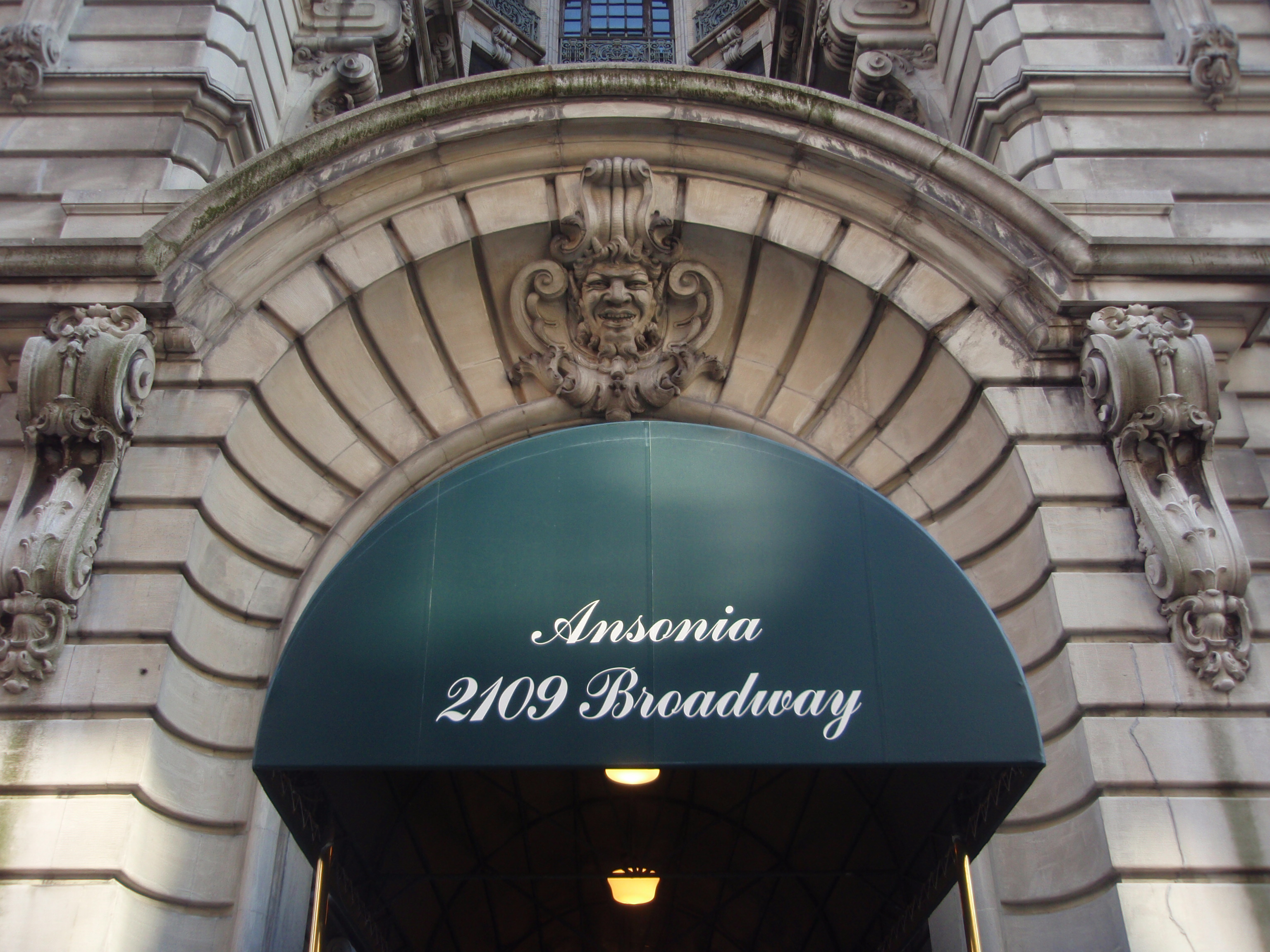
Entrance to the Ansonia

The Stokes family's Onward Construction Corporation agreed in August 1945 to sell the building to a client of attorney Abraham Traub for $2.5 million. The client, Rexby Realty, announced plans to spend $200,000 on renovating the property. That October, Louis Schleiffer agreed to buy the purchase contract for the Ansonia, as well as take over the hotel's $2.17 million mortgage. The Ansonia Realty Corporation, headed by Edwin S. Lowe, took title to the building in February 1946. That April, Lowe announced that he would convert the second floor into the Ansonia Professional Center, with 42 offices for doctors and dentists. The Dajon Realty Corporation bought the Ansonia in October 1946, paying $750,000 in cash and taking over a $1.8 million mortgage. Dajon immediately announced plans to spend $300,000 on renovations, including installing kitchenettes and refrigerators in every apartment.

Dajon resold the building in April 1948 to a group of investors known as Ansonia House Inc. At the time, the Ansonia was cited as containing 476 apartments and ten stores. The building was operated by Samuel Broxmeyer, president of Ansonia House Inc., until January 1949, when Abraham I. Menin was appointed as receiver for Broxmeyer's company. Residents claimed that Broxmeyer was significantly increasing their rent, while employees alleged that they could not cash the checks that they had received as salary. Federal officials also investigated claims that Broxmeyer was collecting advance rent from tenants and failing to pay his creditors; instead, he used the money to buy more apartment buildings. That February, tenants formed a committee to fight Broxmeyer's management of the building, and state and federal judges signed separate orders preventing the Ansonia's furnishings from being sold off. Menin was appointed as trustee of Ansonia House Inc. the same month. Some tenants refused to pay rent after Menin took over the Ansonia, prompting him to begin evicting these tenants that June. Broxmeyer was subsequently sentenced to five years in prison, and his assets were sold off.

=== Starr ownership and decline ===
==== 1950s and 1960s ====
In April 1950, a federal judge approved Menin's recommendation that the hotel be sold to a syndicate that had placed a $1.021 million mortgage on the property. The buyers, led by Jacob Starr, bought the hotel for $40,000 or $50,000 in cash and assumed a $1.623 million mortgage. The new owners then announced that they would renovate the Ansonia. However, the renovations never took place. When Starr submitted alteration plans to the Department of Buildings, he discovered that the hotel had never received a proper certificate of occupancy; before he could obtain one, he had to repair several building-code violations that the DOB had issued over the years. The issues included rattling windows, a leaky roof, and rusted ducts and pipes, as well as balconies that were on the verge of falling off the facade. Starr refused to rectify any of these building-code violations, claiming that they were too expensive to resolve, so he did not receive a certificate of occupancy. General neglect continued to characterize the Ansonia in subsequent years.

Following a series of robberies at the hotel, its managers added CCTV systems to the elevators in 1960, and vigilante groups of residents began patrolling the top floors. The New York City Landmarks Preservation Commission (LPC) began collecting photographs and other documents for several buildings, including the Ansonia, in 1963 after Fortune magazine published an article titled "Vanishing Glory in Business Buildings". At the time, the LPC did not have the power to designate buildings itself. The nonprofit organization American Music Center was headquartered at the Ansonia in the 1960s. To earn money from the hotel, Starr converted its long-abandoned basement pool to a gay bathhouse, the Continental Baths, during 1967 or 1968. The Continental Baths also hosted cabaret shows, and Bette Midler provided musical entertainment there early in her career, with Barry Manilow as her accompanist. The Continental Baths' cabaret performances attracted large crowds, especially during the weekends.

Meanwhile, the Ansonia had been reclassified as a residential hotel after the city's zoning codes were modified in 1968. Harry Garland, one of many voice coaches who lived at the Ansonia, established the building's first tenants' association, the Ansonia Residents Association (ARA). Members of the ARA petitioned a state judge to freeze the Ansonia's rents until Starr had made the repairs. After the judge ruled in the ARA's favor, Garland said that "people were concerned for my safety" because Starr was furious at him.

==== 1970s ====
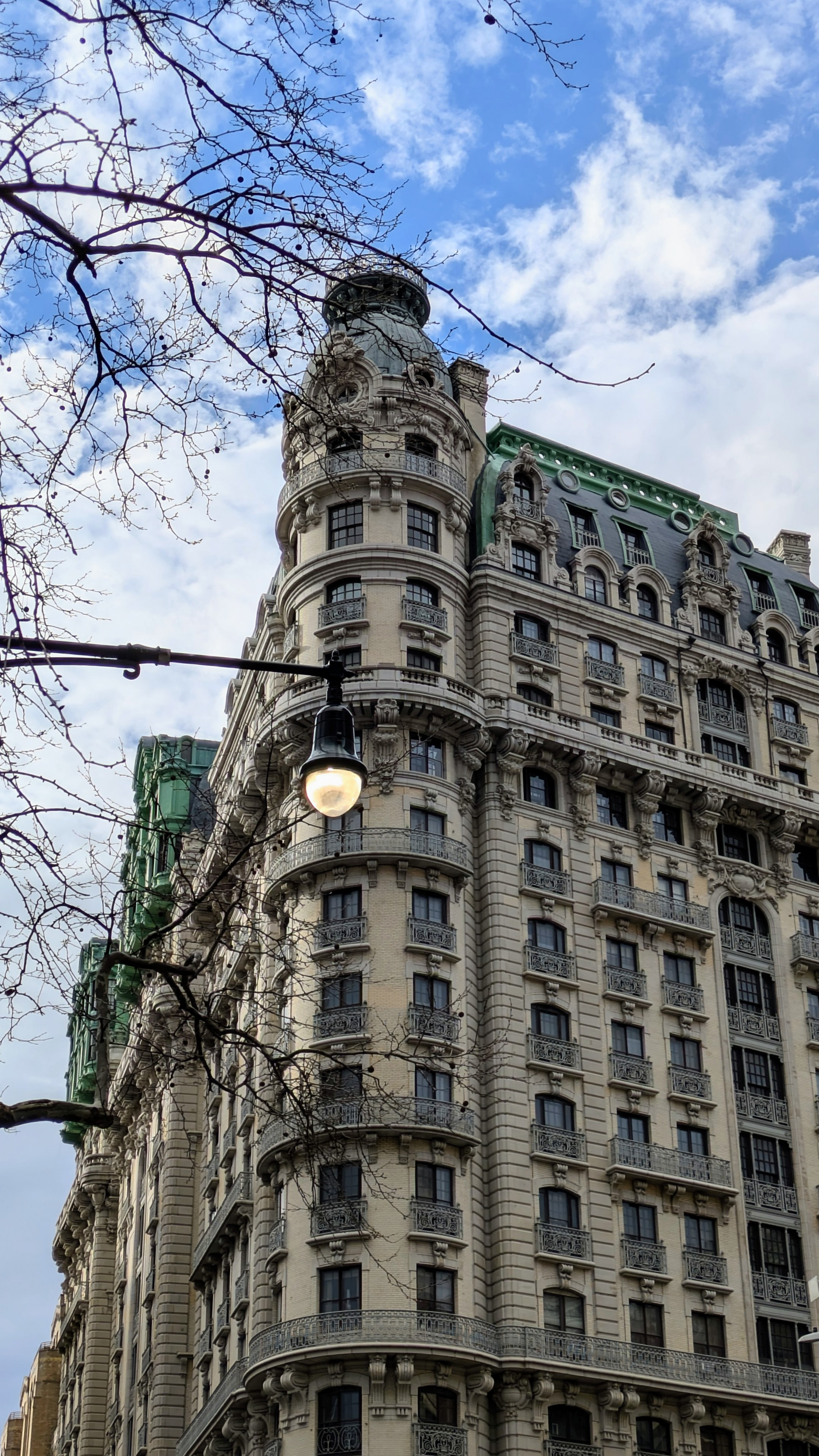
Viewed from 73rd Street

Unable to raise rents at the Ansonia, Starr announced plans to demolish it and build a 40-story tower in its place. The ARA first tried to find a rich buyer for the building, without success. Residents then asked the LPC to designate the building as a city landmark. At a public hearing in April 1970, a lawyer for Starr testified that the structure lacked "any particular historic significance". According to the lawyer, it would cost between $4 million and $5 million to repair the building, so it was easier to tear it down. This prompted concerns from residents who believed that the building would be demolished. Garland advocated for the building to be designated as a New York City landmark. In an attempt to avert the Ansonia's demolition, its residents created a petition advocating for the building to be designated as a city landmark; the petition attracted 25,000 signatures. They also hosted a five-hour gala in October 1971 to raise awareness for the Ansonia. The LPC received numerous petitions in support of the landmark designation, signed by 25,770 people, and a petition in opposition to the designation, signed by 11 people. With support from U.S. Representative Bella Abzug, who represented the neighborhood, the LPC designated the building as a city landmark on March 15, 1972, preventing the facade from being modified or demolished without the LPC's approval.

Despite the landmark designation, the Ansonia continued to suffer from what the Times called "steadily deteriorating mechanical systems and a warren-like layout". In addition, the designation only applied to the facade, as interior-landmark designations did not yet exist. (Note: The first interior landmark was designated in 1975.) By the early 1970s, dozens of crimes were being reported at the Ansonia every year, and Starr agreed to hire security guards to protect the building 16 hours a day and install alarms and taller gates. Increasing crime had prompted tenants to patrol the corridors themselves. Residents filed multiple lawsuits against the Ansonia Holding Corporation, the building's legal owner, in an attempt to force Starr to fix the hotel's many issues. The tenants only won one lawsuit through 1978, which blocked the landlord from raising the rent by 13 percent between 1976 and 1977. One tenant claimed the pipes were so dirty that she had to run her faucet for half an hour before taking a bath. while another tenant said that constant flooding had damaged a light socket in her apartment.

The Continental Baths in the basement had closed by 1973. When Starr died, his heirs also sought to sell the building, but they could not do so without first fixing the building-code issues. The New York City Conciliation and Appeals Board (CAB) placed a rent freeze on 500 rent-regulated apartments at the Ansonia in 1976, having received multiple complaints from tenants. The Plato's Retreat club opened at the hotel in late 1977. The club routinely attracted over 250 couples per night but did not allow single men to enter. As a result, men began loitering outside a pornographic shop at the building's base, which prompted the owners to close the 74th Street entrance to the building for security reasons. In addition, during the late 1970s, many psychics, fortune tellers, and mediums began moving into the building.

=== Ansonia Associates ownership ===
In 1978, the building was acquired by Ansonia Associates, a consortium of three partnerships, for $2.5 million. The consortium, headed by Herbert Krasnow, Albert Schussler, and Stanley Stahl, collectively represented 21 individuals. The group began considering converting the building into residential condominiums, devising about 30 distinct floor plans. The building's exterior had remained relatively unchanged over the years, other than modifications to the storefronts. By contrast, in 1980, Paul Goldberger of The New York Times characterized the interior as having "gone from Beaux-Arts grandeur to near dereliction", with unreliable elevators clad in false wood and a lobby that resembled "the vestibule of a skid row hotel". Over the following decades, one of the co-owners, Jesse Krasnow, began to collect hundreds of documents, photographs, building plans, and decorations.

==== Initial renovations ====
Almost immediately after acquiring the hotel, Jesse Krasnow sought to evict Plato's Retreat, since the club's presence made it difficult for Krasnow to obtain financing for a planned renovation of the Ansonia. Krasnow paid the club's operator Larry Levenson $1 million (equivalent to $3.91 million in 2025) to break his lease, and Plato's Retreat moved out of the basement in 1980, The building was added to the National Register of Historic Places the same year, at which point it had been divided into approximately 540 apartments. Krasnow began to remedy the Ansonia's building-code violations, and the owners spent $2 million on a waterproof flat roof and renovating vacant apartments. The LPC had approved repairs to the mansard roof, although the repairs to the flat roof did not require LPC approval. Residents claimed that Ansonia Associates were only conducting spot repairs and that the roof still leaked even after its renovation. By one account, the owners spent $3.5 million to repair the roof, which still leaked. The masonry facade had also started to fall apart and was being repaired.

Krasnow had spent $21 million on renovations by 1980; he had created a $4 million reserve fund for the building, and he opened a 100-space parking garage in the basement to provide income for the Ansonia. Even so, Krasnow continued to face considerable opposition from residents. The owners had renovated the 12th-floor hallway with dropped ceilings and two types of wallpaper and carpeting, intending to extend these design features to the rest of the interior. Existing residents disliked these changes so much that they asked the LPC to designate the building's interior as a city landmark. An article in The Village Voice, documenting the changes, was published under the headline "Barbarians Rape the Ansonia". Residents and officials also raised concerns that the Ansonia was being classified as a residential hotel despite no longer providing hotel services. As such, residents requested that the city's CAB recategorize the building as an apartment house.

The CAB unfroze rents for 333 apartments in early 1980 after the owners had announced their intentions to repair these apartments. The CAB unfroze each apartment's rent after that unit had been repaired. Krasnow then notified each tenant of the rent increase, to which the tenants had 72 hours to respond. The owners indicated that they would raise these apartments' rents by 46 percent, to make up for rent increases that had been deferred during the rent freeze, but some tenants received a 300 percent rent increase. This prompted the ARA to begin a rent strike in March 1980, making their rent payments to an escrow account. Some of the tenants were unable to pay the increased rates, as they were retired and lived on Social Security payments. The owners and the ARA settled their dispute in February 1981. The settlement limited the extent to which the rents could be raised, provided tenants with rent abatements and concessions, and placed restrictions on the scope of the renovations. A group of dissenting residents, led by Thomas Soja, formed the Ansonia Tenants Coalition (ATC). Members of the ATC also paid rent into an escrow account, then sued Krasnow using the interest collected from that account.

==== Condo-conversion plan and lawsuits ====
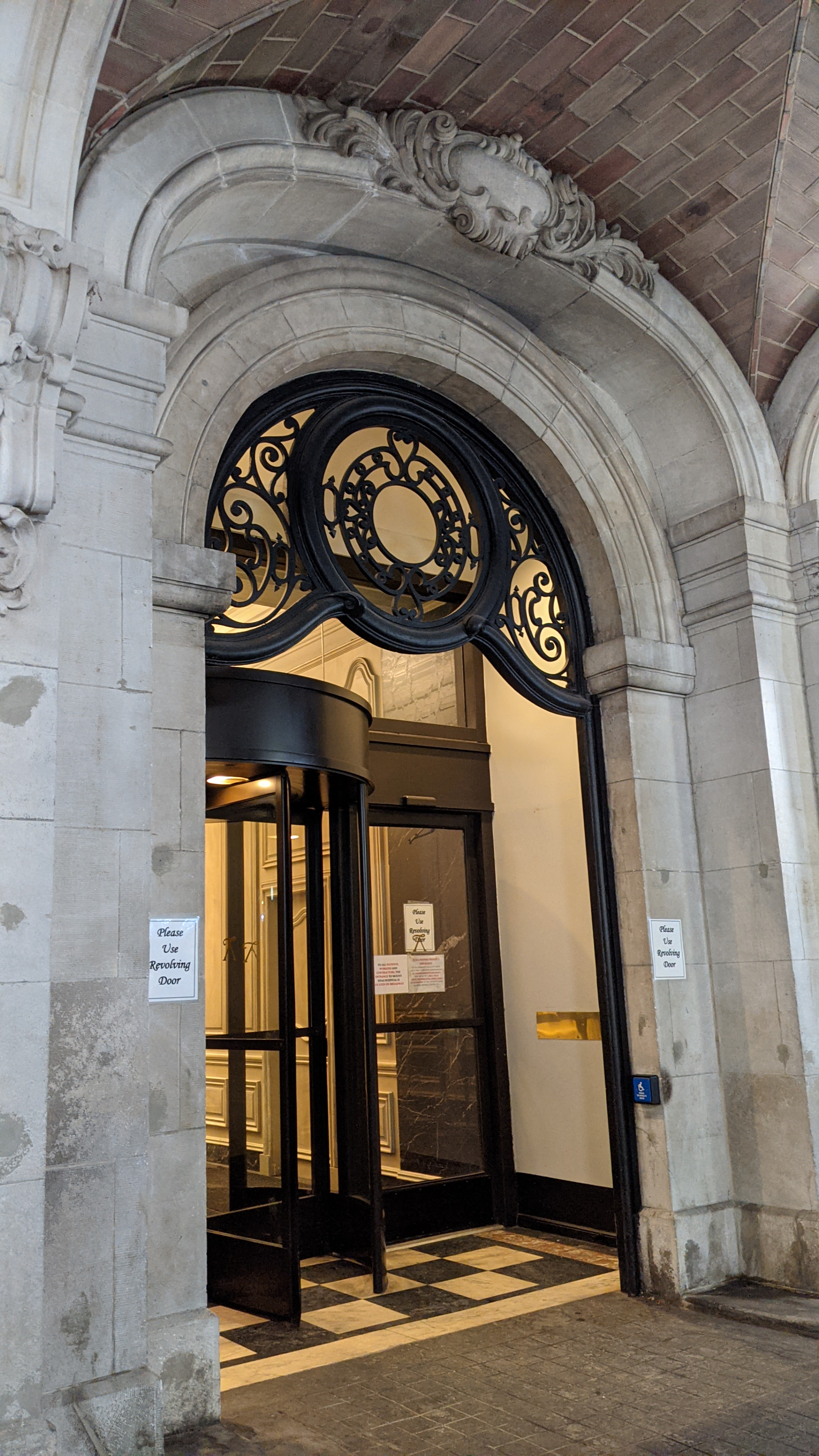
Entrance door

The Ansonia's owners planned to convert the 471 apartments on the 15 upper stories to residential condos, while retaining ownership of the ground-level storefronts and basement garage. The condos were to cost about $48,500 per room, whereas residents typically paid $150 per month per room. The Attorney General of New York could approve the Ansonia's condo-conversion plan if five percent of tenants bought condos, but tenants alleged that the building still had significant issues. By the late 1980s, the Ansonia was involved in so many lawsuits, one New York City Housing Court judge spent nearly all of his time reviewing lawsuits and settlements related to the Ansonia. In what was then the longest lawsuit in the New York City Civil Court's history, a judge denied Soja's request that the city government appoint him as the Ansonia's manager; the case involved 22,000 pages of testimony and lasted four months. In another lawsuit filed by several tenants, a state judge ruled that the owner could temporarily raise rents to pay for capital improvements, but that the owner had to undo the rent increases when the project was finished. The latter decision was later overturned.

The New York City Department of Sanitation fined the Ansonia's owners $400,000 in 1988 for failing to remove asbestos from the building, as was required under city law. Ansonia Associates had completed several aspects of the renovation by early 1990. These included a new boiler room; upgraded telephone and wiring systems; repairs to the roof; and addition of storm windows. The building also experienced several major incidents during this time. For example, a resident died in a fire in January 1990. That March, one person was killed and 16 others were injured after the plaster ceiling of a croissant shop at the Ansonia's ground level collapsed. An investigation found that the collapsed ceiling had supported the weight of a false ceiling and mechanical equipment that had been installed in the 1980s; the original ceiling had been further weakened when contractors drilled holes to install pipes and wiring.

Meanwhile, Krasnow began buying out the tenants who had most strongly opposed the condo-conversion plan. In 1990, the tenants and Ansonia Associates finally agreed on a condo offering plan, wherein they could either buy or continue to rent their apartments. Tenants who wished to buy their apartments would pay 60 percent below market rates; for a one-bedroom apartment, this equated to $125,000, although many tenants could not afford even the discounted price. Ansonia Associates initially proposed selling 50 condos for between $101,000 and $939,000, and they planned to spend between $9 million and $11 million on further renovations. The proposed renovations included restoration of the lobby, sitting rooms, and elevators; adding kitchens; adding ventilation ducts and fans to 250 units; and replacing the electrical distribution system, The main entrance on 73rd Street, a porte-cochère, would be restored. The Ansonia Tenants Association agreed to the proposal, but the Ansonia Tenants Coalition did not want the conversion to proceed until the building-code violations had been fixed.

==== Beginning of condo conversion ====
The Ansonia's condo offering plan went into effect in 1992. Frank Farinella was hired to design the condos and restore a porte-cochère on 73rd Street, and the owners replaced signage for the ground-level stores. The owners also established a $4 million capital reserve fund for the building. By 1993, Ansonia Associates had restored much of the facade, but they had yet to restore the windows, lobby, or storefronts. The owners eventually pared back the signage above the storefronts on Broadway. Tower Records announced plans to temporarily relocate to the Ansonia's basement in 1994, while its main store was being renovated, and opened a store at the Ansonia the next year. Also in 1994, the New York Court of Appeals upheld a lower court's ruling that the building could not be called a hotel. By then, The New York Times called the Ansonia "one of the most litigious buildings in the city"; at the time, the Ansonia's tenants and landlords were involved in about 60 lawsuits, which were still pending in the city's court system. In addition, the New York City Department of Environmental Protection issued the owners a building-code violation in 1995 after finding that the walls retained high amounts of asbestos.

Condo sales lagged until the late 1990s. Ansonia Associates had sold 60 apartments by 1996, at which point it had hired Zeckendorf Realty to market the building; Zeckendorf opened a sales office with three employees. The American Society of Interior Designers' New York City chapter was also hired to design four model apartments for the Ansonia, each of which was designed for a specific buyer. The Tower Records store at the Ansonia's base had closed by 1997, when Ansonia Associates was negotiating with The Food Emporium to open a store at the building. Some of the building's apartments were combined over the years after tenants had died or relocated. By the late 1990s, the building had 410 apartments, compared with 520 before the condominium conversion had started. The Food Emporium store at the building's base opened in late 1998.

==== 2000s to present ====
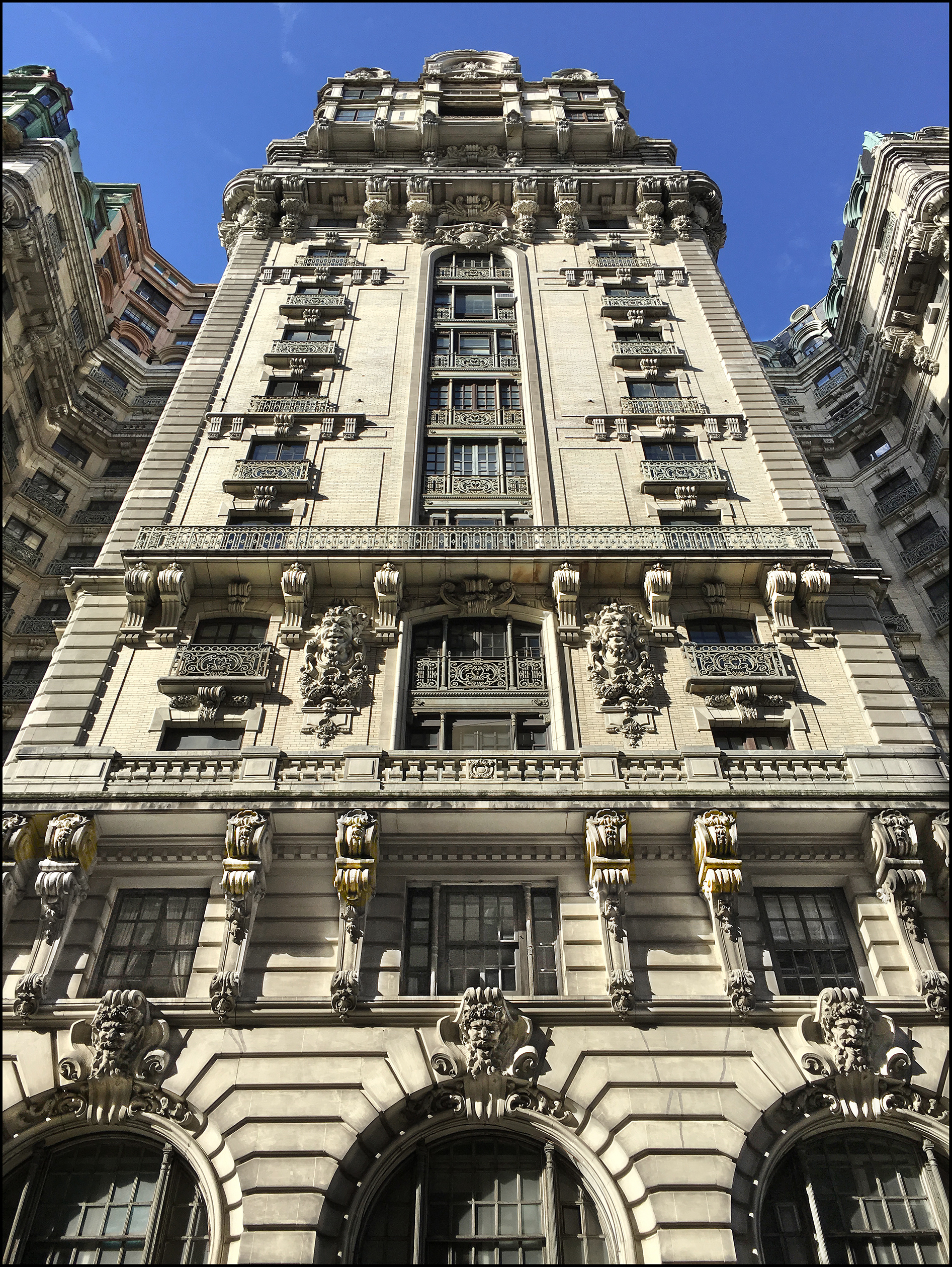
Southern facade of the Ansonia

By the 2000s, apartments were routinely selling for several million dollars, although Steven Gaines characterized the lobby as still being "a little dowdy". Apparel company The North Face renovated the ground-floor retail space at 73rd Street in the early 2000s, restoring some windows that had been hidden behind a masonry wall for several decades. By 2005, most of the rent-controlled tenants had moved out, and their units had been converted to condos. Only one-quarter of the units were rent-controlled or rent-stabilized; the remaining three-quarters of the building was composed of condominiums. According to Ansonia Realty sales director Bernie Gelb, the building had between two and five vacant apartments at any given time. Due to the building's landmark status, condo owners could not replace the windows when renovating their apartments; in addition, Ansonia Realty had to approve all subleases of the condos. A Loehmann's store opened in the building's basement in 2007, within the space formerly occupied by the Continental Baths and Plato's Retreat.

The building continued to face lawsuits over the years, and it had been the subject of more than 800 lawsuits by 2014. For instance, a resident sued the Ansonia's managers in 2007, alleging that the building was infested with cockroaches, and a family sued their neighbor over cigarette smoke the next year. By 2011, the Times reported that prices at the Ansonia, and at other condominiums on the Upper West Side, were higher than at housing cooperatives along Central Park. Apartments continued to be sold for millions of dollars, although 27 apartments were sold between 2009 and 2014 for less than $500,000. Some rent-regulated tenants also remained in the building.

== Notable tenants ==
The Ansonia's residents have worked in a variety of fields from the arts to sports. It was nicknamed "The Palace for the Muses" because many of its residents were musicians and artists. In general, these residents were not also members of high society; Hawes wrote that many residents "represented elements still considered alien or unsavory to old-fashioned society people". The Ansonia was particularly popular in the opera community, leading Opera World magazine to write in 1963: "In short, scarcely anyone in the opera business has not, at one time or another, lived in the Ansonia, where residence was regarded as the first step toward success in a precarious and overcrowded field". It is unknown why the Ansonia attracted so many opera performers, but several factors, including the hotel's thick walls and air-cooling system, have been cited. Many of the residents were also musicians or music students. Some residents had clauses in their leases that allowed them to play music without restrictions from 9 a.m. to 9 p.m. This privilege did not extend to hosting music classes in the apartments, which led to a lengthy lawsuit in the mid-1990s.

After the building was converted to condominiums in the 1990s, it began to attract lawyers, doctors, and financiers. One writer for the Times wrote in 1985 that the "Ansonia has probably gotten as much panache from the names who have lived there as it has gained from its own name". Residents have included:

- Frances Alda, soprano
- Martin C. Ansorge, U.S. representative
- 'Abdu'l-Bahá, son and chosen successor of Bahá'u'lláh, the founder of the Bahá'í Faith
- Sarah Bernhardt, actress
- Billie Burke, actress; lived with her husband Florenz Ziegfeld Jr.
- Enrico Caruso, tenor
- Feodor Chaliapin, bass
- Fausto Cleva, conductor
- Richard and John Contiguglia, concert pianists
- Royal S. Copeland, U.S. senator
- Jack Dempsey, boxer
- Theodore Dreiser, writer
- Richard Dreyfuss, actor
- Geraldine Farrar, soprano and actress
- Sam Franko, conductor
- Chick Gandil, baseball player
- Giulio Gatti-Casazza, opera manager
- Anna Held, actress; lived with her husband Florenz Ziegfeld Jr.
- Victoriano Huerta, Mexican dictator
- Sol Hurok, impresario
- Angelina Jolie, actress
- Andre Kostelanetz, conductor; lived with his wife, Lily Pons
- Lillian Lorraine, actress
- Gustav Mahler, composer and conductor
- Lauritz Melchior, tenor
- Yehudi Menuhin, violinist
- Bob Meusel, baseball player
- Mae Murray, actress
- Lefty O'Doul, baseball player
- Charles Henry Parkhurst, clergyman
- Ettore Panizza, composer
- Roberta Peters, soprano
- Ezio Pinza, bass
- Lily Pons, soprano; lived with her husband, Andre Kostelanetz
- Ashley Putnam, soprano
- Elmer Rice, playwright
- Isaac L. Rice, businessman; lived with wife Julia Barnett Rice
- Julia Barnett Rice, activist; lived with husband Isaac L. Rice
- Babe Ruth, baseball player
- Bidu Sayão, soprano
- Ignacio Sánchez Mejías, bullfighter
- Wally Schang, baseball player
- Tito Schipa, tenor
- Antonio Scotti, baritone
- Eleanor Steber, soprano
- Teresa Stratas, soprano
- Igor Stravinsky, composer
- Arturo Toscanini, conductor
- John Wesley De Kay, American entrepreneur and self-made millionaire, playwright, author, and eccentric socialite
- Florenz Ziegfeld Jr., impresario; lived with his wives

== Impact and legacy ==
=== Reception ===
When the building was being developed, in 1902, the New-York Tribune characterized the Ansonia as "an up-to-date specimen of apartment architecture". A reporter for The New York Times wrote in 1980 that the Ansonia "looks from midtown like a turreted fortress in the middle of upper Broadway". Christopher Gray wrote in 1987 that the Ansonia, along with the Apthorp and the Belnord, "gave a cosmopolitan electricity to" the section of Broadway north of 59th Street. In the 1983 book New York 1900, Robert A. M. Stern and his coauthors wrote that the building "transformed Parisian prototypes into a veritable skyscraper". A representative for the Municipal Art Society said that, had the Ansonia been demolished, "our city would have suffered far more than the loss of a Beaux-Arts masterpiece". Vogue magazine wrote in 2025 that the building was both architecturally and historically important, praising its "impossibly elegant limestone, granite, white brick and terracotta facade".

=== Influence and media ===
The presence of the building influenced David Childs's design of the Alexandria, constructed at Broadway and 72nd Street in 1990. That development contains an illuminated octagonal cupola as a homage to the Ansonia's turrets. The Laureate condominium building at Broadway and 76th Street, completed in the 2000s, also contains balconies, curved corners, and rusticated blocks inspired by those of the Ansonia.

The building has been depicted in several media works. The facade was used as a set for the 2012 TV show 666 Park Avenue, whose producer David Wilcox said he had been attracted by the building's "absolutely fascinating" history. Its facade was also depicted in the TV show The Marvelous Mrs. Maisel, standing in for the fictional "Dansonia". In addition, the Ansonia has been used as a setting or filming location for movies such as The Sunshine Boys (1975), Three Days of the Condor (1975), Hannah and Her Sisters (1986), Life and Nothing But (1989), Single White Female (1992), Uptown Girls (2003), and Perfect Stranger (2007). Rod McKuen included a song titled "Full Moon Over the Ansonia Hotel" on his 1977 album Slide... Easy In.. In the 2001 film "Don't Say a Word," the character, a psychiatrist played by Michael Douglas, lives in this building with his wife and daughter; several scenes feature its beautiful facade and lovely interior hallways.

== See also ==
- List of buildings and structures on Broadway in Manhattan
- List of former hotels in Manhattan
- List of New York City Designated Landmarks in Manhattan from 59th to 110th Streets
- National Register of Historic Places listings in Manhattan from 59th to 110th Streets
- Soldiers' and Sailors' Monument (Manhattan), also co-designed by DuBoy
