= Luke Barnett =

American actor, writer, and producer

- Born: February 13, 1983 (age 43); Clinton, Maryland, U.S.
- Occupations: Actor; writer; producer
- Known for: Funny or Die

Luke Barnett (born February 13, 1983) is an American actor, screenwriter, director, and producer. He is best known through his work on the website Funny or Die where he created "The Walking Fred" and other comedy videos.

== Early life ==
Barnett was born in 1983 in Clinton, Maryland, a suburb of Washington, D.C. Having pursued acting since 2000, and with an interest in promoting social change, he moved to Los Angeles by 2005. His father is a pastor.

== Early career ==
In his early career, Barnett was best known for his comedic acting and writing on Funny or Die films.

In the early 2000s, in Los Angeles, Barnett landed a role in a play about homeless youth called The Playground. According to Barnett, the production opened doors for him both as an actor and as an advocate for social justice. By 2007, he began to get credited screen roles, including three episodes of MANswers. In 2011 he was in three television series and six films, including Sedona, Coffin, and The Amityville Haunting. In 2012 he appeared in Static. Barnett's films also include a 2013 short called The Newest Testament (a Biblical parody which he produced, co-wrote, and stars in as Jesus), The Scribbler (2014), and The Treehouse (2015).

For his theatre work, in 2011 Barnett was praised by Backstage for his "facile array of increasingly outrageous cameo roles" in Bayside High School Musical, a musical parody of the 1990s teen sitcom Saved by the Bell. In the musical, Barnett played 10 different characters, and was credited as "Everyone Else" in the playbill.

=== Funny or Die ===
Barnett's Funny or Die films have garnered national and international attention. In his first major project for Funny or Die, Barnett starred in, co-wrote, and co-produced Growing Up With Gosling (2012), in which Barnett plays the childhood best friend of actor Ryan Gosling, who has tried to cast him as his co-star in all of his movies, including The Notebook, Ides of March, Crazy, Stupid, Love, Lars and the Real Girl, and Drive. Barnett always gets replaced at the last minute by the studio, which nearly always wants a female co-star. The short screened at several festivals including the LA Comedy Festival, the Los Angeles Film, Television and New Media Festival, the Playhouse West Film Festival, and the Laugh Track Comedy Festival. It won the Best Comedy Short award at the 2012 Los Angeles Film, Television and New Media Festival.

Barnett next starred in, co-wrote, and co-produced Kickstarter to help Luke & Tanner do COOL STUFF!, which premiered in April 2013. The film spoofs several Kickstarter crowdfunding campaigns by already successful, wealthy celebrities to finance new projects such as the Veronica Mars film and the Garden State sequel. Barnett and Tanner Thomason appeal to celebrities to donate money to regular folks like them, so they can watch the celebrities' films and do other cool stuff – in exchange for rewards like "verbal confirmation, to a stranger, of how rad the Veronica Mars movie was". In reviewing the spoof, Mashable noted that "... Hollywood stars have recently come under fire for using Kickstarter because, as the argument goes, they may deflect attention from lesser-known filmmakers who rely solely on crowdfunding to support their projects." Barnett was interviewed by Mashable regarding the Kickstarter spoof, and he and Thomason were interviewed about it on Southern California Public Radio. The film was also featured on news sites including News Hour 24 and France 24 and other political and international sites.

In September 2013 Barnett co-wrote, co-produced, and starred in A Message to Aaron Sorkin, which spoofs the opening scene of Sorkin's show The Newsroom. Barnett plays the lead character, Will McAvoy, played in the series by Jeff Daniels. Of the Newsroom spoof, Huffington Post said it "nails everything that's wrong with Aaron Sorkin's show". Entertainment Weekly noted that "Mirroring the opening scene of the series nearly shot-for-shot, ... Funny or Die seamlessly parodies the show by asking bizarro Will McAvoy, 'Can you say why The Newsroom is the greatest show on television?'" Perez Hilton opined that "As smart as the show tries to be, a new parody video from Funny or Die may be even SMARTER!" The spoof was also featured on ESPN's Grantland, The New York Observer, and international sites such as 56.com.

== Filmography ==
=== Film ===
Year	Title	Role	Notes
2002	Orange County	Bon-Fire Friend	Uncredited
2007	Mama's Boy	Cool Guy Skater	Uncredited
2008	Safehouse	Mitchell	
2010	Weeding Out	Glenn	
2010	You, Only Better...		
2011	Sedona	Nicholas	
2011	Coffin	Pete	
2014	The Scribbler	Orderly	
2014	Making the Rules	Mexican Restaurant Waiter	
2015	400 Days	Reporter	
2016	Pandemic	Desperate Infected	
2016	Aaron's Blood	Officer Vaughn	
2020	Faith Based	Luke	Also writer and producer
2023	Dark Obsession	Clark	
2024	Push	Dr. Waller	

=== Television ===
Year	Title	Role	Notes
2003	Grounded for Life	Nick	Episode: "Tonight's the Night"
2007	Manswers	Stoner Joe	3 episodes
2021	List of a Lifetime	Franceso	TV movie
2023–2026	For All Mankind	Mike Shaw	2 episodes
