= Sunny Doench =

American actress

- Born: 21 May 1972 (age 53); Dayton, Ohio, United States
- Other names: Sunny Knox
- Occupation: Actress
- Years active: 1993–present

Sunny Doench (born May 21, 1972, Dayton, Ohio) is an American actress. She was reportedly the original choice to play the title character's sidekick Gabrielle in Xena: Warrior Princess, but reportedly declined because she did not want to move away from her boyfriend. She has been married to Nathan John Stricker since August 23, 2014.

== Filmography ==
=== Film ===
Year	Title	Role	Notes
1993	Death Run to Istanbul	Lola	Video
1994	Backlash	Jennifer Parker	
1999	Forgiven	Caroline	Short film
2000	Talk of the Town		
2001	Double Deception	Jodi Baker	
2002	Only in Hollywood	Helen Wheeler	
2002	Drama Queen	Sally Maid	Short film
2004	Black Cloud	Reporter #1	
2004	Border Blues	Helen	Video
2004	Love Thy Neighbor	Shelley	Short film
2005	Blue in Green	Camille	
2007	Remember the Daze	Mrs. Turner	
2008	Downloading Nancy	Newsreporter	
2008	A Darker Reality	Jesse Metcalfe	
2009	Good and Decent People	Sabrina	Short film
2009	The Corporate Cut Throat Massacre	Beth	
2010	Adalyn	Camryn	Short film
2011	Coffin	Rona Samms	
2011	The Girl with No Number	Nancy Wilson	
2015	Kindness to Strangers	Jan	Short film
2017	Hope Dances	Tina Douglas	Feature film
2017	Coffin 2	Rona Samms	Feature film

=== Television ===
Year	Title	Role	Notes
1996	Night Stand with Dick Dietrick	Cyndi / Penny	"Greek Dreams", "Eurotrash"
2000	Beverly Hills, 90210	Martha Gunderson	"The Easter Bunny"
2001	The Dating Zone	Host	TV series
2003	Russians in the City of Angels	Helen	"Rebenok. Chast 1"
2007	The Starter Wife	Cosmetic Girl	"Hour 3"
2008	Las Vegas		"Secrets, Lies and Lamaze"
2009	The Hallway	Emily	TV film
