= Gerald McCullouch =

American actor and filmmaker (born 1967)

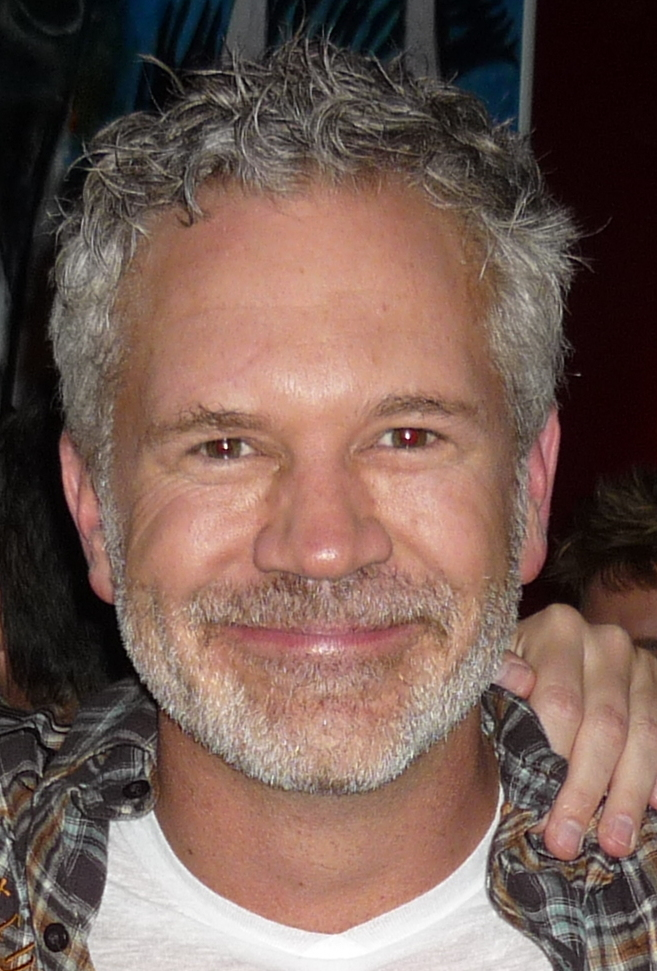
- Born: March 30, 1967 (age 59); Huntsville, Alabama, U.S.
- Occupations: Actor, film director, screenwriter, singer
- Years active: 1990–present
- Website: http://www.gerald.biz/

Gerald McCullouch (born March 30, 1967) is an American actor and filmmaker. He is best known for playing Bobby Dawson on CSI: Crime Scene Investigation.

== Biography ==
=== Early life ===
McCullouch, an Irish-American, was born in Huntsville, Alabama. He got his first professional performing job at 16 as a singer in the country western revue at Six Flags Over Georgia. He declined a scholarship to Savannah College of Art and Design to study in the BFA Musical Theatre Program at Florida State University. After surviving a near fatal car crash during his second year, which left him in a coma, he began his career in Atlanta, Georgia.

=== Acting career ===
McCullouch is a recurring guest host of FYE! on E! TV airing in nearly 500 million homes worldwide. His performance in Pirates of Silicon Valley, received a mention in the Daily Variety. He also played Jesus in the European tour of Jesus Christ Superstar. He has appeared in numerous commercials and print campaigns – having billboards in Times Square and on Sunset Boulevard and has performed stand up at LA's world-famous Improv. As a director/writer his Award-winning short film The Moment After has received critical acclaim and festival screenings worldwide. McCullouch has been in many publications, including the New York Daily News, Los Angeles Daily News, Jezebel, The Advocate, and the Instinct.

He was on the Law & Order: Special Victims Unit episode "Quickie", which aired on January 6, 2010. He portrayed a father of a teenage girl who died.

He also appears as Roger in the films BearCity, BearCity 2: The Proposal and BearCity 3. He guest starred in the Trust Your Gut episode of Chicago Med as Don Adams, and in The Ghost in the Machine episode of Bones as Trevor Gibson and with Amber Tamblyn in the Last Temptation episode of House M.D.

In 2018, he appeared Off-Broadway in Perfect Crime at The Theater Center and in MsTrial at New World Stages in 2020.

In 2021, he appeared in Miami New Drama’s experimental theatre production based on 7 Deadly Sins, in Kaufman’s All I Want is Everything, in the role of Leo.

=== Directing ===
McCullouch's feature debut as a director, Daddy, was released in 2015. A film which he also starred in. It is an adaptation of Dan Via's stage play of the same name, in which he had also appeared in both the NY and LA productions.

He directed the documentary All Male, All Nude and its followup All Male, All Nude: Johnsons, which explore two different male strip clubs in Georgia and Florida, respectively.

He is currently working on another documentary, Stuck in Greece, about LGBT refugees in Greece.

He also previously directed the short film The Moment After.

== Filmography ==
Year	Film	Role	Other notes
1999	Smut	Reporter	
1999	Pirates of Silicon Valley	Rod Brock	(TV movie)
2000	Home the Horror Story	Medium Cop	
2000	Auggie Rose	Mr. Lark	
2002	The Moment After	Tracey	(Short)
2006	Locked	Rhys O'Connor	
2009	Hungry for Love	Lamont Fowler	(Short)
2010	BearCity	Roger	
2010	The Mikado Project	Dennis	
2011	Trouble in the Heights	News Announcer	(voice-role)
2012	BearCity 2: The Proposal	Roger	
2012	Little Consequences	David	(Short)
2014	The Haircut	Buddy No. 2	(Short)
2015	Daddy	Colin McCormack	
2015	The Atticus Institute	Steven West	
2016	BearCity 3	Roger Beam	
2018	Trophy Boy	Mark	(Short)
2019	The Divorce Party	Alex	
2019	Blood Bound	Sheriff Martin Sparks	
Year	Television series	Role	Other notes
1990	In the Heat of the Night	Tom	TV series, 1 episode
1994	Chicago Hope	N.D. Technician No. 2	TV series, 1 episode
1995	Beverly Hills, 90210	Dan McGrath	TV series, 4 episodes
1998	7th Heaven	John Gorman	TV series, 1 episode
1998–1999	Melrose Place	Frank	TV series, 2 episodes
2000–2010	CSI: Crime Scene Investigation	Bobby Dawson	TV series, 36 episodes
2003	NCIS	FBI Agent	TV series, 1 episode
2007	Law & Order: Criminal Intent	Kevin Quinn	TV series, 1 episode
2010	Law & Order: Special Victims Unit	Ben McWilliams	TV series, 1 episode
2011	House	Bobby Pearson	TV series, 1 episode
2012	Bones	Trevor Gibson	TV series, 1 episode
2012	Failing Upwards	Martin	TV series, 1 episode
2012–2014	Hustling	Geoffrey	TV series, 12 episodes
2014	High School Possession	Priest	(TV movie)
2017	Chicago Med	Don Adams	TV series, 1 episode
2019	The Haves and the Have Nots	Lieutenant Maler	TV series, 1 episode
2019	FBI	Mike Chapman	TV series, 1 episode
2019	Messiah	Dean Jim Parker	TV series, 1 episode

== Personal life ==
In January 2009, McCullouch was on the New York City subway when a man attempted to steal his laptop; McCullouch, a trained boxer, successfully fought him off, even when the thief attempted to stab him with a kitchen knife. The thief was arrested by New York City police officers. He had previously been robbed at gunpoint in Atlanta in 2001.

McCullouch is gay and has directed and starred in several gay-themed productions. He previously dated professional basketball player Derrick Gordon. He was listed as one of the most compelling people of the year by Out in their OUT 100 alongside Ricky Martin, Alan Cumming, Rachel Maddow and others and won the Independent Series Best Supporting Actor Award for his appearances in the web series Hustling.
