= B-Girl (film) =

- Directed by: Emily Dell
- Written by: Emily Dell
- Produced by: Elizabeth Dell; Steven Ritchie
- Starring: Julie Urich; Missy Yager; Wesley Jonathan; Drew Sidora; Aimee Garcia; James Martinez
- Cinematography: Alan Caudillo
- Edited by: Tamara Friedman
- Music by: Greg S. Reeves
- Distributed by: Sony Pictures Home Entertainment
- Release date: 29 July 2009
- Running time: 103 minutes
- Country: United States
- Language: English

B-Girl is a 2009 dance film written and directed by Emily Dell and starring Julie Urich, Missy Yager, Wesley Jonathan, Drew Sidora, Aimee Garcia, James Martinez and based on director Emily Dell's 2004 short film of the same name.

== Plot ==
In Brooklyn, Angel is a breakdancer who lives with her mother Gabby. Her abusive boyfriend Hector won't accept that she wants to break up. One night Angel and her best friend Rosie trade hats and jackets and Hector fatally stabs Rosie thinking she is Angel. When he realizes his mistake he stabs Angel too. After many weeks of recovery, Angel wants to breakdance again but is having difficulty. Gabby moves with Angel to Los Angeles to live with Angel's grandmother, where she believes Angel will be safe. Angel gets a night job at a car rental company and goes to college during the day. She also joins a group of breakdancers who need a sixth member to compete.

== Cast ==
- Julie Urich as Angel
- Missy Yager as Gabby
- Wesley Jonathan as Carlos
- Drew Sidora as Righteous
- Aimee Garcia as Rosie
- James Martinez as Hector
- Richard Yniguez as Father Rivera
- Jenny Gago as Crescencia
- Oren Michaeli as Tejon
- Jonathan Perez as Rico
- Keith Stallworth as Junior
- Richard Steelo Vasquez as Silas
- Ivan Velez as Trece
- Marcelo Tubert as Professor Leasing
- Robert Cicchini as Dr. Volchek
- Josue Figueroa as Beast
- Bunnie Rivera as Maria
