= American Swing =

- Directed by: Matthew Kaufman
- Starring: Ron Jeremy; Buck Henry; Al Goldstein; Annie Sprinkle; Helen Gurley Brown; Larry Levenson; Jamie Gillis; Veronica Vera; Betty Dodson
- Distributed by: Magnolia Pictures
- Release date: 2008
- Country: United States
- Language: English

American Swing is an American 2008 documentary about the 1970s phenomenon of swinging at Plato's Retreat in New York City directed by Matthew Kaufman.

== See also ==
- The Lifestyle
- Swingtown
- Plato's Retreat
- Open marriage
