= Out to Win (2015 film) =

- Directed by: Malcolm Ingram
- Produced by: Malcolm Ingram; Doug Langway; Matt Thomas
- Production company: TCB Productions
- Release date: March 15, 2015
- Country: United States
- Language: English

Out to Win is a 2015 American documentary film, directed by Malcolm Ingram. The film chronicles the history of LGBT participation in professional sports, concentrating in particular on key figures such as John Amaechi, Billy Bean, Jason Collins, Wade Davis, Brittney Griner, Billie Jean King, David Kopay, Conner Mertens, Martina Navratilova, and Michael Sam.

The film had its premiere on March 15, 2015 at SXSW.

== See also ==
- List of lesbian, gay, bisexual or transgender-related films of 2015
