= Continental Baths =

Gay bathhouse in New York City (1968–1976)

- Early ad for the Continental Baths
- Interactive map of the Continental Baths area
- Alternative names: Plato's Retreat

General information
- Type: Gay bathhouse
- Location: Ansonia Hotel, New York City, United States
- Coordinates: 40.7801°N 73.982°W
- Opened: 1968
- Closed: 1976
- Management: Steve Ostrow

Other information
- Facilities: Pool, dance floor, fountains, private rooms, orgy rooms, saunas, games room, restaurant

The Continental Baths was a gay bathhouse in the basement of the Ansonia Hotel in New York City, which was operated from 1968 to 1976 by Steve Ostrow. It was advertised as reminiscent of "the glory of ancient Rome".

It opened after Ostrow observed the crowds at Everard Baths and he wanted to improve on the Everard atmosphere of being "sleazy, secretive, unkempt, not to mention unfriendly." "Ostrow's business plan in 1968 was to create a gay fantasia, a palace devoted to hedonism." Ostrow said "from the first night, there were lines around the corner." Some patrons said they would have 150 sexual encounters in a single visit. Opened a year before the Stonewall riots, the bathhouse was raided by the police about 200 times, Ostrow said.

While the baths utilized the Ansonia's lavish Gilded Age décor for a Roman style bath, it is probably best remembered as being an influential offbeat music venue. Ostrow installed a stage designed specifically for a DJ, claimed to be the first of its type in the world. Discs were spun by Frankie Knuckles and Larry Levan.

He then began showcasing live acts which were the launching points for Peter Allen, Nell Carter, Wayland Flowers, Ellen Greene, Labelle, Melissa Manchester, The Manhattan Transfer, Barry Manilow, Bette Midler, Melba Moore, Jane Olivor, and Liz Torres. The act most associated with the bathhouse was Midler who was accompanied by Manilow on the piano. Midler debuted her song "Friends" at the bathhouse and later recorded an album entitled Bathhouse Betty. The performances were actually open to the public and not just bath patrons. The gay crowd dwindled because they didn't like the public in the bathhouse and felt they were being gawked at. Ostrow cancelled the live performances in 1974 before closing the baths in 1976.

It re-opened as the straight swingers venue Plato's Retreat in 1977.

== Facilities ==
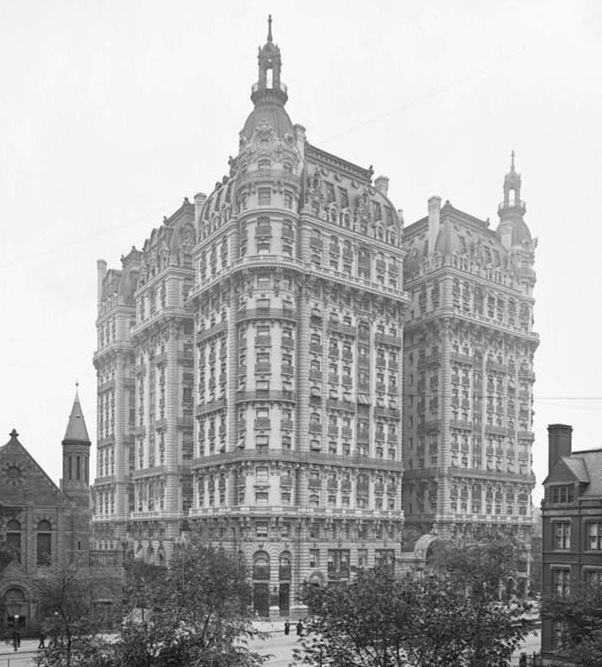
The Ansonia Hotel, New York City, c. 1905

The features of this bathhouse included a small disco dance floor, a cabaret lounge with a baby grand piano (both only feet from a narrow "Olympia blue" swimming pool), sauna rooms, bunk beds in public areas, and tiny rooms as one would find in any gay bathhouse. The facility had the capacity to serve nearly 1,000 men, 24 hours a day.

One gay guide from the 1970s described the Continental Baths as a place that "revolutionized the bath scene in New York City."

Some features of the Continental Bathhouse included a warning system that tipped off patrons when police arrived. There was a weekly STD clinic, a supply of A200 (a lice-killing shampoo) in the showers, a mouthwash dispenser, and K-Y Jelly in the candy vending machine.

The documentary film Continental by Malcolm Ingram covers the height of the club's popularity through the early 1970s.

== Entertainment ==
An attraction at the club was the entertainment provided by performers such as Barry Manilow and Bette Midler. Due to her performances at the baths, Bette Midler earned the nickname Bathhouse Betty. It was at the Continental, accompanied by house pianist Barry Manilow (who, like the bathhouse patrons, sometimes wore only a white towel), that she created her stage persona the Divine Miss M.

Despite the way things turned out [with the AIDS crisis], I'm still proud of those days [when I got my start singing at the gay bathhouses]. I feel like I was at the forefront of the gay liberation movement, and I hope I did my part to help it move forward. So, I kind of wear the label of 'Bathhouse Betty' with pride.

— Bette Midler, Houston Voice

Despite Midler's constant complaints about "that goddamn waterfall," her poolside performances were so successful that she soon gained national attention, beginning with repeat performances on The Tonight Show Starring Johnny Carson.

== Closing ==
The Continental Baths had lost much of its gay clientele by 1974. The reason for the decline in patronage was, as one gay New Yorker was quoted, "We finally got fed up with those silly-assed, campy shows. All those straight people in our bathhouse made us feel like we were part of the décor and that we were there for their amusement."

By the end of 1974, patronage was so low that Steve Ostrow had decided to discontinue the lounge acts. He focused, instead, on resurrecting his business by making the baths coed. He even advertised on WBLS, but to no avail. In the end, Ostrow closed the Continental Baths for good.

The facility was reopened in 1977 as Plato's Retreat, a heterosexual swingers' club. Plato's Retreat relocated to W. 34th St. in 1980 then was shut down by the city of New York at the height of the AIDS epidemic.

== Police raids ==
In February 1969, the New York City Police raided the Continental Baths. Twenty-two patrons, whom an undercover, towel-clad policeman identified as having offered to have sex with him or actually had sex with him, were arrested. This happened again in December of the same year, when police entered the Continental Baths and arrested three patrons and three employees, charging them with committing lewd and lascivious acts and criminal mischief, respectively.

== Bibliography ==
- Miller, Neil (1995). Out of the Past, Gay and Lesbian History from 1869 to the Present. Vintage. ISBN 978-0-679-74988-2. (2005 rev. ed. ISBN 978-1-55583-870-6)
- Butler, Patricia (2002). Barry Manilow: The Biography. Omnibus Press. ISBN 978-0-7119-8547-6.
- Jarman, Derek (1987). The Last of England. Constable. ISBN 978-0-09-468080-7.
