= Plato's Retreat =

Former heterosexual sex club in Manhattan, New York (1977–1985)

Coordinates: 40.780°N 73.982°W

- Interactive map of Plato's Retreat
- Location: New York City, New York, United States
- Owner: Larry Levenson; Fred J. Lincoln
- Type: Swingers club

Construction
- Opened: 1977
- Closed: 1985

Plato's Retreat was a heterosexual swingers' club catering to couples. From 1977 until 1985 it operated in two locations in Manhattan, New York City, United States. The first was the former location of the Continental Baths, a gay bathhouse that also showcased artists who went on to great success including Bette Midler, Barry Manilow, and Melissa Manchester.

== Establishment ==
In 1976, Larry Levenson, a high school friend of Al Goldstein and a former fast-food manager who was selling ice cream at Coney Island, was introduced to the swinging lifestyle by a woman he met at a bar. After organizing swinging parties himself for a time, he opened a club "for swingers" in 1977, in the basement of the Kenmore Hotel on East 23rd Street between Lexington and Third Avenue (145 E 23rd St), and called it "Plato's Retreat." The same year, he moved it to the basement of the Ansonia Hotel, an early 20th-century building on 2109 Broadway between West 73rd and West 74th Streets on the rapidly gentrifying Upper West Side of Manhattan. The hotel used to house the Continental Baths, a gay bathhouse where singer Bette Midler, often accompanied by Barry Manilow on a baby grand piano, first became a national figure.

== Rules and premises ==
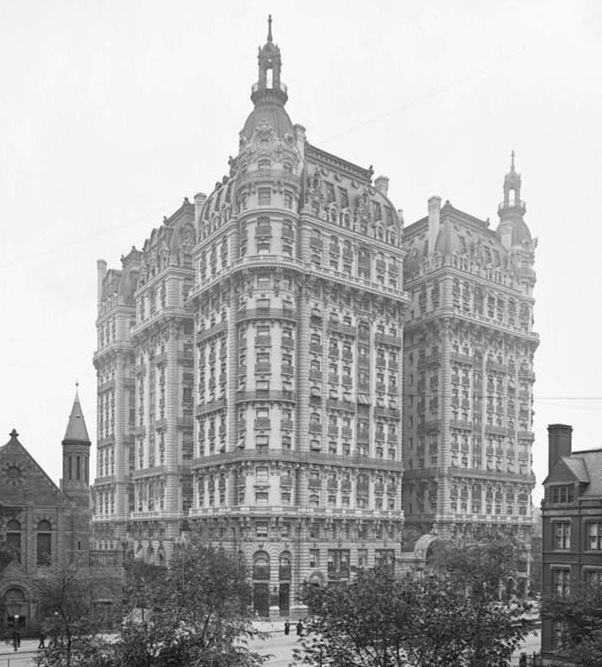
The Ansonia Hotel, 2109 Broadway, location of Plato's Retreat (1977–80)

Plato's Retreat was a "members-only" establishment that was legally not a public business. This meant that members had to follow the club's rules. Levenson did not allow men unaccompanied by a woman to enter. This was an attempt to block male homosexuals, and he also prohibited male-male sexual activity between the men that did get in. Woman on woman sex, however, he encouraged. Unaccompanied women were welcome, often at a discounted rate, or free. Once a woman left a room after a sexual encounter, her male companion had to accompany her within two minutes. This rule was intended to control the male–female ratio. Alcohol and other drugs as well as paid sexual services were all forbidden, but the prohibitions were not enforced, which would have been difficult at best. In later years sex workers did frequent the premises and there was "rampant" use of drugs (most often quaaludes) by patrons.

According to a 1979 advertisement in Screw magazine, the club offered, besides a heated swimming pool, a steam sauna, whirlpool baths, disco dancing, free bar and buffet, "cozy living rooms and lounging areas", a "variety of swing areas", and a backgammon lounge.

== Fame ==
During its heyday, Plato's Retreat was considered the world's most infamous sex club, popular with celebrities, porn stars, and well-to-do couples. The clientele was described as "an assortment of kinky types from the suburbs: dry cleaners and their wives, or fat men in toupees with their heavily made-up girlfriends." Owner Levenson often partook in sexual activity on the premises, once winning a bet against Al Goldstein and 'Butch' Katz, owner of 42nd Street's Roxy Burlesk theater, that he could ejaculate fifteen times within a twenty-four-hour day. George Urban visited the club to film a segment for his television show The Ugly George Hour of Truth, Sex, and Violence.

In 1979, Levenson opened Plato's West, on Ivar Avenue in Los Angeles, but the venture, "a failed attempt at franchising", was not successful and lasted only six months.

In 1980, Plato's relocated to 509 West 34th Street.

== Decline and closure ==
In 1985, New York City Mayor Ed Koch backed the New York City Health Department's decision to shut down the city's gay bathhouses, in response to concerns over the spread of HIV/AIDS. In closing the gay bathhouses while allowing the heterosexual swingers' clubs – most notably Plato's Retreat – to remain open, the city found itself in violation of the newly adopted anti-discrimination law. The Health Department, with Koch's approval, reacted by ordering the heterosexual clubs, including Plato's Retreat, to close as well. The club's Manhattan location was shut down on New Year's Eve 1985, ostensibly for violating public-health ordinances. At the time of the shutdown, officials argued the club was a place of prostitution (observed during undercover operations), and operated without a certificate of occupancy. Levenson argued that the undercover agents constructed the prostitution evidence on the premises while investigating.

In 1981, Levenson and his by-then two partners along with Plato's accountant were tried and convicted for tax evasion. When the prosecutor asked Levenson—who was the only owner to take the stand—why Plato's kept its accounting records off the premises, Levenson replied, "Where would I keep them, in the swimming pool?" He served an 8-year prison sentence at the Allenwood federal prison. After serving his sentence, Levenson worked in various jobs, such as cab driver. He died in 1999 after a quadruple bypass heart surgery.

== In Florida ==
The descendant of Plato's Retreat was Plato's Repeat. It first appeared in 1995 in a listing of adult establishments in Miami, a "very unique pvt club". It then opened as a BYOB club at 321 Sunrise, Fort Lauderdale, Florida, run by "the wife of the original owner". (Larry Levinson's 1999 obituary does not mention a wife.) It was an on-premises heterosexual swingers' club, open Monday to Sunday from eight p.m. until the last person left. Saturday night was for couples only.

In 2006, Plato's Repeat closed; the Fort Lauderdale building reopened in 2016 as a gay men's sex club under the name "321 Slammer", keeping the same bring-your-own format.

In the 2010s, there are reportedly numerous on-premises swingers' clubs operating in South Florida.

== In popular culture ==
In 1978, Joe Thomas released a disco single, "Plato's Retreat," with lyrics referring to the club. The 2009 documentary American Swing relates the story of Plato's Retreat with archival footage and interviews.

In 1980, Citrus Productions released the high-budget adult film Plato's: The Movie, based on the club, directed by Joe Sherman.

In 2006, Aaron Sorkin's Studio 60 on the Sunset Strip referenced Plato's Retreat. In Season 1 Episode 3, The Focus Group, the ex-husband of newly named NBS President for Entertainment Programming, Jordan McDeere, is attempting to cash in on her newfound notoriety (and a conservative Christian backlash against NBS's flagship sketch show) by shopping a tell-all memoir, which includes tales of her accompanying him to sex clubs at his request.

A scene in Spike Lee's film Summer of Sam takes place at Plato's Retreat.

Pro wrestler Jesse Ventura would occasionally wear "Plato's Retreat" T-shirts during wrestling interviews in both the AWA and WWE.

== See also ==
- Exhibitionism
- Sexual liberation
