= Tail Lights Fade =

- Directed by: Malcolm Ingram
- Written by: Matthew Gissing (story and screenplay); Malcolm Ingram (story)
- Produced by: Christine Haebler
- Starring: Jake Busey; Breckin Meyer; Denise Richards
- Cinematography: Brian Pearson
- Edited by: Reginald Harkema
- Music by: Neil Weisensel
- Production company: Gold Load Productions
- Distributed by: Trimark Pictures
- Release date: 3 December 1999 (Canada)
- Running time: 87 minutes
- Country: Canada
- Language: English

Tail Lights Fade is a 1999 Canadian film directed by Malcolm Ingram and starring Denise Richards, Jake Busey, and Breckin Meyer. The film follows two couples and their race across Canada to bail one of their brothers out of a marijuana charge by clearing out the grow house completely. The film's namesake gets its title from a 1992 Buffalo Tom song, which is also on the soundtrack.

== Cast ==
- Denise Richards as Wendy
- Jaimz Woolvett as Ben
- Breckin Meyer as Cole
- Jake Busey as Bruce
- Elizabeth Berkley as Eve
- Tanya Allen as Angie
- Ben Derrick as Cutlass Mike
- Doug Hardwick as Accountant Tom (as Douglas Hardwick)
- Marcus Hondro as Shadley (as Marcus Hondros)
- Tristin Leffler as Hemp Girl (as Tristen Leffler)
- Tyler Labine as Grower Brian
- Matthew Gissing as Thug #1 (as Matt Gissing)
- Darryl Quon as Thug #2 (as Darryl Quan)
- Gordie Giroux as Boy
- Lisa Marie as Kitty
- Jason Mewes (uncredited)

== Production ==
Writer/director Malcolm Ingram described the experience as being very unpleasant to handle.
