= Malcolm Ingram =

Canadian film director (born 1968)

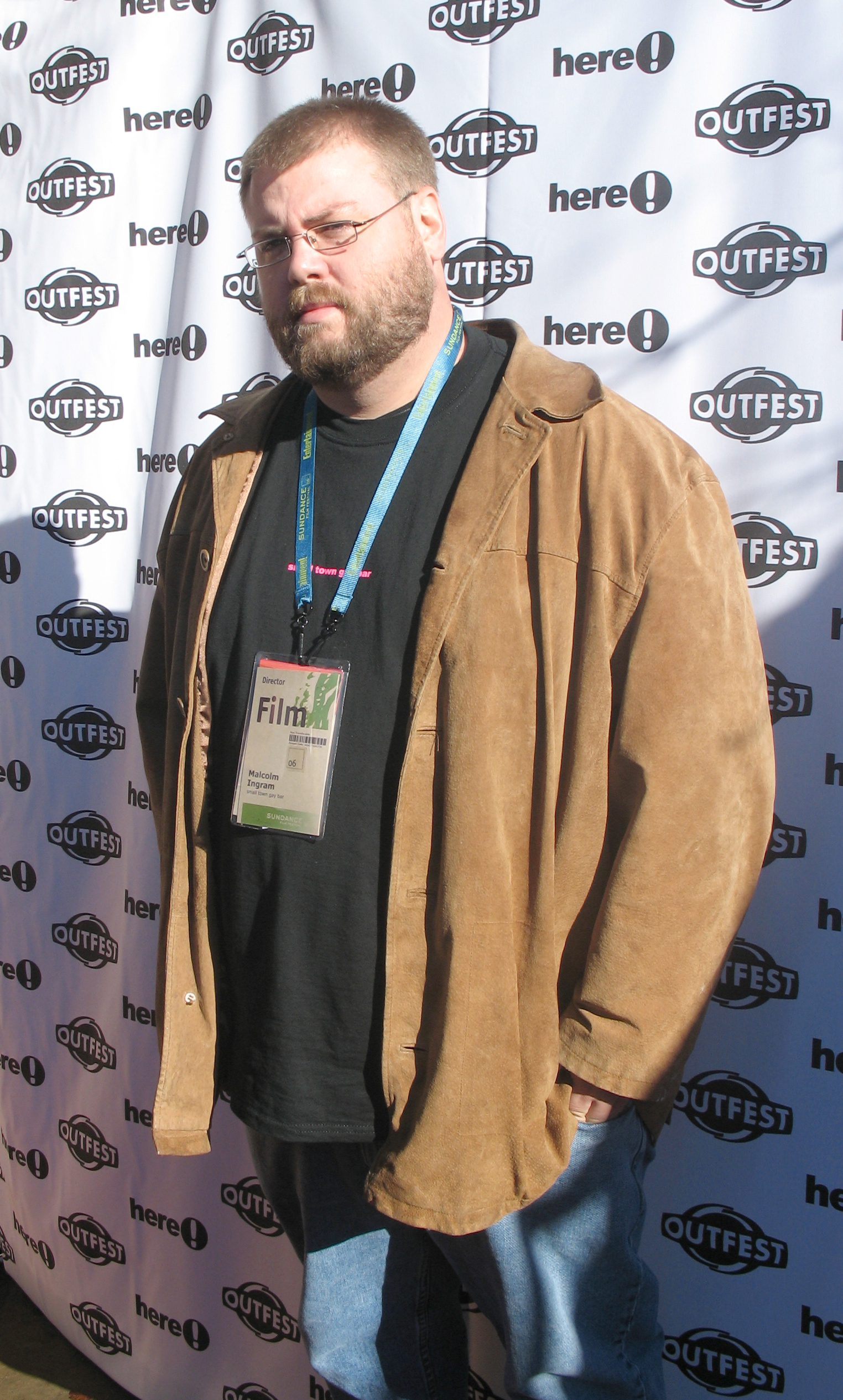
- Ingram at the 2006 Sundance Film Festival
- Born: 1968 (age 57–58); Toronto, Ontario, Canada
- Occupations: Film director, podcaster

Malcolm "Mo" Ingram (born 1968) is a Canadian independent film director and podcaster.

== Directing ==
Ingram wrote and directed Drawing Flies, which was produced by Scott Mosier and Kevin Smith of View Askew Productions. He also made Tail Lights Fade and Small Town Gay Bar, a documentary which received acclaim at the 2006 Sundance Film Festival.

In 2007, Ingram appeared on the cover of A Bear's Life, a gay magazine, with friend Kevin Smith. Smith unveiled the magazine during an appearance on Late Show with David Letterman.

Ingram premiered his fourth film, a documentary entitled Bear Nation at SXSW on March 14, 2010.

His film Continental, about the legendary gay baths in New York City, premiered at SXSW on March 10, 2013. Out to Win, a documentary film about LGBT people in sports, was released in 2015.

== Internet radio/podcasting ==
Ingram is a multiple-time guest host on Smith's SModcast, where he was often the figure of fun, particularly for an incident in the 14th episode, where he vowed to cut off his little finger if the present Canadian Prime Minister wasn't Paul Martin. It was Stephen Harper. Ingram did not cut off his little finger. In 2010 Ingram began hosting his own podcast, alongside his mother Gloria, Called the Toronto Ontario Mo & Glo(ria) show, hosted on Smith's SModcast.com site. There they discuss many different subjects, amongst other things the fact that he is gay. In May 2010 he declared that he would be stopping production of the podcast indefinitely, citing his mother's lack of availability to record; since then, however, there have been sporadic releases of the show.

It was announced with the hiatus of the Toronto Ontario Mo & Glo(ria) show that he would be doing a new podcast called, Blow Hard which made its debut at SModcastle, on August 18, 2010. Besides Kevin Smith, the show was usually co-hosted by either Jason Mewes, gay porn star Brent Corrigan or lesbian actress/screenwriter Marja-Lewis Ryan. Ingram discontinued Blow Hard after 90 episodes, leaving the SModcast network to start another podcast through Film Threat. However, in late October 2016, Ingram and Mewes rebooted Blow Hard with new episodes consisting of mainly general conversations (similar to the format of SModcast with Smith and Mosier). The first new episode was posted on October 24, 2016.
