= Isaac L. Rice Mansion =

Mansion in Manhattan, New York

- U.S. National Register of Historic Places
- New York State Register of Historic Places
- New York City Landmark
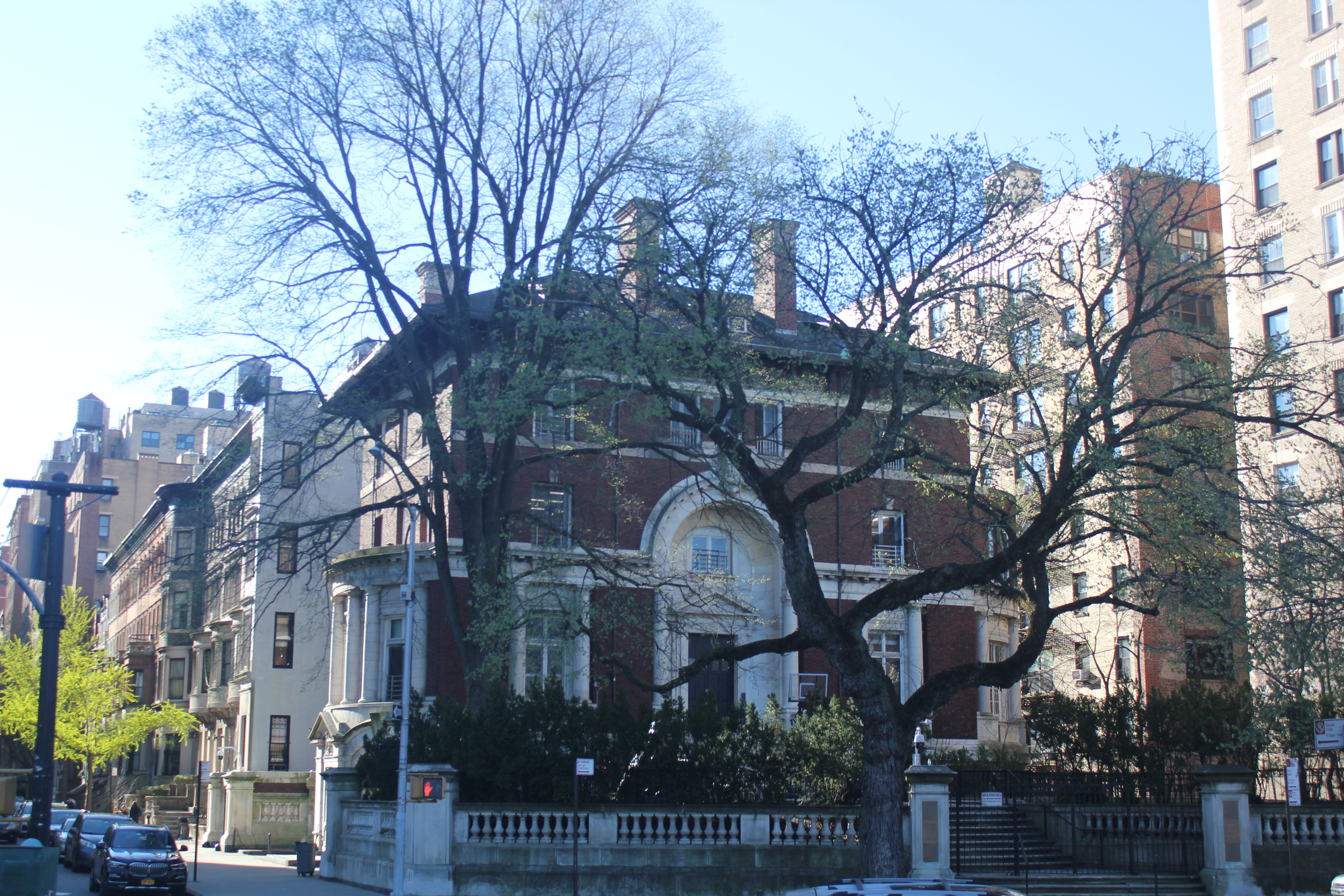

- Location within Manhattan Location within New York City Location within New York Location within the United States
- Location: 346 West 89th Street, Manhattan, New York, United States
- Coordinates: 40°47′29″N 73°58′43″W
- Area: 0.3 acres (0.12 ha)
- Built: 1901
- Architect: Herts & Tallant
- Architectural style: Colonial Revival, Beaux Arts, Italianate, Georgian
- NRHP reference No.: 80002711
- NYSRHP No.: 06101.001760
- NYCL No.: 1089

Significant dates
- Added to NRHP: June 25, 1980
- Designated NYSRHP: June 23, 1980
- Designated NYCL: February 19, 1980

The Isaac L. Rice Mansion (also the Isaac L. Rice House, Villa Julia, and the Solomon Schinasi House) is a mansion on the Upper West Side of Manhattan in New York City, New York, US. Located at 346 West 89th Street, at the corner of Riverside Drive, it was designed by Herts & Tallant. The house was built between 1901 and 1903 for the family of the businessman Isaac Rice and his wife Julia. Several further expansions in the 20th century, designed by C. P. H. Gilbert, Bloch & Hesse, and William Lazinsk, are similar in style to the original building. The Rice Mansion has served as a yeshiva since 1954 and is one of only two free-standing mansions extant on Riverside Drive. The house is a New York City designated landmark and is listed on the National Register of Historic Places.

The mansion was designed in a mixture of the Colonial Revival, Italianate, Georgian, and Beaux-Arts architectural styles. The brick and marble facade is four stories high, with an attic and basement; the house is surrounded by a marble perimeter wall. There is a double-height entrance arch along Riverside Drive. On 89th Street, the first two stories are curved outward and contain a porte-cochère and a carved bas relief panel. The building is topped by a hip roof, clad with Spanish tiles. The mansion's interior was decorated in classical architectural styles, and was designed to be soundproof. It was built with spaces such as a main hall, library, and dining room on the main floor; a chess room in the basement; and bedrooms on the upper stories. Although subsequent tenants have modified the interior spaces over the years, the house largely retains its original interior layout.

At the end of the 19th century, Isaac Rice and his wife Julia sought to erect a residence in a quiet part of New York City. The Rices bought the site at Riverside Drive and 89th Street in 1900 and hired Herts and Tallant as the house's architects. When the Rice family moved to the Ansonia Hotel in 1907, they sold it to the tobacconist Solomon Schinasi, whose family modified the house in 1908, 1912, and 1927. The Schinasi family lived there until around 1945, after which the Heckscher Foundation for Children leased it. Yeshiva Chofetz Chaim acquired the house in 1954. The yeshiva attempted to sell and demolish the mansion in the late 1970s, prompting a heated dispute with local preservationists. The house was taken over in 1988 by another Jewish day school, Yeshiva Ketana, which restored the house in the 1990s. There has been positive architectural commentary of the house over the years.

== Site ==
The Isaac L. Rice Mansion is at 346 West 89th Street, at the southeast corner of Riverside Drive and 89th Street, on the Upper West Side of Manhattan in New York City, New York, US. The house occupies an irregular plot with frontage of 148 feet (45 m) wide on 89th Street to the north and 116 feet (35 m) on Riverside Drive to the west; the plot extends 100 feet (30 m) back from 89th Street. (Note: The Riverside Drive frontage has been cited as being around 110 feet (34 m), and the lot itself has been cited as extending 101 feet (31 m) back of 89th Street.) The house itself is rectangular, measuring roughly 62 by 38 feet (19 by 12 m), with a semicircular annex to the south and a rectangular annex to the southeast. It is aligned with the rest of the Manhattan street grid (parallel to 89th Street and neighboring buildings), toward the eastern portion of the site. When the house was finished in the early 1900s, it was surrounded by terraced gardens.

The house was originally surrounded by a brick wall designed by Herts & Tallant, the mansion's overall architect. The wall was a solid masonry structure measuring 7 feet (2.1 m) high, interspersed with six pillars measuring 15 feet (4.6 m) high. The brick perimeter wall was demolished in 1912 because it protruded past the lot line, and it was replaced by a marble wall designed by C. P. H. Gilbert. The house is across from the Soldiers' and Sailors' Monument within Riverside Park to the west. Rice had specifically selected the site of his house because it faced the monument, and the mansion's marble perimeter wall is designed similarly to the monument's balustrades. The Rice Mansion is also near the Normandy apartment building, which is two blocks to the south.

The house was one of several freestanding mansions that were built along Riverside Drive and Park in the late 19th and early 20th centuries, at a time when developers envisioned Riverside Drive as a rival to the millionaires' row on Fifth Avenue. The plot immediately to the south was owned by the brewer George Ehret and the department store retailer Benjamin Altman in the late 19th century, neither of whom built their houses there. Immediately to the north was a house belonging to Elizabeth Clark (whose family owned the Dakota apartment building). As part of an agreement that Altman made with William W. Hall in 1898, the Rice Mansion site was restricted to single-family residential use and had to be at least four stories high. By the early 21st century, the Rice Mansion was one of two remaining freestanding mansions on Riverside Drive, along with the Schinasi Mansion. The Rice Mansion was also the only mansion on the avenue that retained some of its original gardens; the other mansions had mostly been replaced with apartment buildings.

== Architecture ==
The Isaac L. Rice Mansion was designed for the businessman and lawyer Isaac L. Rice by Herts & Tallant, who were known for designing Broadway theaters such as the New Amsterdam, Liberty, and Lyceum. The mansion was designed in a mix of the Colonial Revival, Italianate, and Georgian styles, and it also incorporates Beaux-Arts architectural elements. Local news sources in the early 20th century compared the house to an Italian villa or a Swiss chalet. C. P. H. Gilbert designed an annex in 1908 and a marble perimeter wall in 1912, while Bloch & Hesse and William Lazinsk were responsible for additional annexes in 1927. All of these additions were designed in a similar style to Herts & Tallant's original mansion. The building is four stories high with an attic and a basement.

=== Facade ===
The facade is made of brick and marble. The use of brick in the facade was common among neo-Georgian buildings, whereas the marble details were intended to be reminiscent of the Beaux-Arts style. Marble was used for the stairs, gardens, terraces, and archway.

==== Riverside Drive ====
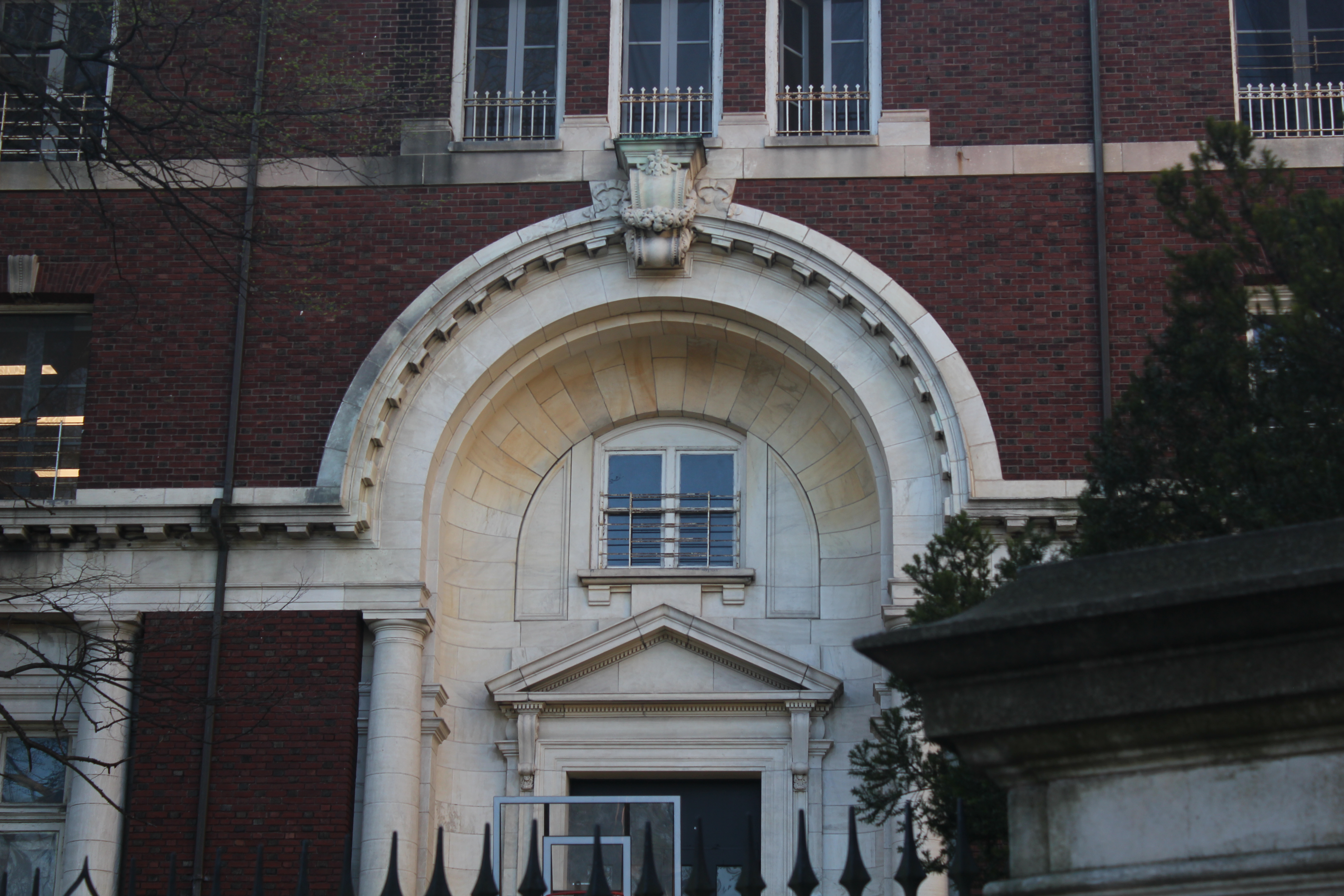
Close-up of Riverside Drive archway

The primary elevation of the mansion's facade faces west toward Riverside Drive and is divided vertically into three bays. There is an entrance on the second story of the Riverside Drive elevation, accessed via a wide exterior stairway measuring 40 feet (12 m) wide. While the original plans called for twenty granite steps, with a stone balustrade and electric lamps on either side, the current staircase has ten steps. The stairway to the house was narrowed in 1912 when the balustrade around the mansion was rebuilt.

The Riverside Drive entrance is a double-height arch, which rises to the third story. The archway is similar to the New Amsterdam Theatre's original archway, which the firm also designed. The lower portion of the arch is flanked by a pair of engaged columns in the Tuscan order. Within the arch, the walls are faced in marble. The arch has a second-story doorway topped by a pediment and a double window. The upper portion of the arch is outlined by a string course with modillions. A keystone shaped like a console bracket is placed at the very top of the arch. On either side of the arched doorway, the second story forms a piano nobile flanked by Tuscan or Doric engaged columns. Miniature balustrades with stone panels are placed in front of the entrance. Above the story is an entablature with modillions, which is interrupted by the archway. The third-story windows have flat lintels influenced by English architecture. String courses run horizontally across the facade at the third and fourth stories as well.

==== Other elevations ====
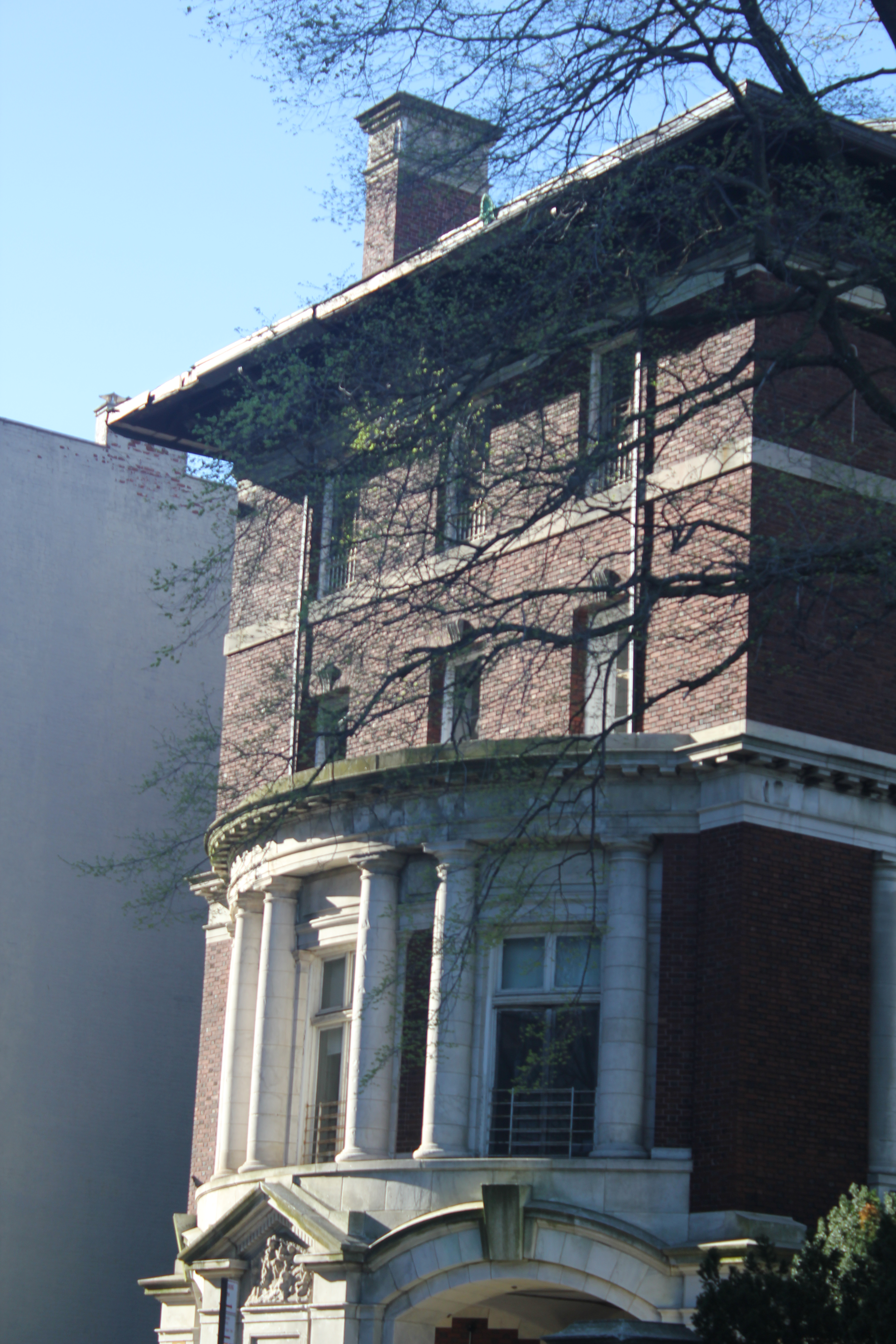
89th Street facade

On 89th Street, the first two stories are curved outward from the rest of the building and are clad with marble. At ground level, there is a porte-cochère for vehicles, which is composed of two segmental arches leading to a ground-floor entrance. Each arch is topped by a keystone. Between the arches of the porte-cochère is a carved bas relief panel depicting six children, who likely represent the Rices' sons and daughters. The sculpture is attributed to Louis St. Lannes (or Lanne), who also designed a statue outside the Rice Memorial Stadium in Pelham Bay Park. The second story consists of windows with Doric engaged columns on either side, above which is an entablature with modillions. There is another porte-cochère on 89th Street, which is attached to the house; the one-story structure fits two cars and was designed by Bloch and Hesse in 1927.

The rest of the original facade is made of brick and is topped by a cornice with modillions and escutcheons. A hip roof, clad with Spanish tiles, overhangs the cornice. The north side of the roof has a skylight. The western and eastern sides of the roof each have three dormer windows that illuminate the attic, while the southern side has a single dormer. The house was originally constructed with four chimneys, two each to the west and east. There is also a brick elevator shaft to the east.

At the southeast corner is a two-story annex designed by Gilbert in 1908. This annex is attached to the original mansion's eastern wall, which has very little ornamentation. Gilbert also added a semicircular bay to the southern elevation, similar to the design of the original mansion. The semicircular bay contains windows flanked by Doric engaged columns, as well as an entablature above the second story. The southern elevation additionally includes a two-story arched entrance, which is similar to the design of the Riverside Drive arch. The southern arch is topped by a keystone, with three windows above.

=== Interior ===
Isaac Rice and his wife Julia Barnett Rice had wanted the house to be soundproof because their six children (Muriel, Dorothy, Isaac Leopold Jr., Marion, Marjorie, and Julian) were loud. The mansion's interior was decorated in classical architectural styles, with marble fireplaces, wooden ceilings, stained glass windows, and a marble staircase. Although various subsequent tenants have modified the interior spaces over the years, the house largely retained its original interior layout in the late 20th century. Many of the original fireplace mantels also remain, along with wood paneling. The mechanical and electrical systems have also been upgraded. The original house had one elevator, and a second was constructed in 1927.

The main hall measures 35 by 35 feet (11 by 11 m). Its ceiling is made of plaster and is divided into coffers with rinceaux and foliate motifs. On the northern and southern walls of the main hall are tall doorways with moldings and pilasters, which lead to various rooms. The room to the north is the former library, whose eastern wall contains an elaborate fireplace mantel. The library's mantel is flanked by pilasters with ornate capitals, which support a shelf with carved rinceaux and a central medallion. When the Rices lived in the mansion, the library had a carving of a blind beggar (which Dorothy Rice reportedly sculpted using only a hairpin), as well as a bronze bust of a rabbi also designed by Dorothy. South of the main hall was the dining room, which had wood paneling relocated from the St. Louis World's Fair. One source from 1907 described it as "one of the handsomest rooms in the house", with 40 types of wood used in the ceiling and walls.

In the basement was a chess room where Isaac Rice often arranged matches with competitors abroad. Designed in the Arts and Crafts style, the chess room was a double-height space measuring 22 by 22 feet (6.7 by 6.7 m), with space for six tables. The room had a ventilation system, and it was soundproofed so Isaac could concentrate during matches. Other features of the house included wine vaults, billiards rooms, a fitness room, a studio, an infirmary room, and a garage that could fit several vehicles. The fourth floor contained a gymnasium for the Rice children.

The house's original staircase was made of wood; this was replaced in 1908 by an iron-and-marble stairway, designed by Gilbert in the Italianate style. The lower part of the staircase has a marble balustrade with coats of arms and rosettes. On the upper stories, the staircase has an iron balustrade with rosettes, as well as landings with protruding balconies. The upper stories were used as bedrooms. Each of the Rice children designed their bedrooms according to their own tastes; for example, Isaac Jr. and Julian decorated their respective rooms with machinery. On the fourth floor, there is a room with a plaster ceiling that contains moldings, a frieze, and geometric motifs.

== History ==
=== Use as residence ===
At the end of the 19th century, Isaac and Julia sought to erect a residence in a quiet part of New York City, away from Broadway. The Rices obtained a 75-by-100-foot (23 by 30 m) site at 88th Street and Riverside Drive from Egbert Viele in June 1899, paying $125,000 (equivalent to $4,837,500 in 2025 (Note: 1634–1699: McCusker, J. J. (1997). How Much Is That in Real Money? A Historical Price Index for Use as a Deflator of Money Values in the Economy of the United States: Addenda et Corrigenda (PDF). American Antiquarian Society. 1700–1799: McCusker, J. J. (1992). How Much Is That in Real Money? A Historical Price Index for Use as a Deflator of Money Values in the Economy of the United States (PDF). American Antiquarian Society. 1800–present: Federal Reserve Bank of Minneapolis. "Consumer Price Index (estimate) 1800–".)) for that site. Isaac Rice was reportedly persuaded to buy the neighboring plot to the north at 89th Street while watching a parade from the roof of Viele's house. In October, the Rices bought the site to the north for $225,000 (equivalent to $8,708,000 in 2025) or $235,000 (equivalent to $9,095,000 in 2025). As partial compensation, Isaac Rice relinquished ownership of the 88th Street site. Rice planned to spend $200,000 (equivalent to $7,740,000 in 2025) to erect the residence on 89th Street. The Real Estate Record and Guide predicted that the mansion would be "another handsome dwelling in an avenue which, during the year, has sprung into architectural and social fame".

==== Rice ownership ====
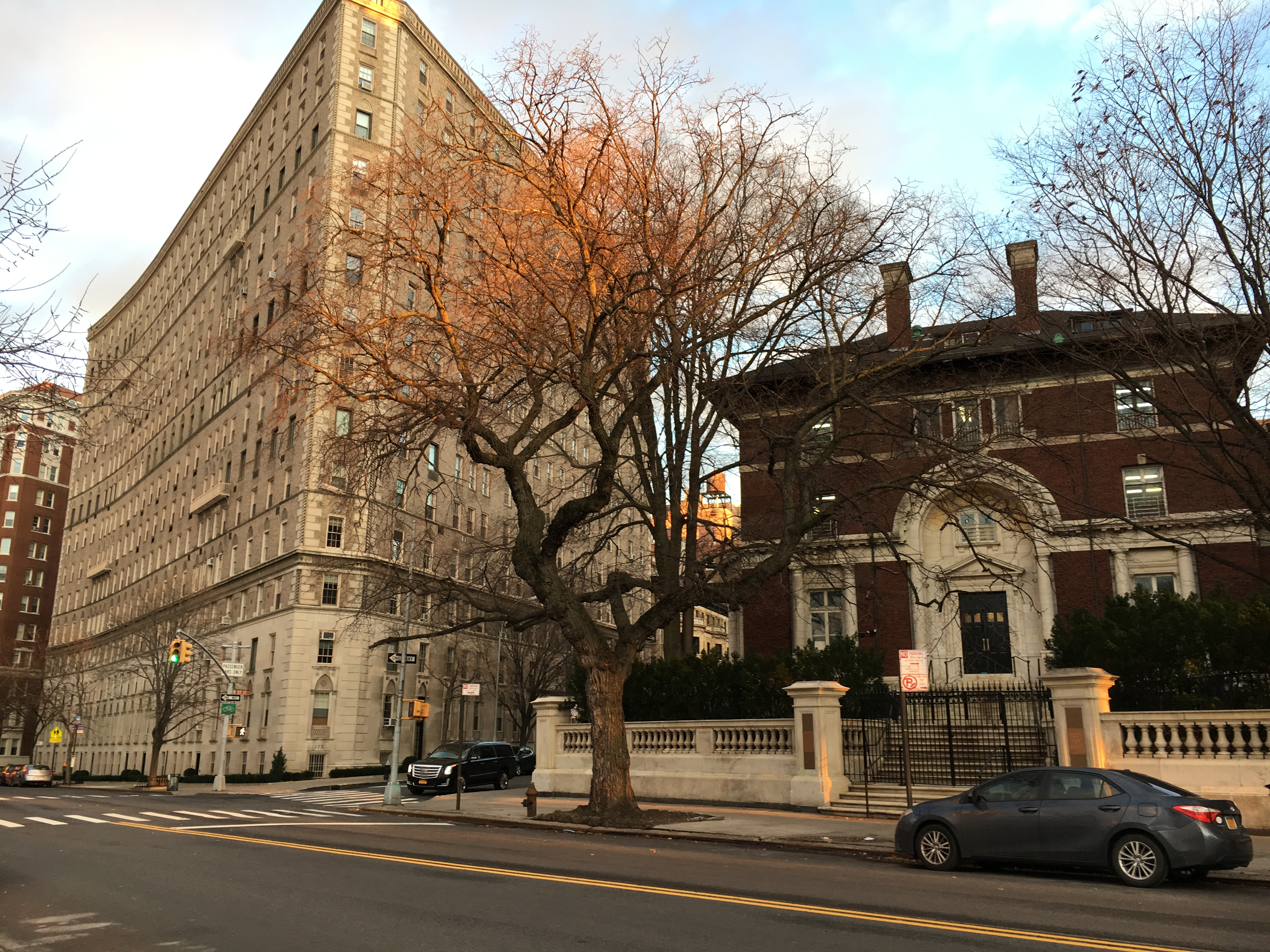
The mansion as seen from the southwest

Herts and Tallant submitted blueprints for a four-to-five-story brick-and-stone mansion to the New York City Department of Buildings in August 1900. The original plans called for the mansion to occupy the center of its site. There were to be features such as a garage, gymnasium, chess room, grand stair, observatory tower, billiard room, and private clinic. The Building & Sanitary Inspection Company was given the contract for the plumbing and ventilation. Herts & Tallant submitted updated plans for the mansion in August 1901. The house was relocated eastward so its main facade would be on Riverside Drive; this allowed the house's architecture to complement the adjoining row houses on 89th Street. The structure had been built up to the third story by January 1902.

The house was nearly complete by the end of 1902; its final cost was estimated at $750,000 (equivalent to $27,909,000 in 2025), excluding furniture. With the city government's permission, the Rice family built a perimeter fence, which protruded several feet onto the sidewalks of Riverside Drive and 89th Street. The house was finished in 1903, being referred to as "Villa Julia" in honor of Rice's wife. Chess matches were sometimes hosted at the house, such as college tournaments and at least one international collegiate match conducted by cablegram.

Isaac Rice rehired Herts & Tallant in 1906 to design a one-story annex at a cost of $25,000 (equivalent to $896,000 in 2025). By the mid-1900s, Julia Rice was annoyed at the frequent noise made by the tugboats on the Hudson River near the house, saying that the commotion made it impossible to sleep. After a student counted almost 3,000 horn blasts near the house in a single night, Julia established the Society for the Suppression of Unnecessary Noise at the house in early 1907. Tugboat operators protested outside her house, but the effort ultimately led to federal legislation limiting noise from tugboats. The city government sought to have the mansion's perimeter wall removed by mid-1906, after government officials received complaints from several neighbors. Though Rice argued that other Riverside Drive residences had taller fences, he was ordered to demolish his perimeter wall in January 1907; litigation over the wall continued for months.

==== Schinasi ownership ====
In 1907, the Rice family decided to move to the Ansonia Hotel. Various reasons are given for the relocation, including the financial crisis that year, the fact that the Rices spent much of their time elsewhere, and Julia Rice's fight against tugboat noise. Julia also cited noise from the New York Central Railroad's West Side Line as a reason for her decision to move to the Ansonia. The tobacconist Solomon Schinasi, whose brother Morris was developing the Schinasi Mansion further north, bought the Rice Mansion in December 1907 for $600,000 (equivalent to $20,732,000 in 2025). He paid in cash for the home and also took over the house's $175,000 mortgage (equivalent to $6,047,000 in 2025). Schinasi had reportedly not even considered buying the Rice Mansion until shortly before his purchase was finalized. A judge ruled the same month that the mansion's perimeter wall had to be removed.

In April 1908, C. P. H. Gilbert submitted plans to the New York City Department of Buildings for the construction of a three-story extension, which was to cost $38,000 (equivalent to $1,362,000 in 2025). The work involved removing the main stairway and elevator to make way for a new entrance. The W. L. Crow Construction Company was hired as the general contractor for the annex's construction, while D. S. Hess & Co. was given the contract for the interior decorations. Meanwhile, the city's park commissioner initially refrained from demolishing the Rice Mansion's perimeter wall, as he was awaiting the outcome of another lawsuit involving the removal of sidewalk obstructions. The second lawsuit was decided in the park commissioner's favor in June 1911, and the wall was demolished shortly thereafter. Schinasi hired Gilbert in 1912 to design a new perimeter wall, and Bunn and Nase were hired to build the wall. Solomon, his son Leon, and his adoptive daughter Nellie Schrater Stoeve lived in the house; Nellie described herself as being "as much a domestic slave of the Schinasi family as though I had really been a prisoner" there.

Solomon Schinasi lived in the house until 1919, when he died there of heart disease. Leon and Nellie continued to live there. Leon married Ruby Smith Salmon in 1926, and Ruby is recorded as having moved to the house,. evicting Nellie. The next year, Leon developed a garage on 89th Street and modified the southern facade of the house. Leon died in 1930, bequeathing the house and the objects inside to Ruby, who continued to live there with their two children. By 1935, the general costs of the mansion amounted to $35,000 annually (equivalent to $822,000 in 2025). In 1940, a New York Surrogate's Court judge authorized Ruby to spend $2,000 (equivalent to $46,000 in 2025) to redecorate her daughter's bedroom inside the house.

The Schinasi family continued to live in the house until around 1945, and it leased the house out during the mid-20th century. The Heckscher Foundation for Children leased the house in the mid-1940s. A New York Times article from 1946 described the house as hosting rehearsals twice a week, in addition to dance rehearsals and "other forms of welfare work".

=== Use as yeshiva ===
==== Yeshiva Chofetz Chaim ownership ====
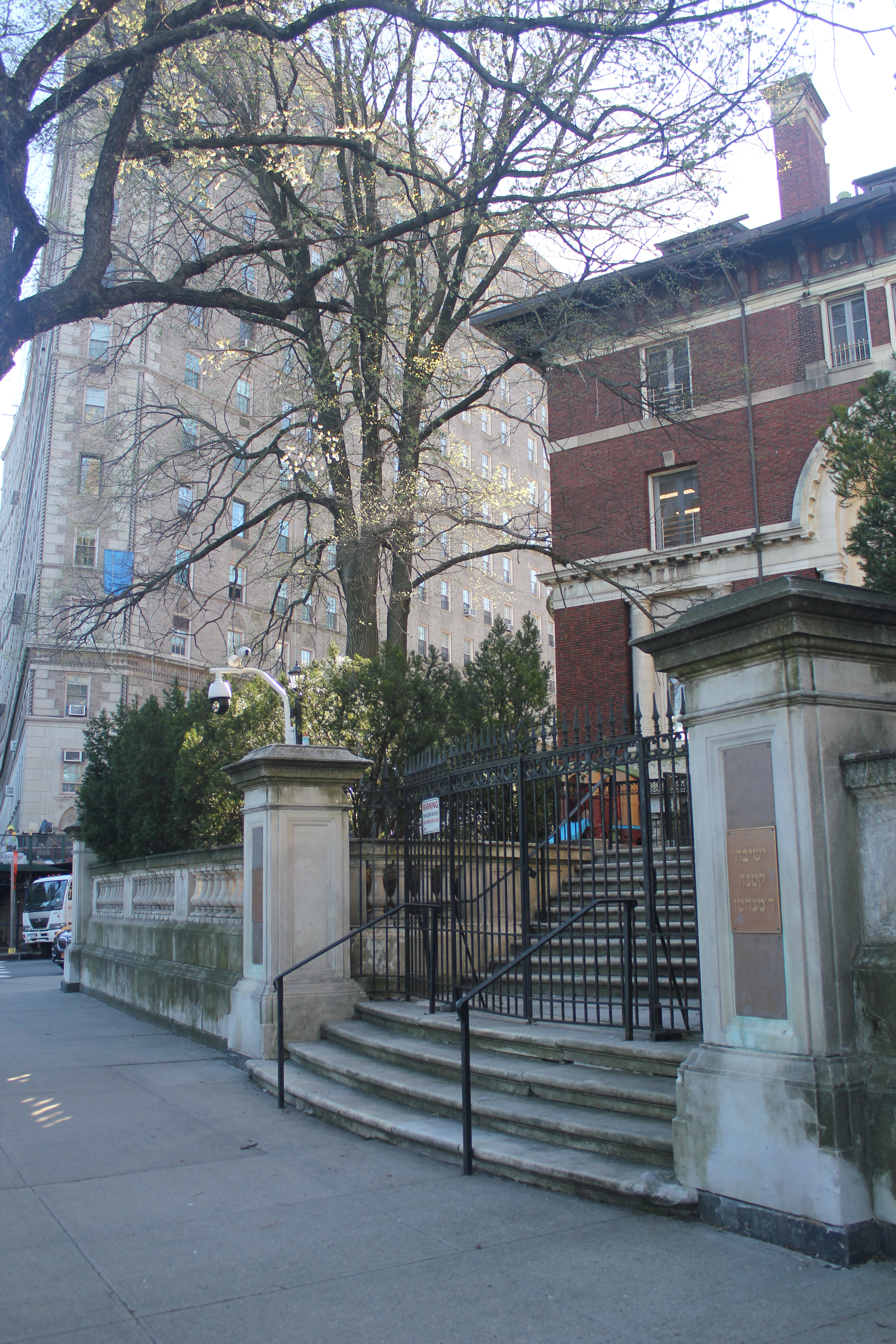
Stairs from Riverside Drive

Yeshiva Chofetz Chaim, a yeshiva for Orthodox Jewish students, acquired the house in June 1954 at an assessed price of $300,000 (equivalent to $3,597,000 in 2025). The yeshiva had originally been the Radin Yeshiva, which had relocated from Poland after World War II. Chofetz Chaim had moved into the house by the end of the year, using the mansion as a school while retaining the house's original decorations. The yeshiva opened a high school in Tallman, New York, in 1964 but kept ownership of the house at 346 West 89th Street. The New York City Landmarks Preservation Commission (LPC) considered designating the house as a landmark in 1973 but ultimately declined to do so.

In 1979, Yeshiva Chofetz Chaim indicated that it wanted to sell the Rice Mansion because it was too small for the school and too expensive to maintain. The yeshiva's dean, Emerich Feigelstock, said the school needed money and that a developer might offer $1.5 million to $2.5 million. The developer, rumored to be a Canadian firm, would have replaced the mansion with a high-rise tower with up to 40 apartments, as well as classrooms for the yeshiva. Local residents formed the Citizens' Coalition to Preserve the Isaac L. Rice Mansion. The group and the yeshiva could not agree on a potential buyer for the mansion or an alternate location for the school. Feigelstock said in September 1979 that he had identified a developer who was willing to pay $2 million, whereas a buyer selected by Citizens' Coalition wanted to pay only $250,000. The LPC held a hearing on the mansion that month, amid continuing disputes over the mansion. Feigelstock maintained that the building had no historical or architectural importance because Rice was unknown to him. The LPC designated the Rice Mansion as a landmark in February 1980.

The LPC's designation had to be approved by the New York City Board of Estimate, and Jewish groups and local residents continued to debate it acrimoniously. One New York Times article that the discussions were marked by "suggestions of anti-Semitism and allusions to connections with figures in nursing-home scandals". Opponents of the designation believed that a decision over the building's preservation was outside the LPC's purview, while supporters did not want the house to be demolished. New York Times architectural critic Paul Goldberger said the residents' reasons for saving the mansion were inherently selfish in nature. By a margin of one vote, the Board of Estimate confirmed the house's landmark designation in June 1980. The building was also placed on the New York State Register of Historic Places and the National Register of Historic Places, and the offer to buy the mansion was withdrawn. The LPC designation meant that, if the yeshiva had difficulties financing the building's maintenance, the city had to find a new owner for the mansion, making it more difficult to demolish the mansion legally. In 1987, the LPC proposed adding the house to the planned Riverside-West End Historic District, which was designated as a city historic district three years later.

==== Yeshiva Ketana ownership ====
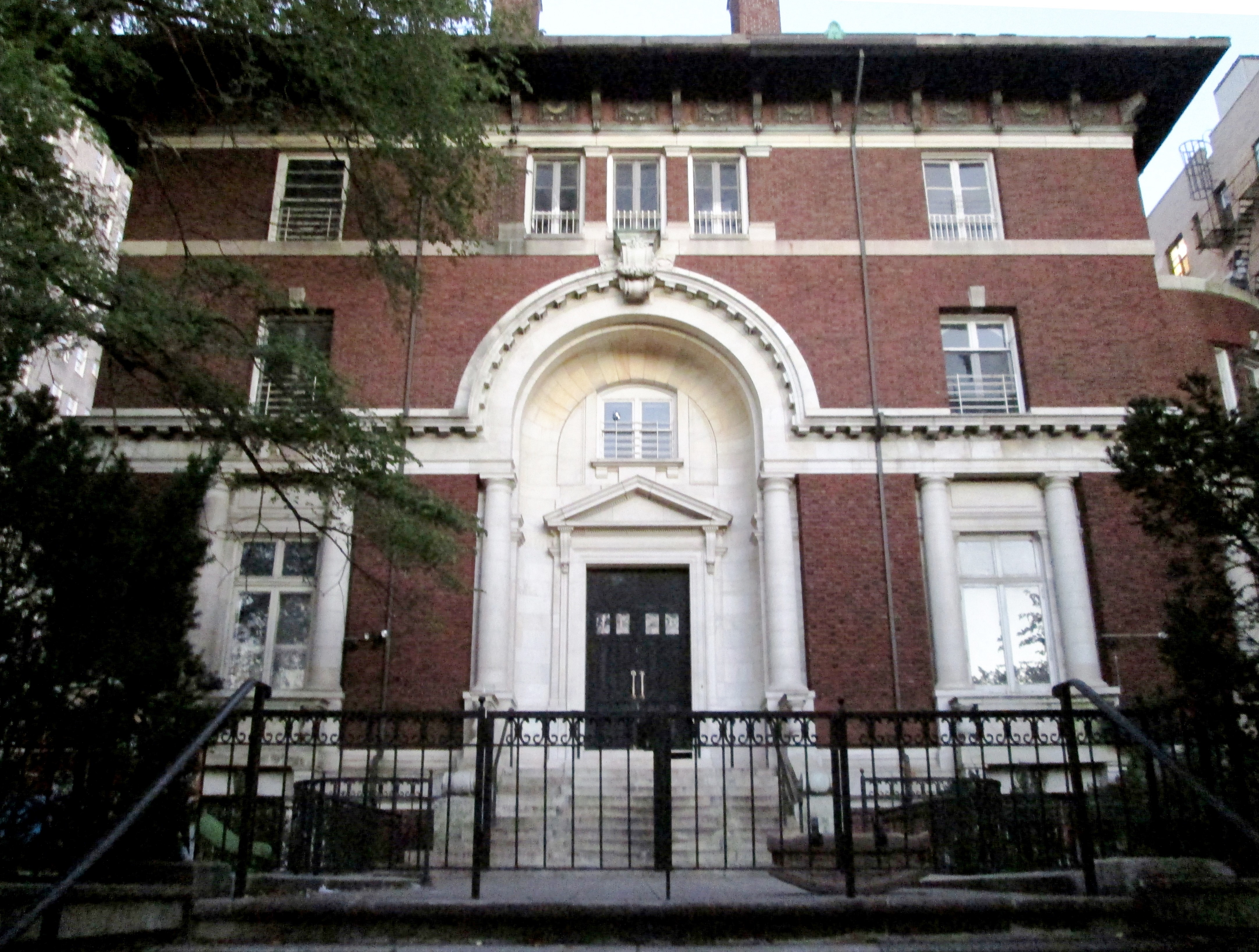
Riverside Drive entrance

The house was taken over in 1988 by another Jewish day school, Yeshiva Ketana, which had 200 students. Yeshiva Ketana was one of several Orthodox Jewish day schools in the neighborhood. The yeshiva began raising money for repairs to the Rice Mansion, including a $250,000 renovation of the roof, which was partly funded by a private grant. The school had difficulty raising money for other repairs, including the construction of a second staircase to four rooms on the roof, so it requested assistance from the local preservation group Landmark West. Yeshiva Ketana replaced the mansion's roof in the late 1990s. The roof caught fire in December 1997, shortly after its renovation was completed; though the upper stories were severely damaged, the roof repairs were delayed until the end of the school year. Because the house was a designated city landmark, the New York Landmarks Conservancy and other local groups provided funding to restore the damaged roof.

In 1999, Yeshiva Ketana proposed converting the house's dust-filled yard into a playground, but local residents opposed the plan. By the early 21st century, local residents accused Yeshiva Ketana of not adequately maintaining the house and complained to both the LPC and the New York City Department of Buildings, the latter of which fined the yeshiva. The house was still known as the Rice Mansion or the Rice House. The New York Times described the house in 2005 as dilapidated, with cracks in the masonry; damaged or missing copper decorations; and a yard filled with dust that blew into nearby houses. Yeshiva Ketana continued to occupy the building in the 2020s.

== Reception ==
Upon the house's completion, the Democrat and Chronicle called the house "one of the finest houses in New York, both in its exterior aspect and its interior arrangement". Before the building was designated as a landmark in 1980, a writer for the SoHo News wrote that the house's Riverside Drive facade augmented the avenue because it faced the Soldiers' and Sailors' Monument, while the 89th Street elevation inspired the design of the adjacent row houses.

When the building was designated as a landmark, Paul Goldberger wrote that the Rice Mansion was "a handsome freestanding mansion, mixing the beaux arts and neo-Georgian styles in the eclectic manner", in a manner akin to the Andrew Carnegie Mansion on the Upper East Side. Goldberger also wrote that the house was "at once grand and pleasantly eccentric", especially considering the design of its porte-cochere. Christopher Gray, another architectural historian, said the house was "superior to many" existing city-designated landmarks.

== See also ==
- List of New York City Designated Landmarks in Manhattan from 59th to 110th Streets
- National Register of Historic Places listings in Manhattan from 59th to 110th Streets
