= Hari Balakrishnan =

Indian computer scientist

- Born: November 1971 (age 54–55)
- Education: Indian Institute of Technology Madras; University of California, Berkeley
- Known for: CarTel mobile sensor system Cricket indoor location system Chord; Resilient Overlay Networks; Cambridge Mobile Telematics; StreamBase
- Awards: Marconi Prize (2023), SIGCOMM Award (20221, IEEE Koji Kobayashi Computers and Communications Award (2021), Infosys Prize (2020)
- Scientific career
- Fields: Networks, Wireless Networks, Mobile Computing
- Workplaces: Massachusetts Institute of Technology
- Thesis: Challenges to Reliable Data Transport over Heterogeneous Wireless Networks (1998)
- Doctoral advisor: Randy Katz
- Notable students: Magdalena Balazinska, Keith Winstein, Wendi Heinzelman, Alex Snoeren
- Website: nms.csail.mit.edu/~hari/

Hari Balakrishnan is the Fujitsu Professor of Computer Science and Artificial Intelligence in the Department of Electrical Engineering and Computer Science at MIT, and the Co-founder and CTO at Cambridge Mobile Telematics.

== Early life and career ==
Balakrishnan was born in Nagpur, India, and was raised in Bombay (Mumbai) and Chennai. He received his bachelor's degree in computer science from the Indian Institute of Technology, Madras in 1993 and his doctoral degree in computer science from the University of California, Berkeley in 1998. He has been at MIT since 1998, and leads the Networks and Mobile Systems group at MIT's Computer Science and Artificial Intelligence Laboratory. His father, V. Balakrishnan, is a renowned physics educator and researcher in theoretical physics, his mother, Radha Balakrishnan, is also a well-known theoretical physicist, and his sister, Hamsa Balakrishnan, is a Professor and Associate Department Head of MIT's Department of Aeronautics and Astronautics.

Balakrishnan co-invented the Chord distributed hash table, the RON resilient overlay network (with David Andersen), and the rcc tool for verifiable Internet routing (with Nick Feamster).

The CarTel project (2005-2010) of Hari Balakrishnan and Sam Madden introduced the idea of using sensors attached to mobile assets such as vehicles and user's phones to measure the environment, helping to create the field of mobile sensing. Results from the CarTel project include the Pothole Patrol (with Jakob Eriksson and others), which used the opportunistic mobility of sensor-equipped vehicles to detect the surface conditions of roads, and the VTrack and CTrack algorithms for accurate path and delay inference from noisy position streams.

His work on wireless networks includes the TCP Migrate protocol (with Alex Snoeren) for seamless TCP connection migration across IP addresses. His work on spinal codes with Jonathan Perry and Devavrat Shah developed the first rateless codes to nearly achieve Shannon capacity over both Gaussian and binary-symmetric channels with an efficient encoder and decoder, thereby providing a new way to combat time-varying wireless channels.

Balakrishnan's work on Internet security includes the Infranet anti-censorship system, distributed quota enforcement for spam control, the Accountable Internet Protocol (AIP), and guarding against application-level distributed denial-of-service attacks using proof of "network work". His work on router design includes the development of switch scheduling and QoS algorithms for Sandburst's (acquired by Broadcom) switch in the early 2000s, and his research on programmable high-speed routers (Domino and PIFO) with Anirudh Sivaraman, Mohammad Alizadeh, and others, which have influenced the P4 forwarding language. His work on naming systems includes an early empirical study of DNS performance and caching effectiveness and the proposal for a layered naming architecture for the Internet using flat names resolvable using a scalable distributed hash table at the lowest layer.

In 2010, Balakrishnan founded Cambridge Mobile Telematics with Bill Powers and Sam Madden, and serves as the Chairman of its board. In December 2018, the SoftBank Vision Fund invested $500 million in Cambridge Mobile Telematics.

== Awards and honors ==
- 1998: His PhD thesis on reliable data transport over wireless networks won the ACM doctoral dissertation award for best thesis in computer science.
- 2002: He was elected as a Fellow of the Sloan Foundation.
- 2003: He received MIT's prestigious Harold E. Edgerton prize for research and teaching excellence.
- 2008: He was elected a fellow of the Association for Computing Machinery (ACM) in 2008.
- 2013: He received the Distinguished Alumnus Award from the Indian Institute of Technology, Madras.
- 2015: He was elected to the US National Academy of Engineering for contributions to networks and distributed systems.
- 2017: He was elected to the American Academy of Arts and Sciences.
- 2020: He was elected as a Fellow of the IEEE for contributions to the design and application of mobile sensing.
- 2020: He received the Infosys Prize for Engineering and Computer Science, the most prestigious award that recognizes achievements in science and research in India, for his broad contributions to computer networking, his seminal work on mobile and wireless systems, and for commercial use of mobile telematics to improve driver behavior and make roads safer around the world.
- 2021: He received the IEEE Koji Kobayashi Computers and Communications Award for broad contributions to computer networking and mobile and wireless systems.
- 2021: He received the Distinguished Alumnus Award in Computer Science from the EECS Department of the University of California at Berkeley.
- 2023. He received the Marconi Prize awarded by the Marconi Society, which MIT News describes as being "widely considered to be the top honor within the field of communications technology"
