= Julia Barnett Rice =

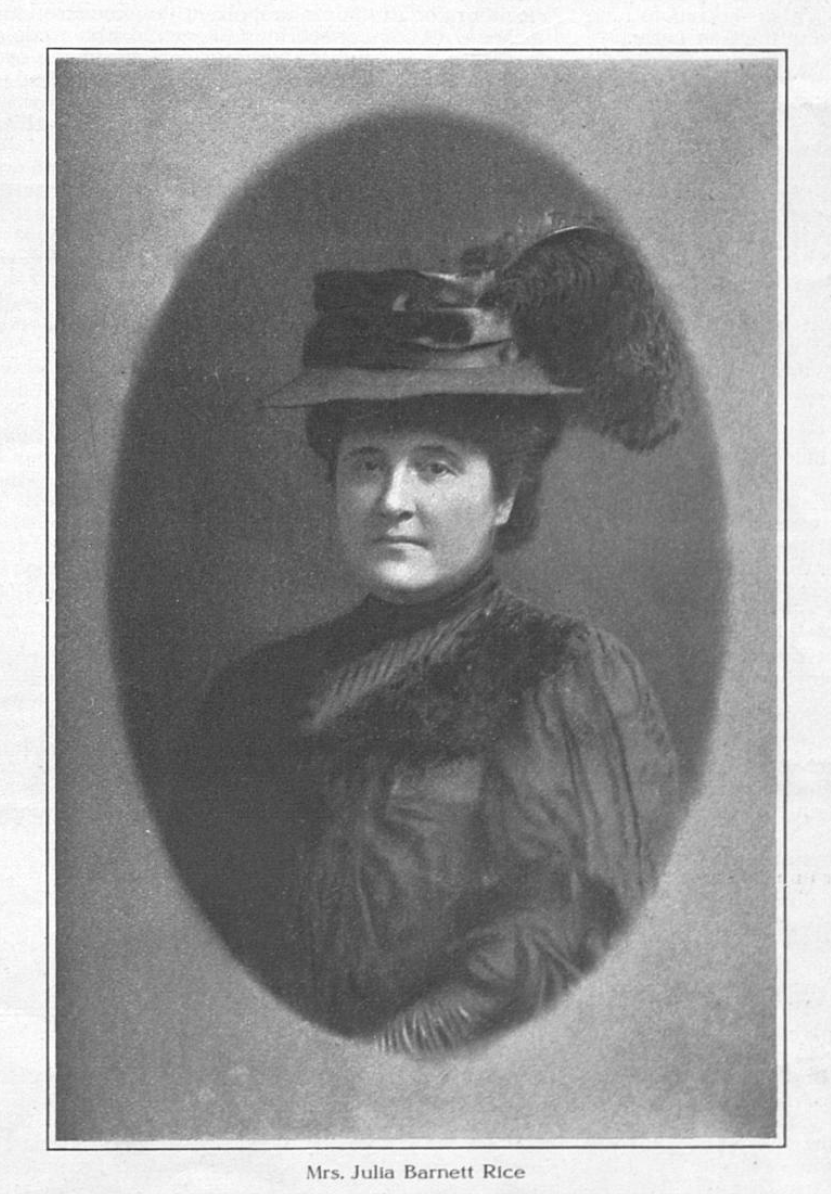

Julia Barnett Rice (May 2, 1860 – November 4, 1929) was an activist against unnecessary noise, and was the founder of The Society for the Suppression of Unnecessary Noise. Her involvement and efforts helped pass the 1907 Bennett Act, which regulated the unnecessary noise and whistling of tugboats. Her efforts improved the lives of students and hospital patients in New York City and influenced activists across the country.

== Life ==
Julia Barnett Rice was born May 2, 1860, in New Orleans, Louisiana. She died on November 4, 1929.

== Family ==
Julia was the wife of Isaac Rice, a successful businessman, whom she married on December 12, 1885. Julia was also the mother of six children Dorothy, Isaac, Marion, Marjorie, and Julian. Although she was born in New Orleans, her and her family ended up living on the Upper West Side of Manhattan at the Isaac L. Rice Mansion on Riverside Drive.

== Education ==
Julia obtained and held a medical degree from the Women’s Medical College of the New York Infirmary, but never practiced medicine. She was also well educated in music, as was her husband.

== Career ==
Julia was the intellectual partner to her husband - Isaac Rice - as well as an accomplished musician.

== Society for the Suppression of Unnecessary Noise ==
Influential members were recruited, such as the “Surveyor of the Port of New York, the President of Columbia University, the Chancellor of the University of New York, a Congressman, the Commissioner of Health,” and many more.

An employee at Bellevue Hospital discussed the impact that the tugboat horns had on his patients, and how “Patients imagine demons are after them. In many cases, the shock is proved to be fatal.” This statement got Julia’s campaign going, and influenced a few other hospitals in earshot of the tugboat noises to speak up as well.

After gaining a fair amount of notice, Julia Barnett Rice recruited a number of Columbia University Students to listen, record, and account for the frequent, unbearable noise that was heard in her house. The students accounted how many tugboat whistles occurred and of those how many were unnecessary, leisure whistles between different tugboats. The students found that there were approximately 5,000 unnecessary tugboat horn noises each night. The tugboat captains were not happy with Julia’s efforts to stop their whistling, and quite a bit of controversy occurred because of it. Julia’s efforts eventually gained order that tugboats should not make unnecessary whistling, and when a specific tugboat did, Julia pressed charges and the captain ended up getting a suspension.

Finally, Julia’s efforts ended up aiding the process of passing the 1907 Bennett Act, or the “Bennett Bill.” Representative William M. Bennett of New York authorized this Bill and made it so that “Inspectors of Steamboats could regulate the whistling of Steamboats” as they wished, as long as it was under “their area of jurisdiction.” This bill ended with a victory for Julia and her war on the unnecessary noise of tugboats.

Julia was the president of the Society for the Suppression of Unnecessary Noise, and it went on to be quite successful- the New York City Board of Education even gave Julia permission to create a children’s branch of her Society. This branch included prevention of the unnecessary noise of children playing near hospitals and medical centers, and provided a reward to all children that followed. Julia’s works and efforts with this society went on to prevent unnecessary noise of all sorts- not just tugboats- and was viewed as a serious, respected Society.
