= Lawrence Sperry =

American inventor of the autopilot (1892–1923)

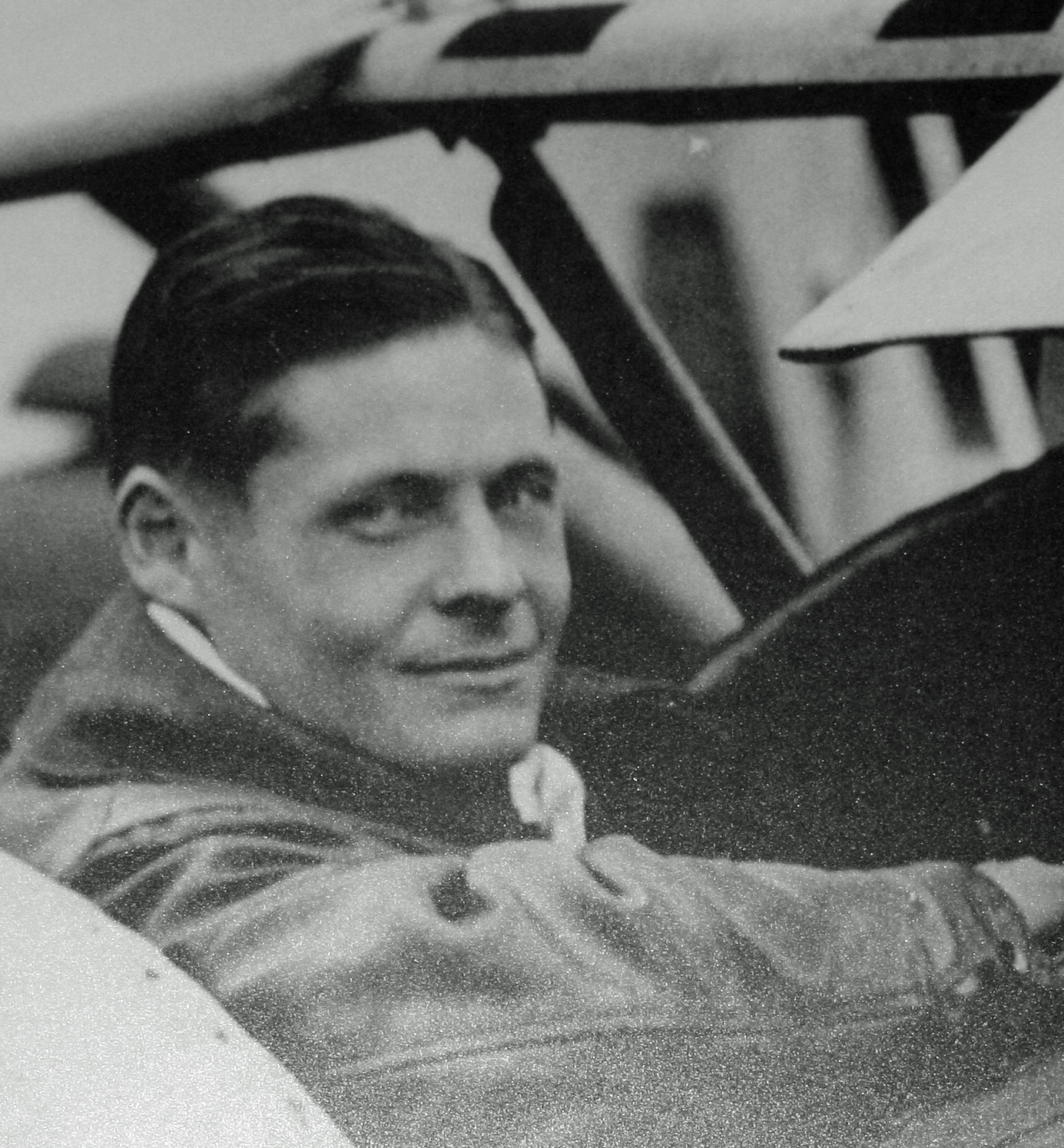
- Born: 21 December 1892; Chicago, Illinois, US
- Died: 13 December 1923 (aged 30); English Channel
- Known for: invention of the first autopilot and artificial horizon
- Spouse: Winifred Allen

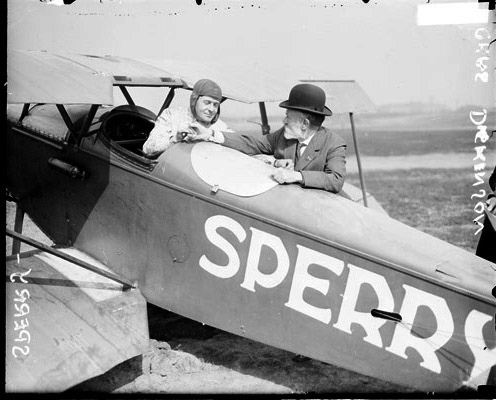

Lawrence Burst Sperry (21 December 1892, Chicago, Illinois, United States – December 13, 1923, English Channel) was an aviation pioneer who invented the autopilot and the artificial horizon.

== Biography ==
Sperry was the third son of the gyrocompass co-inventor, Elmer Ambrose Sperry, and his wife Zula. Sperry invented the first autopilot, which he demonstrated with startling success in France in 1914. Sperry is also credited with developing the artificial horizon still used on most aircraft in the early 21st century.

In 1918, he married film actress Winifred Allen, and Flying Magazine reported that they were "the first couple to take an aerial honeymoon" after they flew from Amityville to Governors Island.

On 13 December 1923, Sperry took off amid fog in a Verville-Sperry M-1 Messenger from the United Kingdom headed for France but never reached his destination. His body was found in the English Channel on 11 January 1924.

== Legacy ==
A website using the name Mile High Club regards Sperry as the "Club's" "founder", along with "socialite Mrs. Waldo Peirce" (Dorothy Rice Sims) citing their flight in an autopilot-equipped Curtiss Flying Boat near New York in November 1916.

Why, Mrs Peirce and I didn't have what you might dignify by calling a real accident. It was only a trivial mishap. We decided to land on the water and came down perfectly from a height of 600 feet and would have made a perfect landing had not the hull of our machine struck one of the stakes that dot the water, which staved a hole in it.

In 1979, Sperry was inducted into the International Air & Space Hall of Fame at the San Diego Air & Space Museum.

Sperry was inducted into the Naval Aviation Hall of Honor at the National Naval Aviation Museum in Pensacola, Florida, in 1992.

== Sperry Award winners ==
The Lawrence Sperry Award is presented by the AIAA for a notable contribution made by a young person, age 35 or under, to the advancement of aeronautics or astronautics.

- 1936 William C. Rockefeller
- 1937 Kelly Johnson (engineer)
- 1938 Russell C. Newhouse
- 1939 Charles M Kearns Jr.
- 1941 Ernest G. Stout
- 1942 Edward C. Wells
- 1967 Gene Kranz
- 1970 Glynn Lunney
- 1984 Sally Ride
- 1985 William P. Lear
- 1986 Parviz Moin
- 1987 James L. Thomas
- 1988 David W. Thompson
- 1989 Cas P. Van Dam
- 1990 Ilan M. Kroo
- 1991 Mark Drela
- 1992 John T. Batina
- 1993 Tim Barth
- 1994 William K. Anderson
- 1995 William P Schonberg
- 1996 Penina Axelrad
- 1997 John Kallinderis
- 1998 Iain D. Boyd
- 1999 Robert D. Braun
- 2000 Anna-Maria R. McGowan
- 2001 Keith A Comeaux
- 2002 Edward C. Smith
- 2003 Myles L. Baker
- 2004 Jeffrey D. Jordan
- 2005 Tim C. Lieuwen
- 2006 Lynn Nicole Smith
- 2007 Amy Pritchett
- 2008 Ryan P. Starkey
- 2009 Adam Rasheed
- 2010 Mitchell L. Walker II
- 2011 M. Brett McMickell
- 2012 Hamsa Balakrishnan
- 2013 Eric J. Ruggiero
- 2014 Kimberley C. Clayfield
- 2015 Jeremy T. Pinier
- 2016 Joshua Rovey
- 2017 Karen T. Berger
- 2018 Michael D. West
- 2019 Katya M. Casper
- 2020 Patrick R. C. Neumann
- 2021 Benjamin Jorns
- 2022 Michael P. Snyder

== See also ==
- Sperry Corporation
