= V. Balakrishnan (physicist) =

Indian theoretical physicist

Venkataraman Balakrishnan
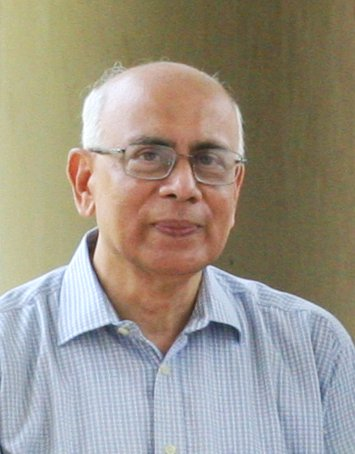
- Born: 1943 (age 82–83); India
- Education: St Stephen's College, Delhi; Delhi University; Brandeis University
- Known for: Researcher of Statistical Physics
- Spouse: Radha Balakrishnan
- Children: Hari Balakrishnan, Hamsa Balakrishnan
- Scientific career
- Fields: Particle physics, many-body theory, dynamical systems, stochastic processes, quantum dynamics, mechanical behavior of solids, and others
- Workplaces: TIFR; IIT Madras

V. Balakrishnan (born 1943 as Venkataraman Balakrishnan) is an Indian theoretical physicist, who has worked in a number of fields and areas, including particle physics, many-body theory, the mechanical behavior of solids, dynamical systems, stochastic processes, and quantum dynamics. He is an accomplished researcher who has made important contributions to the theory of anelasticity, continuous-time random walks, and recurrences in dynamical systems.

== Education and career ==
He received his undergraduate degree from St. Stephen’s College, Delhi and PhD from Brandeis University in 1970. After a decade at TIFR and IGCAR Kalpakkam, he joined IIT Madras as a Professor of Physics in 1980. He was elected a Fellow of the Indian Academy of Sciences in 1985.

In addition to his research, Balakrishnan is a teacher of physics, known for his engaging teaching style. He has taught a wide range of courses over the past 30 years from introductory physics to quantum field theory to dynamical systems. Two of his courses (38 lectures in Classical Physics and 31 in Quantum Physics) taught at IIT Madras through National Programme on Technology Enhanced Learning are available on NPTEL's channel on YouTube, and have received more than 6 million views in all (as of May 2025).

- 38 lectures in Classical Physics
- 31 lectures in Quantum Physics
- A third series appeared in June 2014 titled Selected Topics in Mathematical Physics.
- Towards the end of July 2014, NPTEL released a fourth series of lectures titled Topics in Nonlinear Dynamics.
- A fifth series entitled Basic Concepts of Elementary Physics : Mechanics, Heat, Oscillations, Waves and Thermal Physics was released in the beginning of May 2015.
- A sixth series of lectures appeared towards the end of November 2015 titled Physical Applications of Stochastic Processes.
- A seventh series entitled Non-equilibrium Statistical Mechanics was released in June 2016.

Apart from his teaching, Balakrishnan has contributed a number of book reviews and general science articles to the Resonance Journal of Science Education.

== Publications ==
Balakrishnan has authored the book Mathematical Physics with Applications, Problems and Solutions (Ane Books 2017, Springer 2020). He has also authored the book Elements of Nonequilibrium Statistical Mechanics (CRC Press 2008). A review in the journal Soft Materials explained that rather than providing comprehensive coverage of the field of nonequilibrium statistical mechanics, the book focuses on explaining the Langevin and Fokker–Planck equations. He co-authored the book Beyond the Crystalline State: An Emerging Perspective (Springer 1989).

== Family ==
His wife, Radha Balakrishnan, is a theoretical physicist who works on nonlinear dynamics (in particular, solitons and integrable systems). His son, Hari Balakrishnan, is currently the Fujitsu Professor of Computer Science at MIT. His daughter, Hamsa Balakrishnan, is also on the faculty at MIT as a Professor of Aeronautics and Astronautics.
