= 89th Street (Manhattan) =

West-east street in Manhattan, New York

- Fred Lebow Place
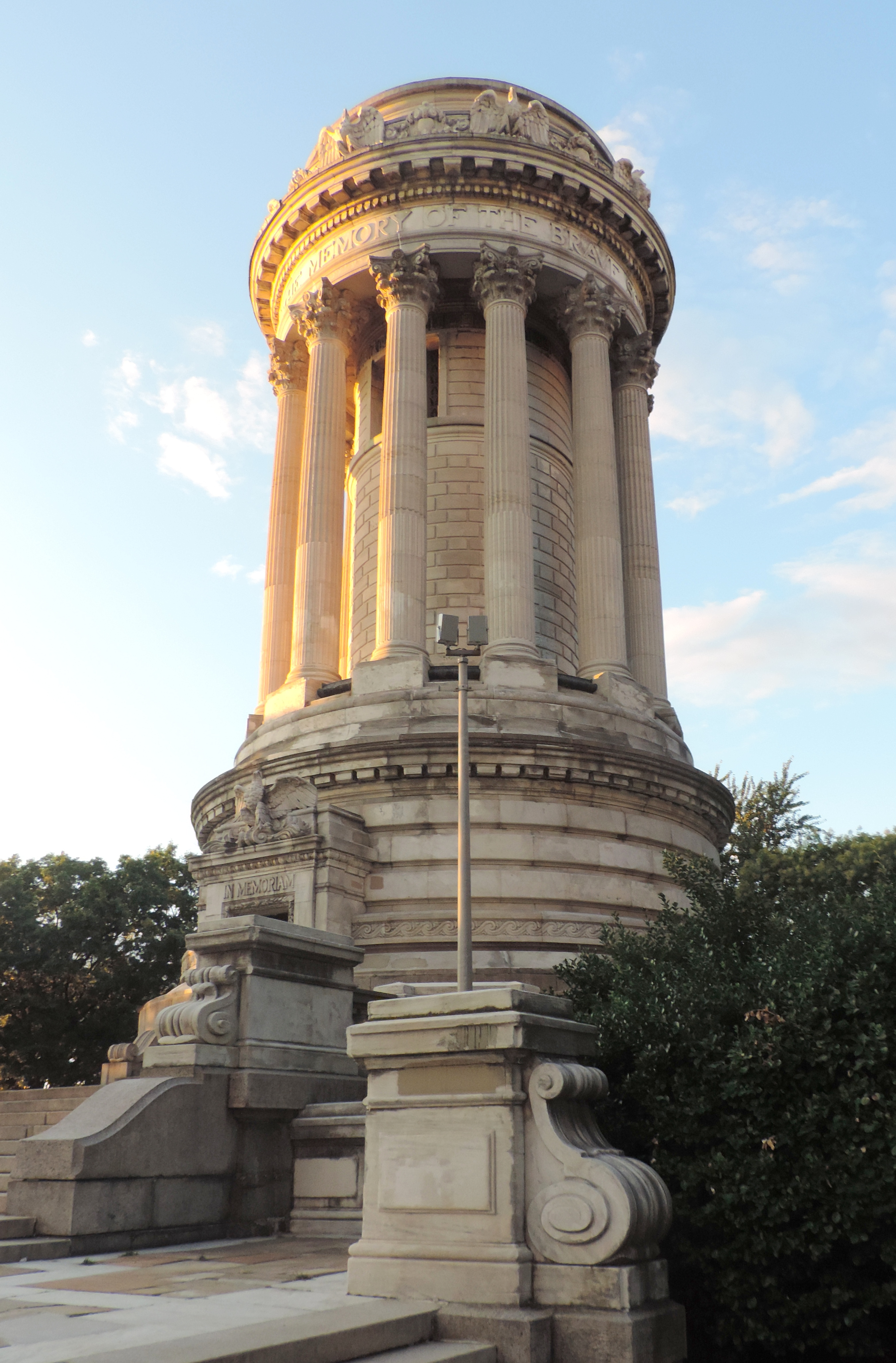
- The Soldier's and Sailor's Monument at West 89th Street and Riverside Drive
- Maintained by: NYCDOT
- Length: 1.5 mi (2.4 km)
- Width: 60 feet (18.29 m)
- Location: Manhattan
- Postal code: 10024 (west), 10128 (east)
- Coordinates: 40.7833°N 73.9586°W
- West end: Riverside Drive in Upper West Side
- East end: East End Avenue in Yorkville
- North: 90th Street
- South: 88th Street

Construction
- Commissioned: 1811

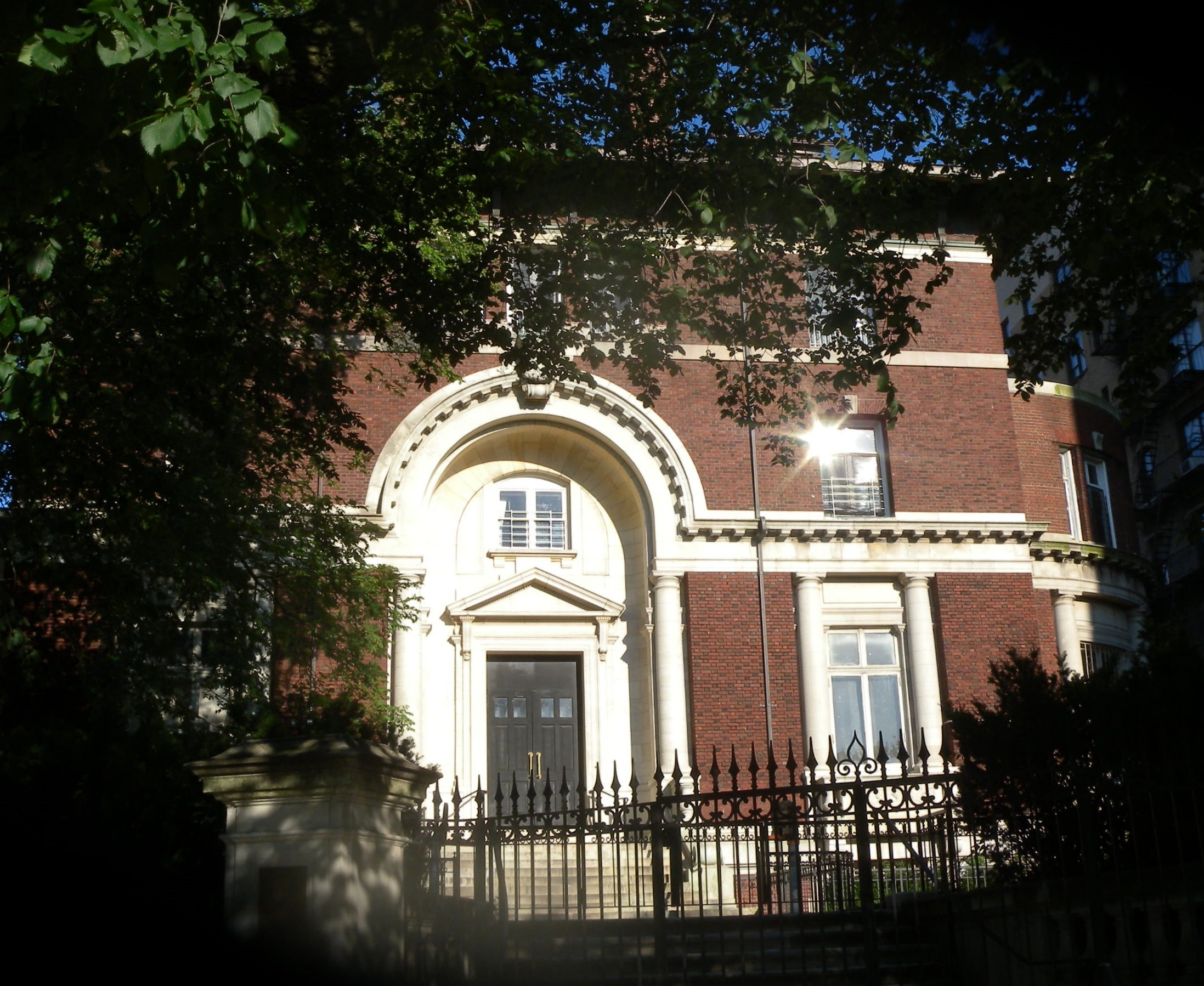
Isaac Rice Mansion, now Yeshiva Ketana

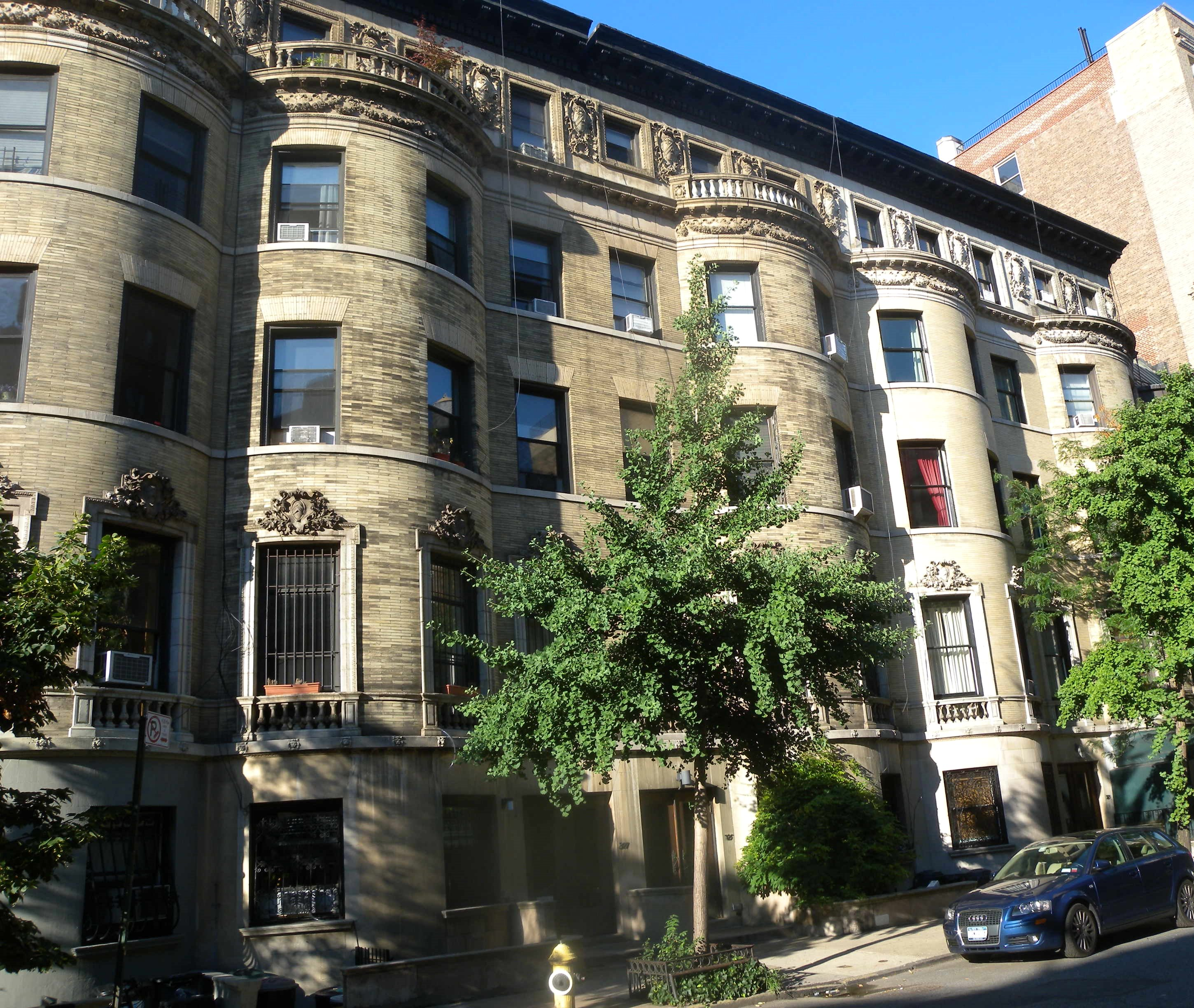
Houses on West 89th St

89th Street is a one-way street running westbound from the East River to Riverside Drive, overlooking the Hudson River, in the New York City borough of Manhattan. The street is interrupted by Central Park. It runs through the Upper West Side, Carnegie Hill and Yorkville neighborhoods.

The street's western terminal is on Riverside Drive overlooking Riverside Park and the Hudson River at the site of the Classical marble Soldiers' and Sailors' Monument.

The first building on the north side of the street at its western end is 173-175 Riverside Drive, a co-operative apartment building with entrances on both 89th and 90th Streets. On the south side of the street stands the former Isaac Rice Mansion, now Yeshiva Ketana of Manhattan and a designated New York City Landmark.

The Dalton School, the Dwight School, and the Abraham Joshua Heschel School are all located on 89th Street.

The block between Amsterdam Avenue and Columbus Avenue has the old Claremont Riding Academy, now an extension of the Gaynor School, the West Side Community Garden and the restored 1890s Public School 166, a much admired Collegiate Gothic building in glazed terra cotta.

The block between Columbus Avenue and Central Park West is tree-shaded and lined with beautiful restored town houses. The corner of Central Park West is marked by The St. Urban, an apartment building "splendidly crowned by dome and cupola".

To the east of Central Park, the street passes the 89th street facade of the National Academy of Design in a block of handsome town houses. Between Madison Avenue and Park Avenue is a handsome gothic Revival church, built by the Episcopalians in 1870, it became a Reformed Church and is now the Roman Catholic Church of St. Thomas More. The block between Lexington Avenue and Third Avenue has a row of "spectacularly romantic" Queen Anne style town houses.

East 89th Street is cosigned as Fred Lebow Place between Fifth and Madison Avenues, honoring the founder of the New York City Marathon. This block also contains the offices of the New York Road Runners.

The street ends at Carl Schurz Park on the East River.
