= Magdalena Bałazińska =

Computer scientist

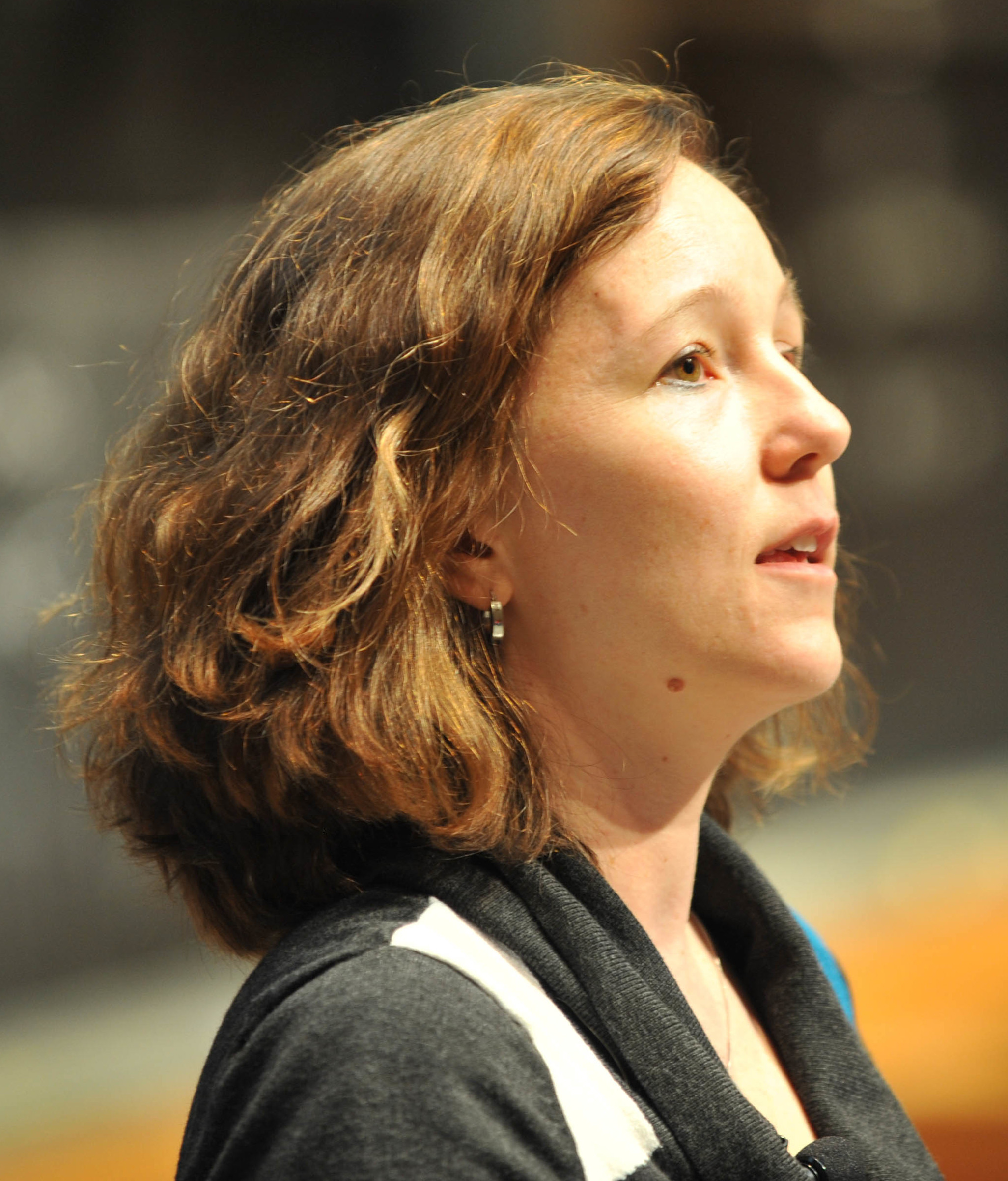
Bałazińska in 2014

Magdalena Bałazińska is a computer scientist whose research concerns databases and data streams. Born in Poland and educated in Algeria, Canada, and the US, she works at the University of Washington, where she directed the Paul G. Allen School of Computer Science & Engineering from 2019 to 2026.

== Education and career ==
Balazinska was born in Poland. Her family moved to Algeria, where she studied in a Polish and French speaking school, and then to Quebec, Canada, where she did her university studies in computer engineering at the Polytechnique Montréal. She completed her Ph.D. in computer science in 2005 at the Massachusetts Institute of Technology. Her dissertation, Fault-Tolerance and Load Management in a Distributed Stream Processing System, was supervised by Hari Balakrishnan.

She joined the University of Washington faculty in 2006, and served the university as Director of the eScience Institute and Associate Vice Provost for Data Science before, in 2019, being appointed as director of the Paul G. Allen School of Computer Science & Engineering. Her term as director concluded in 2026.

== Recognition ==
Balazinska's work on fault-tolerant distributed stream processing and on reengineering software clones has won awards for its long-term impact. She was elected as an ACM Fellow in 2019 "for contributions to scalable distributed data systems".
