= Mile-high club =

People who have had sex during an aircraft flight

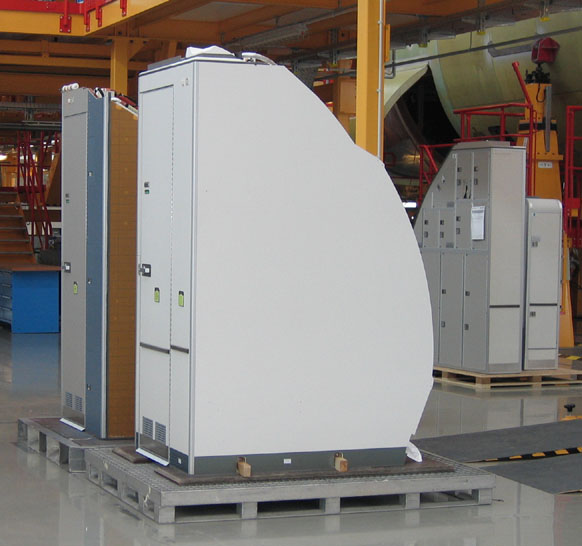
An airplane lavatory prior to installation

The mile-high club is slang for people who have had sexual intercourse on board an aircraft during flight. While this usually refers to sexual acts in an airliner lavatory (for privacy), a sexual act anywhere on a plane in flight would fit the term. The airplane just needs to be in the air (i.e. no landing gears touching the tarmac), not literally a mile above the ground, during the sexual activity, in order to qualify for the "mile high club".

Some also theorize that people who engage in the act have had personal fantasies about pilots, flight attendants, or other aircraft crew, or a fetish about planes themselves, a type of mechanophilia. For others, the appeal of joining the mile-high club is the thrill of doing something taboo and the thrill of the risk of being discovered, as well as the thrill of simply engaging in sexual intercourse thousands of feet above the Earth.

== History ==
An early reference to the concept is found in the betting book for Brooks's, a London gentlemen's club. The 1785 entry (only two years after the first successful balloon ascent by Étienne Montgolfier) reads: "Ld. Cholmondeley has given two guineas to Ld. Derby, to receive 500 Gs whenever his lordship fucks a woman in a Balloon one thousand yards from the Earth." There is no further indication whether the bet was paid, or how any claim would be validated.

During the First World War, German ace Oswald Boelcke was disciplined by superiors for taking a nurse up in the cockpit of his fighter, allegedly becoming the first person to qualify as a member of the club (although the claim is dubious, considering the cramped cockpit space and the pilot requirement to constantly keep hands and feet on the control stick and rudder pedals; others maintain it was a simple joyride).

Pilot/engineer Lawrence Sperry and socialite Dorothy Rice Sims have been described as the first people to engage in sex while flying in an airplane; the two flew in an autopilot-equipped Curtiss Flying Boat near New York in November 1916.

The American National Transportation Safety Board reported on a 1991 incident in which sexual activity was at least partly responsible for the fatal crash of a Piper PA-34.

In November 2007, the BBC reported a story headlined "Airline Bans A380 Mile-High Club". The Airbus A380 allows double beds to be installed in the first-class cabin, but Singapore Airlines' cabins are not soundproof; shortly after installing the new seats/beds, the airline requested that first-class travelers respect other passengers.

== Reported instances ==
Some incidents of people attempting sexual activity on planes have been reported in the media:

- Richard Branson, the British billionaire entrepreneur and owner of the Virgin Group, including Virgin Atlantic and Virgin Australia, claimed that he joined the mile-high club at age 19 (c. 1969) in the plane's lavatory. Afterwards, he found out that his partner in the act was married, and the two had no relationship beyond the encounter in the plane.
- In October 1999, two passengers of an American Airlines flight from Dallas to Manchester were arrested after engaging in "sex acts" in front of other passengers in the business class section of the aircraft. Both lost their jobs after the press storm following the incident.
- A 2005 British Airways flight from London to Jamaica diverted to Bermuda when a couple on board, who had possibly been intoxicated even before consuming more beer and wine on the plane, threatened flight attendants after they told them to return to their seats when the attendants found Nicola Fitzgerald giving a lap dance to Trevor Blake in a crew jump seat; ultimately, the two were physically confined to their seats. The two claimed later they had already had sex twice in the aircraft lavatory before their return to the UK. Blake was sentenced to prison and Fitzgerald was sentenced to community service.
- In late 2006, a couple was arrested in part for refusing to stop overt sexual activity on a flight in a case that received widespread media attention. The couple's lawyer claimed that the couple were not engaging in sexual activity, but that the man was sick and resting his head on the woman's lap.
- In 2007, British actor Ralph Fiennes was embroiled in scandal after having sex with a Qantas flight attendant on a flight from Sydney to Mumbai. After initial denials, it was established that they had had sex in the plane's lavatory, after which the flight attendant was suspended and later terminated.
- On a Virgin flight in February 2007, Danish co-founder of the Skype application, Janus Friis, openly had sex with Christina Knudsen, Roger Moore's stepdaughter, when travelling to the Academy Awards show.
- On a flight from Luton to Ibiza in September 2023, a couple was caught having sex.

== Legality ==
The BBC ran an article investigating whether sex on a plane was legal. Their conclusion was that it would depend on many factors, such as whether or not the act occurred in sight of others. If British law applied, for example, it may constitute sex in a lavatory to which the public has access, contrary to Sexual Offences Act 2003 s.71, with a maximum 6-month term of imprisonment.

Also, for international flights, the law could vary depending on departure and destination cities and the nation of the carrier airline, as well as the country of registration of the aircraft, and possibly the citizenship of the people involved.

In January 2011, the United Kingdom's aviation regulator body, the Civil Aviation Authority (CAA), refused to recertify Mile-High Flights, an air charter company located in Gloucestershire, for allowing its passengers to have sex while in-flight.

== Charter flights ==
Some commercial enterprises cash in on people's interest in joining the "club" by offering special charter flights designed for the purpose. Starting in 2014, a North Las Vegas Airport-based charter company called Love Cloud began operating flights specifically for the purpose, using a pair of Cessna 414 aircraft.

== See also ==
- Birth aboard aircraft and ships
- Public sex
- Sex in space
- Cottaging
