= Radha Balakrishnan =

Indian physicist

- Education: Delhi University; Brandeis University
- Spouse: V. Balakrishnan
- Children: Hari Balakrishnan (son); Hamsa Balakrishnan (daughter)
- Scientific career
- Fields: Physics
- Workplaces: Department of Theoretical Physics, University of Madras; Institute of Mathematical Sciences, Chennai

Radha Balakrishnan is an Indian theoretical physicist. She is a retired professor at the Institute of Mathematical Sciences, Chennai, India. After her early work in condensed matter physics on quantum crystals, she switched fields to nonlinear dynamics and has published research papers on a variety of topics.

== Education ==
Radha Balakrishnan pursued her physics honours from Delhi University and finished her M.Sc. in 1965. She has a Ph.D. from Brandeis University.

== Career ==
During the 1980s, when Balakrishnan returned to India, she worked at the department of theoretical physics, University of Madras as a research associate. She joined Institute of Mathematical Sciences, Chennai in 1987. She retired in the year 2004 and since that time, Balakrishnan has been continuing her research as a CSIR Emeritus Scientist. Her current research is on nonlinear dynamics, solitons and applications in physics, connections to classical differential geometry. An autobiographical essay of her career in Indian academia and sciences appears in 'Lilavati's Daughters' published by the Indian Academy of Sciences in 2008. Balakrishnan has spoken at occasions in her first person account, as well as at conclaves on gender barriers for women in STEM, and the challenges she had to overcome.

== Personal life ==
Radha Balakrishnan is married to V. Balakrishnan who is an Indian theoretical physicist. They have two children, Hari Balakrishnan and Hamsa Balakrishnan, who are both faculty members at the Massachusetts Institute of Technology.

== Awards & Honours ==
From the 1990s, she had been studying the deep connections between nonlinearity and the differential geometry of curves and surfaces. In 1995–96, Balakrishnan was awarded a Fulbright Scholarship to pursue research on 'Non-linear dynamics in Low-Dimensional Magnetic Systems,' as a visiting scholar hosted by the Los Alamos Scientific Laboratories. In 1999, Balakrishnan received the Tamil Nadu Scientists Award in the Physical Sciences for her work. She also received INSA’s Professor Darshan Ranganathan Memorial Lecture Award (2005) for original and pioneering contributions in nonlinear dynamics.
