= Isaac Rice (businessman) =

American lawyer

Isaac Leopold Rice
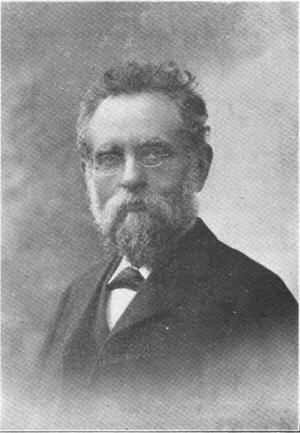
- Isaac Rice, published 1905
- Born: February 22, 1850; Wachenheim, Bavaria
- Died: November 2, 1915 (aged 65); New York City, US
- Education: Columbia College Law School
- Occupation: Business executive
- Years active: 1880–1915
- Known for: Founder of the Electric Boat Company and others; chess expert
- Spouse: Julia Barnett Rice (1885–1915)

Isaac Leopold Rice (February 22, 1850 – November 2, 1915) was a German-born American businessman, investor, musicologist, author, and chess patron. As part of a successful career in the manufacturing industry, in 1899 he acquired the Holland Torpedo Boat Company, which was renamed the Electric Boat Company and produced submarines for the U.S. and British navies. It continues today as General Dynamics Electric Boat.

== Life and career ==
Rice was born in Wachenheim, Bavaria, in 1850. When he was six years old, he emigrated to the United States with his mother, brother, and sister in 1856. They settled in Milwaukee, where his father, Maier Rice, was already established in business. Several years later, the family moved to Philadelphia, where his father worked as a teacher of languages.

Rice was educated at Central High School in Philadelphia and at nineteen he was sent to Paris, where he studied music for three years. While there he sent stories to the Philadelphia newspapers for printing. In 1868 he moved to England, where he became a teacher of music and languages. On his return to America a year later he moved to New York City and practiced music before going back to school to become a lawyer. After graduating from Columbia College Law School in 1880 he practiced law for the rest of the decade.

In the practice of law he became more aware of and involved in the transportation business, mainly in the expanding railroad empires and their multiplying legal imbroglios. He was regarded in his time as one of the ablest specialists in railroad law in the United States, and held large investments in several lines, including the Philadelphia and Reading Railroad and Reading Railroad.

He was invited to start a publishing company by some associates in the music printing societies. In the 1890s he was looking to move and diversify and possibly invest early in emerging companies with a potential for growth. In 1892 he bailed out the bankrupt Electro-Dynamic Company in partnership with its proprietor, William Woodnut Griscom. He became the first president of The Forum magazine, and later the Electric Storage Battery Co. (later Exide) in 1897.

Some of the numerous other companies Rice organized or was involved in included the Electric Vehicle Company, Car Lighting and Power Company, American Casein Company, and the Consolidated Rubber Tire Company.

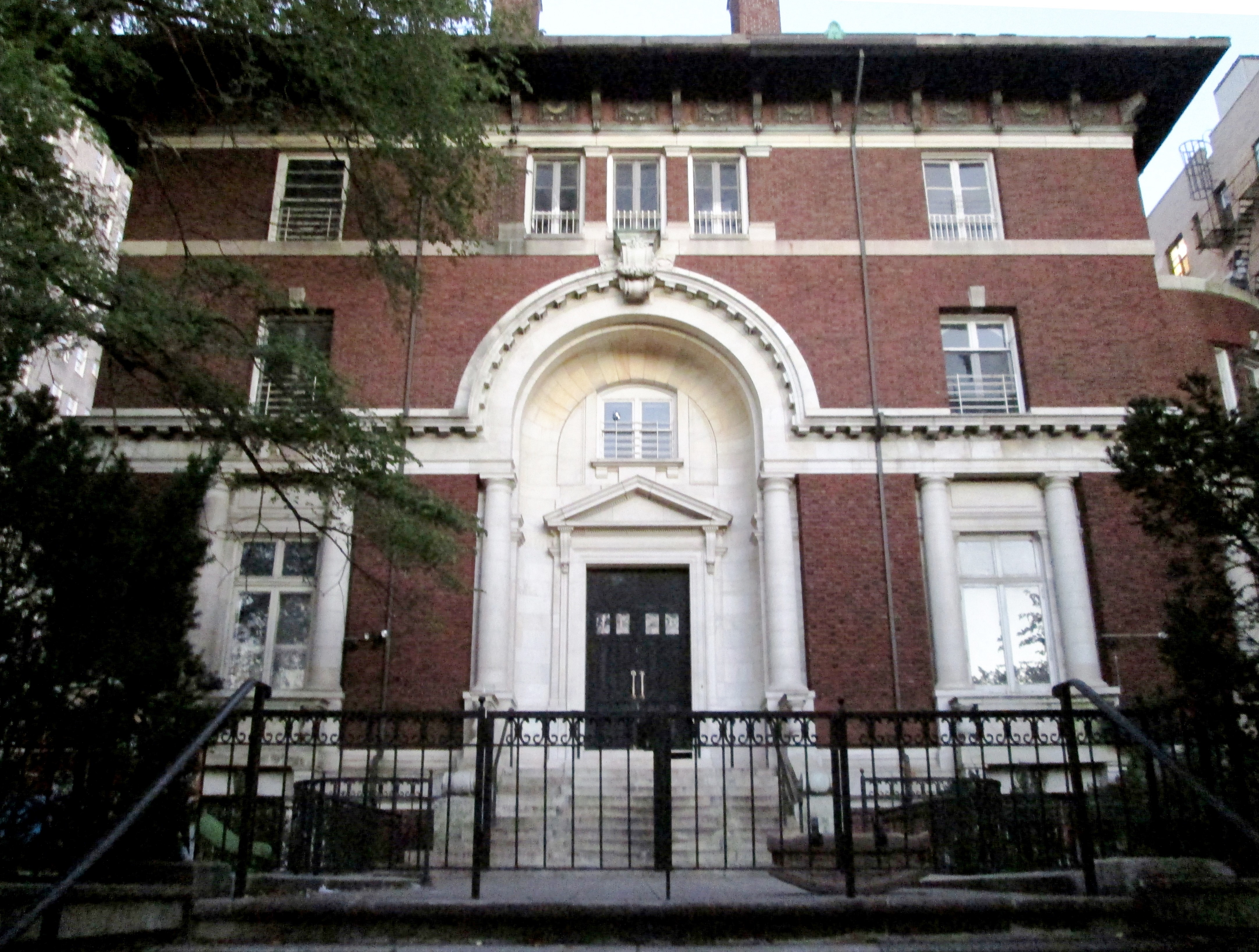
The Isaac L. and Julia B. Rice House, a New York City landmark listed on the National Register of Historic Places, currently Yeshiva Ketana of Manhattan

As president of Electric Storage, he became aware of the attempts (despite financial difficulties) since 1896 to deliver the first modern submarines for the US Navy, which ran on electric power while underwater. A year after the 1897 launch of their first vessel, the Holland VI, the management of John Philip Holland and Lewis Nixon (owner of the Crescent Shipyard in New Jersey, where Holland VI was built) found it difficult to finish making the last details operable and were running out of cash. Isaac Rice moved in, taking over and renaming the company as the Electric Boat Company on 7 February 1899. After a few months of negotiations and multiple tests, the United States Navy purchased Holland VI, renamed it USS Holland, and awarded the new company a contract to build its first fleet of Plunger-class submarines. Also in 1899, Rice added the Electric Launch Company (Elco) to his family of companies.

During World War I, Electric Boat and its subsidiaries, notably Elco, built 85 Navy submarines and 722 submarine chasers, along with 580 motor launches for the British Royal Navy (in the World War I era Electric Boat's submarines were built by subcontractors, primarily Fore River Shipbuilding in Quincy, Massachusetts). Electric Boat was a founding company of General Dynamics Corporation, which is the company's Cold War progeny.

In 1902 he received from Bates College the honorary degree of LL.D.

The books published by Rice include: "What Is Music?" (New York, 1875), which was supplemented by "How the Geometrical Lines Have Their Counterparts in Music" (ib. 1880). The latter work was subsequently made part of the "Humboldt Library of Science." He also contributed a large number of articles to the Century, The Forum, of which he was a founder, and North American Review.

== Personal life ==
Rice married Julia Hyneman Barnett on December 12, 1885. His "intellectual partner" and an "accomplished musician", Julia B. Rice campaigned successfully against the horns and whistles of ships and founded the Society for Suppression of Unnecessary Noise (1907). They had six children: Muriel "Polly", Dorothy "Dolly", Isaac Leopold Jr., Marion "Molly", Marjorie "Lolly", and Julian. Dorothy Rice (Peirce, Sims) and Marion Rice Hart both became famous sportswomen—aviators, among other things—and writers.

Rice died at the Hotel Ansonia in New York City on November 2, 1915. The obituary does not give the cause of death, but does state that he sold his Electric Boat stock for two million dollars (in 1915 money) a few months prior to it.

== Chess ==
Rice was a prominent figure in the American chess world. He became president of the Manhattan Chess Club, and presented for competition several trophies, including the one that was competed for annually by cable by the universities of Oxford and Cambridge, representing England, and those of Harvard, Yale, Princeton, and Columbia, representing the United States.

In 1895 he discovered a variation of the Kieseritzky Gambit, which then became known as the Rice Gambit (1.e4 e5 2.f4 exf4 3.Nf3 g5 4.h4 g4 5.Ne5 Nf6 6.Bc4 d5 7.exd5 Bd6 8.0-0). He then sponsored tournaments where the opening became the starting point of each game. Emanuel Lasker and Mikhail Chigorin were two of many players who contested these tournaments, with bonus prizes for white wins. In 1904 he formed the Rice Gambit Association which published a detailed analysis of the effects of the move.

=== Notable chess game ===
Rice played White in this game against Wordsworth Donisthorpe, played in London in 1892. 1.e4 e5 2.f4 exf4 3.Nf3 Be7 4.Bc4 Bh4+ 5.g3 fxg3 6.O-O d5 7.exd5 gxh2+ 8.Kh1 Bh3 9.Qe2+ Kf8 10.Rd1 Bg4 11.d4 Nf6 12.Nc3 Nh5 13.Ne4 f5 14.Rf1 "Fine repartee. If Black now take the knight, White recovers with advantage by 15 Nxh4+." Nd7 15.Qg2 Bf6 16.Neg5 Qe7 17.Ne6+ Kf7 18.Nfg5+ Bxg5 "A beautiful termination is here avoided if 18...Kg6 19 Qxg4 fxg4 20 Bd3+ Kh6 21 Nf7 mate." 19.Qxg4 Bxc1 20.Qxh5+ g6 21.Rxf5+ "White's conduct of the attack is of high scientific order. This involves a well devised sacrifice of the exchange which we find sound in various intricate complications." Nf6 22.d6 "White's play in the main deserves special marks of distinction." cxd6 23.Rxf6+ "Quite in keeping with the fine quality of the preceding train of moves on White's part." Qxf6 24.Qd5 "White administers the quietus with this very clever stroke." b5 25.Qb7+ Qe7 26.Ng5+ Kf6 27.Ne4+ Qxe4+ 28.Qxe4 1-0 Annotations by World Champion Wilhelm Steinitz in the New York Tribune.
