= West Side Community Garden =

Community garden in Manhattan, New York

Coordinates: 40°47′21.4″N 73°58′18.6″W

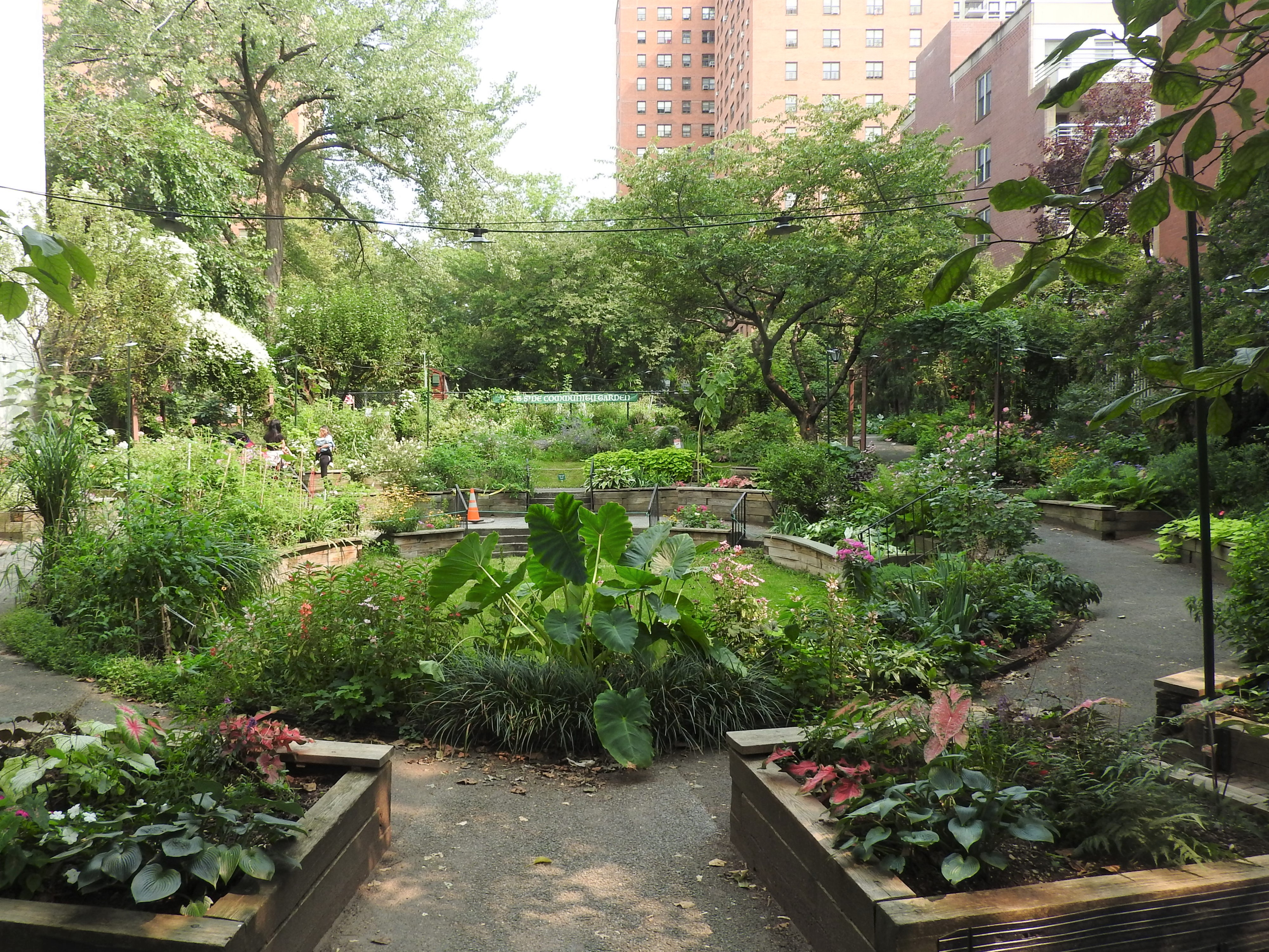
Community garden

The West Side Community Garden is a privately owned 501(c)(3) garden in Manhattan, New York City, United States. It is located between West 89th Street and West 90th Street in the middle of the block between Amsterdam Avenue and Columbus Avenue.

== History ==
The WestSide Community Garden was founded in 1975 on a large vacant lot filled with garbage and stripped cars locally known as "strip city" which fronted on Columbus Avenue between West 89th and 90th streets. The vacant lot was designated development Site 35 by the city and was part of the comprehensive West Side Urban Renewal Plan. The WestSide Community Garden was incorporated in 1983 as a New York State Not For Profit organization with the help of the Trust for Public Land. About the same time, the city awarded Site 35 development rights to the developers Jerry Kretchmer and Joe Wasserman. A long negotiation with the developers and the Community Planning Board 7 began and in 1985 the garden won the right to permanent garden status in the Community board by one vote. It was subsequently approved by the NYC City Planning Board, the City Council and the Mayor. This set aside 16,000 square feet (1,500 m^{2}) for a permanent garden in Manhattan.

The new garden would be about one third of the original Garden site and a memorandum of understanding was signed with the developer for the design and development of the permanent garden. Community garden members developed the concept for the public flower park and amphitheater, and landscape designer Terry Schnadelback designed the Garden based on that concept. Construction began fall 1987 and the new garden was ready Summer 1988. The land was deeded to the WestSide Community Garden Inc. in a complicated seven-hour, three-part closing, the day before Thanksgiving in 1989 - from the city to the developer, to Trust for Public Land - to the garden entity. The closing took place in small room in downtown Manhattan and each representatives for entity involved was present with their team of attorneys as well as the title company.

== The Facilities ==
=== Gardens ===
About two thirds of the property is devoted to flowers and one third to vegetables and herbs. Gardeners maintain and use the greenhouse at the Cathedral of St. John the Divine to raise almost all the flowers planted at the garden, and coordinate the work load and donate plants to the Cathedral gardens, the Broadway Mall Gardeners, Riverside Park gardeners, the 111th Street garden and other neighborhood gardens. In the gated vegetable garden area near West 90th Street, there are 87 individual vegetable beds,6 school class plots, a berry patch and a rose garden. There are also community compost bins where garden members a may deposit their coffee grounds and other vegetable waste. Along the west fence is a community herb bed, and espaliered fruit trees. There are more fruit trees planted along 90th Street and a large persimmon tree that produces fruit each autumn.

Outside the vegetable fence is a walkway between West 90th Street and 89th Streets, a favored mid-block easement pass-through for the neighborhood. Along that path near 90th street is a perennial garden by the vegetable garden fence. A shade garden holds river birches, Chinese cedar trees and ornamental shrubs along the buildings on the east side of the pathway. At the midpoint between 89th and 90th Streets is a large rockery designed by Nadia Zamichow, and a trellis on both sides with seating. All the plantings in these areas are Community plantings open to volunteers and members. Near 89th Street is a tiered floral amphitheater with 26 Flower plots assigned to individual Flower Committee members. In the middle of the amphitheater is a sunken lawn oval - which serves as a playing area for the yearly children's Shakespeare Festival, and a seating area for the Sunday Summer Concert series,"Music in a Garden."

=== Compost Bins ===
The garden has two aerated-static compost bins. See Program section for more details.

=== Greenhouse ===
The garden's greenhouse facility is located at the backyard of The Cathedral Church of St. John the Divine.

== Programs ==
=== Compost Program ===
The garden has composted from the early days of the garden, gathering food scraps and garden waste from the garden membership. In 2019, the garden started a weekly food scrap dropoff program for the community. The composting program is led by a NYC Master Composter, who leads a volunteer team of 130 garden members to manage has aerated static pile that create compost for use in the garden. The WSCG participates in the NYC Food Scrap Drop Off Network.

In 2023, the garden's compost program won a grant from Greenacre Foundation, which funded the construction of its two aerated-static compost bins.

=== Annual Benefit ===
The garden organizes an annual benefit each June, which is the only event that is closed to the public and only available to ticket holders.

=== Annual Tulip Festival ===
The garden organizes its members to plant tulips every year, and its award-winning annual tulip festival has attracted visitors from all over the world.

=== Music in a Garden ===
The garden also has an annual music concert series runs from May to June.

== See also ==
- Community Gardens in New York City
- Community gardening in the United States
