= Alex Snoeren =

American computer scientist

Alex Snoeren is a computer science professor at the University of California, San Diego. He graduated from the Georgia Institute of Technology in 1997.

Snoeren was elected as an ACM Fellow in 2018 for "innovative approaches to measuring, managing and detecting network traffic". In 2019, he was elected as an IEEE Fellow for "contributions to management and security of networked systems."
