= Hamsa Balakrishnan =

Indian-American aerospace engineer

Hamsa Balakrishnan is an Indian and American aerospace engineer whose research concerns the control theory and optimization of large-scale transportation systems, particularly focusing on airport and airplane traffic, routing, and congestion, and the prediction of flight delays and weather-related air traffic disruption. She is William E. Leonhard (1940) Professor in the Department of Aeronautics and Astronautics and associate dean of the School of Engineering at the Massachusetts Institute of Technology.

== Education and career ==
Balakrishnan has a 2000 bachelor's degree from IIT Madras. She continued her studies at Stanford University with a 2002 master's degree and a 2006 Ph.D. Her doctoral dissertation, Target-tracking and identity management algorithms for air traffic surveillance, was supervised by Claire J. Tomlin.

After postdoctoral research at NASA's Ames Research Center, she joined MIT as an assistant professor in 2007. She was promoted to associate professor in 2012 and full professor in 2019. She became associate dean in 2024.

She is the co-founder of spinoff corporation Lumo, based on her work on flight delay prediction.

== Recognition ==
The American Institute of Aeronautics and Astronautics (AIAA) gave Balakrishnan their 2012 Lawrence Sperry Award, "for the development and implementation of advanced air traffic management techniques leading to significant environmental improvements". She was the 2014 recipient of the Donald P. Eckman Award of the American Automatic Control Council, recognized "for excellence in the control design, analysis, implementation, and evaluation of practical algorithms to improve the efficiency and environmental performance of air transportation systems".

She was named as a Fellow of the AIAA, in the 2025 class of fellows.

== Personal life ==
Balakrishnan is the daughter of physicists V. Balakrishnan and Radha Balakrishnan, and the sister of MIT computer scientist Hari Balakrishnan.
