= Wendi Heinzelman =

American electrical engineer and computer scientist

- Education: Cornell University; Massachusetts Institute of Technology
- Scientific career
- Fields: electrical engineering; computer science
- Workplaces: University of Rochester

Wendi Beth Rabiner Heinzelman is an American electrical engineer and computer scientist specializing in wireless networks, cloud computing, and multimedia. She is dean of the Hajim School of Engineering and Applied Sciences at the University of Rochester, and the former dean of graduate studies for arts, sciences, and engineering at Rochester.

== Education and career ==
Heinzelman's parents worked as an electrical engineer and a teacher. She did her undergraduate studies at Cornell University, graduating in 1995 with a bachelor's degree in electrical engineering, and completed her Ph.D. in electrical engineering and computer science at the Massachusetts Institute of Technology in 2000. She joined the Rochester faculty in 2001.

== Books ==
With Stanislava Soro, Heinzelman is the author of Resource Management Policies for Wireless and Visual Sensor Networks (VDM Publishing, 2008). With Lei Chen, she is the author of Protocols for Supporting QoS in Mobile Ad Hoc Networks (VDM Publishing, 2008). With Bulent Tavli, she is the author of Mobile Ad Hoc Networks: Energy-Efficient Real-Time Data Communications (Springer, 2006).

== Recognition ==
Heinzelman was named an IEEE Fellow in 2016 for "contributions to algorithms, protocols, and architectures for wireless sensor and mobile networks". She was elected as an ACM Fellow in 2018 for "contributions to wireless communication systems and protocols and leadership in broadening participation in computing".
