= Marion Rice Hart =

American writer and aviator

- Born: Marion Rice; 10 October 1891; London, England
- Died: 2 July 1990 (aged 98); Berkeley, California, U.S.
- Education: Columbia University
- Occupations: Physicist, engineer, sculptor, aviator
- Employer: General Electric Corporation
- Spouse: Arthur Hart
- Parents: Isaac Rice (father); Julia Barnett Rice (mother)
- Relatives: Dorothy Rice Sims (sister)
- Awards: Harmon Trophy (1975)

Marion Rice Hart (10 October 1891 – July 2, 1990) was an American sportswoman and writer and the first woman to graduate in chemical engineering from the Massachusetts Institute of Technology.

== Early life and family ==
Marion Hart was born in London, the fourth of six children of Julia (née Barnett) and Isaac L. Rice, a businessman who founded the Electric Boat Company (producer of submarines for the US Navy and others). Her older sister Dorothy Rice Peirce Sims (1889–1960) also became famous as an aviator and sportswoman. Their mother Julia B. Rice founded the Society for the Suppression of Unnecessary Noises in New York City.

According to the cultural historian Hillel Schwartz, as paraphrased by a New Yorker journalist:

"In 1903, Isaac Rice and his wife and intellectual partner, Julia Barnett Rice—both accomplished musicians—sought to escape noisy Broadway. They built a four-story mansion on the tree-lined drive, then a place replete with coaches and foreign servants, and largely free from cars. Julia had a medical degree; Isaac, a venture capitalist, invested in things like air compressors, submarines, and the "pickled energy" that powered electric vehicles."

Julia Rice's campaign resulted in a federal law "quieting the whistles of ships in federal waters".

== Education and careers ==
Age 15 Marion Hart read a magazine article of the railroad being built across the Andes and decided she wanted to be an engineer and at 16, she entered Barnard College where she stayed for two years before transferring to becoming the first woman to graduate in chemical engineering from the Massachusetts Institute of Technology. She later earned a master's degree in geology from Columbia University. After college, she worked as a physicist at General Electric Corporation for eighteen months. She later worked in a copper mine in Arizona with her husband, served as a radio operator on a B-17, and ran a locomotive on the Southern Pacific. In 1926 she took up painting and sculpture in a villa she bought in Montfavet, France.

== Flying and sailing ==
In 1936, having been working as a sculptor in Avignon, France, Marion Hart captained a 72-foot ketch around the world in a three-year voyage, mostly unaccompanied after firing a number of incompetent skippers and learning how to navigate herself.

When the voyage ended in 1939, she became a ham radio operator and in World War II joined the Army Signal Corps. According to a 1960 obituary of her sister, Dorothy Rice Sims, Hart had "achieved note during the [1930s] by sailing across 30,000 miles of ocean in an 80-foot ketch". Dorothy was survived by Marion and three others of their siblings.

Hart was 54 when she learned to fly, receiving her amateur pilot's license in 1946. In 1962, at the age 70 she flew a single-engine Beechcraft Bonanza from Newfoundland to Ireland nonstop across the Atlantic, a flight of 2,500 miles. She is said on arrival to have walked into the airport lounge, downed a large glass of whisky and said, ''Now I feel better.'' She made seven further solo flights across the Atlantic (the last at 83), and flew in the United States, Europe, Asia, Africa and South America, flying alone until she was 87. Hart logged over 5,000 hours in thirty years of flying.

She was awarded the 1975 Harmon Trophy for ''for her consistently outstanding performance as a private pilot operating small aircraft on a global scale.

== Personal life ==
Marion Rice Hart married Arthur Hart, a mining engineer but divorced him after seven years as he wanted her to be like other women. She died of pneumonia at Alta Bates Hospital in Berkeley aged 98 on 2 July 1990.

== Books by Hart ==
- Who Called That Lady a Skipper? (1938) describing her voyage on the ketch Vanora (ISBN 0-7812-8169-5).
- How to Navigate Today (1940) a treatise on celestial navigation (ISBN 0-87033-035-7), and
- I Fly as I Please (1953, Vanguard Press) describing her aerial adventures.
