= Dorothy Rice Sims =

American sportswoman, aviator, journalist, and socialite (1889–1960)

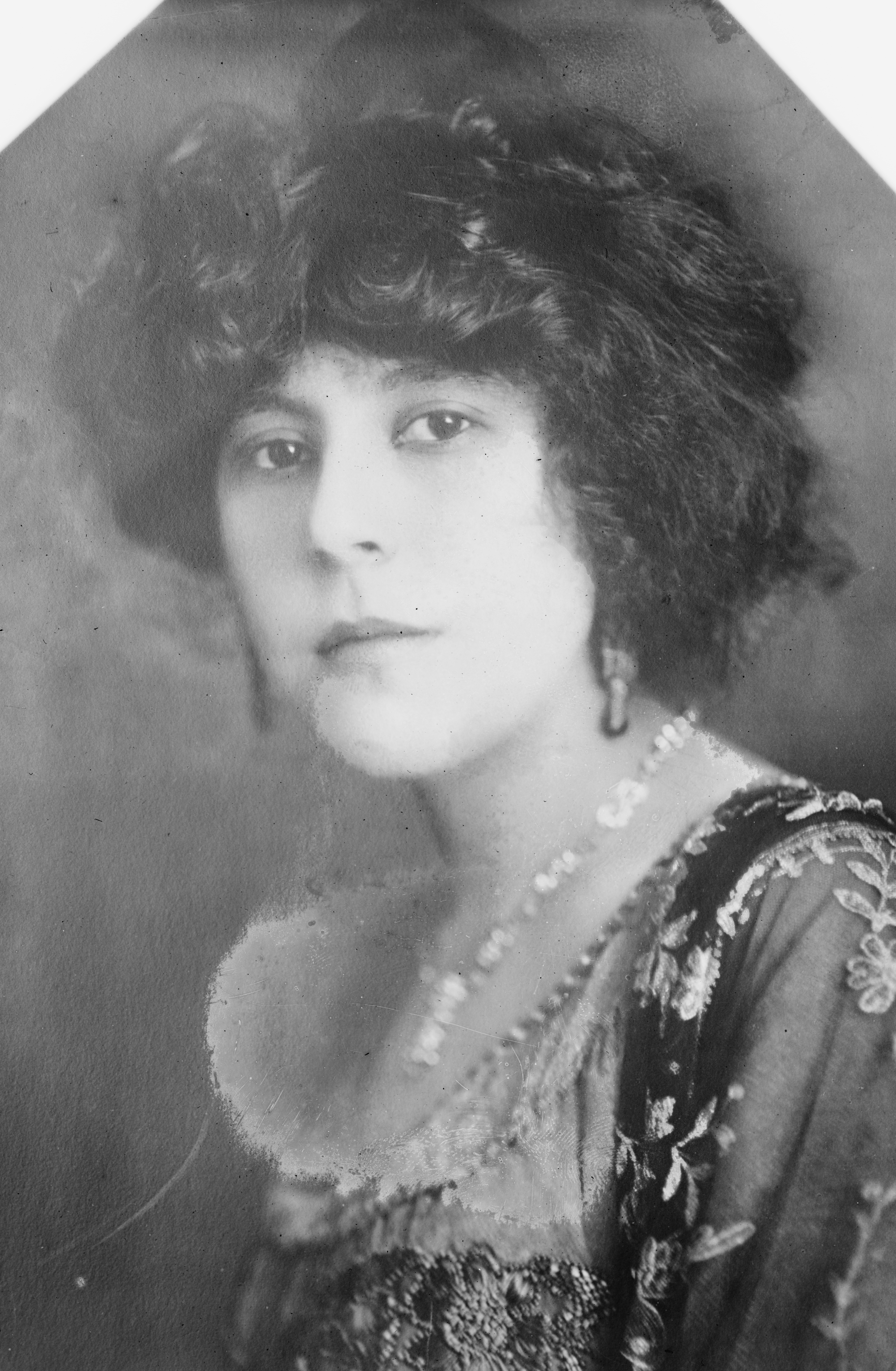
- Mrs. Waldo Peirce (1912-1917)
- Born: June 24, 1889; Asbury Park, New Jersey
- Died: March 24, 1960 (aged 70); Cairo, Egypt

Dorothy Rice Sims (June 24, 1889 – March 24, 1960) was an American sportswoman, aviator, bridge player, artist, and journalist.

== Family ==
Born in Asbury Park, New Jersey, on June 24, 1889, Sims was one of six children of Julia (née Barnett) and Isaac Rice, a businessman (or corporation lawyer) who founded the Electric Boat Company (producer of submarines for the US Navy and others). Her younger sister Marion (1891–1990, Marion Rice Hart) also became famous as an aviator and sportswoman. ("Before her flying career, Mrs. Hart had captained a 72-foot ketch around the world, most of the way alone.") Their mother Julia B. Rice founded the Society for the Suppression of Unnecessary Noises in New York City.

Father Isaac Rice was born in Bavaria and raised in Philadelphia. He was also a musician and musicologist, chess player and patron. Dorothy and Marion were the second and fourth of six children, the second and third of four daughters.

According to the cultural historian Hillel Schwartz, as paraphrased by a New Yorker journalist:

"In 1903, Isaac Rice and his wife and intellectual partner, Julia Barnett Rice—both accomplished musicians—sought to escape noisy Broadway. They built a four-story mansion on the tree-lined drive, then a place replete with coaches and foreign servants, and largely free from cars. Julia had a medical degree; Isaac, an industrialist, invested in things like air compressors, submarines, and the 'pickled energy' that powered electric vehicles."

Julia Rice's campaign resulted in a federal law "quieting the whistles of ships in federal waters".

== Early years ==
"The careers of the six Rice children attracted considerable attention in New York, because their parents encouraged them to stifle their inhibitions." Dorothy Rice left school at twelve, she recalled in her 1940 memoir Curiouser and Curiouser, seeing "no point in clogging my mind with things that everyone knew"; her father was pleased rather than vexed. Later she studied sculpture and painting in Paris.

As a young woman she was a motorcycle street racer riding a blue Indian and became the first amateur licensed woman pilot in the United States, training at Wright School, Mineola, New York, in 1916.

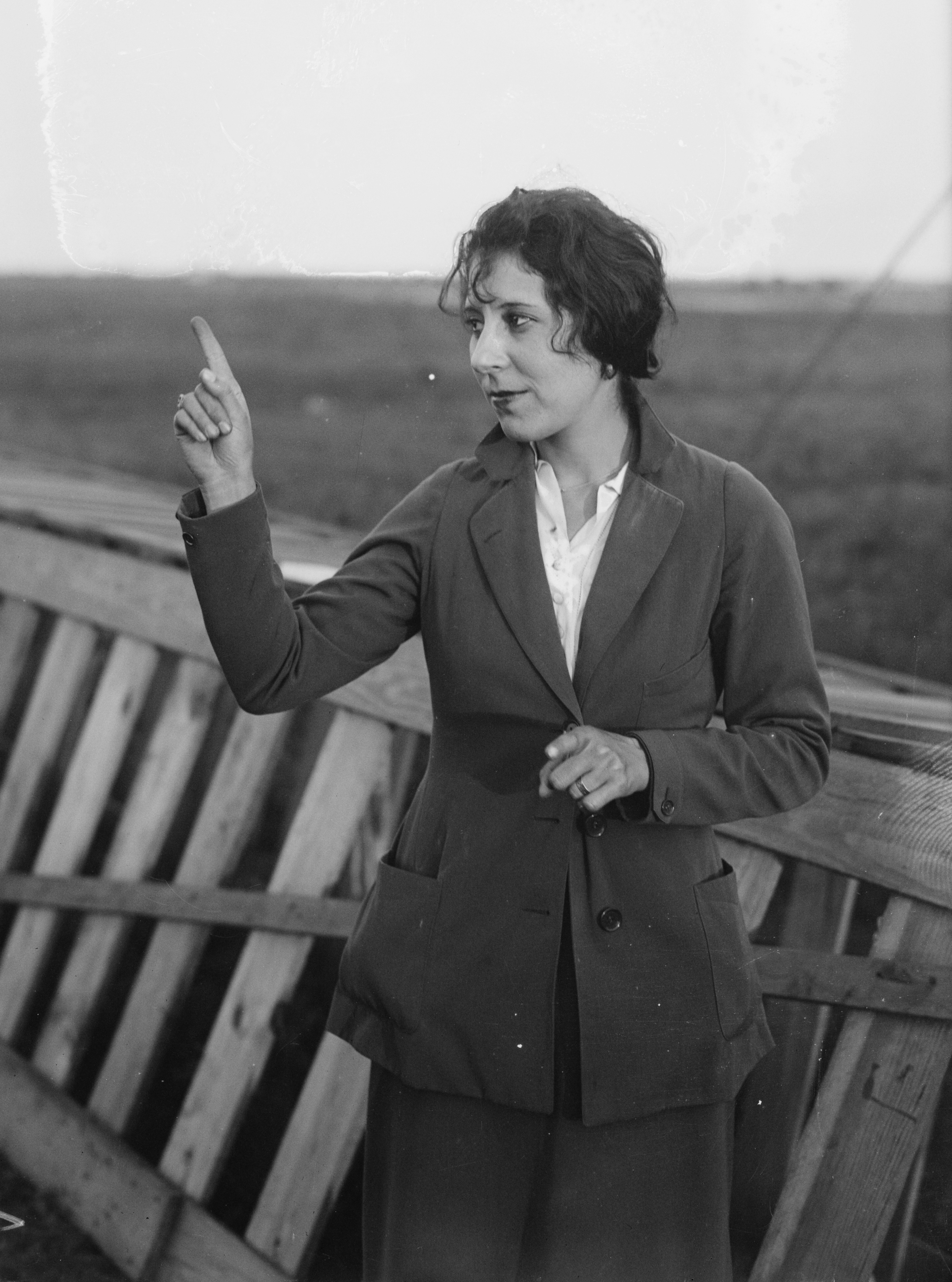
"Mrs. Waldo Peirce", c. 1916

Rice married first husband artist Waldo Peirce in 1912. She met Peirce through a mutual friend, George Biddle, and wrote in her 1940 autobiography, Curiouser and Curiouser, "I inquired Waldo's height—he was six feet two. This seemed a dignified height. I told George to produce Waldo, which he did. We got married in Madrid, in a German Methodist Church, with the American vice-consul, who was a Filipino, to make it legal."

A website using the name Mile High Club regards the "Club's" "founder" as pilot and design engineer Lawrence Sperry, along with "socialite Mrs. Waldo Peirce" (Dorothy Rice) citing their flight in an autopilot-equipped Curtiss Flying Boat near New York in November 1916.

"Why, Mrs Peirce and I didn't have what you might dignify by calling a real accident. It was only a trivial mishap. We decided to land on the water and came down perfectly from a height of 600 feet and would have made a perfect landing had not the hull of our machine struck one of the stakes that dot the water, which staved a hole in it."

The New York Times reported on October 16, 1917, that Dorothy Rice Peirce "seeks divorce; ... alleges non-support and cruelty".

She met Hal Sims when he chartered her plane; they later married. Their home in Deal, New Jersey, described in The Brooklyn Daily Eagle as reminiscent "of the castles of the feudal barons in medieval days" became a headquarters for bridge experts.

== Bridge ==
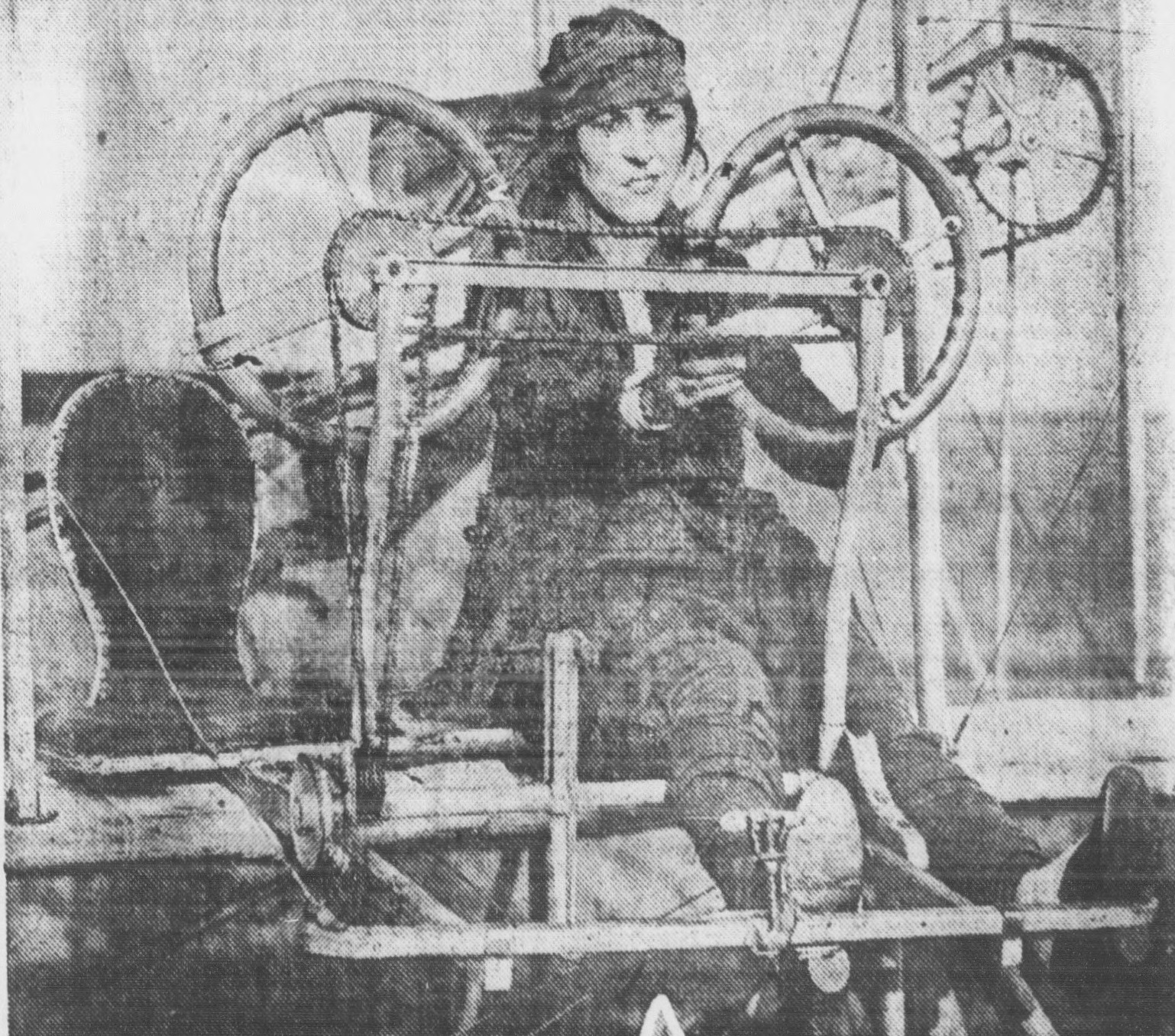
Dorothy getting her pilot's license

Sims was "an expert in motorcycle racing, flying and sculptoring, but her bridge ability was just moderate". She became a famous bridge player, however, as one of her expert husband's partners and for her frequent use of "psychic" bids, or "psyches" (bluffs); she is credited with having coined the term "psychic". According to bridge player and writer, Albert Morehead, "She did not actually invent the psychic bid, though it is generally credited to her, but she did give it its name and she wrote the first and only book about it." (Note: Harold S. Vanderbilt refers to "bluff bidding", one type of psychic bidding, in his 1929 book Contract Bridge.)

Sims and Sims won the second annual (contract bridge) Master Mixed Teams tournament in 1930, evidently with two men as teammates. (Except 1930, the winners and runners-up apparently comprised two men and two women, presumably playing as mixed pairs.) They were runners-up in 1933. In 1930 they were also runners-up in the second annual Board-a-Match Teams for the Chicago Trophy (now the Reisinger).

Sims and Sims faced Ely and Josephine Culbertson in a long rubber bridge match during March and April 1935 (Culbertson–Sims match). ["The Culbertsons won by 16,130 points in 150 rubbers."] After her death in 1960, New York Times bridge columnist Albert Hodges Morehead wrote that "bridge lost the last and most lovable of the greatest and most colorful foursome it ever knew. ... These four took contract bridge ... and made it a world-wide habit. They accomplished this partly by design but more by the accident of their personalities." Dorothy was "delightfully naive and guilelessly outspoken. Each was a perfect foil for all three of the others."

Morehead also observed that he (twenty years younger) "loved Dorothy devotedly". Morehead had been one of three substitute players available to the Culbertsons in the Culbertson–Sims match contested for three weeks beginning March 25, 1935. His byline appeared on a weekly article covering bridge beginning November 3, 1935 (for the Vanderbilt Cup tournament) and he remained the bridge editor until succeeded by Alan Truscott in January 1964.

According to her obituary in the New York Herald Tribune, her trademark psychic bidding "was but another manifestation of an instinct for nonconformity ... developed in her during childhood."

National championships

Sims was a winner or runner-up in "national" tournaments exclusively before the creation of the American Contract Bridge League by merger of competing organizations in 1937. Today the ACBL recognizes the following as her achievements in North American Bridge Championships-level competition. Beside the limitation to first and second place it may be incomplete in the extent of contemporary competition for "national" titles.

Wins

- Master Mixed Teams (1) 1930

Runners-up

- Master Mixed Teams (1) 1933
- Chicago Trophy (now the Reisinger) (1) 1930

The Master Mixed and Chicago were mixed and open teams-of-four tournaments inaugurated in 1929. On all three listed occasions Sims and Sims played as partners. The inaugural, 1929 Mixed Teams runner-up is unknown.

== Death ==
After the death of P. Hal Sims in 1949, she traveled as a "political correspondent for various newspapers".

She died of a heart attack on March 24, 1960, while in Cairo, Egypt, "on the eve of her return home from a world tour".

== Books ==
- Sims, Dorothy Rice (1932). Psychic Bidding. New York: Vanguard Press. LCCN 32014125. OCLC 4311409.
- Fog, Valentine Williams and Sims (Houghton Mifflin, 1933), 294 pp. – fiction, OCLC 27399416; translated and/or adapted into both French OCLC 458877472 and Spanish OCLC 803626452
- Just Bridge, Ewart Kempson and Sims (London: 1935) – Practical handbook series, no. 29, OCLC 314510956
- Curiouser and Curiouser, a Book in the Jugular Vein, illustrated by the author (Simon & Schuster, 1940) – autobiography; foreword by George S. Kaufman, 203 pp., LCCN 41-470, OCLC 1513442; backword by Grantland Rice
- How to Live on a Hunch; or, the art of "psychic living" (Vanguard, 1944), 160 pp., LCCN 44-2913, OCLC 1526700 – "essays on people and events of her experience"
