= Nick Principe =

American actor and stuntman (born 1978)

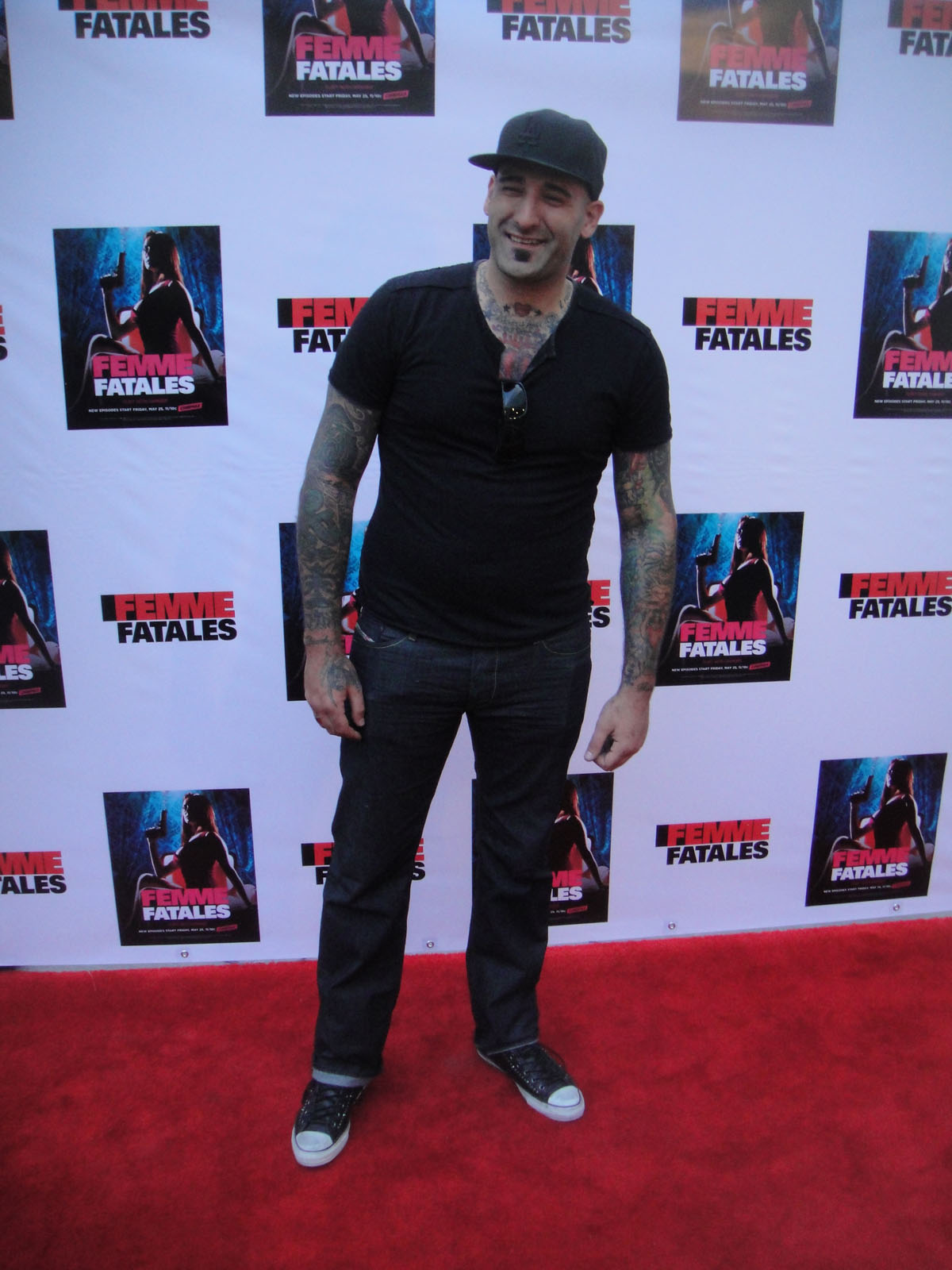
- Femme Fatales Red Carpet - Nick Principe
- Born: Nicholas J Principe; December 30, 1978 (age 47); Warwick, Rhode Island, United States
- Occupations: Actor, stuntman, production assistant
- Years active: 2006–present

Nicholas J Principe (born December 30, 1978) is an American actor and stuntman. He is best known for his role as ChromeSkull in Laid to Rest (2009) and its sequel, ChromeSkull: Laid to Rest 2 (2011).

== Early life ==
Principe was born in Warwick, Rhode Island and raised in Providence, Rhode Island. He moved from Providence to Los Angeles, California in hopes of playing monsters in films. He has cited Kane Hodder, Nick Castle, Boris Karloff as his inspiration for this desire. Principe discovered that most monsters are played by stunt performers. Already having a black belt in kenpō, and experienced in mixed martial arts fights, he started studying how to become a stuntman.

Three months after moving to Los Angeles, Principe was working in a music store and noticed a film production crew across the street. He approached a crew member, and was asked if he was a "PA", or production assistant. Ignorant of the term's meaning, Principe said that he was, and started working on the set. He ended up talking to the stunt coordinator and started doing stunt work in the film industry.

== Career ==
After some small roles on television series and movies, including his first role in Dead and Deader, Sands of Oblivion, Principe was cast in the role of ChromeSkull in Laid to Rest, a role he reprised in the film's 2011 sequel. Robert Green Hall, the writer-director of both films, met Principe on the set of Robert Englund's Killer Pads. After years of friendship, the pair met again at a screening of Wrong Turn 2, where Hall offered Principe the role. He based his performances on Roy Batty from Blade Runner (a performance Principe claims to base all of his characters on), Patrick Bateman from American Psycho, and Michael Myers from Halloween. Principe expressed interest in reprising his role in a third film, which he confirmed will be made when Hall's schedule opens up.

Also in 2011, Principe portrayed BLT in Brandon and Jason Trost's The FP. The film co-stars Jason Trost, Lee Valmassy, Caitlyn Folley, Art Hsu, Dov Tiefenbach, and James DeBello. It premiered at South by Southwest on March 13, 2011. He later played Damien in Madison County, Sledgesaw in Vs, also directed by Jason Trost and co-starring Valmassy, and Lori in The Summer of Massacre.

In 2013, he starred in Nobody Can Cool, Army of the Damned, and Self Storage.

In 2014, Principe starred in Seed 2: The New Breed and Ryan Nicholson's Collar. He is set to appear in American Muscle and Disciples, along with making his directorial debut, Stockholm later in the year.

Principe co-wrote the script for the 2023 film Johnny & Clyde.

== Filmography ==
=== As actor ===
Year	Title	Role	Notes
2006	Honor	Pit fighter (uncredited)	
2006	Death Row	Sparky (uncredited)	Television film
2006	The Thirst	Club Inferno bouncer (uncredited)	
2007	Sands of Oblivion	Anubis	Television film
2007	Big Stan	Tattoo artist (uncredited)	
2009	Laid to Rest	ChromeSkull	
2010	Hatchet II	Hunter (uncredited)	
2011	The FP	BLT	
2011	Stitched	Taliban Fighter/Lead Stitched	Short film
2011	ChromeSkull: Laid to Rest 2	ChromeSkull	
2011	Madison County	Damien Ewell	
2011	Vs	Sledgesaw	
2011	The Summer of Massacre	Lori Williams	Segment: "Lump"
2012	Femme Fatales	Killer	Television series Episode: "Crazy Mary"
2013	Nobody Can Cool	Len	
2013	Self Storage	Freddie	
2013	Army of the Damned	Donald	
2014	Blood Valley: Seed's Revenge	Maxwell Seed	Replaces Will Sanderson
2014	Collar	Massive	
2014	Disciples	Friedrich	Post-production
2014	Stockholm		Also director and associate producer
2014	American Muscle	John Falcon	
2018	FP2: Beats of Rage	BLT	

=== Other ===
Year	Title	Occupation
2006	Honor	Stunts
2006	Dead and Deader	Stunts, assistant property master
2007	Waitress	Set production assistant
2007	Fist of the Warrior	Stunts
2007	Halloween	Props
2008	Killer Pad	Stunts
2008	Evilution	Additional props
2011	Hyenas	Assistant property master
2011	Madison County	Stunt coordinator
2014	Blood Valley: Seed's Revenge	Stunt coordinator
