= The Guest (soundtrack) =

2014 soundtrack album by various artists

The Guest (Original Motion Picture Soundtrack)

Soundtrack album by various artists
- Released: September 16, 2014
- Genres: Electronic; synthwave; gothic rock; gothic pop
- Length: 1:00:33
- Label: J-2 Music
- Compiler: Adam Wingard

The Guest (Original Motion Picture Soundtrack) is the soundtrack album to the 2014 film of the same name directed by Adam Wingard. The 11-track album features songs ranging from electronic and synthwave to gothic rock and pop performed by several goth bands such as Clan of Xymox, Love and Rockets, Survive and artists such as Annie, Stevie B, Mike Simonetti among several others. The album was released by J-2 Music on September 16, 2014.

The musical score composed by Steve Moore was not released in public, but through the online music distributor Bandcamp on May 14, 2015. It then was distributed by Mondo through physical vinyl formats on June 4, 2015. The soundtrack album was later published by Mondo in late 2016. The music was positively received by critics, for its gothic nature and theme, that fits with the film.

== Development ==
Wingard admitted that he was a huge fan of film soundtracks, and particularly liked those of Mortal Kombat (1995) and later The Matrix (1999), which steered his interest to curate an electronic soundtrack for the film. He was by inspired the electronic goth band music from the 1980s, crediting bands such as Death in June, Deutsch-Amerikanische Freundschaft, Christian Death, and Clan of Xymox. Wingard's friend and music researcher Anna Neal, helped him with the vast collection of using the 1980s industrial goth music and included them in the album. His interest for 1980s goth came from a group of pot and mescaline dealers out in Alabama, referring "they were all gothed out all the time and they exposed me to bands like Death in June and Christian Death for the first time". While initially reading the script, he wanted the inspiration when it comes to the taste of music for Anna.

Wingard managed to include all of the bands, except for Death in June, as he originally envisioned that the character Anna was a "less pop-y". But when Maika Monroe was cast in the role, they took a different direction as "she's blonde and kind of bubbly" and tried to match the aspects of her personality. Hence, he felt it not right for her to listen to Death in June. The Love and Rockets song "Haunted When The Minutes Drag" was mentioned as the anthem of the film, which managed to include in the first place. He could not use the track "Black Celebration" by Depeche Mode, as while discussing with the music supervisor Jonathan McHugh, he tried to license one of the band's tracks, but the band members did not allow to do so. Three songs from the Clan of Xymox band were used in the film.

Steve Moore composed the film's score. Wingard came to know about him, when he was a part of the Zombi band giving an interview to Rue Morgue magazine, and through the band's official website. He listened to the band's albums and appreciated the "post-modern, throwback Italian thing" from Moore, which was ahead of the time. Wingard said "The reason that he stands out in that group is that he isn't doing a sampling or imitating thing. He's actually a real technician who feels strongly about using real, vintage instrumentation. He doesn't own anything made past 1990. That's sort of what led me to using him in this film, because that's kind of a metaphor for what I wanted. I didn't want an imitation of the 1980s; I wanted an authentic texturization of it, and that's what he brought to the table."

== Reception ==
=== Critical reception ===
Sputnik Music gave the album 4/5 saying "this is not your typical action thriller soundtrack, as The Guest is not your typical action thriller. Don't go in expecting sweeping orchestral jabs because you won't find any. The Guest's soundtrack is dark, dense, brooding, and occasionally beautiful, much like the film itself. This is a soundtrack that truly completes the movie experience, and as an added bonus, functions perfectly well as a standalone album." MetalSucks mentioned "Think of The Guest and its ilk as the total inverse of a Rob Zombie film: Its narrative and soundtrack both are aware of their own artifice, yet both roll out unhysterically and systematically. Plus, The Guest preys on a viewer's IMNisms, as Monroe's character, too, is a fan and agent of the movie's sounds: Love And Rockets, Annie, Front 242, Clan Of Xymox. All heavy-lidded and surprised to be feeling her own emotions, she often listens along with us — at a party, on her bed, in the passenger seat — and she even makes a mix CD for her mysterious crush! The thought of her peril is designed to stir a deep rage in your DNA." Spin-writer Maggie Serota mentioned "The Guest soundtrack checks most, if not all of those boxes, making it ideal listening for today, even if you've never seen the film. The songs nail the Halloween vibe but also avoid obvious choices, opting instead for a moody Love and Rockets deep cut and no less than three tracks from the early '80s Dutch darkwave band Clan of Xymox. It's also got a bit of the Drive influence that has made its imprint on so many successive movies, with tracks from more contemporaryartists like the Italo-disco-inspired duo Gatekeeper and the Italo disco inspired duo Gatekeeper and the Austin synth-wave outfit Survive."

=== Chart performance ===
Chart (2014)	Peak position
UK Compilation Albums (OCC)	45
UK Downloads Chart (OCC)	33
UK Soundtrack Albums (OCC)	32
US Billboard 200	88
US Soundtracks Albums (Billboard)	13

== Track listing ==
The Guest (Original Motion Picture Soundtrack)
No.	Title	Performer(s)	Length
1.	"Haunted When the Minutes Drag"	Love and Rockets	8:01
2.	"Hourglass"	Survive	4:30
3.	"Anthonio (Berlin Breakdown Version)"	Annie	4:14
4.	"The Magician"	Mike Simonetti	3:59
5.	"Masquerade"	Clan of Xymox	3:53
6.	"Omniverse"	Survive	4:34
7.	"Because I Love You (The Postman Song)"	Stevie B	5:03
8.	"Storm Column"	Gatekeeper	3:30
9.	"A Day"	Clan of Xymox	6:40
10.	"Emma"	The Sisters of Mercy	6:34
11.	"Obsidian"	Gatekeeper	4:19
12.	"Cry in the Wind"	Clan of Xymox	5:16
Total length:			1:00:33

== Score album ==
The 17-track original score composed by Steve Moore was officially published into his blog on the online music distributor platform Bandcamp on May 14, 2015, and was not made available to public, until a vinyl edition of this album was officially launched by Mondo on June 4, 2015. This edition had two additional tracks released for public distribution, along with the original album.

Track listing
No.	Title	Length
1.	"Title"	0:13
2.	"David"	1:50
3.	"Some Gave All"	0:58
4.	"The Guest"	1:40
5.	"After School"	2:34
6.	"Bar Fight"	1:30
7.	"Day Break"	0:13
8.	"KPG / The Deal, Pt 1"	3:13
9.	"The Deal, Pt 2"	0:47
10.	"The Guest Lurks"	0:20
11.	"Good Luck / Anna & Luke"	2:10
12.	"An Interesting Theory"	2:06
13.	"Carver Arrives"	0:46
14.	"Standoff / Too Many Complications / The Guest Escapes"	4:40
15.	"He's Not Who You Think He Is / The Diner"	2:32
16.	"Back to School"	1:02
17.	"Atmospheres 1"	4:56
18.	"Atmospheres 2"	2:40
19.	"Unused Chase Theme"	4:14
Total length:		38:47

== The Guest 2 (Original Soundtrack) ==
The sequel for The Guest was never produced, but a soundtrack album was released on April 1, 2022 (coinciding with April Fools' Day) by Lakeshore Records. The album was exclusively made available to digital music platforms on the day of its release, featuring two original score cues produced by Steve Moore, the film's composer. The title track of the film as well as the album artwork designed for the soundtrack, implies that the plot for the film revolves around "the guest" David (Stevens) goes against a cult group. Other artists involve, Ogre, Majure, John Bergin, Xander Harris and Wingard, the first film director, himself contributing to the album.

Moore had discussed about the music for the unproduced sequel, in an interview to Empire: "For The Guest 2 I revisited some of the main themes I wrote for the original film. The idea was that this would have been a bigger production, bigger budget, so I've tried to expand on these themes in a way that gives them a larger scope. Lots of synths but also a heavy orchestral component, and new motifs that layer over the original themes."

Track listing
No.	Title	Artist(s)	Length
1.	"Ident / Swerve and Steer"	Ogre	2:54
2.	"The Guest Returns"	Steve Moore	4:35
3.	"Love, Extended"	Majeure	4:31
4.	"Old Habits"	Makeup and Vanity Set	4:08
5.	"Hardwired"	Jordan F	4:30
6.	"Just Run"	Ghost Cop	5:13
7.	"Grim Showdown"	Adam Wingard	2:52
8.	"Carver's War Machine"	John Bergin	4:56
9.	"The Core of the Night"	Ainoma	3:53
10.	"You've Got The Armory, I've Got The Time"	Xander Harris	3:31
11.	"Heatflow"	Lone Runner	3:53
12.	"David vs. The Splinters of the Cross"	Steve Moore	4:20
Total length:			49:21
