= Spirit animal =

Spirit animal may refer to:

== Spirituality ==
- Familiar, a supernatural entity, interdimensional being, or spiritual guardian that protects or assists witches and cunning folk in their practice of magic, divination, and spiritual insight
- Power animal, a neo shamanic belief of a tutelary spirit
- Spirit guide, an entity that remains as a discarnate spirit to act as a guide or protector to a living incarnated individual
- Totem, a spirit being, sacred object, or symbol that serves as an emblem of a group of people, such as a family, clan, lineage, or tribe

== Music ==
- Spirit Animal (band), an American rock band
- Spirit Animal, a 2009 album by Zombi
- "Spirit Animal" (song), a 2016 song by Kerli

== Other uses ==
- Spirit Animals, a novel series by Brandon Mull

== See also ==
- Animal spirits (disambiguation)
