= Surface to air =

Surface-to-air can refer to:

- Surface to Air, fashion apparel
- Surface to Air Studio, creative agency
- Surface-to-air missile or Surface-to-air artillery
- Fulton surface-to-air recovery system
- Surface to Air, a 2006 rock album by Zombi
