= Cosmos (Zombi album) =

Studio album by Zombi
- Released: August 3, 2004
- Recorded: November 2003 at El Studio (drums, percussion) and Nightmare City Studios (bass, synths), Pittsburgh, Pennsylvania
- Genre: Progressive electronic; space rock; synthwave; neo-prog
- Length: 46:32
- Label: Relapse
- Producer: Zombi

Zombi chronology
Cosmos (2004)	Surface to Air (2006)

Professional ratings
Review scores
Source	Rating
AllMusic	3.5/5 stars

Cosmos is the first full-length record released by Zombi. All songs were written by both members of the duo, except "Cassiopeia" and "Andromeda" which were written and performed by bassist-keyboard player Steve Moore.

== Track listing ==
- All Songs Written by Zombi, except where noted.

Cosmos track listing
No.	Title	Length
1.	"Orion"	2:50
2.	"Cetus"	4:02
3.	"Cassiopeia" (Steve Moore)	2:57
4.	"Serpens"	9:39
5.	"Gemini"	11:06
6.	"Andromeda" (Moore)	2:13
7.	"Taurus"	13:44

== Personnel ==
- Steve Moore: Fender Bass, Korg Polysix, SCI Prophet 600, SCI Pro One, Roland Juno 106
- A.E. Paterra: Drums, Percussion, Cymbals, Moog Source, SCI Six Trak

== Production ==
- Arranged & Produced By Zombi
- Recorded, Engineered & Mixed By Steve Moore
- Mastered By Scott Hull (Pig Destroyer) at Visceral Sound
