= New Image College =

Private art school in Vancouver, Canada

Coordinates: 49°17′03″N 123°06′44″W

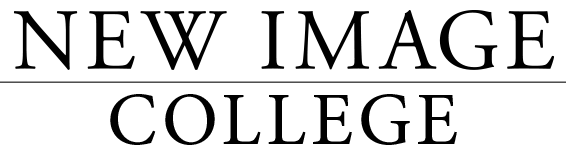

Location
- Student Campus: 987 Granville St. Corporate Offices: 543 Granville St. Vancouver, BC; Canada

Information
- Type: Private
- Motto: "Our Graduates Work"
- Established: 1980
- President: Charie Van Dyke
- Campus type: Urban Campus
- Website: www.newimage.ca

New Image College (commonly abbreviated as NIC) is a PTIB-accredited private academy for film acting, makeup artistry, aesthetics, hairdressing, and nail design located in downtown Vancouver, British Columbia. New Image College consists of two locations: their main student campus is located at Granville and Nelson and their corporate offices at Granville and Pender.

New Image College is EQA-designated by the BC Ministry of Education, and a Designated Learning Institution with CIC.

New Image College is a branch of the multimedia and venture capitalist corporation Global Model and Talent Inc., which is a multi-faceted organization comprising New Image Entertainment, LD Vacations, ShyDaTry Service and Product Inc., Phrike Film Festival, NIC Spa Inc. and other numerous ventures.

== History ==
New Image College was founded in 1980 by the Canadian husband and wife team Bill and Charlotte Dyck. Both trained extensively as clinical marriage and family physiologists, with years of philanthropy work within BC and around the world, specifically in India and China. The pair conceived New Image with the goal of providing an opportunity for abused women to develop a "new image" for themselves.

Initially focusing on fashion design, etiquette courses, and self-confidence seminars the business was expanded when it was taken over by their daughter, Charie Van Dyke.

Under the guidance of New Image College President Van Dyke and her husband, Vice President John Craig, the business would develop into one of the most respected and successful private academies in Canada, boasting over 25,000 alumni.

As of 2016, New Image has expanded even further after acquiring their 'Creative Arts Campus' on the corner of Granville and Nelson.

New Image College recently rebranded itself with the name "NIC" alongside the launch of its NIC Spa line. The NIC Spa on Granville, a private branch of Global Model & Talent, provides opportunities for alumni of New Image College's aesthetics program to begin their small businesses through the college's Entrepreneurial Program.

== New Image Entertainment ==
New Image Entertainment is an independent film production company located in Vancouver, British Columbia, Canada. New Image Entertainment is a subsidiary of New Image College, originally developed to produce short-length and feature-length films, utilizing the talents of their parent student body.

New Image Entertainment has produced over 100 independent productions, including the features Star Vehicle, which has been released internationally on DVD, Famine, and Bad Building.

== See also ==
- Higher education in British Columbia
