= Daniel Lomas =

Daniel Lomas may refer to:

- Daniel Lomas, actor in Torched (film)
- Daniel Lomas, character in Silk (TV series)
- Daniel Lomas, vocalist in Nazxul
