= New Image =

New Image may refer to:

- New Image, album by Jackie DeShannon
- New Image College of Fine Arts British Columbia, New Image has expanded into independent filmmaking under the banner of production
- New Image Entertainment, under New Image College of Fine Arts British Columbia,
- New Image Art
