= Gutterball =

Gutterball may refer to:

- "Gutterball", phrase used in American ten-pin bowling
- Gutterballs (film), 2008 Canadian slasher film
- Gutterballs, the name of a "film within a film" dream sequence in The Big Lebowski
- "Gutter Ball," television series episode of General Hospital: Night Shift
- Gutterball, 1990s band featuring Steve Wynn
- Gutterball 3D, Gutterball 2, Gutterball: Golden Pin Bowling, and Gutterball 3: World Champion video (bowling) games released by Skunk Studios, between 2002 and 2024.
