= Disciples (film) =

2014 film by Joe Hollow

- Film poster
- Directed by: Joe Hollow
- Written by: Joe Hollow
- Produced by: Joe Hollow; Wolfgang Meyer
- Starring: Tom Lodewyck; Tony Todd; Angus Scrimm; Linnea Quigley; Brinke Stevens; Debra Lamb; Bill Moseley; Barbara Magnolfi; Debbie Rochon; Camden Toy
- Cinematography: Wolfgang Meyer
- Edited by: Joe Hollow
- Music by: Harry Manfredini
- Production companies: Hollow Films; Primal Motion Pictures
- Distributed by: ITN Distribution
- Release date: September 12, 2014
- Running time: 90 minutes
- Country: United States
- Language: English

Disciples is a 2014 American horror film written, directed, produced, and edited by Joe Hollow. It stars an ensemble cast consisting of Tom Lodewyck, Tony Todd, Angus Scrimm, Linnea Quigley, Brinke Stevens, Debra Lamb, Bill Moseley, Barbara Magnolfi, Debbie Rochon, and Camden Toy. It tells the story of a group of humans and demons who must band together to fight for the fate of humanity.

== Plot ==
A dark twisted apocalyptic shocker about a group of humans and demons who must band together to fight for the fate of humanity. When an ancient prophecy unleashes an evil spirit, hell is brought upon the world.

== Cast ==
- Tom Lodewyck as The Priest – Asmodeus
- Tony Todd as Duncan – Belial
- Linnea Quigley as Raine – The Seraph
- Angus Scrimm as Winston – Azazel
- Debra Lamb as Marishka – Astarte
- Brinke Stevens as Tatiana – Agrat-Bat-Mahlat
- Barbara Magnolfi as Serena Cuzzoni
- Chris Burchette as The Father
- Bill Moseley as Dread
- Debbie Rochon as Elizabeth – The Watcher
- Kaylee Williams as Kelly
- Nick Principe as Friedrich – Astaroth
- Camden Toy as The Watcher – Servant
- Shannon Lark as Victoria
- Matt Ukena as Nick
- Morgan Peter Brown as Father Thomas
- Tim J. Hays as Rainier – Paimon
- Rachel Grubb as The Mother
- Tawny Amber Young as Sister Faith
- Paula Duerksen as Rachel
- Sabrina Bosler as The Succubus

== Release ==
In March 2014, it was announced that ITN Distribution acquired worldwide distribution rights to Disciples. The film was released direct-to-video on September 12, 2014.
