= Charie Van Dyke =

Canadian actor and model

- Born: December 10, 1965 (age 60); Winnipeg, Manitoba
- Occupations: Producer, CEO at New Image College of Fine Arts, Entrepreneur
- Years active: 1980–present

Charie Van Dyke (born December 10, 1965) is a former actor and model, the current president and co-owner of New Image College of Fine Arts, and a producer, known for The Clean-Up (2014), Famine (2011), and Star Vehicle (film) (2010).

== Personal life ==
Van Dyke was born in Winnipeg, Manitoba. At a young age, she followed her parents, Charlotte and Bill, to Los Angeles, California, where she continued her high school education. During this time, she was an avid athlete and became an All-American in track and field. After high school, she developed her interest and love for modelling and acting, which allowed her to travel across the world. In her mid-twenties, she settled back down in Vancouver and took over her parents business.

== Career ==
Van Dyke was a model when her parents, both psychologists, started New Image College of Fine Arts, back then known as New Image Enterprises, in 1980. At that time, New Image was a school for self-improvement. In 1988, Van Dyke took over when her mother left to care for her father after he suffered a debilitating injury. Under her ownership, the school was changed, restructured and made it into a school where acting programs, professional makeup, and professional skin care were taught. Soon after, Van Dyke met her husband and the current co-owner of New Image, John Craig. Together, in 2004, the two went through accreditation and moved the school to their current Downtown Vancouver location. As their college grew larger, Van Dyke, with the help of her husband, founded New Image Entertainment in order to create more opportunities for the graduates of their college. Recently, in 2014, New Image Entertainment, under the leadership of John Craig, was hired by an outside source for a professional production, not connected to the college.

== Filmography ==
Year	Title	Role	Notes
2008	Behind the Roses	Executive producer	Short film
2008	Bite Me?	Executive producer	Short Film
2008	The Tour	Executive producer	Short Film
2008	Asura	Executive producer	Short Film
2008	Black Harvest	Executive producer	Short Film
2008	Hotel	Executive producer	Short Film
2008	A Kind of Magik	Executive producer	Short Film
2008	Bikini Madness	Executive producer	Short Film
2008	Unknown & Forgotten	Executive producer	Short Film
2008	Lit Up	Executive producer	Short Film
2008	Stones in a Cathouse	Executive producer	Short Film
2008	Jessie's Back	Executive producer	Short film
2008	Hospital	Executive producer	Short Film
2008	The Abused	Executive producer	Short Film
2008	Betrayal	Executive producer	Short Film
2009	Seeds	Executive producer	Short Film
2009	The Arrival	Executive producer	Short Film
2009	Conversations of a Different Kind	Executive producer	Short Film
2009	Street Life	Executive producer	Short Film
2009	Robot	Executive producer	Short Film
2009	Homewreckers	Executive producer	Short Film
2009	Bush Party	Executive producer	Short Film
2009	Cumberdale	Executive producer	Short Film
2009	I Saw You	Executive producer	Short Film
2009	Together We're Heavy	Producer	Feature Film
2009	Suicide Club	Executive producer	Short Film
2009	Experience Hope	Executive producer	Short Film
2009	Stuck	Executive producer	Short Film
2009	Speed Dating	Executive producer	Short Film
2009	Detention	Executive producer	Short Film
2010	Camp Goodtimes	Executive producer	Short Film
2010	Brainstorm	Executive producer	Short Film
2010	Commentary	Executive producer	Short Film
2010	Star Vehicle (film)	Executive producer	Feature Film
2010	21/12/12	Executive producer	Short Film
2010	Forever Hold Your Piece	Executive producer	Short Film
2010	Dead Vampires	Executive producer	Short Film
2010	A Forest	Executive producer	Short Film
2010	Wave	Producer	Feature Film
2010	The Rock In the Box	Executive producer	Short Film
2010	The Pearly Gates	Executive producer	Short Film
2010	All In Two Days	Executive producer	Short Film
2011	Dinner at Goldies	Executive producer	Short Film
2011	Who Killed Pirate?	Executive producer	Short Film
2011	Semantics	Executive producer	Short Film
2011	The Sessions	Executive producer	Short Film
2011	The End	Executive producer	Short Film
2011	Geofinger	Executive producer	Short Film
2011	Foreclosed	Executive producer	Short Film
2011	Exile	Executive producer	Short Film
2011	Deep Inside You	Executive producer	Short Film
2011	Analyze What?	Producer	Feature Film
2011	Famine	Executive producer	Feature Film
2011	Food	Executive producer	Short Film
2012	Kids Dot World	Executive producer	Short Film
2012	Nuked	Executive producer	TV mini-series
2012	Disorderly Conduct	Executive producer	Short Film
2013	Two Sweet Hairdos	Executive producer	Short Film
2013	The Sun Should Doubt	Executive producer	Short Film
2013	The Redemptus Files	Executive producer	TV series
2013	Sh!t Talker	Executive producer	Short Film
2013	A Very Bad Night	Executive producer	Short Film
2013	Angels Among Us	Executive producer	Short Film
2014	Alarming	Executive producer	Video
2014	America's Most Hunted	Executive producer	Short Film
2014	The Motel Room	Producer	Short Film
2014	Creatura	Executive producer	Short Film
2014	The Clean-Up	Executive producer	Post-Production
2014	The Privileged	Executive producer	Post-Production
2014	The Cargo	Executive producer	Post-Production
2014	Cannibal Lipstick	Executive producer	Post-Production
2014	A Safe Place	Executive producer	Post-Production
