= Star Vehicle (film) =

Star Vehicle / Bleading Lady
- German DVD cover
- Directed by: Ryan Nicholson
- Written by: Ryan Nicholson
- Produced by: Michelle Grady; Ryan Nicholson
- Starring: Dan Ellis; Sindy Faraguna; Nathan Durec
- Cinematography: Jay Gavin
- Music by: Gianni Rossi
- Production companies: Plotdigger Films; New Image Entertainment
- Release date: June 1, 2010
- Running time: 75 minutes
- Country: Canada
- Language: English

Star Vehicle (re-titled in North America as Bleading Lady) is a 2010 horror film written and directed by Ryan Nicholson and starring Dan Ellis, Sindy Faraguna, Nathan Durec and Nick Windebank.

== Premise ==
The film tells the tale of frustrated Teamster driver Don Cardini, abused by spoiled stars and arrogant students, who becomes a ticking time-bomb of revenge. As Don goes on the rampage, his favourite scream queen, Riversa Red, finds herself up for a new role in the greatest gorefest of all: real life.

== Cast ==
- Dan Ellis as Don/The Driver
- Sindy Faraguna as Riversa Red
- Nathan Durec as Luke
- Erendira Farga as Sienna
- Kris Michaleski as Jordan
- Mike Li as Frank
- Paige Farbacher as Jenny
- Ady Mejia as Deb
- Gary Starkell as The Squatter
- Joshua Garcia as The Grip
- Jason Hermandez as The Gaffer
- Evanghelia Katsiris as The First A.D.
- Dave Thompson as The D.O.P.
- Matt Janega as the Brother/Stalker
- Ronny Monahan as Thomas
- Rachelle George as Chris
- Jarod Joseph as Jodi
- Babak Salimy as Rick
- Rochelle Jones as The Producer
- Paul Baynton as The Masked Psycho
- Francisco Cano as The Mullet Dude
- Guy Russell as Guy The Owner
- Tina Baloochestany as Danielle
- Randy Jones as Randy

== Production ==
Ryan Nicholson produced Star Vehicle / Bleading Lady via Plotdigger Films company. Michelle Grady and Nicholson produce the flick for New Image Entertainment.

== Soundtrack ==
Zombi's Steve Moore scored the soundtrack for the film under the pseudonym Gianni Rossi. This is the second Moore soundtrack for a Nicholson film, the first being Gutterballs.

== Release ==
Star Vehicle was released in censored form in Europe in the fall of 2010. An uncut North American release under the title Bleading Lady is scheduled for March 2011.
