= Live Feed =

2006 Canadian horror film by Ryan Nicholson

- DVD released by MTI Home Video
- Directed by: Ryan Nicholson
- Written by: Roy Nicholson; Ryan Nicholson
- Produced by: Ryan Nicholson
- Starring: Kevan Ohtsji; Taayla Markell; Stephen Chang
- Cinematography: Sasha Popove
- Edited by: Vince D'Amato
- Music by: Patrick Coble
- Distributed by: Creepy Six Films; Plotdigger Films
- Release date: 26 September 2006
- Running time: 81 minutes
- Country: Canada
- Languages: Cantonese; English

Live Feed is a 2006 horror film directed by Ryan Nicholson and starring Kevan Ohtsji, Taayla Markell and Stephen Chang.

== Plot ==
The movie tells the story of five friends, two couples (Emily, Darren, Sarah and Mike) and a single girl (Ashley) who are having a vacation in China. Along their trip they meet a Japanese cop (Miles), who was a spy working for the mafia, at a local bar owned by the same mafia. By misfortune, they stumble across the mafia boss and spill some beer on him, this causes him to grow remorse towards the travelers. Once they leave the bar they stop at a porn cinema, this time being the Main hideout of the mafia, and pay for private rooms without knowing that they were being sold as cannon fodder.

Emily and the movie theater owner accompany Sarah and Mike to a room where the walls are painted in blood and, upon leaving them, the owner locks them inside without any means of escape.

In the meantime, Ashley is trying to go to the theater's bathroom. Being grossed out by it, she panics, not knowing that Darren was with her in the bathroom. Eventually they got involved in a sexual intercourse, as is the case of Sarah and Mike.

Emily finds out about Darren's infidelity causing him to break his ankle and Ashley leaving. During this time the mafia boss comes to the theater and awaits for their execution, capturing Ashley first and locking Emily after. On the other hand, the movie's executioner arrives at Mike's room just right after noticing that the room has a drainer filled with blood and guts. The executioner beheads Mike and constraints Emily while some mafia workers put a rope around Ashley to constraint her and take her to the same room.

Miles, worried about Emily, attempts to enter the theater but fails to do so. Miraculously, Darren manages to escape the theater from the back entrance, allowing Miles to go inside and start to rescue the rest of Darren's Friends.

After entering the theater, Darren helps Miles with the rescue, first going after the cook, who was cooking the beheaded body of Mike, and later after the mafia boss. On an attempt to torture Emily, the executioner breaks through the door of the room where Emily was hiding, they try to make her eat poop but fights back and manages to get a gun that uses to make her path through the first floor of the theater. Soon after, an old man finds Emily and convinces her to give him the gun without knowing that he paid the mafia for her. After Miles and Darren take out the chef they head towards the main theater where the boss is. After some confrontations against each other, the boss kills the old man but the executioner finds out about it and decides to kill the boss. Miles, on the other hand, takes out the rest of the mafia crew.

After pretty much everyone died, Miles and Emily manage to survive and get in contact with the police, to their misfortune the theater owner kills Miles right before he could leave, leaving only Emily and Darren alive.

== Cast ==
- Kevan Ohtsji - Miles
- Taayla Markell - Emily
- Stephen Chang - The Boss
- Colin Foo - Shards
- Greg Chan - The Butcher
- Rob Scattergood - Darren
