= Goodnight Burbank =

Television series

- Created by: Hayden Black
- Written by: Hayden Black
- Directed by: Canyon Prince; Tracie Laymon
- Starring: Hayden Black; Laura Silverman; Dominic Monaghan; Miracle Laurie; America Young; Hadeel Sittu; Camden Toy; Cameron Bender; Diahnna Nicole Baxter; Adrienne Wilkinson; Parvesh Cheena; Fran Kranz; Jim Rash
- Composer: Hayden Black
- Country of origin: United States
- No. of episodes: 6

Production
- Editors: Adam Winfrey; Dana Jones; Josh Carrillo; Nathan Babian; Jim Barrett
- Running time: Half-hour

Original release
- Release: April 25, 2011

Goodnight Burbank debuted on the web as a "webisodic" series in March 2006. In April 2011, it was rebooted with a new cast, new look and new feel as a "webcom".

== Synopsis ==
The series is about a fictional Burbank, CA 10:00PM newscast and its crew.

== Cast ==
The original cast included members of the Upright Citizen's Brigade, The Second City, and Improv Olympic. The new half-hour version is still written by creator/producer Hayden Black and stars Laura Silverman, Dominic Monaghan, Miracle Laurie, Camden Toy and Black. It has featured, amongst others, John Barrowman, Adrienne Wilkinson, Jim Rash, Juliet Landau, and Parvesh Cheena.

== History ==
In August 2011, The Hollywood Reporter broke the news that Goodnight Burbank had been sold to Mark Cuban's HDNet. The deal came to be after Cuban reached out to Hayden Black, less than twenty-four hours after the first episode had aired on Hulu. The cable television channel aired the first season of Goodnight Burbank beginning on October 12, 2011.

== Reception ==
The original short-form version of the series received positive reviews from USA Today, which called it "better than 99% of the stuff on TV" and BBC News, which said it was a "brilliant satire that wouldn't look out of place on a network" - as well as G4, the San Francisco Chronicle and various websites. In 2006, it won vloggie for Best Web News Series. In 2007, it was awarded an Official Honoree by the Webbys.

The original series was named one of iTunes best podcasts of 2006 and 2007, in both People's Choice and Staff Picks categories. It was also nominated for Best Comedy Webby in 2008.

Goodnight Burbank made IMDb's Top 50 TV series to premiere in 2011.
