= ChromeSkull: Laid to Rest 2 =

- Film poster
- Directed by: Robert Green Hall
- Screenplay by: Robert Hall; Kevin Bocarde
- Produced by: Chang Tseng; Stephen Niver; Kevin Bocarde
- Starring: Nick Principe; Thomas Dekker; Mimi Michaels; Danielle Harris; Owain Yeoman; Brian Austin Green
- Cinematography: Amanda Treyz
- Edited by: Robert Hall; Thomas A. Krueger
- Music by: Leon Bradford; Lance Warlock
- Production company: Dry County Films
- Distributed by: Image Entertainment
- Release date: August 25, 2011 (DedFest)
- Running time: 93 minutes
- Country: United States
- Language: English

ChromeSkull: Laid to Rest 2 is a 2011 American slasher film written and directed by Robert Green Hall, and co-written by Kevin Bocarde. It is the sequel to 2009 film Laid to Rest.

== Plot ==
The minions of serial killer Jesse "ChromeSkull" Cromeans locate their employer and bring him back from the brink of death, though the injuries he sustained have left him disfigured. As ChromeSkull recuperates, tended to by an assistant named Spann, his disgruntled second-in-command, Preston, tracks Princess and Tommy, the survivors of the previous film, to a motel. Preston kills Princess, which infuriates ChromeSkull, while Tommy is spared, due to being out at the time of Preston's attack.

Three months later, as Preston (who has become severely disillusioned with ChromeSkull's leadership) searches for Tommy, Spann works on usurping his position in the organization by brownnosing ChromeSkull, selecting a new victim for him (a waitress named Jessica, who is legally blind) and setting up a hideout in an electroplating company. ChromeSkull breaks into Jess's house, kills the girl's visiting friend, and captures her. The police glimpse ChromeSkull on a video Jess was shooting, and bring Tommy into the station to re-interview him, unknowingly saving him from Preston, who had snuck into Tommy's apartment while dressed as ChromeSkull, and murdered Tommy's roommate.

Jess awakens in a coffin in the factory, where Preston taunts her, and orders two workers to create a new weapon. Following a lead, the police send a detective to the factory, and she becomes the test subject for Preston's new weapon, a spring-loaded knife with six blades. Preston then abducts Tommy, leaves him with Jess, and is informed that he has been fired by ChromeSkull, who is aware that Preston has been copycatting and undermining him. The enraged Preston alters his appearance to resemble ChromeSkull (who is on his way to the factory) while Tommy and Jess escape their bonds, and a pair of detectives search for their colleague who had earlier been dispatched to the building.

ChromeSkull and Preston kill the detectives, then fight each other, with ChromeSkull coming out victorious when he decapitates Preston. ChromeSkull takes Preston's weapon, incapacitates Jess and Tommy, and attacks an investigating detective, along with a group of officers. ChromeSkull returns to Jess, but she fights him off long enough for the wounded detective to recover, and shoot the killer. The FBI arrives, takes Jess to a hospital, and tells the detective that they will be taking over his investigation. ChromeSkull escapes the factory, and is next shown in Hollywood conversing with Spann, who assures him that they will find Jess.

In a post-credits scene, the FBI is shown questioning ChromeSkull's pregnant wife, who is unaware of her husband's crimes, convinced that his long absences are due to his job. After the truth is revealed to her, the horrified Mrs. Cromeans grabs an agent's gun, and shoots herself in the mouth.

== Cast ==
- Thomas Dekker as Tommy
- Brian Austin Green as Preston
- Mimi Michaels as Jessica Cannon
- Owain Yeoman as Detective King
- Danielle Harris as Spann
- Gail O'Grady as Nancy Cannon
- Johnathon Schaech as Agent Sells
- Nick Principe as ChromeSkull / Jesse Cromeans
- Christopher Allen Nelson as Detective Max
- Angelina Armani as Detective Holland
- Brett Wagner as Detective Tiny
- Allison Kyler as The Girl / Princess Gemstone
- Aimee-Lynn Chadwick as Allie
- Chris Cornel as Detective Trost
- Camden Toy as Dr. Kerr
- Jade Ramsey / Nikita Ramsey as Laurie
- Steve Rizzo as Officer Knight
- Ky Evans as Officer Fraser
- Alex Jovica as Officer Cochern
- Brianne Davis as Mrs. Cromeans
- Julia Lea Wolov as Female FBI Agent

== Release ==
The film was released Direct-to-Video on DVD and Blu-ray by Image Entertainment on Sep 20, 2011 which included Rated and Unrated versions of the film. It was also released in Canada by E1 Entertainment that same day.

== Reception ==
Steve Barton of Dread Central gave the film a 4.5 out of 5, and opined that it is "quite possibly be the most gut-wrenchingly violent slasher film of all time" and "an uncompromising, unflinching, and thoroughly insane little film which will have you gasping and cheering every kill until the very last frame". Conversely, Matt Serafini of the same website gave ChromeSkull a 2.5, and said that while the gore was brutal and it attempted to do unique and unexpected things, the film suffered from bad and convoluted writing, and was "silly, incoherent and completely over-the-top". In a review for DVD Verdict, David Johnson found that while ChromeSkull "doesn't quite measure up to the impact of the original" it was still a slick film with an interesting mythology for its killer, and gory kills that were inventive, unsettling, and off-putting. ChromeSkull was deemed a "pretty entertaining" film with "wildly creative, and brutal scenes of carnage" by Bloody Disgusting's Shawn Savage.
