= Xander Harris (musician) =

- Birth name: Justin Sweatt
- Born: Austin, Texas
- Genres: Electronic; dance; Italo disco
- Occupation: record producer
- Years active: 2000s-present
- Labels: Not Not Fun; Dark Action

Justin Sweatt, known under the alias Xander Harris, is an American electronic musician. Hailing from Austin, Texas, his musical style incorporates elements of darkwave, Italo disco and the soundtracks of 1980s horror films. As explained by Tiny Mix Tapes, Harris creates music with an entirely digital setup consisting largely synthesisers, sequencers and laptop. The pseudonym Xander Harris is named for a character from television series Buffy the Vampire Slayer. Andrew Ryce of Resident Advisor wrote in 2013 how Harris' music, along with that of Steve Moore, represented the growing appearance of new age elements in electronic dance music, describing Harris' work as an example "of this kind of trance-not-trance".

He had been involved with shoegaze and noise acts since the 2000s. His debut album Urban Gothic (2011) drew praise from Fact, who named it one of the year's best albums, and Bloody Disgusting. Reviewing the track "Vultures of Tenderness" (2013) for Pitchfork, Larry Fitzmaurice praised how the track "[opens] with a cavernous boom-beat rhythm as it eventually hits a steady 4/4 groove, accumulating electronic detritus along the way as arpeggiated synths drop in menacingly." He released the double A-side single "Cry Havoc"/"Heaven Birth" on Mogwai's label Rock Action in 2014; the former song was praised by The Quietus for being a "fine retro-futuristic drum machine pounder, which slowly immerses itself in a pool of lapping analogue synth waves." In 2017, he supported Mogwai in New York.

The album California Chrome (2016) continued the horror soundtrack motif was praised by The Line of Best Fit, who praised how "[i]n Xander Harris' musical metropolis, you may never find what it is you're afraid to face", and AllMusic's Paul Simpson, who noted how Harris' music avoids novelty status. It was also reviewed positively by Mojo, The Wire, and more lukewarmly by Uncut and Record Collector. Harris recorded the album in a home studio.

In 2016, Harris wrote an article for Clash Music describing and promoting Autisn's growing music scene. However, also around this period, he criticised local audiences, describing them as an "entitled tech bro playground", which drew attention from Vice.

== Discography ==
- Urban Gothic (2011)
- Chrysalid (2012)
- Poison Belt (2012)
- Snow Crash (2012)
- The New Dark Age of Love (2013)
- California Chrome (2016)
- Termination Dust (2017)
- Villains of Romance (2018)
