= Tracie Laymon =

American actress and director

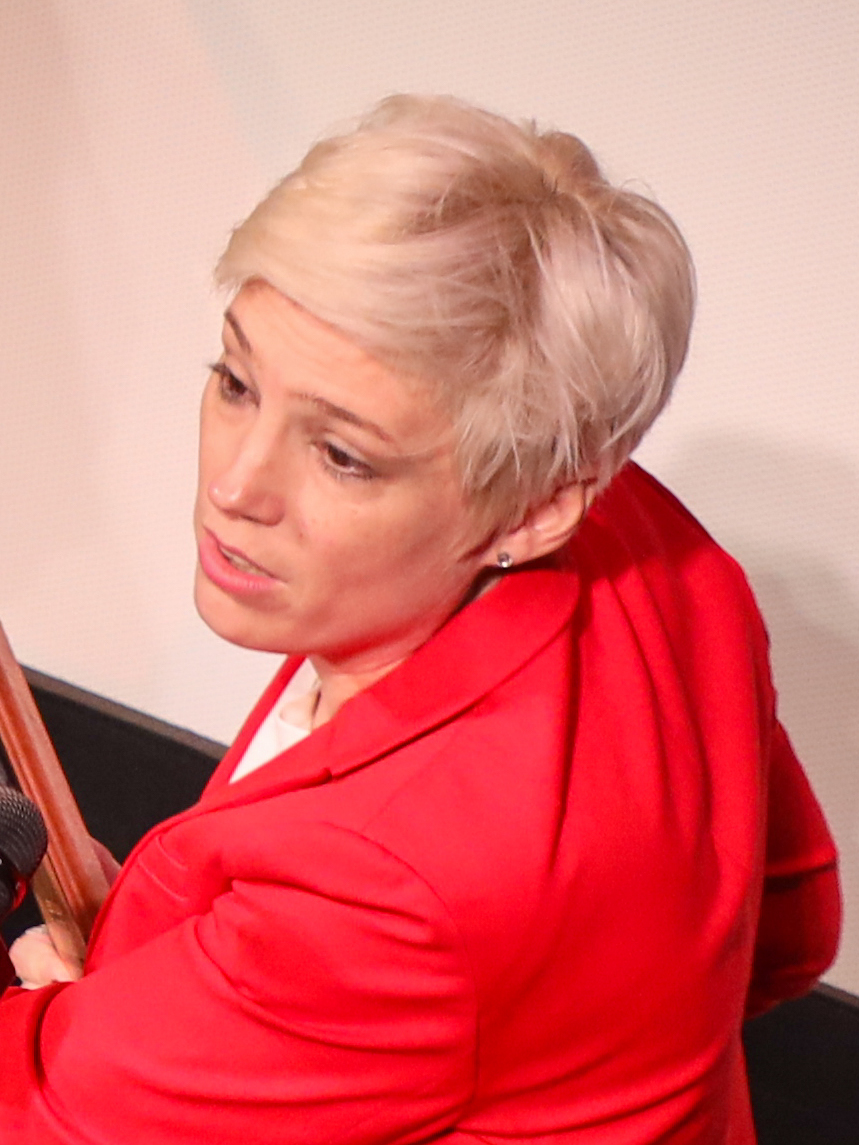
- Laymon in 2024
- Born: Houston, Texas
- Occupations: Film director, screenwriter, and producer
- Website: http://www.tracielaymon.com/

Tracie Laymon is an American screenwriter, producer, and film director. Raised in Houston, Texas, she studied film at the University of Texas at Austin. Laymon began her film career in Texas, where she created music videos and short films recognized at various film festivals.

She directed Goodnight Burbank, recognized as the first half-hour comedy series for the internet, which premiered on Hulu in April 2011 and was acquired by Mark Cuban for HDNet later that year. Her short film A Hidden Agender premiered at the Dallas International Film Festival and won the Jury Award for Best Dark Comedy at WorldFest Houston.

Laymon was later named to the Independent Film Channel's list of emerging "Icons" and "Film Innovators." She has worked on various projects, including a segment of the women’s anthology film Girls!Girls!Girls!, which starred Elaine Hendrix and Octavia Spencer. Her scripted material has received multiple accolades, including Best Screenplay at the LA Comedy Festival and Best TV Pilot at HollyShorts.

Her 2018 short film Mixed Signals premiered at the Oscar-qualifying LA Shorts Fest and won several awards for Best Director at various festivals. Laymon has also directed a proof-of-concept pilot for Tess Allen's Matched and served as an observing director on Showtime's Shameless. She has taught both animation and live-action filmmaking at organizations like Ghetto Film School and on Stanford and Berkeley campuses.

Her short film Ghosted received multiple awards in 2020 and 2021, including Best Director at the Big Bear Film Summit, Big Sur International Short Film Screening Series, Method Fest and Women Texas Film Festival as well as Best Short Film, Best Director and Best Writer at the Seattle Film Festival. The film also won the top prize, the "Superstar" award, at LA Under the Stars festival.

== Career ==
=== Texas ===
Laymon was born and raised in Houston, Texas. She pursued film studies at the University of Texas at Austin. In 2004, she received recognition for her early directorial work on the music video "better?" for the group 54 Seconds, which won the SXSW Jury Award that same year. She spent time in Austin, Texas, creating short films and worked on the production staff of The Real World: Austin.

=== California ===
Laymon worked as a production assistant on the 2007 film Blades of Glory and served as office manager for the 2008 film U2 3D. By 2009, she was based in Los Angeles as a filmmaker. In May 2009, her music video "Falling From Mars," featuring musician Alyssa Campbell, won the Music Video Award at the on Location: Memphis International Film Festival. Laymon directed the short film Inside, which premiered at the Milan International Film Festival in May 2009 and was nominated for Best Short Film at the festival. Additionally, she was featured as part of the Independent Film Channel's "IFC Icons," highlighting her contributions to film and video.

== Filmography ==
| Year | Film | Role |
|---|---|---|
| 2009 | Inside | Director, Producer, Writer |
| 2011 | Girls! Girls! Girls! | Director, Writer |
| 2011 | A Hidden Agender | Director, Writer |
| 2011 | Goodnight Burbank | Director, Writer (uncredited) |
| 2018 | Mixed Signals | Director, Producer, Writer |
| 2020 | Ghosted | Director, Producer, Writer |
| 2024 | Bob Trevino Likes It | Director, Producer, Writer |

== Awards and nominations ==
| Year | Award | Project | Category | Result |
|---|---|---|---|---|
| 2004 | SXSW Film Festival | better? | Best Music Video | Won |
| 2008 | Las Vegas International Film Festival | Falling From Mars | Golden Aces Award | Won |
| 2008 | On Location: Memphis International Film Fest | Falling From Mars | Best Music Video | Won |
| 2008 | The Feel Good Film Festival | Falling From Mars | Best Music Video | Won |
| 2009 | Milan International Film Festival Awards | Inside | Best Short Film | Nominated |
| 2009 | Fantastic Fest | Inside | Official Selection | Selected |
| 2009 | Women's Image Network (WIN) Awards | Inside | Best Short Film | Won |
| 2011 | Dallas International Film Festival | Girls! Girls! Girls! (Segment: A Hidden Agender) | Official Selection | Selected |
| 2011 | San Diego Film Festival | Girls! Girls! Girls! (Segment: A Hidden Agender) | Best Feature Film | Nominated |
| 2011 | Twin Cities Film Festival | Girls! Girls! Girls! (Segment: A Hidden Agender) | Official Selection | Selected |
| 2011 | Carmel Art and Film Festival | Girls! Girls! Girls! (Segment: A Hidden Agender) | Official Selection | Selected |
| 2011 | Beverly Hills Short Film Festival | Girls! Girls! Girls! (Segment: A Hidden Agender) | Best Short Film | Selected |
| 2011 | LA Comedy Festival | Girls! Girls! Girls! (Segment: A Hidden Agender) | Official Selection and Best Actress | Nominated |
| 2011 | Louisville International Film Festival | Girls! Girls! Girls! (Segment: A Hidden Agender) | Official Selection | Selected |
| 2011 | La Femme Beverly Hills | Girls! Girls! Girls! (Segment: A Hidden Agender) | Best Producers | Won |
| 2012 | Houston International Film Festival | Girls! Girls! Girls! (Segment: A Hidden Agender) | Best Dark Comedy | Won |
| 2013 | LA Comedy Festival | One Small Step for Neil | Best Screenplay | Won |
| 2018 | Catalina Film Festival | Mixed Signals | Best Short | Nominated |
| 2018 | LA Femme International Film Festival | Mixed Signals | Best Short | Nominated |
| 2018 | LA Shorts International Film Festival | Mixed Signals | Best Short Film | Nominated |
| 2018 | Louisville's International Festival of Film | Mixed Signals | Jury Award | Nominated |
| 2018 | Portland Film Festival, US | Mixed Signals | Best Short Film | Nominated |
| 2018 | Women Texas Film Festival | Mixed Signals | Best Director | Won |
| 2019 | Independent Shorts Award | Mixed Signals | Best Director (Female) | Won |
| 2019 | Method Fest | Mixed Signals | Best Director | Won |
| 2019 | LA Under the Stars Film Festival | Mixed Signals | Best Writer | Won |
| 2021 | Catalina Film Festival | Saturday Night Lesbian | Best Feature Screenplay | 1st Place |
| 2021 | Big Bear Film Summit | Ghosted | Best Director | Won |
| 2021 | Big Bear Film Summit | Ghosted | Best Narrative Short Film | Won |
| 2021 | Big Sur International Short Film Screening Series | Ghosted | Best Director | Won |
| 2021 | LA Shorts International Film Festival | Ghosted | Best Short Film | Nominated |
| 2021 | Los Angeles Shorts & Script Festival | Ghosted | Best of Festival | Won |
| 2021 | Hollywood Gold Awards | Ghosted | Best Director | Won |
| 2021 | Flickers' Rhode Island International Film Festival | Ghosted | Best Short Film | Nominated |
| 2021 | Portland Film Festival | Ghosted | Best Short Film | Nominated |
| 2021 | San Diego International Film Festival | Ghosted | Best Short Film | Nominated |
| 2021 | Seattle Film Festival | Ghosted | Best Short | Won |
| 2021 | Seattle Film Festival | Ghosted | Best Director | Won |
| 2021 | Seattle Film Festival | Ghosted | Best Writer | Won |
| 2021 | Women Texas Film Festival | Ghosted | Best Director | Won |
| 2021 | Women Texas Film Festival | Ghosted | Storyteller Award | Won |
| 2021 | Yucca Valley Film Festival | Ghosted | Best Short Film | Won |
| 2022 | LA Under the Stars Film Festival | Ghosted | Superstar (Best Rated Film) | Won |
| 2024 | SXSW Film Festival | Bob Trevino Likes It | Narrative Feature | Won |
| 2024 | San Diego Film Festival | Bob Trevino Likes It | Narrative Feature | Won |
| 2024 | San Diego Film Festival | Bob Trevino Likes It | Narrative Feature | Won |
| 2024 | Hamptons International Film Festival | Bob Trevino Likes It | Narrative Feature | Won |
| 2024 | New Hampshire International Film Festival | Bob Trevino Likes It | Narrative Feature | Won |
| 2024 | Nashville Film Festival | Bob Trevino Likes It | Narrative Feature | Won |
| 2024 | Newport Beach Film Festival | Bob Trevino Likes It | Best Actor (John Leguizamo) | Won |
| 2024 | Rome International Film Festival | Bob Trevino Likes It | Narrative Feature | Won |
| 2024 | Rome International Film Festival | Bob Trevino Likes It | Best Actress (Barbie Ferreira) | Won |
| 2024 | Rome International Film Festival | Bob Trevino Likes It | Best Support Actor (French Stewart) | Won |
| 2024 | Tallgrass Film Festival | Bob Trevino Likes It | Narrative Feature | Won |
| 2024 | Denver Film Festival | Bob Trevino Likes It | Narrative Feature (Audience Award) | Won |
| 2024 | Virginia Film Festival | Bob Trevino Likes It | Narrative Feature (Audience Award) | Won |
| 2024 | Anchorage International Film Festival | Bob Trevino Likes It | Best Director | Won |
| 2024 | Anchorage International Film Festival | Bob Trevino Likes It | Narrative Feature | Won |
| 2025 | Dublin International Film Festival | Bob Trevino Likes It | Best Screenplay | Won |
| 2025 | Houston Latino Film Festival | Bob Trevino Likes It | Audience Award for Best Narrative Feature | Won |
| 2025 | Imagen Awards | Bob Trevino Likes It | Best Feature Film | Won |
| 2025 | The Astra Awards | Bob Trevino Likes It | Indie Spotlight Award | Won |

== See also ==
- List of film and television directors
- Music video director
