= Bergen Williams =

American actress (1959–2021)

- Born: Laura Lynn Williams; July 14, 1959; Inglewood, California, U.S.
- Died: July 20, 2021 (aged 62); San Francisco, California, U.S.
- Occupation: Actress
- Years active: 1990–2015

Laura Lynn "Bergen" Williams (July 14, 1959 – July 20, 2021) was an American actress. She is best known for her role as Alice Gunderson, the maid for the Quartermaine family, in the ABC daytime soap opera, General Hospital.

Williams was born in Inglewood, California. In early 1990s, she began her acting career, appearing in small roles on television and films. She guest starred on NYPD Blue, Nurses,The Drew Carey Show, Scrubs. She also was a writer and story editor for Power Rangers Wild Force.

Bergen Williams died from Wilson's disease on July 20, 2021, six days after her 62nd birthday, as reported by her family on November 16, 2021.

== Filmography ==
- Mom and Dad Save the World (1992)
- Wishman (1992)
- Younger and Younger (1993)
- Clifford (1994)
- Lord of Illusions (1995)
- Without Charlie (2001)
- Go for Broke (2002)
- Woman Thou Art Loosed (2004)
- The Incredible Dyke (2007)
- Killer Pad (2008)
- Venus & Vegas (2010)
