= Urban Gothic (album) =

Studio album by Xander Harris
- Released: April 5, 2011
- Genres: Electronic body music; grave wave; italo disco; nu-disco; industrial; synthwave; spacesynth
- Length: 40:48
- Label: Not Not Fun
- Producer: Justin Sweatt

Xander Harris chronology
Contamination (2011)	Urban Gothic (2011)	Snow Crash (2012)

Ultimate Edition

Urban Gothic is the debut studio album by Xander Harris, a synthesizer music project of American musician Justin Sweatt. Sweatt, having occasionally synthesizers when he first worked in psychedelic rock and noise music bands, was influenced to start a synthesizer music project by his friend Isobelle. The album's feel is inspired by the Brian Keene novel of the same name. The album was well-received by music journalists and landed on numerous publications' year-end lists, such as at number 50 on Fact's list of the 50 best releases of 2011.

== Background ==
Justin Sweatt began his career working in psychedelic rock and noise music acts; he occasionally made tracks using synthesizers during this period, but he never had the time to make the "kind of synthesizer music that [he] had always heard in [his] head." This was until his friend Isobelle, who enjoyed and was excited with his synthesizer work, encouraged him to go further with making music using synthesizers. This, as well as his stress, boredom, and frustration in trying to make sounds out of electric guitars and noise, inspired him to create an album using the synthesizer, an instrument that had a "calming effect" on him. Thus, he formed the project named Xander Harris, naming it after the character from the television series Buffy the Vampire Slayer. His reasoning for the name was, "I liked the way it sounded more than my own name plus I thought it was a great way to pay tribute to my total geek-dom."

== Production and composition ==
The entirety of Urban Gothic was produced in sessions of Logic Pro. The drums were recorded live with Roland drum machines instead of sequencers to give the songs a "loose vibe." The lead melodies on the album were performed by sounds programmed with the Realistic Concertmate MG-1 and microKORG. Sounds programmed with the Roland XP-10, the Alesis QS-6 and Native Instruments plug-ins can also be heard on the album. For making Urban Gothic, he was influenced by the works of Skinny Puppy, Depeche Mode, Wolfgang Riechmann, Tangerine Dream, John Carpenter, Cabaret Voltaire, Claudio Simonetti, and Wendy Carlos, as well as soundtracks for Italian post-apocalypse films and the album The Space Between (1980) by Chris Carter.

During the creation of the record, Sweatt discovered the works of the author Brian Keene and was amazed by his novel Urban Gothic. He said that the book had a "quality to it that can be so brutal but kind of unnervingly poignant at the same time." Sweatt then re-recorded and re-edited the tracks that had already been finished for the album and added samples of dialogue from news reports about serial killers for the songs to match the concepts and feel of the book. The samples were recorded onto and pitch-shifted with a Roland SP-303 digital sampler.

Fact magazine's Kiran Sande wrote that Urban Gothic stands out from most 1970s/1980s horror film soundtrack throwback records in that it "isn’t trying to be basic, it really is basic"; this is mainly due to Sweatt's performance of the synthesizers sounding "wonderfully underbaked," and this makes the listener feel as if he is "delighting himself" with the limited technology and skills he has. The record also departs from similar LPs in that it sounds very high quality; in fact, writer Guy Frowny compared it to Bottin's album Horror Disco (2009), where it uses the same atmosphere and hi-fi sounds.

== Concept ==
Frowny described Urban Gothic as a kitschy view of a teenager's fear of the gothic and horror images that they imagine; the album brings the theme together by combining the tongue-in-cheek styles of films like The Return of the Living Dead (1985) and Once Bitten (1985) with the serious yet artificial horror aspect of Tenebrae (1982) and Cate People (1982). As Frowny analyzed:

We see in their contemporary audi-recreation the recombination of the sonic aesthetics of the unimaginable exterior (‘space’) with visions of the visceral interior made manifest through the frame of the wound (and this perhaps reflects a tendency to extremity and bodily degradation evident in other aspects of popular culture, particularly pornography). Given that Keene’s novel is essentially a splatter-update on the haunted house genre, this (literally) incisive revelation of the horrific lying beneath the banal seems fitting.

Urban Gothic is a soundtrack to an imaginary film, as indicated by the song titles "Opening Credits" and "End Credits." Frowny noted a parallel of the album's film soundtrack concept with the rise of actual modern 1980s-influenced horror films in terms of "abscene" of a justification for them to exist. He analyzes that 1980s horror throwback movies are "so incredibly terrifying that they cannot actually ever come into existence, but remain disembodied presences." Similarly, there are "two-minute vignettes that might be perfect for, say, a street stalking scene" that "feel like they need developing into something richer and deeper, something employing the structural manipulation of elements characteristic of long-form dance music." This leads the record to showcase "the fantasy of the fantasy of" the violent nature of the films, as well as a utopian dynamic regarding the house setting of the album.

== Release ==
Professional ratings
Review scores
Source	Rating
Fact	4/5
Tiny Mix Tapes	3.5/5 stars

The original 13-track set of Urban Gothic was released April 5, 2011. The "Ultimate Edition" of the LP was released on October 3, 2013, adding seven original tracks and a remix of the song "I Want More Than Just Blood" by High Heels. On May 7, 2013, Xander Harris self-released the extended play Basements on Bandcamp, consisting of B-sides produced during recording of Urban Gothic.

Bloody Disgusting critic Jonathan Barkan wrote that the record was a great listening experience when reading the novel it was inspired from at the same time, but listening to the album on its own would leave the listener feeling indifferent to and unimpressed with it due to the repetitive nature of the music: "Since this is meant to be background music while reading a book, it serves a great purpose in lulling the reader, almost hypnotically, into a state where reading is made almost effortless." Sande, reviewing for Fact, wrote that Urban Gothic, "despite revelling in the postlapsarian imagery of sex and ultraviolence, has a musical innocence that is rare, and very charming." It landed at the number 50 on the publication's list of the 50 best releases of 2011. In another retrospective list, self-titled magazine listed Urban Gothic on their "40 Records Worth Hearing Beyond Our Top 10 Lists," while in 2016, Bandcamp Daily recommend the record on their list titled "Synthwave Further Listening for Fans of “Stranger Things."

== Track listing ==
Urban Gothic – Standard version
No.	Title	Length
1.	"Opening Credits"	2:42
2.	"The House"	3:14
3.	"First Body"	1:53
4.	"Splatter in the Mouth"	2:44
5.	"Hatchet in the Teeth"	2:00
6.	"Tanned Skin Dress"	4:00
7.	"Hunting"	3:50
8.	"When The Hammer Starts To Swing"	4:32
9.	"Crying in the Dark"	1:56
10.	"Fucking Eat Your Face"	3:32
11.	"I Want More Than Just Blood"	3:48
12.	"Dreams After Death"	2:21
13.	"End Credits"	4:16
Total length:		40:48

Urban Gothic – Ultimate edition
No.	Title	Length
14.	"The Selection"	3:38
15.	"Dividing The Body"	2:28
16.	"Nowhere to Go"	2:59
17.	"Skinned in A Minor"	3:10
18.	"Redemption in Blood"	2:40
19.	"Anteroom"	10:02
20.	"The Piper of Soggoth"	3:58
21.	"I Want More Than Just Blood" (High Heels remix)	10:48
Total length:		1:20:31
