= Robert Green Hall =

American filmmaker and musician (1973–2021)

Robert Green Hall (November 27, 1973 – May 24, 2021) was an American special makeup effects artist, film director, musician, and owner of PostHuman FX, specializing in providing seamlessly integrated makeup and visual effects.

== Career ==
=== Make-up effects artist career ===
Born in Detroit, Michigan, Hall began his career as a youngster in Fairview, Alabama, buying makeup and materials at the local Wal-Mart for his friends' Halloween costumes.

In 1996, Hall set up his own studio and named the company after a title of a song by the rock group Kiss.

In the early stages of the company, Hall worked with extremely small budgets on 22 films for Roger Corman's Concorde - New Horizons and considered himself a graduate of the "Roger Corman School of Film".

Hall's creations have been featured on shows like Angel, Buffy the Vampire Slayer and Firefly and the movies Vacancy, Superbad, Strange Wilderness, Big Stan, Killer Pad, Fear Clinic, The Crazies and Quarantine 2.

=== Directorial career ===
In 2004, Hall marked his writing and directorial feature film debut with the semi-autobiographical drama, Lightning Bug. He has also directed the 2009 horror film Laid to Rest which stars Bobbi Sue Luther, Kevin Gage, and Sean Whalen.

Hall directed and was a consulting producer for the web series Fear Clinic starring Robert Englund.

Hall co-wrote and directed a sequel to his 2009 horror film, Laid to Rest titled, ChromeSkull: Laid to Rest 2, released September 2011.

== Personal life and death ==
Hall resided in Los Angeles. When not working he spent his time writing and recording music, playing bass in the band Zero 1 with Hal Sparks and he directed music videos for rock bands such as Buckcherry, Manntis, Kevn Kinney (Drivin N Cryin) and In This Moment. Hall died on May 24, 2021, at the age of 47.

He was married to pornographic actress, Angelina Armani, who also appeared in Fear Clinic as the character, Caylee, from 2011 until his death.
