= Madison County (film) =

- Directed by: Eric England
- Written by: Eric England
- Screenplay by: Eric England
- Story by: Agung Bagus; Zach Campbell
- Produced by: Daniel F. Dunn; Eric England; Ace Marrero
- Starring: Colley Bailey; Matt Mercer; Ace Marrero; Nick Principe; Megan Bell; Dayton Knoll
- Cinematography: David Starks
- Edited by: Levi Blue
- Music by: Igor Nemirovsky
- Production companies: Dunn-Rite Productions, Southern Fried Films, Swim with the Fish Productions
- Release date: October 17, 2011
- Running time: 91 minutes
- Country: United States
- Language: English

Madison County is a 2011 American slasher film written and directed by Eric England. The film was first released on October 17, 2011. It stars Colley Bailey, Matt Mercer, and Ace Marrero as a group of college kids out to interview an author of a true crime book, only to end up targeted by a killer.

== Plot ==
A woman named Kristen wakes up in the bed of a pickup truck and tries to escape, only to be knocked unconscious by the man driving it.

College students James and Will pick up Will's girlfriend Brooke and her friend Jenna, as well as Brooke's protective older brother Kyle. The group drives to Madison County, Arkansas, in order to meet David Randall, the author of a book based on a murderer named Damien Ewell. David has been in contact with James and has agreed to an interview for a class assignment. On the way, they meet a trucker who suggests a shortcut which they don't take.

Once they arrive in Madison County, they go to a diner and the locals rudely stare at them except for a seemingly kind old woman named Erma, who tells them Damien Ewell doesn't exist and David Randall moved years ago, but she does tell them David's old address. When they leave, Will is threatened by a local for unintentionally taking a picture of his truck; the local backs off when Kyle confronts him.

The group arrives at David's house and finds it is indeed empty. Kyle takes James' SUV back into town to talk to the locals while the others wait at the house. Kyle checks a graveyard and is lured into the woods by two nude women. Kyle catches up to the women, who skinny-dip in a lake; distracted, Kyle doesn't notice Damien Ewell sneak up on him and Damien stabs Kyle and throws his body into the lake.

James discovers a picture confirming the old woman, Erma, is Damien's mother so he walks back into town and on the way he is nearly run over by the hostile local who earlier threatened Will. Will and Brooke are hiking and split up; once alone, Will sees Kyle's body floating in a nearby river and shortly after Damien appears and kills Will, Brooke sees this and flees before Jenna finds her, but Damien chases after them. Jenna and Brooke try to hide from him until Jenna decides to distract him away from Brooke, and after a brief fight Jenna is killed.

James confronts Erma, who warns him that Damien will be coming for him soon. James leaves and the trucker from earlier, who told him about the shortcut, offers him a ride and tells James that he is David Randall. David drives James to Damien's house and knocks him out with a shovel.

James wakes up in a barn tied up along with David and his daughter, who is revealed to be Kristen. David says he was forced to lure James and his friends to Madison County in an attempt to save the kidnapped Kristen. Damien enters the barn and stabs David in the stomach but James manages to free himself and wound Damien. James, Kristen, and the wounded David leave the barn and try to leave in a truck, but Damien jumps into the bed of the truck and finishes off David, who had been lying there. James slams on the brakes and knocks Damien out of the truck's bed and after a brief fight, James and Kristen escape in the truck.

Brooke walks back into town and arrives at the diner where she tells Erma that someone killed her friends. Erma tells her to wait outside by her car. While Brooke stands by Erma's car, Erma sneaks up behind her and stabs her to death as locals watch from their homes.

== Cast ==
- Colley Bailey as James
- Ace Marrero as Kyle
- Natalie Scheetz as Jenna
- Matt Mercer as Will
- Joanna Sotomura as Brooke
- Katie Stegeman as Kristen
- Nick Principe as Damien Ewell
- Dayton Knoll as David Randall
- Adrienne Harrell as Erma Ewell

== Development ==
England based parts of the film on elements from his own childhood as well as stories that he "kind of dramatized to fit into a horror film". The film premiered at LA Screamfest.

== Reception ==
Critical reception for Madison County was predominantly negative. Shock Till You Drop and HorrorNews.net both panned the film, with both reviewers criticizing the film for its usage of cliches and "well worn formula[s]". In contrast, Dread Central and Fearnet gave more positive reviews, with Dread Central commenting that while "it certainly isn't a game-changing affair or anything", Madison County "should definitely prove to be an enjoyable experience for all the indie horror loving masses out there and makes for a fun little popcorn flick for the slasher film fans as well."
