= The Animal Spirits =

The Animal Spirits may refer to:

- The Animal Spirits (Slough Feg album), 2010
- The Animal Spirits (James Holden album), 2017

== See also ==
- Animal spirits (disambiguation)
