= Animal spirits =

Animal spirits or animal spirit may refer to:

- The spirits of animals in the belief system of animism
- Animal spirits (Keynes), the instincts, proclivities and emotions that seemingly influence human behavior, which can be measured in terms of consumer confidence
- Animal Spirits (book), a 2009 book by George Akerlof and Robert Shiller
- "Animal Spirit", a 2014 song by Bloom
- "Animal Spirits", a 2016 song by Vulfpeck

== See also ==
- Spirit animal (disambiguation)
- The Animal Spirits (disambiguation)
