= Famine (film) =

- DVD released by Shock Entertainment
- Directed by: Ryan Nicholson
- Written by: Jeff O'Brien; Ryan Nicholson
- Story by: Taylor Nicholson
- Produced by: John Craig; Philip Granger; Ryan Nicholson; Charie Van Dyke
- Starring: Des Larson; Beth Cantor; Sanya Silver; Karyn Halpin; Thabi Maphoso; Christine Wallace; Christopher Lomas; Gustavo MacSerna
- Cinematography: Matt Leaf
- Edited by: Matt Leaf
- Production companies: Plotdigger Films; New Image Entertainment
- Distributed by: Shock Entertainment
- Release date: October 6, 2011 (Dedfest Victoria)
- Running time: 77 minutes
- Country: Canada
- Language: English

Famine (also known as Stupid Teens Must Die! and Detention Night) is a 2011 Canadian horror film written and directed by Ryan Nicholson, and co-written by Jeff O'Brien.

== Plot ==
At Sloppy Secondary High School, new teacher Ms. Vickers has put together a 24 Hour Famine (volunteers stay in the school gym and starve themselves for a day) for charity, the first famine held since an incident occurred during the last one five years prior. Ten students (Cathy, Sarah, Darren, Nick, Terry, Vanessa, Andrea, Katie, Jenny and Peterson) sign-up for the event, wanting the extra credit. Vickers asks Jenny what happened at the last famine, and is told that rumor has it the organizer, Philip Balszack, was accidentally disfigured by acid when he tried to have sex with Cathy in the chemistry lab. Balszack disappeared, and Cathy was supposedly briefly institutionalized.

Before the famine begins, Katie hides food in one of the gym washrooms, and while doing so is confronted by someone wearing the costume of the school mascot, a carpenter called The Nailer. The Nailer throws a knife into Katie's forehead, and hides her body. Hours later, with the famine in full swing, The Nailer picks off straggling students. Terry has his throat slit while sabotaging food in the cafeteria, Peterson is impaled through the head while having sex with a Swiss Roll, and Vanessa is thrown onto the spike protruding from Peterson's head.

After she finds the Nazi principal dead, his eyes removed while he was watching gay porn, Jenny is kicked out, her claims disbelieved. Jenny reenters the building using keys she takes off the bodies of two teachers murdered in the parking lot, and discovers Darren's fried and severed head in the cafeteria freezer. Jenny rejoins Vickers and the remaining students in the gym, just as a distorted voice begins making threats over the PA system. Everyone except Cathy flee into the school, finding the dead body of Tim (the scarred janitor and prime suspect) in an office.

While Vickers goes back to get Cathy, the rest of the group try to break out, and as they are doing so a bloodied Cathy appears, claiming she stabbed Vickers in the gym when Vickers attacked her. Jenny and Nick go to the gym, where the latter is disemboweled by Vickers, as Cathy scalps Andrea. Vickers and Cathy go after Sarah, cornering her in a classroom, where they mutilate one of her breasts, and stab her to death.

Vickers and Cathy track down Jenny, who has armed herself with a nail gun. Vickers reveals she is Balszack, back for revenge after undergoing numerous recuperative surgeries and a sex change. Cathy then explains what really happened five years ago; most of the other participants in the current 24 Hour Famine told Cathy that Balszack liked her, and they dared her to seduce him, claiming that if Cathy did so they would be her friends. When Cathy tried to convince Balszack to have sex with her, he turned her down, and Cathy unintentionally shoved him into a shelf full of chemicals.

Vickers attacks Jenny, who fires a wild shot with the nail gun, grazing Vickers, and hitting Cathy in the head. Cathy collapses, followed by Vickers, who lands face first on Cathy's knife. Jenny exits the school, wielding the nail gun and wearing the head of The Nailer costume.

== Cast ==
- Beth Cantor as Cathy Carpenter
- Christine Wallace as Jenny Jameson
- Christopher Patrick Donoghue as Mr. Carpenter
- Nathan Durec as Philip Balszack
- Dustin Elkins as Mr. Spinell
- Karyn Halpin as Sarah Silvana
- Glenn Hoffmann as Principal Neilson
- Des Larson as Darren Dickerson
- Christopher Lomas as Nick Nelson
- Gustavo MacSerna as Terry Torres
- Thabi Maphoso as Vanessa Vandermeer
- Ady Mejia as Andrea
- Ryan Nicholson as The Nailer
- Terry Paugh as Tim
- Michelle Sabiene as Ms. Vickers
- Sanya Silver as Katie Carlyle
- Leo Wong as Peterson

== Soundtrack ==
- "Puke Rawk" performed by Fake Shark - Real Zombie!
- "Don't Forget" performed by Fake Shark - Real Zombie!
- "Gold Tooth on a Bum" performed by The Dillinger Escape Plan
- "Chasing the Dragon" performed by Enoch
- "Parasitic Twins" performed by The Dillinger Escape Plan

== Reception ==
Daniel King of Horror News wrote, "the language is industrial strength, the humour is puerile and the detail is frequently revolting. In an ultra-black comedy, which is essentially what Famine is, such qualities are priceless". In a review for Toronto Film Scene, William Brownridge said, "The gore is great, but that's not enough to really recommend this film".
