= Blood Valley: Seed's Revenge =

2014 film directed by Marcel Walz

- DVD cover
- Directed by: Marcel Walz
- Written by: Marcel Walz
- Produced by: Uwe Boll; Marcel Walz; Yazid Benfeghoul
- Starring: Manoush; Nick Principe; Sarah Hayden; Annika Strauss; Natalie Scheetz; Caroline Williams; Christa Campbell; Jared Demetri Luciano
- Cinematography: Wolfgang Meyer
- Edited by: Michael Gilmore
- Music by: Klaus Pfreundner
- Production company: Matador Film
- Distributed by: Boll World Sales
- Release date: 1 February 2014 (Splatterday Night Fever)
- Running time: 78 minutes
- Countries: Germany; United States
- Language: English

Blood Valley: Seed's Revenge (also known as Seed 2 and Seed 2: The New Breed) is a 2014 American horror film written and directed by Marcel Walz. It is the sequel to 2007's Seed. Blood Valley was produced by Uwe Boll, who wrote and directed the original film.

== Plot ==
Christine, who is about to be married, decides to hold her bachelorette party in Las Vegas with her friends Olivia, Claire, and Barbara. Christine's foster mother bids her farewell, then bludgeons a bound and gagged man with a hammer. After the party, Christine's group begins driving back to Chicago in an RV, and it is revealed that Christine has a troubled past and an unspecified mental illness, which has caused her to carve inverted crosses into her abdomen. During the trip, the quartet pick up a hitchhiker named Joe, who they quickly eject from the vehicle due to his strange behavior. A short time later, the RV is flagged down by a religious police officer, who claims that she needs a lift to the nearest town.

When the RV fails to start, the officer has Christine and Barbara stay behind while she, Olivia, and Claire go in search of aid. Once they are a considerable distance from the others, the officer begins acting deranged, stabs Claire, and shoots Olivia in the knee. She then has her son, Glen, help her move Claire. Nearby, serial killer Max Seed chases and murders a woman, and makes his way to the RV, where he incapacitates Christine and Barbara. After taking Olivia to the RV, Seed meets with the officer and Glen, who are his wife and son, respectively. Seed orders his family away, and nails Claire to the ground.

After the Seed clan leaves, Claire is found by Joe, who releases and tries to rape her, prompting Claire to stab him in the neck with one of the spikes she was crucified with. At the RV, Seed restrains Glen while the officer recites passages from the Bible, and stabs him. Seed reaches into Glen's wound, rips out his intestines, and strangles him to death with them.

Reentering the RV, Seed makes Barbara watch as he rapes and shoots Olivia with a handgun. When Seed leaves her alone, Barbara crawls out a window and tries to run away, but is shot to death by Christine, who refers to Seed's wife (revealed to be Emily Bishop, the child Seed abducted at the end of the previous film) as "mom". When Claire reaches the RV, Seed attacks her, but is stopped by Christine, who tells him, "No. With her I still have plans". As he and his family head home with the unconscious Claire, Seed snaps Emily's neck, and continues on with Christine and Claire.

In a mid-credits scene, a motorist stops when he sees Claire lying on the side of the road; he tries to call for help, but has his throat slit by Claire. Seed walks up to Claire, and gives her his mask, which Claire puts on.

== Cast ==
- Natalie Scheetz as Christine McDonagh
- Christa Campbell as Olivia
- Caroline Williams as Mrs. McDonagh
- Nick Principe as Maxwell Seed
- Annika Strauss as Claire
- Manoush as Officer Seed / Emily Bishop
- Sarah Hayden as Barbara
- Jared Demetri Luciano as Glen Seed
- Jeff Dylan Graham as Joe
- Ryan Nicholson as Man In Truck
- Micaela Schäfer as Victim

== Reception ==
Dread Central's Debi Moore, who awarded the film a 1½ out of 5, gave mild praise to Nick Principe's performance, but went on to write, "However, it's the lack of plot, completely inane acting, and terrible camera work that become the movie's worst enemy. If you're in the mood for nearly 80 minutes of useless hacking and slashing with no redeeming qualities, then settle in for Seed's Revenge. If not, then I suggest you leave this little nugget buried FAR beneath the soil". The film was similarly condemned by fellow Dread Central reviewer Foywonder, who gave Blood Valley: Seed's Revenge an even lower score of ½ out of 5, and opined that, "Nearly every minute of The Hills Have Seeds 76-minute run time is incoherent. Virtually no plot to speak of, gibberish dialogue you'll wish they didn't speak, long stretches of nothing happening, and most baffling of all, the film is edited in a non-linear fashion that only makes the experience even more tediously impenetrable. Maybe that was the point. Maybe the whole idea was to create a sadistic fever dream. Maybe the director was shooting for an avant-garde grindhouse vibe. The movie is most definitely a grind all right". Horror News had a mixed reaction Seed 2, and concluded, "As is, Seed 2 has some pretty nasty, gritty gore scenes, some brutal kills, some weird religious imagery, and a kind of cool twist, all put together in a nearly unwatchable way. The reason this makes me sad is that it is shot well, it's a cool idea, and if it had just been put together in a coherent, linear fashion, I think the boo-birds would have never picked on it. The technique of rearranging the timeline can work, as has been proven in numerous other films, but it is not employed correctly here. So I say, yes, see this movie, because it's still worth your time, but go in knowing that you may need to pause and regroup for a second, and not in that slick, intelligent kind of confusion, but rather in that 'did the editor screw up?' kind of confusion".
