= Hanger (film) =

- DVD released by Vicious Circle Films
- Directed by: Ryan Nicholson
- Written by: Patrick Coble; Ryan Nicholson
- Produced by: Patrick Coble; Wolfgang Hinz; Michelle Grady; Ryan Nicholson; Stephanie Jennings
- Starring: Dan Ellis; Wade Gibb; Debbie Rochon; Alastair Gamble; Candice Lewald; Nathan Dashwood; Ronald Patrick Thompson
- Cinematography: Jay Gavin
- Edited by: Jay Gavin
- Music by: Patrick Coble
- Production company: Plotdigger Films
- Distributed by: Vicious Circle Films
- Release date: November 17, 2009 (United States)
- Running time: 90 minutes
- Country: Canada
- Language: English

Hanger is a 2009 Canadian horror film directed by Ryan Nicholson and written by Nicholson with Patrick Coble. The film is banned in Australia.

== Plot ==
Unable to bring in any more money for Leroy, her abusive pimp, the pregnant Rose tries to run away in the middle of the night, but is caught by Leroy. Using a clothes hanger, Leroy performs an impromptu abortion on Rose, unintentionally killing her in the process. Leroy disposes of Rose's baby in a dumpster, where its cries attract the attention of a homeless man, who raises the disfigured child as "Hanger".

On his eighteenth birthday, the vagrant sends Hanger off to live with John, his biological father, who the man had earlier met at a junkyard. John informs Hanger that he has gotten him a job at the junkyard, and that he will be working there and living with Russell, an acquaintance with Down syndrome. As he drives away with Hanger, John runs over the homeless man (who was defecating in his tent) and joyously tells his long-lost son "Welcome to the rest of your life!" John gives Hanger a picture of Rose, and picks up a prostitute for him to have sex with, but upon seeing Hanger's mutilated face, the woman goes into hysterics, so John crushes her head in his truck door.

While Hanger is watching pornography with Russell in their home, a Jehovah's Witness visits, and Hanger mauls and partially eats her while being cheered on by Russell. Later, John drops by, and reveals to Hanger that he has a plan to get revenge on Leroy for what he did to Rose. On his way out, John is approached by Foxy White, Leroy's girlfriend, who offers to help John kill Leroy. John turns down Foxy's offer, but says he will make Leroy suffer "a little extra" if Foxy watches over Hanger.

While Hanger is at work, John is captured by Leroy and a prostitute named Trashy, who disfigure him with a blow torch, and a hanger. Foxy finds John and tries to release him, but Leroy walks in on this, and shoots Foxy in the head. As that occurs, Russell and Hanger are drugged by Phil, a co-worker, who rapes them while wearing a Santa suit; at one point, Phil inserts his penis into Hanger's leaking colostomy. Russell and Hanger get their revenge on Phil at the junkyard, knocking him out, and placing him under a pile of garbage. Russell goes home and drinks tea made from used tampons, but after getting a call from Hanger, Russell goes to the junkyard, and finds Nicole (the owner's daughter) unconscious in her office, Hanger having knocked her out with Phil's drugs.

Russell takes Nicole's tampon, and she is later found by Leroy, who rapes her while she is unconscious, and threatens her into luring away Russell so Leroy can be alone with Hanger. Once he is in Nicole's office, Russell is seemingly killed by Leroy, who chokes him with one of Nicole's tampons. Outside, Hanger stomps Phil's head in, and is confronted by Leroy, but John (who was left for dead, but recovered and killed Trashy by shoving a douche up her nose) appears and calls Leroy out. Leroy and John fatally shoot each other, and a distraught Hanger runs off with the hysterical Nicole.

== Cast ==
- Debbie Rochon as Rose Pedals
- Dan Ellis as The John
- Nathan Dashwood as Hanger
- Ronald Patrick Thompson as Leroy Washington
- Lloyd Kaufman as Melvina, The Tranny
- Wade Gibb as Russell
- Alastair Gamble as Phil
- Candice Lewald as Nicole
- Nadia Grey as "Smashy"
- Stephanie Walker as "Trashy"
- Randy Jones as The Foreman
- Rochelle Lynn-Jones as "Foxy" White
- Susan Arum as Jehovah Witless
- Wayne Phillips as Jamaica Man
- Michelle Grady as Trixie, The Mangled Whore
- Ryan Nicholson as The Bum
- Patrick Coble as Scrapyard Worker

== Release ==
Hanger was released Direct-to-Video by Breaking Glass Pictures on Nov 17, 2009.

== Reception ==
Film Bizarro found Hanger to be "a great entertaining trash-fest that has come the closest to being a true throwback to grindhouse cinema that any movie has so far" despite the ending feeling erratic and anticlimactic. A three and a half was awarded by Severed Cinema, which wrote that "Hanger is as entertaining as it is repulsive" and "the film is a fun campy horror comedy". Independent Flicks commended the camerawork, editing, gore, and Dan Ellis's performance, but gave a four and half out of seven after deeming the film "a bit too bizarre" and "something of a let down" due to the "cartoonish style" that lessened its impact.

A three out of five was awarded by Digital Retribution, which stated "Hanger is hard to rate because it sets out to offend and will probably do so for virtually everyone, but that doesn't make it good" and "I found Hanger's padding and surrealism distracting and a bit boring". The film was called "Nicholson's nastiest piece of work yet" by The Worldwide Celluloid Massacre, which deemed it "worthless" and one of the most "vile" films the website has covered.

== See also ==
- The Suckling, a similar film from 1990.
