= Laid to Rest =

- Film poster
- Directed by: Robert Green Hall
- Written by: Robert Green Hall
- Produced by: Chang Tseng; Bobbi Sue Luther; Ed Polgardy; Seth Negal
- Starring: Bobbi Sue Luther; Kevin Gage; Sean Whalen; Johnathon Schaech; Thomas Dekker; Nick Principe; Richard Lynch; Lena Headey
- Cinematography: Scott Winig
- Edited by: Andrew Bentler
- Production company: Dry County Films
- Distributed by: Anchor Bay Entertainment
- Release dates: March 18, 2009 (Dallas, Texas)
- Running time: 90 minutes
- Country: United States
- Language: English

Laid to Rest is a 2009 American slasher film written and directed by Robert Green Hall. It was followed by a 2011 sequel entitled ChromeSkull: Laid to Rest 2.

== Plot ==
A young woman with amnesia breaks out of a coffin in a funeral home, and dials 911 in the morgue, but accidentally unhooks the telephone while speaking to the operator. The mortician appears and is impaled by a man equipped with a chrome skull mask, and a shoulder-mounted camera. The girl stabs ChromeSkull in the eye, and runs off while he treats his wound. The girl is picked up by Tucker, who takes her home to his wife Cindy, and promises her that they will go to the sheriff's station in the morning, as Tucker's truck is low on gas, and their phone service has been cut off.

ChromeSkull tracks the girl (who has been nicknamed "Princess") to Tucker's house and kills Cindy. Tucker and Princess escape in Tucker's truck as ChromeSkull deals with Cindy's brother Johnny and his girlfriend, who had come by to check on Cindy. Tucker and Princess seek aid from a recluse named Steven, who uses his computer to email for help, and research ChromeSkull, discovering he is a serial killer whose modus operandi is to send tapes of himself murdering women to the authorities.

The trio goes to the police station and finds the sheriff and a deputy dead, and ChromeSkull waiting for them. The group wound ChromeSkull's leg and drove away, reaching the funeral home. Princess explores the area and discovers that a nearby barn contains several of ChromeSkull's previous victims. ChromeSkull beheads a still-living captive, knocks Princess out, and places her in a casket. Before ChromeSkull can kill Princess, he is shot by Tucker, who drives away with her and Steven in ChromeSkull's car.

Princess looks at footage on ChromeSkull's camera, which shows he was in league with the mortician, whom he killed due to the man becoming a liability. Princess takes the car while Tucker and Steven are removing bodies from the trunk, and is locked inside by ChromeSkull, who uses his cellphone to take control of the onboard computer as he follows Princess to a convenience store. Via paperwork in the car, Princess finds out ChromeSkull's name is Jesse Cromeans, right before he attacks her.

ChromeSkull prepares to kill Princess, but he is out of tapes for his camera, so he coerces her into going into the store to get one. The clerk sees the threatening messages ChromeSkull is sending Princess through a cellphone, goes out to confront him, and has his head blown off when ChromeSkull turns his own shotgun on him. A customer, Anthony, goes to lock the backdoor and is decapitated by ChromeSkull. Tucker and Steven reach the store, grab ChromeSkull's suitcase on the way in, and replace the glue he uses to keep his mask on with Cyanoacrylate. ChromeSkull cuts the power and causes Steven's face to explode by injecting canned tire inflator into his ear. Tucker is stabbed while trying to give Princess enough time to escape with Tommy, the murdered customer's friend.

ChromeSkull locks Tommy out of the building, and traps Princess in a freezer. To taunt Princess, ChromeSkull gives her his camera, which reveals she was a drug-using sex worker he had picked up, and that she lost her memory when ChromeSkull beat her with a bat. Princess smashes the camera in frustration, and while struggling with ChromeSkull, knocks his mask off. ChromeSkull goes to reaffix his mask, unknowingly using the Cyanoacrylate that Steven had replaced his adhesive with. The chemical melts ChromeSkull's face as he peels his mask off, and as he writhes in agony, Princess bludgeons him with an aluminum bat.

Princess finds her missing person notice (which Steven had printed off his computer) in Tucker's pocket, who dies of his injury and leaves with Tommy to Atlanta, after finding out that Anthony was murdered by ChromeSkull. The police arrive, and find the flyer, which Princess had written an explanation on the back of.

== Cast ==
- Bobbi Sue Luther as The Girl / Princess Gemstone
- Kevin Gage as Tucker Smith
- Sean Whalen as Steven
- Johnathon Schaech as Johnny
- Thomas Dekker as Tommy
- Nick Principe as ChromeSkull / Jesse Cromeans
- Jana Kramer as Jamie
- Lucas Till as Young Store Clerk
- Seraphine DeYoung as Bound Girl
- Anthony Fitzgerald as Anthony
- Richard Lynch as Mr. Jones
- Lena Headey as Cindy Smith

== Production ==
=== Filming locations ===
A majority of principal photography occurred in southern Maryland, notably the state-owned, abandoned Crownsville Hospital Center near Annapolis. The crew spent 24 days shooting in April and May 2008. While the above-the-line production team was based out of Los Angeles, a few department heads were locals to DC-Maryland-Virginia, as well as most of the crew. Lead actress/producer Bobbi Sue Luther is a native of the area, and was able to use personal connections to secure key locations. The production employed creative methods to save money; for instance, Chromeskull's on-camera vehicle was director Robert Hall's daytime rental car, and the VW Jetta that Princess rides off in at the finish was owned by the production designer.

=== Cinematography ===
Majority of the film was shot using a Panasonic AJ-HPX3000 1080p camera system.

== Release ==
Laid to Rest received a limited theatrical run in March 2009. It was released on home video on April 21, 2009.

== Reception ==
On the review aggregator website Rotten Tomatoes, 71% of 7 critics' reviews are positive.

Dread Central gave the film a four out of five, concluding "Laid to Rest does have some minor issues with pacing at first but really finds its stride about 30 minutes in and just keeps moving along until the very end. What I like here is that Hall was able to create a slasher film with characters we care about but definitely doesn't take anything too seriously either, giving horror fans a movie that's both entertaining and a lot of fun to watch". DVD Talk awarded three out of five, which said that while Laid to Rest "contrives a lot of convenient coincidences to keep the plot rolling" and was "admittedly lacking in logic" it was still "an entertaining 90 minute thrill ride".

DVD Verdict also responded well to Laid to Rest, writing that it was "an inventive, sick as all get out thrill-ride" and "an entertaining, engaging slasher movie". Scott Weinberg of Fearnet wrote, "Powerfully gory, peppered with unexpected doses of weird humor, and backed by a colorful cast of familiar faces, Rob Hall's Laid to Rest is hardly the most original or trail-blazing terror tale out there -- but it's an '80s-style throwback piece that gains a lot of mileage out of very little gas."

Bloody Disgusting gave a rating of 4.5 out of 5 and said the film "[...] goes above and beyond the call of duty in so many segments of its production value that it would be foolish not to see it as somewhat revolutionary."

IGN reviewed the DVD release and gave a rating of 8 out 10, concluding: "This DVD is a fantastic value, with its marginally high technical merits and the solid amount of quality extras. When held against other movies for the sheer merits of its filmmaking, no, this isn't a particularly good movie."

== Sequels ==
The film has been followed by a sequel titled ChromeSkull: Laid to Rest 2 and has an upcoming prequel in development.

A third film, Laid to Rest: Exhumed was due to start principal photography in December 2017 in northern Alabama. However in December 2020, Robert had started to make some finishing touches to the script but tragically died on May 24, 2021 mere months before he was to start filming in September (stated in a live he did on Facebook between December 2020 & May 2021). His mother has asked Brian Austin Green to help finish his work and stated he would, but as of August 2023, no mention has come about since.
