= Bobbi Sue Luther =

American actress

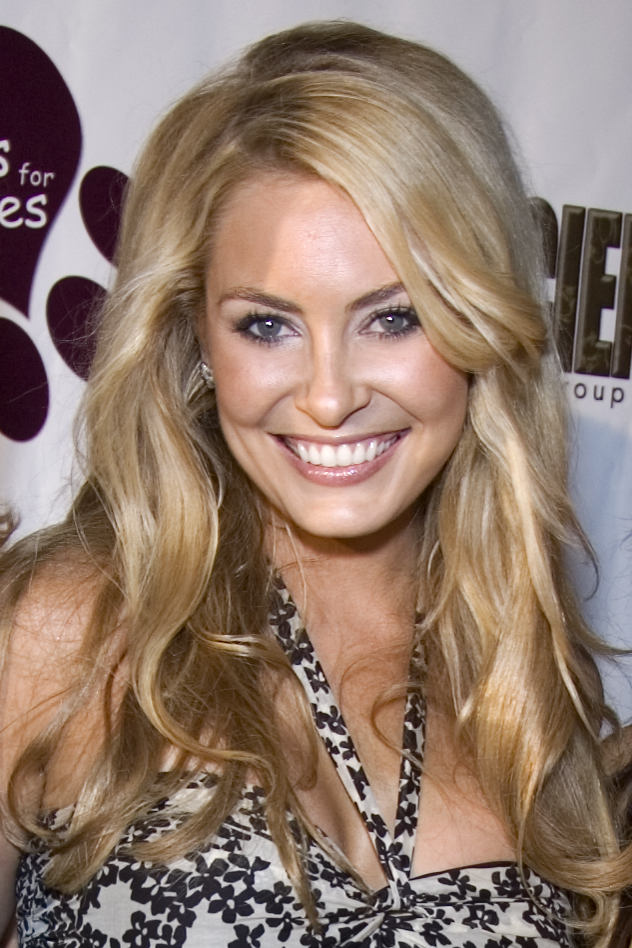
- Luther in 2007
- Born: August 27, 1978 (age 48); Annapolis, Maryland, U.S.
- Other name: Bobby Sue Luther
- Occupations: Actress; Film producer Television host Model
- Years active: 1998–present
- Spouse(s): Robert Green Hall (?-2010); Scott Wing (2016-present)

Bobbi Sue Luther (born August, 27, 1978) is an American actress, producer, television host and model. She is best known as a film producer and for her role as the co-host of TLC's Junkyard Mega Wars.

== Career ==
Early in her career Luther worked as a model, co-hosting TLC's Junkyard Mega Wars. In 2004, she was selected to advance to the final 28 auditionees for WWE's reality television competition, the WWE Diva Search, but she was not chosen as one of the final 10 contestants. She has been featured in, and on the cover of, numerous different magazines she was the face of St. Pauli Girl beer in 2007, and she was a spokeswoman for Axe body spray.

Luther began her acting career in the early 2000s. Her first notable role was as a Orion slave girl on Star Trek: Enterprise, she went on to appear in episodes of Curb Your Enthusiasm and Terminator: The Sarah Connor Chronicles. She began acting in films with her first notable film role being a newscaster in Deuce Bigalow: European Gigolo. She predominately acted in horror films, appearing in; The Poughkeepsie Tapes, Laid to Rest, Night of the Demons and Aftermath.

She began producing films in 2009, with her first credit being on Laid to Rest. She has produced many other film and television series for various different networks, being nominated for an Emmy Award in 2021.

== Personal life ==
She was briefly rumored to be romantically linked to actor Brian Austin Green in 2009. She was married to American film director Robert Green Hall they divorced in 2010, she married her current husband Scott Wing in 2016.

Luther, in partnership with Jennifer Reuting, co-founded Cuties for Canines. A non-profit foundation, a privately funded organization which relies on volunteer workers and donations in order to rescue dogs from animal shelters and place them in homes.

== Filmography ==
Film credits
Year	Title	Role	Notes
2003	Dude... We're Going to Rio	Airline attendant	
2004	Boy-Next-Door	Kennedy	Short film
2004	The Dana & Julia Show	Waitress	Television film
2005	Come as you Are	Amber	
2005	Deuce Bigalow: European Gigolo	Newscaster	
2007	Gameface	Tabitha	
2007	The Poughkeepsie Tapes	Josephine	
2008	Killer Pad	Amber Waves	
2008	Extreme Movie	Gabriela	
2009	The Slammin' Salmon	Cod customer #1	
2009	Laid to Rest	The girl	
2009	Night of the Demons	Suzanne	
2010	Made in Romania	Bambi Kleist	
2011	Judy Moody and the Not Bummer Summer	Young woman	
2013	Crazy Kind of Love	Bartender	
2014	Aftermath	Basement refugee	
2020	Happy Horror Days	Party guest	

Producer credits
Year	Title	Credit	Notes
2009	Laid to Rest	Producer	Film
2009	Fear Clinic	Producer	Television series, 5 episodes
2010	The Somnambulist	Producer	Film
2010	Amongst Brothers	Executive producer	Short film
2010	The Psycho Legacy	Special thanks	Film
2011	Judy Moody and the Not Bummer Summer	Executive producer	Film
2012	Paranormal Abduction	Co-producer	Film
2013	Crazy Kind of Love	Producer	Film
2013	Fractured	Special thanks	Film
2013	Dom Hemingway	Special thanks	Film
2014	Aftermath	Line producer	Film
2014	Unsullied	Co-producer	Film
2014	Prey	Co-producer	Film
2014	ABCs of Death 2	Producer	Film
2015	Walter	Post-production supervisor	Film
2015	Waiting	Assistant director	Short film
2015	The Boy	Line producer	Film
2015	Primrose Lane	Producer	Short film
2015	Wasted Beauty	Producer	Short film
2017	The Last Movie Star	Executive producer	Film
2017	Nostalgia	Co-producer	Film
2019	The Devil Has a Name	Executive producer	Film
2019	Miss Virginia	Line producer	Film
2020-2022	Sherman's Showcase	Producer	Television series, 7 episodes
2020	Sylvie's Love	Executive producer	Film
2020	Arkansas	Special thanks	Film
2021	Paradise City	Producer	Television series, 8 episodes
2021-2022	The Game	Line producer	Television series, 10 episodes

Television as actress
Year	Title	Role	Notes
2004	Star Trek: Enterprise	Orion slave woman	1 episode ("Borderland")
2005	Curb Your Enthusiasm	Playmate	1 episode ("The Smoking Jacket")
2008	Terminator: The Sarah Connor Chronicles	Bar skank	1 episode ("Goodbye To All That")
2012	Dark Wings	The girl	1 episode ("Chrome")

Television as self
Year	Title	Role	Notes
2003-2004	Junkyard Mega Wars	Herself; co-host	Recurring role
2004	WWE RAW Diva Search Casting Special	Herself; contestant	Television special
2004	Bikini Destinations	Herself; model	2 episodes
2005	Poorman's Bikini Beach	Herself; co-host	2 episodes
2009	Up Close with Carrie Keagan	Herself; guest	1 episode
