= Surface to Air =

Studio album by Zombi
- Released: May 2, 2006
- Genre: Progressive electronic; space rock
- Length: 44:23
- Label: Relapse
- Producer: Zombi

Zombi chronology
Cosmos (2004)	Surface to Air (2006)	Spirit Animal (2009)

Professional ratings
Review scores
Source	Rating
AllMusic	3.5/5 stars
Stylus Magazine	B−

Surface To Air is the second full-length album by Zombi. It was released in the United States by Relapse Records on May 2, 2006. The first vinyl edition was released through Belgian record label Hypertension Records in 2006. The second vinyl edition was published by Norman Records in the United Kingdom in 2014.

== Track list ==
- All Songs Written & Arranged by Zombi.

Surface to Air track listing
No.	Title	Length
1.	"Challenger Deep"	4:29
2.	"Digitalis"	4:39
3.	"Legacy"	9:01
4.	"Surface to Air"	7:38
5.	"Night Rhythms"	18:35

== Production ==
- Produced by Zombi
- Recorded, mixed and mastered by Steve Moore

== Musicians ==
- Steve Moore – bass, synthesizers, keyboards
- A.E. Paterra – drums, percussion, synthesizers
