= Collar (film) =

- Directed by: Ryan Nicholson
- Written by: Ryan Nicholson
- Production company: Plotdigger Films
- Distributed by: Unearthed Films
- Release date: March 15, 2014
- Running time: 89 minutes
- Country: Canada
- Language: English

Collar is a 2014 Canadian horror film directed by Ryan Nicholson. The film follows two young men who, while filming amateur fight videos and other lurid activities on the streets, stumble across a deranged criminal known only as "Massive", who rapes and kills his way through the city as the sociopathic amateur filmmakers film him and a female rookie cop attempts to stop him.

Before the movie release in 2014 its director Ryan Nicholson said in conversation with Tony Vilgotsky from DarkCity magazine that Collar can be compared to one of his previous movies, Gutterballs in a level of sexual violence, but will be more spectacular in part of depiction of the cruelty.
