= Ryan Nicholson =

Canadian special effects artist (1971–2019)

- Born: 1971; Victoria, British Columbia, Canada
- Died: October 8, 2019 (aged 47); Vancouver, British Columbia, Canada
- Occupations: Special effects makeup artist, filmmaker
- Years active: 1995–2019
- Spouse: Megan Nicholson (m.?–2019; his death)
- Awards: Gemini Award: Best Achievement in Makeup in Andromeda
- Website: plotdigger.com

Ryan Nicholson (1971 – October 8, 2019) was a Canadian special effects makeup artist and filmmaker.

== Biography ==
Nicholson was born in 1971 in Victoria, British Columbia. He was a self-taught artist who ran special-effects shop Flesh & Fantasy for a number of years before he began directing and producing his own independent films through his production company Plotdigger Films.

He was married to Megan Nicholson and had one son.

=== Television ===
Nicholson worked in the makeup department on many television shows including The X-Files, The Outer Limits, Stargate and Andromeda for which he was nominated for the Gemini Award three times for Best Achievement in Make-Up, with a win in 2002.

=== Film ===
Nicholson contributed to Scary Movie and Final Destination films, in addition to Elf, Blade: Trinity and The Chronicles of Riddick.

Nicholson also wrote, produced, and directed several films under the banner of his production company Plotdigger Films, including Torched, Gutterballs, Live Feed, Hanger, Nature and others.

=== Death ===
Nicholson died from brain cancer on October 8, 2019.

== Filmography ==
| Year | Film | Functioned as | | | | | Notes |
| Year | Film | Director | Writer | Producer | Actor | Role | Notes |
|---|---|---|---|---|---|---|---|
| 2004 | Torched | Yes | Yes | Yes | | | Short |
| 2004 | Necrophagia: Nightmare Scenarios | Yes | | | Yes | Psychotic Boyfriend | |
| 2006 | Live Feed | Yes | Yes | Yes | | | |
| 2008 | Gutterballs | Yes | Yes | Yes | Yes | BBK | |
| 2009 | La Petite Mort | | | | | | Presenter |
| 2009 | Hanger | Yes | Yes | Yes | Yes | The Bum | |
| 2010 | Star Vehicle | Yes | Yes | Yes | | | |
| 2011 | Suffer | | Yes | | | | Short |
| 2012 | Famine | Yes | Yes | Yes | Yes | The Nailer | |
| 2012 | My Name Is 'A' by Anonymous | | | Yes | | | |
| 2012 | Blood Valley: Seed's Revenge | | | | Yes | Man in Truck | |
| 2014 | Collar | Yes | Yes | Yes | Yes | Bum Fighter 1 | |
| 2015 | Gutterballs 2 | Yes | Yes | Yes | Yes | | Post-humous release via Unearthed Films |
