= Spirit Animal =

Studio album by Zombi
- Released: 2009
- Recorded: 2008
- Genre: Progressive electronic; space rock; progressive rock; instrumental rock
- Length: 57:48
- Label: Relapse Records
- Producer: Zombi

Zombi chronology
Surface to Air (2006)	Spirit Animal (2009)	Split EP with Maserati (2009)

Professional ratings
Review scores
Source	Rating
AllMusic	4/5 stars
Mind Inversion	6.5/10
Pitchfork	5.3/10

Spirit Animal is the third studio album by Zombi. It was released in 2009 on Relapse Records. Alongside the synthesizer sounds of the group's previous recordings, Zombi utilizes electric guitar instrumentation for the first time on this album.

== Track listing ==
Spirit Animal track listing
No.	Title	Length
1.	"Spirit Animal"	14:00
2.	"Spirit Warrior"	8:55
3.	"Earthly Powers"	10:45
4.	"Cosmic Powers"	6:47
5.	"Through Time"	17:40

Bonus track
No.	Title	Length
6.	"Infinity"	13:44

== Production ==
- Mixed, engineered, and mastered by Steve Moore
- All songs written by Zombi

== Musicians ==
- Steve Moore – bass, synthesizers, keyboards, guitars
- A.E. Paterra – drums, percussion, synthesizers
