= Camden Toy =

American actor (1955–2023)

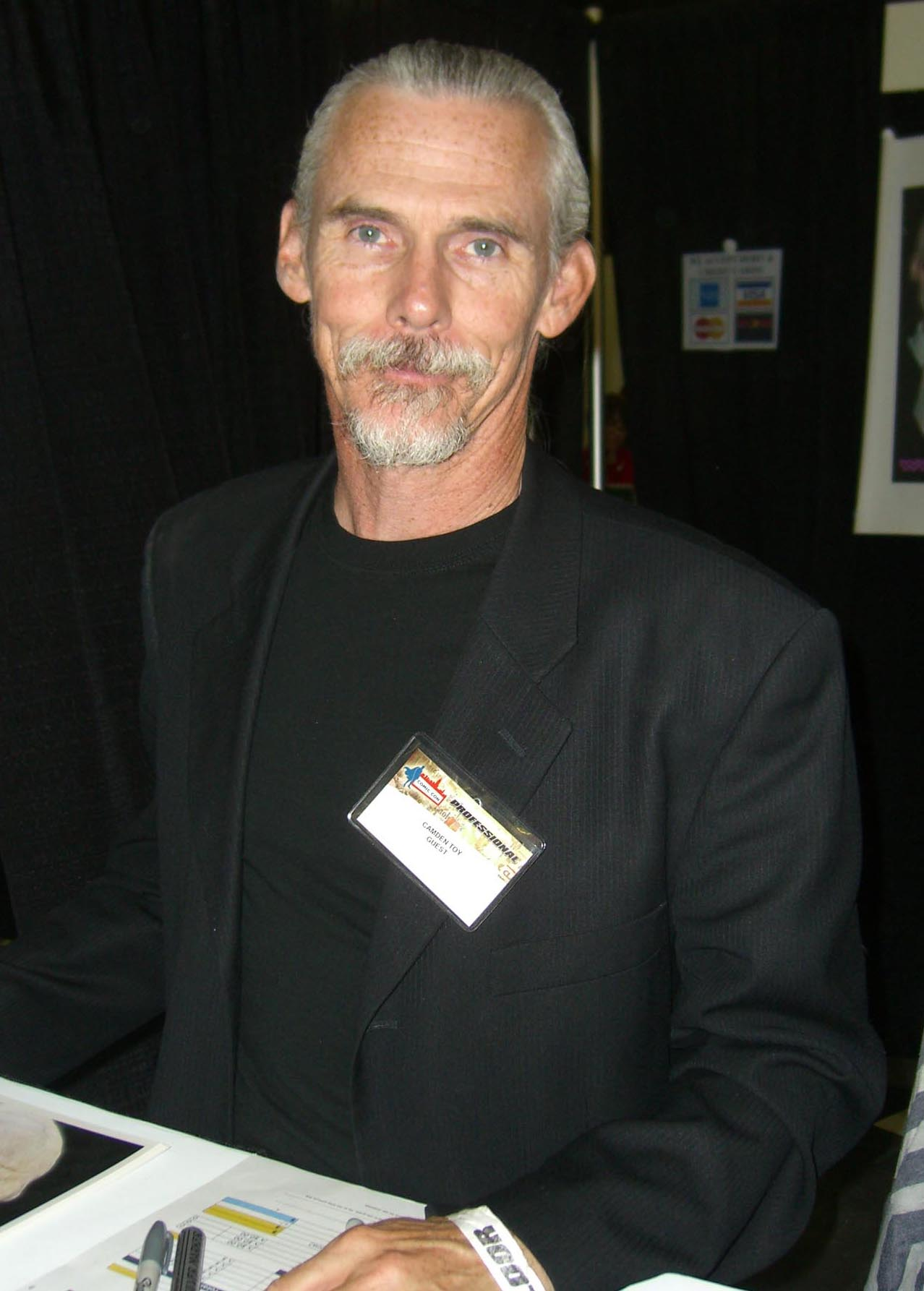
- Toy at the Big Apple Convention, October 17, 2009
- Born: May 31, 1955; Pittsburgh, Pennsylvania, U.S.
- Died: December 11, 2023 (aged 68); Los Osos, California, U.S.
- Education: MA Clinical Psychology, Antioch University Santa Barbara, 2022; MFA Creative Writing (Screenwriting), Antioch University Santa Barbara, 2023
- Occupations: Actor; writer; psychotherapist
- Years active: 1984–2023
- Employer: Community Counseling Center of San Luis Obispo County
- Television: Buffy the Vampire Slayer, Goodnight Burbank, The Bay (web series)

Camden Toy (May 31, 1955 – December 11, 2023) was an American actor, writer, film editor and psychotherapist. He was best known as a character actor, often under special effects prosthetic makeup. He had acted in over one hundred independent films, and several television roles. In later years, he returned to college to receive a Master of Arts in clinical psychology in order to provide counseling, focusing on people recovering from addiction. He also received a Master of Fine Arts in creative writing shortly before his death.

== Early life ==
Toy grew up in Pennsylvania, and his interest in the film industry was encouraged early on by his father, who worked as an actor and makeup artist.

== Career ==
After spending many years in regional theater companies, Toy became one of the founding members and artistic director of the Obie Award-winning Todo con Nada theatre in New York City.

After moving to Los Angeles, he appeared as one of the demonic Gentlemen in the Buffy the Vampire Slayer episode "Hush", consistently listed as one of the best and scariest episodes of the series. In fact, Toy won the role in the silent audition by creeping out series creator Joss Whedon so much with his improvisational miming that he declared, "I'm going to have nightmares now!" In season seven, he played the skin-eating demon Gnarl in "Same Time, Same Place", and had a recurring role of the "ubervamp" Turok-Han. Although Toy was on several episodes of Buffy the Vampire Slayer, he was always under such heavy prosthetics and makeup that star Sarah Michelle Gellar had to be shown a photograph of him to recognize him out of character. He also played the Nosferatu-like vampire "The Prince of Lies" on the Angel episode "Why We Fight".

Toy was a series regular on the television sitcom Goodnight Burbank and in the first four seasons of the Emmy Award-winning series The Bay. He appeared in an episode of Into the Dark on Hulu and starred in movies Average Joe (2021) and Boogey-Man (2021).

== Fan conventions ==
Toy was a regular guest at many comic and pop culture conventions and often shared panels and photo-ops with other Buffy the Vampire Slayer and Angel alumni.

== Death ==
After a two-year private battle, Camden Toy died from pancreatic cancer at his home in Los Osos, California, on December 11, 2023.

== Tributes ==
Buffy star Sarah Michelle Gellar posted an image of Camden as a Gentleman with the caption "It was an honor #CamdenToy" on her Instagram account.

Doug Jones, fellow Gentlemen and Guillermo del Toro muse said:

"To know Camden Toy is to love Camden Toy. We may have met on the set of Buffy as two hideous looking "Gentlemen," but that only sparked a dear friendship that would continue for twenty-four years. It's rare to find a man so joyful, smiley, smart, giggly, huggie, good at listening with his heart, and accessible always to anyone he knew, including his many fans. May he rest in God's peace."

Juliet Landau, who portrayed "Drusilla" on Buffy the Vampire Slayer and Angel:

"Camden was a beautiful soul, a beautiful friend, and a beautiful talent. From the first moment we met, I knew he was special. Under the visage of the monster he was made up to be, shined the kindest of spirits. He's been a gift in our lives. We will miss him greatly."

Gregori J. Martin, producer of The Bay:

"Camden was always such a talent and joy to work with. It's no wonder he was such a fan favorite on The Bay. I am so grateful for the times I got to work with him and will certainly cherish those memories."

Mark A. Altman, TV/Film writer/producer/author tweeted: "A GENTLEMAN & A SCHOLAR: Immensely saddened to hear about the passing of CAMDEN TOY. He was such a warm man who worked on several of my films and also was so sweet to my #Buffy loving family. He will be missed. If you can, please make a donation to @PanCA today in his memory!"

James C. Leary, who portrayed demon Clem on Buffy, tweeted his condolences, stating he appreciated his time traveling and work with Toy.

== Filmography ==
=== Film ===
Year	Title	Role	Notes
1993	The Genius	Patient	
1997	Faith	Mailman	
2001	Backgammon	TV Announcer	
2005	All Souls Day	Fresh Dead / Dead Raoul	
2005	The Works	Janitor	
2006	The Videos 1989–2004	King Nothing	Metallica video album
2006	Outta Sync	Dogsbody	
2007	Morning Glory	Lucky	
2008	Trickery Mimicry	Farmer	
2009	Immortally Yours	Henry	
2009	Klikt	Man / Clown	
2010	Carnies	Panusch	
2010	Bare Knuckles	Manager	
2011	ChromeSkull: Laid to Rest 2	Dr. Kerr	
2011	Hard Love	Ralph	
2011	Sebastian	Homeless Man	
2012	Big Bad Bugs	Sydney Gerber	
2013	Dark Splinter	Donovan Braeden	
2013	Feed Me	Albert	
2014	Now Hiring	Lord Menace	
2014	Disciples	The Watcher	
2015	A Blood Story	Francis / Ferenc Nadasdy	
2016	Bedeviled	Tall Clown	
2021	Boogey-Man	The Shape	
2021	Average Joe	Lord Menace	

=== Television ===
Year	Title	Role	Notes
1999–2003	Buffy the Vampire Slayer	Various roles	6 episodes
2004	Angel	Prince of Lies	Episode: "Why We Fight"
2008	The Mentalist	Gambler	Episode: "Red-Handed"
2008–2009	The Insider's Guide to Film School	Professor Strauss	4 episodes
2010–2014	The Bay	Igor Chambers	14 episodes
2011	Goodnight Burbank	Yan Bobek	6 episodes
2016	Shameless	Pan	Episode: "A Yurt of One's Own"
2017	Monster School Animation	Security Officer Toy	Episode: "Welcome to Monster School"
2019	Into the Dark	The Prankster	Episode: "Uncanny Annie"
