= Torched (film) =

2004 film by Ryan Nicholson

- Char-Broiled Edition DVD released by Plotdigger Films
- Directed by: Ryan Nicholson
- Written by: Vince D'Amato
- Screenplay by: Vince D'Amato
- Story by: Patrick Coble; Ryan Nicholson
- Produced by: Nicole Hancock; Ryan Nicholson
- Starring: Thomas Obrien; Joshua Casey; Calum Macaulay; Michelle Boback; Rob Scattergood
- Cinematography: Damien Foisy
- Edited by: Guy Russell; Vince D'Amato
- Music by: Rob Johnson; Christ Stanley; Ryan Nicholson
- Production companies: Plotdigger Films; Creepy Six Films
- Distributed by: Brain Damage Films
- Release date: 2004
- Running time: 45 minutes
- Country: Canada
- Language: English
- Budget: $4,000

Torched is a 2004 horror short film directed by Ryan Nicholson and written by Vince D'Amato.

== Plot ==
While heading out to work, university hospital nurse Deanna is tased and raped in her apartment elevator by a hooded man wearing a surgical mask and medical gloves. The next day, the traumatized Deanna subdues a burglar who breaks into her apartment using the rapist's abandoned stun gun. Deanna, convinced the intruder is the same man who raped her, ties the burglar up, strips him down to nothing but his underwear and balaclava, and takes some of his blood. At work, Deanna steals urine samples, makes plans to go out with a friend and co-worker named Leanna on Thursday, and asks her boss, Doctor Tyson, to compare the burglar's blood to a swab of semen she had collected after being raped. Deanna tells Doctor Tyson that a friend was raped, and that the blood belongs to her ex-boyfriend, who she suspects was her assailant. Back at home, Deanna tortures the burglar by covering him in the urine samples, burning him with a blow torch, and jabbing him with syringes.

When Thursday arrives, Deanna goes out to a nightclub with Leanne, and hours later returns to her building severely intoxicated. While stumbling up to her apartment, Deanna bumps into a neighbor and acquaintance named Trevor, who she seduces and has sex with. A relationship develops between the two, as Deanna becomes further unhinged, and begins suffering from nightmares. She also continues to torture the burglar, dressing in fetish-wear attire for the occasions, and attaining an almost sexual gratification from the man's suffering. One day, Deanna gives the burglar a handjob, and afterward destroys his genitals with needles and the blow torch.

A week after castrating the burglar, Deanna hires a gigolo drug addict to sodomize him. While the addict has his way with the burglar, Deanna leaves and goes to Trevor's apartment. There, Deanna discovers circumstantial evidence indicating Trevor was her rapist, walks in on Trevor and Leanne having sex, and attacks them with a circular saw that was among Trevor's carpentry tools. Deanna beheads Leanne with the saw, and bashes Trevor's face in with it. Returning to her apartment, Deanna murders the gigolo by stabbing him in the neck with a knife after he reveals the burglar had died at some point during the rape. Deanna then goes to the hospital in search of Doctor Tyson, spotting him seated in his parked car, dressed like her rapist and surrounded by sadistic pornography and stun guns identical to the one she was attacked with. When Doctor Tyson tries to pull her into the car, Deanna jams a cigarette lighter into one of his eyes, and knocks him out with one of the stun guns. Having finally found her rapist, Deanna abducts Doctor Tyson, and the film ends as she prepares to torture him.

== Cast ==
- Michelle Boback as Deanna
- Tamara Pender as Leanne
- Daniel Lomas as Dr. Tyson
- Ryan Haneman as Trevor
- Rob Scattergood as Hustler
- Peter Speers as 2nd Hustler
- Rob Carpenter as Lounge MD
- Christ Stanley as Patient
- Sarah Bergeest as Patient
- Nicole Hancock as Reception Nurse
- Willard Cochrane as Curious John

== Soundtrack ==
- "Fritz Haarman der Metzger" performed by Macabre from the album Murder Metal.
- "Reign in Blood" performed by Ill Bill featuring Necro from the album Necro Presents: Brutality Pt. 1.
- "Fire" performed by Necro from the album Necro Presents: Brutality Pt. 1.
- "Upon Freyed Lips of Silence" performed by Necrophagia from the album The Divine Art of Torture.
- "Parasite Eve" performed by Necrophagia from the album The Divine Art of Torture.
- "Flowers of Flesh and Blood" performed by Necrophagia from the album The Divine Art of Torture.
- "The Big Sleep" performed by Goretex from the album Necro Presents: Brutality Pt. 1.
- "Scumbags" performed by Goretex featuring Necro from the album Necro Presents: Brutality Pt. 1.
- "Festering Beneath the Fog" performed by Ravenous from the album Blood Delerium.
- "Nightmares in a Damaged Brain" performed by Ravenous from the album Blood Delerium.
- "Cheap Transistor Radio" performed by SNFU from the album In the Meantime and In Between Time.

== Release ==
Torched was first released in edited form as a segment in co-creator Creepy Six Films's women's revenge-themed anthology Hell Hath No Fury on March 6, 2007. This version of the film was later re-released by Creepy Six, with commentary by Vince D'Amato, Ryan Nicholson, Peter Speers, as part of a DVD double feature with Sex and Death: 1977 on February 8, 2008.

An uncut version of Torched was released on DVD by Plotdigger Films in 2010. This edition was limited to 666 copies, and included a commentary and interview with Ryan Nicholson, and a fifteen-minute making-of featurette titled Behind the Burn: The Making of Torched.

== Reception ==
Torched was praised by Film Bizarro, which wrote "Even though Torched may lack the realism that's in a movie like Irréversible and is over-the-top with its violence; it is still plenty shocking and brutal enough that I believe it qualifies as one of the more nasty rape-revenge films to be made. It isn't just a shallow exploitation film, there is some genuine character development in the movie, and while the rape scene itself didn't really have the punch that other movies have, the torture and balls-out violence in the end will leave the viewers both disturbed and satisfied. A perfect score of seven was awarded by Independent Flicks, which stated "Torched is brutal, sick and twisted! It's a disturbing and creepy film and I recommend it highly to hardcore horror fans!"

The Worldwide Celluloid Massacre had a negative response to the film, calling it "Amateurish extreme sickness". Almost every aspect of Torched was criticized by Soiled Sinema, which felt that it offered nothing of interest besides admittedly impressive gore, and unintentional hilarity.
