= Zombi (band) =

American electronic music duo

- Origin: Pittsburgh, Pennsylvania, United States
- Genres: Progressive electronic; space rock; instrumental rock; synthwave
- Years active: 2001–present
- Labels: Relapse, Hypertension
- Members: Steve Moore; Anthony Paterra
- Website: Zombi.us

Zombi is an American electronic music duo from Pittsburgh, Pennsylvania, consisting of Steve Moore on bass and synthesizers and Anthony Paterra on drums. The group makes use of looping to create multi-layered compositions. They have toured with Don Caballero, Isis, Orthrelm, The Psychic Paramount, Daughters, Red Sparowes, These Arms Are Snakes, Trans Am, and Goblin.

They are currently signed to Relapse Records. In 2006, the band signed with Belgian record label Hypertension Records to release Surface to Air on vinyl.

Moore was previously a member of Microwaves, a metal/no-wave band from Pittsburgh, Pennsylvania, and has toured with Red Sparowes. Paterra is a former member of the Pittsburgh band The 1985.

Their song "Sapphire" was remixed by Norwegian DJ/producer Prins Thomas.

== Musical style and influences ==
Zombi's musical style was influenced by film score composers John Carpenter and Goblin, electronic music artists Tangerine Dream and Vangelis, and progressive rock bands King Crimson and Genesis. 2011's Escape Velocity showed influence from Italo-disco and Krautrock. Following their 2013 tour with Goblin, Zombi's style became more rock-oriented for their following releases. The band takes its name from the Italian title of George A. Romero's Dawn of the Dead (Zombi).

== Discography ==
=== Studio albums ===
- Cosmos (2004)
- Surface to Air (Relapse Records, 2006)
- Spirit Animal (2009)
- Escape Velocity (2011)
- Shape Shift (2015)
- 2020 (2020)
- Direct Inject (2024)

=== Other releases ===
- Zombi demo (2002)
- Twilight Sentinel EP (2003)
- Zombi Anthology (re-issue of first two EPs, 2005)
- Digitalis tour EP (2006)
- Split LP with Maserati (2009)
- Slow Oscillations EP (2011)
- Evans City EP (2020)
- Liquid Crystal (2021)
