= Killer Pad =

2008 film by Robert Englund

- Directed by: Robert Englund
- Written by: Dan Stoller
- Produced by: Avi Chesed; Wayne Allan Rice
- Starring: Daniel Franzese; Eric Jungmann; Shane McRae
- Cinematography: David Stump
- Edited by: Erik C. Andersen
- Music by: Timothy Andrew Edwards
- Distributed by: Grindstone Entertainment Group
- Release date: February 5, 2008
- Running time: 84 minutes
- Country: United States
- Language: English

Killer Pad is a 2008 comedy horror film directed by Robert Englund and starring Daniel Franzese, Eric Jungmann and Shane McRae.

== Plot ==
Three friends, Brody, Craig, and Doug, get a new house from Winnie, an Asian woman, so they can hook up with women. They encounter a mysterious Mexican man who warns them of the devil, but they think he is a squatter who is talking about hot sauce so they ignore him. At the house they meet three attractive women, Lucy, Jezebel, and Delilah. They once again encounter the Mexican and he attempts to warn them that the house is evil, but he becomes possessed by the house and rips out his own heart and jumps out the window, which seemingly kills him. A fire marshall enters to check but he is dragged to hell. Believing they passed the inspection, the guys decide to throw a party.

During the party several party guests, including actor Joey Lawrence, a pair of German triplets, Vance and Wayne, and a midget porn star named Tito are killed. Eric and Craig realize this after they discover the corpses and tell Brody this. The Mexican appears, now in drag and revealed to be an angel, and tells the guys that the house is actually a portal to hell. The guys realize that Delilah and Jezebel are behind the killings after they witness them killing a geek. Brody attempts to warn Lucy about her friends but he discovers that she is actually the devil and that Delilah and Jezebel are her minions. Lucy attempts to seduce Brody but he is disgusted when he finds out she has a penis.

The guys attempt to warn the remaining party guests about the murders, but Lucy, Jezebel, and Delilah arrive and trap the guests. The guys attempt to defeat them using holy songs but this does not work. Backwater, a priest, sends Delilah and Jezebel to hell using a rock song. Lucy is weakened but Brody is hesitant to finish her off but is reminded she has a penis and sends her back to hell. The house is destroyed, reviving all of the slain party guests. Winnie arrives and offers to help the guys find a new house. However Winnie is revealed to be a demon and tells the guys to "buckle up" ending the film.

== Cast ==
- Daniel Franzese as Doug
- Eric Jungmann as Craig
- Shane McRae as Brody
- Emily Foxler as Lucy
- Jeff B. Davis as Backwater
- Noureen DeWulf as Delilah
- Corri English as Jezebel
- Sam McMurray as Fire Marshall
- Katie Chonacas as Constance
- Héctor Jiménez as Angel
- Bobby Lee as Winnie
- Andy Milonakis as Dinko's Geek
- Edward Carnevale as Joe Molato
- Bergen Williams as Tina
- Christine Barger as Gwen
- Haley Hudson as Morgan
- Lin Shaye as Marge
- Mikey Post as Tito the Porn Star
- David 'Black' Hogan as Lead Singer
- Jason Thibeau as Co-Lead Singer
- Aleksandra Okapiec as Greta Von Schlutz
- Izabela Okapiec as Gerta Von Schlutz
- Monika Okapiec as Gretchen Von Schlutz
- Greg Cipes as Vance
- Chris Titone as Wayne
- Jennifer Lyons as Barbie
- Bobbi Sue Luther as Amber Waves
- Jay Thomas Bavaro as Party Goer
- Jessica Halloran as Female Party Goer
- Steve Berens as Party Goer
- Joey Lawrence as Himself

== See also ==
- List of American films of 2008
