= Gutterballs (film) =

2008 horror comedy film by Ryan Nicholson

- Balls-Out Uncut Edition DVD released by Plotdigger Films
- Directed by: Ryan Nicholson
- Written by: Ryan Nicholson
- Produced by: Roy Nicholson; Michelle Grady; Ryan Nicholson
- Starring: Dan Ellis; Nathan Witte; Mihola Terzic; Alastair Gamble; Candice Lewald
- Cinematography: Mark Atkins
- Edited by: Lars Simkins
- Music by: Gianni Rossi; Patrick Coble
- Production company: Plotdigger Films
- Distributed by: Plotdigger Films
- Release date: January 18, 2008 (Fangoria's Weekend of Horrors)
- Running time: 96 minutes
- Country: Canada
- Language: English
- Budget: $250,000

Gutterballs is a 2008 Canadian slasher film written and directed by Ryan Nicholson. The plot is centered around two rival teams at a bowling alley, Xcalibur Bowling Centre, spending a night after-hours to play against one another. Following a planned sadistic rape against one of the teams' members, everybody on both teams begins to get brutally killed one by one by an unknown killer the following night.

As with the director's other work, the film is notoriously known for its crude, brutal and very violent kills. It is also known for its incredibly drawn-out and long rape introduction.

== Plot ==
On January 1, 2008, at the Xcalibur Bowling Centre, a disco-themed bowling alley in Surrey, British Columbia, Egerton, the janitor, has allowed two groups of teenagers to bowl against one another after hours. After Steve and his friends Joey, Patrick, and A.J. harass Sam, a transgender woman, they are chastised by Jamie. A brawl then ensues between Steve's team and Jamie's. Lisa breaks up the fight by dropping a bowling ball on Steve's foot. Egerton tells the teenagers to leave and they can continue their tournament the following night.

Having forgotten her purse, Lisa heads back in. Inside, Steve proceeds to violently rape her. Egerton, downstairs, is unable to hear the commotion. Afterwards, he leaves. A.J. rapes Lisa on the pool table, then Joey abuses her. Patrick, horrified, refuses to participate. Steve returns with a bowling pin and prepares to insert it into Lisa before Patrick intervenes. Steve retorts by giving Patrick the pin, making him do it. He refuses at first, but is coerced by Steve. The four leave her on the pool table, still naked.

The following night, the two groups arrive at to continue. Steve is accompanied by Julia and Hannah. Jamie arrives with a traumatized Lisa. The teams begin, with Lisa leaving to the elevator. Patrick enters, apologizing. During the game, the players notice a mystery player on the scoreboard, BBK, but believe it is just a glitch. Dave meets Julia in the bar, and the two then makeout in the bathroom. The unknown killer exits one of the stalls while Dave and Julia are in the 69 position and suffocates them both. After this, two strikes appear next to BBK's scoreboard in the form of a skull and crossbones.

Sam goes to the bathroom to "freshen up." Frightened from a noise in a stall, she approaches and is then pulled under. They shove a bowling pin down her throat, and using Sam's switchblade, they castrate her. After, they chain up the exit. Lisa rejoins the group. Ben and Cindy have sex; Ben leaves to get a condom. Joey fixes the lane's pins. In the bathroom, Ben gets his eyes gouged out with a sharpened bowling pin. A.J. notices the increasing BBK strikes and questions Egerton about it; he says it's a glitch. Egerton then sends him to put a sign on a ball waxer that Joey broke earlier. Cindy, upstairs, gets strangled by shoe laces. Downstairs, a drunken Hannah searches for Julia. Her head is then crushed by a mechanical knight wielding two bowling balls. A.J. turns on a surprisingly fixed ball waxer, then is forcefully killed by it.

Annoyed, Steve goes behind the pinsetters to find a headless Joey. The killer appears; Steve tries to fight, but is bludgeoned with a bowling pin, then sodomized. The killer bashes his head in. Sarah and Jamie try to resume the game. Joey's severed head rolls out of the ball return machine. Both try to escape to no avail. They run and hide in the basement, where they find everyone's bodies.

The killer appears with a shotgun, then removes their mask to reveal Egerton. Lisa enters, revealing she murdered Steve. Jamie was included in the plan too. Lisa asks Egerton why he killed all her friends, to which he explains they had not helped, despite them not knowing. Another killer, Patrick, enters. He confessed his involvement in the rape to Egerton, who spared him. A furious Lisa berates Egerton for letting him live, to which he slits his throat with Sam's switchblade. Jamie, realizing his insanity, wrestles Egerton and, after a scuffle, blows his head off. Lisa sulks over her father, then grabs the switchblade and tries to attack Jamie. Sarah grabs the shotgun and kills Lisa.

With every "BBK" (Bowling Bag Killer) gone, Sarah shoots the chains off the exit-doors so the two can escape. Unsettled at Jamie for doing nothing to prevent the murders, Sarah turns the gun on him and kills him.

== Cast ==
- Dan Ellis as Egerton
- Alastair Gamble as Steve
- Mihola Terzic as Sarah
- Nathan Witte as Jamie
- Candice Lewald as Lisa
- Trevor Gemma as Patrick
- Nathan Dashwood as A.J.
- Wade Gibb as Joey
- Jimmy Blais as Sam
- Jeremy Beland as Ben
- Scott Alonzo as Dave
- Danielle Munro as Julia
- Stephanie Schacter as Cindy
- Saraphina Bardeaux as Hannah

== Release ==
The Balls-Out Uncut Edition was released by Plotdigger Films on DVD on April 29, 2008. The film was re-released (with an altered soundtrack) by TLA Releasing the following year on January 27, 2009.

The Pin-Etration Edition, a cut containing hardcore inserts and limited to 69 copies, was available for purchase on the Plotdigger Films website in 2011.

Despite the two unrated/uncut versions, the only notable differences are extensions with the rape scene, where more closeups are shown. Everything else is left as is, with no extensions or additions to its violence.

The film has a total of 516 uses of the word "fuck", ranking it fifth (behind Swearnet: The Movie, the documentary of the same name about the history and usage of the word, and The Wolf of Wall Street), and first in total usage for a scripted film.

Nicholson submitted the film to the MPAA Rating Board. However, it was released unrated when he was told that almost twenty minutes would have to be cut to avoid an NC-17 rating.

== Reception ==
Johnny Butane of Dread Central said that while the music was fitting and the gore was impressive, the film suffered from atrociously bad acting, and "hits all the wrong notes, even if it's [sic] intentions are in the right place".

In a review for DVD Verdict, Gordon Sullivan praised the gore, the atmosphere, and the performance of Dan Ellis, and despite finding various faults with the film (such as the prolonged rape scene, actions of the killers, and discomforting nudity) still recommended it, finding that it "delivers on everything it promises: old-school slasher thrills loaded with gore and nudity set in a kitschy '80s bowling alley". Gutterballs was described as "one of the weirdest movies I've seen" by Kurt Dahlke of DVD Talk, who gave it a two and a half out of a possible five, and concluded that it was "a damn fine sexually explicit, graphically violent, morally repugnant, willfully bad B movie" that refreshingly took itself seriously, despite the over-the-top subject matter.

== Sequel ==
A sequel, subtitled Balls Deep, premiered in 2015, written and directed by Ryan Nicholson. The film stars Aidan Dee, Momona Komagata and Kirsty Elizabeth in the leading roles. The film premiered in May 2015 as part of the Texas Frightmare Weekend.

== See also ==
- List of films that most frequently use the word fuck
