= Steve Moore (musician) =

American musician

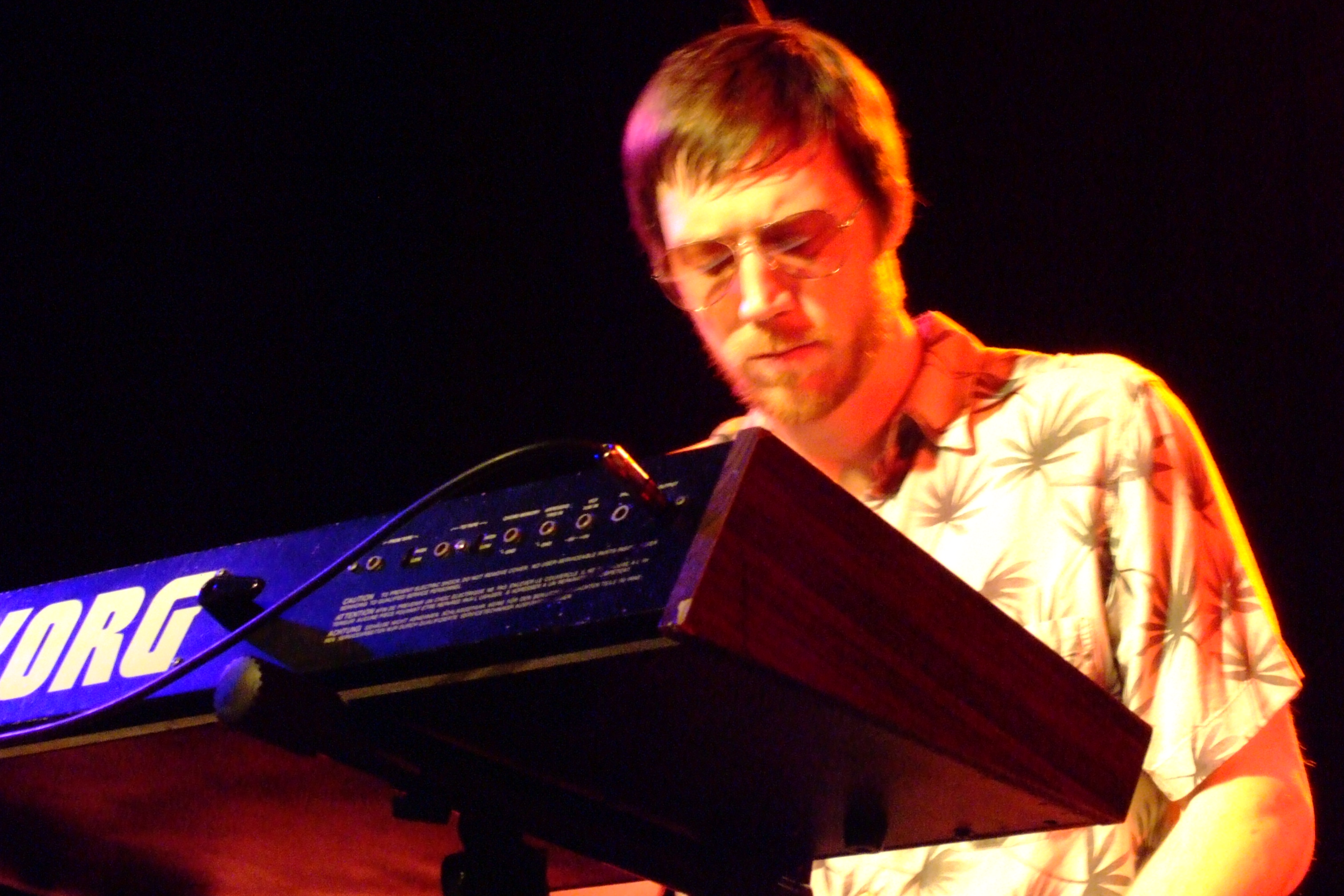
- Moore performing with Zombi in 2007

Background information
- Origin: Pittsburgh, Pennsylvania, United States
- Genres: Electronic, progressive rock, film score
- Labels: Relapse Records, Eskimo Recordings
- Website: www.stevemoore2600.com

Steve Moore is an American, New York–based multi-instrumentalist/producer/film composer, best known for his synthesizer and bass guitar work with Zombi.

Moore also plays bass guitar for Brooklyn progressive rock band Titan, and has worked with Microwaves, Red Sparowes, Lair of the Minotaur, Ghost, Goblin, Maserati, Municipal Waste, Sally Shapiro and Panthers. Moore releases solo material as well, occasionally adopting pseudonyms (such as dance/pop alter-ego Lovelock). His solo work also includes film scores, predominantly low-budget horror films, and remixes for a wide range of artists including Washed Out, Lower Dens, Voivod and The Melvins.

In 2019, he had a collaborative relationship with Emel Mathlouthi: he worked on her album Everywhere We Looked Was Burning and in return she made the leading vocals on the opener "Your Sentries Will Be Met with Force" on his Beloved Exile album.

He has written soundtracks for low budget films including Gutterballs and Star Vehicle under the name Gianni Rossi.

== Discography and filmography ==
- The Henge (Relapse Records, 2007)
- Vaalbara (2008)
- Fever Dream (Mexican Summer, 2009)
- Primitive Neural Pathways (Static Caravan, 2010)
- Light Echoes (Cuneiform Records, 2012)
- "Signal II" remix on Long Distance Poison's Gliese Translations (2013)
- Pangaea Ultima (2013)
- The Guest (2014 film)
- The Mind's Eye (2016 film)
- Beloved Exile (2019)
- VFW (2019 film)
- Bliss (2020)
- Liminal Migration (Steve Moore & Bluetech, 2021)
- Suitable Flesh (2023 film)

=== As Gianni Rossi ===
- Gutterballs Original Soundtrack (Permanent Vacation, 2008)
- Star Vehicle Original Soundtrack (Permanent Vacation, 2010)
