= FP2 =

FP2 may refer to:

- Cyclopentadienyliron dicarbonyl dimer, an organometallic compound
- Fp2: an EEG electrode site according to the 10-20 system
- FP2: Beats of Rage, a 2018 comedy film
- Fairphone 2, a smartphone by Fairphone B.V.
- FP-2 series Fire Point Ukrainian attack drone
