= Lee Valmassy =

American director and actor (born 1987)

- Born: Lee Douglas Valmassy; September 15, 1987 (age 38); San Diego, California, United States
- Occupations: Director, Actor
- Years active: 2007–present

Lee Douglas Valmassy (born September 15, 1987) is an American director and actor. He is best known for starring as L Dubba E The FP (2011) and as Charlie / The Wall in Vs (2011). In all of his American film projects, he has worked in collaboration with Jason Trost.

== Filmography ==
| Year | Title | Role | Notes |
|---|---|---|---|
| 2007 | The FP | L Dubba E | Short film |
| 2007 | The Day the Dead Weren't Dead | Ernie Douglas | Short film |
| 2011 | The FP | L Dubba E | |
| 2011 | Vs | Charlie / The Wall | |
