= Hellfire (2026 film) =

American action-thriller film by Isaac Florentine

- Promotional release poster
- Directed by: Isaac Florentine
- Written by: Richard Lowry
- Produced by: Sasha Yelaun; Robert Paschall Jr.; Daniel Lief; Johnny Remo; Christian Filippella
- Starring: Stephen Lang; Dolph Lundgren; Harvey Keitel; Scottie Thompson; Johnny Yong Bosch; Michael Sirow; Chris Mullinax; Maurice Compte; Levon Panek; Jason Scott Morgan; Carl Bailey; Natalie Canerday
- Cinematography: Ross W. Clarkson
- Edited by: Paul Harb; Kurt Nishimura
- Music by: Stephen Edwards
- Production companies: Phantasm Films; JARS Productions; Skipstone Pictures; Satyricon Pictures; Edge Code Films; Diamond Bear Brewing Company; Millman Productions; Umbrelic Entertainment; Ron Lee Productions
- Distributed by: Saban Films
- Release dates: February 5, 2026 (Middle East); February 17, 2026 (United States)
- Running time: 95 minutes
- Country: United States
- Language: English
- Box office: $761 (UAE)

Hellfire is a 2026 American action-thriller film directed by Isaac Florentine and written by Richard Lowry. It stars Stephen Lang, Dolph Lundgren, Harvey Keitel, Scottie Thompson, Johnny Yong Bosch, Michael Sirow, Chris Mullinax, Maurice Compte, Levon Panek, Jason Scott Morgan, Carl Bailey, and Natalie Canerday.

The film is set in 1988, and centers on a former soldier-turned drifter who arrives at a small town plagued by a ruthless crime lord, and attempts to free the place from his grasp, bonding with the daughter of a bar owner.

== Plot ==
In 1988, Owen is a small time bar owner with the help of his daughter Lena in the small Texan town of Rondo. Jeremiah Whitfield is working with the cartel using their brewery to distribute cocaine. Whitfield’s son Clyde arrives and attempts to seduce Lena but Owen intervenes. Clyde pushes Owen and warns him not to intervene before Clyde and his gang leave.

Meanwhile, a drifter arrives at the town and offers Owen help to clean the bar and fix things. Sheriff Wiley then arrives and it is revealed that the town is under control of crime boss Jeremiah Whitfield, and use the people as employees who he forces to work for him in his brewery. Owen names the drifter Nomada (a play on the words "a nomad").

Nomada then rents a hotel room and during a bath has flashbacks of a battle he faced as an ex Green Beret. He returns to the bar while the Sheriff returns and attempts to arrest him but Nomada tricks Sheriff Wiley by pretending he called his old friend, US Army Colonel Jack Hollister. Instead, Nomada got help from his phone contact who "owes" him.

Nomada and Lena then go 50 miles north to retrieve a bag full of guns delivered by plane by Nomada's contact but are ambushed by two of his men who take the fight to an abandoned warehouse where Nomada keeps Lena safe while he shoots the two men dead.

They return to the salon where Clyde and Zeke (Jeremiah's right-hand man) has taken the whole town hostage. Clyde violently knocks out Nomada, leaving him dead, and kidnaps Lena while Zeke kills eveyone else including Owen. Nomada finally wakes up and kills two men before traveling to the brewery warehouse to save Lena.

However, he is intercepted by Wiley who arrests him but he manages to escape while Zeke kills Wiley after an argument. Nomada then kills Zeke's men before breaking Zeke's neck after a fight, killing him. Clyde arrives at the brewery warehouse with Lena and attempts to run Nomada over but Nomada shoots and kills him and saves Lena.

Nomada and Lena then travel to Jeremiah's house, Jeremiah recognizes Nomada, calling him "Hollister", thus revealing Nomada is in fact Colonel Jack Hollister, then Whitfield (his former General) calls him "soldier" before ordering him to drop his gun. Nomada then shoots him in the leg before pouring brandy on him and setting him and his mansion on fire, finally killing him and putting an end to his operation.

Nomada and Lena have a funeral for Owen before the two go separate ways. Now free to go, Lena finally leaves the town to begin a new life while Nomada, having eliminated the drug operation, walks away to another town.

The missing part is Hollister knew Whitfield was responsible for sending soldiers him included to their death in a suicide mission, which is why he ended up in Rondo.

== Cast ==
- Stephen Lang as "Jack Hollister/The Drifter/Nomada"
- Dolph Lundgren as Sheriff Wiley, a corrupt sheriff working for Jeremiah.
- Harvey Keitel as Jeremiah Whitfield,a drug boss
- Scottie Thompson as Lena, Owen's daughter
- Johnny Yong Bosch as Zeke, Jeremiah's right-hand man
- Michael Sirow as Clyde, Jeremiah's son
- Chris Mullinax as Owen, a disabled bar owner.
- Carl Bailey as Randal
- Maurice Compte as Salvadore
- Levon Panek as Cletus
- Natalie Canerday as Vivian

== Production ==
In September 2022, it was announced that an action-thriller film directed by Isaac Florentine and written by Richard Lowry had completed principal photography in Arkansas. Stephen Lang, Dolph Lundgren, Harvey Keitel, Scottie Thompson, Johnny Yong Bosch, Michael Sirow, Chris Mullinax, Maurice Compte, Levon Panek, Jason Scott Morgan, Carl Bailey, and Natalie Canerday rounded out the cast.

== Release ==
In February 2023, Saban Films acquired worldwide distribution rights to the film. The film was first released in the Middle East on February 5, 2026, and in the United States on February 17.
