= Christian Filippella =

Italian film director

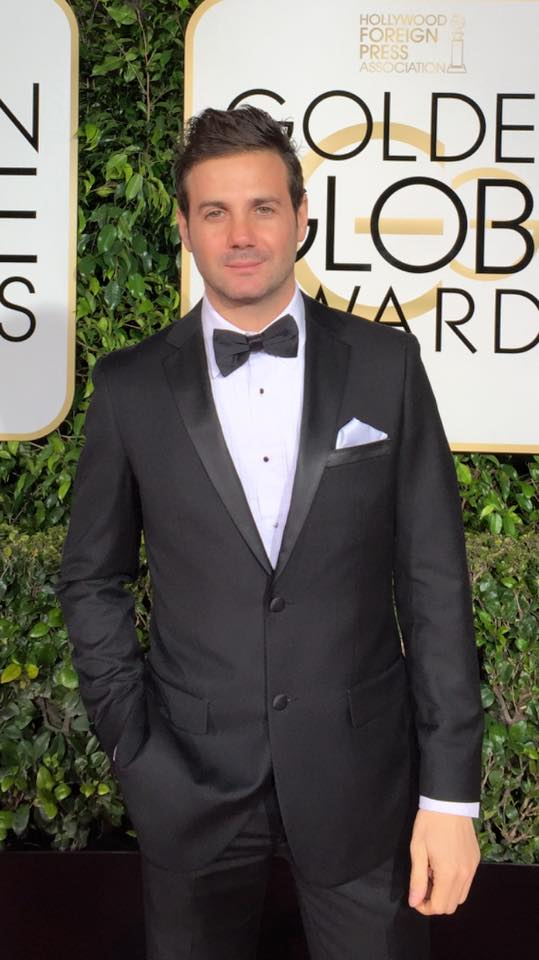
- Filippella at the 2015 Golden Globes
- Born: Benevento, Campania, Italy
- Occupation: Producer/Director
- Years active: 1998–present

Christian Filippella is an Emmy Award Nominated and winning producer, cinematographer and director, active member of the Producers Guild of America (PGA) and the Academy of Television Arts & Sciences (ATAS/NATAS).

Mr. Filippella began working as an independent filmmaker in Spain and Ireland. He was accepted to the directing program of the prestigious Centro Sperimentale di Cinematografia in Rome and was awarded his diploma in 2005 with his thesis film Thermae.

Subsequently, he was awarded a Fulbright Scholarship and completed MFA studies at the American Film Institute (AFI) in 2008.

Mr Filippella won twice the Philip Morris Cinema Award, the Panavision, Arri and Fuji grants and the Sergio Corbucci Prize.

His first feature film Silver Case stars Academy Award nominees Seymour Cassel and Eric Roberts in the lead role of the Senator, and features Shalim Ortiz, Chris Facey, Brian Keith Gamble, Vincent De Paul (actor), Fernanda Romero, Scarlett Chorvat and Claire Falconer.

Silver Case, which premiered at Rome International Film Festival, won 5 Indie Awards with Best of Show. The movie has been released worldwide.

The Los Angeles Times reviewed the film as "brisk, good-looking and never dull"

Mr Filippella has since then produced and shot several other feature films, documentaries and TV shows including Nandor Fodor and The Talking Mongoose, distributed by Paramount, starring Academy Award actress Minnie Driver, Christopher Lloyd and Simon Pegg, Hellfire starring Academy Award Nominee Harvey Keitel, Stephen Lang and Dolph Lundgren, Mafia Wars starring Tom Welling and Cam Gigandet, the award winning documentary The Genius of Gianni Versace about the life and career of fashion designer Gianni Versace, the multiple Emmy Award Winning series The Bay, Swifty & Veg with Tommy Flanagan and Mark Boone, the holiday films Christmas Couples Retreat, This is Our Christmas and Beverly Hills Christmas starring among others Dean Cain, Academy Award Nominee John Savage, Ronn Moss and Academy Award Winner Margaret O'Brien.

In 2018 Filippella received the Halo Award and the Life Achievement Award from the Motion Picture Council in Hollywood.

His latest documentary Aloha Spirit Rising Cosmic Consciousness (2024), shot in Hawaii, follows the lives of a free-spirited community living off-the-grid in the secluded Hawaiian jungle, won a Telly Award as Best Documentary.

Mr Filippella won two more Telly Awards for producing The Bay.

== Honors ==
- Telly Award - Tellies (2026) - Gold Telly for cinematography for Ring of Kibo
- Telly Award - Tellies (2025) - Best documentary for Aloha Spirit Rising
- Silver Telly Award - Tellies (2025) - Audience Award for The Bay
- Bronze Telly Award - Tellies (2025) - General Entertainment for The Bay
- Webby Award - Webby (2025) - Honoree Video and Film Scripted for The Bay
- Daytime Emmy Nomination - Television Academy of Arts & Sciences (2024)
- Life Achievement Award - Motion Picture Council (2018)
- Halo Award - Best Feature - Motion Picture Council (2018)
- Los Angeles Film & TV Festival - Best Feature (2013)
- Los Angeles Film & TV Festival - Best Director (2013)
- Vegas Cine Fest - Best Feature First Runner Up (2012)
- Indie Award - Best of Show (2012)
- Indie Award - Direction (2012)
- Accolade Award - Directing (2012)
- Merit Award - FLIFF (2011)
- Spirit of Independent Award (2011)
- Accolade Award - Film (2009)
- Sergio Corbucci Prize (2006)
- Fulbright Award (2006)
- Philip Morris Cinema Award (2004)
- Philip Morris Cinema Award (2003)
- Deviate NIFC (2002)

== Filmography (director) ==
- Aloha Spirit Rising Documentary (2024)
- Struck in the 80s TV Short Series (2024)
- Swifty and Veg TV Short Series (2024)
- Beverly Hills Christmas 2, Director's Cut (2021)
- This is Our Christmas (2018)
- Red Wine & Gold music video (2018)
- Silver Case (2012)
- Tangled (2010)
- Swifty & Veg (2010)
- White Widow (2009)
- Narcissus Dreams (2009)
- Thermae (2006)
- Il rigore più lungo del mondo (2004)
- Silver Nail (2003)
- Distretto di polizia - 2nd unit director (4 episodes, 2003)

== Filmography (writer) ==
- Struck in the 80s TV Mini Series (2023)
- Beverly Hills Christmas 2, Director's Cut (2018)
- This is Our Christmas (2021)
- Silver Case (2011)
- Swifty & Veg (2010)
- Narcissus Dreams (2009)
- White Widow (2009)
- Thermae (2006)
- Il rigore più lungo del mondo (2004)
- Silver Nail (2003)

== Filmography (producer) ==
- Hellfire (2026)
- Ring of Kibo (2025)
- The Arkane Awakening (2025)
- The Shape of Things (Dick Brewer Story) (2025)
- Beyond the Ruins (2025)
- The Bay (TV Series) - Popstar TV (2025)
- The Bay (TV Series) - Popstar TV (2024)
- Aloha Spirit Rising Documentary (2024)
- Swifty & Veg (2024)
- Mafia Wars (2024)
- The Bay (TV Series) - Popstar TV (2023)
- Nandor Fodor and the Talking Mongoose (2023)
- Christmas Couples Retreat (2023)
- The Genius of Gianni Versace (2023)
- Struck in the 80s TV Mini Series (2023)
- The Genius of Gianni Versace Alive (2022)
- Beverly Hills Christmas 2, Director's Cut (2021)
- A Place Called Hollywood (2019)
- Shepherd: The Story of Jewish Dog (2019)
- This is Our Christmas (2018)
- Beverly Hills Christmas (2015)
- A Place Called Hollywood TV Mini Series (2014)
- Silver Case (2012)
- The Wishmakers (2011)
- Swifty & Veg (2010)
- Tangled (2010)
- Narcissus Dreams (2009)
- White Widow (2009)
- Thermae (2004)
- Silver Nail (2003)

== Filmography (cinematograher) ==
- Aloha Spirit Rising Documentary (2024)
- The Bay Tv Show - Popstar TV (2023)
- Christmas Couples Retreat (2023)
- Struck in the 80s (2023)
- This is Our Christmas 2, Director's Cut (2021)
- Magic Max (2019)
- This is Our Christmas (2018)
- Beverly Hills Christmas (2015)
- Un Giorno a Roma Documentary (2012)
- Silver Case (2011)
