= FP2: Beats of Rage =

2018 film directed by Jason Trost

- Original poster, displaying the film's original title Beats of Rage
- Directed by: Jason Trost
- Written by: Jason Trost
- Produced by: Jim Stimpson; Jason Trost; Tallay Wickham
- Starring: Jason Trost; Art Hsu; Mike O'Gorman; Tallay Wickham; Bru Miller; Brandon Barrera; Nick Principe
- Cinematography: Markus Mentzer
- Edited by: Nicholas Davis
- Music by: The Moon Vampires
- Distributed by: Jason Trost
- Release dates: September 22, 2018 (Fantastic Fest); May 23, 2019 (United States)
- Running time: 89 minutes
- Country: United States
- Language: English

FP2: Beats of Rage is a 2018 American comedy film and the sequel to the 2011 film The FP. Written, produced, and directed by Jason Trost, the film focuses on JTRO (Trost) and KCDC (Art Hsu), former members of the 248 gang, traveling through the Wastes to participate in the Beats of Rage tournament. In order to supply alcohol to the citizens of Frazier Park, JTRO must play Beat-Beat Revelation—a music video game similar to Dance Dance Revolution—against AK-47, the leader of the Wastes. In addition to Trost and Hsu, Brandon Barrera and Nick Principe reprise their roles from the previous film. The film also features new cast members Mike O'Gorman, Tallay Wickham, and Bru Miller.

Trost spoke about creating a sequel to the first film, which he wrote and directed with his brother Brandon Trost, shortly after its release. Trost had planned two sequels to the film, with the first being set in Hong Kong. After several years struggling to get funding for the project due to the box office performance of the previous film, Trost began fundraising campaigns through crowdsourcing website Indiegogo and started production independently in 2017. The film premiered at Fantastic Fest on September 22, 2018, and was self-released through Amazon Prime Video and Vimeo on May 23, 2019.

== Cast ==
- Jason Trost as JTRO, a former member of the 248 gang and Beat-Beat Revelation player
  - Samantha Trost as young JTRO
- Art Hsu as KCDC, an energetic former member of the 248 and JTRO's best friend who served as the emcee for Beat-Beat Revelation matches
- Mike O'Gorman as AK-47
- Tallay Wickham as CHAI-T
- Bru Muller as NITRO
- Brandon Barrera as BTRO, JTRO's deceased brother and the original leader of the 248
- Nick Principe as BLT, an abrasive member of the 248 and JTRO's trainer
- Ryan Gibson as 3DYO / Quakka Jaxx / Han Cholo
- Jeff Howell as Forkliff
- Michael Davis as Wall Mamma
- Jordan Reynolds as Munchwad
- Sean Whalen as Stanya
- Lib Campbell as Pepper Snig
- Michael Lucas and Frank Sanders as Tequillo
- Alex Barron as Big Rig XL

== Production ==
According to Jason Trost, two sequels to The FP have been planned, the first of which would involve going to Hong Kong. He said the first sequel would take place five years after the original and would feature more dancing and a Beat-Beat Revelation tournament. He also compared the sequel's plot to that of Escape from L.A. Trost also teased the possibility of a fourth film to come when he was older, comparing it to Rocky Balboa. In August 2013, Trost said that both he and the film's investors had not received any money from The FP, and "probably never will". He further stated that it was challenging "to figure out a way to get people to fund a sequel to a movie that recouped zero dollars".

In July 2017, Trost started an Indiegogo campaign to raise additional funds for the film, now titled Beats of Rage: The FP 2. The first thirty minutes had already been shot at the time of the posting, and the fundraising goal was set at $20,000, which was surpassed with over $34,000 donated. In April 2018, a synopsis and poster were released for the film, now simply titled Beats of Rage. The film was released later in 2018. The film follows the events of The FP, and features Trost, Hsu, Barrera, and Principe reprising their roles from the first film, alongside new cast members Mike O'Gorman, Tallay Wickham, and Bru Miller. Beats of Rage again features JTRO and KCDC trying to save the world from an alcohol withdrawal by competing in the titular Beat-Beat Revelation tournament against AK-47, the leader of The Wastes.

== Release ==
FP2: Beats of Rage premiered at Fantastic Fest on September 22, 2018. It was later released to Amazon Prime Video and Vimeo on May 23, 2019. The Vimeo version, titled the "DeLOOXE Edition", includes deleted scenes, four making-of featurettes, and a commentary track.
