= The Righteous Gemstones (The Righteous Gemstones episode) =

- The Righteous Gemstones episode
- Episode no.: Season 1 Episode 1
- Directed by: Danny McBride
- Written by: Danny McBride
- Cinematography by: Brandon Trost
- Editing by: Justin Bourret
- Original release date: August 18, 2019
- Running time: 62 minutes

Guest appearances
- Dermot Mulroney as Pastor John Wesley Seasons; Jennifer Nettles as Aimee-Leigh Gemstone; Scott MacArthur as Scotty; Jody Hill as Levi; James DuMont as Chad; Troy Anthony Hogan as Matthew; J. Larose as Gregory

Episode chronology
← Previous —	Next → "Is This the Man Who Made the Earth Tremble"

"The Righteous Gemstones" is the series premiere of the American dark comedy crime television series The Righteous Gemstones. The episode was written and directed by series creator and lead actor Danny McBride. It was released on HBO on August 18, 2019.

The series follows a family of televangelists and megachurch pastors led by widowed patriarch Eli Gemstone. The main focus is Eli and his immature children, Jesse, Kelvin and Judy, all of whom face challenges in their lives. The episode introduces the characters, especially a long-running arc where Jesse is blackmailed for an incriminating video.

According to Nielsen Media Research, the episode was seen by an estimated 0.593 million household viewers and gained a 0.2 ratings share among adults aged 18–49. The episode received mostly positive reviews from critics, who praised the characters, dark humor, writing and potential. Many favorably compared it to McBride's previous series, Eastbound & Down and Vice Principals.

== Plot ==
In Chengdu, the televangelist and megachurch pastor family, the Gemstones, hold a 24-hour baptism marathon. The patriarch, Eli (John Goodman), is annoyed by his children, Jesse (Danny McBride) and Kelvin (Adam DeVine), who constantly fight each other. They return home to South Carolina, where Eli's daughter, Judy (Edi Patterson), expresses disappointment that she is often excluded from the trips.

The family lives in a complex terrace, all in separate mansions. Jesse returns to his mansion with his wife Amber (Cassidy Freeman), who always supports every decision he makes. While his relationship with his youngest son, Abraham (Gavin Munn), is normal, he has a hard time dealing with his middle son, Pontius (Kelton DuMont). One of his arguments with Pontius reveals that Jesse's oldest son, Gideon, ran away years ago. Kelvin lives with his roommate, Keefe Chambers (Tony Cavalero), an ex-satanist who works as a security guard at the Gemstones’ church. Judy lives with her fiancé, Benjamin Jason "BJ" Barnes (Tim Baltz), and their relationship proves to be fairly mediocre. Eli is widowed and still misses his wife, Aimee-Leigh (Jennifer Nettles), often thinking about her during dinner and watching old videos of themselves.

Jesse is contacted by a blackmailer, who reveals that he is in possession of an incriminating video of Jesse snorting cocaine while partying with his friends and prostitutes, demanding to see him at a deserted parking lot. There, a man with a devil mask demands that he pays $1 million the following Sunday, or the video will be released to the media and ruin Jesse's career. The next day at the Gemstone Salvation Center, Eli is visited by four reverends, led by John Wesley Seasons (Dermot Mulroney). Seasons is concerned that Eli's plan to expand into Locust Grove will drive their smaller churches out of business; Eli refuses to cede to their demands. Unable to find money, Jesse is forced to confess to Kelvin and his buddies about the video, asking his brother to withdraw $500,000 to avoid suspicion. Kelvin refuses to help, as he is certain Eli watches all of his moves.

On Sunday, the Gemstones gather to eat at a restaurant after church. Seasons confronts Eli for his actions at Locust Grove, but Eli mocks the fact that his followers never supported him. Jesse and Kelvin get into a fight and both end up getting slapped by Eli. Jesse later confides to Kelvin that Seasons may be the blackmailer, and that he intends to expose him. That night, Jesse and his buddy don ski masks to attack Seasons at his house. However, Seasons surprises them with a shotgun, wounding one of them and forcing them to flee. Due to the severe blood loss, they leave in a van for the hospital.

Jesse calls Kelvin, only to discover that Judy already knows about the video. He laments not having the money until Judy offers to pay it herself. Kelvin and Judy go to the Gemstone Salvation Center, where Judy retrieves embezzled money she has hidden over the years. They drive with Jesse to the parking lot, meeting with the blackmailer and his driver. After dropping the money, the blackmailer hands over a hard drive containing the video. Seeing that he brought Kelvin and Judy, the masked man suggests that he may continue blackmailing them. As he takes the money, Jesse and Kelvin attack the blackmailer. The siblings then go back to the car, just as the driver shoots at them. In a panic, Judy accidentally drives over the blackmailer, forcing the driver to leave his car to check on him. Jesse then takes the wheel and goes back to run over the driver, and the siblings flee the parking lot.

== Production ==
=== Development ===
In July 2019, HBO confirmed that the episode would be titled "The Righteous Gemstones", and that it would be written and directed by series creator and lead actor Danny McBride. This was McBride's first writing credit, and his first directing credit.

== Reception ==
=== Viewers ===
In its original American broadcast, "The Righteous Gemstones" was seen by an estimated 0.593 million household viewers with a 0.2 in the 18-49 demographics. This means that 0.2 percent of all households with televisions watched the episode.

=== Critical reviews ===
"The Righteous Gemstones" received mostly positive reviews from critics. Kyle Fowle of The A.V. Club gave the episode an "A–" grade and wrote, "'The Righteous Gemstones' is a near-perfect setup for the series. It establishes the uneasy relationships at the heart of the family while also teeing up a couple mysteries for later on. It dabbles in a critique of the empty religious despotism that's corroding communities in parts of America while leaving room for something more scathing in future episodes. It's clear, concise, and funny as hell, and worth a trip to the altar every Sunday."

Nick Harley of Den of Geek gave the episode a 4 star rating out of 5 and wrote, "Heavier on plot than likely anyone predicted, The Righteous Gemstones seems like it can spread in many different directions. McBride has indicated that, unlike his previous HBO series, he doesn't have a set expiration date for the show, and that Gemstones could stretch on for several seasons. Based on the amount of thought that looks to have gone into everything right down to the characters' pitch-perfect outfits and hair styles, I wouldn't bet against him."

Kevin Lever of Telltale TV gave the episode a 4.5 star rating out of 5 and wrote, "But at the end of the episode, driving away from running over not one, but two blackmailers, the three siblings are there for each other, and it's what matters most. It likely won't last long, and will lead to more squabbling, but it's single moments like that that make The Righteous Gemstones elevated into something special." Thomas Alderman of Show Snob wrote, "As comedy pilots go, it isn't the most terrific or funny I've seen. Occasionally, the humor or on-screen symbolism or nods and Easter eggs are intentionally subtle. That contrast is another definite McBride-esque style, mixing the shocking with dry comedic elements. Though it is funny, this isn't a rollercoaster ride of belly laughs – it's clever observational perception to a high degree."
