= Chris Coy =

American actor (born 1986)

- Born: Christopher James Coy; May 1, 1986 (age 40); Louisville, Kentucky, U.S.
- Occupation: Actor
- Years active: 2007–present
- Spouse: Alice Coy (m. 2011)
- Children: 2

Christopher James Coy (born May 1, 1986) is an American actor. He is known for portraying L.P. Everett on HBO's Treme (2012–2013), Martin on AMC's The Walking Dead (2014–2015), Calvin Bunker on Cinemax's Banshee (2015–2016), Paul Hendrickson on HBO's The Deuce (2017–2019), and Jasper Baker on Prime Video's The Peripheral (2022).

== Career ==
He is perhaps best known for playing L.P. Everett on the HBO series Treme and Barry Horowitz on the HBO series True Blood. He also had recurring roles as a cannibal named Martin in season five of The Walking Dead and Calvin Bunker in Banshee. He has also appeared in Hostel: Part III, Sx Tape, Deliver Us from Evil, and The Barber. He appeared in the Amazon Prime Video series The Peripheral.

== Personal life ==
Originally from Louisville, Kentucky, he grew up in Okolona, a census designated area in the city, where he attended Laukhuf Elementary School. An only child, he later moved to Florida from Kentucky with his grandparents. At seventeen, he chose to move to Los Angeles to pursue either acting or music. Once in Los Angeles, his love of movies and film led him to begin to audition for acting roles.

Today, Coy lives with his two children and wife, Alice in Thousand Oaks, California. He has two dogs.

== Filmography ==
=== Film ===
| Year | Title | Role | Notes |
|---|---|---|---|
| 2007 | In One Frame | Best Friend | Short film |
| 2009 | The Camel's Back | J.T. | |
| 2010 | Greenberg | Guy at Gallery | |
| 2010 | Piranhas | Andy | Short film |
| 2011 | Hostel: Part III | Travis | |
| 2011 | Little Birds | David Riley | |
| 2011 | Rogue River | Andrew | |
| 2013 | Sx Tape | Bobby | |
| 2014 | Deliver Us from Evil | Jimmy Tratner | |
| 2014 | Kristy | Blue Hoodie | |
| 2014 | The Barber | John McCormack | |
| 2015 | The Culling | Hank | |
| 2017 | Detroit | Detective Thomas | |
| 2018 | The Front Runner | Kevin Sweeney | |
| 2018 | Trial by Fire | Daniels | |
| 2018 | Discarnate | Travis Sherman | |
| 2020 | The Killing of Two Lovers | Derek | |
| 2020 | Cowboys | Jerry | |
| 2023 | The Absence of Eden | Dobbins | |
| 2026 | The End of Oak Street | | Uncredited |

=== Television ===
| Year | Title | Role | Notes |
|---|---|---|---|
| 2009 | Numb3rs | Beastie Boy | Episode: "Sneakerhead" |
| 2009 | Monk | Second Slacker | Episode: "Mr. Monk and the Foreign Man" |
| 2009 | Sons of Anarchy | Alex Franklin | Episode: "Fa Guan" |
| 2009 | CSI: NY | Joe Ross | Episode: "Second Chances" |
| 2009–2011 | True Blood | Barry the Bellboy | 5 episodes |
| 2010 | FlashForward | Ross Weber | Episode: "Let No Man Put Asunder" |
| 2010 | CSI: Crime Scene Investigation | Melvin Dodge | Episode: "Field Mice" |
| 2010 | Rizzoli & Isles | Drew Beckett | Episode: "The Beast in Me" |
| 2011 | The Mentalist | Foley | Episode: "Red Queen" |
| 2011 | Justified | Bobby Green | Episode: "Blaze of Glory" |
| 2011 | Law & Order: Los Angeles | Dave Harlin | Episode: "East Pasadena" |
| 2012 | Law & Order: Special Victims Unit | Peter | Episode: "Friending Emily" |
| 2012 | Hawaii Five-0 | Jesse Hills | Episode: "Mohai" |
| 2012 | Castle | Zeke | Episode: "Swan Song" |
| 2012 | Emily Owens M.D. | Conor McCall | Episode: "Emily and... the Tell-Tale Heart" |
| 2012–2013 | Treme | L.P. Everett | Main role (seasons 3–4); 12 episodes |
| 2014 | Criminal Minds | Russell Homes | Episode: "Rabid" |
| 2014 | Bones | Graham Breslin | Episode: "The Repo Man in the Septic Tank" |
| 2014 | Perception | Alex White | Episode: "Silence" |
| 2014–2015 | The Walking Dead | Martin | 4 episodes |
| 2015 | NCIS | Davis Riley | Episode: "We Build, We Fight" |
| 2015 | The Messengers | Tom | Episode: "Why We Fight" |
| 2015–2016 | Banshee | Calvin Bunker | 9 episodes |
| 2017 | Lethal Weapon | Dino Brand | Episode: "Brotherly Love" |
| 2017 | Halt and Catch Fire | Bobby Aron | Episode: "A Connection Is Made" |
| 2017 | Homeland | Rudy | Episode: "alt.truth" |
| 2017 | Kingdom | Cody | 2 episodes |
| 2017–2019 | The Deuce | Paul Hendrickson | 24 episodes |
| 2018 | Castle Rock | Boyd | 4 episodes |
| 2018 | Code Black | Larry Green | Episode: "Third Year" |
| 2020–2021 | Station 19 | Wicklund | 3 episodes |
| 2021 | Lucifer | Alan | Episode: "Nothing Ever Changes Around Here" |
| 2022 | The Peripheral | Jasper Baker | 8 episodes |
| 2022 | Women of the Movement | J. W. Milam | 5 episodes |
| 2023 | Accused | Jaime | Episode: "Robyn's Story" |
| 2023 | Lawmen: Bass Reeves | Wylie Dolliver | 3 episodes |
| 2025 | Black Rabbit | Babbitt | 5 episodes |
| 2026 | Lanterns | "Waylon Sanders" | Episode: "Pilot” |
