= James Remar =

American actor (born 1953)

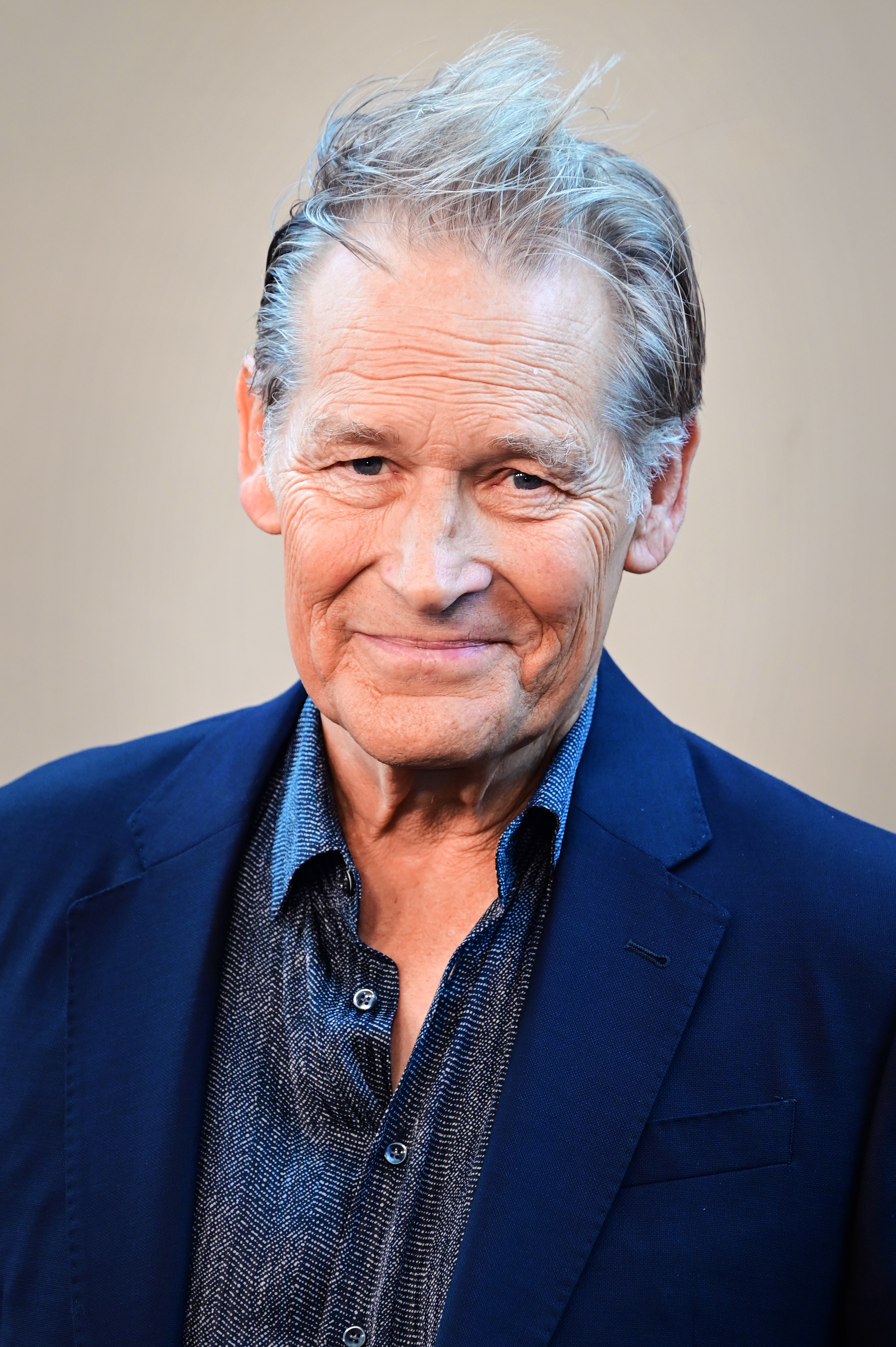
- Remar in 2026
- Born: William James Remar; December 31, 1953 (age 72); Boston, Massachusetts, U.S.
- Occupation: Actor
- Years active: 1978–present
- Spouse: Atsuko Remar (m. 1984)
- Children: 2

William James Remar (born December 31, 1953) is an American actor. Highlights of his career in film include his portrayals of Ajax in The Warriors (1979), Albert Ganz in 48 Hrs. (1982), Dutch Schultz in The Cotton Club (1984), Nestor in Band Of The Hand (1986), and Jack Duff in Miracle on 34th Street (1994). In television, he is best known for playing Richard Wright in Sex and the City (2001–2004), and Harry Morgan, the father of the title character, in Dexter (2006–2013) and Dexter: Resurrection (2025). Since 2009, he has done voice-over work in ads for Lexus luxury cars. Remar studied acting at the Neighborhood Playhouse School of the Theatre in New York City.

Remar's more recent roles include Frank Gordon in Gotham from 2016 to 2019; Peter Gambi in Black Lightning from 2018 to 2021; Secretary of War Henry L. Stimson in Oppenheimer in 2023 and General Francis Shaw in It: Welcome to Derry (2025).

== Early life ==
William James Remar was born in Boston, Massachusetts, on December 31, 1953. He is the son of Elizabeth (née Boyle), who worked in mental health affairs for the state of Massachusetts, and Roy Remar, who was an attorney. His father was of Russian-Jewish descent, while his mother was a native of England and of Irish descent. He has three sisters and two brothers. Remar grew up with his family in Newton, Massachusetts.

Remar dropped out of high school when he was 15, although he attended what he described as "kind of an alternative school" for a year afterwards. He then traveled around the United States, briefly playing guitar in a rock band. Eventually, he returned home and went back to high school, although he decided not to attend college after graduating. Remar has said he decided to become an actor when he was 20; after he was laid off from his job as a roofer, he remembered a previous job performing at a summer camp, and said he would give himself three years to attempt an acting career before he would try something else.

In Florida, Remar earned a role in a state production of Cross and Sword. Afterwards, he studied at the Neighborhood Playhouse School of the Theatre, but was not asked back after his first year, which he described as "a devastating experience". Remar continued searching for other acting jobs, eventually landing the part of Kenickie in a touring production of Grease, and also performed at the Ensemble Studio Theatre, before making his film debut in On the Yard.

== Career ==
=== Films ===
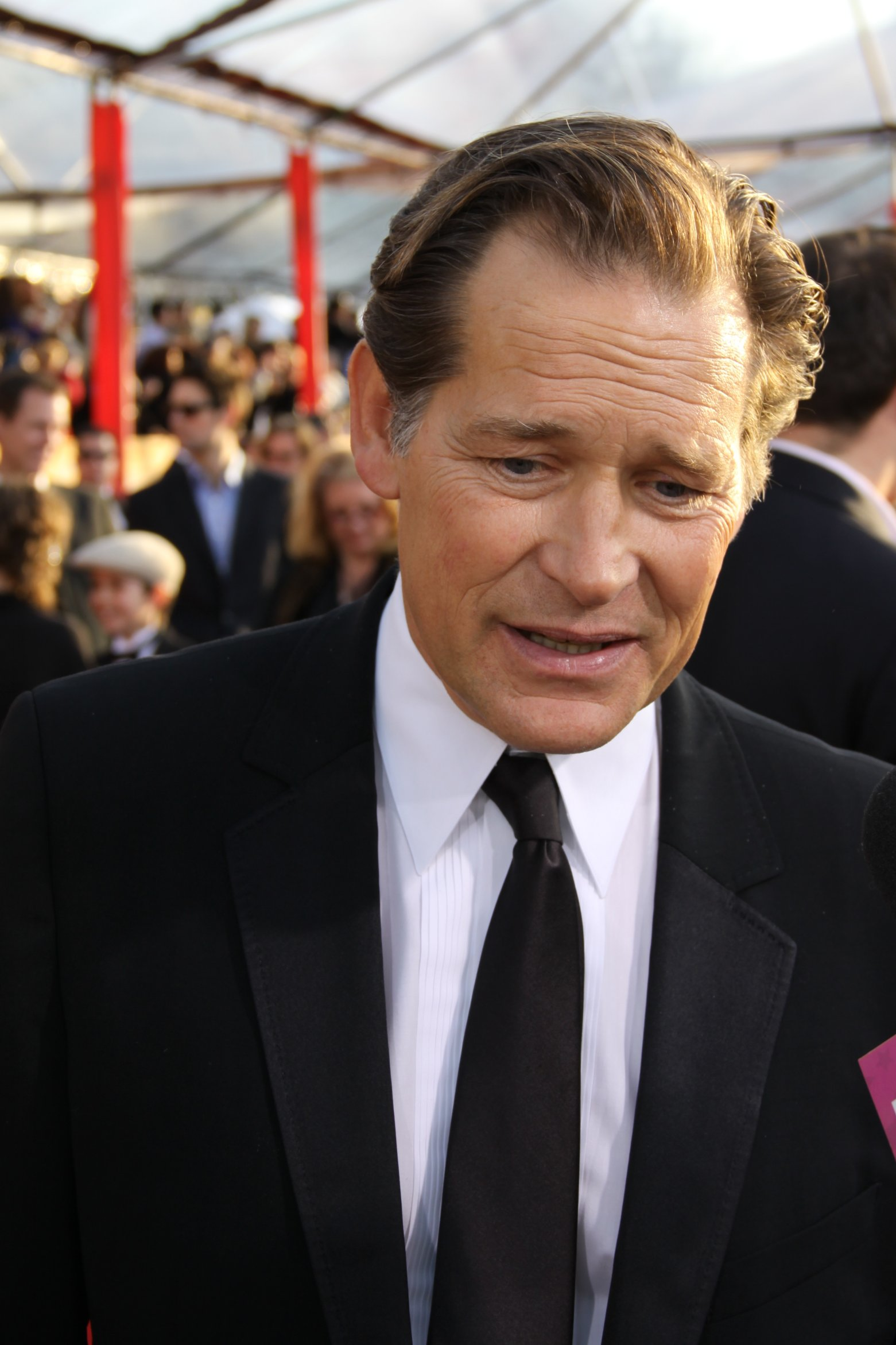
Remar at the 2010 Screen Actors Guild Awards

Remar has spent the majority of his film career playing villains. He portrayed the violent gang member Ajax in the cult film The Warriors (1979), and the murdering sociopath Albert Ganz in the hit 48 Hrs. (1982). Both films were directed by Walter Hill. Remar also played real-life 1930s-era gangster Dutch Schultz in The Cotton Club (1984).

In contrast to these roles, Remar starred in the film Windwalker (1980) as the young Cheyenne Windwalker, for which he spoke his lines in the Cheyenne language. He also portrayed a gay man in the film Cruising (1980). That same year, Remar had a cameo in the Western The Long Riders (1980) in a bar fight scene with David Carradine.

He was the star of the film Quiet Cool (1986) and was cast as Corporal Hicks in the science-fiction/horror film Aliens (1986), but was replaced by Michael Biehn shortly into filming after being arrested for drug possession. At least one piece of footage featuring Remar made it into the final version of the film: when the Marines enter the processing station and the camera tilts down from the Alien nest, though Remar is not seen in close-up. He is also filmed from the back as the Marines first enter the compound on LV-426 and when "Hicks" approaches the cocooned woman, again filmed from the rear so the viewer is unable to tell it is Remar and not Michael Biehn.

He played Quill, one of the main villains in The Phantom (1996). In 1994 he played a supporting role in the film Renaissance Man, then appeared in Mortal Kombat Annihilation (1997), the sequel to the film Mortal Kombat (1995), taking over the role of Raiden from Christopher Lambert. He then followed this with a role in the direct-to-video science fiction film Robo Warriors (1996). Other films include Psycho (1998), in which he played the patrolman, Drugstore Cowboy (1989), Tales from the Darkside: The Movie (1990), Wedlock (1991), Boys on the Side (1995), The Quest (1996), Rites of Passage (1999), Hellraiser: Inferno (2000), 2 Fast 2 Furious (2003), Fear X (2003), Blade: Trinity (2004), and The Girl Next Door (2004). He played a brief role as General Bratt in the prologue of Pineapple Express (2008). He also had a role in the horror film The Unborn (2009), alongside C.S. Lee, who portrays Vince Masuka in Dexter. He also played the father of Olivia Grey in Feed (2017).

Remar appeared in the film X-Men: First Class (2011) and voiced the Autobot Sideswipe in the film Transformers: Dark of the Moon (2011), replacing André Sogliuzzo. He was also cast in the heist film Setup (2011) and starred in the film Arena (2011).

Remar played two different, unrelated characters in Quentin Tarantino's film Django Unchained (2012): Ace Speck and Butch Pooch. He starred, alongside Emma Roberts, Lucy Boynton, and Lauren Holly, in the thriller film The Blackcoat's Daughter (2015).

=== Television ===
Remar's television appearances include the series Miami Vice, Hill Street Blues, Sex and the City (as the on-again, off-again boyfriend of Kim Cattrall's character), Tales from the Crypt, Jericho, Third Watch, Justice League Unlimited, and Battlestar Galactica. He also appeared as a possessed mental patient in The X-Files ninth-season episode "Dæmonicus". He starred as Tiny Bellows on the short-lived television series The Huntress (2000–2001). He appeared in the miniseries The Grid (2004) as Hudson "Hud", the love interest of Julianna Margulies's character. He had a recurring guest role in the 2006 television series Jericho on CBS. Remar guest-starred in the CBS crime drama Numbers, playing a weapons dealer who later turns good and helps the FBI.

From 2006 to 2013, Remar co-starred in Dexter on Showtime. He was nominated for a Saturn Award for Best Supporting Actor for his portrayal of Dexter Morgan's adoptive father, Harry Morgan.

In 2010, he played guest roles as Giuseppe Salvatore in The CW series The Vampire Diaries and as James Ermine, a general for Jericho, a black-ops military contractor, on FlashForward.

He also voiced Vilgax in the animated television series Ben 10: Alien Force and Ben 10: Ultimate Alien, replacing Steve Blum. He guest-starred in Private Practice in 2010, playing a physician named Gibby, who works with Doctors Without Borders. On July 23, 2017, Remar was cast as Peter Gambi on the superhero drama Black Lightning. The series would run for four seasons from January 2018 to May 2021, Remar's Gambi a series regular for its entirety. He would then be cast in a recurring role on The Rookie as Tom Bradford, Tim’s father. He was later cast as General Shaw in It: Welcome to Derry, a television series prequel to the 2017 supernatural horror film It, which released on HBO in 2025. In December 2024, it was reported that he would reprise his role as Harry Morgan in Dexter: Resurrection, which premiered in 2025.

== Personal life ==
In 1984, he married Atsuko Remar. They have two children. He speaks conversational Japanese.

== Filmography ==
=== Film ===
Year	Title	Role	Notes	Reference(s)
1978	On the Yard	Larson		
1979	The Warriors	Ajax		
1980	Cruising	Gregory		
1980	The Long Riders	Sam Starr		
1980	Windwalker	Young Windwalker		
1982	Partners	Edward K. Petersen		
1982	48 Hrs.	Albert Ganz		
1984	The Cotton Club	Dutch Schultz		
1986	The Clan of the Cave Bear	Creb		
1986	Band of the Hand	Nestor		
1986	Quiet Cool	Officer Joe Dylanne		
1987	Rent-A-Cop	Dancer		
1989	The Dream Team	Gianelli		
1989	Drugstore Cowboy	Gentry		
1990	Tales from the Darkside: The Movie	Preston	Segment: "Lover's Vow"	
1991	White Fang	"Beauty" Smith		
1991	Session Man	McQueen	Short film	
1992	The Tigress	Andrei		
1993	Fatal Instinct	Max Shady		
1993	Blink	Thomas Ridgely		
1994	Renaissance Man	Captain Tom Murdoch		
1994	Miracle on 34th Street	Jack Duff		
1995	Boys on the Side	Alex		
1995	The Surgeon	Dr. Benjamin Hendricks		
1995	Judge Dredd	Monroe, Block Warlord	Uncredited	
1995	Wild Bill	Donnie Lonigan		
1996	The Quest	Maxie Devine		
1996	The Phantom	Quill		
1997	Mortal Kombat Annihilation	Lord Raiden		
1998	Psycho	Highway Patrolman		
1999	Rites of Passage	Frank Dabbo		
2000	Blowback	John Matthew Whitman / Schmidt	Direct-to-video	
2000	What Lies Beneath	Warren Feur		
2000	Hellraiser: Inferno	Dr. Paul Gregory	Direct-to-video	
2003	Fear X	Peter		
2003	2 Fast 2 Furious	United States Customs Agent Markham		
2003	Duplex	Chick		
2004	The Girl Next Door	Hugo Posh		
2004	Blade: Trinity	FBI Agent Ray Cumberland		
2007	Ratatouille	Larousse	Voice	
2008	Pineapple Express	General Bratt		
2009	The Unborn	Gordon Beldon		
2009	2B	Tom Mortlake		
2009	Endless Bummer	Sam Kramer	Direct-to-video	
2010	Gun	Detective Rogers	Direct-to-video	
2010	Red	Gabriel Singer		
2011	The FP	Narrator	Voice	
2011	X-Men: First Class	United States General		
2011	Transformers: Dark of the Moon	Sideswipe	Voice	
2011	Setup	William Long	Direct-to-video	
2011	Arena	FBI Agent Sam McCarty / Sam Lord	Direct-to-video	
2011	All Superheroes Must Die	Rickshaw		
2012	Django Unchained	"Ace" Speck, Butch Pooch		
2013	Horns	Derrick Perrish		
2014	Persecuted	John Luther		
2014	Lap Dance	Patrick Moore		
2015	The Blackcoat's Daughter	Bill		
2015	Eden	Coach DaFoe		
2015	Papa: Hemingway in Cuba	Santo Trafficante Jr.		
2016	USS Indianapolis: Men of Courage	Rear Admiral William S. Parnell		
2017	The Night Watchmen	Randall		
2017	The Saint	Arnold Valecross	Direct-to-video	
2017	Feed	Tom Grey		
2018	Speed Kills	Meyer Lansky	Direct-to-video	
2019	Once Upon a Time in Hollywood	"Ugly Owl" Hoot	Scene deleted	
2020	Dead Reckoning	Agent Richard Cantrell	Direct-to-video	
2022	The Noel Diary	Scott Turner		
2023	Oppenheimer	Henry L. Stimson		
2024	Drugstore June	Arnold		
2024	Megalopolis	Charles Cothope		
2024	Transformers One	Zeta Prime	Voice	
2026	They Will Kill You	Pig's Head	Voice	
2026	The Odyssey	Tiresias		

=== Television ===
Year	Title	Role	Notes	Reference(s)
1981	Hill Street Blues	Cooper	Episode: "Rites of Spring"	
1984	The Mystic Warrior	Pesla	Television film	
1985	Miami Vice	Robbie Cann	Episode: "Buddies"	
1987	The Equalizer	Tremayne	Episode: "High Performance"	
1987	The Hitchhiker	Ron	Episode: "Homebodies"	
1987	Crime Story	Smilin' Jack	Episode: "Blast from the Past"	
1989	Desperado: The Outlaw Wars	John Sikes	Television film	
1990	Kojak: None So Blind	Wolfgang Reiger	Television film	
1990	Night Visions	Sergeant Thomas Mackey	Television film	
1991	Tales from the Crypt	Red Buckley	Episode: "Dead Wait"	
1991	Brotherhood of the Gun	Frank Weir	Television film	
1991	Wedlock	Sam	Television film	
1992	Strangers	Bernard	Television film	
1992	Indecency	Mick Clarkson	Television film	
1996	Cutty Whitman	Cutty Whitman	Television film	
1997	Total Security	Frank Cisco	13 episodes	
1998	Inferno	Dr. Coleman West	Television film	
1999	Walker, Texas Ranger	Keith Bolt	Episode: "The Principal"	
2000	18 Wheels of Justice	Mitch Davis / "Gabriel"	Episode: "Wages of Sin"	
2000–2001	The Huntress	Tiny Bellows	28 episodes	
2001	Nash Bridges	Mark Lee Page	Episode: "Fair Game"	
2001	7th Heaven	James Carver	2 episodes	
2001	Strong Medicine	Guy Falls	Episode: "Systemic"	
2001	The X-Files	Professor Josef Kobold	Episode: "Dæmonicus"	
2001	Justice League	Lead Manhunter	Voice; episode: "In Blackest Night"	
2001–2004	Sex and the City	Richard Wright	12 episodes	
2002	The Twilight Zone	Alois Hitler	Episode: "Cradle of Darkness"	
2002	Third Watch	Detective Madjanski	4 episodes	
2003	Peacemakers	Cole Hawkins	Episode: "Legend of the Gun"	
2003	Without a Trace	Lucas Vohland	Episode: "Confidence"	
2004	The Grid	Hudson "Hud" Benoit	Miniseries	
2004	The Survivors Club	Roan Griffin	Television film	
2004	Ike: Countdown to D-Day	General Omar Bradley	Television film	
2004	Meltdown	Colonel Boggs	Television film	
2004	North Shore	Vincent Colville	21 episodes	
2005	Battlestar Galactica	Meier	2 episodes	
2005–2006	Justice League Unlimited	Hawkman, Shadow Thief	Voice; 2 episodes	
2006	CSI: Miami	Capt. Quentin Taylor	Episode: "Open Water"	
2006	Thief	Agent Patterson	Miniseries	
2006–2007	Jericho	Jonah Prowse	5 episodes	
2006–2008	The Batman	Black Mask	Voice; 3 episodes	
2006–2013	Dexter	Harry Morgan	96 episodes	
2007	Sharpshooter	Dillon	Television film	
2008	Eli Stone	Salinsky	Episode: "Praying for Time"	
2009	The Unit	Reece	Episode: "Hero"	
2009	Criminal Minds	Tom Benton	Episode: "Demonology"	
2009	The Spectacular Spider-Man	Walter Hardy	Voice; episode: "Opening Night"	
2009	The Christmas Hope	Mark Addison	Television film	
2009–2010	Batman: The Brave and the Bold	Harvey Dent / Two-Face	Voice; 2 episodes	
2009–2010	Ben 10: Alien Force	Vilgax	Voice; 7 episodes	
2010	D.R.E.A.M. Team	Shawn Murphy	Television film	
2010	Numbers	Randall Priest	Episode: "Arm in Arms"	
2010	FlashForward	James Ermine	Episode: "Blowback"	
2010	The Vampire Diaries	Giuseppe Salvatore	2 episodes	
2010	Private Practice	Gibby	Episode: "Playing God"	
2011	Human Target	Warden Cole	Episode: "Cool Hand Guerrero"	
2011	Hawaii Five-0	Elliott Connor	Episode: "Ua Hiki Mai Kapalena Pau"	
2011	Young Justice	Joar Mahkent / Icicle Sr., Wilcox	Voice; episode: "Terrors"	
2011	Pound Puppies	Sarge	Voice; episode: "The K9 Kid"	
2011–2012	Ben 10: Ultimate Alien	Vilgax	Voice, 5 episodes	
2012	Hatfields & McCoys	Joe Hatfield	Miniseries	
2013–2014	Beware the Batman	Silver Monkey	Voice; 3 episodes	
2013–2014	The Legend of Korra	Tonraq	Voice; 14 episodes	
2013–2014	Grey's Anatomy	James Evans	6 episodes	
2013–2014	Wilfred	Henry Newman	5 episodes	
2014	From Dusk till Dawn: The Series	Ray Gecko	Episode: "Boxman"	
2014–2015	State of Affairs	Syd Vaslo	9 episodes	
2016	The Shannara Chronicles	Cephalo	7 episodes	
2017	Gotham	Frank Gordon	3 episodes	
2017	NCIS: Los Angeles	Admiral Sterling Bridges	3 episodes	
2017	The Path	Kodiak	9 episodes	
2018–2021	Black Lightning	Peter Gambi	58 episodes	
2018–2023	Magnum P.I.	Captain Buck Greene	6 episodes	
2019	Animal Kingdom	Detective Andre	4 episodes	
2019	City on a Hill	Richy Ryan	5 episodes	
2021	Creepshow	Raymond Bateman	Episode: "Skeletons in the Closet"	
2021	The Rookie	Tom Bradford	Episode: "Breakdown"	
2022	Yellowstone	Kyle Fremont	Episode: "The Sting of Wisdom"	
2023	Paul T. Goldman	Lieutenant Newman	2 episodes	
2024	Dexter: Final Cut	Himself	Aftershow; episode: "Dexter: Original Sin 104 Jamie Chung & James Remar"	
2025	Dexter's Kill Room	Himself	Episode: "Harry's Code Begins — James Remar Revisits Popping Cherry"	
2025–present	Dexter: Resurrection	Harry Morgan	14 episodes	
2025	It: Welcome to Derry	General Francis Shaw	7 episodes	
2026	Trinity	President Paul Barnard	Post-production	

=== Video games ===
Year	Title	Role	Reference(s)
2005	The Warriors	Ajax	
2010	Batman: The Brave and the Bold – The Videogame	Harvey Dent / Two-Face	
2011	Killzone 3	Captain Jason Narville	
2014	Destiny	Executor Hideo, New Monarchy Merchant	
2017	Destiny 2	Executor Hideo, New Monarchy Merchant	
2022	Destiny 2: The Witch Queen	Executor Hideo, New Monarchy Merchant	

== Awards and nominations ==
Year	Award	Category	Work	Result
2007	Saturn Awards	Best Supporting Actor on Television	Dexter	Nominated
2009	Screen Actors Guild Awards	Outstanding Performance by an Ensemble in a Drama Series Shared with Preston Bailey, Julie Benz, Jennifer Carpenter, Valerie Cruz, Kristin Dattilo, Michael C. Hall, Desmond Harrington, C. S. Lee, Jason Manuel Olazabal, David Ramsey, Christina Robinson, Jimmy Smits, Lauren Vélez and David Zayas	Dexter	Nominated
2010	Screen Actors Guild Awards	Outstanding Performance by an Ensemble in a Drama Series Shared with Preston Bailey, Julie Benz, Jennifer Carpenter, Brando Eaton, Courtney Ford, Michael C. Hall, Desmond Harrington, C. S. Lee, John Lithgow, Rick Peters, Christina Robinson, Lauren Vélez and David Zayas	Dexter	Nominated
2011	Screen Actors Guild Awards	Outstanding Performance by an Ensemble in a Drama Series Shared with Jennifer Carpenter, April Lee Hernández, Michael C. Hall, Desmond Harrington, Maria Doyle Kennedy, C. S. Lee, Jonny Lee Miller, Julia Stiles, Lauren Vélez, Peter Weller and David Zayas	Dexter	Nominated
2012	San Diego Film Critics Society Awards	Best Ensemble Performance Shared with Leonardo DiCaprio, Samuel L. Jackson, Jonah Hill, Christoph Waltz, Jamie Foxx, Kerry Washington, Zoë Bell, Don Johnson, Walton Goggins and Bruce Dern	Django Unchained	Nominated
2012	Saturn Awards	The Life Career Award	—N/a	Won
2012	Screen Actors Guild Awards	Outstanding Performance by an Ensemble in a Drama Series Shared with Billy Brown, Jennifer Carpenter, Josh Cooke, Aimee Garcia, Michael C. Hall, Colin Hanks, Desmond Harrington, Rya Kihlstedt, C. S. Lee, Edward James Olmos, Luna Lauren Velez and David Zayas	Dexter	Nominated
2013	Gold Derby Awards	Ensemble Cast Shared with Dennis Christopher, Leonardo DiCaprio, Jamie Foxx, Walton Goggins, Samuel L. Jackson, Don Johnson, Christoph Waltz and Kerry Washington	Django Unchained	Nominated
2014	Behind the Voice Actors Awards	People's Choice Voice Acting Award Shared with Janet Varney, Dee Bradley Baker, David Faustino, P. J. Byrne, J. K. Simmons, Mindy Sterling, Seychelle Gabriel, Aubrey Plaza, Aaron Himelstein, John Michael Higgins, Adrian LaTourelle, Richard Riehle and Lisa Edelstein	The Legend of Korra	Won
2014	Behind the Voice Actors Awards	Television Voice Acting Award Shared with Janet Varney, Dee Bradley Baker, David Faustino, P.J. Byrne, J. K. Simmons, Mindy Sterling, Seychelle Gabriel, Aubrey Plaza, Aaron Himelstein, John Michael Higgins, Adrian LaTourelle, Richard Riehle and Lisa Edelstein	The Legend of Korra	Nominated
2014	Prism Awards	Male Performance in a Drama Series Multi-Episode Storyline	Grey's Anatomy	Nominated
2024	Screen Actors Guild Awards	Outstanding Performance by a Cast in a Motion Picture Shared with Cillian Murphy, Emily Blunt, Matt Damon, Robert Downey Jr., Florence Pugh, Josh Hartnett, Casey Affleck, Benny Safdie, David Krumholtz, Jason Clarke, Dane DeHaan, Alden Ehrenreich, Rami Malek and Kenneth Branagh	Oppenheimer	Won
2026	Saturn Awards	Best Guest Starring Role on Television	It: Welcome to Derry	Nominated

== Sources ==
- Kipp, Jeremiah (Fall 2001). "The Quiet Cool of a Gypsy Actor: An Interview with James Remar". Shock Cinema. No. 19. pp. 3–8.
