= Ian Duncan (actor) =

South African actor

- Occupation: Actor
- Notable work: Broken News

Ian Duncan is a South African actor. He is best known for playing the role of Todd Todmore on Broken News.

== Filmography ==
=== Films ===
| Year | Title | Role | Notes |
|---|---|---|---|
| 1999 | Jesus | John | TV movie |
| 2001 | She | Leo Vincey / Kallikrates | |
| 2001 | The Mists of Avalon | Accolon | |
| 2002 | San Giovanni - L'apocalisse | Demetrius | TV movie |
| 2004 | Creep | Friend | |
| 2005 | E=mc² | Charles de Breteuil | TV movie |
| 2006 | The Great San Francisco Earthquake | William Stehr | TV movie |
| 2008 | Fix | Max | |
| 2009 | Blood River | Clark | |
| 2010 | Luster | Travis Code | |
| 2010 | Next Stop Murder | Nicky | TV movie |
| 2010 | Hard Breakers | Carey | TV movie |
| 2012 | Two Jacks | Howard | |
| 2012 | Junkie | Charlie | |
| 2013 | Sx Tape | Adam | |
| 2013 | Fighting for Freedom | Jake Grove | |

=== Television ===
| Year | Title | Role | Notes |
|---|---|---|---|
| 2002 | Julius Caesar | Marcus Junius Brutus | TV miniseries |
| 2003 | Licensed by Royalty | Delmont, Margaret, Brian | English version, voice |
| 2003 | Adventure Inc. | Daniel Wainright | 1 episode |
| 2005 | Broken News | Todd Todmore | 5 episodes |
| 2005 | Ultimate Force | Hector Du Preez | 1 episode |
| 2005 | Nova | Charles de Breteuil | 1 episode |
| 2005 | Love Soup | Bob | 1 episode |
| 2008 | Samantha Who? | Cameron | 1 episode |
| 2012 | The Box | Man in the Box | TV series short |
| 2013 | Rizzoli & Isles | Tim Felding | 1 episode |

=== Video games ===
| Year | Title | Role | Notes |
|---|---|---|---|
| 2017 | Squadron 42 | TBA | Performance capture |
