= Caitlyn Folley =

American actress

Caitlyn Folley, also known as Caker Folley, is an American actress known for her role as Stacy in The FP (2011).

== Career ==
Following small roles in Speak, Happy Endings, Beautiful Loser, and Archie's Final Project, Folley was cast as the primary love interest in The FP, replacing Diana Gaeta. The film premiered at South by Southwest on March 13, 2011. In 2013, she played the lead role of Jill in Bernard Rose's Sx Tape. It premiered at the BFI London Film Festival.

== Filmography ==
=== Film ===
Year	Title	Role	Notes
2004	Speak	Randi	
2005	Happy Endings (Note: Credited as Caker Folley)	Lauren	
2008	September 12th	Samantha	Short film
2008	Dark Honeymoon	Vanessa	
2008	Beautiful Loser	Teenage Bonnie	
2009	Archie's Final Project	Party Ho	
2011	The FP	Stacy	
2013	Sx Tape	Jill	
2014	Nightmare Code	Jennifer Desmond	
2015	Other People's Children	Street Girl #1	
2017	Restraint	Angela Burroughs	

=== Television ===
Year	Title	Role	Notes
2007	Bones	Lola	Episode: "Mummy in the Maze"
