= Days of Darkness (2007 American film) =

- Directed by: Jake Kennedy
- Written by: Jake Kennedy
- Produced by: Kurt Anderson
- Starring: Tom Eplin; Sabrina Gennarino; Travis Brorsen
- Cinematography: Brandon Trost
- Edited by: William Daniels
- Music by: Jamey Scott
- Production company: Swag Entertainment
- Distributed by: Lions Gate Films
- Release date: September 21, 2007 (Visionfest)
- Running time: 90 minutes
- Country: United States
- Language: English

Days of Darkness is a 2007 American horror film written and directed by Jake Kennedy. Survivors of a zombie apocalypse, including a young couple played by Travis Brorsen and Roshelle Pattison, seek shelter in an abandoned military complex while they attempt to figure out what has caused the outbreak.

== Plot ==
After a comet passes near the earth, most of the population becomes cannibalistic zombies. Survivors gather at a military complex, where they discover that an alien parasite borne of the comet infects the zombies. The group includes Trent, a preacher, and his infected brother, Herbert; Simon, a gay man; Steve (who has been bitten on the arm) and Mimi, a young couple; Chad, a rancher; Kylie, an ex-porn star, and her daughter, Jane; two car salesmen, Slasher and DJ; and Lin, a soldier. As the infection worsens, the parasite causes men's genitals to fall off and virgin births among the females. After an unsuccessful attempt to forage for supplies that results in the deaths of several people, Steve attempts to save Mimi from the infection. As he anesthetizes her with alcohol prior to operating on her, the alien organism flees from her body. Realizing that alcohol can save them, they become drunk and use the rancher's whiskey supplies to destroy the zombies.

== Cast ==
- Tom Eplin as Chad
- Sabrina Gennarino as Lin
- Travis Brorsen as Steve
- Roshelle Pattison as Mimi
- John Lee Ames as Trent
- Bryan Rasmussen as Slasher
- Eric Stuart as DJ
- Chris Ivan Cevic as Simon
- Marian Tomas Griffin as Kylie
- Ashley Elizabeth Pierce as Jane
- William Cannon as Herbert

== Production ==
The alien parasites are based on a real-life parasitic castrator named Sacculina that preys upon crabs. The location, a decommissioned NORAD microwave station in Topanga, California, was purchased by a friend of the director. Once they had the location, the filmmakers came up with a story; the producers desired a zombie film.

== Release ==
Days of Darkness premiered at the 2007 Visionfest. Lionsgate released it direct-to-video in the US on January 8, 2008.

== Reception ==
Brian Collins of Bloody Disgusting rated it 2/5 stars and called it "a zombie movie borne out of a drunken improv class". Steve Barton of Dread Central rated it 3.5/5 stars and wrote, "Days of Darkness does just about everything right; yet, two crucial ingredients every good undead film should have are missing — good looking zombies and the appropriate amount of splatter." Daniel Benson of HorrorTalk rated it 3/5 stars and called it "an odd film that suffers from pacing issues and finishes just as things get going", though it brings new ideas to a tired genre. Writing in The Zombie Movie Encyclopedia, Volume 2, academic Peter Dendle said, "A few strange twists and some decent acting keep this humble Californian apocalypse on its feet."

== See also ==
- List of ghost films
