= Art Hsu =

American actor

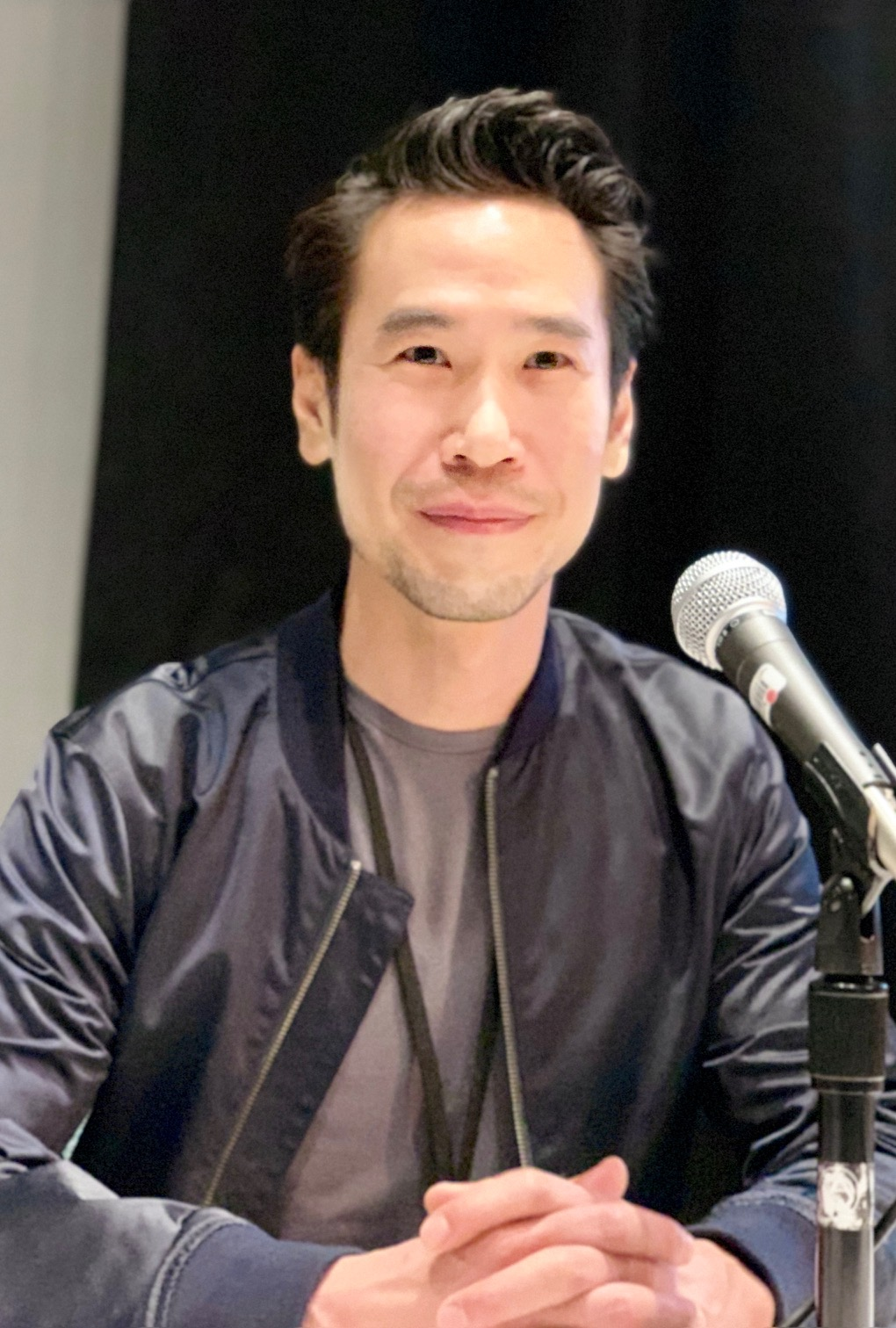
- Hsu at the 2018 L.A. Comic Con
- Born: Flushing, Queens, N.Y., U.S.
- Education: Boston College
- Occupations: Writer, Producer, Actor
- Years active: 2006–present

Art Hsu (also known as Arthur Hsu or Arthur J. Hsu) is an American actor, writer and producer. He is best known for playing KCDC in The FP film series, and Johnny Vang in Crank: High Voltage opposite Jason Statham. Other credits include FP2: Beats of Rage, The Girl from the Naked Eye, and Silver Case.

He has appeared in music videos for Danko Jones, The Game (rapper), and Slayer.

He attended La Salle Military Academy, the Drucker School of Management, and did post graduate studies at the Center of Chinese Language and Culture at Fu Jen Catholic University.

Hsu is currently preparing his next writing and producing project, "The Elixir Chronicles: Echoes Through The Ages".

He resides in Los Angeles, California.

== Filmography ==
Year	Title	Role	Notes
2006	Du Shi	John Su	Short film
2006	Honey	Michael	Short film
2006	Broken Rhyme	Gun Dealer	Feature Film
2006	Letters from Iwo Jima		Core Group Background
2007	Pirates of the Caribbean: At World's End	Crazed Asian Pirate	Uncredited
2007	The State of Sunshine	Danny	Short film
2007	Balls of Fury	Mysterious Guard	Featured Extra
2009	Love 10 to 1	Tim	Feature Film
2009	Crank: High Voltage	Johnny Vang	Feature Film
2010	Anti-Samaritan Hotline	Frank the Operator	Short film
2011	The FP	KCDC	Feature Film
2011	I Think Bad Thoughts - Danko Jones		Music video
2011	Silver Case	Business Man #2	Feature Film
2012	Me First	Father	Short film
2012	The Girl from the Naked Eye	Sammy	Feature Film
2012	Folded Hands - The Game	High Roller 2	Music video
2012	The Ballad of Danko Jones	Mr. Crowley	Short film
2013	Henchmen	Kaleb Barroga	Web Series
2013	Deference	Hagan, Producer	Short film
2014	SanFranLand	Officer Cox	Web Series
2014	Another You	Writer, Director, Producer	Short film
2015	Bad Things	Nick	Short film
2015	Bozos	Giggles	Web Series
2015	Silver Case: Director's Cut	Business Man #2	Feature Film
2016	All Superheroes Must Die 2: The Last Superhero	Detective Jones	Feature Film
2016	Apartment 407	Chinese Client	Feature Film
2016	You Against You - Slayer		Music Video
2017	Intrepid		Short Film
2018	FP2: Beats of Rage	KCDC	Feature Film
2021	Nail Gun	Sean	Short Film
2021	Pond Puppies: A Middle School Story	Jeff Hahn	Short Film
2021	FP3: Escape From Bako	KCDC	Feature Film
2021	Silence is Violence - AK		Music Video
2022	Better Daze	Thug #2	TV Pilot
2023	FP4: 4EVZ	KCDC	Feature Film
2024	Arcasia: Life in the 626	Master Pastry Chef Pong	Web Series
2026	F-Listers	Celebrity Art Hsu / Mr.Johnathan / Johnny	Feature Film; Completed
TBD	The Elixir Chronicles: Echoes Through The Ages	Writer, Producer	Feature Film; In development
