= The FP =

2011 film by Brandon Trost and Jason Trost

- Theatrical release poster
- Directed by: Brandon Trost; Jason Trost
- Screenplay by: Brandon Trost; Jason Trost
- Story by: Jason Trost
- Produced by: Christian Agypt; Brandon Barrera
- Starring: Jason Trost; Lee Valmassy; Caitlyn Folley; Art Hsu; Nick Principe; Dov Tiefenbach
- Cinematography: Brandon Trost
- Edited by: Abe Levy
- Music by: George Holdcroft
- Production companies: Secret Identity Productions; Trost Productions
- Distributed by: Drafthouse Films
- Release dates: March 13, 2011 (SXSW); March 16, 2012 (United States)
- Running time: 83 minutes
- Country: United States
- Language: English
- Budget: $45,000
- Box office: $40,557

The FP is a 2011 American comedy film written and directed by Brandon and Jason Trost. The film focuses on two gangs, the 248 and the 245, fighting for control of Frazier Park (the FP). The gangs settle their disputes by playing Beat-Beat Revelation, a music video game similar to Dance Dance Revolution. Gang member JTRO (Jason Trost) trains to defeat L Dubba E (Lee Valmassy), the leader of a rival gang. The film also features Caitlyn Folley, Art Hsu, Nick Principe and Dov Tiefenbach.

Jason Trost conceived The FP when he was 16, and developed it into a short film starring himself, Valmassy, Principe, DeBello, Brandon Barrera, Diane Gaeta, Kris Lemche and Torry Haynes in 2007. After seeing the finished film, Barrera suggested that Trost make a feature-length version. In the expanded production, Gaeta, Lemche, and Haynes were replaced with Folley, Hsu, and Bryan Goddard, respectively. Principal photography took place in Frazier Park, California in September 2008. Ron Trost—Brandon and Jason Trost's father—served as special effects supervisor and executive producer of the film, and his property was the primary filming location.

The full-length version of The FP premiered at South by Southwest on March 13, 2011, and received positive reviews. After its screening at the Fantasia Festival on July 30 that year, Drafthouse Films acquired the film for distribution. It had a limited release in 28 American theaters, beginning on March 16, 2012, and was released on home media on June 29, 2012. The theatrical release received mixed reviews and failed to recoup its production budget of US$45,000, grossing $40,557 in the United States. A sequel, FP2: Beats of Rage, was released in September 2018.

== Plot ==
In a dystopian future, rival gangs the 245 and the 248 fight for control of Frazier Park (the FP) by challenging each other in Beat-Beat Revelation, a dance-fight video game. L Dubba E, the leader of the 245 gang, battles and defeats BTRO, the leader of the 248 gang. BTRO dies as a result. His younger brother JTRO is traumatized and leaves the FP.

One year later, BTRO's best friend KCDC finds JTRO working as a lumberjack. KCDC convinces JTRO that the FP needs him because L Dubba E has taken control of the local alcohol industry and is refusing to sell alcoholic drinks to everyone. The lack of alcohol has led to an increase in methamphetamine addicts, a decrease in homeless people and, consequently, ducks. Reluctantly, JTRO returns with KCDC; he meets BLT and reunites with Stacy, an old friend. JTRO and Stacy are interrupted by L Dubba E—now Stacy's boyfriend—who is picking her up to go to a party. JTRO goes to the same party and Stacy drunkenly flirts with him. L Dubba E taunts JTRO then hits him with a baseball bat, rendering him unconscious. JTRO dreams that BTRO tells him to fight back, pushing him to challenge L Dubba E. L Dubba E declines, saying that JTRO lacks sufficient "street cred". L Dubba E demands that JTRO defeat Triple Decka 1K before he will accept JTRO's challenge.

JTRO begins a grueling training regime with BLT to regain his former level of skill. Before his match with Triple Decka 1K, BLT gives BTRO's boots to JTRO. At the match venue, JTRO is tricked into drinking alcohol tainted with methamphetamine. Despite his drug-induced visual impairment, JTRO defeats Triple Decka 1K before vomiting and passing out.

KCDC wakes JTRO, having taken him to the 248 headquarters. After JTRO's recovery, BLT takes him and KCDC shooting; they decide to take guns to JTRO's match against L Dubba E. Stacy tells JTRO that her relationship with L Dubba E began when he spiked her drink with turpentine and raped her. She continued the relationship so she could supply her father with beer to prevent him from turning to drugs. One day, JTRO hears Stacy's father assaulting her and intervenes. After a brief fight with him, JTRO persuades Stacy to leave. Immediately after their departure, L Dubba E arrives and says that he has been cheating on Stacy. Stacy decides to stay with him, which angers JTRO and causes him to end their friendship.

Later the same day, Stacy, who has been badly beaten, finds JTRO and tells him that she has ended her relationship with L Dubba E. She apologizes, and they kiss. Meanwhile, L Dubba E tells his gang members to also take guns to the final match. At the venue, JTRO wears BTRO's outfit and L Dubba E taunts him. When the match begins, L Dubba E defeats JTRO in the first round but JTRO perseveres and wins the second and third rounds. L Dubba E tries to kill JTRO, triggering a lengthy gunfight between the 248 and the 245.

L Dubba E escapes the event and kidnaps Stacy. JTRO and KCDC pursue him while BLT remains at the venue. L Dubba E abruptly pulls into a gas station; JTRO follows and a fight ensues. JTRO gains the upper hand, beats L Dubba E into submission and forces him to leave the FP. Freedom to buy alcohol is restored and control of the FP is returned to the 248. JTRO and Stacy go to the pond together as ducks fly over them.

== Cast ==
- Jason Trost as JTRO, a member of the 248 gang who sets out to defeat L Dubba E. Trost wrote JTRO as the straight man and compared him to Rocky Balboa and John Rambo.
- Lee Valmassy as L Dubba E, the leader of the 245, a rival gang to the 248. Jason Trost said the character is similar to Mr. T and that Valmassy was "so embarrassed ... when he first [played the part] he almost didn't want to talk to me again". Valmassy also appears several times as a background extra.
- Caitlyn Folley as Stacy, L Dubba E's girlfriend and JTRO's old friend.
- Art Hsu as KCDC, an energetic member of the 248 and BTRO's best friend who serves as the emcee for the Beat-Beat Revelation matches. The directors said Hsu needed little direction because he played his character well. Hsu described KCDC as "the sidekick" and "the guy who ... guides people through the FP". The Trosts originally wrote the character to be more bipolar and feminine but they decided to reduce those elements for the final draft.
- Nick Principe as BLT, an abrasive member of the 248 and JTRO's trainer. Jason met Principe during the production of Laid to Rest, on which he worked as a costume assistant and as Principe's body double.
- Dov Tiefenbach as Triple Decka 1K, a Russian Beat-Beat Revelation player who faces JTRO. Tiefenbach engaged in method acting by maintaining his Russian accent on- and off-set throughout filming.
- James DeBello as Beat Box Busta Bill, a member of the 245 and one of L Dubba E's henchmen.
- Bryan Goddard as Sugga Nigga, a member of the 245 and one of L Dubba E's henchmen.
- Brandon Barrera as BTRO, JTRO's brother and the leader of the 248. Barrera appears as an extra in several scenes.

Additional cast members include Mike Sandow as Jody, Rachel Robinson as Lacy, Natalie Minx as Macy, Sean Whalen as Stacy's father, and Clifton Collins, Jr. as CC Jam. Blayne Weaver makes a cameo appearance as the owner of a gas station KCDC robs, while James Remar narrates the film's prelude. Dash Mihok played a small role in the cut of the film shown at South by Southwest, but his scenes were removed from the theatrical release. Producer Christian Agypt, first assistant director Christopher Holmes, costume designer Sarah Trost, Valmassy's younger brother Kyle, and several of the Trosts' friends appear as background extras. Brandon Trost voices a collect call operator.

== Crew ==
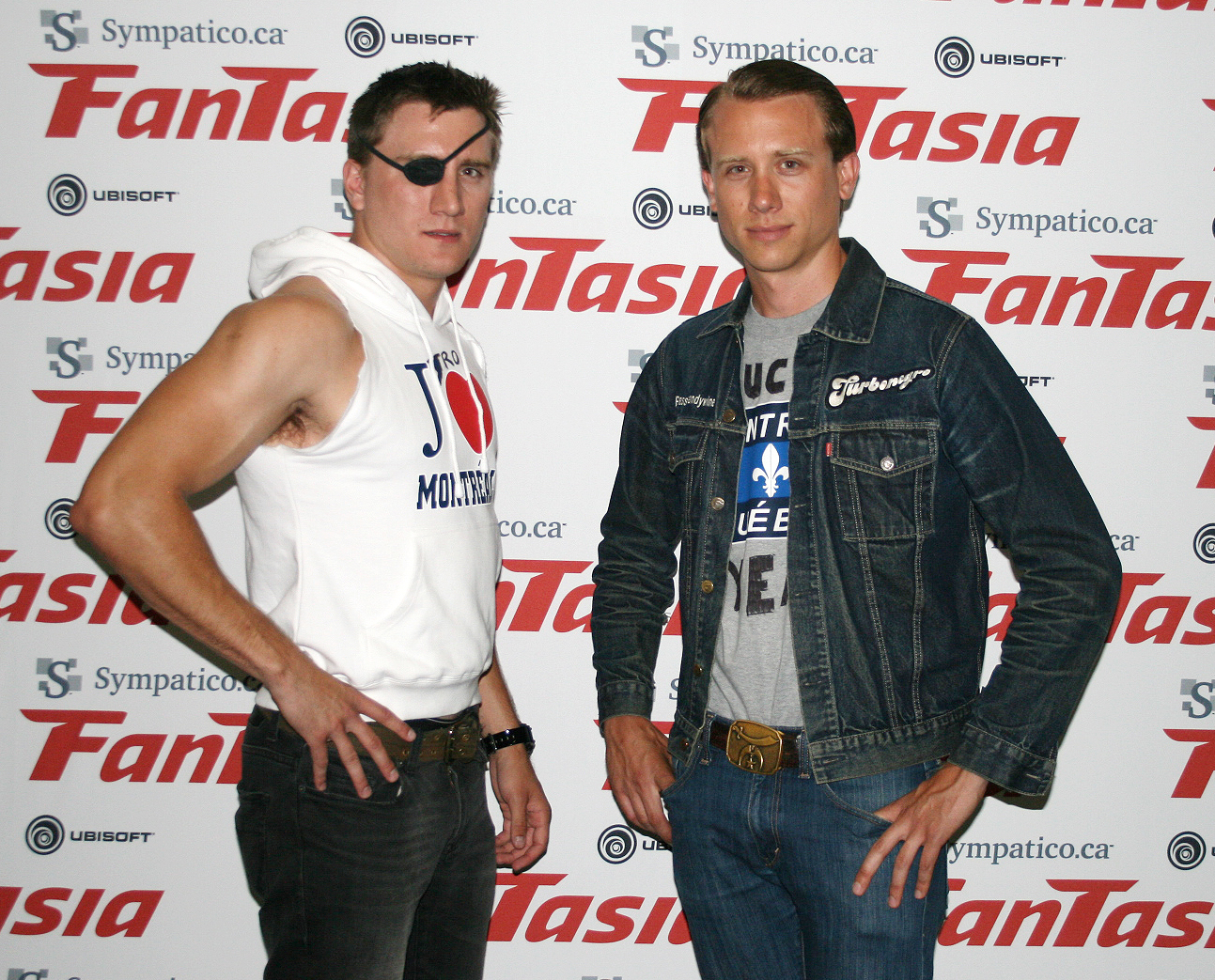
Jason (left) and Brandon Trost at the film's Fantasia Festival premiere

- Jason Trost – director, screenwriter, story writer
- Brandon Trost – director, screenwriter, cinematographer
- Christian Agypt – producer, unit production manager
- Brandon Barrera – producer
- Jason Blum – executive producer
- Steven Schneider – executive producer
- Ron Trost – executive producer, special effects coordinator
- Hal Tryon – executive producer
- Tyler B. Robinson – production designer
- Sarah Trost – costume designer
- Abe Levy – editor
- George Holdcroft – composer

== Production ==
=== Development and writing ===
Jason Trost conceived The FP when he was 16 years old and regularly played Dance Dance Revolution. He noticed people playing the game intensely and thought of treating the gameplay "like some blood sport". Trost made short films throughout high school before briefly attending film school. After dropping out, he used his tuition money to fund a short film, also titled The FP (2007). The short film was based on the original feature-length script, but only the first ten pages were filmed. The feature film recreated several shots from the short film. Trost said the feature film was inspired by what they imagined a Dance Dance Revolution film made by producer Jerry Bruckheimer would look like.

The Trost brothers asked producer Brandon Barrera to act in the short film. After seeing their work, Barrera suggested that the brothers expand the premise into a feature film. The filmmakers placed an advertisement in the Mountain Enterprise, the Mountain Communities of the Tejon Pass's newspaper, encouraging community members to call if they wanted to help with locations, catering, donations, or by serving as extras or crew members on the film.

"[W]e were playing Dance Dance Revolution, and ... Def Jam[: Fight for NY] ... [Def Jam's] vernacular just kind of worked its way in Dance Dance, and I was like, what if we mix these two worlds?"

— Jason Trost, on the inspiration of the film's dialogue

The Trost brothers named The FP after Frazier Park, California, where they grew up. Jason Trost said locals started referring to Frazier Park as "the FP" after The O.C. began airing. He also said the film's story copies that of Rocky "beat for beat" and that there were "near-plagiarism moments". All the character names were based on his friends. Over 80 percent of the dialogue was based on phrases frequently spoken by several Frazier Park residents. Much of the profanity in the script was taken from conversations overheard by costume designer Sarah Trost at parties, and what the Trost brothers thought of on set. Further inspiration for the dialogue came from Grand Theft Auto: San Andreas and Def Jam: Fight for NY, both of which Jason Trost played alongside Dance Dance Revolution.

The settings in The FP were written using the materials that the Trosts' father had on his property due to the minimal budget. Jason Trost said he had seen several low-budget films that "try to be something they aren't" and did not want to feign the production value. When they are defeated in a dance-off, characters in the film die of a "187", which is slang for murder that originated from California Penal Code. The characters' actual causes of death are unexplained in the film. The Trost brothers found depicting the deaths as ambiguous funnier and believed it would remove doubts about the film being a comedy.

=== Casting ===
Jason Trost (JTRO), Lee Valmassy (L Dubba E), Brandon Barrera (BTRO), and James DeBello (Beat Box Busta Bill) reprised their roles from the original short film, while Diane Gaeta (Stacy), Kris Lemche (KCDC), and Torry Haynes (Sugga Nigga) were replaced with Caitlyn Folley, Art Hsu, and Bryan Goddard, respectively. Goddard was cast as a "rite of passage" for being a noteworthy resident of Frazier Park. Mike Sandow, who portrays Jody, originally had a larger part in the film but his scenes were almost entirely edited out for pacing reasons.

Most of the cast were friends of the Trosts. James Remar, a friend of the Trosts since childhood, agreed to narrate the film's opening. The brothers had met Remar on the set of Mortal Kombat Annihilation, on which their father Ron worked as the special effects supervisor. Brandon Trost knew Hsu and Clifton Collins, Jr. after working with them on Crank: High Voltage (2009) and invited them to join The FP's cast.

=== Costume design ===
Sean Whalen as Stacy's father. Sarah Trost designed his character to look transsexual. Whalen agreed to wear anything if he could have his nipple exposed.

Sarah Trost was the costume designer for The FP; she designed the costumes using fashions local to Frazier Park as her first influence. She was also inspired by the fashions of Elvis Presley, and the films Double Dragon, Rocky, Mad Max, The Warriors, 8 Mile, Escape from New York, X-Men, as well as the works of John Carpenter. Trost based the opposing gangs' outfits on American military uniforms of the American Civil War era. The 245's outfits were based on the uniforms of the Confederate Army, while the 248's outfits were based on those of the Union Army. The flags of the gangs were also based on those of the Confederacy and the Union. Trost designed the 245 costumes to look clean and the 248 costume to appear gritty. Most of the costumes were made from materials available to the crew; L Dubba E's costumes were made from jumpsuits. The boots worn by JTRO and BTRO were snow expedition boots. Most of the base clothing came from thrift stores, Sarah Trost's fabric storage, and the Trost's childhood clothing.

Trost designed the costumes to be distinct from one another. JTRO and BTRO wear very similar costumes, the only noticeable difference being a color inversion. Both costumes had American flag-like emblems on the backs of their jackets, further enforcing the identification of the 248 with the Union. At the end of the film, JTRO takes BTRO's outfit, which required Trost to readjust it for the height difference between Jason Trost and Brandon Barrera, who portray JTRO and BTRO, respectively. As the film progresses, JTRO's color scheme changes from black and blue to military green to reflect his "becoming one with BLT". KCDC's costume design features ducks, referencing a speech in the film in which he notes the lack of ducks in the FP. Stacy and her father are both dressed to be somewhat transsexual, though it is more prominent in her father's character. Whalen told Trost he would wear anything as long as his nipple was exposed at all times. Stacy also wears an I Love New York shirt, with the words New York covered in duct tape and "The FP" written over it with a marker. CC Jam's costume was designed to be as colorful as possible to emulate rave culture.

=== Filming ===
Principal photography took place in Frazier Park, California, with a budget of $45,000. It began in September 2008 and lasted 20 days, most of which were spent on Ron Trost's property. Scenes set in BLT's house were filmed at the Trosts' childhood home, while the look of his basement was designed using the inside of a shipping container. Many set pieces were taken either from items Ron had collected or from other film sets. The Trost brothers split directorial duties between themselves; Brandon focused on visuals and Jason focused on the performances and story. Valmassy directed a driving scene featuring himself and Folley when the Trosts were briefly unavailable.

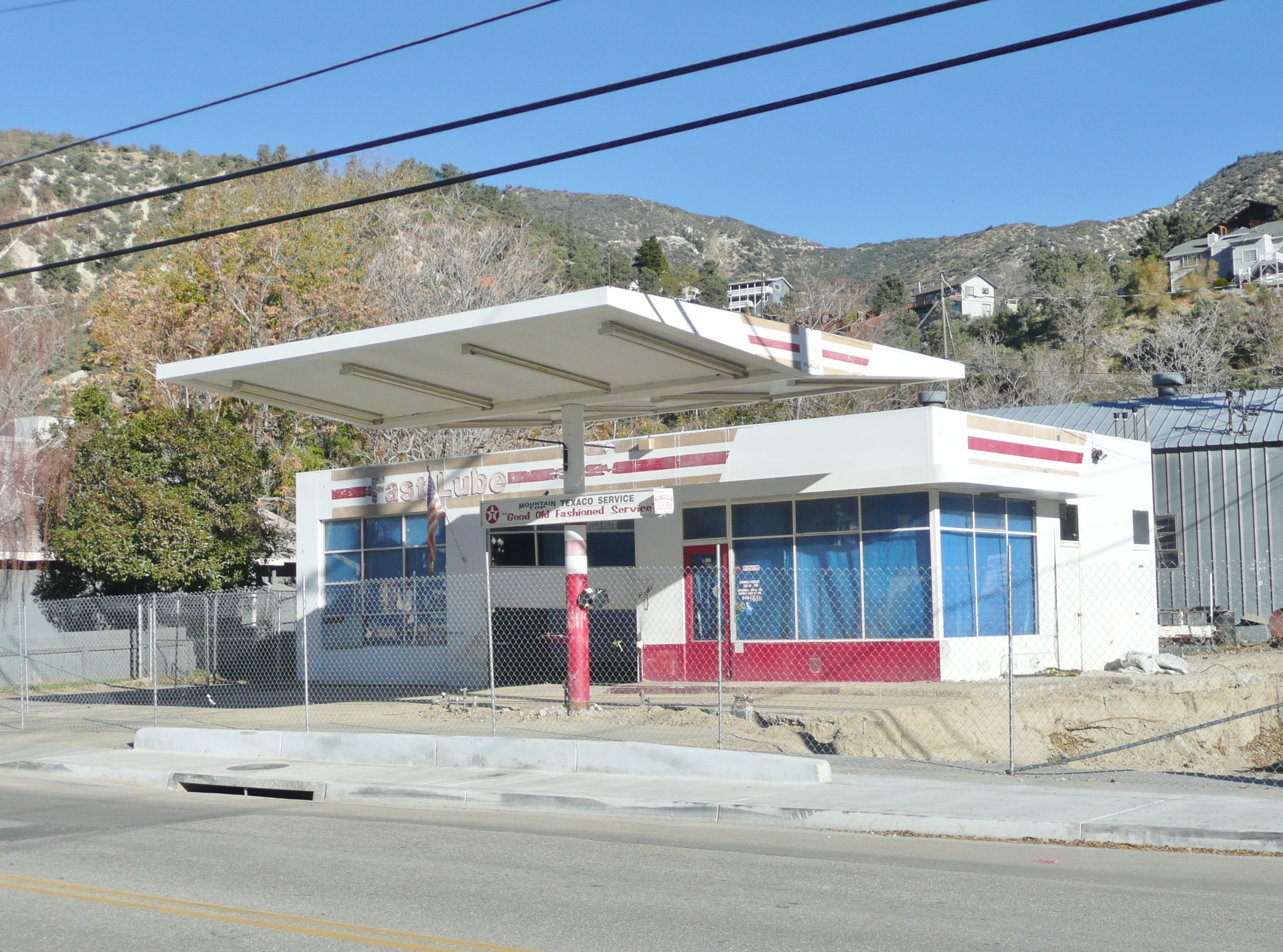
A non-operational Texaco gas station in Frazier Park, California, where the film's final fight scene was shot.

Several planned filming locations were abandoned due to budget constraints. For thematic reasons, the film's penultimate fight scene between JTRO and L Dubba E was originally set at Dawn's Liquor Mart—a key location in the film. The store's owners refused permission for filming and the location was changed to a long-abandoned gas station. Bryan Goddard, who portrays Sugga Nigga, acquired permission for the crew to film on the property.

The penultimate dance-off was filmed in three eight-minute long takes and edited down. Brandon Trost would "float around with the camera" while Valmassy and Jason Trost performed the dance-off sequence. While filming a tire training scene, Brandon asked Jason to increase the amount of spins he was performing. Jason broke his ankle and relied on his costume's snow boots as medical boots.

Director of photography Brandon Trost shot The FP using digital cinematography with Canon XH-A1 cameras, which he had recently used while filming Crank: High Voltage. Using a single-camera setup, he filmed The FP using 35mm film to evoke the traditional look of films such as The Warriors and Total Recall. Trost ignored camera and lighting errors to make the film "feel genuine".

=== Visual effects ===
Visual effects artist Aaron Juntunen copied the visuals from the Beat-Beat Revelation dance tracks from Dance Dance Revolution by using computer graphics. The tracks were played live, allowing the actors to dance in unison. Visual effects were also used to cover the name of Dawn's Liquor Mart, as the actual location did not give the production permission to use its name and logo.

=== Music ===
George Holdcroft composed the score for The FP. He was invited to a screening of the film by producer Christian Agypt, and asked if he could compose the music for it. Holdcroft, who lived in Chicago at the time, spent 12 hours a day composing the score and e-mailed his compositions to the Trost brothers. To emulate the sound of a choir for one song, Holdcroft sang the same segment more than 200 times using different voices and melodies to achieve the desired result. For another song, he sang in falsetto and altered the pitch of his voice to make himself sound like a woman.

Holdcroft had never played Dance Dance Revolution, though he was familiar with video game music—specifically the compositions of Koji Kondo, the score of Final Fantasy, and the music of early Nintendo games. The film's soundtrack consists of 61 songs.

== Release ==
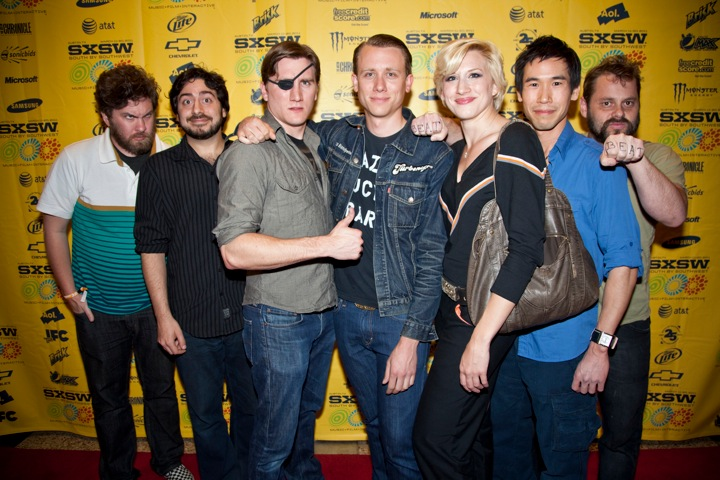
From left: First assistant director Christopher Holmes, producer Christian Agypt, director Jason Trost, director Brandon Trost, costume designer Sarah Trost, actor Art Hsu, and production designer Tyler B. Robinson at the film's South by Southwest premiere

The FP premiered on March 13, 2011, at South by Southwest. It was later screened at several events, including the Fantasia Festival, the Lund International Fantastic Film Festival, the Philadelphia Film Festival, and Cinefamily. The Trosts held a free screening of The FP in Frazier Park, California as part of the Alamo Drafthouse Cinema's Rolling Roadshow. The film began its limited theatrical run in the United States on March 16, 2012.

=== Box office ===
Drafthouse Films acquired distribution rights to The FP on August 1, 2011, one day after its premiere at the Fantasia Festival. Tim League, the founder of Drafthouse Films, attended the film's screening at South by Southwest and "fell in love with it". It was the second film distributed by Drafthouse Films, following Four Lions. The FP grossed $22,571 in 28 North American theaters during its opening week, averaging $806 per theater. The following week, it was shown in nine theaters and grossed $9,314. In the remaining five weeks of its run, the film grossed $7,979, for a total gross of $40,557.

=== Critical response ===
The film was met with positive reviews at its festival screenings. Jordan Hoffman, writing for UGO Networks, gave it a B+, compared it to Black Dynamite, and wrote that it "is bursting with idiotic humor and in-your-face stoner wit". Eric Kohn of Indiewire also gave the film a B+, called it "loud, furious and recklessly funny", and mentioned the references to The Warriors, RoboCop, and Escape from New York. Scott Weinberg of Twitch Film echoed Hoffman's comparison to Black Dynamite. Weinberg said he "found quite a lot to enjoy" and praised the performances of Hsu, Valmassy, and Trost. Jacob Hall of Moviefone gave the film a positive review, praising Brandon Trost's cinematography and mentioned its similarities to Mad Max 2 and A Clockwork Orange. He commended the film's dedication to its "absolutely ludicrous premise" and called it "the rare 'ready-made cult hit' that actually works". Fred Topel of Screen Junkies predicted that the film "will be the Trosts' calling card" and praised it for being "exactly the kind of the movie [Topel] hope[s] to see at Fantastic Fest, or any film festival".

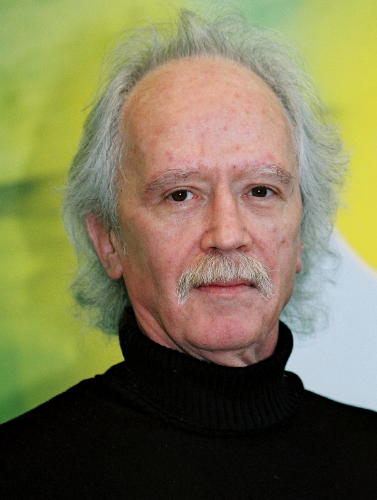
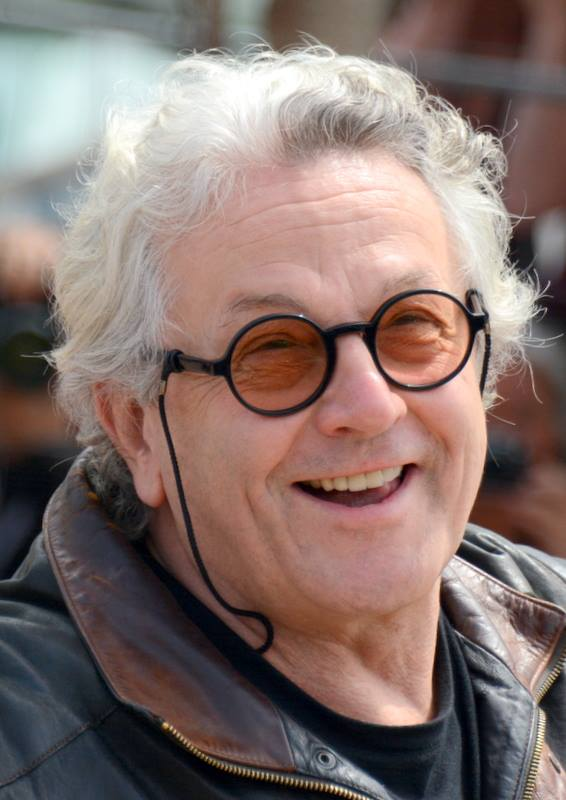
Several critics noted the influence of other films and their filmmakers, with some singling out the works of John Carpenter (left) and George Miller (right). Costume designer Sarah Trost has credited both as inspirations for her work.

Upon its theatrical release, The FP received mixed reviews from critics. The review aggregator website Rotten Tomatoes reported a 48% approval rating, with an average rating of 5.2/10 based on 23 reviews. On Metacritic, which assigns a normalized rating out of 100 based on reviews from critics, the film has a score of 48 based on 11 reviews, which is considered to be "mixed or average reviews".

Mick LaSalle of the San Francisco Chronicle gave the film a positive review, calling it "deadpan hilarious, a shameless satire of every teen gang, future-shock dystopian nightmare movie—combined with a brutal send-up of 8 Mile". Tom Keogh of The Seattle Times gave the film 2½ stars out of 4; he praised its novelty and criticized its lack of "outright laughs". Marc Savlov of The Austin Chronicle gave the film 3 stars out of 5, saying it was "awash in silliness" and calling it a "potential cult-movie masterpiece". Angela Watercutter of Wired called it an "instant cult classic" and also compared it to 8 Mile, Rocky and The Karate Kid. Shawn Anthony Levy, writing for The Oregonian, gave the film a B; he praised its eccentricity and said, "It's very hard not to admire its zealous commitment to its ethos". In a mixed review, Peter Debruge of Variety praised Brandon Trost's cinematography but said the film "plays its boilerplate premise with endearing earnestness, but runs thin in no time". Matt Hawkins of Kotaku called it a "legit goofball comedy" and said it "speaks to gamers without flat-out insulting them". Michael Phillips, writing for the Chicago Tribune, gave the film 2 stars out of 4, praising its premise and filming technique while criticizing its "sometimes funny execution".

"We didn't make this with the idea that it was going to be a cult, midnight movie. We really wanted it to just be something that we think is funny. We always felt like it was a big inside joke, and we're starting to realize that people are catching on to it."

— Brandon Trost

Conversely, Andy Webster of The New York Times said, "Its bargain-basement production values and lack of wit unexpectedly prove a greater liability than an asset". Robert Abele of the Los Angeles Times criticized its characters, costumes, and dialogue; he said it "so desperately wants to be cultishly admired ... that it forgets to be genuinely offbeat or funny". Scott Tobias of The A.V. Club gave the film a C+, mentioning the influences of John Carpenter, The Warriors, Mad Max 2, and A Clockwork Orange, and criticizing Jason Trost's performance. He said the film was "a junky, disposable lark, created for a midnight audience to swallow, belch, and forget about the next morning". Nick Schager of Slant Magazine gave it 1½ stars out of 4, and called it a "humorless void" and a "wannabe cult hit". Eric Hynes of The Village Voice said, "the film's charm fades fast" and, "[t]he problem with paying such dogged homage to shitty movies is that integrity is best achieved by producing a shitty movie in turn. Mission accomplished, for whatever that's worth." Ethan Gilsdorf of The Boston Globe gave the film 1 star out of 4, saying it was not "obliviously dreadful enough to be 'so bad it's good'". Christy Lemire of the Associated Press echoed this opinion, giving it 1 star out of 4; she said the film is "just plain bad—and boring, and repetitive" and that "as comedy, it just feels numbing". Max Nicholson of IGN said the film "is by no means the worst thing I've ever seen", but that it "should have been a three-minute sketch on Funny or Die".

=== Home media ===
Image Entertainment released The FP on DVD, Blu-ray Disc, video on demand, and digital download on June 19, 2012. The feature was accompanied by a making-of featurette, interviews with costume designer Sarah Trost and composer George Holdcroft, audio commentary by the Trost brothers, and a special edition collectors' booklet with introductions by Rob Zombie, Brian Taylor, and Mark Neveldine. Four special editions were made available for purchase on Drafthouse Films' website, all of which contain Holdcroft's soundtrack and a 720p HD digital download. Additional items sold include a Blu-ray or DVD copy of the film, a poster signed by the Trost brothers, a model of L Dubba E's grill, and a tampon in a glass tube signed by the Trost brothers.

== Sequels ==
According to Jason Trost, two sequels to The FP have been planned, the first of which would involve going to Hong Kong. He said the first sequel would take place five years after the original and would feature more dancing and a Beat-Beat Revelation tournament. He also compared the sequel's plot to that of Escape from L.A. Trost also teased the possibility of a fourth film to come when he was older, comparing it to Rocky Balboa. In August 2013, Trost said that both he and the film's investors had not received any money from The FP, and "probably never will". He further stated that it was challenging "to figure out a way to get people to fund a sequel to a movie that recouped zero dollars".

Trost started an Indiegogo fundraising campaign seeking $100,000 in February 2016, revealing the title to be Beats of Rage: The FP Part II. In July 2017, Trost started another Indiegogo campaign to finish the film, now titled Beats of Rage: The FP 2. The first thirty minutes of the film had already been shot at the time of the posting, and the fundraising goal was set at $20,000, which was surpassed with over $34,000 donated. In April 2018, a synopsis and poster were released for the film, now simply titled Beats of Rage. The film follows the events of The FP, and features Trost, Hsu, Barrera, and Principe reprising their roles from the first film, alongside new cast members Mike O'Gorman, Tallay Wickham, and Bru Miller. Beats of Rage will again feature JTRO and KCDC trying to save the world from an alcohol withdrawal by competing in the titular Beat-Beat Revelation tournament against AK-47, the leader of The Wastes. Trost also said that the film will debut at "a major U.S. genre festival" in October 2018. The film premiered at Fantastic Fest on September 22, 2018, again retitled FP2: Beats of Rage.

FP3: Escape From BAKO and FP4: EVZ world premiered in October 2021 and 2022 at the Nightmares Film Festival.
