= Silver Case =

- Poster for Silver Case
- Directed by: Christian Filippella
- Written by: Christian Filippella; Jason A. White
- Produced by: Christian Filippella; Claire Falconer
- Starring: Eric Roberts; Seymour Cassel; Shalim Ortiz; Vincent De Paul
- Cinematography: Christian Filippella
- Edited by: Christian Filippella
- Music by: Roberto Boarini; Cody Westheimer
- Release date: October 29, 2011 (International Rome Film Festival)
- Running time: 86 minutes
- Countries: Italy; United States
- Language: English

Silver Case is a multi-awarded independent feature film, produced and directed by Christian Filippella, starring Oscar Nominees actors Eric Roberts and Seymour Cassel, Brian Keith Gamble, Chris Facey, Vincent De Paul, Shalim Ortiz, Claire Falconer, Kelvin Han Yee, Brad Light, Art Hsu, Stanely B. Herman, and Fernanda Romero.

Silver Case premiered at the Rome Film Festival and has received many awards worldwide. The film also won 5 Indie Awards at the Indie Fest, best feature and best director at the LA Film & TV Festival and the Spirit of Independent Award at the 26th Fort Lauderdale International Film Festival.

The film was shot at various locations in California and Italy.

== Film Festivals Official Selection ==
- New Filmmakers Program NY (2012)
- Laughlin International Film Festival (2012)
- Salento International Film Festival (2012)
- Los Angeles Film & TV Film Festival (2012)
- Long Island International Film Festival (2012)
- Fantafilmfestival (2012)
- Hoboken International Film Festival (2012)
- Big Island International Film Festival (2012)
- San Diego Black Film Festival (2012)
- St. Augustine Film Festival (2012)
- Vegas Cine Fest (2012)
- Daytona Beach Film Festival (2011)
- Rome International Film Festival (2011)
- Cannes Film Festival (2011)
- Fort Lauderdale International Film Festival (2011)
- Bahamas International Film Festival (2011)
- Daytona Beach Film Festival (2011)

== Awards ==
- Best Feature Film - Los Angeles Film & TV Awards (2012)
- Best Actor -Vincent De Paul (actor)- Los Angeles Film & TV Awards(2012)
- Best Director - Los Angeles Film & TV Awards (2012)
- Frank Currier's Actor Award - Jury Prize Eric Roberts - Los Island Film Festival (2012)
- First Runner Up - Vegas Cine Fest (2012)
- Indie Fest Award - Award of Excellence - Lead Actor Eric Roberts (2012)
- Indie Fest Award - Award of Excellence - Lead Actor Brian Keith Gamble (2012)
- Indie Fest Award - Award of Merit/Excellence - Supporting Actress Claire Falconer (2012)
- Indie Fest Award - Award of Merit/Excellence - Direction Christian Filippella (2012)
- Accolade Award - Lead Actor Brian Keith Gamble (2012)
- Accolade Award - Direction Christian Filippella (2012)
- Global Music Award - Original Song Sweetly Dream by Brian Keith Gamble (2012)
- Global Music Award - Songwriter Brian Keith Gamble (2012)
- Spirit of Independent Award FLIFF 2011 (2011)
- Merit Award Bahamas on Location 2011 (2011)

== Cast ==
- Eric Roberts as Senator
- Shalim Ortiz as Tuco
- Brian Keith Gamble as Barabba
- Chris Facey as Caesar
- Seymour Cassel as Art Dealer
- Vincent De Paul (actor) as Doug Damian
- Claire Falconer as Margot
- Brad Light as Master
- Kelvin Han Yee as Business Man 1
- Art Hsu as Business Man 2
- Andrea Boccaletti as Locksmith
- Stanley B. Herman as Money Man
- Fernanda Romero as Lola
- Yuri Lowenthal as Donnie
