= Brandon Trost =

American cinematographer, screenwriter, director, producer, and actor

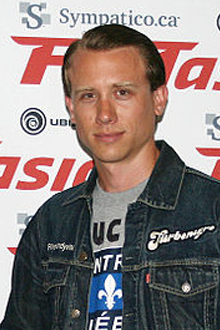
- Trost at the premiere of The FP, 2011 Fantasia Festival
- Born: Brandon Scott Trost; August 29, 1981 (age 45); Los Angeles, California, US
- Education: Los Angeles Film School
- Occupations: Cinematographer and director
- Years active: 1996–present
- Relatives: Jason Trost (brother)

Brandon Scott Trost (born August 29, 1981) is an American cinematographer and director.

== Early life and education ==
Trost was born in 1981 in Los Angeles, California, to Karen (née French) and Ron Trost, a special effects coordinator.

His grandfather, Scott Maitland, was an assistant director, and his great-grandfather was a stuntman. His uncle was actor Victor French.

He grew up in Frazier Park, California, with his brother Jason and sister Sarah.

Trost attended at the Frazier Mountain High School and later graduated from the Los Angeles Film School.

He has cited Andrew Laszlo as one of his favorite cinematographers, calling Streets of Fire "one of the most amazing-looking movies from the 1980s."

== Career ==
Trost is a cinematographer, screenwriter, and film director, whose credits include writing and directing The FP with his brother Jason.

Brandon started as cinematographer of a number of independent/low-budget projects like Crank: High Voltage, Halloween II and MacGruber, before becoming a frequent collaborator of Seth Rogen, working in films like This Is the End, Neighbors, The Interview and The Night Before, while making a solo debut as director with An American Pickle.

Trost has since become an active cinematographer of big-budget productions like the Sonic the Hedgehog sequels and Coyote vs. Acme.

== Filmography ==
=== Cinematographer ===
==== Film ====
Key
†	Denotes films that have not yet been released

Year	Title	Director	Notes
2001	Deuces	Michael Winnick	
2004	Lightning Bug	Robert Green Hall	
2005	The Salon	Mark Brown	
2005	Val/Val	Gustavo Camelot	With Tobias Datum
2005	Chaos	David DeFalco	
2006	Outside Sales	Blayne Weaver	
2006	Special Ops: Delta Force	Cole S. McKay	
2007	He Was a Quiet Man	Frank Cappello	
2007	Broken Glass	Gustavo Camelot	With Tobias Datum and Alejandro Lalinde
2007	One of Our Own	Abe Levy	
2007	Days of Darkness	Jake Kennedy	
2007	The Last Season	Bryan Kramer	
2008	Presence	Brian Kramer	
2009	Weather Girl	Blayne Weaver	
2009	Crank: High Voltage	Mark Neveldine; Brian Taylor	
2009	Halloween II	Rob Zombie	
2010	MacGruber	Jorma Taccone	
2010	Mad World	Cory Cataldo	
2010	A Buddy Story	Marc Erlbaum	
2011	The FP	Himself; Jason Trost	
2011	Ghost Rider: Spirit of Vengeance	Mark Neveldine; Brian Taylor	
2012	That's My Boy	Sean Anders	
2012	The Lords of Salem	Rob Zombie	
2013	This Is the End	Seth Rogen; Evan Goldberg	
2014	That Awkward Moment	Tom Gormican	
2014	Neighbors	Nicholas Stoller	
2014	The Interview	Seth Rogen; Evan Goldberg	
2015	The Diary of a Teenage Girl	Marielle Heller	
2015	Scouts Guide to the Zombie Apocalypse	Christopher B. Landon	
2015	The Night Before	Jonathan Levine	
2016	Neighbors 2: Sorority Rising	Nicholas Stoller	
2016	Popstar: Never Stop Never Stopping	Akiva Schaffer; Jorma Taccone	
2017	The Disaster Artist	James Franco	
2018	Can You Ever Forgive Me?	Marielle Heller	
2019	Extremely Wicked, Shockingly Evil and Vile	Joe Berlinger	
2021	Dear Evan Hansen	Stephen Chbosky	
2022	Sonic the Hedgehog 2	Jeff Fowler	
2022	Bros	Nicholas Stoller	
2024	Nightbitch	Marielle Heller	
2024	Sonic the Hedgehog 3	Jeff Fowler	
2025	The Naked Gun	Akiva Schaffer	
2026	Little Brother	Matt Spicer	
2026	Coyote vs. Acme	Dave Green	
2027	Sonic the Hedgehog 4 †	Jeff Fowler	Post-production

Direct-to-video

Year	Title	Director
2004	State's Evidence	Benjamin Louis
2008	Pulse 2: Afterlife	Joel Soisson
2008	Pulse 3	Joel Soisson

Short film

Year	Title	Director
2001	King of the Road	Christopher Holmes
2001	Indecent Proposal	Scott Quigley
2001	In Too Deep	Scott Quigley
2002	Last Word	Karinna Bakker
2002	All Good Things	Levi Holiman
2002	Trust	Andre Campbell
2003	Dark as Day	Levi Holiman
2003	Shit Happens	Dan Fogelman
2003	The Attachment	Alex Nicoll
2003	Frame of Mind	Simon Joecker
2003	William Wilson	Nicholas Davis
2004	Fish Out of Water	Dewey Kim
2004	In the Garden	Craig Dittrich
2004	Messiah	Tiago Mesquita
2005	Secret Santa Deluxe	Marc Milstein
2005	We All Fall Down	Jake Kennedy
2005	Blockbusters	Trever James; Luke Rold
2005	Manejar	Shelly Gant
2006	That Guy	Dash Mihok
2006	Time Capsule	Levi Holiman
2006	Solus	Richard Heller
2007	Teri	Trever James
2007	The FP	Himself; Jason Trost
2007	The Day the Dead Weren't Dead	Himself; Jason Trost
2008	Person, Place or Thing	Elle Martini
2010	Anti-Samaritan Hotline	A. Tad Chamberlain
2012	The Ballad of Danko Jones	Jason Diamond; Josh Diamond
2018	Endgame	Matthew Castellanos

==== Television ====
Year	Title	Director(s)	Episode(s)
2012	Dark Wall	Toby Wilkins	"6:14"
2017	Future Man	Seth Rogen; Evan Goldberg	"Pilot"
2018	Barry	Bill Hader	"Chapter One: Make Your Mark"
2019	The Righteous Gemstones	Danny McBride	"The Righteous Gemstones"
2024	Knuckles	Jeff Fowler	"The Warrior"
2024	Knuckles	Ged Wright	"Don't Ever Say I Wasn't There for You"
2024	Knuckles	Jorma Taccone	"The Flames of Disaster"

Music video

Year	Title	Artist
2003	Master of None	Fireball Ministry
2004	(Welcome to The) Sun Tangled Angel Revival	Kevn Kinney
2004	Shine	Josh Todd
2005	Sundown	Fireball Ministry
2005	New York Girls	Celebutante
2006	Lillian, Egypt	Josh Ritter
2006	I Won't Remember Your Name	The Letter Openers
2006	Girl in the War	Josh Ritter
2006	In the Satellite Rides a Star	Old 97's
2006	Weathered Soul	Manntis
2007	Destroyer	Static-X
2007	Love Me Like the World Is Ending	Ben Lee
2007	Little Bo Peep	Phillip Roebuck
2007	Beautiful Tragedy	In This Moment
2008	Little Dog	Million Dollar Mouth
2009	Super Villain	Powerman 5000
2009	Whatever It Is	Zac Brown
2009	Thinking About You	The Soul of John Black
2010	Full of Regret	Danko Jones
2010	Had Enough	Danko Jones
2010	Sick Bubblegum	Rob Zombie
2010	Mars Needs Women	Rob Zombie
2010	Butcher, Faker, Policy Maker	Fireball Ministry
2011	Detroit City	Drivin N Cryin
2012	American Daydream	Electric Guest
2013	Dead City Radio and the New Gods of Supertown	Rob Zombie
2013	Go Kindergarten	The Lonely Island (featuring Robyn)
2016	Saw It Coming	G-Eazy (featuring Jeremih)
2017	Run	Foo Fighters
2017	The Sky Is a Neighborhood	Foo Fighters
2017	The Answer	Fireball Minister

=== Director ===
Short film

- The FP (2007)
- The Day the Dead Weren't Dead (Also producer) (2007)

Feature film

- The FP (Note: Co-written and co-directed with Jason Trost; credited as "Trost Bros.") (2011)
- An American Pickle (2020)

Television

Year	Title	Episode
2017	Future Man	"Pandora's Mailbox"
2024	Knuckles	"The Shabbat Dinner"

Music video

Year	Title	Artist
2005	Sundown	Fireball Ministry
2007	Little Bo Peep	Phillip Roebuck
2010	Butcher, Faker, Policy Maker	Fireball Ministry
2017	The Answer	Fireball Ministry

=== Acting roles ===
Year	Title	Role	Notes
1996	Kazaam	Student	Uncredited
1998	Rushmore	Vietnamese soldier with rocket launcher	Uncredited
2004	Lightning Bug	Seismograph drummer	Uncredited
2009	Crank: High Voltage	White Slave Boy	Uncredited
2010	MacGruber	Brick's boyfriend	
2013	This Is the End	Cannibal	Uncredited
2019	Extremely Wicked, Shockingly Evil and Vile	Interview Cameraman	
2025	The Naked Gun	Mug Shot Photographer	Uncredited
