= Vincent De Paul (actor) =

American actor and model (born 1972)

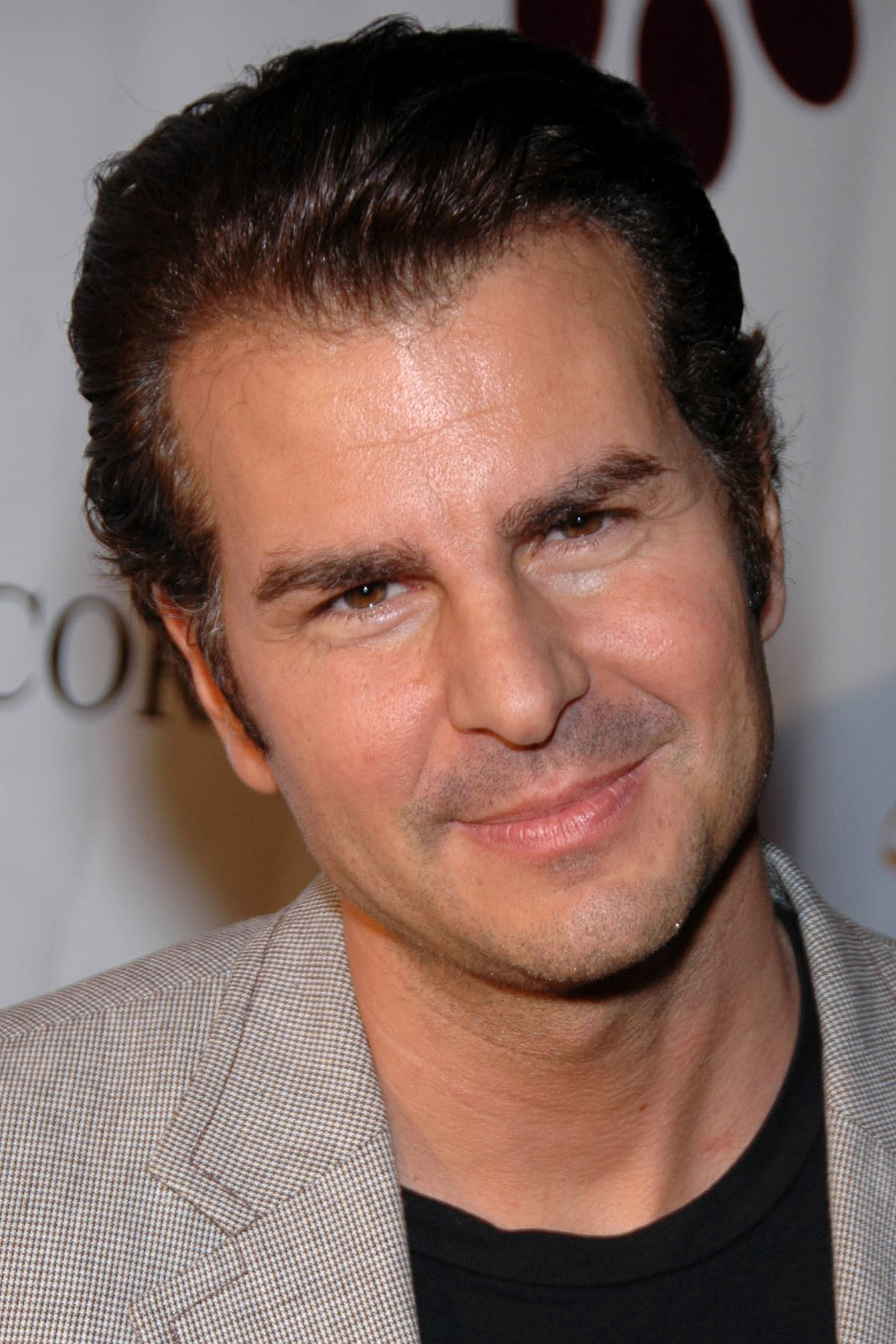
- De Paul attending the "Cuties for Canines" charity event in West Los Angeles, California on November 16, 2007
- Occupations: Actor, model

Vincent De Paul (born September 2, 1968) is an American actor and model.

== Biography ==
Vincent De Paul was born in Baltimore, Maryland.

He received a BLA in epidemiology and biomedical ethics from Johns Hopkins University.

De Paul appeared as Carmelita's dance partner in Hairspray, and has since appeared in several television shows, including The West Wing, Frasier, As the World Turns, Six Feet Under, Mad Men, and Big Time Rush. He also appeared in the movies Hitch (2005) and Poseidon (2006).

In 2011 he had the role of Doug Damian in the feature film Silver Case, for which he was also an associate producer. He went on to work on Beverly Hills Christmas 2, which started filming in December 2016, with producer Yuriy Zubarev.

De Paul received an Emmy award for producing The Bay. He is the president and co-founder of Five Arts Productions, and a member of the Producers Guild of America, the Screen Actors Guild, and the Academy of Television Arts & Sciences. He is also a supporter of the Special Olympics.
