= Diamond Bear Brewing Company =

Beer company

Diamond Bear Brewing Co.

- Location: North Little Rock, AR; United States
- Owned by: Employee-Owned Partnership

Active beers
Name	Type
Southern Blonde	All-malt lager
Ultra Light	Light lager
Pale Ale	English Pale Ale
Irish Red	Red Ale
Presidential IPA	India Pale Ale
Paradise Porter	Porter

Diamond Bear Brewing Company is a beer brewery located in North Little Rock, Arkansas. Diamond Bear derives its name from the fact Arkansas is the only state in the United States where diamonds are naturally found, and the fact Arkansas was once known as The Bear State.

The Diamond Bear Brewery is also a prime tourist attraction offering tours to beer lovers visiting Arkansas.

Diamond Bear started brewing on September 21, 2000, founded by Russ and Sue Melton. Up to that point, Arkansas did not have a commercial brewery within its borders.

In March 2009, Diamond Bear doubled its production capacity with help from the Arkansas Economic Development Commission.
