= Jason Trost =

American director, actor, producer, special effects artist, and screenwriter

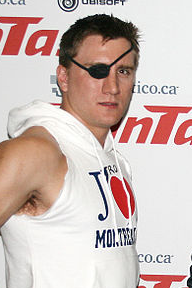
- Trost at the premiere of The FP, 2011 Fantasia Festival
- Born: Jason Wayne Trost; November 15, 1986 (age 39); Los Angeles, California, United States
- Occupations: Director, actor, producer, screenwriter, special effects artist
- Years active: 1996-present
- Relatives: Brandon Trost (brother)

Jason Wayne Trost (born November 15, 1986) is an American filmmaker and actor. Along with his brother Brandon, he wrote and directed the 2011 comedy The FP, which he also starred in. The same year, Trost wrote, directed, and starred in the superhero thriller All Superheroes Must Die.

== Career ==
Trost's first feature film as a director was The FP, which centers around a group of gangs that settle disputes by playing a video game called Beat-Beat Revelation (a very similar game to Dance Dance Revolution). Trost got the idea for The FP when he was 16 years old and lived in Frazier Park, California (which the film is named after). Trost and his high-school friends used to play Dance Dance Revolution and Def Jam Vendetta, and came up with a concept for a setting in which urban gang members battled over turf and pride through arcade dance games. Trost has claimed that the film's title was intentionally made to mock The OC. Trost starred in the film as the main protagonist, JTro.

Later in 2011, Trost released the film All Superheroes Must Die (also known as Vs), an action thriller about four superheroes who have been stripped of their powers by an evil supervillain. The heroes have to race against the clock while playing sadistic games in order save a small town from being destroyed. Trost described the film as a mixture of Saw and The Running Man. Trost starred in the film as the superhero Charge.

Trost released the film Wet and Reckless on August 8, 2013. The film is a satire of reality television about two morally corrupted reality show veterans who are joined by a new cast member. While they are in Thailand filming the newest season of their show, their production company cuts off contact and funding in an attempt to get them to break their contract and make way for a new cast. The cast members search Thailand for a treasure map that will lead them to a treasure to make them rich enough to get home. Trost played the role of "The Lobo", a narcissistic former US marine.

Trost reprised a cannibal version of his role as JTro in the 2013 film This is the End, although he had no lines in the film and was uncredited. Trost also played the role of Hamilton in the 2013 slasher film, Hatchet III.

Trost starred in a trilogy of music videos by the thrash metal band Slayer, in support of their album Repentless, the first one being the title track. The video depicts Slayer playing in a prison yard in front of rioting inmates and prison guards who are wearing riot gear and carrying shields. Most of the video is shot from the inside of the prison, where Trost (who plays the role of a convict) releases an entire prison cell block in order to get revenge on an apparent rival inmate. The video sports a large cast of veteran horror film actors, such as Danny Trejo, Derek Mears, Tyler Mane, Tony Moran, Vernon Wells, and Sean Whalen. The video was released on September 11, 2015. The other two videos out in this trilogy are "You Against You" and "Pride in Prejudice".

In 2022, the third sequel to The FP premiered at Nightmares Film Festival. Trost was given the festival's Esprit de Gore.

== Personal life ==
Trost is blind in his right eye, and has it covered in all of his movies and public appearances, often by wearing an eyepatch.
