= List of Dynasty characters =

List of Dynasty characters may refer to:

- List of Dynasty (1981 TV series) characters
- List of Dynasty (2017 TV series) characters
