= List of Dynasty (2017 TV series) characters =

American television soap opera characters

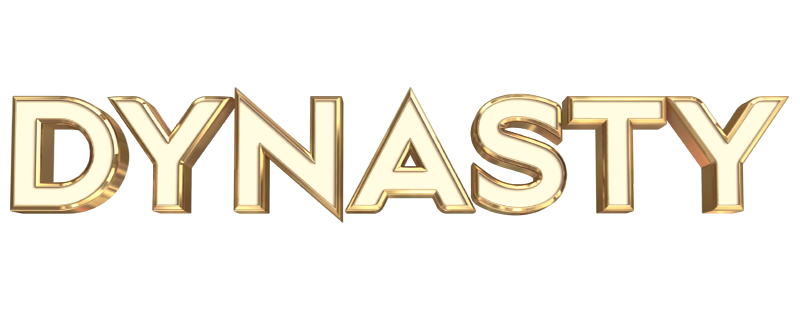
Dynasty's logo

Dynasty is a 2017–2022 American television series based on the 1980s prime time soap opera of the same name.

In season one, heiress Fallon Carrington (Elizabeth Gillies) is unhappy to find her billionaire father Blake (Grant Show) engaged to Cristal Flores (Nathalie Kelley), a rival employee at the family company. When Fallon's machinations to separate the couple backfire and cost her a promotion, she allies with Blake's nemesis, Jeff Colby (Sam Adegoke), and strikes out on her own. Meanwhile, the arrival of Cristal's opportunistic nephew Sam (Rafael de la Fuente)—who becomes romantically involved with Fallon's wayward brother Steven (James Mackay)—threatens to expose Cristal's shady past. Watching out for the Carringtons are majordomo Anders (Alan Dale) and chauffeur Michael Culhane (Robert Christopher Riley). Later in the season, Fallon marries Liam Ridley (Adam Huber) to thwart Jeff's plot to ruin her, and Blake's ex-wife Alexis Carrington (Nicollette Sheridan), the estranged mother of Steven and Fallon, returns. Season two introduces Ana Brenda Contreras as Cristal Jennings; Maddison Brown as Anders' daughter Kirby; Sam Underwood as Adam Carrington, Blake and Alexis' eldest son; and Michael Michele as Dominique Deveraux, Blake's half-sister and the mother of Jeff and Monica Colby (Wakeema Hollis). In season three, Daniella Alonso portrays Cristal, and Elaine Hendrix plays Alexis. Season four introduces Eliza Bennett as Alexis' secret daughter by Blake, Amanda.

The reboot updates several elements from the 1980s original, including moving the setting from Denver, Colorado to Atlanta, Georgia; making Steven's homosexuality a nonissue to Blake; and changing gold digger Sammy Jo from a woman to a gay man. Additionally, in the new series, Blake's new wife and her nephew are Hispanic, both Michael and the Colby family are African-American, and Amanda is a lesbian.

== Overview ==
Actor	Character	Appearances					
Actor	Character	First	1	2	3	4	5
Main characters
Elizabeth Gillies	Fallon Carrington	"I Hardly Recognized You"	Main	Main	Main	Main	Main
Nathalie Kelley	Celia Machado / Cristal Flores	"I Hardly Recognized You"	Main				
James Mackay	Steven Carrington	"I Hardly Recognized You"	Main (Note: In season two, James Mackay is credited as a series regular in the episodes in which he appears with the exception of "A Champagne Mood" (2.10) and "Deception, Jealousy, and Lies" (2.22), in which he is credited as a special guest star and a guest star, respectively.)	Main			Guest
Robert Christopher Riley	Michael Culhane	"I Hardly Recognized You"	Main	Main	Main	Main	Main
Sam Adegoke	Jeff Colby	"I Hardly Recognized You"	Main	Main	Main	Main	Main
Rafael de la Fuente	Samuel "Sammy Jo" Jones	"I Hardly Recognized You"	Main	Main	Main	Main	Main
Alan Dale	Joseph Anders	"I Hardly Recognized You"	Main	Main	Main	Main	
Grant Show	Blake Carrington	"I Hardly Recognized You"	Main	Main	Main	Main	Main
Nicollette Sheridan (Note: Credited as a series regular from "Twenty-Three Skidoo" to "Motherly Overprotectiveness" (2.15), in "Miserably Ungrateful Men" (2.16) she is played by a stand-in, and from "How Two-Faced Can You Get" (2.17) to "This Illness of Mine" (2.19) she is played by Elizabeth Gillies.)	Alexis Carrington Colby	"Poor Little Rich Girl"	Recurring (Note: Sheridan was credited as a special guest star.)	Main			
Elaine Hendrix	Alexis Carrington Colby	"The Sensational Blake Carrington Trial"			Main	Main	Main
Ana Brenda Contreras	Cristal Jennings Carrington (Note: Daniella Alonso also portrays Rita the fifth season in a recurring capacity. She is also given an end-credits billing for her role as Rita.)	"Twenty-Three Skidoo"		Main			
Daniella Alonso	Cristal Jennings Carrington	"Guilt Trip To Alaska"			Main	Main	Main
Maddison Brown	Kirby Anders	"Twenty-Three Skidoo"	Stand-in (Note: Kirby is portrayed by a stand-in in the season one finale episode, "Dead Scratch" (1.22).)	Main	Main	Main	Main
Sam Underwood	Adam Carrington	"Parisian Legend Has It..."		Main (Note: Sam Underwood is credited as a guest star in "Parisian Legend Has It..." (2.14), and as a series regular from "Motherly Overprotectiveness" (2.15) onward.)	Main	Main	Main
Michael Michele	Dominique Deveraux	"New Lady in Town"		Special Guest	Main	Main	Main
Adam Huber	Liam Ridley	"Our Turn Now"	Recurring	Recurring	Main	Main	Main
Eliza Bennett	Amanda Carrington	"The British Are Coming"				Recurring	Main
Recurring characters
Wakeema Hollis	Monica Colby	"I Hardly Recognized You"	Recurring	Recurring	Recurring	Guest	
Brianna Brown	Claudia Blaisdel	"I Hardly Recognized You"	Recurring	Recurring			Guest
Nick Wechsler	Matthew Blaisdel	"I Hardly Recognized You"	Recurring				
Elena Tovar	Iris Machado	"Guilt is for Insecure People"	Recurring				Guest
Michael Patrick Lane	Ted Dinard	"Company Slut"	Recurring				
Luis Fernández	Alejandro Raya	"The Best Things in Life"	Recurring				
Hakeem Kae-Kazim	Cesil Colby	"Rotten Things"	Recurring	Guest			
Brent Antonello	Hank Sullivan	"A Line from the Past"	Guest	Recurring			
Katherine LaNasa	Ada Stone	"The Butler Did It"		Recurring			
Nicole Zyana	Allison	"How Two-Faced Can You Get"		Recurring	Guest		
Sharon Lawrence	Laura Van Kirk	"The Butler Did It"		Guest	Recurring	Guest	Guest
Ken Kirby	Evan Tate	“Wild Ghost Chase”			Recurring	Guest	
Kelli Barrett	Nadia	"Mother? I'm at La Mirage"			Recurring		
Jade Payton	Vanessa Deveraux	"Mother? I'm at La Mirage"			Recurring		
Daniel Di Tomasso	Fletcher Myers	“Shoot from the Hip”			Recurring	Guest	
Emily Rudd	Heidi	"You See Most Things in Terms of Black & White"			Recurring		
John Jackson Hunter	Connor	"You See Most Things in Terms of Black & White"			Recurring		
Wil Traval	Caleb Collins	"Is the Next Surgery on the House?"			Guest	Recurring	
Lachlan Buchanan	Ryan	"My Hangover's Arrived"			Guest	Recurring	Guest
Ashley Day	Colin McNaughton	"Your Sick and Self-Serving Vendetta"				Recurring	
Luke Cook	Oliver Noble	"Equal Justice for the Rich"				Recurring	
David Aron Damane	Leo Abbott	"A Public Forum for Her Lies"				Recurring	
Kara Royster	Eva	"She Lives in a Showplace Penthouse"				Recurring	Guest
Geovanni Gopradi	Roberto "Beto" Flores	"Motherly Overprotectiveness"		Guest	Guest	Guest	Recurring
Felisha Terrell	Nina Fournier	"How Did the Board Meeting Go?"					Recurring
Pej Vahdat	Dex Dexter	"How Did the Board Meeting Go?"					Recurring
Rogelio T. Ramos	Daniel Ruiz	"Go Catch Your Horse"					Recurring
Cynthia Quiles	Charlie Jiménez	"Devoting All of Her Energy to Hate"					Recurring
Brett Tucker	Ben Carrington	"Vicious Vendetta"					Recurring
Samantha Massell	Stacey Moore	"Vicious Vendetta"					Recurring
Grace Junot	Ellen	"Stars Make You Smile"				Guest	Recurring

== Main ==
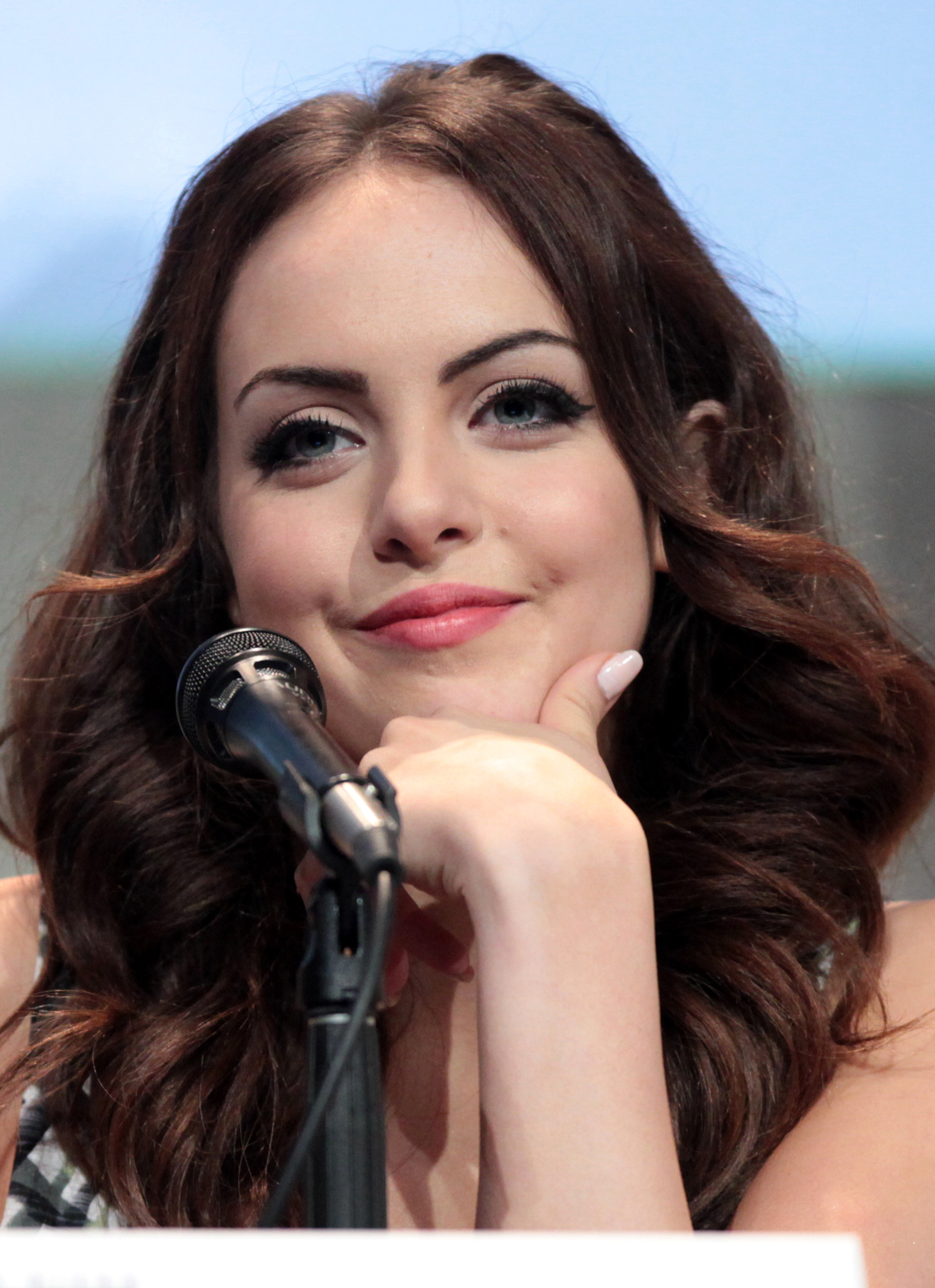
Elizabeth Gillies portrays Fallon Carrington, and Alexis Carrington in the second half of season two

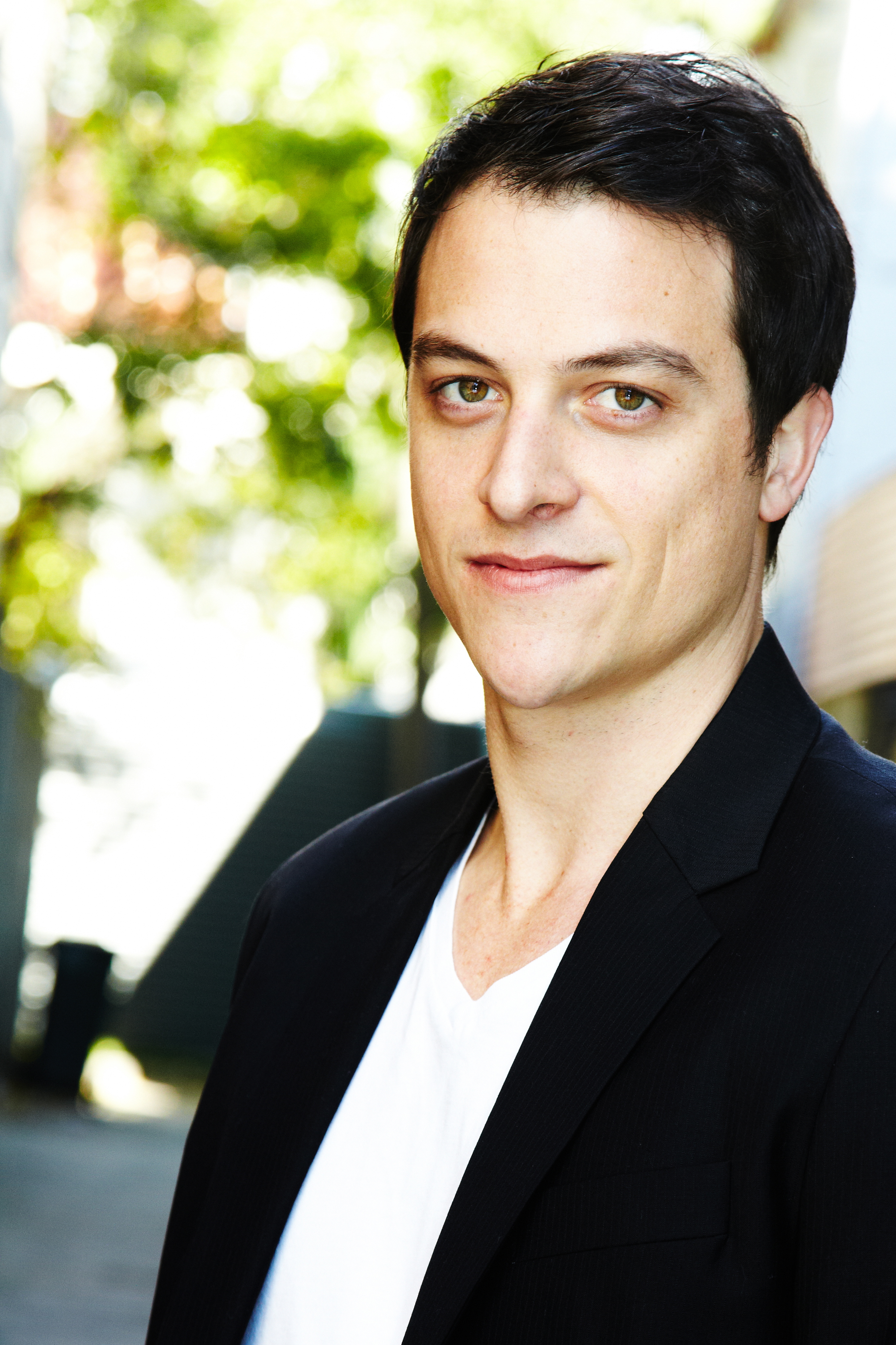
James Mackay plays Steven Carrington

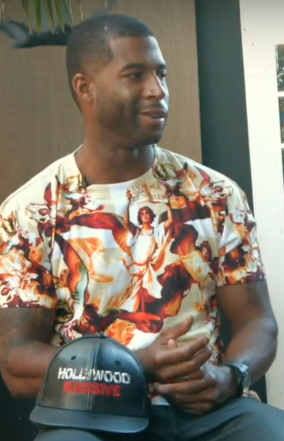
Robert Christopher Riley portrays Michael Culhane

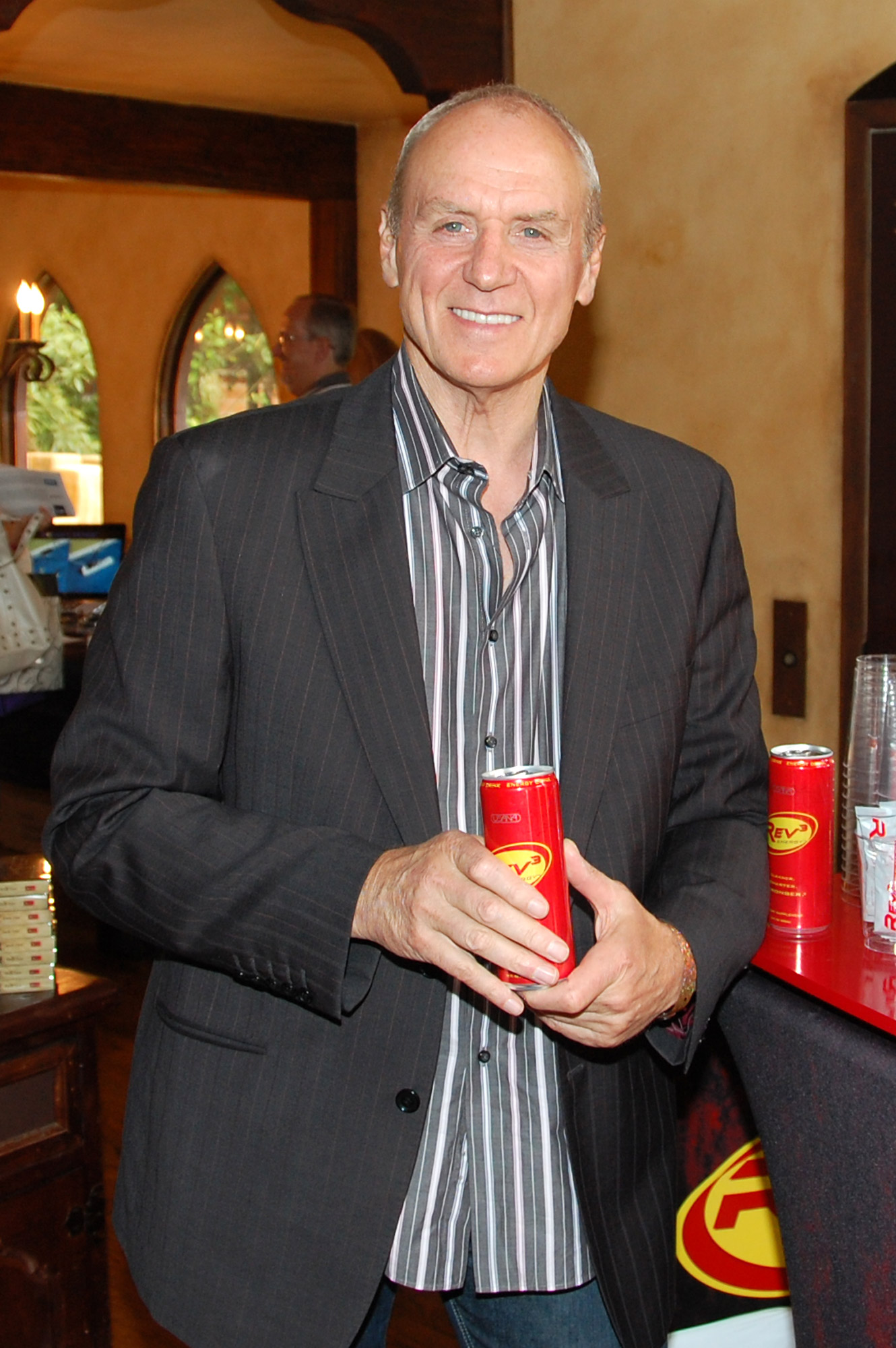
Alan Dale portrays Joseph Anders

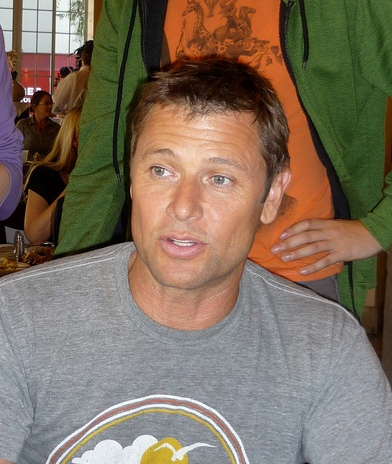
Grant Show plays Blake Carrington

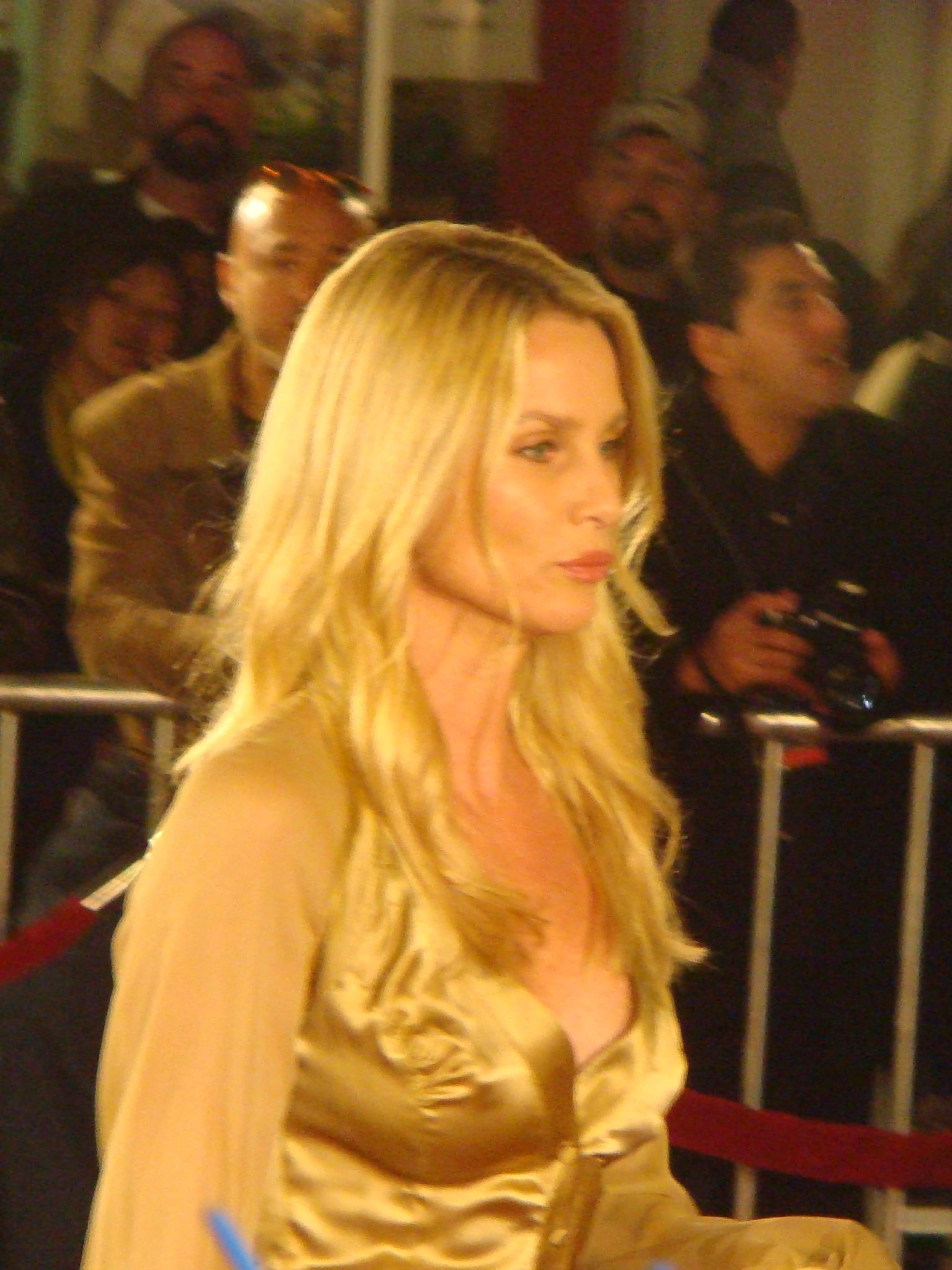
Nicollette Sheridan portrays Alexis Carrington in seasons one and two

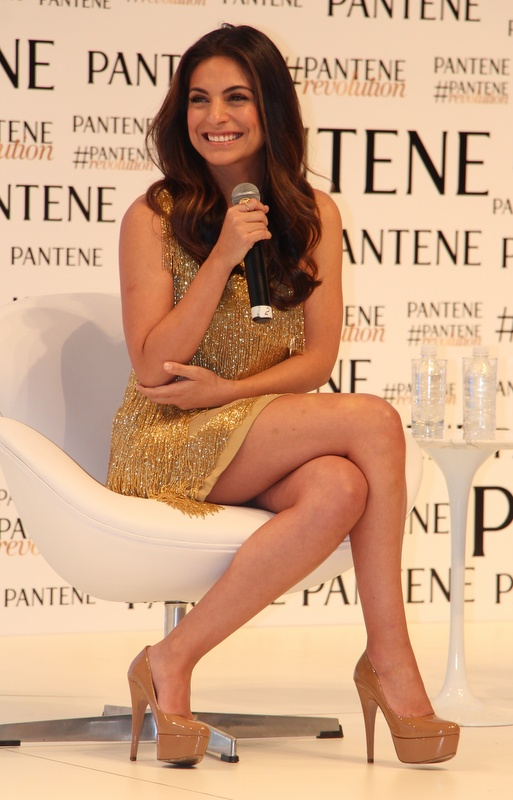
Ana Brenda Contreras plays Cristal Jennings in season two

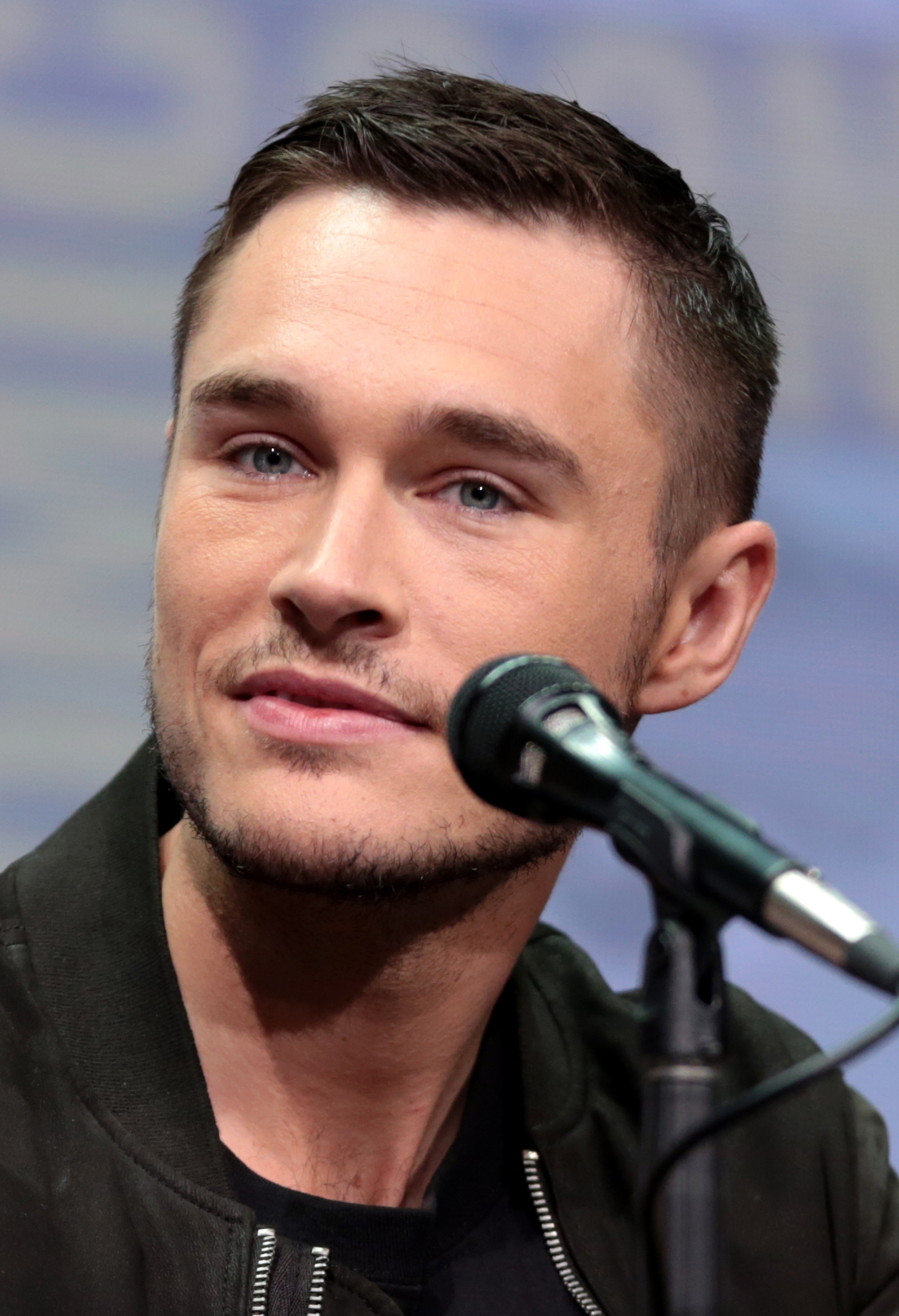
Sam Underwood portrays Adam Carrington

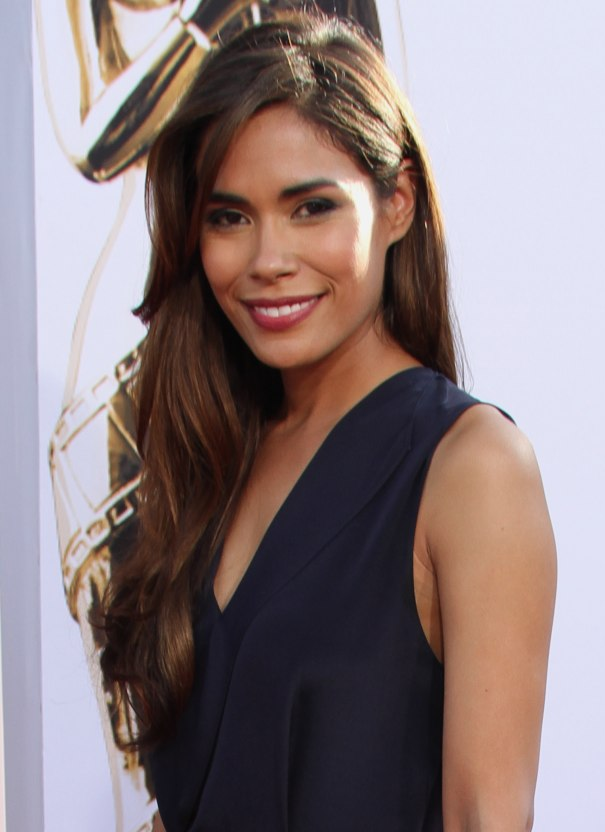
Daniella Alonso plays Cristal in the third season

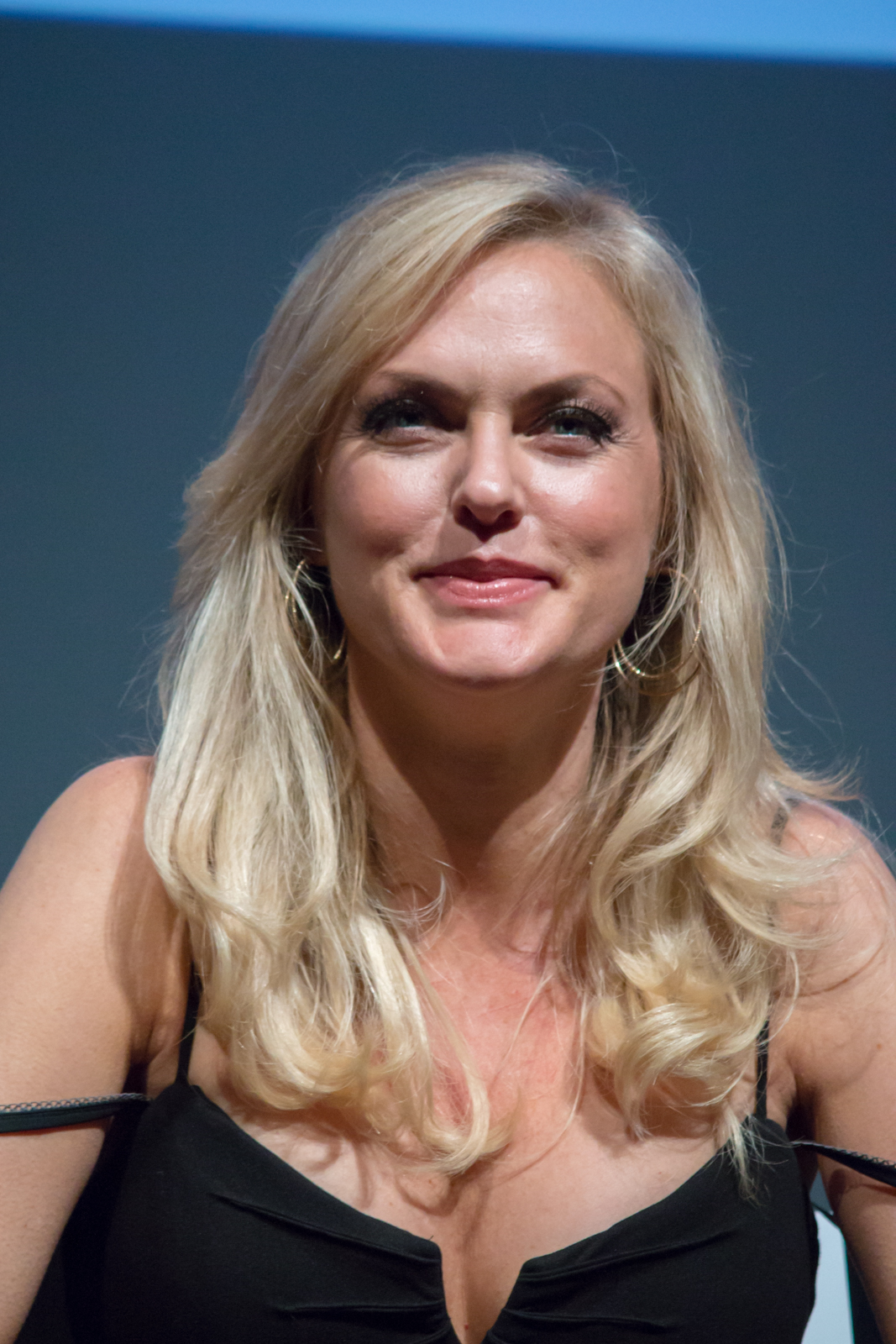
Elaine Hendrix portrays Alexis Carrington in season three

=== Fallon Carrington ===
Heiress Fallon Carrington (Elizabeth Gillies) is unhappy with her father Blake's engagement to Cristal Flores, and is furious when he gives Cristal the promotion Fallon wanted for herself. She positions herself as her father's business rival, backed by Blake's nemesis Jeff Colby. Oblivious to Jeff's attraction to her, Fallon is carrying on a sexual relationship with the family chauffeur, Michael Culhane.

=== Cristal Flores Carrington ===
Carrington Atlantic's head of public relations, Cristal Flores (Nathalie Kelley), marries Blake and immediately makes an enemy of his daughter Fallon. Cristal's married ex-lover, Matthew Blaisdel, is killed in the aftermath of a suspicious explosion, which implicates the Carringtons. Cristal—whose real name is Celia Machado—is also trying to hide certain details of her past from Blake, which is made more difficult by the arrival of her nephew Sam Jones.

=== Steven Carrington ===
Blake's son Steven Carrington (James Mackay) devotes himself to environmental and humanitarian causes, often in opposition to his father's business interests. He becomes romantically involved with Sam, who he soon discovers is his new stepmother Cristal's nephew.

=== Michael Culhane ===
Blake's chauffeur Michael Culhane (Robert Christopher Riley) is Fallon's lover and unofficial henchman; he has feelings for her which at first seem unrequited, but in losing him Fallon realizes that she loves him.

=== Jeff Colby ===
Jeff Colby (Sam Adegoke) is a high school friend of Fallon's, and Blake's former employee. He made a fortune from software he created while working for Blake, which the court ruled was his own property. Blake has never forgiven him for this "betrayal". Jeff finances Fallon's business venture to be close to her, but it takes a while for her to begin to see his value as a partner. In "Trashy Little Tramp", it is revealed that Jeff's mother Millie is Blake Carrington's half-sister.

=== Sam "Sammy Jo" Jones ===
Cristal's opportunistic nephew Samuel Josiah "Sammy Jo" Jones (Rafael de la Fuente) becomes romantically involved with Steven. Sam's presence makes Cristal nervous, as he knows her secrets.

=== Joseph Anders ===
Staunchly protective of the Carringtons, majordomo Joseph Anders (Alan Dale) is threatened by Cristal's presence as the new would-be mistress of the mansion, as well as her scheming nephew Sam.

=== Blake Carrington ===
Atlanta energy tycoon Blake Carrington (Grant Show as an adult, Jax Buresh as a teenager) marries public relations executive Cristal Flores, which lands his family at the center of a scandal when Cristal's married ex-lover Matthew Blaisdel is killed in a suspicious explosion. The marriage—and Blake's promotion of Cristal to COO of his company, Carrington Atlantic—put him at odds with his daughter Fallon, who allies herself with Blake's nemesis Jeff Colby as a business rival to her father. Blake already has a complicated relationship with his son Steven, who disapproves of his father's capitalistic politics and underhanded business tactics.

=== Alexis Carrington Colby ===
Blake's long absent ex-wife Alexis (Nicollette Sheridan) reappears at Thomas' funeral in "Poor Little Rich Girl", and she soon makes an enemy of her daughter Fallon in "Enter Alexis". The role was later portrayed by Elizabeth Gillies in three episodes of season two, and played by Elaine Hendrix in seasons three, four and five .

=== Cristal Jennings Carrington ===
Cristal Jennings (Ana Brenda Contreras), the woman from whom Celia Machado got her identity as Cristal, comes to Atlanta to offer her condolences to Blake in season two. The role is played by Daniella Alonso in seasons three, four and five.

=== Kirby Anders ===
Anders's estranged daughter arrives at the Carrington manor by Sam's invitation in "Dead Scratch". Anders keeps Kirby (Maddison Brown) at a distance from the Carringtons in "Twenty-Three Skidoo", and father and daughter clash over her wild lifestyle and his mistrust.

=== Adam Carrington ===
Adam Carrington (Sam Underwood), Blake and Alexis's eldest son who was kidnapped as an infant, arrives in Atlanta looking to reclaim the life and family he was denied.

=== Dominique Deveraux ===
Dominique Deveraux (Michael Michele), Jeff and Monica's mother and Blake's half-sister, reappears in "New Lady in Town" after abandoning her family for a singing career in New York years before.

=== Liam Ridley ===
Liam Ridley (Adam Huber) meets and agrees to marry Fallon Carrington to thwart Jeff's plot against her. Over time, the business relationship evolves into a romantic one.

=== Amanda Carrington ===
Amanda Carrington (Eliza Bennett), Alexis' secret daughter by Blake who was raised by her cousin in England. She arrives in Atlanta in "The British Are Coming" after her adoptive mother dies, seeking answers about her biological family. Amanda is later involved in a lesbian relationship with Kirby Anders.

== Recurring ==
=== Introduced in season one ===
==== Matthew Blaisdel ====
Matthew Blaisdel (portrayed by Nick Wechsler) is Blake's top field engineer at Carrington Atlantic, and Cristal's former lover. Engaged to Blake, Cristal says goodbye to Matthew in "I Hardly Recognized You", and Fallon uses photos of their kiss to try to separate Cristal and Blake. Meanwhile, on his final job for Blake before he resigns, Matthew is injured in an explosion, and later dies. His widow, Claudia, accuses Blake of murder. The explosion is determined to have been caused by sabotage, and the Carringtons work to hide Cristal's connection to Matthew in "Spit It Out". Matthew's friend Willy Santiago tells Cristal that before his death, Matthew refused Blake's offer of a job transfer to China. Fallon leaks a sex tape of Cristal and Matthew in "Private as a Circus", and the Carringtons are cleared of wrongdoing in Matthew's death by Willy's suicide note. Confronting the Carringtons at gunpoint in "A Taste of Your Own Medicine", Claudia admits to setting the explosion that killed Matthew, though his death was not her intent. Claudia is subdued, and with Police Chief Stansfield's help, Blake sends Claudia to a sanitarium rather than prison. Matthew, not dead after all, visits Claudia at the facility in "Trashy Little Tramp", vengeful toward the Carringtons. He helps Claudia escape the sanitarium in "Dead Scratch", and they infiltrate the mansion. Claudia snaps and confronts Cristal with a gun. Matthew steps between them as Claudia fires, except that Matthew is a figment of her imagination, and Cristal takes the bullet.

Executive producer Sallie Patrick said of reimagining the character:

One big decision we had to make when rebooting Dynasty was what to do with Matthew Blaisdel ... Matthew was Cristal's on-again-off-again lover, and while we loved that part of Cristal's backstory and loved Matthew's crazy wife, Claudia, he didn't bring that much to the original series other than business stories, and the Shapiros encouraged us to focus more on family than business. So, when I was watching the original Dynasty pilot, there's this oil rigging accident Blake sets up in order to tank the price so he can swoop in and buy it out from under his competitor. The realization of this causes Walter Lankershim (Willy in our version) to crash the Carrington wedding with a gun. In our version, it made dramatic (and soapy) sense to have Matthew injured in the accident, sending his wife, Claudia, to the Carringtons' doorstep to give Cristal the news that her new husband may have killed her ex-lover. And that accusation—and the mystery surrounding it—is what launches us into series.

==== Claudia Blaisdel ====
Matthew's wife, Claudia Blaisdel (portrayed by Brianna Brown), is recovering from a head injury that has left her with memory loss. Distraught over Matthew's death, she accuses Blake of killing him.

==== Monica Colby ====
Jeff's sister Monica Colby (portrayed by Wakeema Hollis) is Fallon's best friend from high school. She is initially angry with her father Cesil for the crimes that landed him in jail, and with her mother Dominique Deveraux for abandoning the family years before.

==== Iris Machado and Alejandro Raya ====
Iris Machado (portrayed by Elena Tovar) is Cristal's sister and Sam's mother, first seen in flashback in "Guilt is for Insecure People". After stealing a fortune in cash, she and Cristal plan to flee Venezuela. Cristal arrives at their rendezvous point, but is forced to leave alone when Iris does not show up. In the present, Cristal learns through Sam that Iris is once again on the run and needs money, but Cristal is unable to access any funds without Anders knowing. Sam arranges a robbery at the mansion to come up with the money. Another flashback in "The Best Things in Life" reveals that Iris' abusive boyfriend Alejandro Raya (portrayed by Luis Fernández), who is Sam's father, was responsible for Cristal's miscarriage. Her need for medical care prompted the sisters to steal the money from Iris' criminal employers. In the present, Cristal receives a threat, and Anders helps her pay off her pursuers. Blake brings Iris to Atlanta for the holidays in "Rotten Things". Cristal and Anders discover that Iris was behind the extortion plot, and a confrontation with her sister causes Cristal to admit to Sam that she killed his father to defend Iris. Blake later greets a business associate, Diego Callestada, who is in fact Alejandro. He reveals himself to Cristal in "A Well-Dressed Tarantula", threatening to expose Blake's father's past crimes if she does not help him close a deal with Carrington Atlantic. Cristal and the Carringtons—with Sam's help—turn the tables on Alejandro and Iris. After being told by Cristal that they are no longer sisters, Iris chloroforms and abducts Fallon. In "I Answer to No Man", Alejandro and Iris hold Fallon hostage in a warehouse. Cristal delivers the ransom alone, and is taken as a hostage as well. She eventually convinces Iris that Alejandro is bad and will only turn on her, and as Alejandro tries to strangle Cristal, Iris shoots and kills him. The sisters reconcile. Cristal sends Iris off with some cash, and tells the police she shot Alejandro in self-defense, not Iris.

It's revealed in the fifth season that Sam's biological father is Daniel Ruiz, a horse trainer that Iris became romantically involved with during one of her separations from Alejandro. Iris kept Sam's paternity a secret. In "I'll Settle for a Prayer", Fallon finds Iris living in Idaho, consumed with guilt, and brings her back to Atlanta to reconcile with Sam and a terminally ill Daniel before his death.

==== Ted Dinard ====
Ted Dinard (portrayed by Michael Patrick Lane) is Steven's ex-boyfriend from New York, who reappears in "Company Slut". Sober for two years and working for the Sky Conservancy Organization, Ted apologizes to Steven for the dissolution of their relationship, which included a drug-addicted Ted accepting money from Blake to leave Steven. Steven is poised to forgive Ted, but finds that Ted has slept with Sam. In "The Best Things in Life", a distraught Steven does a line of cocaine and calls Ted to say that he is on his way to New York to see him. Steven's grandfather Thomas drags him back to Atlanta in "Rotten Things", followed by Ted. Though Steven plans to travel with Ted rather than go to rehab, Ted is arrested for drug possession and faces his third strike. Blake is unable to help because Jeff and Steven coerced Police Chief Stansfield to retire. Though Steven and an impressed Thomas believe that Blake set Ted up, Jeff is actually behind it. In "Nothing but Trouble", Steven decides to run for city council, and lets Ted know that tales of their wild past may become public. A distraught Ted, using drugs and believing that Sam and Steven are romantically involved, stages a scuffle with Sam and leaps out of an upper story window. He is brought unconscious to the hospital in "The Gospel According to Blake Carrington", and at Blake's urging, Steven spins the potentially negative publicity by pretending to be Ted's grieving partner. At Ted's hospital bedside, Steven manipulates Ted's religious father, Gerard "Gerry" Dinard (Stephan Jones), to reclaim Sam's missing earring from Ted's belongings. Ted wakes up, but his father whisks him off to rehab before he is able to say anything to the police about his fall.

Patrick said after the character's first appearance in November 2017, "Ted Dinard is a character from the OG Dynasty who played a big part in season 1...So let's just say, he'll be back."

==== Luella Culhane ====
Luella Culhane (portrayed by Arnetia Walker) is married to James, and Michael and Evie's mother. In "A Taste of Your Own Medicine", she and James are under the impression that Michael is a Vice President for Carrington Atlantic. Luella and James learn the truth when meeting Fallon Carrington, Michael's longtime lover, and learn that he is in fact the Carringtons' chauffeur. Luella struggles to get in contact with Michael in "Enter Alexis", and she reappears in "Don't Con a Con Artist" when James is hospitalized after falling deathly ill. In "Use or Be Used", Luella encourages Fallon to stay away from Michael due to the stress regarding James' health.

In the second season episode, "That Witch", Luella is displeased to learn that Fallon and Michael are engaged despite the Carringtons' involvement in the Clark County water scandal that caused James' death. Luella ultimately approves of Fallon and Michael's impending marriage, but she threatens Fallon if she hurts Michael. Jeff calls in a favor to Blake, who has Luella and Evie robbed in "The Sight of You" as revenge against Michael.

Luella reappears in the fifth season episode, "How Did the Board Meeting Go?", to give Michael advice about his quest for love. This advice proves successful, and Luella makes her final appearance in the series finale, "Catch 22", where she witnesses Michael marry Nina Fournier.

==== Cesil Colby ====
Cesil Baldwin Colby (portrayed by Hakeem Kae-Kazim) is Jeff and Monica's father. In "A Taste of Your Own Medicine", it is established that he is in jail. In "Rotten Things", Monica refuses Fallon's urging to visit him, and Cesil lashes out at Fallon. When Jeff visits, he and Cesil discuss their vendetta against Blake, who they say slept with Cesil's wife and framed him on drug charges. In "Nothing but Trouble", Blake tasks Anders to bribe a prison guard to stage an attack intended to prevent Cesil from being paroled. The parole board votes against his release, but Jeff sleeps with the parole commissioner, who sets Cesil free. Confined to Jeff's house with an ankle monitor in "The Gospel According to Blake Carrington", Cesil is compelled to go along with Jeff's plan to marry Fallon as a means to destroy Blake. However, seeing Jeff and Monica so close to Fallon and Michael at dinner sets Cesil off, and he angrily reveals to Fallon the crimes Blake has committed against the Colbys. When Fallon and Michael have left, Cesil tells Jeff that he is taking over the plot against Blake himself. In "Our Turn Now", the Carringtons are planning Jeff and Fallon's wedding, which is actually a diversion while they attempt to erase the data Jeff has stolen from them. Cesil refuses to attend the rehearsal, so Blake makes a personal plea to Cesil to put their differences aside and come to the wedding. The Carringtons manage to turn the tables on Jeff. A vengeful Cesil moves to confront Blake with a gun, but instead comes upon Thomas, who has a heart attack. Cesil flees at Jeff's urging, and Thomas admits to the Carringtons that Blake never had an affair, but was just covering for Thomas. As Jeff and Fallon's feud goes public in "Poor Little Rich Girl", Monica cuts ties with Jeff and takes guardianship of Cesil. Blake's ex-wife, Alexis, gets Cesil's house arrest extended in "A Line From the Past" as a way to re-fuel Jeff's vendetta against Blake. In addition, she reveals that he is a Carrington. As it turns out, Blake's closeness with Cesil's wife stemmed from the two of them being siblings rather than having an affair.

In the season two episode "Crazy Lady", it is confirmed that Cesil's house arrest has come to an end. Cesil helps Monica take care of Jeff after being poisoned in "New Lady in Town", the same time his ex-wife, Dominique Deveraux, returns from New York. Cesil welcomes Dominique back into the family, though Jeff and Monica are more hesitant.

Kae-Kazim was cast in November 2017.

==== Melissa Daniels ====
Melissa Daniels (portrayed by Kelly Rutherford) is introduced in the season one episode "Promises You Can't Keep" as a "spiraling lush" who is married to Senator Paul Daniels (portrayed by Rick Hearst). She gives Cristal advice about being married to a powerful man, noting her own husband's many infidelities. When Melissa reappears in "Poor Little Rich Girl", she is divorcing Paul following a scandal made public thanks to Cristal. Steven seeks help from Melissa, with whom he had an affair 10 years before, to secure an O-1 visa for Sam. Steven agrees to Melissa's demand that he have sex with her. In "Dead Scratch", Melissa reveals to Steven that she is pregnant with his child, moments before he is set to marry Sam.

In season two, Melissa's pregnancy is showing in "Twenty-Three Skidoo", but Steven has still not told Sam about it because Sam is mourning Cristal. In "Ship of Vipers", Sam and Alexis suspect that Melissa is not really pregnant, but they are proven wrong. Anders confirms that Steven is his biological child in "The Butler Did It". Now that she believes her baby is no longer a Carrington heir, Melissa admits that Steven is not the father.

Learning that she is the President of the Atlanta Historical Alliance in the season three episode "Wild Ghost Chase", Sam faces off with Melissa, who refuses to cancel the media day she has planned for his new hotel La Mirage even though its designer was an infamous homophobe. In the fifth season episode "Vicious Vendetta", Sam reveals that Melissa is in the middle of her third divorce.

Rutherford's initial casting was announced in November 2017.

==== Mrs. Gunnerson ====
Mrs. Gunnerson (Natalie Karp) is the long-time cook in the Carrington manor, introduced in "Don't Con a Con Artist" where Blake fires her to set an example for the household staff to not serve Alexis, who recently moved into the loft above the stables. Blake's actions are condemned by both Cristal and Joseph, and Mrs. Gunnerson is rehired. Blake's love for Mrs. Gunnerson's cooking is referenced throughout the series, and she is shown directing the kitchen staff for many events set at the manor. In "The Sensational Blake Carrington Trial", Mrs. Gunnerson is among the staff that Joseph interviews to determine who is acting as a mole for the prosecution. Mrs. Gunnerson last appears in "More Power to Her", as the kitchen prepares for Fallon and Liam's baby shower.

==== Tony ====
Tony first appears amongst the household staff in "Don't Con a Con Artist" as Blake instructs his employees to not serve Alexis, who recently moved into the loft above the stables. In "Snowflakes in Hell", Anders approaches Tony (portrayed by Bill Barrett) about taking over as his replacement once he steps down as majordomo.

In "Filthy Games", Tony (portrayed by Chase Anderson) is revealed to be in a relationship with housekeeper Joy. Alexis uses Tony's affair as blackmail throughout "Even Worms Can Procreate" to do her bidding when it comes to splitting up Blake and Cristal. In "Parisian Legend Has It...", Tony acts as Alexis's alibi for the time of Mark Jennings' murder and Cristal's miscarriage. Though Tony suspects Alexis was involved, he remains silent out of fear.

In "Guilt Trip to Alaska", Tony is mentioned to have rescued Liam from drowning in the Carringtons' pool. Tony is among the household staff investigated by Joseph in "The Sensational Blake Carrington Trial" when there is suspicions of a mole for the District Attorney in the manor. In "What Sorrows Are You Drowning?", a frightened Tony warns Alexis that Cristal is questioning the day of the accident, but Alexis maintains her innocence.

==== Hank Sullivan ====
Steven's search for his older brother Adam—kidnapped as an infant and never returned due to a trigger-happy police officer botching their exchange—leads him to Hank Sullivan (portrayed by Brent Antonello) in "A Line from the Past". Steven brings Hank/Adam home to Atlanta in "Trashy Little Tramp", where he is accepted by Alexis but rejected by Blake. Blake confides in Sam that the kidnappers cut off Adam's finger, though he never told Alexis. When it is revealed that Hank has a prosthetic finger, Blake is convinced of his identity. Hank later visits Alexis; he is actually her lover, with whom she is conspiring to amass enough Carrington Atlantic shares to seize control of the company. In "Dead Scratch", Hank is added to the Carrington trust along with newly-discovered Carringtons Jeff and Monica Colby, who declare their intention to force a sale of the company. Defying Alexis's orders, Hank is seduced by the money and votes with the Colbys. Cristal discovers Alexis and Hank's ruse, and he flees with Claudia.

Hank, who is the prime suspect in Cristal's murder, blackmails Alexis in "Twenty-Three Skidoo", threatening to expose their plan. He also reveals that he started the fire. Hank tries to sell the Rembrandt that Alexis gave him as collateral in "Queen of Cups", but she intervenes to keep him away from Blake. Claudia then berates Hank for his failure to get the money. In "That Witch", Hank cuts Claudia out of his payoff from Alexis. Realizing that Claudia is unhinged, he takes baby Matthew and leaves him on Alexis's doorstep.

=== Introduced in season two ===
==== Laura Van Kirk ====
Following the sudden death of her brother Max, Laura Van Kirk (portrayed by Sharon Lawrence) arrives in Atlanta in "The Butler Did It" to check up on her son Liam, as well as to meet her new daughter-in-law Fallon. Having suffered a nervous breakdown following the death of her first husband, Laura has spent years taking out her anger and frustration on Liam. Fallon ultimately stands up for Liam, creating conflict between the two women. Laura returns in "This Illness of Mine" with news that she has cancer, though this turns out to be a ruse to gain Liam's sympathy. Laura has been assisted in this by Fallon's brother Adam, with whom she has also been involved in a sexual relationship.

In "Caution Never Won a War", Laura sabotages Fallon's attempts to help Liam regain his memories of their relationship after he develops amnesia. She files for a restraining order against Fallon and remains by Liam's side in the hospital, making it impossible for Fallon to see him. In "Something Desperate", she works to keep Fallon away while speeding along Liam's impending wedding to Ashley, but Liam calls it off upon understanding that there is more to his forgotten life he needs to figure out on his own. It is revealed in "Is the Next Surgery on the House?" that Laura convinced Liam's former girlfriend Heidi to lie and say she was pregnant with his son when in reality her child belonged to Liam's father. With Liam cutting contact with his mother and pursuing his future with Fallon, Laura makes a deal with Blake to put an end to Fallon and Liam's engagement in exchange for her signing off on Carrington Atlantic being sold back to him. Though Blake double-crosses her in "She Cancelled...", Laura is convinced that their plan was a success, and she and Blake have sex. Laura arrives at Fallon and Liam's rehearsal dinner in "That Unfortunate Dinner" in hopes of making amends with Liam. Fallon reluctantly helps the two of them reconcile, but Laura's affair with Blake is exposed in the midst of Blake and Cristal's respective infidelity becoming a hot topic of discussion.

Adam makes a deal with Laura in "Do You Always Talk to Turtles", agreeing to get Laura into contact with Liam in exchange for Van Kirk Industries illegally importing the secret ingredient to his new anti-aging drug. Laura needs Liam's vote at the next Van Kirk Industries board meeting to secure her place as CEO. Liam refuses to help Laura, and in turn Laura publicly shames Fallon for being unable to conceive a child. When Liam sides with Fallon, Laura declares that she is cutting him out of her will. Before holding up her end of the deal with Adam, Laura becomes disoriented from injecting too much of Adam's anti-aging drug and trips, fatally impaling herself with the heel of her shoe.

Lawrence's casting was announced in August 2018, initially meant to appear in a single episode. The character was described as "so overpowering and manipulative that she puts Fallon's mother, Alexis, to shame."

==== Ada Stone ====
In "The Butler Did It", unscrupulous power broker Ada Stone (portrayed by Katherine LaNasa) blackmails Michael with information that will send Fallon to jail. Ada forces Michael into a high-stakes poker game run by a business rival to photograph documents for her in "Snowflakes in Hell", after which she arranges for the game to be raided by the FBI. In "Queen of Cups", Michael and Jeff work together against Ada, but she outmaneuvers them. Fallon and Monica's new business venture threatens Jeff and Michael's poker game in "A Temporary Infestation", which does not please Ada. Michael agrees to do one last job smuggling artifacts for Ada in "A Real Instinct for the Jugular", and talks his way out of a dangerous situation. She gives him all of her blackmail material on Fallon and a $5 million bonus, but asks him to keep working with her. In "Crazy Lady", Ada sets up Van Kirk Industries to be implicated in a drug smuggling operation, fully aware that Michael and Jeff would be caught in the FBI raid.

LaNasa is the real-life wife of Grant Show, who stars as Blake.

==== Ashley Cunningham ====
Introduced as Liam's girlfriend in "A Champagne Mood", Ashley Cunningham (portrayed by Taylor Black) comes from a wealthy New York-based family who are close with the Van Kirks. Fallon follows Liam and Ashley on their ski trip to Sun Valley in "The Sight of You", determined to win Liam back. This causes a war to break out between Fallon and Ashley, with Sam and Kirby sabotaging Ashley's spa treatment and Ashley starting a bar fight with Fallon and her friends. Though Liam and Ashley breakup shortly after, Fallon brings her back to Atlanta in "Life Is a Masquerade Party" to stir up publicity for Liam's new book. However, this erupts jealousy on Fallon's part.

Ashley reappears in "Guilt Trip to Alaska" after a near-fatal injury leaves Liam with amnesia. Ashley takes advantage of this by rekindling their relationship, with the help of Liam's mother Laura, and the two are set to marry in "Something Desperate". Fallon gets through to Liam, however, and he calls off the wedding in order to focus on himself until he fully regains his memory.

==== Allison ====
Fallon purchases and rebrands Elcott Publishing into Femperial Publishing in "Miserably Ungrateful Men", making Allison (portrayed by Nicole Zyana) her new executive assistant. Despite Fallon regularly intimidating and degrading her, Allison makes it clear in "She Cancelled..." that she still views Fallon as a great boss and even looks up to her as a role-model. In "My Hangover's Arrived", Sam has Allison attend Fallon's bachelorette party as their babysitter, but she ends up drinking as much as the rest of them and is found in the hospital the following day. Allison goes with Fallon and the others to retrace their steps of the previous night, and Allison flashes a bouncer in order for everyone to get past the gate and back into the club. On the plane ride home, they all look through pictures of the previous night and see Allison made out with a random woman. It is revealed in "New Hopes, New Beginnings" that Allison no longer works for Fallon.

==== Roberto "Beto" Flores ====
In "Motherly Overprotectiveness", Cristal (Ana Brenda Contreras) seeks out the help of her estranged family for a scheme to obtain land from Jeff Colby in order to build a stadium for the Atlantix. Cristal's brother, Beto (portrayed by Geovanni Gopradi), delivers the papers needed to put the land in her name, as well as a plane ticket to go visit their father. Beto returns in "Miserably Ungrateful Men" to make sure Cristal hires one of their father's pet players for the Atlantix in order to rig games. Sam is put off by Beto's seemingly homophobic nature but later catches him kissing another man. Sam convinces Beto to forgive Cristal for betraying their family, and Beto gives Cristal a dossier that their father has collected on her and the Carringtons. Cristal promises Beto in "Life is a Masquerade Party" that she will stop Blake from antagonizing their father any further.

Cristal (Daniella Alonso) calls Beto in "A Wound That May Never Heal" to put a hit out on Alexis Carrington. In "That Wicked Stepmother", the hit-man that Beto procured for Cristal backs out, so Beto agrees to finish the job by attaching a bomb to Alexis's car. This backfires as Beto attaches the bomb to the wrong car and is injured once it goes off. In "Up a Tree", Cristal uses the Carrington jet to get Beto out of the country before the police's investigation is able to piece anything together. In the fourth season, Beto seeks Cristal's help in "A Good Marriage in Every Sense" to provide the FBI with proof of their father's illegal gambling operations. Beto seduces Sam while Cristal weighs her options, but it is revealed that Beto turned their father in to assume control of Flores Incorporado for himself. Their father catches on and names Cristal CEO, so Beto vows revenge. He arrives with a loaded gun to Blake's political gala in "Filled with Manipulations and Deceptions", but someone else pulls the trigger first.

Cristal confronts Beto for his attempted assassination attempt in "Let's Start Over Again", and she disowns him. He later runs into Rita, a woman baring a striking resemblance to Cristal. He coaches Rita in Cristal's voice and mannerisms in "That Holiday Spirit", and he kidnaps Cristal in order for Rita to take her place in "How Did the Board Meeting Go?" Beto and Rita try to convince Blake to sign over Flores Incorporado in "Go Catch Your Horse", but Beto fails to realize that Rita is after Cristal's life. In "A Little Fun Wouldn't Hurt", Beto provides Rita with a solution to poison Blake, but their plan falls apart in "Devoting All of Her Energy to Hate" when Beto, seemingly in control of Flores Inc., shares a final farewell with Cristal before he returns to Mexico. In the meantime, Blake tracks down Cristal and has Rita arrested, and the contract Beto left with is null.

=== Introduced in season three ===
==== Evan Tate ====
Evan Tate (portrayed by Ken Kirby) is the older brother of Trixie, a friend of Fallon's who disappeared years prior. After Trixie's body is discovered in the Carringtons' lake, Evan becomes reacquainted with Fallon in "Wild Ghost Chase", pretending to forgive her only to then sabotage her community service in an attempt to see her end up in jail. Fallon discovers this and the two then truly make amends, Evan helping fix the damage he caused to Fallon's community garden. In "Mother? I'm at La Mirage", Evan is recruited to help Fallon get back her publishing company, and Evan's romantic feelings for her grow. However, he later admits to not wanting to be a pawn in her game to win back her former fiancé. Deciding that it is time to move on from Liam, Fallon decides to explore what she has with Evan. This is short-lived, as Fallon reconciles with Liam in "A Used Up Memory" and breaks things off with Evan. Unbeknownst to Fallon, however, Evan steals a clump of her hair from a brush.

Evan returns in "Robin Hood Rescues" after a lawsuit is filed against Fallon's company, which he secretly orchestrated in order to come out as Fallon's "hero". Fallon rejects his advances, committed to her love for Liam, and decides they shouldn't see each other anymore. Evan sabotages Fallon and Liam's wedding preparations in "That Unfortunate Dinner", flooding the venue and hospitalizing the officiant. A deranged Evan crashes Fallon's wedding in "Vows Are Still Sacred", demanding that Kirby share Fallon's location. When she refuses, he stabs her and takes her phone, tracking Fallon to her old high school's auditorium. Evan holds Fallon at knife-point, but Blake wrestles Evan and they go over the stage, unconscious. In "The Aftermath", it is revealed that Evan is arrested.

Kirby's casting was announced in September 2019.

==== Nadia ====
In "Mother? I'm at La Mirage", Cristal hires Nadia (portrayed by Kelli Barrett) as an orientation and mobility instructor for Adam after the loss of his eyesight. Adam initially rejects Nadia's assistance, but that changes once Nadia informs Adam of his stepmother's desire to have him sent away. Adam and Nadia continue to bond throughout "A Used Up Memory" where Nadia assists Adam in his meddling against his sister Fallon while also discovering Blake's updated will, revealing everything has been left to Cristal. Adam is crushed by this revelation, but he and Nadia share a kiss. In "Shoot From the Hip", Nadia assists in luring Cristal away from the manor during Thanksgiving so that Adam can prove to Blake that he is the only one there for his father. Cristal makes it home in time for Thanksgiving dinner and discovers Nadia has been helping Adam when she looks underneath the table and sees them holding hands. After dinner, however, Nadia meets with Fallon where it is revealed she has been paid to make Adam fall in love with her. In "The Sensational Blake Carrington Trial", Cristal plans to fire Nadia only to discover her secretly meeting with Fallon in the gun room. Cristal joins Nadia and Fallon in tricking Adam into believing that Nadia was sleeping with Blake, thus leading Adam to spiral and burn down the family's vineyard. Nadia leaves the manor for good once receiving the rest of the money owed to her by Fallon.

==== Vanessa Deveraux ====
In "Mother? I'm at La Mirage", Dominique discovers that her stepdaughter Vanessa (portrayed by Jade Payton) has secured a job as a bartender at Sam's hotel, La Mirage. With Dominique's help, Vanessa drugs Ashanti at the grand opening party and sings in her place. In "A Used Up Memory", Dominique proposes to Fallon and Monica that they sign Vanessa to their music label. Vanessa becomes romantically involved with Michael, which interferes with Dominique's plans for her. Dominique threatens Michael to stay away from Vanessa. He ignores her, and soon figures out that she is Vanessa's stepmother. In "Shoot from the Hip", Michael confronts Dominique and gives her one day to tell Jeff and Monica that Vanessa is their step-sister, or he will. Dominique convinces Blake to give her incriminating information on Michael, which she uses to silence him. Monica begins softening to Dominique and agrees to sign Vanessa to her label. Angry that Dominique is perpetuating the lie and has no intention of confessing, Vanessa reveals to a furious Monica that they are sisters. After Dominique makes a scene in court for publicity in "The Sensational Blake Carrington Trial", Vanessa accepts Monica's invitation to go to New York. Dominique gets Michael drunk and they have sex in "Battle Lines", but Vanessa returns to town and wants to date Michael. Dominique agrees to keep her night with Michael a secret, but she has surreptitiously recorded a video of their encounter on her phone. Michael and Vanessa resume their relationship in "That Wicked Stepmother", but it implodes when Dominique leaks her sex tape with Michael. The subsequent public confrontation with Michael and Vanessa secures Dominique's deal for a reality show. In "Up a Tree", Dominique tells Vanessa they need Michael on their reality show to tell the story properly. He agrees to film some scenes as a peace offering to Vanessa, and she later manipulates him into staying with the show. In "She Cancelled...", Anders shows Michael proof that Dominique and Vanessa are using him for the benefit of their show. The reality show gets cancelled in "Robin Hood Rescues" due to Dominique's outrageous demands, having been tricked into thinking she was being offered a talk show. Michael revels in the two of them having lost everything and breaks up with Vanessa, who then fires Dominique as her manager.

His interest in Dominique's storyline waning, Reed Gaudens of Hidden Remote wrote in his review of "Shoot from the Hip" that "Vanessa found a way to pull me back in when she threw her mother under the bus at Monica's Thanksgiving dinner."

==== Fletcher Myers ====
Brought on as a PR consultant for La Mirage in "Shoot From the Hip", Fletcher Myers (portrayed by Daniel Di Tomasso) initially clashes with Sam only for them to share a heated kiss following the resolution of a PR nightmare. Fletcher reappears in "The Caviar, I Trust, Is Not Burned" where he reciprocates feelings for Sam but made a vow to himself to not date clients. Sam solves this issue by firing him. After a mostly physical relationship, "What Sorrows Are You Drowning?" features Sam attempting to get Fletcher to open up more about himself. Michael Culhane hires Fletcher as The Atlantix's full-time PR consultant, and what was originally meant to be a date between Fletcher and Sam turns into a scheme to exposes investors' classism. Following their success, Fletcher comes to understand that Sam needs more than just sex, and so he agrees to be more open. Fletcher is hurt in "A Wound That May Never Heal" when Sam is hesitant to call him his boyfriend; however, Sam later discovers that Fletcher is married. Fletcher explains that he and his husband have an open marriage in "You See Most Things in Terms of Black & White" and convinces Sam to keep seeing him. Realizing that Sam won't let go of the possibility that Fletcher will leave his husband and knowing the heartbreak that will cause, Kirby reaches out to Fletcher and Fletcher ultimately breaks up with Sam.

In May 2020, showrunner Josh Reims expressed interest in bringing Fletcher back to introduce a possible love triangle between Sam, Fletcher, and Sam's new stripper husband Ryan, a storyline that would potentially play out in the fourth season. Fletcher reappears in "Your Sick and Self-Serving Vendetta", newly divorced and looking to get back together with Sam. Sam resists Fletcher's advances, but falls into bed with him after feeling neglected by his new boyfriend Ryan. The guilt eats away at Sam, and he confesses his infidelity to both Fletcher and Ryan in "I Hate to Spoil Your Memories", ending up with neither of them.

==== Heidi and Connor ====
Heidi (portrayed by Emily Rudd) dated Liam while the two attended school together in Switzerland but learned she was pregnant near the end of their relationship. With Liam expressing no interest in being a father, Heidi agreed to give the child up for adoption, only to change her mind at the last minute and raise her son, Connor (portrayed by John Jackson Hunter), all on her own. Liam remains oblivious of this until Heidi returns ten years later in "You See Most Things in Terms of Black & White", Connor wanting to know his father. Heidi leaves for a job interview in "That Wicked Stepmother", allowing for Connor to spend time with Liam and Fallon. Fallon grows jealous of Connor and schemes to get Heidi a job across the country to keep the two of them away. This backfires, but after Fallon and Liam make amends, they find that Heidi's abandoned Connor. In "Up a Tree", Fallon takes care of Connor while Liam tries to track Heidi down. Fallon grows close with Connor, but Heidi returns from a retreat, full of regret for leaving Connor behind. Heidi informs the couple that she and Connor will be leaving, but Fallon wants to fight for custody. Heidi ultimately reveals in "Is the Next Surgery on the House?" that Connor isn't Liam's son, but rather the son of Liam's deceased father, John Lowdon, and that his mother Laura helped her cover up the truth. Heidi and Connor leave town, but not before Liam promises to visit Connor regularly.

==== Caleb Collins ====
Cristal meets Father Caleb Collins (portrayed by Wil Traval) in "Is the Next Surgery on the House?". Trying to get her new veterans clinic off the ground, Cristal needs the approval of the hospital's chaplain, but a bad first encounter jeopardizes her plans. Cristal gets through to Caleb, however, and he confesses that he was simply flirting during their original meeting. In "She Cancelled...", Caleb winds up caught in the middle of Cristal's feud with her stepson, Adam. After a heated confrontation, the two embrace in a kiss, which Adam sees from a window. Cristal regrets kissing Caleb in "You Make Being a Priest Sound Like Something Bad", but soon learns that Blake cheated on her with Laura Van Kirk. As a result, Cristal ends up sleeping with Caleb. Cristal both leaves Blake and breaks things off with Caleb in "Robin Hood Rescues".

Father Collins attends Fallon and Liam's rehearsal dinner as their new officiant in "That Unfortunate Dinner", and Blake punches the priest after his affair with Cristal is exposed to the rest of the attendees. In "Vows Are Still Sacred", Cristal reunites with Caleb, who wants to leave the priesthood to be with Cristal in "The Aftermath". Caleb becomes weary about Blake's attempts to win Cristal back, and Blake later threatens him to leave Cristal alone in "Everybody Loves the Carringtons". Caleb informs Cristal of Blake's threats in "New Hopes, New Beginnings", but Cristal has a change of heart when she realizes Caleb's love for his job exceeds his love for her; they mutually agree to end their relationship. In "Vicious Vendetta", Cristal reveals that Caleb moved to a parish in Sicily.

Traval's casting was announced in February 2020.

==== Mia ====
Jeff met Mia (portrayed by Shannon Thornton) during freshman orientation week of college, though the timing did not line up because she had a boyfriend. The two finally hooked up after graduation, but Mia took a job in Philadelphia shortly after and Jeff did not want to pursue a long distance relationship. The two reunite in "You Make Being a Priest Sound Like Something Bad" when Mia returns to Atlanta. The two reconnect, and Mia learns that Jeff's marriage is a business arrangement, so they start seeing each other. Alexis walks in on the two in bed in "My Hangover's Arrived", and fearing what this could mean for her arrangement with Jeff, she schemes to make Jeff think that Mia is after his money. Seeing the lengths Alexis has gone through to keep him, Jeff parts ways with Mia to explore his feelings for Alexis.

Mia returns in "The Birthday Party" as an event coordinator where she mistakes Michael as a volunteer. The two bond even when Mia learns who Michael really is, but she wishes to keep their relationship strictly professional. Though Michael's feelings for Mia linger in "Your Sick and Self-Serving Vendetta", he initially steps aside when Jeff tries to win her back. However, the two bond over a game of mini-golf, and Mia decides she wants to date both of them. Jeff and Michael compete with one another to win Mia's affection in "Equal Justice for the Rich", but Mia chooses neither of them as she does not want to get in the way of their friendship.

==== Ryan ====
Ryan (portrayed by Lachlan Buchanan) works as a stripper by the name of Scorpio at The Anaconda Club where Fallon holds her bachelorette party in "My Hangover's Arrived". During a night of drinking and drug-infused antics, Ryan marries Sam. The two agree to an annulment the following day, but they decide to stay in touch. In May 2020, showrunner Josh Reims explained his intentions to have Ryan in the remaining episodes of the third season, as well as expressed interest in introducing a possible love triangle between Sam, Ryan, and Sam's married ex-boyfriend Fletcher in a storyline that would potentially play out in the fourth season.

Ryan and Sam officially annul their marriage in "That Unfortunate Dinner", but Sam grows skeptical when Ryan lies about his return flight home being canceled. Ryan explains his attempts at a grand romantic gesture in "Vows Are Still Sacred", and he and Sam decide to try being in a relationship. Ryan quickly grows overwhelmed by Sam's expensive gifts in "Everybody Loves the Carringtons", simply wanting to spend time with Sam. In "A Little Father-Daughter Chat", Sam creates a scholarship at Western Atlanta so that Ryan can move to Georgia and attend school without having to pay tuition. Ryan doesn't appreciate the gesture, but ultimately agrees to attend the school by accepting a loan from Michael. Ryan and Sam are both ready to commit to their relationship. Sam starts to feel neglected in their relationship and sleeps with his former boyfriend, Fletcher. Ryan learns the truth in "I Hate to Spoil Your Memories" when Sam and Fletcher bring business-partners to the club Ryan performs at. Ryan ends his relationship with Sam.

=== Introduced in season four ===
==== Colin McNaughton ====
Colin McNaughton (portrayed by Ashley Day) is the CEO of McNaughton Global Media who attended Wharton with Fallon until she had him expelled for cheating. Colin seeks revenge by having Fallon's building permits denied on a piece of Scottish land she has recently acquired which contains historical castle ruins. Though she considers selling Colin the land, Fallon ultimately concedes to have the land designated as a landmark, revising her construction plans and leaving Colin with nothing. Colin returns in "Stars Make You Smile" attempting a hostile takeover of Fallon Unlimited. Fallon outsmarts him once more, but she keeps him on as a consultant for the company while agreeing to have drinks with him. Fallon's scheming brings her and Colin closer together in "A Good Marriage in Every Sense", as he helps dig up dirt on her sister, Amanda. In "You Vicious, Miserable Liar," Fallon puts Colin in charge of Fallon Unlimited while she visits Los Angeles for a couple of days. She returns to Atlanta, convinced her marriage is over, and drunkenly hooks up with Colin in her office. Fallon immediately regrets her actions in "Affairs of State and Affairs of the Heart," and she and Colin amicably part ways as Fallon offers to buy out his company shares.

==== Oliver Noble ====
Oliver Noble (portrayed by Luke Cook) is Kirby's ex-boyfriend from her party days in Australia. Wanting to break up Kirby and Adam's relationship, Alexis calls Oliver to Atlanta in "The Birthday Party". Oliver reunites with Kirby at La Mirage in "Equal Justice for the Rich", claiming to be in town for a photography shoot. Oliver is recently sober, but as the two catch up, Kirby learns that his sobriety is limited, and he offers her cocaine. Oliver lands Kirby a modeling assignment in "I Hate to Spoil Your Memories", and Adam grows jealous of the two spending time together, and is concerned when he finds out Kirby has been abusing drugs. Anders also grows concerned about Kirby's well-being, and he comes to realize that Alexis's meddling brought Oliver to Atlanta. Anders blackmails Alexis into ending her scheme with Oliver in "A Public Forum for Her Lies", but he refuses to stand down. After being kicked out of the Manor and losing her relationship with Adam, Kirby supplies Oliver with drugs and the two run away together. In "Go Rescue Someone Else", Oliver and Kirby stay in a rundown apartment until Oliver decides they should return to Australia. Kirby overdoses, however, so Oliver abandons her in the apartment and calls for Alexis to clean up the mess that she started.

Cook's casting was announced in February 2021.

==== Leo Abbott ====
Leo Abbott (portrayed by David Aron Damane) is a contractor hired by Sam in "A Public Forum for Her Lies" to work on La Mirage's expansion. Michael immediately has doubts about the hire, and Leo threatens Sam when he tries to take back the offer. Michael learns of Leo's corruption in "Everything but Facing Reality", and he and Sam are further afraid when they find out Leo's corruption runs deep in Atlanta, having the chief of police on his side. In "Go Rescue Someone Else", Sam and Michael try to bribe Leo to leave the construction job, but Leo plans to use La Mirage to launder money. Sam and Michael tip off the IRS about fraudulent activity occurring in the hotel, hoping to scare Leo off. Leo is able to use his connections to close the case, but having figured out that Sam and Michael called in the tip, he threatens Michael by holding a broken bottle to his neck. Sam concocts an idea to get rid of Leo in "She Lives in a Showplace Penthouse" by tampering with a circuit to electrocute Leo and put him in the hospital. The electrocution works, but Leo knows who is responsible and vows revenge once he recovers. Sam and Michael go to Adam with their problem before Leo's operation. Leo goes into cardiac arrest right before his surgery, and Adam lets him die.

==== Eva ====
Eva (portrayed by Kara Royster) is introduced in "She Lives in a Showplace Penthouse" as the personal assistant of Claudette Kingsley, an executive Fallon wants to secure for her home shopping network. While Fallon's deal with Claudette falls through, Eva expresses admiration for Fallon and takes a job as her new assistant. She expresses additional admiration for Liam in "The British Are Coming," and she attends the Paysinger Awards to support him in Fallon's absence. In "Stars Make You Smile," Eva assists Fallon through Colin's attempted coup of her company while growing closer with an increasingly-neglected Liam. When Fallon fails to make it to their date night, Liam opts to go with Eva on a moonlight hike up on Kennesaw Mountain.

Royster's casting was announced in May 2021.

==== Ellen ====
Ellen (Grace Junot) is the head of the Fallon Unlimited board. She acts as an adversary to Fallon in the workplace, ultimately attempting a coup of the company.

==== Brady Lloyd ====
Brady Lloyd (portrayed by Randy J. Goodwin) is Dominique's estranged second husband. He was Dominique's music manager when she first moved to New York. They were quickly married, but their relationship only lasted for a year. First revealed in "Equal Justice for the Rich", Dominique shares with Alexis that when she and Brady separated, their divorce was never finalized and they are still legally married. Brady arrives in Atlanta in "Everything Looks Wonderful, Joseph" where he explains that he borrowed money from the wrong people and they threatened both him and Dominique, so he left in order to protect her. Despite Jeff suspecting ulterior motives, Dominique decides to give Brady another chance.

=== Introduced in season five ===
==== Rita ====
Rita (portrayed by Daniella Alonso) is a woman with an uncanny resemblance to Cristal Carrington. Cristal's brother, Beto Flores, meets Rita in a bar in "Let's Start Over Again". He trains her to emulate Cristal in "That Holiday Spirit". In "How Did the Board Meeting Go?", Beto abducts Cristal, and Rita takes her place with Blake. Blake eventually discovers the truth, identifies the real Cristal, and has Rita handed over to the authorities.

Executive producer and showrunner Josh Reims told Deadline Hollywood that he was most proud of Rita's storyline. "I had resisted doing it for a while, and then for some reason [season five] I was like, yeah, let's do it," Reims admitted, "It turned out to be really fun."

==== Dex Dexter ====
Farnsworth "Dex" Dexter (Pej Vahdat) is a businessman and longtime friend of the Carringtons. In "How Did the Board Meeting Go?", Amanda Carrington tracks crucial evidence to Dex that ultimately exonerates her mother Alexis Colby, who has been wrongly charged with murder. Dex and Alexis begin dating, and then marry.

Vahdat's casting was announced in January 2022.

==== Nina Fournier ====
Nina Fournier (portrayed by Felisha Terrell) goes on a blind date with Michael in "How Did the Board Meeting Go?" that results in conflict and ends on bad terms. The two later cross paths in "Go Catch a Horse" as Liam persuades Nina to direct the film adaptation of his book. Liam fears that Michael and Nina's disdain for one another will prevent Nina from directing his film, so he forges an apology from Michael that Nina quickly deduces to be untrue. Ultimately, Nina sets aside her disdain for Michael to work alongside Liam.

==== Daniel Ruiz ====
Daniel Ruiz (portrayed by Rogelio T. Ramos) is Sam's biological father that arrives in Atlanta in "Go Catch a Horse", hired to train Fallon's horse, Allegra. Daniel reveals Sam's true paternity in "A Little Fun Wouldn't Hurt" after Sam misinterprets their connection as potential for a new romance.

==== Charlie Jiménez ====
Charlie Jiménez (portrayed by Cynthia Quiles) signs Kirby as a client for her modeling agency in "Devoting All of Her Energy to Hate". Kirby finds herself attracted to Charlie in "A Real Actress Could Do It" and asks her out on a date after Charlie books her a shampoo commercial. Charlie initially rejects Kirby due to a personal policy to note date clients, but she changes her mind after she witnesses Kirby's confidence when filming the commercial. Amanda becomes suspicious of Charlie in "A Friendly Kiss Between Friends" when alerted by Michael that Charlie takes a drastic commission from another client, Sasha, whose career is in a similar state to Kirby's and struggles to find representation. Amanda goes to great lengths to expose Charlie, only to damage her new connection with Kirby. Charlie invites Kirby on a trip to Milan, but Amanda confesses romantic feelings to Kirby before she leaves. Kirby kisses Amanda before leaving with Charlie to Milan. In "There's No Need to Panic", Kirby reveals that she and Charlie broke up and agreed to remain friends.

==== Stacey Moore ====
Stacey Moore (portrayed by Samantha Massell) meets Fallon and Liam through a surrogacy agency in "Vicious Vendetta", a single mother to a son away at boarding school who specializes in archaeology. Stacey is selected as Fallon and Liam's surrogate, and she is confirmed to be pregnant in "Ben". Stacey moves into the Carrington manor for the duration of her pregnancy, during which she becomes romantically involved with Adam Carrington, beginning in "There's No One Around to Watch You Drown". Fallon struggles with Stacey's relationship with Adam over the next six months, and in "A Writer of Dubious Talent", Adam puts Stacey's pregnancy at risk as part of his scheme to be reinstated as chief of staff at the hospital. This comes to light ahead of Fallon and Liam's baby shower in "More Power to Her", when Stacey discovers what she believed to be saline in Adam's bag, used to treat mushroom poisoning from the dosed tea that he gave her. Stacey breaks up with Adam and informs Cristal, who officially banishes Adam from the manor. During the shower, Stacey reveals that Fallon and Liam will have a daughter. In "Catch 22", Stacey gives birth to Lauren Morrell Carrington-Ridley.

==== Ben Carrington ====
Ben Carrington (portrayed by Brett Tucker as an adult, Townsend Fallica as a child) is Blake's estranged younger brother, and Dominique's half-brother. He is first mentioned in the second season episode "Parisian Legend Has It..." when Fallon visits Ben's daughter Juliette in Paris. Thomas Carrington had disowned his younger son Ben, who subsequently married a French heiress.

In the fifth season, Blake is shocked when Ben appears at Alexis's wedding to Dex in "Vicious Vendetta". In "Ben", Blake tells Cristal and his children that Ben's negligence resulted in their recuperating mother's death, for which he was disowned by Thomas. Ben insists that what happened to their mother was an accident: he has always maintained that he left a note for Blake to care for their mother the night she died, and Blake has always denied receiving any such note. Ben asks Blake to publicly exonerate him, but Blake refuses. Soon, Blake finds himself accused of auctioning forged art, but camera footage from the Carrington compound shows Ben stealing the originals and replacing them with fakes. Ben's next move is to challenge their father's will in court. In "My Family, My Blood", Ben manipulates Dominique into leaking a fake legal strategy that misleads Blake. At the hearing in "There's No One Around to Watch You Drown", things look bad for Blake until Fallon proves that while the note did exist, Blake never saw it. Ben's lawsuit is dismissed, but is absolved of the negligence by Judge Drexel. When Blake reaches out for a truce, Ben vows that he is not finished trying to destroy Blake.

== Guest ==
Willy Santiago

Carrington Atlantic employee Willy Santiago (portrayed by Dave Maldonado) is with his friend, Matthew Blaisdel, when Matthew is killed in the aftermath of a suspicious explosion in "I Hardly Recognized You". He drunkenly confronts Cristal about her relationship with Matthew in "Spit It Out", and she fires him publicly to distract the press from the Carringtons' problems. In "Private as a Circus", Willy reaches out to Steven, who arrives to find him dead from an apparent suicide. Stansfield later reveals the existence of a suicide note in which Willy confesses to causing the explosion that killed Matthew. Claudia is revealed to actually be responsible for the explosion in "A Taste of Your Own Medicine".

According to Patrick, Willy is a revised version of Walter Lankershim (portrayed by Dale Robertson), a wildcatter who is a friend to Matthew and opposes Blake in the first season of the original series.

Aaron Stansfield

Atlanta Police Chief Aaron Stansfield (portrayed by Michael Beach) is a longtime friend of Blake's who tries to help the billionaire in "Spit It Out". He takes Matthew's phone from evidence lockup and gives it to Blake. Steven uses his knowledge of this to coerce Stansfield to clear him of Matthew's death in "Private as a Circus". Following Willy's suicide, Stansfield shows the Carringtons a convenient suicide note that exonerates them from any involvement. In "The Best Things in Life", Stansfield threatens Blake when Steven cuts off his illicit funding. The police chief turns the tables on Steven by revealing that he helped Blake cover up Steven's culpability in the accidental death of an oil rig worker. Stansfield accepts a $5 million payment from Jeff to retire and leave town, to be replaced by Jeff's cousin Bobbi.

Ramy Crockett

Desperate to get money for his mother in Venezuela, Sam has his friend Ramy Crockett (portrayed by Mustafa Elzein) rob Carrington Manor in "Guilt Is for Insecure People". This backfires in "Private as a Circus" once Ramy finds a sex tape of Cristal and Matthew on a phone that he stole. He tries to extort Sam for money, but a tipped-off Steven has the police arrest Ramy for the theft. Released from prison almost three years later, Ramy re-enters Sam's life in "Is the Next Surgery on the House?". Grateful that Ramy did not reveal Sam's part in the robbery to the police, he provides Ramy a room at La Mirage. Kirby does not trust Ramy, but Sam does, and regrets not staying in contact with Ramy while he was incarcerated. Ramy makes duplicates of Sam's La Mirage keys, and Kirby reaches her boiling point in "She Cancelled..." when Sam hires Ramy as Kirby's event coordinating assistant. Sam and Kirby suffer a falling out due to Sam ignoring Kirby's suspicions, and Sam soon realizes she is right when he finds that Ramy has stolen the bank deposits from his safe.

Kori Rucks

Introduced in "Private as a Circus", Kori Rucks (portrayed by KJ Smith) is an Atlanta councilwoman and former high school classmate of Fallon and Monica. She blocks Fallon in her attempt to secure an energy contract with the city for her new company, and then spends the night with Michael. Their new relationship survives Fallon's jealous meddling in "I Exist Only for Me". Kori rebuffs Fallon's overtures of friendship in "The Best Things in Life", but her relationship with Michael implodes over his lingering feelings for Fallon. Smith was cast in the recurring role in September 2017.

Thomas Carrington

Thomas Carrington (portrayed by Bill Smitrovich) is Blake's estranged father and the grandfather of Fallon and Steven, who arrives to celebrate Christmas in "Rotten Things". Dragging Steven home from his drug-fueled bender in New York with Ted, Thomas criticizes Blake's management of both his company and family, including Fallon's defection to Jeff. Thomas insists that Blake fire Steven. Insensitive to Steven's problems, Thomas is also dismissive to Cristal and her relatives, for whom he only has racist insults. Fallon finally calls him out as being stuck in the past. Thomas returns in "Our Turn Now", summoned by Cristal in an attempt to stop Fallon's faux wedding to Jeff, but he soon realizes the necessity of the plot. Thomas reports Sam to U.S. Immigration and Customs Enforcement, after which a confrontation with Cesil causes Thomas to have a heart attack. As he dies, he admits to the Carringtons that Blake never had an affair, but was just covering for him. Blake mourns in "Poor Little Rich Girl", and comes across a videotape of Thomas saying that he loves his son. At his funeral, Blake's long absent ex-wife Alexis reappears. In "Trashy Little Tramp", Jeff and Monica Colby learn from their grandmother that their mother, Millie, was fathered by Thomas. Alexis informs them that as Thomas' grandchildren, they are entitled to a portion of his shares in Carrington Atlantic. Jeff and Monica reveal their Carrington heritage in "Dead Scratch", and force a vote on a sale of the company.

Rick Morales

Rick Morales (portrayed by J. R. Cacia) is an ambitious reporter and old friend of Cristal's. The Carringtons throw a fundraiser for Senator Paul Daniels (portrayed by Rick Hearst) in "Promises You Can't Keep", and Rick tells Cristal that Blake regularly bribed Daniels when he was a judge. To avoid the truth coming out, Cristal gives Rick an alternative story about Daniels' many extramarital affairs. In "Nothing but Trouble", Cristal arranges for Rick to interview Steven, who is running for city council. A grateful Cristal kisses Rick. Blake discovers that Rick is working with Jeff in "The Gospel According to Blake Carrington", and insists that Cristal get as close to Rick as possible to find out what Jeff is up to, though she refuses. In "Our Turn Now", Blake arranges for Rick to get a lucrative new job out of state.

Lo Cox

Lo Cox (portrayed by L. Scott Caldwell) was Thomas Carrington's secretary at Carrington Atlantic in the 1970s. Lo and Thomas had an affair that resulted in the birth of their daughter, Millie. Lo kept Millie's paternity a secret for decades under Thomas' insistence, but she finally tells Millie, now Dominique, the truth once confronted by her grandchildren, Jeff and Monica. In "Trashy Little Tramp", Lo shares that because their mother is Blake's half-sister, Jeff and Monica are heirs entitled to shares of Carrington Atlantic. After a couple years, Lo (portrayed by Roxzanne Mimms) starts to reconnect with Dominique in "That Unfortunate Dinner". Lo reveals a key to a safety deposit box that was left to Dominique in Thomas' will in the hopes that whatever is inside will help Dominique to heal. Lo dies in her sleep in "New Hopes, New Beginnings", shortly after Dominique declined her phone call. Dominique and Jeff clash over the plans for Lo's funeral, but Dominique has a change of heart and delivers a eulogy where she vows to do better by her children.

Max Van Kirk

Max Van Kirk (portrayed by C. Thomas Howell) is Liam's uncle who purchases Carrington Atlantic, absorbing it into Van Kirk Industries. In "Ship of Vipers", Max threatens to decline the sale unless Fallon performs sexual favors for him, so Fallon blindfolds Max and leaves him with an escort meant to imitate her. In the process, Max dies of a heart attack.

Manuel

Manuel (portrayed by Yani Gellman) is a nanny hired by Sam and Kirby to help watch L. B. In "Crazy Lady", Manuel kidnaps L. B. after Sam fires him due to his sexual attraction to Manuel.

Mark Jennings

In "A Champagne Mood", Cristal texts "M. Jennings" that her baby is Blake's and not his, but she is not actually sure. Cristal confesses to Fallon in "The Sight of You" that her ex-husband Mark Jennings may be the father of her child. In "Filthy Games", Alexis learns that Cristal is unsure about the baby's paternity, and makes sure Blake finds out. When Alexis learns that Cristal's ex-husband Mark is the other potential father, she calls him. Mark (portrayed by Damon Dayoub) comes to Atlanta in "Even Worms Can Procreate", and Alexis tries to convince him that the baby is his. Mark shows up at the manor to get the truth from Cristal, and Blake—who wants to raise the baby as his own no matter what the paternity test results are—asks Mark to stay with the Carringtons until the test results come back. Alexis tells Mark that Cristal is still in love with him, and he and Cristal have a tender moment. Blake sees them together, and offers to have Mark's ban from professional soccer lifted if Mark leaves town. Cristal learns that the baby is Blake's. A distraught Alexis plans to commit suicide, but sees Cristal and Mark horseback riding and fires at Cristal instead. Mark takes the bullet and dies, and Cristal's frightened horse throws her.

Nathan "Mac" Macintosh

Nathan "Mac" Macintosh (Jeremy Davidson) is a hitman hired by Blake that he comes to believe is responsible for the murder of Mark Jennings and the reason for Cristal's miscarriage.

Victor Diaz

Victor Diaz (portrayed by Christian Ochoa) is a soccer player for The Atlantix. Victor immediately attracts Kirby, and the two spend a night together which causes further tension between Kirby and Michael. In "Mother? I'm at La Mirage", Victor reveals to Michael that he is in debt to the Cuban Mafia. Michael provides security measures at La Mirage, but Sam posts a photo of him and Victor with Ashanti to Instagram which results in the Mafia finding his whereabouts. Victor's kneecaps are beaten in the back alley of La Mirage, but Michael is able to safe him before any further damage.

Joel Turner

Joel Turner (portrayed by Pierson Fodé) is a motivational speaker whose self-help compound Kirby disappears to before she is located by Fallon and Adam. Fodé appears in the episodes "A Used Up Memory" (2019) and "What Sorrows Are You Drowning?" (2020).

Bill North and Katy Lofflan

Bill North (portrayed by Kevin Kilner) and Katy Lofflan (Stephanie Kurtzuba)

Patty and Peter De Vilbis

Patricia "Patty" De Vilbis (portrayed by Carson Fagerbakke) and Peter De Vilbis (portrayed by Bill Fagerbakke)

Sasha Harris

Sasha Harris (portrayed by Yvonne Pearson) is a model friend of Kirby, who becomes romantically involved with Michael Culhane.

Sonya Jackson

Sonya Jackson (portrayed by Daphne Zuniga) is an old friend of Blake's, who he attended university with.

Samir Dexter

Samir Dexter (portrayed by David Diaan) is the father of Farnsworth "Dex" Dexter, and an old friend of Blake's, having served on the board of Carrington Atlantic. In "Vicious Vendetta", Dex leads Alexis to believe that Samir will not attend their wedding because of a falling out between father and son, but when Alexis talks to Samir about the wedding, he reveals that she is the problem. Samir has heard from Blake the horror stories of their marriage, so Alexis convinces Blake to try and undo the damage. Now believing that Alexis is a recovering alcoholic, Samir attends the wedding and welcomes her to the family. A public spat with Dominique subsequently confirms for Samir that Alexis is not right for his son.

Professor Kingston

Professor M. Kingston (portrayed by Danny Nucci) is a published author and writing mentor to Liam Ridley. Upon his sudden death, Liam steals Kingston's unfinished manuscript and moves to publish it as his own.

Geneva Abbott

Geneva Abbott (portrayed by Carly Hughes) develops an immediate connection with Michael upon her first arrival at the Sahara Club in "My Family, My Blood". Michael learns that Geneva is the widow of Leo Abbott, the crooked contractor whose death Michael aided in.

Kevin

Kevin (portrayed by Henry Simmons) is hired by FSN to act as Dominique's bodyguard after a sequence of anonymous threats. Dominique initially rejects Kevin's presence, but their resentment turns into admiration and eventual passion. FSN releases Kevin from his post in "More Power to Her", which allows for him and Dominique to embrace in a tryst. Six months later, in "Catch 22", Dominique reveals that Kevin is waiting for her in New York, where she is opening her first clothing boutique.

Florence Whitley

Right Honourable Lady Justice Florence Whitley (portrayed by Kate Beahan) had an affair with Amanda Bedford that, when leaked, cost Amanda her internship and professional reputation. Florence visits Amanda in "More Power to Her" with a job offer. In "Catch 22", Kirby spies on Amanda during her meeting with Florence, insecure in their strained relationship. Kirby later confronts Florence and accuses her of manipulating Amanda with the job offer to win her back. Florence rebuffs this, as her intent is to provide Amanda with an opportunity to achieve all that she has ever wanted.

== Celebrity guests ==
- Jamal Anderson ("A Taste of Your Own Medicine", 2017)
- Hines Ward ("A Taste of Your Own Medicine", 2017)
- Julia Haart ("Use or Be Used", 2018)
- Alex Belle ("A Temporary Infestation", 2018)
- Isis Valentino ("A Temporary Infestation", 2018)
- Stéphane Rolland ("Parisian Legend Has It...", 2019)
- Ashanti ("Mother? I'm at La Mirage", 2019)
- Danny Trejo ("Robin Hood Rescues", 2020)
- Brian Littrell ("Everybody Loves the Carringtons", 2021)
- NeNe Leakes ("The British Are Coming", 2021)
- Angeria Paris VanMicheals ("Ben", 2022)
