= Dynasty (2017 TV series) season 3 =

Dynasty
- Season 3
- Promotional poster
- Starring: Elizabeth Gillies; Daniella Alonso; Rafael de La Fuente; Sam Underwood; Michael Michele; Robert Christopher Riley; Sam Adegoke; Maddison Brown; Adam Huber; Alan Dale; Grant Show; Elaine Hendrix
- No. of episodes: 20

Release
- Original network: The CW
- Original release: October 11, 2019 – May 8, 2020

Season chronology
- ← Previous; Season 2 Next → Season 4

The third season of Dynasty, an American television series based on the 1980s prime time soap opera of the same name, premiered in the United States on The CW on October 11, 2019. The season is produced by CBS Television Studios, with Josh Reims as showrunner and executive producer alongside executive producers Josh Schwartz and Stephanie Savage. Dynasty was renewed for a third season on January 31, 2019, and for a fourth season on January 10, 2020. Production of season three was suspended in March 2020 as a direct result of the COVID-19 pandemic, with only 20 of a planned 22 episodes completed.

Season three stars Elizabeth Gillies as Fallon Carrington, Grant Show as her father Blake Carrington, Daniella Alonso (replacing Ana Brenda Contreras) as Blake's new wife Cristal, and Sam Underwood as Fallon's brother Adam Carrington, with Robert Christopher Riley as Michael Culhane, Sam Adegoke as Jeff Colby, Rafael de la Fuente as Sam Jones, Adam Huber as Fallon's fiancé Liam Ridley, Alan Dale as Joseph Anders, Maddison Brown as Kirby, and Michael Michele as Dominique Deveraux. New series regular Elaine Hendrix takes over the role of Alexis Carrington. Notable recurring characters featured in season three include Monica Colby (Wakeema Hollis); Laura Van Kirk (Sharon Lawrence); Vanessa Deveraux (Jade Payton); and Fletcher Myers (Daniel Di Tomasso).

== Cast and characters ==
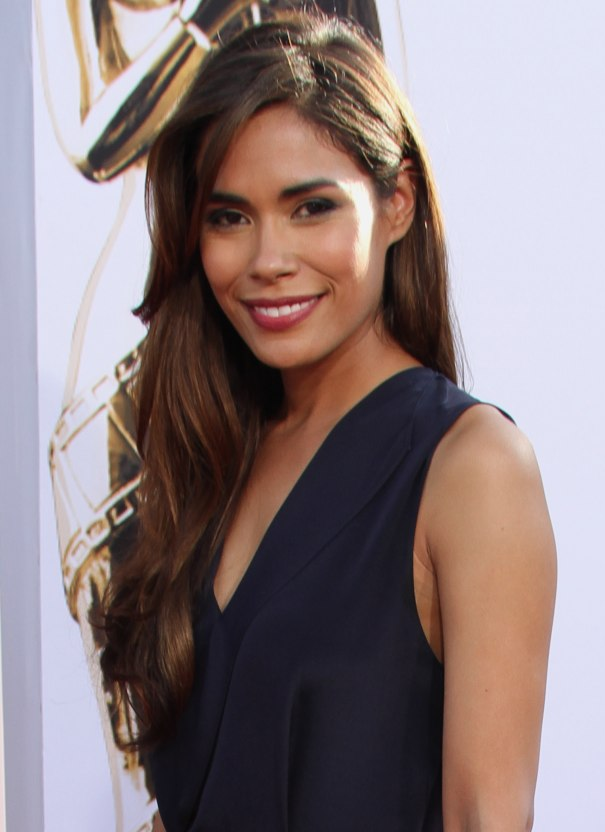
Daniella Alonso portrays Cristal starting in season three.

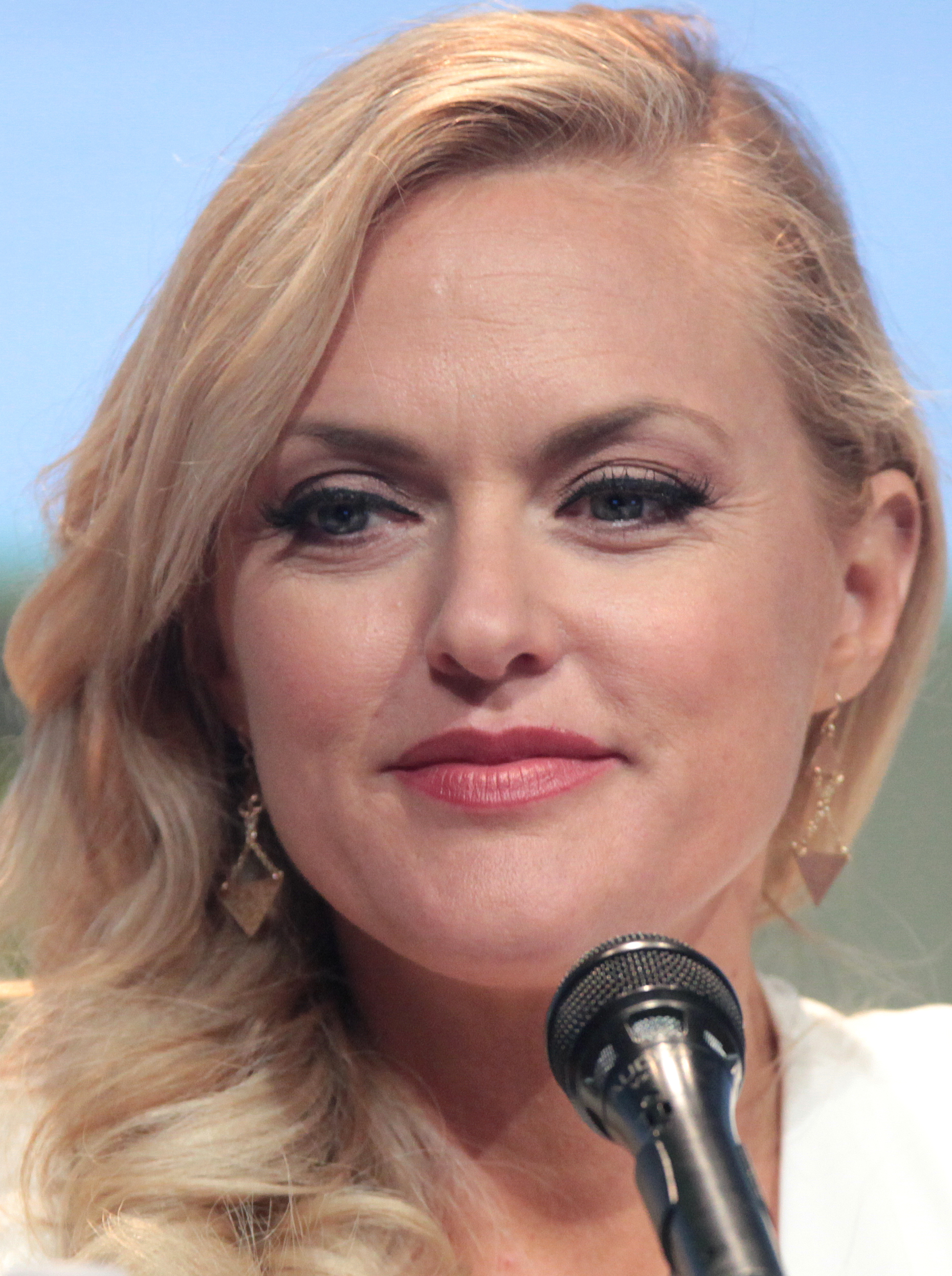
Elaine Hendrix plays Alexis Carrington starting in season three.

=== Main ===
- Elizabeth Gillies as Fallon Carrington, a self-made CEO and heiress who is the daughter of billionaire Blake Carrington and his first wife, Alexis
- Daniella Alonso as Cristal Jennings Carrington, a physical therapist who becomes Blake's third wife
- Rafael de La Fuente as Samuel Josiah "Sammy Jo" Jones Carrington, nephew of Blake's second wife Celia, and Steven Carrington's ex-husband
- Sam Underwood as Adam Carrington, Blake and Alexis's eldest son, a doctor
- Michael Michele as Dominique Deveraux, Jeff and Monica's mother and Blake's half-sister
- Robert Christopher Riley as Michael Culhane, Fallon's ex-fiancé, formerly the Carrington chauffeur
- Sam Adegoke as Jeff Colby, Dominique's son and Blake's nephew, a billionaire tech genius
- Maddison Brown as Kirby Anders, Joseph's daughter
- Adam Huber as Liam Ridley, Fallon's fiancé
- Alan Dale as Joseph Anders, the Carrington majordomo
- Grant Show as Blake Carrington, billionaire and the father of Adam and Fallon by his first wife, Alexis
- Elaine Hendrix as Alexis Carrington Colby, (Note: Hendrix is credited as a regular beginning in "The Sensational Blake Carrington Trial".) Blake's ex-wife, Jeff's current wife and Adam, Steven, and Fallon's mother.

=== Recurring ===
- Wakeema Hollis as Monica Colby, Jeff's sister
- Kelli Barrett as Nadia, Adam's physical therapist
- Jade Payton as Vanessa Deveraux, an aspiring singer who is Dominique's stepdaughter
- Daniel Di Tomasso as Fletcher Myers, a public relations consultant
- Emily Rudd as Heidi, Liam's former girlfriend
- John Jackson Hunter as Connor, Heidi's young son
- Sharon Lawrence as Laura Van Kirk, Liam's mother
- Ken Kirby as Evan Tate, brother of Fallon's late childhood friend Trixie

=== Guest ===
- Taylor Black as Ashley Cunningham, Liam's ex-fiancée
- Jessi Goei as Trixie Tate, Fallon's late childhood friend
- Rob Nagle as Mitchell, Blake's lawyer
- Kelly Rutherford as Melissa Daniels, Steven's former lover
- Chase Anderson as Tony, the Carrington gardener
- Natalie Karp as Mrs. Gunnerson, the Carrington cook
- Christian Ochoa as Victor, a new player on the Atlantix
- Ashanti as herself
- Pierson Fodé as Joel Turner, a motivational speaker who becomes involved with Kirby
- Chukwudi Iwuji as Landon, a creative director and old friend of Liam
- Erin Cummings as District Attorney Erica Brown, the prosecutor in Blake's murder trial
- Nicole Zyana as Allison, Fallon's assistant
- Keller Wortham as Jacks Davis, Fallon's real estate agent
- Lilli Cooper as Stacey, a reality show producer
- Geovanni Gopradi as Roberto "Beto" Flores, Cristal's brother, an enforcer for the Flores cartel
- Wil Traval as Father Caleb Collins, a priest who is the new hospital chaplain
- Mustafa Elzein as Ramy Crockett, Sam's criminal friend
- Alice Hunter as Sydney Newlove, a fashion podcaster
- Shannon Thornton as Mia, a college friend of Jeff's
- Laura Osnes as Donna, a singer in the duo Kelly and Donna
- Najah Bradley as Kelly, a singer in the duo Kelly and Donna
- Aerica D'Amaro as Dr. Bailey, Adam's supervisor at the hospital
- Danny Trejo as himself
- Lachlan Buchanan as Ryan, a stripper Sam briefly marries

Cast notes

== Episodes ==
Dynasty season 3 episodes
No. overall	No. in season	Title	Directed by	Written by	Original release date	U.S. viewers (millions)
45	1	"Guilt Trip to Alaska"	Michael A. Allowitz	Josh Reims	October 11, 2019	0.45
The Carringtons deal with the discovery of the bodies in the lake. As Liam lies in a coma, Fallon begins seeing Trixie everywhere she goes. Adam tries to kill Liam in the hospital, but is interrupted by Fallon. Ashley arrives, and when Liam wakes up, he does not remember Fallon. Dominique plays the worried mother for the press, but still claims her payoff from Blake for getting Jeff out of town. Sam begins renovating his hotel, and Blake kicks Kirby out of the Manor. Adam sneaks into the morgue and arranges for Mack's body to be cremated, but Blake is arrested anyway. Fallon confesses to the police that Trixie's fall was an accident, and lies that Mack disposed of the body on his own.
46	2	"Caution Never Won a War"	Melanie Mayron	David M. Israel	October 18, 2019	0.41
Blake is booked, the police having found his DNA inside Mack's body bag. Fallon pulls out all the stops to get Liam to remember her, but his mother Laura does her best to thwart Fallon's efforts. Sam and Anders discover that the hotel is historically significant. Sam arranges a media day to capitalize on this fact, only to learn that the hotel's famous designer was an outspoken homophobe. Adam outmaneuvers Cristal to be named temporary CEO of Blake's winery. In jail, Michael tries to intimidate Blake to goad him into incriminating himself. When Blake is overheard threatening to have Michael dumped in the lake, Michael is set free and Blake's bail is denied. Fallon is sentenced to community service. Michael allows Kirby to stay in his apartment, but after his release it becomes clear their relationship is in trouble. Cristal marries Blake in jail, and puts both Dominique and Adam on notice. Laura obtains a restraining order to keep Fallon away from Liam.
47	3	"Wild Ghost Chase"	Jeff Byrd	Christopher Fife	October 25, 2019	0.42
Learning that she is the President of the Atlanta Historical Alliance, Sam faces off with Melissa, who refuses to cancel the media day she has planned for his hotel. Dominique makes a play to gain control of Jeff's money. Fallon reconnects with Trixie's older brother Evan. Monica learns that Jeff's cufflink is not in police evidence, and Dominique drugs her to delay her investigation. Fallon gives Michael her shares in the Atlantix, making him the majority owner. Cristal helps Blake stage an attack by another prisoner, causing the judge to grant Blake bail. Fallon attacks Adam for sabotaging her community service assignment, and Blake finally admits to Fallon that Adam is out of control. Fallon learns that Evan was the one who destroyed her garden, and they make amends. Jeff returns, and he and Monica cut ties with Dominique for her machinations.
48	4	"Something Desperate"	Kenny Leon	Jenna Richman	November 1, 2019	0.35
Fallon sneaks onto Laura's property to give Liam's original manuscript to him, hoping it will trigger memories of their relationship. She is caught by Laura, and learns that Liam and Ashley are getting married that day. The Carringtons host a wine tasting event to promote Blake's winery, and though Adam attempts to sabotage Cristal's efforts, she turns the tables on him and regains Blake's support. Thanks to a gas leak in her bedroom, Fallon hallucinates several musical numbers involving herself and the family. At Fallon's urging, Sam talks his way in to see Liam and gives him the manuscript. Liam reads it and does not marry Ashley, but tells Fallon he still does not remember her, and wants to be on his own. Jeff enlists Dominique to disrupt Adam's winery event as a condition of his mother getting back into his good graces. Attempting to turn off the gas, Adam is caught in an explosion and believes he may be permanently blinded. Though Dominique's plan had been to tamper with the wine, she insinuates to Jeff and Monica that she caused the explosion.
49	5	"Mother? I'm at La Mirage"	Brandi Bradburn	Liz Sczudlo	November 8, 2019	0.35
When Kirby declines Fallon's offer to buy Femperial, Fallon sabotages Kirby's hiring of a new CEO. Dominique discovers that her stepdaughter Vanessa has secured a job as a bartender at Sam's hotel, La Mirage. With Dominique's help, Vanessa drugs Ashanti at the grand opening party and sings in her place. Blind but back at home, Adam refuses the help of physical therapist Nadia, but relents when he learns that Blake and Cristal are considering sending him away to a special facility. Michael is annoyed to learn that Kirby is sleeping with his new player Victor. A tough judge is assigned to Blake's murder trial, so Cristal blackmails him to recuse himself from the case. Jeff tells Dominique about his medical condition. Adam and Nadia learn that they have a mutual dislike of Cristal. Victor is attacked, and Michael intervenes. Just as Fallon moves on from Liam with Evan, Liam begins to remember their past together.
50	6	"A Used Up Memory"	Matt Earl Beesley	Kevin A. Garnett	November 15, 2019	0.38
Dominique proposes to Fallon and Monica that they sign Vanessa to their music label. Liam asks Fallon to dinner, hoping to recover more memories. Vanessa becomes romantically involved with Michael, which interferes with Dominique's plans for her. Nadia helps Adam arrange for Evan to see Fallon with Liam. A possessive Evan warns Liam to keep away from Fallon. Blake puts his ankle monitor on Cristal so he can leave the Manor to meet the bailiff handling his jury, and asks that the jury be sequestered at La Mirage. Jeff nearly catches him, but manages to eliminate Blake's arrangement with the bailiff. Dominique threatens Michael to stay away from Vanessa. He ignores her, and soon figures out that she is Vanessa's stepmother. Nadia peeks at Blake's latest will and tells Adam that he made Cristal the sole heir. Liam's memories return, and he and Fallon reunite.
51	7	"Shoot from the Hip"	Geoff Shotz	Paula Sabbaga	November 22, 2019	0.44
With his trial approaching, Blake asks Adam and Cristal to make amends. Adam strands Cristal away from the Manor so she misses Blake's family photo. Fallon is worried that Liam will forget her again, and he is angry to discover she lied to him to keep him close. Michael gives Dominique one day to tell Jeff and Monica that Vanessa is their step-sister. Dominique convinces Blake to give her incriminating information on Michael, which she uses to silence him. Just as Monica is softening to Dominique and agrees to sign Vanessa to her label, Vanessa reveals that they are sisters. Trying to deflect the negative effect of Victor's attack on La Mirage's image, Sam clashes with public relations consultant Fletcher Myers. Sam turns things around on his own, and an apologetic Fletcher kisses him. Feeling that he has helped Sam all he can, Anders resigns from the hotel and returns to the Manor. At Thanksgiving dinner, Cristal defends Adam to Blake, but then spots Adam and Nadia holding hands under the table. After dinner, Adam and Nadia kiss and have sex, and Cristal tells Adam his days at the Manor are numbered. Nadia is secretly working for Fallon.
52	8	"The Sensational Blake Carrington Trial"	Melanie Mayron	Francisca X. Hu	December 6, 2019	0.37
Michael, Fallon, and Anders are subpoenaed by the prosecution. Monica is still angry at Dominique, but Jeff is unfazed, having accepted his mother and her many flaws. Cristal learns that Nadia is plotting with Fallon, and joins them. The trio stages a confrontation for Adam's benefit in which Nadia admits to having an affair with Blake and using Adam to make him jealous. Michael's testimony against Blake is damning, and when Fallon's testimony proves incriminating, he gives his lawyer permission to eviscerate her on the stand. Anders accepts the DA's offer of immunity to testify against Blake, but says on the stand that he killed Mack himself in self-defense. Monica is going to New York to open another Club Colby, and asks Vanessa to come with her. After Dominique makes a scene in court for publicity, Vanessa decides to go with Monica. Adam's sight returns, and he sets Blake's vineyard on fire. Fallon realizes that he can see, and Liam remembers that it was Adam who hit him over the head. In the barn, they struggle at the edge of the loft door. Alexis returns to testify against Blake, having married Jeff.
53	9	"The Caviar, I Trust, Is Not Burned"	Jeff Byrd	Aubrey Villalobos Karr	January 17, 2020	0.34
Adam saves Liam from falling but then falls himself, though he escapes with minor injuries. Alexis testifies that she saw Blake murder Mack. Fallon visits Jeff and Alexis ostensibly to reconnect with her mother, but actually to find her datebook to prove she was not home when she said she was. While Cristal helps Blake have a juror replaced, Fallon is able to prove that Alexis is lying, resulting in a mistrial. Dominique is especially upset over Jeff's marriage, and confronts Alexis. Later, Dominique takes a public tumble down the courthouse stairs and makes it look like Alexis pushed her. Sam reconnects with Fletcher. Adam tries to make things up to Blake for torching the vineyard, but Blake tells him to leave the Manor. Adam moves into Alexis's vacated loft. Fallon tricks Cristal into revealing that Blake did kill Mack. Alexis reaffirms her commitment to help Jeff destroy Blake.
54	10	"What Sorrows Are You Drowning?"	Pascal Verschooris	Libby Wells	January 24, 2020	0.34
Jeff gives his Atlantix shares to Michael, making him majority owner. As their romantic relationship develops, Sam and Fletcher help Michael entertain potential sponsors. Anders seeks Fallon's help to track down Kirby, who has run off with motivational speaker Joel Turner and sold Femperial. Fallon recruits Adam to help her infiltrate the self-help compound by interviewing for a doctor position. Posing as Adam's wife, Fallon finds Kirby, but she has no interest in leaving. Fallon apologizes for trying to make Kirby's decisions for her, and Kirby decides to come home. Cristal finds a custom Carrington bullet near the spot where Mark was killed and her horse threw her. Tony suggests it belonged to Mack, and then reports to Alexis and reminds her he lied to the police to give her an alibi for Mark's murder. Alexis comes to the Manor to collect the gun she used, just as Cristal's investigation convinces her that Mack did not kill Mark. Cristal confronts Alexis, and when she confesses, they brawl in the lily pond. Blake cannot get his Greater Georgia Yacht Club membership reinstated, so he blackmails the president. The symptoms of Jeff's illness become increasingly apparent. Fallon moves out of the Manor.
55	11	"A Wound That May Never Heal"	Brandi Bradburn	Bryce Schramm	January 31, 2020	0.34
When Blake's new business interests threaten Fallon's fledgling streaming service, she plans an impromptu promotional halftime extravaganza at an Atlantix game that literally goes up in flames. Sam and Fletcher's deepening relationship implodes over Sam's involvement in Fallon's stunt. Kirby and Adam get closer. Alexis learns that Adam has been staying in her loft, and manipulates him into helping her and Jeff in their plot against Blake. Sam learns that Fletcher is married. Alexis convinces Adam to confess to poisoning Jeff on camera as a means for Adam to ingratiate himself to Jeff. Blake decides he wants Carrington Atlantic back just as Jeff and Alexis use blackmail to force a sale of the company. Unable to deal with her fury toward Alexis and realizing that Blake will never punish his ex-wife, Cristal calls her brother to ask for his help in killing Alexis.
56	12	"Battle Lines"	Matt Earl Beesley	Christopher Fife	February 7, 2020	0.31
Blake and Anders learn that Jeff and Alexis are trying to acquire Carrington Atlantic. Fallon's ruthless side comes out as she attempts to buy a house. Dominique gets Michael drunk and they have sex, but Vanessa returns to town and wants to date Michael. Dominique agrees to keep her night with Michael a secret, but she has surreptitiously recorded a video of their encounter on her phone. Sam is heartbroken over Fletcher. Kirby invites Adam to a "secret admirer" party at La Mirage, and they end up sleeping together. Blake enlists Dominique to help him against Jeff and Alexis, and her price is moving into the Manor. Jeff initiates the purchase of a pharmaceutical company working on a cure for his condition, but Blake buys it out from under him as a bargaining chip to get Carrington Atlantic.
57	13	"You See Most Things in Terms of Black & White"	Heather Tom	David M. Israel	February 21, 2020	0.32
Fallon accompanies Liam on a trip to London to pitch a book idea, which puts her planned proposal to him on hold. Cristal is annoyed by Dominique's presence at the Manor. Fletcher apologizes to Sam, explaining that he has an open marriage. Sam is willing to resume their relationship, but when Kirby presses Fletcher to be honest with Sam about their future, Fletcher breaks up with him. Dominique meets with a reality show producer who is interested in a show revolving around her and Cristal, but Dominique is unable to make any inroads with her sister-in-law. Adam has not responded to Kirby's messages, but they have sex in Blake's office when she catches him sneaking into the Manor. Admitting that his book pitch is a ruse, Liam proposes to a surprised Fallon, and she accepts. Cristal pays an assassin to kill Alexis. Liam's ex-girlfriend Heidi appears with their young son Connor.
58	14	"That Wicked Stepmother"	Brandi Bradburn	Garrett Oakley	February 28, 2020	0.34
Cristal's plan to assassinate Alexis with a car bomb falls apart. Beto arrives to talk her out of it, but eventually agrees to help her. Blake manipulates Adam into helping him against Jeff and Alexis, but Adam double crosses his father, guaranteeing that Jeff will secure control of Carrington Atlantic. Liam introduces Fallon to Heidi and Connor, who are considering relocating to Atlanta. Feeling threatened by Liam's new "family", Fallon overcompensates, upsetting Liam when she gets Heidi a job in San Diego. Just when Fallon thinks her relationship with Liam is in jeopardy, he admits that he is unsure he can handle being a father. Michael and Vanessa resume their relationship, which implodes when Dominique leaks her sex tape with Michael. The subsequent public confrontation with Michael and Vanessa secures Dominique's deal for a reality show, House of Deveraux. Alexis cheats death when Beto plants the explosives under the wrong SUV. He is injured, but survives. Heidi leaves Connor with Liam and Fallon.
59	15	"Up a Tree"	Andi Behring	Jenna Richman	March 27, 2020	0.32
Dominique tells Vanessa they need Michael on their reality show to tell the story properly. He agrees to film some scenes as a peace offering to Vanessa. Adam has been reinstated as a doctor. Alexis coerces him into helping an ailing Jeff by procuring experimental drugs not yet approved for Jeff's condition. Cristal transports a wounded Beto out of the country to avoid further police scrutiny. She confesses to Blake that she tried to kill Alexis, and Blake is understanding. Jeff refuses any help from Adam, so Alexis administers the drugs without Jeff knowing. While Liam looks for Heidi, Fallon watches Connor. She accidentally tells him that his mother has run away. They eventually bond when Fallon admits that her mother abandoned her too. Connor falls into the Carrington lake, but is saved by Liam and Michael. Though Michael's sex tape has sponsors dropping the Atlantix, Vanessa releases a video of him helping save Connor that reverses the trend. Heidi returns, but Fallon wants Liam to fight for his rights as the father. Dominique and Vanessa celebrate the fact that Vanessa has manipulated Michael into staying with the show. Jeff collapses.
60	16	"Is the Next Surgery on the House?"	Michael A. Allowitz	Liz Sczudlo	April 3, 2020	0.32
When Heidi refuses Liam's request that she and Connor relocate to Atlanta, Fallon goes to Blake for help making Heidi look like an unfit mother. Adam and Alexis scheme to steal a donor liver for Jeff, but they fail. Sam's friend Ramy gets out of jail and Sam lets him stay at La Mirage, but Ramy is soon back to his thieving ways. Seeking absolution for her recent sins, Cristal attempts to get her veterans clinic off the ground, but finds herself scheming again. Sam hires Kirby to work for him at La Mirage. Heidi reveals that she had an affair with Liam's father, making Connor his brother and not his son. Learning that his mother Laura made Heidi lie and swore her to secrecy, Liam severs ties with Laura. Adam decides to donate a portion of his own liver to Jeff even though he may not survive the surgery due to previously donating. Laura visits Blake and offers to block the sale of Carrington Atlantic to Jeff in favor of Blake if he breaks up Liam and Fallon.
61	17	"She Cancelled..."	Pascal Verschooris	Kevin A. Garnett	April 10, 2020	0.38
Laura explains to Blake that she is on the verge of closing an oil deal in Moldavia. She needs to keep Liam single a bit longer because he will inherit a large amount of shares in Van Kirk Industries when he marries, and would be likely to interfere with the deal. Adam insinuates himself into the planning of Cristal's fundraising gala. Dominique throws a birthday party for Michael, but Anders shows him proof that Dominique and Vanessa are manipulating him for the benefit of their show. Sam hires Ramy as Kirby's assistant, to her chagrin. Ramy steals cash from Sam's safe, and Sam and Kirby have a falling out over it. Laura is delighted when she and Blake manipulate Liam into an argument with Fallon that threatens their wedding, but it is all a ruse staged by Blake, Liam and Fallon. Cristal and Father Caleb acknowledge their attraction to each other, and Adam is watching when Caleb kisses her. Having closed her Moldavian deal quickly and on the verge of restoring Carrington Atlantic to Blake, a triumphant Laura kisses him.
62	18	"You Make Being a Priest Sound Like Something Bad"	Elodie Keene	Aubrey Villalobos Karr	April 17, 2020	0.30
Fallon tries to secure Liam's favorite singing duo, Kelly and Donna, to sing at their wedding. Kirby is still mad at Sam, but her sexual relationship with Adam has resumed. Adam's supervisor, Dr. Bailey, threatens to have him fired for stealing drugs for Jeff, but intimates that she might forget about it if he stops rejecting her advances. Cristal feels guilty about kissing Caleb. Blake buys her a diamond necklace that, according to Fallon, means Blake has done something bad, and Cristal soon figures out that he slept with Laura. Jeff and Sam bond, and Jeff realizes that his marriage to Alexis only made sense when he thought he was dying. Blake misses Cristal's hospital gala to deal with a crisis involving Carrington Atlantic oil tankers in Moldavia. Kirby coerces Cristal into getting Adam out of trouble by threatening to reveal the secret that Cristal kissed Caleb. Fallon embarrasses herself trying to impress Kelly and Donna, but steps in to sing with Donna when Kelly falls ill. Caleb comes to Cristal's rescue, and they have sex. Michael asks Fallon to help him get back at Dominique and Vanessa. Adam tells Cristal that Blake and Anders have been kidnapped in Moldavia.
63	19	"Robin Hood Rescues"	Jeff Byrd	Paula Sabbaga	May 1, 2020	0.32
Blake and Anders are imprisoned in a Moldavian dungeon by the king, but Blake refuses to hand over his oil, believing he needs to maintain control of the tankers or he and Anders will be executed. A guilty Cristal breaks things off with Caleb. Adam and Liam head to Moldavia despite Cristal's protests, with Sam as a stowaway. Fallon is sued for bad advice Alexis gave in her podcast, but they discover it is a scam. Dominique sabotages negotiations for House of Deveraux after being offered a talk show, which Michael later reveals is a lie to get his revenge on her. Adam and Liam are captured and imprisoned after being betrayed by Liam's contact. A drunk Sam sneaks into the palace in a laundry bin, crawls through an air vent, and rescues the group while guided by a hallucination of Danny Trejo. Adam has to stay behind, but escapes wearing a borrowed military uniform. Blake liberates his oil, and Adam is upset that Blake risked all of their lives for greed. Blake hires Adam as his protégé, but Adam vows to destroy Blake. Evan is revealed to have orchestrated the phony lawsuit against Fallon. Cristal leaves Blake.
64	20	"My Hangover's Arrived"	Gina Lamar	Francisca X. Hu	May 8, 2020	0.37
Adam begins sabotaging Carrington Atlantic, but is outmaneuvered by Blake. Fallon, Kirby, Cristal and Sam wake up after Fallon's bachelorette party, missing their phones and purses and with no memory of the night before. They retrace their steps, which culminates in the discovery that Sam married a stripper named Scorpio. Alexis finds Jeff in bed with Mia, and he asks for a divorce. Alexis conspires to make Jeff think Mia is a prostitute, but he sees through the ruse. Anders discovers that Adam has a juvenile record of violence, and then learns that Kirby is dating Adam. Deducing that Adam pushed Alexis into the fire, he warns Kirby, who dismisses the allegations. Alexis confesses her feelings for Jeff, and they have sex. Adam arranges an explosion at a Carrington Atlantic oil refinery. Anders travels to Montana to investigate Adam further.

== Production ==
=== Development ===
Dynasty was renewed for a third season on January 31, 2019. In May 2019, Deadline Hollywood reported that co-executive producer Josh Reims would succeed co-creator Sallie Patrick as executive producer and showrunner for season three. On January 7, 2020, Dynasty was renewed for a fourth season.

=== Casting ===
In July 2019, it was announced that Ana Brenda Contreras would not be returning for season three for personal reasons, and that Daniella Alonso would take over the role of Cristal. In August 2019, it was reported that Michael Michele had been promoted to a series regular for the third season, and it was announced in October 2019 that Adam Huber had been promoted to a series regular as well. On September 5, 2019, Ken Kirby was announced to be joining the show in a recurring role as Evan Tate, Trixie's older brother. Kelli Barrett and Jade Payton also joined the show in recurring roles, Barrett acting as Adam's nurse, Nadia, and Payton portraying Dominique's stepdaughter, Vanessa.

On October 28, 2019, it was announced that the role of Alexis Carrington had been recast with Elaine Hendrix, who would appear as a series regular. The CW noted that "Alexis is back in Atlanta, with a new look, a new man, and plenty of scores to settle". Hendrix debuted as Alexis in "The Sensational Blake Carrington Trial". In February 2020, it was announced that Wil Traval had been cast to recur as Father Caleb Collins, a "young, charming and irreverent priest with a soft spot for the disabled vets who rehab in the hospital's clinic." He was teased as a potential love interest for Cristal. Danny Trejo appeared as himself in the May 2020 episode "Robin Hood Rescues".

=== Filming ===
Production of Dynasty was suspended in March 2020 as a direct result of the COVID-19 pandemic. Filming of only 20 of the 22 ordered episodes of the third season had been completed at that time. Gillies said, "So there is no finale at this juncture, and there is no episode before the finale. So it ends in a very weird place ... I don't know if we'll pick up the finale later, I’m not sure what the plan is. It certainly shouldn't end on the episode we finished, because it's just really random and nothing’s resolved. I apologize if it does." It was later confirmed that the 20th episode of the season, "My Hangover's Arrived", would serve as the season finale, though it has not been announced whether the remaining two episodes of the season will be produced later.

Reims said in May 2020 that the writers had been building to Fallon and Liam's wedding all season, and it was "frustrating" to not be able to film the last two episodes. Hoping to use reworked versions of the two scripts to start the fourth season, Reims teased Blake going to war with Alexis, Jeff and Adam; Sam's new relationship with Ryan; and the return of the Moldavians.

== Broadcast ==
Season three of Dynasty premiered on October 11, 2019, and the season finale aired on May 8, 2020. Unlike previous seasons, the full third season was released globally on Netflix on May 23, 2020, a few weeks after the season finale.

== Reception ==
Season three debuted at No. 1 on Netflix's list of most watched series for the week of May 18 through May 24, 2020.

=== Ratings ===
Viewership and ratings per episode of Dynasty
No.	Title	Air date	Rating/share (18–49)	Viewers (millions)	DVR (18–49)	DVR viewers (millions)	Total (18–49)	Total viewers (millions)
1	"Guilt Trip to Alaska"	October 11, 2019	0.1/1	0.45	0.1	0.22	0.2	0.67
2	"Caution Never Won a War"	October 18, 2019	0.1/1	0.41	0.1	0.23	0.2	0.64
3	"Wild Ghost Chase"	October 25, 2019	0.1/1	0.42	0.1	0.21	0.2	0.63
4	"Something Desperate"	November 1, 2019	0.1/1	0.35	0.1	0.28	0.2	0.63
5	"Mother? I'm at La Mirage"	November 8, 2019	0.1/1	0.35	0.1	0.25	0.2	0.60
6	"A Used Up Memory"	November 15, 2019	0.1/1	0.38	0.1	0.27	0.2	0.65
7	"Shoot from the Hip"	November 22, 2019	0.1/1	0.44	0.1	0.23	0.2	0.67
8	"The Sensational Blake Carrington Trial"	December 6, 2019	0.1/1	0.37	0.1	0.24	0.2	0.61
9	"The Caviar, I Trust, Is Not Burned"	January 17, 2020	0.1/0	0.34	TBD	TBD	TBD	TBD
10	"What Sorrows Are You Drowning?"	January 24, 2020	0.1/1	0.34	TBD	TBD	TBD	TBD
11	"A Wound That May Never Heal"	January 31, 2020	0.1	0.34	TBD	TBD	TBD	TBD
12	"Battle Lines"	February 7, 2020	0.1	0.31	TBD	TBD	TBD	TBD
13	"You See Most Things in Terms of Black & White"	February 21, 2020	0.1	0.32	TBD	TBD	TBD	TBD
14	"That Wicked Stepmother"	February 28, 2020	0.1	0.34	TBD	TBD	TBD	TBD
15	"Up a Tree"	March 27, 2020	0.1	0.32	TBD	TBD	TBD	TBD
16	"Is the Next Surgery on the House?"	April 3, 2020	0.1	0.32	TBD	TBD	TBD	TBD
17	"She Cancelled..."	April 10, 2020	0.1	0.38	TBD	TBD	TBD	TBD
18	"You Make Being a Priest Sound Like Something Bad"	April 17, 2020	0.1	0.30	TBD	TBD	TBD	TBD
19	"Robin Hood Rescues"	May 1, 2020	0.1	0.32	TBD	TBD	TBD	TBD
20	"My Hangover's Arrived"	May 8, 2020	0.1	0.37	TBD	TBD	TBD	TBD
