= To Kill a Wolf =

- Directed by: Kelsey Taylor
- Written by: Kelsey Taylor
- Starring: Maddison Brown; Ivan Martin
- Release date: August 2024 (Edinburgh)
- Running time: 92 minutes
- Country: United States
- Language: English

To Kill a Wolf is a 2024 American mystery drama film written and directed by Kelsey Taylor and starring Maddison Brown and Ivan Martin. It is Taylor’s feature directorial debut.

== Cast ==
- Maddison Brown as Dani
- Ivan Martin as The Woodsman

== Production ==
The film was shot in Mount Hood National Forest.

== Release ==
The film premiered at the Edinburgh International Film Festival in August 2024. Then it was released in the United States on August 15, 2025.

== Reception ==
The film has a 100% rating on Rotten Tomatoes based on 27 reviews. Clint Worthington of RogerEbert.com awarded the film three stars out of four. Julian Roman of MovieWeb rated the film a four out of five. Benjamin Franz of Film Threat rated the film an 8 out of 10.

Peter Martin of ScreenAnarchy gave the film a positive review and wrote, “Quietly affecting and deeply moving, To Kill a Wolf avoids shouting and yelling. The characters would rather use a rifle than a machine gun. They want everything they say to land as is intended. The film is all the more powerful because of that restraint.”
