= Elena Tovar =

Mexican-American actress

- Born: Linda Elena Tovar; Mexico
- Occupation: Actress
- Years active: 2007–present

Linda Elena Tovar is a Mexican-American actress. After leaving Mexico, Tovar moved to New York City and began appearing in off-Broadway shows, before working in television.

== Career ==
Tovar is known for her recurring role as Rosalie Martinez on the ABC daytime soap opera General Hospital from 2014 to 2015. In 2015, she was nominated for a Daytime Emmy Award for Outstanding Special Guest Performer in a Drama Series for this role. She has appeared on Modern Family, CSI: NY, Criminal Minds, and NCIS: New Orleans.

In 2017, Tovar was cast in a recurring role as Iris Machado in The CW prime time soap opera reboot Dynasty.

In 2018, Tovar was cast in a recurring role in the third season of Netflix's Designated Survivor as Isabel Pardo.

== Filmography ==
Year	Title	Role	Notes
2007	Spiker	Erin Cole	
2009	Fake Marriage	Lyla	Short film
2010	Moving Forward	Reporter	Short film
2011	Femme Fatales	Elena Machado	Episode: "Something Like Murder"
2011	All God's Creatures	Hipster Girl	
2012	Modern Family	Juanita	Episode: "Baby on Board"
2012	Man from Shaolin	Alexa	
2012	Joy Incorporated	Chloe	
2013	CSI: NY	Victoria Jimenez	Episode: "Today Is Life"
2013	The Honey Maple Morgan	Marita	Short film
2015	Criminal Minds	Lizette Castro	Episode: "Protection"
2015	NCIS: New Orleans	Lucia	Episode: "My City"
2014–2015	General Hospital	Rosalie Martinez	Recurring role Nominated — Daytime Emmy Award for Outstanding Special Guest Performer in a Drama Series (2015)
2016	Ceresia	Leila	
2017–2018, 2022	Dynasty	Iris Machado	Recurring role, 6 episodes
2018	Burying Yasmeen	Shannon	
2018	Reverie	Young Pilar	Episode: "Despedida"
2019	Designated Survivor	Isabel Pardo	Recurring role
