= Jade Payton =

American actress (born 1992)

- Born: September 5, 1992 (age 32); Nevada, U.S.
- Occupation: Actress
- Years active: 2017–present

Jade Payton (born September 5, 1992) is an American actress. She is known for her roles in the YouTube Red comedy series Good Game (2017), and the Netflix comedy series Glamorous (2023).

== Early life and education ==
Payton completed her Bachelor of Arts in Stage and Screen Acting in her hometown at the University of Nevada, Las Vegas. She then completed her Master of Fine Arts in Acting from the University of California, Irvine.

== Career ==
In 2017, Payton starred in the short-lived YouTube Red comedy series, Good Game. She portrayed Samantha "Sam" Kinsey, a fiercely competitive tennis player. From 2018 to 2019, she portrayed the recurring role of Jordan Gladwell in fourth and fifth season of The CW's supernatural procedural comedy crime drama series, iZombie. From 2019 to 2020, she portrayed the recurring role of Vanessa Deveraux in the third season of The CW's drama series reboot based on the 1980s prime time soap opera of the same name.

On February 21, 2019, Variety announced that Payton was cast opposite Brooke Shields in Glamorous, a pilot for The CW, directed by Eva Longoria. The network passed on the series later in the year, and the options for the cast expired at the end of June. However, in 2022, Netflix picked up Glamorous with a 10-episode, straight-to-series order. On June 22, 2022, Payton was confirmed to star in the redeveloped series as Venetia, while Shields was replaced by Kim Cattrall. Glamorous premiered in July 2023, but was canceled after one season.

== Filmography ==
| Year | Title | Role | Notes |
|---|---|---|---|
| 2017 | Good Game | Samantha "Sam" Kinsey | Series regular |
| 2018–2019 | iZombie | Jordan Gladwell | Recurring role; 9 episodes |
| 2019, 2022 | The Rookie | Dominique Grey | Episodes: "Flesh and Blood" (2019), "Take Back" (2022) |
| 2019 | Daybreak | Demi Anderson | Recurring role; 4 episodes |
| 2019–2020 | Dynasty | Vanessa Deveraux | Recurring role; 9 episodes |
| 2023 | Glamorous | Venetia Kelaher | Series regular |
