= Strangerland =

2015 film directed by Kim Farrant

- Theatrical release poster
- Directed by: Kim Farrant
- Written by: Fiona Seres; Michael Kinirons
- Produced by: Naomi Wenck; Macdara Kelleher
- Starring: Nicole Kidman; Joseph Fiennes; Hugo Weaving; Lisa Flanagan; Meyne Wyatt; Maddison Brown; Nicholas Hamilton
- Cinematography: P.J. Dillon
- Edited by: Veronika Jenet
- Music by: Keefus Ciancia
- Production companies: Worldview Entertainment; Dragonfly Pictures; Fastnet Films
- Distributed by: Transmission Films (Australia and New Zealand); Wildcard Distribution (Ireland); Alchemy (United States)
- Release dates: 23 January 2015 (Sundance Film Festival); 10 July 2015 (United States)
- Running time: 111 minutes
- Countries: Australia; France; Ireland; United States
- Language: English
- Budget: $10 million
- Box office: $1 million

Strangerland is a 2015 drama suspense film directed by Kim Farrant in her directorial debut, and written by Michael Kinirons and Fiona Seres. The film stars Nicole Kidman, Joseph Fiennes, and Hugo Weaving. The film premiered at the Sundance Film Festival on 23 January 2015. The film did not have a theatrical release in its native Australia, but did receive a limited release in cinemas in the United States on 10 July 2015 by Alchemy.

== Plot ==
Catherine and Matthew Parker move with their children Lily and Tom to the remote Australian desert town of Nathgari. Although the family is unhappy with the move, Matthew and Tom blame Lily for forcing them to leave the larger town of Coonaburra. When he can't sleep, Tom sometimes walks around the neighbourhood at night, an activity his parents discourage. One night, Matthew sees Tom leave the house, followed by Lily. He says nothing and goes back to sleep. The next morning, Catherine oversleeps. When she cannot find the children, she calls Matthew at work. He reassures her that they must be at school, but school officials told her Tom and Lily had not been attending. She's even more worried when an haboob hits the town. Matthew, not wanting his family's business known, discourages her from contacting authorities. Against his wishes, Catherine contacts several people, including police.

Detective David Rae discovers Lily had been reported missing previously. Catherine and Matthew reluctantly reveal that she had disappeared for two days, but soon turned up at a friend's house. Rae learns that Lily had been having sex with her Coonaburra teacher, Neil McPherson, and Matthew assaulted McPherson, earning a restraining order. To Rae, the Parkers admit they left Coonaburra to escape the shame.

Catherine becomes frustrated with Matthew's focus as a pharmacist regardless of the community's reliance on his services. Rae's investigation reveals Lily had multiple sexual relationships despite being only fifteen. Catherine reluctantly reads Lily's diary, with its irate, angsty, and hyper-sexualised imagery, including poetry and pictures of her lovers; McPherson, the Parkers' challenged handyman Burtie, and local youth Steve, aka "Slug." It also describes her parents' marriage as a sham, which brings Catherine to tears. Catherine turns the diary over to Rae, asking that he not reveal it to Matthew.

Matthew drives to Coonaburra, where he questions and threatens McPherson. Coreen, Rae's girlfriend and Burtie's sister, becomes annoyed when Rae won't share details of the case with her. She's also jealous, fearing Rae's attraction to Catherine. Rae secretly shreds diary pages that connect Burtie to Lily, and discourages Burtie from self-incrimination. Rae arrests Slug, but releases him for lack of testimony and evidence.

The town organises a search party. Matthew refuses to participate, further angering Catherine. Rae suggests her children might have run away for reasons closer to home. With Lily's sexual inclinations and Matthew's reluctance to help search, Catherine asks if he ever molested her. Incredulous, he denies it. Upon learning Burtie had sex with Lily, Matthew beats up Burtie and searches his house. Coreen demands Rae arrest Matthew, and accuses him of taking the Parkers' side; Rae reveals Burtie's conduct.

Burtie tries speaking with Matthew, who's not home. He leaves after Catherine invites him in, attempting to seduce him while wearing Lily's clothes. Matthew searches the desert alone in the opposite direction, and finds Tom delirious from dehydration. Catherine yells at Tom for refusing to speak. He eventually tells Matthew he saw Lily get into a car.

Catherine overhears locals speculating on Lily's disappearance and likely death. She's distraught after a caller labels Lily "a whore". Desperate, she visits Rae, and when she fails to seduce him, wanders into the desert at night, alone in despair. The next morning, traumatised and stripped naked, she reappears in town and all the men gawp at her. Matthew rescues and tenderly bathes her. Holding each other in bed, Catherine admits she hid Lily's diary from Matthew, and he reveals he saw them leave that night. He admits he did not stop them because he was angry and wanted to punish Lily. Catherine hugs Tom and walks onto the porch, where she and Matthew console each other. While holding Lily's diary, Matthew cries and says that he wishes he could take back that one moment.

Two passages of Lily's poetry are heard in her voice over aerial imagery of the vast outstretching Outback – Lily's fate is left uncertain.

== Cast ==
- Nicole Kidman as Catherine Parker
- Joseph Fiennes as Matthew Parker
- Hugo Weaving as David Rae
- Lisa Flanagan as Coreen
- Meyne Wyatt as Burtie
- Maddison Brown as Lily Parker
- Nicholas Hamilton as Tom Parker
- Martin Dingle-Wall as Neil McPherson

== Production ==
On 20 October 2013, Nicole Kidman, Guy Pearce, and Hugo Weaving joined the cast of the thriller film. Screen Australia announced it would finance the film. Macdara Kelleher and Naomi Wench were announced as producers, and Kim Farrant was announced as director, with a script by Fiona Seres and Michael Kinirons. The other cast members announced included Lisa Flanagan, Martin Dingle-Wall, Meyne Wyatt and Nicholas Hamilton. On 13 March 2014, Joseph Fiennes joined the film, replacing Pearce. On 27 March 2014, it was announced that Maddison Brown had landed a lead role in the film to debut her acting career, which Worldview Entertainment would finance.

=== Filming ===
On 27 March 2014, it was announced that the shooting of the film was set to start in the last week of March in Sydney. The filming was also set to take place in Canowindra and Broken Hill in New South Wales, and Alice Springs in the Northern Territory. Shooting began on 31 March 2014.

== Release ==
The film had its world premiere at the Sundance Film Festival on 23 January 2015. Shortly after the premiere, Alchemy acquired the US distribution rights to the film. The film went on to screen at the Belgrade Film Festival, Seattle International Film Festival, Sydney Film Festival. The film was released in the United States on 10 July 2015 in a limited release and through video on demand.

The film did not release to cinemas in Australia, but was released to DVD, Blu-Ray & Digital by Transmission.

== Reception ==
=== Marketing ===
An image and a new synopsis was revealed on 5 May 2014. On 3 June 2015, the official poster was released.

=== Critical response ===
Strangerland was met with mixed to negative reviews, earning a 40% approval rating on Rotten Tomatoes based on 65 critics with a weighted average score of 5.17/10. The site's consensus: "Strangerland has a marvelous cast, but their efforts aren't enough to overcome the story's blandly predictable melodrama.". Metacritic reports a normalized score of 42 out of 100, based on 13 critics, indicating "mixed or average reviews".

Brad Wheeler of The Globe and Mail gave a positive review, calling it "Eerie and unpredictable, Strangerland holds attention, even if traditional suspense tricks are avoided like they were dingos at the daycare." Matthew Lickona of San Diego Reader commented "Director Kim Farrant goes for a feeling that's as harsh, unforgiving, and wild as the land she lets the camera linger on, and it's the right idea when handling the potential melodrama of the material." Staci Layne Wilson of AtHomeInHollywood.com stated that the film is "presented through a prism of womanly wantonness juxtaposed with a mother's pain and fear." Joe McGovern of Entertainment Weekly complimented Nicole Kidman, saying "her best performances have often been as grieving moms (Dead Calm, The Others, Rabbit Hole) and here she provides the flaccid movie's sole flash of daring and unpredictability."

Richard Roeper of the Chicago Sun-Times gave a negative review, saying the film "runs out of gas, leaving us with a couple of final "Forget You" (shall we say) moments. Thanks. Thanks for nothing."

=== Accolades ===
Award	Category	Subject	Result
AFCA Awards	Best Actress	Nicole Kidman	Nominated
AFCA Awards	Best Cinematography	P.J. Dillon	Nominated
FCCA Awards	Best Actress	Nicole Kidman	Nominated
FCCA Awards	Best Supporting Actor	Hugo Weaving	Nominated
Sundance Film Festival	Grand Jury Prize	Kim Farrant	Nominated
Sydney Film Festival	Sydney Film Prize for Best Film	Kim Farrant	Nominated
