= Samantha Massell =

American actress

- Born: January 15, 1990 (age 36); New York, NY, USA
- Education: University of Michigan
- Occupation: Actress
- Website: samanthamassell.com

Samantha Massell (born January 15, 1990) is a New York-based American actress and singer notable for playing Hodel in the 2015 Broadway revival of Fiddler on the Roof. She has received positive reviews of her singing and acting performance. Her genre is pop.

== Early life ==
Massell attended Hunter College High School (where she interned for Lin-Manuel Miranda) and the University of Michigan, where she studied musical theater and English, and graduated Phi Beta Kappa.

== Career ==
She made her Broadway debut at age 12 in La Bohème. She originated the role of Florika in Disney's The Hunchback of Notre Dame and performed in the cast album.

She played Rapunzel in the 2015 revival of Into the Woods at The Muny.

She won the role of Hodel in a 2015 revival of the classic Broadway show Fiddler on the Roof.

In 2022, she featured in a recurring capacity in the final season of The CW's Dynasty as Stacey Moore.
