= Maddison Brown =

Australian actress

- Born: Maddison Amy Brown; 23 April 1997 (age 29); Melbourne, Australia
- Occupations: Actress; model
- Years active: 2004–present
- Agent: Chic Model Management
- Height: 1.77 m (5 ft 9 1/2 in)
- Spouse: Simon Mead (m. 2026)

Maddison Amy Brown (born 23 April 1997) is an Australian actress and model. She began her acting career with a role when she was seven years old, followed by appearances in Strangerland and The Kettering Incident. She is known for her role as Kirby Anders in the CW prime time soap opera Dynasty. After returning to Australia in 2024, Brown joined the main cast of soap opera Home and Away as Jo Langham.

== Early life ==
Brown has two older sisters and her sister Allyson played basketball for Australia. At the age of 5, Brown began acting and then started modeling at age 12. When Brown was 16, she left high school and Australia to pursue a modeling career in New York City. Her parents came with her for the first few trips, but then she was on her own.

== Career ==
=== Acting ===
At the age of seven, Brown made her acting debut in the 2004 television movie Go Big starring Justine Clarke. Speaking to Wonderland Magazine in 2015, Brown stated that acting as a child helped her deal with rejection which made her first few years as a model easier.

Soon after moving to New York, Brown was cast as Lily, the daughter of Nicole Kidman and Joseph Fiennes' characters in the 2015 drama film Strangerland. She described the experience as "wonderful" and "career-altering".

In 2016, Brown co-starred in the Australian drama series The Kettering Incident, played the younger version of Elizabeth Debicki's character.

In 2018, she joined the cast of The CW primetime soap opera Dynasty playing the role of Kirby Anders. The show was filmed in Atlanta and it took Brown some time to adjust due to homesickness.

Brown stars as Dani in Kelsey Taylor's feature film debut To Kill A Wolf, a modern adaptation of the Little Red Riding Hood story.

After returning home to Australia, Brown joined the main cast of Australian soap opera Home and Away as Jo Langham. She made her first appearance on 9 June 2025.

=== Modelling and skincare business ===
Some of the brands Brown has modelled for are Calvin Klein, Miu Miu, Jason Wu and Jasper Conran. Brown is an ambassador for Pantene and Longines. She is also the first brand ambassador for Pandora in Australia and New Zealand.

Brown founded the skincare and sunscreen brand Outside Beauty & Skincare with her sister Allyson Popovic in January 2023. They were inspired to create a sunscreen after the death of their father's best friend from melanoma. Outside Beauty & Skincare has become one of Australia's most popular SPF beauty brands. At the beginning of the 2025 Australian summer, the SPF50+ Lip to Cheek balm became a best seller, with one selling every four seconds. In October 2024, Outside Beauty & Skincare was picked up by fashion brand DISSH, and it launched on Adore Beauty two months later.

== Personal life ==
Brown married her partner, New Zealand actor Simon Mead in Queenstown, New Zealand in July 2026.

Speaking to Wendy Syfret of i-D in 2014, Brown said that she had trouble connecting to people her own age because she had lived on her own overseas and had been working for so long. Despite missing out on the Australian high school rights of passage such as the school formal and schoolies week, Brown stated she did not mind too much because she is not into partying or drinking.

Brown resided in the United States until October 2024. She lived in Atlanta while working on Dynasty and later West Hollywood.

When speaking to Rachelle Unreich of Harper's Bazaar Australia in 2020 about how women are perceived in Hollywood, Brown stated "Women still definitely have to be ten times nicer and work ten times harder to be given the same opportunities as men in Hollywood. And you often hear about women being labelled as divas or difficult to work with, but you hear that far less about the men. That's because we, as a society, are more ready to label women as difficult".

In April 2024, Brown spoke up on her TikTok about having experienced an hostile work environment created by one of her male co-stars, who allegedly was inappropriate to her during sex scenes, scared her and was later arrested for domestic battery.

== Filmography ==
Year	Title	Role	Notes
2004	Go Big	Young Gina	Television film
2015	Strangerland	Lily Parker	Film
2016	The Kettering Incident	Young Anna Macy	Recurring role
2018–2022	Dynasty	Kirby Anders	Main role (season 2–5)
2024	To Kill a Wolf	Dani	Film
2025–	Home and Away	Jo Langham	Main cast
