= Dynasty season 5 =

Dynasty season 5 may refer to:

- Dynasty (1981 TV series) season 5
- Dynasty (2017 TV series) season 5
