= Dynasty season 4 =

Dynasty season 4 may refer to:

- Dynasty (1981 TV series) season 4
- Dynasty (2017 TV series) season 4
