= Dominique Deveraux =

- Dynasty character
- Diahann Carroll as Dominique Deveraux
- Portrayed by: Diahann Carroll
- Duration: 1984–1987
- First appearance: "New Lady in Town"
- Last appearance: "Shadow Play"
- Created by: Richard and Esther Shapiro
- Spin-off appearances: The Colbys (1985–1986)
In-universe information
- Other names: Millie Cox (birth name)
- Occupation: Businesswoman; Recording artist
- Parents: Tom Carrington; Laura Matthews Cox
- Half-brothers: Blake Carrington; Ben Carrington
- Spouse: Brady Lloyd
- Children: Jackie Deveraux
- Aunts and uncles: Charles Matthews; Jane Matthews; Bessie
- Nieces and nephews: Adam Carrington; Fallon Carrington; Steven Carrington; Amanda Carrington; Krystina Carrington; Leslie Carrington

Dominique Deveraux is a fictional character on the ABC prime time soap opera Dynasty and its spin-off, The Colbys. Portrayed by Diahann Carroll from 1984 to 1987, the character is the surprise half-sister of millionaire Blake Carrington (John Forsythe). Dominique was written out of the series at the end of its seventh season, and did not return for the 1991 miniseries Dynasty: The Reunion.

In The CW's Dynasty reboot, Dominique is played by Michael Michele and is the mother of Jeff Colby (Sam Adegoke) and Monica Colby (Wakeema Hollis) as well as Blake's half-sister.

== Original series ==
=== Development ===
With Dynasty in its fourth season, Diahann Carroll saw the success of prime time soap operas, and noted that while they had covered many issues like rape and homosexuality, they had yet to tackle racial integration. She said at the time, "I want to be the first black bitch on television." Carroll had her manager reach out to Dynasty producer Aaron Spelling, but there had been no response before she and Spelling ran into each other soon after. Barbra Streisand had asked Carroll to sing a song from Yentl at the Golden Globes ceremony, and afterwards Carroll and Spelling found themselves at the same nightclub. He said, "When Diahann came in, [Dynasty co-creator] Esther Shapiro and I looked at her, looked at each other and said, 'My God, she is Dynasty.'" Carroll told Shapiro that night, "If it's not me let it be someone, because it's time." Spelling said, "We virtually closed the deal that night while having a drink at the bar." Dominique was introduced as a wealthy mystery woman who believed herself to be a Carrington, and in season five she is revealed to be Blake's half-sister.

Joining Dynasty made Carroll the only Black actress with a continuing role on a nighttime serial at that time, and Dominique the first prominently-featured African-American character on a prime time soap opera. Carroll said, "I certainly wasn't researching the number of Blacks on TV, but how could you fail to see they're not there?" Appearing in the final two episodes of the fourth season, Carroll's estimated salary was $35,000 an episode, and she was contracted for at least 17 of season five's 29 shows. Shapiro said, "We wanted a part where a Black [person] could be on the same social and economic level as the other characters. The one thing we wouldn't do is put on a Black woman as a victim." She added, "Our intention is to play the characters in 1984 with an emphasis on character, not color."

From the beginning, Dominique was intended as a foil for Alexis Colby, the villainess played by Joan Collins. Shapiro said, "Dominique is not out to outbitch Alexis per se." Collins said, "I think it is wonderful to have another fabulous 'over 40' in prime time. We have had a couple of bitch-to-bitch scenes which have been very good. And of course, no one knows better than I that in playing a bitch you don't have to be one." Carroll commented, "Joan and I are close enough in age and experience to realize that this is great for all of us. In the final analysis we will be good for each other." Willis Edwards, president of the Beverly Hills/Hollywood chapter of the NAACP, said of Carroll's casting, "This is a major thing as far as we're concerned. We've been fighting for something like this for years." Linda Evans, who played Krystle Carrington, said at the time, "I don't think the impact of her coming on the show will affect only Blacks. I think it will be great for all the people who see her."

=== Characterization ===
While pursuing a role on one of the nighttime soaps, Carroll said "I want to be wealthy and ruthless". She said in 2011 that Dynasty producer Elaine Rich "liked the idea of [Dominique] being a bitch", and Carroll said to her, "I think the most important thing for us to remember is write for a white male, and you'll have it. We'll have the character. Don't try to write for what you think I am, write for a white man who wants to be wealthy and powerful. And that's the way we found Dominique Deveraux."

In a 1984 interview, Carroll said "I've never played a role quite this unlikeable. And I like that. I like that very much because I think very often, particularly minorities, it's almost required of them that they are nice people, and I don't want to play a nice person."

=== Appearances ===
Carroll originated the role of singer/businesswoman Dominique Deveraux in the 1984 episode "New Lady in Town". She appeared in 71 episodes of Dynasty, and seven episodes of The Colbys. The character last appeared in the 1987 Dynasty season seven finale "Shadow Play".

To circumvent any chance the storyline would leak to the press, a number of scenes were filmed to introduce Dominique, including alternative lines revealing that she was the mother of Kirby Anders (Kathleen Beller) or the ex-wife of Alexis' former husband, Cecil Colby (Lloyd Bochner). Carroll was repeatedly featured rehearsing and/or performing songs in several episodes of both series.

=== Storylines ===
==== Season four ====
Successful and wealthy chanteuse Dominique Deveraux arrives in Denver in "New Lady in Town" (1984) with a flourish, asking Fallon Carrington Colby (Pamela Sue Martin) questions about her mother, Alexis Colby (Joan Collins). In the next episode, the fourth season finale, Dominique wonders, "Won't it just knock their socks off when they find out I'm a Carrington?"

==== Season five ====
Dominique's husband Brady Lloyd (Billy Dee Williams) arrives in Denver in the September 26, 1984 season premiere episode, "Disappearance." He asks why Dominique is performing at La Mirage. Brady and Dominique fight when she will not tell him why she is choosing to remain in Denver. Dominique's hostility toward oil tycoon Blake Carrington (John Forsythe) is noticed by Blake's wife Krystle (Linda Evans).

Following Fallon's memorial service in "The Rescue", Dominique makes the shocking claim that she is the daughter of Blake's father Tom Carrington (Harry Andrews) and his longtime mistress, Laura Matthews, and offers proof (a letter found in an old trunk left in the care of Laura's sister Bessie), therefore making her Blake's half-sister. A financially strapped Blake makes a business deal with the very wealthy Dominique: forty percent of Denver-Carrington in exchange for $70 million. This subsequently makes Dominique an enemy of Alexis, who has been scheming to destroy her ex-husband Blake. When Brady learns the truth, he is furious that Dominique did not confide in him earlier.

As Blake's business partner, Dominique travels to Istanbul to meet with the shady Rashid Ahmed in order to help Blake obtain a confession from him. Despite this assistance, in episode 100, Blake tells Dominique that Tom denies that he is her father. Furious, Dominique instigates a lawsuit against Blake for misappropriation of company funds after Blake uses some of the money she invested in Denver-Carrington to prevent losing his mansion. However, episode 102, "The Will", Dominique and Blake visit their father Tom on his deathbed in Sumatra; Alexis, a favorite of Tom's, follows them. Tom meets his illegitimate daughter Dominique for the first time, and she convinces him to accept her. Tom dies, but not before including Dominique in his will, as well as making her the executor, which further infuriates Alexis (who is also a beneficiary). In episode 103, "The Treasure", Blake and Dominique discuss the matter between them and Blake finally acknowledges her as his half-sister. Dominique, in a show of gratitude, tells Blake that she has dropped her lawsuit against him. Later on, Blake summons Alexis to his office and tells her that if she persists in trying to break Tom's will, he will put his support firmly behind Dominique. Furthermore, he reiterates the fact that she is now family and that he will fight to the death for her. Alexis concedes to Blake's demands, but tells him she will find a way to destroy Dominique regardless. Later that evening at the Carrington mansion, Blake holds a dinner gathering to formally welcome Dominique into the family. Adam goes out of his way to welcome her as well and Dominique is overcome with emotion. Later on, Amanda (Catherine Oxenberg) tells her mother Alexis about the gathering and that she is proud to have Dominique as her new aunt, much to Alexis's annoyance. Alexis then places a call to one of her associates and orders him to find out everything he can about Dominique.

In episode 108, Dominique learns that Brady has filed for divorce and that Alexis is attempting to take over her company, Deveraux Group, Inc., after which she collapses. At the hospital Dominique learns that she needs heart surgery. She pulls through her illness and becomes closer to Blake and Krystle. Although the divorce goes through, Brady refuses to sell his shares in Deveraux Group, Inc. to Alexis, foiling the takeover. Noticing that famed photojournalist Lady Ashley Mitchell (Ali MacGraw) appears to have designs on Blake, she warns Ashley to keep away and advises Krystle to watch out.

Dominique is among the family guests invited to Moldavia to celebrate the wedding of her niece, Amanda, to Prince Michael (Michael Praed), where a military coup takes place and insurgents take over the chapel and gun down the entire wedding party.

==== Season six (Dynasty) / Season one (The Colbys) ====
Dominique survives the wedding massacre, and rejects an offer by the rebel leader to remain in Moldavia to "entertain the troops and improve morale". Back in Denver, Dominique works with Blake on a pipeline deal with Jason Colby (Charlton Heston). She encounters Jonathan Lake (Calvin Lockhart), a state department employee, who reminds Dominique that they met years ago in Paris. Romance seems to be blossoming between the pair, but then a man from her past returns: Garrett Boydston (Ken Howard), Jason Colby's lawyer. Garrett tries to rekindle their romance, but Dominique is resistant. Years earlier, Dominique and Garrett had an affair. At the time, Garrett claimed that he was married and refused to leave his wife. Dominique is torn between the two men until she learns that Jonathan has aligned himself with Bart Fallmont (Kevin Conroy), a politician who is fighting the pipeline project.

Dominique travels frequently to Los Angeles, and hires Monica Colby (Tracy Scoggins) to help run her L.A.-based record company. While there, she continues to see Garrett. He cannot understand her reluctance to resume their relationship.

In episode 134, Dominique's daughter, Jackie (Troy Beyer) visits her mother and asks to remain in Denver instead of returning to finishing school in Lausanne, Switzerland. In episode 136, Garrett meets Jackie and is immediately convinced that he is her father. Garrett presses Dominique but she continues to deny that he is Jackie's father. Jackie, who would like to see her mother married and happy, also wonders about the true nature of their relationship. In episode 143, Jackie runs away when she learns that her father is listed as "unknown" on her birth certificate. Alexis encounters Jackie and manipulates the girl into telling her troubles. Dominique finally admits to Garrett that he is indeed Jackie's father. Jackie returns home in episode 145 and finally learns that Garrett is her father.

In episode 146, Dominique and Garrett decide to marry. In the season finale, at their engagement party Alexis reveals that Garrett was never married before. He lied in order to avoid a long-term relationship. Dominique slaps Alexis and orders her to leave. She confronts Garrett with the story who admits that he lied so many years ago. Stunned, Dominique breaks off the engagement. Her guests continue to celebrate, unaware that the wedding is cancelled — or that a fire is raging in other parts of the hotel.

==== Season seven (Dynasty) / Season two (The Colbys) ====
During the fire, Dominique panics when she cannot find Jackie. Dex Dexter (Michael Nader) manages to rescue Jackie, but she is badly burned. Jackie provides eyewitness testimony to the cause of the fire, before leaving Denver for state-of-the-art burn treatment.

During this time, Dominique helps Blake to fight Alexis, who has taken over Blake's company with the assistance of their estranged brother, Ben Carrington (Christopher Cazenove). She also attempts to revive her singing career. When a bad review appears in Alexis's newspaper, Dominique goes to confront her in episode 160 and a cat fight ensues.

In episode 154, Dominique meets geologist Nick Kimball (Richard Lawson), who romantically pursues her. Dominique resists him at first, but by episode 158 she gives in to his advances and they share a passionate night together. In episode 163, Nick saves Dominique from two thugs who were sent by businessman Gary Tilden to "rough her up" after she rejected a business deal from Tilden. But Dominique is still restrained about their relationship, and draws closer to Alexis's ex-husband Dex. Nick returns in episode 173 to whisk Dominique off for a romantic weekend in San Francisco, where he proposes. While Dominique contemplates marrying Nick, Jackie returns to Denver to tell her mother that Garrett is still in love with her. In episode 175, Jackie asks Nick to break it off with Dominique. When Dominique states that she will not get back together with Garrett, a defeated Jackie leaves Denver again. In episode 176, the season finale, Dominique and Nick attend the wedding of her nephew, Adam (Gordon Thomson). After the ceremony, Dominique accepts his proposal and the two leave Denver.

==== Season nine ====
Though not physically seen after season seven, Dominique (having revived her singing career touring Europe) is mentioned in season nine as Blake investigates the murder of Roger Grimes. Blake visits Dominique's uncle Charles Matthews, brother to her mother Laura and Aunt Bessie. Charles and his wife Jane later provide Blake with some of his father's belongings, left with them by Laura and then Bessie for safekeeping.

== Reboot ==
Dominique Deveraux
- Dynasty character
- Michael Michele as Dominique Deveraux
- Portrayed by: Michael Michele
- Duration: 2019–2022
- First appearance: "New Lady in Town"
- Last appearance: "Catch 22"
- Created by: Sallie Patrick; Richard and Esther Shapiro
In-universe information
- Other names: Millie Cox (birth name)
- Occupation: Businesswoman; Talent manager Television personality Fashion designer
- Father: Thomas Carrington
- Mother: Lo Cox
- Half-brothers: Blake Carrington; Ben Carrington
- Spouse: Cesil Colby; Brady Lloyd
- Children: Jeff Colby; Monica Colby
- Stepchildren: Vanessa Deveraux
- Nieces and nephews: Adam Carrington; Steven Carrington; Fallon Carrington; Amanda Carrington; Juliette Carrington

=== Development ===
A Dynasty reboot premiered on The CW on October 11, 2017. A May 2018 press release teased that the show would introduce Blake's half-sister Dominique Deveraux, Jeff and Monica Colby's mother, in season two. Executive producer Sallie Patrick said of introducing Dominique:

I look forward to doing that later this season, I hope. She's fantastic. She's a great character and she's a great foe for Alexis, but it's also interesting to me to bring in Monica and Jeff's mother. We've seen the Carringtons and while they're completely screwed up, they do have each other, more or less, and to see what's been missing from the Colbys and who that woman is, and how her arrival changes their characters will be really interesting.

On March 22, 2019, it was announced that Michael Michele had been cast to play Dominique for later in the second season of Dynasty. On October 11, 2019, it was confirmed that Michele had been promoted to series regular for the third season. This came after the fact that the actress had previously revealed her promotion via an Instagram comment back in July. Ahead of the third season's premiere, executive producer Josh Reims stated that Dominique would replace Alexis Carrington (previously played by Nicollette Sheridan, who had not yet been recast) as the show's new primary troublemaker, playing both sides in the Colby and Carringtons’ war. Reims also confirmed that Dominique's secret family "[would] show up at some point."

Ahead of the season four premiere, Elaine Hendrix spoke about her off-screen friendship with Michele and their onscreen rivalry as Dominique and Alexis, "I don't mean to draw any direct parallels, because we're obviously so different, but it will probably be the closest to the original [dynamic] between Joan Collins and Diahann Carroll."

=== Characterization ===
After the season three premiere, Justin Carreiro of The Young Folks wrote, "Dominique won't let anything get in her way, including her own children [...] She felt right at home walking into these people's lives ready to ruin their day."

=== Storylines ===
==== Season one ====
In the 2018 season one episode "Trashy Little Tramp", Jeff and Monica's grandmother (L. Scott Caldwell) confesses that their mother, Millie, was fathered by Thomas Carrington (Bill Smitrovich), making her Blake's sister.

==== Season two ====
Jeff (Sam Adegoke) leaves a message for his mother in the season two episode "A Champagne Mood", and invites her to Atlanta for a reunion in "The Sight of You". Monica (Wakeema Hollis), still furious over their mother's abandonment, calls Dominique and threatens a confrontation if she gets on the plane Jeff sent. Jeff is dejected when their mother does not come, or even call.

In "New Lady in Town", Dominique reappears as Jeff recovers at home. She and Monica clash over Dominique's abandonment, and though Dominique is apologetic, she asserts that Jeff and Monica were better off being raised by their grandmother. Dominique confesses that she has been lying about having a successful career, and Jeff writes his mother a check for $1 million as a trap to see if she only came back for money. Jeff and Monica catch Dominique trying to leave, but she has thrown the check in the trash. Dominique takes a secret phone call, revealing that she has been manipulating Jeff and Monica, and that she has other children in New York. In "Thicker Than Money", Dominique visits Blake (Grant Show), who has been paying her for years to keep secret the fact that she is his half-sister. The payments have recently stopped, and Dominique wants what she is owed. Blake says she can have her money when she gets Jeff off his back. Jeff figures out that Adam (Sam Underwood) poisoned him, and enlists Dominique to help destroy Blake and Adam. In "Deception, Jealousy, and Lies" Jeff and Dominique stage a crime scene with Jeff's blood and Adam's cufflink to make it look like Adam murdered Jeff, who leaves the country. Dominique, however, removes the cufflink and calls Blake to confirm that his payments to her will resume now that Jeff is out of the way.

==== Season three ====
In "Guilt Trip to Alaska", Dominique uses the press surrounding Jeff's disappearance and the Carrington Foundation Fundraiser as her reintroduction to Atlanta society, clashing with Cristal (Daniella Alonso) to ascend the Carrington dynasty. In "Wild Ghost Chase", Monica grows impatient with the pacing of Jeff's investigation and both she and a recently returned Jeff discover Dominique sabotaged their plan for Blake. Feeling betrayed, Jeff kicks Dominique out of his home. Dominique works to earn Jeff and Monica's forgiveness in "Something Desperate", agreeing to help sabotage Blake's winery. She initially spoils the wine, but later takes credit for a gas explosion that blinds Adam. In "Mother? I'm at La Mirage", an impatient Vanessa (Jade Payton) arrives in Atlanta to pressure her stepmother to speed up their plan to achieve Vanessa fame and fortune. Dominique uses the re-opening of the hotel La Mirage as a time to bond with Jeff as well as get Vanessa recognition as a performer, giving Ashanti food poisoning so that Vanessa can sing in her place. Jeff confesses his terminal illness to Dominique. In "A Used Up Memory", Dominique works to get Vanessa signed to Fallon (Elizabeth Gillies) and Monica's record label, but Vanessa's new relationship with Michael Culhane (Robert Christopher Riley) provides new obstacles. In "Shoot from the Hip", Vanessa reveals to Monica that they are stepsisters at Thanksgiving dinner. This revelation puts a strain on Dominique's relationships with her children in "The Sensational Blake Carrington Trial", and Monica and Vanessa leave for New York. Dominique is stunned to see Alexis Carrington (Elaine Hendrix) return to testify at Blake's trial, now married to Jeff.

Dominique spars with Alexis over the latter's new alliance with Jeff in "The Caviar, I Trust, Is Not Burned", but she leaves for New York after accepting temporary defeat. Dominique returns in "Battle Lines" where she encounters Michael at a bar and gets him drunk in order to record them have sex. Michael regrets this once Vanessa returns and begs for Dominique to keep their one night stand a secret. In exchange for assisting Blake, Dominique is invited to live in the manor. In "You See Most Things in Terms of Black & White", Dominique pitches a reality show about her and Vanessa, House of Deveraux, set in the manor, and she blackmails Cristal to allow Vanessa to move into the manor in "That Wicked Stepmother". Dominique secures a deal for her reality show to be produced by ramping up publicity over the scandal surrounding her leaked sex tape with Michael. In "Up a Tree", Dominique and Vanessa set aside their differences to manipulate Michael into joining House of Deveraux, but Michael is soon made aware of their deceptions. In "Robin Hood Rescues", the three get together to discuss deals for a second season of House of Deveraux, but Michael plays off Dominique's ego to get the show canceled with a faux offer for a better deal. Dominique and Vanessa learn that Michael played them, and Vanessa fires Dominique as her manager.

==== Season four ====
In "That Unfortunate Dinner", Dominique visits her mother (Roxzane Mims) who reveals that Thomas Carrington left her a key to a safety deposit box. Inside the deposit box contains the deed to the mineral rights beneath the Carringtons' property, as revealed in "Vows Are Still Sacred". With Alexis taking ownership of the manor, she and Dominique form an alliance, using Jeff to fund the excavation. Jeff calls off the partnership in "The Aftermath" due to Dominique's involvement, but the war continues into "Everybody Loves the Carringtons" where Jeff confronts Dominique about her obsession with the Carringtons and siding with Alexis. Dominique commits to rebuilding her relationships with Jeff and Monica in "New Hopes, New Beginnings" following the sudden death of her mother. Blake has a change of heart regarding Dominique's status as a Carrington in "The Birthday Party", so he confesses that there are no diamonds beneath the Carringtons' property. The two form an alliance to get the manor back from Alexis. They succeed in "Your Sick and Self-Serving Vendetta", and Dominique finally makes peace with her father's rejection. Blake gives Dominique the loft which she converts into a studio to honor her mother's dreams of designing fashion. Alexis confronts Dominique for her betrayal, but a fight breaks out and causes the mines to cave in on top of them. While trapped in "Equal Justice for the Rich", Dominique and Alexis bond over their regrets with their children and share their biggest secrets, Dominique still being legally married to her second husband, Brady Lloyd. Jeff rescues them and is finally open to rebuilding a relationship with his mother.

In "Everything but Facing Reality", Jeff helps fund Dominique's fashion line after she passes on a lucrative deal in order to produce affordable clothing, which she showcases on the red carpet in "But I Don't Need Therapy". In "She Lives in a Showplace Penthouse", Dominique designs Cristal a gown for an upcoming gala and the two finally bond. Fallon seeks to quell competing offers for Dominique's line in "The British Are Coming" to secure Dominique for her shopping network, and Dominique goes into business with Fallon to keep her company in the family. In "A Good Marriage in Every Sense", Blake seeks out Dominique's help to secure the black community's vote for his senatorial campaign. Dominique brokers a deal with Jeff and Michael to assist. Dominique's husband, Brady Lloyd (Randy J. Goodwin), resurfaces in "Everything Looks Wonderful, Joseph". He seeks to reconcile and explains that he left her in order to protect her from his creditors. Jeff is concerned that Brady is after Dominique's money, as he would be entitled to half of her company if he learns that they are still legally married. In "Affairs of State and Affairs of the Heart", Dominique comes clean to Brady when Alexis tries to blackmail her for 20% of Dom-Mystique. In actuality, Brady is working with Alexis. Dominique notices a decline in Jeff's health as he begins to act erratically, and his madness grows out of control in "Filled with Manipulations and Deceptions" once he is convinced that Brady is a spy. Jeff handcuffs Dominique so that she cannot stop him from attempting to kill Brady, but Michael frees her before racing to stop Jeff.

==== Season five ====
Dominique is relieved when Jeff goes into recovery in "Let's Start Over Again", but he exposes Brady's treachery once cognizant. Dominique finalizes her divorce from Brady in "That Holiday Spirit" after she and Jeff save him from her vengeful creditors, and she revels in Alexis' failure. In "Go Catch Your Horse", Dominique seeks to take Dom-Mystique international and eyes a contract to redesign the uniforms for NordicStar Airlines. Kirby (Maddison Brown) becomes the muse of her next fashion line, and Dominique reintroduces her to the runway. Dominique clashes with Jeff over the rights to her designs in "A Little Fun Wouldn't Hurt" as Jeff limits her creative control while acting as interim CEO of Fallon Unlimited. A loophole grants Dominique the right to create and sell menswear and accessories outside of her contract with FSN. In "Mind Your Own Business", Fallon struggles to mediate Dominique's conflict with Alexis over a prime time slot on her shopping network. The two feature in a televised catfight, and Fallon leverages the spectacle's high ratings to get them to work together. Dominique is presented with an opportunity in "I'll Settle for a Prayer" to design costumes for the film adaptation of The Biggest Payday, and Michael recognizes how far she has come since their initial sex scandal.

In "Vicious Vendetta", Dominique uses Alexis' wedding to Dex Dexter (Pej Vahdat) as an opportunity to network, as she seeks to show off her portfolio to Samir Dexter (David Diaan), who sits on the board of NordicStar. Alexis sabotages Dominique's plan and the two sparring results in the portfolio being lost over the balcony of Alexis' penthouse. Ben Carrington (Brett Tucker) makes a dramatic return to the Carringtons' lives, and Dominique finds herself in the middle of her brothers' feud in "Ben". She initially sides with Ben upon learning that Blake cost her mother her job at Carrington Atlantic years prior, but she is left feeling betrayed by Ben in "My Family, My Blood" when he uses her to sabotage Blake. Dominique shows up to support Cristal and promote her designs during Blake and Ben's bench trial in "There's No One Around to Watch You Drown", and she later receives confirmation that she won the NordicStar contest. Dominique is exposed to the dark side of fame in "But a Drug Scandal?" and is assigned a hunky bodyguard, Kevin, (Henry Simmons) after receiving anonymous threats. Despite her stalker being exposed, Dominique is fear-stricken after her loft is broken into. Dominique grows closer with her bodyguard in "More Power to Her", and the two consummate their relationship once it is determined that Dominique is no longer in danger. Dominique attends Michael's wedding in "Catch 22", revealed to be in a committed relationship with Kevin and set to open her first clothing store on Bleecker Street.

=== Reception ===
Reed Gaudens of Hidden Remote praised Michele for her debut as Dominique and wrote, "That's some exquisite casting, and they better keep her around through next season." However, critics were notably uninterested in Dominique's motive to take control of the Carrington dynasty. TV Fanatic's Lizzy Buczak wrote that it's "lame" and "her execution of the character pales in comparison to the rest of the cast." Contrary, Justin Carreiro of The Young Folks described Dominique as "a breath of fresh air," adding that, "Now that Alexis is gone, we needed another glamorous villain who is all about status, wealth, and seizing the Carrington glory." Carreiro was less critical of Dominique's general motive but agreed "her goal to get the news piece is a weak plan," arguing that, "If Dominique wants to get her status, she has to start thinking like a Carrington: go big or go home."

Interest in Dominique's storyline was revived upon the debut of Elaine Hendrix as the new incarnation of Alexis, many fans anticipating the feud between the two characters.
