= Dynasty (2017 TV series) season 5 =

Dynasty
- Season 5
- Promotional poster
- Starring: Elizabeth Gillies; Daniella Alonso; Elaine Hendrix; Rafael de La Fuente; Sam Underwood; Michael Michele; Robert Christopher Riley; Sam Adegoke; Maddison Brown; Adam Huber; Eliza Bennett; Grant Show
- No. of episodes: 22

Release
- Original network: The CW
- Original release: December 20, 2021 – September 16, 2022

Season chronology
- ← Previous; Season 4

The fifth and final season of Dynasty, an American television series based on the 1980s prime time soap opera of the same name, premiered in the United States on The CW on December 20, 2021. The series was renewed for a fifth season on February 3, 2021. It was announced in May 2022 that the fifth season of Dynasty would be its last.

Season five stars Elizabeth Gillies as Fallon Carrington, Grant Show as her father Blake Carrington, Daniella Alonso as Blake's wife Cristal, Sam Underwood as Fallon's brother Adam Carrington, and Eliza Bennett as her younger sister Amanda Carrington, with Robert Christopher Riley as Michael Culhane; Sam Adegoke as Jeff Colby; Rafael de la Fuente as Sam Jones; Adam Huber as Liam Ridley; Maddison Brown as Kirby Anders; Michael Michele as Dominique Deveraux; and Elaine Hendrix as Alexis Carrington Colby. Notable recurring characters include Geovanni Gopradi as Roberto "Beto" Flores; Rogelio T. Ramos as Daniel Ruiz; Pej Vahdat as Dex Dexter; and Brett Tucker as Ben Carrington. Alonso also plays the recurring role of Rita, and James Mackay returns as Steven Carrington.

== Cast and characters ==
=== Main ===
- Elizabeth Gillies as Fallon Carrington, an heiress and businesswoman, daughter of billionaire Blake Carrington and his first wife Alexis, and married to Liam
  - Hanna Ciubotaru portrays young Fallon
- Daniella Alonso as Cristal Jennings Carrington, Blake's third wife and the CEO of Flores Incorporado
  - Alonso was also given an end credits billing for playing Rita, a Cristal lookalike in league with Beto
- Elaine Hendrix as Alexis Carrington Colby Dexter, ex-wife of Blake and Jeff, new wife of Dex, mother of Adam, Steven, Fallon and Amanda
- Rafael de La Fuente as Samuel Josiah "Sammy Jo" Jones Carrington, Steven Carrington's ex-husband, owner of the La Mirage Hotel
- Sam Underwood as Adam Carrington, Blake and Alexis's eldest son, a doctor
- Michael Michele as Dominique Deveraux, Jeff's mother, Blake's half-sister, owner of fashion brand Dom-Mystique
- Robert Christopher Riley as Michael Culhane, former Carrington chauffeur, now co-owner of La Mirage with Sam
- Sam Adegoke as Jeff Colby, Dominique's son and Blake's nephew, a billionaire tech genius
- Maddison Brown as Kirby Anders, daughter of the late Carrington majordomo, Joseph Anders, a model
- Adam Huber as Liam Ridley, a writer married to Fallon
- Eliza Bennett as Amanda Carrington, Alexis's youngest daughter by Blake, a lawyer from the UK
- Grant Show as Blake Carrington, billionaire and the father of Adam, Fallon and Amanda by his first wife, Alexis
  - Jax Buresh portrays teenage Blake.

=== Recurring ===
- Geovanni Gopradi as Roberto "Beto" Flores, Cristal's vengeful brother
- Rogelio T. Ramos as Daniel Ruiz, a horse trainer who is Sam's biological father
- Pej Vahdat as Dex Dexter, a hedge fund manager who marries Alexis
- Cynthia Quiles as Charlie Jiménez, a modeling agent who reps and romances Kirby
- Felisha Terrell as Nina Fournier, an up-and-coming independent filmmaker
- Brett Tucker as Ben Carrington, Blake's estranged brother
  - Townsend Fallica portrays Ben as a boy
- Samantha Massell as Stacey Moore, a paleontologist who is Fallon and Liam's surrogate
- Grace Junot as Ellen, a board member of Fallon Unlimited

=== Guest ===
- Kara Royster as Eva, Fallon's incarcerated former assistant
- Randy J. Goodwin as Brady Lloyd, Dominique's ex-husband
- Arnetia Walker as Louella Culhane, Michael's mother
- Kate Kneeland as Betty, Fallon's new assistant
- Carson Fagerbakke as Patricia "Patty" De Vilbis, longtime nemesis of Fallon's from the equestrian circuit
- Bill Fagerbakke as Peter De Vilbis, Patty's oil baron father
- Daniela Lee as Jeanette, a Carrington maid
- Lara Silva as Luna, a terminally-ill friend of Jeff's
- Yvonna Pearson as Sasha Harris, a model friend of Kirby's
- Daphne Zuniga as Sonya Jackson, a college friend of Blake's
- Elena Tovar as Iris Machado, Sam's mother
- Scott Daniel Johnson as Richard Payne, CEO of Plenexia Pharmaceuticals and Jeff's foe
- Sharon Lawrence as Laura Van Kirk, Liam's rich, controlling mother
- Brianna Brown as Claudia Blaisdel, the parolee who killed Blake's second wife, Cristal/Celia
- Tetona Jackson as Frankie Chase, a singer Fallon wants to join her company
- David Diaan as Samir Dexter, Dex's father
- Angeria Paris VanMicheals as Herself
- Danny Nucci as Professor Kingston, Liam's mentor
- Walker Russell as Jasper, Kingston's unscrupulous nephew
- Carly Hughes as Geneva Abbott, the widow of Sam and Michael's late contractor Leo Abbott
- Shaun MacLean as Ronnie, a talkative bartender at La Mirage
- Charisma Carpenter as Heather, Fallon's former nanny with whom Blake had an affair
- Henry Simmons as Kevin, Dominique's bodyguard
- Amy Pietz as Mandy Von Dunkel, an Atlanta dilettante
- Matt Bennett as Cole, a bachelor who takes part in Fallon's auction
- Ashley B. Jones as Gemma, a sexy spy for Plenexia
- Lachlan Buchanan as Ryan, Sam's ex-boyfriend
- Kate Beahan as Florence Whitley, a British judge and Amanda's ex-girlfriend
- Natalie Karp as Mrs. Gunnerson, the Carrington cook
- James Mackay as Steven Carrington, Fallon's gay, environmentalist half-brother
  - Steve Spoon as young Steven
  - Dan Amboyer as Graham, a candidate to replace Anders as Carrington majordomo who is actually Steven in disguise

== Episodes ==
Dynasty season 5 episodes
No. overall	No. in season	Title	Directed by	Written by	Original release date	U.S. viewers (millions)
87	1	"Let's Start Over Again"	Michael A. Allowitz	Christopher Fife	December 20, 2021	0.38
Reports of Fallon's death are exaggerated. She is very much alive (surviving a through-and-through gunshot wound) and anxious to ditch the hospital to reverse her company's free-fall with Sam and Kirby's help. Jeff recovers in another ward but is cognizant enough to expose Brady's treachery to Dominique. Alexis is allowed caviar and pumps in prison but denied bail. Amanda starts to gather evidence that Adam (not her mother) murdered Dr. Larson. Blake manipulates the press (again). Beto sees possibilities in a trashy doppelgänger of Cristal. Fallon gets Liam to admit how angry he still is with her before she lapses into a coma from an undetected infection.
88	2	"That Holiday Spirit"	Kenny Leon	Aubrey Villalobos Karr	December 20, 2021	0.31
Liam rallies the family to have Christmas conversations with comatose Fallon. His are about forgiveness; Kirby tries to stir emotion; Blake confesses vulnerability; Sam and Culhane get hung up on words and holiday decor. Jeff sets up an FBI sting to free Brady of his mob debts, then Dominique parts with him for good. Adam scrambles to find an alibi for the night of the murder, barely keeping ahead of Amanda's investigation. Blake decides to quit the senate race. Dom visits Alexis in prison with bitter tidings. Fallon wavers at death's bright light, then wakes. Beto trains his new protege Rita how to behave like Cristal.
89	3	"How Did the Board Meeting Go?"	Pascal Verschooris	David M. Israel	March 11, 2022	0.25
The annual Carrington gala hosts a wealth of new partnerships; some desired, some forced. Blake teams with Cristal to coerce a deal for PPA's airfield before Beto kidnaps and replaces her with an impeccably coached Rita. Fallon is put on medical leave by her board so she installs Jeff as the company's CEO, using the break to reheat passion with Liam. Sam and Kirby try in vain to help Culhane find a soulmate. Amanda tracks footage from a drone that exonerates both her mother and Adam of Dr. Larson's (shockingly accidental) death. Alexis is released from prison in time to attend the gala where she makes Adam sign over his promising business, then connects with handsome investor Farnsworth "Dex" Dexter.
90	4	"Go Catch Your Horse"	Star Barry	Libby Wells	March 18, 2022	0.28
Jeff settles in as head of Fallon Unlimited while Kirby becomes the muse for Dominique's next fashion line. Fallon rediscovers a love of horses when Sam mentors her into a joining an equestrian foundation to find personal fulfillment. Unfortunately, this brings out a competitive streak as she bids for a prize mare against frenemy Patty De Vilbis. Culhane's animosity with film director Nina nearly derails Liam's shot to adapt his novel for the screen. Cristal remains Beto's hostage as her lookalike Rita cons Blake to surrender the Flores empire. Amanda's distrust of Dex gives Alexis second thoughts on her impetuous romance with him. Fallon's recent dream of starting a family is met with ambiguity by Liam.
91	5	"A Little Fun Wouldn't Hurt"	Andi Behring	Elaine Loh	March 25, 2022	0.20
Leisure is never easy for the Carringtons. Sam's dalliance with a shallow trendsetter tests his partnership with Culhane and new friendship with Daniel, a horse trainer staying at La Mirage. Family ties edge out business ones when Dominique and Jeff clash over an exclusivity clause in her Fallon Unlimited contract. Liam and Fallon hop from manor to manor in order to find the perfect spot to conceive a child. Blake refuses to transfer the rights for Flores Inc, which prompts Rita to consider poisoning him as she comes on to Adam. Daniel claims Sam is his son.
92	6	"Devoting All of Her Energy to Hate"	Brandi Bradburn	Liz Sczudlo	April 1, 2022	0.23
Fallon and Jeff combine tactics to regain Morell Green Energy when they expose greenwashing by its current owners, Patty and her oil baron father, Peter De Vilbis. Blake's suspicions spur him to find Beto's lair. He breaks up a fight between Cristal and Rita, deduces which is his true wife, has the imposter arrested, and closes down Beto with a con of his own. Sam chooses to accept Daniel after learning of his troubled past in Caracas. Amanda poses as Kirby's date to help her reconnect with a modeling agency. Culhane and Nina tangle once more securing a shoot date for Liam's film. Patty contacts a mystery accomplice with an aim on destroying Fallon.
93	7	"A Real Actress Could Do It"	Ayoka Chenzira	Bryce Schramm	April 8, 2022	0.28
Jealousy colors a new week at the manor. Cristal's post-traumatic stress surfaces when paired with Alexis at a seminar for women executives (the hot dog sale assigned to them deteriorates into a ketchup/mustard fight). A romantic triangle forms between Kirby, her female agent Charlie, and Amanda. Blake's fatherly position is threatened so he does a deep dive on Daniel to prove he is only after Sam's money. Jeff discovers company sabotage is responsible for a wetlands oil spill. Fallon has difficulty masking her corporate side when shadowed by an eco-sensitive actress that Liam and Culhane are pursuing for their film. Sam spies Daniel in pain, injecting himself with a syringe.
94	8	"The Only Thing That Counts Is Winning"	Heather Tom	Chris Erric Maddox	April 15, 2022	0.26
Bets are high at the Peachtree Stakes where Fallon's steed, Allegra (trained by Daniel), runs against Patty's. Dex pushes Alexis and Adam to see a therapist and address their strained issues. Kirby discourages Culhane from dating her colleague, Sasha, but he does anyway and learns both models are being bilked by Charlie. The death of Luna, a spirited friend Jeff met in recovery, inspires him to move past the Mars fiasco. Cristal suggests Amanda embrace being a Carrington and follow Blake's example in dealing with troubles at the hospital. After Allegra's victory, Daniel lets Sam know his drug use is for cancer. Fallon finds both glory in her win and humility to trust others.
95	9	"A Friendly Kiss Between Friends"	SM Main-Muñoz	Garrett Oakley	April 29, 2022	0.22
Blake feels his age until he and Cristal get an illicit proposal to swing with Sonya, a former Yale classmate, and her husband. They decline but are invigorated by the offer. Alexis, Adam, and Sam navigate numerous obstacles (lack of product, bad PR, and self doubt) while launching Alexam's face cream. Jeff resigns from Morell Green Energy to go after price-gauging pharmaceuticals. Fallon, stinging from her current infertility, tries to help him by extorting data from an unethical drug company. Amanda's failed attempt to rescue Kirby from a crooked modeling contract results in their first romantic kiss.
96	10	"Mind Your Own Business"	Heather Tom	Katrina Cabrera Ortega	May 6, 2022	0.21
Cameras start to roll on The Biggest Payday, but Liam (the writer) finds himself banned from the set until he bypasses Culhane (the producer) and Nina (the director) to accommodate the star, making himself invaluable. Daniel's chemotherapy is not successful so Sam and Blake convince him to spend his last days in Atlanta. Fallon juggles Alexis and Dominique's egos when both claim a prime time slot on her shopping network. One televised catfight later and she leverages the spectacle's high ratings to get them to work together. Jeff holds a shipment of herbal cosmetic ingredients hostage so his nemesis, Dr. Adam, will use his medical credentials help infiltrate Plenexia Pharmaceuticals.
97	11	"I'll Settle for a Prayer"	Brandi Bradburn	India Sage Wilson	May 13, 2022	0.20
Fallon and Liam jet to Idaho in search of Sam's guilt-ridden mother, Iris, to convince her to return to Atlanta. Her initial reluctance to leave her church causes the Ridleys to pose as a nympho nun and an imbued priest, then come to terms with their own religious differences. Jeff and Adam gain a begrudging respect for each other when they steal and post a price-inflated drug formula from Plenexia. Amanda moves into the manor after Blake and Cristal strategize to be supportive parents in contrast with Alexis's vindictiveness. Dominique designs costumes for The Biggest Payday as Culhane and Nina's bickering starts to turn to passion. Daniel passes away with his true love, Iris, and son, Sam, at his side.
98	12	"There's No Need to Panic"	Robin Givens	David M. Israel	May 20, 2022	0.21
Crisis triggers romance and heartache in the Carrington manor. PPA business trumps marriage when Cristal goes over Blake's head to strike a game-changing deal with Sonya. Amanda's heated battles with Adam at the hospital draw her and Kirby closer together at home. Liam realizes his film's storyline reflects buried history with Culhane and makes amends before production wraps. Home invaders force Alexis and Fallon to spend a night locked in a panic room where they level up about their insecurities as mother and daughter and how to face the future. When safe and free, Alexis accepts an engagement ring from Dex and Fallon reveals to Liam that she can never carry a baby due to scarring from her gunshot wound.
99	13	"Do You Always Talk to Turtles"	Andi Behring	Malcolm Boomer & Chava Friedberg	May 27, 2022	0.23
Fallon schemes to have Blake's airport go "Morell green" by unleashing environmentalists (and an endangered tortoise) on the property. Cristal shuts her down but offers a keen compromise that benefits all. Sam is convinced that Sasha is the wrong woman for Culhane and relies on tarot cards to prove it. Would-be parents Liam and Fallon opt to try surrogacy. Dominique asks Jeff to rethink his crusade against corrupt CEOs. Amanda and Kirby find some alone time when they stow away on a PPA jet. Liam's rich mother, Laura, swoops back into Atlanta. She guilts her son, taunts Fallon, and strong-arms Adam until an overdose of cosmetic injectables leaves her dead, impaled on a stiletto heel.
100	14	"Vicious Vendetta"	Pascal Verschooris	Josh Reims & Christopher Fife	June 3, 2022	0.23
Another family wedding stirs more chaos than bliss. The bride, Alexis, tries to smooth over her tarnished reputation with Dex's father, Samir, by inviting both exes (Blake and Jeff) to the ceremony. Fallon shuffles her search for the perfect surrogate and business negotiations between duties as Matron of Honor. Dominique crashes the reception to show off her portfolio. Blake, Cristal, and Sam rule out potential enemies among the guests including paroled Claudia Blaisdel, who slips by security with a coffee mug for Alexis. Adam's plot to break up Kirby and Amanda is thwarted when they announce their relationship during the champagne toast. Blake's hated brother, Ben, enters and takes a punch from his sibling as the party ends.
101	15	"Ben"	Brandon Lott	Bryce Schramm	June 24, 2022	0.25
Ben Carrington is a shrewd, dashing art dealer out to prove he did not cause his mother's death some twenty years prior (a notion Blake will not consider). Fallon gets so paranoid when her pregnant surrogate Stacey goes on an archaeology dig that she turns to Adam to help sabotage it. Dominique is swayed to hear Ben's agenda. Jeff enlists Amanda to track the owner of ColbyCo's lost holdings, but she withholds information after learning it is Blake. When Sam is not invited to "Lance Bash", he becomes an irrational diva tasking Culhane and Kirby to stage a last minute Gay Pride gala at the Sahara Club. Ben is foiled at pinning a Vermeer forgery on Blake, so he sues for half of the dynasty instead.
102	16	"My Family, My Blood"	Robbie Countryman	Elaine Loh	July 1, 2022	0.22
The Carrington women clash on how to obtain attorney files that can be used against Blake in the upcoming estate case (Fallon leans towards theft, Cristal to bargaining). Adam steps in for an ailing Alexis at her shopping network broadcast, but she mistakenly suspects he poisoned her to do so. Liam experiences writer’s block. Ben dupes Dominique to leak a fake legal strategy that misleads Blake. Culhane dives into an affair with Geneva Abbott, widow of the racketeer he and Sam electrocuted. Fallon sees underhanded methods won’t leave a positive legacy, so she chooses Cristal as a mentor and her unborn child's godmother. Alexis steals Kirby's incriminating dossier on the family and gives it to Ben.
103	17	"There's No One Around to Watch You Drown"	Grant Show	Liz Sczudlo	July 8, 2022	0.28
The bench trial for the dynasty centers on an alleged note Ben left for Blake on the night their mother drowned. Witnesses include Heather (Fallon and Steven’s hot nanny who was Blake’s mistress), Alexis (produces the note), Fallon (proves Blake never saw it), and Kirby (verifies it was hidden in Anders’s files). The will that disinherited Ben is upheld, though he is absolved by Judge Drexel of deliberate negligence. Jeff and Culhane aid Kirby in retrieving her diary, which she burns. Liam ghost-writes an essay for his mentor’s nephew. Dominique wins a contract to design airline uniforms. Guilt over Leo Abbott’s demise causes Culhane to part with Geneva. Ben rejects Blake's amends and vows reprisal. Fallon finds Adam and Stacey kissing.
104	18	"A Writer of Dubious Talent"	Heather Tom	Katrina Cabrera Ortega	August 5, 2022	0.24
Six months have passed. Liam struggles to meet the deadline on his book so he checks into La Mirage where he gains film noir nightmares but no new pages. Culhane and Nina resume their adversarial relationship at The Biggest Payday premiere until Dominique pushes them to realize they are actually in love. Jeff hacks into PPA’s mainframe to force Blake to sell back ColbyCo assets (which Cristal and Amanda arrange without Blake's approval). Adam's intense romance with Stacey warps him into risking her pregnancy so Fallon will help reinstate him at the hospital. Professor Kingston suddenly dies leaving behind a brilliant, unpublished manuscript that Liam considers claiming as his own work.
105	19	"But a Drug Scandal?"	Elizabeth Gillies	Aubrey Villalobos Karr	August 12, 2022	0.22
Fallon squares off against Atlanta snob Mandy Von Dunkel who opposes a racy bachelor auction that will benefit Heroic Hooves, an equestrian charity. Alexis and Dex argue over how to handle the FDA's investigation into Adam's dangerous injectables. Liam submits the novel he did not write to his publisher despite Sam's disapproval. Dominique is threatened by a stalker and assigned a hunky, overzealous bodyguard. Even with Culhane, Sam, and Liam up for bid, Fallon's event nearly fails until Jeff raises the ante and donations roll in, besting Mandy's browbeats. Blake fixes Adam's problem by switching drug samples, but Alexis is done with her son’s betrayals and turns him over to DEA agents.
106	20	"First Kidnapping and Now Theft"	Pat Santana	Chris Erric Maddox	September 2, 2022	0.18
Blake works to clear Adam's name, but Cristal grows concerned about the effects Adam's scandal will have on PPA and Flores. Alexis seeks to strengthen her connection with Fallon and Amanda, who see Alexis in a new light after they take a roadtrip to Charleston and see the house Alexis built for her children before Blake bribed a judge for sole custody. Sam reconnects with his ex, Ryan, and learns that La Mirage is used for an illegal sex-ring operation. Sam and Michael devise a plan to make the problem go away, and Sam and Ryan reunite. Jeff is hurt to discover Kirby kept quiet about Blake's acquisition of ColbyCo assets, and Amanda is upset that Kirby used her name to threaten a nurse. Meanwhile, Jeff's girlfriend, Gemma, is a double-agent for Plenexia, and Blake finally evicts Adam from the manor.
107	21	"More Power to Her"	Michael A. Allowitz	Libby Wells	September 9, 2022	0.17
As Fallon and Liam prepare for their baby shower, Fallon opens her first hydroelectric plant and discovers the head of her board, Ellen, seeks to make a coup for her company. Meanwhile, Liam's plagiarism results in being blackmailed by Jasper. Certain relationships hit strides; Dominique admits feelings for her bodyguard; Michael proposes to Nina, who accepts. Meanwhile, Sam and Ryan break up when Sam is unable to commit; Stacey discovers Adam put her pregnancy at risk; and Jeff learns that Gemma orchestrated the robbery at Dom's loft. At the shower, Stacey accidentally reveals that the baby will be a girl. Additionally, Blake deals with a crisis that involves a missing PPA aircraft which Dex was on; Kirby and Amanda's discussion about the future is interrupted by the arrival of Amanda's ex, Florence; and the new majordomo, Graham, kidnaps Adam to make him pay for all those he hurt.
108	22	"Catch 22"	Pascal Verschooris	Josh Reims & Garrett Oakley	September 16, 2022	0.19
As Stacey's delivery nears, the Carringtons and Colby's make difficult decisions about their futures. Fallon makes last ditch efforts to save her company. Liam grapples with his integrity as a writer. Florence offers Amanda a job in London, but Kirby is afraid to uproot her life. Jeff makes his servers public, fast-tracking ColbyCo's restoration. Sam struggles to come to terms with Culhane's move to Los Angeles. Blake and Alexis' rescue mission results in heartfelt reunions for Alexis with Dex and Blake with Cristal. A captive Adam learns that Graham is Steven, back for revenge, but Steven spares Adam's life and orders Adam to leave immediately. Then Steven reunites with Sam and Fallon before Stacey goes into labor. Fallon reveals her daughter Lauren Morell Carrington-Ridley to the family before Steven makes his re-entrance. Six months later, everyone gathers at the manor for Culhane's wedding. Fallon rebrands her company as "Carrington United" with Blake's approval. Liam is now a children's book author, has included a disclaimer by him in his mentor's book, and is taking care of Lauren. Kirby and Amanda agree to live in London together. Dominique and Alexis both open up stores on Bleecker Street. Jeff sets up ColbyCo's new headquarters in Nigeria as he advises Dominique and Alexis to combine their stores. Adam is working as a veterinarian in London under the alias of Dr. Kerwan. Steven and Sam are back together as Steven eyes taking over Fallon's foundation. Sam officiates Michael and Nina's ceremony and everyone gathers for a family photo.

== Production ==
=== Development ===
Ahead of the season four premiere on The CW, Dynasty was renewed for a fifth season on February 3, 2021. The CW President and CEO Mark Pedowitz stated in a press release, "Though we’re just a few weeks into the new season, we wanted to get a strategic head start on next season with these early renewals, which allows our production teams to start laying out story arcs and hiring staff, and at the same time, continues to provide us with a strong, stable schedule to build on for next season."

Season five consisted of 22 episodes. It was announced in May 2022 that the fifth season of Dynasty would be its last.

=== Casting ===
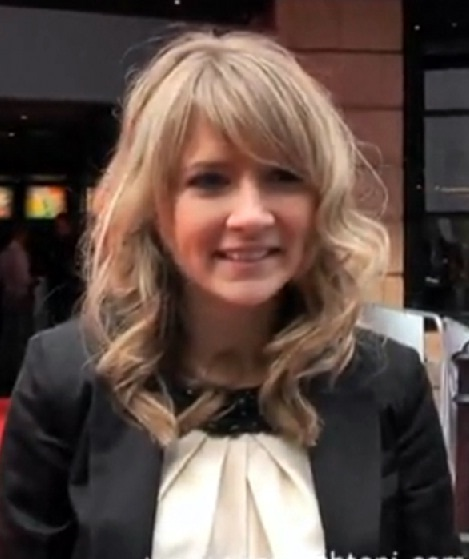
Eliza Bennett became a series regular in season five, portraying Amanda Carrington.

In August 2021, Eliza Bennett was cast as Amanda Carrington in a recurring role for season four, to become a series regular in season five. In January 2022, it was reported that Pej Vahdat had been cast as Dex Dexter for season five. In April 2022, Variety reported that Grant Show's former Melrose Place castmate Daphne Zuniga would appear on Dynasty as Sonya Jackson, a college friend of Blake's, debuting in the episode "A Friendly Kiss Between Friends". In May 2022, TVLine reported that Charisma Carpenter would guest star in the seventeenth episode as Fallon's former nanny, Heather.

=== Filming ===
Filming for the fifth season began on October 21, 2021, and concluded in August 2022.

== Broadcast ==
The fifth season premiered with two episodes on Monday, December 20, 2021, and then returned to Fridays on March 11, 2022.

== Reception ==
=== Ratings ===
Viewership and ratings per episode of Dynasty
No.	Title	Air date	Rating (18–49)	Viewers (millions)	DVR (18–49)	DVR viewers (millions)	Total (18–49)	Total viewers (millions)
1	"Let's Start Over Again"	December 20, 2021	0.1	0.38	TBD	TBD	TBD	TBD
2	"That Holiday Spirit"	December 20, 2021	0.1	0.31	TBD	TBD	TBD	TBD
3	"How Did The Board Meeting Go?"	March 11, 2022	0.1	0.25	0.1	0.17	0.1	0.42
4	"Go Catch Your Horse"	March 18, 2022	0.1	0.28	0.0	0.12	0.1	0.40
5	"A Little Fun Wouldn't Hurt"	March 25, 2022	0.0	0.20	0.0	0.16	0.1	0.36
6	"Devoting All of Her Energy to Hate"	April 1, 2022	0.0	0.23	TBD	TBD	TBD	TBD
7	"A Real Actress Could Do It"	April 8, 2022	0.0	0.28	TBD	TBD	TBD	TBD
8	"The Only Thing That Counts Is Winning"	April 15, 2022	0.0	0.26	TBD	TBD	TBD	TBD
9	"A Friendly Kiss Between Friends"	April 29, 2022	0.0	0.22	TBD	TBD	TBD	TBD
10	"Mind Your Own Business"	May 6, 2022	0.0	0.21	TBD	TBD	TBD	TBD
11	"I'll Settle for a Prayer"	May 13, 2022	0.0	0.20	TBD	TBD	TBD	TBD
12	"There's No Need to Panic"	May 20, 2022	0.0	0.21	TBD	TBD	TBD	TBD
13	"Do You Always Talk to Turtles"	May 27, 2022	0.0	0.23	TBD	TBD	TBD	TBD
14	"Vicious Vendetta"	June 3, 2022	0.0	0.23	TBD	TBD	TBD	TBD
15	"Ben"	June 24, 2022	0.0	0.25	TBD	TBD	TBD	TBD
16	"My Family, My Blood"	July 1, 2022	0.0	0.22	TBD	TBD	TBD	TBD
17	"There's No One Around to Watch You Drown"	July 8, 2022	0.1	0.28	TBD	TBD	TBD	TBD
18	"A Writer of Dubious Talent"	August 5, 2022	0.0	0.24	TBD	TBD	TBD	TBD
19	"But a Drug Scandal?"	August 12, 2022	0.0	0.22	TBD	TBD	TBD	TBD
20	"First Kidnapping and Now Theft"	September 2, 2022	0.0	0.18	TBD	TBD	TBD	TBD
21	"More Power to Her"	September 9, 2022	0.0	0.17	TBD	TBD	TBD	TBD
22	"Catch 22"	September 16, 2022	0.0	0.19	TBD	TBD	TBD	TBD

=== Critical response ===
According to Clarise Tujardon of The Lasso, "The fifth and final season partly made up for the disappointment it has given the viewer for the past three seasons, there were still some aspects of the show that made no sense and lacked the dramatic, legendary feel that the original Dynasty had and continues to do so to this day." Tujardon praised the writing for the storyline surrounding Cristal's doppelgänger (Daniella Alonso) and the introduction of Blake's brother, Ben Carrington (Brett Tucker), two popular storylines from the original series, as well as the character development of Alexis (Elaine Hendrix), and Fallon's marriage to Liam and subsequent fertility issues. Tujardon noted that the best part of this season is Cristal's character development. "This season, she inherited her family's company, rebuilt her relationship with her husband, Blake, and gained the confidence she lost after losing her baby in season two, which made her a well beloved character in the series, and gave a nostalgia feel that the legendary Linda Evans did during the run of the original Dynasty." However, Tujardon criticized the inclusion of Sam, Michael, and Kirby as "boring characters that no longer needed to be on the show," as well as the acting of Michael Michele as Dominique Deveraux, deemed disgraceful, "because she portrays the character as cheap, crude, tacky, and a woman who has no class, as opposed to the Carroll's version."

The series finale received critical acclaim for the return of James Mackay as Steven Carrington.
