= Alexis Colby =

Fictional character on the American TV series Dynasty

- Dynasty character
- Joan Collins as Alexis Colby
- Portrayed by: Joan Collins
- Duration: 1981–1989, 1991
- First appearance: "The Testimony" (1981, non-speaking, face unseen); "Enter Alexis" (1981)
- Last appearance: Dynasty: The Reunion (1991)
- Created by: Richard and Esther Shapiro
- Spin-off appearances: Dynasty: The Reunion (1991)
In-universe information
- Other names: Alexis Morell Carrington Colby Dexter Rowan
- Occupation: Socialite; Businesswoman
- Father: Steven Morell
- Sisters: Cassandra Morell
- Spouse: Blake Carrington; Cecil Colby; Dex Dexter; Sean Rowan
- Children: Adam Carrington; Fallon Carrington; Steven Carrington; Amanda Carrington
- Grandchildren: L.B. Colby; Lauren Colby; Danny Carrington; Unnamed son of Adam Carrington and Karen Atkinson
- First cousins: Rosalind Bedford; Sable Scott Colby; Francesca Scott Colby

Alexis Carrington Colby (née Morell, formerly Dexter and Rowan) is a fictional character on the American TV series Dynasty. She is the ex-wife of Blake Carrington (John Forsythe) and her schemes cause one problem after another for him and their children.

The role was originated by Joan Collins in the first episode of the show's second season in 1981, though the character appeared briefly in the first-season finale, non-speaking and face unseen. Collins remained on the show until the finale in 1989, and then returned as Alexis for the 1991 miniseries Dynasty: The Reunion. The character appeared later in the first season of the 2017 Dynasty reboot series, portrayed by Nicollette Sheridan from the sixteenth episode of the first season to the fifteenth episode of the second season. Actress Amy Sutherland played a bandaged, non-speaking Alexis in the sixteenth and seventeenth episodes of the second season. Elizabeth Gillies, who stars as Alexis's daughter Fallon, played the role of Alexis after Sheridan's departure for three episodes near the end of the second season. The role was recast with Elaine Hendrix for season three.

Alexis' schemes to destroy ex-husband Blake, undermine his marriage to Krystle (Linda Evans), and control her children drive much of the action over the series' run. Passionate, shrewd, and vengeful, Alexis loves her children fiercely and will do anything to protect them, but she often ignores their own needs and desires in place of what she thinks is best. Alexis marries three additional times, to Cecil Colby (Lloyd Bochner), Dex Dexter (Michael Nader), and Sean Rowan (James Healey). She is widowed twice, first by Cecil and then by fourth husband Sean, prompting Alexis' cousin Sable to remark that with Alexis "death is always a simpler solution than divorce." Her third marriage (to Dex) ends in divorce after Alexis catches him in bed with her adult daughter Amanda (Catherine Oxenberg). The name Alexis uses the most consistently over the course of the series is Alexis Colby, though her marriage to Cecil Colby is her shortest. Alexis is romantically linked to a number of men over the years, including oilman Rashid Ahmed (John Saxon); tennis pro (and Krystle's first husband) Mark Jennings (Geoffrey Scott); King Galen of Moldavia (Joel Fabiani); shipping tycoon Zach Powers (Ricardo Montalbán); Congressman Neal McVane (Paul Burke); Blake's brother Ben Carrington (Christopher Cazenove); Dirk Maurier (Jon Cypher) and his nephew Gavin Maurier (Neil Dickson); Cecil's brother Jason Colby (Charlton Heston); and even a near-reconciliation with an amnesiac Blake.

TV Guide named Alexis No. 7 in its 2013 list of "The 60 Nastiest Villains of All Time", and in 2016 Rolling Stone ranked her No. 27 of its "40 Greatest TV Villains of All Time". In 2015, executive producer Lee Daniels noted that Taraji P. Henson's character Cookie Lyon in his TV series Empire was partially based on Alexis.

== Original series ==
=== Development and casting ===
In the first-season finale episode, "The Testimony", Blake Carrington is on trial for murder, and a female mystery witness in a large hat and veil appears. Writers Eileen and Robert Mason Pollock, brought in for season two, were told by series creators Richard and Esther Shapiro that the character would be Blake's ex-wife Madeline, who would be played by Sophia Loren for four to six episodes. The Pollocks renamed her Alexis, told executive producer Aaron Spelling that Loren was not right for the part, and warned him that "If you get rid of this character in four episodes, you are throwing away hundreds of millions of dollars." Joan Collins said in 2018 that in addition to Loren, producers pursued Elizabeth Taylor and Jessica Walter. According to Collins, "They were waiting for Jessica until the very last minute, so they didn't cast me until two weeks before we started shooting."

Esther Shapiro later said that the character of Alexis was based on the Roman empress Livia as characterized in the 1934 novel I, Claudius. Of creating the character, Collins said in 2018, "I was basing her on all the businessmen I knew who were heartless, really. The other part of her brain, the glamorous part with the over-the-top clothes, I based on one of my best friends called Cappy Badrutt. She was extremely glamorous, and unfortunately very miserable. But I don't think Alexis was miserable. I think she enjoyed her life and lived it to the fullest." She had previously singled out Donald Trump to be one inspiration for the character in a 2013 PBS interview.

Shapiro said in 1985 that she and costume designer Nolan Miller "had the same vision" for Alexis: Joan Crawford. She added, "Nolan had designed for Crawford, and he told me that she had a photo index of every outfit she owned. Everything was coordinated: Each dress had its own particular hat, purse, gloves, shoes, and it never varied. Joan Crawford didn't mix and match. We decided to take it one step further: Alexis would never wear the same thing twice. In fact, no one on Dynasty would."

=== Characterization ===
The character of Alexis is a foil for "good girl" Krystle (Linda Evans), with an opposing moral stature and attitude. Described as "scheming, conniving, and ruthless", Alexis was often called a "superbitch" and the "quintessential character you love to hate" by critics. Vernon Scott of the Sun-Sentinel called the character "the scourge of Dynasty".

In 2018, Collins said that she invented Alexis's backstory as a socialite exiled by Blake after he caught her having an affair. She said "Alexis had the affair because Blake was at his oil rigs all the time. She'd been young and lonely, and now she wanted to beat him at his own game. And she succeeded in many ways. I think that's what made the show so interesting and popular." Collins said in 2017:

I went into the show, I was told that it was a failing show and that it was about to be cancelled, so they expected me to bring something to it to make it much more interesting to the viewer. That was a challenge, and it wasn't necessarily all in the writing. But I did find that the character was multifaceted, and wasn't just the plain old straightforward bitch type. I tried to give her a sense of humor, I tried to give her vulnerability, because she was betrayed by her ex-husband and her whole family, and I tried to bring other dimensions to the character.

=== Appearances ===
Though Maggie Wickman appeared briefly at the end of the first-season finale as the veiled surprise witness, the role of Alexis was originated by Joan Collins in the first episode of the show's second season in 1981. Collins was an English actress with a prolific film and television career, best known at that point for appearing in the Bette Davis film The Virgin Queen (1955), and for B movies like Land of the Pharaohs (1955), The Stud (1978), and The Bitch (1979).

The addition of Alexis, as well as the Pollocks' change in the writing, were credited with lifting Dynasty in the ratings, and the character "quickly set off a host of female imitators in other prime-time soaps." Producer E. Duke Vincent said of Collins in 2005, "Joan Collins is the queen of the archetype … How do you get that? You get it in the storytelling, obviously, but the actress herself, her personality, brought something to that role which I don't think anybody else could have done." Spelling added, "We didn't write Joan Collins. She played Joan Collins … We wrote a character, but the character could have been played by 50 people and 49 of them would have failed. She made it work." Collins said in 2012 that Larry Hagman's performance as J.R. Ewing on Dallas had inspired her to play Alexis.

Alexis' annual catfights with Linda Evans' Krystle became eagerly anticipated, and Alexis would later have similar brawls with Dominique Deveraux (Diahann Carroll) and Sable Colby (Stephanie Beacham). As the sixth season began, Collins was in a tense contract renegotiation with the show, seeking an increased salary. The first episode of the new season, which followed the "Moldavian Massacre" cliffhanger, was rewritten without Alexis. Collins reportedly signed a $60,000 per episode contract, and returned for the season's second episode.

Dynasty declined in ratings in later seasons. Brought on for season nine, executive producer David Paulsen found that there was no money left in the budget for any shoots outside of the studio, which he felt were important for the show. He hoped to reduce costs for the season by, among other things, cutting Collins from 22 episodes to 11 (she ultimately appeared in 13). At that time, she reportedly earned at least $100,000 per episode. Paulsen also brought in Beacham as her The Colbys character Sable to play opposite Collins. The ninth-season finale ended with several characters in peril, including Alexis and Dex plunging from a balcony, which Paulsen said "meant that the following year we could get rid of anybody we wished." Paulsen said "I think Joan Collins was angry because she kind of saw what I was doing." Collins was subsequently quoted at the Cannes Film Festival saying that she would not return the next season. However, in May 1989, new ABC entertainment president Robert A. Iger cancelled Dynasty, leaving the cliffhanger last episode of season nine as the series finale. The majority of the cast, including Collins, reunited for the two-part, four-hour miniseries Dynasty: The Reunion in 1991.

=== Storylines ===
==== Season 1 ====
In Dynasty's first-season finale episode, "The Testimony", Blake Carrington is on trial for killing his son Steven's male lover, Ted Dinard. A veiled surprise witness for the prosecution appears, and Blake angrily asks his lawyer: "What's she doing here?" Blake's daughter Fallon gasps in recognition, "Oh my God, that's my mother."

==== Season 2 ====
As the second season opens with the episode "Enter Alexis", the character has not only a face but a name: Alexis Morell Carrington. She had been exiled from Denver by Blake after an affair with Carrington estate manager Roger Grimes; her testimony, that Blake has a violent temper, proves damaging to his case. At odds with his father, Steven is drawn to the mother he hardly remembers; Fallon, however, is devoted to Blake and has long held a grudge against Alexis, a grudge further fueled by her testimony. Fallon says to her mother:

You're even more beautiful and more ugly than that grand English lady I vaguely remember, and whom I've tried very hard to forget existed these past sixteen years.

— Fallon Carrington Colby, "Enter Alexis"

Alexis soon sparks the ire of Blake's wife Krystle, and brazenly moves into a cottage on the Carrington estate: her former art studio which she still owns, thanks to a technicality. The household staff remembers the first Mrs. Carrington all too well—especially longtime Carrington majordomo Joseph Anders. Staunchly loyal to Blake, Joseph has a particular dislike for Alexis and has followed her scandalous adventures for years through the tabloids. Fallon, although not openly hostile, keeps an icy distance from Alexis and the two trade subtle barbs; Steven is seduced by his mother's apparent devotion to him, but soon gets a taste of her poison. According to Alexis, Fallon is not Blake's daughter at all: her father is really Blake's longtime friend and business rival, Cecil Colby. The secret eats at Steven, and Fallon eventually finds out. Ultimately, it is proven untrue. Alexis' consistent meddling and intrusions help improve Krystle's relationship with Fallon, Joseph, and the rest of the household staff, and they soon accept her unconditionally as Blake's wife. Alexis makes an enemy in Krystle when she purposefully fires a shotgun to make Krystle's horse throw her; the pregnant Krystle miscarries and is told she will probably be unable to have more. Alexis becomes romantically involved with Cecil, now Blake's adversary, but Cecil has a heart attack while in bed with her.

==== Season 3 ====
In 1982, Alexis and Cecil marry on his deathbed (episode 40), Cecil exacting a promise from Alexis that she will use his company ColbyCo to ruin Blake, a condition that Alexis happily accepts. Two episodes previously, after their infant grandson L.B. Colby (son of Fallon and Jeff Colby) is kidnapped, former spouses Blake and Alexis make a televised plea that he be returned. Alexis confesses a dark secret from their past: their firstborn son, Adam, had been kidnapped as a baby and had never been returned. Traumatized by the event, they had hidden his existence from their subsequent children, Fallon and Steven. Meanwhile, in Billings, Montana, an old woman named Kate Torrance tearfully tells her grandson Michael that he is really the Carrington heir. Armed with items from Adam Carrington's baby carriage, lawyer "Michael" comes to Denver and is eventually accepted as a Carrington; but like Alexis, his selfishness, greed and ambition put him at odds with all of his relatives at one time or another.

In episode 42, Alexis offers Adam a job at ColbyCo. When she also recruits Fallon's husband Jeff, Adam is jealous. Revealing his devious nature, Adam has Jeff's office painted with toxic paint. Gradually, Jeff's behavior becomes increasingly erratic. In episode 51, Alexis sends Jeff away on a vacation. Realizing that Jeff will "recover" when he's not breathing toxic fumes every day, Adam confesses to Alexis, who orders Adam to have the paint removed from Jeff's office. Adam warns his mother that if she betrays him, he will implicate her in the scheme, since Alexis used Jeff's poor health to trick him into signing over his son's shares in Denver-Carrington to her.

==== Season 4 ====
In episode 66, Alexis learns that Fallon is investigating Jeff's mysterious illness and warns Adam that if Fallon learns the truth that he's on his own. In return, Adam tricks Alexis into signing documents that make it look like she ordered the office to be painted. Alexis travels to Montana to investigate her son's background and learns from Dr. Edwards that Adam had experimented with drugs as a teen and suffered a psychotic breakdown. She becomes more sympathetic to Adam at this point, feeling guilty that they gave up the search for their lost son so many years ago, condemning him to such a tragic life. As she doesn't want his past drug addiction to be widely known, Alexis is resigned to suffer the consequences of his actions. Therefore, she gave up her control of Denver-Carrington.

Later, in 1983, she becomes romantically involved with Farnsworth "Dex" Dexter, the son of a Denver-Carrington board member Sam Dexter, an old friend of Blake Carrington's. Dex has been sent by his father to understand why ColbyCo. abruptly abandoned its plans to acquire Denver-Carrington. In episode 69, Dex confronts Blake and his ex-wife Alexis Colby. Dex and Alexis are immediately drawn to each other. Dex gets the best of Alexis in a business deal (he discovers information in her office and acts on it before she can) and offers her a 60–40 split so they can work together. Although Alexis resists, by episode 72 they become lovers.

Their relationship is tempestuous and passionate. In episodes 82 and 83, Dex learns that Alexis has slept with Rashid Ahmed in order to sabotage a deal he has with Blake. A furious Dex confronts Alexis. She slaps him, and much to her shock, he slaps her back. Their fight soon turns into a passionate kiss, before Dex resists. Dex turns to recently fired Denver-Carrington PR Director Tracy Kendall for solace in a one-night stand, then pays Tracy to get a job at ColbyCo to spy on Alexis for him. Tracy, fed up with Dex's obsession with Alexis, tells Alexis about Dex's plan. Alexis is simultaneously angry and intrigued, eventually reuniting with Dex before Fallon's wedding and her arrest for Mark Jennings' murder.

==== Season 5 ====
After Alexis was arrested for the murder of Mark Jennings in episode 88, Dex rallies to her defense and bails her out of jail. Once she is found guilty because Steven testified against her, Dex and Adam desperately try to clear her name. They eventually uncover evidence that Neal McVane is the killer, trying to frame Alexis for ruining him. Alexis is freed.

Also around this time, Alexis meets a formidable new adversary in Dominique Deveraux, a glamorous, wealthy black woman who comes to Denver to reveal she is in fact Blake's secret half-sister. After Blake's father, Tom Carrington, makes Blake, Alexis and Dominique equal heirs to his estate after he dies, with Dominique as executor, Alexis is furious. She attempts to disrupt Dominique's businesses as much as possible but Dominique counters her at every turn proving herself to be every bit as tough as Alexis is. Their rivalry would span three seasons of the series.

Also in 1984, a young woman named Amanda Bedford appears on Alexis' doorstep; she is Alexis' daughter, (Note: Amanda's arrival is foreshadowed in the season four episode "The Birthday" when Alexis mentions that she has been through four pregnancies. Krystle notes the discrepancy (at this time, Alexis is known to have just three children, Adam, Fallon and Steven), but Alexis explains that one resulted in a miscarriage. Amanda appears 11 episodes later in "Amanda.") and as news of her spreads, Blake takes a special interest. He soon learns that Alexis was pregnant when he banished her decades before. Though Alexis insists that Amanda's father is a ski instructor with whom she was involved, it is eventually revealed that she is indeed Blake's daughter.

Unaware of the brief affair Amanda had with Dex when they found themselves snowed in together in a remote cabin, Alexis proposes Dex to marry her and, as he regrets his actions, he accepts the proposal. Later, Alexis becomes suspicious and tries to keeps Amanda out from Dex by marrying her to Prince Michael of Moldavia, son of King Galen that she had known years ago. But during the wedding celebration which takes place in the 15 May 1985 season finale "Royal Wedding", terrorists interrupt the ceremony in an attempt to kill Galen and spray the chapel with gunfire, leaving the entire wedding party seemingly dead or dying on the floor.

==== Season 6 ====
Alexis survives the wedding massacre, as do most of the wedding guests, but she is kept as prisoner as the rebels want to sign a deal with ColbyCo. Eventually she is released when Blake pays ransom for her (and for Krystle who was also imprisoned). The King is missing and presumed dead, however, Alexis learns that he is being held for ransom. Dex agrees to help her rescue the King. They sneak into Moldavia where they are captured. In episode 125, Dex escapes and rescues Alexis and Galen. Upon returning to Denver, Dex refuses to let a paralyzed Galen recuperate in their home. Dex suspects (correctly) that Galen is feigning his paralysis and tries to force him to walk. When Alexis rushes to his defense, Dex is driven closer to Amanda. When Dex catches Alexis imagining herself as Queen of Moldavia (complete with crown) in episode 135, he is heartbroken. Amanda finds a drunken Dex and they make love again - only to be caught in the act by Alexis in episode 136. Alexis immediately flies to St Thomas for a quick divorce.

In the meantime, Alexis' younger sister Cassandra Morell is released from a Caracas, Venezuela prison, having been incarcerated years before after an incident involving Alexis and her then-paramour, Zach Powers. Calling herself Caress, the younger Morell comes to Denver and hopes to make a fortune by writing a scathing tell-all book about Alexis and exposing her sister's darkest secrets. Alexis finds out about the book, secretly buys the publishing company and scuttles the project.

In 1986, Alexis turns on Blake as she wants him again in her life (episode 137). When he refuses to have an affair with her, she decides to destroy him for good. She flies to Australia and encourages Blake's brother Ben to come back in Denver and claim his share of his late father's estate. Alexis commits perjury on the stand and helps Ben to win over Blake during the trial (episodes 141 & 142). Wanting revenge, Blake mortgages his house and holdings on the hope that he will gain control over ColbyCo. Thanks to Ben and Alexis, he loses both the house and the holdings and also his lucrative South China Sea oil leases. In the cliffhanger season finale, Alexis informs Blake she has bought his house. Furious, he grabs her by the throat and starts to strangle her.

==== Season 7 ====
Alexis is saved when Krystle pulls Blake off of her. Weeks after, Blake finds a way to force Alexis and Ben to relinquish their ownership of Denver-Carrington and all its holdings back to him. Later on, Blake, Alexis, and Ben are in southeast Asia visiting an oil rig when it catches on fire. Ben rescues a trapped Blake moments before the rig explodes. Blake awakens in the hospital with no memories of the last 25 years. Alexis has him discharged from the hospital and convinces him that they're still married. However, when Krystle finds them, Blake's memories return. While angry at being deceived by Alexis, he forgives her and they reach a more peaceful coexistence.

==== Season 8 ====
A handsome stranger saves Alexis from drowning in a river in 1987; dashing Sean Rowan soon sweeps her off her feet and they marry. Sean soon insinuates himself into her business, alienating Alexis' son Adam. It is revealed that Sean is actually the son of former Carrington majordomo Joseph Anders, and is bent on avenging his father (who committed suicide) and sister, Kirby (who had been ill-treated by Alexis). Sean has an affair with Leslie Carrington and schemes to destroy the family, but is ultimately killed by Dex after trying to kill Alexis.

==== Season 9 ====
A body is found at the bottom of a lake on the Carrington property in 1988. The dead body turns out to be Roger Grimes, the man with whom Alexis was sleeping when she and Blake divorced. He had been dead for 20 years but the cold temperatures in the lake preserved his body. Ultimately, it is revealed that 8-year-old Fallon had shot Grimes after finding him beating Alexis, and Blake's late father had hidden the body in a mine under the lake to protect Fallon.

The situation is complicated by the fact that the mine is full of stolen Nazi treasure, hidden there by Blake's late father. Roger's body had been disturbed from its hiding place by a man looking for the treasure. The man happens to have been hired by Alexis' cousin Sable Colby, who was looking for some embarrassing information on her ex-husband Jason. But Sable has not come to Denver for having a revenge on Jason only but also on Alexis, who has betrayed her at several times in the past. Most of the season's action revolves around the battle between Alexis and Sable.

In episode 220, the final episode of the series, at the Carlton Hotel Dex confronts Sable and Alexis for using him and throwing him aside. He mentions that Sable is pregnant, much to her chagrin. Alexis and Adam taunt Dex with the news, causing Dex to push Adam to the floor in frustration. When Dex turns his back, Adam rushes him. Dex falls backward into Alexis, sending them both crashing through a railing and falling off a second-story balcony while Adam, Sable, and Monica (Sable's daughter) watch in horror.

==== The Reunion ====
Two years after her fall at the Carlton, in 1991, Alexis (who managed to turn in mid-air and land on top of Dex, who "didn't fare that well") meets Jeremy Van Dorn, head of Trans-Media Relations, who convinces her she needs to diversify her business. However, Jeremy is actually working for an international consortium who has its eye on ColbyCo. When Alexis learns the truth and wants to put an end to their partnership, Jeremy tries to kill her but she is saved at the last minute by Adam.

=== Impact ===
The additions of Collins as Alexis and the "formidable writing team" of Eileen and Robert Mason Pollock are generally credited with Dynasty's rise in the Nielsen ratings in its second season, the start of the series' rise to #1. Collins's performance "set off a host of female imitators in other prime time soaps." Esther Shapiro said in the season one DVD commentary, "When Alexis came into it, it changed the tenor ... And that's the way they are now on television: you have your traditional villain, and I think that plays to a different denominator."

In 2002, TV Guide ranked Alexis number 40 on its list of the 50 Greatest Television Characters of All Time. The magazine named her #7 in its 2013 list of The 60 Nastiest Villains of All Time, and in 2016 Rolling Stone ranked her #27 of its 40 Greatest TV Villains of All Time.

In 2015, executive producer Lee Daniels noted that Taraji P. Henson's character Cookie Lyon in his TV series Empire was partially based on Alexis. Praising Cookie and Henson, several journalists have compared Cookie to Alexis.

=== Awards and nominations ===
Collins was nominated for a Golden Globe Award for Best Actress in a Television Drama Series every year from 1981 to 1986, winning in 1983. She was nominated for an Emmy Award for Lead Actress in a Drama Series in 1984. In 1985, Collins shared a People's Choice Award for Favorite Female TV Performer with her co-star, Linda Evans. She won a Soap Opera Digest Award for Outstanding Villainess in 1984, and again in 1985.

== Reboot ==
Alexis Carrington Colby
- Dynasty character
- Nicollette Sheridan portrays Alexis Carrington in seasons one and two.
- Portrayed by: Nicollette Sheridan (2018–2019); Amy Sutherland (2019); Elizabeth Gillies (2019); Elaine Hendrix (2019–2022)
- Duration: 2018–2022
- First appearance: "Poor Little Rich Girl" (2018)
- Last appearance: "Catch 22" (2022)
- Created by: Sallie Patrick; Richard and Esther Shapiro
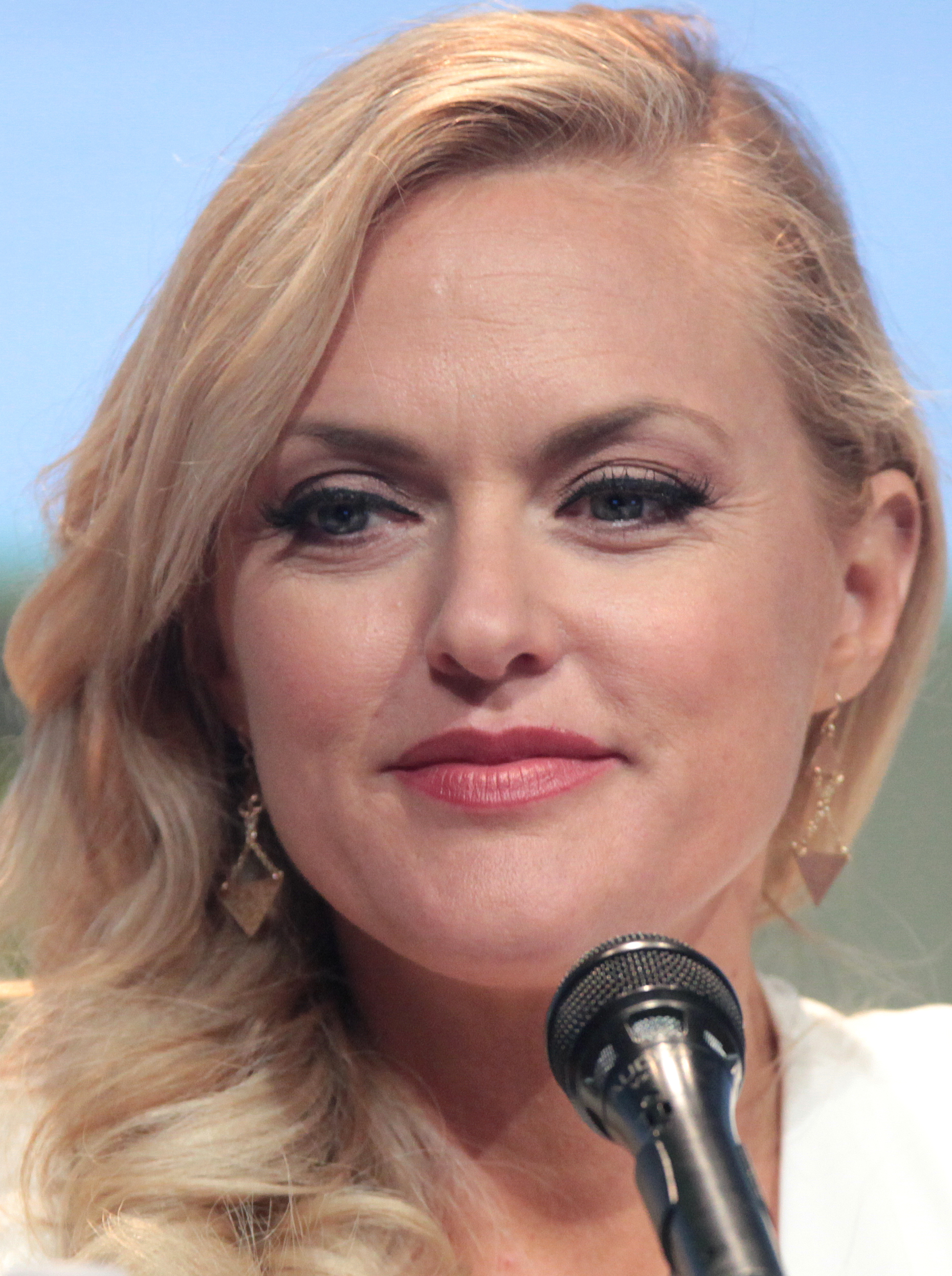
- Elaine Hendrix portrays Alexis Carrington Colby in seasons three through five.
In-universe information
- Other names: Alexis Morell Carrington Colby Dexter
- Occupation: Socialite; Businesswoman; Entertainment personality
- Spouse: Blake Carrington; Jeff Colby; Dex Dexter
- Children: Adam Carrington; Steven Carrington; Fallon Carrington; Amanda Carrington
- Grandchildren: Lauren Carrington-Ridley

=== Development and casting ===
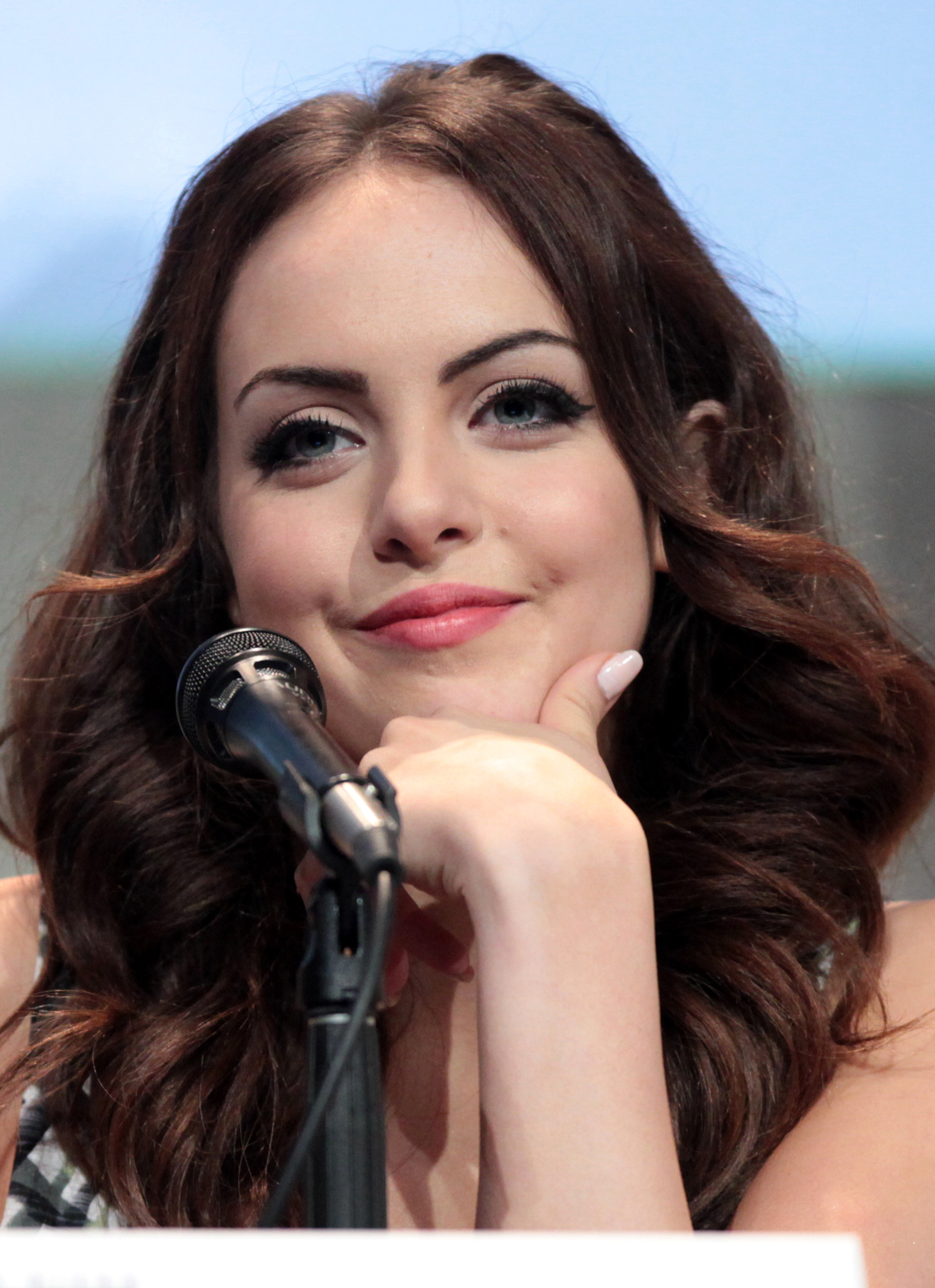
Elizabeth Gillies, who stars as Fallon, played Alexis for three episodes after Sheridan's departure in season two.

A Dynasty reboot premiered on The CW on October 11, 2017. Executive producer Sallie Patrick said in August 2017 that Alexis would be introduced during the first season, but that the role had yet to be cast. She later said "We knew Alexis was coming before we even started shooting the pilot, which allowed us to pave the way for her ... throughout the season, we hear Blake, Steven, and Fallon's memories about the woman who abandoned their family. So by the time she actually enters the series, we've established expectations about her character—which Alexis will happily break." The character has a cameo in the pilot episode, seen briefly in a flashback sequence. Patrick said in September 2017:

There are certainly Easter eggs along the way until her grand entrance. What we like is that we know when she's coming. I'm not sure they knew their timing of her [on the original Dynasty], so she was really absent from the first year. When she did show up, it was a huge twist and a great surprise. Since we live in a world that already knows about Alexis and knows about Joan Collins, we thought it'd be fun to build up that wonderful, delicious character before her grand entrance. We can only bring her in once, so we're taking our time to figure it out.

==== Nicollette Sheridan ====
The role was cast with Nicollette Sheridan in November 2017. Sheridan, known for portraying Paige Matheson on Knots Landing and Edie Britt on Desperate Housewives, had been absent from series television since her character was killed off Desperate Housewives in 2009. Though a longtime friend of Joan Collins, and a 1980s soap star herself, Sheridan claimed to have never seen the 1980s version of Dynasty. The CW president Mark Pedowitz, who had been president of ABC Studios during Sheridan's run on Desperate Housewives, called her about the role himself. He said "I was big fan of Nicollette from way back when. She wanted it, and she will be great in it." Sheridan said of the Dynasty role, "I thought [Dynasty] was such a splashy, fun, strong comeback. It was just the right thing at the right time." Sheridan admitted, "I have always been attracted to playing the naughty girl. And for some reason, my audience loves seeing me in that role. It's challenging to make that person likable, and I get to do it again [with Alexis]." Sheridan's casting was a key factor in the decision to give Dynasty a back nine order of episodes after the initial 13. Pedowitz said in January 2018, "I'm disappointed in the ratings, I wanted it to do more, but I'm happy with the production values that Josh, Steph and Sallie are doing. There are changes coming, I'm thrilled to have Nicollette [Sheridan] ... I'm looking forward to Nicollette and Liz [Gillies] really going at it as a mother-daughter situation, and I think that will add some juice to the show."

A press release announced that the character "will return unexpectedly ... challenging Blake's marriage to Cristal, seeking to reunite with her children, and fighting to claim what is hers." Alexis first appeared in the season one episode "Poor Little Rich Girl" on March 23, 2018. Patrick said:

We've found our own way to pay tribute to Alexis' OG entrance and that fabulous outfit. Just as in the original series, Alexis will shake up familiar dynamics and threatens relationships—Blake and Cristal, Blake and Fallon, even Fallon and Steven. And while she says she's back for her children, with Alexis you always have to wonder if what she says is true.

Pedowitz later said "Nicollette has been a great addition. She is a disrupting force, she is that diva." The CW announced on February 25, 2019, that Sheridan would be leaving Dynasty to focus on "some personal family responsibilities." Sheridan said in her own statement that she was leaving to spend more time with her terminally ill mother in Los Angeles. She last appeared in the season two episode "Motherly Overprotectiveness".

==== Elizabeth Gillies ====
Elizabeth Gillies, who was already playing Fallon on the show, took over the role after Sheridan's departure for three episodes near the end of the second season. In the story, Alexis's vengeful son Adam (Sam Underwood) pushes her face into a fire, and then arranges for her plastic surgeon to make her look like Fallon. Gillies's portrayal, facilitated by prosthetics, was a temporary recast to give producers time to find a suitable replacement for Sheridan. Patrick explained that the news of Sheridan's departure was sudden, but producers did not want to rush replacing her and "compromise the integrity of the casting process". She said "We have an amazing cast and wanted to add someone of their caliber to that role. We wanted to take our time with that." Patrick added, "In the spirit of the OG Dynasty, we just went for the biggest twist possible as an homage to the double castings and doppelgängers they had on the original series." Gillies said:

I've always loved the character of Alexis, even from the original Dynasty. I'm a huge Joan Collins fan, and what Nicollette did with the role was wonderful. She made it her own, and she developed such a following with her version of Alexis. When they presented it to me, I thought it was crazy, but I love a challenge...Whatever I did, I was really paying tribute to the character that Nicollette built and carrying on the storyline that she had taken on so far. I did my best to embody everything she built with the character...It was pretty exciting. I was flattered they asked me, and I hope that once the fans see more, they'll embrace it. It's all in good fun.

Gillies said of Sheridan, "She has a very specific cadence in her speech, a way of talking that took a minute for me to make sure it was right...I hope she likes it. I really tried to do my absolute best." Gillies said "Grant Show couldn't even look at me...he was being incredibly squirmy and uncomfortable. It was probably my favorite of all the scenes I shot [as Alexis]. He's so funny and earnest in his performance, because he really is so uncomfortable." Gillies explained that a lifecast was made of her to create the prosthetics, which took five hours to get into and about 45 minutes to get out of. Though Gillies said that she enjoyed the double role and would do it again if asked, she and Patrick agreed that "production-wise, it's challenging."

Reed Gaudens of Hidden Remote said "Elizabeth Gillies's spot-on Nicollette Sheridan impression is Emmy-worthy." Andy Swift of TVLine called Gillies's portrayal of Alexis "the performance of a lifetime."

==== Elaine Hendrix ====
In October 2019, new Dynasty showrunner Josh Reims said "Obviously she's Alexis and this is Dynasty, so I would imagine she may show up at one point." Days later, it was announced that the role of Alexis had been recast with Elaine Hendrix, who would appear as a series regular. The CW noted that "Alexis is back in Atlanta, with a new look, a new man, and plenty of scores to settle". Of Hendrix's performance, costar Adam Huber stated, "She brings a new energy to [the role], she's excited to bring this character to life and to make it her own and not go off what Nicollette [Sheridan] did or what the actors did on the original." Hendrix debuted as Alexis in the December 2019 episode "The Sensational Blake Carrington Trial". She said "[The producers] encouraged me to make it my own, and I have been", describing her performance as "a throwback to the OG Dynasty, while also honoring the tone of what's happening now." She added, "I'm just ready to be ruthless ... I'm ready to burn it all down."

=== Characterization ===
Sheridan called Alexis "a force to be reckoned with", explaining that "She's a complicated person who is driven by power, money, and the dichotomy of an overwhelming desire to protect her children to have them flourish. She is back to reclaim both of her children and help them onto a different path." She said that the character "truly is a loving mother", though "sometimes she gets a little lost in her quest for power or manipulation." Of Fallon she noted, "Fallon Carrington is fierce, and upon mama's return, she has met her match tenfold. Alexis has the experience and the wisdom that comes with age. So as brilliant as her daughter is, she's in trouble now. [The writers] are really exploring the mother-daughter relationship, which to me is the most complicated relationship on the planet, so I love that." Patrick said "It's been a blast writing for Alexis, who in our version is part Mildred Pierce (willing to do anything to help her daughter), part Blue Jasmine (delusional on the verge of a nervous breakdown), and Nicollette is perfect for the role. When she goes toe-to-toe with Fallon, it's electric." Sheridan said of her character's relationship with her ex-husband, "[Alexis] and Blake were truly soulmates at one point in time, but their relationship was fraught. They have a very tempestuous dynamic which speaks to the passion that's still there."

Hendrix said of Alexis, "I'm really thinking about what drives Alexis. She's a survivor, and she loves her kids. With those two elements alone, she'll do anything to anyone anywhere at any time." Explaining Alexis's sudden marriage to Jeff Colby (Sam Adegoke), she said "They're putting it out there to the world that they love each other, but of course nobody believes them. Personally, I think she really does care about Jeff." Noting that in the 1980s series Alexis (Joan Collins) marries wealthy Cecil Colby (Lloyd Bochner) but he dies, Hendrix said "I love Sam Adegoke, so I'm really hoping the same thing doesn't happen to Jeff." Jeff asks Alexis for a divorce in the season three finale "My Hangover's Arrived", but she admits that she has feelings for him and thinks he has some for her. Reims explained Alexis's reveal: "It is genuine. She didn't go into that marriage expecting to like Jeff. It was purely a business arrangement, but she does like—as she said—being Mrs. Colby. She did develop feelings for him, and when she walks in on Jeff with Mia, it does hit her harder than she expected."

=== Storylines ===
==== Season one ====
In "Poor Little Rich Girl", Blake is eulogizing his father Thomas Carrington when a woman appears whom Fallon recognizes as her mother, Alexis. In "Enter Alexis", the Carringtons are shocked to discover that Thomas has left the mansion and the grounds to Alexis. Blake vows to overturn the codicil to Thomas' will as Fallon makes overtures to connect with her mother. Accused of abandoning her children, Alexis tells Fallon that Blake bribed a judge to seize custody and exile her, which Cristal confirms. Fallon soon discovers, however, that Alexis has not been living a life of luxury abroad, but is housed in a trailer nearby, and has stayed in touch with Steven. A furious Fallon confronts Alexis, and their catfight takes them into the pool. Through a bribe, Fallon ensures that the codicil is invalidated, but Alexis reveals that she does legally own Michael's stable house—her former art studio—and moves in. Her renewed influence over the household staff sets off Blake, who issues an ultimatum to them. Believing Steven's new fiancé Sam Jones to be a poor match for her son, Alexis tries to frame Sam for shoplifting in "Don't Con a Con Artist". Fallon thwarts the plan, and Sam assists her in a plot to expose Alexis' machinations to Steven. Fallon manipulates Alexis into confessing, but Steven is more mad at Fallon for endangering Sam. A tearful Alexis admits to Steven that she spent all of her money trying to find her and Blake's kidnapped first child, Adam. Distrusting of Fallon's faux husband Liam Ridley, Alexis tries to get between him and Fallon in "Use or Be Used". Alexis reveals to Fallon that Liam is really a journalist named Jack Lowden writing a tell-all, and Fallon cuts him loose. Alexis leaks information about Carrington Atlantic's possible involvement in an environmental scandal to the press in "A Line from the Past". As Alexis and Jeff discuss Blake's longstanding grudge against the Colbys, she tells him that he is actually a Carrington. In "Trashy Little Tramp", Steven finds his long-lost older brother Adam, now known as Hank Sullivan. In actuality, Hank is Alexis's lover and a key part of her master plan to steal Carrington Atlantic away from Blake. Things go awry in "Dead Scratch" when Fallon is unexpectedly promoted to CEO of the company, and Alexis loses influence over Jeff and Monica, who are determined to take from the Carringtons what they believe is owed to them. During Steven and Sam's wedding, Alexis has a nasty catfight with Cristal, who has discovered the truth about Hank. In order to buy time, Alexis locks Cristal in the stable house and encourages Hank to flee. The stables are later set on fire with the Carringtons trapped inside. Though Michael frees them, Alexis runs back upstairs to free Cristal.

==== Season two ====
In "Twenty-Three Skidoo", Alexis returns to Carrington Manor after a month-long stay in the hospital for smoke inhalation. Hank reveals he started the fire and threatens to go to the police about Alexis's subterfuge if she does not pay him $1 million. After Alexis has a heated argument with Blake about money, they have sex. In "Ship of Vipers", Alexis joins forces with Sam to determine if Melissa Daniels is really pregnant. Alexis gives Hank a painting to use as collateral until she can get him the money owed. In "The Butler Did It", Alexis and Anders are revealed to have had an affair that produced Steven. Fallon kicks Alexis out of the Manor in "Snowflakes in Hell", and she and Steven sever all ties with their mother. Alexis follows the Carringtons to Paraguay to mend her relationship with Steven, who in turn convinces Fallon to forgive Alexis. In "Queen of Cups", Hank starts to grow impatient with Alexis, who finds herself competing with Cristal Jennings for Blake's affections. A psychic predicts that Alexis will remarry but that the man will die; Alexis interprets this to be Blake. In "That Witch", Alexis sabotages Blake and Cristal's Thanksgiving travel plans while also obsessing over Blake's health. She acts as the Good Witch of the North in Fallon's Wizard of Oz fantasy and is later given a check by Fallon to aid in getting her life back together. Alexis gives this check to Hank, officially paying off her debt to him. Before leaving, however, Hank leaves Alexis with a baby. Christmas decorations start going up around the Manor in "A Temporary Infestation", so Alexis plants the baby in the nativity scene to be discovered by Sam. Alexis moves back into the restored stable house, but her war with Cristal reaches new heights as the two women scheme to drive each other away from the Manor. In the process, Cristal discovers Alexis to be in possession of the baby Jesus from the nativity scene, indicating she knows more about the mysterious baby than she has been letting on. In "A Real Instinct for the Jugular", Fallon includes Alexis in her wedding planning, but soon discovers her mother has ulterior motives. In exchange for talking Fallon out of trying to obtain the Swan House for her wedding venue, Mimi Rose Prescott has promised Alexis a place in the Peachtree Preservation Society. This leads to a falling out between mother and daughter, and Fallon uninviting Alexis to her wedding. In order to make things right with Fallon, Alexis backs into Mimi with her car to ensure she will not be having her wedding on the same day as Fallon, thus leaving the venue available. Fallon forgives Alexis and re-extends her invitation, though now having decided to have the wedding at the Manor. In "Crazy Lady", after baby L.B. has been kidnapped, Alexis and Blake make public plea to help find their "grandson". Alexis later convinces Hank's former accomplice, the mentally unstable Claudia Blaisdel, that he was a figment of her imagination in order to ensure her silence regarding Alexis's criminal activity.

Searching for a purpose, Alexis attempts to sell one of her paintings at a gala for Steven's foundation in "A Champagne Mood". She is less than thrilled to hear that Cristal is pregnant. Alexis feels, sad, unwanted, and replaced by Cristal in "The Sight of You", and plots Cristal's exile from the Manor once and for all. Alexis discovers that Cristal is unsure about the paternity of her unborn child in "Filthy Games", and sees to it that this information gets back to Blake. Later, to toy with the situation even further, she calls and invites Cristal's ex-husband Mark Jennings to the Manor. In "Even Worms Can Procreate", Alexis tries to manipulate Mark's unresolved feelings for Cristal in order to pit him against Blake, only to find herself continually pushed away by everyone around her. Cristal confronts Alexis once the paternity test comes back, confirming that the child is Blake's and insisting Alexis' time at the Manor is over. This sends Alexis over the edge, and she gets drunk, takes one of Blake's handguns, and prepares to commit suicide out by the stables. Just before pulling the trigger, however, she sees Cristal and Mark riding horses in the distance and fires the gun in their direction. Mark is killed, and Cristal is thrown from her horse and dragged. As police investigate the incident in "Parisian Legend Has It...", Alexis comforts Cristal and pins the crime on Blake's hitman Mack. The real Adam Carrington makes his way to the Manor in "Motherly Overprotectiveness", sending Alexis into a panic. She rejects Adam's claims and maintains that Hank is her son, all the while disposing of any evidence tying her to Hank's impersonation. Once Adam passes a DNA test, he confronts Alexis, knowing what she did, and she regretfully apologizes. Adam feigns forgiveness but then pushes Alexis's face into her lit fireplace. In "Miserably Ungrateful Men", Alexis's face is bandaged up and she is unable to speak, and the only people who express any interest in her predicament are Adam and Jeff Colby. Jeff offers to let Alexis recover at his home, but Adam convinces her to stay under his own care at the hospital. Before Alexis is sent in for facial reconstruction surgery, Adam gives the nurse a picture to use as a reference. In "How Two-Faced Can You Get", the bandages come off and Alexis's face is shaped to resemble Fallon's. Adam unveils Alexis's new face at a masquerade party in "Life is a Masquerade Party", but Alexis is met with shock and horror from the entire family, particularly Fallon. In "This Illness of Mine", Alexis is disgusted to learn that Adam is the reason she now has Fallon's face. Alexis makes amends with her daughter before leaving for Europe to have an entirely new face constructed. Alexis asks that Fallon keep her leaving the country a secret from Adam, and also warns her that Adam is dangerous.

==== Season three ====
Alexis returns to testify against Blake in "The Sensational Blake Carrington Trial", having married Jeff. In "The Caviar, I Trust, Is Not Burned", she testifies that she saw Blake murder Mack, but Fallon is able to prove that Alexis is lying, resulting in a mistrial. Dominique is especially upset over Jeff's marriage, and confronts Alexis. Later, Dominique takes a public tumble down the courthouse stairs and makes it look like Alexis pushed her. Alexis reaffirms her commitment to help Jeff destroy Blake. In "What Sorrows Are You Drowning?", Alexis learns that Cristal is investigating Mark's death herself, so Alexis attempts to collect the gun she used to shoot Mark. Realizing that Mack was not Mark's killer, Cristal confronts Alexis. When Alexis confesses, they brawl in the lily pond. In "A Wound That May Never Heal", Alexis manipulates Adam into helping her and Jeff in their plot against Blake, and convinces Adam to confess to poisoning Jeff on camera as a means for Adam to ingratiate himself to Jeff. Alexis and Jeff use blackmail to force a sale of Carrington Atlantic. Furious that Alexis caused her miscarriage, Cristal pays an assassin to kill Alexis in "You See Most Things in Terms of Black & White", but Alexis cheats death in "That Wicked Stepmother" when the car bomb is placed under the wrong SUV. In "Up a Tree", Alexis coerces Adam into helping an ailing Jeff by procuring experimental drugs not yet approved for Jeff's condition. Jeff refuses any help from Adam, so Alexis administers the drugs without Jeff knowing. Jeff collapses. Adam and Alexis scheme to steal a donor liver for Jeff in "Is the Next Surgery on the House?", but they fail. In "Robin Hood Rescues", Fallon is sued for bad advice Alexis gave in her podcast, but mother and daughter discover it is a scam. Alexis finds Jeff in bed with Mia in "My Hangover's Arrived", and he asks for a divorce. Alexis conspires to make Jeff think Mia is a prostitute, but he sees through the ruse. Alexis confesses her feelings for Jeff, and they have sex.

==== Season four ====
After Blake leverages all of his assets to save Carrington Atlantic, Alexis and Jeff purchase the loan in "That Unfortunate Dinner". Alexis tends to Fallon on her wedding day in "Vows Are Still Sacred" before claiming ownership of the manor once Blake is unable to pay back the loan. Realizing that Jeff wants children, Alexis ends their marriage amicably and forms an alliance with Dominique, who owns the mineral rights to everything beneath the Carringtons' property. Keeping their newfound partnership a secret, Alexis goes back into business with Jeff, who agrees to fund the excavation. Alexis and Dominique's attempts to manipulate Jeff fail as he discovers their partnership in "The Aftermath". Alexis refuses to sign the divorce papers, so Jeff moves into the manor.

== See also ==
- List of soap opera villains
