= Dynasty (2017 TV series) season 4 =

Dynasty
- Season 4
- Promotional poster
- Starring: Elizabeth Gillies; Daniella Alonso; Elaine Hendrix; Rafael de La Fuente; Sam Underwood; Michael Michele; Robert Christopher Riley; Sam Adegoke; Maddison Brown; Adam Huber; Alan Dale; Grant Show
- No. of episodes: 22

Release
- Original network: The CW
- Original release: May 7 – October 1, 2021

Season chronology
- ← Previous; Season 3 Next → Season 5

The fourth season of Dynasty, an American television series based on the 1980s prime time soap opera of the same name, premiered in the United States on The CW on May 7, 2021. The season is produced by CBS Television Studios, with Josh Reims as showrunner and executive producer alongside executive producers Josh Schwartz and Stephanie Savage. Dynasty was renewed for a fourth season on January 7, 2020, and for a fifth season on February 3, 2021.

Season four stars Elizabeth Gillies as Fallon Carrington, Grant Show as her father Blake Carrington, Daniella Alonso as Blake's wife Cristal, and Sam Underwood as Fallon's brother Adam Carrington, with Robert Christopher Riley as Michael Culhane; Sam Adegoke as Jeff Colby; Rafael de la Fuente as Sam Jones; Adam Huber as Liam Ridley; Alan Dale as Joseph Anders; Maddison Brown as Kirby; Michael Michele as Dominique Deveraux; and Elaine Hendrix as Alexis Carrington Colby. Notable recurring characters featured in season four include Wil Traval as Father Caleb Collins; Ashley Day as Colin McNaughton; Kara Royster as Eva; and Eliza Bennett as Amanda Carrington.

== Cast and characters ==
=== Main ===
- Elizabeth Gillies as Fallon Carrington, an heiress and businesswoman, daughter of billionaire Blake Carrington and his first wife, Alexis, and married to Liam
- Daniella Alonso as Cristal Jennings Carrington, Blake's third wife
- Elaine Hendrix as Alexis Carrington Colby, Blake and Jeff's ex-wife, and Adam, Steven, Fallon and Amanda's mother
- Rafael de La Fuente as Samuel Josiah "Sammy Jo" Jones Carrington, Steven Carrington's ex-husband, owner of the La Mirage Hotel
- Sam Underwood as Adam Carrington, Blake and Alexis's eldest son, a doctor
- Michael Michele as Dominique Deveraux, Jeff and Monica's mother and Blake's half-sister
- Robert Christopher Riley as Michael Culhane, former Carrington chauffeur, now owner of the Atlantix soccer team
- Sam Adegoke as Jeff Colby, Dominique's son, a billionaire tech genius
- Maddison Brown as Kirby Anders, Joseph's daughter
- Adam Huber as Liam Ridley, a writer and Fallon's husband
- Alan Dale as Joseph Anders, the Carrington majordomo
- Grant Show as Blake Carrington, billionaire and the father of Adam, Fallon and Amanda by his first wife, Alexis

=== Recurring ===
- Wil Traval as Father Caleb Collins, the hospital chaplain and Cristal's lover
- Lachlan Buchanan as Ryan, a stripper Sam marries briefly, and then dates
- Ashley Day as Colin McNaughton, Fallon's college nemesis
- Luke Cook as Oliver Noble, Kirby's Australian ex-boyfriend, a photographer
- David Aron Damane as Leo Abbott, a shady contractor
- Kara Royster as Eva, Fallon's new assistant and protégé
- Eliza Bennett as Amanda Carrington, Alexis's secret daughter by Blake, a lawyer raised in the UK

=== Guest ===
- Sharon Lawrence as Laura Van Kirk, Liam's mother
- Ken Kirby as Evan Tate, brother of Fallon's late childhood friend Trixie
- Roxzane Mims as Lo Cox, Dominique's mother
- Christian Ochoa as Victor Diaz, a player on the Atlantix
- Brian Littrell as himself
- Coby Ryan McLaughlin as Deputy Commissioner Dawkins
- Wakeema Hollis as Monica Colby, Jeff's sister
- Kelsey Scott as Martina, Fallon's interim assistant
- Shannon Thornton as Mia, who becomes romantically entangled with both Jeff and Michael
- Jesse Henderson as Nash Martinez, a college friend of Liam's
- Daniel Di Tomasso as Fletcher Myers, a public relations consultant who is Sam's ex
- Corbin Bleu as Blaine, a client of La Mirage
- Laura Leighton as Corinne Simon, an SEC officer
- Kevin Kilner as Bill North, a Georgia senator
- Stephanie Kurtzuba as Katy Lofflan, North's chief of staff
- Ramón De Ocampo as Nolan Jamison, a tech mogul and friend of Jeff's
- Daniela Lee as Jeanette, a Carrington maid
- NeNe Leakes as herself
- Grace Junot as Ellen, a board member at Fallon Unlimited
- Geovanni Gopradi as Roberto "Beto" Flores, Cristal's racketeer brother
- Randy J. Goodwin as Brady Lloyd, Dominique's ex-husband

== Episodes ==
Dynasty season 4 episodes
No. overall	No. in season	Title	Directed by	Written by	Original release date	U.S. viewers (millions)
65	1	"That Unfortunate Dinner"	Michael A. Allowitz	Libby Wells	May 7, 2021	0.24
Fallon's wedding plans suffer one setback after another, including the arrival of Liam's mother, Laura. Blake tries to reconcile with Cristal as he struggles to keep his company afloat. He puts up all his personal assets as collateral for a loan, unaware that the lenders are actually Jeff and Alexis. Sam and Ryan annul their marriage, but go on a date. Dominique seeks financing for her sleepwear line, to no avail. She tries to mend fences with her mother, who gives Dominique a safe deposit box key left to her by Thomas. Fallon and Liam's rehearsal dinner is ruined when Kirby inadvertently reveals Cristal's affair to everyone, and Cristal calls out Blake for sleeping with Laura. With Anders investigating his past in Montana, Adam admits his crimes to Kirby. Evan is revealed to be the wedding saboteur.
66	2	"Vows Are Still Sacred"	Michael A. Allowitz	Josh Reims & Jenna Richman	May 14, 2021	0.25
Fallon twists her ankle on the morning of her wedding to Liam. Adam gives Alexis and Jeff the information they need to make sure Blake is unable to repay the loan. Having inherited the mineral rights to the land below Carrington Manor, Dominique offers to sell them to Blake, who declines. Alexis and Jeff reveal to Blake that they bought the loan and will own the Manor if he does not repay it within the hour. Furious at both her parents, Fallon asks Liam to run off and get married at her high school theatre. Looking for Fallon at the Manor, Evan stabs Kirby and uses her phone to find Fallon. Dominique offers to sell the mineral rights to Alexis, and they join forces. Fallon and Liam marry, but an obsessed Evan appears with a knife. Liam and Blake work together against Evan, but Blake and Evan fall into the orchestra pit.
67	3	"The Aftermath"	Pascal Verschooris	Christopher Fife	May 21, 2021	0.24
Kirby and Blake survive, but Blake is temporarily paralyzed. Alexis has already moved into the Manor, but Fallon insists that a recuperating Blake remain there. Alexis and Jeff have agreed to divorce amicably, but she gets him to finance her dig for diamonds without mentioning that his mother Dominique is her partner. When Jeff learns the truth, he pulls his money out of the endeavor. Anders tries to keep Adam away from Kirby, and tricks him into a confession about his adoptive mother's death. Fallon insists on caring for both Blake and Kirby herself, but fails miserably. Cristal plans to leave Blake for Caleb, but Blake manipulates her into becoming his physical therapist. Traumatized by Evan's attack, Fallon is afraid to leave the Manor. Alexis tries to increase her divorce settlement from Jeff to pay for the excavation, but he counters with the fact that he still owns half of the Manor, and intends to move in.
68	4	"Everybody Loves the Carringtons"	Andi Behring	David M. Israel	May 28, 2021	0.19
Fallon and Liam return home from their honeymoon to find Jeff and Alexis battling in the Manor over the terms of their divorce, and Blake on his way out to move into La Mirage. Anxious to prove to the world that the Carringtons are not imploding, Fallon secures a big media interview that is subsequently threatened by the chaos going on at the Manor. Sam goes overboard sending gifts to Ryan. Blake tries to get back into Cristal's good graces, but she tells him that she is leaving him for Caleb. Blake concedes, but then threatens Caleb's life. Michael discovers a gambling ring run by the League's deputy commissioner and threatens to go public.
69	5	"New Hopes, New Beginnings"	Geary McLeod	Jason Ganzel	June 4, 2021	0.23
Michael considers selling the Atlantix. He plots to neutralize the deputy commissioner by having Sam offer him a bribe, but the commissioner propositions Sam instead. Fallon's efforts as the face of the new Carrington dynasty backfire, and her carefully laid plans fall apart one by one. Jeff and Dominique learn that Granny has died, and Monica returns. Dominique's heartfelt eulogy and promises to be a better mother begin to thaw her icy relationship with Jeff and Monica. Sam gets the commissioner to incriminate himself, which Michael uses to force him to approve a consortium of African-American buyers and then resign. Cristal confronts Blake about threatening Caleb. Blake apologizes, but manipulates the bishop to make it impossible for Caleb to leave the church. Acknowledging Caleb's commitment to his work, Cristal ends the relationship.
70	6	"A Little Father-Daughter Chat"	Star Barry	Aubrey Villalobos Karr	June 11, 2021	0.25
Blake's first day working for Fallon puts her company in turmoil, but she tries to bear it for the sake of family unity. Having sold the Atlantix, Michael is uncomfortable spending his new wealth. Blake makes inroads with Cristal by making time for her during his work day. Adam hopes to become chief of staff at the hospital but his nemesis, Dr. Bailey, vows to get the job herself and ruin him in the process. Ryan is accepted to a law school in Atlanta but can only afford to attend one in New Orleans. Wanting Ryan to stay in Atlanta but knowing he will not take money from him, Sam arranges a fake scholarship, which only makes things worse. Blake continues to ignore Fallon's leadership, so she fires him. Kirby helps Adam sabotage Bailey's presentation. Blake and Cristal kiss, and her advice leads Blake to apologize to Fallon. Michael smooths things over between Sam and Ryan by offering Ryan a loan and convincing him of Sam's good intentions. Anders sees Cristal nearly faint at La Mirage, but she insists nothing is wrong.
71	7	"The Birthday Party"	Kenny Leon	Katrina Cabrera Ortega	June 18, 2021	0.28
Fallon secretly invites Liam's college friend Nash to Atlanta to distract Liam while she finalizes a deal. Disapproving of Adam's relationship with Kirby, Alexis plans a birthday party for Adam on the same night as Kirby's party. Alexis has invited the hospital board, and manipulates Adam into choosing her party and not inviting Kirby. Michael is mistaken for a waiter at a charity event, but goes along with it to spend time with the event coordinator, Mia. Blake feigns sympathy for Dominique and tries to convince her that her mineral rights are worthless, but she and Alexis recognize the ruse. Nash tries to kiss Fallon and then attempts to blackmail her, but Fallon tricks him into revealing his machinations in front of Liam. Alexis and Dominique's mine yields its first handful of diamonds. Now aware of Michael's true identity, Mia rejects his advances. Kirby infiltrates the party and is successful in both strengthening her relationship with Adam and foiling Alexis's plans to get rid of her. Blake and Dominique, having deceived Alexis about the viability of the diamond mine, discuss their plan to take back Carrington Manor. Alexis invites Kirby's ex-boyfriend Oliver to Atlanta.
72	8	"Your Sick and Self-Serving Vendetta"	Melanie Mayron	Libby Wells	June 25, 2021	0.23
A recently divorced Fletcher reappears, wanting to get back together with Sam. Blake and Dominique turn up the pressure on Alexis with a fake lawsuit, and convince her that the Manor is sinking. Fallon goes head to head with her college nemesis Colin over the land she has purchased in Scotland. She plans to use incriminating photos as leverage against him, but changes her mind and finds another way to begin building on the site. Sam resists Fletcher's advances, but falls into bed with him after feeling neglected by Ryan. Alexis gives the Manor back to Blake, who subsequently reveals all he has done to turn the tables on her. Jeff and Michael both pursue Mia. Michael steps back to preserve his friendship with Jeff, but Mia kisses him and makes it clear she wants to date both men. Cristal confides in Adam that she has a brain tumor. Alexis confronts Dominique about her betrayal, and their catfight triggers a collapse that traps them in their mine.
73	9	"Equal Justice for the Rich"	Melanie Mayron	Bryce Schramm	July 2, 2021	0.20
Tensions are high between Alexis and Dominique as they remain trapped in the mine. Adam keeps Cristal's secret, but tells her that her tumor is stage 4 and seemingly inoperable. Jeff and Michael compete against each other for Mia's affections, but the escalation prompts her to break things off with both of them. Fallon hopes that SEC officer Corinne Simon will push through her paperwork for her company to go public. With their oxygen dwindling, Alexis and Dominique make peace with each other. Kirby's ex-boyfriend Oliver appears at La Mirage. Dominique admits that she is still married to her second husband, and Alexis confesses that she had an illegitimate daughter who is being raised by a relative in Europe. Liam's investigation into Corinne's connection to his father's insider trading scandal threatens Fallon's goals. Jeff and Michael rescue Alexis and Dominique. Cristal decides not to tell Blake about her condition yet. Corinne reveals her suspicion that Liam's father's accidental death was actually a murder.
74	10	"I Hate to Spoil Your Memories"	Ayoka Chenzira	Elaine Loh	July 16, 2021	0.26
Fallon tries to pressure Jeff into being a member on her board, then to locate a hacker that is pirating information from her company. Oliver continues to take Kirby down a road of modeling and cocaine abuse. Cristal puts off telling Blake about her tumor and lives in abandon with him, opting for high risk treatments. Adam and Anders both recognize that Kirby is in trouble, the latter connecting Oliver's agenda to Alexis. Sam loses Ryan, Fletcher, and his pending expansion deal in one fell swoop when everyone shows up at the same male strip club, but goes into business with Michael. Fallon recognizes how unfair she has been to Jeff in the past and apologizes to him. The hacker is revealed to be seeking intel on Liam and his investigation, not Fallon Unlimited.
75	11	"A Public Forum for Her Lies"	Jay Karas	Liz Sczudlo	July 23, 2021	0.25
Typical blackmail and deceit play into the family's current business dealings. Anders coerces Alexis to drop Oliver, which she does by destroying his camera and photo proofs. Sam and Michael's struggle to get in sync results in the hiring of corrupt contractors for La Mirage's extension. Adam shuts down medical care to an opposing doctor's relative until the hospital approves funding for clinical trials of a new drug for Cristal. Dominique learns her fashion line will not be showcased in a prestigious exhibit because of her age. Fallon turns from Blake's advice to lie to their investors and instead publicizes a recent bond with a young social influencer that advances the company's IPO. Blake, Alexis, Dominique, Kirby, and Oliver are all fired, broken up with, or cut off due to their twisted choices.
76	12	"Everything but Facing Reality"	Brandi Bradburn	Garrett Oakley	July 30, 2021	0.26
Liam returns to Atlanta obsessed with exposing the insider trading ring connected to his late father and Georgia's Senator North. Blake is distracted from his new airline when he finally learns of Cristal's illness. Dominique pleases Jeff when she turns down a lucrative offer for her fashion line in order to design more affordable clothes. Michael and Sam seem trapped into doing business with mob boss, Leo Abbott. Fallon and Liam infiltrate the senator's fundraiser (disguised as caterers) to obtain data on the securities fraud, but are shut down by North and his staff. Dom and Alexis threaten to reveal each others' personal secrets. Adam is encouraged by Cristal's medical results, even though she collapses. An unrelenting Liam sets a back alley meeting with informants only to be violently abducted by them.
77	13	"Go Rescue Someone Else"	Heather Tom	Josh Reims & Christopher Fife	August 6, 2021	0.25
An outdoor funeral is underway and there are many candidates for who is in the casket. Flashbacks play out: Liam and Fallon are held hostage by Lofflan, the senator's chief of staff and ringleader of the trading fraud; Anders dispatches the crooks with Secret Service panache, but is injured in the process; Abbott and his thug beat up Michael after he tries to offset their money-laundering scheme; Blake attempts to land his private jet when the pilot is disabled; Cristal requires immediate surgery; Jeff plans a dangerous ColbyCo venture into space; Kirby overdoses in a flophouse after Oliver bails. In the end, it is Anders who dies, distracted by pain in his ribs and losing control of his car. After his service, Fallon and Sam find Kirby barely alive.
78	14	"But I Don't Need Therapy"	Brandi Bradburn	Aubrey Villalobos Karr	August 13, 2021	0.33
Weeks after Anders's death, acceptance is in short supply. Kirby leaves the hospital in complete denial, falling off the wagon when she tries to model at the Designer Institute Ball. Blake is grateful for Cristal's recovery, but realizes he cannot build Primetime Private Air on the up and up. Adam co-opts Alzheimer's research at the hospital to create a dynasty of his own. Dominique and Jeff advise each other on far-fetched undertakings (hers in promotion; his with tech rival Nolan). Michael and Sam are eaten away by paranoia over Abbott's criminal activities. Fallon breaks down when she confronts her own sense of loss. Kirby finally visits her father's grave. After a heartfelt talk with Anders's spirit, she resolves to enter rehab and pull her life together.
79	15	"She Lives in a Showplace Penthouse"	Heather Tom	Katrina Cabrera Ortega	August 20, 2021	0.29
Fallon and Alexis vie for a penthouse in the exclusive Solitaire high-rise, sabotaging each other at every turn. Sam and Michael stage a desperate electrical accident to slow Abbott down. It backfires when the crime boss deduces their ploy. Dr. Adam steps in (guided by a warped sense of brotherhood) and lets a coding Abbott die in the hospital, freeing the La Mirage partners from the mob once and for all. Blake takes his turn being counseled by Anders's ghost to face off against Senator North over land rights. Dominique caters to Cristal's need for confidence while advancing the Deveraux fashion brand. Fallon relinquishes the suite when she realizes her mother only wants to live there to be closer to her and Adam. Blake announces a bid for Georgia's open senate seat.
80	16	"The British Are Coming"	Grant Show	David M. Israel	August 27, 2021	0.18
Touted acclaim for Liam's exposé does not extend to the Carringtons (including his wife) who are too absorbed by their own endeavors. Fallon seeks to quell competing offers for Dominique's line and land it on her own shopping network. Cristal chases down hundreds of signatures needed to secure Blake's entry in the senate race. Michael heeds Anders's other worldly criticism concerning a lack of guilt over Abbott's demise. Alexis is pursued around Atlanta by a young British blonde who turns out to be her secret daughter, Amanda (visiting to obtain answers about her true parentage). All comes to a head during Blake's press conference: Fallon and Adam react badly to learning of their new sister; Dom keeps business in the family; a stood-up Liam wins a journalism award and thoughtful attention from Fallon's attractive new assistant, Eva.
81	17	"Stars Make You Smile"	Michael A. Allowitz	Jason Ganzel	September 3, 2021	0.22
Amanda is impressive. She's an Oxford-educated attorney with little tolerance for manipulation. Blake suspects he may actually be her biological father and squares off against Alexis to confirm it. Jeff loses his cool during a podcast interview rather than admit to set-backs in ColbyCo's space race. Kirby's sobriety has her making too many amends to unreceptive Adam and not enough to Sam. Fallon is matched play by play in an attempted company takeover by a taunting Colin. Michael brainstorms use of offshore rigs to launch Jeff's rockets. Amanda has choice words for both "parents" when swiped DNA reveals her to be a Carrington. Neglected Liam is drawn closer to Eva - as Fallon is to Colin after she barely defeats his ingenious buyout.
82	18	"A Good Marriage in Every Sense"	Elizabeth Gillies	Bryce Schramm	September 10, 2021	0.26
Sibling relations test the family. Cristal's brother, Beto, resurfaces from Mexico to gain help incarcerating their racketeer father (and seduce Sam); Blake seeks Dominique's sway with Atlanta's black community to further his senatorial bid; Fallon and Adam ally to exploit claustrophobia and rumored dirt on Amanda that will send her packing. Elsewhere, flash drives from Anders lead Kirby to a dossier on the Carringtons, while Eva and Colin's ploys prompt the newlywed Ridleys to sleep in separate bedrooms. Dom brokers deals for Jeff and Michael to back Blake's campaign. Amanda's no-nonsense confession of having a career-damaging lesbian affair with a judge causes Fallon to call a humbled truce. Beto swears revenge when Cristal is put in charge of the Flores cartel.
83	19	"Everything Looks Wonderful, Joseph"	Brandon Lott	Libby Wells	September 17, 2021	0.25
Dominique's ex, Brady Lloyd, shows up at her studio. He explains he ran out years ago to protect her from his creditors and wins her back. Sam spins a reporter's scoop about Abbott's death, only to see the article rewritten as a hit piece on La Mirage. Adam tampers with a contract Amanda is drafting for Primetime Private Air but she turns the tables on him, joining his hospital's legal team. Fallon numbs her troubles with pot edibles creating a Capra-esque hallucination of the Carringtons if she had no ambition. Guided by Anders, she realizes that a simpler life may not be so wonderful. Jeff learns Dom and Brady never divorced; Blake and Amanda bond; Liam states he's the spouse who needs to change, not Fallon. He rides off, breaking her heart.
84	20	"You Vicious, Miserable Liar"	Robbie Countryman	Elaine Loh	September 24, 2021	0.30
Fallon jets to LA to meet with an acclaimed New Age marriage mediator (bringing along Sam to portray an absent Liam and Kirby for distraction). Enlightenment comes when she accepts Liam truly needs space away from her. Michael maneuvers Blake to make campaign promises giving aid to communities Carrington Atlantic has harmed. Jeff's neurotoxin symptoms return as he sells ColbyCo assets to fund Mars flights. Trials for Adam's new drug are stalled when Amanda finds liability issues for the hospital. Cristal intervenes on his behalf, fueling more fire for the siblings' feud. Eva gaslights the lie that Liam wants a divorce, causing Fallon to hook up with Colin for a hot night she will probably regret.
85	21	"Affairs of State and Affairs of the Heart"	Geoff Shotz	Liz Sczudlo	September 24, 2021	0.21
Adam is put on the spot when Dr. Larson, biochemist of the drug formula he plagiarized, comes back to claim the research. Colin advises Fallon to keep their tryst a secret, which proves difficult when she attends a couples retreat with Liam that includes blindfolded wall scaling and truth tents. Alexis is revealed to be in league with Brady to seize Dominique's business. Lt. Governor Lipnicki offers Blake the land for PPA's airfield if he drops out of the election. Kirby shares her diary of Carrington skeletons with Michael. Jeff is off his meds. Cristal plays on Blake's lust for power (planting rumors of a Presidential appointment) to keep him in the race. Fallon intends to come clean about Colin but Eva sees to it that Liam learns of the fling first. The tearful Ridleys seem to part for good.
86	22	"Filled with Manipulations and Deceptions"	Pascal Verschooris	Josh Reims & Garrett Oakley	October 1, 2021	0.22
The "Sahara Club Shootout" frames numerous Carrington cliffhangers. Fallon gets hip to Eva's schemes when Amanda helps uncover the assistant's history of stalking and obsession with Liam (followed by a knockdown brawl between employer and fired employee). Dr. Larson has an upper hand until Adam apparently throws him off a balcony. Jeff suffers a psychotic break and rampages after Brady. Blake and Cristal curb Beto's efforts to derail the senate race by moving the Flores empire to Atlanta. Alexis is jailed for Larson's murder in a red designer gown. Sam emulates Anders's calm demeanor and pulls off an impressive gala for Blake's campaign at the new club until Jeff, Beto, and Eva each show up uninvited with guns. A shot is fired. Fallon is struck by the bullet and falls into Liam's arms.

== Production ==
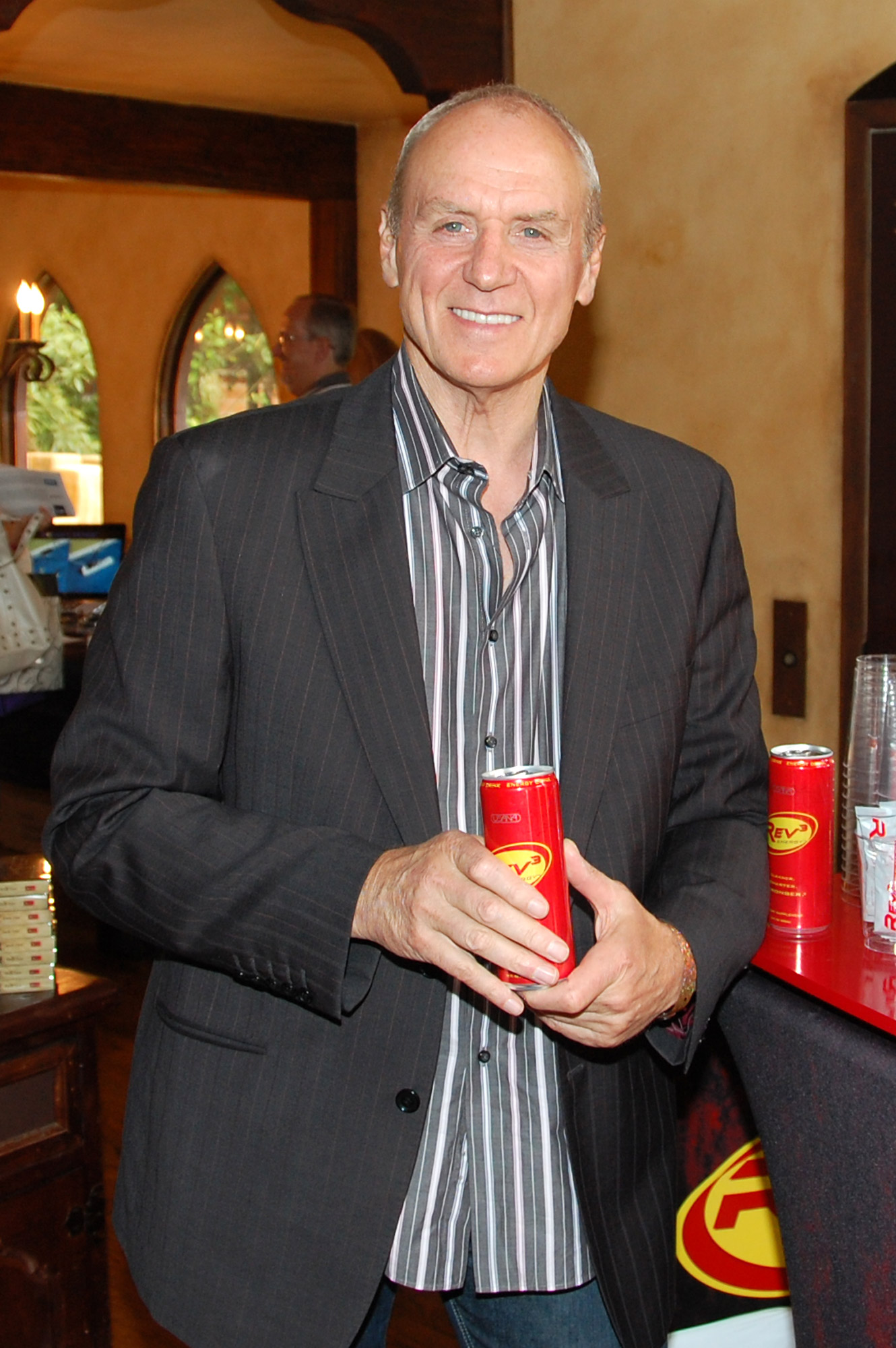
Original cast member Alan Dale was written off the series in season four.

=== Development ===
Dynasty was renewed for a fourth season on January 7, 2020.

Production of the third season was suspended in March 2020 as a direct result of the COVID-19 pandemic, and the filming of only 20 of the 22 ordered episodes of the season had been completed at that time. It was later confirmed that the 20th episode of the season, "My Hangover's Arrived", would serve as the season three finale. Showrunner Josh Reims, hoping to use reworked versions of the two unproduced scripts to start the fourth season, said in May 2020 these episodes feature Fallon and Liam's wedding; Blake going to war with Alexis, Jeff and Adam; Sam's new relationship with Ryan; and the return of the Moldavians.

It was reported that if production resumed by late fall 2020, season four would be expected to premiere in spring 2021 or later, and The CW's president Mark Pedowitz announced that all of the network's series would be producing "our normal episodic counts" for the post-pandemic season which indicates a full season of 22-24 episodes. Production on the fourth season officially began on October 15, 2020. On November 5, 2020, Daniella Alonso revealed on a podcast that she was pregnant with her first child; she further verified her real-life pregnancy would not be affecting Cristal's storyline in any capacity, and she would go on maternity leave a week prior to production shutting down for winter hiatus.

On February 3, 2021, ahead of its fourth season premiere, The CW renewed the series for a fifth season.

On April 28, 2021, Variety announced Elizabeth Gillies would make her directorial debut during the season. Grant Show directed the sixteenth episode of the season. On September 10, 2021, Gillies made her directorial debut with the eighteenth episode of the season.

On June 3, 2021, showrunner Josh Reims described the fourth season as a "rollercoaster ride" for Cristal, "She and Blake have to figure out how to move forward in their marriage after both cheated; her brother Beto will pay a surprise visit, upending her life and bringing out the dark side of Cristal once more; and in her biggest challenge yet, she has to deal with a medical situation that becomes much worse than anyone expected..."

=== Casting ===
Alonso had previously been the third Cristal cast in as many seasons. In May 2020, Reims confirmed that she would be back for season four, saying "I kind of wanted to do this thing—which I still might do—where we pretend at the beginning of the season that we're getting another new Cristal. But I don't want to scare Daniella. She's so great in the role, and I'm so excited that she's coming back." In February 2021, the casting of Luke Cook as Oliver, Kirby's Australian ex-boyfriend, was announced. The casting of Kara Royster as Fallon's new assistant, Eva, was announced in May 2021. In June 2021, showrunner Josh Reims revealed that Geovanni Gopradi would return as Cristal's brother, Beto. Michael Fairman also reported Laura Leighton's casting in the guest role of Corinne Simon, an SEC officer. Original cast member Dale's character Anders was killed off in the August 2021 episode "Go Rescue Someone Else", but the actor continues to appear on the series as a fantasy of other characters. The casting of Eliza Bennett as Alexis's secret daughter by Blake, Amanda Carrington, was announced in August 2021. NeNe Leakes appeared as a version of herself in the August 2021 episode "The British Are Coming".

== Broadcast ==
The fourth season of Dynasty premiered on May 7, 2021.

The season is also scheduled to stream on Netflix starting October 22, 2021.

== Reception ==
Viewership and ratings per episode of Dynasty
No.	Title	Air date	Rating (18–49)	Viewers (millions)	DVR (18–49)	DVR viewers (millions)	Total (18–49)	Total viewers (millions)
1	"That Unfortunate Dinner"	May 7, 2021	0.0	0.24	0.1	0.16	0.1	0.40
2	"Vows Are Still Sacred"	May 14, 2021	0.1	0.25	0.0	0.14	0.1	0.39
3	"The Aftermath"	May 21, 2021	0.0	0.24	0.0	0.16	0.1	0.40
4	"Everybody Loves the Carringtons"	May 28, 2021	0.1	0.19	0.0	0.15	0.1	0.34
5	"New Hopes, New Beginnings"	June 4, 2021	0.0	0.23	0.1	0.18	0.1	0.42
6	"A Little Father-Daughter Chat"	June 11, 2021	0.1	0.25	0.1	0.23	0.1	0.48
7	"The Birthday Party"	June 18, 2021	0.1	0.28	0.1	0.19	0.1	0.47
8	"Your Sick and Self-Serving Vendetta"	June 25, 2021	0.1	0.23	0.1	0.19	0.1	0.42
9	"Equal Justice for the Rich"	July 2, 2021	0.0	0.20	0.1	0.19	0.1	0.39
10	"I Hate to Spoil Your Memories"	July 16, 2021	0.0	0.26	0.1	0.18	0.1	0.44
11	"A Public Forum for Her Lies"	July 23, 2021	0.1	0.25	0.1	0.18	0.1	0.43
12	"Everything but Facing Reality"	July 30, 2021	0.0	0.26	0.1	0.20	0.1	0.46
13	"Go Rescue Someone Else"	August 6, 2021	0.0	0.25	0.1	0.17	0.1	0.41
14	"But I Don't Need Therapy"	August 13, 2021	0.1	0.33	0.1	0.20	0.1	0.54
15	"She Lives in a Showplace Penthouse"	August 20, 2021	0.0	0.29	0.1	0.16	0.1	0.45
16	"The British Are Coming"	August 27, 2021	0.0	0.18	TBD	TBD	TBD	TBD
17	"Stars Make You Smile"	September 3, 2021	0.0	0.22	TBD	TBD	TBD	TBD
18	"A Good Marriage in Every Sense"	September 10, 2021	0.1	0.26	TBD	TBD	TBD	TBD
19	"Everything Looks Wonderful, Joseph"	September 17, 2021	0.1	0.25	TBD	TBD	TBD	TBD
20	"You Vicious, Miserable Liar"	September 24, 2021	0.1	0.30	TBD	TBD	TBD	TBD
21	"Affairs of State and Affairs of the Heart"	September 24, 2021	0.0	0.21	TBD	TBD	TBD	TBD
22	"Filled With Manipulations and Deceptions"	October 1, 2021	0.0	0.22	TBD	TBD	TBD	TBD
