= Dex Dexter =

Fictional character from Dynasty

- Dynasty character
- Michael Nader as Farnsworth "Dex" Dexter
- Portrayed by: Michael Nader
- First appearance: "Dex" (1983)
- Last appearance: "Catch 22" (1989)
- Created by: Richard and Esther Shapiro
In-universe information
- Occupation: Owner and CEO of Dexter International; Partner in Lex-Dex Corporation; Former Green Beret
- Father: Sam Dexter
- Sisters: Marin Dexter
- Wife: Alexis Colby
- Grandparents: Farnsworth Dexter

Farnsworth "Dex" Dexter is a fictional character on the ABC prime time soap opera Dynasty. Portrayed by Michael Nader, the character was introduced as a love interest for Alexis Colby in the series' fourth season in 1983. He became her third husband, and arguably the second great love of her life, after Blake Carrington. Even after the end of their marriage, Dex remained a strong force in Alexis's life. Dex Dexter remained on the series until its final episode in 1989.

Nader did not reprise his role for the 1991 miniseries Dynasty: The Reunion, though the character was mentioned.

In 2022, Pej Vahdat was cast as Dex for the fifth season of the CW reboot series Dynasty.

== Original series ==
Michael Nader first appeared as Farnsworth "Dex" Dexter in season four of Dynasty in 1983. The character was soon paired with Alexis Colby (Joan Collins), and Nader remained on the series until its cancellation in 1989. Dex did not appear in the 1991 miniseries Dynasty: The Reunion.

Jon-Erik Hexum, who had previously starred opposite Collins in a film, was one of the five actors under final consideration for the role. Nader credited his chemistry with Collins with getting him the part. Collins said of Nader, "He's a very romantic leading man and he has a certain sinister edge." People noted in 1985 that Dex "was conceived as a minor and transitional character", but thanks to Nader, he "has turned into an unexpectedly popular one."

In 1985, Joe Klein of New York described Dex as a "multibillionaire-guerrilla-playboy-entrepreneur".

=== Storylines ===
==== Season 4 (1983–1984) ====
When ColbyCo abandons plans to acquire Denver-Carrington, board member Sam Dexter, an old friend of Blake Carrington's, sends his son, "Dex", to Denver to learn the reason. Dex and Blake's ex, Alexis Colby, are immediately drawn to each other. Although she resists, they soon become lovers. The relationship is tempestuous, breaking up at the end of the season.

==== Season 5 (1984–1985) ====
After Alexis is arrested for Mark Jennings' murder, Dex uncovers evidence that Senator Neal McVane is the true killer. He meets Alexis's daughter, Amanda Carrington, and has a love-hate rapport with her, which turns to passion when they are snowed in at a ski lodge. Realizing their mistake, they part and Dex marries Alexis. Businessman Daniel Reece recruits him to a paramilitary mission stemming from a shared experience in Vietnam. Dex returns suffering from a fever and, in delirium, calls out for Amanda arousing Alexis' suspicion. Amanda's wedding to Prince Michael of Moldavia complicates things further. Dex learns that rebels of the European monarchy are planning to attack the ceremony. As he struggles with the insurgents, a gun fires and he collapses surrounded by fallen Carringtons.

==== Season 6 (1985–1986) ====
Dex survives the attack and rescues Alexis and King Galen of Moldavia (who was held for ransom). Upon returning to Denver, he is driven closer to Amanda. They make love again - only to be caught in the act by Alexis. She flies to St Thomas for a quick divorce. Dex tries to reconcile but Alexis rejects him. He starts work on the Carrington-Colby pipeline.

==== Season 7 (1986–1987) ====
Dex agrees to help Blake against the plots of his brother, Ben Carrington. He and Clay Fallmont travel to Caracas to find Caress Morell, Alexis's sister, who has evidence clearing Blake. Dex then reconnects with Leslie Saunders, who turns out to be Ben's estranged daughter. His spark with Alexis reignites but is short-lived when he realizes she will always love Blake. He travels home to Wyoming and convinces a friend's grieving widow, Sarah Curtis, to donate her late daughter's heart to the Carringtons' ailing child, Krystina. At Adam Carrington's wedding, Dex attempts to stop another band of terrorists in the cliffhanger.

==== Season 8 (1987–1988) ====
Dex is shot breaking away from the guerrillas but makes a full recovery. He ends his fling with Leslie and goes to work for Alexis, growing suspicious of her nefarious new husband, Sean Rowan. He and Blake go to Africa where they discover Rowan's recent business dealings are a cover for illegal arms shipments. An exploding tanker and narrow escape later, Dex discovers Sean holding Alexis at gunpoint. The men grapple. A shot rings out.

==== Season 9 (1988–1989) ====
Dex is revealed to have killed Rowan and is exonerated. While trying to sort out the mess at ColbyCo, he finds himself in a romantic triangle with Alexis and her cousin, Sable Colby. He is also embroiled in the mystery of a flooded mine discovered on the Carrington estate that the Dexter family partly owned. Dex learns Sable is pregnant with his child, causing a chaotic encounter at the Carlton Hotel that sends him and Alexis falling off a balcony into cliffhanger abyss.

==== The Reunion (1991) ====
In 1991's Dynasty: The Reunion an older couple is standing in the Carrington mansion, talking about the fall Alexis and Dex made at the Carlton Hotel. Krystle, having just arrived and not knowing what's going on, listens to them and asks what and whom they are talking about. The woman tells her that Alexis managed to turn in mid-air and land on top of Dex. It is left unclear whether Dex survived the fall, as the woman continues that Dex "didn't fare as well" as Alexis did.

== Reboot ==
Dex Dexter
- Dynasty character
- Portrayed by: Pej Vahdat (2022)
- First appearance: "How Did the Board Meeting Go?" (2022)
- Last appearance: "Catch 22" (2022)
- Created by: Richard and Esther Shapiro
In-universe information
- Occupation: Hedge fund manager
- Father: Samir Dexter
- Wife: Alexis Colby
- Nephews: Timmy

In 2022, Pej Vahdat was cast as Dex for the fifth season of the CW reboot series Dynasty. He first appeared in the March 2022 episode "How Did the Board Meeting Go?".

=== Storylines ===
==== Season 5 (2021–2022) ====
In "How Did the Board Meeting Go?", Amanda Carrington (Eliza Bennett) realizes a drone that flies by her mother Alexis Colby's (Elaine Hendrix) penthouse nightly could have photographed the fatal fall of blackmailer Dr. Larson from the balcony (for which Alexis is on trial and in jail). It is tracked to the neighboring apartment of successful and charming hedge fund manager, Farnsworth "Dex" Dexter, (flown by his young nephew). Alexis is cleared of all charges when the drone's footage proves Larson's death was an accident. Dex then attends a Carrington gala and reveals that he and Alexis are already acquainted. His father, Samir Dexter (David Diaan), once sat on the board of Carrington Atlantic, so their friendship (and Dex's crush on her) goes back a few decades. By the following episode, Dex and Alexis have begun a passionate affair. They are married in "Vicious Vendetta", and their wedding is attended by enemies, exes, and estranged family on both sides. For the rest of the series, Dex remains blindly (and carnally) devoted to Alexis. Their sole conflict stems from the actions of her psychotic son, Adam (Sam Underwood). During the finale, Dex survives a plane crash. He is rescued in the wild Appalachians by his wife, her ex, Blake Carrington (Grant Show), and an extraction team. Dex swears eternal love to Alexis at the wreck site, still blissfully ignorant to her toxic past and crimes.
