= Geovanni Gopradi =

American actor and producer (born 1983)

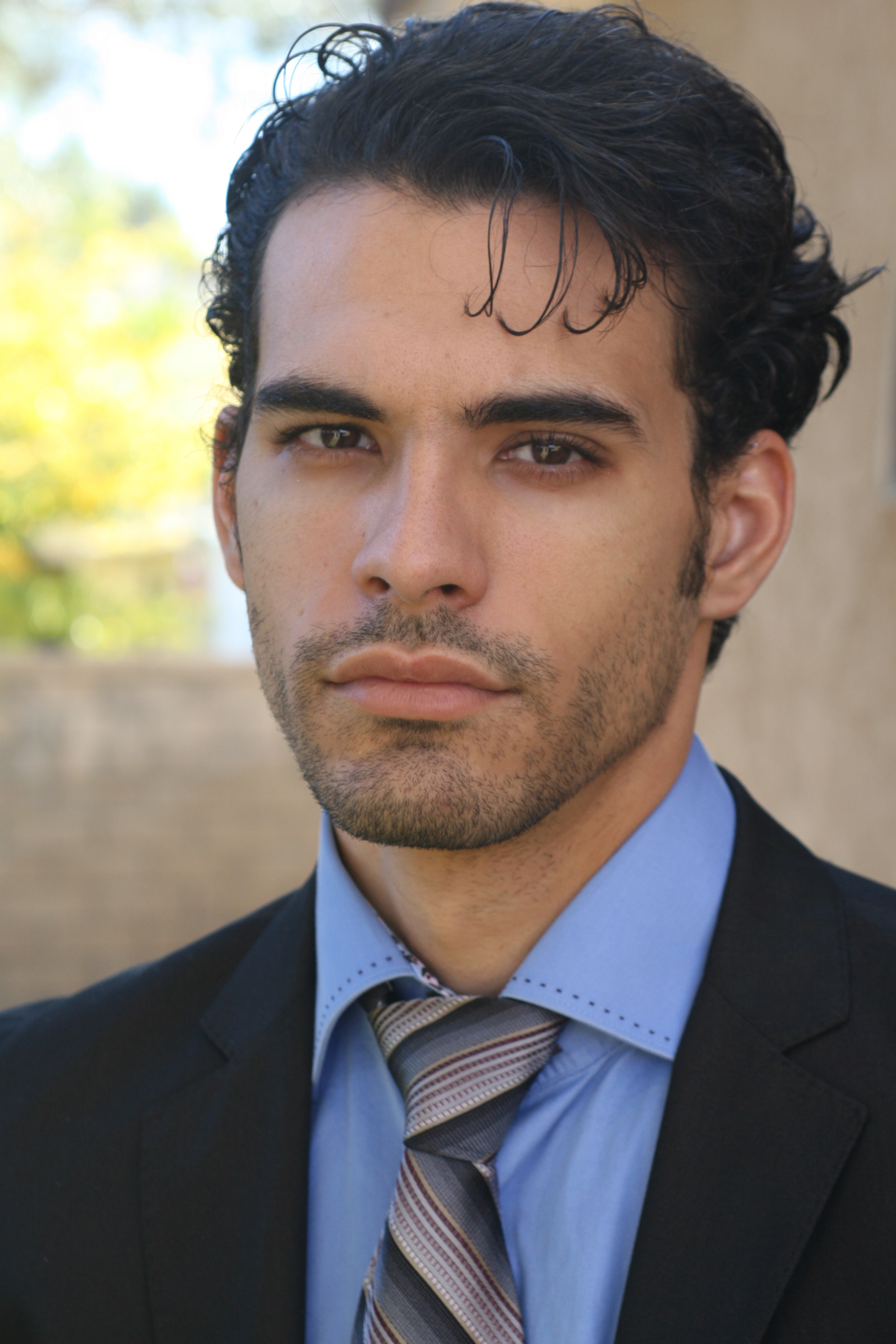
- Gopradi in November 2011
- Born: Geovannie Gomez; May 27, 1983 (age 41); Miami, Florida, U.S.
- Occupations: Actor; producer
- Years active: 2007–present

Geovannie Gomez (born May 27, 1983), known professionally as Geovanni Gopradi, is an American actor and producer.

== Early life ==
Gopradi was born in Miami, Florida.

== Career ==
During 2005, Gopradi decided to enroll in acting classes while he was attending college to overcome his fear of public speaking. After his first performance as Jerry in the play The Zoo Story, he decided to take acting professionally. Gopradi landed his first lead role in a 2006 short film The Options, followed by the character Rodriguez in Lost Everything. He also appeared on the television series Viva Hollywood, which aired on VH1. In 2007 he began filming a comedy Spanish Woman's Guide to Finding a Good Man, his work called the attention of NBC Telemundo and was cast in the Spanish soap opera Pecados Ajenos, but the big screen kept calling his attention so Gopradi began filming La Mujer de La Noche and was cast for Jarring, his first horror lead role.

Gopradi's first role in a big-budget production was in the 2015 comedy Paul Blart: Mall Cop 2. He made his TV debut in an episode of the HBO series True Blood followed by roles in the TNT TV series Major Crimes, the ABC TV series Presence, the romantic comedy Heterosexual Jill, and the drama Clarity.

While in New York, Gopradi broadened his acting performing ten plays between off and off-off broadway from 2009 to 2011, as well as co-starring in short film Grown Ups and as the murdering gang member in the feature The Southside to be released in 2012 among others.

In 2018, Gopradi played Alejandro in the Will & Grace episode "Three Wise Men", and since that year has played Broderick on The Haves and the Have Nots. Gopradi has played the recurring role of Roberto Flores in The CW's Dynasty reboot since 2019.

== Personal life ==
Gopradi became the Special Olympics 2015 ambassador and torch bearer for the Historic Unified Relay Across America As well as a strong supporter of Lucy Meyer, the Official Spokesperson of the Special Olympics- U.S. Fund for UNICEF U.S. Fund's and Spokesperson for Children with Disabilities and a Special Olympics swimmer.
