= Monica Colby =

Fictional character

- Dynasty and The Colbys character
- Tracy Scoggins as Monica Colby
- Portrayed by: Tracy Scoggins
- Duration: 1985–1987, 1989
- First appearance: "The Titans - Part 1" (1985)
- Last appearance: "Catch 22" (1989)
- Created by: Richard and Esther Shapiro
- Spin-off appearances: The Colbys
In-universe information
- Occupation: Lawyer
- Mother: Sable Scott Colby
- Stepfather: Jason Colby
- Siblings: Miles Colby; Bliss Colby
- Children: Scott Cassidy
- Uncles: Cecil Colby; Philip Colby
- Aunts: Constance Colby; Francesca Scott Colby
- First cousins: Jeff Colby

Monica Scott Colby is a fictional character from the ABC television series Dynasty and its spin-off The Colbys, both created by Richard and Esther Shapiro. Portrayed by Tracy Scoggins, the character was introduced on Dynasty in the November 1985 two-part episode "The Titans" as the lawyer daughter of wealthy California CEO Jason Colby (Charlton Heston) and his socialite wife, Sable (Stephanie Beacham). Scoggins was subsequently a series regular on The Colbys for two seasons from 1985 to 1987. She reappeared as Monica on Dynasty for its final eight episodes in 1989.

In The CW's 2017 Dynasty reboot, Monica is portrayed by Wakeema Hollis. In this series, Monica is the sister of Jeff Colby (Sam Adegoke) and the daughter of Cesil Colby (Hakeem Kae-Kazim) and Dominique Deveraux (Michael Michele), who is the half-sister of Blake Carrington (Grant Show).

== Appearances ==
Scoggins debuted as Monica in the Dynasty episodes "The Titans - Part 1" and "The Titans - Part 2", which aired back-to-back on November 13, 1985. She subsequently appeared as a series regular on The Colbys, which ran for two seasons from November 20, 1985, to March 26, 1987. Scoggins later played Monica in the ninth and final season of Dynasty, joining the series for its eight final installments beginning with the March 16, 1989 episode "The Son Also Rises" and remaining until Dynasty's finale episode "Catch 22" on May 11, 1989. Monica did not appear in the 1991 miniseries Dynasty: The Reunion.

Hollis began playing Monica in "I Hardly Recognized You", the October 11, 2017 premiere episode of the Dynasty reboot series. The character is one of several cast as nonwhite for the reboot.

== Original series and The Colbys ==
At the height of Dynasty's popularity, its creators Richard and Esther Shapiro devised a spin-off series, initially called Dynasty II: The Colbys. Tracy Scoggins starred as Monica Colby, the lawyer daughter of wealthy CEO Jason Colby and his socialite wife, Sable.

=== Casting ===
Scoggins said that she auditioned along with "every woman in LA and New York between the ages of 25 and 30." It was down to about six actresses when Scoggins screen tested with Maxwell Caulfield, who plays Monica's twin brother, Miles. She was offered the role a week later.

=== Characterization ===
The Desert Sun described Monica as a lawyer "determined to make it in a man's world [who] can't understand the inequalities that confront her." DVD Talk called the character "Colby Enterprises' chief counsel and all-around shark". Scoggins said:

Monica is what I think is one of the most admirable prototypes on television. She's an achiever, well-educated, at home in the world of business, competent, a loving daughter and a nurturing friend. Usually, when someone's as successful as Monica, she's portrayed as bitchy. It's a fine line in real life to be that successful and retain your femininity. Monica's fatal character flaw is her poor choice in men. We see that in women of the 80s. They may be fantastic in the board room, but they can't seem to get it together in the bedroom.

=== Storylines ===
==== Dynasty season six ====
The Colbys of Los Angeles come to Denver to celebrate a new business venture with oil tycoon Blake Carrington (John Forsythe) in the 1985 Dynasty episodes "The Titans - Parts 1 and 2". The lawyer daughter of Jason and Sable Colby, Monica is the twin sister of Miles Colby (Maxwell Caulfield), who has become romantically involved with an amnesiac Fallon Carrington (Emma Samms). Miles and Monica also have a younger sister, Bliss (Claire Yarlett).

==== The Colbys season one ====
In The Colbys, Monica is a lawyer working for her father Jason's company, Colby Enterprises. In the series premiere, "The Celebration", she offers to investigate who is behind detrimental rumors which are plaguing the company, but Jason dismisses her. An angry Monica complains to Sable, who tells Monica that it is unlikely Jason will ever treat her like he would a man. In "Conspiracy of Silence", Monica warns Miles that things will likely change between him and Fallon if she gets her memory back. Monica tries to convince her cousin Jeff Colby (John James) to let his ex-wife Fallon go, since she and Miles are in love, in "Moment of Truth". Monica offers to help Jason again in "Family Album", but is forced to accept that her father only takes men seriously. Blake Carrington's half-sister, Dominique Deveraux (Diahann Carroll), asks Monica to help her learn if Jason is the one buying up stock in her company, Titania Records. Monica learns that Dominique's ex-lover, Garrett Boydston (Ken Howard), bought the stock. Dominique offers Monica a job leading her company. Feeling unappreciated, Monica quits Colby Enterprises to manage Titania in "Shadow of the Past". Jason is hurt, but Monica is sick of being treated like a decoration rather than a valued employee. In accepting the job, Monica has run afoul of Titania vice president Neil Kittredge (Philip Brown), who was demoted to make way for her. Dominique is annoyed to find Monica and Neil clashing at work in "The Reunion".

Worried about Constance, Monica confronts Hutch, who has no idea that Constance is wealthy and breaks things off with her. Monica is doubtful in "Fallen Idol" when Miles tells her he witnessed Jason in a romantic embrace with Jeff's mother and Sable's sister, Francesca (Katharine Ross). Monica apologizes to Constance for interfering with Hutch in "Fallen Idol", and goes to Hutch to ask that he reconcile with Constance. Monica meets blind singer Wayne Masterson (Gary Morris) and pitches him to Neil, which leads to another argument between them. Monica and Neil get closer in "The Letter", as she and Wayne begin working together. Neil apologizes to Monica in "The Turning Point". They fly to San Francisco for dinner, and end up spending the night together. Thanks to Monica, Hutch reconciles with a recovering Constance in "Thursday's Child". Neil is jealous of Monica's relationship with Wayne. In "The Pact", Monica learns from Dominique that Neil is married. In "Fallon's Choice", Monica tries to talk Miles out of renewing his pursuit of Fallon, who has moved on with Jeff. When Neil complains about her closeness to Wayne, Monica explodes with her discovery that Neil has a wife. As Wayne prepares to have an operation that could restore his sight, Monica fires Neil in "The Trial".

In "Burden of Proof", Jason reveals in court that he is Jeff's father, making Jeff the half-brother of Monica, Miles, and Bliss. With Jeff and Fallon planning to marry in Los Angeles, Monica is worried when Miles refuses to get away to New York in "My Father's House". She works out her argument with Wayne. Dominique compels Monica to rehire Neil in "The Outcast". When Miles is arrested for murder, Monica tells Wayne in "The Honeymoon" that she cannot be with him when he has his surgery. Monica laments to Sable that Miles seems to be pushing her away. Monica and Neil resume their affair in "Double Jeopardy", and he tells her he is going to ask his wife for a divorce. After visiting Miles in jail, Monica is worried he is hiding something. In "A Family Affair", Constance asks Monica about the relevance of audio tapes in court. Miles confides in Monica that he cannot be sure whether he committed the murder or not, but she believes him incapable of murder. She helps him try to regain his memories in "The Reckoning", and worries when he vanishes and appears to jump bail. Wayne tells Monica that he can see again. In "Anniversary Waltz", Neil reassures Monica that he will divorce his wife, and gives her a key to his apartment. Wayne leaves Titania Records and Los Angeles when he realizes what is going on between Monica and Neil. Monica catches Neil in bed with his wife in the season finale "Checkmate". Devastated, she flees by plane, only to crash in the mountains.

==== The Colbys season two ====
Monica has survived the plane crash in the season two premiere "The Gathering Storm". Dominique tells Monica of her intent to sell Titania Records in "No Exit". Dominique sells Titania Records and her hotel to Jason's enemy, Zach Powers (Ricardo Montalbán), prompting Monica to quit in "Jason's Choice". When Jason throws Sable out of the mansion and she collapses, Monica and her siblings convince Jason to allow their mother to stay. In "The Matchmaker", Jason is angry with Monica that he had to hear about her plane crash from his insurance agent. Not ready to talk about Neil, Monica is pleasantly surprised when Jason asks her to come back as General Counsel of Colby Enterprises. Finally feeling appreciated, she accepts. In "Something Old, Something New", Monica opens up to Jason about Neil, and explains that she was unhappily involved with another married man in the past. Jason is compelled to work with Senator Cash Cassidy (James Houghton), the son of an old business rival, as Jason's government liaison for a proposed space satellite project. Monica is thrown when Cash comes to Sable's party, as Cash is the married man with whom Monica had an affair in college. Though he had previously ended their relationship to preserve his political career, Cash wants to reconnect in "The Gala". Monica rebuffs him, insisting it is over between them. She tells her father she does not want to work with Cash, but Jason forces the issue. Monica waffles when Cash asks her why she left him eight years ago. As Jason warns Cash away from Monica, she goes to Arthur, fearful that Cash will discover that she had his child. In "Bloodlines", Jason wants Cash off the project, but Monica does not want him removed because of her. Cash is grateful for her support, but Cash's wife Adrienne (Shanna Reed) warns Monica that she will fight hard to keep her husband. Monica insists that her relationship with Cash is long dead. Cash confesses that he still loves Monica in "Deceptions", but she rejects him. He is persistent, and insists that his marriage has fallen apart. With Monica's resistance losing strength, Miles advises her to protect her own interests.

In "And Baby Makes Four", Monica meets and befriends Scott, (Coleby Lombardo), Cash's young son with his wife Adrienne, not realizing that he is the child Monica conceived with Cash and put up for adoption. Adrienne forbids Cash from ever telling Monica the truth, reminding him that she only agreed to adopt her rival's baby because Constance threatened to have Cash removed from the Senate. When Cash spends time with Scott and Monica in "Bid for Freedom", Adrienne goes to Jason to remove Cash from the project, but Jason refuses to interfere in personal matters. Cash almost tells Monica the truth. Zach confronts Cash in "Reaching Out", threatening to reveal Scott's true parentage to Monica unless Cash spies for him. Cash refuses, deciding to tell Monica himself. Before he is able to, Adrienne confronts Monica and inadvertently says something that makes Monica suspicious. When Arthur is unable to tell her what happened to her son, Monica calls Constance, who confirms that Scott is indeed her child. When Cash arrives to confess, Monica scorns him for not telling her sooner and sends him away. While Monica's discovery gives her nightmares in "Sanctuary", Zach tells Sable that Monica is Scott's mother. Sable advises Monica not to tell Jason yet. In "Power Plays", Sable goes behind Monica's back and tries to convince Adrienne to give up Scott as a means to give Jason his first grandchild. Adrienne refuses and lashes out at Monica, who warns an indignant Sable to stay out of her private life. Cash tells Monica he wants her to make a family with him and Scott. In "The Legacy", Cash and Adrienne's marriage is collapsing, and an intoxicated Adrienne tells Scott it is Monica's fault. Monica is thrown when an angry Scott appears at her office and returns the magazines she gave him. Sable suggests that Monica tell Jason the truth about Scott in "The Home Wrecker", but Monica recognizes her mother's self-serving motives and forbids Sable from telling Jason. Cash decides to leave Adrienne and marry Monica. She declines for Scott's sake, but Scott runs away from home. Adrienne goes to the Colby mansion and tells Jason and Frankie that Monica's son Scott is missing. In "The Manhunt", Monica and Cash arrive at the Colby mansion and learn that Scott is missing and Jason knows about him. Monica guesses correctly that Scott is at the observatory, but when they find him he says he hates Monica. Adrienne promises Cash that he will lose Scott if he leaves her. Sable tries to convince Cash and Monica that Scott will be better off away from Adrienne, who has had addiction issues and made suicide attempts.

Cash takes a bullet meant for Jason. Cash is in critical condition in "All Fall Down", and while he is in surgery Scott tells Monica that he did not mean it when he said he hated her. A recovering Cash asks for Monica, who is relieved he survived. She and Sable finally discuss Monica's pregnancy and Scott's birth in "Guilty Party". In "Fallon's Baby", Adrienne tells Cash that she is taking Scott back to Washington, but Cash and Monica again refuse Sable's interference. Scott blames himself for the failure of Cash and Adrienne's marriage. Cash tries to disabuse him of this notion, but ultimately tells Monica they cannot be together because he does not want to hurt Scott. In "Answered Prayers", Monica and Miles are worried that Sable plans to marry Zach. Monica is happy for Jason and Frankie that they are getting married, but sad about her hopeless situation with Cash. In "Return Engagement", Monica inadvertently stops Sable from marrying Zach with the news that presumed-dead Philip Colby (Michael Parks), Frankie's ex-husband and Jeff's father, has returned. Zach, spurned again by Sable, suggests to Adrienne that they help each other with their problems. Monica confronts Adrienne about her connection to Zach in "Devil's Advocate", Scott overhears, and learns that Monica is his mother. Monica hears Philip speaking Chinese to someone on the phone to whom he owes $2 million. Understanding everything, Monica informs Jason. In "Betrayals", Monica feels terrible about how Scott found out he is her son. Cash tells her that Zach tried to blackmail him about Scott, and Monica informs Sable, who is furious. Scott declares his loyalty to Adrienne, who tells Sable she is leaving town with Scott to get him away from the Colbys. Adrienne tells Cash he can have a divorce but not Scott, assuring him that a messy trial would hurt the satellite project as well as his and Monica's reputations. Monica realizes that the only way to give Scott a stable home is to end her relationship with Cash. Lucas Carter (Kevin McCarthy), the publisher uncle of Miles's wife Channing (Kim Morgan Greene), offers to keep Cash and Monica's affair out of his newspaper in exchange for Jason dropping his lawsuit against Lucas in "The Dead End". In the series finale "Crossroads", Cash is leaving for Washington with Scott and Adrienne. Scott tells a heartbroken Monica that he is glad she is his mother, as a pained Sable watches. Sable suggests that Monica sue the Cassidys but Monica rejects the idea, only wanting Scott to be happy. Sable picks up Scott from school without the Cassidys' consent and persuades him to come with her.

==== Dynasty season nine ====
Monica visits her mother Sable, who has relocated to Denver, in "The Son Also Rises". Sable convinces Monica to stay and help her with her campaign to destroy her cousin Alexis, Fallon's mother. In "Grimes and Punishment", Monica tries to persuade Jeff to take Sable's side in the impending war between Alexis and Sable. In "Here Comes the Son", Blake's son Adam Carrington (Gordon Thomson) retouches a photograph of half-siblings Jeff and Monica to appear as if their relationship may be incestuous. In "Blasts from the Past", Jeff attacks Adam after discovering he was responsible for the photo, prompting Alexis to reveal in front of Sable and Monica that Jason is not Miles or Monica's father. Sable confides in Blake that twins Miles and Monica were the products of rape.

== Reboot series ==
Monica Colby
- Dynasty character
- Wakeema Hollis as Monica Colby
- Portrayed by: Wakeema Hollis
- Duration: 2017–2019, 2021
- First appearance: "I Hardly Recognized You" (2017)
- Last appearance: "New Hopes, New Beginnings" (2021)
- Created by: Sallie Patrick; Richard and Esther Shapiro
In-universe information
- Occupation: Owner of Club Colby
- Father: Cesil Colby
- Mother: Dominique Deveraux
- Stepfather: Brady Lloyd
- Brothers: Jeff Colby
- Sisters: Vanessa Deveraux (stepsister)
- Uncles: Blake Carrington; Benjamin Carrington
- First cousins: Adam Carrington; Steven Carrington; Fallon Carrington; Amanda Carrington; Juliette Carrington

A Dynasty reboot series premiered on The CW on October 11, 2017, featuring Wakeema Hollis as Monica. In this series, Monica is the sister of Jeff Colby (Sam Adegoke) and the daughter of Cesil Colby (Hakeem Kae-Kazim) and Dominique Deveraux (Michael Michele), who is the half-sister of Blake Carrington (Grant Show). The Colbys are newly wealthy, and executive producer Sallie Patrick said that setting them up as competition for the Carringtons would help the show to explore race, class, and gender issues.

=== Casting ===
Hollis was cast as Monica the same week she landed the recurring role of makeup salesgirl Harriet on The Marvelous Mrs. Maisel. She said that though both roles are different, they both represent strong female storylines. Hollis worked on the first seasons of both Dynasty and Mrs. Maisel concurrently.

=== Characterization ===
Delia Harrington of Den of Geek wrote early in season one that "Unfortunately, Monica's only qualities so far fall squarely in the black best friend trope". Monica and Fallon's long friendship has its problems, and Monica calls out what she perceives as Fallon's "subtle racism"; makes it clear that she does not exist merely to make Fallon feel better; and laments that Fallon's overtures of friendship are often self-serving. Fallon using Monica's strained relationship with her imprisoned father as a means to meet with the warden about an energy contract pushes Monica to the edge. She tells Fallon off, and then pursues Fallon's ex-boyfriend Michael. Harrington hoped that Monica's relationship with Michael would "pull her more centrally into the story." Andrea Reiher of Brit + Co called Monica "far more devious than anybody knew" when she pretends to oppose Jeff in "Promises You Can't Keep" but is really looking for revenge against the Carringtons for her family falling apart in her youth. Harrington notes that, until "Nothing but Trouble", Monica and the Colbys "generally had the moral high ground", and Monica seemed to genuinely care for Fallon and felt bad for manipulating her. Harrington called Monica "the most likely to eventually turn on Jeff and help (or at least tip off) Culhane or Fallon." Harrington wrote that Monica remains "the most reasonable" of the Colbys in "Poor Little Rich Girl" as she reaches her limit with Jeff, taking over guardianship of her father and calling out Jeff on the selfishness of his crusade against the Carringtons. She also tells Jeff not to play the victim, since his own machinations blew up in his face.

When Monica sabotages Dominique's visit to Atlanta in "The Sight of You", Reed Gaudens of Hidden Remote wrote, "Finally, Dynasty gives Monica something juicer to do other than bickering with Fallon or playing second fiddle to Jeff. Let's hope that with her delicious display of manipulation, we're going to continue to see a devious but also vulnerable side of Monica." Monica is still holding a grudge against her mother for abandoning their family when Dominique returns in "New Lady in Town", but Jeff manages to broker a truce.

Monica steps up in "Wild Ghost Chase" and looks into the lack of progress in the investigation of Jeff's disappearance. She comes to the brink of discovering her mother's duplicity, and Dominique drugs her to delay her investigation, but Gaudens notes that "Monica's too smart. She brings Jeff back, and they kick Dominique out." In "Shoot from the Hip", Vanessa disobeys Dominique and tells Monica they are sisters because she sees that Monica is a good person being deceived by their mother.

=== Storylines ===
==== Season one ====
Jeff Colby's sister Monica is introduced in the series premiere "I Hardly Recognized You" as the best friend since high school of Fallon Carrington (Elizabeth Gillies). In "A Taste of Your Own Medicine", it is established that the Colbys' father, Cesil, is in jail. Monica refuses Fallon's urging to visit him in "Rotten Things", and is mad to discover that Fallon is sleeping with her brother Jeff while still harboring feelings for Michael Culhane (Robert Christopher Riley). The women have a falling out as Monica accuses Fallon of being self-absorbed and not a good friend. Monica then begins a romantic relationship with Michael. Monica is horrified when Jeff finally admits his plan to destroy the Carringtons in "Promises You Can't Keep", but she later agrees to help him. Fallon later discovers that the Colbys are conspiring against her in "Nothing but Trouble". In "Our Turn Now", she makes a show of her trust in Monica to encourage a confession, but Monica stays silent. As Jeff and Fallon's feud goes public in "Poor Little Rich Girl", Monica cuts ties with Jeff and takes guardianship of a released Cesil. Fallon's mother Alexis Carrington (Nicollette Sheridan) arranges a reconciliation between Jeff and Monica in "A Line from the Past". In "Trashy Little Tramp", Jeff and Monica learn from their grandmother—the former secretary of Thomas Carrington (Bill Smitrovich)—that their mother, Millie, was fathered by Thomas. Alexis informs them that as Thomas' grandchildren, they are entitled to a portion of his shares in Carrington Atlantic. Jeff and Monica reveal their Carrington heritage in "Dead Scratch", and declare their intention to force a sale of the company.

==== Season two ====
In season two, Monica reluctantly hires Kirby Anders (Maddison Brown) to help her open Club Colby in "Ship of Vipers". In "A Temporary Infestation", Fallon and Monica's new business venture threatens Jeff and Michael's secret connection to the devious Ada Stone (Katherine LaNasa). Jeff invites his mother Dominique Deveraux to Atlanta for a reunion in "The Sight of You". Monica, still furious over their mother's abandonment, calls Dominique and tells her not to come. Jeff is disappointed when she does not arrive, or even call. Dominique (Michael Michele) reappears in "New Lady in Town" as Jeff recovers at home. She and Monica clash over Dominique's abandonment, and though Dominique is apologetic, she asserts that Jeff and Monica were better off being raised by their grandmother. Dominique takes a secret phone call, revealing that she has been manipulating Jeff and Monica, and that she has other children in New York. Monica is vaguely supportive in "Deception, Jealousy, and Lies" when Jeff and Dominique plot to frame Adam (Sam Underwood) for Jeff's "murder".

==== Season three ====
In season three, Monica comes close to learning that Dominique double-crossed Jeff in "Wild Ghost Chase", so Dominique drugs her daughter to delay her investigation while Dominique makes a play to gain control of an absent Jeff's money. Jeff returns, and he and Monica cut ties with Dominique for her machinations. In "Something Desperate", Jeff and Monica are shocked as Dominique claims responsibility for the explosion that injured Adam Carrington (Sam Underwood). Dominique's stepdaughter Vanessa Deveraux (Jade Payton) arrives in Atlanta in "Mother? I'm at La Mirage", but Dominique wants to keep Vanessa's identity hidden from Jeff and Monica until she can secure their help for Vanessa's singing career. Monica softens to Dominique in "Shoot from the Hip", agreeing to sign Vanessa to her label and have Dominique and Vanessa over for Thanksgiving. Michael pressures Dominique to tell Jeff and Monica that Vanessa is their step-sister. Dominique convinces Blake to give her incriminating information on Michael, which she uses to silence him. Angry that Dominique is perpetuating the lie and has no intention of confessing, Vanessa reveals to a furious Monica that they are sisters. In "The Sensational Blake Carrington Trial", Monica decides to go to New York to open another Club Colby, and invites Vanessa to go with her.

==== Season four ====
In season four, Monica returns to Atlanta in "New Hopes, New Beginnings" for the funeral of her grandmother, Dominique's mother. Dominique's heartfelt eulogy and promises to be a better mother begin to thaw her icy relationship with Jeff and Monica.

=== Reception ===
Gaudens noted early in season three that Hollis was not a series regular "but seriously should be".
