= Sable Colby =

- Dynasty and The Colbys character
- Portrayed by: Stephanie Beacham
- Duration: 1985–1989
- First appearance: "The Titans - Part 1" (1985)
- Last appearance: "Catch 22" (1989)
- Created by: Richard and Esther Shapiro
- Spin-off appearances: The Colbys
In-universe information
- Other names: Sabella Scott Colby
- Occupation: Socialite; Businesswoman
- Sisters: Francesca Scott Colby
- Spouse: Jason Colby
- Children: Miles Colby; Monica Colby; Bliss Colby
- Grandsons: Scott Cassidy
- Nephews: Jeff Colby
- First cousins: Alexis Colby; Caress Morell; Rosalind Bedford

Sabella "Sable" Scott Colby is a fictional character from the ABC television series Dynasty and its spin-off The Colbys, both created by Richard and Esther Shapiro. Portrayed by Stephanie Beacham, the character was introduced on Dynasty in the November 1985 two-part episode "The Titans" as the socialite wife of wealthy California CEO Jason Colby (Charlton Heston). Beacham was subsequently a series regular on The Colbys for two seasons from 1985 to 1987. She reappeared as Sable on Dynasty for its ninth and final season from 1988 to 1989.

== Development and casting ==
In March 1985, ABC announced that its rumored Dynasty spin-off, The Colbys, had been greenlighted, to debut the following season. Charlton Heston was cast as patriarch Jason Colby in July 1985, and it was reported that The Colbys' versions of Dynasty rivals Krystle Carrington (Linda Evans) and Alexis Colby (Joan Collins) would be named Anthea (later changed to Francesca) and Sable. Faye Dunaway, Angie Dickinson, Elizabeth Ashley, and Diana Rigg all turned down the role of Jason's wife Sable. Producers started auditioning British actresses to play one of the sisters as the equivalent of Collins's Alexis. According to Kate O'Mara, she and Stephanie Beacham were the final two choices to play Sable, but O'Mara was already under contract with a stage play in London. O'Mara later played Caress Morell, the sister of Collins' character Alexis, on Dynasty. In August 1985, producers cast Beacham, "a household name" in the UK who had starred in the title role of the ITV drama Connie.

On vacation after playing a ruthless businesswoman on Connie, Beacham almost passed on the request that she return to London to screen test for The Colbys. She was compelled to return when her housesitter locked the keys in her home. Beacham tested on a Friday, was flown to Los Angeles a week later, and was in wardrobe the next day. She noted of her audition, "I said whatever rubbish I could remember and camped it up". Beacham later explained that her main reason for doing The Colbys was her pay, which was an estimated $20,000 per episode. Beacham said that she and Heston were "a very lovely team", and that "What was really flattering actually was that the crew always used to gather around to watch the first run-through of our scenes, not just because they had to." Beacham is completely deaf in her right ear and has only 70 percent hearing in her left, and she compensates by positioning herself to the right of other actors in as many scenes as possible.

== Appearances ==
Beacham debuted as Sable in the Dynasty episodes "The Titans - Part 1" and "The Titans - Part 2", which aired back-to-back on November 13, 1985. She subsequently appeared as a series regular on The Colbys, which ran for two seasons from November 20, 1985, to March 26, 1987. Beacham later played Sable in the ninth and final season of Dynasty from 1988 to 1989. Sable did not appear in the 1991 miniseries Dynasty: The Reunion.

== Characterization ==
Jasper Rees of The Telegraph wrote in 2016 that "Stephanie Beacham will forever be known as blow-dried, shoulder-padded vamp Sable Colby". Barbara Holsopple of The Pittsburgh Press called Sable "scheming" and "smarmy", noting that Jason's wife is ruffled by his sister Constance Colby's (Barbara Stanwyck) bestowal of her company shares on her nephew Jeff (John James) rather than to Jason and Sable's three children. David Wallace of People described Sable as "wily", and recounted how Sable deals with Constance by first trying to have her declared incompetent and then by sabotaging her horse's saddle. Dynasty co-creator Esther Shapiro said of Beacham, "We loved her patrician quality. Despite Sable's seamy side, you understand why a major tycoon would stay married to her." Wallace dubbed Beacham "the show's real fire", and wrote that she "might just be the one to show Joan Collins the real meaning of she-deviltry." In February 1986, Beacham said that a confrontation between Sable and her cousin Alexis (Collins) might be "jolly good fun." Beacham commented in 2012 that she and Collins "felt we represented the Eighties."

Beacham said of Sable, "When she gets cross, frightful things can happen...I've allowed Sable to get more and more neurotic...she's such a terror." Beacham agreed it could be a challenge playing someone with so much emotion, but called Sable "a nearly three-dimensional human being".

== Storylines ==
=== Dynasty season six ===
The Colbys of Los Angeles come to Denver to celebrate a new business venture with oil tycoon Blake Carrington (John Forsythe) in the 1985 Dynasty episodes "The Titans - Parts 1 and 2". Sable is married to mogul Jason Colby, and the mother of their three children: Miles (Maxwell Caulfield), Monica (Tracy Scoggins), and Bliss (Claire Yarlett).

=== The Colbys season one ===
In the series premiere, "The Celebration", the Colbys return to Los Angeles and Sable is upset that Jason's sister Constance has given her shares to her nephew Jeff rather than Sable and Jason's three children. A dismissive Jason tells Sable to stay out of it, but she makes a failed attempt to convince Constance that she has made a mistake. Sable is getting worried that no one has heard from Miles, and also tells Monica that it is unlikely Jason will ever treat her like he would a man. In "Conspiracy of Silence", the Colbys are surprised when Miles comes home married to Randall, who they now know is an amnesiac Fallon Carrington (Emma Samms). Sable is delighted that her son has married an heiress. She is reunited with her estranged sister Francesca (Katharine Ross), Jeff's mother with Jason's deceased brother Philip, but makes it clear she hopes Frankie will not stay in town long. Hoping to tie Fallon to Miles, Sable suggests to Fallon that she have a baby as soon as possible in "Moment of Truth". Sable accuses Frankie of conspiring with Constance to benefit Jeff. Frankie intends to leave town, but is convinced to stay by Jason, with whom she had an affair many years ago. Sable comes across Jason's medical report and is shocked to learn that he is dying, unaware that his doctor has told him the diagnosis was a mistake. Sable apologizes to Frankie in "Family Album", hoping she will talk Constance about the shares she gave Jeff. Sable is told that the only way to reverse Constance's decision is to have her declared incompetent. When Constance dismisses Sable a final time, Sable goes to Jason with false concern about Constance's mental state. Sable is sure that Zach's interest in her is only a means to get to Jason, but she begins to soften to him. Sable continues her plan to make Constance appear senile in "Shadow of the Past". Sable loosens Constance's saddle, but is horrified when Frankie takes the horse and is almost injured. Constance, however, starts doubting herself.

In "A House Divided", Jason confides in Frankie that Sable has become very greedy and selfish, but Frankie encourages him to work on his marriage. Sable learns of Constance's secret boyfriend Hutch Corrigan (Joseph Campanella), and mistakenly comes to believe that he is a con man extorting money from her. Zach continues to pursue Sable, but she keeps him at arm's length. Sable tells a horrified Jason that she has taken the first steps to have Constance declared mentally incompetent. Sable tries to justify her actions to Jason in "The Reunion", but he does not like how she has changed and vows to fight her on Constance's behalf. Fallon has regained her memory, and Sable is unhappy when Miles offers to annul their marriage. Sable tells Constance that she can avoid a trial by simply undoing her gift to Jeff, but Constance refuses. Sable asks Frankie to take Jeff and to leave town so that she can save Miles's marriage and her own. Learning of Sable's lawsuit, Jeff goes to Constance and offers to return the shares in "Fallen Idol", but she refuses. Sable goes to Zach's apartment to view a painting and resists his advances. Sable apologizes to Frankie for her hostility, and though Jason is willing to give his marriage a second chance, he changes his mind when Sable refuses to drop her lawsuit. In "The Letter", Zach buys an expensive painting for Sable, who refuses to be bought but is drawn into a kiss. Sable accidentally hits Constance with her car, and then finds a letter Constance tried to destroy that suggests Jeff may not have been fathered by Philip. Though Constance only has a concussion, Sable is filled with remorse in "The Turning Point". She drops her lawsuit against Constance and tries to reconcile with Jason, who says it is too late.

Sable rejects the painting from Zach. She is shocked when a drunken Miles mentions Jason and Frankie's attraction to each other. Sable tries to stop Jason from divorcing her by threatening to expose Frankie's indiscretions, but Jason is unmoved. Sable reveals the letter concerning Jeff's paternity in "Thursday's Child", but Frankie reassures Jeff he is Philip's son. Sable is angry that Zach has been manipulating her family, but she cannot deny her attraction to him. In "The Pact", Sable threatens to use the letter against Frankie unless Jeff gives up Fallon. Jason agrees not to divorce Sable if she stops trying to prove in court that Jeff is not a Colby. In "Fallon's Choice", Constance discovers that Sable gaslighted her to make her seem confused. When Fallon chooses Jeff over Miles, Sable gives the letter to Miles, who intends to use it against Jeff in court. Jason blames Sable for showing the letter to Miles in "The Trial", and neither he nor Constance can convince Miles to drop the case. Sable calls out Frankie as a slut in public. In "Burden of Proof", Sable is shocked to hear Jason claim to be Jeff's father in court, and vows to never forgive him. Zach comforts Sable. She and Jason agree to divorce in "My Father's House", and she rejects Frankie's attempt at a reconciliation. Sable wants the house in the divorce, and though Jason is willing, Constance refuses to sell her half to him. Despite everything that Jason has done to her, Sable cannot sleep with Zach. She spends a platonic night as his penthouse, where Miles is shocked to find her. Sable is "The Outcast" horrified by the idea of Jeff and Fallon's wedding, which Jason insists she plan. Sable explains her being at Zach's place to Miles, and then clashes with Fallon over wedding arrangements. Constance's private investigator records a conversation in which Zach professes to Sable his desire to sleep with her. Sable enrages Jason when she attacks Frankie again.

In "The Wedding", Sable asks both Zach and Miles not to attend Jeff and Fallon's nuptials, but both men ignore her. Sable has hope for her marriage when it is clear Jason is still attracted to her. Sable is desperate when Miles is arrested for murder, and seeks comfort with Jason in "The Honeymoon". Knowing it will irk Sable, Constance invites Frankie to move into the pool house. Frankie, already angry with Sable, accepts. Sable is horrified when Miles tells her that he blacked out and does not know whether he committed the murder or not. Sable tells Zach in "Double Jeopardy" that she hopes to reconcile with Jason. Sable tries to mend fences with Constance, who does not believe Sable is being genuine. Sable overhears Frankie telling Constance that she is now divorced. In "A Family Affair", Sable remains unable to convince Constance of her good intentions, but manages to ingratiate herself to Jason by offering concern for Jeff, who has also been arrested for murder. Witnessing the chemistry between Jason and Frankie, Sable makes Frankie believe that she and Jason have reconciled and spent the night together, and does not admit that she is aware of Frankie's divorce. Believing Jason still loves Sable, Frankie is surprised when he proposes to her. Leaving for Greece to investigate Jeff's case, Jason and Frankie are joined by Sable, who has invited herself along for moral support. Sable tortures Frankie with details of her renewed relationship with Jason in "The Reckoning". Sable is terrified when it seems like Miles has jumped bail, and when he reappears she makes it clear she is willing to lie in court to give him an alibi. Fearful that when Jason divorces Sable she will ally with Zach against the Colbys, Constance gives Jason the tape of Sable and Zach. In "Anniversary Waltz", Miles turns down Sable's offer to perjure herself on his behalf. Faced with a surprise anniversary party planned by Sable, Jason presents the tape to her and says he loves Frankie. Jason confronts Zach, who he suspects framed Jeff and Miles, and they fight for Zach's gun. Sable arrives and is shot. In "Checkmate", Jason is overcome with guilt when he learns that a hospitalized Sable may lose her sight. Zach tells Jason that he loves Sable, but she has never been unfaithful. When the news comes that Sable will recover, a remorseful Jason tells her she will always be special to him, and gives her the tape. Sable takes this, and her belief that Jason confronted Zach over her, as a profession of Jason's love. She is distraught when he tells her he is going to the Dominican Republic to get a divorce. Sable chases after Jason to stop him but trips and falls down the stairs. Hurt and angry, she tells the district attorney that Jason attacked her. Jason is arrested.

=== The Colbys season two ===
In the season two premiere "The Gathering Storm", Sable refuses pleas from Frankie and Miles to drop the charges against Jason. He asks her to do so himself, and Sable says she will if he gives up his plan to divorce her. Sable's lawyer, Arthur Cates (Peter White), makes it clear that she will need Zach to testify for her. She goes to Zach and sleeps with him before asking him to back her up in court, but he refuses to lie for her. Sable is angry and humiliated in "No Exit", and seeing Jason and Frankie together ignites another tirade against Frankie. Despondent, Sable asks Monica for advice, and confesses that she lied to the police about Jason and now wants to drop the charges. Jason confronts Zach, certain he encouraged Sable's accusations, but learns that Zach refused to lie for Sable. Taking Arthur's advice, Sable drops the charges and, to avoid legal repercussions, pleads temporary mental incompetence brought on by her shooting. The family is happy with Sable's decision, but Jason is convinced that she only did it because Zach would not back her up. Frankie is appalled when Jason throws Sable out of the mansion, but she faints before she can leave. In "Jason's Choice", the doctor advises the family that Sable needs to stay in bed for a week. Sable decides that it is best for her to leave, but Miles, Monica, and Bliss ask Jason to let her remain in the mansion. Jason agrees if she does not oppose the divorce. She accepts, but Frankie is not happy about it. Jason gives the divorce papers to Sable in "The Matchmaker", while Zach gives her the Excelsior, the hotel he bought from Dominique. Zach offers to teach Sable how to wield the power she will receive by way of her divorce settlement.

Sable encourages Miles to make up his mind about his new girlfriend, Channing Carter (Kim Morgan Greene), unaware that she has been sent by her uncle, ruthless publisher Lucas Carter (Kevin McCarthy), to be his spy within the Colby family. When Channing accepts Miles's proposal and tells Lucas she will no longer spy for him, he maligns her with lies to Sable, who accompanies Lucas to Las Vegas to stop the wedding. Learning of their plan, Channing convinces Miles to marry her immediately in "Something Old, Something New". Arriving too late, Sable warns Channing not to hurt Miles like Fallon did. In "The Gala", Zach advises Sable to ask for class C stock in her divorce settlement, and Arthur recommends she offer Jason a quick divorce in exchange. Sable pressures Jason to give Miles a seat on the Colby Enterprises board, but he insists that Miles first needs to prove that he is serious about his marriage. Sable encourages an unreceptive Channing to get pregnant as soon as possible, but is concerned when she learns that Miles is still attracted to Fallon. While investigating Channing's fertility in "Bloodlines", Sable inadvertently discovers that the paternity of Fallon's child is uncertain, and deduces that the father may very well be Miles. In "Deceptions", Miles is furious when Sable reveals that he may be the father of Fallon's baby. Sable follows Jason and Frankie to Brussels in "And Baby Makes Four". In "Bid for Freedom", Sable helps convince Jason to assist Bliss's Russian ballet dancer boyfriend, Kolya Rostov (Adrian Paul), in defecting to the US. In "Sanctuary", Sable learns from Zach that Scott Cassidy (Coleby Lombardo), the young son of Senator Cash Cassidy (James Houghton) and his wife Adrienne (Shanna Reed), is really Monica's son with Cash whom she gave up for adoption eight years before. Sable confirms this with Monica, and advises her not to tell Jason yet. Meanwhile, Sable encourages Miles to resolve his latest issues with Channing because he will need a wife to get custody of Fallon's baby. Angry with Arthur for keeping her in the dark about Monica's child, Sable compels him to help her fix the situation now. In "Power Plays", Sable goes behind Monica's back and tries to convince Adrienne to give up Scott as a means to give Jason his first grandchild. Adrienne refuses and lashes out at Monica, who warns an indignant Sable to stay out of her private life.

With Zach's guidance, Sable creates a stir at her first Colby Enterprises board meeting, embarrassing Jason and then shocking him with the news that she co-owns with Zach an electronics company involved in Jason's satellite project. At the Excelsior, Jason reproaches Zach for weaponizing Sable against him, and Zach offers to call her off if Jason lets him into the project. With Constance presumed dead in a plane crash, in "The Legacy" Sable pretends to be affected and apologizes to Jason for all she did to Constance. Sable is triumphant when Constance's voting power is left to Miles, but she is disappointed when he will not use his new power to help her. Sable suggests that Monica tell Jason the truth about Scott in "The Home Wrecker", but Monica recognizes her mother's self-serving motives and forbids Sable from telling Jason. Sable tells Zach that his attacks on Colby Enterprises are also attacks on her, and he responds with an engagement ring. She asks for more time to decide. In "The Manhunt", Sable tries to convince Cash and Monica that Scott will be better off away from Adrienne, who has had addiction issues and made suicide attempts. Zach pressures Sable for an answer to his proposal in "All Fall Down", but she runs back to Jason when she learns that he was almost shot. She is pained to learn that Jason and Frankie are engaged. Jason tries to talk Sable out of marrying Zach, who Jason believes is dangerous. Sable assures him she is not ready to jump from one marriage to another so quickly. After Fallon falls down the stairs, her baby is in jeopardy in "Guilty Party". Sable tries to calm a distraught Miles, who is more afraid to lose Fallon than the child. Sable and Frankie find common ground in their concern for the baby. Sable and Monica finally talk about Monica's pregnancy and Scott's birth. In "Fallon's Baby", Sable continues investigating Adrienne, and witnesses Adrienne telling Cash that she is taking Scott back to Washington. Cash and Monica again refuse Sable's interference. Jason tries to convince Sable that her machinations will only alienate her children.

Zach wants an answer to his proposal, but Sable is still smarting over Jason and Frankie's engagement. In "Answered Prayers", Sable is as upset as Miles that Fallon's baby is not his, and recommends that he distance himself from Fallon. Sable and Jason sign their divorce papers as friends, but Sable assures him that he will not be happy with Frankie. Frankie hopes to patch things up with Sable before her wedding to Jason, but Sable is unforgiving. Monica and Miles are worried that Sable plans to marry Zach. In Marrakesh, with Zach, Sable can only think about the wedding happening in Los Angeles. In "Return Engagement", Sable and Zach are set to marry when Sable learns that presumed-dead Philip Colby (Michael Parks), Frankie's ex-husband and Jeff's father, has returned. Sable reconnects with Philip and assures him that Frankie loves Jason, but Philip is doubtful. Sable witnesses a near-kiss between Philip and Frankie. Zach, spurned again by Sable, suggests to Adrienne that they help each other with their problems. Sable rebuffs Zach in "Devil's Advocate", and commiserates with Philip about wanting to reunite with their former spouses. Sable is furious in "Betrayals" when she learns from Monica that Zach tried to blackmail Cash about Scott. Sable lashes out at Zach and returns his ring, vowing never to return to him. When Jason comes home unexpectedly, Sable tries to keep him away from the pool house where Philip is visiting Frankie, but Jason finds his fiancée and his brother in bed together. In "The Dead End", Sable tries to keep Jason and Philip apart, but they fight brutally. Jason remembers Sable's warning about Frankie, and thanks her for trying keep him away from the pool house to spare his feelings. Zach apologizes to Sable for his misdeeds, and though she believes he is remorseful, she is not in love with him and wants to stop the charade. Philip steals Sable's Colby Enterprises access card and steals sensitive information for Zach. In the series finale "Crossroads", Zach tells Sable that the person who tried to kill Jason is Philip, which she tells Jason. After witnessing Monica's heartbreaking goodbye to Scott, Sable picks the boy up from school without the Cassidys' consent and persuades him to come with her.

=== Dynasty season nine ===
In "A Touch of Sable", Sable is still living in Los Angeles when she runs into her cousin Alexis Colby. Alexis is there to meet with Sable's wealthy friend Hamilton Stone (Christopher Neame) to aid her in recovering her ships, which are being held in the African nation of Natumbe. Sable flirts with Alexis's ex-husband Dex Dexter (Michael Nader) in "She's Back", which merely amuses him. In "Alexis in Blunderland", Stone has earned Alexis's trust, and Sable uses his new inside knowledge of Colbyco's business dealings to attempt to seize control of Alexis's oil tankers. Tasked to sell the Carlton Hotel for Alexis, Dex inadvertently sells it to Sable in "Every Picture Tells a Story". When Fallon shows her an old photo of Blake with a man recently found dead in the Carrington lake, Sable suggests that Fallon talk to her mother Alexis about his identity. Sable tells Blake he has her support if the story comes out, as the dead man is Roger Grimes (J. Eddie Peck), Alexis's lover from 25 years before. Sable's friendship with Blake's wife Krystle deepens in "The Wedding". Krystle recognizes the man whom Sable has been sending to dive in the lake, Gibson (Stan Sells), so Sable tells him to discontinue his efforts. In "Ginger Snaps", Jeff accuses Sable of trying to replace Krystle at Blake's side. Having discovered an underground passage, Gibson continues his investigation, only to be warned away from Denver by Sable in "Delta Woe".

Sable and Dex flirt after they each independently follow Colbyco's comptroller, Fritz Heath (Kenneth Tigar), to a casino. In "Tankers, Cadavers to Chance", Sammy Jo Carrington (Heather Locklear) recognizes Gibson as the man Krystle described, and Gibson threatens Sable to get him out of police custody. Alexis romances Dex to get him away from Sable, but soon Sable taunts Alexis with the news that she has taken possession of Alexis's tankers. Blake confronts Gibson in "All Hands on Dex", and learns that Sable hired him. Blake accuses Sable of acting on her ex-husband Jason's behalf, but before she can explain, Alexis arrives and vows to destroy them both. Heath becomes indebted to Sable when she acquires his gambling marker, and she jubilantly throws herself in Dex's arms. In "Virginia Reels", Sable tells Blake and Dex she was searching the lake to discover what Jason was keeping hidden there. She explains that she had no idea Blake and Dex would be harmed by her investigation, and Dex is intrigued by her honesty. Jealous of Dex's interest in Sable, her assistant Joanna Sills (Kim Terry) befriends Adam Carrington (Gordon Thomson. Sable threatens to reveal that Heath is embezzling money from Colbyco unless he helps her obtain leverage against Alexis. He demands $5 million for such information, and when Sable laughs, he pulls a gun on her. Sable is able to convince Heath to lower the gun in "House of the Falling Son", and he tells her how she can ruin Colbyco. Rattled by the encounter, Sable goes to Dex and they spend the night together. Sable questions Joanna's loyalty when she confronts Sable for putting herself between Joanna and Dex, and Dex later rebuffs Joanna's advances. Sable apologizes to Dex for their night together, saying she respects his love for Alexis. But despite their mutual protestations that their encounter meant nothing, they fall into bed together again. Adam tries to charm Joanna into spying on Sable for him and Alexis in "The Son Also Rises". Sable's doubts about Joanna are confirmed when she sees Joanna go into Adam's suite. Sable asks Dex if he will choose Blake over Alexis if they go to war, and Joanna accepts Adam's offer.

Sable's daughter, Monica, comes to Denver for a visit, and Sable convinces her to stay and help her with her campaign to destroy Alexis. In "Grimes and Punishment", Joanna tells Adam everything she knows about Sable. Alexis reveals to a shocked Sable that her tankers have been destroyed, and Sable vows revenge. Alexis is devastated to learn that Dex slept with Sable, and Monica tries to persuade Jeff to take Sable's side in the impending war between Alexis and Sable. In "Sins of the Father", Alexis is emotionally crushed by Dex's affair with Sable. Seeing a painting that Roger Grimes gave to Alexis, Sable deduces the secret of the lake. Blake confesses to her and Dex that hidden beneath the lake is a Nazi treasure of precious art innocently obtained by his father which the Carrington, Colby, and Dexter families have kept secret to protect their reputations. The treasure vanishes in "Tale of the Tape", and Blake tasks Sable to find out what Alexis may know about it. Jeff warns Blake not to trust Sable. Sable serves Alexis with a lawsuit with which she intends to ruin her cousin. Alexis indicates she knows a secret or two about Sable. Sable learns that Alexis is having the painting appraised in "No Bones About It", and convinces the appraiser to tell Alexis it is worthless. Sable learns she is pregnant in "Here Comes the Son", but is unable to tell Dex he is the father. An altercation between Jeff and Adam in "Blasts from the Past" prompts Alexis to reveal in front of Sable and Monica that Jason is not Miles or Monica's father. A furious Sable attacks Alexis and they have a public catfight in the lobby of the Carlton. Sable tells Dex that he is the father of her baby, but rejects his offer to help raise the child. Sable confides in Blake that twins Miles and Monica were the products of rape. Having learned about the Nazi treasure, Alexis offers to spare Blake public scorn in the series finale "Catch 22" if Sable withdraws her lawsuit against Colbyco. Sable agrees and they sign the appropriate contracts at the Carlton, with Dex, Adam and Monica also present. During the meeting, Adam and Dex get into a fight which results in Dex and Alexis being sent toppling through the upper floor balcony as Sable and Monica watch in horror.
