= List of The Colbys characters =

The Colbys is an American prime time television soap opera TV show that originally aired on ABC from November 20, 1985, to March 26, 1987. Created by Richard and Esther Shapiro and Eileen and Robert Pollock and produced by Aaron Spelling, it is a spin-off of Dynasty and revolves around the Colbys, a wealthy family residing in Los Angeles, California. The Colbys stars Charlton Heston as tycoon Jason Colby, Barbara Stanwyck as his sister Constance, Stephanie Beacham as his wife Sable, Katharine Ross as Sable's sister and Jason's lover Francesca, Maxwell Caulfield as Jason and Sable's son Miles Colby, Tracy Scoggins as their daughter Monica Colby, and Ricardo Montalbán as Jason's business rival Zach Powers. John James and Emma Samms also star as their Dynasty characters Jeff Colby and Fallon Carrington.

== Overview ==
Main cast (opening credits in every episode)
Semi-regular cast (opening credits in select episodes)

Actor	Character	Seasons	
Actor	Character	1	2
Charlton Heston	Jason Colby	Main	Main
John James	Jeff Colby	Main	Main
Katharine Ross	Francesca Colby	Main	Main
Emma Samms	Fallon Carrington	Main	Main
Maxwell Caulfield	Miles Colby	Main	Main
Stephanie Beacham	Sable Colby	Main	Main
Tracy Scoggins	Monica Colby	Main	Main
Joseph Campanella	Hutch Corrigan	Main	
Claire Yarlett	Bliss Colby	Main	Main
Ricardo Montalban	Zach Powers	Main (Note: Credited in opening as "Special Guest Star".)	Main
Ken Howard	Garrett Boydston	Main	Main
Barbara Stanwyck	Constance Colby	Main	
John Forsythe	Blake Carrington	Main (Note: Credited in opening as "Special Appearance by" as part of a crossover with Dynasty.)	
Diahann Carroll	Dominique Deveraux	Main	Main
Gordon Thomson	Adam Carrington	Main	
Jack Coleman	Steven Carrington	Main	
Michael Parks	Philip Colby		Main

Cast notes

=== Main ===
Jason Colby (Charlton Heston (original cast), 1985–1987)
CEO of Colby Enterprises and brother of Constance, Philip, and Cecil. As the series opens, Philip and Cecil are both deceased – the former in Vietnam, the latter in Denver during the third season of Dynasty. Jason is married to Sable, and their children are twins Miles and Monica, and youngest daughter Bliss. Jason's affair with Francesca Langdon, his wife's sister and his brother Philip's former wife, ends his marriage; he later discovers that he is the father of Francesca's son Jeff. When he first appears in Season 6 of Dynasty, he is diagnosed with a terminal illness and given only one year to live. However, it was later revealed that he was never sick at all and the mistake was due to a computer error.

Constance "Connie" Colby Patterson (Barbara Stanwyck (original cast), 1985–1986)
Jason Colby's strong-willed sister, who sets the stage for the series by inviting Jeff Colby to California, hoping to mend the rift between him and the rest of the family. Believing her brother Jason is dying and in need of an heir who can run the Colby empire, Constance gifts to Jeff her 50 percent of the company's voting stock, which incurs Sable's anger, leading into one of the first season's major storylines. Stanwyck left the series after the first season, with the character being killed in a plane crash while traveling in Asia.

Jeff Colby (John James (original cast), 1985–1987)
The son of Philip and Francesca Colby, raised in Denver by his uncle Cecil Colby on the Colby estate, Nine Oaks, which neighbored the Carrington estate. He is invited to Los Angeles by Constance and soon becomes embroiled in the dynastic intrigue of the Colbys, reuniting with his presumed-dead wife Fallon and estranged mother, and eventually discovering that his uncle Jason Colby is in fact his biological father. At first, he is angry and resentful over the revelation, but with help from Constance and Fallon, Jeff eventually accepts Jason as his father.

Lady Francesca "Frankie" Scott Colby Hamilton Langdon (Katharine Ross (original cast), 1985–1987)
Philip Colby's widow, who returns to Los Angeles after years in "exile" as the wife of diplomat Lord Roger Langdon (David Hedison). She is Jeff's mother, but had abandoned him as an infant, bending to pressure from brother-in-law Cecil. Francesca reappears at the invitation of Constance, who is anxious to make amends. Frankie, as she is known, is also Sable's estranged sister, and Jason's lover.

Sabella "Sable" Scott Colby (Stephanie Beacham (original cast), 1985–1987)
British-born art gallery owner, wife of Jason, sister of Francesca and mother of Miles, Monica, and Bliss. The first cousin of Dynasty's Alexis Carrington Colby (Cecil's widow), Sable is protective of her family but vengeful when Jason casts her aside for Francesca. She is also frequently at odds with Constance over her decision to give her shares of Colby Enterprises to Jeff—even going so far as to making her believe she is going senile and attempting to have her committed. These actions cause irreversible damage to her relationship with Jason as time goes on, leading to the eventual disintegration of their once-happy marriage. Sable and Alexis share a rivalry hinted at on The Colbys but further explored a number of years later on Dynasty.

Fallon Carrington Colby (Emma Samms (original cast), 1985–1987)
Daughter of Dynasty's Blake Carrington, and Jeff's on-again, off-again wife; she also marries his cousin Miles. The role had been originated on Dynasty by Pamela Sue Martin, who had left the series in 1984 and the character presumed dead in a plane crash. Fallon (Samms) reappears briefly on Dynasty in 1985 with amnesia before transitioning to The Colbys, the subsequent love triangle between her, Jeff, and Miles driving much of the drama for the first season. She later returns to Denver and Dynasty for its final seasons.

Miles Colby (Maxwell Caulfield (original cast), 1985–1987)
Jason and Sable's playboy son, noted mainly for his arrogant attitude, his disastrous relationships (first, with the amnesiac Fallon, who he married whilst calling herself Randall Adams and second, with the emotionally unstable Channing Carter who initially did not want to have any children) and his rivalry with cousin Jeff, who is later revealed to be his half-brother.

Monica Colby (Tracy Scoggins (original cast), 1985–1987)
Jason and Sable's daughter, and general counsel for Colby Enterprises until she quits to manage Titania Records for Dominique Deveraux. However, she returns to her old job after Dominique sells the company to help Blake. Monica is protective of her twin brother, Miles, but also holds a high regard for his rival (and their cousin) Jeff Colby. Monica has short-lived romantic involvements with both singer Wayne Masterson and married Titania Records executive Neil Kittredge. It is revealed that Monica's past affair with Cash Cassidy had produced a son, whom Constance had arranged for Cash to raise with his wife Adrienne, ending their relationship to preserve his political career.

Henry "Hutch" Corrigan (Joseph Campanella (original cast), 1985–1986)
Rugged, aged cowboy and boyfriend of Constance Colby who is killed in the plane crash in Asia.

Bliss Colby (Claire Yarlett (original cast), 1985–1987)
Jason and Sable's youngest child, a young and idealistic woman who has strong political beliefs which often put her at odds with her father, an oil and industry tycoon. Bliss has ill-fated romances with Sean McCallister and Spiros Koralis, the nephew and former stepson, respectively, of the Colby family's greatest enemy, Zach Powers. She eventually becomes involved with Kolya Rostov, a Russian dancer who defects to America.

Zachary "Zach" Powers (Ricardo Montalbán ("guest star"), 1985–1987)
European shipping tycoon who falls in love with Sable. Born into poverty, Powers blames the Colbys for his father's suicide. Vernon Scott of the Sun-Sentinel called the character "an insidious menace".

Garrett Boydston (Ken Howard (original cast), 1985–1986)
Levelheaded though sensitive lawyer for Colby Enterprises, who loved and pursued Dominique Deveraux. After their break up at the beginning of the second season, Garrett asks Jason to transfer him in Colby Enterprises' New York office which Jason did.

Philip Colby (Michael Parks, 1986–1987)
Former husband of Francesca and the black sheep of the Colby family, presumed killed in Saigon in 1957. Initially a mercenary using the name Hoyt Parker, Philip makes his presence known at Jason and Francesca's wedding and proceeds to disrupt the lives of the entire Colby family.

=== Recurring ===
Henderson Palmer (Ivan Bonar, 1985–1987)
Butler to the Colby family, married to Enid.

Enid Palmer (Alison Evans, 1985–1987)
Maid to the Colby family, married to Henderson.

Sean McAllister (Charles Van Eman, 1985–1986)
Environmentalist boyfriend to Bliss Colby who spies on the Colbys through Bliss for his uncle, Zach Powers. Earned a master's degree in marine biology from the University of Miami.

Arthur Cates (Peter White, 1985–1986)
Longtime lawyer to Sable Colby.

Dr. James L. "Jimmy Lee" Parrish (Ray Stricklyn, 1985-1986)
Psychiatrist

Neil Kittredge (Philip Brown, 1985–1986)
Vice-president of the Los Angeles branch of Titania Records who becomes involved with Monica while married.

Roger Langdon (David Hedison, 1985-1987)
British diplomat and lord who marries Francesca.

Wayne Masterson (Gary Morris, 1986)
Blind country singer at Titania Records who falls in love with Monica.

Spiros Koralis (Ray Wise, 1986)
Chief of the New York offices of Powers Shipping and Zach Powers' stepson. He feels animosity towards his stepfather, but does not act on it as Zach provided end-of-life care for his late mother. He has a fling with Bliss, which ends once Spiros wins his father's company back from Zach.

John Moretti (Vincent Baggetta, 1986)
California assistant district attorney with a vendetta against Jason Colby who charges Jeff and Miles with separate murder charges.

Channing Carter Colby (Kim Morgan Greene, 1986–1987)
Member of the Carter publishing family, a slinky, sneaky woman whom Miles Colby marries on the rebound after losing Fallon to Jeff. She does not want to have children because she watched her mother die in childbirth with her younger brother. She tells Miles that she is barren following a botched abortion, when in reality she is taking birth control pills behind his back. Their marriage is tested by Miles' obsession with Fallon's unborn baby, although Channing stops taking the pills in order to give Miles (and Sable) the child he wants.

Senator Cash Cassidy (James Houghton, 1986–1987)
Powerful senator, and son of one of Jason's deceased adversaries. He is the former lover of Monica, who had been his mistress when she attended college. Their relationship produced Scott, who was adopted by Cash and his wife Adrienne after intervention from Constance and Arthur Cates. He ended their initial relationship to further his political career, but upon his arrival in California, he tries to win Monica back. Eventually he succeeds, leaving Adrienne for her. Their happiness is short-lived, however, as Cash saves Jason from an assassination attempt at a business conference and is himself shot.

Adrienne Cassidy (Shanna Reed, 1986–1987)
Shrewd, sniping senator's wife who fights off Monica's interest in her family. Initially planning to stay behind in Washington, Adrienne accompanies Cash to Los Angeles after learning he would be working with Monica. She is trapped in a loveless marriage with Cash, and drinks in order to cope with her life. Determined to keep Scott away from Monica, she falls apart once Scott leaves her. She ends up telling both Monica and Jason about Scott's birth and adoption in anger.

Scott Cassidy (Coleby Lombardo, 1986–1987)
Monica's biological son with Cash, a bright young boy with an interest in space technology who was raised by Cash and his wife, Adrienne. He first meets Monica and they bond over an interest in space stations, but he turns against her when Cash leaves Adrienne for her. Monica is unaware that Scott is her son until Adrienne tells her.

Lucas Carter (Kevin McCarthy, 1986–1987)
Channing's uncle and chief of the Carter publishing empire, which produces an article describing Jason as an American traitor. He initially uses Miles and Channing's relationship to spy on Jason's business dealings, but Channing stands up to him and refuses to co-operate. Lucas, with help from his solicitor Billy Joe Erskine (John Dehner), arranges to have Jason shot at a conference meeting, but instead the gunman accidentally shoots Cash.

Nikolai "Kolya" Rostov (Adrian Paul, 1986–1987)
Russian ballet dancer who arrives with his sister Anna in California as part of their tour. After the KGB try to interfere in his and Bliss' relationship, he opts to defect to the U.S. instead of returning to the Soviet Union. To replace Anna, Sable brings in Gina Sinclair as his new leading lady, not knowing that he and Gina previously had a relationship in New York. She is determined to win him back, which puts a strain on his relationship with Bliss.

Anna Rostov (Anna Levine, 1986–1987)
Pretty blond ballerina from Russia and sister of Kolya, who initially tries to defect with him but ends up returning to the Soviet Union instead, under pressure from the KGB.

Georgina "Gina" Sinclair (Nana Visitor, 1987)
Ballet dancer from New York, brought in by Sable to replace Anna as Kolya's partner. Unknown to Bliss, Gina and Kolya were former lovers, having had a brief relationship when Kolya was on tour. She still harbours feelings for him, and arranges for Bliss to catch her kissing him during a rehearsal. Gina also breaks into Kolya's apartment just before Bliss arrives for a date, emerging in lingerie when she does. However, despite her attempts to seduce him, Kolya refuses to reignite their relationship.
