= Dynasty (1981 TV series) season 9 =

Television season

Dynasty
- Season 9
- No. of episodes: 22

Release
- Original network: ABC
- Original release: November 3, 1988 – May 11, 1989

Season chronology
- ← Previous; Season 8

The ninth and final season of Dynasty originally aired in the United States on ABC from November 3, 1988, through May 11, 1989. The series, created by Richard and Esther Shapiro and produced by Aaron Spelling, revolves around the Carringtons, a wealthy family residing in Denver, Colorado.

Season nine stars John Forsythe as millionaire oil magnate Blake Carrington; Linda Evans as his wife Krystle; Gordon Thomson as Blake and Alexis' eldest son Adam; Heather Locklear as Krystle's niece Sammy Jo; Michael Nader as Alexis's husband Dex Dexter; Emma Samms as Blake and Alexis' daughter Fallon; John James as Fallon's ex-husband Jeff Colby; Leann Hunley as Adam's wife Dana; Stephanie Beacham as Alexis' cousin Sable Colby; Tracy Scoggins as Sable's daughter Monica; and Joan Collins as Alexis Colby, Blake's ex-wife and the mother of Adam, Fallon, Steven, and Amanda.

== Development ==
David Paulsen joined Dynasty as Executive Supervising Producer for its ninth season, and took over the plotting of the series. In a money-saving move, Evans appeared in only six episodes early in the season as an ailing Krystle seeks brain surgery in Switzerland but is left in an offscreen coma. Similarly to cut costs, Collins was contracted for only 13 out of the season's 22 episodes. Former The Colbys character Sable (Stephanie Beacham) was brought in as both a platonic confidante for Blake and a nemesis for Alexis, and Tracy Scoggins also reprised her Colbys role as Sable's daughter Monica. The series moved from Wednesday to Thursday, but ratings continued to decline and Dynasty was ranked #69 in the United States for the season. In May 1989, new ABC entertainment president Robert A. Iger cancelled Dynasty, making the last episode of season nine the series finale. The show ended on a cliffhanger with Blake, Fallon, Krystina, Alexis and Dex in mortal peril.

== Plot ==
A storyline involving a murder and an old secret tying the Carrington, Colby, and Dexter families together spanned the season as Alexis and Sable sparred first over business and then over Dex.

== Cast ==
=== Main ===
- John Forsythe as Blake Carrington
- Linda Evans as Krystle Carrington (Note: Evans departs in "The Wedding" (ep. 9.8), and is credited until "Delta Woe" (ep. 9.10).)
- John James as Jeff Colby
- Gordon Thomson as Adam Carrington
- Michael Nader as Dex Dexter
- Heather Locklear as Sammy Jo Carrington
- Emma Samms as Fallon Carrington Colby
- Leann Hunley as Dana Waring (Note: Hunley departs in "Broken Krystle" (ep. 9.1), although she remains credited in "A Touch of Sable" (ep. 9.2).)
- Tracy Scoggins as Monica Colby (Note: Scoggins is added to the opening credits from "The Son Also Rises" (ep. 9.15).)
- Stephanie Beacham as Sable Colby (Note: Beacham first appears uncredited in "A Touch of Sable" (ep. 9.2) before being added to the opening credits from "She's Back" (ep. 9.3).)
- Joan Collins as Alexis Carrington

=== Recurring ===
- Ray Abruzzo as Sgt. John Zorelli
- Kim Terry-Costin as Joanna Sills
- Liza Morrow as Virginia Metheny
- Kevin Bernhardt as Father Tanner McBride
- John Brandon as Capt. William Handler
- J. Eddie Peck as Roger Grimes
- Virginia Hawkins as Jeanette Robbins
- Kenneth Tigar as Fritz Heath
- Lezlie Deane as Phoenix Chisolm
- William Beckley as Gerard
- Christopher Neame as Hamilton Stone

=== Notable guest stars ===
- Ed Marinaro as Creighton Boyd
- Hank Brandt as Morgan Hess

Cast notes

== Episodes ==
No. overall	No. in season	Title	Directed by	Written by	Original release date	Prod. code	US viewers (millions)	Rating/share (households)
199	1	"Broken Krystle"	Irving J. Moore	Story by : David Paulsen & Barbara Esensten & James Harmon Brown; Teleplay by : Barbara Esensten & James Harmon Brown	November 3, 1988	DY-196	17.9	12.8/20
Sean is shot and killed during the struggle with Dex. Fallon toys with Sammy Jo after Sammy Jo nearly catches Fallon in Jeff's bedroom when she stops by his apartment to accept his marriage proposal. Following Krystle's bizarre disappearance, Blake searches frantically for her, fearing Krystle's mental illness may be developing. Looking to get out of Denver following Sean's death, Alexis and Dex go to Los Angeles where they rekindle their relationship. Adam withdraws into a drunken stupor, alienating his family and Dana. While searching for Krystle at one of her favorite spots, an out of the way lake, Sammy Jo and Jeff see something floating in the water; investigating closer, they are stunned when they discover a dead body. Dynasty moved from Wednesday nights to Thursdays for season nine.
200	2	"A Touch of Sable"	Irving J. Moore	Story by : David Paulsen & Ron Renauld; Teleplay by : Ron Renauld	November 10, 1988	DY-197	17.8	12.4/19
The body in the lake turns out to be that of an unknown man. Adam finds Steven's goodbye letters to Blake and Sammy Jo and burns them; however, Fallon comes across the partially charred remains and suspects her brother of treachery. After Dex expresses his unwillingness to help Alexis strengthen her empire, she takes advantage of Sable's unexpected return and her political and financially affluent friend, Hamilton Stone. Alexis persuades Stone to help her get her ships back from Natumbe, while Sable contemplates how she can benefit from their budding relationship. Blake learns that Krystle is in Dayton, Ohio with her cousin, Virginia. Flying to Dayton, Blake learns that Krystle's memory has regressed back to her earlier life growing up in Dayton and that she had mentioned she was on the run from someone who was trying to kill her. Listening in shock, Blake is further stunned when she tells him Krystle confessed to having killed a man.
201	3	"She's Back"	Nancy Malone	Story by : David Paulsen & James Harmon Brown & Barbara Esensten; Teleplay by : James Harmon Brown & Barbara Esensten	December 1, 1988	DY-198	14.8	10.9/17
Blake is relieved to find that Krystle's mental condition has improved, but remains distressed when she has no memory of the past few days. Adam persuades Steven's secretary, Claire Tennyson, to work for him, hoping she will reveal some of Steven's secrets; Claire eagerly accepts, having her own devious reasons for doing so. With Alexis in Natumbe with Hamilton Stone, Sable pours her seductive charms on Dex, who is only amused by her passes. Krystle is overcome by a painful migraine, as the reason for her attacks continues to frustrate her. Finding out from Sgt. Zorelli that she is a suspect in a murder, Krystle accuses Blake of lying to her. Needing to know what happened at the lake, Krystle goes to Sammy Jo, demanding to be told the truth. Finding out about the body in the lake, she convinces Blake to take her to the morgue to see the corpse. Pulling back the sheet, Krystle does not recognize the face. But when Blake looks, he cringes with the recognition of who it is. Dynasty was preempted for two weeks on November 17 and 24, 1988. First, by Part 4 of War and Remembrance on November 17, and then by Mary Poppins on November 24.
202	4	"Body Trouble"	Dwight Adair	Story by : David Paulsen & Tita Bell & Robert Wolfe; Teleplay by : Tita Bell & Robert Wolfe	December 8, 1988	DY-199	12.9	9.7/15
Adam starts scheming when Blake insists Adam run Denver-Carrington with Fallon and Jeff, instead of by himself. Sammy Jo is not thrilled with the idea of Jeff working with Fallon and it only gets worse when, after making love, Jeff calls Sammy Jo by Fallon's name. Krystle goes Los Angeles with Blake to meet with Dr. Hampton where she learns the true nature of her illness. Accompanying Sgt. Zorelli to the morgue to identify the body, Fallon privately thinks that the dead man looks familiar. Sharing her thoughts with Blake upon his return, he admits the young man looks like someone he knew many years ago. Blake goes through photographs dating back to 1963, showing the man and Blake together. While mingling with guests at a party for Blake's friends and supporters, Krystle is gripped by a painful headache. Losing control, she flings dishes at the guests until Blake is able to calm her. Arriving at the party unexpected, Sgt. Zorelli informs Krystle she is no longer suspected of murder after an autopsy showed the body to be dead for over twenty years.
203	5	"Alexis in Blunderland"	Nancy Malone	Story by : David Paulsen & Ron Renauld; Teleplay by : Ron Renauld	December 15, 1988	DY-200	14.2	10.7/17
With a gloomy prognosis for Colbyco, Alexis is desperate to liquidate her assets and she makes plans to sell the Carlton Hotel and the Vitron tankers, as the realization she may lose everything finally hits her. Finding out about Fallon's one night stand with Jeff, Sammy Jo squares off with Fallon. Wrestling with each other, they fall into a water trough and then take a roll through the mud, before they finally realize they are fighting over a man neither wants anymore. Adam plots to double cross Jeff by reading Steven's confidential notes on the pipeline. Fallon questions Dex on what he knows about the man-made lake where the body was found. Uneasy about discussing the subject, Dex admits the lake was made after a project had gone bad between Blake, the Colbys, and Dexter's family. Sable is delighted to hear Hamilton Stone has succeeded in winning Alexis's trust. With Stone's inside knowledge of Colbyco's business dealings, Sable schemes to take Alexis's oil tankers. Blake receives a bad news call from Krystle's doctor. Seeing the pain on Blake's face, Fallon barges into the library demanding to know what is going on. Finding Krystle crying in Blake's arms, he asks Fallon to gather the family.
204	6	"Every Picture Tells a Story"	Bruce Bilson	Story by : David Paulsen & Barbara Esensten & James Harmon Brown; Teleplay by : Barbara Esensten & James Harmon Brown	December 22, 1988	DY-201	14.1	10.3/17
Taking the picture of Blake standing with the young man found floating in the lake, Fallon sets up an appointment with Sergeant Zorelli to view the corpse. Krystle undergoes more tests to determine her reaction to a new drug. Virginia joins Blake and Krystle at the hospital. Blake and Virginia develop a special bond of friendship. After sleeping with Claire, Adam tells her it is best she find another job. Following her tests, Krystle has a new resolve to live. Sammy Jo and Fallon put their differences aside and develop a friendship. Dex asks Jeff to help him find more out about Fritz Heath, Colbyco's comptroller. A seething Alexis berates Dex for unwittingly selling the Carlton to Sable. Unable to view the corpse, Zorelli sets Fallon up in a room and gives her a picture. Unaware that a camera is focused on her, she pulls out Blake's picture and compares photographs, as Zorelli watches. Virginia is awestruck by the opulence of the Carrington mansion as she returns to Denver with Blake and Krystle. Finding out about the picture, Sable goes to Blake to let him know that when the story gets out, he can count on her as an ally. Taking Sable's suggestion to ask her mother about the man in the picture, Fallon goes to Alexis for answers. Recognizing the man to be Roger Grimes, a man Blake discovered her having an affair with, she accuses Blake of murdering him 25 years ago.
205	7	"The Last Hurrah"	Dwight Adair	Story by : David Paulsen & Tita Bell & Robert Wolfe; Teleplay by : Tita Bell & Robert Wolfe	January 5, 1989	DY-202	14.1	10.8/16
Blake is furious at Fallon for showing the picture of Roger Grimes to Alexis. Overhearing his tirade, Krystle is uncertain why Blake is so concerned by the picture. After Alexis vows to make Blake suffer for killing Roger Grimes, Dex is convinced that she still harbors feelings for Roger. Deciding not to be Alexis's toy lover any longer, Dex pays an amorous visit to Joanna Sills, Sable's personal assistant. While visiting the seedy part of town with Sammy Jo and Virginia, Krystle looks for ways she can help the unfortunate. Approached by a man with a knife, Virginia attacks him with a viciousness that makes Sammy Jo think she may be more street wise than she wants people to think. Krystle is told her only chance for survival is an operation with a marginal chance of success. Alexis is outraged by her discovery that Hamilton Stone only got two of her ships out of Natumbe. Finding out about Alexis's vendetta against Blake, Krystle barges into her apartment. Krystle threatens to use her recent mental illness as a justifiable excuse to kill Alexis if she carries out her plans to accuse Blake of Roger Grimes murder. Dynasty was preempted by The Ice Capades with Kirk Cameron on December 29, 1988.
206	8	"The Wedding"	Jerry Jameson	Story by : David Paulsen & Tita Bell & Robert Wolfe; Teleplay by : Tita Bell & Robert Wolfe	January 12, 1989	DY-203	15.1	10.8/16
Krystle agrees to the operation only after Blake reluctantly signs her divorce papers and living will, to be enacted if the surgery is not a success. Virginia tells Krystle of her troubled youth after their mother left her. Krystle invites Sable to dinner and their friendship continues to grow. Fallon is haunted by a recurring dream of Roger Grimes. Dex hires a Vietnam buddy, Painter, to investigate Colbyco's controller. Krystle recognizes one of the caterers at her dinner party, Gibson, as the same man she sees coming out of the lake in her haunting nightmare. Fearing Krystle will put the puzzle together, Sable tells Gibson to discontinue his dives into the lake. Those are the same dives that originally uncovered the body of Roger Grimes. Thinking he has discovered an underwater passageway, Gibson is hesitant to abandon his search. Virginia reacts very strangely when she is introduced to Dex. Following the reaffirmation of their wedding vows, Blake is forced to cancel his and Krystle's second honeymoon. Krystle and Blake leave immediately for Switzerland so she can have the high risk operation.
207	9	"Ginger Snaps"	Kate Swofford Tilley	Story by : David Paulsen & Clyde Ware; Teleplay by : Clyde Ware	January 26, 1989	DY-204	14.4	10.4/16
The operation fails and Krystle is in a coma and will probably never wake up. A devastated Blake returns to Denver. Sammy Jo is struck down in the stable at Delta Rho by a mysterious guy snooping around. He loses a knife with the inscription: "To my scuba with love. Edy." Sammy Jo sleeps with Jeff. More money disappears from ColbyCo accounts, but Fritz claims he has full control. Blake and Dex discusses what to do about their secret. Apparently, a long time ago, Tom Carrington, Sam Dexter and Jason Colby had a mining company at the place where the lake is now. A serious happening made them swear to secrecy, but after the discovery of Roger Grimes, keeping it secret may be difficult. Fallon sleeps with John Zorelli. Jeff insinuates that Sable is in Denver to take Krystle's place. Virginia makes Dex remember who she is. Dynasty was preempted by Command Performance: An All-Star Salute to the President on January 19, 1989.
208	10	"Delta Woe"	Dwight Adair	Story by : David Paulsen & Don Heckman; Teleplay by : Don Heckman	February 2, 1989	DY-205	15.2	10.7/16
Following their passionate love making, Zorelli suspects Fallon is merely trying to influence him to drop the Roger Grimes case. After Virginia storms from Dex's room, leaving behind pictures of them together from a happier time, Dex is left stunned by the uncanny turn of events. Blake orders Zorelli to stay away from Fallon. To avoid having their family secret revealed, Blake vows to take the rap for Grimes's murder. Fallon continues to be haunted by the memory of Grimes. Sable discovers Gibson left his knife in Sammy Jo's barn. Confronting Gibson, she warns him to leave Denver or face her wrath. Zorelli receives a blown up photograph of Grimes with Blake, proving Blake knows more than he is letting on. Learning that Heath is a regular gambler at her friend's casino, Sable follows him there. Surprised to discover Dex has also followed Heath, Sable uses the opportunity to toy with Dex. Arousing his interest, Sable then turns him off like a cold shower. Alone in her barn, Sammy Jo hears noises and takes her shotgun to investigate. Gibson jumps her and she gets off a shot that hits Gibson. As Gibson drags himself out of the barn, a raging fire traps Sammy Jo inside.
209	11	"Tankers, Cadavers to Chance"	Kate Swofford Tilley	Story by : David Paulsen & Roberto Loiederman; Teleplay by : Roberto Loiederman	February 9, 1989	DY-206	9.4	7.0/12
Jeff pulls Sammy Jo from the burning barn, and Gibson is taken into custody. Sammy Jo recognizes Gibson as the man Krystle saw in her nightmares. Blake worries that Gibson is involved in trying to uncover his family secret. Dex gives Virginia a letter explaining his side of the story. She tears it up but later pieces it back together and gets teary as she reads it. Blake gives Dex an audio tape and documents relating to their secret for safe keeping. Loathing the thought of Sable winning over Dex, Alexis reignites his passion. Alexis fears the work she did to secure her ships in Natumbe may have run afoul. Adam snoops through Virginia's room and discovers the letter from Dex. Adam seduces Virginia and wins her trust. Gibson threatens Sable to get him out of jail. Zorelli storms into the Carrington mansion, accusing Blake of having him pulled off the Grimes case. Denying it, Blake has him thrown out. Torn between her father and her lover, Fallon leaves with Zorelli. Sable terrorizes Alexis with the news that she has undone all her work in Natumbe and gained possession of Alexis's tankers.
210	12	"All Hands on Dex"	Dwight Adair	Story by : David Paulsen & Don Heckman; Teleplay by : Don Heckman	February 16, 1989	DY-207	14.7	10.6/16
Irate after Sable gains control of her ships, Alexis hires one of Adam's unsavory friends, the handsome and intriguing Cray Boyd, to get them back. Running into Hamilton Stone at the Carlton, Alexis promises to make him pay dearly for double crossing her. Shaken by her threats, Stone ponders the damage she could cause. Sammy Jo is mistaken for a sixteen-year-old runaway by Tanner McBride, a teen counselor. Apologizing and embarrassed, Tanner is attracted to Sammy Jo. Zorelli pleads with his captain for a second chance, only to be sternly denied. Dex begins to doubt his and Alexis's relationship can survive. Jeff reprimands Adam for neglecting his loyalties to Blake. Stung by his reproach, Adam swings wildly at Jeff. After several missed blows, Adam orders Jeff out of the house. Blake confronts Gibson. Offering to help him if he talks, Gibson tells Blake Sable hired him. Accusing Sable of working for Jason, Blake lashes out at her. Before Sable can explain, Alexis walks in on their fight, renewing her vow to crush them both. Sable finds reason to rejoice when Joanna gives her Fritz Heath's marker, indebting him for over two-hundred thousand dollars to her. Dex walks in on Sable's jubilation and she throws herself into his arms, taking him and Joanna by surprise.
211	13	"Virginia Reels"	Bruce Bilson	Story by : David Paulsen & Barbara Esensten & James Harmon Brown; Teleplay by : Barbara Esensten & James Harmon Brown	February 23, 1989	DY-208	13.9	10.3/16
Sable meets with Blake and Dex to explain she was searching the lake to discover what her ex-husband, Jason, was determined to keep hidden. She assures them that she had no idea Blake and Dex would be harmed by uncovering the secret that lay hidden there. Dex is intrigued by her honesty. Sammy Jo helps Tanner McBride persuade an official to let him retain temporary custody of one of his runaways. Appreciative of her efforts, Tanner brings her a rose and leaves his number for her to call if she ever wants to talk. Sable threatens to reveal Heath's embezzling money from Colbyco unless he helps her obtain damaging information on Alexis. Dex learns that Adam took advantage of Virginia after reading the letter he wrote. Outraged, he attacks Adam, threatening to kill him. Jealous of Dex's interest in Sable, Joanna accepts Adam's offer to get better acquainted. Going against orders, Zorelli copies a map taken from Gibson outlining the lake and Delta Rho. Fallon discovers the picture Zorelli took of her holding the picture of Blake with Roger Grimes, and suspects he is using her to get information on Blake. Blake is saddened by Virginia's decision to leave Denver. Sable is amused by Heath's demand for 5 million dollars for the information on Alexis. Pulling out a gun, Heath nervously aims it at Sable.
212	14	"House of the Falling Son"	Alan Myerson	Story by : David Paulsen & Ron Renauld; Teleplay by : Ron Renauld	March 2, 1989	DY-209	13.5	10.0/15
Sable is able to maintain a calm facade and convince Heath to put the gun down so they can talk. Agreeing, and feeling more at ease, Heath talks about how Sable can ruin Colbyco. After Heath leaves, Sable is still in shock from her close encounter with death. Needing to be with someone, she goes to Dex. Blake questions Dex about what Adam did to Virginia to make her want to leave. Hearing the truth, Blake kicks Adam out of the house, as Blake feels his family slip away from him. Alexis goes to Paris to check on Boyd's commando operation. Alexis finds herself wanting Boyd. Fallon moves in with Sammy Jo. Zorelli asks Fallon to explain why she is suddenly cold to him. Joanna confronts Sable for stepping in between her and Dex, causing Sable to suspect Joanna's loyalty. Joanna tries to seduce Dex but he turns down her advances. Sable meets with Dex to apologize for their night together, promising she respects his love for Alexis. Despite their polite insistence that the whole affair meant nothing, they feel a burning desire for each other. Unable to resist, they go back to her suite and make passionate love. Before Boyd leaves for his dangerous mission, Alexis gives in to her own lust, as she allows Boyd to take her into his arms.
213	15	"The Son Also Rises"	Ron Satlof	Story by : David Paulsen & Roberto Loiederman; Teleplay by : Roberto Loiederman	March 16, 1989	DY-210	12.5	9.4/15
Seeing the disarray of Denver-Carrington, Blake resumes control of the company. His first act is to fire Adam. Appreciating Joanna's knowledge of Sable's affairs, Adam tries to charm her into working for him and Alexis. Sable watches as Adam enters Joanna's suite, confirming her suspicions of Joanna's disloyalty. Zorelli realizes that Fallon saw the picture he stole of Blake and Grimes, explaining why she suddenly became hostile towards him. Sable asks Dex if he will be able to turn against Alexis if she pursues her vendetta against Blake. Tanner McBride stops by Delta Rho to make Sammy Jo and Fallon dinner. Fallon notices Sammy Jo's obvious attraction to him. Sable's daughter, Monica, comes to Denver to visit her mother. Knowing Joanna can no longer be trusted, Sable convinces Monica to stay in Denver and help her with her campaign to destroy Alexis. Zorelli tells Fallon that he is in love with her, and that he never meant to use her to get at Blake. Confused by her feelings for him, Fallon slaps Zorelli and orders him to leave. Zorelli offers her the only copy of the picture to prove he is not using her. Joanna accepts Adam's offer to work for Alexis. Jeff shows Blake an ad in Alexis's newspaper asking for information on Roger Grimes. Blake hardens his resolve to stop Alexis once and for all. Dynasty was preempted by America's All-Star Tribute to Elizabeth Taylor on March 9, 1989.
214	16	"Grimes and Punishment"	Nancy Malone	Story by : David Paulsen & Tita Bell & Robert Wolfe; Teleplay by : Tita Bell & Robert Wolfe	March 23, 1989	DY-211	14.9	10.9/18
Joanna agrees to tell Adam everything she knows about Sable, in exchange for his protection. Upon Alexis's return to Denver, Blake confronts her about the ad asking for information on Roger Grimes. She reasserts her vow to see him pay for Grimes' murder. Fearing Alexis may get a warrant to search the lake, Blake asks Dex to dive into the lake and make sure everything that needs to be hidden stays that way. Zorelli promises his commanding officer, Capt. Handler, that he will drop the Grimes case and is given his old job back. Sable is pleased when Monica moves in with her. But Sable's joy is short-lived when Alexis and Adam tell her the tankers have been destroyed, which further galvanizes her resolve to destroy Alexis. Sammy Jo offers Tanner a check for his home for runaways. She grows increasingly fond of him, unaware that he is married. Blake goes to Delta Rho to make amends with Fallon, and finds the picture Zorelli left behind. With all his faith in Fallon destroyed, Blake storms out. Dex goes to Alexis's penthouse to talk about her vendetta against Blake. With guilt written all over his face, she realizes he slept with Sable. Devastated, Alexis kicks Dex out. With a war clearly brewing between Alexis and Sable, Monica tries to persuade Jeff to take Sable's side. Alexis's grief over losing Dex is diverted when Adam tells her he has found a man who knows who killed Grimes. Elsworth Chisolm tells Alexis he saw Blake carry Grimes's body out of the mine he was working on.
215	17	"Sins of the Father"	Bruce Bilson	Story by : David Paulsen & Barbara Esensten & James Harmon Brown; Teleplay by : Barbara Esensten & James Harmon Brown	March 30, 1989	DY-212	14.3	10.3/16
Alexis is emotionally crushed by Dex's affair with Sable. She sends Adam to try to make up with Blake, so she can have a set of ears in his camp. Blake and Sable renew their bonds of friendship. Adam meets with Chisolm's granddaughter, Phoenix. She tells Adam that there was another secret project going on at the mine. Alexis rummages through a box of Roger Grimes's things and she comes across a picture he gave her. Sable sees the picture and suddenly realizes what Blake's secret is. Blake confesses to Dex and Sable that the secret beneath the lake is a Nazi treasure of precious art innocently obtained by his father. Blake vows to keep the treasure and his father's involvement a secret for fear it would ruin his family name. Blake tells them his father killed Grimes because he discovered the treasure and was trying to make his fortune from it. Sammy Jo gets a rude awakening when she discovers Tanner McBride is a priest, married to the church. Adam tells Blake that Alexis has a witness who saw him murder Grimes. Fallon realizes that her grandfather, Tom Carrington is also in her nightmares. She tells Zorelli that she remembers her grandfather taking her into dark tunnels. Dex dives into the lake and discovers the seal to the mine entrance is open. Zorelli watches from the shore.
216	18	"Tale of the Tape"	Dwight Adair	Story by : David Paulsen & Roberto Loiederman; Teleplay by : Roberto Loiederman	April 13, 1989	DY-213	14.2	10.6/17
Blake and Jeff are stunned when Dex finds the hidden vault beneath the lake completely empty. Returning from the lake, Jeff finds Sammy Jo waiting for him in his bed. Blake asks Sable to try to find out any information Alexis may know about the vanished treasure. Having a passkey to Alexis's suite, Sable waits for the right time to sneak in and take the painting Roger Grimes stole from the hidden Nazi treasure. Alexis tells Captain Handler about her eyewitness to Roger Grimes' murder. Even with the witness, Handler is reluctant to reopen the case. Zorelli subtly gets valuable information out of Fallon, leading him to the uncle of Blake's half-sister Dominique Devereaux. Meeting Dominique's uncle, Charles Matthews, Zorelli puts a bug in his house and learns Matthews knows more about Grimes’ murder than he is letting on. Jeff warns Blake that he does not think Sable can be trusted. Federal Marshals burst into Alexis's suite to seize Colbyco records, as Sable unleashes her lawsuit to bring Alexis to her knees. Alexis promises Sable that she, too, knows a few secrets, and is not afraid to reveal them. Alexis leaves for Switzerland to protect her assets. Adam phones Blake and tells him where he can find Elsworth Chisolm. While Fallon opens up to Zorelli about her grandfather and the mine beneath the lake, she does not know her conversation is being recorded. Chisolm makes a deal with Blake to tell him everything he knows about the secret tunnels beneath the lake. Someone watches them from a narrowly opened door. Adam pulls up just as Blake is leaving to get money for Chisolm. Going inside Chisolm's house, Adam finds him dead. Dynasty was preempted by a repeat of the 1988 Disney TV Movie Rock 'n' Roll Mom, which, incidentally enough, starred Heather Locklear on April 6, 1989.
217	19	"No Bones About It"	Michael Lange	Story by : David Paulsen & Tita Bell & Robert Wolfe; Teleplay by : Tita Bell & Robert Wolfe	April 20, 1989	DY-214	14.6	10.9/18
Captain Handler, suspecting Blake may have killed Chisolm, puts Zorelli back on the Grimes case, despite Zorelli's belief that Blake is innocent. Blake accuses Adam of setting him up to look like he killed Chisolm. Learning that Alexis is having her painting appraised, Sable convinces the appraiser to tell Alexis the painting is worthless. Sable learns someone has been searching for a Frederick Stahl painting. Adam has a hotel photographer shoot pictures of Monica and Jeff together. Charles Matthews warns Blake that Zorelli has been asking them questions. When Blake tells Fallon that Zorelli has been using her to get information about Matthews, her love for Zorelli turns to contempt. Tanner's feelings for Sammy Jo make him question his priestly vows. Finding a diagram with his father's things that Charles Matthews dropped off, Blake discovers that it is for a tunnel system originating from the basement of the mansion. Adam visits Phoenix Chisolm and in her grief, she blurts out that her grandfather knew about the tunnels under Blake's mansion. Acquiring a listening device that detects tunnels, Dex, Jeff, and Blake search the basement for a tunnel entrance. Finding it, they crawl into the dark space and discover a human skeleton.
218	20	"Here Comes the Son"	Jerry Jameson	Story by : David Paulsen & Barbara Esensten & James Harmon Brown; Teleplay by : Barbara Esensten & James Harmon Brown	April 27, 1989	DY-215	12.2	9.1/15
Another skeleton is discovered buried in the tunnel beneath the mansion. Blake is convinced that whoever else is looking for the treasure also killed Elsworth. He gives Dex and Jeff one week to meet with Roger Grimes's widow, Emily, before he reveals their tangled secret to the police. To prove his loyalty to Fallon, Zorelli quits the police department. Tanner and Sammy Jo have an unspoken desire to be together. Sable learns she is pregnant, but is unable to tell Dex he is the father. Fallon decides to move into an abandoned cottage on Blake's property. Adam retouches the photograph he had taken of Jeff and Monica to appear as if their relationship may be incestuous. He then submits it to a sleazy tabloid for publication. Outraged, Jeff storms into the tabloid's office and begins attacking the reporter. A photographer captures the assault on film. Fallon recognizes a lullaby she hears Krystina sing. Setting up house in her cottage, she is haunted by the lullaby. Afraid her mind is playing tricks on her, Fallon thinks she sees Roger Grimes staring at her through the window. Desperate for answers, Blake goes to see Phoenix Chisolm. She refuses to let him in, creating a commotion that brings the neighbors out. They recognize Blake as the man who was with Elsworth before he was murdered. Emily Grimes tells Jeff and Dex that Roger had a son, Dennis. Seeing his picture, they are shocked by his resemblance to Roger. Outside Fallon's cottage window, Dennis Grimes watches her. Using a portable phone, he communicates with Captain Handler, assuring him their plan is working.
219	21	"Blasts from the Past"	David Paulsen	Story by : David Paulsen & Tita Bell & Robert Wolfe; Teleplay by : Tita Bell & Robert Wolfe	May 4, 1989	DY-216	12.3	9.4/15
Monica learns from Alexis that Jason Colby is not her father. A huge catfight ensues between Alexis and Sable. Fallon realizes that, as a little girl, she killed Roger Grimes to prevent him from attacking her mother.
220	22	"Catch 22"	David Paulsen	Samuel J. Pelovitz	May 11, 1989	DY-217	14.7	10.8/17
The series finale. When Blake and Jeff are set up by a corrupt cop, Blake ends up taking a bullet. Fallon and Krystina are stuck in a collapsing mine shaft. Alexis and Dex plunge from a balcony at the Carlton Hotel.

== Reception ==
In season nine, Dynasty was ranked #69 in the United States with a 10.5 Nielsen rating.
