= Wakeema Hollis =

American actress (born 1984)

- Born: November 25, 1984 (age 41); Memphis, Tennessee, U.S.
- Other name: Hollis
- Occupations: Actress; model
- Years active: 1999–present
- Spouse: Darrell Walden (m. 2022)
- Children: 1

Wakeema Hollis (born November 25, 1984) is an American actress and model. She is known for playing Monica Colby in the CW series Dynasty (2017–2021).

== Early life and modeling ==
Hollis was born in Memphis, Tennessee., but her mother, Frances, raised Hollis and her brother in Jackson, Tennessee, near her "vast extended family." She attended Alexander Elementary School, Jackson Central-Merry Middle and High School, where her theatre teacher, Becky Fly, introduced her to a love for acting. Hollis believes, "If I had never met Ms. [Becky] Fly, my life would have been so different [...] I would never be doing what I'm doing now. She saw something in me I didn't see in myself." At age 15, Hollis was introduced to an agent through Fly, and she began booking modeling jobs on weekends and during breaks from school.

After graduating From Jackson Central-Merry High School, Hollis moved to New York to pursue a modeling career. She appeared in high fashion magazines, walked runways in New York, Paris, Milan, and London, including before the British royal family, and worked with designers such as Marc Jacobs, Jean Paul Gaultier, Vivienne Westwood, and Ralph Lauren. Hollis later attended William Esper Studio in New York, which she graduated from in 2016. In an interview with Bustle in 2019, Hollis admitted that the decision to transition from modeling to acting was a difficult one, "Modeling was the only thing I knew ... it was really scary, but it was also what I wanted. It's what I've always wanted. I couldn't not do it."

== Acting ==
In 2017, within the span of a week, Hollis was cast in recurring roles as Monica Colby in The CW's Dynasty, a drama television series reboot based on the 1980s prime time soap opera of the same name, and Harriet in Prime Video's The Marvelous Mrs. Maisel, a period comedy-drama television series.

Hollis starred in The Photograph, a romantic drama film that was released on February 14, 2020. In 2021, Hollis appeared in And Just Like That... on Max, a revival/sequel series of HBO's Sex and the City.

== Personal life ==
Hollis resides in New York City, but she travels to Jackson, Tennessee at least once a year where her mother, brother, and extended family live. Hollis maintains her membership at her family's church, Deliverance House of Prayer.

On August 20, 2022, Hollis married Darrell Walden Jr. On November 13, 2024, Hollis announced that she and Walden were pregnant with their first child.

== Filmography ==
=== Film ===
Year	Title	Role
2015	Creative Control	Casey
2020	The Photograph	Denise Holness
2020	Paint	Christina
2023	Aurora: A Love Story	Giselle
2024	Mr. Santa: A Christmas Extravaganza	Mrs. Mackey

=== Television ===
Year	Title	Role	Notes
2014	Girls	Waitress	Episode: "Incidentals"
2014	Black Box	Kidada	Episode: "Kodachrome"
2014	The Mysteries of Laura	Natalie Marquez	Episode: "The Mystery of the Red Runway"
2015	The Affair	Hot Female	Episode: "206"
2017–2019, 2021	Dynasty	Monica Colby	Recurring role; 34 episodes
2017–2018	The Marvelous Mrs. Maisel	Harriet	Recurring role; 4 episodes
2019	Orange Is the New Black	Laniece	Episode: "The Big House"
2019	First Wives Club	Melissa	Recurring role; 3 episodes
2021–2023	And Just Like That...	Deirdre	Recurring role; 3 episodes
2022	Only Murders in the Building	Naomi Jackson/Brazzos	Episode: "Performance Review"
