= Adam Carrington =

Fictional soap opera character

- Dynasty character
- Gordon Thomson as Adam Carrington
- Portrayed by: Gordon Thomson (1982–1989); Robin Sachs (1991)
- Duration: 1982–1989, 1991
- First appearance: "The Plea" (1982)
- Last appearance: "Catch 22" (1989)
- Created by: Richard and Esther Shapiro
- Spin-off appearances: The Colbys (1985–1986); Dynasty: The Reunion (1991)
In-universe information
- Other names: Michael Torrance
- Occupation: Attorney; Executive (Denver-Carrington and ColbyCo)
- Father: Blake Carrington
- Mother: Alexis Colby
- Brothers: Steven Carrington
- Sisters: Fallon Carrington Colby; Amanda Carrington
- Half-sisters: Krystina Carrington
- Spouse: Claudia Blaisdel (1985–1986); Dana Waring (1987–1988); Kirby Anders (engaged, 1991)
- Sons: 1
- Grandparents: Tom Carrington; Ellen Carrington
- Aunts and uncles: Ben Carrington; Dominique Deveraux; Caress Morell
- Nieces and nephews: L.B. Colby; Lauren Colby; Danny Carrington
- First cousins: Leslie Carrington; Jackie Deveraux

Adam Alexander Carrington is a fictional character from the ABC prime time soap opera Dynasty, created by Richard and Esther Shapiro. Introduced at the beginning of the series' third season, the role was originated by Gordon Thomson in 1982. He continued to appear as a series regular until the series finale in 1989. For the 1991 miniseries continuation, the role of Adam Carrington was recast with Robin Sachs as Thomson was unavailable. In the 2017 reboot of the series, Sam Underwood played Adam from 2019 to 2022.

The addition of Adam to the cast provided a male villain to the show. Over the next seven seasons, Adam would be motivated primarily by jealousy, undermining the professional successes of his brother Steven and brother-in-law Jeff, in an attempt to curry favor with his parents, especially his father. Adam would betray both his parents multiple times but would be forgiven, even when his acts were criminal, due to residual feelings of guilt for Adam's difficult childhood. When circumstances arise that truly make Adam sympathetic, he squanders that good will due to his selfish, jealous nature.

== Original series ==
=== Appearances ===
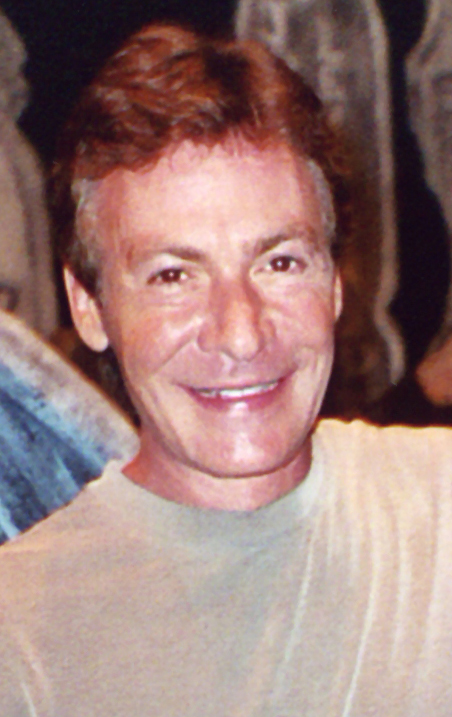
Robin Sachs portrays Adam in the 1991 reunion miniseries.

Gordon Thomson originated the role of Adam Carrington in "The Plea", the September 1982 season premiere of Dynasty's third season. According to Thomson, "They had planned on Adam being an impostor but they liked him so much they decided to keep him on. They tested me for 13 shows, then extended that to 24." Thomson played the character until the series finale in 1989.

Adam was recast with British actor Robin Sachs for the 1991 miniseries Dynasty: The Reunion because Thomson was unavailable, filming the daytime series Santa Barbara.

=== Characterization ===
In 1986, the New Sunday Times called Adam "one of the truly imaginative, despicable villains on television", noting that "Adam has raped the butler's daughter, painted poor Jeff Colby's office with poisonous, lead-based paint, tricked Blake into signing over power of attorney while he lay at death's door—and blew a competitor out of the water by plastering his son's homosexuality all over Denver's front pages."

Comparing Adam to J.R. Ewing (Larry Hagman), the villainous oil baron on Dallas, Thomson said, "Adam doesn't have as much money or power. But Adam is more underhanded and he isn't as blatant." He added, "Ruthless men usually attain power." Thompson explained that soap operas need villains to drive story, and said, "I've played heavies before but none as demonic as Adam. He's the most rotten guy in prime time."

=== Storylines ===
==== Season 3 ====
In "The Plea", former spouses Blake and Alexis Carrington make a televised plea for the return of their kidnapped infant grandson L.B. Colby. While on the air, Alexis confesses a dark secret from their past: their firstborn son, Adam, had been kidnapped as a baby and was never recovered. Traumatized by the event, they had hidden his existence from their subsequent children Fallon and Steven. Meanwhile, in Billings, Montana, an elderly woman named Kate Torrance watches the broadcast from her deathbed. She tearfully tells her grandson Michael—whom she has raised since he was a baby after his parents supposedly died in a car crash—that he is really Adam Carrington. After her real grandson had died in the crash, a distraught Kate had kidnapped Adam. As proof of her story, she shows Michael an engraved silver baby rattle with the monogram AAC. As her dying wish, Kate tells a stunned Michael to find and rejoin his real family. Michael agrees, telling Kate, "My name is Adam Carrington."

Still using the name Michael Torrance, Adam travels to Denver in "The Roof", and checks into the La Mirada Hotel. He meets a beautiful woman in "The Wedding", and while they flirt with each other and share a kiss, she playfully refuses to tell him her name. Adam first goes to meet Blake, who assumes that he is a con artist who saw the TV broadcast. Stunned by Blake's abrupt rejection, Adam leaves without showing him the baby rattle. In "The Will", Adam meets Alexis. She immediately accepts him as her lost child, and they have an emotional reunion. When Alexis introduces Adam to his sister Fallon, they are shocked—she is the woman from the hotel. Adam is not bothered by their close-call with incest, but notices that it troubles Fallon. Alexis and Adam also visit a doubtful Blake, who gradually accepts the idea that Adam could be his son. Alexis offers Adam, a lawyer, a job at ColbyCo. Adam is jealous when she also recruits Fallon's husband Jeff Colby, so Adam has Jeff's office painted with toxic paint. Gradually, Jeff's behavior becomes increasingly erratic. In "Madness", Alexis sends Jeff away on a vacation. Realizing that Jeff will "recover" when he's not breathing toxic fumes every day, Adam confesses to Alexis. She orders Adam to have the paint removed. He warns his mother that if she betrays him, he will implicate her in the scheme, since Alexis used Jeff's poor health to trick him into signing over his son's shares in Denver-Carrington to her. Blake and his wife Krystle are suspicious of Alexis when they learn from Jeff's doctors that there is poison in his bloodstream. Fallon, however, suspects Adam, and vows to learn the truth. She notes that Adam is distressed that his family doctor from Billings is in Denver for a conference. Fallon questions Dr. Edwards, who reveals that Adam once won a court case that involved poisoning by toxic paint fumes.

During this time, Adam is attracted to Kirby, Jeff and Fallon's nanny and the daughter of the Carrington majordomo, Joseph. Jeff protects Kirby from Adam's unwanted advances, increasing tension between the two men. In "The Search", a drunken Adam rapes Kirby. Adam attacks Kirby again in "Reunion in Singapore", but she is rescued by Jeff, who proposes to her.

==== Season 4 ====
In "The Hearing", Alexis warns Adam that he is on his own if Fallon learns the truth about Jeff's illness. Adam then tricks Alexis into signing documents that make it look like she ordered the office to be painted. Alexis travels to Montana to investigate Adam's background and learns from Dr. Edwards that Adam had experimented with drugs as a teen and suffered a psychotic breakdown. Alexis is somewhat more sympathetic to Adam at this point, feeling guilty that they gave up the search for their lost son so many years ago, and condemning him to such a tragic life. As she does not want his past drug addiction to be widely known, Alexis is resigned to suffer the consequences of his actions. She gives up her control of Denver-Carrington. In "The Proposal", Jeff attacks Adam, telling him that his new wife Kirby is pregnant with Adam's child. Surprised, Adam tells Kirby that he wants to be a father to their baby and the prospect begins to break down his selfish evil ways, awakening a conscience in him. When he learns that Kirby and Jeff plan to divorce, he proposes, and Kirby accepts in "Lancelot". Adam confesses to Blake that he raped Kirby, who is disgusted by his son. Kirby is diagnosed with eclampsia and must be hospitalized. She suffers from seizures and convulsions and doctors are forced to operate. In "A Little Girl", Adam is distressed to learn that their baby girl has not survived. He tells Kirby gently, devastating her. Stunned with grief, Adam apologizes to Blake and Alexis for the pain that he has caused them, also confessing he poisoned Jeff to Blake. He and Kirby decide to proceed with their wedding plans. However, Alexis blackmails Kirby into leaving Adam, who is crushed when Kirby breaks off their engagement and moves to Paris in the season finale, "The Nightmare".

==== Season 5 ====
Adam causes great concern when he unwillingly is duped by Sammy Jo, his former sister-in-law, into helping her kidnap her son, his nephew, Danny. Steven's wife Claudia sympathizes with Adam and encourages him to kidnap the child back, mollifying the situation. Adam is also called upon to defend Alexis against charges that she murdered Mark Jennings. Adam and Alexis's husband Dex Dexter are able to identify Congressman Neal McVane as the killer, and Alexis is acquitted. During this time, Adam mourns the death of his sister Fallon, and discovers that he has another sister, Amanda. Adam also grows closer to Claudia, and steps in to comfort her when her marriage to Steven falls apart. Despite Blake's admonition not to become romantically involved with Claudia, Adam invites her to accompany him to Amanda's wedding to Prince Michael of Moldavia. Adam promises Blake that he will end the relationship after the wedding, which is interrupted by a terrorist attack in "Royal Wedding".

==== Season 6 ====
After they survive the terrorist attack at Amanda's wedding, Adam proposes to Claudia in "The Man". They elope in "The Titans", and a furious Blake disowns Adam and cuts him out of his will. Meanwhile, Claudia pressures Adam to help her acquire an oil well from Blake that she believes is rightfully hers. Adam takes advantage of Blake's health problems—actually caused by Blake being poisoned—to trick him into signing a Power of Attorney. Adam is also working with Denver-Carrington on a pipeline project with Colby Enterprises. When he travels to California for a meeting, he encounters his sister Fallon, who is alive and suffering from amnesia. Fallon becomes hysterical upon meeting Adam, and accuses him of raping her. Jeff is ready to believe her accusation, but upon further counseling, Fallon realizes that her unresolved conflict over her sexual attraction to Adam when they first met was what triggered her mental breakdown and subsequent disappearance and amnesia. As part of his work on the pipeline, Adam attempts to bribe State Senator Bart Fallmont. When Fallmont refuses the bribe, Adam investigates and learns that he is a closeted gay man. Adam leaks stories to the press that Bart is sleeping with Steven, which infuriates his family but ultimately causes Bart to resign, effectively ending any opposition to Adam's pipeline deal. Meanwhile, Claudia has been increasingly obsessed with reclaiming the oil well. When Adam cannot help her, she reveals to Blake that Adam took advantage of his illness. In the season finale "The Choice (a.k.a.) The Vendetta", Claudia accidentally sets fire to her hotel room while Adam drowns his sorrows at the hotel bar.

==== Season 7 ====
Adam escapes the hotel fire, but is devastated to learn that Claudia has perished in the blaze. Working for Alexis at ColbyCo, Adam attempts to seduce his father's assistant, Dana Waring. Dana is furious when she learns Adam has used her, but he convinces her that his feelings for her are true. Adam proposes in "The Birthday". Dana accepts, although in "The Test" it is revealed that Dana has a secret which she fears could come between them. Neal McVane is released from prison in "The Mothers", and tells Adam he has proof that the real Adam Carrington died as a baby. McVane begins blackmailing Adam who, recently reconciled with Blake, is panicked that he will lose everything. Adam feeds McVane insider trading information but his depression causes him to drink heavily. Adam is arrested for drunk driving in "The Shower". In "The Confession", Adam confesses to Blake and Alexis that he has learned he is not their son. Adam plans to leave Denver with Dana, but Blake convinces him not to go. Adam and Dana are married in the season finale, "Shadow Play". Just prior to the wedding, Blake and Alexis present a stunned and grateful Adam with adoption papers—regardless of what McVane says, they consider him to be their son, faults and all.

==== Season 8 ====
On their honeymoon, Adam tells Dana that he wants to start a family. He grows suspicious when Dana keeps avoiding the subject. He follows Dana to her doctor and is crushed to learn that Dana is unable to have children. They decide to hire a surrogate mother, and meet Karen Atkinson in "The Surrogate". After she becomes pregnant, Adam showers Karen with presents and affection, making Dana feel excluded. Meanwhile, Adam finds himself in conflict with his mother's new husband, Sean Rowan. Sean is hell-bent on destroying all the Carringtons, and blackmails Dana, who must eventually confess her secret to Adam. She cannot have children due to a botched abortion during high school; it turns out that she was a schoolmate of Adam's in Billings, and they slept together during one of Adam's drunken blackouts, leaving him with no memory of the encounter. Adam is stunned and reacts badly, accusing Dana of killing his child. Adam turns to Karen for comfort. Eventually, Adam forgives Dana and threatens to kill Sean if he hurts Dana again. Undaunted, Sean pays Karen's ex-husband, Jesse, to reconcile with her, throwing the surrogacy into question. Adam attempts to bribe Jesse to leave town, but Sean forces him to stay. After the baby is born in "Adam's Son", Karen tells Adam that she and Jesse want to keep the baby. In "The Scandal", Adam learns that McVane's story was fabricated, and Adam really is Blake and Alexis's son. Karen sues for custody, and during the trial, Alexis reveals that Sean bribed Karen and Jesse. Dana sympathizes with Karen and states that Karen is the rightful mother. Adam moves out of their bedroom. Just before the end of the trial, the baby is kidnapped. Adam is the primary suspect, but he and Steven discover that Sean is the kidnapper and are able to rescue the baby. In the season finale "Colorado Roulette", custody is awarded to Karen and Jesse.

==== Season 9 ====
A drunk and depressed Adam alienates his family. Dana leaves Adam and moves away from Denver. Adam continues his manipulative ways, attempting to double-cross Jeff on their pipeline work by sleeping with Steven's former secretary, Claire. Adam also seduces Virginia, Krystle's cousin, who shares a mysterious past with Dex. Adam learns that Virginia was a prostitute and humiliates her into leaving Denver. When Dex learns of Adam's actions, they come to blows. Dex tells Blake about Adam's behavior, causing a rift between father and son. Adam also flirts with Joanna Sills, Sable Colby's vice-president of mergers and acquisitions, in an attempt to help his mother with her vendetta against Sable. Blake eventually fires Adam, who returns to ColbyCo and offers Joanna a job when Sable fires her. Adam assists Alexis in investigating a mysterious mine on the Carrington property, where a 20-year-old dead body was recently found. Adam discovers a witness who claims he saw Blake put the body in the mine. Adam passes this information to Blake, and then finds the witness dead just moments after seeing Blake leave the witness's apartment. Blake accuses Adam of setting him up, but Adam insists that something more nefarious is going on. As the mystery deepens, Adam and Alexis learn that the mine holds stolen Nazi treasure and artwork. Out of spite, Adam has photographs of Jeff and his half-sister, Monica, doctored to look like they are sharing a romantic moment. In the chaos that follows, Alexis reveals that Monica is not in fact Jeff's sister, only his cousin. In "Catch 22", the final episode of the series, Adam taunts Dex when he learns that Sable is pregnant with Dex's child. The men fight and Dex falls backward into Alexis, sending them both crashing through a railing and falling off a second-story balcony.

==== The Reunion (1991) ====
Three years later, Adam is still working for Alexis, having sold out Denver-Carrington to a foreign cartel while Blake was in jail. After Blake's release and subsequent recontrol of his company, Adam and Blake are reconciled once again. In addition, a remorseful Adam is reunited with Kirby and they once again become engaged.

=== Reception ===
Vernon Scott of the Sun-Sentinel called Adam "the scum of the crop" among soap opera villains, and noted that Thomson "wallows in the evil of his role." He wrote, "Thomson is especially effective as a rotten-to-the-core villain because he plays against type. How could a guy who looks so great be such a slime ball?"

== Reboot ==
Adam Carrington
- Dynasty character
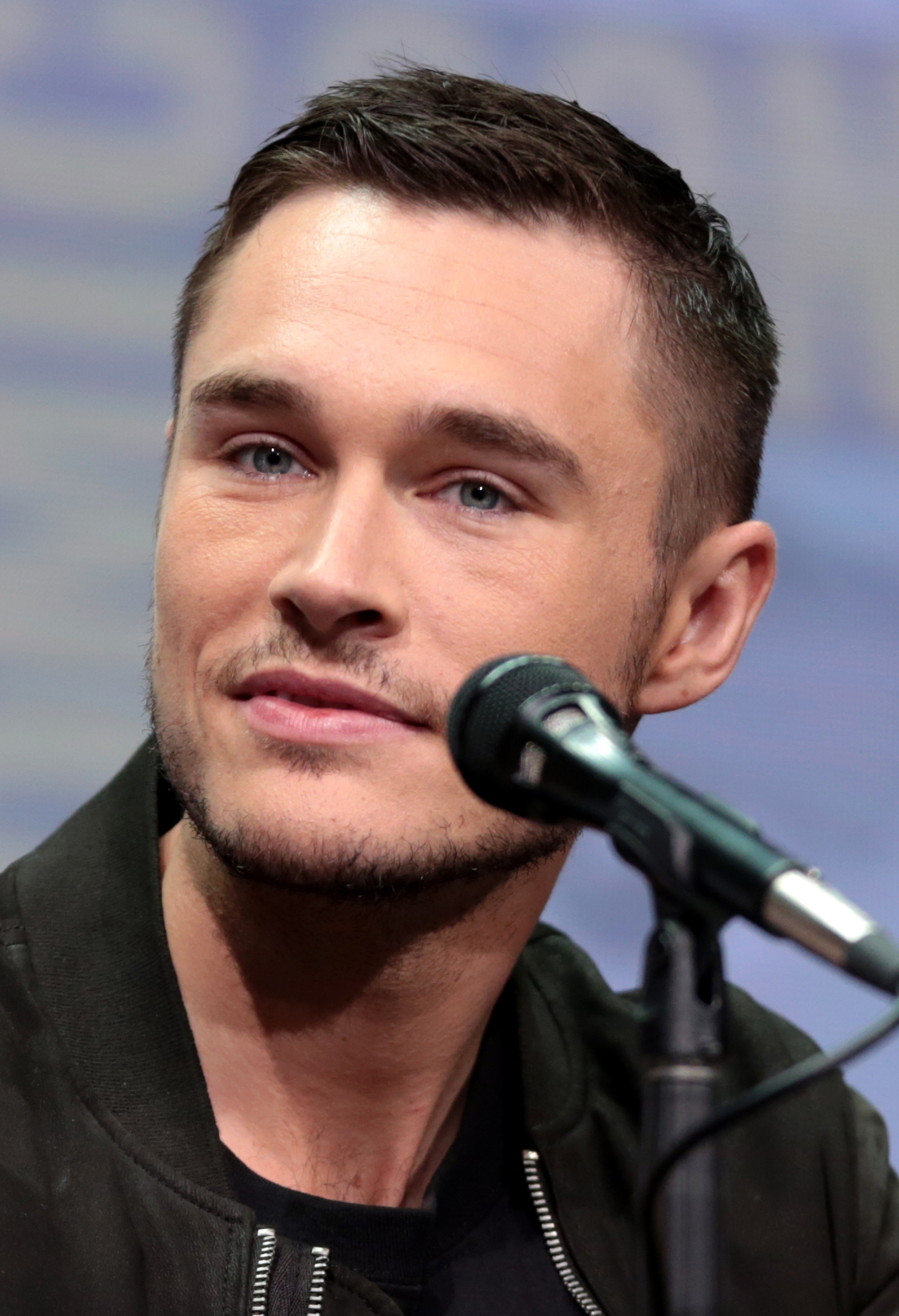
- Sam Underwood portrays Adam Carrington
- Portrayed by: Sam Underwood (2019–2022)
- Duration: 2019−2022
- First appearance: "Parisian Legend Has It..." (2019)
- Last appearance: "Catch 22" (2022)
- Created by: Sallie Patrick; Richard and Esther Shapiro
In-universe information
- Other names: Michael Gordon Harrison; George Emerson; Doctor Kerlan
- Occupation: Veterinarian; Businessman; Hospital Chief of Staff
- Father: Blake Carrington
- Mother: Alexis Colby
- Sisters: Fallon Carrington Colby; Amanda Carrington
- Half-brothers: Steven Carrington
- Grandparents: Thomas Carrington; Evelyn Carrington
- Aunts and uncles: Ben Carrington; Dominique Deveraux
- Nieces and nephews: Lauren Carrington-Ridley
- First cousins: Jeff Colby; Monica Colby; Juliette Carrington

=== Appearances ===
A Dynasty reboot premiered on The CW on October 11, 2017. Brent Antonello debuted as the long-lost Adam / Hank Sullivan in the 2018 episode "A Line from the Past", but the character is later revealed to be an imposter. Sam Underwood began playing the real Adam in the 2019 episode "Parisian Legend Has It...".

=== Characterization ===
Underwood's costar Adam Huber, who plays Liam Ridley in the series, summed up the character: "It's Adam Carrington; he's always got something up his sleeve".

=== Storylines ===
==== Season one ====
Fallon (Elizabeth Gillies) is kidnapped in the January 2018 episode "I Answer to No Man", prompting Blake (Grant Show) to confide in his wife Cristal (Nathalie Kelley) that he and Alexis had a son before Steven and Fallon. The baby, Adam, was kidnapped at six months old and never returned due to a trigger-happy police officer ruining the ransom exchange. In "Don't Con a Con Artist", Alexis (Nicollette Sheridan) tells Steven (James Mackay) about Adam, and admits that she spent all of her money trying to find him. A tip from Alexis leads Steven to El Paso in "A Line from the Past", where he finds Adam living under the name Hank Sullivan (Brent Antonello). In "Trashy Little Tramp", Steven brings Hank / Adam home, but Blake refuses to accept him. Hank's missing finger convinces Blake that he is Adam, but Hank is actually Alexis' lover with whom she is conspiring to amass enough Carrington Atlantic shares to seize control of the company. Cristal discovers the ruse in "Dead Scratch", and Hank flees the mansion with an unhinged and pregnant Claudia Blaisdel (Brianna Brown).

==== Season two ====
Hank is the prime suspect in Cristal's murder, and blackmails Alexis in "Twenty-Three Skidoo", threatening to expose their plan. He also reveals that he started the fire. Hank tries to sell the Rembrandt that Alexis gave him as collateral in "Queen of Cups", but she intervenes to keep him away from Blake. Claudia then berates Hank for his failure to get the money. In "That Witch", Hank cuts Claudia out of his payoff from Alexis. Realizing that Claudia is unhinged, he takes her baby, Matthew, and leaves him on Alexis's doorstep.

In advance of the second season, executive producer Sallie Patrick said, "We can assume there's a real Adam out there. I don't want to confirm or deny that at this point in time, but yes. He could be dead, but...He could still be out there somewhere."

In "Parisian Legend Has It...", Fallon and Steven's new husband Sam (Rafael de la Fuente) fly to Paris to see Steven, who they suspect may be having a drug-induced breakdown. Steven tells them that his friend George has been staying with him, but Fallon and Sam become convinced that Steven is imagining George. They check Steven into an institution; when they are gone, George appears, and tells a sedated Steven that he has been gaslighting and manipulating him. George is the real Adam Carrington, bent on claiming what is his in Atlanta. In "Motherly Overprotectiveness", Adam introduces himself to the family at Carrington Manor with a silver rattle Blake recognizes. Six months earlier in Billings, Montana, his mother Theresa had confessed that he is not Mike Harrison as he always believed, but is really the kidnapped Adam Carrington. Fallon is dubious, Blake immediately believes the newcomer is Adam, and Alexis clings to her story that Hank is their son. Fallon offers Adam $50 million to go away; he refuses, and takes a DNA test with Blake. Fallon and Sam go to Billings and learn that Mike lost his medical license for stealing narcotics. The DNA proves that Mike is Adam, and Fallon reveals Adam's secret to Blake. Adam explains that he stole the drugs for his ailing mother, but does not tell the others that he euthanized Theresa. Adam confronts Alexis with proof that she orchestrated Hank's arrival and fake DNA test; she explains that she was desperate, and apologizes. Adam offers to keep the secret, but then pushes Alexis's face into her fireplace.
