= List of The Colbys episodes =

The Colbys is an American prime time television soap opera that originally aired on ABC from November 20, 1985, to March 26, 1987. Produced by Aaron Spelling, it was a spin-off of Dynasty, which had been the highest rated series for the 1984–1985 U.S. television season. The Colbys revolves around another vastly wealthy, upper-class family, who are relatives by marriage to the Carringtons of Dynasty and who own a large multinational conglomerate. It stars Charlton Heston as billionaire Jason Colby, Barbara Stanwyck as his sister Constance, Stephanie Beacham as Jason's wife Sable, and John James and Emma Samms as their Dynasty characters Jeff Colby and Fallon Carrington. Designed to be bigger than the original show, The Colbys was ultimately a ratings disappointment, and was cancelled after two seasons and 49 episodes.

== Series overview ==
Season	Episodes	Originally released		Rank	Rating
Season	Episodes	First released	Last released	Rank	Rating
1	24	November 20, 1985	May 22, 1986	35	15.50
2	25	September 24, 1986	March 26, 1987	64	11.90

== Episodes ==
=== Season 1 (1985–86) ===
No. overall	No. in season	Title	Directed by	Written by	Original release date	Viewers (millions)
1	1	"The Celebration"	Jerome Courtland	William Bast & Paul Huson	November 20, 1985	22.3
2	2	"Conspiracy of Silence"	Curtis Harrington	Story by : William Bast & Paul Huson; Teleplay by : Dennis Turner	November 27, 1985	19.3
Originally scheduled for November 21, 1985. On that day, The Colbys was preempted by a speech from President Ronald Reagan. As a result, this episode aired in Dynasty's usual timeslot at 9:00 p.m., while that night's episode of Dynasty, "The Proposal", aired at 10:00 p.m.
3	3	"Moment of Truth"	Nancy Malone	William Bast & Paul Huson	November 28, 1985	13.0
4	4	"Family Album"	Don Medford	Story by : William Bast & Paul Huson; Teleplay by : Rick Edelstein	December 5, 1985	14.8
5	5	"Shadow of the Past"	Harry Falk	Story by : William Bast & Paul Huson; Teleplay by : Dennis Turner	December 12, 1985	15.0
6	6	"A House Divided"	Don Medford	Story by : William Bast & Paul Huson; Teleplay by : Frank Furino	December 19, 1985	14.8
7	7	"The Reunion"	Jerome Courtland	Story by : William Bast & Paul Huson; Teleplay by : Frank Furino	December 26, 1985	15.9
8	8	"Fallen Idol"	Harry Falk	Story by : William Bast & Paul Huson; Teleplay by : Oliver Clark	January 2, 1986	14.6
9	9	"The Letter"	Don Medford	Story by : William Bast & Paul Huson; Teleplay by : Doris Silverton	January 9, 1986	13.6
10	10	"The Turning Point"	Gwen Arner	Story by : William Bast & Paul Huson; Teleplay by : Charles Pratt Jr	January 16, 1986	13.9
11	11	"Thursday's Child"	Kim Friedman	Story by : William Bast & Paul Huson; Teleplay by : Rick Edelstein	January 30, 1986	16.8
The Colbys was preempted by the ABC Thursday Night Movie Grease 2 on January 23, 1986, which stars Maxwell Caulfield.
12	12	"The Pact"	Harry Falk	Story by : William Bast & Paul Huson; Teleplay by : Dennis Turner	February 6, 1986	15.0
13	13	"Fallon's Choice"	Curtis Harrington	Story by : William Bast & Paul Huson; Teleplay by : E. Doris Silverton	February 13, 1986	15.5
14	14	"The Trial"	Robert Scheerer	Story by : William Bast & Paul Huson; Teleplay by : Donald Paul Roos	February 20, 1986	16.2
15	15	"Burden of Proof"	Gabrielle Beaumont	Story by : William Bast & Paul Huson; Teleplay by : Dennis Turner	February 27, 1986	17.6
16	16	"My Father's House"	Curtis Harrington	Story by : William Bast & Paul Huson; Teleplay by : Frank V. Furino	March 6, 1986	17.2
17	17	"The Outcast"	Robert Scheerer	Story by : William Bast & Paul Huson; Teleplay by : Donald Paul Roos	March 13, 1986	15.7
18	18	"The Wedding"	Harry Falk	Story by : William Bast & Paul Huson; Teleplay by : Frank V. Furino	March 20, 1986	19.0
19	19	"The Honeymoon"	Gwen Arner	Story by : William Bast & Paul Huson; Teleplay by : Michael Scheff & Maryanne Kasica	March 27, 1986	14.9
20	20	"Double Jeopardy"	Harry Falk	Story by : William Bast & Paul Huson; Teleplay by : Doris Silverton	April 10, 1986	14.9
The Colbys was preempted by the ABC Thursday Night Movie Diner on April 3, 1986.
21	21	"A Family Affair"	Jerome Courtland	Story by : William Bast & Paul Huson; Teleplay by : Donald Paul Roos	April 17, 1986	15.4
22	22	"The Reckoning"	Harry Falk	Story by : William Bast & Paul Huson; Teleplay by : Dennis Turner	May 1, 1986	14.1
The Colbys was preempted by a repeat of the 1984 ABC Thursday Night Movie Invitation to Hell on April 24, 1986.
23	23	"Anniversary Waltz"	Kim Friedman	Story by : William Bast & Paul Huson; Teleplay by : Donald Paul Roos	May 15, 1986	14.6
The Colbys was preempted by Part 5 of North and South Book II: Love and War on May 8, 1986, which stars Linda Evans from the shows' parent series Dynasty.
24	24	"Checkmate"	Harry Falk	William Bast & Paul Huson	May 22, 1986	15.9

=== Season 2 (1986–87) ===
No. overall	No. in season	Title	Directed by	Written by	Original release date	Viewers (millions)
25	1	"The Gathering Storm"	Harry Falk	William Bast & Paul Huson	September 24, 1986	16.6
26	2	"No Exit"	Gabrielle Beaumont	Story by : William Bast & Paul Huson; Teleplay by : Donald Paul Roos	September 25, 1986	10.2
27	3	"Jason's Choice"	Robert Scheerer	Story by : William Bast & Paul Huson; Teleplay by : Frank V. Furino	October 2, 1986	10.5
28	4	"The Matchmaker"	Harry Falk	Story by : William Bast & Paul Huson; Teleplay by : Dennis Turner	October 16, 1986	9.2
The Colbys was preempted by Game 2 of the 1986 National League Championship Series on October 9, 1986.
29	5	"Something Old, Something New"	Don Medford	Story by : William Bast & Paul Huson; Teleplay by : Donald Paul Roos	October 23, 1986	10.7
30	6	"The Gala"	Gwen Arner	Story by : William Bast & Paul Huson; Teleplay by : Dennis Turner	October 30, 1986	10.0
31	7	"Bloodlines"	Harry Falk	Story by : William Bast & Paul Huson; Teleplay by : Dennis Turner	November 6, 1986	10.0
32	8	"Deceptions"	Curtis Harrington	Story by : William Bast & Paul Huson; Teleplay by : Carol Saraceno	November 13, 1986	10.0
33	9	"And Baby Makes Four"	Gwen Arner	Story by : William Bast & Paul Huson; Teleplay by : Mart Crowley	November 27, 1986	9.9
The Colbys was preempted by NFL Football: Los Angeles Raiders Vs. San Diego Chargers on November 20, 1986.
34	10	"Bid for Freedom"	Harry Falk	Story by : William Bast & Paul Huson; Teleplay by : Dennis Turner	December 4, 1986	12.1
35	11	"Sanctuary"	Don Medford	Story by : William Bast & Paul Huson; Teleplay by : Carol Saraceno	December 11, 1986	11.8
36	12	"Reaching Out"	Linda Day	Story by : William Bast & Paul Huson; Teleplay by : Donald Paul Roos	December 18, 1986	10.9
37	13	"Power Plays"	Harry Falk	Story by : William Bast & Paul Huson; Teleplay by : E. Jeffrey Smith	January 1, 1987	11.9
The Colbys was preempted by The Love Boat: The Christmas Cruise on December 25, 1986.
38	14	"The Legacy"	Richard Kinon	Story by : William Bast & Paul Huson; Teleplay by : Dennis Turner	January 8, 1987	12.1
39	15	"The Home Wrecker"	Curtis Harrington	Story by : William Bast & Paul Huson; Teleplay by : Carol Saraceno	January 15, 1987	12.0
40	16	"Manhunt"	Bruce Bilson	Story by : William Bast & Paul Huson; Teleplay by : Doris Silverton	January 22, 1987	13.4
41	17	"All Fall Down"	Kim Friedman	Story by : William Bast & Paul Huson; Teleplay by : Dennis Turner	January 29, 1987	12.7
42	18	"Guilty Party"	Roy Campanella	Story by : William Bast & Paul Huson; Teleplay by : Dennis Turner	February 5, 1987	13.4
43	19	"Fallon's Baby"	Harry Falk	Story by : William Bast & Paul Huson; Teleplay by : Frank V. Furino	February 12, 1987	13.0
44	20	"Answered Prayers"	Robert Scheerer	Story by : William Bast & Paul Huson; Teleplay by : Donald Paul Roos	February 26, 1987	12.0
The Colbys was preempted by Part 5 of Amerika on February 19, 1987.
45	21	"Return Engagement"	Harry Falk	Story by : William Bast & Paul Huson; Teleplay by : Elliott Lewis	March 5, 1987	11.0
46	22	"Devil's Advocate"	Robert Scheerer	Story by : William Bast & Paul Huson; Teleplay by : Mart Crowley	March 12, 1987	10.8
47	23	"Betrayals"	Harry Falk	Story by : William Bast & Paul Huson; Teleplay by : Carol Saraceno	March 19, 1987	12.8
48	24	"The Dead End"	Richard Kinon	Story by : William Bast & Paul Huson; Teleplay by : Donald Paul Roos	March 25, 1987	16.0
49	25	"Crossroads"	Don Medford	William Bast & Paul Huson	March 26, 1987	13.6

== Ratings ==
The Colbys : U.S. viewers per episode (millions)

Season	Episode number																								
Season	1	2	3	4	5	6	7	8	9	10	11	12	13	14	15	16	17	18	19	20	21	22	23	24	25
1	22.3	19.3	13.0	14.8	15.0	14.8	15.9	14.6	13.6	13.9	16.8	15.0	15.5	16.2	17.6	17.2	15.7	19.0	14.9	14.9	15.4	14.1	14.6	15.9	–
2	16.6	10.2	10.5	9.2	10.7	10.0	10.0	10.0	9.9	12.1	11.8	10.9	11.9	12.1	12.0	13.4	12.7	13.4	13.0	12.0	11.0	10.8	12.8	16.0	13.6

Audience measurement performed by Nielsen Media Research
