= Kim Morgan Greene =

American actress

- Years active: 1983–present

Kim Morgan Greene is an American actress, known for her performance as Channing Carter Colby in the Dynasty spin-off series The Colbys.

Greene played Nicole Love on Another World from 1983 to 1984, and later starred as Channing Carter Colby in season two of The Colbys. Greene appeared as Melissa Cassidy, a late-night radio talk-show host and sex therapist, on the crime drama Silk Stalkings, and played Cloe's mother Katie in the 2007 film Bratz.

In 2002, Greene played Roxie Hart in Chicago at the North Shore Music Theatre outside of Boston. Since 2018, Greene has been a member of the Broadway Theater Project.
