= Blake Carrington =

- Dynasty character
- John Forsythe as Blake Carrington
- Portrayed by: John Forsythe (1981–1991); Grant Show (2017–2022)
- Duration: 1981–1989, 1991, 2017–2022
- First appearance: Original series: "Oil" (1981); Reboot series: "I Hardly Recognized You" (2017)
- Last appearance: Original series: "Catch 22" (1989); Reboot series: "Catch 22" (2022)
- Created by: Richard and Esther Shapiro
- Spin-off appearances: The Colbys (1985–1986); Dynasty: The Reunion (1991); Dynasty (2017–2022)
- Grant Show as Blake Carrington
In-universe information
- Occupation: Entrepreneur; Politician; Original series: Chairman and CEO of Denver-Carrington; Reboot series: CEO of Carrington Atlantic; Co-CEO of Primetime Private Air and Flores Inc.
- Parents: Tom Carrington; Ellen Carrington
- Brothers: Ben Carrington
- Half-sisters: Dominique Deveraux
- Spouse: Alexis Morell; Original series: Krystle Jennings; Reboot series: Celia Machado; Cristal Jennings
- Children: Adam Carrington; Fallon Carrington; Steven Carrington; Amanda Carrington; Original series: Krystina Carrington
- Grandchildren: Original series: L.B. Colby; Lauren Colby; Danny Carrington; Unnamed grandson (via Adam); Reboot series: Lauren Carrington
- Nieces and nephews: Original series: Leslie Carrington; Jackie Deveraux; Reboot series: Jeff Colby; Monica Colby; Juliette Carrington; Unnamed nephew (via Ben)

Blake Alexander Carrington is a fictional character on the ABC television series Dynasty, created by Richard and Esther Shapiro. The role of Blake was originally portrayed by actor John Forsythe from 1981 to 1989. Forsythe returned for the miniseries Dynasty: The Reunion in 1991. In the reboot of the series, Blake is played by Grant Show from 2017 to 2022.

Patriarch of the Carrington family, self-made CEO of monolithic Denver-Carrington, and the principal character of the series, oil tycoon Blake Carrington is initially a ruthless man in both business and family matters. The character soon softens into a more benevolent patriarchal figure due to Forsythe's influence.

== Original series ==
=== Appearances ===
Forsythe originated the role of Blake, playing the character from the first episode of the series in 1981 until its finale in 1989. He returned for the 1991 miniseries, Dynasty: The Reunion. Forsythe is the only actor to appear in every episode of the series.

George Peppard was originally cast as Blake, but ultimately had difficulties dealing with the somewhat unsympathetic role and was replaced with Forsythe.

=== Storylines ===
==== Season one ====
In the series premiere, Denver oil tycoon Blake Carrington marries his secretary Krystle Jennings. Their marriage is strained by her discomfort as she learns about Blake's ruthless side, especially in business. Blake rapes Krystle when she is reluctant to have sex with him. Blake struggles with his daughter Fallon's promiscuity and his son Steven's homosexuality. He catches his son in an embrace with another man, and in a fit of anger pushes them apart. Steven's lover falls, hits his head, and dies. Blake is arrested and charged with murder. In the season finale, a mysterious witness enters the courtroom. Fallon identifies the woman as her mother.

==== Season two ====
Mystery witness Alexis Carrington, Blake's ex-wife and Fallon and Steven's mother, testifies to Blake's violent temper. He is found guilty, but given a suspended sentence. While Blake struggles to save Denver-Carrington from financial troubles, he is thrilled to learn that Krystle is pregnant. Krystle loses her baby in a horse riding accident caused by Alexis. Blake suggests that Krystle meet with his friend, psychiatrist Nick Toscanni, unaware that Nick is seeking revenge against him. Later, Blake is blinded after mobster Logan Rhinewood bombs his car. Blake come to suspect that Krystle is having an affair with Nick, so after his sight returns he continues to feign blindness in order spy on her. In the season finale, he confronts Nick, who leaves an unconscious Blake for dead on a remote mountainside.

==== Season three ====
Krystle finds Blake and gets him help. Later Blake learns that Fallon's son, his namesake "Little Blake" Colby, has been kidnapped. Blake and Alexis make a televised plea for the return of their infant grandson, and on-air Alexis confesses a dark secret from their past: their firstborn son, Adam, had been kidnapped as a baby and was never recovered. Traumatized by the event, they had hidden his existence from their subsequent children Fallon and Steven. Weeks later, attorney Michael Torrance from Billings, Montana approaches Blake and claims to be Adam. Though Alexis believes him, Blake does not, but he eventually accepts Adam as his son. Blake and Krystle learn that her divorce from her first husband was never filed. Their relationship deteriorates, until Blake and Krystle separate. Steven is missing and presumed dead in an oil rig explosion, but Blake refuses to believe that his son is dead. When Steven's ex-wife Sammy Jo, Krystle's niece, appears with a baby that she says is Steven's, Blake offers to keep the child. Later, he learns that Steven is alive, and flies to Singapore to convince him to return to Denver. In the third-season finale, Blake learns that Steven is living with another man, and decides to sue for custody of his grandson.

==== Season four ====
Blake loses his custody fight when Steven marries Claudia Blaisdel. However, father and son reconcile when Blake and Krystle remarry. Still seeking revenge, Alexis enlists Rashid Ahmed to sabotage a deal he has with Blake. Blake is broken.

==== Season five ====
Blake manages to save his company, but he mourns Fallon's death in a plane crash. Blake also learns that he has an illegitimate half-sister, Dominique Deveraux. He accepts his sister after his father, Tom Carrington, admits on his deathbed that she is his daughter. A few months later, Blake learns that Alexis had another child after they divorced, a daughter she named Amanda. Although Alexis initially denies that he is Amanda's father, Blake eventually learns that she is, in fact, his daughter. At Christmas, Blake is thrilled when Krystle has a baby girl they name Krystina. Although her health is fragile at first, she survives and thrives. Blake grows jealous of Krystle's friendship with playboy Daniel Reece. Meanwhile, Lady Ashley Mitchell attempts to seduce Blake. Someone has photos taken of both Blake with Ashley and Krystle with Daniel, and sends them to the other spouse. However, Blake and Krystle declare their love for each other. The entire family attends the wedding of Amanda and Prince Michael of Moldavia, and rebels storm the chapel and spray the church with bullets.

==== Season six ====
Blake and his family survive the attack. Upon returning to Denver, Blake enters a business deal with Jason Colby, and is shocked to discover that Fallon is alive, suffering from amnesia, and married to Jason's son, Miles. Krystle is kidnapped by Joel Abrigore and replaced with a look-alike named Rita Lesley, who slowly poisons him on Joel's orders. Blake's health deteriorates until he is almost completely incapacitated. Sammy Jo learns the truth and helps Krystle escape captivity. Joel and Rita disappear. Blake is furious when his brother Ben returns to Denver. In league with Alexis, Ben sues for his share of their late father's estate. Blake mortgages his house and holdings, expecting to gain control over ColbyCo. Thanks to Ben and Alexis's interference, he loses everything, including his lucrative South China Sea oil leases. In the season finale, he learns that Alexis has bought his house. Furious, he grabs her by the throat and starts to strangle her.

==== Season seven ====
Krystle pulls Blake off of Alexis. Blake learns that his hotel, La Mirage, has burned down and that several people, including Claudia, have perished in the fire. Blake is charged with arson, but eventually the charges are dropped when it is revealed that Claudia was responsible for the blaze. As Blake continues to try to regain his empire, he discovers that the land he inherited from his mother is rich in natural gas. However, he is forced to temporarily halt his plans to develop on the land when Alexis and Ben learn of its existence. Soon after, Emily Fallmont gives incriminating information about Alexis and Ben to Blake, who uses it to force them to relinquish their ownership of Denver-Carrington and all its holdings back to him, including the South China Sea oil leases. Later, Blake, Alexis, and Ben are in southeast Asia inspecting an oil rig when it catches fire. Ben rescues a trapped Blake moments before the rig explodes, which eventually leads to their reconciliation. Blake awakens in the hospital with no memories of the last 25 years. Alexis has him discharged from the hospital and convinces him that they are still married. However, when Krystle finds them, Blake's memories return. Blake and Krystle's daughter, Krystina, falls ill and needs a heart transplant. A donor is found and Krystina is saved, but the donor's mother, Sarah Curtis, kidnaps Krystina. She is later recovered, unharmed. In the season finale, Blake and Alexis legally adopt Adam.

==== Season eight ====
Blake runs for governor, opposed by the incumbent and Alexis. After a long and grueling campaign, both he and Alexis lose. Not long after, Blake returns home to find his bedroom in disarray and Krystle missing. He says, "Oh, Krystle, I thought we had more time!"

==== Season nine ====
Krystle has a serious brain tumor and must have risky surgery. They fly to Switzerland, where the surgery is successful, but Krystle is left in a coma. A body is found at the bottom of a lake on the Carrington property. It turns out to be Roger Grimes, the man with whom Alexis was having the affair that caused her and Blake's divorce. Roger has been dead for 20 years, but the cold temperatures in the lake preserved his body. Ultimately, it is revealed that 8-year-old Fallon had shot Roger after finding him beating Alexis, and Blake's late father Tom had hidden the body in a mine under the lake to protect Fallon. The situation is complicated by the fact that the mine is full of stolen Nazi treasure, hidden there by Tom. In the last episode of the series, Blake learns that the police captain investigating Roger's murder is searching for the treasure. Blake attempts to force a confession. The captain pulls a gun, and they both shoot. Blake is left lying in a pool of blood.

==== The Reunion ====
Three years later, in Dynasty: The Reunion (1991), Blake has fully recovered from his gunshot injury and is being released from jail after being exonerated for the fatal shooting of Captain Handler. Along with his sons, Steven and Adam, and former son-in-law Jeff Colby, Blake attempts to regain control of Denver-Carrington from an international consortium. Krystle returns, having come out of her coma, but has been programmed by the Consortium to assassinate Blake. Her love for Blake proves to be too strong, and breaks the Consortium's control over her.

== Reboot ==
A pilot for a Dynasty reboot for The CW was announced in September 2016, and Grant Show was cast as Blake in March 2017. The new series premiered on The CW on October 11, 2017.

=== Characterization ===
Executive producer Josh Schwartz said that, according to series creator Esther Shapiro, "Blake Carrington was a guy who could run this amazing company, but the one place that he really struggles is running his own family." Showrunner Sallie Patrick described Blake as "a white patriarch who is in a changing world". She noted, "I love Grant Show's warmth when he lies directly to his son's face about having returned the phone. That's just one of the skills that make Blake Carrington the multi-billion dollar magnate that he is." Show said, "Blake Carrington is not just your average soap opera character. He's very complex. He's a protagonist, but a very flawed protagonist. I was intrigued by that."

=== Reception ===
Maureen Ryan of Variety called Grant Show "personable and charismatic" in the role, but noted that "a few corporate moves that are meant to make Blake seem deviously brilliant make him look anything but." She added, "If you’re going to base a show around the machinations of a brilliant and ruthless mastermind, his strokes of genius should seem whipsmart and diabolically genius, not predictable or even puzzling."
