= Coleby Lombardo =

American actor

- Born: Coleby Jason Lombardo; September 7, 1978 (age 46); Los Angeles, California, U.S.
- Occupation: Child actor
- Years active: 1986–1992

Coleby Jason Lombardo (also credited as Coleby Lomardo, born September 7, 1978), is former child actor who appeared in nearly twenty productions. In 1988 he was nominated for Young Artist Award as Best Young Actor - Guest Starring in a Television Drama The Colbys.

== Filmography ==
- 1986 Sledge Hammer! (TV Series) as Kid In Bank
- 1986-1987 The Colbys (TV Series) as Scott Cassidy
- 1987 The Twilight Zone (TV Series) as Evan Wolfe (segment "The Card")
- 1988 Highway to Heaven (TV Series) as John Barnett
- 1988 Heartbeat (TV Series) as Zach
- 1988 L.A. Law (TV Series) as Alexander Brackman
- 1988 The Price of Life (Short) as Young Ned
- 1988 Hooperman (TV Series)
- 1989 thirtysomething (TV Series) as Nicholas
- 1990 Poochinski (TV Short) as Kid With Knife
- 1990 The Rookie as Joey Ackerman
- 1990-1991 China Beach (TV Series) as Lanier Jr.
- 1991 Career Opportunities (voice)
- 1991 American Playhouse (TV Series) as Young Ned
- 1991 Beverly Hills, 90210 (TV Series) as Felix
- 1992 Radio Flyer as Fisher Friend #1
- 1992 The Price She Paid (TV Movie) as R.T. (final film role)
