= Dynasty (1981 TV series) season 3 =

TV series

Dynasty
- Season 3
- No. of episodes: 24

Release
- Original network: ABC
- Original release: October 27, 1982 – April 20, 1983

Season chronology
- ← Previous; Season 2 Next → Season 4

The third season of Dynasty originally aired in the United States on ABC from October 27, 1982, through April 20, 1983. The series, created by Richard and Esther Shapiro and produced by Aaron Spelling, revolves around the Carringtons, a wealthy family residing in Denver, Colorado.

Season three stars John Forsythe as millionaire oil magnate Blake Carrington; Linda Evans as his wife Krystle; Pamela Sue Martin as Blake and Alexis' headstrong daughter Fallon; Jack Coleman as Blake and Alexis' earnest son Steven; Gordon Thomson as Blake and Alexis' eldest son Adam; John James as Fallon's ex-husband Jeff Colby; Lloyd Bochner as Jeff's uncle, Cecil Colby; Pamela Bellwood as Claudia Blaisdel, the widow of Krystle's former lover; Heather Locklear as Krystle's niece and Steven's ex-wife Sammy Jo; Geoffrey Scott as Krystle's ex-husband Mark Jennings; Lee Bergere as Carrington majordomo Joseph Anders; Kathleen Beller as Joseph's daughter Kirby; and Joan Collins as Alexis Colby, Blake's ex-wife and the mother of Adam, Fallon and Steven.

== Development ==
In season three, Dynasty introduced Gordon Thomson in the role of Adam Carrington, Blake and Alexis' eldest child, who had been kidnapped as an infant and never found. According to Thomson, "They had planned on Adam being an impostor but they liked him so much they decided to keep him on. They tested me for 13 shows, then extended that to 24." Steven Carrington was recast with Jack Coleman in 1983, the change in appearance attributed to plastic surgery after an oil rig explosion.

Dynasty was ranked #5 in the United States for season three. The April 1983 episode "The Threat", which features the first use of the word "bitch" in a prime time network series as well as a catfight between Krystle and Alexis in a lily pond, was ranked #67 on the 2009 TV Guide list of "Top 100 Episodes".

== Plot ==
In the third season, Alexis marries Cecil on his deathbed and acquires his company, ColbyCo. In the meantime, Adam, the long-lost son of Alexis and Blake who had been kidnapped in infancy, reappears in Denver and almost starts an affair with Fallon before they discover they are siblings. Also introduced are Krystle's ex-husband, tennis pro Mark Jennings, and Kirby Anders, the daughter of longtime Carrington majordomo Joseph. Kirby catches Adam's eye but weds Jeff after his divorce from Fallon. In the middle of the season, news that Steven has been killed in an accident in Indonesia comes to the Carringtons; he survives, but undergoes plastic surgery and returns to Denver. In the third-season cliffhanger, Alexis lures Krystle to Steven's cabin and the two are locked inside while the cabin is set ablaze by an unseen arsonist.

== Cast ==
=== Main ===
- John Forsythe as Blake Carrington
- Linda Evans as Krystle Carrington
- Pamela Sue Martin as Fallon Carrington
- Pamela Bellwood as Claudia Blaisdel (Note: Bellwood and Bochner depart in "The Wedding" (ep. 3.3). Bellwood returns to the opening credits for "The Dinner" (ep. 3.22).)
- John James as Jeff Colby
- Lloyd Bochner as Cecil Colby
- Gordon Thomson as Adam Carrington
- Kathleen Beller as Kirby Anders (Note: Beller is added to the opening credits from "Kirby" (ep. 3.7).)
- Geoffrey Scott as Mark Jennings (Note: Scott first appears uncredited in "The Siblings" (ep. 3.5) before being added to the opening credits from "Mark" (ep. 3.6).)
- Heather Locklear as Sammy Jo Carrington (Note: Locklear returns to the opening credits for "Samantha" (ep. 3.12), "Danny" (ep. 3.13) and "The Downstairs Bride" (ep. 3.20).)
- Jack Coleman as Steven Carrington (Note: Coleman first appears uncredited with his face unseen in "Acapulco" (ep. 3.9). He continues in a recurring role before being added to the opening credits from "Reunion in Singapore" (ep. 3.18).)
- Lee Bergere as Joseph Anders
- Joan Collins as Alexis Carrington

=== Recurring ===
- Paul Burke as Neal McVane
- James Hong as Dr. Chen Ling
- Christine Belford as Susan Farragut
- Virginia Hawkins as Jeanette Robbins
- Betty Harford as Hilda Gunnerson
- Hank Brandt as Morgan Hess
- Grant Goodeve as Chris Deegan

=== Notable guest stars ===
- Peter Mark Richman as Andrew Laird
- David Hedison as Sam Dexter
- Joanne Linville as Claire Maynard
- Simon MacCorkindale as Billy Dawson
- Tim O'Connor as Thomas Crayford
- Kabir Bedi as Farouk Ahmed

Cast notes

== Episodes ==
No. overall	No. in season	Title	Directed by	Written by	Original release date	Prod. code	Rating/share (households)
38	1	"The Plea"	Irving J. Moore	Story by : Eileen and Robert Mason Pollock; Teleplay by : Edward De Blasio	October 27, 1982	DY-036	25.6/43
Dynasty was preempted by the ABC Movie Special Having It All on October 13, 1982.
39	2	"The Roof"	Gwen Arner	Story by : Eileen and Robert Mason Pollock; Teleplay by : Edward De Blasio	November 3, 1982	DY-037	23.2/40
40	3	"The Wedding"	Irving J. Moore	Story by : Eileen and Robert Mason Pollock; Teleplay by : Jeffery Lane	November 10, 1982	DY-038	25.8/43
41	4	"The Will"	Gwen Arner	Story by : Eileen Mason and Robert Pollock; Teleplay by : Katherine Coker	November 17, 1982	DY-039	19.6/31
42	5	"The Siblings"	Irving J. Moore	Story by : Eileen Mason and Robert Pollock; Teleplay by : Daniel King Benton	November 24, 1982	DY-040	19.1/32
43	6	"Mark"	Philip Leacock	Story by : Eileen Mason and Robert Pollock; Teleplay by : Edward De Blasio	December 1, 1982	DY-041	20.6/32
44	7	"Kirby"	Irving J. Moore	Story by : Eileen Mason and Robert Pollock; Teleplay by : Edward De Blasio	December 8, 1982	DY-042	21.2/35
45	8	"La Mirage"	Irving J. Moore	Story by : Eileen Mason and Robert Pollock; Teleplay by : Stephen Black & Henry Stern	December 15, 1982	DY-043	21.3/35
46	9	"Acapulco"	Philip Leacock	Story by : Eileen Mason and Robert Pollock; Teleplay by : Leah Markus	December 22, 1982	DY-044	21.5/36
47	10	"The Locket"	Jerome Courtland	Story by : Eileen Mason and Robert Pollock; Teleplay by : Dick Nelson	December 29, 1982	DY-045	19.3/32
48	11	"The Search"	Alf Kjellin	Story by : Eileen Mason and Robert Pollock; Teleplay by : Edward De Blasio	January 5, 1983	DY-046	22.5/40
49	12	"Samantha"	Bob Sweeney	Story by : Eileen Mason and Robert Pollock; Teleplay by : Edward De Blasio	January 12, 1983	DY-047	22.9/37
50	13	"Danny"	Alf Kjellin	Story by : Eileen Mason and Robert Pollock; Teleplay by : Dick Nelson	January 19, 1983	DY-048	21.8/35
51	14	"Madness"	Irving J. Moore	Story by : Eileen Mason and Robert Pollock; Teleplay by : Stephen Kandel	January 26, 1983	DY-049	26.3/40
52	15	"Two Flights to Haiti"	Jerome Courtland	Story by : Eileen and Robert Mason Pollock; Teleplay by : Edward De Blasio	February 2, 1983	DY-050	24.3/37
53	16	"The Mirror"	Philip Leacock	Story by : Eileen Mason and Robert Pollock; Teleplay by : Edward De Blasio	February 16, 1983	DY-051	20.9/36
Dynasty was preempted by part 4 of The Winds of War on February 9, 1983.
54	17	"Battle Lines"	Jerome Courtland	Story by : Eileen Mason and Robert Pollock; Teleplay by : Dick Nelson	February 23, 1983	DY-052	21.5/34
55	18	"Reunion in Singapore"	Gwen Arner	Story by : Eileen Mason and Robert Pollock; Teleplay by : Edward De Blasio	March 2, 1983	DY-053	22.5/27
56	19	"Fathers and Sons"	Jerome Courtland	Story by : Eileen Mason and Robert Pollock; Teleplay by : Edward De Blasio	March 9, 1983	DY-054	25.2/43
57	20	"The Downstairs Bride"	Philip Leacock	Story by : Eileen Mason and Robert Pollock; Teleplay by : Dick Nelson	March 16, 1983	DY-055	22.0/35
58	21	"The Vote"	Glynn R. Turman	Story by : Eileen Mason and Robert Pollock; Teleplay by : Edward De Blasio	March 23, 1983	DY-056	24.6/46
59	22	"The Dinner"	Philip Leacock	Story by : Eileen and Robert Mason Pollock; Teleplay by : Edward De Blasio	April 6, 1983	DY-057	22.5/38
Dynasty was preempted by part 4 of The Thorn Birds on March 30, 1983.
60	23	"The Threat"	Bob Sweeney	Story by : Eileen Mason and Robert Pollock; Teleplay by : Edward De Blasio	April 13, 1983	DY-058	23.2/39
This episode features the first use of the word "bitch" in a prime time network series. Note: In 1996, the episode was ranked #84 on TV Guide's list of "The 100 Most Memorable Moments in TV History", and was ranked #67 on the 2009 TV Guide list of "Top 100 Episodes".
61	24	"The Cabin"	Irving J. Moore	Story by : Eileen and Robert Mason Pollock; Teleplay by : Edward De Blasio	April 20, 1983	DY-059	27.3/45

== Reception ==
In season three, Dynasty made a big leap to be ranked #5 in the United States with a 22.4 Nielsen rating.
