= New Lady in Town =

"New Lady in Town" may refer to:

- "New Lady in Town" (Dynasty 1981), an episode of the 1981 prime time soap opera Dynasty
- "New Lady in Town" (Dynasty 2017), an episode of the 2017 reboot series Dynasty
