= Carrington family =

Core family in the soap opera Dynasty

- Dynasty family
- Clockwise from top left: John James, Heather Locklear, Jack Coleman, Gordon Thomson, Leann Hunley, Linda Evans, John Forsythe, Joan Collins, and Emma Samms.
- First appearance: "Oil" (pilot); January 12, 1981
- Created by: Richard and Esther Shapiro
- Duration: Original series: January 12, 1981–October 22, 1991; Reboot series: October 11, 2017–September 16, 2022

The Carringtons are the core family of the American prime time soap opera Dynasty, which aired on ABC from January 12, 1981 to May 11, 1989. The series was followed up by a two-part miniseries entitled Dynasty: The Reunion in October 1991. A Dynasty reboot premiered on The CW on October 11, 2017.

== Appearances ==
Dynasty premiered on ABC on January 12, 1981, starring John Forsythe as millionaire oil tycoon Blake Carrington for the entire run of the series. The drama centered on patriarch Blake and his wives, children, and extended family. The original run of Dynasty ended in May 1989. Dynasty: The Reunion, a miniseries to wrap up storylines left unfinished by the show's cancellation, aired in October 1991.

A Dynasty reboot premiered on The CW on October 11, 2017, starring Grant Show as Blake and again focusing on him and his dysfunctional family.

== Storylines ==
=== Original series ===
As Dynasty begins in 1981, Carrington heirs Steven (Al Corley) and Fallon (Pamela Sue Martin) return to Denver to attend the wedding of their father, powerful oil tycoon Blake Carrington (John Forsythe), to his former secretary, Krystle (Linda Evans). The Carrington family dynamic is soon established; thoughtful and sensitive Steven resists his father's pressure to step into his role as future leader of Blake's empire, while his spoiled sister Fallon, better suited to follow in Blake's footsteps, is underestimated by and considered little more than a trophy to Blake. Steven befriends Krystle, who is adjusting to life at the mansion despite chilly receptions from Fallon and the Carrington majordomo, Joseph Anders (Lee Bergere).

Blake's ex-wife Alexis (Joan Collins) appears in the second season and soon stirs up trouble for the family. In 1982, their infant grandson L.B. Colby, the son of Fallon and Jeff Colby (John James) is kidnapped. Former spouses Blake and Alexis make a televised plea that he be returned, and Alexis confesses a dark secret from their past: their firstborn son, Adam (Gordon Thomson), had been kidnapped as a baby and never recovered. Traumatized by the event, they had hidden his existence from their subsequent children Fallon and Steven. Meanwhile, in Billings, Montana, an old woman named Kate Torrance tearfully tells her grandson Michael that he is really the Carrington heir. Armed with items from Adam Carrington's baby carriage, lawyer "Michael" comes to Denver and is eventually accepted as a Carrington, but his selfishness, greed and ambition put him at odds with all of his relatives at one time or another.

Steven leaves town that year and is presumed dead in an oil rig explosion in 1982; he turns up alive and returns (portrayed by Jack Coleman) in 1983. Fallon leaves town in 1984 and is also later presumed dead in a plane crash. At the same time, chanteuse Dominique Deveraux (Diahann Carroll) comes to Denver and soon makes a shocking claim: she is the daughter of Blake's father Tom Carrington (Harry Andrews) and his longtime mistress. Later in 1984 a young woman named Amanda Bedford (Catherine Oxenberg) appears on Alexis's doorstep; she is Alexis's youngest daughter, (Note: Amanda's arrival is foreshadowed in the season four episode "The Birthday" when Alexis mentions that she has been through four pregnancies. Krystle notes the discrepancy (at this time, Alexis is known to have just three children, Adam, Fallon and Steven), but Alexis explains that one resulted in a miscarriage. Amanda appears 11 episodes later in "Amanda".) and it is eventually revealed that Blake is her father. Blake and Krystle also have a daughter, Krystina (Jessica Player), in 1984. Fallon reappears in 1985 (portrayed by Emma Samms).

Alexis brings Blake's vengeful, estranged brother Ben (Christopher Cazenove) to town in 1986 to help her destroy Blake, and Ben's daughter Leslie (Terri Garber) soon follows in 1987. Ben leaves town that year after reconciling with Blake, and Leslie having reconciled with Ben follows suit in 1988 after a failed romance with Clay Fallmont (Ted McGinley), who is possibly also Ben's child.

Carrington family tree (1981–1991)

Ellen; Carrington	Tom; Carrington	Laura; Matthews
Alexis; Morell	Blake; Carrington	Krystle; Grant	Ben; Carrington	Melissa; Saunders	Dominique; Deveraux	Garrett; Boydston
Karen; Atkinson	Adam; Carrington	Fallon; Carrington	Jeff; Colby	Amanda; Carrington	Steven; Carrington	Sammy Jo; Reese	Krystina; Carrington	Leslie; Carrington	Jackie; Deveraux
Unnamed son	L.B. Colby	Lauren; Colby	Danny; Carrington

=== Reboot series ===
In 2017, wealthy siblings Steven (James Mackay) and Fallon Carrington (Elizabeth Gillies) arrive in Atlanta to meet their father's fiancée, Cristal Flores (Nathalie Kelley). Fallon and Cristal set themselves as rivals for Blake's attention, but over time they find common ground over their frustration with his machinations. In the 2018 episode "I Answer to No Man", Blake (Grant Show) reveals to Cristal that he and his first wife had another son, Adam, who was kidnapped at six months old and never returned. Blake's ex-wife Alexis (Nicollette Sheridan), Steven and Fallon's mother, reappears in the "Poor Little Rich Girl" after an extended exile. Alexis tells Steven about Adam, and Steven eventually finds his brother in El Paso, living under the name Hank Sullivan (Brent Antonello). Blake welcomes Adam back in "Trashy Little Tramp", not knowing that Hank is actually Alexis' lover with whom she is conspiring to amass enough Carrington Atlantic shares to seize control of the company. At the same time, Jeff (Sam Adegoke) and Monica Colby (Wakeema Hollis) learn from their grandmother—the former secretary of Blake's father, Thomas Carrington (Bill Smitrovich)—that their mother, Millie, was fathered by Thomas. Jeff and Monica reveal their Carrington heritage in "Dead Scratch"—though Blake is already aware of his half-sister—and declare their intention to force a sale of Carrington Atlantic.

In season two, Blake falls in love with Cristal Jennings (Ana Brenda Contreras). Fallon visits her cousin Juliette Carrington (Mathilde Warnier), the French daughter of Blake's disinherited brother Benjamin. Steven is revealed to be the son of Alexis and Anders (Alan Dale) in "The Butler Did It". The real Adam (Sam Underwood) also reappears, and is immediately welcomed into the family by Blake, though Fallon is wary of him. Blake's half-sister and Jeff and Monica's mother, now going by the name Dominique Deveraux (Michael Michele), arrives in "New Lady in Town".

In season three, Blake marries Cristal (now Daniella Alonso), and Jeff marries Alexis (now Elaine Hendrix) after she returns from receiving facial reconstructive surgery in Europe. Fallon becomes engaged to Liam Ridley (Adam Huber), heir to the infamous Van Kirks, a wealthy family based in New York. Liam is reunited with his supposed long-lost son, Connor (John Jackson Hunter), until it is revealed that Connor is Liam's paternal half-brother. Additionally, Vanessa Deveraux (Jade Payton) is introduced as Dominique's stepdaughter from a later marriage, making her Jeff and Monica's stepsister. Adam starts to date Kirby Anders (Maddison Brown), daughter of Anders and paternal half-sister of Steven.

In season four, Fallon marries Liam and Alexis divorces Jeff. Cristal temporarily leaves Blake, but they ultimately reconcile. Thomas' former mistress, mother of Dominique and grandmother of Jeff and Monica, Lo Cox (Roxzane Mims), passes away in her sleep. Adam considers proposing to Kirby, but they ultimately breakup when the return of her ex-boyfriend causes a drug relapse. With their lives in peril, Alexis and Dominique make final confessions to one another, Alexis revealing that she had another affair that led to the birth of a daughter who she gave to her cousin to be raised in London, and Dominique revealing that she is still legally married to a man that she met after her divorce from Cecil. Alexis' daughter, later revealed to also be Blake's daughter, Amanda Carrington (Eliza Bennett), arrives in "The British Are Coming". Dominique's husband, Brady Lloyd (Randy J. Goodwin), arrives in "Everything Looks Wonderful, Joseph". The revelation of Dominique and Brady's marital status nullifies Dominique's marriage to Vanessa's father, so she is not legally step-family to Dominique, Jeff, and Monica. Toward the end of the season, Fallon and Liam separate.

In season five, Dominique and Brady finalize their divorce, while Fallon and Liam reconcile and try to conceive a child. It is revealed that Fallon is infertile due to her gunshot wound, so the couple seek out a surrogate, Stacey Moore (Samantha Massell), to carry their child. In "How Did the Board Meeting Go?", Alexis reconnects with Blake's former business associate, Dex Dexter (Pej Vahdat), and they are married in "Vicious Vendetta". Additionally, Blake's estranged brother, Ben Carrington (Brett Tucker), crashes Alexis and Dex's wedding to exact his revenge against the Carringtons. In addition, Ben is expecting a child with his fourth wife. Amanda starts to date Kirby, and they take their relationship public during Alexis' wedding. Adam starts to date Fallon and Liam's surrogate, Stacey, but their relationship comes to an end when Stacey discovers that Adam drugged her. Steven makes his grand return in "Catch 22", exiling Adam from the family and rekindling his relationship with Sam. Fallon and Liam also welcome their newborn daughter into the world, Lauren Morrell Carrington-Ridley.

Carrington family tree (2017–2022)

Ellen	Thomas; Carrington	Lo; Cox
Joseph; Anders	Alexis; Morell	Blake; Carrington	Cristal; Flores (Celia Machado)	Ben; Carrington	French heiress	Dominique; Deveraux (Millie)	Cesil; Colby
Blake; Carrington	Cristal; Jennings
Sammy Jo; Jones	Steven; Carrington	Adam; Carrington	Fallon; Carrington	Liam; Ridley	Amanda; Carrington	Juliette; Carrington	Jeff; Colby	Monica; Colby
