= Kirby Anders =

- Dynasty character
- Kathleen Beller as Kirby Anders Colby
- Portrayed by: Kathleen Beller (1982–1991); Maddison Brown (2018–2022)
- Duration: 1982–1984, 1991, 2018–2022
- First appearance: Original series: "Kirby" (1982); Reboot: "Dead Scratch" (2018, face unseen); "Twenty-Three Skidoo" (2018)
- Last appearance: Original series: "The Nightmare" (1984); Reboot: "Catch 22" (2022)
- Created by: Richard and Esther Shapiro
- Spin-off appearances: Dynasty: The Reunion (1991)
- Maddison Brown as Kirby Anders
In-universe information
- Occupation: Original series: Nanny; English–French translator; Reboot series: Businesswoman; Model
- Parents: Joseph Anders; Alicia Anders
- Siblings: Original series: Sean Rowan; Victoria Anders; Reboot series: Steven Carrington (paternal half-brother)
- Spouse: Original series: Jeff Colby; Adam Carrington

Kirby Anders is a fictional character on the ABC prime time soap opera Dynasty. Portrayed by Kathleen Beller from 1982 to 1984, the character was introduced in the seventh episode of the series' third season, but was written out after the fourth season finale. Beller reprised the role for the 1991 miniseries, Dynasty: The Reunion.

In the story, Kirby is the daughter of the Carrington family's majordomo, Joseph Anders. Returning to Denver after years abroad, she becomes involved in a love triangle with Adam Carrington and Jeff Colby, who hate each other.

Kirby is portrayed by Maddison Brown in The CW's Dynasty reboot from 2018 to 2022.

== Original series ==
Kathleen Beller debuted as Kirby in the November 17, 1982 third season episode "Kirby". Her last appearance in the original series was the May 9, 1984, season four finale episode, "The Nightmare". Beller later blamed her departure from Dynasty on the new writers who were hired in 1984, explaining that they had "lost interest in her character" and subsequently did not renew her contract. She said at the time that she would return to the role if the show wanted her.

Beller reprised the role for the 1991 miniseries, Dynasty: The Reunion.

=== Storylines ===
==== Season three ====
Kirby, the daughter of Blake Carrington's majordomo, Joseph Anders, returns to Denver in "Kirby" (1982). Having grown up at the mansion, in recent years, she had been studying in Paris, where she worked as a nanny but left her job after she became romantically involved with her (married) employer. Upon her return, she reconnects with her childhood playmate, Blake's daughter Fallon Carrington. As adults, however, the gulf between rich and poor is more of an impediment to their friendship. In "La Mirage", Fallon hires Kirby to be the nanny for her young son, L.B. Colby. Kirby immediately has eyes for Fallon's husband, Jeff Colby. In "Acapulco", Joseph warns Kirby not to interfere with the troubled marriage. But as Kirby watches Fallon's relationship with Jeff deteriorate—mostly due to Fallon's infidelities—she ingratiates herself with Jeff. During this time, Blake's son Adam Carrington is also attracted to Kirby. Jeff protects Kirby from Adam's unwanted advances, increasing tension between the two men. Adam rapes Kirby in "The Search". He offers her a job in "Two Flights to Haiti", which she declines. Adam attacks Kirby again in "Reunion in Singapore", but she is rescued by Jeff. In the heat of the moment, Jeff (who has recently divorced Fallon) proposes marriage to her. Jeff and Kirby are married in Reno in the next episode, "Fathers and Sons". In the season finale "The Cabin", Kirby learns that she is pregnant and realizes that the child is Adam's, but is afraid to tell Jeff.

==== Season four ====
Joseph commits suicide in the season four episode "The Bungalow", and Kirby is devastated. Blake explains that Joseph had tried to protect him by attempting to kill Blake's ex-wife Alexis Colby in the cabin fire, and when he failed, Joseph shot himself. Kirby suspects there is more to the story. She confronts Alexis in "The Hearing", and then tries to strangle her. Blake manages to stop Kirby. Jeff learns that Kirby is pregnant with Adam's child in "Peter De Vilbis", and attacks Adam in "The Proposal". When Adam learns why, he tells Kirby that he wants to be a father to their baby. Kirby plans to leave Denver but Jeff stops her, though she suggests that they divorce. In "The Wedding", Adam insists that Kirby will tell their child that he is the father, but when he learns that she is divorcing Jeff, he proposes. Kirby accepts in "Lancelot". She is diagnosed with hyperreflexia and hospitalized, after which she suffers from seizures and convulsions, and doctors are forced to operate. In "A Little Girl", Adam learns that Kirby's baby has not survived. Adam and Kirby decide to proceed with their wedding plans. To prevent them from marrying, Adam's mother Alexis offers Kirby a job in Paris. When Kirby refuses, Alexis tells her the real reason Joseph tried to kill her: to prevent her from revealing that Kirby's mother did not die when Kirby was a child—she had been institutionalized. Kirby is shocked. In "The Voice - Part 2", she visits the sanitarium and learns that her mother died a few years before. Investigating further, Kirby finds her father's suicide note in Blake's desk in "The Voice - Part 3". Driven to the brink, Kirby buys a handgun. Kirby tries to kill Alexis in "The Check", but is interrupted. In the season finale "The Nightmare", Kirby pulls a gun on Alexis but cannot bring herself to shoot. Alexis agrees not to press charges if Kirby leaves Denver. Kirby abruptly breaks off her engagement to Adam and leaves town.

==== Season eight ====
Kirby's older brother, Sean Rowan, comes to Denver and marries Alexis, plotting her downfall to avenge his father and sister. Kirby phones Sean and begs him to stop his vendetta but he does not care.

==== The Reunion (1991) ====
Kirby is working in Paris as a translator for the Consortium when she runs into Adam Carrington. Kirby and Adam rekindle their romance as she helps him and Blake regain control of Denver-Carrington. Kirby and Adam announce their plans to marry at the end of the miniseries. While accepting Adam's proposal, Kirby teases Adam about becoming a Carrington so he offers to become an Anders instead, of which she gently disapproves although she is amused by the suggestion.

== Reboot ==
=== Development ===
A Dynasty reboot premiered on The CW on October 11, 2017, featuring Alan Dale as Carrington majordomo Anders. In August 2018, The CW announced that Maddison Brown had been cast as Kirby for the second season.

Before the premiere of season two, executive producer Sallie Patrick previewed, "we will come to see how Anders is keeping [Kirby] at arm's length, because not only do they have a complicated and fraught relationship, but she has an equally fraught relationship with the Carringtons, and Anders being the loyal friend to the family as well as an employee...she jeopardizes many things for him. He loves his daughter, of course, but he also has never felt adequate parenting her, which was why she was living with her mother for some time in Australia."

=== Characterization ===
Regarding Kirby's relationship with Adam, showrunner Josh Reims describes the couple as "two equally damaged people." Following Adam's confession to Kirby in the season four premiere, "some characters would hear that and say they never want to speak to him again, [but] Kirby understands that everyone has demons. She doesn't react as if she's horrified, which is a twist on what you'd expect. She also goes on a pretty crazy path herself this season."

=== Storylines ===
==== Season one ====
In the April 2018 episode "A Line from the Past", Carrington majordomo Joseph Anders (Alan Dale) reveals to Sam Jones (Rafael de la Fuente) that he has a daughter named Kirby, who lives with her mother in Australia. Anders moves to call her, but hangs up. In the season one finale "Dead Scratch", Steven (James Mackay) and Fallon (Elizabeth Gillies) tell Sam that "psychopath" Kirby lived with the Carringtons when she was a child, and tormented Fallon. Sam in turn reveals that he invited Kirby to attend his and Steven's wedding. She later appears at the mansion and greets her father, her face unseen.

==== Season two ====
Anders hides Kirby from the Carringtons in the season two premiere, "Twenty-Three Skidoo". Since she was suspected of arson as a child, Anders wants to keep her out of the way until whoever set the fire at Steven and Sam's wedding is arrested. After Kirby and Anders clash over her wild lifestyle and his mistrust, Kirby goes to stay with Jeff Colby (Sam Adegoke). In "Ship of Vipers", Kirby convinces Monica (Wakeema Hollis) to hire her at Club Colby, later unleashing rats in a rival club to prove loyalty. On opening night, Kirby confronts Fallon and promises revenge for having her sent back to Australia. Fallon has Kirby arrested for assault. Kirby is released in "The Butler Did It" under the condition she attend therapy. There, Kirby unlocks a repressed memory of Anders arguing with Fallon's mother Alexis (Nicollette Sheridan) over a one night stand they once had. Alexis caught Kirby listening in on the conversation and reprimanded her for it, leading Kirby to the revelation that Alexis had framed her for arson, not Fallon. Kirby confronts Anders who goes on to confront Alexis, and Kirby secretly records Alexis confessing that Anders is the father to one of her children. Kirby exposes the affair, and Anders confesses that Steven is his son. In "Snowflakes in Hell", under the pretense that it's Alexis, Kirby steals and racks up debt on Steven's credit card. Having to pay off the debt, Kirby convinces Jeff to let her cater for one of his poker games in "Queen of Cups". She later agrees to be Sam and Steven's surrogate. The surrogacy plan falls through in "That Witch", but Kirby makes amends with Anders, who invites her to move back into the manor. Kirby and Sam grow closer in "A Temporary Infestation" when taking care of L.B., a baby that was found on the Carrington property. They decide to get matching tattoos, leading to them both developing crushes on the tattoo artist and new nanny, Manuel (Yani Gellman), in "A Real Instinct for the Jugular". After L.B. is kidnapped in "Crazy Lady", Kirby rescues him from Manuel, and Anders accepts that Kirby has grown up.

In "The Sight of You", Kirby crashes Fallon's girls' trip and assists in sabotaging Liam's girlfriend Ashley (Taylor Black). Fallon sticks up for Kirby during a barfight and refers to her as a friend. Kirby protects Sam and Fallon in "Filthy Games", exposing guru Lady Monk (Nicole Steinwedell) as a con artist before she is able to scam them. In "Even Worms Can Procreate", Kirby helps Sam on his path to becoming a social media influencer, but they find that his following is more interested in Anders. "Parisian Legend Has It..." features Kirby giving Michael Culhane (Robert Christopher Riley) words of encouragement, and they continue to flirt in "Miserably Ungrateful Men". In addition, Fallon hires Kirby as her millennial content consultant for Femperial Publishing. In "How Two-Faced Can You Get", Kirby suggests feminist writer Gloria Collins (Andrea Bordeaux) as the first author for Fallon's company rebranding. Kirby and Michael agree that they should inform Fallon before letting anything develop between them, but Kirby grows hesitant now that she and Fallon are in a good place. A picture of Kirby and Michael kissing exposes the truth to Fallon, who is only upset because of Kirby's dishonesty. The two make amends, and Kirby asks to be the one to go with Glo on her book tour, having been the one to find her. Kirby returns in "Thicker Than Money", but a fight with Fallon sends her back to Michael. Kirby infiltrates Femperial Publishing's competition for information, resulting in Fallon's apology. Despite making amends with Fallon, Kirby decides to continue seeing Michael. In "Deception, Jealousy, and Lies", Kirby pushes for Anders to stop prioritizing the Carringtons over himself. Fallon sells Femperial Publishing to Kirby for one dollar with intent to take the company back, but Kirby betrays her after learning Fallon told Michael to break up with her.

==== Season three ====
Her friendship with Fallon now severed, Kirby is kicked out of the manor in "Guilt Trip to Alaska", forced to stay in her office at Femperial Publishing. She continues to support Michael during his incarceration, but the relationship officially comes to an end upon his release in "Caution Never Won a War". Kirby's pursues new Atlantix player Victor Diaz (Christian Ochoa), to Michael's dismay in "Mother? I'm at La Mirage". In the meantime, Fallon sabotages Kirby's attempts to find a new CEO to help run Femperial Publishing after her offer to buy back the company is turned down. In "A Used Up Memory", Kirby becomes involved with motivational speaker, Joel Turner (Pierson Fodé). When suspected of working with the prosecution during Blake's murder trial in "The Sensational Blake Carrington Trial", Kirby is once again exiled from Atlanta. She leaves town with Joel, despite Anders' wishes for her to return home. Still unable to reach Kirby in "What Sorrows Are You Drowning?", Anders reaches out to Fallon for help. Kirby has sold Femperial Publishing, and it becomes apparent that Joel is the leader of a cult that Kirby now helps bankroll. Fallon and Adam (Sam Underwood) infiltrate the cult, and Fallon apologizes for how she has treated Kirby. Now living in the manor again, Kirby starts to grow close with Adam in "A Wound That May Never Heal". In a misguided attempt to tell Adam how she feels, Kirby sends him in anonymous invitation to La Mirage's Valentine's Day celebration in "Battle Lines". Embarrassed that Adam assumes the invitation is from his former nurse, Kirby withholds the truth until he accidentally finds out from Sam. Adam is put off by Kirby's deception, but after a violent outburst due to the heartache from his previous relationship, the two embrace in a heated kiss.

Kirby's attraction toward Adam continues in "You See Most Things in Terms of Black & White" despite his hesitance to let their connection grow deeper. Kirby persuades Sam to hire her as La Mirage's event coordinator in "Is the Next Surgery on the House?" where she and Michael finally make up as friends. Sam and Kirby, however, have a falling out in "She Cancelled..." when Kirby is frustrated to learn her suspicions were right about Sam's friend Ramy (Mustafa Elzein), an ex-convict, stealing from the hotel. In "You Make Being a Priest Sound Like Something Bad", Kirby learns that Cristal (Daniella Alonso) had an affair with a priest and blackmails her to assure Adam does not lose his job at the hospital. Sam apologizes to Kirby, and they rekindle their friendship. Kirby questions Michael's ongoing relationship with Vanessa (Jade Payton) after learning of her and Dominique's manipulations in "Robin Hood Rescues", but sticks by his side and assists in his revenge, sabotaging their dreams of stardom. In "My Hangover's Arrived", Kirby, Sam, Cristal, and Fallon retrace their steps after blacking out during Fallon's bachelorette party. Anders discovers a trail of violence in Adam's past after growing concerns of his and Kirby's newly discovered relationship. Anders brings his concerns to Kirby, including his beliefs that Adam is responsible for burning Alexis (Elaine Hendrix), but she does not believe him.

==== Season four ====
Kirby proves her loyalty to Adam in "That Unfortunate Dinner" when he confesses to both burning Alexis and poisoning his adoptive mother, but her life is put in jeopardy during Fallon and Liam's wedding in "Vows Are Still Sacred" when she is stabbed by a deranged Evan Tate (Ken Kirby). In "The Aftermath", Anders grants Kirby and Adam has blessing upon seeing how much Adam cares for Kirby, but the couple face further obstacles when Alexis determines Kirby to be a threat to her relationship with her son. After competing over Adam's birthday celebration in "The Birthday Party", Alexis brings Kirby's ex, Oliver Noble (Luke Cook), to Atlanta in hopes of sabotaging the couple. Oliver provides Kirby with a new career path into modeling, but he also reintroduces her to bad habits such as partying and drug abuse. In "A Public Forum for Her Lies", Adam breaks up with Kirby, and Anders kicks her out of the manor until she agrees changes her ways. Anders ends up in a fatal car accident in "Go Rescue Someone Else", and Kirby misses her father's funeral due to overdosing in a motel, abandoned by Oliver who alerts Alexis of her location before returning to Australia.

Kirby avoids processing her father's death and returns to modeling in "But I Don't Need Therapy", only to have a meltdown before walking the runway. She finally visits Anders' gravesite with Fallon before checking into rehab. Upon her return to the manor in "Stars Make You Smile", Kirby sets out to make amends with those she hurt during her relapse—namely Adam—who accepts her apology but is unable to remain her friend. While sorting through her father's belongings in "A Good Marriage in Every Sense", Kirby discovers a flash-drive amongst Anders' belongings that was meant to be viewed upon his death. The drive contains video messages from Anders to Kirby, providing a sense of closure as well as the details of his updated will and an explanation of insurance in the form of a book containing all of the Carrington family secrets. Kirby offers the book to Michael to leverage against Blake in political negotiations in "Affairs of State and Affairs of the Heart", but he is unable to go through with it and they agree to burn the book. However, Kirby secretly keeps a copy for herself.

==== Season five ====
In "Let's Start Over Again", Kirby supports Fallon after she survives a near-fatal gunshot wound and rallies the Carringtons by Fallon's bedside, who spends the majority of "That Holiday Spirit" in a coma. Kirby helps Amanda Carrington (Eliza Bennett) investigate a mysterious drone circulating Alexis' penthouse in "How Did the Board Meeting Go?", and she saves Dominique's fashion show by stepping in to walk the runway in "Go Catch Your Horse". Kirby attempts to rebuild her professional reputation with Amanda's assistance in "Devoting All of Her Energy to Hate". Kirby is rejected by her former agent, but the agent's colleague, Charlie Jiménez (Cynthia Quiles), takes an interest in Kirby and agrees to sign her as a client. In "A Real Actress Could Do It", Kirby books a shampoo commercial that Amanda helps her rehearse. Kirby develops feelings for Charlie, to Amanda's dismay, and after initially rejecting Kirby's advances, Charlie has a change of heart when impressed by Kirby's shoot. In "The Only Thing That Counts Is Winning", Kirby takes issue with Michael dating her colleague, Sasha Harris (Yvonna Pearson), who informs Michael that Charlie extorts her clients. Amanda catches wind of this in "A Friendly Kiss Between Friends" and tries to convince Kirby of Charlie's corruption. This backfires and Kirby sets off for a modeling shoot in Milan; however, she leaves only after kissing Amanda, who confesses romantic feelings for Kirby.

Kirby returns to Atlanta in "There's No Need to Panic", caught in the middle of Adam and Amanda's sibling rivalry. Kirby reveals that she and Charlie broke up in order to maintain their professional relationship, which paves the way for a secret romance with Amanda. This continues through "Vicious Vendetta", when Amanda publicly announces that she and Kirby are in a committed relationship at Alexis' wedding reception. Kirby and Michael help Sam put together an LGBT pride celebration at The Sahara Club in "Ben". Alexis gets ahold of Kirby's book of Carrington secrets in "My Family, My Blood", which results in Kirby testifying on Blake's behalf during his trial against his estranged brother Ben for the Carrington dynasty in "There's No One Around to Watch You Drown". Kirby's relationship with Amanda suffers in "First Kidnapping and Now Theft" when Kirby manipulates Amanda's position at the hospital to help Jeff. Tensions remain in "More Power to Her" when they start to discuss their ideals for the future, but the conversation is put on hold due to the sudden arrival of Amanda's ex, Judge Florence Whitley (Kate Beahan). In "Catch 22", Kirby encourages Amanda to accept her dream job in London. After six months apart, they reunite at Michael's wedding and Kirby decides to join Amanda in London.
