= Dynasty season 3 =

Dynasty season 3 may refer to:

- Dynasty (1981 TV series) season 3
- Dynasty (2017 TV series) season 3
