= Joseph Anders =

- Dynasty character
- Lee Bergere as Joseph Anders
- Portrayed by: Lee Bergere
- Duration: 1981–83
- First appearance: "Oil" (1981)
- Last appearance: "The Bungalow" (1983)
- Created by: Richard and Esther Shapiro
In-universe information
- Occupation: Majordomo
- Spouse: Alicia Rowan
- Children: Kirby Anders; Sean Rowan; Victoria

Joseph Anders is a fictional character from the ABC television series Dynasty, created by Richard and Esther Shapiro. Portrayed by Lee Bergere, the character is introduced in the series' 1981 pilot episode as the majordomo of Denver oil tycoon Blake Carrington (John Forsythe). Joseph is consistently caught up in the melodrama of the Carrington family, and his daughter, Kirby (Kathleen Beller), is introduced in 1982. Bergere was written out of the series at the beginning of the fourth season in 1983. Anders is portrayed by Alan Dale in The CW's 2017 reboot of the series from seasons one to four.

== Original series ==
Lee Bergere debuted as Joseph in the Dynasty pilot episode, "Oil" (1981), and was written out in the second episode of the fourth season, "The Bungalow" (1983). The role is one of Bergere's best-known.

=== Storylines ===
==== Season one ====
Denver oil tycoon Blake Carrington introduces his fiancée—and former secretary—Krystle to the household in "Oil". Longtime Carrington majordomo Joseph is staunchly loyal to Blake, and immediately dislikes Krystle, to whom he is dismissive until reproached by Blake's son, Steven. In "The Honeymoon", Krystle is having problems adjusting to life as a wealthy woman, made especially challenging by the imperious Joseph. Krystle rises to the challenge.

==== Season two ====
Joseph displays a deep loathing for Blake's first wife Alexis, who has returned to Denver after being exiled by Blake years before. Blake loses his sight in a car bombing; his vision returns in "The Hearing", but he hides his recovery from everyone except Joseph.

==== Season three ====
In "Mark", Joseph wants to quit his job at the mansion to help his daughter, Kirby, in France. She comes to Denver instead in "Kirby", and in "Acapulco" Joseph warns Kirby away from Jeff Colby, who is married to Blake's daughter Fallon. Joseph then warns Jeff away from Kirby in "The Locket". Jeff and Fallon divorce, and Jeff marries Kirby in Reno, Nevada in "Fathers and Sons". Joseph is angry to learn of the marriage in "The Downstairs Bride". Kirby is pregnant, and Alexis threatens Joseph that she will tell Kirby "the truth" about her mother in "The Threat". In the season three finale "The Cabin", Krystle and Alexis are trapped in a cabin, which someone sets on fire.

==== Season four ====
Krystle and Alexis survive. In "The Bungalow", someone tries to kill Alexis in the hospital, and Joseph kills himself by way of a self-inflicted gunshot. In "The Note", Blake and Jeff find a note in which Joseph confesses to setting the cabin fire to kill Alexis.

== Reboot ==
Joseph Anders
- Dynasty character
- Alan Dale as Joseph Anders
- Portrayed by: Alan Dale
- Duration: 2017–2021
- First appearance: "I Hardly Recognized You" (2017)
- Last appearance: "Filled with Manipulations and Deceptions" (2021)
- Created by: Sallie Patrick; Richard and Esther Shapiro
In-universe information
- Occupation: Majordomo
- Spouse: Unnamed ex-wife
- Children: Kirby Anders; Steven Carrington

=== Casting and development ===
Dale was cast in the pilot in March 2017. Executive producer Sallie Patrick said that with Anders and Carrington chauffeur Michael Culhane, "we introduce the theme of upstairs/downstairs, because how can you have a show about the filthy rich without including the people who try their damnedest to keep them clean?" Of Anders and Cristal Carrington's nephew Sam Jones, she said, "We've introduced their friendship, and I totally 'ship them together. Locking them in the basement [in "A Taste of Your Own Medicine"] was so much fun ... Sammy Jo is always getting in over his head, so it made sense for him to be the first one knocked out. And the funniest person to lock him in the basement with seemed to be Anders." Before the premiere of season two, Patrick previewed the introduction of Anders's daughter Kirby (Maddison Brown):

We will come to see how Anders is keeping [Kirby] at arm's length, because not only do they have a complicated and fraught relationship, but she has an equally fraught relationship with the Carringtons, and Anders being the loyal friend to the family as well as an employee...she jeopardizes many things for him. He loves his daughter, of course, but he also has never felt adequate parenting her, which was why she was living with her mother for some time in Australia.

Dale began playing the character, more commonly referred to as "Anders", in the 2017 pilot of the Dynasty reboot. Anders is killed off in the season four episode "Go Rescue Someone Else" (2021), but the character continues to appear throughout the rest of season four as a fantasy of other characters.

=== Storylines ===
==== Season one ====
Carrington majordomo Joseph Anders (Alan Dale) is protective of the family, and threatened by Cristal's presence as the new would-be mistress of the mansion. After the wedding in "I Hardly Recognized You", Anders warns Cristal (Nathalie Kelley) that he has investigated her sordid past and will reveal the details to Blake (Grant Show) if she steps out of line. In "Guilt is for Insecure People", Anders merges Cristal's meager assets with Blake's per the terms of their prenuptial agreement, effectively making her unable spend any money without Anders knowing. In "Company Slut", Anders manipulates Sam (Rafael de la Fuente) to keep Steven (James Mackay) away from his ex-boyfriend, Ted Dinard (Michael Patrick Lane), a recovering drug addict whom Blake and Anders had previously pushed out of Steven's life. In "The Best Things in Life", Anders discreetly helps Cristal pay off someone from her past, but goes to Blake when he catches her in a lie. Anders and Cristal discover that Cristal's sister Iris Machado (Elena Tovar) was behind the extortion plot in "Rotten Things". On Blake's behalf, Anders bribes a prison guard to stage an attack intended to prevent Cesil Colby (Hakeem Kae-Kazim) from being paroled in "Nothing but Trouble". After Sam reveals in "The Gospel According to Blake Carrington" that he is in the country illegally, Anders sets him up with an immigration lawyer to begin the citizenship process. In "A Line from the Past", Anders tells Sam that he has an ex-wife and a daughter, Kirby, in Australia. Anders moves to call her, but hangs up. Sam invites Kirby to his wedding to Steven in "Dead Scratch", before learning from Steven and Fallon (Elizabeth Gillies) that as a child she was a "psychopath" who tormented Fallon. Later, Anders is surprised to find Kirby arriving at the mansion.

==== Season two ====
Anders keeps Kirby (Maddison Brown) at a distance from the Carringtons in "Twenty-Three Skidoo", and father and daughter clash over her wild lifestyle and his mistrust. Kirby continues to stir up trouble in "The Butler Did It" when she unlocks a repressed childhood memory of Anders and Alexis (Nicollette Sheridan) discussing their one night stand, leading to the revelation that Anders is Steven's biological father. In "Snowflakes in Hell", Anders explains his side of the story to Steven before working to make amends with Blake. A psychic prophecy reveals that Anders will play a grand role in Sam's journey of growth in "Queen of Cups", and Sam helps Anders and Kirby repair their relationship in "That Witch", after which Anders invites Kirby to move into the manor. In "Crazy Lady", Anders questions Kirby's maturity in the midst of L.B.'s kidnapping, but realizes she's grown up upon her rescuing the missing child. After Blake kills Mack (Jeremy Davidson) in "Parisian Legend Has It..." for supposedly causing Cristal's miscarriage, Anders disposes of the body in the Carringtons' lake. In "Life is a Masquerade Party", after initially struggling to cope with Sam and Steven's divorce, he accepts that he also needs to move on from Steven, for now. After suffering from a heart attack in "Thicker Than Money", Anders begins to reconsider his allegiance to the Carringtons. In "Deception, Jealousy, and Lies", Anders decides to leave the manor to work for Sam at his new hotel, shortly before Mack's body is discovered in the Carringtons' lake.

==== Season three ====
Anders initially sticks around in "Guilt Trip to Alaska" to assist Blake regarding the bodies found in the Carringtons' lake, but he officially tenders his resignation to work for Sam after Blake kicks Kirby out of the manor. He helps Sam oversee the renovations of the hotel, officially opening in "Mother? I'm at La Mirage". Feeling confident in Sam's ability to run the hotel on his own in "Shoot from the Hip", Anders steps back and resumes his job at the manor. In "The Sensational Blake Carrington Trial", Anders concludes that Kirby is the DA's surprise witness, so he takes an immunity deal to testify, lying under oath and confessing to killing Mack himself. Anders calls to invite Kirby to move back into the manor, but she leaves town. In "What Sorrows Are You Drowning?", Anders struggles to get into contact with Kirby and reaches out to Fallon for assistance in rescuing her from a cult. When Blake decides to buy back Carrington Atlantic, Anders discovers in "Battle Lines" that Jeff (Sam Adegoke) and Alexis (Elaine Hendrix) have put in a bid for the company. In "She Cancelled...", Anders records Dominique (Michael Michele) and Vanessa (Jade Payton) discussing their manipulations of Michael (Robert Christopher Riley), giving the former chauffeur clarity on where his new relationship stands. In "Robin Hood Rescues", Sam, Adam (Sam Underwood), and Liam (Adam Huber) go on a rescue mission when Anders and Blake are captured by Moldavian government officials. Anders shares with Blake that his dream is to open a beachfront restaurant in New Zealand. Once they're rescued, Blake gifts Anders with a deed to open said restaurant whenever he wishes to retire. Anders learns that Kirby and Adam have started seeing each other in "My Hangover's Arrived", so he begins looking into Adam's past, discovering a trail of violence. Anders questions Alexis about the night she supposedly fell into the fireplace and later brings his concerns to Kirby. When she refuses to stop seeing him, Anders leaves on the private jet to Billings, Montana to investigate Adam further.

==== Season four ====
Anders' investigation of Adam leads him to Shelly Duncan (Michaela Cronan) in "That Unfortunate Dinner", a woman from Adam's past with similar concerns. Anders brings Shelly back to Atlanta in "Vows Are Still Sacred", hoping to stop Adam before he's able to hurt anyone else. Shortly before Fallon's wedding, Anders finds Kirby bleeding out from a stab wound with Adam applying pressure; he holds Adam at gunpoint, believing him to be responsible. In "The Aftermath", it's made clear that Kirby was stabbed by Fallon's deranged ex, not Adam, though Anders still doesn't want Adam anywhere near his daughter. Anders gets a recorded confession of Adam admitting to poisoning his adoptive mother, but he agrees to not go to the police. Anders continues to disapprove of Kirby and Adam's relationship in "The Birthday Party", but he goes against Alexis' methods of trying to tear them apart. Anders grows concerned when Kirby's ex, Oliver Noble (Luke Cook), arrives in Atlanta in "I Hate to Spoil Your Memories". He realizes it was Alexis' meddling that brought him to town, and he confronts her in "A Public Forum for Her Lies", demanding she drop Oliver. It is too late, and Kirby resumes her former lifestyle involving drug addiction. Anders tells Kirby to leave the manor until she wishes to make better choices. In "Go Rescue Someone Else", Anders helps Fallon rescue Liam from kidnappers, suffering an injury to his ribs in the process. He regrets kicking Kirby out of the manor, but is unable to tell her this himself. On his way to visit Cristal (Daniella Alonso) in the hospital, he loses control of his car and dies in a crash. Anders continues to appear to specific characters who can see and hear him.

=== Reception ===
Dale has received praise for the role, and Maureen Ryan of Variety called him "the best aspect of the new version of Dynasty", noting that "Dale improves every scene he's in." Patrick said, "Alan Dale is amazing as Anders. From the beginning, everybody wanted to be in a storyline with him."
