= Krystle Carrington =

Fictional character in the American television series "Dynasty"

- Dynasty character
- Linda Evans as Krystle Carrington
- Portrayed by: Linda Evans
- Duration: 1981–1989, 1991
- First appearance: "Oil" (1981)
- Last appearance: "The Wedding" (1989)
- Created by: Richard and Esther Shapiro
- Spin-off appearances: Dynasty: The Reunion (1991)
In-universe information
- Occupation: Secretary; Socialite
- Sisters: Iris Dean
- Spouse: Mark Jennings; Blake Carrington
- Children: Krystina Carrington
- Stepchildren: Adam Carrington; Fallon Carrington; Steven Carrington; Amanda Carrington
- Nieces: Sammy Jo Carrington
- First cousins: Virginia Metheny

Krystle Carrington (also Grant and Jennings) is a fictional character from the 1980s American TV series Dynasty, created by Richard and Esther Shapiro. Portrayed by Linda Evans, the character was introduced in the 1981 pilot episode. In the story, Krystle is the former secretary and new wife of oil tycoon Blake Carrington (John Forsythe), and initially has to adjust to his machinations and upper class lifestyle. The arrival of Joan Collins as Blake's glamorous ex-wife Alexis Carrington provided a foil for Krystle for the remainder of the series. Evans left Dynasty early in its ninth and final season, though she reprised her role for the 1991 miniseries continuation, Dynasty: The Reunion.

In the first season of the 2017 reboot of the series, the role of Krystle was reimagined as Cristal Flores Carrington, portrayed by Nathalie Kelley. It is later elaborated upon that Cristal's birth name is Celia Machado, and she is killed at the end of the season. Ana Brenda Contreras was cast as Cristal Jennings for season two. Cristal let Celia use her identity, and comes to Blake to pay her respects after Celia's death. In July 2019, it was announced that Contreras would not be returning for season three for personal reasons, and that Daniella Alonso would take over the role of Cristal. Alonso portrayed the role from 2019 to 2022.

== Original series ==
Evans originated the role of Krystle in the 1981 series pilot, remaining until the ninth and final season, in which she appeared in only six episodes out of the twenty-two episode season. Evans made her final appearance during the eighth episode of the season, "The Wedding", which aired on January 12, 1989, four months before the series was ultimately cancelled. She reprised the role for the 1991 miniseries continuation, Dynasty: The Reunion.

=== Characterization ===
The character of Krystle Carrington is depicted as the dutiful wife to Dynasty's anchor, millionaire patriarch Blake Carrington (John Forsythe). Blake's marriage to his former secretary Krystle is the central event of the serial's three-hour pilot episode, "Oil". Dynasty co-creator Esther Shapiro said of Krystle:

Krystle is a woman who wants her husband Blake more than anything else, for richer or for poorer. It pleases Krystle to [...] share the frustrations and challenges of Blake's life. She still greets each day with bright-eyed vitality and a zest for living. Her goodness and concern for others are stabilizing factors in the Carrington family, ones that have earned her the admiration and respect of all. Krystle Carrington is a tender, loving, woman—a passionate romantic living the life of every girl's dream, yet, bringing to it common sense, compassion and seal of approval. She is truly a beautiful human being.

Krystle is "sweet, loyal, and loving", the "good girl" in contrast to Blake's first wife, the villainous Alexis (Joan Collins). In Women and Soap Opera, Christine Geraghty described Krystle as the moral center of her family, "a constant reminder to the [male characters] of the need for integrity, humanity and domestic harmony." Esther Shapiro said that Krystle is family-oriented, and a person who "always believed in her heart". According to Shapiro, Krystle acts as the show's moral compass, "trying to bring decency to the strange and often sinister world of the rich, where the rules are often very different."

Evans described the similarities between herself and her character: "We both care for people; we both used to seek peace at any price, tried to work out things in the family and felt tremendous joy and happiness in having a relationship. And she (Krystle), like me, learned to stand up for herself at a late time in life ... But I stand up for myself a lot more than Krystle does."

Geraghty compared Krystle to her screen rival Alexis, highlighting the differences in characterization: "[Krystle] is clearly the counterpart to Alexis in moral stature and attitude. The contrast is presented vividly through appearance and style. When she and Alexis compete [...] the contrast could not be more marked. Alexis is artificial, with white make-up, red nails and lips, black curls, while Krystle is 'natural' with fair hair, blue eyes, free hair [...] Krystle is normally seen at home and she welcomes into it anyone who needs comfort and support. She accepts without resentment Blake's children and she is frequently called on to ameliorate his patriarchal harshness and his castigation of himself."

=== Storylines ===
==== Season one ====
As Dynasty begins in 1981, Krystle is set to marry oil tycoon Blake Carrington, but receives an icy reception from both Blake's daughter Fallon and the Carrington majordomo, Joseph, although she wins both of them over in time. She soon makes friends with Blake's sensitive son Steven, but her relationship with Blake is threatened by the advances of her married ex-lover Matthew Blaisdel and Blake's own volatile personality. Their marriage is strained by her discomfort as she learns about Blake's ruthless side, especially in business. Blake rapes Krystle when she is reluctant to have sex with him. Later, Blake is arrested and charged with murder. Krystle must testify whether Blake has ever shown a violent temper. In the season finale, a mysterious witness enters the courtroom. Visibly agitated, Blake turns to his lawyer and asks, "What's she doing here?"

==== Season two ====
The mystery witness is Blake's ex-wife, Alexis. She testifies to Blake's violent temper. He is found guilty, but given a suspended sentence. Krystle also learns that she is pregnant. Krystle loses her baby in a horse riding accident. Blake suggests that Krystle meet with his friend, psychiatrist Nick Toscanni. Krystle suspects that Alexis may have caused her accident. She confronts Alexis, and the women have a vicious fight. Krystle feels alienated from Blake with Alexis around, and Nick tries to seduce her. Blake accuses her of having an affair with Nick, but Krystle has been faithful. Blake goes to confront Nick but does not return. Worried, Krystle goes to find him.

==== Season three ====
Krystle finds Blake and gets him to safety. Later in the season, Krystle tries to help Blake and his long-lost son Adam form a father-son relationship. Krystle also learns that her divorce from her first husband Mark Jennings was never official when he comes back to Denver in the hope to have her back. Not long after Steven is missing and presumed dead, his ex-wife, Sammy Jo, (who is also Krystle's niece) appears with a baby named Daniel, that is hers and Steven's. Blake and Krystle offer to keep the child. When Steven returns to Denver, alive, Krystle is heart broken to give up little Danny but is thrilled Steven is alive and back home. In the third-season finale, Krystle meets Alexis at a remote cabin, where Alexis offers her one million dollars to leave Blake's life. Krystle refuses but then they discover they have been locked inside the cabin which is quickly engulfed by a fire.

==== Season four ====
Krystle and Alexis are rescued by Mark. A few months later, Blake and Krystle remarry. Krystle goes to work for Denver-Carrington in PR, much to the dismay of Tracy Kendall who was hoping to get the job herself. Tracy pretends to be Krystle's friend, but secretly decides to seduce Blake. Though told she could no longer have children after the riding accident two years earlier, Krystle is overjoyed to discover she is pregnant again.

==== Season five ====
Krystle has a baby girl, whom she names Krystina. Although Krystina is fragile at first, she survives and thrives. Krystle encounters a man from her past, Daniel Reece. He turns out to be Sammy Jo's father. Blake grows jealous of their friendship. Daniel is in love with Krystle, and they kiss. Meanwhile, Lady Ashley Mitchell attempts to seduce Blake. Someone has photos taken of both Blake with Ashley and Krystle with Daniel and has them sent to each other. However, both Blake and Krystle declare their love for each other. When Daniel is later killed, he bequeaths his entire fortune to Sammy Jo, but names Krystle as executor of the estate which makes Sammy Jo furious. When Blake's daughter Amanda falls in love with Prince Michael of Moldavia, the entire Carrington family go to Moldavia for the wedding. However, during a coup, Moldavian rebels storm the wedding chapel and shoot everybody in it.

==== Season six ====
Blake and his family survive the attack, although Steven's boyfriend Luke, and Lady Ashley Mitchell are killed, while King Galen is badly hurt. Upon returning to Denver, Krystle goes to visit Sammy Jo and is shocked to find her own double there. She is knocked on the head and held hostage by Joel Abrigore, while the look-alike, Rita, impersonates Krystle as part of a scheme Joel and Sammy Jo concocted to gain clear access to Sammy Jo's inheritance. As Rita infiltrates the Carrington mansion for several weeks (where not even Blake can tell that she is an imposter), Joel becomes obsessed with the captive Krystle. Eventually, Krystle and Rita have a confrontation in the attic where Krystle is being held. As Krystle tries to escape, she and Rita fight. In a change of heart, Sammy Jo knocks Rita out so that Krystle is freed. Rita and Joel then disappear and Krystle returns to the Carrington mansion just in time to save Blake whom Rita had slowly been poisoning. In the season finale, Krystle and Blake learn that Alexis now owns their mansion and throws Blake and Krystle out. Furious, Blake grabs Alexis by the throat and starts to strangle her.

==== Season seven ====
Krystle pulls Blake off of Alexis before he kills her. Blake learns that his hotel, La Mirage, has burned down. A grief-stricken widower blames Blake for the fire and forces Blake's car off the road. Krystle is severely injured, but recovers. Later, Blake and Krystle move back to the mansion when Blake thwarts Alexis' plans and throws her out. Blake, Alexis, and Ben are in southeast Asia visiting an oil rig when it explodes. Krystle arrives on the scene only to learn that Alexis has taken Blake out of the hospital as he suffers from amnesia and believes he is still married to Alexis. When Krystle finally finds them, Blake doesn't recognize her. Heartbroken, Krystle prepares to return to Denver alone. However, moments later Blake's memory returns and Krystle takes him back home, much to Alexis' chagrin. Blake and Krystle's daughter, Krystina, falls ills and needs a heart transplant. A donor is found, Krystina is fine, but the donor's mother kidnaps Krystina. However, she is found unharmed. In the season finale, after Adam's wedding, Krystle's presumed-dead former lover Matthew Blaisdel takes the Carrington family hostage at gunpoint, stating he has come back for Krystle.

==== Season eight ====
After several days in captivity, Steven stabs Matthew and the family is freed. Blake runs for governor against the incumbent and Alexis running as an independent. Krystle takes an active role in the campaign, including researching the sudden death of Alexis' second husband Cecil Colby. Although she doesn't have hard evidence, she has enough to cast doubt on whether Alexis murdered her husband. She threatens to leak her story to the press if Alexis doesn't stop spreading lies about Blake. Alexis complies. Despite their best efforts, Blake loses. Not long after, he returns home to find his bedroom trashed and Krystle missing. He cries out: "Oh, Krystle, I thought we had more time!"

==== Season nine ====
Krystle has a serious brain tumor and must have a risky surgery. They fly to Switzerland, where the surgery is successful but Krystle is left in a coma.

==== The Reunion ====
Three years later, Krystle has recovered from her coma, which is revealed to have been medically induced to allow an evil international consortium to brainwash her into killing Blake. A sympathetic nurse helps Krystle escape from the clinic and return to an overjoyed Blake. When her "programming" kicks in, she pulls a gun on Blake, but their love is too strong and the plan fails.

=== Reception ===
Evans won a Golden Globe Award for Best Actress in a Television Drama Series for the role in 1981, and was subsequently nominated every year from 1982 to 1985. She was nominated for a Primetime Emmy Award for Outstanding Lead Actress in a Drama Series in 1983. Evans won a People's Choice Award for Favorite Female Performer in a New TV Program in 1982, and for Favorite Female TV Performer in 1983, 1984, 1985, and 1986. She won a Soap Opera Digest Award for Outstanding Lead Actress in 1984 and 1985.

In the book Cultural Theory and Popular Culture, John Storey likened Krystle to the characters Deirdre Barlow from Coronation Street, Pamela Ewing from Dallas and Kathy Beale from EastEnders, as they are associated "not merely with moral values but also the capacity to speak out when necessary in defence of the truth."

== Reboot ==
Cristal Carrington
- Dynasty character
- Nathalie Kelley as Cristal Flores Carrington a.k.a. Celia Machado
- Portrayed by: Nathalie Kelley (2017–2018); Ana Brenda Contreras (2018–2019); Daniella Alonso (2019–2022)
- Duration: 2017–2022
- First appearance: "I Hardly Recognized You" (2017) [Cristal Flores/Celia Machado]; "Twenty-Three Skidoo" (2018) [Cristal Jennings]
- Last appearance: "Dead Scratch" (2018) [Cristal Flores/Celia Machado]; "Catch 22" (2022) [Cristal Jennings]
- Created by: Richard and Esther Shapiro
In-universe information
- Occupation: Public relations executive [Cristal Flores/Celia Machado]; COO of Carrington Atlantic [Cristal Flores/Celia Machado]; Physical therapist [Cristal Jennings]; Co-CEO of Flores Inc. and Primetime Private Air [Cristal Jennings]
- Father: Silvio Flores [Cristal Jennings]
- Brothers: Roberto Flores [Cristal Jennings]
- Sisters: Iris Machado [Cristal Flores/Celia Machado]
- Spouse: Blake Carrington; Mark Jennings [Cristal Jennings]
- Stepchildren: Adam Carrington; Steven Carrington; Fallon Carrington; Amanda Carrington
- Nephews: Sam Jones [Cristal Flores/Celia Machado]

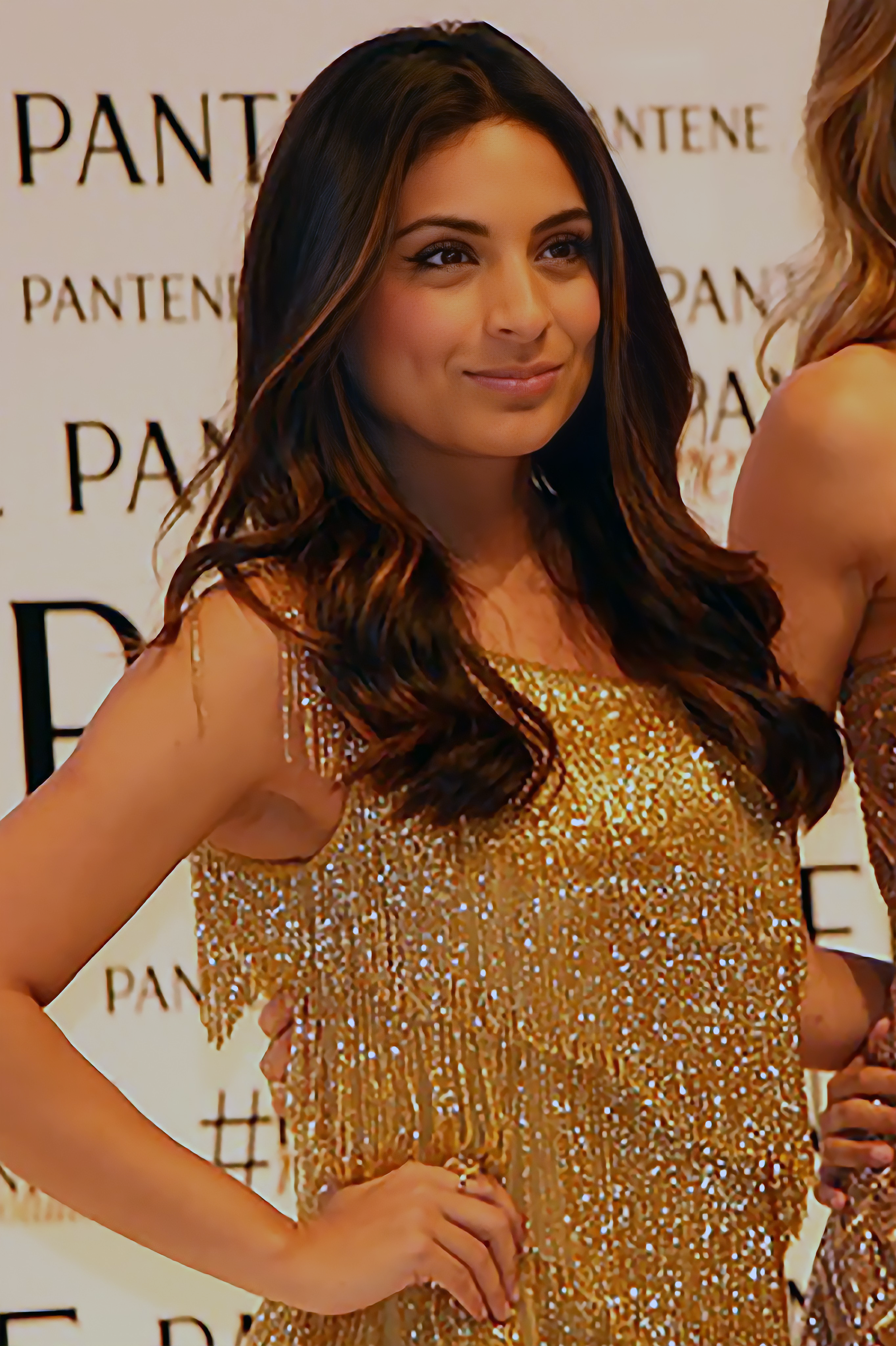
Ana Brenda Contreras portrays Cristal Jennings in season 2 of the reboot series.

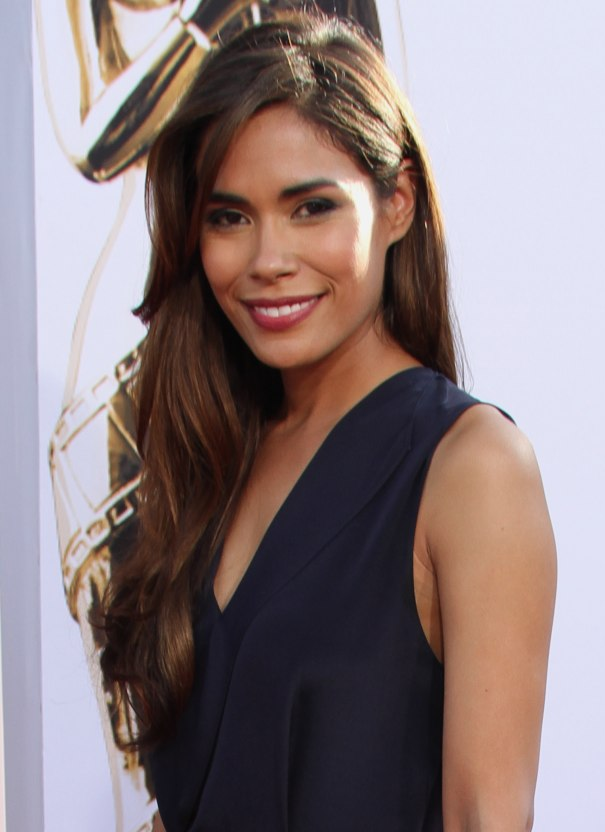
Daniella Alonso portrays Cristal Jennings beginning in seasons 3-5 of the reboot series.

=== Casting ===
A pilot for a Dynasty reboot for The CW was announced in September 2016, and Nathalie Kelley was cast as Cristal Flores, a Latina reimagining of Krystle, in January 2017. Kelley said that producers offered her the role after seeing her work in The CW series The Vampire Diaries, and she signed on before reading a script. The first season premiered on The CW on October 11, 2017.

In June 2018, Kelley told E! News that she was not asked to return for season two. She said in 2020 that she had been surprised to get the call that she would not be returning to the series, and explained:

I think I wasn't up to the challenge of a nighttime soap. I wasn't prepared for that genre. It wasn't something I had experience in. I didn't know too many actresses who can hold a candle to the wonderful Elizabeth Gillies (Fallon Carrington), who absolutely nails that tone and that genre ... I was challenged ... I didn't dig as deep as I could have. I felt limited and I felt stuck. At the same time, the writing was boxing me in a little bit. And I think the best thing they felt they could do is start afresh.

The CW announced in August 2018 that Ana Brenda Contreras had been cast as "the real Cristal Flores" for the second season. In July 2019, the network announced that Contreras would not be returning for season three for personal reasons, and that Daniella Alonso would take over the role of Cristal. In May 2020, showrunner Josh Reims confirmed that Alonso would be back for season four, saying "I kind of wanted to do this thing—which I still might do—where we pretend at the beginning of the season that we're getting another new Cristal. But I don't want to scare Daniella. She's so great in the role, and I'm so excited that she's coming back."

=== Characterization ===
Noting that Krystle, in the original series, "was pure and the moral center of the show", executive producer Josh Schwartz said of the reboot version of the character portrayed by Kelley, "With this new Cristal, we liked the idea of not letting her be quite as pure and raising some questions about her past and having her stir the pot—making her more formidable. That really let us lean into this rivalry between Fallon and Cristal." Showrunner Sallie Patrick said of Kelley's Cristal, "She's scrappy and she's a hustler and she's a fighter and a career woman, but it's not so black and white." Kelley said of the 1980s version of the character, "She's not really given much to do besides be beautiful and look after the house." Kelley also suggested to producers that Cristal should be "at least in her 30s. I don't think women around the world are going to be happy with this rich billionaire in his 50s dating someone who's under 30, and that threshold makes a big difference." Cristal and her nephew Sam share a mysterious past in Venezuela. Kelley said that Cristal's Venezuelan origins will allow the show to explore the current geopolitics of that country.

Patrick said of the Contreras character, Cristal Jennings:

She is modeled after Linda Evans's Krystle [from the original series]. While she has secrets, she is an inherently good person, and as things progress with her involvement with the family and her place on the canvas, we'll see how her inherent goodness really becomes a complication for the rest of the family, because she will become almost like a mob wife to Blake who is going down a dark spiral. It's very dangerous when you have a good person telling a terrifying person that they don't have to worry about their actions.

Reims promised a "seamless transition" as Alonso assumed the role. He said that the character would be written "a little more real and a little less scary, which is how we were writing Cristal last year."

=== Storylines ===
==== Season one ====
In the premiere episode "I Hardly Recognized You", Cristal (Nathalie Kelley) is engaged to her billionaire boss Blake Carrington (Grant Show), but is immediately disliked by his willful daughter Fallon (Elizabeth Gillies). Fallon plots to drive a wedge between them by giving her father photos of Cristal with her former lover Matthew Blaisdel (Nick Wechsler, but Fallon's plan backfires, pushing up the wedding and securing Cristal the promotion Fallon wanted for herself. Meanwhile, Anders (Alan Dale), the Carrington family butler, makes his dislike for Cristal (and his knowledge of her past) known, and the arrival of her shady nephew Sam (Rafael de la Fuente)—who has just slept with Fallon's brother, Steven (James Mackay)—puts her in further jeopardy. Matthew is killed, and his wife Claudia (Brianna Brown) accuses Blake of murder. In "Spit It Out", a devastated Cristal puts aside sentiment to prove her loyalty to Blake and help him protect her new family. In "Guilt is for Insecure People", Sam's mother—Cristal's sister Iris (Elena Tovar)—is in trouble, but Anders has made it impossible for Cristal to send her money. Cristal remembers her past as Celia Machado, when the sisters stole a fortune, but only Cristal escaped Venezuela. She is tempted by a diamond necklace worth millions, but Sam takes the initiative and secretly arranges the theft of Cristal's engagement ring and other valuables during a charity gala. While Cristal takes Blake on an impromptu honeymoon in "Private as a Circus", Fallon leaks a sex video of Cristal and Matthew from Matthew's phone. Cristal faces the backlash from her sex video in "Company Slut". She apologizes to an irate Claudia, who chases Cristal into the street and is accidentally hit by Blake with his car. Cristal insists that a pregnant Claudia stay at the mansion to convalesce in "I Exist Only for Me". Sam and Claudia bond, but her erratic behavior convinces Blake and Cristal that she should leave. Sam and Cristal learn that Claudia has been taking the wrong medication. In "A Taste of Your Own Medicine" it is revealed that Claudia has been faking her memory problems. She holds the Carringtons at gunpoint, wanting Cristal to watch her kill Blake, but the rest of the family is able to overpower her. Cristal's pursuers have found her in "The Best Things in Life", and Anders helps her pay them off. When Blake catches her in a lie, Cristal confesses her secrets to him. In "Rotten Things", Blake brings Iris to Atlanta for the holidays. Cristal and Anders discover that Iris was behind the extortion plot, and a confrontation with her sister causes Cristal to admit to Sam that she killed his father, Alejandro Raya (Luis Fernández (actor)), to defend Iris.

Cristal is a pariah at the mansion in "A Well-Dressed Tarantula". Sam's father Alejandro reveals himself to her, very much alive, and threatens to expose Blake's father's past crimes if she does not help Alejandro close a deal with Carrington Atlantic. Cristal, Blake, Fallon, and Sam work together to turn the tables on Alejandro and Iris. Alejandro and Iris kidnap Fallon and hold her for ransom in a warehouse in "I Answer to No Man". Concerned about Blake's plan, Cristal sneaks off to make the drop, but is taken as a hostage as well. Cristal helps Fallon escape, but is whisked away in a truck by Alejandro and Iris. Cristal convinces Iris that Alejandro is bad and will only turn on her, and as Alejandro tries to strangle Cristal, Iris shoots and kills him. The sisters reconcile. Cristal sends Iris off with some cash, and tells the police she shot Alejandro in self-defense, not Iris. In "Promises You Can't Keep", Cristal learns from a journalist friend, Rick Morales (J. R. Cacia), that Blake regularly bribed Senator Paul Daniels (Rick Hearst) when he was a judge. To avoid the truth coming out, she gives Rick an alternative story about Daniels' many extramarital affairs. Cristal receives flowers from Rick, and admits to Blake that they kissed, in "The Gospel According to Blake Carrington". Aware that Rick is secretly working with his nemesis Jeff Colby (Sam Adegoke), Blake presses Cristal to get as close to Rick as possible, but she refuses. In "Enter Alexis", Blake's newly-arrived ex-wife Alexis Carrington (Nicollette Sheridan) tells Fallon that Blake bribed a judge to seize custody and exile her, which Cristal confirms. Cristal puts the Carrington resources behind helping ex-Carrington chauffeur Michael Culhane's (Robert Christopher Riley) ailing father in "Don't Con a Con Artist". Learning that his illness is tied to an environmental scandal that Carrington Atlantic covered up, Cristal convinces Blake to go public with the truth in "Use or Be Used", but he later destroys her files on the coverup and uses a recording of her admitting guilt to keep her in line. While Fallon and Cristal work together to gain leverage over Blake in "A Line from the Past", he publicly announces Fallon's promotion to COO in place of Cristal. Blake wants to mend fences with Cristal in "Trashy Little Tramp", but she meets secretly with a divorce lawyer. He finds out, but she has only updated their prenuptial agreement to remove her potential settlement, as a means to prove her love. In "Dead Scratch", a resurrected Matthew helps Claudia escape the sanitarium, and they infiltrate the mansion during the preparations for Steven and Sam's wedding. Cristal catches Alexis kissing Hank (Brent Antonello) and the women fight, which ends with Alexis locking Cristal in the stable house. Claudia snaps and confronts Cristal with a gun. Matthew steps between them as Claudia fires, except that Matthew is a figment of her imagination, and Cristal takes the bullet. The building is set on fire, and Alexis runs upstairs through the flames to release Cristal.

==== Season two ====
In season two, Celia/Cristal has died, and in "Twenty-Three Skidoo" several women appear claiming to be the person from whom Celia stole her assumed identity. Sam is aware of enough details to know that they are all lying. In Sedona, Arizona, Cristal Jennings (Ana Brenda Contreras) watches online coverage of the Carringtons. In "Ship of Vipers", Cristal arrives at the mansion and shows Blake a photo of her with Celia. Cristal explains that she was once in a Mexican hospital, where she befriended Celia and encouraged her to emigrate to the United States using Cristal's identity. Blake pursues Cristal romantically in "The Butler Did It", but she is uncomfortable when she realizes that he sees her as a substitute for Celia, and goes back to Arizona. Cristal returns in "Snowflakes in Hell" to give Blake her support when he learns that Steven is not his biological son. Alexis tries to get rid of Cristal in "Queen of Cups", but she only helps Blake and Cristal get closer. Alexis sabotages their plans to leave town together for Thanksgiving in "That Witch", but this only leads to a proposal of marriage from Blake to Cristal. Cristal's attempts to rid herself of Alexis fail in "A Temporary Infestation", but Cristal makes sure everyone learns that Alexis is the one who left the baby at the manor. Blake buys a soccer team for Cristal in "A Real Instinct for the Jugular". In "A Champagne Mood", Cristal confides in Sam that she is pregnant. Blake discovers the pregnancy test and announces the news publicly. Cristal texts "M. Jennings" that her baby is Blake's and not his, but she is not actually sure. In "The Sight of You", Cristal confesses to Fallon that her ex-husband Mark Jennings (Damon Dayoub) may be the father of her baby. Fallon urges Cristal to tell Blake the truth, but she is unable to when he expresses how excited he is about being a father again.

Alexis blackmails Tony the gardener (Chase Anderson) into helping her get dirt on Cristal in "Filthy Games", and when Alexis learns that Cristal is unsure about the baby's paternity, she makes sure Blake finds out. Blake is upset, but forgives Cristal for not telling him. In "Even Worms Can Procreate", Alexis tries to convince Mark that the baby is his, and Blake tells Cristal that whatever the paternity test shows, he will raise the child as his own. Mark shows up at the manor to get the truth from Cristal, and Blake asks him to stay with the Carringtons until the test results come back. Alexis lies to Mark that Cristal is still in love with him, and he and Cristal have a tender moment. Blake sees them together, and offers to have Mark's ban from professional soccer lifted if Mark leaves town. Cristal learns that the baby is Blake's and taunts Alexis. A distraught Alexis plans to commit suicide, but sees Cristal and Mark riding, and fires at Cristal instead. Mark takes the bullet, and Cristal's frightened horse throws her off and drags her. In "Parisian Legend Has It...", Cristal has survived but has lost her baby, and may not be able to have more children. Blake believes his hired muscle, Mack (Jeremy Davidson, is behind the shooting. A distraught Blake kills Mack with Cristal's approval, and Anders disposes of the body. When Blake loses the site of his new stadium in "Motherly Overprotectiveness", Cristal and Michael outmaneuver Jeff for a replacement location. Cristal's brother Beto (Geovanni Gopradi) has secretly helped her, and now her powerful father expects her to visit. In "Miserably Ungrateful Men", Cristal resists Beto's demand that she hire one of her father's pet players for the Atlantix, but he refuses to leave Atlanta until she capitulates. Sam catches Beto kissing another man, and convinces him to forgive Cristal for betraying their family. Beto backs down, and gives Cristal a dossier that her father has collected about her and the Carringtons. Cristal promises Beto she will keep Blake from antagonizing their dangerous father Silvio (Tony Plana) in "Life is a Masquerade Party", but Blake has the power cut at the Flores-owned stadium in Mexico, costing Silvio millions. Cristal invites Silvio to Carrington Manor and brokers a peace between him and Blake, who go into the gambling business together. In "This Illness of Mine", Blake and Cristal succeed in getting gambling legalized in Atlanta, but Michael learns that they coerced politicians to secure the vote. Michael's evidence is not enough for the FBI to arrest Blake, so in "New Lady in Town" Michael alerts Cristal that the FBI is on to Blake's scheme. Blake incriminates himself on tape and is arrested. In "Thicker Than Money", Cristal objects to Blake's plan to blame her father for his crimes. She goes to the FBI, ostensibly to inform on Blake, but she is secretly executing his plan to exonerate himself and frame Michael. In "Deception, Jealousy, and Lies", Fallon learns that Blake and Cristal's separation is only a ruse, and realizes that they are framing Michael for Blake's crimes. Before Blake and Cristal are able to marry, two bodies are discovered in the lake.

=== Reception ===
In 2017, Tierney Bricker of E! Online dubbed Nathalie Kelley "this season's breakout star". Maureen Ryan of Variety wrote, "Kelley isn't given much to work with. There's not enough depth or textured drama in any of her scenes; everything about the character seems a bit wan and whiny. Nothing about this Cristal makes her seem like a worthy love interest for Blake or an intimidating adversary for the headstrong and disapproving Fallon, despite the attempts to give her a mysterious backstory."

== See also ==
- Carrington family tree
