= Dynasty (2017 TV series) season 2 =

Dynasty
- Season 2
- Promotional poster
- Starring: Elizabeth Gillies; Nicollette Sheridan; Ana Brenda Contreras; James Mackay; Rafael de la Fuente; Robert Christopher Riley; Sam Adegoke; Maddison Brown; Alan Dale; Grant Show; Sam Underwood
- No. of episodes: 22

Release
- Original network: The CW
- Original release: October 12, 2018 – May 24, 2019

Season chronology
- ← Previous; Season 1 Next → Season 3

The second season of Dynasty, an American television series based on the 1980s prime time soap opera of the same name, originally aired in the United States on The CW from October 12, 2018, through May 24, 2019. The season was produced by CBS Television Studios, with Sallie Patrick as showrunner and executive producer alongside executive producers Josh Schwartz and Stephanie Savage. Debuting on October 11, 2017, the series was renewed for a second season on April 2, 2018. Dynasty was renewed for a third season on January 31, 2019.

Season two stars Elizabeth Gillies as Fallon Carrington, Grant Show as her father Blake Carrington, and James Mackay as her brother Steven, with Robert Christopher Riley as Michael Culhane, Sam Adegoke as Jeff Colby, Rafael de la Fuente as Sam Jones, Alan Dale as Joseph Anders, and Nicollette Sheridan as Alexis Carrington. Series regulars added for the second season include Ana Brenda Contreras as Cristal Jennings, Maddison Brown as Kirby, and Sam Underwood as Adam Carrington, Blake and Alexis's eldest son. Notable recurring characters featured in season two include Monica Colby (Wakeema Hollis); Dominique Deveraux (Michael Michele); Claudia Blaisdel (Brianna Brown); Liam Ridley (Adam Huber); Ada Stone (Katherine LaNasa); Melissa Daniels (Kelly Rutherford); and Hank Sullivan (Brent Antonello).

== Cast and characters ==
=== Main ===
- Elizabeth Gillies as Fallon Carrington, an Atlanta energy executive and heiress who is the daughter of billionaire Blake Carrington and his first wife, Alexis
  - Marisa Hampton portrays a younger Fallon
- Nicollette Sheridan (later Gillies) as Alexis Carrington, (Note: Sheridan is credited as a regular through episode fifteen, when she departs the series. Gillies takes over the role as guest star, in the three episodes between the seventeenth and nineteenth episodes of the season.) Blake's ex-wife, mother of Adam, Steven, and Fallon
- Ana Brenda Contreras as Cristal Jennings, a friend of Blake's late wife, Cristal Flores
- James Mackay as Steven Carrington, (Note: Mackay is credited as a regular through episode four and in episode fourteen of the season, and returns as a special guest star in episode ten and as a guest star in episode twenty-two.) Fallon's gay environmentalist brother, raised as Blake's son but fathered by Anders
- Rafael de la Fuente as Samuel Josiah "Sammy Jo" Jones, nephew of Blake's late wife Celia, and Steven's husband
- Robert Christopher Riley as Michael Culhane, Fallon's fiancé, formerly the Carrington chauffeur
- Sam Adegoke as Jeff Colby, business rival to Blake, revealed to be his nephew
- Maddison Brown as Kirby Anders, Joseph's daughter
- Alan Dale as Joseph Anders, the Carrington majordomo
- Grant Show as Blake Carrington, recently widowed billionaire, father of Fallon and Adam by his first wife, Alexis
- Sam Underwood as Adam Carrington / Dr. Mike Harrison, (Note: Underwood is credited as a guest star in episode fourteen, and as a regular beginning in episode fifteen.) Blake's and Alexis's eldest son, who was kidnapped as an infant

=== Recurring ===
- Adam Huber as Liam Ridley, a writer who marries Fallon and whose real name is Jack Lowden
- Brent Antonello as Hank Sullivan, Alexis's former lover and co-conspirator in a plot to fleece Carrington Atlantic
- Wakeema Hollis as Monica Colby, Jeff's sister and Blake's niece
- Katherine LaNasa as Ada Stone, an antiquities dealer who blackmails Michael
- Brianna Brown as Claudia Blaisdel, the disturbed woman who killed Blake's wife Cristal/Celia
- Nicole Zyana as Allison, Fallon's assistant

=== Guests ===
- Kelly Rutherford as Melissa Daniels, wife of Senator Paul Daniels, and Steven's former lover
- C. Thomas Howell as Max Van Kirk, Liam's uncle
- Pawel Szajda as Nikolai Dimitrov, a Russian oligarch interested in buying Carrington Atlantic
- Shannon Lucio as Mora Van Kirk, Max's wife
- Sharon Lawrence as Laura Van Kirk, Liam's mother
- Brian Krause as George, Liam's stepfather
- Natalie Karp as Mrs. Gunnerson, the Carrington cook
- Robert Arbogast as Dr. Nick Toscanni
- Michael Masini as Keith Hayes, Ada's associate
- Harriet Sansom Harris as Adriana, a psychic
- Arnetia Walker as Louella Culhane, Michael's mother
- Elizabeth Youman as Evie Culhane, Michael's sister
- Yani Gellman as Manuel, a tattoo artist that Sam hires as a "manny" for baby Matthew / Little Blake
- Joanna Going as Mimi Rose Prescott, Alexis's socialite friend
- David Furr as Nico Russo, a Van Kirk employee who threatens to expose Michael's criminal activities
- Taylor Black as Ashley Cunningham, Liam's new girlfriend
- Maulik Pancholy as Kenneth Desai, a reporter doing a story on Fallon
- Nicole Steinwedell as Lady Monk, a self-help guru Sam finds online
- Bill Barrett and later Chase Anderson as Tony, the Carrington gardener
- Damon Dayoub as Mark Jennings, Cristal's ex-husband
- Mathilde Warnier as Juliette Carrington, the French daughter of Blake's disinherited brother Benjamin
- Geovanni Gopradi as Roberto "Beto" Flores, Cristal's brother, an enforcer for the Flores crime cartel
- Jeremy Davidson as Nathan "Mack" Macintosh, Blake's hired muscle
- Elizabeth Fendrick as Theresa Harrison, Mike / Adam's foster mother
- P. J. Byrne as Stuart, a publishing executive who crosses Fallon
- Chris Brochu as Dale, the ghost writer of Fallon's memoir
- Lamont Thompson as Dr. Glennon, the team doctor for the Atlantix
- Andrea Bordeaux as Gloria Collins, a popular feminist podcaster Fallon seeks to land for her new publishing company
- Tony Plana as Silvio Flores, Cristal's father
- Hakeem Kae-Kazim as Cesil Colby, Jeff and Monica's father
- Jessi Goei as Trixie Tate, a childhood friend of Fallon's who was killed at Carrington Manor
- Michael Michele as Dominique Deveraux, Jeff and Monica's mother, Blake's half-sister

Cast notes

== Episodes ==
Dynasty season 2 episodes
No. overall	No. in season	Title	Directed by	Written by	Original release date	U.S. viewers (millions)
23	1	"Twenty-Three Skidoo"	Matt Earl Beesley	Sallie Patrick & Christopher Fife	October 12, 2018	0.64
A month after the fire, Fallon and Michael have resumed their relationship, but she and Liam pretend to still be married to assure that Liam's uncle Max buys Carrington Atlantic. Cristal has died in the fire, and Blake returns after a month's absence mourning her. Steven has not told Sam about Melissa's pregnancy. Anders keeps his newly-arrived daughter Kirby hidden from the Carringtons. Hank, who is the prime suspect in Cristal's murder, blackmails Alexis, threatening to expose their plan. He also reveals that he started the fire. Blake exposes the truth about Melissa to Sam, who comes to accept the news of the pregnancy. Michael proposes to Fallon, who accepts before flying to New York with Liam to meet the Van Kirks. Blake berates Alexis for her shameless gold digging, and they fall into bed together. In Sedona, Arizona, Cristal Jennings watches online coverage of the Carringtons.
24	2	"Ship of Vipers"	Kenny Leon	Josh Reims & Jenna Richman	October 19, 2018	0.61
Fallon and Liam are in New York to close the deal with Max, who makes a pass at Fallon. Sam and Alexis suspect that Melissa is not really pregnant, but they are proven wrong. Monica reluctantly hires Kirby to help her open Club Colby. When a rival venue schedules a concert to sabotage Club Colby, Kirby sneaks in and releases some rats to shut them down. Fallon tussles with Kirby, who vows to take everything from Fallon. Cristal Jennings arrives at the mansion and shows Blake a photo of her with his deceased wife Cristal Flores. Fallon has Kirby arrested for assault. With the deal contingent on Fallon sleeping with Max, she hires an escort to impersonate her, but Max dies of a heart attack during the encounter.
25	3	"The Butler Did It"	Pascal Verschooris	David M. Israel & Paula Sabbaga	October 26, 2018	0.56
Cristal is uncomfortable when she realizes that Blake sees her as a substitute for his deceased wife. Ada Stone blackmails Michael with the escort's testimony against Fallon. Fallon meets Liam's imperious mother Laura, hoping to win her over, but Fallon eventually eviscerates Laura over her abusive treatment of Liam. Kirby attends court-ordered counseling sessions with Dr. Nick Toscanni, who is secretly working with Alexis to find out what Kirby remembers regarding her banishment from Carrington Manor. Kirby realizes that Alexis started the fire in Fallon's room to get rid of her, and learns that Alexis and Anders had a one-night affair that led to Alexis's pregnancy. Kirby reveals the affair publicly, and Anders confirms that Steven is his biological child, devastating the Carringtons. Now that she believes her baby is no longer a Carrington heir, Melissa admits that Steven is not the father.
26	4	"Snowflakes in Hell"	Mary Lou Belli	Francisca X. Hu & Audrey Villalobos Karr	November 2, 2018	0.55
In the aftermath of Kirby's reveal, Blake is furious with Anders, Fallon throws Alexis out of the mansion, and Steven and Sam plan to go to Paraguay to work with Steven's foundation. Ada forces Michael into a high-stakes poker game under an assumed name; Jeff is also there, but does not blow Michael's cover. Michael photographs the documents Ada needs, and manages to get Jeff out before the FBI raids the game. The Carringtons follow Steven to Paraguay to convince him to return. Blake and Anders reconcile, and Steven encourages Fallon to reconcile with Alexis. Cristal returns to the mansion to give Blake her support. Steven decides to return to Paraguay alone.
27	5	"Queen of Cups"	Jeff Byrd	Kevin A. Garnett & Jay Gibson	November 9, 2018	0.60
Jeff and Michael work together against Ada, but she outmaneuvers them. Cristal and Sam bring a psychic, Adriana, to the mansion. Hank tries to sell the Rembrandt that Alexis gave him as collateral, but she intervenes to keep him away from Blake. Alexis attempts to get rid of Cristal, but her efforts only bring Blake and Cristal closer together. Fallon suspects Michael of cheating on her, and almost has sex with Liam. Claudia berates Hank for his failure to get the money. Adriana tells Alexis that a powerful man will propose to her, but that he will expire.
28	6	"That Witch"	Tessa Blake	Josh Reims & Libby Wells	November 16, 2018	0.66
As a major storm heads toward Atlanta, Blake and Cristal grow closer, and a jealous Alexis sabotages their plans to leave town for Thanksgiving. Fallon attempts to make amends with Michael's mother, while Liam serves her an ultimatum regarding their relationship. A tornado warning derails the Carrington Thanksgiving celebration. Fallon is knocked unconscious, and has a Wizard of Oz fantasy. She makes up with Alexis and chooses Michael over Liam. Blake proposes to Cristal. Hank cuts Claudia out of his payoff from Alexis, with whom he leaves baby Matthew.
29	7	"A Temporary Infestation"	Michael A. Allowitz	Jenna Richman	November 30, 2018	0.63
Alexis leaves Matthew to be found by Sam, who names him Little Blake. Sam and Kirby work together to find a nanny. Fallon and Monica's new business venture threatens Jeff and Michael's poker game, which does not please Ada. Cristal's attempts to rid herself of Alexis fail, but she learns that Alexis is the one who left the baby, and makes sure Sam finds out on his own.
30	8	"A Real Instinct for the Jugular"	Matt Earl Beesley	David M. Israel & Francisca X. Hu	December 7, 2018	0.56
Confronted about Little Blake, Alexis tells Sam that the baby is Hank's child, and Sam agrees to keep the secret. Fallon seeks Alexis's help with her wedding plans, and Alexis hits her socialite friend Mimi with her car to free up Fallon's chosen venue. However, Fallon decides to get married at Carrington Manor. Michael agrees to do one last job smuggling artifacts for Ada, and talks his way out of a dangerous situation. She gives him all of her blackmail material on Fallon and a $5 million bonus, but asks him to keep working with her. Missing Steven, Sam is tempted when Little Blake's new "manny", Manuel, comes on to him. Blake buys a soccer team for Cristal. Sam sees a pregnant Claudia in his wedding photos, and Alexis makes the connection that she is Little Blake's mother. Sam learns that Claudia has escaped the institution, and wonders if she killed his aunt Cristal and set the fire. Claudia rages over her missing child, and Little Blake disappears from the nursery.
31	9	"Crazy Lady"	Melanie Mayron	Christopher Fife & Paula Sabbaga	December 21, 2018	0.63
In the Fall finale, The FBI are called in to investigate the disappearance of Little Blake, who the Carringtons now know was fathered by Matthew. Claudia hides out in a hotel with baby Matthew, but a televised plea by Blake and Alexis leads the authorities to her. A hysterical Claudia has Matthew on the roof, and Blake, Fallon, Cristal, and Sam try to coax her away from the edge. Claudia admits to killing Blake's late wife Cristal, but trips and accidentally tosses the baby off the building. It is only a doll, and Kirby discovers that Manuel actually kidnapped the baby. She manages to knock him out with a lamp before Anders arrives. Before Claudia is arrested, Alexis gaslights her into believing Hank was not real. Michael and Jeff are caught up in Ada's plan to destroy Van Kirk Industries; Jeff is shot as they flee the FBI, and Michael crashes their car on the way to the hospital. At the Manor, Anders receives a call that Steven never got on the plane in Paraguay, and is missing.
32	10	"A Champagne Mood"	Michael A. Allowitz	Josh Reims & Kevin A. Garnett	January 18, 2019	0.59
Jeff recuperates at Carrington Manor in a hospital-like room set up by Blake. Michael confesses almost everything to Fallon, who forgives him. The family hears from Paraguay that Steven has reappeared, however Sam is served with divorce papers. Fallon and Michael go to a reluctant Liam for his help in accessing Van Kirk files, which they hope will incriminate Max in the drug smuggling and keep Michael out of jail. The records are clean, but they create a paper trail that Fallon uses to coerce Nico Russo to not name Michael in his testimony. Cristal confides in Sam that she is pregnant. Blake discovers the pregnancy test and announces the news publicly, to Alexis's dismay. Jeff tells Fallon that Michael continued to work with Ada even after she gave him her blackmail material, and a devastated Fallon breaks off the engagement. She goes to see Liam, only to discover that he has moved on with another woman. Fallon is furious to find Sam kissing another man. Steven calls Sam, and tells him that he does not want a divorce after all. Cristal texts "M. Jennings" that her baby is Blake's and not his, but she is not actually sure.
33	11	"The Sight of You"	Matt Earl Beesley	David M. Israel & Aubrey Villalobos Karr	January 25, 2019	0.58
Fallon takes a girls' trip with Monica, Cristal, and stowaway Kirby, but her true motive is to see Liam, who is at the same ski resort with his new girlfriend Ashley. Sam arrives and helps the women sabotage Ashley, while Fallon asks Liam for another chance. He is happy with Ashley, and asks Fallon to move on as well. Ashley and her friends confront Fallon and her posse at a dive bar, and the rival groups brawl. A furious Liam tells Fallon he never wants to see her again. Jeff invites his mother to Atlanta for a reunion. Monica, still furious over their mother's abandonment, calls Dominique and attempts to thwart her plans to come to Atlanta. Jeff is disappointed when she does not arrive, or even call. Blake asks Michael to help him secure a famous soccer player for his new team. Michael is able to do it, but his price is a stake in the team. Cristal confesses to Fallon that her ex-husband Mark Jennings may be the father of her baby. Fallon urges Cristal to tell Blake the truth, but she is unable to when he expresses how excited he is about being a father again.
34	12	"Filthy Games"	Geary McLeod	Francisca X. Hu & Libby Wells	February 1, 2019	0.60
Recovering from Liam's rejection, Fallon pulls out all the stops to convince a reporter that she is thriving. Alexis blackmails Tony the gardener into helping her get dirt on Cristal, and when Alexis learns that Cristal is unsure about the baby's paternity, she makes sure Blake finds out. Blake is upset, but forgives Cristal for not telling him. Sam engages a guru, Lady Monk, in hopes of becoming a better person, but Kirby exposes her as a con artist. Michael pressures Blake for more input regarding their soccer team, and makes it clear to both Blake and Fallon that he is no longer at their beck and call. Michael is surprised to find that Blake has hired Fallon to help with the team. Alexis calls Mark.
35	13	"Even Worms Can Procreate"	Viet Nguyen	Christopher Fife & Jay Gibson	February 8, 2019	0.61
While Alexis tries to convince Mark that the baby is his, Blake tells Cristal that whatever the paternity test shows, he will raise the child as his own. Mark shows up at the Manor to get the truth from Cristal, and Blake asks him to stay with the Carringtons until the test results come back. Fallon sabotages Michael in hopes that Blake will fire him from the Atlantix, but Blake fires her instead when her machinations at the team opening leave Michael publicly humiliated when his past painkiller addiction is exposed. Alexis lies to Mark that Cristal is still in love with him, and he and Cristal have a tender moment. Blake sees them together, and offers to have Mark's ban from professional soccer lifted if Mark leaves town. Fallon apologizes to Michael, and they sleep together. Cristal learns that the baby is Blake's and taunts Alexis. Sam gets a call from Steven, who has been mugged in an undisclosed location. A distraught Alexis plans to commit suicide, but sees Cristal and Mark horseback riding, and fires at Cristal instead. Mark takes the bullet, and Cristal's frightened horse throws her off and drags her.
36	14	"Parisian Legend Has It..."	Pascal Verschooris	Sallie Patrick & Jenna Richman	March 15, 2019	0.47
Cristal survives, but has lost her baby and may not be able to have more children. Fallon and Sam fly to Paris to see Steven. Alexis comforts Cristal at Blake's urging. Blake believes his hired muscle, Mack, is behind the shooting, and Alexis lies to further implicate him and elude suspicion. A distraught Blake kills Mack with Cristal's approval, and Anders disposes of the body. Steven wants a concerned Fallon and Sam to meet his friend, George, who has been staying with him in Paris. Their suspicions that Steven is having a drug-induced breakdown seem confirmed when it becomes clear that Steven is imagining George and needs help. Fallon and Sam check him into an institution, and head back to Atlanta. George appears, and tells a sedated Steven that he has been gaslighting and manipulating him. George is the real Adam Carrington, bent on claiming what is his in Atlanta.
37	15	"Motherly Overprotectiveness"	Brandi Bradburn	David M. Israel & Paula Sabbaga	March 22, 2019	0.55
Six months earlier in Billings, Montana, Mike Harrison's mother Theresa confesses that he is the kidnapped Adam Carrington. In the present, Adam introduces himself at the Manor with a silver rattle that Blake recognizes. Fallon is dubious, Blake immediately believes the newcomer is Adam, and Alexis clings to her story that Hank is their son. When Blake loses the site of his new stadium, Cristal and Michael outmaneuver Jeff for a replacement location. Cristal's brother Beto has secretly helped her, and now her powerful father expects her to visit. Fallon offers Mike $50 million to go away; he refuses, and takes a DNA test with Blake. Fallon and Sam go to Billings and learn that Mike lost his medical license for stealing narcotics. The DNA proves that Mike is Adam, and Fallon reveals Adam's secret to Blake. Adam explains that he stole the drugs for his ailing mother, but does not tell the others that he euthanized Theresa. Adam confronts Alexis with proof that she orchestrated Hank's arrival and fake DNA test; she explains that she was desperate, and apologizes. Adam offers to keep the secret, but then pushes Alexis's face into her lit fireplace.
38	16	"Miserably Ungrateful Men"	Jeff Byrd	Garrett Oakley & Bryce Schramm	March 29, 2019	0.52
Alexis is in the hospital with severe facial burns, and under Adam's thumb. Fallon is ostracized after a damaging article is released, and she seeks to repair her reputation by writing a memoir. Cristal resists Beto's demand that she hire one of her father's pet players for the Atlantix, but he refuses to leave Atlanta until she capitulates. Blake has Adam's medical license reinstated and hires him to work under the Atlantix's team doctor, whom Adam sabotages to secure the head doctor position for himself. Jeff visits Alexis and wants her to convalesce in his home, but Adam forces her to stay put. As Alexis is wheeled in for facial reconstructive surgery, Adam hands the doctor a reference photo that raises her eyebrows. Sam catches Beto kissing another man, and convinces him to forgive Cristal for betraying their family. Beto backs down, and gives Cristal a dossier that her father has collected about her and the Carringtons. After overhearing that her publisher is using her to get to Blake, Fallon buys the publishing company and fires him. One of the company's authors arrives to see Fallon, who is surprised to learn that it is Liam.
39	17	"How Two-Faced Can You Get"	Joanna Kerns	Christopher Fife & Kevin A. Garnett	April 19, 2019	0.55
Liam's arrival surprises Fallon, who does not want to publish Liam's novel. Rather than pay him off, she tries to manipulate him to pull out of the deal on his own. Learning that the league will be drug testing an Atlantix player who is using drugs, Blake and Adam conspire to switch the urine sample. Jeff tries to expose them with a video of Adam making the swap, but the commissioner is in Blake's pocket, and dismisses the allegations. Convinced by Jeff that Blake has been lying to him, Michael enlists Jeff to help him take down Blake in what Michael believes is a money laundering scheme. Kirby tries to resist her attraction to Michael out of respect for Fallon, but kisses him before she can come clean to Fallon about it. Monica sends a picture of the kiss to Fallon, who confronts Kirby. However, Fallon is understanding rather than angry. Fallon reads and loves Liam's novel, which is about their relationship. She goes to him to apologize, and offers to publish it after all. Adam relinquishes his office to Jeff, but secretly pours a chemical into Jeff's new paint. Alexis's new face is revealed.
40	18	"Life is a Masquerade Party"	Jeff Byrd	Josh Reims & Aubrey Villalobos Karr	April 26, 2019	0.49
Cristal promises Beto she will keep Blake from antagonizing their dangerous father Silvio, but Blake has the power cut at the Flores-owned stadium in Mexico, costing Silvio millions. Cristal invites Silvio to Carrington Manor and brokers a peace between him and Blake, who go into the gambling business together. Fallon arranges for Liam and his ex, Ashley, to spend time together in public to promote his book, but is jealous when they appear to be rekindling their relationship. Jeff and Michael argue and then make up as they struggle to find evidence that can take down Blake. With his divorce from Steven finalized, Sam throws a masquerade party to debut his single self. Fallon and Liam admit they are in love with each other. Adam presents Alexis to the family, who are shocked that her surgery has made her look almost exactly like Fallon. Adam takes a photo of Fallon and Liam kissing, which he sells to the press.
41	19	"This Illness of Mine"	Matt Earl Beesley	Francisca X. Hu & Jay Gibson	May 3, 2019	0.39
The negative publicity surrounding the photo threatens Liam's book sales, forcing Fallon to confirm publicly that the book is about her and not Ashley. Liam's mother Laura appears and threatens to block the novel's publication unless Fallon breaks things off with Liam. He tries to broker a peace over dinner. Laura claims to be dying of cancer, but Fallon is suspicious. Jeff is behaving erratically thanks to Adam's toxic paint, and collapses in his office. Blake and Cristal succeed in getting gambling legalized in Atlanta, but Michael learns that they coerced politicians to secure the vote. Alexis discovers that Adam is responsible for her doctors making her look like Fallon. She confronts Adam about it, and warns Fallon not to cross him. Alexis informs Fallon that she is leaving for Europe to get more plastic surgery. Fallon has Laura's blood tested and proves she is lying, but Laura deflects the accusation and Liam is angry with Fallon. Sam and Anders learn that Adam leaked the photo, has been sleeping with Laura, and helped plan and execute her ruse. Laura is eventually forced to confess, and Liam softens to Fallon. Fallon plots revenge against Adam.
42	20	"New Lady in Town"	Elodie Keene	David M. Israel	May 10, 2019	0.42
Jeff and Monica's mother, Dominique, reappears as Jeff recovers at home. She and Monica clash over Dominique's abandonment, and though Dominique is apologetic, she asserts that Jeff and Monica were better off being raised by their grandmother. Dominique confesses that she has been lying about having a successful career, and Jeff writes his mother a check for $1 million as a trap to see if she only came back for money. Jeff and Monica catch Dominique trying to leave, but she has thrown the check in the trash. Fallon and Liam plot to expose Adam's true colors to Blake, but Adam outmaneuvers them each time. Fallon finally goads Adam into assaulting her, and though Blake fires him publicly, he fully intends for Adam to keep working for him. Dominique takes a secret phone call, revealing that she has been manipulating Jeff and Monica, and that she has other children in New York. Michael's evidence is not enough for the FBI to arrest Blake, so Michael alerts Cristal that the FBI is on to Blake's scheme. Blake incriminates himself in a private conversation with Senator Joanne Braden, unaware that thanks to Michael she is wearing a wire. The FBI arrest Blake.
43	21	"Thicker Than Money"	Ken Fink	Jenna Richman & Kevin A. Garnett	May 17, 2019	0.47
While Fallon steps in for Blake to prevent Jeff and Michael from seizing control of the Atlantix, Liam and Kirby help her snatch a book deal from a competitor. Dominique visits Blake, who has been paying her for years to keep secret the fact that she is his half-sister. The payments have recently stopped, and Dominique wants what she is owed. Blake says she can have her money when she gets Jeff off his back. Sam receives a generous divorce settlement from Steven, and buys a luxury hotel on a whim. Jeff figures out that Adam poisoned him, and enlists Dominique to help destroy Blake and Adam. Cristal objects to Blake's plan to blame her father for his crimes. She goes to the FBI, ostensibly to inform on Blake, but she is secretly executing his plan to exonerate himself and frame Michael. Liam and Fallon finally have sex, while Kirby and Michael do the same. Anders collapses.
44	22	"Deception, Jealousy, and Lies"	Michael A. Allowitz	Christopher Fife & Paula Sabbaga	May 24, 2019	0.53
Fallon announces her intention to divest herself of the Atlantix and let Blake fend for himself, but he offers to join forces with her as full partners. Anders is anxious to get back to work after his heart attack, but ultimately joins Sam at the hotel instead. Jeff manipulates Adam into a fight in front of witnesses. He and Dominique stage a crime scene with Jeff's blood and Adam's cufflink to make it look like Adam murdered Jeff, who leaves the country. Dominique, however, removes the cufflink and calls Blake to confirm that his payments to her will resume now that Jeff is out of the way. Fallon learns that Blake and Cristal's separation is only a ruse, and realizes that they are framing Michael for Blake's crimes. She warns Michael, but Blake is one step ahead and Michael is arrested. Adam arranges for divers to find the body of Trixie Tate, a childhood friend of Fallon's who died accidentally at the Manor and whose body was placed in the lake by Anders. However, they also find a second body. Liam, hit over the head by Adam, falls face down into the pool.

== Production ==
=== Development ===
Dynasty was renewed for a 22-episode second season on April 2, 2018. A May 2018 press release teased that the show would introduce Blake's half-sister Dominique Deveraux, Jeff and Monica's mother, in season two. In March 2019, the role was cast with Michael Michele. In December 2018, AlloCiné reported that Dynasty would film an episode in Paris and its suburbs in January 2019 during Paris Fashion Week. Dynasty was renewed for a third season on January 31, 2019. In May 2019, Deadline Hollywood reported that co-executive producer Josh Reims would succeed Sallie Patrick as executive producer and showrunner for season three.

=== Casting ===
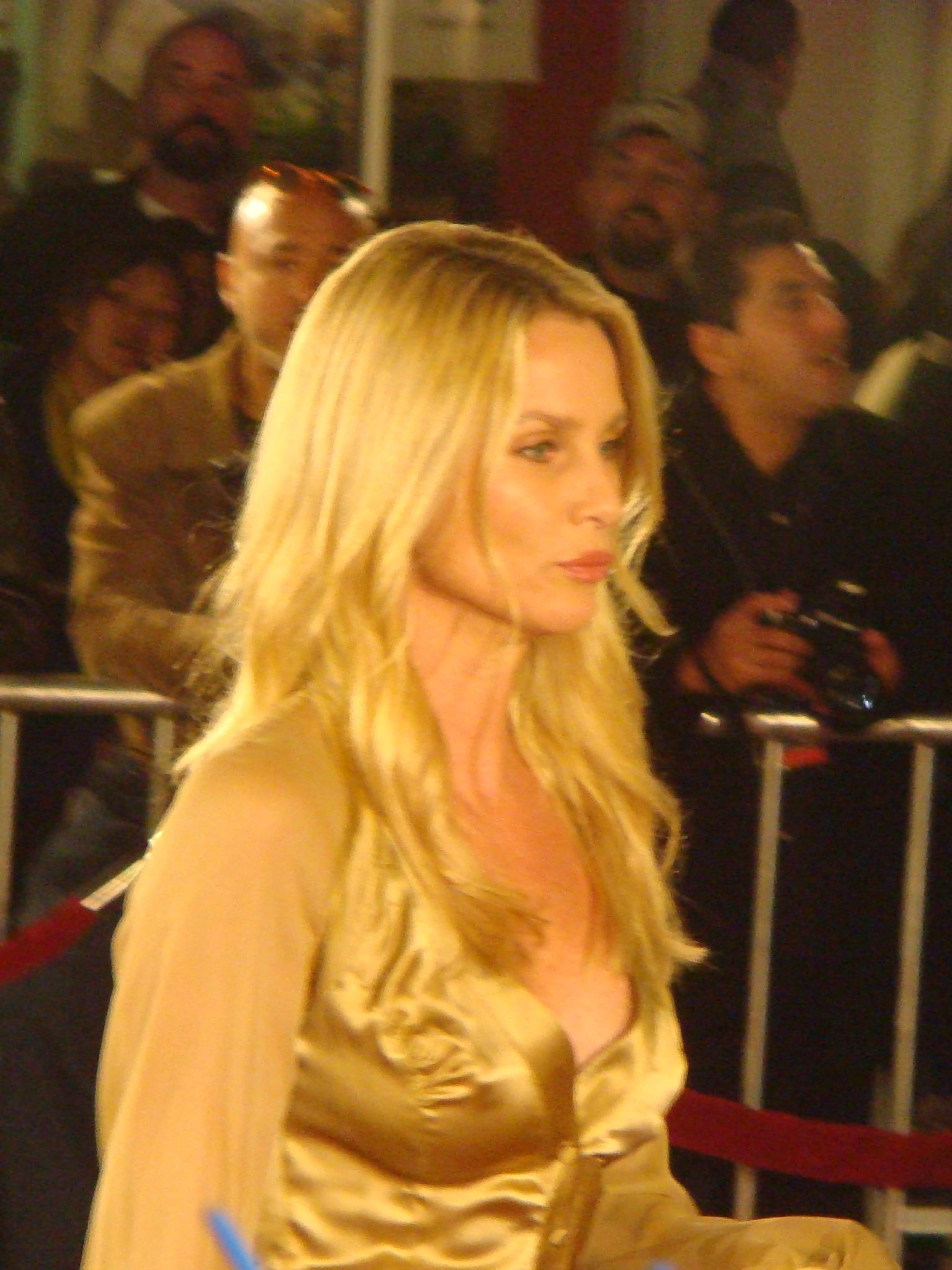
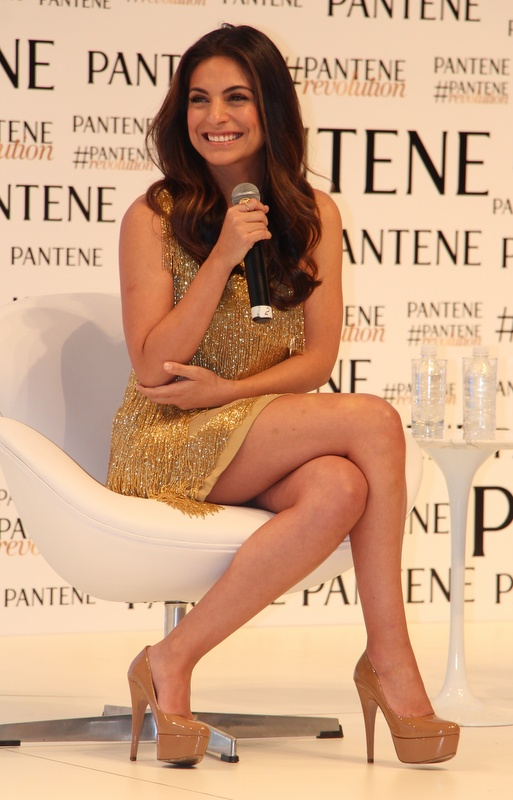
Nicollette Sheridan (left) and Ana Brenda Contreras (right) as Alexis Carrington and Cristal Jennings in season two.

In May 2018, TVLine reported that Nicollette Sheridan would be a series regular for the second season. In June 2018, original cast member Nathalie Kelley, who portrayed Celia Machado a.k.a. Cristal Flores Carrington, told E! News that she would not be returning for season two. The CW announced in August 2018 that Ana Brenda Contreras had been cast as "the real Cristal Flores" for the second season. Maddison Brown was also cast as Anders's daughter, Kirby, and Sharon Lawrence portrayed the guest role of Liam's mother, Laura Van Kirk. Grant Show's wife Katherine LaNasa joined the cast in October 2018 in the recurring role of Ada Stone.

In November 2018, The CW confirmed that James Mackay would no longer be a series regular after the first four episodes of season two, but would return later in the season. The CW announced on February 25, 2019, that Sheridan would be leaving Dynasty to focus on "some personal family responsibilities." Sheridan said in her own statement that she was leaving to spend more time with her terminally ill mother in Los Angeles. She last appeared in the episode "Motherly Overprotectiveness". Elizabeth Gillies, who was already playing Fallon on the show, took over the role after Sheridan's departure near the end of the second season. Her three-episode portrayal was a temporary recast to give producers time to find a suitable replacement for Sheridan. In March 2019, Sam Underwood began appearing as Blake and Alexis's kidnapped eldest child, Adam. The same month, it was announced that Michael Michele had been cast as Blake's half-sister Dominique. Michele first appeared in "New Lady in Town".

== Broadcast ==
Season two of Dynasty premiered on October 12, 2018, and the season finale aired on May 24, 2019. The season became available on Netflix in the US on June 1, 2019.

== Reception ==
On May 15, 2019, Dynasty ranked #5 on the list of most-watched series on Netflix in the UK, and #8 on the overall list of shows and films. The series ranked #6 the following week.

=== Ratings ===
Viewership and ratings per episode of Dynasty
No.	Title	Air date	Rating/share (18–49)	Viewers (millions)	DVR (18–49)	DVR viewers (millions)	Total (18–49)	Total viewers (millions)
1	"Twenty-Three Skidoo"	October 12, 2018	0.2/1	0.64	0.1	0.32	0.3	0.97
2	"Ship of Vipers"	October 19, 2018	0.2/1	0.61	0.1	0.27	0.3	0.88
3	"The Butler Did It"	October 26, 2018	0.2/1	0.56	0.1	0.32	0.3	0.88
4	"Snowflakes in Hell"	November 2, 2018	0.1/1	0.55	0.1	0.35	0.2	0.90
5	"Queen of Cups"	November 9, 2018	0.2/1	0.60	0.0	0.27	0.2	0.87
6	"That Witch"	November 16, 2018	0.2/1	0.66	0.1	0.24	0.3	0.90
7	"A Temporary Infestation"	November 30, 2018	0.2/1	0.63	0.1	0.26	0.3	0.89
8	"A Real Instinct for the Jugular"	December 7, 2018	0.2/1	0.56	—N/a	0.25	—N/a	0.81
9	"Crazy Lady"	December 21, 2018	0.1/1	0.63	0.1	0.25	0.2	0.88
10	"A Champagne Mood"	January 18, 2019	0.2/1	0.59	—N/a	—N/a	—N/a	—N/a
11	"The Sight of You"	January 25, 2019	0.1/1	0.58	—N/a	—N/a	—N/a	—N/a
12	"Filthy Games"	February 1, 2019	0.2/1	0.60	0.0	0.21	0.2	0.81
13	"Even Worms Can Procreate"	February 8, 2019	0.2/1	0.61	0.0	0.22	0.2	0.83
14	"Parisian Legend Has It..."	March 15, 2019	0.1/1	0.47	0.1	0.21	0.2	0.68
15	"Motherly Overprotectiveness"	March 22, 2019	0.1/1	0.55	0.0	0.16	0.2	0.71
16	"Miserably Ungrateful Men"	March 29, 2019	0.1/1	0.52	0.0	0.20	0.2	0.72
17	"How Two-Faced Can You Get"	April 19, 2019	0.2/1	0.55	0.0	0.19	0.2	0.74
18	"Life is a Masquerade Party"	April 26, 2019	0.1/1	0.49	0.1	0.19	0.2	0.68
19	"This Illness of Mine"	May 3, 2019	0.1/1	0.39	—N/a	0.21	—N/a	0.60
20	"New Lady in Town"	May 10, 2019	0.1/1	0.42	0.1	0.21	0.2	0.63
21	"Thicker Than Money"	May 17, 2019	0.1/1	0.47	0.1	0.19	0.2	0.66
22	"Deception, Jealousy, and Lies"	May 24, 2019	0.1/1	0.53	0.1	0.18	0.2	0.71

=== Critical response ===
In a review of the first nine episodes, Hidden Remote critic Georgia Makitalo gave the second season a letter grade of a B, noting that it's "more for the bigger story that I believe the writers are setting up for viewers," and that the grade could drop to a D if the storylines do not improve soon. Praise was given to the stunning and campy scenes that "make the show worth watching," such as The Great Gatsby inspired party and the Wizard of Oz dream sequence. Criticism was geared toward the lack of direction since selling Carrington Atlantic, noting that "Fallon needs something to do," as well as the Colbys' lack of screentime.

Makitalo was also disappointed in Alexis's development in the second season, stating:

Elizabeth Gillies is the clear star of the reboot, although it appears that the producers believe it is Nicollette Sheridan. While the former Desperate Housewives star brings a lot of gravitas and camp to the CW show, the writers have failed her as well. Alexis clearly has a back story that they have failed to uncover. Thus, Alexis is hardly sympathetic, and they are wasting Sheridan's exceptional talents.
