= Lee Bergere =

American actor (1918–2007)

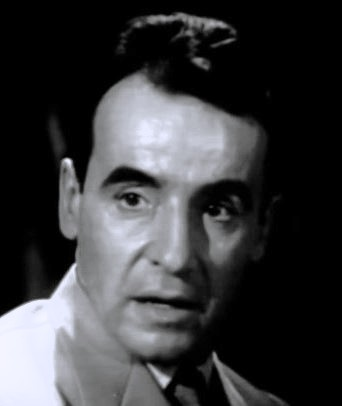
- Bergere in the TV series One Step Beyond (1960)
- Born: Solomon Bergelson; April 10, 1918; New York City, U.S.
- Died: January 31, 2007 (aged 88); Fremont, New Hampshire, U.S.
- Occupation: Actor
- Years active: 1936–1989
- Spouses: Janet Douglas (m. 1945, divorced) Harriet Stone Coleman (m. 1950; died 1995)
- Children: 1

Lee Bergere (born Solomon Bergelson; April 10, 1918 – January 31, 2007) was an American actor, known for his role as Joseph Anders in the 1980s television series Dynasty.

== Stage ==
Born in Brooklyn, New York, Bergere began his career in 1936 at age 18 as Danny Kaye's understudy in the Broadway production of Lady in the Dark. He appeared as the Duke, with Richard Kiley reprising his role as Don Quixote, when the Broadway hit Man of La Mancha premiered in Los Angeles in 1967. Through the years, Bergere also played Quixote as well as other characters in the show in Los Angeles, San Francisco, and New York. His Broadway credits also include Happiness Is Just a Little Thing Called a Rolls Royce, and Right Next to Broadway.

== Television ==
Bergere debuted on television on an episode of the live series Studio One with James Dean. He made three guest appearances on Perry Mason, two in 1963. In "The Case of the Witless Witness" he portrayed James Wall, a Congressional committee examiner. Later that year he played Dr. Charles Nevin, brother-in-law of convicted murderer Janice Barton, in the episode, "The Case of the Deadly Verdict." He also made one appearance as French psychiatrist Francois Chalon in The Addams Family. In 1964 he played Ramon in the Munsters TV show. In 1965 he portrayed Dr. George Devlin in "The Case of the Murderous Mermaid."

Bergere played Abraham Lincoln, in the Star Trek episode "The Savage Curtain". Other parts included comedic guest-star roles on Kentucky Jones, Get Smart, My Favorite Martian, The Munsters, All in the Family, WKRP in Cincinnati (in a pig costume) and a starring role on the short-lived series Hot l Baltimore, on which he played one of TV's first gay regular characters. During the first season of Mission: Impossible, Bergere played the character of a Swiss banker in the episode entitled "The Legacy." Bergere played German Count Von Sichel on Hogan's Heroes in the 1966 episode "The Prince From the Phone Company."

Bergere was known for his haughty and superior characters, a typecasting that culminated in his selection as the majordomo Joseph Anders on the prime-time soap opera Dynasty. With that role, and his on-screen billing in the show's opening credits starting in season two, Bergere achieved a level of fame rarely matched by other character actors who, like him, had worked in relative anonymity as guest stars on television series in the 1960s and 1970s including Hogan's Heroes. He appeared regularly only during the first three seasons of Dynasty (returning briefly in the fourth to be "killed off"), but his role grew beyond opening doors and announcing guests to encompass storylines that included the introduction of a daughter and his own character's suicide after setting a cliffhanger fire.

His last role was a recurring part on three episodes of Falcon Crest, another popular 1980s nighttime soap.

== Military service ==
A veteran of World War II, Bergere supervised entertainment services for soldiers stationed in North Africa.

== Death ==
Bergere died, aged 88, from undisclosed causes in Colonial Poplin Nursing and Rehabilitation Facility in Fremont, New Hampshire, where he had taken up residence some years earlier, having left the acting profession in 1989.

== Filmography ==
Year	Title	Role	Notes
1961	The Real McCoys	Fernando	Episode: "The Matador"
1962	The Dick Van Dyke Show	Mr. Mason	Episode: "One Angry Man"
1964	The Munsters	Ramon	Episode: "Herman's Rival"
1965	The Addams Family	Dr. François Chalon	Episode: "The Winning of Morticia Addams"
1967	The Wild Wild West	Col. Wayne Gibson	Episode: "The Night of the Colonel's Ghost"
1968	In Enemy Country	Miral	
1969	Bob & Carol & Ted & Alice	Emilio	
1969	Star Trek	Abraham Lincoln	S3:E22, "The Savage Curtain"
1971	Hogan's Heroes	Major Wolfgang Karp	Episode: "Kommandant Gertrude"
1972	The Doris Day Show	Jeff O'Neal / Prince Rupert	2 episodes
1973	Emergency!	Milton Zack	Episode: "Alley Cat"
1973	Incident at Vichy	Police Captain	TV movie
1973	The Six Million Dollar Man: Wine, Women and War	Masaha	TV movie
1973	The Wide World of Mystery	Luigi	Episode: "Prowler in the Heart"
1974	Maude	Peter Durland	Episode: "Lovers in Common"
1974	Owen Marshall, Counselor at Law	Juan Carlos Conforti	Episode: "I Promised You a Father (Part II)"
1975	Hot l Baltimore	Gordon	13 episodes
1976	All In The Family	Dean Winslow	Episode: "Mike's Move"
1976	Sandburg's Lincoln	Billy Herndon	TV miniseries, Episode: "Crossing Fox River"
1978	The New Adventures of Wonder Woman	Marius	Episode: "Death in Disguise"
1978	The Tony Randall Show	Clifford	Episode: Kid's Rights
1978	Evening in Byzantium	Monsiuer Carroll	TV Miniseries (2 parts)
1978	Soap	Anatole Martins	2 episodes (#2.6 & #2.8)
1979	WKRP in Cincinnati	WPIG Mascot	Episode: "Fish Story"
1981	The Love Boat	Vince Van Durling	Episode: "Two Grapes on the Vine/Aunt Sylvia/Deductible Divorce"
1981-1983	Dynasty	Joseph Anders	58 episodes
1983	Scarecrow and Mrs. King	Zinvoviev	Episode: "Saved By the Bells"
1985	North and South	Nicholas Fabray	6 episodes
1986	Dream West	'Papa Joe' Nicollet	2 episodes
1987	Murder, She Wrote	Maxim Soury	Episode: "A Fashionable Way to Die"
1989	Falcon Crest	Justin Nash	3 episodes
1989	Time Trackers	Dr. Karl Zandor	(final film role)
1991	The New WKRP in Cincinnati	Pig	Episode:"How Did We Get Here?" (final TV role)
