= Majordomo =

Head servant

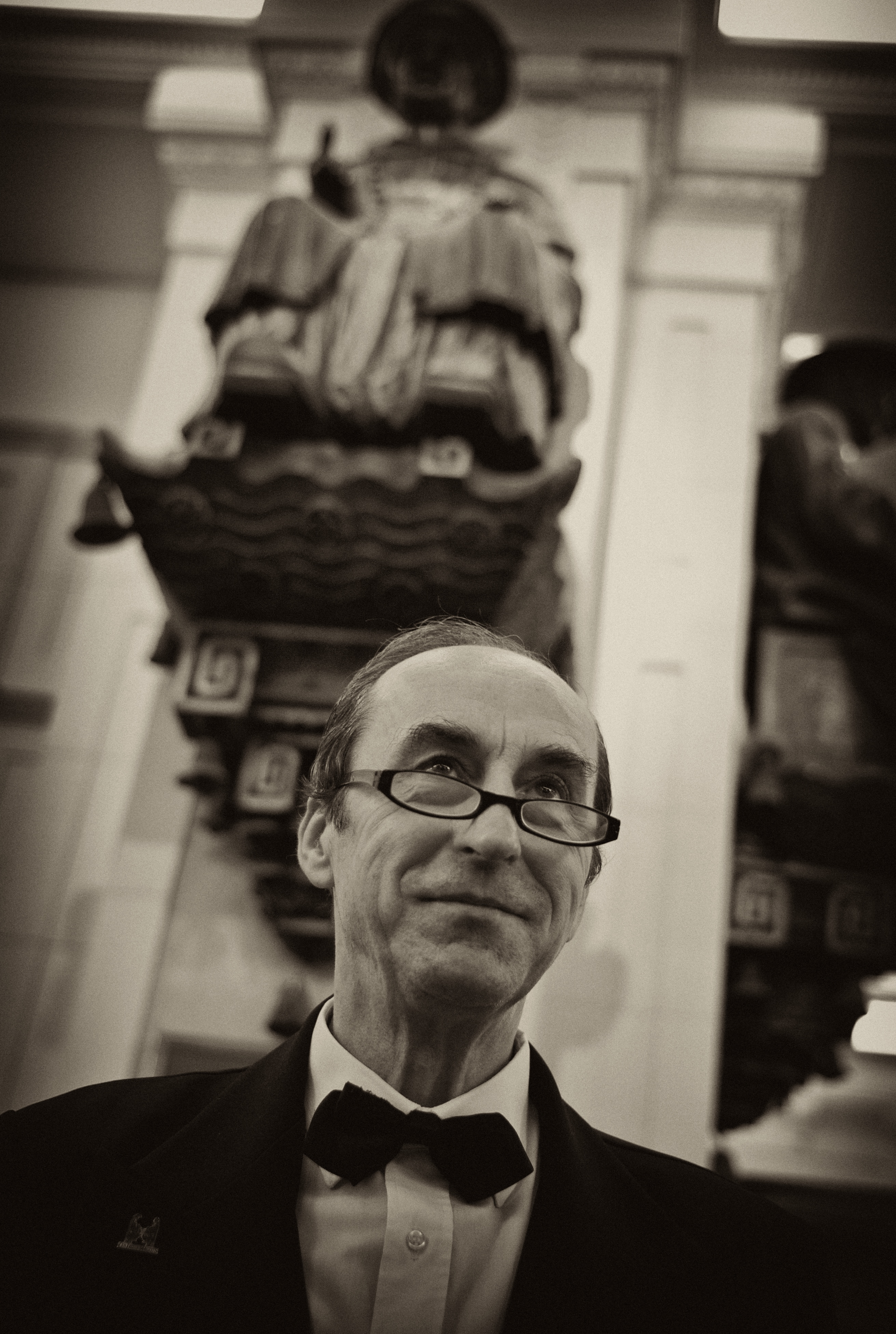
A majordomo at hotel des Deux Magots, Paris in 25 November 2009

A majordomo (US: /ˌmeɪdʒərˈdoʊmoʊ/) is a person who speaks, makes arrangements, or takes charge for another. Typically, this is the highest (major) person of a household (domūs or domicile) staff, a head servant who acts on behalf of the owner of a large or significant residence.

A majordomo may also, more informally, be someone who oversees the day-to-day responsibilities of a business enterprise. Historically, many institutions and governments—monasteries, cathedrals, and cities—as well as noble and royal houses, also had the post of majordomo, who usually was in charge of finances.

In Spanish and Portuguese, the related terms, respectively, mayordomo and mordomo mean butler. The Hispanos of New Mexico use mayordomo to refer to the manager of an acequia system for a town or valley.

== Etymology ==
The word majordomo is derived from maior domūs (Latin for 'principal of the house'), and it was borrowed into English from Spanish mayordomo or Old Italian maiordomo. It is also found as the French majordome, modern Italian maggiordomo, Portuguese and Galician mordomo, and Romanian and Catalan majordom.

== See also ==
- Castellan
- Chief operating officer
- Chief of staff
- Concierge
- Consigliere
- Chamberlain
- Executive officer
- Kouropalates (curopalate)
- Maître d'hôtel
- Mayor of the palace
- Papal majordomo
- Mayordomo mayor of the King of Spain
- Mayordomo mayor of the King of Castile
- Seneschal
- Steward
- Underboss
- Valet
