= List of Designated Survivor episodes =

Designated Survivor is an American political drama television series created by David Guggenheim, starring Kiefer Sutherland, airing on ABC. The series revolves around former Secretary of Housing and Urban Development Tom Kirkman (Sutherland), who is sworn in as President of the United States after a bombing kills his predecessor and everyone else in the line of succession during the State of the Union Address. The series premiered on September 21, 2016, and was renewed for a second season, which premiered on September 27, 2017.

During the course of the series, 53 episodes of Designated Survivor aired over three seasons. In May 2018, ABC canceled the series after two seasons. On September 5, 2018, Netflix picked up the series for a third season of 10 episodes, that premiered on June 7, 2019. On July 24, 2019, Netflix canceled the series.

== Series overview ==
Season	Episodes	Originally released		
Season	Episodes	First released	Last released	Network
1	21	September 21, 2016	May 17, 2017	ABC
2	22	September 27, 2017	May 16, 2018	ABC
3	10	June 7, 2019		Netflix

== Episodes ==
=== Season 1 (2016–17) ===
No. overall	No. in season	Title	Directed by	Written by	Original release date	US viewers (millions)
1	1	"Pilot"	Paul McGuigan	David Guggenheim	September 21, 2016	10.04
2	2	"The First Day"	Brad Turner	Story by : Jon Harmon Feldman; Teleplay by : David Guggenheim	September 28, 2016	7.97
3	3	"The Confession"	Sergio Mimica-Gezzan	Jennifer Johnson & Paul Redford	October 5, 2016	7.05
4	4	"The Enemy"	Paul Edwards	Dana Ledoux Miller & Jon Harmon Feldman	October 12, 2016	7.00
5	5	"The Mission"	Paul Edwards	Sang Kyu Kim & Michael Russell Gunn	October 26, 2016	5.96
6	6	"The Interrogation"	Michael Katleman	Barbie Kligman & Jenna Richman	November 9, 2016	5.56
7	7	"The Traitor"	Frederick E. O. Toye	Jennifer Johnson & Michael Russell Gunn	November 16, 2016	5.52
8	8	"The Results"	Chris Grismer	Paul Redford & Sang Kyu Kim	November 30, 2016	5.45
9	9	"The Blueprint"	Richard J. Lewis	Dana Ledoux Miller & Michael Russell Gunn	December 7, 2016	5.18
10	10	"The Oath"	Frederick E. O. Toye	David Guggenheim	December 14, 2016	6.18
11	11	"Warriors"	Stephen Surjik	Paul Redford & Carol Flint	March 8, 2017	5.86
12	12	"The End of the Beginning"	Mike Listo	David Guggenheim	March 15, 2017	5.74
13	13	"Backfire"	Tara Nicole Weyr	Sang Kyu Kim & Pierluigi Cothran	March 22, 2017	5.21
14	14	"Commander-in-Chief"	Frederick E. O. Toye	Michael Russel Gunn	March 29, 2017	5.15
15	15	"One Hundred Days"	Kenneth Fink	Dana Ledoux Miller	April 5, 2017	5.19
16	16	"Party Lines"	Mike Listo	Jenna Richman	April 12, 2017	4.82
17	17	"The Ninth Seat"	Frederick E. O. Toye	Paul Redford	April 19, 2017	5.06
18	18	"Lazarus"	Chris Grismer	Jennifer Johnson	April 26, 2017	5.11
19	19	"Misalliance"	Norberto Barba	Dana Ledoux Miller & Jenna Richman	May 3, 2017	4.62
20	20	"Bombshell"	Sharat Raju	Sang Kyu Kim	May 10, 2017	4.92
21	21	"Brace for Impact"	Frederick E. O. Toye	David Guggenheim	May 17, 2017	5.07

=== Season 2 (2017–18) ===
No. overall	No. in season	Title	Directed by	Written by	Original release date	US viewers (millions)
22	1	"One Year In"	Chris Grismer	Keith Eisner	September 27, 2017	5.50
23	2	"Sting of the Tail"	Frederick E. O. Toye	Keith Eisner	October 4, 2017	4.80
24	3	"Outbreak"	Chris Grismer	Ashley Gable	October 11, 2017	4.61
25	4	"Equilibrium"	Joe Lazarov	Paul Redford & Keith Eisner	October 18, 2017	4.34
26	5	"Suckers"	Fred Gerber	Bill Chais	October 25, 2017	3.94
27	6	"Two Ships"	Leslie Libman	Jessica Grasl	November 1, 2017	3.92
28	7	"Family Ties"	Milan Cheylov	Pierluigi Cothran	November 15, 2017	4.05
29	8	"Home"	Ian Toynton	Pat Cunnane	November 29, 2017	4.03
30	9	"Three-Letter Day"	Jeannot Szwarc	Bill Chais & Ashley Arena	December 6, 2017	3.87
31	10	"Line of Fire"	Chris Grismer	Keith Eisner	December 13, 2017	4.38
32	11	"Grief"	Timothy Busfield	Keith Eisner	February 28, 2018	3.72
33	12	"The Final Frontier"	Sharat Raju	Jeff Melvoin	March 7, 2018	3.60
34	13	"Original Sin"	Bosede Williams	Ashley Gable	March 14, 2018	3.69
35	14	"In the Dark"	Carol Banker	Bill Chais	March 21, 2018	3.98
36	15	"Summit"	Chris Grismer	Jessica Grasl	March 28, 2018	3.80
37	16	"Fallout"	Joe Lazarov	Tom Garrigus	April 4, 2018	3.84
38	17	"Overkill"	Jeff T. Thomas	Jeff Melvoin & Tracey Rice	April 11, 2018	3.29
39	18	"Kirkman Agonistes"	Leslie Libman	Pierluigi D. Cothran & Patrick Cunnane	April 18, 2018	3.51
40	19	"Capacity"	David Warry-Smith	Keith Eisner	April 25, 2018	3.36
41	20	"Bad Reception"	Chris Grismer	Tom Garrigus & Jessica Grasl	May 2, 2018	3.47
42	21	"Target"	Timothy Busfield	Bill Chais & Ashley Gable	May 9, 2018	3.29
43	22	"Run"	Chris Grismer	Keith Eisner	May 16, 2018	3.54

=== Season 3 (2019) ===
No. overall	No. in season	Title	Directed by	Written by	Original release date
44	1	"#thesystemisbroken"	Chris Grismer	Adam Stein	June 7, 2019
45	2	"#slipperyslope"	Peter Leto	Dawn DeNoon	June 7, 2019
46	3	"#privacyplease"	Timothy Busfield	Peter Noah	June 7, 2019
47	4	"#makehistory"	Chris Grismer	Ricardo Pérez González	June 7, 2019
48	5	"#nothingpersonal"	Peter Leto	Kendra Chanae Chapman	June 7, 2019
49	6	"#whocares"	Chris Grismer	Drew Westcott	June 7, 2019
50	7	"#identity/crisis"	Sudz Sutherland	Adam Stein	June 7, 2019
51	8	"#scaredshitless"	Sudz Sutherland	Kendra Chanae Chapman & Ricardo Pérez González	June 7, 2019
52	9	"#undecided"	Peter Leto	Dawn DeNoon	June 7, 2019
53	10	"#truthorconsequences"	Chris Grismer	Peter Noah	June 7, 2019

== Ratings ==
Designated Survivor : U.S. viewers per episode (millions)
Audience measurement performed by Nielsen Media Research
