= Designated Survivor season 1 =

Designated Survivor
- Season 1
- DVD cover
- Starring: Kiefer Sutherland; Natascha McElhone; Adan Canto; Italia Ricci; LaMonica Garrett; Tanner Buchanan; Kal Penn; Maggie Q
- No. of episodes: 21

Release
- Original network: ABC
- Original release: September 21, 2016 – May 17, 2017

Season chronology
- Next → Season 2

The first season of the American political drama series Designated Survivor began airing on September 21, 2016, on ABC. The series was ordered straight to series by ABC in December 2015, with a formal announcement of 13 episodes in May 2016. Eight days after the premiere, on September 29, 2016, ABC gave the series a full season order. The series is produced by ABC Studios and The Mark Gordon Company, and is filmed in Toronto, Ontario, Canada.

The series was renewed for a second season on May 11, 2017.

== Premise ==
On the night of the State of the Union, an explosion claims the lives of the President and everyone in the line of succession except for Secretary of Housing and Urban Development Thomas Kirkman, who had been named the designated survivor. Kirkman is immediately sworn in as president, unaware that the attack is just the beginning of what is to come.

== Cast and characters ==
=== Main ===
- Kiefer Sutherland as President Thomas "Tom" Kirkman
- Natascha McElhone as First Lady Alexandra "Alex" Kirkman
- Adan Canto as White House Chief of Staff Aaron Shore
- Italia Ricci as Special Advisor Emily Rhodes
- LaMonica Garrett as Secret Service Agent Mike Ritter
- Tanner Buchanan as Leo Kirkman (episodes 1–13; recurring episodes 14–21)
- Kal Penn as White House Press Secretary Seth Wright
- Maggie Q as FBI Agent Hannah Wells

=== Recurring ===
- Mckenna Grace as Penny Kirkman, Tom's daughter and Leo's younger sister.
- Peter Outerbridge as Charles Langdon, the former Chief of Staff and one of the survivors of the Capitol bombing who provides Wells with information about the conspiracy.
- Malik Yoba as Jason Atwood, the Deputy Director of the FBI who initially spars with Wells over her investigation into the bombing but quickly becomes one of her most trusted allies.
- Kevin McNally as General Harris Cochrane, the Chairman of the Joint Chiefs of Staff who refuses to accept Tom as the new Commander in Chief and attempts to take matters into his own hands.
- Virginia Madsen as Congresswoman Kimble Hookstraten, a Republican from Missouri and the designated survivor for the Republican Party who supports Tom's authority while secretly harboring her own agenda.
- Ashley Zukerman as Congressman Peter MacLeish, a third-term representative from Oregon who becomes a national hero following the bombing but struggles to hide a dark secret.
- George Tchortov as Nestor Lozano, a former CIA agent and wanted mercenary operating under the name "Catalan" who is heavily involved in the conspiracy.
- Reed Diamond as John Foerstel, the current Assistant Director of the FBI's Office of Professional Responsibility and the acting Attorney General who occasionally assists Wells in her investigation.
- Michael Gaston as James Royce, the Governor of Michigan who openly defies the Kirkman administration and tries to establish his own supreme authority.
- Mariana Klaveno as Brooke Mathison, a clandestine operator in league with the people behind the Capitol bombing.
- Jake Epstein as Chuck Russink, an FBI analyst who occasionally assists Wells in her investigation.
- Lara Jean Chorostecki as Beth MacLeish, Peter MacLeish's wife and a member of the conspiracy who goads him into following through with their agenda.
- Rob Morrow as Abe Leonard, a disgraced investigative journalist determined to expose the Kirkman administration's secrets.
- Geoff Pierson as Cornelius Moss, a former President of the United States whom Tom appoints as his Secretary of State.
- Mark Deklin as Senator Jack Bowman, a Republican from Montana who seeks to raise his national profile by opposing Tom's legislative agenda.
- Terry Serpico as Patrick Lloyd, the CEO of a defunct private military firm and the mastermind behind the conspiracy.
- Nick Massouh as Majid Nassar
- Paulino Nunes as Director Carrera
- Melanie Scrofano as Lisa Jordan
- Jeff Lillico as Wyatt
- Vanessa Burns as Shelly

=== Guest ===
- Mykelti Williamson as Admiral Chernow, the Vice Chairman of the Joint Chiefs of Staff who quickly becomes one of Tom's most trusted advisors.
- Kearran Giovanni as Senator Diane Hunter, a Democrat from Massachusetts and the Senate Minority Leader who has a habit of sparring with Bowman.
- Richard Waugh as Jay Whitaker, the Homeland Security Advisor and a member of the conspiracy.

== Episodes ==
No. overall	No. in season	Title	Directed by	Written by	Original release date	US viewers (millions)
1	1	"Pilot"	Paul McGuigan	David Guggenheim	September 21, 2016	10.04
When an explosion destroys the Capitol Building during the State of the Union, Secretary of Housing and Urban Development Tom Kirkman is sworn in as President after his predecessor and all others in the presidential line of succession are killed. Kirkman defuses a military standoff with Iran, but Chairman of the Joint Chiefs of Staff General Harris Cochran and others question his capacity to lead the country. FBI Agent Hannah Wells joins the investigation at the Capitol, where an intact explosive is recovered. As his wife Alex, an immigration attorney, their teenage son Leo and young daughter Penny adjust to life at the White House, President Kirkman enlists the help of speechwriter Seth Wright and delivers his first address to the American people.
2	2	"The First Day"	Brad Turner	Story by : Jon Harmon Feldman; Teleplay by : David Guggenheim	September 28, 2016	7.97
Kirkman's trusted aide Emily Rhodes clashes with ambitious Deputy Chief of Staff Aaron Shore as President Kirkman faces his first challenges in office, including Michigan Governor James Royce violating the civil rights of Muslim citizens. The bombing is linked to the Al-Sakar terrorist network, but Wells informs FBI Deputy Director Jason Atwood of her suspicion that the recovered explosive was left to mislead authorities. Kirkman invites Congresswoman Kimble Hookstraten, the Republican Party's designated survivor, to join him on a visit to the Capitol, where news breaks that a Muslim teenager in Michigan has been fatally beaten by police. Forcing Royce to release everyone he has wrongfully arrested, Kirkman makes another visit to thank emergency workers at the rubble of the Capitol, where a survivor is found.
3	3	"The Confession"	Sergio Mimica-Gezzan	Jennifer Johnson & Paul Redford	October 5, 2016	7.05
Congressman Peter MacLeish is rescued as the bombing's sole survivor. A cyberattack on the White House is used to deliver a video of Al-Sakar leader Majid Nassar claiming responsibility for the bombing, but Atwood presents Wells' alternate theory to Kirkman, who prepares a eulogy for his predecessor President Richmond. Alex confronts Leo for dealing drugs, and a televised interview forces Kirkman to admit he was essentially fired by Richmond on the day of the bombing. Richmond's son Tyler has Hookstraten deliver his father's eulogy instead, leading Shore to leak Nassar's video to distract from questions about Kirkman's legitimacy as president. Kirkman comforts Tyler, and names Shore his new Chief of Staff, appointing Rhodes his Special Advisor instead. Wells discovers MacLeish lied about his whereabouts during the State of the Union.
4	4	"The Enemy"	Paul Edwards	Dana Ledoux Miller & Jon Harmon Feldman	October 12, 2016	7.00
Unwilling to risk an American spy's life in an operation to capture Nassar, President Kirkman fires Cochran for making unauthorized preparations for the attack. Rhodes arrives in Michigan to deal with further civil rights violations by Royce, who refuses to recognize the president's authority, as do the Michigan National Guard. Confronting them with a crowd of protestors, Rhodes convinces Royce to meet with Kirkman, who instead arrests the governor for treason. Alex turns to Hookstraten to save a client from deportation, and Kirkman asks Wright to serve as White House Press Secretary. MacLeish and his wife Beth explain his State of the Union disappearance, but Wells receives an anonymous call to "Find Room 105".
5	5	"The Mission"	Paul Edwards	Sang Kyu Kim & Michael Russell Gunn	October 26, 2016	5.96
President Kirkman meets Commander Max Clarkson, leader of the Navy SEAL team tasked to apprehend Nassar. Kirkman informs Hookstraten and MacLeish, the only remaining members of Congress, of the operation and MacLeish offers his full support, but declines to serves as Speaker of the House. With information from Hookstraten, Wells discovers that Room 105 — a hidden Capitol office where MacLeish was found — was secretly renovated as a bomb shelter by contractors who have mysteriously died, leading Wells and Atwood to realize a powerful conspiracy orchestrated the bombing and ensured MacLeish would survive. Nassar is captured, but Clarkson is killed protecting children taken hostage. Shore learns Alex's ex-boyfriend Jeffrey Myers, who is serving a federal prison sentence, claims to be Leo's father.
6	6	"The Interrogation"	Michael Katleman	Barbie Kligman & Jenna Richman	November 9, 2016	5.56
The nation's governors convene at the White House for tentative plans to rebuild Congress, and MacLeish agrees to be considered for Vice President. The summit is attacked by a Nassar loyalist, and Secret Service Agent Mike Ritter is wounded but kills the gunman. President Kirkman submits to the governors' questions about his fitness to lead, while Alex tries to secure asylum for a plane of Syrian refugees. In exchange for new Congressional elections, Kirkman reluctantly suspends all immigration and reroutes the plane to Canada. Wright strikes up a connection with reporter Lisa Jordan, who has a source linked to Jeffrey Myers. Wells and Atwood interrogate Nassar, who admits to taking credit for the bombing on behalf of the mysterious "Catalan", but is soon found dead in his cell.
7	7	"The Traitor"	Frederick E. O. Toye	Jennifer Johnson & Michael Russell Gunn	November 16, 2016	5.52
Sports hero Brad Weston visits the White House, and Atwood is unable to brief the president on Wells' findings with MacLeish in the room. Visited by Alex in prison, Myers threatens to go public with his claims unless the president secures his early release. Weston is arrested in Russia and revealed to be a CIA asset, leading Kirkman to negotiate a three-way spy trade with Russia and Saudi Arabia, but Weston is actually a Russian double-agent and Wright convinces Jordan to abandon Myers' story for an exclusive on Weston instead. Wells learns from a CIA associate that "Catalan" is Nestor Lozano, an American agent-turned-mercenary who poisoned Nassar. Atwood is threatened by the Capitol bombing conspirators, who have kidnapped his son, to arrange a meeting with President Kirkman.
8	8	"The Results"	Chris Grismer	Paul Redford & Sang Kyu Kim	November 30, 2016	5.45
News breaks of Nassar's death, and a bioterrorism threat against poll workers in Kansas City jeopardize the new Congressional election. Atwood warns Wells that he is under duress but carries out the conspirators' orders, meeting with Kirkman and falsely confessing to killing Nassar. Leo confronts his parents about Myers' claims after being ambushed by a reporter, but ultimately chooses not to read his paternity test results. Realizing Jordan tipped off the reporter, Wright ends their relationship and Kirkman presents her with proof he is Leo's biological father. Proceeding with the election, Kirkman informs Hookstraten and MacLeish of Atwood's confession, and Wells receives another clue from the mysterious caller: "11:14pm". Hookstraten realizes MacLeish intends to undermine Kirkman to assume the presidency himself, unaware MacLeish is in league with the conspirators.
9	9	"The Blueprint"	Richard J. Lewis	Dana Ledoux Miller & Michael Russell Gunn	December 7, 2016	5.18
A new Congress is formed, with Hookstraten as Speaker of the House and MacLeish nominated for Vice President. With FBI Director of Internal Affairs John Forstell investigating Atwood, Wells turns to her colleague Chuck Russink, and the caller's clue leads them to question the events that earned MacLeish the Bronze Star Medal as an Army Ranger. They discover this is a coverup: serving in Kunar Province alongside Lozano, MacLeish took part in massacring several villages. Warning Hookstraten to delay MacLeish's confirmation, Wells is struck by another driver, while MacLeish attempts to discredit her to Kirkman. NSA whistleblower Gabriel Thompson entrusts the president with a classified hard drive, pointing Kirkman and Ritter to a theoretical Pentagon threat assessment used as the exact blueprint for the Capitol bombing, causing Kirkman to realize that a traitor is in their midst.
10	10	"The Oath"	Frederick E. O. Toye	David Guggenheim	December 14, 2016	6.18
Wells evades an assassin who steals her evidence against MacLeish. Cochran, the only surviving recipient of the blueprint, claims an unknown White House official prevented him from seeing it, and President Kirkman tasks Rhodes to uncover who revoked Cochran's clearance. Phone records point to previous Chief of Staff Charles Langdon, and Russink traces the mysterious caller's burner phone, allowing Wells to confront the phone's buyer: Langdon, who was believed killed at the Capitol. Langdon flees as Wells kills the assassin, realizing there is a plan to assassinate Kirkman. As MacLeish is sworn in as Vice President, Rhodes learns Cochran's clearance was denied by Shore. Spotting Lozano taking aim at the president, Wells opens fire before being tackled by Secret Service, but the mercenary takes his shot.
11	11	"Warriors"	Stephen Surjik	Paul Redford & Carol Flint	March 8, 2017	5.86
Wounded, President Kirkman is rushed to the hospital, and Rhodes reveals her suspicions about Shore to Alex, who blames herself for her husband's career putting him in harm’s way. Preparing to undergo surgery and invoke the 25th Amendment, Kirkman warns Hookstraten to be wary of MacLeish, who is temporarily made acting president. In custody, Wells warns Ritter to find Russink, who explains what they have uncovered, and Shore confronts Rhodes for investigating him. Beth MacLeish reassures her husband about the conspirators' grand plan and, to conceal their role in the assassination attempt, he ensures Lozano is killed rather than captured. MacLeish deliberately allows a global financial panic, but Kirkman calms the markets with an appearance from his hospital room, where Wells is brought for a secret meeting with the reinstated president.
12	12	"The End of the Beginning"	Mike Listo	David Guggenheim	March 15, 2017	5.74
Wells explains everything to Kirkman and Ritter, and is tasked to continue her investigation in secret. She is joined by Forstell, while Atwood's son is still missing, leaving Atwood unable to help for fear of the conspirators. Rhodes tells Kirkman about Shore's connection to the blueprint, leaving the president unsure who can be trusted. Shore confides to Hookstraten that MacLeish ordered Lozano not be taken alive, and Atwood's son is found dead. Beth and her fellow conspirators realize Wells is no longer in custody, as Wells baits Alvin Joyner, a complicit soldier from MacLeish's unit, into arranging a meeting with him. Wells attempts to arrest the vice president after witnessing him admit to perjuring himself before Congress, but Beth shoots her husband dead before turning the gun on herself.
13	13	"Backfire"	Tara Nicole Weyr	Sang Kyu Kim & Pierluigi Cothran	March 22, 2017	5.21
President Kirkman announces the vice president's murder by his wife and her suicide to the press. Atwood buries his son, and Alex fears for her own family's safety. Shore confronts Hookstraten for leaking his information to disgraced journalist Abe Leonard, and Kirkman suggests Shore take a break from the White House, appointing Rhodes acting chief of staff. Wells questions Joyner and learns the truth about Kunar: escorting Lozano on a CIA mission, MacLeish's unit was betrayed by a local warlord, shooting their way out and killing numerous civilians; MacLeish saved Lozano, but was radicalized against the US government. Wright mobilizes his staff to discredit Leonard, and Kirkman agrees to relocate Alex and their children to Camp David. Kirkman publicly reveals MacLeish's role in Lozano's death, and Shore is approached by Charles Langdon.
14	14	"Commander-in-Chief"	Frederick E. O. Toye	Michael Russel Gunn	March 29, 2017	5.15
Seeking immunity, Langdon explains that he was seduced into giving the blueprint to "Claudine Poyet", the conspirator who threatened Atwood. Shore claims to have never seen the blueprint, while Langdon confesses that he was threatened into naming Kirkman the designated survivor; on the day of the bombing, Langdon attempted to inform the FBI but was nearly killed when his car was hacked, and went into hiding. Struggling to prevent genocide in the West African nation of Naruba, Kirkman seeks advice from former President Cornelius Moss, who is skeptical of Kirkman's leadership but offers to help fill his new cabinet. Securing the release of American hostages in Naruba, Moss agrees to serve as Secretary of State. Unwilling to remain a liability to the president, Shore resigns, while Kirkman authorizes Wells to use any means necessary to find the conspirators.
15	15	"One Hundred Days"	Kenneth Fink	Dana Ledoux Miller	April 5, 2017	5.19
President Kirkman officially initiates his first hundred days of governing. Alex is forced to walk back a comment about gun control that threatens the administration's agenda, still adjusting to life in the public eye as First Lady. At his first town hall meeting, Kirkman speaks candidly and pledges an end to gun violence. Shore's cousin arrives in D.C. for a job interview, reminding him of his commitment to public service, and Hookstraten offers Shore a job. Wells identifies "Claudine Poyet" as Brooke Mathison and enlists Atwood's help, but fears he is not emotionally ready. She and Russink survive a bomb planted by the conspirators, and link a seemingly empty building to defunct defense contractor Browning Reed. Searching the building, Wells and Atwood are forced to kill Mathison in self-defense, and discover blueprints for further attacks.
16	16	"Party Lines"	Mike Listo	Jenna Richman	April 12, 2017	4.82
Wells reports her findings to Ritter, with blueprints for possible bombings of the Golden Gate Bridge, Hoover Dam, and the Statue of Liberty. Traveling to North Dakota, she and Atwood uncover a Browning Reed facility, revealed to be a decommissioned missile silo. The Kirkman administration struggles to assemble a bipartisan coalition to pass a controversial gun control bill, as both the bill and Hookstraten's leadership are threatened by Montana senator Jack Bowman. Now a strategist for Hookstraten, Shore suggests to Rhodes that the Speaker be considered for Vice President. The bill narrowly passes in the senate by a single vote, thanks to a senator convinced by the strength of the President and First Lady's convictions. Breaking into the missile site, Wells and Atwood discover an entire arsenal of the same bombs used at the Capitol.
17	17	"The Ninth Seat"	Frederick E. O. Toye	Paul Redford	April 19, 2017	5.06
In Iraq, Abe Leonard learns Lozano paid Al-Sakar to claim responsibility for the Capitol attack. Returning to D.C., he approaches Wright and Hookstraten for comment, and Shore warns Forstell, who informs the president. Leonard is contacted by a mysterious source, pointing his investigation toward Wells. With the help of Kirkman's mentor, law professor Julia Rombauer, a new Supreme Court is ready for confirmation but Senator Bowman blocks the nominee for Chief Justice. Kirkman's team suggest Rombauer herself, but she reveals she has early onset dementia and proposes the other eight seats on the Court be filled as planned, leaving the ninth to be chosen by the next president, and Bowman agrees. Wells and Atwood discover a clandestine group gathering at the missile site, with a manifesto to overthrow the American government, as a helicopter arrives with Lozano himself.
18	18	"Lazarus"	Chris Grismer	Jennifer Johnson	April 26, 2017	5.11
Shot at by the conspirators, Wells escapes with a wounded Atwood. Leonard links his source to the White House and attempts to question Atwood, and Wells receives surveillance footage of Lozano from Homeland Security Advisor Jay Whitaker. Signing the gun control bill into law, Kirkman privately asks Hookstraten to be vetted for vice president, but a disgruntled former staffer leaks a damaging story about her, and she torpedoes his career in return. Suspecting the conspirators have a White House insider, Wells determines that a decoy was killed in Lozano's place. She and Forstell connect the dead man to Browning Reed's CEO, Patrick Lloyd, who claims the bombs are the company's property but repeats points from the conspirators' manifesto. Wells is kidnapped by Lozano, who is in league with Whitaker, revealed to be manipulating Leonard as his source.
19	19	"Misalliance"	Norberto Barba	Dana Ledoux Miller & Jenna Richman	May 3, 2017	4.62
Tyler Richmond asks for Kirkman's help with arts education funding, and the president turns to Hookstraten, who is under investigation by the House Ethics Committee for her recent scandal. Hookstraten agrees to resign her seat in the House in exchange for securing the arts education grant, and Kirkman nominates her to serve as the new Secretary of Education. Atwood plants a tracking device on Lloyd and records him meeting with Whitaker about the conspirators' plans, but is shot dead by Lozano. Forstell and Ritter realize Wells has been abducted, and that the conspirators' White House insider has been deleting incriminating files, which could allow them to track down the traitor. Held captive in a shipping container, Wells subdues one of her abductors, only to find herself on a cargo ship in the middle of the ocean.
20	20	"Bombshell"	Sharat Raju	Sang Kyu Kim	May 10, 2017	4.92
Realizing the 300,000 bombs are aboard the ship, Wells sends a mayday message before being recaptured, and Lozano taunts her with Atwood's death. In Toronto, Wright joins Kirkman and Moss for the president's first NATO summit, but plans to discuss nuclear disarmament are derailed by the publication of Leonard's story, revealing Al-Sakar was not behind the Capitol attack. Kirkman confides in Moss that the allegations are true, but makes progress with their international allies. Lloyd orders Whitaker to dispose of Leonard, who is questioned by the FBI. Ritter enlists Russink to trace the traitor's digital trail inside the West Wing, but Whitaker covers his tracks. Tracing Wells' distress call, Forstell finds the ship docked in Baltimore and apprehends Lozano's men, but a search of the ship turns up empty. Wells awakens in a bomb-filled van at FBI headquarters, with minutes until detonation.
21	21	"Brace for Impact"	Frederick E. O. Toye	David Guggenheim	May 17, 2017	5.07
Driving the van into the Potomac River before it explodes, Wells briefs the president and leads a raid on Lloyd's ranch, but he escapes. On Lloyd's orders, Whitaker creates fake credentials for Lozano to infiltrate the Pentagon and complete a massive data transfer. Kirkman persuades Leonard to hold back his story about Atwood's arrest for Nassar's murder as a matter of national security, and brings in Shore to find the traitor, with help from General Cochran. Wells pursues Lozano into a construction site, where a brutal fistfight leaves him fatally impaled on rebar. She realizes Atwood sent her the incriminating footage of Lloyd meeting with Whitaker, who is arrested, leading to the capture of conspirators across the country. Kirkman explains the full conspiracy to Wright, Rhodes, and Shore, who agrees to rejoin the White House. With Moss as his designated survivor, President Kirkman addresses Congress and reveals the truth about the Capitol attack to the world. Reunited with his family, Kirkman learns that Lozano sent the Pentagon's most sensitive intelligence to Lloyd, who is still at large.

== Production ==
=== Development ===
Designated Survivor was ordered straight to series by ABC in December 2015, with a formal announcement of 13 episodes in May 2016. A month later, ABC revealed that the series would premiere on September 21, 2016. Eight days after the premiere, on September 29, 2016, ABC gave the series a full season order.

Created by David Guggenheim, the series is executive produced by Simon Kinberg, Sutherland, Suzan Bymel, Aditya Sood, and Nick Pepper. Paul McGuigan directed the pilot episode. Amy B. Harris was set to be the showrunner in February 2016, but after the series' official pick-up in May, it was announced she would be stepping down due to creative differences, and that Jon Harmon Feldman was in talks to replace her. In July 2016, Feldman was confirmed as showrunner/executive producer. In December 2016, Jeff Melvoin was hired as showrunner, replacing the departing Feldman. Kal Penn, formerly associate director in the White House's Office of Public Engagement, serves as a consultant for the series as well as acting in the main cast.

=== Writing ===
Producers Jon Harmon Feldman and Guggenheim described the series as more than one genre, drawing inspiration from other political thriller-dramas, with Guggenheim explaining, "There is a West Wing component of a man governing and his team governing our nation at this critical time. It's also the Homeland aspect of investigating the conspiracy. It also has a House of Cards component, which is the characters and the business of government through the eyes of these characters."

=== Casting ===
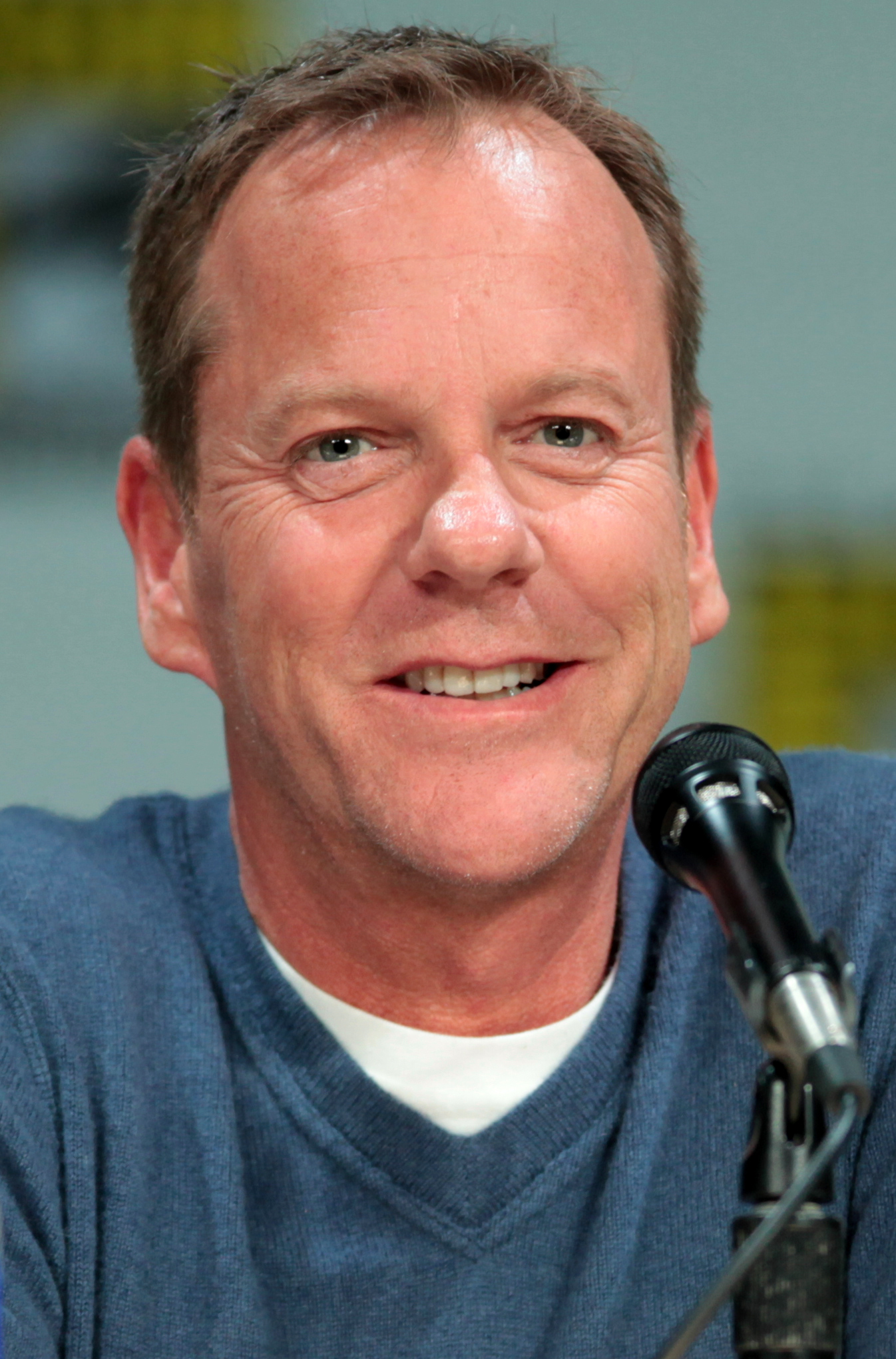
Kiefer Sutherland plays the lead role, Tom Kirkman

Kiefer Sutherland joined the cast in December 2015, playing Tom Kirkman, the Secretary of Housing and Urban Development who suddenly becomes President. Sutherland had previously no intention of doing television again, but changed his mind after reading the first script of the series, saying, "I remember getting to the end of the script and thinking I was potentially holding the next 10 years of my life in my hands."

In February 2016, it was announced that Kal Penn, Maggie Q, Natascha McElhone, and Italia Ricci had been cast as Seth Wright, Kirkman's speech writer; Hannah, the lead FBI agent on the bombing of the Capitol; Kirkman's wife, an EEOC attorney; and Emily, Kirkman's Chief of Staff, respectively. Shortly after, Adan Canto had joined the series as Aaron Shore, the White House Deputy Chief of Staff. In early March, LaMonica Garrett joined the cast as Mike Ritter, Kirkman's Secret Service agent, and Tanner Buchanan and Mckenna Grace had been cast as Kirkman's children.

In July 2016, Malik Yoba was announced for a recurring role as Jason Atwood, the seasoned deputy director of the FBI, to appear in seven episodes, while Virginia Madsen had been cast in the recurring role of Kimble Hookstraten, a conservative Congresswoman and the designated survivor for the rival political party. A month later, Ashley Zukerman joined the series in a recurring role as Peter MacLeish, an Afghan War veteran and popular third-term Congressman. In September 2016, Mykelti Williamson was cast as Admiral Chernow, a career military man and the Chairman of the Joint Chiefs of Staff. On November 4, 2016, it was announced that Mariana Klaveno had been cast for the show as the Dark-Haired Woman, a clandestine operator in league with the people behind the Capitol attack.

== Reception ==
=== Critical response ===
Review aggregator website Rotten Tomatoes gave the first season an approval rating of 85% based on 52 reviews, with an average rating of 6.98/10. The site's critical consensus reads, "Kiefer Sutherland skillfully delivers the drama in Designated Survivor, a fast-paced, quickly engrossing escapist political action fantasy." Metacritic reported a score of 71 out of 100 based on 35 reviews, indicating "generally favorable" reviews.

Terri Schwartz from IGN gave the first episode a rating of 8.0/10, saying, "Designated Survivor is a strong debut for a show that will fit well alongside Quantico and Scandal in ABC's government-set political drama lineup." Variety said that the episode "does everything it needs to, checking off the necessary boxes for the unwilling American hero-president in efficient, compelling scenes." Chuck Barney from Mercury News called the first episode "suspenseful". Writing for TV Insider, Matt Roush compared Designated Survivor with other series as he said "fall's niftiest new drama has West Wing idealism, Homeland suspense and House of Cards political intrigue in its robust and compelling DNA." Zack Handlen from The A.V. Club wrote positively about the show and the premiere, praising Sutherland's performance and commented on the symbol of Sutherland's glasses as he said, "The glasses he's wearing serve as a way to tell us this is a different kind of hero, but they're also a form of camouflage, making it easier for us to understand why so many people would underestimate this man."

The editors of TV Guide placed Designated Survivor first among the top ten picks for the most anticipated new shows of the 2016–17 season. In writer Alexander Zalben's overall review, he pointed out the keys to one of the strongest pilots he had seen so far: "Designated Survivor is the rare show that delivers on the hype, and surpasses it," and later stating "It's shocking that a show can balance all of these elements, but credit a magnetic cast that hits the ground running, a crack script that makes the first hour feel like 10 minutes and, of course, Sutherland as the anchor that keeps it all grounded." Zalben's review concluded with this recommendation: "There's a reason Designated Survivor wasn't just the top pick across all of our Editors' lists, but also on the list compiled from TVGuide.com viewers' Watchlist adds: this is a show that delivers on its premise, feels timely, and most importantly, is a ton of fun." The New York Times reviewed the second episode with its dialogue "still being wooden, but the compelling moments are adding up", also noting the use of historical references and the title sequence.

On the other hand, after watching the first episode of the first season, The Guardian's Brian Moylan criticized the dialogue, writing in his review that "this drama needs dialogue that won’t make the citizenry’s eyeballs roll", adding that the show features "meaningless platitudes" of a "we’re going to do this my way" attitude, and concluded by writing, "All we’re left with is a really great concept without the backing of a real leader behind it." Moylan also wrote that "there’s not enough family tension for it to be a domestic drama, not enough government intrigue to make it a political show, and not enough investigation to make it a procedural." TVLine's Dave Nemetz drew references between Kirkman and Jack Bauer, Kiefer Sutherland's role in drama thriller 24, writing that "Sutherland does a good job portraying Kirkman’s deep ambivalence about the situation he’s been handed. But when he has to play hardball with an Iranian ambassador, the tough talk comes too easily to him. It’s like Kirkman has been possessed by the ghost of Jack Bauer". Nemetz also questioned the series' longevity; "As compelling as Designated Survivor's concept is, it’s hard to see how it will sustain itself as a weekly series".

=== Ratings ===
The first episode set a record for DVR viewers with 7.67 million, surpassing the September 25, 2014, record of almost 7 million set by the pilot of How to Get Away with Murder.

Viewership and ratings per episode of Designated Survivor season 1
No.	Title	Air date	Rating/share (18–49)	Viewers (millions)	DVR (18–49)	DVR viewers (millions)	Total (18–49)	Total viewers (millions)
1	"Pilot"	September 21, 2016	2.2/8	10.04	2.2	7.67	4.4	17.71
2	"The First Day"	September 28, 2016	1.8/6	7.97	2.1	7.65	3.9	15.62
3	"The Confession"	October 5, 2016	1.6/6	7.05	1.9	7.32	3.5	14.33
4	"The Enemy"	October 12, 2016	1.6/6	7.00	1.9	6.89	3.5	13.89
5	"The Mission"	October 26, 2016	1.2/5	5.96	2.0	7.07	3.2	13.03
6	"The Interrogation"	November 9, 2016	1.2/4	5.56	1.8	6.36	3.0	11.92
7	"The Traitor"	November 16, 2016	1.2/4	5.52	1.7	6.40	2.9	11.92
8	"The Results"	November 30, 2016	1.3/4	5.45	1.7	6.50	3.0	11.95
9	"The Blueprint"	December 7, 2016	1.1/4	5.18	1.7	6.69	2.8	11.88
10	"The Oath"	December 14, 2016	1.2/4	6.17	1.7	6.19	2.9	12.36
11	"Warriors"	March 8, 2017	1.3/5	5.86	1.5	5.80	2.8	11.69
12	"The End of the Beginning"	March 15, 2017	1.3/5	5.74	1.4	5.53	2.7	11.27
13	"Backfire"	March 22, 2017	1.1/4	5.21	1.4	5.66	2.5	10.87
14	"Commander-in-Chief"	March 29, 2017	1.1/4	5.15	1.5	5.79	2.6	10.94
15	"One Hundred Days"	April 5, 2017	1.1/4	5.19	1.5	5.68	2.6	10.87
16	"Party Lines"	April 12, 2017	0.9/3	4.82	1.4	5.43	2.3	10.31
17	"The Ninth Seat"	April 19, 2017	1.0/4	5.06	1.4	5.50	2.4	10.56
18	"Lazarus"	April 26, 2017	1.1/4	5.11	—N/a	—N/a	—N/a	—N/a
19	"Misalliance"	May 3, 2017	0.9/4	4.62	1.4	5.42	2.3	10.04
20	"Bombshell"	May 10, 2017	1.0/4	4.92	1.2	5.23	2.2	10.15
21	"Brace for Impact"	May 17, 2017	1.1/4	5.07	1.2	5.30	2.3	10.37
