= Pilot (Designated Survivor) =

- Designated Survivor episode
- Episode no.: Season 1 Episode 1
- Directed by: Paul McGuigan
- Written by: David Guggenheim
- Original air date: September 21, 2016
- Running time: 44 minutes

Episode chronology
← Previous —	Next → "The First Day"
- Designated Survivor season 1

"Pilot" is the first episode in the American political drama series Designated Survivor. It was aired on ABC on September 21, 2016 in the United States, CTV in Canada, and on Netflix worldwide. The episode shows Thomas "Tom" Kirkman (Kiefer Sutherland), a low-ranking member of the US Cabinet, unexpectedly ascending to the rank of President of the United States after his predecessor and every other member of the presidential line of succession is killed in a terrorist attack.

== Synopsis ==
On the night of January 20, U.S. Secretary of Housing and Urban Development Thomas Kirkman and his wife Alex are watching the State of the Union address from a secure location. Earlier that day, he had been offered the position of Ambassador to the International Civil Aviation Organization (which, in practice, was a way of firing him). He is not in attendance himself because, as a final snub, he has been nominated the designated survivor – a custom used every time the President, Vice President, and other members of the line of succession are gathered in a single place (such as at State of the Union addresses and Presidential inaugurations), where a low-ranking person in the line of succession is kept in a secret location to ensure that someone can succeed to the Presidency in the event of a catastrophe.

Unexpectedly, the news feed cuts out. Moments later, his Secret Service detail rushes into the room, and when Kirkman opens the security shutter on the window, he sees an enormous fireball that has engulfed the Capitol Building. Kirkman and his wife are rushed from their safe house, while another security detail goes off to find their children. En route to the White House, Kirkman’s body guard receives confirmation that the blast has killed everyone who attended the State of the Union, including President Richmond, the Vice President, the Speaker of the House, the rest of the Cabinet, everyone in both houses of Congress, many of the Joint Chiefs of Staff, and all nine of the Supreme Court Justices. Under the Presidential Succession Act, Kirkman is now President of the United States.

Upon arrival at the White House, Kirkman (dressed in jeans and a hoodie) is sworn in by a DC appellate judge. He is then escorted by Richmond’s Deputy Chief of Staff Aaron Shore to the Presidential Emergency Operations Center, which is abuzz with chaos in the aftermath of the bombing. The most senior military officer in the room, General Harris Cochrane, demands that the US immediately move onto a war footing. Overwhelmed, Kirkman goes to the bathroom to vomit. In the next cubicle, speech writer Seth Wright offers sympathy and, not realizing who it is, expresses doubt in Kirkman due to his lack of political experience and seniority (as his position would normally put him twelfth in the line of succession). When he emerges, Kirkman brushes aside his embarrassment and asks Seth to write him a speech.

Meanwhile, after some difficulty locating the President’s son Leo, both of the President’s children arrive at the White House, as does his Chief of Staff Emily Rhodes. President Kirkman is informed that the Iranian Navy is moving several destroyers to the Strait of Hormuz, a major provocation. General Cochrane suggests a swift show of force, but Kirkman decides instead to call a meeting with the Iranian Ambassador, and orders Cochrane to scramble bombers. At the meeting, Kirkman (dressed in a borrowed suit) – in a surprising display of strength – warns the Ambassador that he is willing to authorize an attack on Tehran if the destroyers are not pulled back. Kirkman then delivers Seth’s speech to the nation, while Shore and Cochrane discuss whether he should be removed.

Elsewhere in DC, FBI agent Hannah Wells attempts to phone Senator Scott Wheeler, her lover who was present at the State of the Union, but receives no answer. She is then called away by her boss to join the investigation into the bombing. Instead of going back to HQ, she goes to the bomb site, and convinces Deputy Director Jason Atwood to let her join in. After another unsuccessful attempt at trying to reach Scott, a bomb is located amongst the rubble, which turns out not to be active. Upon investigating the bomb, it is discovered to be a Soviet anti-tank mine most commonly used by jihadist terror groups. However, Hannah expresses doubt that this is the case, because there was no chatter from any such groups. This could additionally suggest that the group who bombed the Capitol has not yet finished.

== Reception ==
The episode received mixed-to-positive reviews, with Laura Akers of Den of Geek noting that the show had similarities with political drama The West Wing, and, while stating that the pilot episode had a somewhat shaky start, observing that the “split focus” between Kirkman and Wells’ storylines was “unwieldy,” it had “all the ingredients of an interesting and possibly even compelling series.” Brian Moylan of The Guardian, meanwhile, gave a negative review, with particular criticism focusing on the dialogue. Terri Schwartz of IGN praised the episode for its storyline, and in particular Sutherland’s performance.

== See also ==
- First Family of the United States
