= Stolen (2012 film) =

2012 film by Simon West

- Theatrical release poster
- Directed by: Simon West
- Written by: David Guggenheim
- Produced by: Jesse Kennedy; Matthew Joynes; René Besson
- Starring: Nicolas Cage; Danny Huston; Malin Åkerman; M. C. Gainey; Sami Gayle; Mark Valley; Josh Lucas
- Cinematography: Jim Whitaker
- Edited by: Glen Scantlebury
- Music by: Mark Isham
- Production companies: Millennium Entertainment; Nu Image Films; Saturn Films; Wonderland Sound and Vision
- Distributed by: Millennium Films
- Release date: September 14, 2012
- Running time: 96 minutes
- Country: United States
- Language: English
- Budget: $35 million
- Box office: $18 million

Stolen is a 2012 American action thriller film directed by Simon West and starring Nicolas Cage, Danny Huston, Malin Åkerman, M. C. Gainey, Sami Gayle, Mark Valley and Josh Lucas. The film follows a former thief who has 12 hours to find $10 million and save his daughter from his former partner. It was released in the United States on September 14, 2012.

== Plot ==
In New Orleans, Will Montgomery and Vincent Kinsey are preparing for a heist, aided by Riley, their getaway driver, and Hoyt, a computer security expert. They are watched by FBI agent Tim Harlend, who knows that Will and Vincent have been casing a jewelry store for several weeks and plans to arrest them mid-crime.

Will and Vincent break into the neighboring toy store, blowing the adjacent wall. Harlend sends his agents into the jewelry store, but Will and Vincent are not there, having instead used the toy store to gain access to a bank. In the bank vault, Will collects $10 million in wrapped bills and drags away Vincent eyeing a stack of gold bars. Will and Vincent come across a janitor in a back alley that Vincent tries to kill but Will stops him, causing Vincent to accidentally shoot himself in the leg. As the escape van pulls up, Vincent gets in and drives off, leaving Will stranded. With the FBI closing fast Will burns the money in a trash fire. After a car chase Will is cornered in an abandoned building where the FBI arrest him yet find no evidence of the money.

Eight years later, Will is released from prison. He is taken back to New Orleans by Harlend, who warns him he will be watched carefully, as the FBI believe he stashed the $10 million before his arrest. Will returns to his daughter Alison, finding that she is struggling with abandonment issues. She refuses to talk to him, instead handing over a package addressed to Will left there that morning. Alison leaves in a taxi which has been following Will since his release.

Will goes to a local bar where Riley's now working. A cell phone inside the package rings; the caller reveals himself to be Vincent, driver of the taxi, and demands the $10 million from the heist within 12 hours or he will kill Alison. Vincent says he will be tracking Will via the phone and will make regular calls that Will must answer or his daughter will die. Vincent drugs Alison and locks her in the taxi's trunk.

Will, aware that Harlend's men are also following him, uses the Fat Tuesday celebration to escape. He purchases a second cell phone to redirect calls from the first, then plants the first phone on a leaving train to throw Vincent off. Will explains the situation to Harlend, vowing that he burnt the $10 million just before he was arrested, and asks for help. Harlend doesn't believe Will, Vincent was reported dead a year prior, a burnt body identified by DNA.

Will steal FBI credentials to find the current address of Hoyt, who is working with Vincent to track the phone. Will locates Hoyt and a fight breaks out between them until FBI agents arrive and kill Hoyt. Will escapes, then talks to the taxi dispatcher, where they help identify Vincent's taxi and location. Will finds that Vincent's taxi belongs to another driver.

Will is recaptured by Harlend's men, but when they do not let him answer Vincent's call while driving, Will grabs the phone and escapes after causing the car to crash. Will tells Vincent the money is gone, but that he will come up with it somehow. With Riley's help, Will tunnels below the bank they'd robbed for the $10 million, using a thermal lance to melt enough gold to pay the ransom.

Will takes the gold to Vincent at an abandoned amusement park. Vincent lights the taxi on fire with Alison still inside. Will and Vincent fight and Will is shot by Vincent. Will then douses Vincent in gasoline and sets him ablaze. Will drives the taxi straight into Vincent, then into a nearby pond.

As he races to free Alison from the submerging vehicle, Will is attacked by Vincent. Will impales him on a crowbar which he uses to free Alison from the trunk. Harlend arrives by helicopter, assuring Alison that her father will be okay.

Later, Will, Riley, and Alison are enjoying an afternoon barbecue, watched by Harlend from a distance because some of the bank gold is still missing. Will finds a chunk of the missing gold in Riley's truck and Will throws the gold into the bayou. Harlend quits monitoring Will. Unbeknownst to Harlend, Will threw away a decoy, not the nugget of gold.

== Cast ==
- Nicolas Cage as Will Montgomery
- Danny Huston as Agent Tim Harlend
- Malin Åkerman as Riley Simms
- Sami Gayle as Alison Loeb
- Mark Valley as Agent Fletcher
- M. C. Gainey as Donald Hoyt
- Josh Lucas as Vincent Kinsey
- Tanc Sade as Pete
- Demetrice J. Nguyen as Mark
- Sam Velasquez as Knuckles

== Production ==
David Guggenheim wrote the original script under the title of Medallion around 2004 which centered on a robber who upon his release from prison after a heist gone bad is contacted by his ex-partner informing him that his daughter has been kidnapped and locked in the trunk of a taxi and will only give him the taxi medallion number in exchange for the loot from the heist. In May 2010, it was reported that Clive Owen would star in the film for producers GK Films and Wonderland Sound and Vision with production motivated by the recent high profile sales of other Guggenheim penned scripts such as Safe House with production anticipated to commence in Fall of that year in New York City and Toronto. In October of that year, it was Simon West had joined the film as director but Clive Owen was no longer attached to star. Jason Statham had reportedly been considered for the lead at one point. By December, it was reported that Nicolas Cage had signed on to star while Nu Image/Millennium Films had come on board as a financier of the film.

Filming began March 2012 in New Orleans. It was released in U.S. theaters on September 14, 2012, and by Lionsgate in the UK on March 22, 2013.

== Reception ==
On Rotten Tomatoes, the film holds an approval rating of 18% based on 22 reviews, with an average rating of 4.01/10. On Metacritic the film has a weighted average score of 43 out of 100, based on four critics, indicating "mixed or average reviews".

Stolen was a box office bomb in the United States, receiving little publicity and grossing just $183,125 across 141 screens on its opening weekend. The film was pulled from theaters after two weeks, making a total of $304,318. The film grossed $17,967,746 worldwide.
