= The Acid House (film) =

- Theatrical release poster
- Directed by: Paul McGuigan
- Written by: Irvine Welsh
- Based on: The Acid House by Irvine Welsh
- Produced by: David Muir; Alex Usborne
- Starring: Maurice Roëves; Stephen McCole; Kevin McKidd; Michelle Gomez; Gary McCormack; Ewen Bremner; Martin Clunes; Jemma Redgrave
- Cinematography: Alasdair Walker
- Edited by: Andrew Hulme
- Music by: Dan Muir
- Production companies: Channel Four Films; Glasgow Film Fund; Umbrella Productions; Picture Palace North
- Distributed by: FilmFour Distributors
- Release dates: May 1998 (Cannes Film Market); 1 January 1999 (UK)
- Running time: 111 minutes
- Country: United Kingdom
- Language: English

The Acid House is a 1998 British film adaptation of Irvine Welsh's short story collection The Acid House directed by Paul McGuigan. Welsh himself wrote the screenplay and appears as a minor character in the film. All three sections are independent, but are linked by the setting of Edinburgh and the reappearance of incidental characters, in particular Maurice Roëves, who appears variously as an inebriated wedding guest, a figure in a dream, and a pub patron. All three of his parts symbolise a human manifestation of God.

== Plot ==
The film dramatises three stories from the book:

In "The Granton Star Cause", a comedy, Boab is an aimless layabout having a rotten day. His parents throw him out of the house so they can indulge in sado-masochism, and he is sacked from his job, dumped by his girlfriend, and dropped from his football team. Moping at a bar, Boab is approached by a profane stranger claiming to be God who berates him for his wasted life and transforms him into a housefly as punishment. In his fly form, Boab buzzes around his previous haunts, where he is occasionally recognized, and takes revenge against people he perceives to have wronged him. The segment has elements of Franz Kafka's The Metamorphosis.

In "A Soft Touch", Johnny marries Catriona, a slovenly part-time prostitute, in a shotgun wedding. Their baby Chantal is born around the same time that the arrogant Larry moves in to the flat above them. Johnny is mostly left to care for Chantal, and Catriona starts sleeping with Larry. Johnny increasingly finds himself being taken advantage of and mistreated by both Larry and Catriona, but can't do anything about it due to his kindhearted nature.

The third segment, "The Acid House", uses surrealism to tell a story about marriage, babies, and the excesses of chemical dependency. One night, raver Coco Brice takes a particularly strong acid. His psychedelic experience occurs at the same time as a bolt of lightning, resulting in Coco exchanging bodies with the newborn baby of middle-class couple Rory and Jenny.

== Cast ==
=== "The Granton Star Cause" ===
- Maurice Roëves as God
- Stephen McCole as Boab
- Garry Sweeney as Kev
- Jenny McCrindle as Evelyn
- Simon Weir as Tambo
- Iain Andrew as Grant
- Irvine Welsh as Parkie
- Pat Stanton as Barman
- Alex Howden as Boab Snr
- Annie Louise Ross as Doreen (as Ann Louise Ross)
- Dennis O'Connor as PC Cochrane
- John Gardner as Sgt. Morrison
- William Blair as Workmate
- Gary McCormack as Workmate
- Malcolm Shields as Workmate
- Stewart Preston as Rafferty
- Callum Stewart as boy playing football

=== "A Soft Touch" ===
- Maurice Roëves as Drunk
- Kevin McKidd as Johnny
- Michelle Gomez as Catriona
- Tam Dean Burn as Alec
- Scott Imrie as Pool Player
- Niall Greig Fulton as Alan
- Cas Harkins as Skanko
- Morgan Simpson as Chantal, Baby
- Marnie Kidd as Chantal, Toddler
- Alison Peebles as Mother
- Joanne Riley as New Girl
- Katie Echlin as Wendy
- William 'Giggs' McGuigan as Pub Singer
- William Blair as Deck
- Gary McCormack as Larry

=== "The Acid House" ===
- Maurice Roëves as Priest
- Ewen Bremner as Colin 'Coco' Bryce
- Martin Clunes as Rory
- Jemma Redgrave as Jenny
- Arlene Cockburn as Kirsty
- Jane Stabler as Emma
- Doug Eadie as Coco's Father
- Andrea McKenna as Coco's Mother
- Cas Harkins as Skanko
- Billy McElhaney as Felix the Paramedic
- Ricky Callan as Tam the Driver
- Barbara Rafferty as Dr. Callaghan
- Stephen Docherty as Nurse Boyd
- Ronnie McCann as Andy

== Production ==
"The Granton Star Cause" segment is named after an Edinburgh housing district and was filmed on location in Muirhouse and Pilton, including Ferry Road Drive. "A Soft Touch" was filmed on location in Niddrie.

== Release ==
The first chapter of the story, "The Granton Star Cause", premiered before completion of the other two parts. It was also shown on Channel 4 on August 3, 1997. The short film offended elements of the UK tabloid press with a depiction of a cynical, jaded, foul-mouthed God. Filming of "A Soft Touch" and "The Acid House" concluded in late 1997. The completed film premiered at the Marché du Film (Cannes Film Market) in May 1998, and was released in the UK on January 1, 1999.

In the United States, the film was screened in limited release on August 6, 1999. In some English-speaking countries such as Canada and the US, it was screened with subtitles because of the Scots vernacular and heavy Edinburgh accents.

== Reception ==
On review aggregate website Rotten Tomatoes, The Acid House has a rating of 45% based on 20 reviews. The site's critics consensus reads, "Narratively stagnant and stylistically oppressive, The Acid House proves to be a bad trip." Metacritic, which uses a weighted average, assigned the film a score of 55 out of 100, based on 15 critics, indicating "mixed or average" reviews.

In Variety, Brendan Kelly wrote the film makes "'Trainspotting' look like a mild-mannered youth comedy" in comparison. He added, "The producers of this British pic have said that they wanted the film to be 100% uncut, undiluted Irvine Welsh, and that’s exactly what it is, for better or worse. An even tougher, grimmer portrait of life in inner-city Edinburgh than 'Trainspotting,' the striking film will click with hard-core Welsh fans, but its pessimistic tone and unrelenting brutality will make it a tough slog for mainstream auds." Stephen Holden of The New York Times wrote, "If 'The Acid House'...is as flashy a piece of work as 'Trainspotting,' it lacks its forerunner's sociological depth."
