= The Union (2024 film) =

Film by Julian Farino

- Release poster
- Directed by: Julian Farino
- Screenplay by: Joe Barton; David Guggenheim
- Story by: David Guggenheim
- Produced by: Mark Wahlberg; Stephen Levinson; Jeff Waxman
- Starring: Mark Wahlberg; Halle Berry; Mike Colter; Adewale Akinnuoye-Agbaje; Jessica De Gouw; Alice Lee; Jackie Earle Haley; J. K. Simmons
- Cinematography: Alan Stewart
- Edited by: Pia Di Ciaula
- Music by: Rupert Gregson-Williams
- Production company: Municipal Pictures
- Distributed by: Netflix
- Release date: August 16, 2024
- Running time: 107 minutes
- Country: United States
- Language: English
- Budget: $134 million

The Union is a 2024 American spy action comedy thriller film directed by Julian Farino from a screenplay by Joe Barton and David Guggenheim. The film stars Mark Wahlberg, Halle Berry, Mike Colter, Adewale Akinnuoye-Agbaje, Alice Lee, Jackie Earle Haley, and J. K. Simmons. The Union was released by Netflix on August 16, 2024 to mixed reviews.

== Plot ==
Mike McKenna is a construction worker from Paterson, New Jersey whose life changes unexpectedly when his high school sweetheart Roxanne Hall re-enters his life after 25 years. She is now a secret agent for a covert organization known as "The Union" and recruits him, initially against his will.

Tranquilized by Rox, Mike wakes hours later in London. Rox explains how she got him there, and he hurries out of the luxurious hotel and meets her boss Tom Brennan. They brief him on a high-stakes mission, claiming his unassuming identity is the perfect cover.

The Union is in turmoil after a botched operation in Trieste, which led to several agents' deaths. In desperate need of a fresh face, they turn to Mike, a "nobody," for a critical mission to retrieve government intelligence about law enforcement agents in various agencies.

The briefcase containing the sensitive information on individuals who have served allied Western nations is being auctioned off to the highest bidder. The perilous operation spans across Europe and includes a series of international threats, including Iranian intelligence, North Korean agents, and Russian spies.

Mike goes through vigorous training, normally done over six months but condensed to under two weeks. He is given another identity, undergoes psychological tests, is trained in hand-to-hand combat and sharpshooting, all while trying to keep up with the highly skilled Roxanne.

Sent by The Union with five million dollars to buy an opportunity to bid at the intel auction, Mike is immediately ambushed by a group who The Union believe is another interested party. The team barely gets him out in time, but the auction access device gets irreparably damaged. Out of money, The Union decides to also fight dirty, tracking down the Koreans' mercenaries in hopes of acquiring theirs.

The Union successfully infiltrates the Koreans, grabbing their device. However, the Union's communications expert is discovered dead in the van. The team watches from a distance in horror as their headquarters explodes. Forced to go into hiding, the next evening the team regroups in a subterranean location for the auction. Tom bids with CIA money, while Foreman works on tracing Quinn's location and Rox and Mike speed to reach her.

Juliet Quinn is forced by Rox and Mike to take them to the briefcase. At her place, just before they are to leave with it, Nick Faraday arrives at the door. Warning that they are all in grave danger, he convinces Rox to let him in. It is revealed that Nick is one of the six Union agents believed to have died in Trieste. He claims Tom Brennan, the founder of The Union, is the mole, then Mike discovers that Nick was Rox's husband.

Convinced to meet with a CIA liaison at a bridge the next day, Rox and Mike leave together with the briefcase. In the car, Mike is upset she had not mentioned Nick, and she insists they had been separated. Made to feel he has lived a small life, Mike announces he is done, getting out of the car.

However, Mike cools off and shows up at the bridge drop off in the morning where they both apologize. Nick calls Rox, revealing he has framed her and Brennan, as he's planning to sell the intel to the Iranians. He got tired of never getting credit nor decent reimbursement for work at The Union. Mike and Rox escape as the CIA closes in.

Tracking Nick to Istria, Rox interrupts the deal with the Iranians, who pull out. Then Juliet also pulls out with her men. Mike suddenly appears on a motorbike and Rox tosses him the briefcase. After a chase around the town by the Iranians, they finally are back together, when Nick and Mike have a stand off. So as to not risk Rox's life, Mike puts down his gun. During a subsequent car chase, Rox pauses when she believes Mike died (but had jumped out of the car before it crashed down the hill). Finally they catch up to Nick on the dock, who chooses to die rather than let Rox take him to jail.

On Sunday, at the wedding, Rox shows up. They call each other out for showing they cared about each other. As they are about to sneak off together, Brennan appears and invites Mike to join them for an upcoming mission in Morocco.

== Cast ==
- Mark Wahlberg as Mike McKenna
- Halle Berry as Roxanne Hall
- Mike Colter as Nick Faraday
- Adewale Akinnuoye-Agbaje as Frank Pfeiffer
- Jessica De Gouw as Juliet Quinn
- Alice Lee as Athena Kim
- Jackie Earle Haley as Foreman
- J. K. Simmons as Tom Brennan
- Lorraine Bracco as Lorraine McKenna
- Dana Delany as Nicole
- Patch Darragh as Bobby Breslin
- James McMenamin as Johnny Healy
- Juan Carlos Hernandez as Billy Lewis
- Stephen Campbell Moore as Cameron Foster

== Production ==
It was announced in May 2020 that Netflix had purchased the pitch for Our Man from Jersey (later titled to The Union), which would see Mark Wahlberg star. Joe Barton and David Guggenheim wrote the screenplay from a story by Stephen Levinson. In March 2021, Halle Berry was cast to co-star alongside Wahlberg. In May 2022, J. K. Simmons, Jackie Earle Haley, Adewale Akinnuoye-Agbaje, Jessica De Gouw and Alice Lee were added to the cast.

Filming had commenced in March 2022, with shooting to take place in London, New Jersey, and Piran, Slovenia. The production caused a disturbance in May 2022 due to noise and air pollution from filming in Fitzrovia. In September 2022, filming occurred in Ponterosso Trieste, Italy. It was also partially shot in BT Tower in UK. Also in fall 2022, filming occurred in Rakalj and Rovinj, Croatia.

== Release ==
The Union was released by Netflix on August 16, 2024.

== Reception ==
On the review aggregator website Rotten Tomatoes, 36% of 77 critics' reviews are positive, with an average rating of 4.7/10. The website's consensus reads: "While its imprint may dissolve soon after the credits roll, The Union could provide sufficient thrills to household duties." Metacritic, which uses a weighted average, assigned the film a score of 44 out of 100, based on 22 critics, indicating "mixed or average" reviews.
