= Picture Palace Films =

British production company based in London

Picture Palace Films is a British production company based in London and best known for its involvement in the Sharpe series. It was founded during the 1980s. Its productions in northern England are separately incorporated as Picture Palace North.

It has also been involved in Four Minutes and the film version of The Acid House. In 2010, Picture Palace announced that it was developing Flashman at the Charge for television, but it has not yet been produced.
