= Designated Survivor season 2 =

Designated Survivor
- Season 2
- Promotional poster
- Starring: Kiefer Sutherland; Natascha McElhone; Paulo Costanzo; Adan Canto; Italia Ricci; LaMonica Garrett; Zoe McLellan; Ben Lawson; Kal Penn; Maggie Q
- No. of episodes: 22

Release
- Original network: ABC
- Original release: September 27, 2017 – May 16, 2018

Season chronology
- ← Previous; Season 1 Next → Season 3

The second season of the American political drama series Designated Survivor was ordered on May 11, 2017. It premiered on September 27, 2017, and consisted of 22 episodes. The series is produced by ABC Studios and The Mark Gordon Company, and is filmed in Toronto and Cambridge, Ontario, Canada.

== Premise ==
Beginning one year into office, President Thomas Kirkman juggles searching for the mastermind behind the attack on the Capitol Building, dealing with the day-to-day situations that take place at home and abroad, and surviving attacks against his administration.

== Cast and characters ==
=== Main ===
- Kiefer Sutherland as President Thomas "Tom" Kirkman
- Natascha McElhone as First Lady Alexandra "Alex" Kirkman
- Paulo Costanzo as White House Political Director Lyor Boone
- Adan Canto as National Security Advisor Aaron Shore
- Italia Ricci as White House Chief of Staff Emily Rhodes
- LaMonica Garrett as United States Secret Service Special Agent, Mike Ritter; head of President Kirkman's Secret Service protection detail
- Zoe McLellan as White House Counsel Kendra Daynes
- Ben Lawson as Secret Intelligence Service (MI6) Intelligence Officer, Damian Rennett
- Kal Penn as White House Press Secretary Seth Wright
- Maggie Q as Federal Bureau of Investigation (FBI) Special Agent Hannah Wells

=== Recurring ===
- Terry Serpico as Patrick Lloyd, the man behind the Capitol attack
- Jake Epstein as Chuck Russink, an FBI tech expert and Wells' partner
- Tanner Buchanan as Leo Kirkman, the President's son
- Mckenna Grace as Penny Kirkman, the President's daughter
- Reed Diamond as FBI Director John Foerstel
- Geoff Pierson as Secretary of State and former President Cornelius Moss
- Mykelti Williamson as Vice Chairman Admiral Chernow
- Kim Raver as Andrea Frost, aerospace engineer, tech billionaire, friend of Kirkman's
- Breckin Meyer as Trey Kirkman, the President's brother
- Aunjanue Ellis as Mayor, later Vice President Ellenor Darby
- Bonnie Bedelia as Eva Booker
- Michael J. Fox as Ethan West
- Nora Zehetner as Valeria Poriskova, Russian intelligence agent
- Rochelle Aytes as Senator Cowling

=== Guest ===
- Tim Busfield as Dr. Adam Louden, the President's therapist
- Chris Butler as Dax Minter, electric car company executive and anti-government hacker

== Episodes ==
No. overall	No. in season	Title	Directed by	Written by	Original release date	US viewers (millions)
22	1	"One Year In"	Chris Grismer	Keith Eisner	September 27, 2017	5.50
Six months after Patrick Lloyd (Terry Serpico) went on the run, and with Aaron now back in the West Wing as National Security Advisor, Kirkman tries to prevent an international crisis when Ukrainian separatists hijack a Russian airplane with American citizens on board, including an old friend of Kirkman’s. Wells works with MI6 agent Damian Rennett (Ben Lawson) to find Lloyd, but he stays a step ahead of them. Seth considers taking a private sector gig working for car company executive Dax Minter, but ultimately chooses to stay. Emily’s friend Lyor Boone (Paulo Costanzo) considers joining the White House as Political Director, but rubs some of the senior staff the wrong way, although proves his skills and is hired by Kirkman. The senior staff keeps a visiting writer occupied before his audience with the President. Lloyd returns to Washington.
23	2	"Sting of the Tail"	Frederick E. O. Toye	Keith Eisner	October 4, 2017	4.80
Kirkman works with Wells and Rennett when Lloyd reemerges, breaks into the home of the First Lady’s mother Eva Booker (Bonnie Bedelia) and threatens to unleash sarin gas on the D.C. metropolitan area if his demand for a pardon is not met. As Seth struggles to finish Kirkman's speech for the Correspondents' Dinner, the Senate challenges the legality of taking military action against Lloyd, but the issue is resolved when the FBI takes charge of the operation, and Lloyd is killed in a drone strike after refusing to surrender. Impressed by the Senate’s lawyer Kendra Daynes (Zoe McLellan), Kirkman hires her as White House Counsel.
24	3	"Outbreak"	Chris Grismer	Ashley Gable	October 11, 2017	4.61
Kirkman works with the Centers for Disease Control to contain a viral outbreak, sending his old colleague Tammy to coordinate the fight. She suggests using a newly developed medication to treat those who are infected, but the CEO of the company who created it prioritizes profits over lives. Meanwhile, Kendra attempts to settle a debate about a Confederate statue and Lyor & Seth prepare for the presentation of an Amazonian frog named after the President. Wells and Rennett dig deeper into Patrick Lloyd's motives, discovering a document trail that points towards a possible bribe Eva may have taken 30 years ago from a defense contractor Icarus Astrotech. After Damian is deported for breaking into a warehouse while searching for medical records, Wells and Chuck pay a visit to the man who allegedly bribed Eva, Eric Little, only to find him murdered.
25	4	"Equilibrium"	Joe Lazarov	Paul Redford & Keith Eisner	October 18, 2017	4.34
After a fatal incident at the U.S.-Mexico border inflames tensions in the middle of stalled trade negotiations, Kirkman and his senior staff work to mitigate the damage. Aaron’s cousin Nadia, now working for Senator Flores, meets with Aaron on the Senator’s behalf to discuss the deal, prompting Aaron to accuse the Senator of trying to exploit their relationship. After calling in a favor from his friend Dax Minter, Kirkman is able to close the deal. On Foerstel’s advice, Wells consults with Kendra about the alleged bribe committed by Eva. The two speak to Alex about the subject, but she is offended by the insinuation that her mother broke the law, only to be shocked when Eva privately admits to taking the bribe in exchange for Alex’s late father receiving a life-saving heart transplant. When Foerstel learns that Eric Little signed a multi-billion dollar contract with the Pentagon on Icarus’ behalf just after Lloyd hacked them 6 months ago, he files for a subpoena to question Eva. Meanwhile, an investigator from the Office of Management and Budget tries to determine who is responsible for breaking a priceless vase.
26	5	"Suckers"	Fred Gerber	Bill Chais	October 25, 2017	3.94
Kirkman lobbies for a bill to help victims of a massive financial scam, but is forced to regain the public's trust after Senator Rouse takes a private conversation out of context on national television to make Kirkman look like an elitist. Lyor pushes Kirkman to use a damaging piece of opposition research to damage Rouse’s reputation, but Kirkman manages to regain the public’s confidence without resorting to it. When a visiting British MP Charlotte Thorne is gunned down, Damian returns to work with Wells to investigate the murder, and the two identify an arms trafficker as a suspect and arrest him. Believing the case solved, they share an intimate moment, but later learn that not only is the trafficker innocent of Thorne’s murder, but that his wife has been using him as a flunky to smuggle weapons herself. Alex, reluctant to trust Kendra with the investigation into her mother, becomes emotionally involved in the proceedings, but Kendra manages to quash the subpoena issued to Eva.
27	6	"Two Ships"	Leslie Libman	Jessica Grasl	November 1, 2017	3.92
Kirkman sets out to prevent a potential national security threat after a US Navy ship with state-of-the-art weapons and surveillance systems collides with a civilian barge in hostile waters. With the senior command killed in the collision, Kirkman promotes lieutenant Will Griffin to the rank of captain and negotiates a deal with the Kunami government to rescue the crew in exchange for Kunami taking ownership of the vessel, but Captain Griffin refuses to abandon ship and sacrifices his life to scuttle the ship. Wells and Damian continue investigating Charlotte Thorne's death and rescue Thorne’s aide after she is abducted, but are surprised to learn that Cornelius Moss, former President and current Secretary of State, visited Thorne hours before her death. Kendra discovers that Eva had a brief meeting with Eric Little shortly before his death, contradicting a statement Alex made in court and creating the appearance of obstruction of justice. Emily reunites with her absentee father, but the outcome leaves her saddened, and when Seth comforts her, the two share a kiss.
28	7	"Family Ties"	Milan Cheylov	Pierluigi Cothran	November 15, 2017	4.05
Turkish President Turan visits DC for a NATO summit to renegotiate leases for U.S. Air Force bases in Turkey and attempts to leverage Kirkman into extraditing his biggest political opponent. Leo makes headlines after a scuffle with a Turkish protestor goes viral, but the incident is revealed to have been staged by Turan to put pressure on Kirkman, who forces Turan to stand down by threatening to give a platform to his rival. Eva agrees to be questioned by Foerstel to put an end to the investigation, but the interview leads to a subpoena being issued to Alex after Foerstel finds an offshore bank account set up in her name by Eric Little prior to his death. Secretary Moss stonewalls Wells and Damian as they investigate his relationship with Charlotte Thorne, but the two eventually discover that her aide killed her and Moss is cleared.
29	8	"Home"	Ian Toynton	Pat Cunnane	November 29, 2017	4.03
Kirkman, Aaron, and Wells embark on a secret trip to Afghanistan to speak with two warlords in order to determine which one can be made an ally to stabilize the nation and which one is planning to attack the mainland US. When a CIA safe house is attacked, Wells and Secret Service Agent Mike Ritter work together to rescue the station chief. Back at home, Lyor has to fix a technicality on his taxes to avoid a 6-figure fine. Seth is arrested after an officer discovers a stash of pills in his car, but refuses to admit that they belonged to his brother in order to keep his brother from being denied college admission. Kendra gets the case dismissed and out of the headlines, but Emily is torn on whether or not to tell the President.
30	9	"Three-Letter Day"	Jeannot Szwarc	Bill Chais & Ashley Arena	December 6, 2017	3.87
Kirkman's senior staff personally respond to letters sent to the White House. Aaron and Emily investigate a war hero's legacy, discovering that his commanding officer lied about the circumstances of his death out of spite due to an affair with his wife. Seth and Lyor look into a bee colony's collapse, initially suspecting an FAA radar installation but ultimately finding that the man’s wife killed the bees. Kendra and Wells look into the case of a man due to be executed for killing a DEA agent, learning that the man took the fall to save the actual culprit, his own son. Wells and Damian continue to search for evidence that could exonerate Alex, but their efforts to find a key witness are thrown into question after Chuck makes an alarming discovery.
31	10	"Line of Fire"	Chris Grismer	Keith Eisner	December 13, 2017	4.38
Kirkman is pulled into a difficult situation when a group of religious extremists threaten to allow themselves to burn to death in a forest fire if their parishioner’s daughter is made to undergo a treatment that defies scripture against the mother’s objections. Kirkman’s efforts to challenge their sanity and bring in a medical specialist fail to resolve the situation, but Emily convinces the mother to allow the recommended treatment. Aaron and Wells uncover evidence that Damian has been turned by the Russians, precipitating a confrontation in which Wells shoots Damian and he falls off a bridge. Alex convinces Director Foerstel to drop his investigation into her, but is killed in an unexpected accident.
32	11	"Grief"	Timothy Busfield	Keith Eisner	February 28, 2018	3.72
Ten weeks after Alex's death, Kirkman is still coming to terms with his grief during sessions with his therapist Dr. Louden (who is portrayed by Director Timothy Busfield). Aaron and Wells join a delegation visiting Cuba to potentially open the nation for American businesses, but the delegation is taken hostage by rebels. Wells’ escape attempt fails, but she discovers that a businessman on the delegation is in league with the rebel group; when she signals this during a video call, Chuck uncovers evidence that both the businessman and the rebel leader conspired with the Cuban President to orchestrate the crisis, and the delegation is rescued. Meanwhile, Emily and Seth discuss their relationship status, Lyor hires an assistant staffer, and Kirkman finally confronts the imprisoned driver who killed his wife. Damian returns, having survived being shot by Wells.
33	12	"The Final Frontier"	Sharat Raju	Jeff Melvoin	March 7, 2018	3.60
Arrested by Wells and brought in for questioning, Damian claims to have key information that may help Kirkman save a stranded space station crew from dehydration, including that both the U.S. and Russian space programs were hit by a cyberattack. When a jammed part threatens the crew, Kirkman works with Dr. Andrea Frost (Kim Raver), the CEO of a former government contractor, to solve the problem and keep the crew alive. Wells reluctantly works with Damian to find the hacker, and although they can’t identify the hacker, they are able to reverse the hack and save the crew. However, in the process, Secretary Moss makes an unapproved concession to the Russians, and Kirkman fires him. While Kirkman tries to keep his children steady in the wake of Alex's death, a security video of Kirkman’s visit to the prisoner who killed his wife is leaked online.
34	13	"Original Sin"	Bosede Williams	Ashley Gable	March 14, 2018	3.69
The White House staff has its hands full dealing with the fallout from the video leak of Kirkman's contentious visit with Alex's killer, finding who was responsible for the leak, and combating a false perception of Kirkman as a tyrant because of it. Adding fuel to the fire is an unexpected sit-in from a visiting tribe of Native Americans whose lands were compromised by decades-old developments by Kirkman's former architectural firm, but all from a time Kirkman himself was unaware of the tribe or its heritage. Coinciding with a meeting for a charitable foundation in Alex’s memory, Kirkman's younger brother Trey (Breckin Meyer) comes to heal their relationship; Kirkman initially rebuffs him, but reconciles after a conversation with Leo. Meanwhile, Wells receives intel that Damian has been targeted for assassination, using him as bait to catch the would-be killer, but the assassin’s laptop is destroyed after the battery is remotely overheated.
35	14	"In the Dark"	Carol Banker	Bill Chais	March 21, 2018	3.98
A power blackout in Washington scrambles both the White House staff and Wells into tracking the source of an apparent hack into the grid. Emily and Lyor attempt to negotiate an extension for a bond payment to Japan, but are trapped alone in an elevator when the blackout hits. Damian breaks his tracking device to kill a mercenary before they can kill Wells at the behest of Damian’s former handler Valeria. Kirkman and D.C.'s mayor Ellenor Darby tackle local unrest during the power failure and their success after an early misunderstanding prompts Kirkman to nominate her for Vice President. Trey moves to DC to stay with Kirkman and convinces the Japanese finance minister to grant the bond extension.
36	15	"Summit"	Chris Grismer	Jessica Grasl	March 28, 2018	3.80
With Darby confirmed as the new vice president, tensions including a ballistic missile test force Kirkman to speed up a peace summit between the Asian countries of East Hun Chiu and West Hun Chiu at Camp David, but continuing leaks threaten to torpedo the talks, especially when the son of one of the leaders defects to the US. Emily and Seth are compelled to sign White House disclosure documents covering it, but Emily’s reaction to the situation prompts Seth to break up with her. Kirkman brings in Frost and Moss to get the negotiations across the finish line, only to react furiously when Chuck, acting at Emily’s direction, discovers that Moss is the leaker. Aaron and Wells inform the President of a startling intel report indicating that a dirty bomb has been smuggled into the country.
37	16	"Fallout"	Joe Lazarov	Tom Garrigus	April 4, 2018	3.84
Kirkman and the FBI scramble to find where a "dirty" nuclear waste bomb is planted in the United States and the person responsible for it. With help from Frost, a bomb is found at a Metro Line train station, but Wells finds the bomber and discovers it to be a decoy; when she calls Director Foerstel to inform him, he races to clear the station, but the real dirty bomb explodes and kills six FBI personnel, including Foerstel. Evidence initially points to East Hun Chiu, but further investigation identifies Kunami as the responsible party. Despite advice to inform Congress and his allies, Kirkman refuses to wait and orders missile strikes at strategic targets in Kunami.
38	17	"Overkill"	Jeff T. Thomas	Jeff Melvoin & Tracey Rice	April 11, 2018	3.29
Kirkman presses forward with more attacks on Kunami's military infrastructure to bring the rogue country's strongman emir to heel in the wake of the dirty bombing, but privately wrestles with his conscience over the war. Aaron and Lyor lock horns over the best course of action while Mike lends a hand to a junior staffer. Hannah, on the ground in Kunami with Seal Team 3, discovers Kunami's ambassador orchestrated the bombing to implicate the emir, and the ambassador is arrested. Dr. Louden’s computer is hacked and his notes about his sessions with the President are leaked online, suggesting the hacker is someone close to Kirkman.
39	18	"Kirkman Agonistes"	Leslie Libman	Pierluigi D. Cothran & Patrick Cunnane	April 18, 2018	3.51
When the private tape recordings of Kirkman's therapy sessions are leaked to the press, Vice President Darby convenes a secret Cabinet meeting to discuss whether to remove Kirkman under the 25th Amendment and ruthless attorney Ethan West (Michael J. Fox) is brought in to investigate Kirkman's fitness for office. A weary Kirkman ponders briefly whether he really feels fit to remain in office. Seth dresses down the White House press corps for their coverage of the President’s mental state. Aaron, Wells, and Damian identify a suspect in their hacking case, but Wells is horrified when Damian is shot in front of her only minutes after they learn the suspect’s name.
40	19	"Capacity"	David Warry-Smith	Keith Eisner	April 25, 2018	3.36
Kirkman and his inner circle testify before Ethan West's hearing in order to prove the President's capability to stay in office. Despite damaging testimony from Dr. Louden, Aaron, Emily, Frost, Moss, and Trey, Kirkman convinces his cabinet that he is fit to remain in office. Kirkman also negotiates with Senate leadership over a budget bill with a deadline of midnight to avoid a government shutdown. Grief-stricken over Damian’s death and convinced that Frost is the hacker, Wells searches for a link between her and the cyberattacks, bringing her into career-threatening disfavor with the President. Unable to convince Aaron or Kirkman, Wells ultimately accosts Frost in public, and Kirkman fires her for insubordination.
41	20	"Bad Reception"	Chris Grismer	Tom Garrigus & Jessica Grasl	May 2, 2018	3.47
Kirkman negotiates with the fictional nation of Bultan to release an American student, threatened with hard labor for a minor crime, but the situation is complicated when the Bultani ambassador dies during a party at the White House and the prime minister demands unilateral oil exploration rights in a jointly-governed territory. Mike and Chuck investigate, and find out that the ambassafor was poisoned by a man who was in a legal dispute over Dhawan's lavish property. Ethan West, motivated by guilt over a failure to protect the boy’s aunt when she died years prior, involves himself in the case, initially getting in the way but eventually working with Kirkman to bring the boy home. Kendra's former mentor is considered for an appellate court nomination, but a prior lawsuit against him throws his nomination into question. Frost, about to leave for San Francisco to head a project crucial for her company, shares a private farewell with Kirkman, each urging the other not to reject future love despite their spousal bereavements. Dax Minter is exposed and arrested as the hacker, having obtained private information by bugging the Oval Office, and it is revealed that Wells' firing was staged for Minter to hear. After digging into Minter’s hard drive, Chuck and Wells learn that Valeria was the one who shot Damian in an attempt to kill Wells at Minter’s behest, and Wells resigns to hunt Valeria down personally.
42	21	"Target"	Timothy Busfield	Bill Chais & Ashley Gable	May 9, 2018	3.29
Senators Crowell and Feller use a key defense spending bill to try strong-arming the resolutely independent Kirkman to join the Democratic and Republican parties respectively to run for President. When former President Moss steps up his attacks on the administration, Kirkman appoints Ethan West as Special Counsel to investigate former his leaking of classified information. Moss announces that he is running for the Republican nomination for President. Meanwhile, Wells discovers a video Damian recorded before his death asking her to protect his daughter Amy in London and an old murder case threatens Kendra’s safety after she starts a relationship with Trey.
43	22	"Run"	Chris Grismer	Keith Eisner	May 16, 2018	3.54
Kirkman faces criminal accusations from the Attorney General, who seems to have the support of Senators Crowell and Feller. Concurrently, US protectorate Taurasi is slammed by an earthquake-caused tsunami just after voting for independence, and Seth goes missing during the chaos. When Congress refuses to provide aid for political reasons, Emily’s efforts to push the issue cause friction between Kirkman and the Supreme Court, and she decides to resign as Chief of Staff. Leo is accepted to both Georgetown and Stanford. Despite first seeming to side against the president, Ethan West comes to a surprising realization about Kirkman's character and style. After resolving Taurasi's humanitarian crisis, Kirkman announces that he is running for re-election as an Independent. Meanwhile, Wells protects Rennett's daughter Amy from an assassination attempt by Valeria, whom she shoots dead, avenging Damian. Because she has no family left, Amy asks Wells to take care of her. Wells reluctantly agrees and the two board a plane to fly to the US. On a USB drive that Valeria was carrying, Wells sees recorded video footage showing Emily passing an envelope to Valeria.

== Production ==
Designated Survivor was renewed for a second season on May 11, 2017. Former The Good Wife executive producer Keith Eisner will take over as showrunner for the second season. Eisner will be the fourth showrunner for the show, replacing Jeff Melvoin, who was hired as showrunner in December 2016, taking over for Jon Harmon Feldman. The show's original showrunner Amy B. Harris stepped down due to creative differences after the series' official pickup in February 2016.

On June 22, 2017, cast member Virginia Madsen announced that she would not be returning for the second season as Kimble Hookstraten as she commented "I guess they had other stories to tell. It's a big show so I wish them well." After the first-season finale, Sutherland announced that the show would add three new characters for the second season. Two of the character descriptions was "a "fiery" female White House Counsel and a "ruggedly handsome" MI6 operative who crosses paths with Hannah." TVLine announced on June 29, 2017, that Paulo Costanzo had been cast as a series regular role as Lyor Boone, the new White House Political Director. Deadline reported on July 17, 2017, that Ben Lawson had been cast as the series regular character Damian Rennett, an MI6 operative. In the same month, it was announced that Zoe McLellan was cast in a series regular role as attorney and White House counsel, Kendra Daynes. In November 2017, Kim Raver was cast in the recurring role of engineer and space entrepreneur, Andrea Frost. In January 2018, Michael J. Fox was cast in the recurring role of Washington attorney and special prosecutor, Ethan West. In March 2018, Nora Zehetner was cast in the recurring role of Russian cultural attaché, Valeria Poriskova.

== Ratings ==
Viewership and ratings per episode of Designated Survivor season 2
No.	Title	Air date	Rating/share (18–49)	Viewers (millions)	DVR (18–49)	DVR viewers (millions)	Total (18–49)	Total viewers (millions)
1	"One Year In"	September 27, 2017	1.1/4	5.50	1.4	5.84	2.5	11.34
2	"Sting of the Tail"	October 4, 2017	0.9/4	4.80	1.2	5.20	2.1	10.00
3	"Outbreak"	October 11, 2017	0.9/4	4.61	1.1	5.07	2.0	9.68
4	"Equilibrium"	October 18, 2017	0.8/3	4.34	1.1	5.00	1.9	9.34
5	"Suckers"	October 25, 2017	0.7/3	3.94	1.0	4.60	1.7	8.54
6	"Two Ships"	November 1, 2017	0.7/3	3.92	0.9	4.31	1.6	8.23
7	"Family Ties"	November 15, 2017	0.8/3	4.05	0.9	4.47	1.7	8.52
8	"Home"	November 29, 2017	0.7/3	4.03	1.0	4.83	1.7	8.86
9	"Three-Letter Day"	December 6, 2017	0.7/3	3.87	0.9	4.60	1.6	8.47
10	"Line of Fire"	December 13, 2017	0.8/3	4.38	—N/a	—N/a	—N/a	—N/a
11	"Grief"	February 28, 2018	0.6/2	3.72	1.0	4.71	1.6	8.43
12	"The Final Frontier"	March 7, 2018	0.6/2	3.60	0.9	4.41	1.5	8.02
13	"Original Sin"	March 14, 2018	0.7/3	3.69	0.8	4.20	1.5	7.89
14	"In the Dark"	March 21, 2018	0.7/3	3.98	0.8	4.10	1.5	8.08
15	"Summit"	March 28, 2018	0.7/3	3.80	0.7	3.99	1.4	7.79
16	"Fallout"	April 4, 2018	0.6/3	3.84	0.8	3.88	1.4	7.72
17	"Overkill"	April 11, 2018	0.6/3	3.29	0.7	4.11	1.3	7.39
18	"Kirkman Agonistes"	April 18, 2018	0.6/3	3.51	0.7	3.97	1.3	7.48
19	"Capacity"	April 25, 2018	0.5/2	3.36	0.7	3.71	1.2	7.07
20	"Bad Reception"	May 2, 2018	0.6/3	3.47	0.6	3.44	1.2	6.91
21	"Target"	May 9, 2018	0.5/2	3.29	0.7	3.62	1.2	6.90
22	"Run"	May 16, 2018	0.6/3	3.54	0.7	3.58	1.3	7.12
