= Designated Survivor season 3 =

Designated Survivor
- Season 3
- Promotional poster
- Starring: Kiefer Sutherland; Adan Canto; Italia Ricci; Kal Penn; Maggie Q
- No. of episodes: 10

Release
- Original network: Netflix
- Original release: June 7, 2019

Season chronology
- ← Previous; Season 2

The third and final season of the American political drama series Designated Survivor was ordered on September 5, 2018. Netflix reached a deal with Entertainment One to pick up the series after its cancellation from ABC. The third season, consisting of 10 episodes, premiered exclusively on Netflix on June 7, 2019.

== Premise ==
United States President Kirkman faces the political reality of campaigning as well as the tribulations of political advertising tactics used by the opposition. The season follows the President's fight to secure the interest of the public opinion and ultimately, the chances of his administration being elected for another term.

== Cast and characters ==
=== Main ===
- Kiefer Sutherland as President Thomas "Tom" Kirkman
- Adan Canto as National Security Advisor and later Vice President-elect Aaron Shore
- Italia Ricci as White House Special Advisor and campaign spokesperson Emily Rhodes
- Kal Penn as White House Press Secretary and White House Communications Director Seth Wright
- Maggie Q as Central Intelligence Agency (CIA) Case Officer Hannah Wells

=== Recurring ===
- Anthony Edwards as White House Chief of Staff Mars Harper
- Julie White as Kirkman's campaign manager Lorraine Zimmer
- Elena Tovar as White House Director of Social Innovation Isabel Pardo
- Lauren Holly as Lynn Harper Mars' wife
- Benjamin Charles Watson as White House Digital Officer Dontae Evans
- Jamie Clayton as Sasha Booker Kirkman's transgender sister in law
- Mckenna Grace as Penelope "Penny" Kirkman
- Chukwudi Iwuji as Dr. Eli Mays
- Geoff Pierson as Republican Presidential nominee Cornelius Moss
- Eltony Williams as Agent Troy Baye
- Jennifer Wigmore as CIA Deputy Director Dianne Lewis
- Wendy Lyon as Carrie Rhodes, Emily's mother

=== Guest ===
- Tim Busfield as Dr. Adam Louden
- Aunjanue Ellis as Vice President Ellenor Darby
- Jake Foy as Felix
- Rose Tuong as Kimiko
- Kent Sheridan as Senator Carlin
- Thomas Olajide as Mike Carter
- Aaron Ashmore as Phil Brunton
- James Cade as Myles Lee
- Percy Harris as Reggie Wood
- Karen Parker as Cheryl Jones
- Aniko Kaszas as Elizabeth Turner
- Erik Knudsen as Davis Marlowe
- Al Sapienza as General Nathan Kellogg

== Episodes ==
No. overall	No. in season	Title	Directed by	Written by	Original release date
44	1	"#thesystemisbroken"	Chris Grismer	Adam Stein	June 7, 2019
Kirkman has trouble with his campaign after an intense State of the Union Address, with little assistance other than his staff. He is running as an Independent which makes campaigning difficult. His Chief of Staff is the intimidating Mars Harper, whose wife has an opiate addiction. Emily has moved to Florida to care for her mother, but Seth invites her back. Vice President Ellenor Darby resigns to pursue the Democratic nomination for president. Cornelius Moss, the presumptive Republican nominee, has recruited Lorraine Zimmer as his campaign manager, but she leaves his to join Kirkman's. Seth meets Dontae Evans, a low level tech employee who sets up a website where Kirkman can listen to the people’s issues. Kirkman requests that Emily join his campaign and Mars hires Seth as the new White House Communication Director; Seth assigns Dontae to work for him. Hannah is recruited by the CIA.
45	2	"#slipperyslope"	Peter Leto	Dawn DeNoon	June 7, 2019
Upon learning that the child marriage rates are very high in the United States after having a meeting with Saudi Arabian leader Al-Mufti, Kirkman decides to propose a law banning the practice, but he postpones it when he learns how complicated the issue is. Meanwhile Mars checks his wife Lynn into rehab. Emily joins Kirkman’s campaign. Aaron, while struggling with being physically objectified in the media, is asked to be Kirkman’s choice for Vice President. Agent Wells, now with the CIA, joins forces with biologist Dr. Eli Mays to investigate a case of bioterrorism.
46	3	"#privacyplease"	Timothy Busfield	Peter Noah	June 7, 2019
It becomes public that Kirkman’s sister-in-law, Sasha, is transgender. After learning he has a daughter, Seth meets her. Aaron accepts Kirkman’s offer to be his VP candidate. Emily leaks that Moss may have Alzheimer’s. Mars’s marriage begins disintegrating even more and he is pulled between his wife and the woman with whom he is having an affair. Wells and Mays investigate the bioterrorism further, learning it has something to do with a spate of recent miscarriages. Penny has her first period, and Sasha helps her adjust. Kirkman gives a rousing speech to the nation—broadcast strictly on the Internet.
47	4	"#makehistory"	Chris Grismer	Ricardo Pérez González	June 7, 2019
Aaron’s vice presidential candidacy comes under fire from the press, which questions his Mexican descent. He also faces pressure at the White House, and ends up arguing with Isabel. Kirkman and his staff negotiate an appropriate solution to an ongoing nationwide teacher’s strike, and Kirkman makes a decision about vetoing a bill. Wells and Mays’s investigation gets closer to who caused the bio attack, when they discover it targets people of color, suggesting that it was likely racially motivated. During the course of Kirkman’s day, Dontae films most of his daily schedule to promote his campaign. The campaign video is successful, but a conspiracy website suggests Alex's death was a presidential murder.
48	5	"#nothingpersonal"	Peter Leto	Kendra Chanae Chapman	June 7, 2019
Seth lashes out at the White House press corps for bringing up conspiracy rumors regarding the death of Kirkman's wife. Kirkman and his staff prepare for the first presidential debate. Mars puts Isabel in charge of the case to pardon a Puerto Rican independence activist, which later becomes a stepping stone in Kirkman’s arguments for racial and educational equality during the debate. Wells and Mays’s investigation leads them to another bio lab, where they confront the scientist from Toronto. After killing him, they discover that he was a part of a neo-Nazi movement, and that the bio-weapon is capable of wiping out most of the world’s population.
49	6	"#whocares"	Chris Grismer	Drew Westcott	June 7, 2019
A Guatemalan child in a Texas hospital has Kirkman and his administration looking for a life-saving option. They are able to pay for the child’s kidney transplant, but despite the effort, Kirkman must deport the child and his family back to Guatemala. Dontae is mugged on his way to work, which leads Kirkman to propose a new urban development plan for stricken neighborhoods around the country. Wells and Mays’s investigation is put on hold by the FBI, until the bureau decides to raid a neo-Nazi compound, only to find every inhabitant there dead.
50	7	"#identity/crisis"	Sudz Sutherland	Adam Stein	June 7, 2019
A Russian bomber is jeopardizing American air space, and Kirkman and his staff work to divert it away from US airspace. While all of this is happening, an event from Aaron’s youth is brought up in the campaign and threatens his vice presidency. Mars goes after a drug company he knows is responsible for his wife's addiction to opioids, and is able to gather solid evidence of a conspiracy between the company and the FDA. Wells’s investigation leads to a brewery just outside Boston, which she discovers to be a facade for another bio-lab. She is poisoned by the chemicals there, and gets a look at the real mastermind behind the bio-attack before dying.
51	8	"#scaredshitless"	Sudz Sutherland	Kendra Chanae Chapman & Ricardo Pérez González	June 7, 2019
Following Wells’s death, President Kirkman launches a full manhunt for the bio-terrorist. Their first lead points the terrorist out in Mississippi, where he kills a friend of Dr. Mays. They also discover that he is planning to unleash the virus in water systems around the state. Mars’s opioid case makes it to media attention. The manhunt leads them to Houston, Texas, where the FBI corners the terrorist in a hotel before he commits suicide. Mays also reveals to the president that some sketches of how to make the virus were leaked online. He also gets a call from a colleague, who recognizes the man who visited his laboratory, hinting that Moss may have had some involvement in the bio-terrorism attack.
52	9	"#undecided"	Peter Leto	Dawn DeNoon	June 7, 2019
The suspicions of Moss’s possible involvement is brought up for Kirkman, but he advises the FBI to do what they feel is right despite the consequences it could have for his campaign. The bureau later arrest Moss’s political strategist for his involvement in the bio terrorism plot and later the FDA chief, after a visit by Mars. Emily, after weeks of urging, finally helps her cancer-stricken mother end her life by a fatal drug overdose. Mars also offers a surprised Isabel a promotion to deputy White House Chief of Staff if Kirkman wins the election. Following his campaign in Houston, Kirkman clashes with Moss over both of their capabilities. After overhearing Lorraine talking to Myles Lee about "Pegasus", Dontae gets Emily to check her computer for evidence of it. What she discovers is a recording that points towards Moss’s uninvolvement in the terrorism plot, in addition to a later leaked clip that shows Moss expressing worry over minority and majority changes in the US that could threaten his power-hand if he should win the election.
53	10	"#truthorconsequences"	Chris Grismer	Peter Noah	June 7, 2019
Kirkman talks to his psychologist about the prior 36 hours, where his conflicted decision is brought up, as to whether or not to leak the audio clip that reveals Moss's possible noninvolvement in the terrorism plot. He also brings up his hardening choices and opinions of his own mindset over the course of those hours. In the present, Kirkman's opinion polls are rising, Isabel tells Aaron the real reason they cannot be together again—and soon administers herself a home pregnancy test, and Mars tries to convince recovering Lynn she would be perfect to run for her father's old Senate seat. On Election Day, Kirkman is elected to a full term, and along with his supporters and his staff, he hosts a victory party. Both Myles Lee and Lorraine are arrested by the FBI for their double-crossing involvement in both the Kirkman and Moss campaigns. Despite giving a crowd-pleasing acceptance speech, Kirkman reflects later that he might not be up to the task.

== Production ==
=== Development ===
On May 11, 2018, ABC canceled the series after two seasons due to a high turnover of showrunners and declining ratings. Shortly after, eOne announced they were in "active discussions" with other networks to revive the show, including Netflix, which streams the series internationally. On September 5, 2018, it was confirmed that Netflix had picked up the series for a third season of 10 episodes, to be released in 2019. Neal Baer served as the series showrunner, the fifth person to do so. On April 24, 2019, it was announced that the third season would premiere on Netflix on June 7, 2019.

The first two seasons were produced by ABC Studios, The Mark Gordon Company, and eOne, with filming in Toronto, Ontario. For the third season, it was announced that ABC Studios would not be involved, with eOne (which had fully acquired the Mark Gordon Company) being the sole production company for the series.

=== Casting ===
After the third season renewal announcement, the producers confirmed that Kiefer Sutherland, Adan Canto, Italia Ricci, Kal Penn and Maggie Q would return as series regulars. On October 18, 2018, casting of Anthony Edwards, Julie White and Elena Tovar in the recurring roles of Mars Harper, Lorraine Zimmer and Isabel Pardo respectively were announced. On November 15, 2018, Lauren Holly and Benjamin Watson were cast in recurring roles as Lynn Harper and Dontae Evans, respectively.

=== Filming ===
Filming for the third season started in October 2018 and ended in February 2019.
