= The Acid House =

1994 book by Irvine Welsh

- First edition
- Author: Irvine Welsh
- Language: English, Scots
- Genre: Short stories
- Publisher: Jonathan Cape
- Publication date: 1994
- Publication place: Scotland
- Media type: Print
- Pages: 304 pp
- ISBN: 0-224-03685-8
- OCLC: 32467731

The Acid House is a 1994 book by Irvine Welsh, later made into a film of the same name. It is a collection of 22 short stories, with each story (between three and 20 pages) featuring a new set of characters and scenarios.

== Stories ==
- "The Shooter"
- "Eurotrash"
- "Stoke Newington Blues"
- "Vat '96"
- "A Soft Touch"
- "The Last Resort on the Adriatic"
- "Sexual Disaster Quartet"
- "Snuff"
- "A Blockage in the System"
- "Wayne Foster"
- "Where the Debris Meets the Sea"
- "Granny's Old Junk"
- "The House of John Deaf"
- "Across the Hall"
- "Lisa's Mum Meets the Queen Mum"
- "The Two Philosophers"
- "Disnae Matter"
- "The Granton Star Cause"
- "Snowman Building Parts for Rico the Squirrel"
- "Sport for All"
- "The Acid House"
- "A Smart Cunt (A Novella)"

== Film adaptation ==
The 1998 film, The Acid House, directed by Paul McGuigan, dramatizes 3 of the 22 stories from the book - "The Granton Star Cause", "A Soft Touch", and "The Acid House".
