= Designated Survivor (TV series) =

2016 American political thriller series

- Genre: Political thriller; Political drama; Conspiracy thriller
- Created by: David Guggenheim
- Starring: Kiefer Sutherland; Natascha McElhone; Adan Canto; Italia Ricci; Tanner Buchanan; LaMonica Garrett; Kal Penn; Maggie Q; Jake Epstein; Paulo Costanzo; Zoe McLellan; Ben Lawson
- Theme music composer: Sean Callery; Paul Leonard-Morgan
- Composers: Sean Callery; Robert Lydecker; Paul Leonard-Morgan
- Country of origin: United States
- Original language: English
- No. of seasons: 3
- No. of episodes: 53 (list of episodes)

Production
- Executive producers: Mark Gordon; Nicholas Pepper; Jeff Melvoin; Jon Harmon Feldman; Kiefer Sutherland; Suzan Bymel; Paul McGuigan; Amy Harris; Aditya Sood; David Guggenheim; Simon Kinberg; Neal Baer
- Producers: Richard Klein; Ann Kindberg; Tommy Burns
- Production locations: Hamilton, Ontario; Toronto, Ontario; Washington, D.C.
- Cinematography: M. David Mullen; David A. Harp
- Editor: Michael Schweitzer
- Camera setup: Single-camera
- Running time: 42 minutes (seasons 1–2); 46–53 minutes (season 3)
- Production companies: Kinberg Genre; The Mark Gordon Company; Baer Bones; ABC Studios (seasons 1–2)

Original release
- Network: ABC
- Release: September 21, 2016 – May 16, 2018
- Network: Netflix
- Release: June 7, 2019

Related
- Designated Survivor: 60 Days

Designated Survivor is an American political thriller drama television series created by David Guggenheim. The series aired for three seasons, beginning on ABC and then exclusively on Netflix for the third and final season. Kiefer Sutherland stars as Thomas Kirkman, an American academic named as the designated survivor for the State of the Union address, who suddenly ascends from the position of U.S. Secretary of Housing and Urban Development to President of the United States after an explosion kills everyone ahead of him in the presidential line of succession. Kirkman deals with his inexperience as head of state while looking to uncover the truth behind the attack.

The project skipped the pilot stage. It was ordered straight to series on December 14, 2015, with a formal announcement on May 6, 2016. The first episode premiered on September 21, 2016, to an audience of over 10 million viewers. Eight days later, a full-season order was announced. The series was renewed for a second season on May 11, 2017, which premiered on September 27, 2017. In May 2018, ABC cancelled the series after two seasons. In September 2018, Netflix and Entertainment One announced they had reached a deal to pick up Designated Survivor for a third season of 10 episodes, with the latter being solely responsible for the production of the series. The third season premiered on Netflix on June 7, 2019. In July 2019, the series was canceled by Netflix.

== Premise ==
On the night of the State of the Union, an explosion destroys the Capitol Building, killing the president and everyone in the line of succession except for Secretary of Housing and Urban Development Thomas Kirkman, who had been named the designated survivor.

== Episodes ==
Season	Episodes	Originally released		
Season	Episodes	First released	Last released	Network
1	21	September 21, 2016	May 17, 2017	ABC
2	22	September 27, 2017	May 16, 2018	ABC
3	10	June 7, 2019		Netflix

== Cast and characters ==
=== Main ===
Character	Portrayed by	Seasons		
Character	Portrayed by	1	2	3
Tom Kirkman	Kiefer Sutherland	Main	Main	Main
Alex Kirkman	Natascha McElhone	Main (Note: Natascha McElhone was credited as a series regular through season 2, episode 10. From season 2, episode 11 onward, she no longer appears.)	Main	
Aaron Shore	Adan Canto	Main	Main	Main
Emily Rhodes	Italia Ricci	Main	Main	Main
Mike Ritter	LaMonica Garrett	Main	Main	
Leo Kirkman	Tanner Buchanan	Main (Note: Buchanan is credited as a series regular until 1x13 and as a guest star from 1x14 onwards.)	Recurring	
Seth Wright	Kal Penn	Main	Main	Main
Hannah Wells	Maggie Q	Main	Main	Main
Chuck Russink	Jake Epstein	Main	Main	
Lyor Boone	Paulo Costanzo		Main	
Kendra Daynes	Zoe McLellan		Main	
Damian Rennett	Ben Lawson		Main	

- Kiefer Sutherland as Thomas Adam "Tom" Kirkman, the President of the United States, sworn in following an unprecedented attack on the Capitol Building which killed the entire government. He formerly held the office of Secretary of Housing and Urban Development. After successfully proving his competency as the head of government, Kirkman is elected for a second term at the end of the third season.
- Natascha McElhone as Alexandra Jane "Alex" Kirkman (seasons 1–2), the First Lady of the United States. Prior to becoming First Lady, Alex was an immigration attorney in private practice. In season two, Alex was killed after a truck crashed into the motorcade she was traveling in.
- Adan Canto as Aaron Shore (né Rivera), the Vice President-elect of the United States. Before being put on President Kirkman's ticket in his re-election campaign in the last season, Aaron worked as Kirkman's first Chief of Staff until resigning after being interrogated about the terrorist attack on the Capitol in the first season. During that time, he worked as a senior aide to the Speaker of the House Kimble Hookstraten, before returning to the White House as Kirkman's National Security Advisor.
- Italia Ricci as Emily Rhodes, the spokesperson of Kirkman's presidential campaign. Since his days as HUD Secretary, she has worked for Tom, where she was his chief of staff. After Kirkman became president, she was appointed Special Advisor, and, following Aaron's resignation, his Chief of Staff until resigning from the White House to live in Florida with her mother. She later returned and was reinstated as Special Advisor.
- Tanner Buchanan as Leo Kirkman (season 1; recurring season 2), Tom and Alex's son and Penny's older brother. Leo is tasked with supporting his sister Penny while his parents are busy in their new jobs. Later Leo leaves the White House for his freshman year at Stanford University.
- LaMonica Garrett as Mike Ritter (seasons 1–2), a Secret Service agent, assigned to President Kirkman's personal protection detail. Ritter was responsible for the safety of the entire Kirkman family following the Capitol attack. His character is written off the series without an explanation after season two.
- Kal Penn as Seth Wright, the White House Communications Director. He initially doubts Tom's abilities as President but quickly becomes one of his closest advisors. He was named Press Secretary due to his strong social skills. He was Press Secretary until his promotion to Communications Director in Season 3 by Chief of Staff Mars Harper.
- Maggie Q as Hannah Wells, a CIA Case Officer. Formerly an FBI Special Agent, she is assigned to investigate the Capitol attack, eventually solving the case and bringing those responsible to justice. In season three, after being fired from the Bureau, Hannah investigates a possible threat of bioterrorism for the CIA, ultimately leading to her death.
- Jake Epstein as Chuck Russink (seasons 1–2), an FBI analyst. Chuck regularly assists Wells in her investigations, becoming one of her most trusted allies.
- Paulo Costanzo as Lyor Boone (season 2), the White House Political Director. Lyor is a highly skilled, yet socially inept political consultant who is hired to help develop the political strategy of Kirkman's administration.
- Zoe McLellan as Kendra Daynes (season 2), a White House Counsel. Kendra is a no-nonsense attorney who previously served as counsel for the Senate Homeland Security sub-committee.
- Ben Lawson as Damian Rennett (season 2), an MI6 agent. He is assigned to assist Wells in finding the Capitol attack perpetrator. He is shot multiple times and killed by a Russian intelligence agent in a drive-by-shooting.

=== Recurring ===
- Mckenna Grace as Penny Kirkman, Tom and Alex’s daughter and Leo’s younger sister. (season 1–3)
- Peter Outerbridge as Charles Langdon, former Chief of Staff in the Richmond administration. Charles is one of the survivors of the Capitol attack who later provides Wells and the FBI with information about the conspiracy. (season 1)
- Malik Yoba as Jason Atwood, former Deputy Director of the FBI. Jason leads the FBI investigation into the Capitol attack alongside Wells, becoming one of Wells’ most trusted allies. Jason is eventually shot and killed by Nestor Lozano, who catches him spying on Jay Whitaker (see below), who is revealed to be conspiring with the perpetrator of the Capitol bombing. (season 1)
- Kevin McNally as Harris Cochrane, former Chairman of the Joint Chiefs of Staff. Harris initially refuses to accept Kirkman as the new commander-in-chief and attempts to have him removed from office. Kirkman fires him after he disobeys a direct order. (season 1)
- Virginia Madsen as Kimble Hookstraten, the Speaker of the House. Kimble is a Republican from Missouri, who is selected as the designated survivor for the party. She supports Kirkman’s authority while secretly harbouring her own agenda. Kimble later becomes the United States Secretary of Education after an investigation that forces her to resign from the United States House of Representatives. (season 1)
- Ashley Zukerman as Peter MacLeish, former Congressman from Oregon and later Vice President of the United States. Peter is initially established as the sole survivor of the Capitol bombing and hailed a national hero. MacLeish eventually becomes Vice President. After investigating him for months, Hannah Wells concludes that he was involved in the preparation of the Capitol attack, leading to MacLeish being shot and killed by his wife before taking her own life so that the FBI could not gather any more information on the conspiracy. (season 1)
- George Tchortov as Nestor Lozano, a former CIA agent. The FBI wants Lozano due to him being heavily involved in the Capitol attack conspiracy. He operates under the name "Catalan". At the end of Season One, he is killed by FBI Agent Hannah Wells. (season 1)
- Reed Diamond as John Foerstel, former Director of the FBI. Foerstel occasionally assists Wells with her investigations into the Capitol attack while continuously establishing that he is in charge, not her. In season two, Foerstel is killed in a subway station bombing after running inside to alert his agents and evacuate them. (season 1–2)
- Mykelti Williamson as Admiral Chernow, the Chairman of the Joint Chiefs of Staff. Chernow becomes one of Kirkman’s most trusted advisors after succeeding Cochrane as Chairman after he is fired for disobedience. (season 1–2)
- Michael Gaston as James Royce, former Governor of Michigan. Royce openly and repeatedly defies the Kirkman administration while trying to establish his own supreme authority. After Royce begins to violently detain protestors for going against his own beliefs, he is arrested for committing treason against the United States.(season 1)
- Mariana Klaveno as Brooke Mathison, a self-claimed contractor. Brooke abducts Luke, Atwood’s son, and blackmails Jason into falsely confessing to the murder of Majid Nassar in exchange for his safety. She fails to hold up her end of the deal, and Luke is later found dead on a riverbank. Atwood later kills her after she pulls out a gun to kill either Hannah Wells or Atwood. (season 1)
- Lara Jean Chorostecki as Beth MacLeish, the wife of Peter MacLeish. Beth, alongside her husband, is a part of the Capitol attack conspiracy. She goads Peter into following through with their premeditated agenda. Whenever her husband feels upset, she always tells him that they'll be okay and that nothing bad will happen to them. She eventually shoots and kills Peter before committing suicide after learning that Wells had uncovered their plan and involvement. (season 1)
- Rob Morrow as Abe Leonard, a newspaper journalist. Abe is an old friend of Kimble Hookstraten who harbors some hatred toward Seth. He is determined to find something to incriminate the Kirkman family. (season 1)
- Geoff Pierson as Cornelius Moss, former 44th President of the United States. He decided not to seek re-election due to the death of his wife and comes out of retirement to give President Kirkman a list of candidates for the empty Cabinet positions. President Kirkman brings Moss back into the spotlight, appointing him to be his Secretary of State. Moss is later removed from this position after working covertly in opposition to Kirkman. He develops a hatred for Kirkman and becomes the Republican nominee for President in the third season. (season 1–3)
- Mark Deklin as Jack Bowman, a Republican senator from Montana. Senator Bowman is one of President Kirkman's most reviled members of Congress. Bowman seeks to raise his profile by continuously opposing Kirkman’s legislative agenda, especially his stance on gun control. (season 1)
- Kearran Giovanni as Diane Hunter, a Democratic senator from Massachusetts. She is also the Senate Minority Leader, who has a habit of sparring with Bowman. (season 1)
- Terry Serpico as Patrick Lloyd, former CEO of Browning Reed. Lloyd is the founder and leader of True Believers, the organization responsible for the Capitol attack. Wells uncovers Lloyd as the mastermind behind the attack, subsequently leading to Kirkman ordering a drone strike on his bunker, killing him because of the threat of him carrying sarin gas that can kill thousands. (season 1–2)
- Richard Waugh as Jay Whitaker, former Homeland Security Advisor. While working at the White House, Whitaker hacks into the computers and downloads a file containing a false confession to the bombing of the Capitol by Majid Nassar, also deleting files that could compromise his secret. Whitaker is the person responsible for Kirkman becoming a designated survivor. After receiving images and an audio file sent by Atwood before his death, Hannah discovers Whitaker’s secrets, leading to his arrest in the West Wing. He was considered the traitor in the White House for a large portion of Season 1. (season 1)
- Breckin Meyer as Trey Kirkman, Tom’s estranged younger brother. Trey is a financial expert, and after reconciling their relationship, he becomes a confidant and advisor to the President. (season 2)
- Kim Raver as Andrea Frost, the CEO of Apache Aerospace. Andrea is an aerospace engineer and a colleague of Kirkman. She becomes Wells’ prime suspect in her investigation into Gamine’s identity. President Kirkman and Agent Wells eventually find that she is not the perpetrator. Since most of her time on the show was after the death of First Lady Alexandra Kirkman, there were rumors that Kirkman would develop a romantic relationship with Dr. Frost. (season 2)
- Michael J. Fox as Ethan West, an attorney. Ethan is hired by Kirkman’s administration to oversee an inquiry investigating Kirkman’s fitness to serve as president. (season 2)
- Nora Zehetner as Valeria Poriskova, a Russian intelligence agent. Valeria is assigned to become an undercover Russian Embassy cultural attaché; she is Damian Rennett’s handler. In season two, Valeria attempts to kill Hannah in a drive-by-shooting instead of Rennett, who shielded Wells. She is later killed in the United Kingdom after being shot by Hannah. (season 2)
- Aunjanue Ellis as Ellenor Darby, former Vice President of the United States. Ellenor previously served as the Mayor of Washington D.C. until being nominated by Kirkman as the next Vice President, following their successful collaboration and response to the power failure caused by a cyberattack. Vice President Darby leads an investigation with the Cabinet into President Kirkman's mental health after the death of his wife, Alex. After the investigation, Darby resigns intending to seek the Democratic presidential nomination, which proves unsuccessful. (season 2–3)
- Anthony Edwards as Mars Harper, the White House Chief of Staff. Mars is appointed after Emily’s resignation. He is known for his strict policies with the White House staff, including his rule about standing in meetings. He spends much of his time dealing with his wife Lynn's opiate addiction problem. (season 3)
- Julie White as Lorraine Zimmer, the campaign manager for Kirkman’s presidential campaign. She has a raunchy, no-nonsense attitude that is contrary to President Kirkman. (season 3)
- Elena Tovar as Isabel Pardo, the White House Deputy Chief of Staff. Before being promoted, Isabel held White House Director of Social Innovation. She is Aaron Shore's girlfriend for a lot of Season 3 but breaks up with him after she finds out Shore slept with Emily Rhodes during Shore and Pardo's relationship. (season 3)
- Lauren Holly as Lynn Harper, the daughter of a renowned Virginia senator and the wife of Mars Harper. She is known for her addiction to opiates that lands her in rehabilitation thrice. (season 3)
- Ben Watson as Dontae Evans, the White House Digital Officer. He had previously worked in the White House as a digital team member but was promoted by Seth Wright. He identifies as gay and strikes a relationship with Aaron Shore's personal detail, Troy. (season 3)
- Chukwudi Iwuji as Dr. Eli Mays, a DIY biohacker and geneticist. He works closely with Hannah to thwart an expected bioterrorist attack before she is killed. (season 3)
- Jamie Clayton as Sasha Booker, Alex’s sister and Tom's sister-in-law. She lived in Paris, France for most of Kirkman's presidency but moves back to the United States when Kirkman comes under fire for hiding Sasha (who is trans) for most of his presidency. She does not like the spotlight, but as Kirkman's presidential campaign goes on, she becomes more used to it after a push from Seth Wright and Dontae Evans. (season 3)
- Jennifer Wigmore as Dianne Lewis is the deputy director of the CIA. Lewis was originally a CIA analyst and worked her way up through the ranks. She is responsible for re-recruiting Hannah Wells to the CIA after she was fired from the FBI. President Kirkman has her transferred to the White House during the bioterror threat so she could advise him and help prevent the attack. (season 3)
- Nick Boraine as Dr. Wouter Momberg was a South African scientist who worked to develop racially-targeted bioweapons. (season 3)
- Eltony Williams as Agent Troy Baye, He is Aaron's new security agent and Dontae's boyfriend. (season 3)
- Wendy Lyon as Carrie Rhodes, Emily's mother, who suffered ovarian cancer. (season 3)

== Production ==
=== Development ===
Designated Survivor was ordered straight to series by ABC in December 2015, with a formal announcement of 13 episodes in May 2016. A month later, ABC revealed that the series would premiere on September 21, 2016. Eight days after the premiere, on September 29, 2016, ABC gave the series a full season order.

Created by David Guggenheim, the series is executive produced by Simon Kinberg, Sutherland, Suzan Bymel, Aditya Sood, and Nick Pepper. Paul McGuigan directed the pilot episode. Amy B. Harris was set to be the showrunner in February 2016, but after the series' official pick-up in May, it was announced she would be stepping down due to creative differences, and that Jon Harmon Feldman was in talks to replace her. In July 2016, Feldman was confirmed as showrunner/executive producer. In December 2016, Jeff Melvoin was hired as showrunner, replacing the departing Feldman, and supervised the second half of the season. The series was renewed for a second season on May 11, 2017, which premiered on September 27, 2017. For the second season, writer Keith Eisner serves as the showrunner. Kal Penn, who served as the associate director of the White House Office of Public Engagement and Intergovernmental Affairs from 2009 to 2011, works as a consultant for the series in addition to his portraying Seth Wright.

On May 11, 2018, ABC canceled the series after two seasons due to a high turnover of showrunners and declining ratings. Shortly after, eOne announced they were in "active discussions" with other networks to revive the show, including Netflix, which streams the series internationally. On September 5, 2018, it was confirmed that Netflix had picked up the series for a third season of 10 episodes, which was released in 2019. Neal Baer served as the series showrunner, the fifth person to do so. On April 24, 2019, it was announced that the third season was set to premiere on Netflix on June 7, 2019.

The first two seasons were produced by ABC Studios, The Mark Gordon Company, and eOne, with filming in Toronto, Ontario. For the third season, ABC Studios was not involved, with eOne (which had fully acquired the Mark Gordon Company) being the sole production company for the series.

On July 24, 2019, Netflix announced the series would not be renewed a fourth season, stating that the third season made for a satisfying final season. However, Netflix will continue to stream all three seasons on their platform.

=== Writing ===
Producers Jon Harmon Feldman and Guggenheim described the series as more than one genre, drawing inspiration from other thriller-dramas, with Guggenheim explaining, "There is a West Wing component of a man governing and his team governing our nation at this critical time. It's also the Homeland aspect of investigating the conspiracy. It also has a House of Cards component, which is the characters and the business of government through the eyes of these characters."

=== Casting ===
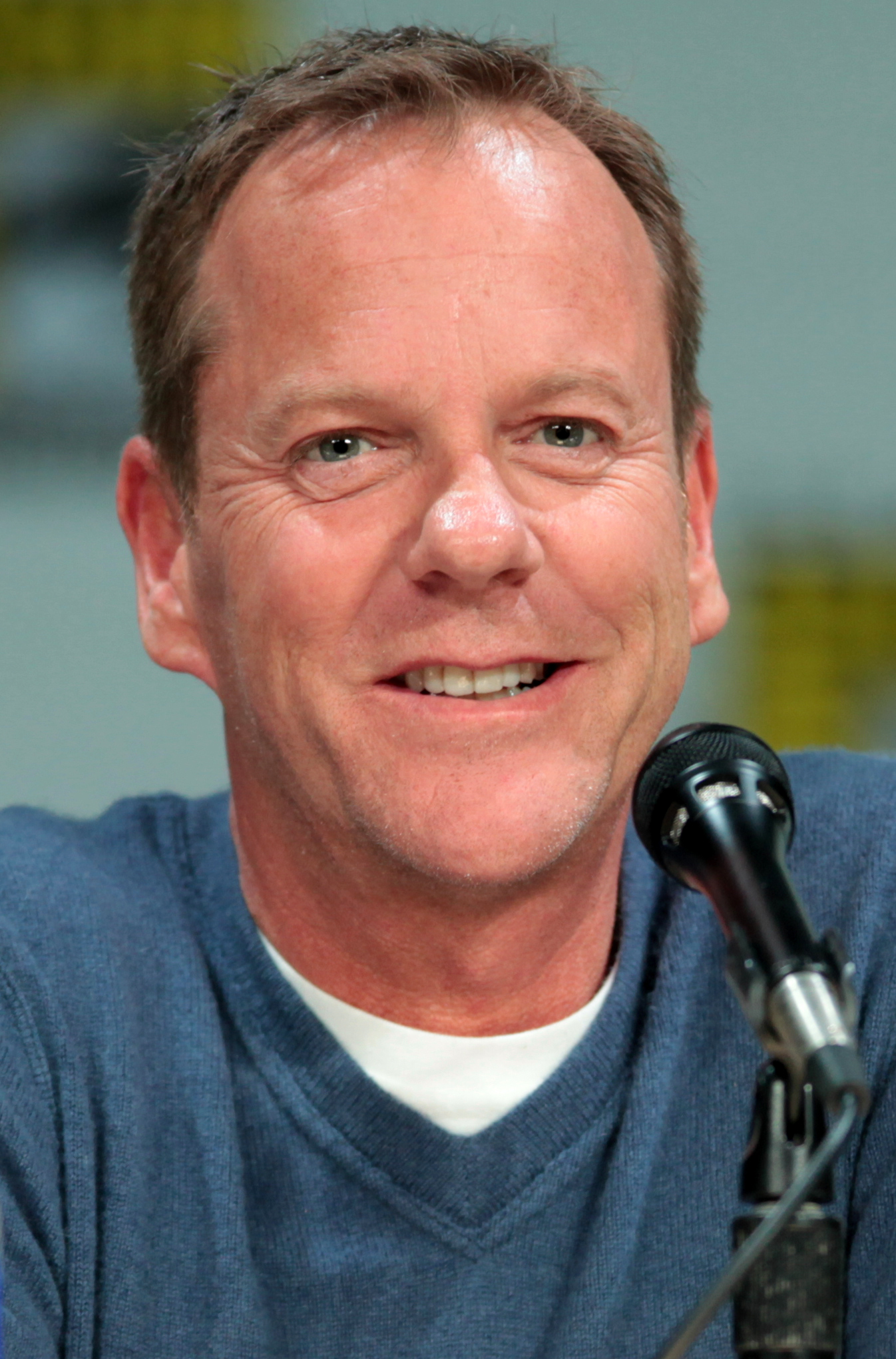
Kiefer Sutherland plays the lead role, Tom Kirkman

Kiefer Sutherland joined the cast in December 2015, playing Tom Kirkman, the United States Secretary of Housing and Urban Development who suddenly becomes President of the United States. Sutherland had no intention of returning to television; he read the first script of the series and changed his mind, saying, "I remember getting to the end of the script and thinking I was potentially holding the next 10 years of my life in my hands."

In February 2016, it was announced that Kal Penn had been cast as Kirkman's speech writer, Maggie Q as Hannah, the lead FBI agent on the bombing of the U.S. Capitol, Natascha McElhone as Kirkman's wife, an EEOC attorney, as well as Italia Ricci as Emily, Kirkman's chief of staff. Shortly after, Adan Canto had joined the series as Aaron Shore, the White House Deputy Chief of Staff. In early March, LaMonica Garrett joined the cast as Mike Ritter, Kirkman's Secret Service agent, and Tanner Buchanan and Mckenna Grace had been cast as Kirkman's children.

In July 2016, Malik Yoba was announced for a recurring role as Jason Atwood, the seasoned Deputy Director of the FBI, to appear in seven episodes, while Virginia Madsen had been cast in the recurring role of Kimble Hookstraten, a conservative Congresswoman and the designated survivor for the rival political party. A month later, Ashley Zukerman joined the series in a recurring role as Peter MacLeish, an Afghan War veteran and popular third-term Congressman. In September 2016, Mykelti Williamson was cast as Admiral Chernow, a career military man and the Chairman of the Joint Chiefs of Staff. On November 4, 2016, it was announced that Mariana Klaveno had been cast for the show as the Dark-Haired Woman, a clandestine operator in league with the people behind the Capitol attack.

For the second season, Paulo Costanzo, Zoe McLellan, and Ben Lawson joined the cast as series regulars, portraying White House Political Director Lyor Boone, White House Counsel Kendra Daynes, and Damian Rennett, respectively.

After the third season renewal announcement, it was confirmed that Kiefer Sutherland, Adan Canto, Italia Ricci, Kal Penn and Maggie Q would return as series regulars. On October 18, 2018, it was reported that Anthony Edwards, Julie White and Elena Tovar were cast in the recurring roles of Mars Harper, Lorraine Zimmer and Isabel Pardo, respectively. On November 15, 2018, Lauren Holly and Benjamin Watson were cast in recurring roles as Lynn Harper and Dontae Evans, respectively.

== Release ==
=== Broadcast ===
Designated Survivor began airing on September 21, 2016, on ABC in the United States, and CTV in Canada. Netflix aired the series outside the United States and Canada, adding the episodes weekly, with distribution handled by eOne. For the third season, Designated Survivor was released globally on Netflix. Before Netflix announced it would release the third season, an agreement had to be reached with Hulu, who held the streaming rights to the first two seasons in the United States; the first two seasons moved to Netflix in the United States and Canada during October 2018.

ABC aired the series with a TV-14 rating (some episodes were TV-PG), while Netflix applied a TV-MA rating on the show's third and final season.

=== Marketing ===
A teaser trailer for Designated Survivor was released on May 6, 2016, with the full trailer released on May 17. Producers and some of the cast members promoted the series at San Diego Comic-Con in July 2016, showing a special preview screening with co-stars Maggie Q and Kal Penn in attendance.

=== Home media ===
The first season was released on DVD in Region 1 on August 29, 2017. The complete series featuring all three seasons was released on DVD in Region 1 on October 12, 2021.

== Reception ==
=== Critical reception ===
Review aggregator website Rotten Tomatoes gave Season 1 of the series an approval rating of 87% based on 62 reviews, with an average rating of 7.07/10. The site's critical consensus reads, "Kiefer Sutherland skillfully delivers the drama in Designated Survivor, a fast-paced, quickly engrossing escapist political action fantasy." Metacritic reported a score of 71 out of 100 based on 35 reviews, indicating "generally favorable reviews".

Terri Schwartz from IGN gave the first episode a rating of 8.0/10, saying, "Designated Survivor is a strong debut for a show that will fit well alongside Quantico and Scandal in ABC's government-set political drama lineup." Variety said that the episode "does everything it needs to, checking off the necessary boxes for the unwilling American hero-president in efficient, compelling scenes." Chuck Barney from Mercury News called the first episode "suspenseful". Writing for TV Insider, Matt Roush compared Designated Survivor with other series as he said "fall's niftiest new drama has West Wing idealism, Homeland suspense and House of Cards political intrigue in its robust and compelling DNA." Zack Handlen from The A.V. Club wrote positively about the show and the premiere, praising Sutherland's performance and commented on the symbol of Sutherland's glasses as he said, "The glasses he's wearing serve as a way to tell us this is a different kind of hero, but they're also a form of camouflage, making it easier for us to understand why so many people would underestimate this man."

The editors of TV Guide placed Designated Survivor first among the top ten picks for the most anticipated new shows of the 2016–17 season. In writer Alexander Zalben's overall review, he pointed out the keys to one of the strongest pilots he had seen so far: "Designated Survivor is the rare show that delivers on the hype, and surpasses it," and later stating "It's shocking that a show can balance all of these elements, but credit a magnetic cast that hits the ground running, a crack script that makes the first hour feel like 10 minutes and, of course, Sutherland as the anchor that keeps it all grounded." Zalben's review concluded with this recommendation: "There's a reason Designated Survivor wasn't just the top pick across all of our Editors' lists, but also on the list compiled from TVGuide.com viewers' Watchlist adds: this is a show that delivers on its premise, feels timely, and most importantly, is a ton of fun."

After watching the first episode of the first season, The Guardian's Brian Moylan criticized the dialogue, writing in his review that "this drama needs dialogue that won't make the citizenry's eyeballs roll", adding that the show features "meaningless platitudes" of a "we're going to do this my way" attitude, and concluded by writing, "All we're left with is a really great concept without the backing of a real leader behind it." Moylan also wrote that "there's not enough family tension for it to be a domestic drama, not enough government intrigue to make it a political show, and not enough investigation to make it a procedural." TVLine's Dave Nemetz drew references between Kirkman and Jack Bauer, Kiefer Sutherland's role in drama thriller 24, writing that "Sutherland does a good job portraying Kirkman's deep ambivalence about the situation he's been handed. But when he has to play hardball with an Iranian ambassador, the tough talk comes too easily to him. It's like Kirkman has been possessed by the ghost of Jack Bauer." Nemetz also questioned the series' longevity; "As compelling as Designated Survivor's concept is, it's hard to see how it will sustain itself as a weekly series."

On Rotten Tomatoes, Season 2 of the series holds an approval rating of 60% based on ten reviews, with an average rating of 5.92/10. The website's critical consensus reads, "Kiefer Sutherland remains commanding enough in Designated Survivor to get him re-elected, but this White House series' escalating earnestness may strike viewers as glaringly naive."

On Rotten Tomatoes, Season 3 of the series holds an approval rating of 67% based on nine reviews, with an average of 6.36/10.

=== Ratings ===
The first episode set a record for DVR viewers with 7.67 million, surpassing the September 25, 2014, record of almost 7 million set by the pilot of How to Get Away with Murder.

Designated Survivor : U.S. viewers per episode (millions)
Audience measurement performed by Nielsen Media Research

=== Accolades ===
Year	Award	Category	Recipient(s)	Result	Ref.
2016	TV Guide	Most Exciting TV Series	Designated Survivor	Won	
2016	Critics' Choice Television Awards	Most Exciting New Series	Designated Survivor	Won	
2017	People's Choice Awards	Favorite New TV Drama	Designated Survivor	Nominated	
2017	People's Choice Awards	Favorite Actor In A New TV Series	Kiefer Sutherland	Nominated	
2017	Saturn Awards	Best Action/Thriller Television Series	Designated Survivor	Nominated	

== International adaptation ==
A South Korean remake titled Designated Survivor: 60 Days, developed by Studio Dragon and produced by DK E&M, premiered on tvN in South Korea and Netflix worldwide on July 1, 2019. Ji Jin-hee portrays the lead role in the series.
