= Safe House (2012 film) =

2012 American film by Daniel Espinosa

- Theatrical release poster
- Directed by: Daniel Espinosa
- Written by: David Guggenheim
- Produced by: Scott Stuber
- Starring: Denzel Washington; Ryan Reynolds; Vera Farmiga; Brendan Gleeson; Sam Shepard; Rubén Blades; Nora Arnezeder; Robert Patrick
- Cinematography: Oliver Wood
- Edited by: Richard Pearson
- Music by: Ramin Djawadi
- Production companies: Relativity Media; Bluegrass Films
- Distributed by: Universal Pictures
- Release dates: February 7, 2012 (New York City); February 10, 2012 (United States)
- Running time: 115 minutes
- Countries: South Africa; United States
- Language: English
- Budget: $85 million
- Box office: $208.1 million

Safe House is a 2012 American action thriller film directed by Daniel Espinosa, written by David Guggenheim, and starring Denzel Washington and Ryan Reynolds. The film follows Matt Weston (Reynolds), a CIA officer on a low-level posting in Cape Town, South Africa, who is in charge of a safe house where the CIA is interrogating Tobin Frost (Washington), a veteran operative accused of betraying the agency. When the safe house is attacked by mercenaries, Weston flees with Frost in his charge. As the team of killers, who seem to be one step ahead of the pair, track them throughout Cape Town, Weston wonders whom to trust. Vera Farmiga, Brendan Gleeson, Sam Shepard, Rubén Blades, Nora Arnezeder and Robert Patrick co-star.

Safe House was Espinosa's first English-language film. Filming took place on location in Cape Town. The film premiered in New York City on February 7, 2012, and was released in U.S. theaters on February 10, 2012, by Universal Pictures. The film earned mixed reviews, with praise for Washington and Reynolds' performances, but negative criticisms for the screenplay and the editing of the action scenes. Nevertheless, the film was a commercial success, earning $208 million worldwide against an $85 million budget.

== Plot ==
In Cape Town, South Africa, junior CIA officer Matt Weston is serving as a "housekeeper", an operative in charge of securing and maintaining a local CIA safe house in case of an operation. He calls his mentor and immediate superior David Barlow, enquiring about a station in Paris. He hopes to move there with his live-in girlfriend Ana, a young French physician about to start her residency. Barlow tells him he is likely underqualified for the position, which frustrates Matt as he has not had a "houseguest" during his year-long tenure and thus has been unable to gain field experience. Barlow promises to revisit the issue in a few months.

Elsewhere in Cape Town, ex-CIA NOC operative turned international criminal Tobin Frost acquires a data storage device from rogue MI6 officer Alec Wade. A team of mercenaries attacks them and kills Wade. Frost flees and, out of options, surrenders to the American consulate.

A team led by veteran Daniel Kiefer transfers Frost to Weston's safe house in order to interrogate him for intelligence before he returns to the US. Weston watches uneasily as Kiefer's team waterboards Frost. The mercenaries, led by Vargas, attack the safe house and kill Kiefer and his team. Weston escapes with Frost and heads to the U.S. Consulate.

En route, Weston contacts Barlow at CIA headquarters in Langley, Virginia, along with Catherine Linklater, the operative in charge of Frost's interrogation and Kiefer's superior, and CIA Deputy Director Harlan Whitford, who is overseeing the operation. Linklater, under advisement from Barlow, orders Weston to lie low and await further instructions.

Weston contacts Ana, giving her a cover story that his office has been threatened and suggesting she stay with friends when it appears their apartment is under surveillance. Barlow tells him to go to the Metrorail station at Green Point Stadium, where he retrieves a GPS device containing the location of another safe house, but Frost creates a diversion and escapes. Weston, detained by the police, escapes and is forced to return fire at them.

Frost's escape is reported. After hearing that Weston fired at the police, Linklater orders him to visit the nearest American embassy for debriefing. When Whitford tells him, "We'll take it from here", Weston decides to pursue Frost himself, as Frost had warned him hearing such phrasing would indicate when Weston should begin to fear for his own safety. While traveling together to South Africa to handle the situation directly, Linklater suggests that Weston has joined with Frost, a notion which Barlow refutes.

Weston tracks Frost to a township in Langa, where Frost meets Carlos Villar, an old friend and document forger, who provides him with travel documents but suggests that he leave his life of crime behind. Vargas' team attacks again, killing Carlos and his wife, but Weston helps Frost escape.

Weston brutally interrogates one of Vargas' wounded mercenaries, who reveals that Vargas is working for the CIA, which is seeking to retrieve the storage device from Frost. As they bandage their wounds, Frost urges Weston not to kill innocent people, telling the story of how he was forced to kill an air traffic controller while on a mission. He later learned that he was simply part of a plot to assassinate a whistle-blower who would expose wetwork committed by the CIA.

Weston takes Frost to the new safe house, where Weston keeps the housekeeper, Keller, at gunpoint. Keller attacks and severely wounds Weston before Weston kills him. Frost reveals the device contains evidence of corruption and bribery involving the CIA, MI6, and other intelligence agencies, put together from a Mossad intelligence report. Frost leaves Weston, who passes out from blood loss.

Barlow kills Linklater and travels to the safe house where he reveals that he is Vargas' employer. He confirms that the file contains incriminating evidence against him, and encourages Weston to aide in the coverup by implicating Frost in the deaths of Keller and Linklater. Frost returns and kills Vargas' team and Vargas himself but is fatally wounded by Barlow; Weston then shoots and kills Barlow. As he dies, Frost gives Weston the file, saying he is a better man than Frost.

Back in the United States, Weston meets with Director Whitford, who informs him that unflattering facts about the CIA must be removed from his report, but that he will be promoted. When asked about the file's location, Weston denies knowing about it. Whitford states that whoever has those files will have many enemies. Weston assures him that he will "take it from here" before leaving, visibly shaking Whitford.

Weston leaks the files to the media, incriminating personnel from many intelligence agencies, including Whitford. He then travels to Paris and covertly observes Ana while she sits with friends in a cafe. She notices him across the street and smiles before he walks away, content that she is safe.

== Cast ==
- Denzel Washington as Tobin Frost
- Ryan Reynolds as Matt Weston
- Vera Farmiga as Catherine Linklater
- Brendan Gleeson as David Barlow
- Sam Shepard as Harlan Whitford
- Rubén Blades as Carlos Villar
- Nora Arnezeder as Ana Moreau
- Robert Patrick as Daniel Kiefer
- Liam Cunningham as Alec Wade
- Joel Kinnaman as Keller
- Fares Fares as Vargas

== Production ==
In February 2010, it was reported Universal Pictures had acquired the David Guggenheim penned spec script Safe House, about a young CIA agent who must find a way to transport a dangerous prisoner to another safe house when the one he works at is compromised, with Scott Stuber set to produce. Universal acquired the script following a heated bidding war between several other producers and studios. In July of that year, Denzel Washington had entered talks to star in the film with Daniel Espinosa set to direct and perform a rewrite on the script with Guggenheim. Safe House appeared on the 2010 Black List of best unproduced screenplays. By August, Ryan Reynolds was the front runner for the role opposite Washington. In February 2011, it was reported that Liam Cunningham, Brendan Gleeson, Robert Patrick and Sam Shepard had joined the cast. Prior to the rewrites, the script originally took place in Rio de Janeiro, Brazil.

== Soundtrack ==
Safe House: Original Motion Picture Soundtrack

Soundtrack album by Ramin Djawadi
- Released: February 21, 2012
- Genre: Film score
- Length: 68:51
- Label: Varèse Sarabande 067137
- Producer: Ramin Djawadi

Ramin Djawadi chronology
Fright Night (2011)	Safe House: Original Motion Picture Soundtrack (2012)	Game of Thrones: Season 2 (2012)

Ramin Djawadi composed the score to the film.

All music by Ramin Djawadi.

Track listing
No.	Title	Length
1.	"Safe House"	3:15
2.	"A Hundred Lies a Day"	3:15
3.	"Get in the Trunk"	4:24
4.	"Do I Make You Nervous?"	3:07
5.	"I Used to Be Innocent Like You"	2:11
6.	"Tobin Frost"	2:19
7.	"Off the Grid"	3:27
8.	"Do What You Have to Do"	4:48
9.	"Don't Kill Innocent People"	3:45
10.	"Who Do You Work For?"	3:44
11.	"Walk Away"	6:03
12.	"People Change"	2:16
13.	"Be Better Than Me"	4:11
14.	"Langa"	6:14
15.	"More Past Than Future"	3:19
16.	"12 Months"	3:05
17.	"Truth"	3:42
18.	"I'll Take It From Here"	5:46
Total length:		68:51

Songs used in the film but not included in the soundtrack album were:

- "Rebel Blues" performed by Lëk Sèn
- "No Church in the Wild" performed by Kanye West & Jay-Z featuring Frank Ocean

== Release ==
The film premiered in New York City on February 7, 2012, and was released in U.S. theaters on February 10, 2012. Safe House was released to Blu-ray and DVD on June 5, 2012, in the United States.

== Reception ==
=== Box office ===
Safe House grossed $126.4 million in the United States, and $81.7 million in other territories, for a worldwide total of $208.1 million.

Safe House earned $13.6 million on opening day, and a total of $40.2 million over the weekend, finishing second behind The Vow. The film was the second-biggest opener for Washington, behind American Gangster ($43.6 million), and third-best for Reynolds behind X-Men Origins: Wolverine ($85.1 million) and Green Lantern ($53.2 million), respectively. In its second weekend, it finished first at $23.6 million. It became the second film in 2012 to cross the $100 million mark domestically after The Vow and the fourth film to cross the mark worldwide after Underworld: Awakening, Journey 2: The Mysterious Island, and The Vow.

=== Critical response ===
On the review aggregator website Rotten Tomatoes, 52% of 192 critics' reviews are positive, with an average rating of 5.4/10. The website's consensus reads: "Safe House stars Washington and Reynolds are let down by a thin script and choppily edited action sequences." Metacritic, which uses a weighted average, assigned the film a score of 52 out of 100, based on 36 critics, indicating "mixed or average" reviews. Audiences polled by CinemaScore gave the film an average grade of "A−" on an A+ to F scale.

== Future ==
In September 2012, it was announced that Universal had hired screenwriter David Guggenheim to write a script for a possible sequel.
