= Paul McGuigan (director) =

Scottish film and television director

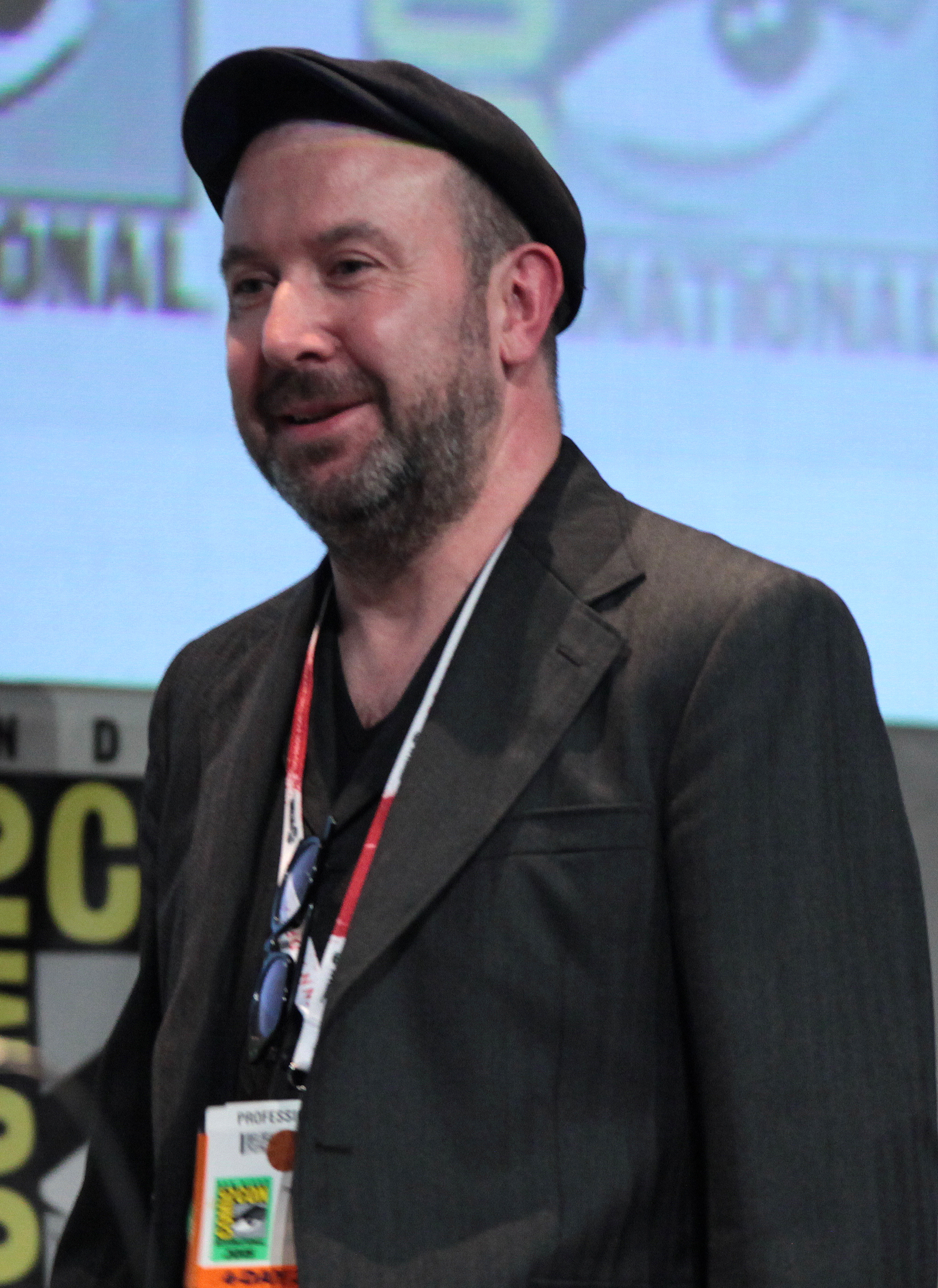
- McGuigan in 2015
- Born: 19 September 1963 (age 63); Bellshill, Scotland
- Occupations: Film and television director
- Years active: 1998–present

Paul McGuigan (born 19 September 1963) is a Scottish film and television director, best known for directing films such as Lucky Number Slevin, Gangster No. 1 and Push. He has also directed episodes of Sherlock, Scandal, Monroe and Smash. He was born in Bellshill Maternity Hospital, Scotland.

== Filmography ==
=== Film ===
- The Acid House (1998)
- Gangster No. 1 (2000)
- The Reckoning (2004)
- Wicker Park (2004)
- Lucky Number Slevin (2006)
- Push (2009)
- Victor Frankenstein (2015)
- Film Stars Don't Die in Liverpool (2017)

=== Television ===
Year	Title	Notes
2006	Thief	Episode: "Pilot"
2008	Takedown	Web series; 6 episodes
2010	Sherlock	2 episodes: "A Study in Pink" and "The Great Game"
2011	Monroe	3 episodes
2012	Scandal	"Sweet Baby"
2012	Sherlock	2 episodes: "A Scandal in Belgravia" and "The Hounds of Baskerville"
2012	Smash	"Hell on Earth"
2013	Devious Maids	"Pilot"
2013	Lucky 7	"Pilot"
2016	The Family	3 episodes: "Pilot", "All the Live Long Day" and "What Took So Long"
2016	Luke Cage	2 episodes: "Moment of Truth" and "Code of the Streets"
2016	Designated Survivor	"Pilot"
2017	Kevin (Probably) Saves the World	"Pilot"
2019	Carnival Row	"Some Dark God Wakes"
2019–20	Emergence	3 episodes: "Pilot", "Where You Belong" and "Killshot Prt. 2"
2020	Dracula	"The Dark Compass"
2020	Big Sky	2 episodes: "Pilot" & "Nowhere to Run"
2022	Inside Man	Miniseries, 4 episodes
2023	Will Trent	"Pilot"
2023	Judgement	"Laws of Attraction"
2026	The Undeclared War	
2026	R.J. Decker	3 episodes

== Awards ==
Year	Awarded by	Award
1998	Royal Television Society	Won, Best Newcomer Award, The Granton Star Cause
1998	Stockholm Film Festival	Won, FIPRESCI Prize, The Acid House (For its originality in presenting a crass Scottish everyday world in a surreal, almost hallucinogenic light, very true to its author and its adventurous visual style.); Nominated, Bronze Horse, The Acid House
1999	Fantasporto	Won, AMC Audience Award and Grand Prize of European Fantasy Film in Silver, The Acid House; Nominated, International Fantasy Film Award, The Acid House
1999	Catalan International Film Festival	Nominated, Grand Prize of European Fantasy Film in Gold, The Acid House
1999	New York Underground Film Festival	Nominated, Best film, The Acid House
2000	AFI Fest	Nominated, Grand Jury Prize, Gangster No. 1
2000	Dinard Festival of British Cinema	Nominated, Golden Hitchcock, Gangster No. 1
2000	European Film Awards	Nominated, European Discovery of the Year, Gangster No. 1
2004	Montréal World Film Festival	Nominated, Grand Prix des Amériques, Wicker Park
2012	Primetime Emmy Award	Nominated, Directing for a Miniseries, Movie or a Dramatic Special, Sherlock: A Scandal in Belgravia
