= David Guggenheim =

American screenwriter, producer, and novelist

- Born: Long Island, New York, United States
- Years active: 2012–present
- Family: Marc Guggenheim (brother); Eric Guggenheim (brother)

David Guggenheim is an American screenwriter, producer, and novelist.

He is best known for writing the 2012 films Safe House and Stolen, as well as creating and writing for the 2016 television series Designated Survivor.

In 2013, the film rights to a suspense novel published by Little, Brown and Company that Guggenheim co-wrote with Nicholas Mennuti entitled Weaponized, were purchased by Bluegrass Films and Guggenheim was attached as screenwriter. He also worked on an earlier draft of Bad Boys for Life, and the screenplays for Uncharted and the upcoming film Narco Sub.

His older brothers are screenwriters Marc Guggenheim and Eric Guggenheim.

In 2019, Guggenheim joined other WGA writers in firing their agents as part of the WGA's stand against the ATA and the practice of packaging.

In 2023, Guggenheim announced that he would once again join with the WGA in the 2023 writers strike.

== Filmography ==
Film

Year	Title	Writer	Executive Producer
2012	Safe House	Yes	No
2012	Stolen	Yes	No
2018	The Christmas Chronicles	Story	Yes
2020	The Christmas Chronicles 2	No	Yes
2024	The Union	Yes	No

Television

Year	Title	Writer	Executive Producer	Creator	Notes
2015	Exit Strategy	Yes	Co-Executive	No	TV movie
2016-2019	Designated Survivor	Yes	Yes	Yes	Wrote 5 episodes
