= The Following season 2 =

The Following
- Season 2
- DVD cover
- No. of episodes: 15

Release
- Original network: Fox
- Original release: January 19 – April 28, 2014

Season chronology
- ← Previous; Season 1 Next → Season 3

The second season of the Fox American television psychological thriller series The Following premiered on January 19, 2014 and concluded on April 28, 2014, with a total of 15 episodes.

== Plot ==
The second season centers on former FBI agent Ryan Hardy (Kevin Bacon) and his niece, NYPD detective Max Hardy (Jessica Stroup) and their attempts to find serial killer Joe Carroll (James Purefoy) following Joe's faked death. After a new group, led by Lily Gray (Connie Nielsen) and her sons Mark and Luke (Sam Underwood), begins to develop and make public statements to lure Joe out of his hiding, Mike Weston (Shawn Ashmore) is re-recruited in order to find the new potential cult and teams with Ryan and Max to track down Joe and Lily. Meanwhile, Joe is back to his old ways as he, along with his right-hand Emma (Valorie Curry), begin to draw plans to turn a new group of followers to his will. Things take a turn when Joe's ex-wife and the woman Ryan had an affair with, Claire Matthews (Natalie Zea), again enters the picture after Ryan and Joe believed her to be dead.

== Cast ==
=== Main cast ===
- Kevin Bacon as Ryan Hardy, a former FBI agent (15 episodes)
- Shawn Ashmore as Mike Weston, a young FBI agent (15 episodes)
- Valorie Curry as Emma Hill, a follower and close friend of Joe Carroll (14 episodes)
- Sam Underwood as Luke and Mark Gray, twins that are both followers and sons of Lily Gray (12 episodes)
- Jessica Stroup as Max Hardy, niece of Ryan Hardy and a New York City Police Department detective (13 episodes)
- Tiffany Boone as Mandy Lang, daughter of Judy, and daughter-figure to Joe Carroll (11 episodes)
- Natalie Zea as Claire Matthews, Joe Carroll's ex-wife and long-time love interest of Ryan Hardy (8 episodes)
- Connie Nielsen as Lily Gray, once-admirer of Carroll, and mother to Luke and Mark (10 episodes)
- James Purefoy as Joe Carroll, a former professor turned serial killer and cult leader (15 episodes)

=== Recurring ===
- Valerie Cruz as Agent Gina Mendez, head of the investigation on Carroll and the new cult formed a year after his supposed death (8 episodes)
- Sprague Grayden as Carrie Cooke, a tabloid reporter and author of The Havenport Tragedy (8 episodes)
- Shane McRae as Robert, a leader in the Korban cult (8 episodes)
- Mackenzie Marsh as Tilda, Korban member and follower of Carroll (6 episodes)
- Felix Solis as Agent Clarke, FBI agent (6 episodes)
- Camille De Pazzis as Gisele, a follower of Lily Gray, working closely with Luke and Mark (5 episodes)
- Kyle Barisich as Hopkins, FBI information and computer specialist (5 episodes)
- Montego Glover as Agent Lawrence, FBI information and computer specialist (5 episodes)
- Susan Heyward as Hannah, one of Joe Carroll's followers (5 episodes)
- John Lafayette as Marshal Scott Turner, former head of the Marshal's detail participating in the investigation of Carroll's cult; provides protection for Claire Matthews (4 episodes)
- Tom Cavanagh as Kingston Tanner, televangelist who denounces Carroll (4 episodes)
- Carter Jenkins as Preston Tanner, Kingston Tanner's son (4 episodes)
- Carrie Preston as Judy, admirer of Carroll with whom Carroll lives for a year after going into hiding; Judy's daughter regards Joe Carroll as a father figure (3 episodes)
- Bambadjan Bamba as Sami, Lily Gray's illegitimate son (3 episodes)
- Rita Markova as Radmilla, Lily Gray's illegitimate daughter (3 episodes)
- Jacinda Barrett as Julia, Micah's wife and second-in-command of Korban (3 episodes)
- Jake Weber as Micah, the leader of the Korban cult (3 episodes)
- J.D. Williams as Carlos, a follower of Carroll, working closely with Luke and Mark (3 episodes)
- Josh Salatin as Lucas, Korban member and follower of Carroll (3 episodes)
- Liza de Weerd as Angela, Korban member and follower of Carroll (3 episodes)
- Leslie Bibb as Jana Murphy, Gina Mendez's ex-partner, follower of Joe Carroll (2 episodes)
- Gregg Henry as Dr. Arthur Strauss, Joe Carroll's mentor and introducer to killing (2 episodes)

== Episodes ==
No. overall	No. in season	Title	Directed by	Written by	Original release date	Prod. code	US viewers (millions)
16	1	"Resurrection"	Marcos Siega	Kevin Williamson	January 19, 2014	2J7551	11.18
According to Mike Weston, Claire Matthews died from wounds inflicted by Molly's stabbing. During the attack, Ryan Hardy twists Molly's neck and kills her. A year later, Ryan has moved to New York City where he lives on his own and is teaching. On the first anniversary of Joe Carroll's death, a group of remaining cult members attack several passengers on a subway car. The FBI brings Ryan and Weston back on board to assist in gaining information on the identity and motives of the attackers. Ryan dismisses the FBI's request for his help and appears to want nothing to do with the situation. However, back in his home, he continues his secret interest in Joe and the case along with his niece, Max Hardy, a New York City detective. New followers of Joe are also revealed including twins, Mark and Luke while Joe himself is revealed to be alive with a new appearance.
17	2	"For Joe"	Joshua Butler	Vincent Angell	January 27, 2014	2J7552	6.02
Joe is living with a former admirer of his, a prostitute, Judy, and her daughter, Mandy, under the alias "Uncle Daryl" (Judy's supposed brother who just returned home from war in Afghanistan). One of the men Judy sleeps with, a local reverend, comes by her house looking for Judy but finds she isn't home yet. After realizing Joe's true identity from a television news report, the reverend is killed by Joe with Mandy's help. The twins, Mark and Luke, break into the home of a couple with a young child. Ryan is led to the house by Max's tracking of the twins' phone during a call. The twins continue to draw Ryan's attention by having him show up at a benefit event where the only survivor of the subway murders and new interest of Ryan, Lily Gray, is speaking. After an attempted attack, Ryan helps Lily go unharmed and shoots Luke in the arm, with the only other injury being to Lily's assistant, David. The twins escape as Luke tends to his injury. Meanwhile, Emma is currently living with other remaining cult members with an entirely new look. She becomes interested in finding out the identity of the murderers making the news and eventually finds a way to call them, leading to the realization that Joe may not actually be dead.
18	3	"Trust Me"	Liz Friedlander	Alexi Hawley	February 3, 2014	2J7553	5.84
Joe reveals to Judy and Mandy his plans to leave their home at night as Judy expresses her resentment for Joe murdering the reverend. She pulls a gun on Joe but he had previously taken out all of the bullets. He attempts to choke her to death but stops when Mandy begs for him to. Joe ties Judy up, setting up a crime scene implicating the reverend for when the police discover the home. Joe looks for his knife, but Mandy finds it and proceeds to stab her mother to death. Joe sets the home on fire before departing with Mandy. Meanwhile, Agent Mendez and other investigators find Emma's home and raid it, killing all of the followers inside but one, who is taken into custody. At the time, Emma was out meeting with Mark, as the two exchange information about their respective groups of Joe's followers. He brings her back to his room where she meets Luke, Gisele, and Carlos, though Luke soon-after stabs Carlos, killing him. Ryan continues to visit and talk to Lily against orders banning interaction between the two. He soon discovers her in a lie and with the help of Weston's subway video footage realizes that Lily is involved with the cult. Lily escapes and taunts Ryan over the phone. She meets up with Luke, who drives away after calling her "mother."
19	4	"Family Affair"	Marcos Siega	Brett Mahoney	February 10, 2014	2J7554	4.76
Joe and Mandy sneak into the house of a young mother with two children. The mother, Jana, is revealed to be a friend of Joe and provides him with a fake ID and cash. She tells Joe she has not been able to find his son, Joey. The FBI finds out that Lily was adopted by a billionaire and had inherited his money. There are no records of her giving birth but a former housekeeper had given birth to twin boys before her death. Meanwhile, Luke and Lily arrive at Lily's large country estate where they are greeted by Mark, as well as others all of whom refer to Lily as their mother. Emma is also at the house but due to her feelings for Joe, she remains uncomfortable despite Lily's attempts at warming up to her. When Joe calls, Emma hesitantly tells him that it is safe for him to come there. Joe arrives and embraces Emma, who bursts into hysterical tears before he moves on to meet the rest of the group. Meanwhile, Ryan continues to track Agent Mendez and the FBI's work on the case despite their unsuccessful surveillance of him. Max helps Ryan find the residence of Lily's lawyer David, where he is found dead on the floor. David's murderer, Gisele, gets away before Ryan realizes who she is. Ryan is arrested by Agent Mendez but is released soon thereafter. Weston, in disbelief that Joe could be alive, visits Max at her office advising her to back off from helping Ryan, however she insists she has no involvement. With Max's help, Ryan chases Gisele through city streets, however Gisele manages to get on a train just before it pulls out of the station. Ryan calls Max and she reveals she too is on the train, looking at Gisele. Meanwhile Agent Mendez makes a phone call to her significant other, informing her that she will working late and will be unable to pick up the kids. Her partner is revealed to be Joe's friend, Jana. She complains that she had to give up becoming an FBI agent in order to care for their kids.
20	5	"Reflection"	Nicole Kassell	Lizzie Mickery	February 17, 2014	2J7555	5.19
Lily introduces Joe to everyone in the house. Emma expresses her bitter feelings towards Joe abandoning her; he apologizes repeatedly and asks for another chance. Luke and Jamel, another one of Lily's "sons", go to meet up with Gisele. However, Max and Ryan catch up with Gisele, bringing her to a local motel where they handcuff and question her. Gisele gives up the supposed location of Joe, which is really the warehouse she was supposed to meet Luke and Jamel. Ryan heads there and is confronted by Luke and Jamel. Ryan shoots Jamel dead, but is shot in the stomach in return. Meanwhile Gisele breaks her thumb to escape the handcuffs (while Max is distracted), and runs away to meet up with Luke. The two follow Ryan's trail to a local house, where Ryan attempts to clean up his wound as the homeowner shows up and panics. Gisele then enters the house and falsely tells Ryan that she killed Max, whereupon Ryan stabs Gisele with her own knife. Luke runs into the house and holds Gisele as she dies, while Ryan runs off. Back at the estate, Lily requests that Mark distract Emma for a bit. Mark locks himself and Emma in Lily's art room to allow Emma to draw, an old passion of hers. Emma leans in to kiss him as he reveals he cannot handle body contact unless he initiates it himself. Meanwhile, Lily has locked a young school girl in a cage and drugged her, presenting her to Joe as a gift for him to kill. Joe angrily refuses at first, thinking Lily is attempting to control him, but later goes through with the murder. Weston, Mendez, and the FBI discover an image of Joe and Mandy from a surveillance camera, but fail to actually identify the man in the picture as Joe. Ryan returns to the motel and embraces Max upon seeing her alive.
21	6	"Fly Away"	Rob Seidenglanz	Dewayne Jones	February 24, 2014	2J7556	4.61
After spending the night together, Joe and Lily discuss Lily's idea of moving everyone to another one of her homes in Venezuela, to which Joe hesitantly agrees. Ryan invites Weston to bring the FBI to Connecticut, where he and Max have been tracking Lily's group. Weston however comes alone; He, Ryan and Max capture Luke at a field near Lily's estate. Ryan proposes a trade with Lily, offering Luke in exchange for Joe. Lily agrees with the plan. Lily however drugs Joe unconscious, then accompanied by Mark, brings a hostage instead for the exchange. Max lets Luke go in exchange for Lily's captive being released, unharmed. Lily, Mark, and Luke run off to the estate as Weston and Max chase after them. Outside Lily's estate Ryan encounters one of her other sons, proceeding to stab and kill him. Inside, Emma and Mandy are able to arouse Joe in order to escape the house as Ryan is closing in. Lily's daughter attempts to stop them from escaping, and is killed. Ryan makes it into the house just as Joe, Emma, & Mandy are leaving from a window. Joe stares Ryan down before they escape. Weston catches up with Luke and shoots him. Believing it too late to save Luke, Lily and Mark drive off. Luke however has a bulletproof vest, and Weston beats him up, leaving him bloody and unconscious. Meanwhile the FBI blocks an airplane from departing, believed to have Joe inside. The pilot however reports that Joe and the girls left the plane after he had gotten a phone call. Ryan tells Mendez he saw Joe alive and he was the man in the plane, which Mendez claims she will handle on her own, also announcing that Max and Weston have now lost their jobs for their involvement. Ryan, Max, and Weston conclude that somebody from the FBI must be compromised and feeding Joe information. Emma gets a call from Lily, which Joe answers and expresses his contempt with Lily's news of Luke's supposed death, causing Lily to have an emotional breakdown.
22	7	"Sacrifice"	Adam Davidson	Scott Reynolds	March 3, 2014	2J7557	5.16
Joe, Emma, and Mandy arrive at a cult compound. Two authority figures in the cult, Robert and Julia, have them blindfolded and handcuffed before entering the trucks. Joe meets with Micah, the cult's leader, and offers his help with the cult in exchange for a place to stay. Julia gives Joe a lie detector test to ensure his intentions are genuine. He, Emma, and Mandy are taken to a ceremony which involves taking blood from a new member to wash away all of their sins, bringing them a step closer to "going home." Emma is selected and strapped to a post where Micah slits her wrists and eventually drinks her blood. She faints, but survives. Meanwhile Ryan meets with Agent Mendez about his suspicion that someone in the FBI is giving Joe information, however Ryan is uncertain he can trust her. Max asks Ryan to give up on chasing Joe, but Ryan admits he's formed an obsession and must kill him. Weston is unstable after assaulting Luke so he leaves the FBI building to go home. Max is captured by a man hired by Lily, as the man's son records the capture on video. The man ties her up and hangs her by her hands from the ceiling of a basement. Upon learning this, Weston returns to help find Max. After Ryan receives the video of Max on his phone, he questions Luke who remains in custody at a hospital, still recovering from the assault. Luke reveals the man's name: Kurt (Bowlen), known as "The Huntsman" - a known serial killer. After the FBI finds Kurt's home, Ryan and Weston handcuff his son until he divulges the whereabouts of his father. Meanwhile Max escapes into the woods, with Kurt chasing her. FBI police dogs track them down and Weston finds Max right before Kurt is shot dead by Ryan. Ryan receives a video text message from Lily and puts it on screen in the FBI's office. Weston recognizes Lily is at his father's house, as the video turns to his father strapped in a chair. Mark slits his throat and kills him. As Weston runs out of the room crying hysterically, Lily teases Ryan that she has more surprises in store for him. Ryan catches Weston weeping outside and holds him.
23	8	"The Messenger"	Marcos Siega	Alexi Hawley	March 10, 2014	2J7558	4.86
Ryan and Max attend the funeral for Weston's father. Afterwards, a journalist, Carrie Cooke, with an apparent history with Ryan shows up and unsuccessfully tries to get him to comment on Joe. Director Franklin of the FBI tells Ryan that he wants him working on the case and will supply him with whatever he needs to work off the books. Max and Ryan turn their focus to Joe's college professor, Dr. Arthur Strauss, who lives an hour away from the lighthouse where the events took place. Ryan goes to Strauss' home and questions him about Joe while planting a microphone in his living room. He leaves after Strauss insists he has no involvement. Carrie comes to Strauss' home for interview questions but is captured upon entering the house, which Ryan hears over the audio receiver and rushes back to the house. One of Strauss' students, Cole, sprays a chemical into Ryan's face, causing him to temporarily faint. Ryan wakes up tied to a wheelchair, across from Carrie who is strapped to an operating table. He has a flashback to a few months prior, waking up to Carrie telling him they slept together despite him not remembering after a night of heavy drinking. Strauss also has a flashback, of Joe showing up after the lighthouse events, injured and needing help. Weston finds Strauss' student Cole and shoots him. Ryan frees himself and then Carrie. Ryan and Weston tie Strauss to the table and whip his hand until he reveals that Joe had a connection to a female in the FBI. Back at Micah's cult, Emma insists to Joe that they leave, but then Micah officially initiates them and Mandy into the group. In private, Micah tells Joe of his interest in killing people and having Joe write a book about him. Joe and Micah discuss taking the cult to the next level, despite Julia being against the idea. Micah suggests throwing Joe a celebration, but Julia expresses her concern about having Joe around causing too much attention to their cult. At a party, Micah passes out communion wafers to some of the cult members, including a new friend of Mandy's, Erik. The wafers eventually cause them to foam at the mouth and kill them. Later, tension between Micah and Julia continues to grow stronger. Joe tells Emma that their next move is to tell the world he's alive.
24	9	"Unmasked"	Nicole Kassell	Vincent Angell	March 17, 2014	2J7559	3.95
Max and Weston narrow their list of possible moles in the FBI, a list that includes Agent Mendez. Ryan doesn't believe she's guilty, but questions her outside of her apartment. Ryan and Weston then track Mendez as she travels to her ex lover Jana's house. Jana brings Mendez into the garage to talk, where Jana stabs her. Jana's friend lets Mike and Ryan in. They find Mendez and have an ambulance called before cornering Jana and questioning her about where Joe is. Jana proceeds to shoot herself in the head. Mendez is taken away, alive, in an ambulance. Micah asks Joe for advice about how to handle Julia and the tension between the two. Joe and Micah later kill her after a failed attempt on her part to shoot them. Micah tells Joe of his desire to "make a splash". Micah sends Robert and Emma on a mission as his "messengers" along with an ex-killer cult member, Lance. Robert, Emma, and Lance show up at a book store where Carrie is having a book signing and they begin killing at random before Emma hands Carrie a video clip, instructing her to share it with the world or else they'd come back for her. Robert and Emma escape, but Lance purposely stays behind and is eventually shot dead after holding a knife to a police officer. Carrie plays the clip on her news report, which Joe watches along with Micah, Emma, and Robert. While watching, Joe hands out drinks to the group. Micah realizes the video being shown is not the one he had intended for them to deliver. Rather, it is a video of Joe announcing to the world that he's still alive and nobody is to feel safe. Micah then falls to the floor dead foaming at the mouth, due to his drink being poisoned. Robert later gathers the cult and proclaims Joe as their new leader. Back at Ryan's apartment, Weston and Max leave Ryan to spend the evening with Carrie who is later kissed by Ryan. Weston gets into a car with unknown men, and is transferred to another car and blindfolded on the way to a location where he meets up with Marshal Scott Turner. Turner brings him to a room where he's greeted by Claire Matthews.
25	10	"Teacher's Pet"	Marcos Siega	Brett Mahoney	March 24, 2014	2J7560	4.07
A flashback shows Claire in the hospital, with Weston and Turner telling her the plan to put her into witness protection and not tell anyone that she is alive, including Ryan. In present day, Weston catches Claire up on everything and she expresses interest in helping find Joe instead of letting witness protection move her, but Weston insists she stays safe. At Korban, Robert introduces Joe to a group (Mallory, Lucas, Patrick, and Tilda) who have volunteered to be the next messengers. Tilda picks out her choice of first victim and Lucas kills the man. They later kill another innocent family. At both murders, they leave behind a note saying "no redemption without blood." With the help of Carrie, Ryan gets the message out to Joe that the FBI has captured Dr. Strauss and he is cooperating. This leads Joe to call Jana, but Ryan answers her phone as the FBI unsuccessfully tries to track down Joe's location. Flashbacks show a younger Joe as he was first mentored by Dr. Strauss, where Strauss revealed more about Joe's past: Joe was sent to America by his uncle after his parents both died. Back at Korban, Emma and Mandy argue after Mandy walked out of a gathering with Joe and other Korban members. Mallory and Patrick later go to a restaurant that Mallory was previously fired from to make their next murder. FBI shows up after Max tips Ryan off about Mallory. Ryan tries to get information about where Joe is out of Mallory, but Patrick slits her throat before being shot dead. Joe anoints Tilda and Lucas once they return from their mission. Carrie and Ryan fool around again after Carrie tries to convince Ryan that he's making progress, professionally and personally. Claire tells Turner that she refuses to go to Arizona, and instead wants to see Ryan.
26	11	"Freedom"	Liz Friedlander	Dewayne Jones	March 31, 2014	2J7561	4.17
Joe gathers a group of Korban followers and has a volunteer stab another Korban member, Carla, to kill her, thus "sending her home." Robert confronts Joe about his reason for choosing Carla, as she was close to Robert. Joe calms him down and asks Emma to follow him and ensure she's able to keep him close enough to stop worrying. Joe and Emma also discuss Mandy's lack of progress at Korban, with Emma feeling like she's a lost cause. Later, she looks up Mark's number online, and calls him after packing a bag and leaving Korban. Meanwhile, Ryan and Mike continue researching information on Lily Gray and cults that believe in blood sacrifice. Two men cause chaos after stabbing a group of people at a bakery, sending them all to the hospital. At the hospital, two of Lily's helpers, Serena and Decklan, and a few others follow a plan put together by Lily to rescue Luke and send him home to Lily and Mark. Luke escapes the hospital after being chased down by Ryan, though Serena and Decklan are killed by Mike and Ryan, respectively. Carrie goes on air to report the news of the attack, which Joe and Emma angrily watch. Claire again requests to see Ryan, feeling she can help him. She's given permission, provided her son and mother are moved to another location which Claire will not be given information on unless she returns to witness protection. She later shows up at Ryan's apartment as Mike panics and tells Ryan that he can explain everything.
27	12	"Betrayal"	Marcos Siega	Lizzie Mickery	April 7, 2014	2J7562	4.41
Ryan remains in shock over seeing Claire alive. Claire suggests she can lure Joe out if he finds out she's alive, but Ryan disagrees. Carrie interviews tele-evangalist preacher Kingston Tanner who has recently criticized Joe. Joe watches, telling Emma how he wishes to give Kingston a "Holy War". He sends Lucas, Angela, Tilda and Robert to find Carrie; they assault her guards as Joe calls her forcing her to broadcast another message, unless she and her love ones pay. Ryan receives the video from Carrie and watches it with Claire. They deduce Joe is going after Kingston's son, Preston. Ryan leaves with Mike and has Max stay back with Claire. Max tells Claire how Ryan has moved on, with Max expressing how Ryan nearly fell apart from Claire's fake death and how she wants what's best for him. Meanwhile, Mandy meets up with Mark, who asks for Joe's location, but Mandy says she can't tell. He takes her to Lily's home and still refusing to give Joe's location to Lily, Mark and Luke proceed to torture Mandy. Joe and Emma discover that Mandy left Korban to find Lily, leading Joe to call Lily wanting Mandy. Lily says she'll let Mandy go if Joe gives himself up, but he denies the offer by telling Mandy he loves her and then hanging up the phone. Lily and the twins kill Mandy while Joe blames Emma over her death. Robert and the others superglue masks on the college students of a fraternity, while Tilda kidnaps Preston. Mike and Ryan arrive and Mike kills Lucas during the ensuing battle. Ryan tells Mike to take care of Claire and Max before he follows Joe's followers back to the Korban compound. Carrie broadcasts Joe's message, then goes to Ryan's apartment and meets Claire, who says she can help Ryan by helping her. As Preston meets Joe at Korban, Ryan arrives as well.
28	13	"The Reaping"	Joshua Butler	Megan Martin	April 14, 2014	2J7563	4.36
Having previously kidnapped Preston Tanner, Joe's followers return to Korban unaware that Ryan Hardy has followed them, however he doesn't have a phone and doesn't have backup. He kills a guard and disguises himself as a Korban member. During Joe's speech to everyone, Ryan takes a shot, but misses and narrowly escapes. Claire Matthews desperately wants to be interviewed live on the air for Joe to see, but Carrie, Max and Mike decide against it. Instead, Claire has a message delivered from Carrie Cooke to Joe that only he will understand. Lily has her men track Joe's location through her phone, as Mark questions why she needs to get revenge, to which Lily says Joe must pay for what he did. Joe discovers that Ryan is at Korban, and Ryan gives himself up and meets Joe so he can figure out his plan. The FBI have now located Lily Gray's whereabouts except she is a footstep in front of them and is headed to Korban to get Joe. Joe then has Ryan watch as Preston is forced to either kill someone or be killed. Ryan tries to talk Preston out of it but he sadly kills a member of Korban who didn't believe in Joe. Emma begins to worry when Lily's men crash through the front gate as she believes it may be the FBI, so she, Joe and Robert leave Korban, but are shocked that Joe wants Ryan to live despite them telling him to kill him. Lily's men raid Korban, killing numerous cult members, which allows Ryan to escape his captors and kill 3 of Lily's men. Joe and a small group of members watch Carrie's message to Joe, leaving Joe believing that Claire is alive. While Max finds Ryan, Mike goes off on his own to find Lily. Mike corners Lily and, despite Ryan and Max trying to persuade him not to, Mike shoots Lily repeatedly in the chest, killing her in cold blood.
29	14	"Silence"	Steve Shill	Scott Reynolds	April 21, 2014	2J7564	4.42
Mark and Luke escape after hearing of their mother's death, swearing vengeance on Mike, Ryan, and Joe. Max and Ryan lie to Clarke over Lily's death to ensure Mike doesn't face charges. Ryan later confronts Claire over her message to Joe and the two share a kiss. Joe sends his followers out to capture Kingston while having Robert and Emma track down Claire, admitting the message Carrie broadcast was a poem he and Claire made together that only they knew about. Angela arrives at Kingston's home and sets herself on fire to lure Kingston out as Joe's men take him. Ryan and Mike follow them to a church where Joe and the others hold everyone inside hostage. Claire is prepared to be sent home, but escapes after utilizing some of Ryan's weapons. She goes to the hotel she was going to meet with Joe, but finds Emma instead. As Robert subdues her, Emma betrays Robert and kills him and goes after Claire. The two engage in a violent struggle with Claire killing Emma by stabbing her and throwing her out of a third-story window. The twins show up and take Claire hostage. At the church, Joe has everything video taped and forces Kingston to admit there is no God. Even after that, Joe forces son and father to kill one another, to which Kingston takes his own life rather than kill his son. Ryan and Mike enter the church, but Mike reveals himself to Joe after Joe threatens to shoot Preston. Joe tells Ryan to show himself or he'll kill Mike, proceeded by a gunshot.
30	15	"Forgive"	Marcos Siega	Kevin Williamson	April 28, 2014	2J7565	4.81
The shot fired was aimed at Preston, which kills him. Ryan calls Claire, but Luke answers her phone and instructs Ryan to bring Joe, alive, to him or Claire will die. Ryan informs Joe of Luke's threat and helps Joe escape the church. With Joe in the back seat and Mike and Max following behind, Ryan drives to the address given by Luke while the FBI shut the lights inside the church and proceed to shoot and kill all of Joe's followers inside. Along the way, one of Joe's followers, Tim, crashes into Ryan's car, flipping it with Ryan and Joe inside, injuring both men. Joe thanks and then shoots Tim and puts Ryan into Tim's car and continues the drive. Outside the house, Ryan and Joe find letters inviting them inside for dinner. Once inside, they find Claire right before one of the twins drops a smoke bomb, putting Ryan, Joe, and Claire to sleep. They wake up at a table where Mark and Luke interrogate Ryan and Joe, threatening to kill Claire if they don't cooperate. Mike and Max show up and Mike shoots at Luke through a window while Joe cuts himself free. After everyone splits, Mike finds Mark and tells him that he killed Lily, not Ryan. Luke knocks Mike down but Max shoots Luke dead. Mark picks up Luke's body and runs off while a confrontation between Joe and Claire leads to Ryan putting Joe at gunpoint as Joe begs Ryan to kill him. Ryan, however, chooses not to shoot Joe and has Mike call Agent Clarke to have Joe arrested. Ryan suggests to Claire that he pack a bag and move to Claire's home with her and Joey but Claire tells him that they need to move on separately so she can give her son a normal life. Mike admits to Max that he would have killed Joe before the two share a kiss. That night, Ryan has a nightmare where he finds Luke's dead body lying in bed next to him, and Mark standing over him telling him he's a dead man. Mark, carrying Luke's body, is picked up by a truck with an unknown driver.

== Ratings ==
DVR Ratings for season 2 of The Following
Episode No.	Title	Original air date	DVR 18–49	DVR viewers (millions)	Total 18–49	Total viewers (millions)
1	"Resurrection"	January 19, 2014	1.2	3.06	5.6	14.24
2	"For Joe"	January 27, 2014	1.5	3.48	3.5	9.50
3	"Trust Me"	February 3, 2014	1.3	3.15	3.2	8.98
4	"Family Affair"	February 10, 2014	1.5	3.55	3.2	8.31
5	"Reflection"	February 17, 2014	1.4	3.32	3.1	8.51
6	"Fly Away"	February 24, 2014	1.2	3.03	2.8	7.64
7	"Sacrifice"	March 3, 2014	1.4	3.13	3.0	8.29
8	"The Messenger"	March 10, 2014	1.2	2.81	2.7	7.67
9	"Unmasked"	March 17, 2014	1.2	3.01	2.6	6.95
10	"Teacher's Pet"	March 24, 2014	1.4	3.29	2.8	7.36
11	"Freedom"	March 31, 2014	1.4	2.78	2.5	6.96
12	"Betrayal"	April 7, 2014	1.4	2.89	2.6	7.30
13	"The Reaping"	April 14, 2014	1.4	3.07	2.8	7.42
14	"Silence"	April 21, 2014	1.2	3.07	2.6	7.49
15	"Forgive"	April 28, 2014	1.0	2.77	2.5	7.28
