= Fly Away (The Following) =

- The Following episode
- Episode no.: Season 2 Episode 6
- Directed by: Rob Seidenglanz
- Written by: Dewayne Jones
- Production code: 2J7556
- Original air date: February 24, 2014

Guest appearances
- Valerie Cruz as Agent Gina Mendez; Camille De Pazzis as Giselle; Bambadjan Bamba as Sami; Rita Markova as Radmilla

Episode chronology
← Previous "Reflection"	Next → "Sacrifice"
- The Following (season 2)

"Fly Away" is the sixth episode of the second season of the psychological thriller television series The Following, which premiered on February 24, 2014, on Fox. The episode was written by Dewayne Jones and directed by Rob Seidenglanz.

== Summary ==
Mark knocks on Luke's door, who tries to keep Mark out saying that he and Gisele are exploring their friendship. Mark enters the room and discovers Gisele's dead body, as Luke reveals she was killed by Ryan Hardy.

Meanwhile, Agent Mendez and Weston discuss Weston's involvement with the case as she suggests he take some time off if needed. Back at the motel, Max helps Ryan patch up his wound from the fight with Luke. Ryan calls Weston and fills him in on what occurred, also suggesting he and the FBI come to Connecticut, where Max and Ryan believe Lily's group to be hiding out. Weston leaves to meet up with Max and Ryan alone.

After Lily and Joe spend the night together, Lily suggests to Joe that her family, Joe, Emma, and Mandy all go to her home in Venezuela. Joe hesitantly agrees. Ryan, Max, and Weston find Luke at a field near Lily's home. Weston hits Luke with a large piece of wood and they manage to handcuff and get him into their car, when Weston continues assaulting Luke with his fists as Luke tells Max that he'd enjoy killing her and doing things to her body. Ryan calls Lily and offers her a trade of her son Luke in exchange for Joe, to which Lily agrees.

Lily offers Joe a drink and begins to tell him of Ryan's proposed trade. As the conversation continues, Joe falls to the ground, as Lily drugged his drink. Lily informed her daughter Radmilla to kill Emma and Mandy if they cause any problems while her and Mark leave. Upon arrival, Lily leaves the car with a hostage wearing a Joe Carroll mask. After Weston slashed Lily's car tires, Max gives Luke up and Lily gives her hostage up and she runs off with her sons.

Back at Lily's house, Ryan attempts to find an open entrance. As he gets to a staircase, Lily's son Sami attacks Ryan, but Ryan stabs and kills him. Inside, Joe, Mandy, and Emma attempt to leave as Radmilla pulls a gun on them. Joe stabs her and the trio take off. Ryan enters the house and upon finding Radmilla in a pool of blood on the floor, spots Joe getting into a car through a window in the house. The car pulls off as Ryan runs outside of the house, unable to catch up in time.

Weston and Max eventually catch up with Luke as Lily and Mark jump into their car to leave. They watch Luke get shot twice but quickly drive off leaving Luke behind with Weston continuing to assault him, assuming it's likely too late to help him.

Joe, Emma, and Mandy race Lily and Mark to their airplane and get there first. Ryan and the FBI block off the plane from taking off but once they open the plane's door, only the pilot is inside who reveals that the trio quickly got off the plane after [Joe] got a phone call. Mendez reveals to Ryan that Max and Weston have both been released from their jobs. Ryan, Max, and Weston conclude that someone in the FBI must be feeding Joe information.

Back in the car, Emma gets a call from Lily, who tells Joe that Luke was killed. Joe replies saying he was never fond of Luke and that he is done with Lily and her family, sending Lily into an emotional breakdown.

== Reception ==
=== Critical response ===
Matt Fowler from IGN gave the episode a rating of 8.3, adding that the episode was "an exciting, arc-ending episode of The Following that now allows the series to start up a new storyline within the season." David Sims of The A.V. Club rated the episode a C−, stating "This episode was a ridiculous circus of carnage, with alliances falling apart, new ones being formed, and the FBI literally abandoning any hope of doing anything remotely competent this season."

=== Ratings ===
The episode received a 1.6 18–49 ratings share and was watched by 4.58 million viewers, a series low and decrease from the previous episode's series low of 1.7. The episode "Unmasked" would later take the spot as the series' lowest rated episode ever.
