= Betrayal (The Following) =

- The Following episode
- Episode no.: Season 2 Episode 12
- Directed by: Marcos Siega
- Written by: Lizzie Mickery
- Production code: 2J7562
- Original air date: April 7, 2014

Guest appearances
- Shane McRae as Robert; Sprague Grayden as Carrie Cooke; John Lafayette as Marshal Scott Turner; Felix Solis as Agent Clarke; Josh Salatin as Lucas; Mackenzie Marsh as Tilda; Liza De Weerd as Angela; Hannah Hodson as Frat Girl; Carter Jenkins as Preston; Tom Cavanagh as Kingston Tanner

Episode chronology
← Previous "Freedom"	Next → "The Reaping"
- The Following (season 2)

"Betrayal" is the twelfth episode of the second season of the psychological thriller television series The Following, which premiered on April 7, 2014, on Fox. It was written by Lizzie Mickery and directed by Marcos Siega.

== Summary ==
Ryan and Claire discuss what happened on the day Ryan was told Claire died. Ryan expresses his disbelief that Claire is actually there and Claire expresses her desire to have Joe dead.

Joe and Emma watch Kingston Tanner, a pastor, in an interview with Carrie where he calls Joe out for being the anti-Christ. Emma asks Joe if he believes in God and Joe says he doesn't. Joe also says he wants to teach Kingston a lesson. Carrie's car gets stuck in traffic behind a big truck. Four of Joe's followers, Angela, Robert, Lucas, and Tilda, attack Carrie's driver and body guard. Tilda hands Carrie a phone with Joe on the line, who informs her she must again broadcast a message of his, or he'll come after her and everyone she loves. Ryan asks Carrie to not broadcast the clip until he watches it, in case it's a message for Joe's followers.

Mandy is approached by two men at a random building. She pulls out a knife in fear but sees Mark, who tells her the men are there to ensure their safety. Mark asks Mandy where Joe is, but she refuses to tell him, saying Joe doesn't want anyone to know. Mark brings her home to Lily, who bakes Mandy chocolate cake as Mandy admires the house. Lily asks Mandy where Joe is and violently slaps her when she refuses to tell.

Claire and Ryan watch Joe's video, which turns out to be a threat to Kingston through bible quotes. They conclude that Joe is going to go after Kingston's son, Preston, who goes to college in Connecticut. Claire insists she go with Ryan and Ryan hesitantly agrees, but once at his car, sends Claire a text message saying "Sorry" and leaves with Mike, asking Max to introduce herself to Claire and keep her safe. Max lets Claire into the room where Ryan does his researching. Max tells Claire that Ryan fell apart after he thought Claire died. Claire says that she had to do what was best for her son, and Max says she only wants what's best for her uncle.

Angela, Robert, Lucas, and Tilda arrive at Preston's frat house. They're stopped by a security guard, but stab him in the back of their van. Along the drive to the college, Mike tries to explain what happened with Claire, but Ryan repeatedly tells him that it's okay. Tilda and Lucas enter the frat house and go up to Preston's room, where his roommate is making out with a girl while Preston isn't there. They kill the roommate and girl after the roommate repeatedly calls Tilda "fatty."

Robert and Lucas superglue masks to everyone's faces inside, and trap them in a room. Preston gets home with a girl and Tilda slits the girl's throat in front of Preston after he begs God to keep her alive. Ryan and Mike enter the frat house and find the room with the masked hostages. Lucas comes charging out of the room and Mike shoots him dead. Tilda, Robert, and Angela drive off with Preston as a hostage. Ryan gets into his car and follows them. Mike calls Ryan, who says he needs to end this by killing Joe and asks Mike to take care of Claire and Max, hanging up the phone before Mike can get another word in and eventually throwing his phone out of the window once he arrives at Korban.

Emma shows Joe surveillance footage of Mandy climbing over a gate and leaving. At Lily's, Mark and Luke burn Mandy's wrist over a candle's flame when she again refuses to tell where Joe is. Emma realizes that Mandy got one of Lily's numbers and must have gone to her. Joe calls Lily demanding Mandy be kept unharmed. Lily gives the phone to Mandy, who says she didn't tell them anything. Lily tells Joe he can come get Mandy in person or she will die. Joe tells Mandy he loves her, which she says back, and Joe hangs up the phone. Joe angrily tells Emma she should have tried harder to get close to Mandy, but Emma disagrees, saying he shouldn't have ever brought her, which visibly upsets Joe, who clearly is very angry at and blames Emma for Mandy's death. Lily, Mark, and Luke have dinner with Mandy's dead body sitting in a chair at the table.

Joe watches as Carrie broadcasts his video. Carrie then goes to Ryan's apartment and asks Mike and Max to talk to Ryan, apologizing for showing the video but saying she did so out of fear because Ryan never followed up about it. She says she only wants to help Ryan but Mike tells her that he's not there. Claire overhears the conversation and confronts Carrie, saying if she wants to help Ryan, she should help her.

Robert, Tilda, and Angela arrive back at Korban with Preston and Joe meets with them, none of them realizing that Ryan has followed them back and is now on Korban grounds.

== Reception ==
=== Critical response ===
Sonia Saraiya of The A.V. Club rated the episode a C+, saying "it’s an episode that is for once playing with some of the provocative concepts the show has introduced, instead of just letting them sit there to fester and putrefy." Dan Hajducky of Den of Geek gave the episode another mixed review, saying "'Betrayal' was like watching a friend handle a late-night summer bonfire when you have work the next morning: each time the flames settle, another log gets tossed into the pit, and you want to leave but it’s rude to not see the ordeal through to its end."

=== Ratings ===
The episode matches the previous episode's series low in ratings, earning a 1.4 18-49 ratings share, watched by 4.45 million people while up against the 2014 NCAA Men's Division I Basketball Tournament.
