= Teacher's Pet (The Following) =

- The Following episode
- Episode no.: Season 2 Episode 10
- Directed by: Marcos Siega
- Written by: Brett Mahoney
- Production code: 2J7560
- Original air date: March 24, 2014

Guest appearances
- John Lafayette as Marshal Scott Turner; Sprague Grayden as Carrie Cooke; Shane McRae as Robert; Emily Kinney as Mallory; Josh Salatin as Lucas; Theo Stockman as Patrick; Mackenzie Marsh as Tilda; Felix Solis as Agent Clarke; Gregg Henry as Dr. Strauss; Kristina Klebe as Carla; Pico Alexander as Young Joe Carroll

Episode chronology
← Previous "Unmasked"	Next → "Freedom"
- The Following (season 2)

"Teacher's Pet" is the tenth episode of the second season of the psychological thriller television series The Following, which premiered on March 24, 2014, on the Fox network. The episode was written by Brett Mahoney and directed by Marcos Siega.

== Summary ==
A flashback shows Claire Matthews in the hospital with Mike Weston as he and Scott Turner tell Claire that the only way to keep her safe is to lead everyone to believe she died, including Ryan Hardy, though she feels she has to tell Ryan the truth. Back in present day, Weston fills Claire in on everything that has gone on in the past year. Claire wants to kill Joe Carroll and insists on joining Weston in helping find Joe, but he advises her to stay in protection.

Robert brings Joe and Emma to meet up with Korban members that wish to help as Joe's messengers. He later meets with a bigger group of Korban members to spread some of his ideas and drill in his message of "no redemption without blood."

Agent Clarke brings Ryan to talk to Dr. Strauss, who's in custody. Strauss says he has no involvement with Lance but says Ryan is essentially a follower of Joe due to his obsession. Ryan calls Carrie Cooke and says he'd like to go on the record about the case. During her next TV broadcast, she announces that Strauss has been captured by the FBI and is fully cooperating. This brings Joe to call Jana. When he calls, Ryan answers and the FBI attempts to track Joe's phone to find a location, but they're unable to.

A flashback shows Joe when he was a student of Strauss'. Strauss says he understands that Joe was sent to America by his uncle after his parents both died in England. Strauss later brings Joe to a lab where a dead woman's body lies on a table as he continues mentoring Joe.

The group of Korban members sent as messengers (Robert, Mallory, Lucas, Patrick, and Tilda) gather on a street sidewalk. Tilda selects a random man across the street to be the victim as Lucas proceeds to stab him while whispering "no redemption without blood" and places a piece of paper with that phase on his clothes. The group next goes to a house where they select a family after seeing the father outside with a dog. They kill the father, his wife and their son and write the phrase on the wall in blood. Police and FBI later show up and determine the murders were done at random.

Back at Korban, Joe strangles a cat in front of another group of Korban members as he further explains his ideas. Joe allows anybody feeling uncomfortable to go off and take some time to think after a member, Carla, says that killing is not "their ways." Mandy joins that group as they leave. Later, Emma finds Mandy and tells her that everyone who walked out was put into Korban's underground cell, but Mandy was spared as Joe instructed them to give her another chance. Mandy confronts Emma, believing her to be jealous over Joe thinking she's special. The two separate after a brief argument.

Mallory and Patrick go to the restaurant that Mallory was previously fired from and Mallory picks her victim. Max tells Ryan that FBI facial recognition identified Mallory. Ryan pieces together an earlier clue from Joe and goes with Weston to the restaurant. Mallory follows her target to the bathroom and pulls her knife, but the woman fights back and runs out of the bathroom only to be grabbed by Patrick and held hostage as the FBI and police raid the restaurant. Ryan tries convincing Mallory to give up information on where Joe is. She drops her knife but Patrick gives up the hostage and slits Mallory's throat before she's able to give any information away. Patrick is then shot dead. Back at Korban, Joe anoints Tilda and Lucas after they return from their mission by slitting his arm and smearing his blood on their foreheads.

Carrie shows up at Ryan's apartment and tries to convince Ryan that he saved people at the restaurant and also showed her a bit of trust before the two fool around in Ryan's bed.

Claire tells Scott Turner that she's not going to Arizona, where witness protection wants to move her, because she wants to see Ryan Hardy.

== Reception ==
=== Critical response ===
Sonia Saraiya of The A.V. Club rated the episode a D, saying "It’s the subtext of the show that makes my skin crawl." Dan Hajducky of Den of Geek gave the episode another positive review, saying "This week’s episode sends the rapidly evolving plot flying forward, while also giving us the long-awaited origin story of Joe Carroll." Another positive review came from Mark Trammell of TV Equals. stating about the plot "we saw how being a cult leader of a religious sect maybe wasn’t as far off the mark as one might think."

=== Ratings ===
The episode received the largest post air-date 18–49 rating percent increase from DVR viewings, bringing the ratings up 88% compared to the shows it competed with on its premiere night.
