= Freedom (The Following) =

- The Following episode
- Episode no.: Season 2 Episode 11
- Directed by: Liz Friedlander
- Written by: Dewayne Jones
- Production code: 2J7561
- Original air date: March 31, 2014

Guest appearances
- Shane McRae as Robert; Sprague Grayden as Carrie Cooke; John Lafayette as Captain Turner; Felix Solis as Agent Clarke; Tom Patrick Stephens as Decklan; Florence Faivre as Serena; Josh Salatin as Lucas; Mackenzie Marsh as Tilda; Tom Cavanagh as Kingston Tanner

Episode chronology
← Previous "Teacher's Pet"	Next → "Betrayal"
- The Following (season 2)

"Freedom" is the eleventh episode of the second season of the psychological thriller television series The Following, which premiered on March 31, 2014, on Fox. The episode was written by Dewayne Jones and directed by Liz Friedlander.

== Summary ==
At Korban, Joe has a gathering with some Korban followers and asks for a volunteer. A woman, Angela, steps up and Joe reveals a woman, Carla, strapped to a table and instructs Angela to stab Carla, "sending her home." Joe and Emma later discuss Mandy, as Emma feels she is a lost cause. Mandy listens to the conversation from outside of their door.

Robert joins Joe and Emma and questions Joe about why he selected Carla to be killed, also informing him that Korban members are beginning to question Joe because they miss Micah and are aware of Joe's past. Robert apologizes for bringing the subject up in the first place after Joe calms his nerves. Emma follows Robert back to his room and tries to further ensure he has no doubts. She seduces him throughout the conversation and the two eventually hook up.

Ryan watches a news report showing that a fan club for Joe has begun, not of violence but of admiration. Mike and Ryan research possible cult connections and information on Lily Gray while briefly discussing each other's personal lives. Meanwhile, Claire continues requesting to see Ryan. She is given a proposition, allowing her to see Ryan on the conditions that her son and mother are moved to an undisclosed location that she will not know unless she returns to witness protection.

Two masked men enter a bakery and begin stabbing customers and employees at random before running out the back door. When Ryan and the FBI show up, Ryan notices that no message has been left at the crime scene like previous attacks sent by Joe. Later as a nurse, Terri Burke, is getting into her car, she is stabbed by a woman, Serena. Serena takes Terri's identification card and clothes to enter the hospital where the victims from the bakery attack are being treated. She drops off a bag into a locker in an employee room. Two men who were stabbed in the attack leave their hospital beds and retrieve the bag, revealing guns inside. Serena goes to see Luke and hands him a phone with Lily on the line. Lily tells Luke to follow all of Serena's instructions so that she can bring Luke home.

A man, Decklan, wheels his partner on a gurney into the area where Luke is being kept, where they shoot security members dead. Serena leads Luke out of the room and Decklan takes him from there. The FBI shows up before they're able to escape. Mike checks IDs of a few hospital workers. Serena is in the group and hesitates to show her ID and tries to stab Mike, but is shot dead when she refuses to give information on Lily and again pulls a knife on Mike. Another of Lily's men is waiting in an ambulance for Decklan to bring Luke to, but the FBI corner the ambulance and shoot the driver dead. Ryan finds Luke and Decklan in a back room and Decklan puts a gun to Ryan's head. Ryan escapes and shoots Decklan dead as Luke runs away and escapes through a market.

Carrie shows up at the market to briefly meet up with Ryan. She then goes on air for the story about Lily's arranged attack and rescue mission, which Joe and Emma watch. Meanwhile, Mandy packs her bag and leaves Korban. She is picked up by a local cop and calls Mark, whose number she got online.

Ryan assures Mike that they will find Lily and Joe and eventually live a normal life. The two return to Ryan's apartment and there is a knock at the door. Mike sees Claire and runs over to Ryan, saying he can explain everything. The door opens and Ryan stares at Claire in complete shock.

== Reception ==
=== Critical response ===
Sonia Saraiya of The A.V. Club rated the episode a C, saying "I have hit upon the best way to watch The Following: fast-forwarded and on mute." Dan Hajducky of Den of Geek gave the episode a mixed review, saying "'Freedom' may serve as a pin to be knocked down by the finale, but everyone knows how boring watching the pins being set up can be." Starlee Kine of Vulture gave the episode a more negative review, saying "The show has gone so far off the rails that next week I’m pretty sure that Joe and Lily are just going to have their people stab every character to death halfway through and we’ll be watching an empty room for 30 minutes."

=== Ratings ===
The episode received a 1.4/4 18–49 ratings share and was watched by 4.17 million viewers.
