= Sacrifice (The Following) =

- The Following episode
- Episode no.: Season 2 Episode 7
- Directed by: Adam Davidson
- Written by: Scott Reynolds
- Production code: 2J7557
- Original air date: March 4, 2014

Guest appearances
- Valerie Cruz as Agent Gina Mendez; Lee Tergesen as Kurt; Shane McRae as Robert; Jake Weber as Micah; Susan Heyward as Hannah; Montego Glover as Agent Lawrence; Jacinda Barrett as Julia

Episode chronology
← Previous "Fly Away"	Next → "The Messenger"
- The Following (season 2)

"Sacrifice" is the seventh episode of the second season of the psychological thriller television series The Following, which premiered on March 4, 2014, on Fox. The episode was written by Scott Reynolds and directed by Adam Davidson.

== Summary ==
Joe, Emma, and Mandy pull up to a closed gate. Joe explains that Roderick, Joe's former right-hand, once referred him to this group. As trucks pull up, a crew of men with guns surround the trio and two seemingly authority-like figures step out. The woman, Julia, tells them to drop to their knees and put their hands behind their back. Emma and Mandy seem nervous but Joe encourages them to follow along. They get handcuffed and blindfolded as Julia and the man, Robert, lead them into one of the trucks.

Ryan meets with Agent Mendez who asks if Ryan has any ideas who in the FBI may be leaking information to Joe, suggesting she's finding it hard to trust anybody anymore. Ryan uses that idea against her, and walks out claiming he doesn't know if he can trust her. On his way out, he runs into Weston who says he is leaving to go home. Despite Ryan trying to make him stay, Weston has his mind made up, as he feels too mentally unstable to continue working on the case after lashing out on Luke. He tells Ryan that his dad won't talk to him because he doesn't understand Weston's instability.

Max tells Ryan that she was suspended from her job for six months. She attempts to convince Ryan to leave the hunt for Joe behind in favor of picking his life back up, returning to teaching, and living a normal life with his new family (Max). Ryan admits his obsession with Joe is what led him to teach, because he knew it would aggravate Joe, and that the only way he'll be happy is if he kills Joe himself.

Max pulls into a parking garage and witnesses a father and son getting into a physical disagreement. She walks over to them, insisting the father back off. The father knocks her out as the son records the scene. The father brings Max to a room where he ties her up by her hands, leaving her dangling from the ceiling. After Ryan gets a copy of the little boy's video on his phone, he brings it to the FBI. Weston returns to assist in finding Max.

Julia informs Joe that someone wants to meet with him. Joe meets Micah, the cult's leader. Joe offers his help with the cult in exchange for a place to stay. Later, Julia gives Joe a lie detector test to ensure his reasoning for being there is genuine. Afterwards, Julia informs Micah that Joe's intents are in-fact genuine.

Mendez allows Ryan entry to speak to Luke, who is in custody and recovering from Weston's assault, to try to gain information on the man who kidnapped Max. Luke identifies the man as Kurt, aka "the Huntsman," a serial killer known for killing women, usually prostitutes. Luke notes that Kurt had once hoped to romance Lily and will do anything for her, with the implication that he has abducted Max at Lily's request. The FBI enters Kurt's home and recognize his son from the video. After handcuffing him to get information, they find the address of where Kurt is. Max attacks Kurt and is able to run away into the woods, though Kurt chases after her. The FBI shows up and their police dogs lead them to Max and Kurt. Max sees Weston and calls him over as Kurt prepares to shoot them both from a distance. Before he is able to, he is shot dead.

Joe, Emma, and Mandy are taken to a ceremony. Micah explains that offering the blood of one of their cult members will wash away the group's sins and bring them a step closer to "going home." He also says that the selection will be "through God's will" as Julia runs through the seating area shaking a stick as though God is leading her to the selected individual, eventually stopping with her stick pointed at Emma. Emma is strapped to a post as she begs Joe for help, though Joe remains in his seat as Micah enforces that they all must trust each other. Micah slits Emma's wrists as her blood drips into a funnel, ending in a cup. Micah drinks the blood as Emma passes out. Julia informs Joe that Emma lived through the ceremony; Joe tells Julia he knows they targeted him by hurting Emma.

Ryan receives a video from Lily; Mendez instructs they put it on a big screen in the FBI's office. Lily begins addressing Ryan and Weston soon recognizes the inside of his house in the background. He quickly demands a crew heads to his home to ensure his fathers safety. However, the video turns to Mark, then down to Weston's father strapped in a chair as Mark slits his throat and kills him. Weston's face fills with hysterical tears as he runs out of the room. Ryan catches up to him and holds him as he weeps outside of the FBI's building.

== Reception ==
=== Critical response ===
Sonia Saraiya of The A.V. Club rated the episode a D+, stating "the usually talented Kevin Bacon and James Purefoy, are phoning it in so hard that I’d be surprised if they’re even reading the scripts—they don’t even seem to know what’s happening in each scene." Sydney Bucksbaum of Zap2it gave the episode a more positive review, stating about the new cult, "Although The Following has been about a cult of psychopathic murderers since day one, this is taking things to a whole new level."

=== Ratings ===
The episode received a 1.7 18–49 ratings share and was watched by 5.14 million viewers, an increase from the previous episode's series low of 1.6 and 4.58 million viewers.
