= The Following season 3 =

Season of television series

The Following
- Season 3
- DVD cover
- No. of episodes: 15

Release
- Original network: Fox
- Original release: March 2 – May 18, 2015

Season chronology
- ← Previous; Season 2

The third and final season of the Fox American television psychological thriller series The Following premiered on March 2, 2015 and concluded on May 18, 2015 with a total of 15 episodes.

== Cast ==
=== Main cast ===
- Kevin Bacon as Ryan Hardy, a former FBI agent (15 episodes)
- Shawn Ashmore as Mike Weston, a young FBI agent (15 episodes)
- Jessica Stroup as Max Hardy, a young FBI agent and Ryan Hardy's niece (15 episodes)
- Sam Underwood as Mark Gray, follower and son of deceased Lily Gray and identical twin of deceased Luke (9 episodes)
- Zuleikha Robinson as Gwen, love interest of Ryan Hardy (15 episodes)
- Gregg Henry as Dr. Arthur Strauss, Joe Carroll's mentor who introduced him into killing (4 episodes)
- Michael Ealy as Theo Noble (10 episodes)
- James Purefoy as Joe Carroll, a serial killer and cult leader on death row (9 episodes)

=== Recurring ===
- Ruth Kearney as Daisy (11 episodes)
- Gbenga Akinnagbe as Tom Reyes, Max's boyfriend (10 episodes)
- Monique Gabriela Curnen as Erin Sloan, an FBI tech analyst (10 episodes)
- Valerie Cruz as Agent Mendez, lead FBI agent (7 episodes)
- Diane Neal as FBI Agent Lisa Campbell (5 episodes)
- Hunter Parrish as Kyle (5 episodes)
- Megalyn Echikunwoke as Penny Tyler, Theo's sister (5 episodes)
- Mike Colter as Nick Donovan, a returning FBI agent who assumes command of the FBI team (3 episodes)
- Susan Kelechi Watson as Cindy Noble, Theo's wife (3 episodes)
- Annet Mahendru as Eliza (4 episodes)

=== Guest stars ===
- Kristen Bush as Dawn McClane, Mendez's wife (3 episodes)
- Felix Solis as Agent Clarke, FBI Director (2 episodes)
- Michael Irby as Andrew, follower of Mark (2 episodes)
- Glenn Fleshler as Neil, former student of Dr. Strauss (2 episodes)
- Robin Weigert as Judge Wallace (2 episodes)
- Tim Guinee as Duncan Banks (2 episodes)
- David Furr as Tucker (2 episodes)
- Allison Mack as Hillary, a local police officer who assists the FBI (1 episode)
- David Pittu as Eldon (1 episode)

== Episodes ==
No. overall	No. in season	Title	Directed by	Written by	Original release date	Prod. code	US viewers (millions)
31	1	"New Blood"	Marcos Siega	Alexi Hawley & Brett Mahoney	March 2, 2015	3J5301	4.86
One year on from the Season 2 ending and Joe Caroll is on Death Row facing execution. Ryan is attempting to move on with his life and is in a relationship with a woman named Gwen. When the FBI discover three bodies in a hotel room with a message that says 'Ryan Hardy Lies', he learns that Mark Gray has re-emerged. Concerned for Gwen's safety, Ryan attempts to break off their relationship but she refuses. They learn that Mark now has followers and that they are recreating the scenes in which Mark's family members were killed.
32	2	"Boxed In"	Rob Seidenglanz	Barry O'Brien	March 9, 2015	3J5302	3.51
Mark's followers abduct the FBI Agent Jeffrey Clarke and attempt to kill his wife Anna; Mark then makes contact with the FBI and gives them a deadline of 8 p.m. to tell the truth about what happened to Lily Gray. Rather than visit Joe in prison, Ryan visits Dr. Arthur Strauss to learn more about Andrew and his motives. When Jeffrey escapes from Mark's followers, he makes contact with Ryan and the FBI trace the call to Reading, Pennsylvania. Now recaptured, Jeffrey is forced to make a confession about the FBI's misconduct under duress on a live internet stream. Ryan, Max and Weston find his body in a box.
33	3	"Exposed"	Gary Love	Brynn Malone	March 16, 2015	3J5303	3.53
Ryan attends a press conference to deny the allegations made by Clarke. He explains to the reporters that Clarke's confession was made under duress and that Mark Gray and his followers were responsible for his death. Kyle and Daisy have their doubts about remaining with Mark when Ryan reveals a sketch of them to the press and reaches out to them to make contact. Kyle and Daisy meet with Julianna, who tells them to stay with Mark and gives them a file on Max Hardy, which contains her address and alarm codes. Meanwhile, Mark abducts two reporters; he kills one of them and forces the other to interview him so he can tell his side of the story; when the reporter attempts to escape, Daisy kills her. Ryan, Max and Weston learn that the man responsible for killing Clarke is called Neil and locate him using his father, who suffers from dementia and wears a GPS tracker. Neil draws his gun on Ryan but Max fatally shoots him. That evening, Kyle and Daisy plant cameras in Max's apartment.
34	4	"Home"	Nicole Kassell	Jeff Eckerle & Marilyn Osborn	March 23, 2015	3J5304	3.93
Mark and his followers attack a fire station, killing the people inside. The next day, Daisy and Kyle inadvertently lead the FBI to Mark when they're caught on camera; Mark evades capture and desperately calls Daisy, who ignores his calls, leaving Mark suspicious that Daisy was helping the FBI. After investigating the house, Ryan, Max and Weston realize that Daisy and Kyle's next target is the daughter of a judge involved in the Strauss trial. They make their way to the campus to find that Kyle and Daisy have taken her to the rooftop and intend to throw her over, making it appear to be a suicide attempt. Daisy attacks Weston but he is soon saved, while rescuing the girl, Ryan manages to shoot Kyle in the shoulder. Realizing that Kyle is seriously injured, Daisy calls Mark for help and is given an address to go to.
35	5	"A Hostile Witness"	Marcos Siega	Michael McGrale	March 23, 2015	3J5305	3.75
Ryan works out that all the events thus far were solely aimed at discrediting the FBI in order to influence the outcome of Strauss' trial. Daisy and an injured Kyle are reunited with Mark but their main focus is to safely escape from him. Mark realizes that Kyle and Daisy have just been using him. Kyle and Daisy's next target is the journalist Carrie Cooke, who is a key witness at the trial. Carrie is kidnapped and killed, which results in the case against Strauss being dismissed. The FBI catch up with Kyle but are too late to stop the dismissal of the trial and Strauss has been set free. Ryan, Max and Weston are to be suspended unless they can prove Daisy's link to Strauss by morning. Daisy meets with Strauss and tries to attack him, blaming him for Kyle's death. Meanwhile, the FBI team finds the address and locate Daisy and Strauss. Mike leaves Max alone with Strauss to pursue Mark who escapes. Daisy attacks Max, and then frees Strauss and flees. The episode ends with Ryan visiting Joe in prison.
36	6	"Reunion"	Mary Harron	Brett Mahoney	March 30, 2015	3J5306	3.28
Ryan visits Joe Carroll in prison to ask him to help find Arthur Strauss. Joe agrees to help only if Ryan will agree to visit him regularly until his execution. Joe suggests that they look into Strauss' former pupils and any he may go to for help. The FBI find themselves in Beacon, NY where there has been an unusually high number of missing persons. The local sheriff isn't interested in helping the team. However, the deputy is far more welcoming. In the meantime, Strauss is hiding in a cabin in the woods awaiting the arrival of Theo, a former pupil who excelled. Theo greets Strauss warmly, but then murders him while Daisy watches. Ryan, Mike and the sheriff find the cabin and discover Strauss dead.
37	7	"The Hunt"	Sylvain White	Liz Sczudlo	April 6, 2015	3J5307	2.95
There is a week remaining until Carroll's execution and Ryan visits him again hoping to learn who Strauss' 'favorite student' was. Joe tells him that Strauss kept all his students isolated from one another in order to keep them dependent on him; with few exceptions, the killers don't know who each other are. Theo rescues Duncan Banks, killing two US Marshals in the process. The FBI trace the fake passports they found on Strauss to a government employee, Luis, but Theo and Duncan want to get to Luis before the FBI do. Max is cleared to return to duty. Tucker is taken hostage by the hacker. Donovan, who replaced Gina, assumes Tucker is the hacker and orders the team to find him asap. Theo returns home to reveal he has a wife and kids. Hardy begins to dream of Joe.
38	8	"Flesh & Blood"	Marcos Siega	Mary Leah Sutton	April 13, 2015	3J5308	3.46
Mike and Ryan begin working on finding Theo only to be stopped by Donovan. After finding a house with Theo's stuff, they learn he is still out there. A friend of Theo's wife invites them to a party only for Theo's wife's friend to reveal she is aware of some of Theo's activities. This causes Theo to kill her and her husband. Joe invites Ryan to his execution only to be rejected. After discovering the murder, Ryan and Mike discover Theo's location and real name through his wife. However, Theo discovers this and kills his wife and leaves his children drugged. After escaping, he contacts Ryan and vows to ruin his life.
39	9	"Kill the Messenger"	David Tuttman	Barry O'Brien	April 20, 2015	3J5309	3.41
Ryan and Theo are both led back to Joe for different reasons. Joe promises Ryan information about Theo but the latter refuses to talk to him. Theo recruits a former soldier to talk to Joe about some information on some codes he has, but Joe kills the soldier and secretly takes his sunglasses. Elsewhere, Max and Weston trace the stolen laptop, but it is destroyed by Tom. Mark, now having a dual personality with "Luke" as his guidance, closes in on Daisy. They reach a compromise to use her laptop in the FBI to their advantage. Everything occurring sends Ryan to almost consuming alcohol again but he refrains. Gwen is revealed to be pregnant.
40	10	"Evermore"	David McWhirter	Alexi Hawley	April 27, 2015	3J5310	3.46
It's Joe Carroll's execution day and Ryan is determined to free himself. Using the sunglasses he has fashioned into a weapon, Joe kills his guards and takes three hostages. He addresses the horrified FBI and demands that Ryan comes to him or the hostages will be killed. Ryan persuades Joe to let one hostage go before he is handcuffed and tazered. Meanwhile, Theo brings his sister to the apartment and briefs her on the situation. He hacks into the prison's security network and watches Joe and Ryan. With Joe threatening to remove one of the hostage's eyes, Ryan admits Joe is in his dreams and that he gets satisfaction from killing. Joe embraces Ryan and unties and uncuffs him; Ryan then punches Joe, who surrenders control. On leaving the cell, Theo's sister hacks into the system and releases the death row inmates. Ryan, the two hostages and Joe are overwhelmed. Finally, when Ryan has defeated the inmates, the FBI break in and take control. Joe's execution goes ahead with Ryan watching him die tearfully. The episode ends with Ryan drinking at a bar, imagining that it is Joe sharing a drink with him.
41	11	"Demons"	Marcos Siega	Dave Johnson	May 4, 2015	3J5311	3.22
Ryan feels the aftereffects of his late night drinking of having slept with a random woman. He confesses this to Gwen, who leaves him knowing how unstable he has become. He drinks to drown his sorrows. Theo and Penny visit a wealthy yet sadistic resort for killing; the head of which, Eliza, can help them escape but only if Theo kills Ryan. Ryan works together with agent Lisa Campbell to dig into Theo's past and learn that, as a 10 year old, he had someone murder his family. They track the killer down only to discover that his step-sister Sophia (Penny's real name) assisted him, calling Theo a demon. Mark and Daisy track down a hacker to discover Tom's betrayal and reach out for Theo's help. Tom continues to hide his guilt but after agent Sloan discovers his lies, she is inadvertently killed by Tom during a struggle.
42	12	"The Edge"	Nicole Kassell	Jeff Eckerle & Marilyn Osborn	May 11, 2015	3J5312	3.21
Theo goes to meet Daisy and Mark, who reveal there is a corrupt FBI agent on the inside and that they intend to work together. Theo agrees but only on his terms. He goes to meet with Eliza, who has ordered a hit on him but Theo kills her men. Ryan and the team work on the recent information and discover a location that may be a hiding spot for Theo and Sophia. Meanwhile, Tom tries to get rid of all evidence of the cameras in Max's apartment and the dead body of agent Sloan, only to be caught by Mark and Daisy, who blackmail him. Theo goes to see Eliza, who gives in and agrees to give him a way to disappear with his sister. Ryan and Max find Sophia, but Ryan brings her to his apartment; with thoughts of Joe influencing him, Ryan tortures Sophia. Max discovers Tom's betrayal; Tom is forced to deliver Mike to Mark, where Tom is killed upon their arrival. Theo forces Mark to let Mike live in order to make a trade with Ryan for his sister.
43	13	"A Simple Trade"	Marcos Siega	Liz Sczudlo & Mary Leah Sutton	May 11, 2015	3J5313	3.07
Ryan agrees to Theo's trade and brings Max up to date on his actions. The FBI find their location and learn of Tom's betrayal. Mike attempts to escape, but is cornered by Mark. Not trusting him anymore, Daisy shoots Mark in his shoulder and he flees. Theo has the trade take place at a theater intending to kill them all but Max stops Daisy. As they make their escape, Penny refuses to leave without making Ryan pay. She goes back to kill him but is killed herself in the process; Theo manages to escape with Daisy. Ryan returns home to talk to Gwen, who finally tells him she is pregnant. This gets through to Ryan and he goes an Alcoholics Anonymous meeting. Max and Mike reaffirm their love for each other, only to be ambushed by Mark, who stabs Mike in the back four times. As he goes to kill Max, Mike uses what strength he can muster and shoots Mark dead. Max tearfully tries to save Mike and calls for help.
44	14	"Dead or Alive"	Rob Seidenglanz	Brynn Malone & Michael McGrale	May 18, 2015	3J5314	3.13
Mike is rushed to the hospital where he undergoes surgery. Gwen is called for protection upon Ryan's request and gives him her ultrasound. Theo talks with Eliza, who promises him a way to leave the country when Ryan is dead. Ryan briefly meets Eliza at her hotel, after which she becomes paranoid and requests that Ryan be kept alive. Theo and Daisy kidnap Mendez and her family, forcing Ryan to meet him. Knowing of the trap, Ryan sets up a perimeter around the house. Mendez escapes with her spouse but is shot by Daisy. Max arrives and gives chase to Daisy and guns her down. Theo wounds FBI Agent Barton and traps Ryan when he arrives.
45	15	"The Reckoning"	Marcos Siega	Brett Mahoney & Alexi Hawley	May 18, 2015	3J5315	3.05
After torturing Ryan, Theo kills Agent Barton for payback against Sophia. Mike awakens at the hospital and Max informs Lisa of Theo's location, who is revealed to be a mole for Eliza. Max and Lisa follow Theo's trail, only to find a dead end. Eliza finds Theo and has her men torture him, while she interrogates Ryan on what he knows about her. While the latter knows nothing of her, she doesn't believe him and threatens to kill everyone he knows. Ryan and Theo escape, to which Theo learns of Gwen's pregnancy. He intends to raise the child as his own, and cause as much damage as possible to the child. He forces Lisa to assist him, then wounds her and kidnaps Gwen. A chase ensues; Ryan shoots Theo in the head and saves Gwen. However, Theo survives and he and Ryan fall over a waterfall. While Theo's status is unknown, Ryan fakes his death and visits Lisa in the hospital, aware of her betrayal. He questions her about Eliza, then slips out of her room as her monitor alarm sounds, apparently having killed her. Finally, he observes Gwen and Max with Mike in his hospital room and departs secretly, intent on taking down Eliza and her group.

== Ratings ==
DVR Ratings for season 3 of The Following
Episode No.	Title	Original air date	DVR 18–49	DVR viewers (millions)	Total 18–49	Total viewers
1	"New Blood"	March 2, 2015	1.1	3.08	2.7	7.94
2	"Boxed In"	March 9, 2015	1.2	2.92	2.3	6.43
3	"Exposed"	March 16, 2015	1.1	2.73	2.2	6.26
4	"Home"	March 23, 2015	—N/a	—N/a	—N/a	—N/a
5	"A Hostile Witness"	March 23, 2015	0.8	—N/a	2.0	—N/a
6	"Reunion"	March 30, 2015	0.7	—N/a	1.8	—N/a
7	"The Hunt"	April 6, 2015	1.1	2.68	2.0	5.62
8	"Flesh & Blood"	April 13, 2015	0.9	2.32	2.0	5.78
9	"Kill The Messenger"	April 20, 2015	0.9	2.31	2.1	5.71
10	"Evermore"	April 27, 2015	0.8	2.32	2.0	5.78
11	"Demons"	May 4, 2015	0.9	2.41	2.0	5.63
12	"The Edge"	May 11, 2015	0.7	—N/a	1.7	—N/a
13	"A Simple Trade"	May 11, 2015	0.7	—N/a	1.7	—N/a
14	"Dead or Alive"	May 18, 2015	—N/a	—N/a	—N/a	—N/a
15	"The Reckoning"	May 18, 2015	0.7	2.05	1.6	5.10
