= Resurrection (The Following) =

- The Following episode
- Episode no.: Season 2 Episode 1
- Directed by: Marcos Siega
- Written by: Kevin Williamson
- Production code: 2J7551
- Original air date: January 19, 2014

Guest appearances
- Valerie Cruz as Agent Gina Mendez; Camille De Pazzis as Giselle; James McDaniel as Agent Phillips; Keith Carradine as Barry; Tehmina Sunny as Melissa Evans; J.D. Williams as Carlos; Carrie Preston as Judy; Haley Higgins as Heather Clarke; Susan Heyward as Hannah

Episode chronology
| ← Previous "The Final Chapter" | Next → "For Joe" |
- The Following (season 2)

"Resurrection" is the first episode of the second season of the psychological thriller television series The Following, which premiered on January 19, 2014, on Fox. The episode was written by the series' creator Kevin Williamson and directed by Marcos Siega.

== Summary ==
The episode starts off immediately from "The Final Chapter" as Molly stabs Claire again in the chest. Ryan, gaining what strength he can, grabs Molly from behind her hair and strangles her to the ground and breaks her neck, killing her. He manages to get an ambulance to his apartment and he and Claire are rushed to a hospital. After Ryan is out of surgery, he is greeted by Mike and when he questions what happened to Claire, Mike informs him that Claire died, leaving Ryan devastated.

A year after the anniversary of the supposed death of Joe Carroll, individuals wearing masks of Carroll's face appear on a New York City Subway car and stab everyone on the train to death, except one woman, who escapes after being stabbed in the arm once. During the attack, they screamed phrases such as "Joe Carroll lives", "Resurrection", and "Ryan Hardy can't stop us".

Ryan Hardy, now sober and healthy, and living in New York City and teaching college students, shows up to work and is met by FBI agents. They bring him to the FBI's main office to see if he can be of any help.

Agent Phillips shows up at the home of Mike Weston, who was suspended by the Office of Professional Responsibility and is awaiting a hearing. Phillips tells Weston to come to New York to consult on the Subway murders case. Weston is brought to the crime scene where he meets Agent Gina Mendez, the head of the case. Back at the FBI's office, Weston runs into Ryan and has a flashback of a few months ago where the two of them were at a bar with tension between the two as Weston coached Ryan on what to say about why they killed a man the day Agent Debra Parker died. In present day, Ryan, Weston, Mendez, and Phillips question the woman who escaped the subway attacks, Lily Gray, who has no answers on who the attackers were.

A young man, Luke, and woman, Heather Clarke, make eye contact in the hallway of a hotel. He brings her to a room and kills her, likely by strangling her as bruises are shown on her neck. He proceeds to play music and dance with Heather's dead body with the majority of her clothing removed. Heather is later found on a park bench, set up in a white dress.

Weston and Mendez begin searching for information on possible suspects for the murders and only identify one person, Carlos, who has been missing for over a year. Weston suggests to Ryan that the previous cult has sparked back up and recruited new members, but Hardy seems uninterested and leaves. Back at his house, he enters a passcode-locked room with pictures and files from the case of Carroll's cult pinned all over the walls. Max Hardy, Ryan's niece, arrives at Ryan's house to investigate the situation further with him, as she looks up information on Carlos. They find his address through Max's New York Police Department computer software; Ryan heads to the house despite Max suggestion he instead hand the information over to the FBI and stop the private investigating the two had been up to.

Ryan arrives at Carlos' house and attacks him before questioning him at gunpoint. He asks where Joe is, and Carlos says he hasn't seen Joe since the night of his supposed death at the lighthouse; Carlos had picked him up and helped him escape the scene, despite the FBI being fully convinced they'd identified they body they found as Joe's. Carlos manages to escape, but Ryan chases after him and is hit by a car in the street, though he gets up and continues his chase. Carlos runs to another hotel room where a woman, Gisele, answers the door and lets him in. Ryan runs into the hotel, passing by Emma Hill without noticing.

Ryan continues to tell Weston he knows nothing and acts like he has no interest in the case. Frustrated, Weston asked Ryan why he had ignored all of his calls and messages in the past year while Weston was struggling with after-thoughts of the case. Ryan fails to provide an answer again and walks off. Ryan later returns to Lily's hospital room to check in with her and apologize for the incident, believing it to be his fault that she was attacked.

Back at the hotel, Luke and Mark show up and question Carlos about the subway murders. Carlos assures they have nothing to worry about. Luke proceeds to backhand Carlos' throat. Emma returns to her apartment where she lives with Hannah and other former Carroll cult members who were never found by the FBI.

A young girl, Mandy Lang, screams to a man named "Daryl" to come look at the news report on television about the subway murders. "Daryl" walks into the house, revealed to be Joe Carroll.

== Reception ==
=== Ratings ===
The episode's ratings reached a series high and was watched by 11.18 million and earned an 18-49 rating/share of 4.4/12. Including DVR viewership, the episode was watched by a total of 14.24 million viewers, and attained an 18-49 of 5.6.
