= Forgive (The Following) =

- The Following episode
- Episode no.: Season 2 Episode 15
- Directed by: Marcos Siega
- Written by: Kevin Williamson
- Production code: 2J7565
- Original air date: April 28, 2014

Guest appearances
- Felix Solis as Agent Clarke; Mackenzie Marsh as Tilda; Carter Jenkins as Preston; Connor Fox as Jason; Michael Robertson as Tim

Episode chronology
← Previous "Silence"	Next → "New Blood"
- The Following (season 2)

"Forgive" is the fifteenth and final episode of the second season of the psychological thriller television series The Following, which premiered on April 28, 2014, on the network Fox. It was written by Kevin Williamson and directed by Marcos Siega.

Upon airing, the finale was watched by 4.81 million American viewers, marking an increase in ratings from the previous episode, but down significantly from the first season finale.

== Plot ==
The shot fired at the end of the previous episode was aimed at Preston, which kills him, with Joe saying that he could not take his whining. Mike then cries in agony.

Ryan calls Claire, but Luke answers her phone and instructs Ryan to bring Joe, alive, to him or Claire will die. Ryan informs Joe of Luke's threat and helps Joe escape the church before the police can break in and arrest him. With Joe in the back seat and Mike and Max following behind, Ryan drives to the address given by Luke while the FBI shut the lights inside the church and proceed to shoot and kill all of Joe's followers inside. Along the way, one of Joe's followers, Tim, crashes into Ryan's car, flipping it with Ryan and Joe inside, injuring both men. Joe thanks and then shoots Tim and puts Ryan into Tim's car and continues the drive.

Outside the house, Ryan and Joe find letters inviting them inside for dinner. Once inside, they find Claire right before one of the twins drops a smoke bomb, putting Ryan, Joe, and Claire to sleep. They wake up at a table where Mark and Luke interrogate Ryan and Joe, threatening to kill Claire if they don't cooperate. Mike and Max show up and Mike shoots at Luke through a window while Joe cuts himself free. After everyone splits, Mike finds Mark and tells him that he killed Lily, not Ryan. Luke knocks Mike down but Max shoots Luke dead. Mark picks up Luke's body and runs off while a confrontation between Joe and Claire leads to Ryan putting Joe at gunpoint as Joe begs Ryan to kill him. Ryan, however, chooses not to shoot Joe and has Mike call Agent Clarke to have Joe arrested.

Ryan suggests to Claire that he pack a bag and move to Claire's home with her and Joey but Claire tells him that they need to move on separately so she can give her son a normal life. Mike admits to Max that he would have killed Joe before the two share a kiss.

That night, Ryan has a nightmare where he finds Luke's dead body lying in bed next to him, and Mark standing over him telling him he's a dead man. The episode and season ends with Mark, carrying Luke's body, being picked up by a truck with an unknown driver.

== Reception ==
The finale was watched by 4.81 million American viewers, and received an 18-49 rating/share of 1.5/4, up slightly from the previous episode, but down significantly from the first season finale. The show placed second in its timeslot and ninth for the night. Also, including DVR viewership, the episode was watched by a total of 7.28 million viewers and attained an 18-49 rating of 2.5.

The finale received mixed to negative reviews from critics. Matt Fowler of IGN gave the episode a 7.4 out of 10, signaling positive reviews, saying it "was a fairly focused episode. Escape the church and rescue Claire. Not much else going on. It attempted to get deep during the dinner scene, where Ryan had to admit (again) that he was a bad person, but that stuff always winds up sliding off the back of this series like a rainwater. Still, I liked the dinner showdown and appreciated that the episode was mostly a straightforward affair." He then commented on James Purefoy's role in the finale and season, saying "After last week's church massacre, Joe has seemed to have purged his system of all future cult activity, satisfied that his name will probably now live forever. Which made him a more docile, agreeable Joe when it came time to pair up with Ryan. It's all utterly silly, but at least it looks like next year Ryan and Joe might have a different dynamic."

Sean McKenna of TV Fanatic gave the episode — and the season — a mixed review, rating the finale 3 out of 5, saying " There’s no doubt that The Following Season 2 featired [sic] a promising and entertaining first half that reinvigorated the series. And yet, as if it couldn’t help but follow the path of The Following Season 1, the second half seemed to fall apart on its inevitable journey to a Ryan and Joe final face off with stuff that really ended up not mattering thrown in along the way." He then commented positively on Ryan's decision to spare Joe, saying "I appreciate Ryan’s closure and seeing him attain the victory without killing Joe, but it doesn’t excuse the mess that led up to the final hour of The Following Season 2. Too many shock value killings, pointless mini-quests and plenty of characters making really bad decisions plagued those latter episodes."

Sonia Saraiya of The A.V. Club gave a much more negative response to the episode, giving it a D grade, saying "The problem is that this show never really committed to what Joe Carroll was supposed to be. In the first season, he was megalomaniacal; in this season, he’s oddly measured and wry. This finale plays more like a bizarre buddy-cop comedy—in which Ryan and Joe play bad-cop/worse-cop against a pair of crazy serial killers who believe in death; never mind that Joe is also a crazy serial killer who believes in death." Dan Hajducky of Den of Geek also gave a negative review, rating it 1 out of 5, saying "There it is, folks. Season 2, in the books. For me, The Following is a show that has undone all of its original promise. It’s unfortunate to see the talents of Bacon, Ashmore, Purefoy, Underwood, and Stroup squandered on this semi-soap opera."
