= Unmasked (The Following) =

- The Following episode
- Episode no.: Season 2 Episode 9
- Directed by: Nicole Kassell
- Written by: Vincent Angell
- Production code: 2J7559
- Original air date: March 17, 2014

Guest appearances
- Shane McRae as Robert; Jake Weber as Micah; Jacinda Barrett as Julia; Sprague Grayden as Carrie Cooke; David Call as Lance; Valerie Cruz as Agent Gina Mendez; Leslie Bibb as Jana; John Lafayette as Marshal Scott Turner

Episode chronology
| ← Previous "The Messenger" | Next → "Teacher's Pet" |
- The Following (season 2)

"Unmasked" is the ninth episode of the second season of the psychological thriller television series The Following, which premiered on March 17, 2014, on Fox. The episode was written by Vincent Angell and directed by Nicole Kassell.

== Summary ==
Micah and Joe watch a news clip on Lily Gray, put together by Carrie Cooke. Micah tells Joe that he wants to "make a splash" like Lily did. Joe calls Jana Murphy, Gina's former spouse, to let her know that he needs her help.

Carrie asks Ryan out for dinner; he declines but promises to keep her updated on the Joe Carroll case. Max and Weston look through Max's research of possible moles in the FBI. Agent Gina Mendez is one of the suspected few, though Ryan doesn't believe she's guilty despite her usage of her security access to get into deceased FBI agent Debra Parker's e-mail.

Micah and Joe start filming a video of Micah making an announcement but are interrupted by Robert and Emma, who are preparing to go on a mission for Micah. Micah tells them they'll be joined by Lance, an ex-killer who has been locked up with other killers for bad behavior. Before they leave, Emma and Joe share a kiss and Robert questions their relationship, though Emma denies there is anything serious going on.

Ryan questions Gina after a disguised Max plants a tracker on her while passing her by. She denies any involvement and Ryan walks away. Gina goes to Jana's house, with Mike and Ryan following behind. She lets herself in and asks Jana to speak with her privately, since she has company over. Jana brings Gina into the garage, where Gina questions her involvement with Joe. Jana stabs Gina and takes her gun. She then goes upstairs to gather her money as her friend lets Mike and Ryan in and they find Gina laying in a pool of blood in the garage. They corner Jana, all with their guns raised, and ask her where Joe is. Jana, saying that it doesn't matter, shoots herself in the head. Gina is taken into the ambulance alive and apologizes to Ryan.

Micah asks Joe for advice on how to handle Julia's recent discomfort with Micah and his intentions. Joe explains his position, saying his one regret is what happened to Claire. Micah has Julia brought to him and they argue until Julia says she will go along with his decisions. Instead however, she reaches for his gun and attempts to shoot him, though the gun was empty. Joe wraps her neck with a garrote wire and kills her, to which Micah says "thank you."

Robert, Emma, and Lance enter a book store and walk around separately. A book signing with Carrie begins and Emma waits in line. After asking for her book to be signed out to Joe Carroll, Carrie recognizes her and screams for help. Robert and Lance begin killing the bookstore shoppers and employees at random while Emma hands Carrie a video clip and instructs her to share it with the world, threatening they will come back for her and those she loves if she doesn't. Robert and Emma escape before police enter, but Lance stays behind, ditching his mask and weapons. Later, as police and the FBI are inventorying the crime scene, Ryan notices Lance acting suspicious, eventually pulling a gun on him after he pulls a knife on a female police officer. The officer escapes Lance's grasp and he is shot dead.

Joe passes out drinks to Micah, Robert, and Emma as they begin watching Carrie's news report where she plays the clip Emma gave her. Micah realizes the clip they're watching is not the one he recorded, but is of Joe revealing to the world he is alive and nobody should feel safe. Micah begins to foam at the mouth and dies from the drugs Joe put in his drink. Robert has the Korban cult proclaim Joe as their new leader, informing them all that Micah and Julia have joined the afterlife.

Back at Ryan's apartment, Carrie shows up when Max and Weston leave after Weston receives a phone call. Carrie and Ryan have dinner and share a kiss before she leaves. After Weston leaves, he gets into the back of a car. The driver brings him to meet up with another driver, where he blindfolds himself until they get to another location. Weston goes inside and meets up with Agent Philips, who brings him into a room. Inside the room, Weston is greeted by Claire Matthews, whom both Ryan and Joe believe to be dead.

== Reception ==
=== Critical response ===
Sonia Saraiya of The A.V. Club rated the episode an F, saying "see The Following continue to be stupid." A more positive review came from Dan Hajducky of Den of Geek, who said "If you’ve been disappointed with Season 2, “Unmasked” is a reminder that the show is still capable of quality episodes." Another positive review came from Mark Trammell of TV Equals, stating "Every time there seems to be cause for concern, the show has an uncanny way of righting itself just before it’s too late. In “Unmasked,” the show took care of some business that needed to be taken care of, and then some. I mean, every time I think I’m out, they pull me back in. And I can’t imagine anyone saw that final twist coming."

=== Ratings ===
The episode received a 1.4/4 18–49 ratings share and was watched by 3.95 million viewers. These numbers hit a series low, down 7% from the previous episode's 18–49 ratings.
