= List of The Following episodes =

The Following is an American psychological thriller television series created by Kevin Williamson for the Fox network. Kevin Bacon stars as former FBI agent Ryan Hardy, who is brought out of retirement when infamous serial killer Joe Carroll (James Purefoy), whom Hardy had previously captured, escapes from custody. Hardy soon discovers that the charismatic Carroll has surrounded himself with a group of like-minded individuals whom he met while teaching and while in prison, and turned them into a cult of fanatical killers. When Carroll's son Joey (Kyle Catlett) is abducted by his father's followers, the FBI discovers that it is the first step in a wider plan for Carroll to escape custody, humiliate and eventually kill Hardy, and reunite Carroll with his ex-wife Claire (Natalie Zea).

The series' first season premiered on January 21, 2013. On March 7, 2014, Fox renewed The Following for a third season which premiered in 2015. On May 8, 2015, Fox canceled the series. During the course of the series, 45 episodes of The Following aired over three seasons, between January 21, 2013, and May 18, 2015.

== Series overview ==
| Season | Episodes | Originally released | |
| Season | Episodes | First released | Last released |
|---|---|---|---|
| 1 | 15 | January 21, 2013 | April 29, 2013 |
| 2 | 15 | January 19, 2014 | April 28, 2014 |
| 3 | 15 | March 2, 2015 | May 18, 2015 |

== Episodes ==
=== Season 1 (2013) ===
| No. overall | No. in season | Title | Directed by | Written by | Original release date | Prod. code | US viewers (millions) |
|---|---|---|---|---|---|---|---|
| 1 | 1 | "Pilot" | Marcos Siega | Kevin Williamson | January 21, 2013 | 296815 | 10.42 |
| 2 | 2 | "Chapter Two" | Marcos Siega | Kevin Williamson | January 28, 2013 | 2J7402 | 10.10 |
| 3 | 3 | "The Poet's Fire" | Liz Friedlander | Adam Armus & Kay Foster | February 4, 2013 | 2J7403 | 9.01 |
| 4 | 4 | "Mad Love" | Henry Bronchtein | Story by : Andrew Wilder and Kevin Williamson; Teleplay by : Kevin Williamson | February 11, 2013 | 2J7404 | 8.79 |
| 5 | 5 | "The Siege" | Phil Abraham | Rebecca Dameron | February 18, 2013 | 2J7405 | 8.39 |
| 6 | 6 | "The Fall" | Marcos Siega | Shintaro Shimosawa | February 25, 2013 | 2J7406 | 8.58 |
| 7 | 7 | "Let Me Go" | Nick Gomez | Seamus Kevin Fahey | March 4, 2013 | 2J7407 | 8.81 |
| 8 | 8 | "Welcome Home" | Joshua Butler | Amanda Kate Shuman | March 11, 2013 | 2J7408 | 8.15 |
| 9 | 9 | "Love Hurts" | Marcos Siega & Adam Davidson | Adam Armus & Kay Foster | March 18, 2013 | 2J7409 | 8.34 |
| 10 | 10 | "Guilt" | Joshua Butler | Kevin Williamson & Shintaro Shimosawa | March 25, 2013 | 2J7410 | 6.66 |
| 11 | 11 | "Whips and Regret" | Marcos Siega | Kevin Williamson & Rebecca Dameron | April 1, 2013 | 2J7411 | 6.57 |
| 12 | 12 | "The Curse" | David Von Ancken | Seamus Kevin Fahey & Amanda Kate Shuman | April 8, 2013 | 2J7412 | 6.30 |
| 13 | 13 | "Havenport" | Nicole Kassell | David Wilcox & Vincent Angell | April 15, 2013 | 2J7413 | 6.36 |
| 14 | 14 | "The End is Near" | Joshua Butler | Adam Armus & Kay Foster | April 22, 2013 | 2J7414 | 7.04 |
| 15 | 15 | "The Final Chapter" | Marcos Siega | Kevin Williamson | April 29, 2013 | 2J7415 | 7.82 |

=== Season 2 (2014) ===
| No. overall | No. in season | Title | Directed by | Written by | Original release date | Prod. code | US viewers (millions) |
|---|---|---|---|---|---|---|---|
| 16 | 1 | "Resurrection" | Marcos Siega | Kevin Williamson | January 19, 2014 | 2J7551 | 11.18 |
| 17 | 2 | "For Joe" | Joshua Butler | Vincent Angell | January 27, 2014 | 2J7552 | 6.02 |
| 18 | 3 | "Trust Me" | Liz Friedlander | Alexi Hawley | February 3, 2014 | 2J7553 | 5.84 |
| 19 | 4 | "Family Affair" | Marcos Siega | Brett Mahoney | February 10, 2014 | 2J7554 | 4.76 |
| 20 | 5 | "Reflection" | Nicole Kassell | Lizzie Mickery | February 17, 2014 | 2J7555 | 5.19 |
| 21 | 6 | "Fly Away" | Rob Seidenglanz | Dewayne Jones | February 24, 2014 | 2J7556 | 4.61 |
| 22 | 7 | "Sacrifice" | Adam Davidson | Scott Reynolds | March 3, 2014 | 2J7557 | 5.16 |
| 23 | 8 | "The Messenger" | Marcos Siega | Alexi Hawley | March 10, 2014 | 2J7558 | 4.86 |
| 24 | 9 | "Unmasked" | Nicole Kassell | Vincent Angell | March 17, 2014 | 2J7559 | 3.95 |
| 25 | 10 | "Teacher's Pet" | Marcos Siega | Brett Mahoney | March 24, 2014 | 2J7560 | 4.07 |
| 26 | 11 | "Freedom" | Liz Friedlander | Dewayne Jones | March 31, 2014 | 2J7561 | 4.17 |
| 27 | 12 | "Betrayal" | Marcos Siega | Lizzie Mickery | April 7, 2014 | 2J7562 | 4.41 |
| 28 | 13 | "The Reaping" | Joshua Butler | Megan Martin | April 14, 2014 | 2J7563 | 4.36 |
| 29 | 14 | "Silence" | Steve Shill | Scott Reynolds | April 21, 2014 | 2J7564 | 4.42 |
| 30 | 15 | "Forgive" | Marcos Siega | Kevin Williamson | April 28, 2014 | 2J7565 | 4.81 |

=== Season 3 (2015) ===
| No. overall | No. in season | Title | Directed by | Written by | Original release date | Prod. code | US viewers (millions) |
|---|---|---|---|---|---|---|---|
| 31 | 1 | "New Blood" | Marcos Siega | Alexi Hawley & Brett Mahoney | March 2, 2015 | 3J5301 | 4.86 |
| 32 | 2 | "Boxed In" | Rob Seidenglanz | Barry O'Brien | March 9, 2015 | 3J5302 | 3.51 |
| 33 | 3 | "Exposed" | Gary Love | Brynn Malone | March 16, 2015 | 3J5303 | 3.53 |
| 34 | 4 | "Home" | Nicole Kassell | Jeff Eckerle & Marilyn Osborn | March 23, 2015 | 3J5304 | 3.93 |
| 35 | 5 | "A Hostile Witness" | Marcos Siega | Michael McGrale | March 23, 2015 | 3J5305 | 3.75 |
| 36 | 6 | "Reunion" | Mary Harron | Brett Mahoney | March 30, 2015 | 3J5306 | 3.28 |
| 37 | 7 | "The Hunt" | Sylvain White | Liz Sczudlo | April 6, 2015 | 3J5307 | 2.95 |
| 38 | 8 | "Flesh & Blood" | Marcos Siega | Mary Leah Sutton | April 13, 2015 | 3J5308 | 3.46 |
| 39 | 9 | "Kill the Messenger" | David Tuttman | Barry O'Brien | April 20, 2015 | 3J5309 | 3.41 |
| 40 | 10 | "Evermore" | David McWhirter | Alexi Hawley | April 27, 2015 | 3J5310 | 3.46 |
| 41 | 11 | "Demons" | Marcos Siega | Dave Johnson | May 4, 2015 | 3J5311 | 3.22 |
| 42 | 12 | "The Edge" | Nicole Kassell | Jeff Eckerle & Marilyn Osborn | May 11, 2015 | 3J5312 | 3.21 |
| 43 | 13 | "A Simple Trade" | Marcos Siega | Liz Sczudlo & Mary Leah Sutton | May 11, 2015 | 3J5313 | 3.07 |
| 44 | 14 | "Dead or Alive" | Rob Seidenglanz | Brynn Malone & Michael McGrale | May 18, 2015 | 3J5314 | 3.13 |
| 45 | 15 | "The Reckoning" | Marcos Siega | Brett Mahoney & Alexi Hawley | May 18, 2015 | 3J5315 | 3.05 |

=== Specials ===
| Special no. | Title | Narrator | Aired between | Original air date | U.S. viewers (millions) |
|---|---|---|---|---|---|
| 1 | "The Following: Revisited" | TBA | Season 1 and Season 2 | January 4, 2014 | N/A |
