= Rewind (2013 film) =

- Genre: Action; Adventure; Science Fiction
- Written by: Justin Marks
- Directed by: Jack Bender
- Theme music composer: Michael Beach, Jonathan Ortega
- Country of origin: United States
- Original language: English

Production
- Producer: Jack Bender
- Running time: 76 minutes
- Production companies: BermanBraun; Universal Cable Productions

Original release
- Network: NBC
- Release: August 26, 2013

Rewind is a 2013 made-for-television science fiction film which served as the pilot episode of an unaired television show. It premiered in the United States in August 2013.

== Plot ==
The film opens with an apparent terrorist attack involving a nuclear device which destroys New York City, killing nine million people. The perpetrator, Benjamin Rourke, a Nobel Prize-winning physicist, had become embittered by the death of his wife. Having learned of a potential time travel experiment in progress, he engineered the bomb plot to force the US Government to send agents back to prevent the disaster from happening. He had also arranged matters that the only way to do this was to have them prevent his wife's death. The story describes the process of the team, CIA agents Sean Knox and Danny Gates, and scientist Lyndsay Bryce, arriving at this conclusion and their efforts without doing too much damage to the time-line.

== Cast ==
- Shane McRae as Shaun Knox
- Jennifer Ferrin as Dr. Lyndsay Bryce
- Robbie Jones as Danny Gates
- Jeff Fahey as Ellis
- Keon Alexander as Charlie
- Keisha Castle Hughes as Priya
- Matthew Bennett as John Malcolm
- David Cronenberg as Benjamin Rourke

== See also ==
- Timeless (TV series)
