= Valorie Curry =

American actress (born 1986)

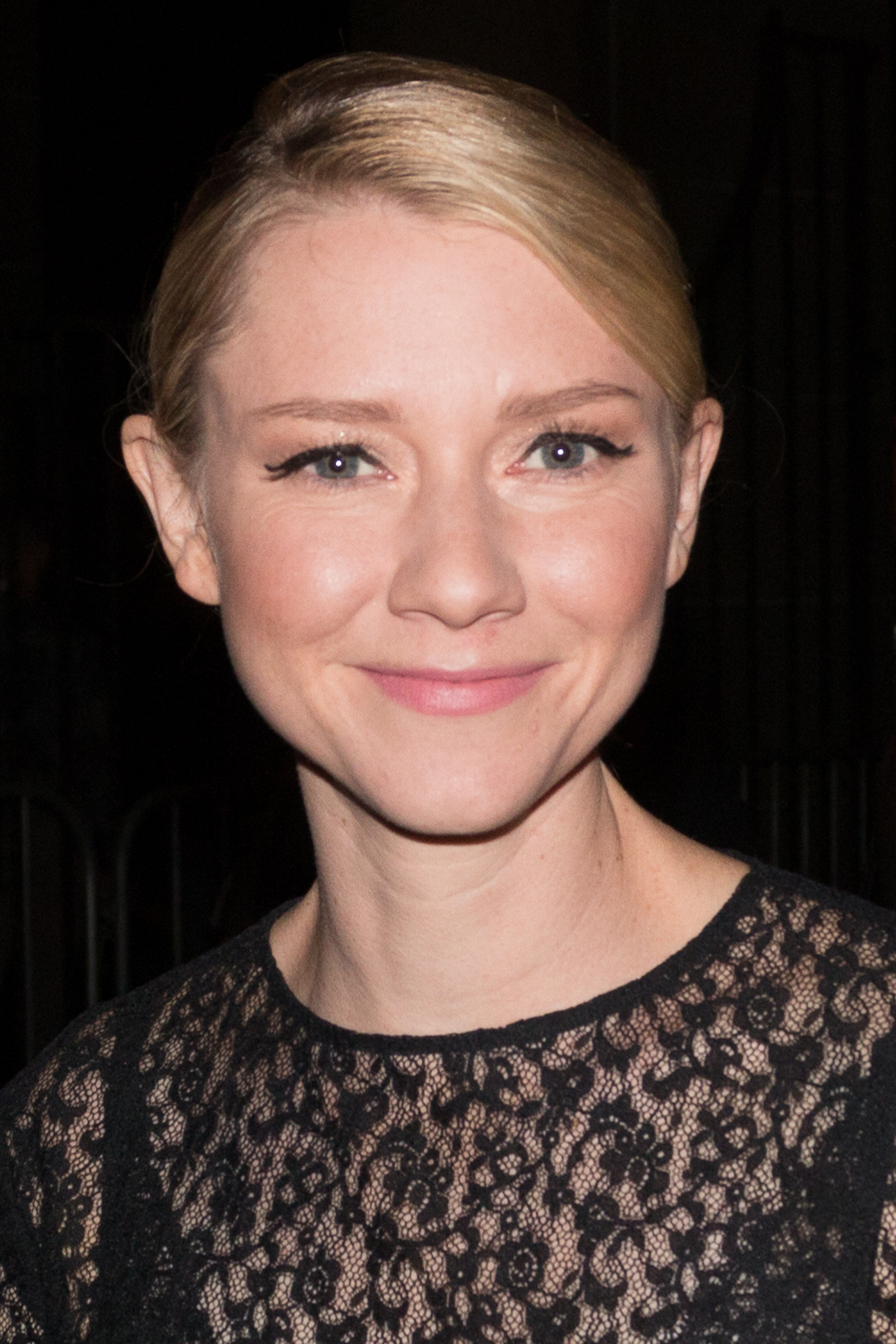
- Curry at the 2016 Toronto International Film Festival
- Born: February 12, 1986 (age 40); Orange County, California, U.S.
- Education: California State University, Fullerton (BA)
- Occupations: Actress, voice actress
- Years active: 2005–present
- Spouse: Sam Underwood (m. 2016; div. 2023)

Valorie Curry (born February 12, 1986) is an American actress. She is known to television audiences for her role as Misty Tucker Gray / Firecracker on The Boys (2024–2026) and its spinoff Gen V (2025), as well as Emma Hill on The Following (2013–14) and Dot Everest on The Tick (2016–19).

== Early life and education ==
Curry grew up with her brother David and sister Colleen in Orange County, California, graduating from Sonora High School in La Habra, California in 2004. She attended California State University, Fullerton, graduating in 2008 with a Bachelor of Arts in theater.

== Career ==
Curry has worked with The Second City and Phantom Projects theatre groups, performing such roles as Jennie Mae in The Diviners and Monique in Out, Out, Brief Candle!, as well as roles in Oklahoma!, Bus Stop, How to Succeed in Business Without Really Trying, and The Diary of Anne Frank.

Curry's television credits include Veronica Mars (2005–06), The Following (2013–14) and The Tick (2016–19). She portrayed the superhero Firecracker in the fourth and fifth seasons of the Amazon Prime Video series The Boys (2024–26) and reprised the role in the second season of its spin-off Gen V (2025).

She also starred as the titular character in the PlayStation 3 tech demo Kara (2012) and reprised her role as Kara in the video game Detroit: Become Human (2018).

== Personal life ==
Curry described herself as pansexual in 2019, and later reports referred to her as a lesbian.

Curry married actor Sam Underwood in 2016 after co starring with him on the TV show The Following. They separated in 2022 and divorced in April 2023.

== Filmography ==
=== Film ===
Year	Title	Role	Notes
2011	I Love You Like Crazy	Melody	Short film
2012	Kara	Kara (voice)	Short film (tech demo); Also motion capture
2012	The Twilight Saga: Breaking Dawn – Part 2	Charlotte	
2015	Bus Stop	Alexia	Short film
2016	American Pastoral	Rita Cohen	
2016	Blair Witch	Talia	
2018	After Darkness	Margot	
2019	Inherit the Viper	Eve	

=== Television ===
Year	Title	Role	Notes
2005–06	Veronica Mars	Jane Kuhne	6 episodes
2011	CSI: NY	Hannah McCray	Episode: "Indelible"
2012	Psych	Rose-Marie Farrow	Episode: "Heeeeere's Lassie"
2013–14	The Following	Emma Hill	Main role
2015–16	House of Lies	Kelsey	Recurring role
2016–19	The Tick	Dot Everest	Main role
2021	The Lost Symbol	Katherine Solomon	Recurring role
2024–26	The Boys	Misty Tucker Gray / Firecracker	Main role (seasons 4–5); 14 episodes
2025	Gen V	Misty Tucker Gray / Firecracker	2 episodes

=== Music videos ===
Year	Title	Role	Artist(s)
2012	"After Midnight"	Lead Female Patient	Blink-182

=== Video games ===
Year	Title	Voice role	Notes
2018	Detroit: Become Human	Kara	Also motion capture
2024	Call of Duty: Modern Warfare III	Misty Tucker Gray / Firecracker	Playable DLC character; also likeness

== Awards and nominations ==
Award	Year	Category	Work	Result	Ref.
Gamers' Choice Awards	2018	Fan Favorite Female Voice Actor	Detroit: Become Human	Nominated	
NAVGTR Awards	2019	Performance in a Drama, Lead	Detroit: Become Human	Nominated	
