= Jacinda Barrett =

Australian actress (born 1972)

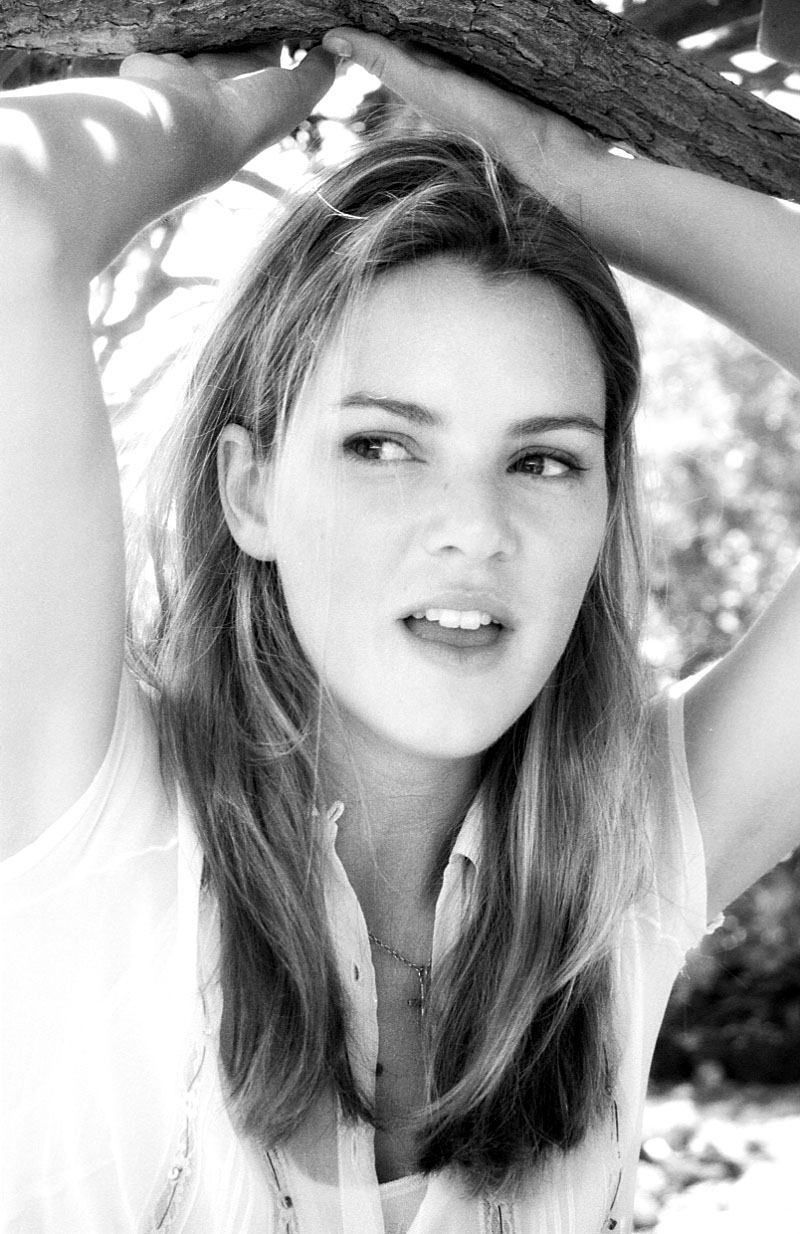
- Barrett in 1998
- Born: Giacinta Juanita Cordelia Arabella Luciana Rosalina Barrett; 2 August 1972 (age 54); Brisbane, Queensland, Australia
- Education: British American Drama Academy
- Occupation: Actress
- Years active: 1992–present
- Height: 5 ft 10 in (178 cm)
- Spouse: Gabriel Macht (m. 2004)
- Children: 2
- Relatives: Stephen Macht (father-in-law)

Jacinda Barrett Macht (born 2 August 1972) is an Australian-American actress and former model. She first became known to audiences as a cast member on The Real World: London (1995) before appearing in films such as The Human Stain (2003), Bridget Jones: The Edge of Reason (2004), Ladder 49 (2004), The Namesake (2006), Poseidon (2006), and The Last Kiss (2006). She appeared in the series The Following in 2013 and joined the main cast of the Netflix series Bloodline, which launched in 2015.

== Early life, family and education ==
Barrett was born in Brisbane, Queensland, Australia.

She attended Kenmore State High School in Brisbane. Later, in 1997, she attended a Midsummer program at the British American Drama Academy in Oxford, England.

== Career ==
As a high school student, she won the annual Dolly Covergirl contest in Australia in 1988 and started modeling at the age of 17 throughout Europe.

Barrett appeared in the September 1998 issue of Maxim, in an article promoting the new fall television series. Her appearance served to promote her appearance in the NBC primetime soap opera Wind on Water.

Barrett and her husband have performed together at least twice. They appeared in the film Middle Men (2009), and she had a recurring role in the second season of the TV series Suits (2012–2013), playing a love interest of her husband's character.

== Personal life ==
Barrett was previously engaged to TV host and comedian Chris Hardwick before her marriage to American actor Gabriel Macht in 2004. The couple had their first daughter, in August 2007 in Los Angeles. They had a second child, a son, in February 2014.

On 28 August 2009, Barrett was naturalized as a US citizen at the Los Angeles Convention Center. Barrett enjoys skydiving.

== Filmography ==
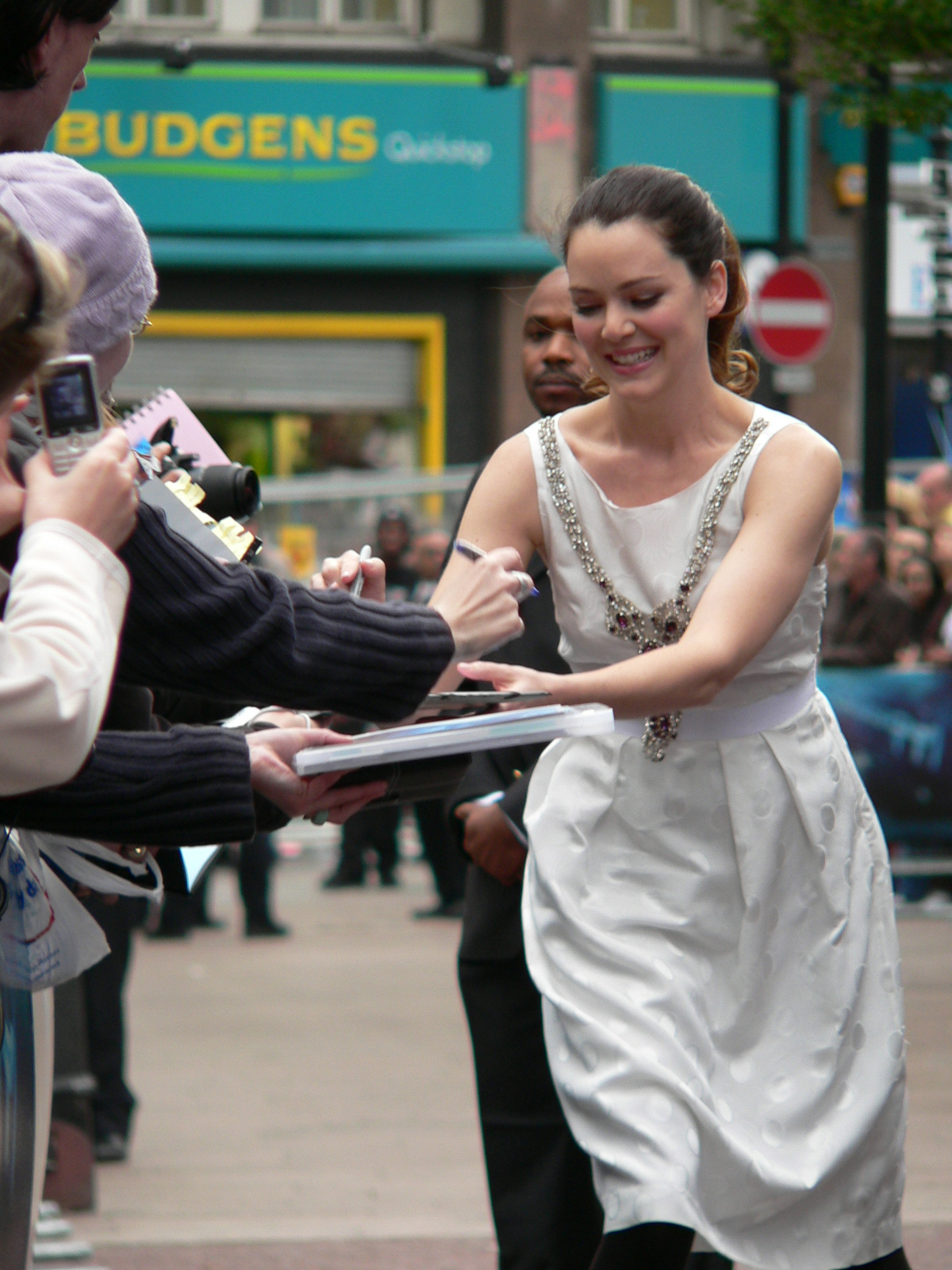
Barrett at the premiere of Poseidon, 2006

=== Film ===
Year	Title	Role	Notes
1997	Campfire Tales	Heather Wallace	Segment: "The Locket"
1998	Immaculate Springs		
1998	Art House	Tiffany	
1999	24-Seven	Claire	Short film
2000	Urban Legends: Final Cut	Lisa	
2003	The Human Stain	Steena Paulsson	
2004	Ladder 49	Linda Morrison	
2004	Bridget Jones: The Edge of Reason	Rebecca Gillies	
2005	Ripley Under Ground	Heloise Plisson	
2006	Poseidon	Maggie James	
2006	The Namesake	Maxine Ratcliffe	
2006	The Last Kiss	Jenna	
2006	School for Scoundrels	Amanda	
2008	New York, I Love You	Maggie	Segment: "Natalie Portman"
2009	Middle Men	Diana Harris	
2010	Matching Jack	Marissa	
2011	A Proper Send-Off	Alex	Short film
2016	So B. It	Ruby Franklin	
2018	Seven in Heaven	Megan	
2021	Hide and Seek	Samantha Blackwell	

=== Television ===
Year	Title	Role	Notes
1995	The Real World: London	Herself	Main role
1998	Wind on Water	Kate Poole	Recurring role
1998	Night Man	The Amazing Selene/Lucy Develin	Episode: "Do You Believe in Magic?"
1998	Hercules: The Legendary Journeys	Medea	Episode: "Medea Culpa"
1998	Guys Like Us	Audrey	Episode: "Truth or Consequences"
1999	Millennium	Taylor Watts	Episode: "Collateral Damage"
1999	Zoe, Duncan, Jack and Jane	Lisa	Episodes: "The Trouble with Jane", "A Good Man is Hard to Find", "The Advice"
2000	Bull	Holly Cameron	Recurring role
2000	D.C.	Finley Scott	Main role
2001	Citizen Baines	Dori Baines	Main role
2004	See You in My Dreams	Ingrid	TV film
2012–2013	Suits	Zoe Lawford	Recurring role
2013	Zero Hour	Laila Galliston	Main role
2014	The Following	Julia	Episodes: "Sacrifice", "The Messenger", "The Unmasked"
2015–2017	Bloodline	Diana Rayburn	Main role
