= Sam Underwood =

English actor (born 1987)

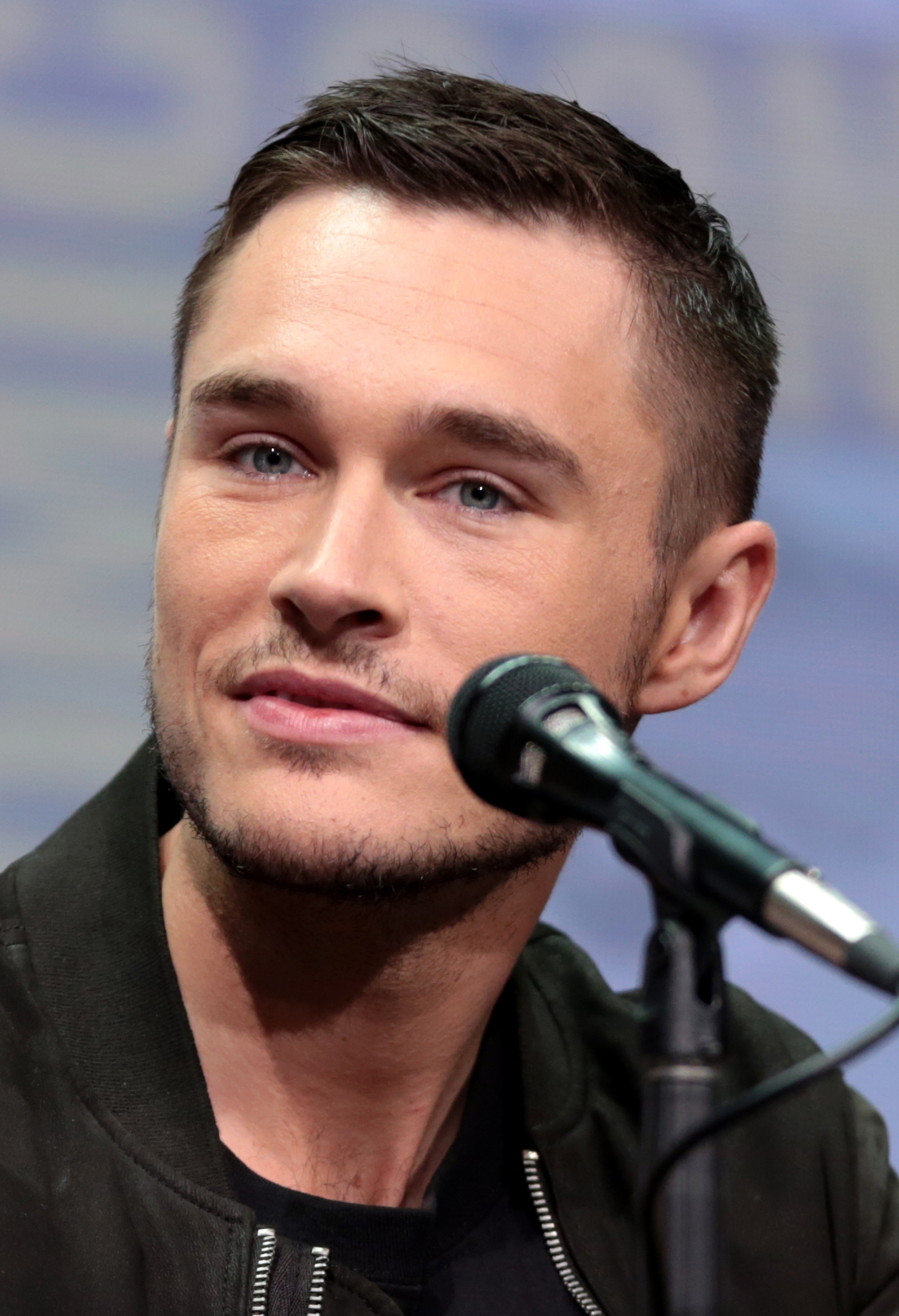
- Underwood at the 2017 San Diego Comic-Con
- Born: Sam Lewis Underwood; 4 August 1987 (age 39); Woking, Surrey, Dorset
- Occupation: Actor
- Years active: 2010–present
- Spouse: Valorie Curry (m. 2016; div. 2023)

Sam Lewis Underwood (born 4 August 1987) is an English actor who portrayed the twins Luke and Mark Gray in the Fox thriller drama The Following, Jake Otto in the AMC series Fear the Walking Dead (2017), and Adam Carrington in The CW series Dynasty (2019–2022).

== Early life and education ==
Underwood was born in Woking, Surrey and attended the Winston Churchill School. He trained at the Karen Clarke Theatre Group (now Summerscales Performing Arts), was taught by vocal coach Phil Wisdom and attended Songtime Theatre Arts.

He moved to the United States in October 2006 where he studied at the American Musical and Dramatic Academy in New York. He graduated in February 2008.

He co-founded the Fundamental Theater Project in New York with Nicola Murphy in April 2010.

== Career ==
While appearing as Marchbanks in George Bernard Shaw's Candida at the Irish Repertory Theatre, New York, in April 2010, Underwood was asked to play the part of Alan Strang in a production of Equus at the John Drew Theater at Guild Hall of East Hampton, co-starring alongside Alec Baldwin.

In 2013, Underwood was cast in the eighth season of television series Dexter in the recurring role of Zach Hamilton, Dexter Morgan's "protégé". He subsequently joined the third season of Homeland as Leo Carras.

Beginning in February 2014, Underwood took on the dual roles of twins Mark and Luke Gray in the second season of the Fox murder mystery The Following. But after the death of Luke, he was left playing Mark - who had split identities - in its third and final season.

As of 2017, Underwood joined the cast of the AMC thriller series Fear the Walking Dead in its third season as Jake Otto, the enigmatic son of the colony leader.

In 2019, Underwood was cast as Adam Carrington in The CW television series Dynasty, a reboot of the 1980s series of the same name.

In 2025, Underwood starred in the play Ivanov at the Unadilla Theatre in Calais, Vermont.

== Personal life ==
Underwood married actress Valorie Curry on May 13, 2016. They separated in 2022 and divorced in April 2023.

On October 7, 2023, Underwood was arrested on felony domestic battery charges after he allegedly got into a physical altercation with an unidentified woman. He was released after approximately 10 hours in custody.

== Filmography ==
=== Television ===
Year(s)	Title	Role(s)	Description
2013	Zero Hour	Martin Krupp	Season 1
2013	Dexter	Zach Hamilton	Season 8
2013	Homeland	Leo Carras	Season 3
2014–2015	The Following	Luke and Mark Gray	Main cast (seasons 2–3)
2017	Fear the Walking Dead	Jake Otto	Main role (season 3); 12 episodes
2018	Madam Secretary	Andrew Hill	Season 4, episode 19: “Thin Ice”
2019–2022	Dynasty	Adam Carrington	Guest star (Episode: "Parisian Legend Has It..."); Series regular (season 2–5)
2023	The Rookie: Feds	Roman Griffith	Season 1, episode 21: "Bloodline"

=== Film ===
Year	Title	Role	Description
2013	The Last Keepers	Oliver Sands	Feature film (debut)
2017	Hello Again	Leocadia	
2021	The Drummer	Darien Cooper	

== Theatre ==
Year(s)	Title	Role	Director(s)	Location
2010	Candida	Marchbanks	Tony Walton	Irish Repertory Theatre
2010	Equus	Alan Strang	Tony Walton	John Drew Theater at Guild Hall of East Hampton
2010	Veritas	Lumbard	Ryan J. Davis	HERE Arts Center
2011	Hamlet	Hamlet		theSpace on the Mile, Edinburgh Festival
2012	The Picture of Dorian Gray	Dorian Gray	Quin Gordon	The Pershing Square Signature Center
2026	The Real Ivanov	Nikolai Ivanov	Laura Strausfeld	Lynn F. Angelson Theater
