= Bambadjan Bamba =

American-Ivorian actor

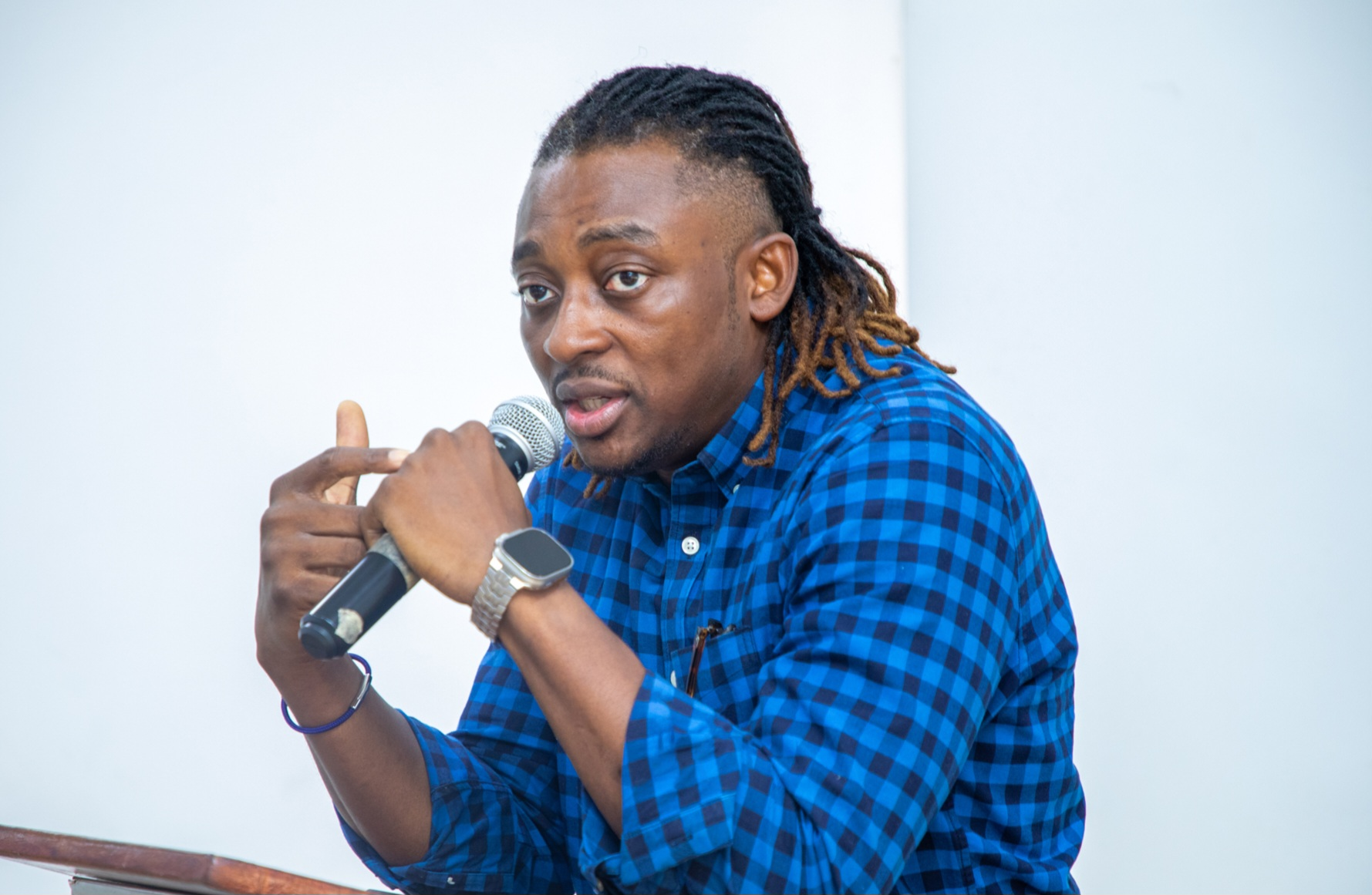
- Born: Abidjan, Ivory Coast
- Education: New York Conservatory for Dramatic Arts

Bambadjan Bamba (born in Abidjan) is an Ivorian actor and filmmaker and has minor roles in Black Panther, Suicide Squad, and The Good Place. He is also an immigrant rights advocate.

== Life and career ==
Bamba was born in the Ivory Coast and illegally came to the United States at the age of 10 in the 1990s. He spent his adolescent years in the South Bronx and Richmond, Virginia. He studied at the New York Conservatory for Dramatic Arts in New York City and is the owner of Ivostar Pictures.

He has appeared on television shows such as Grey's Anatomy, The Sopranos, and Bosch, and he had a recurring role on The Good Place. His film credits include Black Panther, Suicide Squad, and Beginners.

== Advocacy ==
In November 2017, in an interview with the Los Angeles Times, Bamba disclosed that he was a DACA recipient. He has since used his platform to advocate for undocumented immigrants to the United States. He has worked with Define American, a nonprofit media and culture organization which provides a venue for undocumented people to tell their own story, and he contributed to the anthology American Like Me: Reflections on life between cultures, edited by America Ferrera.

Bamba received the Courageous Advocate Award from the American Civil Liberties Union and the Courageous Luminary award from NILC (National Immigration Law Center).

== Filmography ==
Year	Title	Role	Notes
2006	Law and Order	Henry Young	Episode: "Hindsight"
2007	I Think I Love My Wife	Rapper on Elevator	
2007	The Sopranos	Somali Cyclist	Episode: "Kennedy and Heidi"
2007	Spinning into Butter	Male Student #2	
2009	ER	Psychotic	And in the End...
2010	Sympathy for Delicious	Guy in First Row	Uncredited
2010	Beginners	The Sads	
2011	Contagion	Dread	Uncredited
2011	Grey's Anatomy	Sefu	Episode: "White Wedding"
2012	Bones	Sam Sachs	Episode: 7x06 "The Crack in the Code"
2014	The Following	Sami	3 episodes
2014	Reality	Tony	
2016	Everything But a Man	Max's Housemate #2	
2016	Suicide Squad	T-shirt vendor	
2016–2019	The Good Place	Bambadjan	9 episodes
2018	A Futile and Stupid Gesture	Taxi Driver	Uncredited
2018	Black Panther	Militant Leader	
2020	Bosch	Remi Toussaint	7 episodes
