= Shane McRae =

American actor (born 1977)

- Born: July 23, 1977 (age 49); Gainesville, Florida, U.S.
- Education: University of Evansville (BFA); New York University (MFA)
- Occupation: Actor
- Years active: 1998–present

Shane McRae (born July 23, 1977) is an American actor. He is known for his roles as Taylor Bowman in the Amazon crime drama Sneaky Pete (2015–2019), Dickie Barrett in Paradise Lost (2020), Aaron Pritchard in Alaska Daily (2022–2023), and Knox in the Apple TV+ science-fiction series Silo (2023–present).

McRae began his professional career in theatre, appearing in the Broadway production of Take Me Out and in productions at The Public Theater and the Rattlestick Theater. His film appearances include The Adjustment Bureau (2011), The Help (2011), Still Alice (2014) and Lansky (2021).

== Early life and education ==
McRae was born in Gainesville, Florida, and grew up in Starkville, Mississippi. He attended the University of Evansville in Indiana, where he studied theatre, before moving to New York City to pursue graduate training in acting.

He earned a Master of Fine Arts degree from the New York University Tisch School of the Arts in 2003.

== Career ==
=== Stage career ===
Following his graduate training, McRae began his professional acting career on stage. His early work included the Broadway production of Richard Greenberg's Take Me Out, which won the Tony Award for Best Play in 2003.

He subsequently appeared in a production of William Shakespeare's Richard III at The Public Theater in New York.

In 2009, McRae appeared as Danny in a revival of Lucy Thurber's Killers and Other Family, staged at the Rattlestick Theater. The play follows a graduate student whose life is disrupted by the arrival of her brother and Danny, a man connected to traumatic events in her past.

The New Yorker described the production as a tense examination of family trauma and the difficulty of escaping one's past. Its review identified McRae's Danny as a threatening presence whose arrival forces the central character to confront her childhood.

=== Early television and film work ===
McRae made his television debut in an episode of Promised Land in 1998. During the 2000s, he appeared in the soap opera One Life to Live and the NBC sitcom Four Kings, in which he played Bobby.

His early television guest appearances included Law & Order: Criminal Intent, Cold Case, Medium, Gossip Girl and Law & Order: Special Victims Unit.

McRae also began appearing in feature films, including the romantic fantasy thriller The Adjustment Bureau (2011), in which he played Adrian Troussant, and the period drama The Help (2011), in which he portrayed Raleigh Leefolt.

He subsequently played Josh Shiffman in the romantic comedy One Small Hitch (2013) and Charlie Howland-Jones in Still Alice (2014).

During the 2010s, McRae held recurring roles in several television dramas. In 2013, he portrayed Eric Whaley in three episodes of Chicago Fire, appearing in a storyline involving firefighter Kelly Severide, played by Taylor Kinney.

In 2014, he played Robert in eight episodes of the Fox psychological thriller The Following, starring Kevin Bacon.

=== Sneaky Pete ===
From 2015 to 2019, McRae portrayed Taylor Bowman in the Amazon crime drama Sneaky Pete, starring Giovanni Ribisi, Margo Martindale and Marin Ireland.

Taylor is a member of the Bernhardt family, whose lives become entangled with a con artist impersonating a long-absent relative. McRae appeared throughout the series' three seasons.

In a 2018 interview with The Knockturnal, McRae discussed Taylor's development from an impulsive, self-centred young man into someone increasingly willing to accept responsibility for his family.

He identified a scene in the second season, in which Taylor discusses the deaths of his parents with his sister Carly, as particularly meaningful to him. McRae explained that the events of the first two seasons, which unfold over a relatively short period, force Taylor to confront his family history and reconsider his identity.

McRae also discussed the collaborative atmosphere on the set and the challenges of portraying a character whose emotional development occurs within the series' compressed timeline.

=== Paradise Lost, Alaska Daily and film roles ===
In 2020, McRae starred as Dickie Barrett in Paradise Lost, a Southern Gothic mystery drama produced for Spectrum Originals. The series follows a family whose return to Mississippi brings longstanding secrets and conflicts to the surface.

In the 2021 biographical crime drama Lansky, starring Harvey Keitel, McRae portrayed American organized-crime figure Lucky Luciano.

He also appeared in the science-fiction thriller Encounter (2021), starring Riz Ahmed, and the independent drama Midday Black Midnight Blue (2022).

In 2022, McRae joined the cast of the ABC drama Alaska Daily, starring Hilary Swank. He portrayed Aaron Pritchard, appearing in nine episodes of the series, which follows an investigative journalist working at an Anchorage newspaper.

=== Silo ===
Beginning in 2023, McRae portrayed Knox in the Apple TV+ science-fiction drama Silo, based on the novels by Hugh Howey and developed for television by Graham Yost. The series stars Rebecca Ferguson and depicts a community living inside a vast underground structure under strict rules governing its inhabitants.

Knox is the head of Mechanical, the department responsible for maintaining the machinery and infrastructure that keeps the silo functioning. The character becomes increasingly important as tensions grow between the silo's governing authorities and the workers in its lower levels.

In a September 2026 interview, McRae explained that he had previously worked with Yost on Sneaky Pete, establishing a professional relationship before joining Silo.

McRae discussed the contrast between Knox's stoic personality and his own more humorous disposition. He also praised the show's extensive use of practical sets, explaining that the physical environments helped the actors inhabit the underground world of the story.

During the interview, McRae discussed his experience filming the series in London, the relationships among the cast, and the development of Knox across the show's three seasons.

== Personal life ==
McRae is married and has two daughters. In a September 2026 interview, he said that he and his family had relocated from Los Angeles to Tulsa, Oklahoma, where his wife's parents live.

McRae explained that the move took place after he was cast in Silo. Because filming required him to spend extended periods in London, the family decided to relocate closer to his wife's relatives for additional support.

== Filmography ==
=== Film ===
Year	Title	Role	Notes
2001	All Over Again	Nelson	
2008	Killer Pad	Brody	
2008	The Collective	Conor	
2009	Bottleworld	Wilson	
2011	The Adjustment Bureau	Adrian Troussant	
2011	The Help	Raleigh Leefolt	
2012	Lefty Loosey Righty Tighty	Lloyd	
2013	One Small Hitch	Josh Shiffman	
2014	Still Alice	Charlie Howland-Jones	
2016	Better Off Single	Vince	
2020	Modern Persuasion	Owen Jasper	
2021	Lansky	Lucky Luciano	
2021	Encounter	Lance Dunn	
2022	Midday Black Midnight Blue	Cody	

=== Television ===
Year	Title	Role	Notes
1998	Promised Land	Ryan	Episode: "Balancing Act"
2004	Hack	Chris Olshansky	Episode: "Fog of War"
2004	One Life to Live	Paul Cramer	3 episodes
2006	Law & Order: Criminal Intent	Wesley Burkhartz	Episode: "The War at Home"
2006	Four Kings	Bobby	13 episodes
2006, 2008	Robot Chicken	Various characters	Voice roles; 2 episodes
2007	Cold Case	Nathan O'Donnell	Episode: "That Woman"
2007	The Mastersons of Manhattan	Bobby	Television film
2009	Medium	Eric Rogich	Episode: "The Talented Ms. Boddicker"
2009	Gossip Girl	PJ Buckley	Episode: "Enough About Eve"
2011	Law & Order: Special Victims Unit	Justin Jennings	Episode: "Bully"
2012	Blue Bloods	Johnny Evans	Episode: "Scorched Earth"
2013	Chicago Fire	Eric Whaley	3 episodes
2013	Rewind	Shaun Knox	Television film
2014	The Following	Robert	8 episodes
2014	Manhattan Love Story	Colin	Episode: "Let It Go"
2015	Forever	Detective Hugh Dunn	Episode: "Diamonds Are Forever"
2015–2016	Nashville	Patrick	2 episodes
2015–2019	Sneaky Pete	Taylor Bowman	Main cast; 30 episodes
2016	Game of Silence	Benjamin Todd	Episode: "Hey"
2020	Paradise Lost	Dickie Barrett	Main cast; 10 episodes
2022–2023	Alaska Daily	Aaron Pritchard	9 episodes
2023–present	Silo	Knox	Recurring role
2026	The Lowdown	McMann	Season 2
