= The Following =

2013 American crime thriller television series

- Genre: Psychological thriller; Horror; Crime drama
- Created by: Kevin Williamson
- Starring: Kevin Bacon; James Purefoy; Shawn Ashmore; Jessica Stroup; Valorie Curry; Nico Tortorella; Adan Canto; Kyle Catlett; Maggie Grace; Annie Parisse; Sam Underwood; Tiffany Boone; Connie Nielsen; Zuleikha Robinson; Jeananne Goossen; Natalie Zea; Gregg Henry; Michael Ealy
- Composer: John Frizzell
- Country of origin: United States
- Original language: English
- No. of seasons: 3
- No. of episodes: 45 (list of episodes)

Production
- Executive producers: Kevin Williamson; Marcos Siega
- Producers: Rebecca Dameron; Michael Stricks
- Cinematography: David Tuttman
- Editor: Rob Seidenglanz
- Camera setup: Single camera
- Running time: 41–45 minutes
- Production companies: Outerbanks Entertainment; Bonanza Productions; Warner Bros. Television

Original release
- Network: Fox
- Release: January 21, 2013 – May 18, 2015

The Following is an American crime thriller television series created by Kevin Williamson. In its first two seasons, it starred Kevin Bacon and James Purefoy in leading roles, as well as Shawn Ashmore, Natalie Zea, and Valorie Curry.

The first season follows former FBI agent Ryan Hardy (Kevin Bacon) trying to help recapture serial killer Joe Carroll, while Carroll's assembled cult captures Carroll's son from his ex-wife and sends Carroll's messages to the world. The second season introduces Hardy's niece, who provides help in finding Carroll after his faked death while also dealing with a new cult.

The first season, comprising 15 episodes, premiered on Fox on January 21, 2013, and concluded on April 29, 2013. On March 4, 2013, the series was renewed for a second season, which premiered on January 19, 2014, and concluded on April 28, 2014. The series' renewal for a third season was announced on March 7, 2014, and the season premiered on March 2, 2015. On May 8, 2015, Fox canceled The Following after three seasons. The final episode aired on May 18, 2015.

== Overview ==
Set in New York City, Virginia, and Maryland, The Following's first season centers on former FBI agent Ryan Hardy (Kevin Bacon) and his attempts to recapture serial killer Joe Carroll (James Purefoy), following the latter's escape from prison. Hardy soon discovers that Carroll has surrounded himself with a group of like-minded individuals, whom he met while teaching and in prison, turning them into a cult of fanatical killers, making Emma Hill (Valorie Curry) his right-hand woman. When Carroll's son, Joey Matthews (Kyle Catlett), is abducted by his father's followers, Agents Mike Weston (Shawn Ashmore), Debra Parker (Annie Parisse), and the rest of the FBI team discover that it is the first step in Carroll's wider plan to escape custody, humiliate Hardy, and be reunited with his ex-wife Claire Matthews (Natalie Zea).

The second season centers on a new cult, led by Lily Gray (Connie Nielsen) and her twin sons Mark and Luke Gray (both played by Sam Underwood), as they begin to make public statements to lure Carroll out of hiding while the rest of the world believes him to be dead. Weston is re-recruited by Special Agent Mendez (Valerie Cruz) and the FBI in order to find the new cult, while Hardy and his niece Max Hardy (Jessica Stroup) have their own plans to track them down and find Carroll, if he is in fact alive.

The third season follows Hardy's life after Carroll's arrest and shows Hardy in a better place. He is close to his niece and has a girlfriend. Weston follows a different path and chooses to hunt down Mark Gray. Carroll is on death row, waiting to be executed, but plays an important role in the season. Another serial killer proves to be just as dangerous and capable as Joe Carroll.

== Cast and characters ==
=== Main cast ===
- Kevin Bacon as Ryan Hardy, a former FBI agent, recalled to assist the FBI once Joe Carroll escapes and begins to develop his cult
- Jeananne Goossen as Jennifer Mason (pilot), an FBI agent who is replaced by Debra Parker after the pilot episode
- Natalie Zea as Claire Matthews (seasons 1–2), Joe Carroll's ex-wife, who also had a relationship with Ryan Hardy
- Annie Parisse as Debra Parker (season 1), head of the investigation on Joe Carroll and his cult
- Shawn Ashmore as Mike Weston, a young FBI agent who later becomes romantically involved with Ryan's niece, Max
- Valorie Curry as Emma Hill (seasons 1–2), a follower and romantic partner of Joe Carroll
- Nico Tortorella as Jacob Wells (season 1), one of Joe Carroll's followers and romantic interest of both Emma and Paul
- Adan Canto as Paul Torres (season 1), one of Joe Carroll's followers, working closely with Jacob and Emma
- Kyle Catlett as Joey Matthews (season 1), Joe Carroll and Claire Matthews' son
- Maggie Grace as Sarah Fuller (pilot), Joe Carroll's last victim before his capture
- James Purefoy as Joe Carroll, a former professor turned serial killer and cult leader
- Sam Underwood as Luke and Mark Gray (seasons 2–3), Lily's psychopathic twin sons
- Jessica Stroup as Max Hardy (seasons 2–3), niece of Ryan Hardy and a New York City Police Department detective
- Tiffany Boone as Mandy Lang (season 2), daughter of Judy, an admirer and daughter-figure to Joe Carroll who gets caught between him and Lily
- Connie Nielsen as Lily Gray (season 2), cult leader, admirer of Carroll, and mother of Luke and Mark
- Zuleikha Robinson as Gwen (season 3), an emergency room physician and Ryan Hardy's girlfriend
- Gregg Henry as Arthur Strauss (recurring season 2; starring season 3), a doctor and Joe Carroll's mentor who introduced him to killing
- Michael Ealy as Theo Noble (season 3), a follower of Dr. Strauss and a genius computer hacker. Strauss considers him his best student

=== Recurring cast ===
- John Lafayette as Scott Turner (seasons 1–3), head of the Marshals' detail participating in the investigation of Joe Carroll's cult, later provides protection for Claire Matthews
- Afton Williamson as Haley Mercury (season 1, guest star season 3), owner of an online fetish site who assists Ryan Hardy in tracking Joe Carroll's and Mark Gray's followers
- Valerie Cruz as Gina Mendez (seasons 2–3), an FBI agent who is head of the investigation on Joe Carroll and the new cults formed a year after his supposed death
- Mike Colter as Nick Donovan (seasons 1 & 3), an FBI agent who assumes command of the FBI team following Joe Carroll's second escape from prison
- Felix Solis as Jeff Clarke (seasons 2–3), an FBI special agent and Ryan Hardy's direct liaison to the director of the FBI

==== Season 1 ====
- Billy Brown as Troy Riley, an FBI agent who initially assisted Ryan Hardy in the days following Joe Carroll's escape from prison
- Chinasa Ogbuagu as Deirdre Mitchell, an FBI agent, specializing in following and tracking cult information on the computer
- Michael Drayer and Virginia Kull as Rick and Maggie Kester, followers of Joe Carroll
- Li Jun Li as Megan Leeds, hostage of Paul, Jacob, and Emma
- Warren Kole as Tim "Roderick" Nelson, Joe Carroll's friend and second in command of the cult
- Annika Boras as Louise Sinclair, follower of Joe Carroll and love interest of Roderick
- Jennifer Ferrin as Molly, one of Joe Carroll's followers, planted to develop a romantic relationship with Ryan Hardy
- Renée Elise Goldsberry as Olivia Warren, Joe Carroll's attorney
- Tom Lipinski as Charlie Mead, an ex-militant and member of Joe Carroll's cult assigned to stalk Claire Matthews in the years following Joe Carroll's incarceration
- Christopher Denham, Steve Monroe, and Arian Moayed as Vince McKinley, Jordy Raines, and David, followers of Joe Carroll

==== Season 2 ====
- Carrie Preston as Judy Lang, admirer of Joe Carroll with whom he lives for a year after going into hiding
- Camille De Pazzis as Giselle, adoptive daughter of Lily Gray.
- Bambadjan Bamba, Hugues Faustin and Rita Markova as Sami, Jamel and Radmilla, Lily Gray's adopted children
- Jake Weber and Jacinda Barrett as Micah and Julia, the leaders of the Korban cult
- Shane McRae, Mackenzie Marsh, Josh Salatin, and Liza de Weerd as Robert, Tilda, Lucas, and Angela, members of the Korban cult
- Leslie Bibb as Jana Murphy, a retired FBI agent, Gina's ex-girlfriend and a friend and helper of Joe Carroll
- Tom Cavanagh as Kingston Tanner, televangelist who denounces Joe Carroll
- Carter Jenkins as Preston Tanner, Kingston's son
- Sprague Grayden as Carrie Cooke, a tabloid reporter with an on-and-off relationship with Ryan Hardy

==== Season 3 ====
- Michael Irby as Andrew Sharp, ex-student of Arthur Strauss
- Gbenga Akinnagbe as Tom Reyes, Max's boyfriend who is also member of the FBI Hostage Rescue Team
- Ruth Kearney as Daisy Locke, ex-student of Arthur Strauss
- Monique Gabriela Curnen as Erin Sloan, an FBI tech analyst
- Hunter Parrish as Kyle Locke, ex-student of Arthur Strauss
- Glenn Fleshler as Neil Perry, ex-student of Arthur Strauss
- Anna Wood as Juliana Barnes, lawyer of Arthur Strauss
- Tim Guinee as Duncan Banks, ex-student of Arthur Strauss
- Susan Kelechi Watson as Cindy Noble, Theo's wife
- Megalyn Echikunwoke as Penny Tyler, Theo's adopted sister
- Diane Neal as Lisa Campbell, an FBI agent
- Annet Mahendru as Eliza

== Production ==
=== Conception ===
Bob and Harvey Weinstein approached Kevin Williamson in early 1999 to pursue a full script for a third installment of the Scream franchise, Scream 3. Unable to develop a full script for the production, Williamson instead wrote a 20- to 30-page draft outline for the film. The Weinsteins hired Arlington Road scribe Ehren Kruger to replace Williamson and helm writing duties, developing a script based on Williamson's notes.

The studio noted an increased scrutiny on the effects of violence in media and the effect it could have on the public in the aftermath of the Columbine High School massacre, which occurred shortly before production began on the film. Eager to avoid further criticism or connection to incidents like Columbine, Williamson's notes were largely discarded as the studio insisted that the script should focus on the comedic elements of the series while significantly reducing the violence.

Williamson then adapted his original draft as a television pitch, The Following, removing all references to the Scream franchise. Williamson pitched The Following to Fox rather than another company because it was "home of his all-time favorite show, 24". Comparing Hardy to Jack Bauer, he described the character as someone who "will die saving the moment" and "[carries] the weight of every victim on his shoulders".

Williamson knew he wanted to produce a show that would be gory and knew it would be controversial. When Fox Broadcasting chief operating officer Joe Earley was asked about the subject material, he answered that the network felt pressured to draw in a large audience to equal the broad scope and intensity of the narrative.

=== Writing ===
To slip gory scenes past the Standards and Practices department at Fox Broadcasting, Williamson explained, "There are tricks... Okay, in the same episode there's an actor cutting someone in the jugular, and you're harping on the sex scene? So I sent a little email to [Fox Entertainment chairman] Kevin Reilly, and within 15 minutes the broadcast-and-standards people were like, 'It's okay'".

=== Casting ===
Williamson wanted to cast "a tough guy with a boyish side" as Ryan Hardy and told his agent that he had someone like Kevin Bacon in mind for the role. When his agent suggested Bacon himself, Williamson discovered that Bacon had spent the past four years trying to find a television program he would like to do. Bacon described his attraction to the role as stemming from the way it centered on a life-or-death situation. Jeananne Goossen was cast in the role of FBI agent Jennifer Mason in the pilot, but the role was reworked and in subsequent episodes her character was written out and replaced by Special Agent Debra Parker, played by Annie Parisse.

=== Filming ===
The lighthouse scenes in the first season's finale were filmed at the Fire Island Lighthouse in Fire Island, New York.

== Episodes ==
Season	Episodes	Originally released	
Season	Episodes	First released	Last released
1	15	January 21, 2013	April 29, 2013
2	15	January 19, 2014	April 28, 2014
3	15	March 2, 2015	May 18, 2015

== Reception ==
=== Ratings ===
Including other digital sources, the premiere episode was watched by a total of 20.34 million viewers.

U.S. television ratings for The Following
Season	Timeslot (ET)	Number of episodes	Premiere		Finale		TV season	Overall rank	18–49 rank	Overall viewership
Season	Timeslot (ET)	Number of episodes	Date	Viewers (millions)	Date	Viewers (millions)	TV season	Overall rank	18–49 rank	Overall viewership
1	Monday 9:00 pm	15	January 21, 2013	10.42	April 29, 2013	7.82	2012–13	#22	#9	11.87
2	Monday 9:00 pm	15	January 19, 2014	11.18	April 28, 2014	4.81	2013–14	#45	#22	8.21
3	Monday 9:00 pm	15	March 2, 2015	4.86	May 18, 2015	3.05	2014–15			

=== Critical reception ===
Critical response of The Following
Season	Rotten Tomatoes	Metacritic
1	63% (51 reviews)	62 (35 reviews)
2	50% (18 reviews)	44 (9 reviews)
3	63% (8 reviews)	—N/a

USA Today's Robert Bianco rated the show highly, calling it "one of the most violent, and certainly the most frightening, series ever made by a commercial broadcast network," adding "some plot twists seem implausible at best, others are overdone or gratuitous. But some implausibility comes with the horror/suspense genre, and there's no question [Kevin] Williamson has mastered it — just as there's no question that the match of wills between the wounded [Kevin] Bacon and malevolent [James] Purefoy is exceedingly well played."

Ken Tucker of Entertainment Weekly stated: "The weakest part of The Following is the idea that Carroll was a college professor who held his classes spellbound with lectures about Thoreau, Emerson, and, most crucially, Edgar Allan Poe." He added: "The drama's strongest elements override this flaw. Both Bacon and Purefoy are so intensely earnest, The Following quickly supersedes its patent Silence of the Lambs setup. The moments that focus on Carroll's criminal cult give the series its real power, and the modern-day variations on Charlie Manson's kill-crazy crew are genuinely spooky."

The Wall Street Journal's Nancy Dewolf Smith considers the series "both better and worse than those movies where a procession of young people get killed so reliably and gorily that the audience laughs after it screams," adding, "There is some suspense here, even if it is mainly because the violence when it comes is so swift and sickening. But the show still feels slack. Is it a case of a serial-killer cliché too far?"

Hank Stuever of The Washington Post called the series "a trite, gratuitously violent exercise in still more stylishly imagined American horror stories." He added, "It is filled with melodramatic sleuthing that you've seen over and over."

Alessandra Stanley of The New York Times said the series was "hard to turn off and even harder to watch" and that "precisely because it is so bleak and relentlessly scary, The Following offers a more salutary depiction of violence than do series that use humor to mitigate horror — and thereby trivialize it."

=== Awards and accolades ===
Awards and accolades for The Following
Year	Association	Category	Nominated work	Result
2013	39th Saturn Awards	Best Network Television Series	The Following	Nominated
2013	39th Saturn Awards	Best Actor on Television	Kevin Bacon	Won (Note: Tied with Bryan Cranston for Breaking Bad)
2014	People's Choice Awards	Favorite Dramatic TV Actor	Kevin Bacon	Nominated
2014	40th Saturn Awards	Best Network Television Series	The Following	Nominated
2014	40th Saturn Awards	Best Actor on Television	Kevin Bacon	Nominated
2014	40th Saturn Awards	Best Supporting Actor on Television	James Purefoy	Nominated

=== Broadcasts ===
The series is broadcast in Canada through the CTV television system. For season three, the show will be broadcast on Canada's sibling specialty service Bravo. Internationally, it also airs on Nine Network in Australia, TF1 in France, Warner Channel in Latin America, SABC 3 in South Africa, Jack City in the Philippines, Canal+ & TVN7 in Poland, FOX in Portugal, and Sky Atlantic in the United Kingdom, and around 2015 will start to air in Colombia on Caracol Television.
