= All in the Family (Dexter) =

- Dexter episode
- Episode no.: Season 3 Episode 4
- Directed by: Keith Gordon
- Written by: Adam E. Fierro
- Cinematography by: Romeo Tirone
- Editing by: Louis Cioffi
- Original release date: October 19, 2008
- Running time: 54 minutes

Guest appearances
- Jimmy Smits as Miguel Prado (special guest star); Desmond Harrington as Joey Quinn; David Ramsey as Anton Briggs; Valerie Cruz as Sylvia Prado; Anne Ramsay as Ellen Wolf; Jason Manuel Olazabal as Ramon Prado; Liza Lapira as Yuki Amado; Kristin Dattilo as Barbara Gianna; Julie Ann Emery as Fiona Kemp; Miranda Frigon as Kim

Episode chronology
← Previous "The Lion Sleeps Tonight"	Next → "Turning Biminese"
- Dexter season 3

"All in the Family" is the fourth episode of the third season of the American crime drama television series Dexter. It is the 28th overall episode of the series and was written by consulting producer Adam E. Fierro, and was directed by Keith Gordon. It originally aired on Showtime on October 19, 2008.

Set in Miami, the series centers on Dexter Morgan, a forensic technician specializing in bloodstain pattern analysis for the fictional Miami Metro Police Department, who leads a secret parallel life as a vigilante serial killer, hunting down murderers who have not been adequately punished by the justice system due to corruption or legal technicalities. In the episode, Dexter tries to prevent Miguel from getting Ramon involved in their plans, while Debbie learns a new side of Quinn.

According to Nielsen Media Research, the episode was seen by an estimated 0.86 million household viewers and gained a 0.4/1 ratings share among adults aged 18–49. The episode received extremely positive reviews from critics, who praised the character development and performances, although some expressed criticism for the pacing.

== Plot ==
Dexter (Michael C. Hall) and Rita (Julie Benz) announce the latter's pregnancy to Astor (Christina Robinson) and Cody (Preston Bailey). Astor questions why they are not married, raising Dexter's curiosity. When he talks to Rita about it, she reveals that she only married Paul because of her pregnancy and only wants to get married if she knows it is because of love.

Ramón (Jason Manuel Olazabal) starts drinking heavily, causing Miguel (Jimmy Smits) to tell Dexter that they can tell him that Freebo is dead, but Dexter does not think it might be a good idea. Miami Metro investigates the death of Jack Rice, but his fiancée Fiona Kemp (Julie Ann Emery) does not cooperate. Debra (Jennifer Carpenter) is surprised when Quinn (Desmond Harrington) comforts Fiona. They eventually conclude Fiona was the murderer and that Quinn was using a strategy to get a confession out of her. Angel (David Zayas) goes to a motel room to have sex with a prostitute but discovers that the prostitute is working undercover as a vice detective. She identifies herself as Barbara Gianna (Kristin Dattilo) and takes him out of the room as it could ruin a sting operation.

Masuka is disappointed when no one but Dexter is interested in attending one of his conferences. When he asks Quinn about it, the latter explains that the department does not respect him because of his personality. LaGuerta (Lauren Vélez) is pressured by Ramón (Jason Manuel Olazabal) into investigating Freebo's whereabouts and decides to collaborate with Ellen Wolf (Anne Ramsay) in exonerating Chicky Hines despite Miguel (Jimmy Smits) telling her to cut it off. Dexter sets up Ramón by giving an anonymous tip to meet him with Miguel. When they arrive, Ramón turns aggressive, and Dexter uses the opportunity to frame him in a negative light. Miguel is disappointed to see he could not trust his own brother and apologizes to Dexter, calling him the only person he can trust. Dexter later visits Rita and, inspired by Fiona's acting, gives a speech to propose to her. Rita is moved and finally accepts his proposal.

== Production ==
=== Development ===
The episode was written by consulting producer Adam E. Fierro, and was directed by Keith Gordon. This was Fierro's first writing credit, and Gordon's fifth directing credit.

== Reception ==
=== Viewers ===
In its original American broadcast, "All in the Family" was seen by an estimated 0.86 million household viewers with a 0.4/1 in the 18–49 demographics. This means that 0.4 percent of all households with televisions watched the episode, while 1 percent of all of those watching television at the time of the broadcast watched it. This was a 20% decrease in viewership from the previous episode, which was watched by an estimated 1.07 million household viewers with a 0.5 in the 18–49 demographics.

=== Critical reviews ===
"All in the Family" received extremely positive reviews from critics. Matt Fowler of IGN gave the episode a "great" 8.4 out of 10, and wrote, "I wasn't too fond of this episode's running narrative about main characters and supporting players since it seemed a bit too winky - but I loved the scene where Dexter actually finds inspiration for his heartfelt proposal."

Scott Tobias of The A.V. Club gave the episode a "B" grade and wrote, "Though “All In The Family” had some of the weakest material in any of the four episodes so far, Dexter's fresh understanding that he's an actor in a play was captivating to behold." Jeffrey Bloomer of Paste wrote, "Elsewhere, if this was not exactly the strongest episode of the season, it did finally allow for a subplot confined to a single episode, which used to be a touchstone of the series. The murder investigation felt like it could have come from any of the many investigation series now on television, but it at least afforded the show a measure of dramatic relief, the sense the characters still have jobs outside of the show's primary mechanics."

Alan Sepinwall wrote, "Either he has a strong understanding of social cues and what makes people tick, or he doesn't. And here, his behavior seemed less about being true to who Dexter is than to serving the needs of the script. Because of that inconsistency, I couldn't even really appreciate Michael C. Hall and Julie Benz's work in the scene where Dexter finally proposes the right way." Paula Paige of TV Guide wrote, "He knows he is merely acting, but wonders if it might ever be real. Dexter is still finding a skin that allows him to fit in."

Debra McDuffee of TV Squad wrote, "I'm really enjoying Dexter this season, so far. Although it seems to have a slightly different tone than past seasons, it continues to hold my rapt attention with its amazing character development and intricate plotlines." Television Without Pity gave the episode a "B" grade.
