= Dexter season 3 =

Drama series

Dexter
- Season 3
- DVD cover
- Showrunner: Clyde Phillips
- Starring: Michael C. Hall; Julie Benz; Jennifer Carpenter; C. S. Lee; Lauren Vélez; David Zayas; James Remar
- No. of episodes: 12

Release
- Original network: Showtime
- Original release: September 28 – December 14, 2008

Season chronology
- ← Previous; Season 2 Next → Season 4

The third season of Dexter premiered on September 28, 2008, and ended on December 14, 2008. "Our Father", the season premiere, attracted 1.22 million viewers in the United States, making it Showtime's highest-rated drama season premiere since Nielsen Media Research began compiling ratings in 2004. The season finale "Do You Take Dexter Morgan?" attracted 1.5 million viewers. Season three was watched by an average of 1.1 million viewers a week.

In this season, Dexter kills a man in self-defense and initiates a friendship with the man's brother, Assistant District Attorney Miguel Prado (Jimmy Smits). In the meantime, Rita discovers that she is pregnant, and Debra investigates the murders of a new serial killer called "The Skinner", hoping to gain a promotion to detective. In addition to Smits, Dexter's third season introduces two recurring characters: Desmond Harrington as Det. Joey Quinn, who becomes Debra's partner when he is transferred from the narcotics department to homicide, and Anne Ramsay as Ellen Wolf, a defense attorney whom Miguel detests.

It received largely positive reviews from critics, which ranged from being praised as "truly and incredibly exciting television" in the San Francisco Chronicle, to "lack[ing] the crackling tension the drama had supplied in previous years" by the Chicago Tribune; the aggregate site Metacritic scored the season at 78 out of 100 based on 13 reviews. Smits and Hall received Emmy nominations for their roles as Miguel Prado and Dexter Morgan respectively, while the show as a whole also received a Best Drama Emmy nomination.

== Plot ==
Rita discovers she is pregnant, informing Dexter that she will keep the baby and raise him with or without his help. He ends up proposing marriage to Rita, which she eventually accepts.

While stalking a murderous drug dealer, "Freebo", Dexter stumbles upon a fight between Freebo and another man, whom he is forced to kill in self-defense. This is the first time Dexter kills someone of whose guilt he wasn't completely sure. This victim turns out to be Oscar Prado, brother of Miguel Prado (Jimmy Smits), a prominent assistant district attorney and old flame of Lt. LaGuerta. Miguel comes to confide in and trust Dexter after he helps assist with the case. Dexter tracks down Freebo and kills him, but as he leaves he encounters Miguel, who has followed a lead to Freebo's location. Dexter tells Miguel he had discovered Freebo and killed him in self-defense, but instead of reprimanding him, Miguel thanks him and offers to help him cover up the crime. As Dexter and Miguel cooperate to conceal Freebo's true demise from everyone else, the duo end up becoming close friends, as do Rita and Miguel's wife, Sylvia.

Miguel feeds Dexter information regarding a killer who continually gets away with it, in hopes Dexter will once again take matters into his own hands. When he discovers that Dexter indeed took such action, he realizes what Dexter was doing and encourages him. Miguel hopes they can form a partnership and wants to be more hands-on in the future, with the guidance of Dexter. Trying to discourage Miguel, Dexter proposes a risky operation to free an infamous Aryan Brotherhood leader from prison in order to kill him. Miguel agrees with the idea and the plan succeeds. Dexter starts to recognize Miguel as his first and only true friend, to the point of inviting him to be his best man at his wedding.

Debra starts working more seriously to earn her detective shield, and also starts working with a new partner, Joey Quinn. They investigate a serial killer, "The Skinner", who skins his victims alive. She also starts a relationship with Anton Briggs, one of Quinn's confidential informants.

Miguel and Dexter's partnership takes a new step when Miguel asks to be the one to kill their next target. With some reluctance, Dexter agrees, only watching as Miguel kills without hesitation. The next day, Ellen Wolf, a ruthless defense attorney and old courtroom adversary of Miguel's, goes missing, and Dexter discovers that Miguel has killed her alone. Dexter also learns that Miguel has been manipulating him since the beginning.

Dexter and Miguel both try to gain leverage over the other, with Dexter leaving Wolf's body to be discovered and investigated, while Miguel starts an investigation into Anton (the key witness to identifying the Skinner) and Deb's relationship. Dexter eventually realizes that Miguel cannot be allowed to run loose any longer, at which point Dexter decides to kill him and make it look like The Skinner did it. Meanwhile, Miguel uses his position to help The Skinner escape police custody in return for his agreeing to kill Dexter. Striving to discover the truth about Wolf's death, LaGuerta ends up obtaining evidence which links Miguel to the crime. Miguel discovers that LaGuerta was investigating him and decides to kill her, but Dexter discovers Miguel's plot and captures him. Before killing Miguel, Dexter confesses to him that he was the one who killed Oscar.

After Miguel's body is discovered, he is immediately identified as a victim of The Skinner, just as Dexter planned. Miguel's other brother, Ramon, however, becomes suspicious of Dexter. After pointing a gun at Dexter during a dinner with Rita, he is taken into custody. During a visit to him in jail, Dexter helps Ramon put his demons to rest.

On the night before his wedding, Dexter is captured by The Skinner, but breaks free by taking advantage of a moment when the Skinner is distracted, shattering his hand in the process. After a short but vicious fight, Dexter snaps The Skinner's neck and makes it look like suicide by dumping his body in front of a moving police car. Dexter gets his broken hand put in a cast and attends his wedding.

== Cast ==
=== Main cast ===
- Michael C. Hall as Dexter Morgan
- Julie Benz as Rita Bennett
- Jennifer Carpenter as Debra Morgan
- C. S. Lee as Vince Masuka
- Lauren Vélez as María LaGuerta
- David Zayas as Angel Batista
- James Remar as Harry Morgan

=== Special guest star ===
- Jimmy Smits as Miguel Prado

=== Recurring cast ===
- Desmond Harrington as Joey Quinn
- David Ramsey as Anton Briggs
- Valerie Cruz as Sylvia Prado
- Kristin Dattilo as Barbara Gianna
- Jason Manuel Olazabal as Ramon Prado
- Christina Robinson as Astor Bennett
- Preston Bailey as Cody Bennett
- Jesse Borrego as Jorge Orozco / George King
- Anne Ramsay as Ellen Wolf
- Liza Lapira as Yuki Amado
- Sage Kirkpatrick as Laura Moser
- Margo Martindale as Camilla Figg
- Tasia Sherel as Francis

=== Guest cast ===
- Marc John Jefferies as Wendell Owens
- Jane McLean as Tammy Okama
- Vincent Pagano as Toby Edwards
- Jerry Zatarain as Mario Estorga
- Mike Erwin as Fred "Freebo" Bowman
- Nick Hermz as Oscar Prado
- Ray Santiago as Javier Garza
- Jelly Howie as Teegan Campbell
- Larry Sullivan as Ethan Turner
- Blake Gibbons as Clemson Galt
- Jeff Chase as Billy Fleeter

== Crew ==
Longstanding executive producers John Goldwyn, Sara Colleton and Clyde Phillips all returned for the third season. They were joined by new executive producer Charles H. Eglee. Eglee was accompanied by consulting producer Adam E. Fierro, the two had previously worked together on The Shield. Second season co-executive producers Scott Buck and Melissa Rosenberg retained their roles. Series star Michael C. Hall also became a co-executive producer for the third season. Executive Story Editor Timothy Schlattmann and Story Editor Lauren Gussis were promoted to the production team as producer and co-producer respectively. Robert Lloyd Lewis returned as the on set producer. Gary Law joined the production team as a co-producer mid-season. Chad Tomasoski remained an associate producer.

== Episodes ==
No. overall	No. in season	Title	Directed by	Written by	Original release date	U.S. viewers (millions)
25	1	"Our Father"	Keith Gordon	Clyde Phillips	September 28, 2008	1.22
Several months after the second season finale, Dexter hunts down drug dealer Fred "Freebo" Bowman but mistakenly kills an innocent man who happens to be the younger brother of Assistant District Attorney Miguel Prado. Dexter frames Freebo, but begins to question the necessity of his father's code. Meanwhile, Debra has reformed her life and is determined to become a detective, but refuses a request from an Internal Affairs officer to co-operate in an investigation of Quinn. Quinn introduces Debra to his informant, Anton Briggs, with hopes of finding clues to Freebo's whereabouts. Rita realizes that she is pregnant.
26	2	"Finding Freebo"	Marcos Siega	Melissa Rosenberg	October 5, 2008	0.79
Dexter and Rita try to decide what to do about her pregnancy, as Dexter wonders whether he is fit to raise a child and commit to a family. However, Rita decides that they should keep the baby. Meanwhile, Debra tries to identify a body, which Dexter recognizes as that of Freebo's girlfriend, Teegan Campbell; however, Debra later learns her identity from a different pimp. Realizing that Freebo must have killed her, Dexter assumes that Freebo is still in town and tracks him down to Teegan's house, where he kills him. Miguel also searches for Freebo, seeking revenge for his brother's death, and finds Dexter after he has killed Freebo. Dexter confesses to killing Freebo in self-defense, and manages to convince Miguel to leave before he can discover his identity. The Internal Affairs officer continues in her attempts to get Debra to take part in the investigation. Angel and Quinn arrest a drug dealer who offers an alibi for a convicted carjacker, who was prosecuted by Miguel. Dexter tells Angel about Rita's pregnancy, and Angel shares his joys of fatherhood with him.
27	3	"The Lion Sleeps Tonight"	John Dahl	Scott Buck	October 12, 2008	1.07
Dexter starts questioning the inclusiveness of Harry's code when he realizes that Nathan Marten is a pedophile targeting Astor. A second murder victim, skinned in a similar manner to Teegan, is discovered. Knowing that the victim couldn't have been killed by Freebo, Dexter helps Debra to identify the body in hope of proving that Freebo was not the culprit. After Dexter tells Debra that Rita is pregnant, Debra offers Dexter advice on fatherhood. Debra arrests Anton when he refuses to co-operate in the investigation and he lights a joint of cannabis in front of her.
28	4	"All in the Family"	Keith Gordon	Adam E. Fierro	October 19, 2008	0.86
After an unsuccessful marriage proposal, Dexter must convince Rita that he is looking for more than a convenient merger of finances and parenthood. Miguel's brother, Ramon, criticizes the police for not finding his brother's killer, and when Miguel suggests telling Ramon the truth, Dexter realizes that he must prove that Ramon cannot be trusted. After a short-tempered outburst at a hotel guest, Rita is dismissed from her job, leaving her wondering whether she will ever have a real career. Debra and Quinn are assigned to the case of a man who was killed by his fiancée. Angel becomes entangled in a sting operation when he picks up a prostitute who is actually Vice Detective Barbara Gianna.
29	5	"Turning Biminese"	Marcos Siega	Tim Schlattmann	October 26, 2008	1.00
Miguel tells Dexter of Ethan Turner, a man who has killed two of his wives. After he decides that Turner fits Harry's code, Dexter tries to find Turner in Bimini. Rita is hospitalized after a medical emergency, and Dexter cannot be found. On Dexter's return and Turner's reported disappearance, Miguel asks Dexter whether he killed Turner. Debra finds herself oddly attracted to Anton whilst working with him on finding one of Freebo's confidants. Dexter is hesitant to agree when Rita suggests that they buy a house and move in together.
30	6	"Sí Se Puede"	Ernest Dickerson	Charles H. Eglee	November 2, 2008	1.04
Miguel discovers Dexter has killed at least two people and shows acceptance of his unique outlook. Dexter's true body count and his alternative identity remain unknown to Miguel. Dexter tries to distract Miguel with a plan to release a jailed murderer and kill him, but soon realizes that Miguel has a far darker plan for his vigilantism than Dexter could have imagined. Debra is upset when she realizes that she may be partially responsible for the death of Freebo's skinned doorman, Wendell Owens. Dexter is distressed when he learns that his old friend Camilla Figg is dying of cancer. Angel asks Barbara out on a date. Sylvia invites Rita to work alongside her as an estate agent. Debra and Quinn apprehend Ramon when they find him torturing people he believes know the whereabouts of Freebo. After Quinn praises Debra's work in front of LaGuerta, Debra tells him about the internal affairs investigation into him.
31	7	"Easy as Pie"	Steve Shill	Lauren Gussis	November 9, 2008	0.83
Miguel suggests Ellen as a potential victim to Dexter, but after properly vetting her, Dexter believes that she does not fit Harry's code. Miguel's wife, Sylvia, tells Rita that she suspects Miguel of having an extramarital affair. Debra reveals to Anton that he is being used as bait to lure The Skinner and decides to find the murderer another way. After finding a lead in tree trimmers, Debra sees Anton and they kiss. Camilla asks Dexter for help in ending her life. Dexter struggles to write a list of his friends to invite to the wedding.
32	8	"The Damage a Man Can Do"	Marcos Siega	Scott Buck	November 16, 2008	0.96
Miguel finds Dexter another victim, a debt enforcer called Billy Fleeter, whom Miguel wishes to kill. Debra discovers that The Skinner is a tree-trimmer and learns that Anton was never registered as an informant. When she tells him that he was never legally obliged to work for the police, he disappears. Rita loses control due to her pregnancy hormones and is angry at Dexter's refusal to help organize their wedding. LaGuerta has drinks with Ellen Wolf to discuss her concerns about Miguel's conduct regarding past cases. After Dexter and Miguel work together on their latest project, Miguel makes an unannounced visit to Ellen's house.
33	9	"About Last Night"	Tim Hunter	Story by : Scott Reynolds; Teleplay by : Melissa Rosenberg	November 23, 2008	1.13
In the wake of Ellen's disappearance, Dexter fears that Miguel may have strayed from Harry's code and killed her, in spite of what Dexter tried to teach him. Dexter tries to prove that he is still in control to Miguel, but realizes that Miguel had been dishonest from the beginning of their friendship. Rita confronts Miguel about his actions when Sylvia becomes convinced that Miguel is having an affair. Debra realizes that Anton has been kidnapped by The Skinner, whom the police believe to be George King. Unfortunately, the only witness, King's employee Mario, is too afraid to talk to the police.
34	10	"Go Your Own Way"	John Dahl	Tim Schlattmann	November 30, 2008	1.34
After realizing that he was manipulated by Miguel, Dexter cannot gain the upper hand as Miguel threatens to launch an ethics investigation into Debra's relationship with Anton, a key witness in her case. Having rescued Anton after his encounter with The Skinner, she wonders if their relationship is worth jeopardizing her career for. Dexter takes Ellen's ring, a memento of the kill, from Miguel's house to use as evidence against him. Dexter also takes Miguel's shirt stained supposedly by Freebo's blood to a laundry shop. Angel is on the warpath after Barbara is attacked, and Dexter gets into trouble with LaGuerta for running the blood without a case tag. Rita tells Sylvia that Miguel is having an affair with LaGuerta, while Miguel contacts The Skinner and tells him that Dexter is the only person who knows Freebo's whereabouts.
35	11	"I Had a Dream"	Marcos Siega	Charles H. Eglee and Lauren Gussis	December 7, 2008	1.34
Dexter struggles to distance himself from Miguel, who will be his best man at his wedding, and starts plotting to kill him. LaGuerta begins to believe that Miguel is Ellen's killer, and searches his car for forensic evidence after inviting him over for dinner. Miguel realizes that LaGuerta suspects him of Ellen's murder, and decides to kill her. When Debra starts avoiding Anton, Dexter tells her of their father's affair with his informant, Laura Moser, without revealing that she was also Dexter's biological mother. Debra discovers The Skinner's whereabouts, but he escapes when Quinn is injured. Dexter's relationship with Miguel comes to a violent end.
36	12	"Do You Take Dexter Morgan?"	Keith Gordon	Scott Buck	December 14, 2008	1.51
After killing Miguel and framing The Skinner, Dexter is targeted by Ramon. LaGuerta tries to persuade Dexter to expose Miguel as a murderer when she learns that a highway will be named after Miguel. Angel's recommendation of Debra for promotion to detective is threatened when Angel learns that Debra slept with Anton. Dexter discovers that Rita has been married twice before, once when she was sixteen, which she hid from him. Dexter is captured and held prisoner by The Skinner, who demands to know Freebo's whereabouts, but Dexter escapes (and kills him) in time for his wedding.
