= Sí Se Puede (Dexter) =

- Dexter episode
- Episode no.: Season 3 Episode 6
- Directed by: Ernest Dickerson
- Written by: Charles H. Eglee
- Cinematography by: Romeo Tirone
- Editing by: Matthew V. Colonna
- Original release date: November 2, 2008
- Running time: 54 minutes

Guest appearances
- Jimmy Smits as Miguel Prado (special guest star); Desmond Harrington as Joey Quinn; David Ramsey as Anton Briggs; Valerie Cruz as Sylvia Prado; Anne Ramsay as Ellen Wolf; Jason Manuel Olazabal as Ramon Prado; Liza Lapira as Yuki Amado; Kristin Dattilo as Barbara Gianna; Margo Martindale as Camilla Figg; Marc John Jefferies as Wendell Owens

Episode chronology
← Previous "Turning Biminese"	Next → "Easy as Pie"
- Dexter season 3

"Sí Se Puede" is the sixth episode of the third season of the American crime drama television series Dexter. It is the 30th overall episode of the series and was written by executive producer Charles H. Eglee, and was directed by Ernest Dickerson. It originally aired on Showtime on November 2, 2008.

Set in Miami, the series centers on Dexter Morgan, a forensic technician specializing in bloodstain pattern analysis for the fictional Miami Metro Police Department, who leads a secret parallel life as a vigilante serial killer, hunting down murderers who have not been adequately punished by the justice system due to corruption or legal technicalities. In the episode, Dexter and Miguel work together in pursuing a white supremacist, but Dexter questions if Miguel is ready. Meanwhile, Debra suspects that Ramón Prado might be The Skinner.

According to Nielsen Media Research, the episode was seen by an estimated 1.04 million household viewers and gained a 0.5 ratings share among adults aged 18–49. The episode received extremely positive reviews from critics, who praised the scenes between Dexter and Miguel.

== Plot ==
Dexter (Michael C. Hall) and Miguel (Jimmy Smits) hang out in Dexter's boat, and Miguel asks him how he feels about killing Ethan Turner. Dexter said that "it felt right," delighting Miguel. Dexter then has an imaginary conversation with Harry (James Remar), who states he cannot get Miguel involved in his life. Miami Metro discovers that The Skinner has killed Wendell after talking with the police. Debra is shaken as she talks with Wendell and Garza before their deaths and wonders if Ramón (Jason Manuel Olazabal) might be the Skinner. She confides this to Angel (David Zayas) and Quinn (Desmond Harrington), and they agree to investigate without notifying anyone else. LaGuerta (Lauren Vélez) is surprised when she finds that Ellen Wolf (Anne Ramsay) is investigating Miguel for misconduct and refuses to help her. She also informs Dexter that Camilla Figg (Margo Martindale) is dying from terminal lung cancer. Dexter visits her, and she explains that her only wish before her death is to eat the "perfect key lime pie."

Dexter suggests targeting Clemson Galt, a white supremacist who killed a pregnant woman but only went to prison for robbery, yet he continues operating from within. Dexter is surprised when Miguel agrees to help him, using his influence to help Galt escape prison. Yuki Amado (Liza Lapira) pressures Debra into wearing a wire to get information from Quinn, or she will expose her cover. Sylvia (Valerie Cruz) offers Rita (Julie Benz) to work with her in real estate, and she accepts. Angel once again asks Barbara (Kristin Dattilo) on a date; while she initially declines, she eventually accepts to go out with him.

Debra follows Ramón, witnessing him put a man in his trunk. She and Quinn follow him, finding him torturing the man, a supplier for Freebo. They conclude he is not The Skinner but arrest him nevertheless for the kidnapping. After Quinn praises Debra's work in front of LaGuerta, Debra tells him about the internal affairs investigation into him. Quinn is not bothered, telling her Yuki is simply trying to get back at him. Dexter takes Galt and kills him but tricks Miguel into going to another location, as he fears he will not be the same when he takes part in the killing.

== Production ==
=== Development ===
The episode was written by executive producer Charles H. Eglee, and was directed by Ernest Dickerson. This was Eglee's first writing credit, and Dickerson's first directing credit.

== Reception ==
=== Viewers ===
In its original American broadcast, "Sí Se Puede" was seen by an estimated 1.04 million household viewers with a 0.5 in the 18–49 demographics. This means that 0.5 percent of all households with televisions watched the episode. This was a 4% increase in viewership from the previous episode, which was watched by an estimated 1.00 million household viewers with a 0.5 in the 18–49 demographics.

=== Critical reviews ===
"Sí Se Puede" received extremely positive reviews from critics. Matt Fowler of IGN gave the episode an "amazing" 9.2 out of 10, and wrote, "Two stand out scenes for me in this one. First, the terrific pairing of Dexter and Camilla, the clerk that was so helpful to him in Season 1, who is now dying of lung cancer. In a nice twist, Dexter vows to help someone find dignity in their death, by trying to find her the ultimate slice of key lime pie. The other scene was a little scary, because it involved the inner rage of Miguel. His fury regarding Defense Attorney Ellen Wolf was a little creepy. Not just because of his anger, but because it left me thinking that there was no "just" side to our justice system, except for Dexter. I know, not exactly anything new there."

Scott Tobias of The A.V. Club gave the episode a "B–" grade and wrote, "There's only one show in the history of television about a blood spatter analyst who moonlights as a serial killer of serial killers. And there are a million mediocre shows — many on CBS, probably right as I'm typing — about a detective unit solving grisly crimes in a major city. It's a little disconcerting that an excellent show and a mediocre show could come from the same writing staff, with excellence and mediocrity often competing for time in a single episode, but such has always been the case with Dexter." Jeffrey Bloomer of Paste wrote, "We're halfway through Dexter's third season, and if this week's episode felt a little inorganic, it served to clean up a series of plot points that had been unfocused over the last five episodes."

Alan Sepinwall wrote, "Kind of a muddled episode that typified what's been to me, unfortunately, a muddled season." Paula Paige of TV Guide wrote, "He's ready to share the catching of the killers with his new BFF, but not necessarily the killing and dissecting. The ritual is a connection and is for Dexter and Dexter alone."

Debra McDuffee of TV Squad wrote, "Dexter has shared more than he ever has and I am starting to trust Miguel... or am I? Have we, like Dexter implied when he said he knew everything there is to know about Miguel Prado, gotten down to the reasons why we didn't trust Miguel? Yep, he's a shady ADA, but does he really mean no harm to Dexter? Time will tell if he really is Dexter's first true friend. This storyline just gets more and more interesting, and I love the way it is unfolding." Television Without Pity gave the episode a "B" grade.

Ernest Dickerson submitted this episode for consideration for Outstanding Directing for a Drama Series at the 61st Primetime Emmy Awards.
