= Easy as Pie (Dexter) =

- Dexter episode
- Episode no.: Season 3 Episode 7
- Directed by: Steve Shill
- Written by: Lauren Gussis
- Cinematography by: Romeo Tirone
- Editing by: Louis Cioffi
- Original release date: November 9, 2008
- Running time: 58 minutes

Guest appearances
- Jimmy Smits as Miguel Prado (special guest star); Desmond Harrington as Joey Quinn; David Ramsey as Anton Briggs; Valerie Cruz as Sylvia Prado; Anne Ramsay as Ellen Wolf; Jason Manuel Olazabal as Ramon Prado; Liza Lapira as Yuki Amado; Kristin Dattilo as Barbara Gianna; Margo Martindale as Camilla Figg; Dee Freeman as Mrs. Owens

Episode chronology
← Previous "Sí Se Puede"	Next → "The Damage a Man Can Do"
- Dexter season 3

"Easy as Pie" is the seventh episode of the third season of the American crime drama television series Dexter. It is the 31st overall episode of the series and was written by co-producer Lauren Gussis, and was directed by Steve Shill. It originally aired on Showtime on November 9, 2008.

Set in Miami, the series centers on Dexter Morgan, a forensic technician specializing in bloodstain pattern analysis for the fictional Miami Metro Police Department, who leads a secret parallel life as a vigilante serial killer, hunting down murderers who have not been adequately punished by the justice system due to corruption or legal technicalities. In the episode, Dexter is pressured by Miguel in targeting Ellen Wolf, while Camilla's condition worsens.

According to Nielsen Media Research, the episode was seen by an estimated 0.83 million household viewers and gained a 0.4 ratings share among adults aged 18–49. The episode received extremely positive reviews from critics, who praised the emotional tone and performances in the episode.

== Plot ==
Rita (Julie Benz) asks Dexter (Michael C. Hall) to make a guest list for the wedding, but Dexter struggles because he has few friends. Dexter later visits Camilla (Margo Martindale), who has been moved to a hospice as her condition worsens. She makes him arrange her funeral while reminding him to find the perfect key lime pie before she dies.

Ramón (Jason Manuel Olazabal) is released without charge but is forced to begin his retirement early. To lure The Skinner, Angel (David Zayas) wants to use Anton (David Ramsey) to attract him, worrying Debra (Jennifer Carpenter). Wendell's mother also scolds Debra, who blames her for her son's death. Miguel (Jimmy Smits) talks to Dexter about his dissatisfaction with the system ruining prosections. He suggests targeting Ellen Wolf (Anne Ramsay) for participating, but Dexter refuses because she does not fit the Code. Camilla is given another month to live, but she does not want to experience the pain. Unable to commit suicide, she asks Dexter to euthanize her, leaving Dexter conflicted over the idea of killing an innocent person.

Miami Metro investigates a new murder, and Masuka (C. S. Lee) quickly recognizes that the perpetrator is Albert Chung, a man with a criminal record. During the investigation, Miguel and Ellen had a conflict over the case. At home, Miguel once again asks Dexter to kill Ellen. When he refuses, Miguel angrily kicks him out. Yuki (Liza Lapira) tells Debra that the Internal Affairs investigation into Quinn (Desmond Harrington) is now closed because Debra informed him, remarking that an officer died because of him. Debra also ignores the police's protocol and warns Anton, but he decides to stay. After finding a lead in tree trimmers, Debra visits Anton, and they kiss.

Sylvia (Valerie Cruz) confides in Rita that Miguel might have an affair, but Dexter reassures them that that is untrue. LaGuerta (Lauren Vélez) cooperates with Ellen to secure Chung's rendition. Dexter and Miguel meet, and the latter apologizes for his actions. Dexter then asks Miguel to be his best man at the wedding, and he accepts. Dexter visits Camilla, who has already decided he could not go forward with the euthanasia, revealing she earlier concluded his brother Brian was the Ice Truck Killer. Dexter gives her a new key lime pie, injecting it with sodium thiopental to euthanize her. As she dies, Dexter confesses to killing Brian, and Camilla considers he was right in doing it.

== Production ==
=== Development ===
The episode was written by co-producer Lauren Gussis, and was directed by Steve Shill. This was Gussis' third writing credit, and Shill's fourth directing credit.

== Reception ==
=== Viewers ===
In its original American broadcast, "Easy as Pie" was seen by an estimated 0.83 million household viewers with a 0.4 in the 18–49 demographics. This means that 0.4 percent of all households with televisions watched the episode. This was a 21% decrease in viewership from the previous episode, which was watched by an estimated 1.04 million household viewers with a 0.5 in the 18–49 demographics.

=== Critical reviews ===
"Easy as Pie" received extremely positive reviews from critics. Matt Fowler of IGN gave the episode a "great" 8.8 out of 10, and wrote, "We've seen Dexter wash his hands clean of Harry, and some of the old "code" that he was taught - so it would entirely possibly for Dexter to throw the rules aside, and help out a friend in need, and kill a conniving D.A. that lets murderers and rapists go free. But he won't."

Scott Tobias of The A.V. Club gave the episode a "B+" grade and wrote, "Miguel is an unstable character: He's gung-ho about having a guy like Dexter as a friend and he feels like he has a powerful weapon to bypass a failed justice system. But we hear from his wife that he's been unusually temperamental, and it's possible that his association with Dexter has played more on his conscience than he's let on. And for Dexter, friendship is a luxury that perhaps easily diminished; the second he loses trust in Miguel, it stands to get awfully bloody." Jeffrey Bloomer of Paste wrote, "Maybe we put too much stock into Miguel's character. His wife's suspicion that he has a lover and the increasing friction between them don't seem especially relevant now, but since they occupy so much time as the season moves into its final episodes, they will clearly play a role. Dexter has always thrived on big reveals, and we expect one soon."

Alan Sepinwall wrote, "In case you hadn't noticed it by now, that Michael C. Hall is kind of a good actor, isn't he? Even though the outcome of the Dexter/Camilla story never really seemed in doubt, Hall and Margo Martindale played the hell out of it, as Camilla pleaded for a painless death and Dexter wrestled with whether The Code of Harry was elastic enough to give it to her. Very touching work by both, and I loved that Dexter confessed to Brian's murder because he couldn't let Camilla's final thoughts of him to be completely pure." Paula Paige of TV Guide wrote, "Dexter feeds Camilla her last bites of key-lime pie. "You finally brought me the perfect pie." And so we say goodbye to Camilla."

Debra McDuffee of TV Squad wrote, "A lot of significant events happened in tonight's episode of Dexter. What to make of the title, "Easy As Pie?" I think it refers to Dexter being able to make decisions. All his life, he's lived by Harry's code. Now, as we see him breaking it, or deciding whether or not he should break it, we see things being easier for Dexter." Television Without Pity gave the episode a "B" grade.

Steve Shill submitted this episode for consideration for Outstanding Directing for a Drama Series at the 61st Primetime Emmy Awards.
