= The Damage a Man Can Do =

- Dexter episode
- Episode no.: Season 3 Episode 8
- Directed by: Marcos Siega
- Written by: Scott Buck
- Production code: 308
- Original air date: November 16, 2008

Guest appearances
- Jimmy Smits as Miguel Prado (special guest star); Desmond Harrington as Joey Quinn; David Ramsey as Anton Briggs; Valerie Cruz as Sylvia Prado; Anne Ramsay as Ellen Wolf; Kristin Dattilo as Barbara Gianna; Jesse Borrego as George King; Jeff Chase as Billy Fleeter; Christina Robinson as Astor Bennett; Preston Bailey as Cody Bennett

Episode chronology
← Previous "Easy as Pie"	Next → "About Last Night"
- Dexter (season 3)

"The Damage a Man Can Do" is the eighth episode of the third season of the American television drama series Dexter, which first aired on November 16, 2008 on Showtime in the United States. The episode was written by Scott Buck and directed by Marcos Siega. In the episode, assistant district attorney Miguel Prado (Jimmy Smits) asks Dexter Morgan (Michael C. Hall) for his assistance in killing a murderous gambler. Meanwhile, Dexter's sister Ofr. Debra Morgan (Jennifer Carpenter) finds her boyfriend and informant Anton Briggs (David Ramsey) to be missing after she tells him that he is no longer legally obligated to work for her.

The episode marked the first time that another character had joined Dexter with a victim in one of his murder scenes. While filming this scene during October 2008, Smits accidentally stabbed stunt man Jeff Chase with a real knife rather than the scene's prop knife. The knife struck a small piece of plastic on Chase's chest and he was unharmed. "The Damage a Man Can Do" received generally positive reviews from critics.

== Plot ==
Miguel introduces Dexter to former football player Billy Fleeter (Jeff Chase), a debt enforcer who kills other gamblers to pay off his own debts. Dexter is initially hesitant when Miguel suggests that Dexter teach him how to murder Fleeter, but the two go to a casino where Dexter tries to explain Harry's "code" to Miguel. They later break into Fleeter's house and, although they find the murder weapon, Dexter says that they need evidence proving that Fleeter has the incentive to kill again. Dexter finds a ledger recording each of Fleeter's bets and returns with Miguel to the casino, where they prepare an unused storeroom for Fleeter's murder.

Before they move to kill Fleeter, somebody recognizes Miguel in the casino and Dexter calls off the plan. Dexter is angered when Miguel criticizes Harry's code, but he agrees to go ahead with the murder after Miguel mentions that he severely beat his own abusive father and found it to be one of the most satisfying moments of his life. They drug Fleeter and take him to the storeroom, when Miguel stabs and kills him. While cleaning up the crime scene, Dexter has a vision in which his father tells him that sharing the code was a mistake and that Dexter is now responsible for Miguel's actions.

Debra finds a hidden bag of marijuana in Anton's apartment and asks Quinn about his previous charges for drug possession. She discovers that Anton had been working for Quinn unofficially and that he is not legally obligated to disclose any information to the police. After telling Anton that he no longer has to work as an informant due to a "clerical error", he disappears. Debra and Quinn continue to work the Skinner case, believing that the suspect may be a tree-trimmer. One of the contractors they interview, George King (Jesse Borrego), tells Debra about one of his suspicious workers, Mario (Jerry Zatarain). When Mario tries to flee, Debra and Quinn arrest him. Mario pleads to be sent back to Nicaragua at the mention of King's name. Debra later visits Anton's apartment and realizes that he has been taken by The Skinner, who recently trimmed the trees.

Rita is unusually temperamental due to her pregnancy. She complains to Miguel's wife Syl (Valerie Cruz) that Dexter refuses to help with the organization of their upcoming wedding. Despite having told Dexter that she did not want an engagement ring, Debra and Dexter choose one for Rita, and she apologizes for her behavior. Meanwhile, defense attorney Ellen Wolf (Anne Ramsay) tells LaGuerta that she thinks that Miguel is going out of his way to make her job harder. After killing Fleeter, Miguel makes an unannounced visit to Ellen's house.

== Production ==
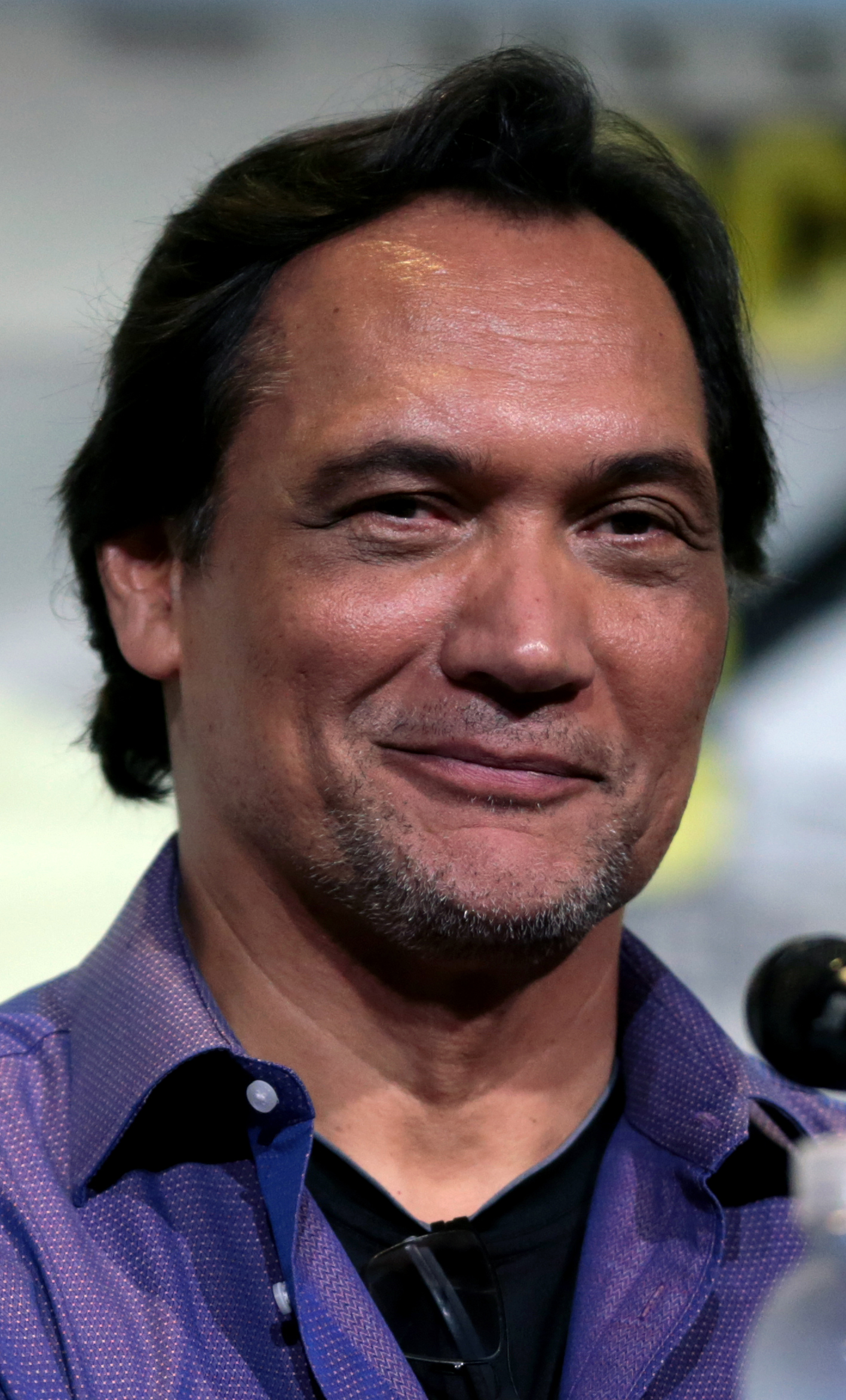
Jimmy Smits accidentally stabbed a stunt man with a real knife while filming the episode

"The Damage a Man Can Do" was filmed in early October 2008. On playing Harry as a figment of Dexter's imagination, James Remar told Vanity Fair that "it's challenging to play a specter in somebody’s current existence." He said: "In my own life, I find myself doing some task [...] and having a conversation with my mother or father, who are both deceased. [...] I suspect lots of people do it. And when I hold that conversation, different images of my parents appear to me. And so it's my job to do my best to be that image in Dexter's mind." When asked about playing the only character to join Dexter in his "kill room," Jimmy Smits said: "The crew has a great respect for what they are doing in those scenes. They are energized because those moments are the staple of the show, but at the same time they are very somber. Michael doesn't really like to interface with a lot of people on those days, because it's such a serious subject matter."

Filming one take of the scene in which Miguel kills Fleeter, Smits accidentally picked up a real knife instead of a prop knife and stabbed Jeff Chase in the chest. Though he was not wearing "a metal breastplate like a lot of actors do in a scene like that," Chase had a piece of plastic "the size of a Post-it note" over his heart which was struck by the knife. He was unable to stop Smits when he picked up the knife as he was bound in Saran wrap and had his mouth taped shut with duct tape for the scene. Chase said that in rehearsals Smits had missed the plastic with the prop knife "eight out of ten times."

== Reception ==
Overall, the episode was received well by critics. Alan Sepinwall of The Star-Ledger thought that "The Damage a Man Can Do" had "some major foundational problems", but he said that both Michael C. Hall and Jimmy Smits' performances were "wonderful". Paste magazine's Jeffrey Bloomer likened the episode simply to pulp and felt that Dexter's voice overs lacked their usual "dry, dark humor and gonzo wisdom". IGN critic Matt Fowler believed that Dexter and Miguel's conversations contained "traces of overly awkward dialogue all over" and that the pairings of Debra and Quinn, and LaGuerta and Ellen were "forced" while Miguel's desire to kill seemed "unnatural". Writing for TV Guide, Paula Paige said that her favorite part of the episode was Dexter's spinning Fleeter on the table like a roulette wheel and also she enjoyed Rita's storyline, calling her a "hormonal hoot". TV Squad's Debra McDuffee thought that Angel and Barbara's romance was "painfully awkward" to watch and Rita's storyline was "lame and stereotypical". The A.V. Club's Scott Tobias believed the episode to be "awesome" and said that he was "more anxious than usual to see what Dexter was up to, and equally anxious to get away from the peripheral dramas". BuddyTV critic John Kubicek named "The Damage a Man Can Do" the sixty-fourth best television episode of 2008.
