= Turning Biminese =

- Dexter episode
- Episode no.: Season 3 Episode 5
- Directed by: Marcos Siega
- Written by: Tim Schlattmann
- Cinematography by: Romeo Tirone
- Editing by: Stewart Schill
- Original release date: October 26, 2008
- Running time: 49 minutes

Guest appearances
- Jimmy Smits as Miguel Prado (special guest star); Desmond Harrington as Joey Quinn; David Ramsey as Anton Briggs; Valerie Cruz as Sylvia Prado; Jason Manuel Olazabal as Ramon Prado; Kristin Dattilo as Barbara Gianna; Marc John Jefferies as Wendell Owens; Christina Robinson as Astor Bennett; Preston Bailey as Cody Bennett

Episode chronology
← Previous "All in the Family"	Next → "Sí Se Puede"
- Dexter season 3

"Turning Biminese" is the fifth episode of the third season of the American crime drama television series Dexter. It is the 29th overall episode of the series and was written by producer Tim Schlattmann, and was directed by Marcos Siega. It originally aired on Showtime on October 26, 2008.

Set in Miami, the series centers on Dexter Morgan, a forensic technician specializing in bloodstain pattern analysis for the fictional Miami Metro Police Department, who leads a secret parallel life as a vigilante serial killer, hunting down murderers who have not been adequately punished by the justice system due to corruption or legal technicalities. In the episode, Dexter follows a murderer when Miguel suggests it, while also conflicting with Rita over moving out of his apartment.

According to Nielsen Media Research, the episode was seen by an estimated 1.00 million household viewers and gained a 0.5 ratings share among adults aged 18–49. The episode received critical acclaim, who praised the performances, writing and storylines.

== Plot ==
While golfing, Miguel (Jimmy Smits) tells Dexter (Michael C. Hall) about Ethan Turner (Larry Sullivan), a man who murdered his wife and avoided prison thanks to his lawyers. He killed his second wife, but Miguel's jurisdiction prevents him from prosecuting him.

Anton (David Ramsey) leads Debra (Jennifer Carpenter) to Wendell (Marc John Jefferies), Freebo's doorman. Wendell is reserved and does not want to get himself incriminated, but Debra convinces him to help them. However, Wendell's mother refuses to get him involved in the case out of fear that Freebo could kill them. When The Skinner kills another woman, Miami Metro is forced to work with the Sheriff's Department, which includes Ramón (Jason Manuel Olazabal). Debra notes that Masuka (C. S. Lee) has dropped his usual personality, taking a stoic and blunt persona. Masuka expresses disappointment with how the department views him when she asks him about it.

Dexter gets into a conflict with Rita (Julie Benz) when she wants him to buy a new house and leave his apartment, as Dexter wants to keep it. Dexter stalks Ethan, following him to Bimini. Miguel almost joins him but is forced to go for a court hearing. Dexter incapacitates Ethan and subsequently kills him. However, during this, Rita started bleeding and was taken to the hospital, and Dexter could not be contacted. He makes it to the hospital, where Rita's condition improves. He apologizes and states he is ready to be with her, giving his apartment to Debra.

Ramon is unhappy with Miami Metro's progress in the case and disrespects them. When he offers a different theory, Masuka disproves this with his data. Ramon questions Masuka's credibility, and the department defends him. To Debra's delight, Masuka defends himself, reverting to his old persona. Debra later visits Wendell, learning that Freebo owed money to a person, presumably his killer. Unbeknownst to them, someone watches the meeting from afar. Miguel visits Dexter, revealing that he investigated Dexter's and Turner's whereabouts, concluding that he killed him. Miguel is proud of Dexter, and he offers him his support.

== Production ==
=== Development ===
The episode was written by producer Tim Schlattmann, and was directed by Marcos Siega. This was Schlattmann's fifth writing credit, and Siega's fifth directing credit.

== Reception ==
=== Viewers ===
In its original American broadcast, "Turning Biminese" was seen by an estimated 1.00 million household viewers with a 0.5 in the 18–49 demographics. This means that 0.5 percent of all households with televisions watched the episode. This was a 16% increase in viewership from the previous episode, which was watched by an estimated 0.86 million household viewers with a 0.4/1 in the 18–49 demographics.

=== Critical reviews ===
"Turning Biminese" received critical acclaim. Matt Fowler of IGN gave the episode an "amazing" 9 out of 10, and wrote, "Dexter had his own version of a "bachelor party" and feels ready to marry and buy a new house. Which just leaves Miguel - who really wanted Dexter to head off on his "fishing trip" just so that he could see if he was lying. When Miguel brings up the fact that Ethan Turner has vanished, Dexter turns ghost white. Miguel finally knows what Dexter did... and for the first time, Dexter just might feel like he has a real brother."

Scott Tobias of The A.V. Club gave the episode a "B+" grade and wrote, "Whatever happens, Miguel has put Dexter in a tough spot. His set-up on Ethan Turner proves that he knows how to manipulate Dexter beautifully, and his ability to materialize out of nowhere is pretty unnerving. Plus he's got his attack-dog of a brother, who's now trying to insert himself into Miami Metro's investigation of the skin-clipping murders. I'm still not entirely sold on what Jimmy Smits' Miguel is bringing to the show, but with tonight's big revelation, I'm anxious to see where it goes from here." Jeffrey Bloomer of Paste wrote, "The Prado arc has frustrated fans and has never struck me as particularly viable to the series' overall development, but now Miguel has an inextricable part in Dexter's fate. The new subplot provides a much-needed foil to the developing domestic aspect of the series: for the first time, Dexter has someone who knows what he does, and that presents new possibilities as well as a potential threat."

Alan Sepinwall wrote, "Okay, now we're getting somewhere. After several weeks where I felt like the show was dragging, the pace finally picks up - and not just in the very funny and disturbing sequence where Dexter had to rush his way through the cruise ship kill so he could get off the boat in time. Michael C. Hall did a great job in that sequence of reminding us that part of Dexter's pathology is his commitment to the ritual. Having to rush through it was like bad sex for him - it satisfied the need, but barely even that." Paula Paige of TV Guide wrote, "Miguel's heart-felt speech about being the same as Dexter and being OK with his chosen side gig, was almost like someone professing their love for another."

Debra McDuffee of TV Squad wrote, "Even though our beloved Dexter can be predictable, the way the writers drop the little nuggets for us and how they unfold is still done in such a suspenseful way that we can't help but be on the edge of our seats, even if only to yell out that we saw it coming." Television Without Pity gave the episode a "B" grade.
