= The Lion Sleeps Tonight (Dexter) =

- Dexter episode
- Episode no.: Season 3 Episode 3
- Directed by: John Dahl
- Written by: Scott Buck
- Cinematography by: Romeo Tirone
- Editing by: Matthew V. Colonna
- Original release date: October 12, 2008
- Running time: 49 minutes

Guest appearances
- Jimmy Smits as Miguel Prado (special guest star); Desmond Harrington as Joey Quinn; David Ramsey as Anton Briggs; Valerie Cruz as Sylvia Prado; Anne Ramsay as Ellen Wolf; Jason Manuel Olazabal as Ramon Prado; Jesse Borrego as George King

Episode chronology
← Previous "Finding Freebo"	Next → "All in the Family"
- Dexter season 3

"The Lion Sleeps Tonight" is the third episode of the third season of the American crime drama television series Dexter. It is the 27th overall episode of the series and was written by co-executive producer Scott Buck, and was directed by John Dahl. It originally aired on Showtime on October 12, 2008.

Set in Miami, the series centers on Dexter Morgan, a forensic technician specializing in bloodstain pattern analysis for the fictional Miami Metro Police Department, who leads a secret parallel life as a vigilante serial killer, hunting down murderers who have not been adequately punished by the justice system due to corruption or legal technicalities. In the episode, Dexter and Miguel try to deviate attention from Freebo's whereabouts, while Dexter considers his role as a father.

According to Nielsen Media Research, the episode was seen by an estimated 1.07 million household viewers and gained a 0.5 ratings share among adults aged 18–49. The episode received extremely positive reviews from critics, who praised Hall's performance. For the episode, Michael C. Hall received a nomination for Outstanding Lead Actor in a Drama Series at the 61st Primetime Emmy Awards.

== Plot ==
While shopping with Rita (Julie Benz) and the children, Dexter (Michael C. Hall) sees Astor (Christina Robinson) talking with a stranger. Dexter quietly gets the man to leave and writes down his car's plate number. He discovers that his name is Nathan Marten (Jason Kaufman), a registered sex offender.

Miguel (Jimmy Smits) asks LaGuerta (Lauren Vélez) to stop Oscar's investigation, but she refuses. When another victim is found in the same place where Teegan was murdered, the police suspect Freebo is involved. The victim was Javier Garza, a pimp who led Debra (Jennifer Carpenter) to investigate Freebo's location previously. Miguel invites Dexter and Rita to a festival, where he introduces Dexter to Ramón (Jason Manuel Olazabal), who is unhappy with Miami Metro's progress in Oscar's death. Privately, Dexter and Miguel talk over Freebo's murder; Dexter pretends he has been feeling disturbed, and Miguel comforts him.

Debra questions Anton (David Ramsey), but he does not want to cooperate with her. When Debra insists, Anton lights a marijuana cigarette, getting himself arrested. Quinn (Desmond Harrington) is upset over the arrest, and Angel (David Zayas) gets Debra to release him. Dexter helps Miami Metro identify Teegan as the Jane Doe, exonerating Freebo and stopping his pursuit. Without Freebo as a priority, they set out to identify the killer, which has been nicknamed "The Skinner." Miguel wants to leave Freebo's corpse to be discovered so the investigation can be dropped, but Dexter has already disposed of the remains. He refuses to re-address Chicky Hines' conviction, angering Hines' attorney, Ellen Wolf (Anne Ramsay).

Masuka (C. S. Lee) is upset when he finds that Quinn dumped a magazine with his interview in the trash, feeling the department does not respect him. Dexter notices that Marten has been following them and photographing other children. He warns him to stay away, but Marten claims he has changed. While Dexter wants to kill him, he does not fit the Code. Miguel meets with Dexter to express gratitude for swaying attention from Freebo and gives him the bloodied shirt to show he can trust him. That night, Dexter sneaks into Marten's house, discovering he took photographs of Astor and other children. Enraged, Dexter strangles him, telling him, "No one hurts my children." He steals milk from Marten's refrigerator and returns to Rita's house, reassured he will be a good father.

== Production ==
=== Development ===
The episode was written by co-executive producer Scott Buck, and was directed by John Dahl. This was Buck's fourth writing credit, and Dahl's first directing credit.

== Reception ==
=== Viewers ===
In its original American broadcast, "The Lion Sleeps Tonight" was seen by an estimated 1.07 million household viewers with a 0.5 in the 18–49 demographics. This means that 0.5 percent of all households with televisions watched the episode. This was a 35% increase in viewership from the previous episode, which was watched by an estimated 0.79 million household viewers with a 0.3/1 in the 18–49 demographics.

=== Critical reviews ===
"The Lion Sleeps Tonight" received extremely positive reviews from critics. Matt Fowler of IGN gave the episode a "great" 8.8 out of 10, and wrote, "Although "Lion" doesn't quite have the dramatic punch that came at the end of "Finding Freebo," it is certainly ripe with morbid humor and compelling character choices. The scene when Prado confronts Dexter about always having his "guard" up around him is great, and Prado's gift to Dexter is even greater."

Scott Tobias of The A.V. Club gave the episode a "B" grade and wrote, "They both have serious daddy issues in common, so there's that, and Miguel offers him the incriminating shirt he was wearing after Dexter killed Freebo, so there’s that, too. But you have to believe there’s an ulterior motive or two at play here; otherwise, what kind of suspense show would this be?" Jeffrey Bloomer of Paste wrote, "Very much a transitional episode, this week's Dexter spent more time progressing the season's central plot than it did staking out new ground."

Alan Sepinwall wrote, "Ironically, the only scenes in the episode that felt reassuring were the ones that were the most uncomfortable: basically, any interaction between Dexter and Miguel Prado. Jimmy Smits is doing some really interesting work as a guy who might just be in mourning or might be as crazy in his own way as Dexter. Whenever he's around Dexter, I feel off-balance, which is the way Dexter at its best makes me feel." Paula Paige of TV Guide wrote, "Without any words he tells Rita he will be the baby's father. It was a very sweet moment. From life to death and back again, the circle of life completes itself."

Debra McDuffee of TV Squad wrote, "I found this episode of Dexter to be the funniest so far. I know they aren't exactly going for a dramedy here, but the comedic relief in tonight's episode was priceless. Then again, when Dexter brutally strangles someone, I suppose we needed the change in mood." Television Without Pity gave the episode a "B" grade.

Michael C. Hall submitted this episode for consideration for Outstanding Lead Actor in a Drama Series, while Scott Buck submitted it for Outstanding Writing for a Drama Series at the 61st Primetime Emmy Awards. Hall would get a nomination, but would lose to Bryan Cranston for Breaking Bad.
