= Our Father (Dexter) =

- Dexter episode
- Episode no.: Season 3 Episode 1
- Directed by: Keith Gordon
- Written by: Clyde Phillips
- Production code: 301
- Original air date: September 28, 2008

Guest appearances
- Jimmy Smits as Miguel Prado; Desmond Harrington as Joey Quinn; David Ramsey as Anton Briggs; Christina Robinson as Astor Bennett; Preston Bailey as Cody Bennett; Anthony Tyler Quinn as Dentist; Mike Erwin as Fred "Freebo" Bowman; Jelly Howie as Teegan Campbell; Jason Manuel Olazabal as Ramon Prado; Nick Hermz as Oscar Prado; Liza Lapira as Yuki Amado; Marc John Jefferies as Wendell Owens; Bryce Robinson as Kid #1; Kaleigh Kennedy as Kid #2; Vincent King as Kid #3; Mario Z as Elderly man; Mary Alyce Kania as Technician; Paul Lieber as Bartender; Yolanda Snowball as Teacher; Joel Weiss as Cal Rooney

Episode chronology
| ← Previous "The British Invasion" | Next → "Finding Freebo" |
- Dexter (season 3)

"Our Father" is the third season premiere and twenty-fifth overall episode of the American television drama series Dexter, which first aired on September 28, 2008, on Showtime in the United States. The episode was written by Clyde Phillips and directed by Keith Gordon. In the episode, which takes place several months after the second-season finale, Dexter Morgan (Michael C. Hall) mistakenly kills an innocent man but forms a friendship with the man's brother, well-known assistant district attorney Miguel Prado (Jimmy Smits). Dexter's sister Debra (Jennifer Carpenter), meanwhile, has turned over a new leaf in her life and is determined to become a detective.

To carry the remainder of the third season, Dexter's writers introduced Miguel as a new character so that his relationship with Dexter could serve as a "central arc". In order to allow them to explore Dexter's psychological and emotional reactions, the writers revealed Dexter's girlfriend Rita Bennett (Julie Benz) to be pregnant. They also had Dexter kill an innocent person to develop the ongoing theme of rebellion despite initially rejecting the idea of Dexter killing "somebody who doesn't deserve it". Filming of the episode began in early June in Los Angeles, California at Sunset Gower Studios, though a small crew flew to Miami, Florida, where the show is set, to film short pieces of Dexter, which were integrated into "Our Father" and other episodes. The episode brought in 1.22 million viewers, an improvement from second season's premiere and finale, and attracted mixed reviews from critics.

== Plot ==
Several months after the deaths of James Doakes and Lila Tournay, Dexter Morgan's life has returned to normal. He looks up a drug dealer, Fred "Freebo" Bowman (Mike Erwin), whom he believes to have killed two female college students. Pretending to want to buy heroin, Dexter visits Freebo's house, where he sees his girlfriend Teegan Campbell (Jelly Howie). At night, he returns to the house and finds Freebo fighting with another man (Nick Hermz). When the man attacks Dexter, he stabs and kills him in self-defense. Dexter flees, shocked about breaking his father Harry's "code" and killing an innocent person.

Dexter is called to the scene the following day and discovers that the man was Oscar Prado, the brother of prominent Assistant District Attorney Miguel Prado. Miguel seeks an explanation and consolation from Dexter and invites him to Oscar's wake. Dexter attends, leaving his sister Debra alone on their dead father's birthday. He begins to question Harry's code and whether his loyalty is necessary. At the Miami-Metro PD, Det. Angel Batista is promoted to sergeant. Det. Joey Quinn (Desmond Harrington), recently transferred to the department, is being investigated by Internal Affairs. Sgt. Yuki Amado (Liza Lapira) asks Debra repeatedly to keep an eye on Quinn, but Debra declines even when she discovers that "snitching" may earn her a detective's shield.

Debra discovers from one of Quinn's informants, Anton Briggs (David Ramsey), that Oscar was a drug addict and in Freebo's debt. However, after Debra loudly divulges the information in Miguel's presence, Lt. María LaGuerta asks Batista to remove her from the case. Batista puts her on the case of a "Jane Doe," who Dexter recognizes as Teegan. Meanwhile, Dexter's girlfriend Rita craves chocolate pudding and, recalling the last instance, realizes she is pregnant.

== Production ==
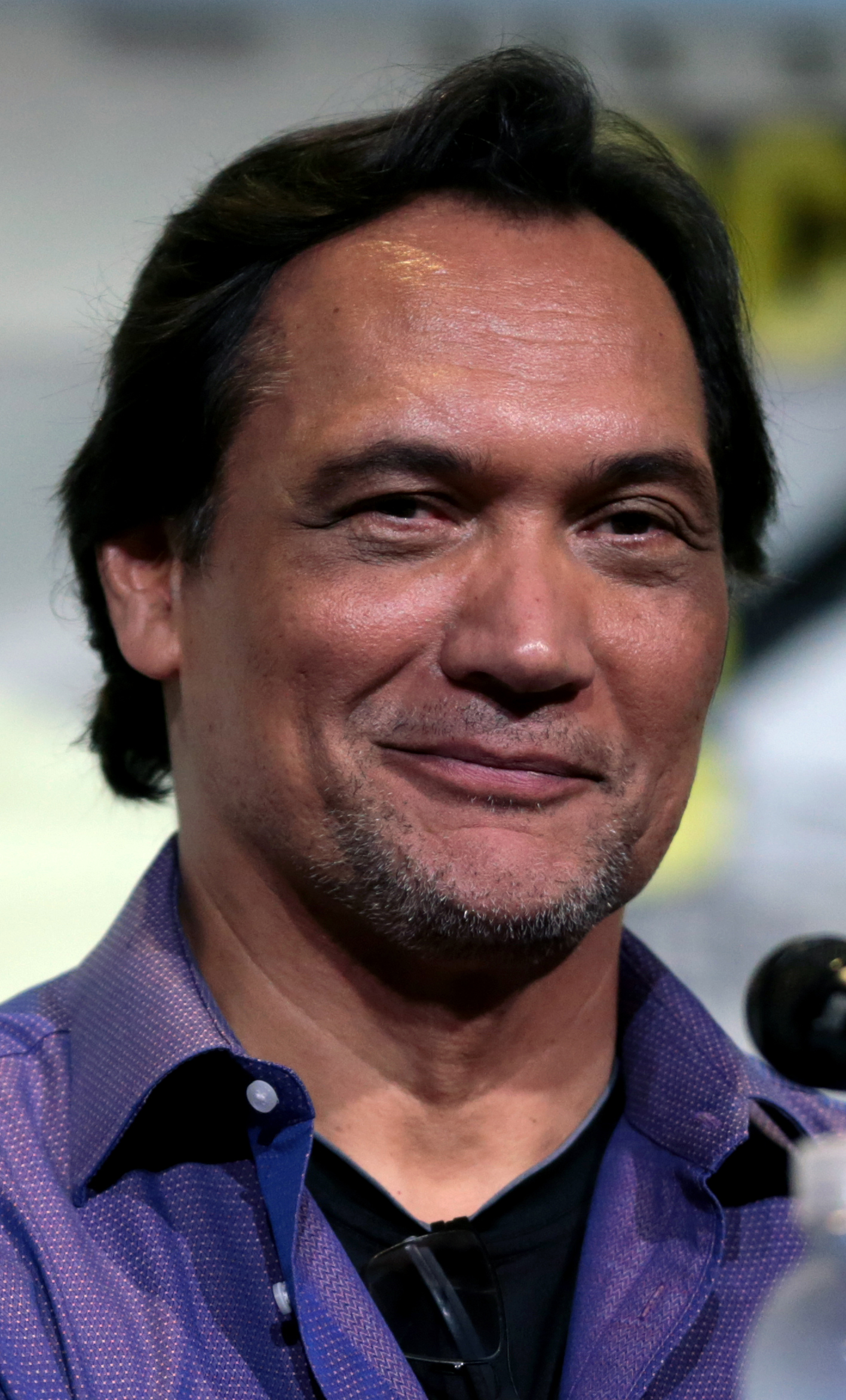
Jimmy Smits joined the cast because Miguel was dissimilar to his previous roles

Dexter's writing staff began meeting in March 2008 to brainstorm ideas for the third season's storylines. Writer Clyde Phillips said that, when the writers decided to open season 3 with the revelation of Rita's pregnancy, "we were thinking about how it would affect Dexter psychologically and emotionally to create a life when he has spent most of his adult life taking lives." They chose to introduce Miguel as a new character with the intention for his and Dexter's relationship to be "the central arc of the season", according to Hall. Smits was the only actor who was considered for the role of Miguel. Smits was not initially interested in joining the cast, but after Phillips explained Miguel's dark side to him, Smits accepted the job offer because it was an opportunity to play a character dissimilar to any he had played before. He said, "They promised upfront that this was really going to challenge me, that it would be stuff that I haven't done before, and they've really given me a shot. They've delivered the goods." In regard to Dexter's abandonment of Harry's Code, Hall said that "That need to rebel is a real engine for what unfolds this season." Smits was hired to appear in ten of the season's twelve episodes. When asked at the beginning of the second season whether there was any possibility of Dexter killing an innocent person, show runner Daniel Cerone said that by not doing so, they were "protecting the character". He thought that it was "very important for the show that he does kill people who deserve it". Phillips said that "We don't want him knowingly killing somebody who doesn't deserve it out of impulse or something, but we have explored the notion of his having killed someone without properly vetting that person and perhaps making a mistake."

Production was scheduled to commence in late May, but was delayed until early June. A small crew flew to Miami with Hall and, according to producer Sara Colleton, filmed "a lot of pieces—not just Dexter walking in and out of his door or car, but also scenes that we know we'll need and can use", before returning to the show's permanent sets at Sunset Gower Studios in Los Angeles.

== Reception ==
"Our Father" brought in 1.22 million viewers, a 20 percent improvement on both the second season's premiere and finale, and Showtime's highest-rated drama season premiere since 2004 when Nielsen Media Research began compiling their ratings for premium networks. In the United Kingdom, the episode was the ninth most-watched program in its timeslot with 194,000 viewers and an audience share of 1.2 percent, a significant decline from "It's Alive!", the second-season premiere.

"Our Father" received mixed reviews from critics; some thought that it was dull, though Smits' performance received widespread critical acclaim. Alan Sepinwall of The Star-Ledger said that he was "frustrated" by the episode despite not finding any faults with it, writing, "I can't help thinking that I've seen as much of Dexter Morgan's world as I need to." Matt Fowler, writing for IGN, thought that the revelation of Rita's pregnancy was "an interesting development, but not necessarily something that instantly catapults me to the edge of my seat" but that Smits as Miguel could improve "even [a] great [show] like Dexter". The Australian's Stephen Romei felt that, with the beginning of the third season, "Dexter has gone from an eight to a six" on a scale of one to ten, saying that the show "has lost its edge" with the hypocrisy of Dexter being a supposed sociopath despite holding several relationships. Los Angeles Times critic Claire Zulkey was "not sure yet whether [the third season's changes are] good". Ray Ellis of Blogcritics felt that "the series has settled into a state of complacency" and could not "escape the feeling I've seen this before". On the other hand, the San Francisco Chronicle's Tim Goodman wrote that "the whiff of normalcy for Dexter" gives viewers "a magnificent tease" and likened the fast-moving plot to "the urgency of brilliance". TV Squad critic Debra McDuffee was "pleasantly surprised by Smits" and said that, thus far, "season three is a good one". TV Guide's Paula Paige, who was "thrilled" to see Smits join the cast, said, "What the Dexter season three opener lacked in explosive excitement, it certainly made up for in Jimmy Smits." Daniel Fienberg, writing for Zap2it, said that the combination of Hall and Smits was "as good as TV acting gets" and that, in comparison to the second season's opening, "the show's creative team appears to have done it again".
