= Finding Freebo =

- Dexter episode
- Episode no.: Season 3 Episode 2
- Directed by: Marcos Siega
- Written by: Melissa Rosenberg
- Cinematography by: Romeo Tirone
- Editing by: Stewart Schill
- Original release date: October 5, 2008
- Running time: 49 minutes

Guest appearances
- Jimmy Smits as Miguel Prado (special guest star); Desmond Harrington as Joey Quinn; David Ramsey as Anton Briggs; Liza Lapira as Yuki Amado; Mike Erwin as Fred "Freebo" Bowman; Valerie Cruz as Sylvia Prado; Natalie Garza as Amanda; Nicole Garza as Kelly; Todd Giebenhain as Zack Adelman; Jason Manuel Olazabal as Ramon Prado; Ray Santiago as Javier Garza

Episode chronology
← Previous "Our Father"	Next → "The Lion Sleeps Tonight"
- Dexter season 3

"Finding Freebo" is the second episode of the third season of the American crime drama television series Dexter. It is the 26th overall episode of the series and was written by co-executive producer Melissa Rosenberg, and was directed by Marcos Siega. It originally aired on Showtime on October 5, 2008.

Set in Miami, the series centers on Dexter Morgan, a forensic technician specializing in bloodstain pattern analysis for the fictional Miami Metro Police Department, who leads a secret parallel life as a vigilante serial killer, hunting down murderers who have not been adequately punished by the justice system due to corruption or legal technicalities. In the episode, Dexter sets out in finding Freebo before he can reveal his identity, while Miguel sets out in his own investigation.

According to Nielsen Media Research, the episode was seen by an estimated 0.79 million household viewers and gained a 0.3/1 ratings share among adults aged 18–49. The episode received extremely positive reviews from critics, who considered it as an improvement over the season premiere.

== Plot ==
Dexter (Michael C. Hall) is curious about his prospects as a possible father after Rita (Julie Benz) reveals her pregnancy. Rita is still unsure about the idea of another baby, so she wants Dexter's opinion on the matter. Eventually, she decides to keep the baby, but does not want to pressure Dexter into being part of the child's life.

As the police investigates the identity of the Jane Doe, Miguel (Jimmy Smits) asks to be involved in the case, but LaGuerta (Lauren Vélez) turns him down. He decides to invite Dexter and Rita to dine with him and his wife Sylvia (Valerie Cruz), using the opportunity to question him about the investigation. Miguel reveals that his brother Ramon (Jason Manuel Olazabal) is currently investigating as a police officer, as he found Freebo's mother's phone, worrying Dexter that they might find a connection.

Debra (Jennifer Carpenter) continues being pressured by Yuki (Liza Lapira) to find anything important with Quinn (Desmond Harrington). Instead, Debra continues seeing Anton (David Ramsey) to find information on Jane Doe. Later, Debra and Angel (David Zayas) find Freebo's partner, Zack Adelman (Todd Giebenhain), who claims that one of Miguel's recently convicted criminals is innocent. Through the cases, they identify Teegan as Jane Doe. Realizing Freebo killed her and might still be in town, Dexter sets out to kill him.

Dexter breaks into Teegan's house and discovers that Freebo is hiding. He takes him to the garage, where he kills him. However, Miguel has arrived outside the house, planning to kill Freebo himself. Dexter is forced to abandon the body and walk outside, explaining that he killed Freebo in self-defense. Miguel sympathizes with Dexter, feeling he could not do it himself. They exchange a hug, and Dexter asks him to leave so he is not traced. Unbeknownst to them, part of Miguel's shirt was covered with Freebo's blood.

== Production ==
=== Development ===
The episode was written by co-executive producer Melissa Rosenberg, and was directed by Marcos Siega. This was Rosenberg's seventh writing credit, and Siega's fourth directing credit.

== Reception ==
=== Viewers ===
In its original American broadcast, "Finding Freebo" was seen by an estimated 0.79 million household viewers with a 0.3/1 in the 18–49 demographics. This means that 0.3 percent of all households with televisions watched the episode, while 1 percent of all of those watching television at the time of the broadcast watched it. This was a 36% decrease in viewership from the previous episode, which was watched by an estimated 1.22 million household viewers with a 0.5 in the 18–49 demographics.

=== Critical reviews ===
"Finding Freebo" received extremely positive reviews from critics. Eric Goldman of IGN gave the episode a "great" 8.7 out of 10, and wrote, "By the end of "Finding Freebo," the heart of Dexter Season 3 officially gets kick started. Like a shock with some defibrillators. We get a nice sense of the long and torturous road ahead, and not to mention some prime nail-biting moments of suspense. It no longer feels like they're merely laying the groundwork."

Scott Tobias of The A.V. Club gave the episode a "B+" grade and wrote, "So far, the pregnancy wrinkle is what's setting Dexter's third season apart from the other two; in other ways, the dynamic is closer to Season Two, with Dexter having a personal stake in a Miami Metro manhunt and doing everything he can to stay ahead of his colleagues. I'm not ready to declare that the show is running out of gas creatively, not when it continues to provide solid, tight, well-plotted hours like this week and last. But I'm a little worried that the closer Dexter gets to being human, he and the show are in danger of losing their edge."

Alan Sepinwall wrote, "Dexter has really been the only fully-formed character on the show, with Deb the only other one who comes close. When someone else's story in some way ties directly to Dexter - Prado coming across Dexter moments after Freebo's death, for instance - then I care about them. But as soon as they leave his orbit even slightly, my interest level plummets." Paula Paige of TV Guide wrote, "He wants to help Dexter clean up the body, but Dexter is already several steps ahead, telling him it's best for him not to be there. Only, he sends Prado away with blood on his shirt. Each of them got a little bit closer to their Freebo goal. Let's hope it's enough."

Debra McDuffee of TV Squad wrote, "I don't know about you, but I get severely tense when people find out about Dexter. I miss the old days when he was an untouchable, uncatchable killer. But then again, this way is a lot more fun." Television Without Pity gave the episode an "A–" grade.
