= About Last Night (Dexter) =

- Dexter episode
- Episode no.: Season 3 Episode 9
- Directed by: Tim Hunter
- Story by: Scott Reynolds
- Teleplay by: Melissa Rosenberg
- Cinematography by: Romeo Tirone
- Editing by: Matthew V. Colonna
- Original release date: November 23, 2008
- Running time: 51 minutes

Guest appearances
- Jimmy Smits as Miguel Prado (special guest star); Desmond Harrington as Joey Quinn; David Ramsey as Anton Briggs; Valerie Cruz as Sylvia Prado; Anne Ramsay as Ellen Wolf; Kristin Dattilo as Barbara Gianna; Jesse Borrego as George King

Episode chronology
← Previous "The Damage a Man Can Do"	Next → "Go Your Own Way"
- Dexter season 3

"About Last Night" is the ninth episode of the third season of the American crime drama television series Dexter. It is the 33rd overall episode of the series and was written by Melissa Rosenberg from a story by Scott Reynolds, and was directed by co-executive producer Tim Hunter. It originally aired on Showtime on November 23, 2008.

Set in Miami, the series centers on Dexter Morgan, a forensic technician specializing in bloodstain pattern analysis for the fictional Miami Metro Police Department, who leads a secret parallel life as a vigilante serial killer, hunting down murderers who have not been adequately punished by the justice system due to corruption or legal technicalities. In the episode, Dexter suspects Miguel might be hiding something, while Debra and Quinn find a new lead in The Skinner's case.

According to Nielsen Media Research, the episode was seen by an estimated 1.13 million household viewers and gained a 0.6 ratings share among adults aged 18–49. The episode received critical acclaim, with critics praising the revelations and character development.

== Plot ==
Sylvia (Valerie Cruz) visits Dexter (Michael C. Hall), fearing that Miguel (Jimmy Smits) was absent for the night and believes it might be an affair. Dexter provides an alibi for Miguel, but is surprised when she tells him he barely arrived at her house. Miguel claims he went to a bar to celebrate, but Dexter knows he is lying as the bar was closed for a few hours.

Miami Metro investigates Anton's disappearance, concluding The Skinner is responsible. At an unknown location, The Skinner is revealed to be George King (Jesse Borrego), who tortures Anton (David Ramsey) in revealing Freebo's location. King is brought in for questioning by Debra (Jennifer Carpenter) and Quinn (Desmond Harrington), and maintains himself calmed. Noticing that Mario is frightened of King, Dexter suggests Debra can use disrespect towards King, as that is something he dislikes. Debra instead attacks King, but is stopped by Quinn; they must be strategic, as they only have a few hours to keep him in custody.

When Ellen Wolf (Anne Ramsay) goes missing, Dexter investigates her house and discovers blood, realizing Miguel might have been involved. He visits a cemetery, discovering a location where Miguel buried her body. When he confronts him, Miguel admits it, but states they simply have different ideas of what they want. Dexter then sets up two boys to discover Ellen's body at the cemetery, and Miami Metro is sent to investigate. Miguel is disappointed with the discovery, but Dexter hopes he learned something. While talking with Rita (Julie Benz), Dexter realizes Miguel used the same speech with him.

Miguel talks privately with King to get a confession, requiring the camera to be turned off. However, King does not confess and they are forced to release him. To get Mario to talk, Debra and Quinn stage tree trimmers, getting him to finally reveal King's hideout. They save Anton, but King escapes. Suspecting Miguel of lying, Dexter decides to run a test on the shirt that Miguel gave him back. Dexter is astonished when it is revealed that the blood is not Freebo's, it was actually cow blood. Dexter is upset upon learning that Miguel has been using him since the beginning, and intends to strike back.

== Production ==
=== Development ===
The episode was written by co-executive producer Melissa Rosenberg from a story by Scott Reynolds, and was directed by Tim Hunter. This was Rosenberg's eighth writing credit, Reynolds' second writing credit, and Hunter's first directing credit.

== Reception ==
=== Viewers ===
In its original American broadcast, "About Last Night" was seen by an estimated 1.13 million household viewers with a 0.6 in the 18–49 demographics. This means that 0.6 percent of all households with televisions watched the episode. This was a 17% increase in viewership from the previous episode, which was watched by an estimated 0.96 million household viewers with a 0.5 in the 18–49 demographics.

=== Critical reviews ===
"About Last Night" received critical acclaim. Matt Fowler of IGN gave the episode an "amazing" 9.4 out of 10, and wrote, "This episode was great and honest. It lacked the cartoon goofiness of the previous episode and just thrilled me with procedural suspense. And even though we wouldn't want Dexter to rest on its laurels and repeat themes, there's something fun about tracking down a new serial killer."

Scott Tobias of The A.V. Club gave the episode a "B" grade and wrote, "The cat-and-mouse game between Dexter and Miguel has now ramped up for what should be a killer finale, and a still-on-the-loose Skinner seems like to insert himself into the main thread some time soon. I expect an uptick in quality when all these storylines start to converge, since nothing will be entirely independent of Dexter's experience and thus will not be lame." Jeffrey Bloomer of Paste wrote, "The final episodes will no doubt evolve into the dense plot webs they always do late-season, and now that the show has fallen back into its natural rhythm, it should be a good time."

Alan Sepinwall wrote, "If, as I had speculated before, Miguel had been using his brother Oscar as an avenging angel, and that he turned to Dexter as both a replacement and an attempt to get hands-on training in the art of homicidal vigilantism, then his lack of curiosity about Dexter past, and about the high probability that he's the Bay Harbor Butcher, makes much more sense. Very, very interesting, and Michael C. Hall and Jimmy Smits continue to rock it." Paula Paige of TV Guide was unsatisfied with the Skinner's identity, "George King is just some random character we've hardly seen even though he is central to the plot. I would have preferred it to be Quinn, although he really showed up for Debra and I have a new found respect for him."

Debra McDuffee of TV Squad wrote, "Things are coming together and they will have a lot to cram into the last three episodes of Dexter, that's for sure. Some huge things happened in this episode, but mostly, it leaves me with a lot of questions. Really, really good questions." Television Without Pity gave the episode a "B+" grade.

Tim Hunter submitted this episode for consideration for Outstanding Directing for a Drama Series at the 61st Primetime Emmy Awards.
