= The Fabulous Filipino Brothers =

- Directed by: Dante Basco
- Written by: Dante Basco; Darion Basco; Dionysio Basco; Arianna Basco
- Starring: Derek Basco; Dante Basco; Dionysio Basco; Darion Basco
- Narrated by: Arianna Basco
- Cinematography: Andrea Walter
- Edited by: Brian Merrick
- Music by: AJ Rafael
- Production companies: Cignal Entertainment; TheMachine
- Distributed by: Cignal TV
- Release date: March 16, 2021 (SXSW)
- Running time: 99 minutes
- Countries: Philippines; United States
- Languages: English; Filipino

The Fabulous Filipino Brothers is a 2021 comedy-drama film directed by Dante Basco produced under Cignal Entertainment and TheMachine. The film features the story of four brothers coming from a Filipino American family based in Pittsburg, California.

== Cast ==
=== Main ===
- Derek Basco as Darius "Dayo" Abasta
- Dante Basco as Douglas "Duke" Abasta
- Dionysio Basco as David Abasta
- Darion Basco as Dante "Danny Boy" Abasta

=== Supporting ===
- Joey Guila as Berto
- Joseph Jitsukawa as Nicky Chang
- Iluminada Monroy as Grandma Abasta
- Solenn Heussaff as Anna
- Tirso Cruz III
- Crystal Kwon
- Liza Lapira as Teresa
- Arianna Basco

== Production ==
The Fabulous Filipino Brothers was produced under the Philippine production outfit Cignal Entertainment and Los Angeles-based production and management firm TheMachine. The film serves as the directorial debut of Filipino American Hollywood actor Dante Basco known for his role as Rufio in the 1991 film Hook and his voiced role as Zuko in the animated television series Avatar: The Last Airbender. The story of the film, revolving around a Filipino American family, was written by Dante himself along with his brother Darion and sister Arianna.

The Basco siblings' own experience with their family and the wider Filipino American community in their hometown influenced the conception of the film. Director Basco made his own brothers along with himself as the starring actors for the film naming the characters after their father and uncles. The director's sister Arianna and parents were also part of the cast. The film was set in Pittsburg, California the hometown of the Bascos. Principal photography took 16 days in both the United States and Manila in the Philippines, prior to the COVID-19 pandemic.

== Release ==
The Fabulous Filipino Brothers premiered in the United States on March 16, 2021 at the South by Southwest (SXSW) Film Festival in Texas.

The film was later made available in a pay per view basis from October 18 to November 15, 2021 on Cignal and KTX.ph. It was also released worldwide except in Europe and North America on Netflix on November 16, 2021.
