= Jeff Chase =

American film and television actor (born 1968)

- Born: Jeffrey L. Sniffen; January 17, 1968 (age 58); Paterson, New Jersey, U.S.
- Other names: Jeffrey Chase; Jeffrey Sniffen; Jeffrey S. Chase
- Occupations: Actor, Football Player, Stuntman

Jeff Chase (born Jeffrey L. Sniffen; January 17, 1968) is an American film and television actor who played for the Albany Firebirds of the Arena Football League.

Chase was born in Paterson, New Jersey. Raised in Totowa, New Jersey and West Paterson (now Woodland Park), he attended Passaic Valley Regional High School. He attended West Virginia University and, as Jeff Sniffen, played offensive tackle on the football team from 1986 to 1991. He played one season of professional football for the Albany Firebirds of the Arena Football League.

While filming the Dexter episode "The Damage a Man Can Do", in which Chase was a stuntman, actor Jimmy Smits accidentally stabbed Chase with a real knife instead of a fake one.

== Filmography ==
- 2001 In the Shadows as FBI Agent Sergei
- 2001 Sheena (TV series) as Thug #1 (1 episode)
- 2001 Black Knight as The Giant (uncredited)
- 2001-2005 Alias (TV series) as Large Russian (5 episodes)
- 2002 All About the Benjamins as Mango
- 2002 NYPD Blue (TV series) as Ray Morrison (1 episode)
- 2002 Cedric the Entertainer Presents (TV series) as Galley Slave (2 episodes)
- 2003 Dunsmore as Boone
- 2003 Nip/Tuck (TV series) as Jose (1 episode)
- 2003 Dickie Roberts: Former Child Star as Man In Car (uncredited)
- 2003 The Rundown as Jamal Johnson
- 2004 Lenny the Wonder Dog as Panky
- 2004 She Spies (TV series) as Giant Morgue Worker (1 episode)
- 2004 The Punisher as Saint's Enforcer (uncredited)
- 2005 Transporter 2 as Vasily
- 2005 Monk (TV series) as Fire Starter (1 episode)
- 2005 Kids in America as Assistant Coach Fasso
- 2006 Huff (TV series) as Bouncer (1 episode)
- 2006 Pepper Dennis (TV series) as Poker Guy (1 episode)
- 2006 Mission: Impossible III as Davian's Bodyguard
- 2006 The Marine as Billy
- 2006 What About Brian (TV series) as Bouncer (1 episode)
- 2007 Nurses (TV) as 370 lb Man
- 2007 Undead or Alive as Zombie
- 2007 Redline as Gumba #5
- 2007 Burn Notice (TV series) as Wayne Ray (1 episode)
- 2007 Sydney White as Ron "Big Ron"
- 2007 Loaded as Thug
- 2007 Ace Ventura: Pet Detective, Jr. as Pennington Bodyguard
- 2008 The Year of Getting to Know Us as Arnold
- 2008 Days of our Lives as Eddie Vitali (5 episodes)
- 2008 Dexter (TV series) as Billy Fleeter (1 episode)
- 2009 Star Trek as "Dexter", Alien Cadet
- 2009 Ace Ventura Jr.: Pet Detective as Pennington Bodyguard
- 2010 The Spy Next Door as Russian
- 2011 The Mechanic as Burke
- 2011 Swamp Shark as Jason "Swamp Thing" Broussard
- 2011 Kill the Irishman as Joe Buka
- 2012 Rock of Ages as Stacee's Bodyguard
- 2012 Looper as Tall Gat Man
- 2013 Banshee as Jeffrey Thompson (2 episodes)
- 2013 Pain & Gain as Prison Brawler (uncredited)
- 2013 Star Trek Into Darkness as Security Officer
- 2013 Escape Plan as Prisoner Beaten By Breslin
- 2013 Missionary as Brian
- 2013 Under the Dome as "Boomer" Platt
- 2014 Let's Be Cops as Leka
- 2015 Dark Places as Calvin Diehl
- 2016 True Memoirs of an International Assassin as La Roche
- 2017 Baby Driver as Jeffrey (uncredited)
- 2019 Jay and Silent Bob Reboot as Pitchfork Guy
- 2019 Escape Plan: The Extractors as Frankie
- 2020 Arkansas as Thomas
- 2024 Armor as "Viper"
- 2025 Bride Hard as Magnus
