= Adam Fierro =

American television writer and producer

Adam Fierro is an American television writer and producer.

== Biography ==
Fierro began his television career as a freelance writer. He wrote two scripts for the first season of Resurrection Blvd. in 2000. In 2002 he returned as a co-producer and writer for the third season and contributed a further three episodes.

In 2004 Fierro joined the crew of The Shield as a writer and co-producer. He wrote three episodes for the third season. He was promoted to producer in 2005 and contributed a further two episodes to the fourth season. He continued to receive more responsibility and became a supervising producer for the fifth season writing two more episodes. He was made co-executive producer for the sixth season and wrote two more episodes. After filming completed on the sixth season of The Shield Fierro became a co-executive producer for the sixth season of 24 and wrote an episode. Fierro returned to The Shield for the seventh and final season and served as an executive producer and wrote three episodes.

After completing work on The Shield Fierro became a consulting producer and writer for the third season of Dexter. He was nominated for a Writers Guild of America Award at the February 2009 ceremony for Best Dramatic Series for his work on the third season of Dexter. Fierro was reunited with The Shield producer Charles H. Eglee on Dexter.

Fierro served as a consulting producer and writer for the second season of medical drama series Hawthorne in 2010. The series show runner was Fierro's The Shield colleague Glen Mazzara.

Fierro again worked with Eglee on the first season of AMC drama series The Walking Dead. Fierro wrote the season finale "TS-19". Eglee was an executive producer on The Walking Dead. The episode also reunited Fierro with frequent The Shield director Guy Ferland; Ferland helmed "TS-19".

In 2014, Fierro was the executive producer of the USA medical drama Rush. The series ran for one season.

Fierro married writer Elizabeth Craft in 2007. The two met while working on "The Shield". Fierro's sister, Olivia Fierro is a television news anchor.

== Filmography ==
=== Producer ===
Year	Show	Role	Notes
2010	The Walking Dead	Consulting producer	Season one
2010	Hawthorne	Consulting producer	Season two
2008	Dexter	Consulting producer	Season three
2008	The Shield	Executive producer	Season seven
2007	The Shield	Co-executive producer	Season six
2007	24	Co-executive producer	Season six
2006	The Shield	Supervising producer	Season five
2005	The Shield	Producer	Season four
2004	The Shield	Co-producer	Season three
2002	Resurrection Blvd.	Co-producer	Season three

=== Writer ===
Year	Show	Episode	Notes
2010	The Walking Dead	"TS-19"	Season 1, episode 6
2008	Dexter	"All in the Family"	Season 3, episode 4
2008	The Shield	"Possible Kill Screen"	Season 7, episode 12
2008	The Shield	"Moving Day"	Season 7, episode 9
2008	The Shield	"Moneyshot"	Season 7, episode 3
2007	24	"Day 6: 2:00 p.m. - 3:00 p.m."	Season 6, episode 9
2007	The Shield	"Chasing Ghosts"	Season 6, episode 6
2007	The Shield	"Back to One"	Season 6, episode 3
2006	The Shield	"Postpartum"	Season 5, episode 11
2006	The Shield	"Man Inside"	Season 5, episode 7
2006	The Shield	"Enemy of Good"	Season 5, episode 2
2005	The Shield	"A Thousand Deaths"	Season 4, episode 11
2005	The Shield	"Doghouse"	Season 4, episode 2
2004	The Shield	"Riceburner"	Season 3, episode 12
2004	The Shield	"Safe"	Season 3, episode 7
2004	The Shield	"Bottom Bitch"	Season 3, episode 3
2002	Resurrection Blvd.	"El Gato, El Vato, La Cena Y El Padre"	Season 3, episode 9
2002	Resurrection Blvd.	"Las Tristesas de Zake"	Season 3, episode 6
2002	Resurrection Blvd.	"La Guera de Bibi"	Season 3, episode 3
2000	Resurrection Blvd.	"Revelaciones"	Season 1, episode 14
2000	Resurrection Blvd.	"Luchando"	Season 1, episode 8

== Awards and nominations ==
- Nominated for an ALMA Award for Outstanding Writing - Television Series, Mini-Series or Television Movie for his work on The Shield episode "Enemy of Good" along with his co-writer Charles H. Eglee.
- Nominated for a Writers Guild of America Award at the February 2009 ceremony for Best Dramatic Series for his work on the third season of Dexter.
