= Liza Lapira =

American actress (born 1981)

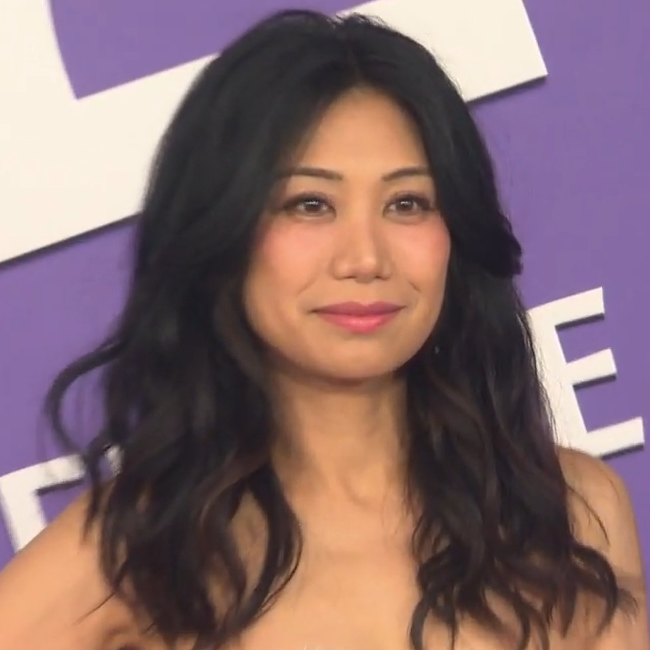
- Lapira in 2024
- Born: December 3, 1981 (age 44); Queens, New York City, U.S.
- Occupation: Actress
- Years active: 1999–present

Liza Lapira (born December 3, 1981) is an American actress. She played Kianna in the 2008 film 21, Special Agent Michelle Lee in the CBS police procedural series NCIS, and Ivy, Topher Brink's assistant, in Dollhouse. Lapira has also co-starred in the short-lived sitcoms Traffic Light, Don't Trust the B— in Apartment 23, Super Fun Night, and 9JKL. She is known for her roles as Shaquan on UPN's The Parkers and Melody "Mel" Bayani on CBS's The Equalizer. She voiced Disgust in the Pixar animated film Inside Out 2, replacing Mindy Kaling from the first film. In 2024, she was named Global Pinoy Of The Week on GMA Pinoy TV.

== Early life ==
Lapira was born on December 3, 1981, in Queens, New York City. She is of Filipino descent.

== Career ==
=== Stage ===
Lapira's New York stage credits include As You Like It, The School for Wives, The Odyssey, and Alexandra Cunningham's No. 11 Blue and White. Most recently, she played Suzanne in Steve Martin's Picasso at the Lapin Agile at the Old Globe Theatre in San Diego.

=== Film ===
Early film credits include director Tony Scott's Domino and independent feature The Big Bad Swim, which premiered at the Tribeca Film Festival in 2006. Lapira appeared in J. J. Abrams' 2008 film Cloverfield as Heather and also appeared in Table for Three and 21. In 2009, she played Agent Sophie Trinh in the film Fast & Furious opposite Paul Walker, and in 2010, she played Alva in Repo Men. She portrayed Liz, the sharp-tongued friend of Hannah (Emma Stone) in the 2011 film Crazy, Stupid, Love. In 2021, she played Teresa in Dante Basco's directorial debut The Fabulous Filipino Brothers. She voiced Disgust in Pixar's Inside Out 2, replacing Mindy Kaling, who voiced the character in the first film.

=== Television ===
Lapira's first major role was a series regular spot on the Showtime TV series Huff. Lapira played neuroscientist Ivy in both seasons of Joss Whedon's series Dollhouse, appearing predominantly with Fran Kranz and Dichen Lachman.

Her TV credits include recurring roles in Dexter, ER, Monk, Grey's Anatomy, Law & Order: Special Victims Unit, The Parkers as Shaquan, Sex and the City, and The Sopranos.

Lapira had regular roles as: Agent Michelle Lee in NCIS, Lisa in Traffic Light, Robin in Don't Trust the B— in Apartment 23, Detective Jacocks in Battle Creek, Leslie Barrett in Cooper Barrett's Guide to Surviving Life, and Eve in the CBS comedy 9JKL.

In August 2018, Lapira joined the recurring cast of the Netflix limited-series Unbelievable.

In 2020, Lapira was cast as a lead on CBS' The Equalizer reboot opposite Queen Latifah and Chris Noth.

== Personal life ==
In New York, she acted on stage and in independent films. She moved to Los Angeles in 2004 to work in television. Lapira is an avid supporter of LA's Best, which provides after school services to 28,000 children in 189 schools in the neighborhoods with the highest needs around Los Angeles. Also, she participates in the Children's Hospital Los Angeles Charity Triathlon each fall in Malibu. Currently, she is working with The Impact Theatre in Harlem, while living on the east coast.

== Filmography ==
=== Film ===
| Year | Title | Role | Notes |
|---|---|---|---|
| 2000 | Autumn in New York | Charlotte's Friend | |
| 2002 | Brown Sugar | Receptionist | |
| 2005 | Domino | Chinegro Woman | |
| 2006 | The Big Bad Swim | Paula | |
| 2007 | LA Blues | Sandra | |
| 2008 | Cloverfield | Heather | |
| 2008 | 21 | Kianna | |
| 2009 | Fast & Furious | Sophie Trinh | |
| 2009 | Table for Three | Nerissa | Direct-to-video film |
| 2010 | Repo Men | Alva | |
| 2010 | See You in September | Monica | |
| 2010 | Marmaduke | Party Dog #1 (voice) | |
| 2011 | Crazy, Stupid, Love | Liz | |
| 2012 | The Happiest Person in America | Lara | Short film; also associate producer |
| 2014 | Someone Marry Barry | Single Mom at Wedding | |
| 2017 | All I Wish | Darla | |
| 2018 | The Samuel Project | Nadia Akiyama | |
| 2021 | The Fabulous Filipino Brothers | Teresa | |
| 2024 | Inside Out 2 | Disgust (voice) | Replaced Mindy Kaling |

=== Television ===
| Year | Title | Role | Notes |
|---|---|---|---|
| 1999–2007 | Law & Order: Special Victims Unit | (1) Waitress (2) Rebecca Chang (3) (4) (5) (6) Forensics Technician Lu | (1) Season 1 Episode 5: "Wanderlust" (1999) (2) Season 2 Episode 21: "Scourge" (2001) (3) Season 8 Episode 11: "Burned" (2007) (4) Season 8 Episode 14: "Dependent" (2007) (5) Season 9 Episode 2: "Avatar" (2007) (6) Season 9 Episode 10: "Snitch" (2007) |
| 2001 | Law & Order | Cheryl Treadwell | Season 11 Episode 14: "A Losing Season" |
| 2001, 2002 | The Education of Max Bickford | (1) Nia Sheppard (2) Student Volunteer | (1) Season 1 Episode 8: "A Very Great Man" (2001) (2) Season 1 Episode 14: "Money Changes Everything" (2002) |
| 2003 | Sex and the City | Pam | Season 6 Episode 4: "Pick-A-Little, Talk-A-Little" |
| 2003 | Queens Supreme | N/A | Season 1 Episode 5: "Mad About You" |
| 2004 | Without a Trace | Layla | Season 2 Episode 18: "Legacy" |
| 2004 | The Sopranos | Amanda Kim | Season 5 Episode 6: "Sentimental Education" |
| 2004 | The Parkers | Shaquan | Season 5 Episode 19: "At Last" |
| 2004–06 | Huff | Maggie Del Rosario | Main role (21 episodes) |
| 2006 | Grey's Anatomy | Noelle Lavatte | Season 3 Episode 6: "Let the Angels Commit" |
| 2006–08 | NCIS | Michelle Lee | Recurring role (Season 4, 6) (12 episodes) |
| 2007 | Monk | Dr. Souter | Season 5 Episode 16: "Mr. Monk Goes to the Hospital" |
| 2008 | ER | Christine | (1) Season 14 Episode 19: "The Chicago Way" (2) Season 15 Episode 4: "Parental Guidance" |
| 2008 | Dexter | Detective Yuki Amado | (Season 3) (1) Season 3 Episode 1: "Our Father" (2) Season 3 Episode 2: "Finding Freebo" (3) Season 3 Episode 4: "All in the Family" (4) Season 3 Episode 6: "Sí Se Puede" (5) Season 3 Episode 7: "Easy As Pie" |
| 2009–10 | Dollhouse | Ivy | Recurring role (10 episodes) |
| 2011 | Traffic Light | Lisa Reilly | Main role (13 episodes) |
| 2012 | Psych | Tina | Season 6 Episode 13: "Let's Doo-Wop It Again" |
| 2012 | Drop Dead Diva | Abby Halstead | Season 4 Episode 4: "Winning Ugly" |
| 2012–13 | Don't Trust the B— in Apartment 23 | Robin | Main role (Season 1); Guest (Season 2) (14 episodes) |
| 2013 | Royal Pains | Erika Seelig | Season 5 Episode 1: "HankWatch" |
| 2013–2014 | Super Fun Night | Helen-Alice | Main role (17 episodes) |
| 2014 | Blue Bloods | Skye Bishop | Season 4 Episode 16: "Insult to Injury" |
| 2014 | Power | Grace Pak | Season 1 Episode 6: "Who You With?" |
| 2015 | Battle Creek | Detective Erin "E" Jacocks | Recurring role (12 episodes) |
| 2015–17 | Con Man | Brenda White | (1) Season 1 Episode 11: "Full Release" (2015) (2) Season 1 Episode 12: "Found and Lost" (2015) (3) Season 1 Episode 13: "Too Much Closure for Comfort" (2015) (4) Season 2 Episode 11: "A Shot with Finley" (2016) (5) Season 2 Episode 12: "Shock to the System" (2016) (6) Season 2 Episode 9: "Back to the Past" (2017) (7) Season 2 Episode 10: "Dawn of Girth" (2017) |
| 2016 | Cooper Barrett's Guide to Surviving Life | Leslie Barrett | Main role (13 episodes) |
| 2016 | Angel from Hell | Jill | Season 1 Episode 1: "Pilot" |
| 2017–18 | 9JKL | Eve Roberts | Main role (16 episodes) |
| 2018 | Animal Kingdom | District Attorney Representative | Season 3 Episode 4: "Wolves" |
| 2018 | The Good Doctor | Nurse Ann Flores | Season 2 Episode 3: "36 Hours" |
| 2019 | NCIS: New Orleans | Araminta Jax | Season 5 Episode 15: "Crab Mentality" |
| 2019 | Unbelievable | Mia | Recurring role (Season 1 Episodes 3, 4, 5, 6, 7, 8) |
| 2019–21 | Nancy Drew | Victoria Fan | (1) Season 1 Episode 4: "The Haunted Ring" (2019) (2) Season 1 Episode 5: "The Case of the Wayward Spirit" (2019) (3) Season 1 Episode 7: "The Tale of the Fallen Sea Queen" (2019) (4) Season 1 Episode 17: "The Girl in the Locket" (2020) (5) Season 2 Episode 15: "The Celestial Visitor" (2021) |
| 2021–25 | The Equalizer | Melody "Mel" Bayani | Main role |
| 2022 | Must Love Christmas | Natalie | Main role |
| 2024 | Dream Productions | Disgust (voice) | 4 episodes |
