= Christina Robinson (actress) =

American actress

- Born: November 8, 1997 (age 28)
- Occupation: Actress
- Years active: 2006–present

Christina Robinson (born November 8, 1997) is an American actress, best known for playing Astor Bennett on the Showtime TV series Dexter.

== Career ==
She starred in the recurring role of Astor Bennett on Showtime's Dexter. She has received two Young Artists Awards nominations for Best Performance in a TV Series - Recurring Young Actress in both 2008 and 2009. She has also done theatre work and has starred in several commercials, including a McDonald's TV commercial. She attended the CARE awards of Universal Studios, Hollywood of 2007.

She has a sister, Courtney Robinson, who is also an actress.

== Filmography ==
| Year | Title | Role | Notes |
|---|---|---|---|
| 2006–2010, 2012 | Dexter | Astor Bennett | Television series; recurring role, 47 episodes Nominated — Screen Actors Guild Award for Outstanding Performance by an Ensemble in a Drama Series (2009, 2010); Nominated — Young Artist Award for Best Performance in a TV Series – Recurring Young Actress (2008, 2009, 2011) |
| 2007 | Arctic Tale | Kid in End Credits | Film; cameo |
| 2009 | Little Miss Badass | Dark Dionne | Short film |
| 2009 | Narcissus Dreams | Melissa | Short film |
| 2010 | Equestrian Sexual Response | Alice | Short film; lead role Nominated for a Young Artist Award for Best Performance in a Short Film – Young Actress |
| 2010 | Simon | Abby | Short film |
| 2016 | Emma's Chance | Lexi Smith | Film |
| 2018 | The Manor | Amy Hunter | Film |
| 2019 | Philophobia: or the Fear of Falling in Love | Becca | Film |
| 2023 | Captive | Mallory | Film |
