= Kristin Dattilo =

American television actress

- Occupation: Actress
- Years active: 1988–present
- Spouse: Jason Keller
- Children: 2
- Relatives: Bryan Dattilo (brother)

Kristin Dattilo is an American television actress, known for playing manager Yola Gaylen on The Chris Isaak Show from 2001 to 2004 and detective Barbara Gianna in season 3 of Dexter.

== Early life ==
Dattilo has two brothers, one of whom is actor Bryan Dattilo. Her hometown is Kankakee, Illinois.

== Career ==
She played the character Nikki Chandler in the 1990 horror film Mirror, Mirror. In 1999, she was Ross Geller's love interest in an episode of Friends. She appeared on an episode of CSI: Crime Scene Investigation, and three episodes of Tracey Takes On..., and made many other television appearances, including Beverly Hills, 90210, Hull High, Angel, Grounded for Life, Veronica Mars and Two and a Half Men.

Dattilo played the titular character in the music video for Aerosmith's 1989 song "Janie's Got a Gun".

== Filmography ==
=== Film ===
Year	Title	Role	Notes
1990	Mirror, Mirror	Nikki Chandler	
1990	The Legend of Grizzly Adams	Kimberly	
1991	Pyrates	Pia	
1992	The Final Judgement	Paula	
1996	Power 98	Betsy	
1996	Two Guys Talkin' About Girls	Angel	Direct-to-video
1996	Infinity	Joan Feynman	
1997	Just Write	Tourist #2	
1998	Some Girl	Suzanne	
2001	Love and Support	Elaine	
2003	Coronado	Claire Winslow	
2003	Intolerable Cruelty	Rex's Young Woman	
2014	Audrey	Joanne	
2018	How to Get Rid of a Body and Still Be Friends	Maddie Harmon	
2019	El Coyote	Sophie Spencer	

=== Television ===
Year	Title	Role	Notes
1988–1989	TV 101	Allison / Venus	3 episodes
1990	21 Jump Street	Allison	Episode: "Blackout"
1990	ABC Afterschool Special	Allison Street	Episode: "A Question About Sex"
1990	Hull High	D.J. Sarkin	9 episodes
1991	Beverly Hills, 90210	Melissa Coolidge	Episode: "One Man and a Baby"
1991	Child of Darkness, Child of Light	Kathleen Beavier	Television film
1991	Parker Lewis Can't Lose	Rita	Episode: "Full Mental Jacket"
1992	Davis Rules	Laura	Episode: "The Moment of Youth"
1992	Cruel Doubt	Student	2 episodes
1993	Camp Wilder	Gina	Episode: "Bringing Up Brody"
1993	Joe's Life	Kelly	Episode: "Yule Be Sorry"
1995	If Someone Had Known	Sharon Liner	Television film
1995	Marker	Elizabeth Cole	Episode: "Discover"
1995	The Office	Deborah Beaumont	6 episodes
1996	Local Heroes	Bonnie	7 episodes
1996–1998	Tracey Takes On...	Marmalade Granger / Mom	3 episodes
1997	Relativity	Suzanne	2 episodes
1997	Hitz	Angela	10 episodes
1998	Rude Awakening	Yvonne	Episode: "Vagina"
1998	Ally McBeal	Laura Payne	Episode: "Story of Love"
1999	Friends	Caitlin	Episode: "The One Where Ross Can't Flirt"
1999	Angel	Harriett 'Harry' Doyle	Episode: "The Bachelor Party"
1999	JAG	Laurie Westin	Episode: "Contemptuous Words"
1999	It's Like, You Know...	Nanny / Cynthia	Episode: "The Apartment"
2000	Grapevine	Diana	Episode: "Matt"
2001–2004	The Chris Isaak Show	Yola Gaylen	47 episodes
2002	The Drew Carey Show	Amy	Episode: "Mama Told Me I Should Come"
2003	Two and a Half Men	Cindy	Episode: "If They Do Go Either Way, They're Usually Fake"
2004	Grounded for Life	Hope	4 episodes
2005	Complete Savages	Mrs. Milfner	Episode: "Teen Things I Hate About You"
2005	Veronica Mars	Carla Cotter	Episode: "Driver Ed"
2006	Courting Alex	Valerie	Episode: "Alex Looks Out for Steven"
2008	CSI: Crime Scene Investigation	Paula Bonfilio	Episode: "The Happy Place"
2008	Dexter	Det. Barbara Gianna	9 episodes
2008	To Love and Die	Nancy	Television film
2009	Southland	Karen Campbell	2 episodes
2009	The Amazing Mrs. Novak	Goldie	Television film
2012	Aubrey	Monica	Episode: "A Tart Finish"
2018	Stuck in the Middle	Sales Lady	Episode: "Stuck in Harley's Quinceañera"
