= Anne Ramsay =

American actress

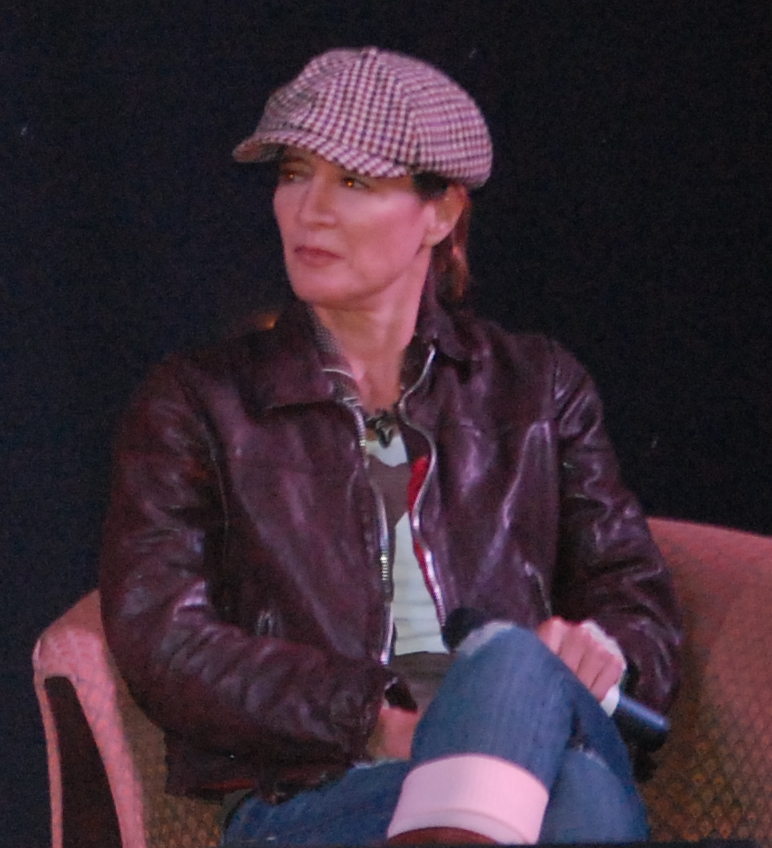
- Ramsay at L6, The L Word fan convention in 2009
- Occupations: Actress, writer
- Years active: 1985–present

Anne Ramsay is an American actress best known for her role as Lisa Stemple on Mad About You.

== Early life ==
Ramsay was raised in La Habra, California.

== Filmography ==
=== Film ===
Year	Title	Role	Notes
1989	A Taste of Hemlock	Barbara	
1991	Class Action	Deborah	
1992	A League of Their Own	Helen Haley	
1992	Critters 4	Dr. McCormick	
1995	Perfect Alibi	Paula Simpson	
1996	The Final Cut	Sergeant Kathleen Hardy	
2000	Woman on Top	TV Director	
2001	Planet of the Apes	Lieutenant Colonel Grace Alexander	
2003	Underground	Jo	Short film
2004	The Monster and the Peanut	Laurie Hunzinger	Short film
2004	A One Time Thing	Sandi	
2005	Heart of the Beholder	Reeba Hollings	
2005	Getting to Know You	Sara	Short film
2006	The Cassidy Kids	Rebecca Vanderpool	
2006	A Merry Little Christmas	Claudia Walden	
2007	Crossing the Line	Angela	Short film
2007	The Death Strip	Dr. Nina Kohler	Short film
2008	The Human Contract	Cheryl	
2009	Wild About Harry	Mrs. Brown	AKA, American Primitive
2009	Tanner Hall	Coffin Vendor	
2009	Off the Ledge	Bonnie	
2010	The Last Rites of Ransom Pride	Singing Girl	
2010	Snapshot	Diane	Short film
2012	Past Due	Linda	Short film
2013	Emanuel and the Truth About Fishes	Female Customer	
2014	The Taking of Deborah Logan	Sarah Logan	
2019	Bombshell	Greta Van Susteren	
2021	Violet	Vanessa	
2023	Brooklyn 45	Marla Sheridan	

=== Television ===
Year	Title	Role	Notes
1987	A Year in the Life	Cindy	Episode: "Dixie Chicken"
1988	Mr. Belvedere	Tanya	Episode: "Fox Trot"
1988	Something Is Out There	Limo Driver	TV miniseries
1988–1989	Star Trek: The Next Generation	Ensign Clancy	Episodes: "Elementary, Dear Data", "The Emissary"
1989	Hunter	Kelly	Episode: "Teen Dreams"
1990	Booker	Lindsey Simmons	Episode: "Crazy"
1990	Doctor Doctor	Dr. Leona Linowitz	Recurring role (4 episodes)
1991	The Man in the Family	Lori	Episode: "Real News"
1992–2019	Mad About You	Lisa Stemple	Regular role (93 episodes)
1993	Murder of Innocence	Linda Keaton	TV film
1996	Chicago Hope	Betsey Hockaday	Episode: "Papa's Got a Brand New Bag"
1996	Everything to Gain	Sarah Kempner	TV film
1997–1998	Dellaventura	Geri Zarias	Main role (14 episodes)
2000	Mysterious Ways	Martha Corday	Episode: "The Midas Touch"
2001	Bad Haircut	Mom	TV film
2001	Dharma & Greg	Nancy	Recurring role (4 episodes)
2001	CSI: Crime Scene Investigation	Claudia Gideon	Episode: "Organ Grinder"
2004	The Hollywood Mom's Mystery	Valerie Jane Ramirez	TV film
2004–2005	The L Word	Robin	Recurring role (4 episodes)
2005	Without a Trace	Laura MacAvoy	Episode: "Penitence"
2005	Six Feet Under	Jackie Feldman	Recurring role (6 episodes)
2005–2006	Related	Trish Houghton	Recurring role (10 episodes)
2006-2007	Close to Home	Lawyer / Roberta Richter	Episodes: "Homecoming", "There's Something About Martha", "Protégé"
2007	House	Emma Sloan	Episode: "Fetal Position"
2007	Tell Me You Love Me	Sally	Episodes: "1.3", "1.9"
2007	Ghost Whisperer	Audrey Asher	Episode: "All Ghosts Lead to Grandview"
2008	The Cleaner	Stephanie Bill	Episode: "House of Pain"
2008	Dexter	Ellen Wolf	Recurring role (6 episodes)
2009	Wizards of Waverly Place	Cindy Van Heusen	Episodes: "Wizards vs. Vampires on Waverly Place", "Tasty Bites"
2009	Castle	Bree Busch	Episode: "Famous Last Words"
2009–2011	Hawthorne	Dr. Brenda Marshall	Recurring role (19 episodes)
2010–2013	The Secret Life of the American Teenager	Nora Underwood	Recurring role (43 episodes)
2012	The Finder	U.S. Marshal Catherine Gibson	Episode: "The Boy with the Bucket"
2012	Drop Dead Diva	Mrs. Yeardley	Episode: "Winning Ugly"
2012	Franklin & Bash	Martha Strauss	Episode: "Last Dance"
2013	Hunt for the Labyrinth Killer	Lisa Couphon	TV film
2014–2015	Hart of Dixie	Winifred Wilkes	Recurring role (5 episodes)
2016	Animal Kingdom	Lila Cole	Episode: "Flesh is Weak"
2020	Equal	FBI Agent	Docuseries
2021–2022	Ordinary Joe	Gwen Kimbreau	Recurring role
2024	CSI:Vegas	Angela Hoppe	Atomic City
2024	Grey's Anatomy	Wanda Gallagher	If Walls Could Talk
