= Jason Manuel Olazabal =

American actor

- Born: October 14, 1973 (age 52); Santa Maria, California, U.S.
- Occupation: Actor
- Years active: 2001–present

Jason Manuel Olazabal (born October 14, 1973), also just known as Jason Olazabal, is an American actor, known for playing Ramon Prado in Showtime TV series Dexter.

== Early life ==
Olazábal was born in Santa Maria, California.

== Career ==
His acting career started in 2001 in Law & Order. He then appeared in The Education of Max Bickford in 2002 and Bad Boys II in 2003 as Detective Marco Vargas. Along with Law & Order, he has starred in Law & Order: Special Victims Unit and Law & Order: Criminal Intent. In 2006, he starred in Charmed and Inside Man. He appeared in House and Numb3rs in 2007. In Season 3 of Dexter, he starred as Ramon Prado in 9 episodes as a lieutenant, grieving over the loss of his brother, and later in the season, his other brother. He jointly received a Screen Actors Guild Award nomination for "Outstanding Performance by an Ensemble in a Drama Series", along with other Dexter co-stars. He appeared in The Unit in 2009 and became a recurring character in Make It or Break It as Alex Cruz.

== Personal life ==
He married actress Sunita Param on February 6, 2004. Jason Manuel Olazabal is also a member of Iota Phi Theta fraternity, initiated at the Fraternity's Beta Sigma Chapter (U. of Northern Colorado) in 1994.

== Filmography ==
Year	Film/Show	Role	Notes
2001	Law & Order	Jeffrey Sayles	
2002	The Education of Max Bickford	Eduardo	
2003	Law & Order	Jeffrey Sayles	
2003	Bad Boys II	Dt. Marco Vargas	
2003	Law & Order: Criminal Intent	Detective Upmann	
2005	Law & Order: Special Victims Unit	Sascha Hart	
2006	Charmed	Java	
2006	Inside Man	ESU Officer Hernandez	
2007	Numb3rs	Jimmy Lopez	
2007	House	Dr. O'Reilly, a.k.a. #11	
2008	This Is Not a Test	Johnny Dorey	
2008	Dexter	Ramon Prado	Nominated - Screen Actors Guild Award for Outstanding Performance by an Ensemble in a Drama Series
2009	The Unit	Mateo	
2009	Make It or Break It	Alex Cruz	
2011	Person of Interest	Hector Alvarez	Season 1 Episode 9 - "Get Carter"
2015	It's Always Sunny in Philadelphia	Worker	Season 10 Episode 7 - "Mac Kills His Dad"
2015	Scorpion	Hector Menjivar	Season 1 Episode 20 - "Crossroads"
2016	Castle	Detective Menendez	Season 8 Episode 14 - "The GSD"
2017	Fear the Walking Dead	Dante Esquivel	Season 3
2017	I Don't Feel at Home in This World Anymore	Cesar	
2026	Lanterns	Hector Hammond	Season 1 Episode 4 - "The Weenie"
