= Valerie Cruz =

American actress

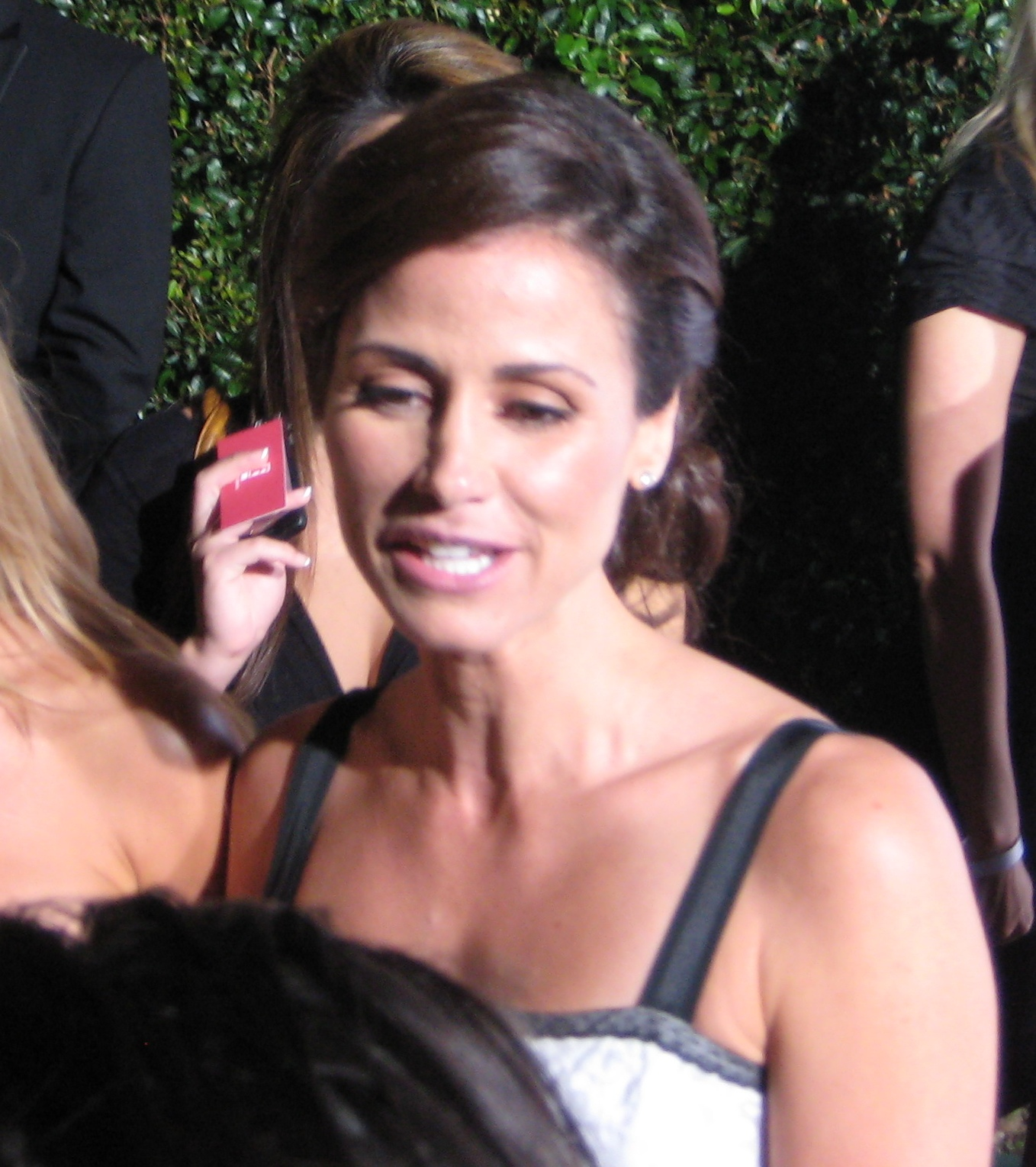
- Cruz in 2008
- Years active: 2002–present

Valerie Cruz is an American actress.

== Early life and education ==
Valerie Cruz is of Cuban ancestry.

She attended Florida State University and received a BFA theatre degree.

== Career ==
Cruz appeared in the film Cellular and played Grace Santiago, a main character in Nip/Tuck, but she left the show just after the first season. She has made guest appearances in series such as Grey's Anatomy and Las Vegas. In 2007, she appeared as Connie Murphy, a tough Chicago police detective, in SciFi Channel's adaptation of The Dresden Files. The show lasted for one season.

Cruz played Maria Nolan on the CW's Hidden Palms. In 2008, she appeared in the third season of Dexter, playing Syl Prado, the wife of assistant district attorney Miguel Prado (Jimmy Smits).

In 2009, she appeared in the horror film The Devil's Tomb and the HBO series True Blood, in which she played the part of Isabel. That same year, Cruz played Olivia in the film La Linea. In 2010 she became part of the cast of the ABC drama Off the Map, which was canceled by ABC on May 13, 2011. In 2011 she had a recurring role as a Homeland Security agent in the Syfy series Alphas.

In 2012, she played an evil doctor in the "Organ Grinder" episode of Grimm; the wife of a dictator in the "Enemy of the State" episode of Scandal; and an investigator for the football league in the episode "Spell It Out" of Necessary Roughness. She also starred on The Following as Agent Gina Mendez.

== Awards ==
- 2008: Nominated, ALMA Award, Best Lead Actress in a Drama Series, for The Dresden Files on SciFi Channel
- 2009: Nominated, Screen Actors Guild Award, Best Ensemble Cast in a Drama Series, for Dexter

== Filmography ==
=== Film ===
Year	Title	Role	Notes
2004	Cellular	Detective Dana Bayback	
2008	No Man's Land: The Rise of Reeker	Allison	
2009	The Line	Olivia	
2009	The Devil's Tomb	Dr. Elissa Cardell	Direct-to-Video
2014	The Loft	Barbara Stevens	
2016	Custody	Claudia Sanjuro	
2016	My First Miracle	Heidi	
2018	Locating Silver Lake	Luisa	

=== Television ===
Year	Title	Role	Notes
2002	Strong Medicine	Almira	"Precautions"
2002	American Family	Officer #1	"La Llorona: Part 1"
2002	The Agency	Ms. Constanza Diaz	"Heartless"
2003	Nip/Tuck	Grace Santiago	Main role (Season 1)
2004	Missing	Karen Moore	"Delusional"
2004	Crossing Jordan	Madeline Pillsbury	"What Happens in Vegas Dies in Boston"
2004	Las Vegas	Madeline Pillsbury	"Two of a Kind"
2005	LAX	Carla	"Mixed Signals"
2005	Grey's Anatomy	Zona Cruz	"No Man's Land"
2005	Inconceivable	Vanessa Calder	"The Last Straw"
2006	Invasion	Colonel Sabrina Lopez	"Re-Evolution", "The Last Wave Goodbye"
2006, 2013	Dexter	Syl Prado	Recurring role (season 3), guest (season 8)
2007	Hidden Palms	Maria Nolan	Recurring role
2007–2008	The Dresden Files	Lieutenant Connie Murphy	Main role
2008	Dexter	Sylvia "Syl" Prado	
2008	Street Warrior	Maggie Kuerner	TV film
2009	Eleventh Hour	Coco Delgado	"Olfactus"
2009	Dollhouse	Selena Ramirez	"A Spy in the House of Love"
2009	True Blood	Isabel Beaumont	Recurring role
2010	Law & Order: Special Victims Unit	U.S. Attorney Camilla Velez	"Shadow"
2010	Criminal Minds	Brooke Sanchez	"Parasite"
2011	Off the Map	Dr. Zee Alvarez	Main role
2011	The Glades	Dr. Sophie Perez	"Dirty Little Secrets"
2011	Alphas	Kathy Sullivan	Recurring role
2012	The Secret Lives of Wives	Alyse	TV film
2012	Grimm	Dr. Levine	"Organ Grinder"
2012	Scandal	Carolina Flores	"Enemy of the State"
2012	Necessary Roughness	Vera Dade	"Spell It Out", "Double Fault"
2012	Homeland	Major Joy Mendez	Recurring role
2013	NCIS	Anna	"Detour"
2014	Bosch	Teresa Corazon	"'Tis the Season"
2014–2015	The Following	Agent Gina Mendez	Regular role
2015	Quantico	Vera Rodriguez	"God."
2017	Chicago Justice	Miranda Sharp	"Lily's Law"
2017	Doubt	Commander Olivia Jimenez	"Top Dog/Underdog"
2018	The Resident	Renata Lopez	"Pilot"
2018	Life Sentence	Gina	Recurring role
2019	The Rookie	Elena Ruiz	"The Checklist", "Free Fall"
2018–2021	Charmed	Marisol Vera	Recurring role (seasons 1–2), guest (season 3)
2022	Walker: Independence	Teresa Davidson	guest
