= David Ramsey =

American actor

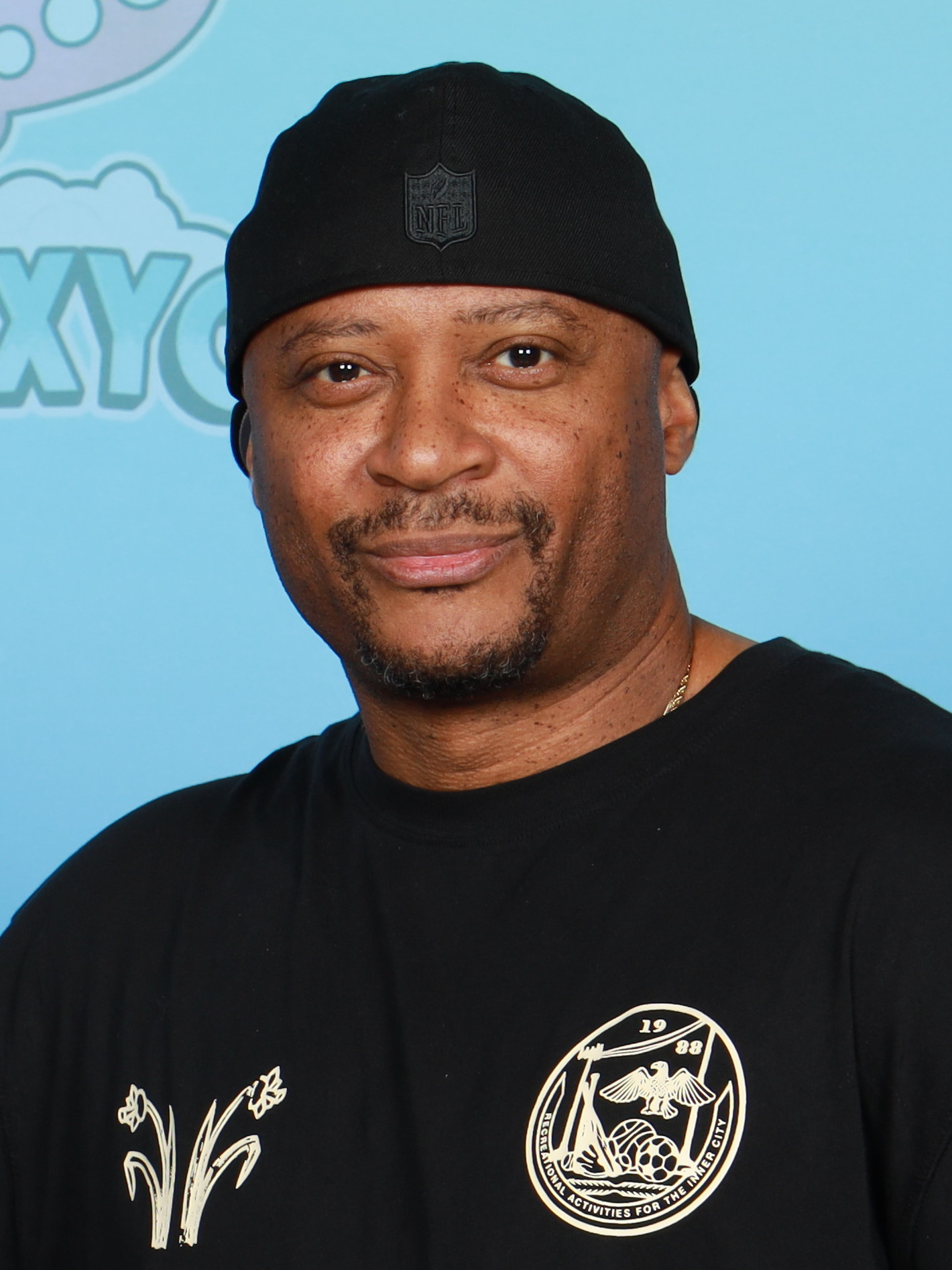
- Ramsey in 2025
- Born: David Paul Ramsey; November 17, 1971 (age 55); Detroit, Michigan, U.S.
- Education: Wayne State University
- Occupations: Actor, director
- Years active: 1987–present
- Spouse: Briana Ramsey (m. 2016)

David Paul Ramsey (born November 17, 1971) is an American actor and director. He is best known for his roles in The CW Arrowverse series Arrow, The Flash, Supergirl, and Batwoman as John Diggle / Spartan, portraying Diggle and Bass Reeves in Legends of Tomorrow, recurring as an alternate universe version of Diggle in Superman & Lois, recurring as Anton Briggs on the Showtime TV series Dexter, and starring in the film Mother and Child (2009) as Joseph.

== Early life ==
Ramsey was born November 17, 1971, in Detroit, Michigan. He was educated at Mumford High School, then attended the 'College of Fine, Performing and Communication Arts' at Wayne State University in Detroit, graduating with a Bachelor of Fine Arts degree.

== Career ==
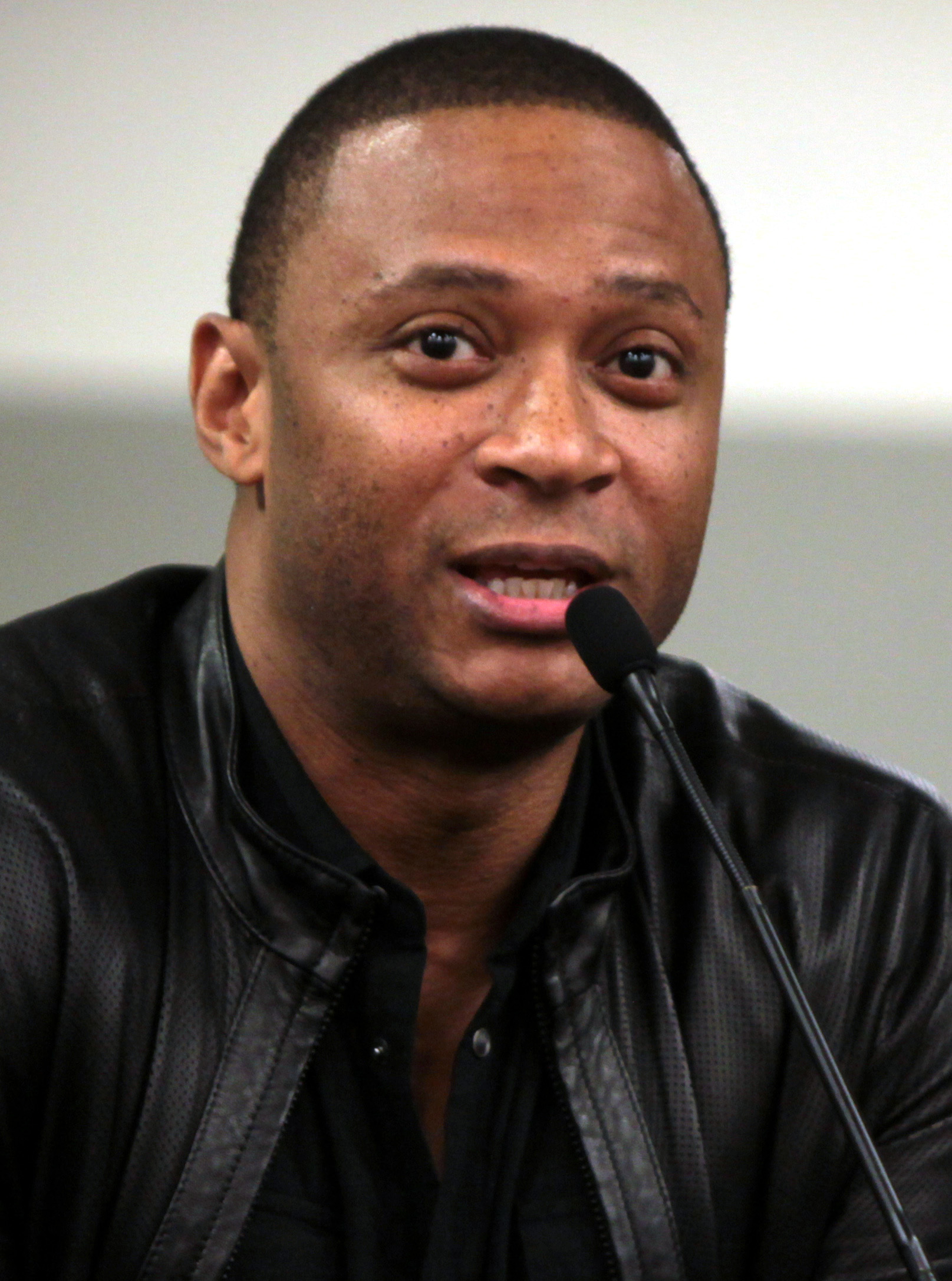
Ramsey in 2014

From 1997 to 1998, he starred as pastor David Randolph in the UPN sitcom Good News. In 2000, he starred as Muhammad Ali in the Fox television film Ali: An American Hero. That year, he appeared in Pay It Forward and started a recurring role in For Your Love. In 2001, he starred as Vince Lee in the South African comedy film Mr Bones. He has also starred in recurring roles in NCIS, All of Us, One on One, The West Wing, CSI: Crime Scene Investigation, Ghost Whisperer, Wildfire, and Hollywood Residential.

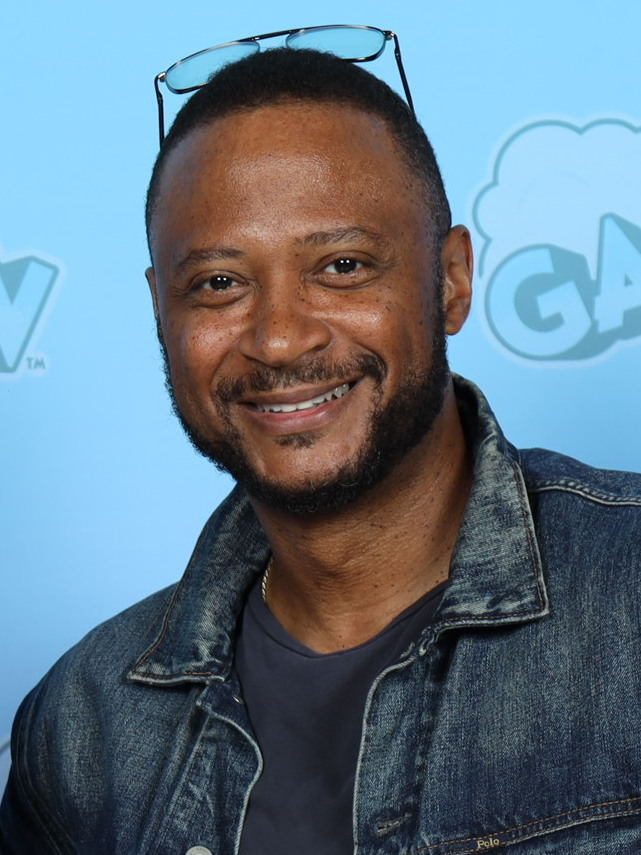
Ramsey in 2023

From 2008 to 2009, he appeared in 17 episodes of Dexter as Anton Briggs, a pot-smoking confidential informant who has an affair with Debra Morgan in Season 3 and at the start of Season 4. In 2010, he appeared in an episode of Grey's Anatomy and in the short-lived NBC courtroom drama series Outlaw. From 2012 to 2020, he appeared in the main cast of CW's superhero show Arrow, as John Diggle, a military veteran who is Oliver's partner, confidant, bodyguard, and later gained an alter ego, Spartan, since the fourth season. The season seven episode "Past Sins" was Ramsey's directorial debut. As part of the greater Arrowverse, Ramsey has reprised his role as Diggle on The Flash, Legends of Tomorrow, Supergirl and Batwoman, as well as portraying an alternate version of the character on the non-Arrowverse Superman & Lois. Ramsey also starred as Mayor Carter Poole in the TV series Blue Bloods .

== Personal life ==
Ramsey is an accomplished Jeet Kune Do practitioner. He has also studied boxing, Taekwondo, Wing Chun, and trained in kickboxing under Benny Urquidez.

== Filmography ==
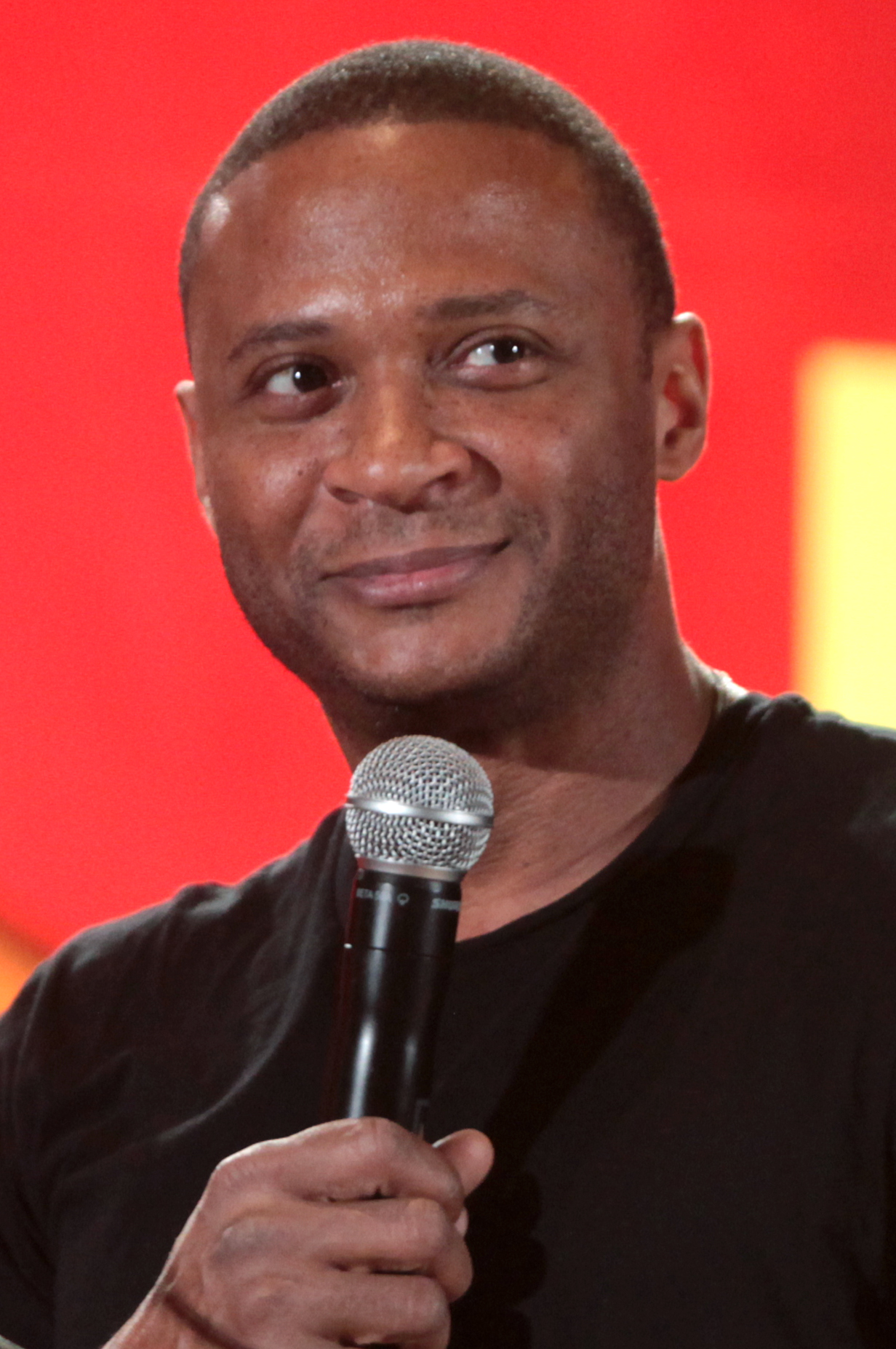
Ramsey at the Phoenix Comiccon in 2016

=== Film ===
Year	Title	Role	Notes
1987	Scared Stiff	George Masterson	
1996	The Nutty Professor	Student	
1996	A Very Brady Sequel	Brent	
1997	Con Air	Londell	
1998	A Short Wait Between Trains	Jenkins	
1999	Three to Tango	Bill	
2000	Pay It Forward	Sidney Parker	
2001	Mr Bones	Vince Lee	
2004	Hair Show	Cliff	
2005	Resurrection: The J.R. Richard Story	J. R. Richard	
2005	Bathsheba	King David	Short film
2007	The Death and Life of Bobby Z	Wayne	
2008	The Coverup	Bill Daily	
2009	The Rub	Cam Stewart	
2009	Mother and Child	Joseph	
2014	Draft Day	Thompson	
2015	Accidental Love	Rep. Bill Harshtone	
2026	Legend of the White Dragon	Mayor Trevon Sterns	

=== Television ===
Year	Title	Role	Notes
1995	Murder One	Reporter #3	Episode: "Chapter Two"
1996	Deutschlandlied	George	Mniseries
1996	Space: Above and Beyond	Supervisor	Episode: "The Angriest Angel"
1996	Her Costly Affair	Shep Walker	Television film
1997–1998	Good News	Pastor David Randolph	Main role
1998	CHiPs '99	Officer Sergeant McFall	Television film
1998	Mama Flora's Family	Booker Palmer (Adult)	Television film
1999	Mutiny	Vernon Nettles	Television film
2000	Ali: An American Hero	Muhammad Ali	Television film
2000–2001	For Your Love	Brian	4 episodes
2001	Girlfriends	Randall	Episode: "Mom's the Word"
2001	Thieves	Agent Victor	Episode: "The Long Con"
2002	For the People	N/A	Episode: "To DNA or Not to DNA"
2002	Romeo Fire	N/A	Television film
2002	The Guardian	Debord's Lawyer	Episode: "No Good Deed"
2002–2003	One on One	Jayden	Episodes: "Everybody Loves Whom?", "It's a Miserable Life"
2003	The Flannerys	Sam Gable	Television film
2003	Strong Medicine	Jake Cortese	Episode: "Breathing Lessons"
2003	NCIS	Special Agent Richard Owens	Episode: "The Curse"
2004	Crossing Jordan	Agent Scannell	Episode: "Is That Plutonium in Your Pocket, or Are You Just Happy to See Me?"
2004	CSI: Miami	Officer Everhart	Episode: "Wannabe"
2004	Charmed	Upper Level Demon	Episode: "Witch Wars"
2004	Second Time Around	Travis Byrd	Episode: "A Kiss Is Still a Kiss"
2005	Central Booking	Troy Stonebreaker	Television film
2005	Huff	Clay	3 episodes
2005	All of Us	Rusty	Recurring role (6 episodes)
2005	Jane Doe: The Wrong Face	Mac	Television film
2005–2008	Ghost Whisperer	Will	4 episodes
2006	Hello Sister, Goodbye Life	Uncle Dennis Klein	Television film
2006	The West Wing	Teddy – Santos's Turnout Briefer	Episodes: "Welcome to Wherever You Are", "Election Day: Part 1"
2006	Fatal Contact: Bird Flu in America	Curtis Ansen	Television film
2006	CSI: Crime Scene Investigation	Gerald Crowley	Episode: "Burn Out"
2007	Criminal Minds	Wakeland	Episode: "Fear and Loathing"
2007	Journeyman	Det. Wilson Hargreaves	Episode: "The Legend of Dylan McCleen"
2008	Hollywood Residential	Don Merritt	Main role
2008	Wildfire	Dr. Noah Gleason	Recurring role
2008–2009	Dexter	Anton Briggs	Recurring role, 17 episodes; Nominated - Screen Actors Guild Award for Outstanding Performance by an Ensemble in a Drama Series
2009	Castle	Jim Wheeler	Episode: "Fool Me Once..."
2010	Grey's Anatomy	Jimmy Thompson	Episode: "Sympathy for the Parents"
2010	Outlaw	Al Druzinsky	Main role
2011–17	Blue Bloods	Carter Poole	Recurring role
2012–2020	Arrow	John Diggle / Spartan / Bass Reeves (Note: Ramsey also portrays Clifford DeVoe / The Thinker (who posed as Diggle) in The Flash episode titled "Think Fast".)	Main role
2014–2023	The Flash	John Diggle / Spartan / Bass Reeves	11 episodes
2016–2021	Legends of Tomorrow	John Diggle / Spartan / Bass Reeves	4 episodes
2017	Illicit	Guy / Husband	Television Film
2018; 2021	Supergirl	John Diggle	2 episodes
2021–2022	Batwoman	John Diggle	2 episodes
2021–2022	Superman & Lois	John Diggle	2 episodes
2022	The Rookie: Feds	Greg Wright	Episode: "Countdown"
2024	Bel-Air	Lamont Alton	2 episodes
2025	The Hunting Party	Arlo Brandt	Episode: "Arlo Brandt"
2026	Tracker	Hale Ripley	Episode: "Breakaway"
2026	9-1-1	Marcus Callahan	Episode: "Who's Your Daddy?"

=== Director ===
Year	Production	Notes
2019	Arrow	2 episodes: "Past Sins" & "Reset"
2021–2023	Superman & Lois	4 episodes: "Man of Steel", "The Ties That Bind", "Truth and Consequences" & "Head On"
2021	Legends of Tomorrow	Episode: "Stressed Western"
2021	Supergirl	Episode: "Blind Spots"
2021	Batwoman	Episode: "A Lesson from Professor Pyg"
2023	All American	Episode: "Stand Up for Something"
