= T.S. Spivet =

T.S. Spivet may refer to:

- The Selected Works of T.S. Spivet, the debut novel by American author Reif Larsen, first published in 2009
- The Young and Prodigious T.S. Spivet, a 2013 Franco-Canadian adventure drama film directed by Jean-Pierre Jeunet and co-written with Guillaume Laurant, an adaptation of the 2010 book above
