= The Following season 1 =

The Following
- Season 1
- DVD cover
- No. of episodes: 15

Release
- Original network: Fox
- Original release: January 21 – April 29, 2013

Season chronology
- Next → Season 2

The first season of the Fox American television psychological thriller horror series The Following premiered on January 21, 2013, and concluded on April 29, 2013, with a total of 15 episodes.

== Plot ==
The first season centers on former FBI agent Ryan Hardy (Kevin Bacon) and his attempts to recapture serial killer Joe Carroll (James Purefoy) following the latter's escape from prison. Hardy soon discovers that the charismatic Carroll has surrounded himself with a group of like-minded individuals (whom he met while teaching and while in prison), and turned them into a cult of fanatical killers. When Carroll's son Joey (Kyle Catlett) is abducted by his father's followers, the FBI discovers that it is the first step in a wider plan for Carroll to escape custody, humiliate Hardy, and be reunited with his ex-wife Claire (Natalie Zea).

== Cast ==
=== Main cast ===
- Kevin Bacon as Ryan Hardy, a former FBI agent, recalled to assist the FBI once Carroll escapes and his cult begins to develop (15 episodes)
- James Purefoy as Joe Carroll, a former professor turned serial killer and cult leader (15 episodes)
- Jeananne Goossen as Jennifer Mason, an FBI Agent who is soon replaced by Debra Parker (1 episode)
- Natalie Zea as Claire Matthews, Joe Carroll's ex-wife, who also had a relationship with Ryan Hardy (13 episodes)
- Annie Parisse as Debra Parker, head of the investigation on Carroll and his cult (14 episodes)
- Shawn Ashmore as Mike Weston, a young FBI agent (12 episodes)
- Valorie Curry as Emma Hill, a follower and romantic partner of Joe Carroll (15 episodes)
- Nico Tortorella as Jacob Wells, one of Carroll's followers and romantic interest of both Emma and Paul (12 episodes)
- Adan Canto as Paul Torres, one of Carroll's followers, working closely with Jacob and Emma (8 episodes)
- Kyle Catlett as Joey Matthews, Joe Carroll and Claire Matthews' son (12 episodes)
- Maggie Grace as Sarah Fuller, the last victim of Joe Carroll before he is captured (1 episode)

=== Recurring ===
- Chinasa Ogbuagu as Deirdre Mitchell, an FBI agent, specializing in following and tracking cult information on the computer (12 episodes)
- John Lafayette as Scott Turner, head of the Marshal's detail participating in the investigation of Carroll's cult (7 episodes)
- Warren Kole as Roderick, Carroll's friend and second in command of the cult (6 episodes)
- Jennifer Ferrin as Molly, one of Carroll's followers, planted to develop a romantic relationship with Ryan Hardy (5 episodes)
- Mike Colter as Nick Donovan, an FBI agent who assumes command of the FBI team following Carroll's second escape from prison (5 episodes)
- Li Jun Li as Megan Leeds, hostage of Paul, Jacob, and Emma (4 episodes)
- Tom Lipinski as Charlie Mead, an ex-militant and member of Carroll's cult assigned to stalk Claire Matthews in the years following Carroll's incarceration (4 episodes)
- Billy Brown as Agent Troy Riley, an FBI agent who initially assisted Hardy in the days following Carroll's escape from prison (3 episodes)
- Steve Monroe as Jordy Raines, a local cop and follower of Carroll (3 episodes)
- Michael Drayer as Rick Kester, follower of Carroll (3 episodes)
- Annika Boras as Louise Sinclair, follower of Carroll and love interest of Roderick (3 episodes)
- Renée Elise Goldsberry as Olivia Warren, Carroll's attorney (3 episodes)
- Christopher Denham as Vince McKinley, follower of Carroll (3 episodes)
- Virginia Kull as Maggie Kester, follower of Carroll (2 episodes)
- Arian Moayed as David, follower of Carroll (2 episodes)

=== Guest cast ===
- Audrey Esparza as Dana Montero in ("Let Me Go")

== Episodes ==
No. overall	No. in season	Title	Directed by	Written by	Original release date	Prod. code	US viewers (millions)
1	1	"Pilot"	Marcos Siega	Kevin Williamson	January 21, 2013	296815	10.42
Infamous serial killer Joe Carroll (James Purefoy) escapes from prison and Ryan Hardy (Kevin Bacon), a retired F.B.I. agent responsible for capturing Joe, is pulled back into the field to assist the manhunt. The police secure both Claire Matthews (Natalie Zea), Joe's ex-wife and mother of his son Joey (Kyle Catlett), with whom Ryan had an affair, and Sarah Fuller (Maggie Grace), the only one of Joe's victims to survive. Assisted by FBI agents Mike Weston (Shawn Ashmore) and Jennifer Mason (Jeananne Goossen), Hardy attempts to track down a prison guard who helped Joe escape and is now being taught how to be a serial killer. When a young woman commits suicide in front of Hardy at Joe's request, saying the same last words as Edgar Allan Poe, Hardy begins to suspect that Joe has used the Internet to create a following of disciples he uses to carry out his plans. Sarah is kidnapped by two such followers (men posing as gay neighbors) and is tortured and killed by Joe. Hardy is too late to save her, but Joe allows himself to be taken back into custody, where he tells Hardy that this is only the beginning. Denise, Joey's live-in nanny who is completely trusted by Claire, is revealed to be another of Joe's followers with her real name being Emma Hill (Valorie Curry), and abducts Joey, who still believes Denise to be his nanny, meeting up with the two men who kidnapped Sarah.
2	2	"Chapter Two"	Marcos Siega	Kevin Williamson	January 28, 2013	2J7402	10.10
Special Agent Debra Parker (Annie Parisse), an expert on alternative religions, joins the case, replacing Agent Mason, as the hunt for Joe's son intensifies. Joe's prison guard protégé Jordy (Steve Monroe) makes his first kill, slaughtering three college girls in their sorority house. Claire tries to discover Joey's whereabouts from Joe, but the interview only serves to reveal her prior relationship with Hardy to everyone. Joey's nanny-turned-kidnapper Emma Hill, having convinced him that he's on an adventure, takes him to an isolated house, along with Sarah Fuller's "gay" neighbors Paul Torres (Adan Canto) and Jacob Wells (Nico Tortorella). Tensions begin to rise between the three as Paul, having pretended to be Jacob's lover for years, is now jealous of the intimate relationship between Jacob and Emma. Hardy is attacked by a Poe masked man while investigating Emma's old residence. Jordy attacks Claire in her home, but Hardy wounds him and he is arrested. Parker delivers a book of Poe's works to Joe in prison, which results in a short but noticeable unspoken communication between the two of them. The next day, the man in the Poe mask lights a seemingly random civilian on fire in a crowd.
3	3	"The Poet's Fire"	Liz Friedlander	Adam Armus & Kay Foster	February 4, 2013	2J7403	9.01
Ryan Hardy and his team obtain video footage of the immolation incident and he recognizes the victim (Todd Faulkner) as a literary critic who gave Joe Carroll's book a scathing review. Emma, Paul and Jacob continue to keep Joey at the house, but Paul confronts Emma about her relationship with Jacob, and she cuts his arm. He leaves the house and picks up a convenience store worker, Megan (Li Jun Li), later knocking her out to kidnap and hold her hostage at the house. Rick Kester (Michael Drayer), who is responsible for killing Faulkner, is also uncovered as another of Joe's followers. His wife, Maggie (Virginia Kull) is found by Hardy and his team and brought in for questioning. She claims to be separated from Kester because he was abusive, having stabbed her on a previous occasion. Kester kills the dean at the college where Joe worked as revenge for his having denied Joe tenure. Maggie returns home under protection by FBI agent Reilly. Meanwhile, special Agent Parker interviews Jordy to try to discover Joey's whereabouts. Jordy says that he does not know where Joey is but that Kester's wife does because she helped plan the abduction, revealing Maggie to be involved. While at Maggie's home, her phone receives a text message from Kester. Agent Reilly reads the message to Maggie out loud that says "now", and she fatally stabs him. Kester arrives, ready to flee with Maggie. Hardy shoots him but Maggie escapes. Jordy, upset because he revealed important information to the FBI, kills himself by swallowing and choking himself on his own bandages. Claire receives a disturbing video of Joey being goaded into killing small animals by Jacob.
4	4	"Mad Love"	Henry Bronchtein	Story by : Andrew Wilder and Kevin Williamson; Teleplay by : Kevin Williamson	February 11, 2013	2J7404	8.79
Emma sees Paul's captive, Megan, as a threat and instructs Paul to kill the woman. Paul hands the knife over to Jacob and threatens Jacob with his menacing secret. Maggie is disclosed by Joe as his follower. Joey locates the phone Emma used to leave a voice mail for Maggie. In a brief conversation with Emma about Jacob, Paul reveals to her that Jacob has been lying to them, and has never actually killed. Ryan Hardy and his team see Maggie in a surveillance footage stabbing a victim in a parking lot after buying puzzling utilities. Hardy receives a call from his sister, Jenny (Susan Misner) and Maggie interrupts the conversation, stating that she has abducted Jenny and wants to trade her for Hardy. Jacob is confronted by Emma, leading him to confess his lies; she orders him to kill Megan as a redemption. Megan, however, pleads for her life and Jacob, unable to kill her, cuts her bonds, telling her to escape. Special Agent Parker gets curious with Hardy's sudden caller, and sends FBI agent, Mike Weston, to go after Hardy. He agrees to help Hardy rescue his sister. Hardy arrives at Jenny's restaurant, and blindfolds himself under Maggie's instruction. Maggie tortures Hardy by putting magnets on top of his body, intending to disturb his pacemaker's functionality. Megan fails to escape and is caught and tied up once again by Emma and Paul. Agent Weston kills Maggie with a single shot to the chest. Jacob finds Megan in the house again and joins Paul and Emma in the shower.
5	5	"The Siege"	Phil Abraham	Rebecca Dameron	February 18, 2013	2J7405	8.39
Joey gets his hands on the hidden phone, while Emma, Paul and Jacob relax in the bedroom. He manages to have an informative conversation with Claire, before Paul pulls him away from the phone. Caroll's attorney, Olivia Warren (Renée Elise Goldsberry) is seen in the department, while Paul continues to convince Jacob to kill Megan. Warren addresses Caroll's "The Following" allegation by quoting Poe's "The Masque of the Red Death" in her press conference that triggers a follower to start his mission. Special Agent Parker deputizes Hardy. Emma reveals one of the followers, Charlie Mead (Tom Lipinski). Warren meets Claire and informs her of Caroll's instruction in order for her to see Joey. Joey escapes from the house and stumbles upon a nearby male neighbor, who leads him to his house after Joey requests to borrow his house phone. Emma finds Joey and convinces him that she will lend him her phone if he comes along with her. The neighbors notify the police. After being told by Emma, Paul breaks into the neighbor's house with a hoe and kills them. Hardy rushes to the location with a police officer. Claire escapes from an FBI agent, Marshall Turner (John Lafayette) who is watching her having lunch with her friend. Emma locks Joey in the bedroom, and finds a man sent by Charlie, Hank Flynn (Josh Segarra), who is to move them out of the house. Hardy arrives at the neighbor's home, only to find that they are both murdered. He tracks the nearby path and sees Jacob and Paul. Hank fatally shoots the police officer, and Hardy later kills Hank. Claire arrives at the location instructed by Warren and follows Charlie. But before Hardy can save Joey, Paul points a gun to his head.
6	6	"The Fall"	Marcos Siega	Shintaro Shimosawa	February 25, 2013	2J7406	8.58
While being held captive with Megan, Hardy is able to cause dissension among Emma, Paul and Jacob. Emma sneaks Joey away while Paul and Jacob scuffle with Hardy; Paul is stabbed by Hardy, who takes the opportunity to help Megan escape. Emma is caught by Weston, who is shot by a local policewoman later revealed to be working with the mysterious "Roderick". Paul and Jacob are able to escape with the help of other Followers disguised as FBI agents. Faced with this turn of events, Hardy, Parker and Weston begin to question their assumptions about the case and realize that The Following is much bigger than a cell of three individuals. Meanwhile, Charlie holds Claire at a remote warehouse, where he mentions that Joe wants her to survive and reveals an attraction for her after years of surveilling her. Turner eventually finds Claire and takes her home, where she is upset that Emma escaped with Joey. It is also revealed that Agent Parker grew up in a cult with her parents, leading to her expert knowledge of the subject.
7	7	"Let Me Go"	Nick Gomez	Seamus Kevin Fahey	March 4, 2013	2J7407	8.81
Carroll's lawyer, Olivia Warren, is able to arrange his transfer to another jail. The FBI are wary of the transfer and monitor every step, save for the actual exit of the van. Frustrated, Hardy begins to suspect that Carroll either has Followers inside the system, or that he is coercing someone to do his bidding. His suspicions are confirmed when Weston realizes the tape of the prisoner loading bay has been doctored. They quickly identify the prison warden as the likely culprit, learning that his daughter has disappeared without explanation. Hardy relays his suspicions to Parker, who has the transport van pull over. She and the Marshals responsible for the transfer discover Carroll is not in the van. When confronted, the warden admits Carroll's people coerced him, but he has no knowledge of where Carroll is. Carroll was assisted in his escape by Olivia Warren, whom he forces to call Hardy. He strangles her while Hardy listens. Hardy and Weston arrive on the scene and pursue Carroll through a building where Carroll reveals he has planned all of this for "years" before escaping. With help from a Follower, Carroll arrives at a mansion where dozens of more followers appear to greet him. Then Carroll sees Joey as an older child for the first time.
8	8	"Welcome Home"	Joshua Butler	Amanda Kate Shuman	March 11, 2013	2J7408	8.15
Distracted by the search for Joey and unable to find any leads in Carroll's escape, the FBI lose faith in Hardy's ability to catch him and his followers and usher in a new agent to oversee the investigation. As Hardy and Parker become frustrated with having to play office politics whilst conducting a manhunt, Carroll's plans escalate even further as he puts its next stage into action. Carroll selects Agent Weston to be the victim and has his followers abduct him. With Weston in their captivity, the followers begin torturing and interrogating the young agent for Claire's whereabouts, to which he insists he does not know, by beating him with fists and metal poles before stabbing him in the stomach and leaving him for dead. With Ryan arriving in time to call an ambulance, he learns that now bedridden Weston not only knows Claire's location, but is the only one who does. Upon returning home, Charlie allows Joe to kill him in penance for failing him, while Joe and Emma later end up sleeping together after Emma seduces him.
9	9	"Love Hurts"	Marcos Siega & Adam Davidson	Adam Armus & Kay Foster	March 18, 2013	2J7409	8.34
Carroll reaches out to Hardy with an unusual request, and despite the threat of swift and violent retribution if his demands are not met, Hardy realizes that he might be holding onto a bigger bargaining chip than first thought. Joe sends followers Amanda Porter and Louise on a mission to kill women named Claire Matthews in an effort to force Joe's ex out of hiding. After two of three remaining Claires are killed, Amanda tracks the third one down at the same time Ryan does. After killing Louise, Ryan gets into a confrontation with Amanda, who tells Ryan he needs to be punished for sleeping with Joe's wife. Ryan admits he did so because he loves Claire and tempts Amanda to kill him; Ryan disarms her and has her arrested.
10	10	"Guilt"	Joshua Butler	Kevin Williamson & Shintaro Shimosawa	March 25, 2013	2J7410	6.66
Knowing that it is only a matter of time before Carroll finds her, Hardy must outsmart a group of followers and move Claire to a safe place. Jacob and Emma are reunited, but the meeting turns sour. Roderick goes after Claire, along with two military followers, Ryan and Claire manage to escape and go to Ryan's friend Tyson's home. Tyson reveals to Claire that after Ryan and her ended their relationship, he introduced Ryan to a friend named Molly, though they did not last very long as Ryan was only serious about Claire. Ryan notices that Claire has been tracked by Roderick as they prepare for his arrival. Emma and Jacob try to work things out, but with Jacob seeing Paul's ghost everywhere, Jacob tells Emma that she's dead to him. Tyson manages to take down one follower, but is shot by another. Claire willingly gives herself up to Roderick, but not before she and Ryan reaffirm their love for each other. Ryan then receives a call from Joe who informs Ryan his story is not done yet. At Joe's home, he is visited by Molly, who is revealed to be a follower, assigned to watch over Ryan.
11	11	"Whips and Regret"	Marcos Siega	Kevin Williamson & Rebecca Dameron	April 1, 2013	2J7411	6.57
Claire is abducted by Carroll's followers, but Hardy and Parker refuse to let her go without a fight. Meanwhile, the FBI look inward, investigating the connection between one of their own safehouses and a crime committed by a member of Carroll's cult. They find a lead to a bunker, to which they find out that it's a boot camp of followers and are forced to kill the followers in training. Claire is forced to have dinner with Joe. She asks to see her son but Joe refuses, which causes Claire to storm off. Joe is informed by Roderick of losing the bunker, which causes Joe to snap at Roderick to not make orders anymore. Joe eventually lets Claire reunite with her son. Joe later talks with Molly and has data on Ryan given to him. A flashback reveals Molly joining Joe on the condition she be the one to kill Ryan when the time is right. Back with Ryan, he is greeted by Molly, who is revealed to be his next door neighbor.
12	12	"The Curse"	David Von Ancken	Seamus Kevin Fahey & Amanda Kate Shuman	April 8, 2013	2J7412	6.30
Hardy, Parker, and Weston seek out a militia leader with ties to Carroll's cult. Meanwhile, Joe has hit a roadblock with his book as he struggles to understand what motivates Hardy, and takes Jacob and Vincent to kill the militia leader before he can talk. While Claire tries to escape with Joey, they are blocked by various followers and Roderick puts an ankle monitor on her. Afterwards, Claire discovers Joe's book and is reunited with Emma, which turns sour and results in the two physically fighting. Mike is held hostage by Joe while Debra is held by Jacob. Joe questions what motivated Ryan into saving people and discovers it was because of his father's death. The duo escape and return home, only for it to turn sour for Joe as he discovers Claire having read his book and expresses her disdain of it. Ryan and the FBI are then greeted by the local Sheriff, Tim Nelson (Roderick).
13	13	"Havenport"	Nicole Kassell	David Wilcox & Vincent Angell	April 15, 2013	2J7413	6.36
After being recognized at a police station by Weston, Roderick is forced to go on the run, and his disagreements with Joe come to a head when he abducts Joey as "insurance" against Carroll and the FBI. Roderick is caught by Ryan and says he'll give up Joey if he gets his freedom. Ryan releases him, but Roderick is killed by Joe's followers for his betrayal, and Joey is rescued by Hardy and Weston after a standoff with Jacob. Claire takes advantage of Joe's affections of her and seduces him before stabbing him. Overcome with pain and frustration, Carroll calls Hardy and informs him that he plans to kill Claire, finally accepting he'll never get her to love him again.
14	14	"The End is Near"	Joshua Butler	Adam Armus & Kay Foster	April 22, 2013	2J7414	7.04
Frustrated with his writing, drinking heavily and taking numerous medications and bleeding from his open wound, Joe becomes increasingly unstable, and his erratic behavior destroys morale among his followers, especially Jacob. As Hardy and the FBI launch a raid on their compound, the cult retaliates with an attack on an evacuation center in Havenport, giving Joe the chance to get away safely. With Hardy distracted at the evacuation center, cult members capture Parker and bury her alive. Emma and Jacob recapture Claire, and with their help, Joe escapes with Claire on a boat. Jacob expresses a desire to leave his cult life behind, but Emma kills him before he can do so.
15	15	"The Final Chapter"	Marcos Siega	Kevin Williamson	April 29, 2013	2J7415	7.82
An angry and injured Joe Carroll escapes with Claire to a secluded island lighthouse. While investigating Parker's whereabouts, the FBI are attacked by a sniper, who Hardy and Weston capture and torture. The two finally discover Parker's location, but they arrive too late and find Parker has suffocated. Enraged at Alex for mocking Debra's death, Hardy shoots him in cold blood. Hardy discovers Carroll's unfinished manuscript in her coffin, which leads him to a location where Emma drugs and captures him. He wakes up in the lighthouse, and his confrontation with Carroll comes to blows. Their fight takes them to a boathouse where a rogue gunshot ignites tanks of gasoline; Hardy manages to escape as the building explodes with Carroll trapped inside. The FBI believes Carroll is dead, and Hardy takes Claire back to his apartment where Molly stabs both of them.

== Ratings ==
DVR Ratings for season 1 of The Following
Episode No.	Title	Original air date	DVR 18–49	DVR viewers (millions)	Total 18–49	Total viewers
1	"Pilot"	January 21, 2013	1.9	4.68	5.1	15.10
2	"Chapter Two"	January 28, 2013	1.8	4.11	5.1	14.21
3	"The Poet's Fire"	February 4, 2013	1.8	4.21	4.7	13.22
4	"Mad Love"	February 11, 2013	1.7	3.73	4.1	11.53
5	"The Siege"	February 18, 2013	1.6	3.73	4.5	12.12
6	"The Fall"	February 25, 2013	1.5	3.67	4.3	12.25
7	"Let Me Go"	March 4, 2013	1.7	3.79	4.5	12.60
8	"Welcome Home"	March 11, 2013	1.7	3.85	4.4	12.01
9	"Love Hurts"	March 18, 2013	1.7	3.95	4.2	11.29
10	"Guilt"	March 25, 2013	1.6	3.72	3.9	10.38
11	"Whips and Regret"	April 1, 2013	1.7	3.79	3.9	10.36
12	"The Curse"	April 8, 2013	1.7	4.04	3.9	10.34
13	"Havenport"	April 15, 2013	1.7	3.95	3.8	10.33
14	"The End is Near"	April 22, 2013	1.8	3.92	4.2	10.97
15	"The Final Chapter"	April 29, 2013	1.4	3.50	4.1	11.32
