= Divide, Montana =

Rural community in Silver Bow County, Montana, United States

Coordinates: 45°45′04″N 112°44′47″W

Divide is a rural community in Silver Bow County, Montana, United States. It is administered as part of Butte.

== History ==
The community's name is based on its proximity to the Continental Divide. As a station on the Union Pacific Railroad, Divide served as a distribution and stock shipping point for ranchers in the Big Hole Valley.

== Geography ==
Divide is located in the valley of the Big Hole River surrounded by Montana's Pioneer Mountains. The Big Hole River and its creek tributaries provide irrigation for agriculture as well as habitat for several species of trout which support a recreational fishery. Divide is crossed by Interstate 15 and Montana State Highways 43 and 91, as well as the Union Pacific Railroad, although it is no longer served by a station. The population in 2010 was 221 people.

=== Climate ===
According to the Köppen Climate Classification system, Divide has a semi-arid climate, abbreviated "BSk" on climate maps.

Climate data for Divide, Montana, 1991–2020 normals, extremes 1915–present: 5350ft (1631m)
Month	Jan	Feb	Mar	Apr	May	Jun	Jul	Aug	Sep	Oct	Nov	Dec	Year
Record high °F (°C)	58 (14)	61 (16)	70 (21)	80 (27)	92 (33)	96 (36)	98 (37)	96 (36)	91 (33)	84 (29)	71 (22)	59 (15)	98 (37)
Mean maximum °F (°C)	48.8 (9.3)	50.9 (10.5)	62.5 (16.9)	70.8 (21.6)	79.0 (26.1)	86.1 (30.1)	91.9 (33.3)	90.8 (32.7)	85.3 (29.6)	76.2 (24.6)	59.1 (15.1)	49.6 (9.8)	92.8 (33.8)
Mean daily maximum °F (°C)	32.7 (0.4)	35.6 (2.0)	44.9 (7.2)	52.3 (11.3)	61.8 (16.6)	69.9 (21.1)	81.6 (27.6)	80.3 (26.8)	70.2 (21.2)	56.5 (13.6)	41.7 (5.4)	31.2 (−0.4)	54.9 (12.7)
Daily mean °F (°C)	21.6 (−5.8)	23.6 (−4.7)	32.2 (0.1)	39.3 (4.1)	48.3 (9.1)	55.5 (13.1)	63.9 (17.7)	62.3 (16.8)	53.3 (11.8)	42.0 (5.6)	29.4 (−1.4)	20.0 (−6.7)	40.9 (5.0)
Mean daily minimum °F (°C)	10.5 (−11.9)	11.7 (−11.3)	19.5 (−6.9)	26.3 (−3.2)	34.9 (1.6)	41.1 (5.1)	46.2 (7.9)	44.2 (6.8)	36.5 (2.5)	27.5 (−2.5)	17.0 (−8.3)	8.8 (−12.9)	27.0 (−2.8)
Mean minimum °F (°C)	−14.2 (−25.7)	−8.3 (−22.4)	3.1 (−16.1)	13.7 (−10.2)	20.2 (−6.6)	30.7 (−0.7)	36.2 (2.3)	33.0 (0.6)	25.3 (−3.7)	10.4 (−12.0)	−7.6 (−22.0)	−11.6 (−24.2)	−22.2 (−30.1)
Record low °F (°C)	−51 (−46)	−35 (−37)	−19 (−28)	0 (−18)	13 (−11)	26 (−3)	24 (−4)	26 (−3)	8 (−13)	−9 (−23)	−31 (−35)	−35 (−37)	−51 (−46)
Average precipitation inches (mm)	0.27 (6.9)	0.55 (14)	0.67 (17)	0.89 (23)	1.78 (45)	2.10 (53)	1.05 (27)	1.02 (26)	1.13 (29)	0.83 (21)	0.50 (13)	0.51 (13)	11.30 (287)
Average snowfall inches (cm)	2.4 (6.1)	2.0 (5.1)	2.6 (6.6)	0.8 (2.0)	0.1 (0.25)	0.0 (0.0)	0.0 (0.0)	0.0 (0.0)	0.1 (0.25)	0.9 (2.3)	1.7 (4.3)	4.6 (12)	15.2 (38.9)
Average precipitation days (≥ 0.01 in)	2.7	2.6	3.8	5.1	8.2	9.9	6.0	5.8	4.0	4.2	3.9	3.2	59.4
Average snowy days (≥ 0.1 in)	2.4	2.1	1.6	0.7	0.1	0.0	0.0	0.0	0.1	0.6	1.1	2.3	11.0
Source 1: NOAA
Source 2: XMACIS2 (records & monthly max/mins)

== Literary association ==
Divide is an important setting for Reif Larsen's novel The Selected Works of T.S. Spivet. It is the home of the central character and the beginning of his hobo railroad journey across the United States. The community's location on the continental divide serves as a major piece of symbolism in the novel.
