= List of The Following characters =

Season two main characters, from left to right: Mike Weston, Ryan Hardy, Lily Gray, Emma Hill, Luke, and Joe Carroll

The Following is an American television drama series, which premiered on Fox on January 21, 2013 about an FBI agent trying to catch a serial killer and his murderous cult. The series was created by Kevin Williamson and is jointly produced by Outerbanks Entertainment and Warner Bros. Television.

The series protagonist, Ryan Hardy, is portrayed by Kevin Bacon. Hardy initially works alongside Mike Weston (Shawn Ashmore), Debra Parker (Annie Parisse), and eventually his niece Max Hardy (Jessica Stroup) to put an end to antagonist Joe Carroll (James Purefoy) and his cult of killers.

On March 4, 2013, the series was renewed for a second season to air in 2014, and, on March 7, 2014, renewed for a third season to air in 2015.

== Cast ==
Actor	Character	Seasons		
Actor	Character	1	2	3
=== Main ===
Kevin Bacon	Ryan Hardy	Main	Main	Main
James Purefoy	Joe Carroll	Main	Main	Main
Shawn Ashmore	Mike Weston	Main	Main	Main
Valorie Curry	Emma Hill	Main	Main	
Natalie Zea	Claire Matthews	Main	Main	
Annie Parisse	Debra Parker	Main		
Nico Tortorella	Jacob Wells	Main		
Adan Canto	Paul Torres	Main		
Kyle Catlett	Joey Matthews	Main		
Jessica Stroup	Max Hardy		Main	Main
Sam Underwood	Mark Gray		Main	Main
Sam Underwood	Luke Gray		Main	
Connie Nielsen	Lily Gray		Main	
Tiffany Boone	Mandy Lang		Main	
Gregg Henry	Dr. Arthur Strauss		Recurring	Main
Zuleikha Robinson	Gwen			Main
Michael Ealy	Theo Noble			Main
=== Recurring ===
John Lafayette	Marshal Scott Turner	Recurring	Recurring	Guest
Mike Colter	Nick Donovan	Recurring		Recurring
Warren Kole	Roderick	Recurring		
Annika Boras	Louise Sinclair	Recurring		
Billy Brown	Troy Riley	Recurring		
Michael Drayer	Rick Kester	Recurring		
Jennifer Ferrin	Molly	Recurring		
Renée Elise Goldsberry	Olivia Warren	Recurring		
Li Jun Li	Megan Leeds	Recurring		
Tom Lipinski	Charlie Mead	Recurring		
Steve Monroe	Jordy Raines	Recurring		
Chinasa Ogbuagu	Deidre Mitchell	Recurring		
Valerie Cruz	Agent Gina Mendez		Recurring	Recurring
Felix Solis	Agent Clarke		Recurring	Guest
Carrie Preston	Judy		Recurring	
Camille De Pazzis	Gisele		Recurring	
Kyle Barisich	Hopkins		Recurring	
Montego Glover	Agent Lawrence		Recurring	
Bambadjan Bamba	Sami		Recurring	
Rita Markova	Radmilla		Recurring	
Shane McRae	Robert		Recurring	
Jake Weber	Micah		Recurring	
Jacinda Barrett	Julia		Recurring	
Sprague Grayden	Carrie Cooke		Recurring	
Mackenzie Marsh	Tilda		Recurring	
Tom Cavanagh	Kingston Tanner		Recurring	
Josh Salatin	Lucas		Recurring	
Liza de Weerd	Angela		Recurring	
Carter Jenkins	Preston Tanner		Recurring	
Leslie Bibb	Jana Murphy		Recurring	
Michael Irby	Andrew Sharp			Recurring
Gbenga Akinnagbe	Tom Reyes			Recurring
Ruth Kearney	Daisy Locke			Recurring
Monique Gabriela Curnen	Erin Sloan			Recurring
Hunter Parrish	Kyle Locke			Recurring
Anna Wood	Juliana Barnes			Recurring
Glenn Fleshler	Neil Perry			Recurring
Tim Guinee	Duncan Banks			Recurring
Megalyn Echikunwoke	Penny Tyler			Recurring
Annet Mahendru	Eliza			Recurring

== Major characters ==
=== Ryan Hardy ===
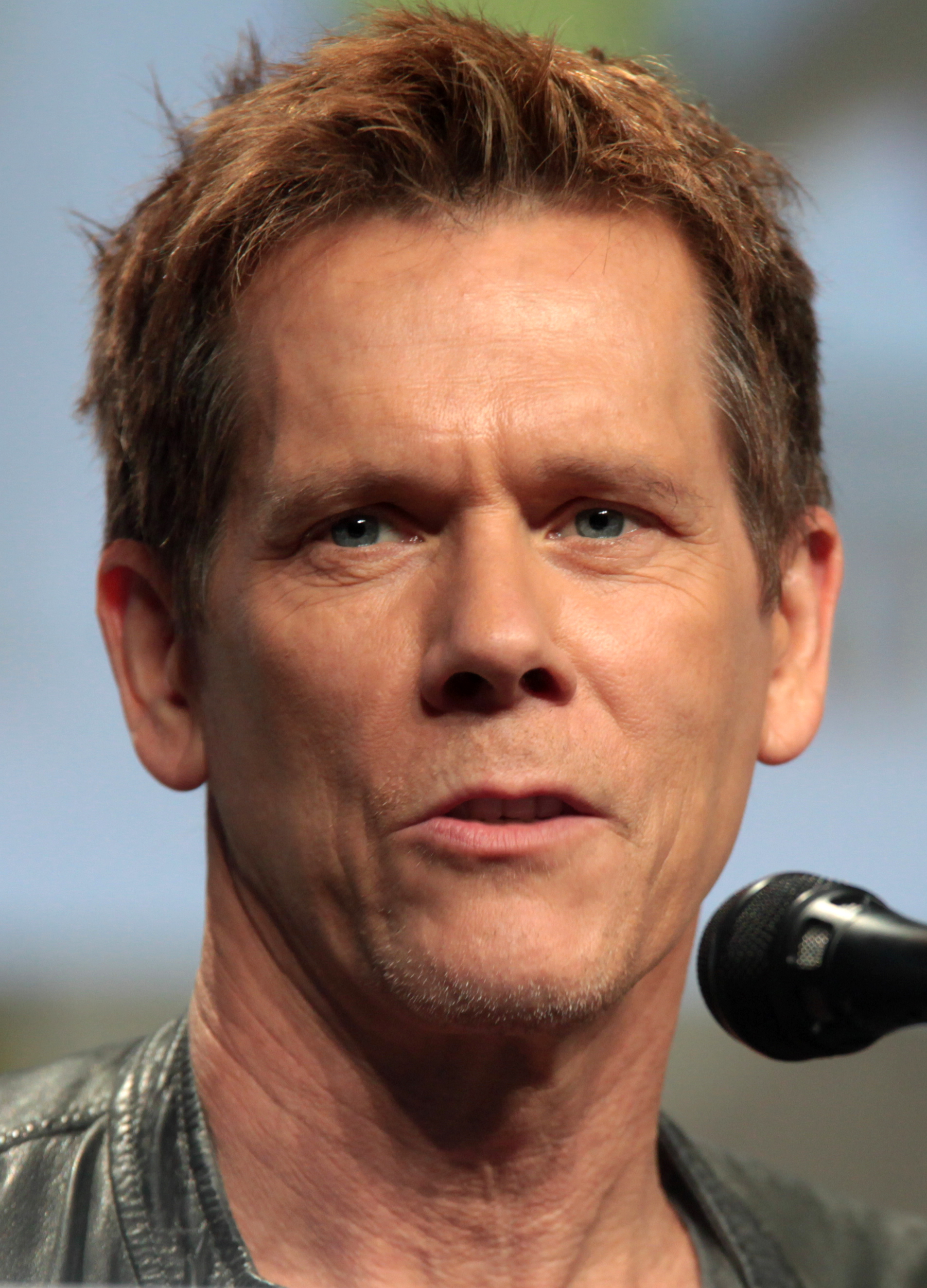
Kevin Bacon portrays Ryan Hardy.

Portrayed by Kevin Bacon, Hardy is a former FBI agent who, in 2003, led the FBI team that captured serial killer Joe Carroll. He was placed on disability and removed from active duty after being stabbed in the heart by Carroll. His injuries require him to use a pacemaker. Hardy is recalled to service as a consultant after Carroll escapes from prison. At the beginning of the series, he is withdrawn from the world, bordering on alcoholism, tormented by guilt as he failed to identify Carroll as a suspect after their first meeting, and Carroll claimed five more victims before he was caught; however, later in the series, Hardy begins to open up to his colleagues and, later, Claire Matthews. Hardy wrote a true-crime book based on the Joe Carroll case, entitled The Poetry of a Killer. In the season 1 finale, Ryan fights Joe in a boat house to save Claire, and Joe is left inside, presumably to die. After DNA records confirm Joe's death, Ryan and Claire resume their relationship at his apartment, only for his neighbor Molly, one of Joe's followers, to stab them both. Ryan overpowers Molly and kills her. While he survives, Ryan is told that Claire died, which devastates him.

By season 2, after Claire's death, Ryan has started having a more active life, being healthy and sober, becoming a professor at the Hudson University, and opening up more, specifically to his niece, Max Hardy. However, his obsessive belief that Joe is alive is strong. His fears are proven true in "Fly Away" as he sees Joe drive away from Lily Gray's home, along with Emma and Mandy. He is called in to track Lily and her twin sons Luke and Mark, followers of Joe and murderer of Mike Weston's father. Discovering Joe's revival and finding a new cult, Ryan resolves to end Joe for good. After discovering that Claire faked her death, Ryan attempts to restore his relationship with her. In the season 2 finale, Luke and Mark kidnap Claire and force Ryan to work with Joe to save her, which they do. Luke is killed while Mark escapes. Ryan subdues Joe, resists the urge to kill him, and has him arrested. He and Claire go their separate ways as Claire believes her past will bring them down.

In season 3, Ryan has found love with a doctor, called Gwen. At an FBI agent's wedding, one of the waiters throws blood over Ryan and the two brides, for Ryan killing his daughter, who was a Korbin member. When Ryan goes to the house of the girl to apologise to the parents, he discovers that the man wasn't her father, and later finds that he is instead working for Mark Gray, who is attempting to avenge the deaths of his mother, twin and sister.

After Arthur Strauss walks from court after being charged with the attempted murder of Ryan and Ryan's former lover, Ryan and the FBI look to find out who made a fake email which helped release Strauss. They later discover that it was a man named Theo Noble, one of Strauss' former students. They discover that Theo has many different aliases and is a genius in computing and hacking, and had hacked the FBI's server on more than one occasion to remain a step ahead. However, when Theo realises that they have pulled his wife's records, he realises that his double life has been exposed and kills his wife and attempts to kill his kids, who were all part of his cover family. The kids survived. Theo blames Ryan for forcing his hand and making him kill his wife. Ryan then finds out that there is one person that Theo genuinely cares about, his sister, Penny, who, like Theo, was abused as a child and had gone from foster family to foster family.

On the day of Joe's execution, Joe kills two guards and takes 3 people hostage, and reveals that he will kill them unless Ryan comes and visits him. Ryan had previously rejected an invitation from Joe to watch him die. Ryan heads over to the prison, and manages to get Joe to release the hostages by admitting to having dreams in which he and Joe are good friends and Joe even helps teach Ryan to kill. However, Theo's sister, Penny, who was watching Ryan and Joe on computer monitors, releases the other prisoners, in an attempt to have Ryan killed so that Theo would stop pursuing Ryan. This fails however as Ryan and Joe work together and kill the attacking prisoners. Joe's execution then goes ahead as planned and Ryan watches as his long-term foe dies.

After the execution, Ryan goes to a bar, and repeatedly orders two shots of whiskey, as he imagines that he is drinking with Joe. Ryan then sleeps with the bartender, however he tells Gwen the next day as he feels guilty, Gwen leaves him.

Ryan starts drinking again, having been 18 months sober, and even drinks at work. When Ryan and Max keep look out for Penny, they spot her, but she seemingly escapes. However, Ryan has actually caught her and takes her to his apartment to torture her. Ryan waterboards Penny as Penny has a fear of water and drowning. However, after Theo learns that Ryan has his sister, Theo kidnaps Mike, and offers a fair trade, Penny for Mike. The trade goes according to plan, until Theo and Ryan begin shooting at one another, and Ryan shoots Penny, who was between him and Theo. Theo leaves but swears revenge on Ryan for killing the only person he cares about.

After using Ryan's former colleague, Gina Mendez, and her family, as bait, Ryan goes to a safehouse where Mendez was staying, but brings a small team of agents that he trusts to bring Theo down; however, Theo runs away and wounds an FBI agent in the process. Theo ambushes Ryan as he tries to call an ambulance for the wounded agent, and Theo takes the two agents hostage.

After killing the other agent, Theo prepares to murder Ryan, but is stopped in the nick of time by guards of a rich financer, Eliza, who falsely believes that Ryan knew her dark secrets and wanted Theo to bring Ryan to her so she could find out what he knows. While Theo is being tortured, Ryan frees his hands which were tied behind his back, and escapes. However, Theo also escapes and tells Ryan that he is going to get to Gwen, and kill her once Ryan's baby is born. He also says that he will ensure that the baby will be exactly like Theo, abused and neglected.

After Theo kidnaps Gwen, Ryan chases them down and shoots Theo, seemingly killing him. However, as Ryan and Gwen embrace, Theo tackles Ryan and they both fall off a bridge. Theo falls into the water, while Ryan holds on to the side of the bridge, but lets go after telling Gwen that he loves her. Neither Ryan's nor Theo's body was recovered.

In the last scene of the show, the camera follows a limping man moving through the hospital where Gwen, Mike and Max are. The man goes to Agent Campbell's room, where she is recovering from a gunshot wound. The man is then found to be Ryan, who tells Campbell that he knows that she was a double agent and was responsible for Gwen's kidnapping. Ryan tells her that those he loves are not safe with him around, and says that he will pick apart those who pose a threat to his loved ones while the world thinks he's dead. It is then implied that he kills Campbell. Ryan then walks through the halls, stopping to look at Gwen, Mike and Max, before leaving the hospital to begin his new life as a vigilante.

=== Joe Carroll ===
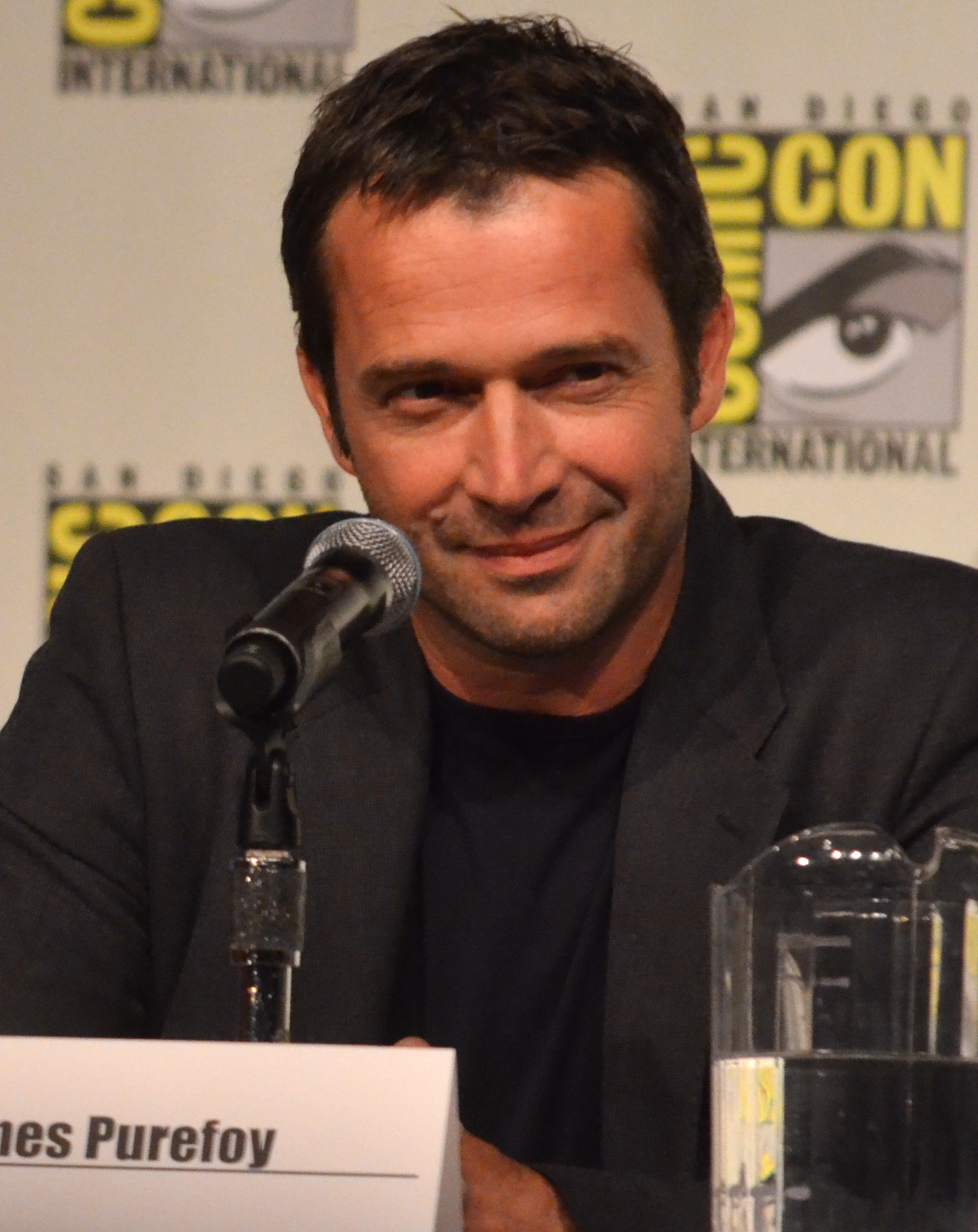
James Purefoy portrays Joe Carroll.

Portrayed by James Purefoy. He is a former professor of English literature at Winslow University. Little is known of his early life, other than that he was born in England and has a half-brother. Carroll's teaching emphasized the romantic period. He believes, like Edgar Allan Poe, whom he admires intensely, in the "insanity of art", i.e. that it has to be "felt". Carroll began making "art" by eviscerating female students. He killed fourteen of them before he was caught by Ryan Hardy. While serving out his sentence at the Virginia Central Penitentiary in Waverly, Virginia, Carroll gathers a cult-like collection of followers who are willing to murder, kidnap, and sacrifice themselves for Carroll to execute his plan of revenge against Hardy. In the season finale, Carroll is apparently killed in a massive explosion outside his lighthouse after a brutal showdown with Hardy.

In Season 2, it is confirmed he survived and has been hiding. When Joe attempts to return to his old ways, he meets Lily Gray, a follower of him and a brief love interest, as they spend the night at the end of "Reflection", but he leaves her after she drugs him and Joe expresses his contempt for her. He then travels to a cult called Korban and, after manipulating (and later killing) the leader Micah and his wife Julia, becomes the new leader of Korban with the intent of raining havoc on New York. As Joe explains to Ryan, he has moved on from Poe (he has also given up all dreams of becoming a writer) to the Bible (which is ironic as Joe does not believe in God). He starts a "Holy War" with Kingston Tanner, a televangelist who views Joe as the anti-Christ. Joe kidnaps Tanner's son and forces him to kill someone, then has his father get on his knees to admit there is no God. He tries to force them to kill one another, but Kingston kills himself while Joe kills Preston later. In the season 2 finale, Ryan is forced to work with Joe to save Claire from Luke and Mark. Joe is then captured again by Ryan and sent to prison despite his efforts to goad Ryan into killing him.

After being absent for a few episodes, Joe is eventually seen again when Ryan comes to him looking for information regarding Joe's escaped former mentor, Arthur Stauss. Joe agrees to help Ryan should he visit him every day until Joe's impending execution. When Strauss's favourite student, Theo Noble, convinces a former member of the military to pose as a guard in Joe's prison, Noble and Joe speak via a microphone on the guard's person, and Theo can see Joe through a pair of sunglasses in the man's pocket. When the facility is made aware of the man's presence, Joe strangles and kills him, taking the glasses to make a weapon out of.

On the day of his execution, Joe kills two guards and keeps three people hostage, and demands that Ryan Hardy attend the execution, otherwise he will kill the hostages. When Ryan arrives, he has to handcuff his hands behind his back before entering the room. Ryan is then attacked by Joe using a stun gun. After coming around, Ryan gets Joe to release one hostage. Joe then gets Ryan to admit that the relationship between him and Joe is the most important in his life, after speaking of how Ryan killed the man who murdered Ryan's father.

After the remaining hostages are released, all the gates to the cells are opened by Penny, Theo's sister, who was trying to get Ryan killed. One inmate, who Joe had told earlier wasn't worthy of his soon to be empty cell, took Joe into the cell. After killing or incapacitating the inmates, Ryan saves Joe and they kill the remaining inmate. Joe is then executed as planned, as Ryan watches.

Ryan goes to a bar and drinks that night, ordering two shots every turn, as he imagines that he is drinking with Joe. Ryan's illusions of Joe continue, particularly as he over-steps the lines and tortures Penny.

Carroll's only published novel, The Gothic Sea, was inspired by Poe's The Light-House, but was a commercial and critical failure.

=== Claire Matthews ===
Portrayed by Natalie Zea. She is Joe Carroll's ex-wife, Joey's mother, and Ryan Hardy's former lover. Claire is a professor at the university where Joe worked before he went to prison. In 2002, she told Joe that she was pregnant with their son Joey. Claire told Ryan to speak to Joe when Ryan had a question about a murder case, not knowing Joe was the killer. Once Claire learned that Joe was a murderer, she divorced him and got custody of Joey. Claire made the first move when it came to her and Ryan. Claire meets Ryan's sister Jenny, who tells him that she likes her. Ryan later ends their relationship because he wants a better life for her and Joey.

After Carroll, whom Claire calls a madman, kidnaps their son, he sends men to kidnap her too. She is placed under protection, then Ryan takes her into hiding. She tells Ryan that Joe wrote her a letter. When the FBI informs Claire of Joe's second escape, she wants to talk only to Ryan. In the season 1 finale, Claire is injured by Molly, one of Joe's followers. In the beginning of Season 2, Mike states that she died of her injuries. However, in "Unmasked", it's revealed that she survived and has been in protective custody since then, to make sure Joe and his followers can't find her. After hearing of Joe's return, Claire wishes to help the authorities, leaving witness protection so she can see Ryan again. She reunites with Ryan and attempts to help him find and kill Joe. She escapes her custody to meet Joe after delivering a message to him but runs into Emma again. They engage in a struggle with Claire killing her, but she is captured by Luke and Mark. She is saved by Ryan and Joe, while Luke is killed and Mark gets away. After Joe is sent to jail, Claire breaks up with Ryan, believing she's the one who drags down their relationship.

=== Mike Weston ===
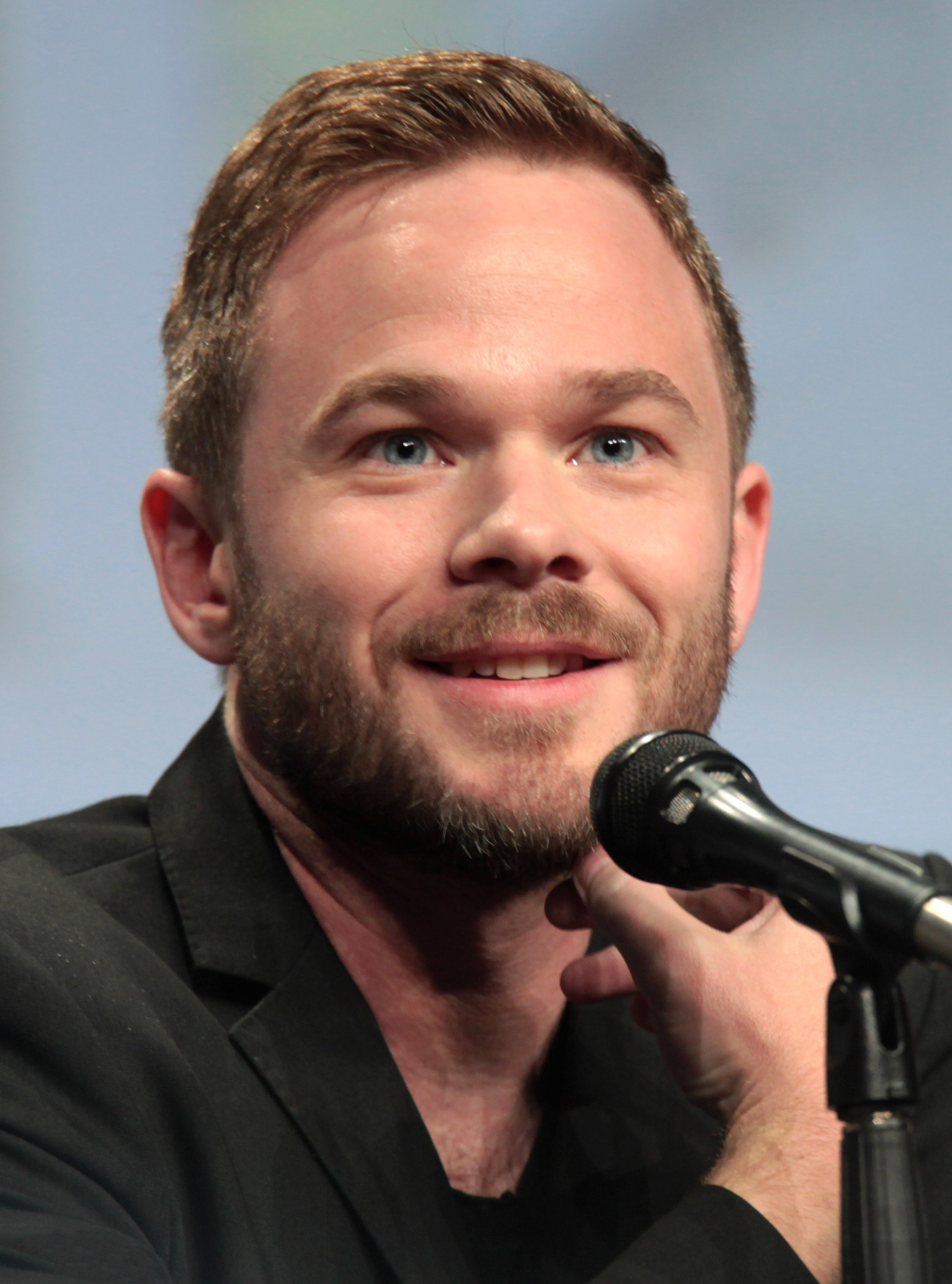
Shawn Ashmore portrays Mike Weston.

Portrayed by Shawn Ashmore. He is a young FBI agent. Weston wrote his thesis on Joe Carroll while in training and sees Ryan Hardy as a hero. He is considered the team's expert on Joe Carroll and displays a proficiency with computers. He is portrayed as Ryan's partner throughout most of season 1 and later in season 2 alongside Ryan's niece, Max Hardy, as the two develop feelings for one another. After Lily Gray kills his father, he swears revenge on her. Eventually he kills her, causing concern in Ryan and Max. In the season 2 finale, Mike goes to save Ryan from the twins Luke and Mark. Mike saves them as Max kills Luke. Afterwards, he and Max kiss, beginning their relationship.

At the beginning of season 3, it is discovered that Max and Mike are no longer together, and that Max is now dating fellow FBI employee, Tom Reyes. It is revealed in a flashback that they broke up when Mike went with other FBI agents to hunt down Mark Gray, the man who killed his father.

Mike and Max have sex behind Tom's back, but feeling guilty, Max immediately regrets it and tells Mike to leave. However, Max and Mike were both unaware that Daisy and Kyle Locke had set up cameras in Max's apartment. These cameras are what tip Mark off that the FBI have found his safehouse, and he flees. During the raid of the house, Tom finds the laptop and sees the incriminating footage. He then takes the laptop without reporting it.

When Mike and Ryan realise that Kyle and Daisy are targeting the daughter of the judge overseeing Arthur Strauss' trial, they go to save her, but during the process, Mike is knocked off the roof and hangs onto a rail. Tom finds Mike, and after a moment of hesitation, helps him out.

When Max, Mike and Ryan track down Daisy and Strauss, they are all ambushed by Mark. Max and Mike succeed in apprehending Strauss, but when Mike sees Mark running onto a boat, he leaves Strauss to Max and goes after Mark. Daisy then assaults Max and frees Strauss. Meanwhile, Mike corners Mark, and prepares to kill him, but Ryan stops him. As Mike and Ryan talk, Mark escapes. They then learn of Max's injuries.

Tom destroys the laptop after overhearing Max and Mike discussing how they've found out that the possessor is in the building. Tom then goes to his apartment, where the body of an FBI agent, who he inadvertently killed during a struggle over the laptop. However, he is ambushed by Daisy and Mark, who request that he bring Mike to them.

Tom lures Mike out with him by pretending to have a lead on the murdered agent. Here, Mike realises that Tom is handing him over the Mark. After he hands Mike over, he has acid thrown on his face and is shot and killed. However, before Mark can do anything to Mike, he is stopped by Theo Noble, who needs Mark as bait to get Ryan Hardy to trade his kidnapped sister, Penny for Mike. During the trade, Penny is killed and Mike is recovered safely.

After the separate questioning of Ryan, Max and Mike, Mike and Max embrace and decide to give their romance another go; however, Mark shows up and stabs Mike, but before he can harm Max, Mike shoots and kills him.

Mike recovers from his injuries around the time that Ryan and Theo scuffled and fell off a bridge, leading to both being presumed dead. Mike and Max then discover that Ryan's former girlfriend, Gwen, is pregnant with Ryan's child. They insist that Gwen won't be alone in bringing the child up. Unbeknownst to all three, Ryan was watching them from a safe distance, alive and well, ready to protect them while pretending to be dead.

=== Emma Hill ===
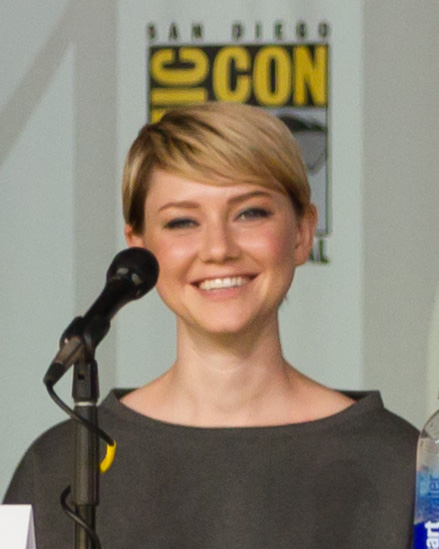
Valorie Curry portrays Emma Hill.

Portrayed by Valorie Curry. A follower of the cult, she first met Carroll at a book reading in 2003 and became one of his first and most devoted followers. At his direction, she assumes the name "Denise Harris" and gets a job as nanny for Carroll's son Joey. She assumes de facto leadership of the small cell tasked with abducting Joey and has no qualms about using violence to accomplish her goals. She is the girlfriend of Jacob Wells until she sees that Jacob wishes to leave Joe's cult; Emma then kills Jacob.

In the year following Joe's supposed death at the lighthouse, Emma lives with a handful of surviving followers. All but Emma are killed or taken in by the FBI while Emma is out meeting Mark. Emma goes with Mark and Luke to Lily Gray's home, where she reunites with Joe. The two remain together as they and Mandy leave Lily to go to the Korban cult compound. After they leave Korban, Joe receives a message that Claire is alive and asks Emma and Robert to find out if it is true. Eventually, Emma and Claire come face to face, resulting in Claire stabbing Emma and throwing her out of a second-story window. Emma makes one last attempt on Claire's life but fails and apparently dies from her stab wound.

=== Jennifer Mason ===
Portrayed by Jeananne Goossen. Agent Jennifer Mason is an FBI agent working with Ryan Hardy, Mike Weston and Troy Riley on the case of Joe Carroll's escape. She is no-nonsense, but has a clear love for her job. Mason only appeared in the Pilot. After Ryan Hardy broke three of Joe Carroll's fingers, she was sent back to Quantico. She was replaced by Debra Parker.

=== Debra Parker ===
Portrayed by Annie Parisse. She is an FBI specialist on cult behavior and head of the Bureau's Alternative Religion Unit. Her expertise leads to her being called in to head the investigation of Carroll and his cult. She grew up in a cult, fleeing, without the approval of her parents, when she was sexually abused by the cult's leader. Parker dies in the season finale after being buried alive by a couple of Carroll's cult members, who are subsequently killed by Hardy.

=== Paul Torres ===
Portrayed by Adan Canto, Paul Torres is one of Carroll's followers who assists in kidnapping Joey Matthews with Emma Hill and Jacob Matthews. Hailing from El Paso, Texas, Paul is a cyber security expert and a vicious serial killer who as an extreme dislike for kids. He is responsible for creating many of the fake id's and credentials the group uses. Paul becomes of Joe's trusted followers and is selected to take part is a covert plan to both kill Joe's last surviving victim Sarah Fuller and to later kidnap Carroll's son Joey. To achieve their goal, it is decided that Paul and Jaco pose as a gay couple living next door to her so that they can earn her trust. When the time comes, Paul and Jacob kidnap and deliver Sarah to Joe and later meet with Emma.

=== Jacob Wells ===
Portrayed by Nico Tortorella. He first appears as "Will Wilson". Jacob is Emma's lover and a Carroll follower. As "Will Wilson", he and Billy Thomas live next door to Sarah Fuller, the only woman who escaped Carroll. Will and Billy pose as a gay couple as part of their cult activities, using the ruse because they believe Sarah will not feel threatened by a gay couple. While Jacob is loyal to Joe, he later reveals that he never killed anyone, which causes friction with Emma and Paul. After Emma abandons him and Paul, Jacob begins to take after the other followers. However, after Jacob reveals to Emma that he doesn't want to die for Joe's cause, Emma kills him

Jacob was born to a successful doctor in Lake Whitehurst, Jacob didn't want to become one himself. He dropped out of medical school, and was persuaded to join Joe's cult. It was suggested in The Curse that he has a difficult relationship with his father.

Jacob is one of Joe's most long-term Followers, though unlike many of the others, he hadn't killed anyone when joining them. During meetings with the other Followers, he claimed to have killed a girl while he was in high school and dumped her body in the ocean. He told Joe the truth early, but Joe was okay with it and agreed to keep it secret, saying he would commit his first kill when he was ready. He met Emma when she visited Joe in prison and was set up on a blind date with him. He later witnessed her killing her mother and helped her get rid of the body.

Over time, he formed a bond with Paul, a recent new follower who eventually discovered of Jacob's inability to kill. He promised Jacob he wouldn't tell anyone on the condition he return the favor someday. They later were assigned to keep track on Sarah Fuller, Joe's last victim, and act gay for her to gain her trust. Unknowingly, Jacob was torn for his feelings with Emma and his friendship with Paul due to Paul seemingly gaining real feelings for him.

Living under the alias of Will Wilson and pretending to be the gay partner of "Billy Thomas," Jacob and Paul surveilled Sarah Fuller for over 3 years. Gaining her trust, they waited for Carroll's escape and delivered Fuller to him, so he could finish his "work." It has been suggested various times that due to the act that Jacob and Paul put on Jacob became bi-sexual since he has feelings for both Emma and Paul although he refuses to admit it.

Afterwards, Paul, Jacob and Emma kidnapped Carroll's son, Joey, under Carroll's commands. ("Pilot") At the house in the country where they are keeping Joey, he and his girlfriend, Emma show affection towards one another, much to the dismay and jealousy of Paul. The two share a room in the country house, and Paul walks in on them making love. ("Chapter Two")

Despite all of this Jacob tried to be the mediator between Emma and Paul since at first they did not get along. Jacob continues to try to control the problem when in a fit of rage and tired of being considered the third wheel Paul brings home a kidnapped girl known as Megan Leeds from a convenience store in The Poet's Fire

In (Mad Love) Paul eventually tells Jacob's secret which is the fact that Jacob lied about being a murderer to Emma Hill, only telling Joe Carroll and Paul about it. Emma responds by teaming up with Paul and trying to get Jacob to kill Megan Leeds as his first but he was unable to do so even when she was tied up. Later he lets her go only to have her be recaptured by Paul and Emma. Jacob later confronts Emma and Paul in the shower and tells him that he is sorry. They tell him they aren't giving up on him and hug him in the shower.

At the beginning of The Siege he wakes up in bed with Paul and Emma as a result of the shower scene from the previous episode. When he goes downstairs he catches Joey using the phone and pulls him away. He freaks out and later helps the search for Joey with Emma and Paul. Once they find him they meet Hank Flynn and begin to pack up the car; when they find Hank gone they split up and search for him.

Jacob is seen in the next episode The Fall which immediately follows the events of The Siege. Once he realizes they have Ryan Hardy, Joey Matthews and Megan Leeds trapped with the F.B.I. surrounding the place they begin to freak out whether they show it or not. Emma escapes the house with Joey leaving Jacob and Paul behind and in the confusion Ryan breaks free and stabs Paul. He rushes out of the house leaving Jacob and Paul for the F.B.I. Paul tells Jacob to escape but he refuses to leave Paul's side. Luckily for them Roderick who is the reason Emma escaped, sent two men disguised as SWAT into the house and got them both out safely. Jacob stopped a man's car; beat him up and threw him out and he then helps Paul into the car stating they will get him help. Paul thanks him for not leaving him to die and Jacob swears he will save him. As Emma parks the car for a moment she answers a call from Jacob who is crying; demanding to know why she left them; she tearfully hangs up the phone without a word.

Jacob and Paul are mentioned by Joey in the beginning of Let Me Go but not seen and at this time they are MIA. It is stated in Welcome Home that they are still missing but Joe thinks them to be safe as Emma has not seen anything on the news about their capture or deaths. This however was a lie, as Roderick pointed out Emma's phone is filled with messages from Jacob, but she has yet to listen to even one.

Jacob reappears at his parents' lake house near Arrowhead Lake, Pennsylvania and meets his mother, who shows fear towards her own son about the recent events he's done. She tries to reason with him that he's done a lot of bad things and wants to help him, but begs him to open to her. After she looks over Paul's condition, she mentions Paul will die unless he gets him to a hospital. After finding Joe's location, Jacob tries to get Paul to go with him, but Paul knows he has little time and begs Jacob to kill him so he can fulfill his promise to him. Despite Jacob's hesitance over killing his best friend, Paul believes in him and declares his love for Jacob as a tearful Jacob smothers Paul with a pillow as his first kill because Paul wanted his death to mean something. After Paul dies, Jacob lightly kisses him on the head and later reunites with Emma seeming to have a whole new outlook on things in Love Hurts.

His reunion with her becomes very sour, after reuniting with Joey and Joe he gives Emma the cold shoulder. Joe asks of him to give Emma a chance despite that what she did caused Paul to die, but reluctantly agrees. As they talk, she tries to tell him Roderick left her no choice and believes Jacob would have done the same, but he states he'd never do such a thing. Later that night, Emma tries to reason with him that she loves him, which leads them to almost have sex till Jacob keeps seeing images of Paul over him telling him to kill Emma and that she can't be trusted. After "killing" Paul, Jacob, now completely different from before, holds Emma in his arms telling her about what she did caused Paul to die and that he had to kill his best friend because of her. He grabs her neck and threatens her stating she should watch her back from now on. Currently, Jacob has no idea that Emma willingly slept with Joe.

In the episode "Whips & Regret," Jacob tells Emma that the Jacob she loves is dead and that he is a brand new man. Since then Jacob now acts much more aggressive and serious, going as far as to throw Claire to the ground stating that he's been ordered to put her in her place for Joe less she refuse. She says if she wants to see Joey, she'll have to "make an effort". She does so as she has dinner with Joe that night.

After the bunker is found, Joe takes Jacob and Vincent to Daniel Monroe's home and Jacob kills Brian Fowler and takes Debra Parker hostage. As she tries to talk with him about his life and why he's doing this, he refuses to listen even after how he has a golden life. Jacob uses her as leverage to force Ryan to let Joe go in the basement. Later at night, Jacob watches the news as he's on the TV about his choices in life leading him to call his father. His father begs him to tell him where he is, but Jacob hangs up and starts crying instead.

The next morning, he informs Joe about Ryan on the news about the deal he'll give one of Joe's followers if they turn themselves in. Joe tries to persuade them that they aren't in trouble and Ryan is desperate, but Jacob sees more to that. After Roderick kidnaps Joey, Jacob offers to find him with two others and stay outside Ryan's work place. They follow them to Roderick's base and kill him. After Ethan and Michael are killed, Jacob finds Joey and tells him to be quiet and tries to take him back to Joe. As they run, Joey begs him to stop stating his mom says he's one of the bad guys, but he says that's crazy. Ryan keeps him behind a shed and Jacob yells he has to take him back to Joe, but Ryan tells him Joe doesn't care about him or if he dies, causing Jacob to question everything he's doing. Ryan continues to persuade him to let Joey go which, with tears in his eyes, and Joey tearfully begging also, Jacob finally does the right thing and lets Joey go, but escapes in the process. At home, he is greeted by Emma, to which he begins to realize they are all going to die soon.

Jacob dies by his throat being slashed by Emma.

=== Sarah Fuller ===
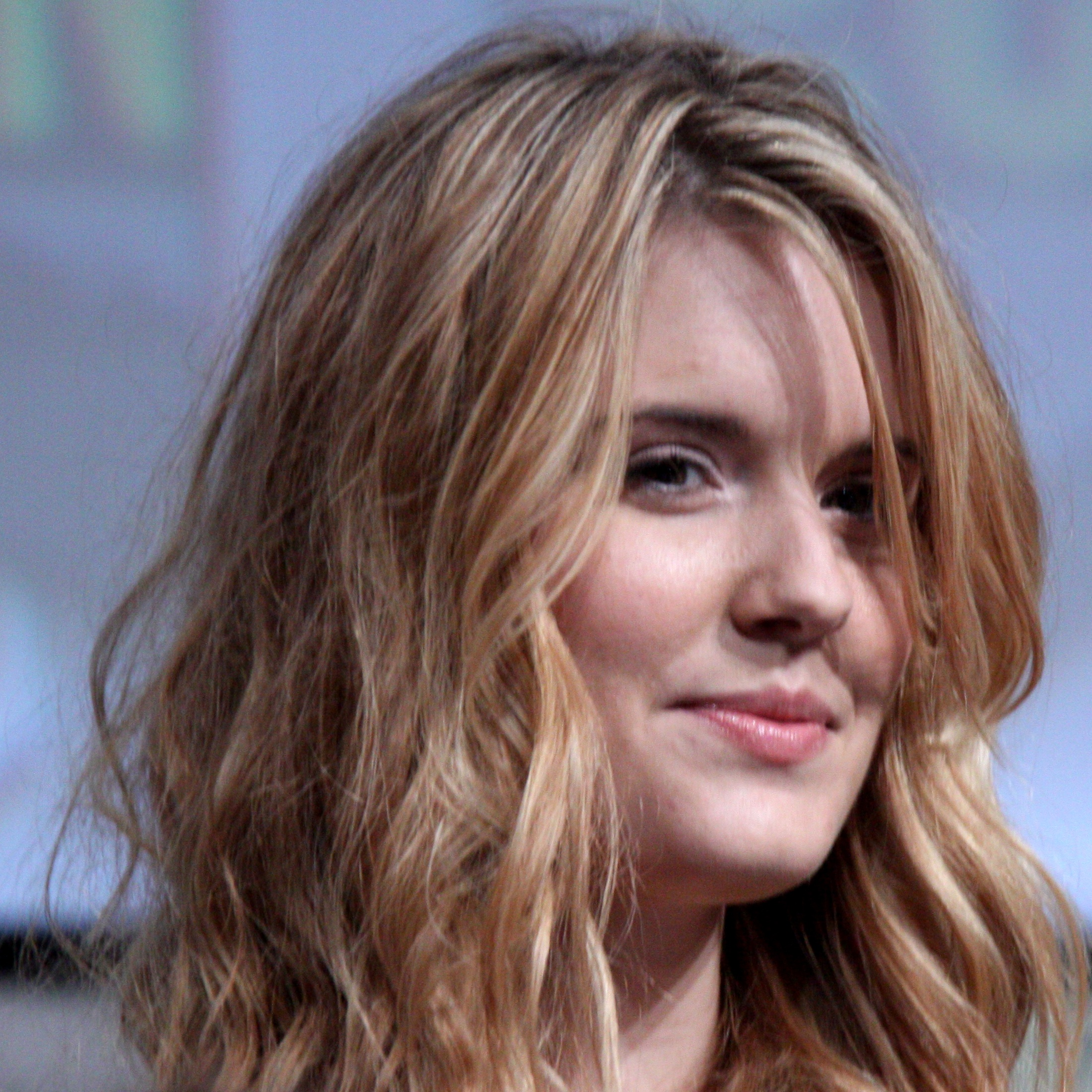
Maggie Grace portrays Sarah Fuller.

Portrayed by Maggie Grace. Dr. Sarah Fuller was the last victim of Joe Carroll before his capture. Working as a doctor, Sarah lived a normal life, the only thing to remind her of her past being the scars that remained. Her next door neighbors were a gay couple, their respective names being Billy Thomas and Will Wilson, or so they claimed. They were actually two of Carroll's followers, Paul and Jacob, and the time they spent as her neighbors was merely a ploy to gain her trust. When Carroll escaped from prison, they kidnapped her and brought her over to a property they owned, the Lighthouse Bed and Breakfast, so that he could finish his work.

=== Joey Matthews ===
Portrayed by Kyle Catlett. Joey is Carroll's son by his ex-wife, Claire Matthews. Emma tries to manipulate him by telling him that his father isn't really a bad person. He is abducted by Emma, Paul, and Jacob and taken to a farm house where he is told he's on an "adventure" and can't call his mother. Eventually, he realizes he's not on an adventure and attempts to call his mother but is stopped by Paul. Ryan Hardy finds his location, but Emma, through Roderick's orders, takes Joey away. He later meets his father for the first time and gives him the silent treatment, knowing what kind of person he is. After being reunited with his mother, Joey is taken hostage by Roderick but is saved by Ryan and Mike.

In season 2, Joey and his mother and grandmother have been put in witness protection so that Joe and his followers can't find them.

=== Max Hardy ===
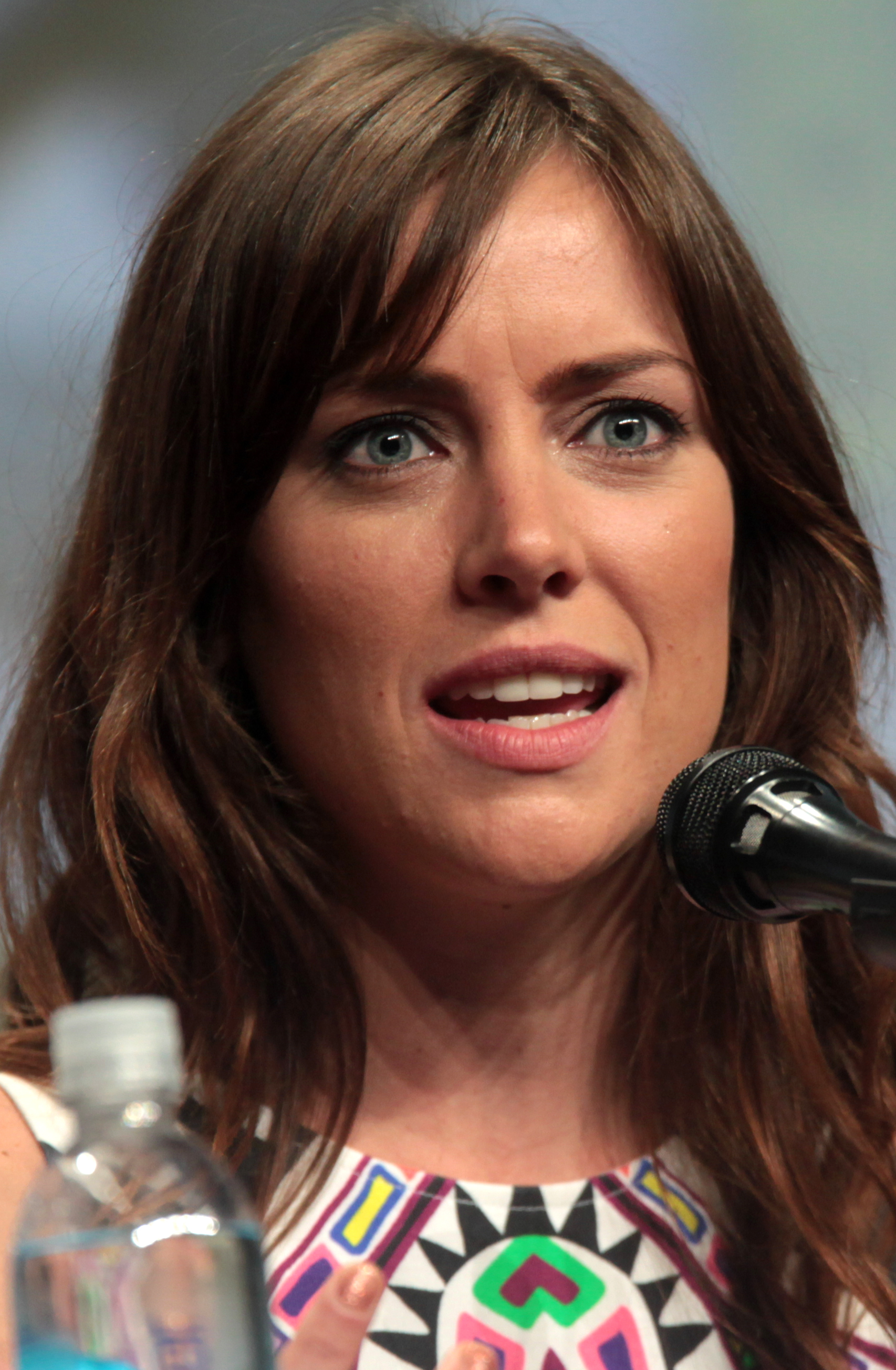
Jessica Stroup portrays Max Hardy.

Portrayed by Jessica Stroup. She is an NYPD detective and Ryan's niece, who helps her uncle with the investigation into Joe Carroll's supposed death. She is fiercely loyal to her uncle, which allows her to overlook some of his more violent policies. Early on, she provides technical support for Ryan and Mike. In season two, she is kidnapped by the "Huntsman", hired by Lily, in revenge for Mike beating Luke Gray nearly to death. She manages to escape, and she is saved by Mike and Ryan. In the beginning, she is very worried about Ryan's and Mike's aggressive behavior. She clashes initially with Mike, but the two slowly develop an attraction. By the end of season two, she has become more desensitized to Ryan and Mike's violence, and even helps cover up for Mike's murder of Lily. She kills Luke when he tries to kill Mike in the final showdown of season two. After Ryan has Joe arrested, she and Mike kiss.

In the season three opener, she has joined the FBI, and has dissolved whatever relationship she and Mike had. This is primarily due to Mike's obsession and inability to move on from Mark Gray, who is the only one left alive after being responsible for the death of Mike's father. She, along with Ryan and Mike, are targeted by Mark for the death of his family. Even though, she keeps the secret of Lily's murder within the inner circle, she is obviously bothered by the secrecy. She continues to be the conscious voice of reason between the three of them. This is exhibited when she stops the guys from torturing information out of a suspect. Any leeway she had previously afforded them in their violent tendencies has gone, and she is no longer willing to cover up the darkness. Max is hit especially hard when Mark and his friends kill the crew members of her deceased fathers fire company. The intense feelings lead her to temporarily reconnect with Mike, as she now understands his feelings about Lily better. She is beaten and critically injured by Daisy after being abandoned by Mike when they arrested Strauss. She later discusses details of the cover up with him, unaware of the fact that Tom is still watching her on the cameras set up by Kyle and Daisy. While recovering from her injuries, she ends up alone with Strauss' best student while investigating the infiltration into the FBI's servers. The police show up just as she is about to be stabbed by Sam (a.k.a. Theo/a.k.a. Terrance Jackson). She becomes extremely worried when Ryan suffers from post-traumatic stress syndrome and starts drinking again after his altercation with Carroll. She finds out that Tom has betrayed the bureau, but only after he kidnaps Mike and hands him over to Mark, Daisy, and Theo. She punches Ryan when she finds out that he knew that Mike was taken, but he loops her in. She and Ryan save Mike. After their debriefing, Mike declares his love for her, and she and Mike kiss in the parking garage. She invites him over, but just as she is about to leave, Mark comes up behind Mike and stabs him multiple times. She tries to get out of the car to stop him, but he pulls her out and attempts to stab her as well. Mike shoots him just in time. Max is able to kill Daisy when they rescue Gina from Theo. Max returns the declaration of love to Mike while he is recovering in the hospital. Max saves Ryan from Theo and Eliza. When Ryan's body can't be found, she tells Mike, then breaks down as the two cry together. Max and Mike promise to help Gwen raise her baby, and Max's cousin.

=== Lily Gray ===
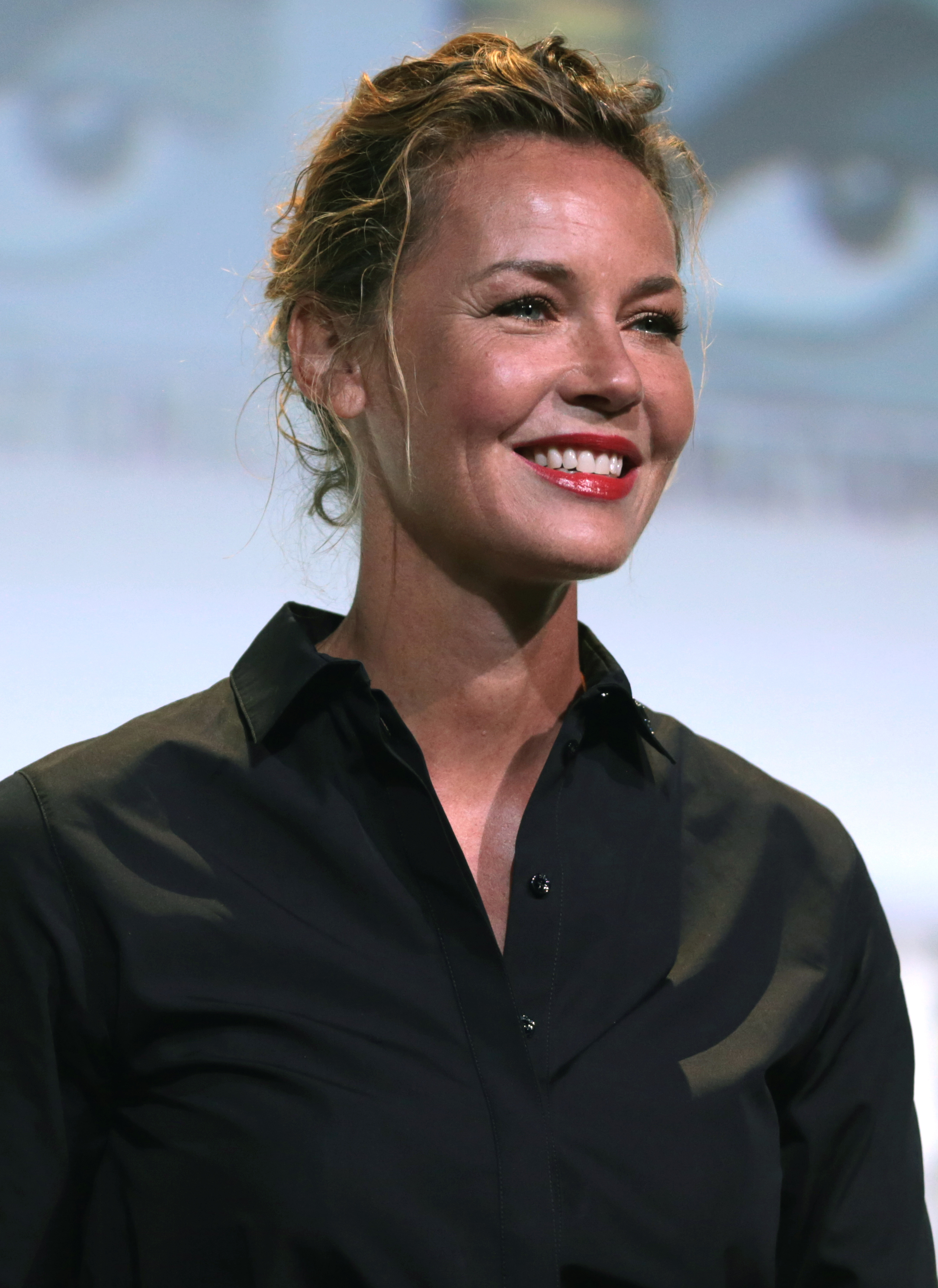
Connie Nielsen portrays Lily Gray.

Portrayed by Connie Nielsen. A wealthy socialite, she is initially successful at pretending to be the sole surviving victim of the subway attack and begins developing a close friendship with Ryan Hardy. Hardy eventually realizes that Gray is the leader of a killer cult similar to Carroll's. She escapes to the countryside with her sons, identical twins Luke and Mark, whom she unofficially adopted under mysterious circumstances. Having spent years seeking a man who will love her for who she is (i.e. a man who is, like herself, an insane killer), she attempts to have Joe as a part of her life and in a relationship, but he betrays her and expresses her contempt for her. After believing Luke to have died, Lily swears revenge on Ryan and Mike, kidnapping Max and attempting to kill her and murder Mike's father. After discovering Luke's survival, Lily hires assassins to save him and kill anyone in their way, and her son reunites with her and Mark. After they find Joe's location, Lily hires assassins to kill the Korban members and to bring Joe to her so she can kill him. She is found by Mike Weston, who shoots and kills her, avenging his father's death despite Ryan and Max's efforts to persuade him not to.

=== Mandy Lang ===
Portrayed by Tiffany Boone. She lives with Carroll for a year when he stays with her mother Judy, a groupie who communicated with Carroll in prison. Mandy regards Carroll as the father figure she never had and stabs her mother, who has become suspicious of Carroll, to death, in order to flee with Carroll. However, like Jacob, Mandy is hesitant to murder in Joe's name. After listening to Joe and Emma talk about how they view Mandy as weak and a lost cause, Mandy leaves Joe's cult. She later goes to Lily and her sons' location, intent on living with them. However, Lily has her sons torture Mandy for Joe's location. They kill her after she refuses to reveal this information.

=== Luke and Mark Gray ===
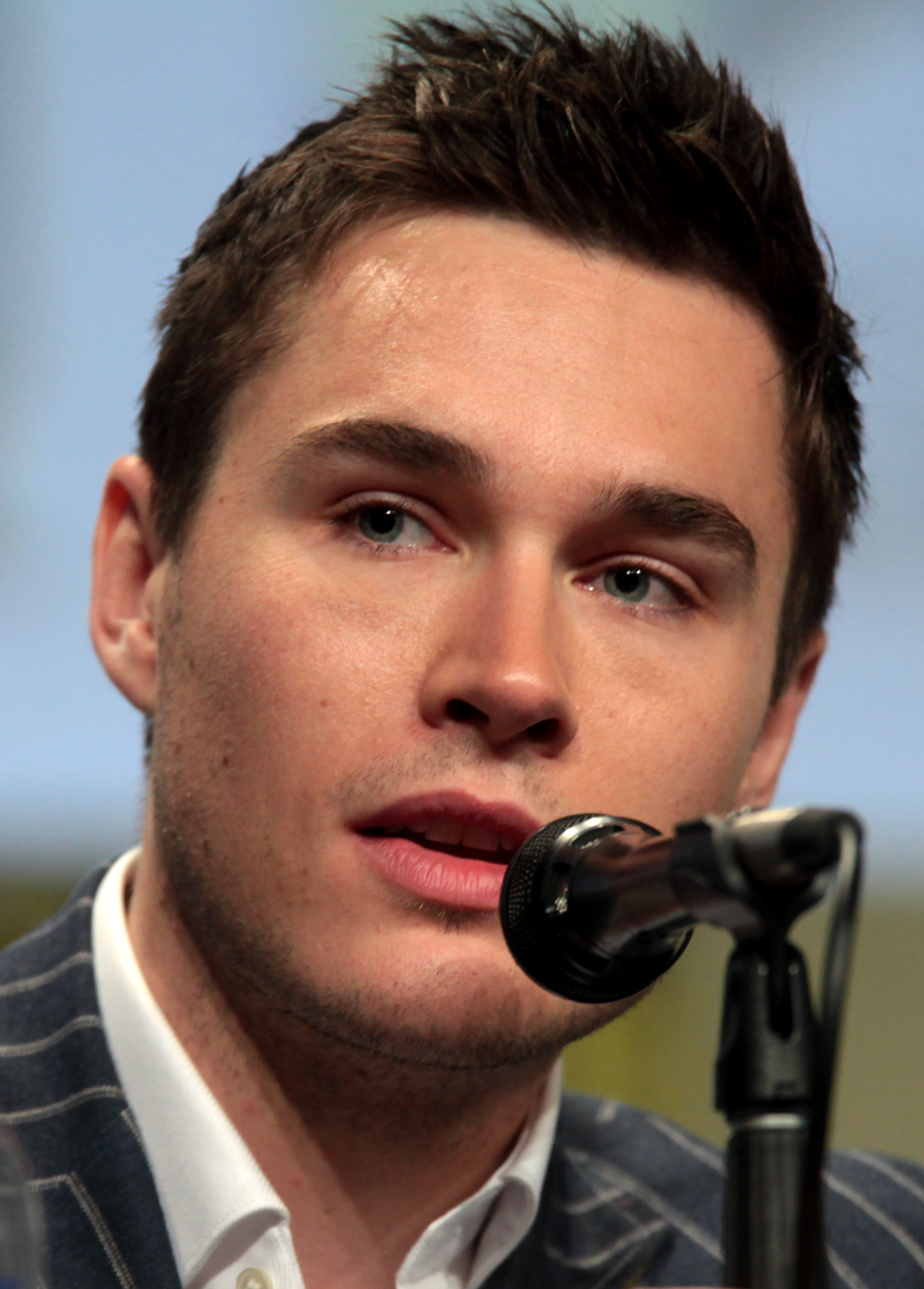
Sam Underwood portrays Luke and Mark.

Both portrayed by Sam Underwood. Identical twins, they are the unofficially adopted sons of wealthy deviant Lily Gray. They are the most prominent members of Lily's cult and those whom she seems to care for most. Along with Gisele and Carlos, they carry out the subway murders which occur a year after Carroll's supposed death. Luke is later apprehended by the FBI, while Mark is left to roam along with his mother, both of whom believe Luke to be dead. However, they discover his location and free him. After their mother is killed, they swear vengeance, capturing Claire Matthews. In the season 2 finale, Luke and Mark capture Ryan and Joe and attempt to kill Claire, but Mike and Max save them. When the twins find out that Mike killed their mother, Luke attempts to kill him but is shot to death by Max. Mark escapes with his brother's dead body to an unknown location.

Luke, the elder twin, is more outgoing than Mark, the younger. Luke is the leader, obsessed with death, revenge, and hints at being necrophiliac. He is also more psychotic than Mark. Mark is quieter and more practical but can be just as ruthless. He has a form of Haphephobia, which is revealed when Emma attempts to touch him before he allows her to. Luke is attracted to Gisele. Despite their differences, the twins deeply care for one another.

In season 3, Mark enlists the help of a young married couple, Kyle and Daisy Locke, to take part in a series of murders, manipulating the crime scenes to shadow the deaths of his mother, twin and sister. Mark swears revenge on the FBI, particularly Ryan Hardy, Max Hardy and Mike Weston for the killings of his sister, twin and mother. He shows signs of schizophrenia, having conversations to himself as Luke and himself. He kills FBI agent Jeff Clarke, who he had recorded on video admitting to allowing a black ops mission to take down Arthur Strauss, among others.

After going off the radar, Mark followed Max and Mike to a garage, where he stabbed Mike but was killed by Mike before he could harm Max. Mike recovered from his wounds.

== Recurring characters ==
- Marshal Scott Turner: Portrayed by John Lafayette. He is an FBI agent assisting in finding Carroll and his cult. In season 2, he is assigned to watch over Claire Matthews and her family in witness protection.

Season 1

- Troy Riley: Portrayed by Billy Brown. He is an agent with the Federal Bureau of Investigation. Riley was one of the FBI agents working the Joe Carroll case with Ryan Hardy. Maggie Kester stabs Riley to death after she is revealed to be another follower of the cult.
- Jordy Raines: Portrayed by Steve Monroe. He is a security guard revealed to be a member of Carroll's cult. Once captured, he reveals more information than he intended and commits suicide in shame.
- Deirdre Mitchell: Portrayed by Chinasa Ogbuagu. She is an FBI agent working with Hardy, Parker and Weston, mainly tracking and uncovering information about the cult on the computer.
- Rick Kester: Portrayed by Michael Drayer. He is Maggie Kester's husband and one of Joe Carroll's followers. He is first seen attacking Ryan in Emma's old house. He later sets Stan Fellows, a literary critic who negatively reviewed Carroll's book, on fire by pouring gasoline on him. He helps Maggie trick the FBI into protecting her although her cover is blown when Jordy Raines gives her up by mistake. Rick helps her escape after she kills Troy Riley, but he is shot twice, fatally, by Ryan.
- Molly: Portrayed by Jennifer Ferrin. Ryan's old girlfriend, she is revealed to be a follower of Carroll. She stabs Ryan and Claire at Ryan's apartment, but Ryan kills her.
- Olivia Warren: Portrayed by Renée Elise Goldsberry. She reluctantly serves as Carroll's lawyer, and is forced to send messages out at Carroll's request. He kills her after she helps him escape from federal custody.

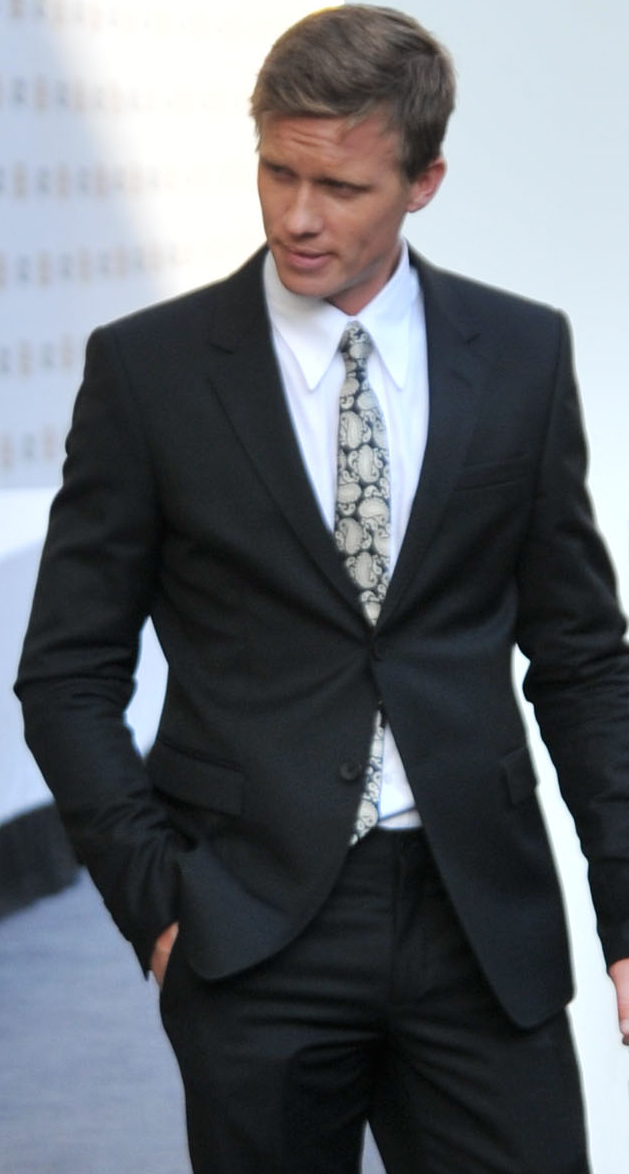
Warren Kole portrays Roderick.

- Roderick: Portrayed by Warren Kole. Carroll's second-in-command, he helps gather the cult followers together. After running away with Joey, he is killed by another cult member.
- Megan Leeds: Portrayed by Li Jun Li. She works at a convenience store near where Paul, Emma, and Jacob are holding Joey. Paul starts chatting her up looking for wine. After her shift, as they are making out, she tells Paul she doesn't want to have sex. But Paul does and keeps trying. She tries to get him to take her home, but he beats her against the car, knocking her out. He brings her back to the farmhouse, where Emma demands that Megan be killed. Eventually, Megan convinces Jacob to let her go and runs out of the house but is caught and stabbed by Emma. Paul and Emma tie her up and lock her in the basement. Ryan finds Megan, and she begs to be let go. She is used as a bargaining chip to keep the FBI and Ryan under control once they invade the house Joey Matthews is being kept at. Megan is later set free.
- Charlie Mead: Portrayed by Tom Lipinski. He is a follower of Carroll put in charge of keeping tabs on Carroll's ex-wife and Ryan's former lover, Claire. After failing Joe twice, Charlie allows Joe to kill him in penance.
- Louise Sinclair: Portrayed by Annika Boras. One of Joe Carroll's followers. She helps him in his second escape from police custody by killing a bystander. She assists Roderick in kidnapping Mike Weston to get Claire's location. She assists Amanda Porter's murderous campaign of killing women named Claire Matthews. As the final Claire Matthews is in police custody, Sinclair shoots a police officer from behind to let Porter kill the last Claire Matthews. Ryan Hardy arrives and shoots Sinclair dead. He rescues the hostage and takes Porter into custody.
- Nick Donovan: Portrayed by Mike Colter. He is an FBI agent in charge of the investigation of Joe Carroll and his cult following his second escape. Donovan appears in a press conference berating the current task force for letting Joe escape for a second time. He expresses disdain towards Ryan and calls him a "wild card". Later, a cult follower comes forward to take advantage of Ryan's offer to release any followers in exchange for information. However, as they turn their backs, Melissa takes out her hair needles and stabs Donovan in his right eye, attacking him from behind.

Season 2

- Agent Gina Mendez: Portrayed by Valerie Cruz. She is put in charge of the FBI investigation that begins after the subway murders on the new/remaining cult members. She was in a past relationship with Jana Murphy, and the couple became the parents of two children; unknown to Gina, Jana was one of Joe's followers who used their relationship to help Joe. After Mendez discovered this, Jana stabs her but kills herself after Ryan and Mike catch her. Mendez survives and apologizes to Ryan. Mendez decides to leave the FBI after finding Theo Noble's wife dead, and children in a critical condition, stating that more people are being hurt than saved. In an attempt to lure Ryan out, Noble kidnaps Mendez, her new wife, and their children with Daisy Locke's help. Mendez's wife is non-fatally stabbed and her family escape.
- Judy: Portrayed by Carrie Preston. A nonviolent groupie who wrote to Carroll while he was in prison. She lodges him after he goes into hiding after being "confirmed" dead. She believes she can "fix" him. However, a year after taking him in, she becomes increasingly suspicious and wary of Carroll, who no longer needs her help. Judy's daughter, Mandy, who has found in Carroll the father she never had, stabs her mother to death and flees with her newfound father figure.
- Gisele: Portrayed by Camille De Pazzis. She is a follower of Lily Gray who, along with Luke and Mark, are responsible for the subway murders a year after Carroll's supposed death. She is Luke's girlfriend and is killed by Ryan after lying about killing Max.
- Carrie Cooke: Portrayed by Sprague Grayden. A tabloid reporter who wrote a book of Joe Carroll. She's old friend of Ryan. She will continue to want to uncover the secrets of Joe Carroll's sect.
- Hopkins: Portrayed by Kyle Barisich. He is an FBI information and computer specialist and works with Agent Mendez, Mike Weston, and Agent Lawrence at the FBI's main headquarters for the Lily Gray case.
- Agent Lawrence: Portrayed by Montego Glover. She is an FBI information and computer specialist and works with Agent Mendez, Mike Weston, and Hopkins at the FBI's main headquarters for the Lily Gray case.
- Sami: Portrayed by Bambadjan Bamba. He and his twin Jamel are a part of Lily Gray's illegitimate family. He is killed by Ryan.
- Radmilla: Portrayed by Rita Markova. She is Lily Gray's illegitimate daughter. She is killed by Joe.
- Robert: Portrayed by Shane McRae. A Korban cult member initially involved with Micah and Julia. He assists Joe taking over Korban after killing Micah and Julia. After finding Claire, Robert is betrayed by Emma and killed.
- Micah: Portrayed by Jake Weber. Is the leader of the Korban cult. After Joe manipulates him into killing his wife, Micah is poisoned by Joe after watching Joe's broadcast to the world.
- Julia: Portrayed by Jacinda Barrett. Micah's wife and second-in-command of Korban. She is killed by Joe after she becomes unfaithful to her husband.

Season 3

- Daisy Locke Portrayed by Ruth Kearney. A female serial killer student of Strauss and Kyle's wife. She is shot and killed by Max after working with Theo to kill Gina Mendez and her family.
- Tom Reyes Portrayed by Gbenga Akinnagbe. An FBI Agent and Max's boyfriend. He keeps a bugged laptop to spy on Max and after being blackmailed is shot and killed by Daisy Locke.
- Erin Sloan Portrayed by Monique Gabriela Curnen. An FBI Agent tech analyst. Erin is close friends with Mike and Max. She is accidentally killed by Tom when she attempts to arrest him, thinking he was a mole.
- Penny Tyler Portrayed by Megalyn Echikunwoke. The younger sister of Theo Noble. Like her brother, she is a sadistic serial killer. She is killed by Ryan, who shoots her when she attempts to escape.
- Kyle Locke Portrayed by Hunter Parrish. The serial killer husband of Daisy. He is killed by Ryan.
- Juliana Barnes Portrayed by Anna Wood. Strauss's goes between who reached out his ex-students to free him from jail. She is killed by Mark Gray after he found out the truth of what was really going on.
- Cindy Noble Portrayed by Susan Kelechi Watson. Theo's devoted wife who knows nothing of his serial killer lifestyle or of his sister's existence. Theo kills her and drugs their children to protect himself.
- Eliza Portrayed by Annet Mahendru. Another one of Strauss's students, Eliza works for an unknown organization with humongous power.
- Lisa Campbell Portrayed by Diane Neal. An FBI agent being blackmailed by Eliza to work as her mole. In the series finale, it is heavily implied that she is murdered by Ryan for her betrayal.

== Guest stars ==
Season 1

- Aimee portrayed by Meredith Hagner
- Sharon Cooper portrayed by Kate Hodge
- Chief Burke portrayed by Albert Jones
- Officer Ava Marsden portrayed by Lisa Joyce
- Maggie Kester portrayed by Virginia Kull
- Jenny Hardy portrayed by Susan Misner
- David Hicks portrayed by Arian Moayed: one of Carroll's followers who is shot in the leg and tortured by Ryan Hardy after helping Carroll escape. He commits suicide in an Interrogation Cell with a suicide pill concealed under the skin of his hand.
- Brock Wickford portrayed by Tom Pelphrey
- Warden Gene Montero portrayed by Nestor Serrano
- DeeDee portrayed by Amy Hargreaves
- Vicky Gray portrayed by Joanna Rhinehart
- Bo portrayed by Jacinto Riddick: responsible for kidnapping the daughter of the warden of the jail where Joe was being held. After meeting with Emma and Charlie, he is killed by Charlie.
- Detective Warren portrayed by Michael Roark
- Black Claire Matthews portrayed by Jasmine Carmichael
- Hank Flynn portrayed by Josh Segarra
- Betty Vincent portrayed by Mandy Seigfried
- Alex portrayed by Charlie Semine
- Mrs. Welles portrayed by Jayne Atkinson: the mother of Jacob Welles.
- Aaron portrayed by Kal Parekh
- Amanda Porter portrayed by Marin Ireland: One of Joe Carroll's followers, she and another follower, Louise Sinclair, begin killing women named Claire Matthews (the same name as Joe's ex-wife) to draw Ryan Hardy out. When Porter takes the last Claire Matthews hostage in a face-off with Ryan, she tells him that he needs a lesson for sleeping with Joe's wife. When Porter moves to shoot Hardy, he tackles her and frees the hostage. Porter is taken into custody.
- Kate portrayed by Afton Williamson
- Tyson portrayed by David Zayas
- Dalton portrayed by Michael Pemberton
- Phil Gray, portrayed by Kelly AuCoin
- Daniel Monroe portrayed by Robert Bogue
- Marshall Ferguson portrayed by Tom Degnan
- Vincent McKinley portrayed by Christopher Denham
- Dana Montero portrayed by Audrey Esparza
- Neil Meyer portrayed by Jack Gwaltney

Season 2

- Agent Phillips portrayed by James McDaniel
- Melissa Evans portrayed by Tehmina Sunny
- Barry portrayed by Keith Carradine
- Carlos portrayed by J. D. Williams
- Hannah portrayed by Susan Heyward
- Reverend Glenn portrayed by C. J. Wilson
- David portrayed by James McCaffrey
- Jana portrayed by Leslie Bibb
- Jamel portrayed by Hugues Faustin
- Bella portrayed by Wendy Hoopes
- Wendy Porter portrayed by Lexie Tompkins
- Kurt Bolen portrayed by Lee Tergesen
- FBI Director Tom Franklin portrayed by Charles S. Dutton
- Eric portrayed by Waymon Arnette
- Cole portrayed by Owen Campbell
- Billy Boyer portrayed by Aaron Lazar
- Lance portrayed by David Call
- Mallory portrayed by Emily Kinney
- Patrick portrayed by Theo Stockman
- Carla portrayed by Kristina Klebe
- (Young) Joe Carroll portrayed by Pico Alexander
- Decklan portrayed by Tom Patrick Stephens
- Serena portrayed by Florence Faivre
- Jason portrayed by Connor Fox
- Courtney portrayed by Kaija Matiss
- Roman portrayed by Ezra Knight

Season 3

- Chairman Billings portrayed by Gibson Frazier
- Natalie Brooks portrayed by Kayla Mae Maloney
- Mrs. Miller portrayed by Saundra Santiago
- Dawn McClane portrayed by Kristen Bush
- Anna Clarke portrayed by Joy Osmanski
- Louise portrayed by April Hernandez-Castillo
- Warren portrayed by Paul Fitzgerald
- Charles portrayed by Gerry Bamman
- Paula portrayed by Hina Abdullah
- Wyatt portrayed by Jayce Bartok
- Marisol portrayed by Hannah Marks
- Reggie portrayed by Max Carver
- Sheila portrayed by Michael Michele
- Judge Wallace portrayed by Robin Weigert
- Nathan portrayed by Cotter Smith
- Sheriff Windsor portrayed by Michael Gaston
- Justin Windsor portrayed by Eric Nielsen
- Pat portrayed by Tobías Segal
- Hillary portrayed by Allison Mack
- Michelle Leeks portrayed by Elia Monte-Brown
- Corey portrayed by Chris Beetem
- Gillian portrayed by Pepper Binkley
- Tucker portrayed by David Furr
- Luis portrayed by Manny Montana
- Kent portrayed by Conor Romero
- Nancy portrayed by Julie Ann Emery
- Eldon portrayed by David Pittu
- Dr. York portrayed by Randy Kovitz
- Dr. Ann York portrayed by Jessica Blank
- Malcolm Tower portrayed by Stephen Schnetzer
- Detective Alvarez portrayed by Alfredo Narciso
- Dana portrayed by Mouzam Makkar
- Gary portrayed by Evan Hall
- Captain Robert Tubbs portrayed by Bill Dawes
- Jewel portrayed by Alex McKenna
- Oleg portrayed by Robert Sedgwick
- Lonnie portrayed by James McMenamin
- Agent Hammond portrayed by Korey Jackson
- Agent Royce portrayed by Quincy Dunn-Baker
