= A Vigilante =

- Theatrical release poster
- Directed by: Sarah Daggar-Nickson
- Written by: Sarah Daggar-Nickson
- Produced by: Allison Rose Carter; Ambyr Childers; Andrew Corkin; Lars Knudsen; Randall Emmett; Olivia Wilde
- Starring: Olivia Wilde; Morgan Spector; Kyle Catlett; Tonye Patano; Chuck Cooper; Betsy Aidem; Judy Marte; C.J. Wilson
- Cinematography: Alan McIntyre Smith
- Edited by: Ben Baudhuin; Matthew C. Hart
- Music by: Danny Bensi; Saunder Jurrians
- Production companies: MoviePass Films; Emmett/Furla/Oasis Films; Pulse Films; Uncorked Productions; FilmScience
- Distributed by: Saban Films
- Release dates: March 10, 2018 (SXSW); March 29, 2019 (United States)
- Running time: 91 minutes
- Country: United States
- Language: English
- Box office: $83,012

A Vigilante is a 2018 American crime drama film written and directed by Sarah Daggar-Nickson in her feature directorial debut. Starring Olivia Wilde, Morgan Spector, Kyle Catlett, C.J. Wilson, Tonye Patano, Chuck Cooper, Betsy Aidem and Judy Marte, the film follows Sadie (Wilde), a woman who makes it her life's mission to help victims of domestic violence break free from their abusers.

A Vigilante premiered at South by Southwest on March 10, 2018, and was theatrically released in the United States on March 29, 2019. The film received critical acclaim, with particular praise for Wilde's performance.

== Plot ==
Sadie works as a vigilante, helping women and children escape abusive homes and family members. She struggles with money, asking for whatever the people she helps can give and attempting to redeem a life insurance policy on her still-missing husband. She lives out of a motel room, the wall of which is posted with a map she has been using to search for him.

After Sadie works out and disguises herself with latex makeup, contacts and a wig, she is invited to the home of Andrea and Michael Shaund, claiming that she needs to conduct a health insurance assessment. Sadie overpowers Michael with her martial arts skills, forces him to transfer the deed to his home and most of his money to his wife, then tells him to leave and never go near his wife or her family again, promising to kill him if he does. Before leaving, Sadie tells Andrea to pass on her contact number to anyone she feels needs it.

Sadie then helps a young woman escape from her abusive partner, then later beats up three men who try to assault her outside a bar, and rescues a young boy and his infant brother from their drug-addicted mother, who had been keeping the infant locked away in squalor. She tells the boy that police and social services will arrive soon. When the boy asks her to look after them, she says she cannot as they would not be safe with her, but she leaves him her phone number in case he needs her help.

In a flashback, Sadie finally opens up to her therapy group about her past; revealing that her husband, a brutal and manic survivalist, tried to force her and their young son, Cody, to move out of their home and live off the grid together. When she tried to escape with Cody, he chased them both with a knife, stabbed Sadie repeatedly, and ended up killing Cody in a fit of rage. After Cody's murder, Sadie entered a shelter for domestic violence survivors where she found a book on Krav Maga which sparked her interest. She later went back to her former home where she found a sketch that Cody drew with the letter "C" prominently displayed. She left a note for her group therapy leader, telling her that she is available to help other women in trouble.

Sadie is stalked by her sadistic husband, who sneaks into her motel room, strikes her from behind and knocks her unconscious. She wakes up bound to a chair in a mountain cabin, her husband taunting her and welcoming her back home. He tears up and burns Cody's drawing and leaves her restrained to go hunt for food, but she cuts her bonds. When he returns, Sadie tries to stab him, but he knocks the blade aside and breaks her arm. Sadie escapes and, after a chase, the two finally confront each other. She tells her husband that he killed their son because he couldn't stand to have someone see him for the monster he really is. Sadie kills him and dumps his body on a road.

Sadie visits her attorney, who tells her the police found her husband's body but no evidence of the murderer. Due to his felon status, they don't seem willing to look further into the case, and with his body found, her life insurance claim will be processed. Sadie leaves to help a woman who has contacted her for help.

== Cast ==
- Olivia Wilde as Sadie
- Morgan Spector as Sadie's Husband
- Tonye Patano as Beverly
- Judy Marte as Straight Up Shelter Woman
- Betsy Aidem as Andrea Shaund
- C.J. Wilson as Michael Shaund
- Chuck Cooper as Lawyer
- Kyle Catlett as Zach
- Estefania Tejeda as Counseling Group Woman #1
- Olivia Gilliat as Margaret Turner
- Cheryse Dyllan as Charlene Jackson
- Margot Bingham as Joyce Richards

== Production ==
In November 2016, it was announced Olivia Wilde had been cast in the film, with Sarah Daggar-Nickson directing from a screenplay she wrote. Randall Emmett, George Furla, Andrew D. Corkin, Lars Knudsen and Ambyr Childers served as producers on the film, under their Badlands Entertainment, The Long Run, Uncorkd Productions, Emmett/Furla/Oasis Films and Parts & Labor banners, respectively.

== Release ==
The film had its world premiere at South by Southwest on March 10, 2018. Shortly after, Saban Films had acquired U.S. distribution rights to the film. It was released on March 29, 2019.

== Reception ==
A Vigilante received positive reviews from film critics. It holds a 90% approval rating on review aggregator website Rotten Tomatoes, based on 39 reviews, with an average of 6.9/10. The website's critical consensus reads, "Led by Olivia Wilde's fearless performance and elevated by timely themes, A Vigilante is an uncompromising thriller that hits as hard as its protagonist." On Metacritic, the film holds a rating of 68 out of 100, based on 12 critics, indicating "generally favorable" reviews.
