= I Am Radar =

I am Radar
- Author: Reif Larsen
- Language: English
- Genre: Fiction
- Publisher: Penguin Press
- Publication date: 2015
- Publication place: United States
- Media type: Print (hardcover)
- Pages: 650 pp (first edition)
- ISBN: 978-1-59420-616-0

I am Radar is Reif Larsen's second novel, first published in 2015. The novel traces the life of Radar Radmanovic, a child born with charcoal-black skin. Like Larsen's debut, the book is an example of ergodic literature, including diagrams and footnotes within the text. The novel received mixed reviews.
