= The Selected Works of T. S. Spivet =

Adventure novel by Reif Larsen

The Selected Works of T.S. Spivet
- Front cover
- Author: Reif Larsen
- Language: English
- Genre: Fiction, Adventure, Novel
- Publisher: Penguin Press
- Publication date: 2009
- Publication place: United States
- Media type: Print (hardcover)
- Pages: 352 pp (first edition)
- ISBN: 978-1-59420-217-9
- OCLC: 276819213
- Dewey Decimal: 813/.6 22
- LC Class: PS3612.A773 S46 2009

The Selected Works of T.S. Spivet is the debut novel by American author Reif Larsen, first published in 2009. The book follows the exploits of a 12-year-old mapmaker named T.S. Spivet, who lives on a ranch near Divide, Montana, as he receives a prestigious award and accepts it, hitch-hiking on a freight train for the acceptance speech in Washington D.C.. The book is noteworthy for its unique design; the plot-line is illustrated with images which further the narrative by providing charts, lists, sketches, and maps accompanying each page, mirroring T.S.'s cartographic interests and his minute attention to detail.

Vanity Fair claims Larsen received just under a million dollars as an advance from Penguin Press following a bidding war between ten publishing houses.

== Plot summary ==
The novel is told from the perspective of twelve-year-old T.S. Spivet, a mapmaking enthusiast living on a ranch near Divide, Montana, a small village near Butte, Montana, practically on the continental divide. T.S.'s mother, whom he consistently refers to as "Dr. Clair," is an entomologist preoccupied — or so it seems — with the search for a possibly nonexistent species of insect, the "tiger monk beetle". His father, an equally emotionally detached rancher with no understanding for the world of scientific investigation, solely judges — or so it seems — T.S. for his nonexistent cowboy abilities. T.S.'s younger brother, Layton, who followed his father's cowboy lifestyle and interests, was killed in a joint brotherly experiment that involved the scientific investigation of gun shooting. His elder sister, Gracie, is in her teenage years, prone to "awful girl pop" and violent mood swings. T.S.'s love for scientific research leads to a friendship with his mother's partner, who unbeknownst to the Spivets has sent several of T.S.'s works into various magazines and societies. One day, T.S. receives a call from a man at the Smithsonian Institution who, believing T.S. to be an adult scientist, informs him that he has won the prestigious Baird Award and is invited to give a talk at the Institution's ceremonies. Without telling his family, T.S. decides to run away from home to attend the event, which he will travel to by freighthopping. T.S. tricks a Union Pacific freight train into pausing at Divide and hides himself in a Winnebago that is being shipped on a flat car. He settles down for a lengthy journey, mapping the trip and imagining the Winnebago to be a conversational companion along the way.

The middle section of the novel consists largely of text from one of his mother's notebooks, which he took with him on impulse. In a surprise departure from Dr. Claire's scientific fixations, the notebook is a semi-fictional account of a Spivet ancestor who was herself a great researcher and cartographer. This reveals a side to his mother T.S. had not been aware of, and a mystery begins to form as he rides the rails.

== Format ==
An oversized book (9.3 by 7.8 inches, about 24 by 20 cm), the margins of each page have been expanded to include drawings, charts, and lists accompanying the written elements. These drawings are purported to be done by T.S. himself, who also provides each with an explanatory caption that deepens the book's narrative. This is designed to mimic T.S.'s own habit of quantifying the world around him using cartography. Larsen has stated that this technique was not originally intended to be included in the book's format, finishing a complete first draft of the work before he "discovered the margins as a playground of T.S.’s mind." Larsen's parents were both visual artists (his mother a painter and photographer, his father a printmaker), which he credits as contributing to his decision to include maps and drawings instead of the traditional footnote style that had been planned. The majority of the drawings for the book were originally sketched by Larsen himself, subsequently passing them along to artist friend Ben Gibson, who stylistically finished them.

Although almost two-thirds of the book's pages are accompanied with a drawing or figure, many completed illustrations were left out of the book due to spatial limitations and the creation of mood departures or jarring interruptions to the storyline flow. Many of the omitted illustrations can be found on the book's website, along with an unpublished epilogue explaining some of the book's mysteries.

== Critical reception ==
Some critics have praised the work for its originality, including a feature in Vanity Fair declaring the work to be "like nothing you’ve ever picked up". The book received an especially encouraging review from prolific writer Stephen King, saying: "Here is a book that does the impossible: it combines Mark Twain, Thomas Pynchon, and Little Miss Sunshine. Good novels entertain; great ones come as a gift to the readers who are lucky enough to find them. This book is a treasure."

Some critics, however, cited a significant deceleration in the novel's storyline, pointing out errors made by the first-time writer toward the work's conclusion. One such critic wrote: "I can't remember the last time my initial affection for a novel was so betrayed by its conclusion. It's maddening that somebody didn't help this young author polish 'The Selected Works of T.S. Spivet' into the genre-breaking classic it could have been." While most reviewers praised the illustrative style of the book's layout, some considered it to be excessive; a reviewer for The New York Times described the act of reading both the main text and the accompanying drawings "exhausting."

== Film adaptation ==
The novel was adapted into a 2013 film entitled The Young and Prodigious T.S. Spivet by director Jean-Pierre Jeunet.
