= Kyle Catlett =

American actor (born 2002)

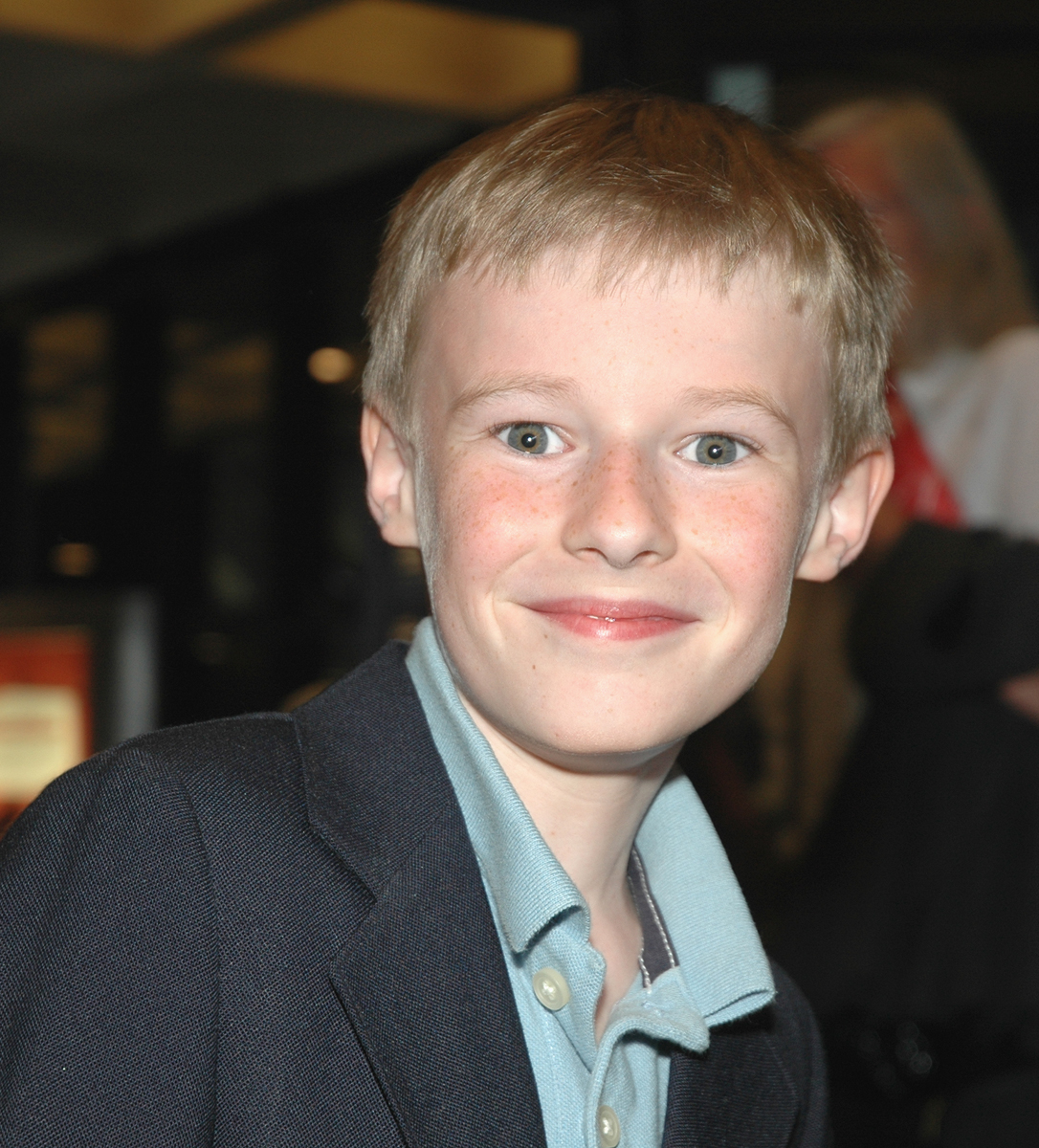
- Catlett at Munich Filmfestival 2014 during a press conference for The Young and Prodigious T.S. Spivet
- Born: November 16, 2002 (age 23); Morristown, New Jersey, U.S.
- Years active: 2013-2018

Kyle Catlett (born November 16, 2002) is an American former child actor from Morristown, New Jersey.

Catlett has appeared in the television series The Following as "Joey Matthews". He made his feature film acting debut in a 2013 adventure drama film The Young and Prodigious T.S. Spivet, he played the eponymous lead role, directed by Jean-Pierre Jeunet. He starred in the remake Poltergeist (2015), as the middle child, Griffin Bowen.

== Personal life ==
Besides English, he speaks Russian, Chinese, French, some Spanish and some Latin. He was taught Russian by his mother. He learned Chinese in Chinese school once a week, and gave an interview in that language. He studied French since the film crew of The Young and Prodigious T.S. Spivet was mainly French.

== Filmography ==
=== Films ===
| Year | Title | Role | Notes |
|---|---|---|---|
| 2013 | The Young and Prodigious T.S. Spivet | T.S. Spivet | |
| 2015 | Poltergeist | Griffin Bowen | |
| 2018 | A Vigilante | Zach | |

=== Television ===
| Year | Title | Role | Notes |
|---|---|---|---|
| 2009 | Mercy | Henry Morton | Episode: "The Last Thing I Said Was" |
| 2011 | Unforgettable | Max Seiferth | Episode: "Heroes" |
| 2013 | The Following | Joey Matthews | 15 episodes |
| 2016 | The Tick | Young Arthur | Recurring role |
