= Adan Canto =

Mexican actor (1981–2024)

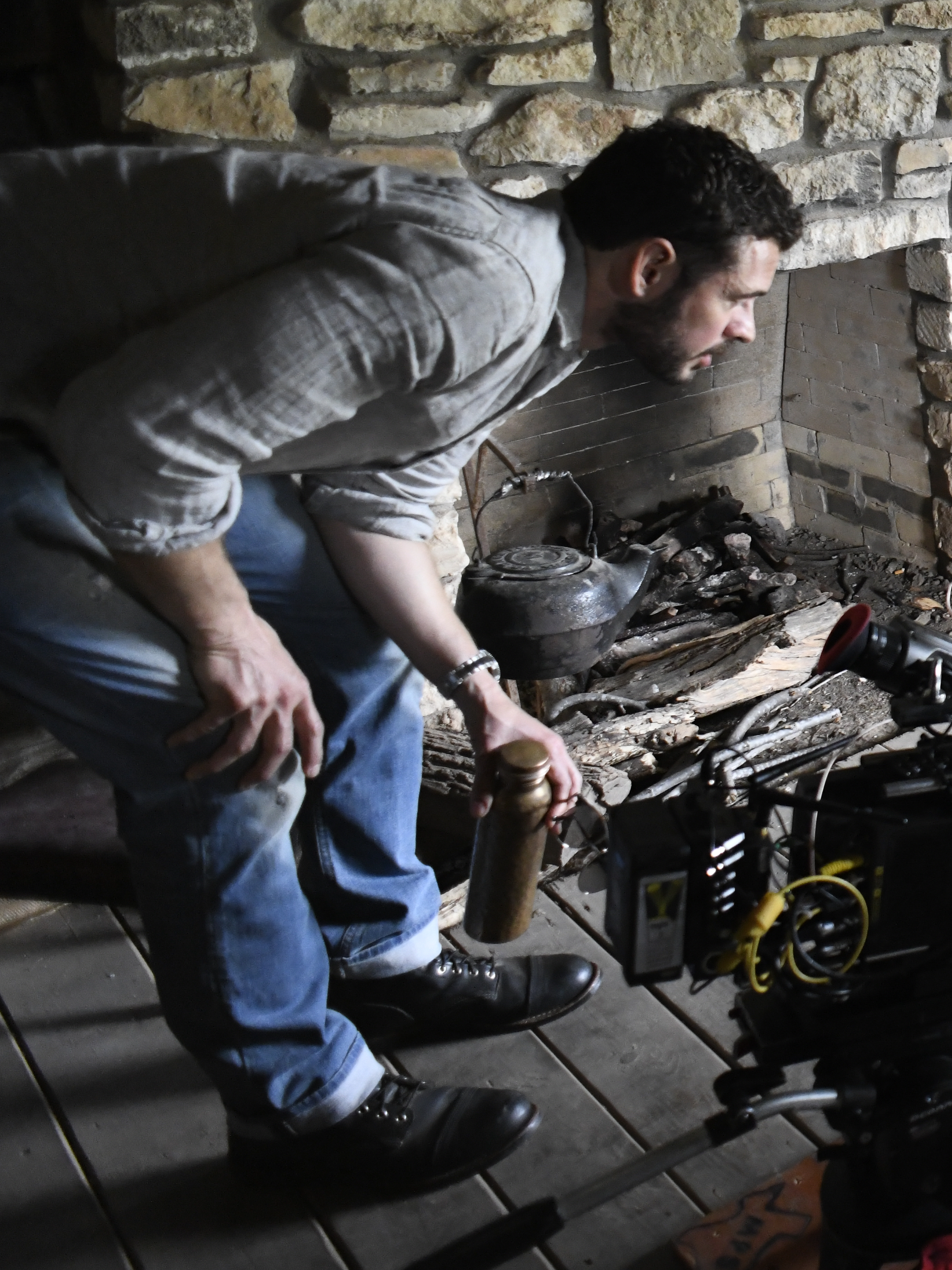
- Adan Canto on the set of The Shot in Dripping Springs, Texas in 2019
- Born: 5 December 1981; Ciudad Acuña, Coahuila, Mexico
- Died: 8 January 2024 (aged 42); Los Angeles, California, U.S.
- Resting place: Forest Lawn Memorial Park, Los Angeles, California, U.S.
- Occupation: Actor
- Years active: 2009–2024
- Spouse: Stephanie Lindquist (m. 2017)
- Children: 2

Adan Canto (5 December 1981 – 8 January 2024) was a Mexican actor. He portrayed Sunspot in the 2014 superhero film X-Men: Days of Future Past, Paul Torres on the Fox drama series The Following, and A.J. Menendez in the ABC prime-time series Blood & Oil. He appeared as Rodrigo Lara Bonilla in the Netflix drama series Narcos, Aaron Shore in the ABC/Netflix political drama Designated Survivor, and starred on Fox's The Cleaning Lady until his death.

Canto wrote and directed his first short film Before Tomorrow in 2014. His short film The Shot earned several festival awards for Best Narrative Short Film in 2020.

== Early life ==
Canto was born in Ciudad Acuña, Coahuila, on 5 December 1981. He crossed the border daily as a child to attend an American Catholic school in Del Rio, Texas. He grew up riding horses at his grandfather's ranch in Acuña where his father was a charro. With the encouragement of his mother, Canto began performing on stage as a singer at the age of 7. He was introduced to the traditional boleros and mariachi music from a young age and performed in and around his home state through his teenage years.

Canto left home at the age of 16 to pursue a career as a musician. He had success as a singer/songwriter in San Antonio after collaborating with Studio M. He spent five years working as a musician in Mexico City where he performed as lead singer for the jazz band Del Canto. Canto wrote for and produced several songs for film and TV in Mexico. He began acting in a handful of commercials in Mexico City and was soon cast in a television series called Estado de Gracia. Canto eventually turned to the stage after being cast as a lead in the adaptation of Pedro Almodóvar's All About My Mother.

== Career ==
In 2013, Canto made his debut on American television, playing the role of Paul Torres on the Fox drama series, The Following during its first season. He later was cast as Sunspot in the 2014 superhero film X-Men: Days of Future Past. Also in 2014, Canto was regular cast member on the ABC comedy series, Mixology. He later co-starred in the Amazon pilot Hysteria, and NBC's The Curse of the Fuentes Women. In 2015, Canto was cast as A.J. Menendez in ABC prime time series, Blood & Oil. He later had a recurring role on the Fox drama series, Second Chance, and guest-starred on ShondaLand's The Catch.

In 2016, Canto was cast in the ABC political drama series Designated Survivor, playing White House Deputy Chief of Staff and later Chief of Staff Aaron Shore opposite Kiefer Sutherland, Natascha McElhone, and Maggie Q. The show was renewed by Netflix for a third season which was released on 7 June 2019.

In 2019, Canto was cast opposite Halle Berry in her highly anticipated directorial debut film Bruised.

Canto started his production company Canto House Pictures in 2013 and directed his first short film Before Tomorrow the following year. His most recent short film The Shot, a period drama set in 1844 Texas, earned several festival awards for Best Narrative Short Film in 2020. Canto was developing projects for film and TV through his production company based in Los Angeles, California at the time of his death.

In March 2020, Canto was cast in a main role of mobster Arman Morales for the Fox series The Cleaning Lady, which he starred in for two seasons. His declining health prevented him from immediately rejoining the cast for the show's third season, although, at the time of his death, he had planned to eventually return to the show. The show's third season was dedicated to Canto with a tribute card in the third-season premiere.

== Personal life ==
Canto met American actress Stephanie Lindquist in 2012 while filming The Following in Brooklyn, New York. Their first artistic collaboration was the short film Before Tomorrow in 2014. The two married in June 2017 and lived in the Hollywood Hills. They had a son in 2020 and a daughter in 2022.

Canto died of appendiceal cancer on 8 January 2024 at age 42. He was buried at Forest Lawn Memorial Park, Hollywood, California.

== Filmography ==
=== Film ===
Year	Title	Role	Notes
2010	Te Presento a Laura	Manuel	
2010	Sin Memoria	Coco	
2011	Amar no es querer	Mauro	
2012	Al Ras	Adan	Short film
2014	Before Tomorrow	Joseph	Short film; also director, writer, and producer
2014	X-Men: Days of Future Past	Sunspot	
2014	Almost Thirty	Sid	
2017	Amanda & Jack Go Glamping	Nate	
2020	2 Hearts	Jorge Bolivar	
2020	Bruised	Desi	
2020	The Shot	—N/a	Director, writer, and producer
2021	The Devil Below	Darren	
2022	Agent Game	CIA Operative Kavinsky	

=== Television ===
Year	Title	Role	Notes
2009	Estado de Gracia	Leon	
2010	Los Minondo		Episode: "El enfrentamiento"
2013	The Following	Paul Torres	10 episodes
2014	Mixology	Dominic	13 episodes
2014	Hysteria	Matt Sanchez	Episode: "Pilot"
2015	Narcos	Minister Rodrigo Lara Bonilla	Episode: "The Men of Always"
2015	Blood & Oil	A.J. Menendez	9 episodes
2016	Second Chance	Connor Graff	5 episodes
2016	The Catch	Jeffery Bloom	Episode: "The Real Killer"
2016–2019	Designated Survivor	Aaron Shore / Aarón Rivera	Main role; 53 episodes
2022–2024	The Cleaning Lady	Arman Morales	Main role (seasons 1–2); 22 episodes
