= Reif Larsen =

American author

- Born: 1980 (age 45–46); Cambridge, Massachusetts, U.S.
- Education: Milton Academy; Brown University; Columbia University
- Occupation: Author
- Writing career
- Genre: Fiction
- Notable work: The Selected Works of T.S. Spivet

Reif Larsen (born 1980) is an American author, known for The Selected Works of T.S. Spivet, for which Vanity Fair claimed Larsen received just under a million dollars as an advance from Penguin Press following a bidding war between ten publishing houses.

== Life ==
Larsen was born in Cambridge, Massachusetts. Both his parents were artists. He graduated from Milton Academy in 1998 and then went on to Brown University and Columbia University. He holds an M.F.A in fiction. He has also made films in the United States, the United Kingdom and the sub-Saharan desert. He currently is living in New York.

== Works ==
Larsen's debut novel, The Selected Works of T.S. Spivet, was adapted into a 2013 film entitled The Young and Prodigious T. S. Spivet by director Jean-Pierre Jeunet. His second novel, I Am Radar, appeared in 2015. Like Larsen's debut, the book is an example of ergodic literature, including diagrams and footnotes within the text. He has also authored two children's books.

== Style ==
Larsen has cited Mark Danielewski, W.G. Sebald and Gabriel García Márquez as influences. Larsen's work incorporates illustrations, diagrams, and footnotes within the text.

== Bibliography ==
- The Selected Works of T.S. Spivet (2009)
- I Am Radar (2015)
- The Path (children's book, 2021)
- Una Wimple Charts Her House (children's book, 2021)
