= The Young and Prodigious T. S. Spivet =

2013 adventure-drama film

- Theatrical release poster
- Directed by: Jean-Pierre Jeunet
- Screenplay by: Jean-Pierre Jeunet; Guillaume Laurant
- Based on: The Selected Works of T. S. Spivet by Reif Larsen
- Produced by: Frédéric Brillion; Gilles Legrand; Jean-Pierre Jeunet
- Starring: Helena Bonham Carter; Judy Davis; Callum Keith Rennie; Kyle Catlett; Niamh Wilson; Jakob Davies; Rick Mercer; Dominique Pinon
- Cinematography: Thomas Hardmeier
- Edited by: Hervé Schneid
- Music by: Denis Sanacore
- Production companies: Cross Creek Pictures; Epithète Films; Filmarto; France 2 Cinéma; Gaumont; Orange Cinéma Séries; Tapioca Films
- Distributed by: Gaumont (France); Les Films Séville (Canada)
- Release dates: 28 September 2013 (DSSIFF); 16 October 2013 (France); 31 July 2015 (US)
- Running time: 105 minutes
- Countries: France; Canada
- Language: English
- Budget: €26.8 million; (US$30 million)
- Box office: $9.5 million

The Young and Prodigious T. S. Spivet is a 2013 adventure drama film directed by Jean-Pierre Jeunet and co-written with Guillaume Laurant, an adaptation of the 2009 book The Selected Works of T. S. Spivet written by Reif Larsen. The film stars Helena Bonham Carter, Judy Davis, Callum Keith Rennie, and Kyle Catlett.

10-year-old budding scientist T.S. Spivet secretly crosses the country, from his family's Montana ranch where he lives with his cowboy father and scientist mother, aboard a freight train to receive an award from the Smithsonian Institution in D.C..

The film failed to recover its costs, so is considered a box office bomb.

== Plot ==
Ten-year-old T. S. Spivet lives on a Montana ranch with his sister, his mother, an entomologist, and his father, a cowboy. T. S. spends his time inventing and exploring the ranch with the family dog, Tapioca, while his fraternal twin brother, Layton, was more inclined toward cowboy culture. While playing in a barn, Layton died in an accident.

The Smithsonian Institution in Washington contacts T.S. to announce that he has won the Baird Award for his perpetual motion machine. Museum director Ms. Jibsen assumes he is an adult. Initially reluctant, T.S. decides he must run away to receive the prize. Before leaving, he looks at Layton's old bedroom, a shrine of dusty toys and furniture that no one feels able to throw away. T.S. sneaks out early to begin his journey.

Initially, T.S. travels by train, hopping on a rail car, where he plays and imagines that Layton is still with him. After nearly being caught by a guard, he opts to sleep in an auction show camper. T.S. only leaves it at night in search of food, where he meets the hobo "Two Clouds". He tells him a story of a sparrow and a pine tree, suggesting that everybody reaches their right destination eventually. T.S. contemplates calling his family, but cannot bring himself to do it.

The next day, as T.S. is walking along the railroad tracks a policeman begins chasing and swearing at him, so he is forced to climb atop a canal gate. Realizing he may have gone too far, the policeman guides the boy to climb back to safety, but once T.S. is safe, he resumes chasing him.

T.S. eventually loses him, then hitchhikes with friendly trucker Rick, who enjoys meeting people and chronicling this in photography. T.S. realizes, after inquiring about a photo of him in military garb pointing a machine gun at an Arab's head, that he was a soldier post-9/11. Rick tries to downplay this with dark humour. Allowing T.S. to sleep on the truck, he notices that the boy is injured from nearly falling off the bridge earlier that day, so suggests he see a doctor.

After Rick leaves him in Washington, T.S. meets Ms. Jibsen at the Smithsonian. Skeptical the boy could possibly have invented the motion machine, T.S. proves her wrong by describing his scientific process. He fibs, saying he is an orphan, fearing that his parents will appear and be angry if they discover where he is.

Ms. Jibsen, basking in T.S.'s spotlight, insists on being his new guardian and accompanying him to the conference where the Baird Award is being awarded. She often speaks over him, like most adults tend to do, which annoys him. He sits at a table alone during the conference, but a crowd of admirers suddenly swarm him when they realise he is the boy behind the prizewinning invention.

T.S. gives a speech, revealing Layton had accidentally shot himself in the barn, bringing his audience to tears. He sobs that nobody ever talks about Layton, as if his brother never existed. Unbeknownst to him, his mother watches from a balcony, having driven to Washington to find him. When T.S. later appears on a sensationalist talk show, the host Roy introduces a surprise guest - T.S.'s mother. This angers Ms. Jibsen, as she realizes she cannot be in charge of T.S. anymore.

After a tense reunion, T.S. hugs his mother, but as they leave together, Roy and Ms. Jibsen chase after them. Ms. Jibsen, having gotten drunk, swears at T.S. and calls him a "mother lover" which causes Mrs. Spivet to slap her. T.S.'s father appears and punches out Roy for trying to stop his son from leaving. T.S. apologizes for hurting his father's feelings, who just smiles at him, giving him a piggyback ride, and letting him wear his favorite cowboy hat.

Back at home, T.S.'s mother gives birth to a new baby. So, T.S. invents an even better perpetual motion machine, which they use to rock his new infant sibling's cradle on the front porch.

== Cast ==
- Helena Bonham Carter as Dr. Clair Spivet, mother
- Judy Davis as G. H. Jibsen
- Callum Keith Rennie as Tecumseh Elijah Spivet, father
- Kyle Catlett as T. S. Spivet (Tecumseh Sparrow Spivet), son
- Niamh Wilson as Gracie Spivet
- Jakob Davies as Layton Spivet
- Rick Mercer as Roy
- Dominique Pinon as Two Clouds
- Julian Richings as Ricky
- Richard Jutras as Mr. Stenpock
- Sylvia Stewart as Reception Guest

== Production ==
After writing and directing Micmacs, Jeunet preferred his next film to be based on an existing story. Before Larsen's book was published, he had shortlisted several of his favourite directors to make a film based on the book, and was contacted by Jeunet. Filming was done from June to October 2012, mainly in Quebec and Alberta, Canada, with some scenes in Washington, D.C., and Chicago. The Franco-Canadian production was Jeunet's first 3D film. Also, a track from the videogame Mass Effect 3 called "Leaving Earth" was used during TS's speech at the institute.

== Release ==
Rights for the 2015 U.S. release were sold to Harvey Weinstein. Weinstein had requested cuts to the film which the director refused to make. Jeunet claims that the release was hobbled by Weinstein, and as a result, the film did not do as well as it should have.

== Reception ==
=== Box office ===
In France, the film was released on 16 October 2013. It collects 676,900 entries during its theatrical run. The film was released in the United States on 31 July 2015. In total, the film accumulated just over $7.6 million in worldwide box office, including approximately $5.6 million in France and approximately $100,000 in the United States, against a budget of €26,8 million ($30 million).

=== Critical response ===
The Young and Prodigious T. S. Spivet received generally positive reviews from critics. The film holds a 78% approval rating on Rotten Tomatoes, based on 50 reviews with an average rating of 6.1/10. The site's critical consensus reads "The Young and Prodigious T .S. Spivet brings its bestselling source material beautifully to life, offering a blend of visual thrills and poignant pathos that help tie the film together despite an occasional surfeit of quirk." On Metacritic, the film holds a score of 53 out of 100, based on 11 reviews, indicating "mixed or average reviews".

== Awards ==
At the 39th César Awards, the film won the award for Best Cinematography.

== Home media ==
The Young and Prodigious T. S. Spivet was released on DVD and Blu-ray on 4 June 2014 in France, and on 3 November 2015 in the United States. It was also released on Blu-ray in Hong Kong in 2015. Only the French and Hong Kong Blu-ray releases contain the 3D viewing option.
