= Devious Maids season 2 =

Devious Maids
- Season 2
- Promotional poster for the second season of Devious Maids
- Starring: Ana Ortiz; Dania Ramirez; Roselyn Sánchez; Judy Reyes; Edy Ganem; Rebecca Wisocky; Tom Irwin; Grant Show; Drew Van Acker; Susan Lucci; Mark Deklin; Joanna P. Adler; Dominic Adams; Colin Woodell
- No. of episodes: 13

Release
- Original network: Lifetime
- Original release: April 20 – July 13, 2014

Season chronology
- ← Previous; Season 1 Next → Season 3

The second season of the American television comedy-drama series Devious Maids began airing on Lifetime on April 20, 2014. The season consists of 13 episodes.

== Plot ==
The second season premiered on April 20, 2014. The season centers on the mystery story of Opal, the new, 40-something maid, played by Joanna P. Adler. The character is described as "reminiscent of Mrs. Danvers from Hitchcock's Rebecca" and is seen as a threat to Marisol's new relationship with Nicholas. The second season also deals with Rosie working for an African-American family that is scheming to do harm to an elderly man she's hired to act as a caregiver, Zoila dealing with her estrangement from her husband Pablo while her daughter Valentina tries to distance herself from Remi and Zoila while trying to downplay the attention of pool boy Ethan, both of whom, along with a new body guard, Tony, are hired by Adrian and Evelyn Powell in the wake of a series of robberies that leads to deadly consequences for Alejandro, who is killed during their heist at his party, leaving Carmen, who signed a deal to insure a recording deal in order to keep his homosexuality a secret, back to square one in her quest to become famous.

== Casting ==
For the second season, four new series regular actors were added for the show. Brianna Brown, Wolé Parks and Brett Cullen did not return for season 2. Mariana Klaveno went from regular to recurring basis in second season. Stage actress Joanna P. Adler was cast in main role of a new mystery maid, Opal, in December 2013. Newcomer Dominic Adams was cast as Tony, the bodyguard. Tricia O'Kelley joined the cast in the recurring role as Tanya. Colin Woodell was cast as his son, Ethan Sinclair, and Mark Deklin as Nicholas Deering, Marisol's new love interest.

This season, Klaveno, Brown, Cullen and Parks left as show regular performers. Klaveno, Cedeño and Hamilton returned as recurring status. Academy Award–nominee June Squibb also was cast as Susan Lucci's character's mother, Velma, in two episodes of the second season. Also was added the African-American Family - the Millers, Tiffany Hines as Didi, Kimberly Hebert Gregory as Lucinda, Reggie Austin as Reggie, and Willie C. Carpenter as Kenneth Miller.

== Cast ==
=== Main ===
- Ana Ortiz as Marisol Suarez/Deering
- Dania Ramirez as Rosie Falta
- Roselyn Sánchez as Carmen Luna
- Judy Reyes as Zoila Diaz
- Edy Ganem as Valentina Diaz
- Rebecca Wisocky as Evelyn Powell
- Tom Irwin as Adrian Powell
- Grant Show as Spencer Westmore
- Drew Van Acker as Remi Delatour
- Susan Lucci as Genevieve Delatour
- Mark Deklin as Nicholas Deering
- Joanna P. Adler as Opal Sinclair
- Dominic Adams as Tony Bishara / Amir Hassan
- Colin Woodell as Ethan Sinclair

=== Recurring ===
- Reggie Austin as Reggie Miller
- Willie C. Carpenter as Kenneth Miller
- Gideon Glick as Ty McKay
- Octavio Westwood as Miguel Falta
- Tiffany Hines as Didi Miller
- Ivan Hernandez as Javier Mendoza
- Kimberly Hebert Gregory as Lucinda Miller
- Alex Fernandez as Pablo Diaz
- Susie Abromeit as Dahlia Deering
- Matt Cedeño as Alejandro Rubio
- Melinda Page Hamilton as Odessa Burakov
- Tricia O'Kelley as Tanya Taseltof

=== Guest ===
- Mariana Klaveno as Peri Westmore
- June Squibb as Velma Mudge
- Deke Anderson as Rick Dresden
- Michael Feinstein as himself
- E. Roger Mitchell as Detective Figueroa
- Brianna Brown as Taylor Stappord
- Sean Flynn as Jason

== Episodes ==
No. overall	No. in season	Title	Directed by	Written by	Original release date	US viewers (millions)
14	1	"An Ideal Husband"	Eva Longoria	Marc Cherry	April 20, 2014	1.96
In the three months that has passed since solving Flora's murder, Marisol has fallen for a new man, but his maid Opal seems intent on ending the relationship; Genevieve plays mediator when she learns that Valentina has come back home from Africa but wants to keep her distance from Zoila and Remi and ends up landing a new job with the Powells, whose return from a vacation is greeted with a robbery that results in Adrian and Evelyn hiring a bodyguard, not knowing that their stolen property is being played out in "Robin Hood" fashion as it is distributed to the poor on the streets; Peri's attempt to keep Rosie off Spence's mind is thrown for an even bigger loop when she learns that Rosie is still in the country, after reporting her to the U.S. Immigration and Customs Enforcement, leading Peri to divide the two even further by plotting to have herself become pregnant without their knowing; Carmen, who is now playing "girlfriend" to Alejandro, starts acting more like a celebrity than a maid, and its causing tensions between her and Odessa.
15	2	"The Dark at the Top of the Stairs"	Tawnia McKiernan	Brian Tanen	April 27, 2014	1.68
Rosie's immigration lawyer (Reggie) has her employed in the home of his elderly uncle (Kenneth Miller) who is debilitated by a stroke. Kenneth's adult daughter (Lucinda Miller) and young wife (Didi Miller) live with him but constantly bicker and force Rosie to take sides. Carmen sees Dario (Alejandro's ex-boyfriend) as a threat to her getting her music career unless she goes through the sham marriage with Alejandro. After Spence confessed to Peri about his affair with Rosie and that he wants a divorce, Peri threatens to ruin his career and flee to Europe with their son if he has any contact with Rosie. Peri reveals to Spence that she lied about being pregnant to keep him in the marriage. During the engagement party, a group of masked gunmen (the same group that broke into the home of the Powells) break in Alejandro's home. Alejandro is hit in the chest with a stray bullet from one of the gunmen and dies. Pablo and Valentina find out about Zoila's attempt to have Valentina fired from her job as a maid for the Powells. After having a talk with Marisol, Nicholas decides to have all of Dahlia's belongings donated to Goodwill. While cleaning the hall closet, Marisol finds an old letter from Dahlia's mother that says "Get Opal out of that house.".
16	3	"Dangerous Liaisons"	Tawnia McKiernan	Curtis Kheel	May 4, 2014	1.57
In the aftermath of Alejandro's death, Carmen and Odessa learn that they are about to be evicted, but when she learns that the entertainment industry will be at the funeral, Carmen takes advantage of the situation to get noticed; Marisol finally puts the face to Dahlia's description, and discovers that she was friends with Evelyn, who reveals to Marisol that Nicholas and Opal had a 15-year relationship, and suspects that Opal's son may be a product of that affair; Valentina tries to rebuff Ethan's offer to date him as she tries to get over Remi, and eventually gives in, unaware that back in the Congo Remi is sick and needs medical attention; Genevieve tries to lighten Zoila up by taking her to a seminar on gun safety, but after an argument ensues between her and Genevieve's friend Tayna after she calls her a maid, Zoila finds herself humiliated when she discovers that Genevieve has been gossiping about her; Rosie wants to get Kenneth into therapy immediately, but she becomes suspicious of Didi after she discovers Kenneth's doctor kissing Didi; Adrian decides to buy a gun against the wishes of Evelyn, and is almost killed by her husband after she is locked out. The tension is causing Evelyn to look for sexual comfort in Tony, who not only bought the gun for Adrian, but reveals to Evelyn that he has fallen for her and they share a passionate kiss together. Meanwhile, the murder of Alejandro brings out an individual who keeps showing up near the makeshift memorial but is warned by his associates to stay away, and is later found on the ground from an overdose of drugs by two girls with a note that read "I'm Sorry."
17	4	"Crimes of the Heart"	David Warren	Carol Leifer	May 11, 2014	1.65
A series of deceptions are twisted as Marisol, now more suspicious than ever about Nicholas and Opal's affair, learns that Nicholas has bequeathed his fortune to Ethan just as she asked for a prenuptial agreement, and then learns from Opal that Ethan was the product of a rape she endured, not knowing that Opal deceived Marisol after learning that she and Nicholas had a deal; With her marriage to Pablo now ending, Zoila is encouraged by Genevieve and Valentina to date a young man they set her up with, while Valentina is encouraged by Ethan to restart pursuing her fashion career; Rosie is encouraged to see Kenneth's rehabilitation improving and making a impression on Reggie, while at the same time is furious that Carmen is being hired by Spence as his new maid; Evelyn plots a scheme to get Adrian to leave town for two weeks so she and Tony can have their affair, but Tony insists that their time together be discreet when Adrian is not around.
18	5	"The Bad Seed"	David Warren	Elle Triedman	May 18, 2014	1.54
When Marisol invites a guy named Kim over to discuss plans for a book she is writing, Nicholas becomes uneasy and jealous over Marisol spending time with him; Rosie endures the wrath of Lucinda after she brings Miguel over while taking care of Kenneth, but when Lucinda spanks Miguel, Rosie lays down the law on her, only to discover that when Lucinda was 15 she was forced to give up her child for adoption by Kenneth, and Lucinda blames him for forcing the decision on her; Valentina is surprised by Remi's return from Africa, leaving Valentina conflicted over her choice between him and Ethan, to whom she finds herself drawn. When Valentina finally tells Remi that she has fallen for Ethan, Zoila tells him that she will not get involved, but Genevieve steps in to help her son win her back; Carmen learns that Spence is keeping an eye on his nephew Ty (the person who took the drugs and overdosed by Alejandro's makeshift memorial) so he will not go suicidal, and Carmen steps in to help, only to see Ty make matters worse for both him and Carmen after he throws a party that lands the two in jail, where Carmen revealed to Ty that she was in love with Alejandro; Evelyn is stunned that Tony wants to move out of the guest house and into the Powell mansion, making Evelyn furious over his demands; It is later revealed that Ty and Ethan are actually part of the team of masked gunmen that had been robbing the mansions. Ty is also being threatened by Ethan, who warns him that if he ever tells anyone about who actually killed Alejandro they will make sure that Ty will be pinned as the murderer.
19	6	"Private Lives"	Tara Nicole Weyr	Michal Zebede	May 25, 2014	1.78
After Marisol opens a book that Dahlia had in her library that featured a note written by Adrian, she asks Opal about whether they had an affair, but just as Opal is about to fix a lightbulb, she falls and is hospitalized but not before warning Marisol that she will tell Nicholas that it'll be her fault as long as Marisol stops asking questions. But as Marisol is about to bring her belongings to the hospital later on, she, along with Zolia, Carmen, and Rosie, discover that Opal and Dahlia were lesbians and they had an affair behind Nicholas' back. As Opal returns home, Marisol tells her she won't say anything else about Dahlia, but catches on seconds later when Opal become aware of Marisol knowing the truth; Rosie tells Reggie that she will help find Lucinda's daughter, and she does. But the reunion doesn't go well as planned as she punches Lucinda because four years earlier she hired a private detective to track Lucinda down but was told not to see her again, which Lucinda is now finding out and decides to kill Kenneth but Rosie stops her. Unfortunately, the news isn't good for Kenneth, as he informs — then speaks to — Reggie that he'll transfer the Power of Attorney over to him; Zoila finally cooks up her first relationship since her split from Pablo as she meets a famous chef, but after their first date the two decided to take it slow; Knowing that Ethan stands in the way of Valentina and Remi getting back together, Genevieve learns that Ethan wants to go Brown University and she gets him a admission there, only to have Valentina find out from Ethan, who in turn tells Remi that he isn't going anywhere, which in turn leads to Remi vowing to make sure that Ethan's life will be a living nightmare; Carmen believes that Ty's poetry that he writes in his diary can be useful as lyrics for her musical set at a club, but Ty doesn't want it be used in that manner and threatens her. However Ty changes his mind and lets Carmen use the words from the first page in the show and when he comes to see her perform Ty becomes impressed.
20	7	"Betrayal"	Tara Nicole Weyr	David Grubstick	June 1, 2014	2.14
Now that Marisol is aware of Opal and Dahlia's affair, she gives Nicholas an ultimatum: Opal leaves or she does. But when Nicholas decided to tell Opal that her services were no longer needed, it wouldn't be the answer that Opal wanted to hear, even if it cost them the truth about what happened to Dahlia that could send them to jail and to Ethan's inheritance; Zoila discovers that Javier is clueless about his maid even though he's not perfect when it comes to cleaning after himself, so she takes it upon herself to perform the tasks; As Valentina tells Remi that she's moved on to Ethan, Remi gives her a reminder that he'll be there for her. Valentina also walks in on Evelyn and Tony's lovemaking on the couch, and ends up giving "hints" to Adrian (when he asked about Evelyn) after she visits the spa, which results in Adrian making a surprise return home in front of a shocked Evelyn and Tony; Rosie gets caught in the middle between Spence and Reggie, who becomes jealous of Spence and decides to make sure that he stays away from Rosie by putting their confrontation online. Spence also finds out that Ty gave Carmen a gift and wants Carmen to return it because he fears Ty will be obsessed with Carmen, and when Ty kisses Carmen, she finally tells him that she's fallen for another man, leading Ty to assume it's Spence after he sees her consoling his uncle over the incident he had with Reggie. A flashback uncovers revelations over what happened between Nicholas, Dahlia and Opal, and it's discovered that Dahlia wanted out of the "experiment" (Opal and Dahlia's relationship in order to save her marriage to Nicholas), but in a moment of rage Opal pushed Dahlia over a bridge outside their mansion. It would be that same location that while taking a night jog, Nicholas would be run over by Opal, who stops to make sure he's dead.
21	8	"Night, Mother"	David Warren	Michal Zebede	June 8, 2014	1.82
As Nicholas prepares to face surgery in the wake of his hit-and-run from Opal, he asks Marisol to marry him, and Rosie, Carmen, and Zoila agree to help her. Meanwhile, Opal comes clean to Ethan about running over Nicholas (using Ethan's car) but exaggerates about what Nicholas told her about his inheritance, of which Ethan is stunned but now wants Opal out of his life and out of the mansion; Ty's jealousy towards Spence over a supposed relationship with Carmen intensifies when he spikes Spence's dish of Carmen's Puerto Rican stew with household cleaner that results in sending Spence to the hospital, thus prompting Spence to kick Ty out, but Ty is determined to make sure this isn't over as his crush on Carmen becomes a Dangerous obsession; Zoila is finding out how fast Genevieve is getting to know Javier after she invites him to dinner, and learns from Genevieve that she's suffering from kidney failure; Rosie is learning that Miguel is learning foul language and suspects Lucinda, who is furious and led to believe that Didi cut her off as Kenneth's Power of Attorney even though Reggie is the one responsible, as he influences Kenneth to kick Lucinda out by claiming that Rosie betrayed her, then turns around and tells Rosie that Didi is the one responsible and plans to kick her out soon (despite being the other way around when Reggie told Didi that contradicts what he told Rosie); Valentina informs Adrian and Evelyn that she's staying out of their marital problems as Adrian installs cameras to catch Evelyn and Tony together, but after Adrian asks Valentina to follow the two in the car he catches them but doesn't do anything to stop it. Finally, as she watches Marisol and Nicholas say their "I Do's" from the hospital bed, Opal's flashback about what happened after Dahlia's death adds another puzzle to the mystery as Opal stops Nicholas from calling the police and threatens to expose him as a murderer unless he agrees to provide for her and Ethan for the rest of their lives. It's also revealed that the five-year-old Ethan was a witness to covering this murder.
22	9	"The Visit"	David Warren	Elle Triedman	June 15, 2014	1.81
Marisol is learning a lot about her new nurse that she hired. Rosie, Carmen and Zoila see Marisol's new maid gossiping about Marisol at the restaurant. The girls tell everything to Marisol who forces her maid to sign a confidentiality agreement so she stops gossiping about her. Adrian is upset that Evelyn wants to continue her relationship with Tony, Marisol's new maid tells Adrian that Tony is not who he pretends to be because his name is not Tony. Genevieve is upset that Zoila would invite her mother to visit so she can help find a donor for her kidney operation, and boils over to the point that her mother spills the beans about why Genevieve acts like she thinks she's rich by hiding her past; Rosie tries to stop Didi from seeing Kenneth's doctor, who has become more obsessed with her, but after he shows up unannounced and drunk in front of Reggie, Rosie ends up telling Reggie about this, and he uses the opportunity to slip a letter about the affair into a stack of mail flyers that Rosie has been using to get Kenneth to read, leading to Didi receiving divorce papers from Kenneth's lawyers, only to discover later on from Rosie that Reggie deceived her when she sees the envelopes that matched the one that Kenneth opened; Ty coerces Ethan and his fellow partners into doing another heist, this time at Spence's, where he hopes to impress Carmen by being a hero, but the planned robbery/stunt takes a wrong turn when Carmen stabs a masked Ethan in the leg. While the incident did make Ty a hero of sorts for allowing Carmen to fend off the thieves, Ethan, fearing that the police will look for him at the hospital, turns to the only person who can save him and hide him from authorities: Valentina.
23	10	"Long Day's Journey Into Night"	John Scott	Curtis Kheel	June 22, 2014	1.93
In the 15 minutes after the events of the botched robbery/stunt, Ethan asks Valentina to get medical attention, and she does—from Remi, who discovers the next day after he stitched his wounds that Ethan is one of the suspects and tells Valentina, who wants Ethan to turn himself in, but after she leaves the police stops her (she was reaching for her tissue and was swerving while driving), and they discover Ethan's blood stains in the back seat; Marisol discovers that Nicholas (who had been using painkillers and is making him woozy) just confessed to her about being a murderer after the detectives arrive to question him about the hit-and-run, and when she tries to get him to admit about what he did but refuses to tell her upon finding out about that Opal blackmailed him, Marisol takes off her wedding ring and tells Nicholas that she will not be waiting for him; Rosie becomes more concerned about Kenneth after discovering that Reggie is taking advantage of using his uncle's fortune, as Reggie puts Kenneth in the hospital after Reggie refuses to give up the power of attorney upon discovering that Reggie is spending the money and hurting his uncle's company holdings; Spence starts to show signs of becoming an alcoholic after he loses custody of his son to Peri, and ends up taking a concerned Carmen along for the ride; Zoila convinces Genevieve to come home to face her mother in the effort to bury the hatchet, but the defrosting knocks both women out cold when the mother suffers a stroke.
24	11	"You Can't Take It with You"	John Scott	Carol Leifer	June 29, 2014	1.49
Marisol continues to put the pieces to the puzzle on how Nicholas was run down, and when the detectives tell her that there were no skid marks at the site, she suspects Opal is responsible after she sees the camera footage of Opal leaving in the car after Nicholas' jog. But when Opal arrives to face Marisol, she pulls out a gun to kill Marisol but Ethan stops his mother and confesses to Marisol about Opal pushing Dahlia over the bridge, and as Marisol calls the police, Opal takes the gun and shoots herself in the head; Valentina is forced by Zoila and Pablo to turn Ethan in (as he attempts to leave town) and hopefully at the same time keep Valentina out of jail when Pablo tells his daughter about his time in jail. The intervention brings Zoila and Pablo closer while Valentina tells Remi that she'll do the right thing, and they too embrace again; Rosie is learning that Reggie is going to send Kenneth to a nursing home in Sacramento, and when she visits Kenneth to help him she is confronted by Reggie, who threatens Rosie with deporting her if she reports him to the police; Now that Adrian knows about Tony's scheme to blackmail Evelyn, Adrian turns the tables on Tony by paying him off and to end his affair with Evelyn. Unfortunately, Tony is later assaulted at the ATM by a minion of Adrian's; Spence's downward spiral continues to take a toll on Carmen when his drinking starts to affect his work, prompting Carmen and Rosie to intervene by telling Spence that he needs to go to rehab.
25	12	"Proof"	David Grossman	Brian Tanen	July 6, 2014	1.86
The following day after Opal's suicide, Marisol becomes more suspicious of Nicholas' past, prompting Marisol to investigate Opal's apartment for evidence. After she comes up empty handed and tells Nicholas that even without any proof she will find out (and Nicholas telling her she will regret it), she discovers that Opal had a key to a safety deposit box at the bank, and thanks to Carmen making her look like Opal, Marisol gets in and unlocks the box which contains a bloody handkerchief and a newspaper clipping about a seven-year-old boy that was run down. Speaking of Carmen, she finds herself babysitting Tucker after the nanny that was hired by Peri was arrested, and things go downhill from there when the toddler nearly destroys her audition and career and admits to Rosie that she is not mother material. Rosie also took care of getting revenge on Reggie, even if it meant being threatened with losing her chance at US citizenship, by banding Lucinda, Didi and Kenneth together to nail Reggie for his lies and crimes. Zoila finds herself conflicted over Pablo (after they sleep together) and Javier (who surprises Zoila with a trip for two to Paris), while Genevieve seeks out a donor for her kidney, and Pablo is a perfect match. Finally, Valentina's decision to tell the police about Ethan has Ty worried, leading him to tell his partners that the only way to make sure they don't get caught is to get rid of Valentina.
26	13	"Look Back in Anger"	David Grossman	Matt Berry	July 13, 2014	2.23
Marisol discovers that the evidence she found lacks the proof needed to turn Nicholas in, so she forces Nicholas to come clean and tell the truth to the parents of the boy he accidentally killed 15 years earlier: The Powells, whose 25th wedding anniversary is dredging up more personal problems. Nicholas finally comes clean to Evelyn and Adrian about how he accidentally killed Barrett, (Dahlia told him about her affair while he was driving and did not see Barrett) which causes an enraged Adrian to slice Nicholas with a knife. While Evelyn keeps Adrian composed, Marisol tells them that Nicholas will turn himself over to the police. The confession also brings the Powells closer together as they both decide to forgive each other for all the wrongdoings that have occurred. Spence asks Rosie to marry him and she accepts, but thanks to his divorce and losing his job, Rosie has to find a way to cut back, and Carmen's job is one of them. After Carmen is fired, she discovers that her demo was passed on to a guy who happens to be the husband of a female record executive after she slept with him. Zoila is stunned to find out that Pablo is a donor match for Genevieve, and decides to end her relationship with Javier because she wants to give Pablo a second chance, only to change her mind later when she learns that Helen is the one that broke up with Pablo and that Pablo had been lying the whole time. This throws a wrench in Genevieve's surgery but at the same time produces a shocking result for Zoila when the doctor who did the test tells Zoila that she's pregnant. Valentina is offered an internship in New York but Remi decides not to follow her because of his mom's illness. At the same time Ty decides to carry out his plot to kill Valentina after his partners bail out by stealing Spence's gun, and sets his sights on targeting Valentina at the wedding. As Rosie and Spence finally tie the knot, Rosie is unaware that back in Mexico, her supposedly dead husband was found alive after the Mexican Federal Police breaks up a drug operation. At the wedding, Ty fires multiple shots at the crowd but not before being spotted by Carmen. The episode ends on a cliffhanger as the last scene shows Rosie dropping her blood-covered bouquet, unknown as to who was actually shot.

== Ratings ==
=== U.S. ratings ===
No. in series	No. in season	Episode	Air date	Time slot (EST)	Rating/Share (18–49)	Viewers (m)	Rank (18-49)
14	1	"An Ideal Husband"	April 20, 2014	Sundays; 10:00 P.M.	0.7	1.96	17
15	2	"The Dark at the Top of the Stairs"	April 27, 2014	Sundays; 10:00 P.M.	0.7	1.68	27
16	3	"Dangerous Liaisons"	May 4, 2014	Sundays; 10:00 P.M.	0.6	1.57	29
17	4	"Crimes of the Heart"	May 11, 2014	Sundays; 10:00 P.M.	0.6	1.65	30
18	5	"The Bad Seed"	May 18, 2014	Sundays; 10:00 P.M.	0.6	1.54	33
19	6	"Private Lives"	May 25, 2014	Sundays; 10:00 P.M.	0.6	1.78	9
20	7	"Betrayal"	June 1, 2014	Sundays; 10:00 P.M.	0.7	2.14	18
21	8	"Night, Mother"	June 8, 2014	Sundays; 10:00 P.M.	0.6	1.82	21
22	9	"The Visit"	June 15, 2014	Sundays; 10:00 P.M.	0.6	1.81	24
23	10	"Long Day's Journey Into Night"	June 22, 2014	Sundays; 10:00 P.M.	0.6	1.93	33
24	11	"You Can't Take It with You"	June 29, 2014	Sundays; 10:00 P.M.	0.4	1.49	69
25	12	"Proof"	July 6, 2014	Sundays; 10:00 P.M.	0.7	1.86	20
26	13	"Look Back in Anger"	July 13, 2014	Sundays; 10:00 P.M.	0.8	2.23	15
