= Devious Maids season 1 =

Devious Maids
- Season 1
- The DVD cover for the first season of Devious Maids
- Starring: Ana Ortiz; Dania Ramirez; Roselyn Sánchez; Judy Reyes; Edy Ganem; Rebecca Wisocky; Tom Irwin; Grant Show; Drew Van Acker; Susan Lucci; Mariana Klaveno; Brianna Brown; Brett Cullen; Wolé Parks
- No. of episodes: 13

Release
- Original network: Lifetime
- Original release: June 23 – September 22, 2013

Season chronology
- Next → Season 2

The first season of the American television comedy-drama series Devious Maids began airing on Lifetime on June 23, 2013. The season consisted of 13 episodes, and concluded on September 22, 2013, with a season high of nearly 3 million viewers. The pilot episode received positive reviews from critics. It tells the story of five Latina women who work as maids in Beverly Hills, and how they are affected when one of their friends, Flora, is murdered for knowing a secret. Marisol Suarez (Ana Ortiz), tries to figure out who was the killer in order to help her son get released from prison.

On August 13, 2013, Devious Maids was renewed for a second season, consisting of 13 episodes.

== Plot ==
The show opens with the murder of maid Flora Hernandez (Paula Garces) on a summer night of June 2013, and a man by the name of Eddie Suarez (Eddie Hassell) is arrested for the crime, which he allegedly did not commit. His mother, Marisol (Ana Ortiz) takes a job as a local Beverly Hills maid for Taylor (Brianna Brown) and Michael Stafford (Brett Cullen) in order to befriend three other local maids that were once friends with Flora. These include Rosie Falta (Dania Ramirez), a sweet and kindhearted maid who works for movie actors Peri (Mariana Klaveno) and Spence Westmore (Grant Show), and ends up having an affair with the latter; Carmen Luna (Roselyn Sanchez), an aspiring singer who works for Latino popstar Alejandro Rubio (Matt Cedeño), and eventually falls for her co-worker, Sam Alexander (Wolé Parks); and Zoila Diaz (Judy Reyes), longtime housekeeper for Genevieve Delatour (Susan Lucci). Zoila's daughter, Valentina Diaz (Edy Ganem), also stars; a 19-year-old wannabe fashion designer who has the 'hots' for Genevieve's son, Remi (Drew Van Acker). The season wraps up with Marisol discovering who killed Flora, and her son getting out of jail; Peri finds out about Rosie and Spence's affair and gets revenge by calling immigration; Carmen agrees to marry Alejandro in order to make the press believe he is not a homosexual, but this leads to the end of her romance with Sam; and Zoila has to wish her daughter a farewell as Valentina flies to Africa to be with Remi for the next year.

== Cast and characters ==
The show features an ensemble cast with female leads. Ana Ortiz, Dania Ramirez, Roselyn Sánchez, Judy Reyes and Edy Ganem play the lead roles where they are maids. Susan Lucci, Rebecca Wisocky, Brianna Brown, Mariana Klaveno, Tom Irwin, Brett Cullen and Grant Show plays the maids bosses and are rich Beverly Hills socialites. Drew Van Acker and Wolé Parks also had regular roles in the season. Several actors also appeared on a recurring basis in season one, including Emmy Award–winner Valerie Mahaffey as Olivia Rice, Stephen Collins as Philippe Delatour, Matt Cedeño as Alejandro Rubio, Melinda Page Hamilton as Odessa Burakov, Maria Howell as Ida Hayes, Alex Fernandez as Pablo Diaz, and Paula Garcés as Flora Hernandez.

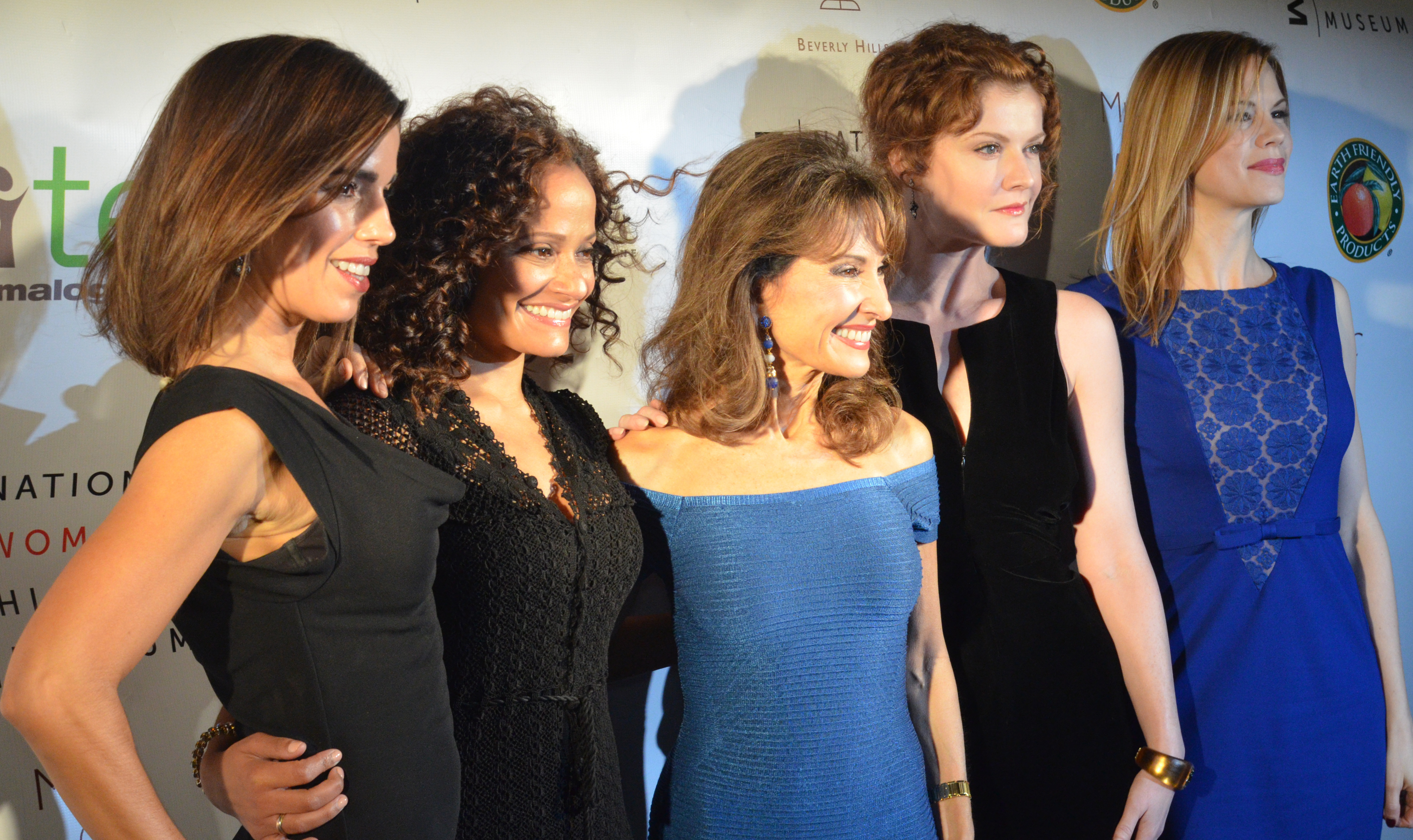
Ana Ortiz, Judy Reyes, Susan Lucci, Rebecca Wisocky, and Mariana Klaveno at event in October 2013

=== Casting ===
Dania Ramirez was the first lead cast member to be cast as Rosie, on February 15. Ana Ortiz joined the cast as the central character two days later on February 17. On February 23, both Sanchez and Judy Reyes were added to the cast as Carmen and Zoila respectively. When Edy Ganem was announced in the cast on March 2, the show was still described as centering on the other four maids (Ortiz, Reyes, Sanchez, and Ramirez).

After the pilot episode was picked to series by Lifetime, Wolé Parks was added to the cast in a regular role on November 21. Melinda Page Hamilton and Matt Cedeño were added to the cast in recurring roles with the promise of promotion if the show got picked up for a second season on November 26. Valerie Mahaffey also made cameo in pilot, and later had recurring role as Olivia Rice. Several actors from Desperate Housewives had roles in Devious Maids. Richard Burgi, Andrea Parker, Jolie Jenkins, Patrika Darbo, Dakin Matthews, and Liz Torres, who previously appeared in Desperate Housewives, have guest roles in the season.

== Cast ==
=== Main ===
- Ana Ortiz as Marisol Duarte/Suarez
- Dania Ramirez as Rosie Falta
- Roselyn Sánchez as Carmen Luna
- Judy Reyes as Zoila Diaz
- Edy Ganem as Valentina Diaz
- Rebecca Wisocky as Evelyn Powell
- Tom Irwin as Adrian Powell
- Grant Show as Spencer Westmore
- Drew Van Acker as Remi Delatour
- Susan Lucci as Genevieve Delatour
- Mariana Klaveno as Peri Westmore
- Brianna Brown as Taylor Stappord
- Brett Cullen as Michael Stappord
- Wolé Parks as Sam Alexander

=== Recurring ===
- Matt Cedeño as Alejandro Rubio
- Maria Howell as Ida Hayes
- Melinda Page Hamilton as Odessa Burakov
- Paula Garcés as Flora Hernandez
- Stephen Collins as Phillipe Delatour
- Valerie Mahaffey as Olivia Rice
- Eddie Hassell as Eddie Suarez

=== Guest ===
- Alex Fernandez as Pablo Diaz
- Octavio Westwood as Miguel Falta
- Damon Sementilli as Cody
- Dakin Matthews as Alfred Pettigrove
- Peter Porte as Scott
- Carlos Leal as Benny Soto

== Episodes ==
No. overall	No. in season	Title	Directed by	Written by	Original release date	US viewers (millions)
1	1	"Pilot"	Paul McGuigan	Teleplay by : Marc Cherry; Story by : Marc Chery	June 23, 2013	1.99
The series follows the lives of five Beverly Hills Hispanic maids as they navigate through the messy lives of their wealthy and snobbish employers. Rosie (Dania Ramirez), a single mother who left her son back in Mexico when her husband died, works as the housemaid/nanny for a pair of successful actors, Spence Westmore and his self-absorbed wife Peri. Aspiring singer Carmen (Roselyn Sanchez) hopes that her new pop star employer Alejandro can help kick-start her career, but Odessa, his very loyal and humorless Russian housekeeper and her boss, will stop at nothing to stand in the way of her dreams. Zoila (Judy Reyes) is the senior maid for Genevieve, a co-dependent, drug-addicted, emotionally unstable wealthy woman. She works alongside her teenage daughter Valentina (Edy Ganem), who has a crush on Genevieve's son, Remi. Newcomer Marisol (Ana Ortiz), whose appearance, knowledge and lack of a Spanish accent does not fit the description of the four aforementioned maids, is hired to clean the home of Taylor, the insecure second wife to a wealthy man, named Michael, whose ex-wife is stalking him. The maids turn to one another for support when their friend and fellow maid Flora (Paula Garcés) is brutally murdered at the home of her employers, the shallow and secretive Evelyn and Adrian Powell, at the biggest society event of the year just moments after she was supposedly raped by Adrian, which Evelyn believed was an affair and blamed Flora for having seduced Adrian. A young waiter, named Eddie, is found holding the bloody knife used in the killing at the scene and is arrested, but Flora in actuality was killed by another unseen person after she wrote a letter accusing the person of the crime. It is revealed at the end (unknown to both the other maids and their employers) that Marisol has infiltrated this inner high society circle to find out who set her son (Eddie the waiter) up.
2	2	"Setting the Table"	Rob Bailey	Marc Cherry	June 30, 2013	2.09
Spence begins to suspect that Peri is cheating on him when he finds underwear that doesn't belong to him, but Peri convinces Rosie to lie to him to cover for her. Rosie finds out that Peri is indeed cheating with her co-star, but ultimately Rosie decides not to tell Spence because he reminds her of her late husband. Meanwhile, Carmen takes advantage of the house and her co-worker Sam, while Alejandro is away. Carmen reveals to Sam that she refuses to be in a relationship because her last boyfriend wasn't supportive of her dreams. Valentina bonds with Remi over their shared love of old movies and manages to ingratiate herself with his college friends. Zoila, disapproving of this, convinces Genevieve to throw a party where Remi's friends will see her at work. Afterwards, Valentina admits her feelings to Genevieve who agrees to help her. Taylor refuses to let Marisol continue working for the Powells because she considers them horrible people. Adrian (rightly suspecting that Marisol is not who she appears to be) convinces Taylor to let Marisol to continue to help them with the housekeeping. Marisol discovers Flora's note which Adrian immediately snatches. Marisol (who earlier in the beginning of the episode relived through flashbacks about how she began her quest to clear her son's name) visits Eddie in jail where he tells her that he and Flora dated and added that at the time of the murder the real killer knocked him out and placed the knife on him; Marisol, who also memorized portions of the note, believes it may hold a clue and tells her son she'll search for it. As Adrian reads Flora's letter, she accuses someone of not protecting her from an unknown man. Adrian immediately burns the note.
3	3	"Wiping Away the Past"	Rob Bailey	Victor Levin	July 7, 2013	2.53
When Michael's ex-wife, Olivia, drops a bomb about Taylor's past, Marisol helps Taylor keep it together. Adrian tries to cheer up his newly divorced friend the only way he knows how, to Evelyn's displeasure. Unbeknownst to Zoila, Valentina and Genevieve team up to get Remi to notice Valentina as more than just a friend. Meanwhile, Spence offers to help Rosie out of a bind, but Rosie wonders if his generosity comes with strings attached. Carmen finally gets a meeting with a major music producer and needs Sam's help to sell her diva image.
4	4	"Making Your Bed"	David Warren	John Paul Bullock III	July 14, 2013	2.23
The arrival of Genevieve's brother Henri complicates matters for Zoila, whose heart he broke years before. Rosie vows to help Spence with his marriage, and tensions between Carmen and Odessa are at an all-time high when Alejandro allows Carmen to be a guest at the party he's hosting while Odessa works in her place. Meanwhile, Marisol offers to work a fundraiser at the Powell house in order to uncover more information about Flora's murder.
5	5	"Taking Out the Trash"	David Warren	Gloria Calderon Kellett	July 21, 2013	2.78
A visitor from Carmen's past tries to win her back. Evelyn and Adrian mark the anniversary date of a tragic event. Peri suspects Spence is having an affair, after he asks her for an open marriage. Remi brings home a date... and Valentina is not thrilled. Marisol and Eddie make a crucial discovery about Flora, that could make or break Eddie's murder conviction.
6	6	"Walking the Dog"	Tawnia McKiernan	Brian Tanen	July 28, 2013	2.88
Zoila's job is jeopardized when Genevieve has financial troubles and Marisol makes a discovery at the Powell house. In the meantime, Carmen is jealous when Sam starts dating and Valentina worries about Remi's erratic behavior.
7	7	"Taking a Message"	Tawnia McKiernan	Tanya Saracho	August 4, 2013	2.74
In a series of events that takes place over the course of two days, Rosie is suspicious about Marisol after a college student comes up to Marisol and calls her a professor—and her real last name. Marisol in return vows to retaliate against Rosie about her texts that she has been getting from Spence (which viewers could see onscreen that were coming from him). The two come to a truce to help each other so they could find out the truth behind Flora's murder while keeping their alliance a secret from the other maids. Valentina believes Remi is doing drugs, only to learn that Zoila had known about his habit early on and steps in to do damage control. As Carmen and Sam agree to be boyfriend and girlfriend, Carmen asks Sam about what he likes about his job. Olivia helps a frustrated and delirious Evelyn look for a new maid, and Rosie answers the call (as she becomes the mole for Marisol).
8	8	"Minding the Baby"	Tara Nicole Weyr	Gloria Calderon Kellett	August 11, 2013	2.66
As Rosie infiltrates the Powell household to find the DVD of Flora that Marisol needs as evidence, Evelyn becomes fixated on Peri's son after Rosie brings him over. After getting carried away with him to make up for the loss of her son Barrett, Evelyn apologizes to Rosie for keeping the child away for too long and when she offers her a job, Rosie (after she sees the evidence located in the Powell's safe, and whose combination password is that of her late son's first name), accepts. At the same time Marisol helps Taylor with trying to have a child at a fertility clinic, unaware that word does travels fast when a so-called former friend of Olivia's tips her off. Meanwhile, when Carmen learns that Odessa is trying place the blame for her chores on her in front of Alejandro, Carmen discovers that Odessa is using that reason to hide her battle with cancer that resulted in her loss of her leg that ended her career as a ballerina in Russia. Zoila and Valentina intervene in Genevieve's attempt to marry a 76-year-old blind man who believes Genevieve is 39 and hopes that she will give him a family. He makes a deal to marry Genevieve if Valentina becomes the egg donor.
9	9	"Scrambling the Eggs"	Tara Nicole Weyr	Tanya Saracho	August 18, 2013	2.56
In the course of two months, Rosie, fearing that Evelyn will become obsessed with Tucker, decides its time to quit for the Powells. But when Rosie and Spence's affair is discovered by Evelyn, she finds a way to blackmail Rosie by asking her to bring Tucker over so she won't tell Peri but Adrian is determined to stop Evelyn from growing more attached to the Westmore's son. Marisol follows up on a lead from the DVD that leads her to Flora's grandmother (who is suffering from Alzheimer's disease) and discovers that another person that was close to Flora and her boyfriend is also involved. Carmen encourages Odessa to come clean to Alejandro about her cancer treatments, only to discover how cold Alejandro is to the ladies about Odessa's condition. Genevieve is put at a disadvantage after Zoila refuses to allow Valentina to be an egg donor but Valentina (who really wants to go to fashion school) is tempted to take the offer after she is asked by Genevieve's boyfriend.
10	10	"Hanging the Drapes"	John Scott	Brian Tanen	August 25, 2013	2.48
Marisol discovers about the fact that Eddie never knew about Flora having seen one of his friends, who could have impregnated her. The lawyer then tells Marisol that Eddie was a drug dealer and one of his partners may have known about Flora being pregnant, putting Marisol in a difficult position about finding the truth and deciding if she should continue helping Eddie. At the same time, Taylor reveals that she is pregnant but Michael decides to let Olivia know, even if she is not comfortable about the news. Marisol then uses Eddie's catering services to lure Eddie's friend into helping set up a dinner for Taylor and Michael and their guests. Valentina is worried about Remi's behavior after he returns from rehab but its Valentina who becomes upset over how he sees her as the hired help, while Genevieve and her ex-husband Phillipe decide to get reacquainted as friends. Rosie is caught in a tangled web between helping Spence and Peri seek marriage counseling and being propositioned by Adrian at the same time. After getting off on the wrong foot, Carmen wants Alejandro to become more trusting to her, and he agrees to open up to her—where he reveals to Carmen that he is gay. During the dinner, Marisol confronts Eddie's friend and he points the person out to her as Remi, but at the same time she sees Olivia hanging from a tree (after she attempts suicide), she then notices Remi racing with a knife after he cuts the tasseled ropes off.
11	11	"Cleaning Out the Closet"	John Scott	Victor Levin	September 8, 2013	2.49
Alejandro and Carmen offer different opinions about his new relationship, as Alejandro (who wants to keep his sexual identity a secret from the public), considers dumping his boyfriend (a "neat freak") after he lets him stay with him, leading Carmen to tell his lover the truth that he wants to end it. Eventually, the guy destroys everything in response, but not before seeking revenge by giving a photo of the two together to a tabloid paper. Marisol gets closer to the truth by testing the theory to see if Remi knew anything about Flora being pregnant, prompting Ida to become suspicious of Remi and warning Marisol about Michael, who happens to be the lawyer of both Remi and the supposed killer. At the same time, Taylor becomes jealous of Michael spending time seeing Olivia at the hospital, so Marisol suggest to Taylor that she should be supportive by going with Michael, who then suggests that she should keep an eye on Marisol's activities after Taylor tells him that she was eavesdropping on his phone conversation in his office room; Rosie cleans up a serious mess for Peri, who accidentally causes a hit-and-run on a jogger, who survived the incident and saw the driver. This causes Rosie to distrust Peri and causes Rosie to ask Spence if they want to be together, while Peri convinces her studio boss to help her bring Rosie's son to America. Philippe and Genevieve grow closer, but Zoila does not believe that he is changed his philandering ways, so she uses a scheme to show proof, along with a distrusting Remi learning the truth about his father after he knocks him for insulting Valentina, then whispering something in his ear (indicating that Remi knows something about Philippe and Flora). But the plan backfires as Genevieve tells Zoila that she wants to go ahead with the wedding plans.
12	12	"Getting Out the Blood"	Larry Shaw	Marc Cherry	September 15, 2013	2.52
Carmen is tempted by a reporter to out Alejandro and is willing to pay if she goes through with it, but believes that Alejandro should do it himself. However, the matters are made worse when Sam returns to resume his relationship with Carmen and is caught in the middle after he hugs Alejandro while they are in boxers, which is caught on camera and leaked to the internet, prompting Alejandro to come up with a solution while leaving Sam embarrassed; Rosie is stunned by Spence's return and his decision to ask Rosie to marry him, but Rosie is even more stunned by Peri's announcement that she plans to bring Rosie's son Miguel to America, putting Rosie in an awkward position between the troubled couple and where her loyalty lies. Remi, who has forgiven Philippe after admitting that he was trying to protect him from being accused as the father of Flora's unborn child, is accepted to medical school and will spend a year in Africa, but he wants Valentina to come with him and Zoila is making sure that does not happen. Meanwhile, Genevieve asks Evelyn to hold a wedding reception at the Powells', whose own marriage could be headed for a costly divorce after Evelyn tells Adrian that she wants to end theirs because of Adrian's admission that he does love her but will not be intimate with her; Marisol learns more of Philippe's involvement with Flora after Zoila tells her about Remi hitting his father, leading Philippe to learn from Michael about Marisol and when her identity is discovered Philippe tells Michael that he will take care of the situation, making Michael nervous and decides to warn Marisol anyway, but Taylor, who now knows the truth, wants her to stay. Unfortunately, Philippe hired a hitman to kill Marisol, but instead shoots the pregnant Taylor by mistake.
13	13	"Totally Clean"	Larry Shaw	Marc Cherry	September 22, 2013	2.95
As Taylor learns that she has lost the baby, she tells Michael it's time to tell Marisol about Flora. Marisol finally comes clean to the other maids about herself as well as her quest to clear her son, and they all band together to help her expose Flora's real killer. Carmen's relationship with Sam and her friendship with Odessa is about to get an unwelcome reaction as Alejandro asks Carmen to marry him in order to keep his sexual orientation a secret by helping her finally get a record deal as part of the pact. Meanwhile, Rosie and Spence's relationship is discovered by Peri after she overhears the conversation on the phone from Miguel. Remi's disappearance has Genevieve worried and Valentina disappointed as Genevieve's engagement party nears, with Philippe attempting to convince Genevieve to elope after the party by taking her out of the country while Valentina becomes furious about Zoila lying to her about the letter she had written about Remi. The news of Taylor and Michael at the hospital prompts Adrian and Evelyn to postpone their divorce and suspect that something behind it isn't right when Philippe asks for their private jet. At the engagement party, the ladies finally corner the real killer, as Marisol confronts Philippe in the same room where Flora was killed, but after Evelyn discovers her and has her escorted out, it's Adrian who kills Philippe by poisoning his drink upon learning that Philippe was the person who showed up the night uninvited and stabbed Flora to death, of which he would later confess to Michael as Marisol found out at the hospital. The ladies, unaware of Philippe's demise (Adrian and Evelyn tell the police that he committed suicide), tell the police that he confessed out loud before he died, helping Marisol and clearing Eddie of Flora's murder. However, this happy ending is stunted when ICE (U.S. Immigration and Customs Enforcement) officers arrive to arrest Rosie during a celebration of Eddie's release, as Peri (who was the one who called the ICE) looks on in the background.

== Broadcasting ==
The first season aired on Lifetime, Sundays at 10:00 pm. The show was originally in development to air on ABC. however it was not picked up by the network. Lifetime then picked up the pilot with a thirteen-order run. The pilot episode was released online on June 9, 2013, before its television debut.

The pilot drew 1.99 million viewers, and in episode six, shot up 45 percent from the series premiere, to 2.90 million viewers. The first-season finale was the highest-rated episode of the season, peaking at 3 million viewers.

== Ratings ==
=== U.S. ratings ===
No. in series	No. in season	Episode	Air date	Time slot (EST)	Rating/Share (18–49)	Viewers (m)	Rank (18-49)
1	1	"Pilot"	June 23, 2013	Sundays; 10:00 P.M.	0.7	1.99	27
2	2	"Setting the Table"	June 30, 2013	Sundays; 10:00 P.M.	0.6	2.09	37
3	3	"Wiping Away the Past"	July 7, 2013	Sundays; 10:00 P.M.	0.9	2.53	14
4	4	"Making Your Bed"	July 14, 2013	Sundays; 10:00 P.M.	0.8	2.23	18
5	5	"Taking Out the Trash"	July 21, 2013	Sundays; 10:00 P.M.	1.0	2.78	10
6	6	"Walking the Dog"	July 28, 2013	Sundays; 10:00 P.M.	1.1	2.88	9
7	7	"Taking a Message"	August 4, 2013	Sundays; 10:00 P.M.	1.0	2.74	11
8	8	"Minding the Baby"	August 11, 2013	Sundays; 10:00 P.M.	0.9	2.66	11
9	9	"Scrambling the Eggs"	August 18, 2013	Sundays; 10:00 P.M.	0.9	2.56	15
10	10	"Hanging the Drapes"	August 25, 2013	Sundays; 10:00 P.M.	0.9	2.48	15
11	11	"Cleaning Out the Closet"	September 8, 2013	Sundays; 10:00 P.M.	0.8	2.49	10
12	12	"Getting Out the Blood"	September 15, 2013	Sundays; 10:00 P.M.	0.9	2.52	10
13	13	"Totally Clean"	September 22, 2013	Sundays; 10:00 P.M.	1.1	2.95	3
