= List of Devious Maids episodes =

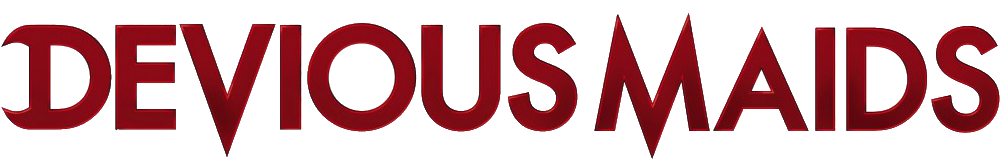

Devious Maids is an American mystery comedy-drama television series, which premiered on Lifetime on June 23, 2013. The series was created by Marc Cherry, and is loosely based on Mexican TV series Ellas son la Alegría del Hogar. Ana Ortiz, Dania Ramirez, Roselyn Sánchez, Judy Reyes, and Edy Ganem star as five Latina maids working in the homes of Beverly Hills’ wealthiest and most powerful families.

ABC ordered the pilot on January 31, 2012. On May 14, 2012, the pilot was not picked up by ABC for the 2012–13 United States network schedule. However, on June 22, 2012, Lifetime picked up the pilot with a thirteen-episode order. Lifetime renewed the show for a 10-episode fourth season on September 24, 2015.

During the course of the series, 49 episodes of Devious Maids aired. On September 1, 2016, Lifetime canceled Devious Maids after four seasons.

== Series overview ==
Season	Episodes	Originally released	
Season	Episodes	First released	Last released
1	13	June 23, 2013	September 22, 2013
2	13	April 20, 2014	July 13, 2014
3	13	June 1, 2015	August 24, 2015
4	10	June 6, 2016	August 8, 2016

== Episodes ==
=== Season 1 (2013) ===
No. overall	No. in season	Title	Directed by	Written by	Original release date	US viewers (millions)
1	1	"Pilot"	Paul McGuigan	Teleplay by : Marc Cherry; Story by : Marc Chery	June 23, 2013	1.99
2	2	"Setting the Table"	Rob Bailey	Marc Cherry	June 30, 2013	2.09
3	3	"Wiping Away the Past"	Rob Bailey	Victor Levin	July 7, 2013	2.53
4	4	"Making Your Bed"	David Warren	John Paul Bullock III	July 14, 2013	2.23
5	5	"Taking Out the Trash"	David Warren	Gloria Calderon Kellett	July 21, 2013	2.78
6	6	"Walking the Dog"	Tawnia McKiernan	Brian Tanen	July 28, 2013	2.88
7	7	"Taking a Message"	Tawnia McKiernan	Tanya Saracho	August 4, 2013	2.74
8	8	"Minding the Baby"	Tara Nicole Weyr	Gloria Calderon Kellett	August 11, 2013	2.66
9	9	"Scrambling the Eggs"	Tara Nicole Weyr	Tanya Saracho	August 18, 2013	2.56
10	10	"Hanging the Drapes"	John Scott	Brian Tanen	August 25, 2013	2.48
11	11	"Cleaning Out the Closet"	John Scott	Victor Levin	September 8, 2013	2.49
12	12	"Getting Out the Blood"	Larry Shaw	Marc Cherry	September 15, 2013	2.52
13	13	"Totally Clean"	Larry Shaw	Marc Cherry	September 22, 2013	2.95

=== Season 2 (2014) ===
No. overall	No. in season	Title	Directed by	Written by	Original release date	US viewers (millions)
14	1	"An Ideal Husband"	Eva Longoria	Marc Cherry	April 20, 2014	1.96
15	2	"The Dark at the Top of the Stairs"	Tawnia McKiernan	Brian Tanen	April 27, 2014	1.68
16	3	"Dangerous Liaisons"	Tawnia McKiernan	Curtis Kheel	May 4, 2014	1.57
17	4	"Crimes of the Heart"	David Warren	Carol Leifer	May 11, 2014	1.65
18	5	"The Bad Seed"	David Warren	Elle Triedman	May 18, 2014	1.54
19	6	"Private Lives"	Tara Nicole Weyr	Michal Zebede	May 25, 2014	1.78
20	7	"Betrayal"	Tara Nicole Weyr	David Grubstick	June 1, 2014	2.14
21	8	"Night, Mother"	David Warren	Michal Zebede	June 8, 2014	1.82
22	9	"The Visit"	David Warren	Elle Triedman	June 15, 2014	1.81
23	10	"Long Day's Journey Into Night"	John Scott	Curtis Kheel	June 22, 2014	1.93
24	11	"You Can't Take It with You"	John Scott	Carol Leifer	June 29, 2014	1.49
25	12	"Proof"	David Grossman	Brian Tanen	July 6, 2014	1.86
26	13	"Look Back in Anger"	David Grossman	Matt Berry	July 13, 2014	2.23

=== Season 3 (2015) ===
No. overall	No. in season	Title	Directed by	Written by	Original release date	US viewers (millions)
27	1	"Awakenings"	David Warren	Marc Cherry & Brian Tanen	June 1, 2015	1.47
28	2	"From Here to Eternity"	David Warren	Curtis Kheel	June 8, 2015	1.42
29	3	"The Awful Truth"	Gil Junger	Ric Swartzlander	June 15, 2015	1.34
30	4	"Since You Went Away"	Gil Junger	Davah Avena	June 22, 2015	1.14
31	5	"The Talk of the Town"	Tara Nicole Weyr	Charise Castro Smith	June 29, 2015	1.34
32	6	"She Done Him Wrong"	Tara Nicole Weyr	David Grubstick	July 6, 2015	1.34
33	7	"The Turning Point"	Victor Nelli, Jr.	Charise Castro Smith	July 13, 2015	1.35
34	8	"Cries and Whispers"	Victor Nelli, Jr.	David Grubstick	July 20, 2015	1.17
35	9	"Bad Girl"	David Grossman	Brian Tanen & Davah Avena	July 27, 2015	1.27
36	10	"Whiplash"	David Grossman	Benjamin Wiggins & Christian Spicer	August 3, 2015	1.41
37	11	"Terms of Endearment"	David Warren	Ric Swartzlander	August 10, 2015	1.34
38	12	"Suspicion"	David Warren	Curtis Kheel	August 17, 2015	1.52
39	13	"Anatomy of a Murder"	Tara Nicole Weyr	Brian Tanen	August 24, 2015	1.53

=== Season 4 (2016) ===
No. overall	No. in season	Title	Directed by	Written by	Original release date	US viewers (millions)
40	1	"Once More Unto the Bleach"	David Warren	Brian Tanen	June 6, 2016	1.08
41	2	"Another One Wipes the Dust"	David Warren	Curtis Kheel	June 13, 2016	1.07
42	3	"War and Grease"	Mary Lou Belli	Davah Avena	June 20, 2016	0.81
43	4	"Sweeping with the Enemy"	Mary Lou Belli	Ric Swartzlander	June 27, 2016	0.96
44	5	"A Time to Spill"	David Grossman	Sheila Lawrence	July 4, 2016	0.94
45	6	"The Maid Who Knew Too Much"	David Grossman	Jessica Kivnik & David Grubstick	July 11, 2016	1.03
46	7	"Blood, Sweat, and Smears"	Elodie Keene	Davah Avena & Amelia Sims	July 18, 2016	0.82
47	8	"I Saw the Shine"	Elodie Keene	David Grubstick	July 25, 2016	0.87
48	9	"Much Ado About Buffing"	Victor Nelli, Jr.	Curtis Kheel	August 1, 2016	0.78
49	10	"Grime and Punishment"	Victor Nelli, Jr.	Brian Tanen	August 8, 2016	0.86

== Ratings ==
Devious Maids : U.S. viewers per episode (millions)

Season	Episode number													Average
Season	1	2	3	4	5	6	7	8	9	10	11	12	13	Average
1	1.99	2.09	2.53	2.23	2.78	2.88	2.74	2.66	2.56	2.48	2.49	2.52	2.95	2.53
2	1.96	1.68	1.57	1.65	1.54	1.78	2.14	1.82	1.81	1.93	1.49	1.86	2.23	1.81
3	1.47	1.42	1.34	1.14	1.34	1.34	1.35	1.17	1.27	1.41	1.34	1.52	1.53	1.36
4	1.08	1.07	0.81	0.96	0.94	1.03	0.82	0.87	0.78	0.86	–			0.92

Audience measurement performed by Nielsen Media Research
