= Pilot (Devious Maids) =

- Devious Maids episode
- Episode no.: Season 1 Episode 1
- Directed by: Paul McGuigan
- Written by: Marc Cherry
- Original air date: June 23, 2013

Guest appearances
- Paula Garcés as Flora Hernandez; Matt Cedeño as Alejandro Rubio; Melinda Page Hamilton as Odessa Burakov; Andrea Parker as Brenda Colfax (uncredited); Valerie Mahaffey as Olivia Rice; Michael Patrick McGill as Detective; Mike Gomez as Priest; Eddie Hassell as Eddie

Episode chronology
← Previous —	Next → "Setting The Table"

"Pilot" is the series premiere to the Lifetime series Devious Maids. The pilot had been ordered by ABC on January 31, 2012, and cast during the following two months. Filming began in March. ABC declined to pick up the pilot on May 14, but Lifetime did so on June 22, ordering 13 episodes. Although most of the cast had been selected by this time three additional regular supporting characters were added in November 2012 for inclusion in the pilot and the continuing series.

The episode revolves around the murder of a Latina maid in Beverly Hills and the introduction of her cadre of associates who are also Latina maids. The maids are shown in their employment surroundings with their upper class employers who play supporting roles. The main character is not actually a maid but rather the mother of the primary murder subject who poses as a maid to gain entrance into the world where she might find clues to prove her son's innocence.

The pilot episode was released online in both Spanish and English on June 9, 2013, before its television debut on June 23. The episode, which was written by series creator Marc Cherry and directed by Paul McGuigan, debuted with a 1.99 rating. The episode was the first episode of any television series with an all Latina leading cast, but the roles as maids was controversial due to its presentation of Latinas in stereotypical roles. Nonetheless, critical feedback was generally positive.

== Plot ==
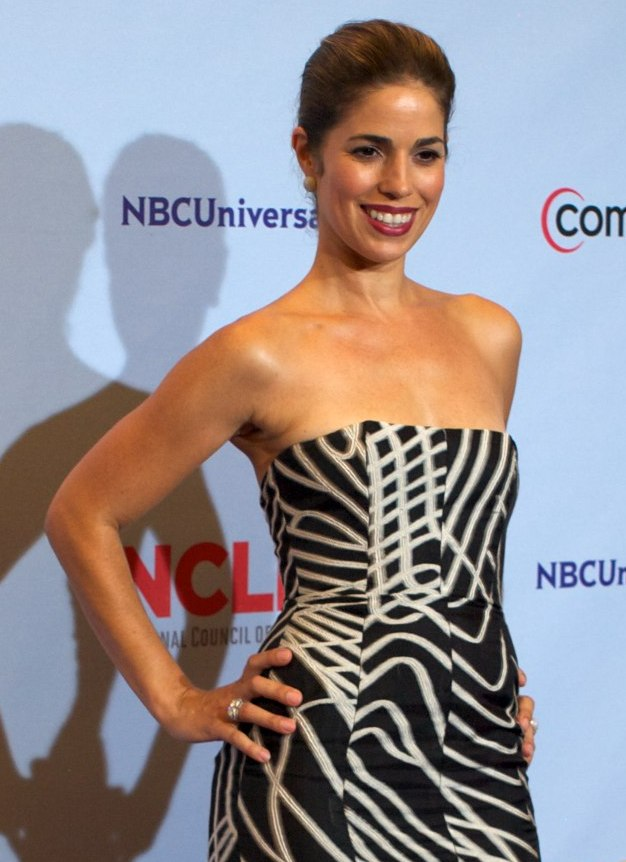
Ana Ortiz plays Marisol, the central character of the show.

In the opening scene, Evelyn Powell (Rebecca Wisocky) gives her maid Flora (Paula Garces) the following warning "I think what you people do is heroic ... You wash clothes you can't afford. You polish silver you will never dine with. ... I am in awe of your determination to succeed in this great country of ours. That said, if you don't stop screwing my husband, I'm going to have you deported." Subsequently, a season-long story arc around which the show revolves begins with Flora's murder.

Flora was stabbed by a mysterious figure while scrawling a rape claim that accuses Evelyn's husband Adrian Powell (Tom Irwin). She manages to drag herself to the pool during a lavish party and falls in. At her funeral, her four maid friends Zoila (Judy Reyes), Valentina (Edy Ganem), Rosie (Dania Ramirez) and Carmen (Roselyn Sanchez) agree not to divulge their knowledge of the infidelity and its circumstances.

The employer of Zoila and her daughter Valentina, Genevieve Delatour (Susan Lucci), is enduring emotional distress. For both personal reasons and out of concern for Genevieve, Valentina comes up with the idea that Genevieve's son Remi (Drew Van Acker) should return to live at home rather than University of Southern California campus housing in order to help stabilize his mother. Zoila eventually recognizes and tries to temper Valentina's romantic interest in Remi.

Meanwhile, Rosie is fighting for her young son to join her from Mexico while working for the self-absorbed Spence (Grant Show) and Peri (Mariana Klaveno). Along with Sam Alexander (Wolé Parks) and Odessa Burakov (Melinda Page Hamilton) Carmen is a staff member for Latino music star Alejandro Rubio (Matt Cedeño) who she is trying to convince to help her start her music career. Marisol (Ana Ortiz), who is not really a maid, successfully interviews to be the fifth maid for the show as an employee of second wife Taylor (Brianna Brown) and Michael (Brett Cullen), who hires her despite objections from Taylor.

== Background and production ==
The teleplay and story were written by series creator Marc Cherry, and the episode was directed by Paul McGuigan. Most filming occurred in and around Los Angeles. Cherry created the show with a multiple female lead dynamic that was similar to his previous success, Desperate Housewives. His first job in Hollywood was as a personal assistant, allowing him to relate to the maid characters to some degree. He felt that Devious Maids provided a vehicle to deal with themes that Desperate Housewives did not, while being very different than the similarly themed Downton Abbey, due to Downton's historic nature. The format of the show that was pitched to ABC was as a spinoff of Desperate Housewives. While Roselyn Sanchez's character Carmen appeared as a gardener in the final episode of Desperate Housewives, "Finishing the Hat", the final version that was produced is not strictly a spinoff.

ABC ordered the pilot based on the Mexican telenovela Ellas son la Alegría del Hogar (translation: "They Are the Home's Joy", which is sometimes referred to as The Disorderly Maids Of The Neighborhood), on January 31, 2012. Dania Ramirez was the first lead cast member to be cast, being announced on February 15. Ana Ortiz joined the cast as the central character on February 17. On February 23, both Sanchez and Judy Reyes were added to the cast. When Edy Ganem was announced in the cast on March 2 the show was still described as centering on the other four maids (Ortiz, Reyes, Sanchez and Ramirez).

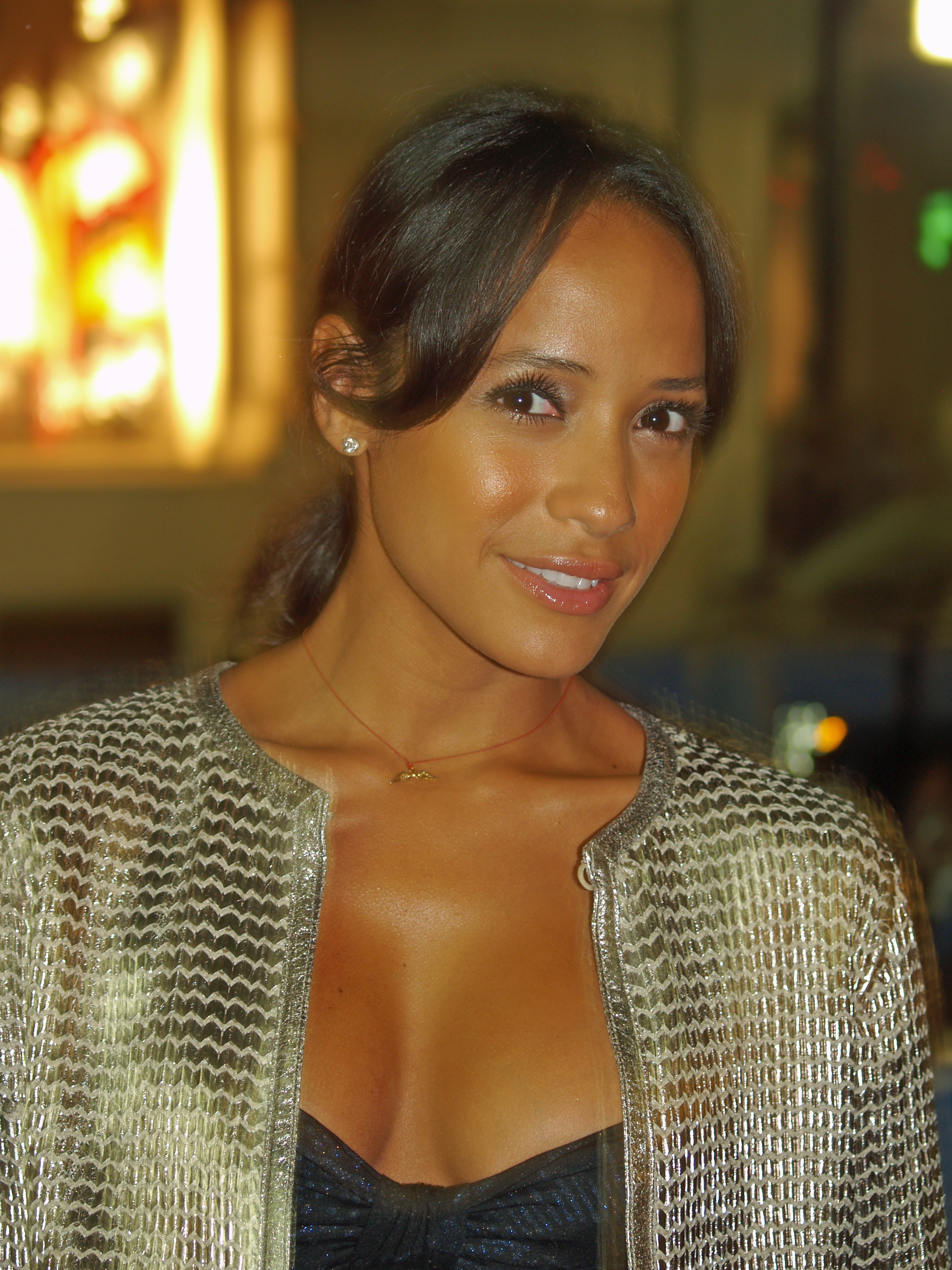
Dania Ramirez plays Rosie.

Rebecca Wisocky, who joined the cast on February 23, had previously guest starred on Desperate Housewives as Bree Van de Kamp's mother. She had shot the final season episode, "Women and Death" less than a month before testing for Devious Maids. Most of the other supporting roles were filled in during March: Brianna Brown (March 6); Susan Lucci, Drew Van Acker and Brett Cullen (all March 9); Mariana Klaveno and Grant Show (both March 12); and Tom Irwin (March 16); Brown was considered for the show after she impressed executive producer Sabrina Wind with her 2011 season 1 guest appearance on Homeland.

Eva Longoria was announced as an executive producer on March 26. She had worked previously with Cherry on Desperate Housewives, and was hired to add perspective to the Latina roles. ABC Studios gave Cherry permission to start making senior staffing offers for the show on May 1, which was perceived as an indication that the show would be picked up.

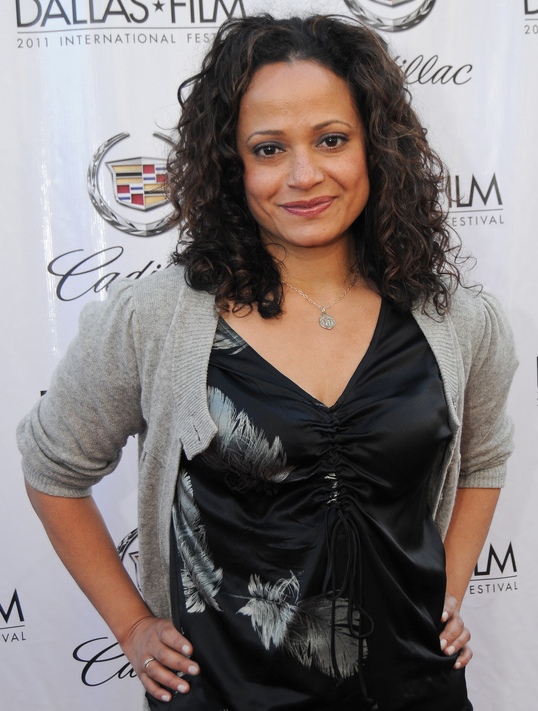
Judy Reyes plays Zoila.

On May 14, 2012, the pilot was not picked up by ABC for the 2012–13 United States network schedule. On June 22, Lifetime picked up the pilot with a thirteen-episode order. The network stated that they were "thrilled to be getting into business with one of entertainment’s true visionaries. This show and Marc Cherry’s unique story telling voice perfectly articulate Lifetime’s strategy of attracting top-tier creatives with their most original and exciting projects." Wolé Parks was added to the cast in a regular role on November 21. Melinda Page Hamilton and Matt Cedeño were added to the cast in recurring roles with the promise of promotion if the show got picked up for a second season on November 26. Both were expected to appear in the pilot episode.

The episode was marketed as an important milestone in television history because it was the debut of the first television show with an all Latina leading cast. However, in the days leading up to the debut, there was controversy surrounding the concept of having Latina actresses glorify the stereotypical roles of maids, nannies and gardeners. On May 3, Tanisha Ramirez criticized the show in The Huffington Post as a wasted opportunity, but executive producer Longoria countered that the show presents "modern day woman's view on universal themes." Cosmopolitan for Latinas editor Michelle Herrera Mulligan responded to Longoria by calling the show an "insulting disgrace". Cherry defended the show for its substantive themes: "Devious Maids deals with themes of racism, classism and immigration. These women all work in the homes of rich people, but they have goals and dreams that are much greater than the people they work for realize."

The pilot episode was released online in both Spanish and English on June 9, 2013, before its television debut on a variety of platforms, including myLifetime.com and the Lifetime video watch app. The first two episodes were available on Lifetime. In the weeks before its June 23 premiere, the cast members were scheduled to host screenings around the country: Ramirez and Sanchez on June 4 in Miami, Reyes and Ganem on June 6 in Dallas, and Ortiz and Lucci on June 11 in Chicago. The show's premier party was held in Los Angeles on June 17.

== Reception ==
=== Ratings ===
The episode first aired on June 23, 2013, in the United States, debuting with a 1.99 rating in the 10PM (Eastern Time Zone) time slot. In the adults 18-49 viewer demographic, Devious Maids posted a 0.65 rating, which lagged the 0.74 rating for The Client List's season finale the week before in the same time slot for Lifetime. Cable television shows in the same time slot included the Mad Men season 6 finale, "In Care Of", on AMC (which drew a 2.69 rating), Falling Skies on TNT (3.59 rating). The shows ratings were modest compared to other Lifetime drama series debuts such as Drop Dead Diva, The Client List and Army Wives, which all had ratings close to 3 million. Approximately one third of the Devious Maids viewership for the pilot (662,000) were from the Lifetime network's target demographic of women ages 25–54. The pilot attracted higher ratings in subsequent weeks.

=== Reviews ===
The show resembles Desperate Housewives in many ways, including having a "pilot" that revolves around a death, according to Daily News critic David Hinckley. Hinckley states that the pilot presents each of the five main characters in a way that makes them intriguing, while tackling contemporary issues with a mix of comedy and drama. Hinckley lauded the show by saying "... a Cherry drama rises or falls on the pretty simple test of whether it’s fun, and 'Devious Maids' has the right stuff to get to there." Alessandra Stanley, the chief television critic for The New York Times, at first described the show as a "landmark" where the rich "Beverly Hills employers are mere foils for the real heroines, who are poor, Hispanic and striving: desperate housekeepers." Stanley felt that servant heroines are a bit of an overused perspective in 2013 as is the use of tongue-in-cheek humor. After describing the evolution of maid, butler and nanny roles on television, Stanley notes that this was not a show that depicts "how the other half really lives", but rather "an over-the-top dramedy".

Robert Bianco of USA Today felt the show benefited from not being picked up by ABC, where it would have been in the shadow of Desperate Housewives, and from being scheduled as summer television, where its competition was weak. Bianco believed that the various storylines were gracefully woven together in the scenes of the episode. Rob Owen of the Pittsburgh Post-Gazette described the show as a guilty pleasure. Owen stated that although the show was not original for following Desperate Housewives' path, it was good summer entertainment that managed to slip in a bit of "social satire". Mary McNamara of the Los Angeles Times panned the show's pilot, describing it as "a silly, hyperactive version of Downton Abbey", although she acknowledged that the episode had elements of The Great Gatsby (the opening murder) and West Side Story (the schoolgirl crush). San Francisco Chronicle critic David Wiegand said "the pilot episode may not break any new ground, but it's energetic and funny". He also noted that "it's a hoot the first time we see the maids get the better of their shallow, self-absorbed bosses...", but he felt that this theme might lack the depth to retain audience interest.
