= Long Day's Journey into Night (disambiguation) =

Long Day's Journey into Night is a play by Eugene O'Neill.

Long Day's Journey into Night may also refer to:

== Films ==
- Long Day's Journey into Night (1962 film), American adaptation
- Long Day's Journey into Night (1996 film), Canadian adaptation
- Long Day's Journey into Night (2018 film), Chinese film unrelated to the play
- Long Day's Journey into Night (2025 film), 2025 adaptation

== Television episodes ==
- "Long Day's Journey into Night" (ITV Sunday Night Theatre), 1973 British television adaptation
- "Long Day's Journey into Night", 1986 season 2 Growing Pains episode
- "Long Day's Journey into Night", 2014 season 2 Devious Maids episode
- "Long Day's Journey", 2003 season 4 Angel episode
