= Last Survivors =

- Theatrical release poster
- Directed by: Drew Mylrea
- Screenplay by: Josh Janowicz
- Produced by: Shaun Sanghani; Sunil Perkash; Akaash Yadav; Michael Jefferson
- Starring: Drew Van Acker; Alicia Silverstone; Stephen Moyer
- Cinematography: Julian Amaru Estrada
- Edited by: Bradley McLaughlin
- Music by: David Deutsch
- Production companies: Yadav Productions; Perkash Productions; El Ride Productions; Young at Heart Entertainment; SSS Entertainment
- Distributed by: Vertical Entertainment
- Release dates: November 4, 2021 (Leeds); January 6, 2022 (DirecTV); February 4, 2022 (United States)
- Country: United States
- Language: English

Last Survivors (formerly titled SHTF) is a 2021 American thriller film directed by Drew Mylrea in his feature directorial debut and starring Drew Van Acker, Alicia Silverstone and Stephen Moyer. It takes place in a post-apocalyptic world where for the past twenty years Troy (Stephen Moyer) has raised his now grown son, Jake (Drew Van Acker), in isolation in the woods miles away from any remnants of civilization.

== Plot ==
Troy and his son Jake have been living off the grid for over twenty years in the wake of an apocalyptic event that destroyed much of civilization and left the survivors desperate. Troy has constantly drilled Jake on the necessity of assuming any outsider is a clear and immediate danger that must be eliminated; he kills and buries anyone who happens upon them. One day an outsider shoots Troy, and Jake must leave to bring back antibiotics. He sees a woman working outside a house, but can't bring himself to kill her as his father instructed he do with anyone he encountered. He sneaks into her house to find antibiotics and steroids and returns home.

Jake hides some food to make his father think they have less than they do so he has an excuse to go hunting, and he returns to the woman's home and confronts her; she tells him her name is Henrietta. As they talk it becomes obvious to the viewer that there has been no generalized apocalyptic event.

Troy becomes suspicious of Jake, and Jake starts to doubt Troy's accounts of the state of the outside world.

== Cast ==
- Drew Van Acker as Jake
- Alicia Silverstone as Henrietta
- Stephen Moyer as Troy

== Production ==
Principal photography occurred in Butte, Montana and wrapped in January 2021.

== Reception ==
On the review aggregator website Rotten Tomatoes, 71% of 17 critics' reviews are positive.

Martin Unsworth of Starburst awarded the film 3/5 stars writing that "Last Survivors treads the well-worn path of post-apocalyptic films but manages to keep things engaging." Angie Han of The Hollywood Reporter gave the film a negative review and wrote, "it’s clearly a film with a lot on its mind (...) but its reticence keeps it from exploring the more challenging, and possibly more rewarding, paths laid out before it."

Tara McNamara of Common Sense Media rated it 4/5 star writing that "this indie isn't going to change lives, but for evening of entertainment, it'll certainly give your family something to talk about."

== See also ==
- List of thriller films of the 2020s
