= Fool's Paradise (2023 film) =

Film by Charlie Day

- Theatrical release poster
- Directed by: Charlie Day
- Written by: Charlie Day
- Produced by: John Rickard; Chris Lemole; Tim Zajaros; Alex Saks
- Starring: Charlie Day; Ken Jeong; Kate Beckinsale; Adrien Brody; Jason Sudeikis; Edie Falco; Jason Bateman; Common; Ray Liotta; John Malkovich
- Cinematography: Nico Aguilar
- Edited by: Tim Roche; Leslie Jones
- Music by: Jon Brion
- Production companies: Armory Films; Wrigley Pictures
- Distributed by: Lionsgate; Roadside Attractions
- Release date: May 12, 2023
- Running time: 97 minutes
- Country: United States
- Language: English
- Box office: $885,712

Fool's Paradise is a 2023 American satirical comedy film written and directed by Charlie Day in his directorial debut. The film stars Day, Ken Jeong, Kate Beckinsale, Adrien Brody, Jason Sudeikis, Edie Falco, Jason Bateman, Common, Ray Liotta, and John Malkovich.

The film tells the story of a down-on-his-luck publicist, who gets his lucky break when he discovers a mute man, recently released from a mental health facility, who looks just like a method actor that refuses to leave his trailer.

== Plot ==
A mute John Doe with the mental capacity of a five-year-old is ejected from a mental hospital when the state cannot afford his treatment. He begins living on the streets and taking direction from whomever he comes across. While making a biopic about Billy the Kid, a producer is incensed that method actor Sir Tom Bingsley refuses to leave his trailer. Since this costs the film time and money, the producer resorts to using a stand-in. He sees the John Doe selling oranges on the street and hires him due to the striking resemblance to Bingsley.

Meanwhile, Lenny is a struggling publicist who has not been able to maintain one client since moving to L.A. and bribes his way onto studio lots to look for talent. Lenny sees John Doe filming the biopic and misunderstands his name to be "Latte Pronto". After Bingsley dies after hanging himself as a form of a method acting, the movie is forced to continue filming with Pronto as the star. Although hindered by Pronto's lack of acting talent and his continued looks to camera, co-stars Christiana Dior and Chad Luxt are inspired by the supposed avant-garde performance and emulate his acting style.

Lenny plans to propel Pronto into stardom by getting him an agent and representation. Pronto is befriended by Chad taking him to parties and showing him the Hollywood lifestyle. Eventually infatuated with Pronto, Christiana convinces him to marry her, and she decides they should adopt three children to increase their profiles in the media. "Billy the Kid" is a success, with critics praising Pronto's unusual performance.

At the after party, Lenny asks Pronto to confirm they will never end their business relationship. When Pronto cannot respond to Lenny's request, a security guard tries to escort Lenny out for disrupting the party. A fight breaks out with Pronto being blamed and sued by the guard. Pronto's agent asks him to lay low from the media, while informing him of an offer to star in "Mosquito Boy".

While filming "Mosquito Boy", Pronto is taken out by Chad for a night on the town. Chad, who collects gold, eventually gifts Pronto a piece of gold. Paparazzo interrupts their conversation and a fight ensues, which ends with the two in jail. Despite Chad being the aggressor, Pronto is blamed in the media. His arrest further strains his relationship with his representation. While filming a stunt for "Mosquito Boy", Pronto is seriously injured, and a young stand-in is used to replace him for most of the movie. Lenny promises to publicize the film into a hit regardless. Instead, the movie fails at the box office, and Pronto's representation leaves him. Frustrated with Pronto's failing stardom and controversies, Christiana divorces him, takes the children, and begins dating Chad.

Pronto is forced to move in with Lenny, and the two bond over their mutual hardships, although Pronto remains silent. After a bad decision to book Pronto as a cuckold in a pornographic film, Lenny has a heart attack due to his excessive consumption of energy drinks. Pronto stays by his hospital bedside but is forced to leave the room when a doctor asks him for a selfie. Due to a mix-up with a nurse and a deceased patient, Pronto believes Lenny died while Lenny believes Pronto abandoned him. Lenny resolves to become a better person and successful publicist. Meanwhile, Pronto returns to living on the street. Pronto befriends Dagger, a homeless man who was formerly a famous actor, and saves his life, gaining media acclaim and the Key to the City by the Mayor.

The L.A. Mayor encourages Pronto to run for office on an anti-corporate platform since his acting career is over. However, Pronto is kidnapped by the rich Cote brothers, both oil businessmen, as they want to discourage his political career. Ed Cote threatens Pronto's life should he oppose any of the Cotes' business interests. In return for abandoning politics, Ed arranges for Pronto to get his representation back, although without Lenny, and another chance at a movie career. Disillusioned with filmmaking, Pronto abandons his new agent and wanders the streets. Much to his surprise, Lenny spots Pronto in the streets and chases after him. As they reunite, Lenny apologizes for using his friend as a meal ticket and tells Pronto he loves him. Finally managing to speak for the first time, Pronto responds, "I love you too" and gives Lenny his piece of gold that Chad had given him earlier. Shrugging off its importance, Lenny assumes the gold is fake and throws the rock in a fountain. The two depart together to enjoy dinner.

== Cast ==
- Charlie Day as Latte Pronto/Sir Tom Bingsley
- Ken Jeong as Lenny the publicist
- Kate Beckinsale as Christiana Dior
- Adrien Brody as Chad Luxt
- Jason Sudeikis as Lex Tanner
- Ray Liotta as the producer
- Steve Coulter as Tony London
- Jason Bateman as a SPFX tech
- Edie Falco as the agent
- Mary Elizabeth Ellis as makeup woman #1
- Drew Droege as a male hairdresser
- Artemis Pebdani as makeup woman #2
- Jimmi Simpson as talk show host
- Lance Barber as side kick
- Dean Norris as studio head
- Glenn Howerton as a business manager
- Common as the Dagger
- Jillian Bell as Shaman
- Katherine McNamara as Terry
- John Malkovich as Ed Cote
- Alanna Ubach as a pornography actress
- David Hornsby as a pilot
- Edy Ganem as the daughter (uncredited)

== Production ==
It was announced in September 2018 that Charlie Day was set to make his directorial debut on the film El Tonto, in addition to writing and starring in it. The additions of Kate Beckinsale, Jason Sudeikis, Edie Falco, John Malkovich and Jillian Bell to the cast were announced the following month. In October 2018, Ray Liotta (in one of his final roles), Ken Jeong, Adrien Brody, Travis Fimmel, Dean Norris and Edy Ganem were added to the cast. In November 2018, it was announced that Katherine McNamara, Common, Mary Elizabeth Ellis, and Glenn Howerton had joined the cast.

Principal photography began in October 2018 in Los Angeles. In February 2022, Day revealed in an interview that the film had undergone a week of reshoots in December 2021 with Jeong, Brody, Beckinsale, and Liotta after he wrote an additional 27 pages to the screenplay based on the advice of filmmaker Guillermo del Toro, who also suggested the film's initial title of El Tonto be discarded. The film was later retitled Fool's Paradise.

== Release ==
Fool's Paradise had its world premiere on May 9, 2023, and was released theatrically on May 12, 2023, by Roadside Attractions in the United States. Lionsgate will distribute on home media.

The film was released for digital platforms on June 2, 2023, followed by a Blu-ray and DVD release on July 18, 2023.

== Reception ==
=== Box office ===
In the United States and Canada, Fool's Paradise was released alongside Blackberry and Hypnotic. The film made $464,259 in its first weekend.

=== Critical response ===
On the review aggregator website Rotten Tomatoes, 22% of 46 critics' reviews are positive, with an average rating of 4.4/10. The website's consensus reads: "Fool's Paradise suggests Charlie Day may have a bright future as a director, but he'll need to find smarter and more consistently funny scripts." Metacritic, which uses a weighted average, assigned the film a score of 27 out of 100, based on 9 critics, indicating "generally unfavorable" reviews.

Brianna Zigler of Paste praised Day's direction and Nico Aguilar's cinematography as better-looking than most mainstream comedic films, but criticized the third act as failing to satisfyingly conclude the plot, stating that it became "clear by this point just how woefully the film falls short in demonstrating any real connection with the audience." Zigler also criticized the film for placing the "emotional heft" of the ending with Ken Jeong's character rather than Day's silent protagonist, writing that it was "interesting that Day was so obviously inspired by Chaplin yet didn’t trust his silent character enough to be the center of our compassion and understanding."
