= The Shuman Company =

Literary management company

- Company type: Private
- Industry: Film, Talent and Literary Agencies, TV
- Headquarters: Culver City, California
- Key people: Larry Shuman

The Shuman Company is a literary management company launched in 1991 by veteran manager Larry Shuman. The firm's roster includes showrunners Shawn Ryan, creator of The Shield; David Shore, creator of House; and Tim Minear. The Shuman Company is also producing the 2015 film Concussion, starring Will Smith, and the popular TV show Devious Maids.
