= Dominic Adams =

British actor and model

- Born: 17 March 1985 (age 41); Bristol, England
- Occupations: Actor, model
- Years active: 2008-present

Dominic Adams (born 17 March 1985) is a British actor and model, known for his role as Tony Bishara in the Lifetime comedy-drama Devious Maids and in Six.

== Life and career ==
Adams was born in Bristol, England on March 17, 1985, to an Iranian father and British mother, and attended the Bristol Old Vic Theatre School and Goldsmiths, University of London. In England, he appeared in a number of stage productions, and in 2008 made his screen debut in a walk-on part in film Telstar: The Joe Meek Story.

In 2014, Adams was cast as series regular for second season of Lifetime comedy-drama Devious Maids as Tony Bishara, Rebecca Wisocky's character bodyguard. In July 2014, shortly after the second-season finale aired, it was announced that Bishara would not be returning to the series for the third season.

== Filmography ==
=== Film ===
Year	Title	Role	Notes
2008	Telstar: The Joe Meek Story	Undercover Policeman	
2011	Forgetting Johnson Mayweather	Johnson (voice)	Short
2017	Girls Like Magic	Jacob	

=== Television ===
Year	Title	Role	Notes
2013	Futurestates	Miles	"The Living"
2014	Devious Maids	Tony Bishara / Amir Hassan	Main role (season 2)
2015	NCIS: Los Angeles	Kamal Pajman	"Savoir Faire"
2017–2018	Six	Michael Nasry	Main role
