= Tara Nicole Weyr =

Austrian American television director

- Occupation: Television director
- Years active: 1996–present

Tara Nicole Weyr is an Austrian-American television director. Not much is known about her life.

== Directing credits ==
- Billions
- Desperate Housewives
- Devious Maids
- Fear the Walking Dead
- The Flash
- The Good Doctor
- Lucifer
- The Night Shift
- Once Upon a Time
- Revenge
- Watson
- R.J. Decker
- S.W.A.T. Exiles
