= Joanna Adler =

American actress

Joanna P. Adler
- Education: Williams College; New York University Tisch School of the Arts
- Occupation: Actress
- Years active: 1990s–present
- Known for: Off-Broadway theatre; Devious Maids
- Awards: Obie Award (1995)

Joanna P. Adler is an American actress, known for her roles in Off-Broadway plays. She won an Obie Award in 1995. In 2014, she starred in the second season of the Lifetime television series Devious Maids.

== Life and career ==
Adler graduated from Williams College in Williamstown, Massachusetts and pursued a master's degree in Performance Studies at New York University's Tisch School of the Arts. Before completing her thesis, she began her professional acting career working with the internationally renowned theater collaborative, Mabou Mines. She continued to work in New York City's off-Broadway theater community, most notably in the title role of Richard Foreman's Obie Award-winning play Benita Canova, John Guare's Lydie Breeze, and Paul Rudnick's The Most Fabulous Story Ever Told.

In 1995, Adler won an Obie Award for Distinguished Performance by an Actress, for her role in the off-Broadway play The Boys in the Basement. She made her Broadway debut in Terrence McNally's Deuce, directed by Michael Blakemore. On television, she has guest-starred in Sex and the City, Law & Order, Law & Order: Special Victims Unit, 30 Rock, The Good Wife, and The Blacklist, and has had recurring roles on Gravity, Are We There Yet?, and Orange Is The New Black.

In December 2013, it was announced that Adler had been cast as a series regular for the second season of the Lifetime television comedy-drama series Devious Maids as Opal, a new maid who is secretive and conniving. In 2018, she appeared in FX's The Assassination of Gianni Versace: American Crime Story in a recurring role as Mary Ann Schillaci Cunanan, mother of serial killer Andrew Cunanan, who was portrayed by Darren Criss.

== Filmography ==
=== Film ===
Year	Title	Role	Notes
1993	The Five Spot	Neurotic Girl	
1996	The Proprietor	New York – F. Freemder	
1997	Ties to Rachel	Deke	
1998	A Perfect Murder	Vyczowski	
1998	Side Streets	Policewoman	
1998	The Silent Love of the Fish	The Boy	Short film
1999	Just the Ticket	Vickie	
1999	A Fish in the Bathtub	Heather	
2000	Down to You	Piercing Woman	
2000	Drop Back Ten	McCue's Bartender	
2001	Trigger Happy	Katja	
2003	The Event	Gaby	
2003	School of Rock	Summer's Mother	
2004	Book of Love	Melissa	
2004	Boutique	Cordelia	Short film
2004	My Mom and Dad	Betty	Short film
2006	Shut Up and Sing	Sheila	
2006	The Big Bad Swim	Dr. Gaskill	
2010	An Invisible Sign	Lisa's Mom	
2013	Dinner@40	Abby	Short film
2014	Revenge of the Green Dragons	Prosecutor Gwen Shore	
2014	5 Flights Up	Boy's Mother	
2014	Kill Me	Waitress	Short film
2016	Almost Paris	Lauren	
2018	Alex Strangelove	Holly Truelove	
2018	Can You Ever Forgive Me?	Arlene	
2020	An American Pickle	Professor Kim Ecklund	
2021	Tick, Tick... Boom!	Molly	

=== Television ===
Year	Title	Role	Notes
1998	Sex and the City	Syd	Episode: "Bay of Married Pigs"
2000	Cosby	Dr. Ball	Episode: "The Song Remains the Same"
2008	New Amsterdam	Tech	Episode: "Soldier's Heart"
2008	Law & Order: Criminal Intent	Anna Nobile	Episode: "Legacy"
2009	The Unusuals	Jennifer Goodman	Episode: "42"
2009	Ugly Betty	Wedding Planner	Episode: "In the Stars"
2006, 2010	Law & Order: Special Victims Unit	Sarah Gallagher / Persephone James	Episodes: "Informed" and "Savior"
2002, 2009, 2010	Law & Order	Barbara Speight / Amber Woods	Episodes: "Missing", "Great Satan" and "Love Eternal"
2010	Gravity	Sissy Rosenblum	Recurring role, 4 episodes
2010, 2011	30 Rock	Donna Straunk	Episodes: "When It Rains, It Pours" and "It's Never Too Late for Now"
2012	The Good Wife	Miss Ledger	Episode: "Don't Haze Me, Bro"
2012	Chicago Fire	Sondra Sherman	Episode: "One Minute"
2011–2012	Are We There Yet?	Mrs. Phillips	Recurring role, 9 episodes
2006–2013	The Venture Bros.	Myra Brandish (voice)	7 episodes
2013, 2015	Orange Is the New Black	Chaplain Royce	Recurring role, 4 episodes
2014	Devious Maids	Opal Sinclair	Series regular, 13 episodes
2016	The Tick	Dr. Creek	Episode: "The Tick" (pilot)
2017	The Blacklist	Kathryn Nemec	Episode: "Requiem"
2017	The Sinner	Detective Farmer	3 episodes
2018	The Assassination of Gianni Versace: American Crime Story	Mary Ann Cunanan	Recurring
2018	New Amsterdam (2018 TV series)	Faye	Episode: "Boundaries"
2019	The Resident	Dawn Long	1 episode "Flesh of the Flesh (3x02)"
2022	Billions	Alaska Faire	Episode: "Succession"
