= Maria Howell =

American actress and singer

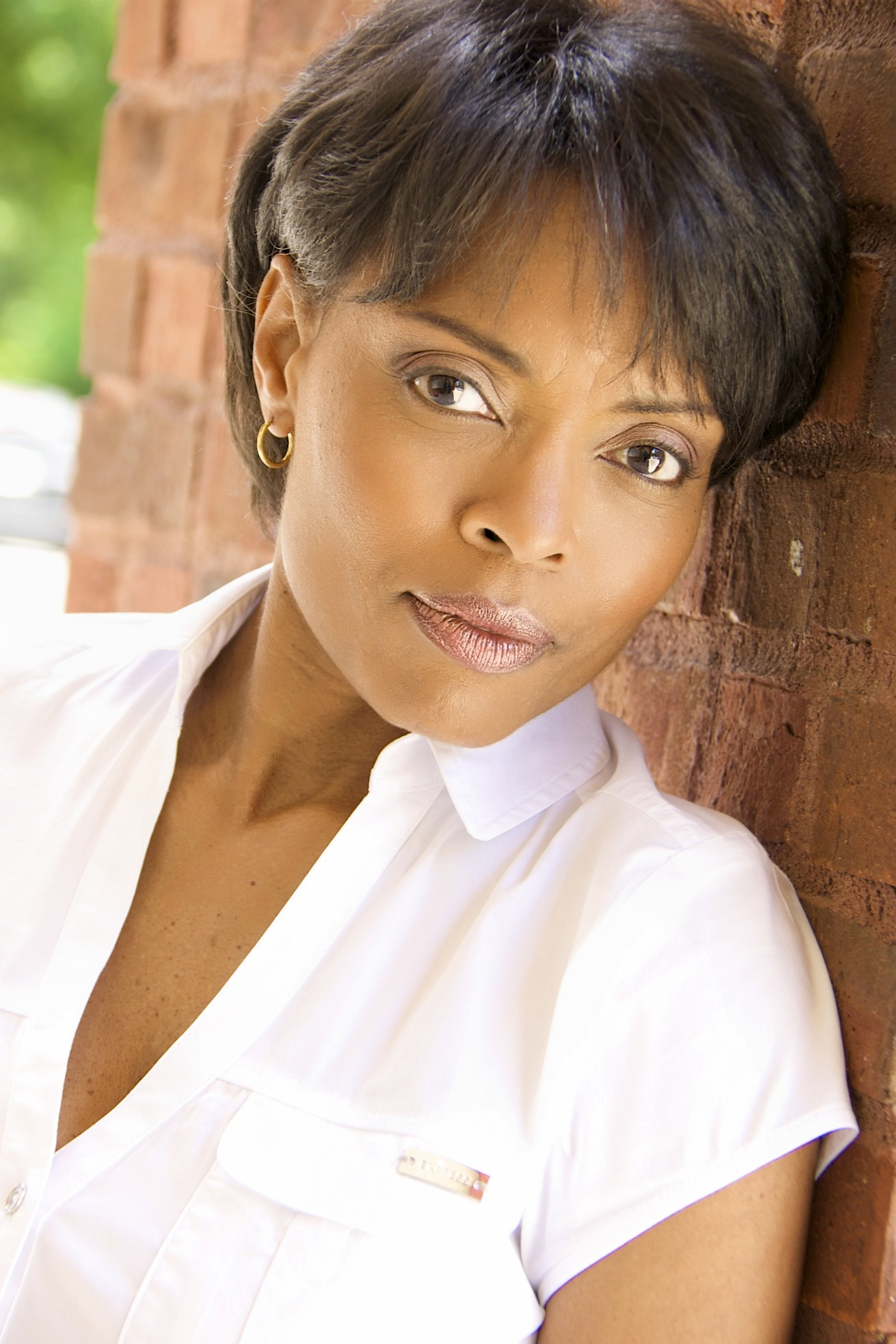
- Born: Wanda Maria Howell; Gastonia, North Carolina, U.S.
- Occupation: Actress
- Years active: 1985–present
- Website: www.mariahowell.com

Wanda Maria Howell is an American actress and singer.

== Life and career ==
Howell was born in Gastonia, North Carolina and graduated Winston-Salem State University in Winston-Salem, North Carolina. She worked as jazz singer and made her film debut in The Color Purple (1985) and later began appearing in film and television. She lived in Okinawa, Japan, from 1995–2001.

In the 2000s, Howell returned to United States and made guest appearances on television series such as Drop Dead Diva, Army Wives, The Game, Necessary Roughness, and The Vampire Diaries, and well co-starred in films include Daddy's Little Girls (2007), Mississippi Damned (2009), The Blind Side (2009), and What to Expect When You're Expecting (2012). In 2013, Howell played Seeder in The Hunger Games: Catching Fire. Also in 2012, she was cast in recurring role of NBC post-apocalyptic series Revolution as Grace Beaumont, and in 2013 played Ida Hayes in Lifetime comedy-drama Devious Maids.

From 2016 to 2018, Howell played Lt. Theresa Hawkins in the Bounce TV prime time soap opera Saints & Sinners. In 2019 she co-starred opposite Kristin Chenoweth in the Hallmark Channel Christmas film, A Christmas Love Story. In 2021 she had a recurring role in the BET+ thriller series, Sacrifice.

== Filmography ==
=== Film ===
Year	Title	Role	Notes
1985	The Color Purple	Church Choir Soloist	
1996	The Closest Thing to Heaven	Viola Holiday	
2006	Barbed Wire	Barbara	Short film
2007	Daddy's Little Girls	Wife	
2008	Reverie	Momma	Short film
2009	Mississippi Damned	Shelia Hobbs	
2009	The Blind Side	CPS Welfare Worker	
2009	A Peacock-Feathered Blue	Ms. Bean	Short film
2012	What to Expect When You're Expecting	Jules' Doctor	
2012	Little Red Wagon	Angie	
2013	The Hunger Games: Catching Fire	Seeder	
2014	Addicted	Nina	
2014	Christmas Wedding Baby	Miranda	
2014	The Good Lie	INS Agent	
2016	The Divergent Series: Allegiant	Council Member	
2016	Sons 2 the Grave	Ruth Jennings	
2016	Hidden Figures	Ms. Sumner	
2017	American Made	NSC	
2019	Homeless Ashes	Virginia	
2022	Gigi & Nate	Chairman Filling	
2024	Summer Camp	Judy	

=== Television ===
Year	Title	Role	Notes
1993	The Young Indiana Jones Chronicles	Goldie	2 episodes
1993	Linda	Shirley	TV film
1993	Scattered Dreams	Elsa	TV film
1995	American Gothic	Choir Soloist	Episode: "Eye of the Beholder"
2007	K-Ville	Loretta Sweeney	Episode: "Flood, Wind, and Fire"
2008	Living Proof	Kate	TV film
2008	Army Wives	Counselor	Episode: "Thank You for Letting Me Share"
2009	Army Wives	Major Barcenilla	Episode: "Fields of Fire"
2009	Drop Dead Diva	Hilda Carrera	Episode: "The Dress"
2009–2017	The Vampire Diaries	Mrs. Halpern, Ayana Bennett	3 episodes
2010	Past Life	Mrs. Connors	Episode: "Regressing Henry"
2010	Detroit 1-8-7	Woman Accident Witness	Episode: "Pharmacy Double/Bullet Train"
2011	The Game	Valencia	Episode: "The Right to Choose Episode"
2011	Field of Vision	Lucy's Teacher	TV film
2011	Necessary Roughness	Joanne Huff	Episode: "Pilot"
2011	Single Ladies	Nurse	Episode: "Take Me to the Next Phase"
2011	It's Supernatural	Barren Woman	Episode: "Bill Ligon"
2012	Firelight	Mrs. Easle	TV film
2012–2014	Revolution	Grace Beaumont	Recurring role, 10 episodes
2013	Devious Maids	Ida Hayes	Recurring role, 8 episodes
2016–2018	Saints & Sinners	Lt. Theresa Hawkins	Recurring role, 15 episodes
2017	The Haves and the Have Nots	Melissa’s mother	2 episodes
2017	Criminal Minds	Dr. Lode Barren	1 episodes
2019	A Christmas Love Story	Carol	
2021	Delilah	Adora	Episode: "The Long Game"
2021–present	Little Ellen	Tallulah (voice)	Recurring role
2021	The Resident	Judge Lola Rawlins	Episode: "Past, Present, Future"
2021	Sacrifice	Estelle Winchester	Recurring role, 7 episodes
2022	To Her, with Love	Maya	
2024	Christmas in the Friendly Skies	Rochelle	TV Movie
2025-present	Beyond the Gates	Tracy Tyler	Recurring role

=== Video games ===
Year	Title	Role
2017	Minecraft: Story Mode	Tripwire
2020	Maneater	Female Hunter
