= Mark Deklin =

American actor and fight coordinator

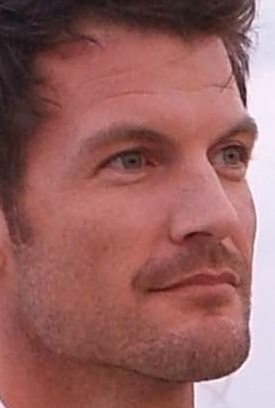
- Deklin in 2008
- Born: December 3, 1967 (age 58); Pittsburgh, Pennsylvania, U.S.
- Education: Pennsylvania State University, University Park (BA); University of Washington, Seattle (MFA)
- Occupations: Actor; fight coordinator
- Years active: 1994–present
- Spouse: Jamie Deklin (m. 2006)
- Children: 2

Mark Deklin (born December 3, 1967) is an American actor and fight coordinator. He starred in the Fox primetime drama Lone Star, the ABC comedy-drama GCB, the Lifetime comedy-drama Devious Maids, and in 2017 joined the ABC political drama Designated Survivor as Senator Jack Bowman. He voiced Deimos in the video game God of War: Ghost of Sparta. He also was the voice of Warden in the video game Tom Clancy's Rainbow Six Siege.

== Early life and education ==
Deklin was born on December 3, 1967, in Pittsburgh, Pennsylvania. He graduated from Thomas Jefferson High School in 1986. He holds a B.A. in English and History from the Pennsylvania State University, an M.F.A. in acting from the University of Washington in Seattle, and is a certified member of the Society of American Fight Directors.

== Career ==
A classically trained stage actor, Deklin has worked extensively on Broadway and off-Broadway. On television, he has had recurring roles as Dr. Matthew Shaw in the Fox series Justice from 2006 to 2007, as Elliott Mayer in the CBS sitcom The Ex List in 2008, as Stan Edwards in the CBS drama Hawaii Five-O from 2011 to 2012, as Joe Nazario in the NBC police drama Shades of Blue in 2015, as Agent Cameron Davies in the TNT series Rizzoli & Isles in 2016, as Dr. William Landon in the TNT procedural Major Crimes in 2017, and as Roy in the Netflix comedy Grace and Frankie from 2018 to 2019. He has also had voice roles in several video games, including Call of Duty 3, Metal Gear Solid: Peace Walker, God of War: Ghost of Sparta, and Halo Wars 2, and co-starred in the films Riverworld, Tarzan, The Wish List, Tides of War, The Wedding Chapel, Never Say Macbeth, Switched for Christmas, The Answer, and Mini's First Time.

Deklin starred in the Fox primetime drama Lone Star as Trammell Thatcher, the ABC soapy comedy GCB as Blake Reilly, and the Lifetime comedy-drama Devious Maids as Nicholas Deering. He has also had a number of guest-starring roles in television series, including Sex and the City, Charmed, Frasier, CSI: Crime Scene Investigation, Desperate Housewives, Nip/Tuck, Two and a Half Men, Life on Mars, The Mentalist, Warehouse 13, Hot in Cleveland, Big Love, Major Crimes, Castle, Criminal Minds, and The Blacklist.

== Filmography ==
Film roles
Year	Title	Role
2005	Herbie: Fully Loaded	ESPN reporter
2006	Mini's First Time	Ian Boyd
2007	Never Say Macbeth	Scott
2013	Tarzan	John Greystoke (voice)
2014	The Answer	Cole, Sr.

Television roles
Year	Title	Role	Notes
1999	Guiding Light	Joe	2 episodes
2000	Ed	Dr. Scott Benson	Episode: "The Whole Truth"
2002	Sex and the City	Ship Officer Matt Cook	Episode: "Anchors Away"
2004	Charmed	Bosk	Episode: "I Dream of Phoebe"
2004	Frasier	Clint	2 episodes
2004	One on One	Helmut	Episode: "The Play's the Thing"
2005	Tides of War	Captain Galasso	Television film
2005	CSI: Miami	Russell Edge	Episode: "Sex & Taxes"
2005	Hot Properties	Hunk	Episode: "When Chloe Met Marco"
2006	CSI: NY	Rick Smith	Episode: "Stuck on You"
2006	Las Vegas	Jeff McKee	Episode: "Fidelity, Security, Delivery"
2006–2007	Justice	Dr. Matthew Shaw	7 episodes
2006–2007	Desperate Housewives	Bill Pearce	2 episodes
2007	Shark	Peter Rhodes	Episode: "Burning Sensation"
2008–2009	The Ex List	Elliott Mayer	5 episodes
2009	Big Love	Matt	Episode: "Prom Queen"
2009	Life on Mars	Ronald Harris	Episode: "Coffee, Tea, or Annie"
2009	Better Off Ted	Mordor	2 episodes
2009	Nip/Tuck	Skip Pierce	Episode: "Lola Wlodkowski"
2010	Two and a Half Men	Marcus	Episode: "Crude and Uncalled For"
2010	The Mentalist	James Kinsey	Episode: "Redline"
2010	Riverworld	Sam Clemens	miniseries
2010	Romantically Challenged	Doug	Episode: "Don't Be Yourself"
2010	The Wish List	Dr. Erik Cavallieri	Television film
2010	Lone Star	Trammell Thatcher	Main role
2011–2012	Hawaii Five-0	Stan Edwards	3 episodes
2011	Hot in Cleveland	Kirk Stark	2 episodes
2012	GCB	Blake Reilly	Main role
2013	Castle	Corey Francis / Noah Kesswood	Episode: "Significant Others"
2013	The Wedding Chapel	Roger Waters	Television film
2013	CSI: Crime Scene Investigation	Ryan Miller	Episode: "Torch Song"
2014	Devious Maids	Nicholas Deering	Main role (season 2)
2014	Warehouse 13	Ted	Episode: "Secret Services"
2015	Criminal Minds	Patrick Jon Murphy	Episode: "Breath Play"
2016	Shades of Blue	Joe Nazario	2 episodes
2016	Rizzoli & Isles	FBI Special Agent Cameron Davies	2 episodes
2017	Designated Survivor	Senator Jack Bowman	5 episodes
2017	Elementary	Jake Bozeman	Episode: "Moving Targets"
2017	Switched for Christmas	Greg Turner	Television film
2017	Major Crimes	Dr. William Landon	4 episodes
2018–2019	Grace and Frankie	Roy	4 episodes
2018	Christmas in Evergreen: Letters to Santa	Kevin Miller	Television film
2019	Blindspot	J.B. Kelly	Episode: "The One Where Jane Visits an Old Friend"
2019	The Code	Commander Noah Hewitt	2 episodes
2019	Younger	Cameron	Episode: "Stiff Competition"
2019	Love and Sunshine	Jake Terry	Television film
2019	The Blacklist	Gov. Richard Sweeney	Episode: "Hannah Hayes (No. 125)"
2019	Christmas in Evergreen: Tidings of Joy	Kevin Miller	Television film
2020	Blue Bloods	Donnie Hassett	2 episodes
2020	Meet Me at Christmas	Beau	Television film
2021	Sister Swap: A Hometown Holiday	Eric Baker	Television film
2023	Glamorous	James	

=== Video games ===
Year	Title	Role	Notes
2006	Call of Duty 3	Maj. Gerald Ingram	
2010	God of War: Ghost of Sparta	Deimos	
2016	Mafia III	Additional voices	
2017	Halo Wars 2	Jerome-092	
2018	Red Dead Redemption 2	O'Driscolls Gang	
2019	Tom Clancy's Rainbow Six: Siege	Warden	Operation Phantom Sight
2025	Call of Duty: Black Ops 7	The Warden	
