= Devious Maids =

American television series

- Genre: Comedy drama; Mystery; Soap opera
- Created by: Marc Cherry
- Based on: Ellas son... la alegría del hogar by Eugenio Derbez
- Starring: Ana Ortiz; Dania Ramirez; Roselyn Sánchez; Judy Reyes; Edy Ganem; Rebecca Wisocky; Tom Irwin; Brianna Brown; Brett Cullen; Matt Cedeno; Mariana Klaveno; Grant Show; Drew Van Acker; Wolé Parks; Susan Lucci; Mark Deklin; Joanna P. Adler; Dominic Adams; Valerie Mahaffey; Colin Woodell; Gilles Marini; Cristián de la Fuente; Nathan Owens; Sol Rodríguez
- Composer: Edward Shearmur
- Country of origin: United States
- Original language: English
- No. of seasons: 4
- No. of episodes: 49 (list of episodes)

Production
- Executive producers: David Lonner; Eva Longoria; John Mass; Larry Shuman; Marc Cherry; Michael Garcia; Paul McGuigan; Paul Presburger; Sabrina Wind; Brian Tanen; Curtis Kheel
- Producers: Justin Lillehei (assoc.); Brian Tanen; David Warren
- Production locations: Atlanta, Georgia (Filming); Beverly Hills, California (Setting)
- Cinematography: Oliver Bokelberg
- Running time: 43 minutes
- Production companies: ABC Studios; Cherry/Wind Productions; Televisa Internacional

Original release
- Network: Lifetime
- Release: June 23, 2013 – August 8, 2016

Related
- Desperate Housewives

Devious Maids is an American comedy-drama and mystery television series created by Marc Cherry, produced by ABC Studios, and executive produced by Cherry, Sabrina Wind, Eva Longoria, Paul McGuigan, Larry Shuman, David Lonner, John Mass, Paul Presburger, and Michael Garcia. It is based on the Mexican series Ellas son... la alegría del hogar created by Eugenio Derbez. It originally aired on Lifetime for four seasons from June 23, 2013, to August 8, 2016.

Set in Beverly Hills, California, Devious Maids followed the lives of four Latina maids working for the area's wealthiest and most powerful families. The series featured an ensemble cast led by Ana Ortiz as Marisol Suarez, Dania Ramirez as Rosie Falta, Roselyn Sánchez as Carmen Luna, and Judy Reyes as Zoila Diaz. While working for Beverly Hills' most glamorous and powerful citizens, the maids are exposed to and often a part of secrets, mysteries and crimes hidden behind their employers' wealthy facade as well as the closed doors of their homes. Edy Ganem, Susan Lucci, Rebecca Wisocky, Tom Irwin, Brianna Brown, Brett Cullen, Grant Show, Drew Van Acker, and Nathan Owens feature in supporting roles throughout the series.

The series was originally in development to air on ABC, but was ultimately picked up by Lifetime. The first season was the subject of positive reviews from television critics. In September 2016, Lifetime announced that they were cancelling Devious Maids after four seasons, leaving the series to conclude on an unresolved cliffhanger. Despite online petitions from viewers who campaigned for the series to continue on another network or streaming service, it was confirmed that Devious Maids would not continue as options with the cast had expired.

== Premise ==
The first season premiered on June 23, 2013, and introduces the four central characters of the show: Marisol Duarte (Ana Ortiz), Rosie Falta (Dania Ramirez), Carmen Luna (Roselyn Sanchez) and Zoila Diaz (Judy Reyes), as well as their rich employers in the town of Beverly Hills. The main mystery of the season is the sudden murder of fellow maid Flora Hernandez (Paula Garces), and the involvement of her employers Evelyn (Rebecca Wisocky) and Adrian Powell (Tom Irwin) in the events leading up to it. Once an English professor, Marisol takes a job as Taylor (Brianna Brown) and Michael Stappord's (Brett Cullen) maid in order to get close to Flora's old friends and prove her son's (Eddie Hassell) innocence of the crime; Rosie works for actors Peri (Mariana Klaveno) and Spence Westmore (Grant Show), though eventually enters into an affair with the latter; Carmen takes a job for singer Alejandro Rubio (Matt Cedeño) in hopes of him making her a star while dodging the feelings of her co-worker, Sam (Wolé Parks); and Zoila tries to prevent her daughter Valentina (Edy Ganem) from being with her boss Genevieve Delatour's (Susan Lucci) son, Remi (Drew Van Acker).

The second season premiered on April 20, 2014, and its central mystery is that of Marisol's new fiancé Nicholas Deering (Mark Deklin), his mysterious maid Opal (Joanna P. Adler), and a fifteen-year-old secret. While Marisol works to solve the mystery of her new lover, Rosie takes on a new lover as well - Reggie (Reggie Austin) - while working for his family, but works to expose him once learning he's embezzling his uncle's (Willie C. Carpenter) money. Carmen briefly acts as Alejandro's fiancé when word gets out that he's gay, but his sudden assassination leads to her taking a job working for Spence, who has lost both Peri and Rosie. Spence's nephew Ty (Gideon Glick) later comes for an extended visit and develops an unhealthy obsession for Carmen. Zoila finally gives Valentina her space, but only after her husband Pablo (Alex Fernandez) leaves her. She soon takes on new lover Javier (Ivan Hernandez), while Valentina goes to work for the Powells and takes on new lover Ethan (Colin Woodell), who secretly takes part in a gang of teens who go around robbing houses. Due to one of these robberies, Adrian is left shaken and hires bodyguard Tony Bishara (Dominic Adams) who Evelyn has an affair with. Meanwhile, Remi fights to win back Valentina, and his mother Genevieve learns that she's in need of a kidney transplant.

The third season premiered on June 1, 2015, and its central mystery revolves around the return of the Stappords, what they're hiding, and if it relates to the respective deaths of tennis pro Louie Becker (Eddie Mills) and later maid Blanca Alvarez (Naya Rivera). Four months since Ty's drive-by shooting and Rosie wakes up from a coma, but she's unable to enjoy married life with Spence due to the return of her supposedly deceased husband, Ernesto (Cristián de la Fuente). She later goes to work as the Stappords' new maid and unveils what they're hiding with the help of Marisol, who in the meantime has become a best-selling author and decided to open a placement agency for maids, leading her to finding love in young male-maid Jesse Morgan (Nathan Owens). Carmen finds work at the Powells and briefly acts as Adrian's dominatrix, while also continuing her affair with married man Sebastien Dussault (Gilles Marini) whose wife (Michelle Hurd) she hopes can make her into a star. Zoila's relationship with Javier ends when she lies about him being the father of her unborn child, and her friendship with Genevieve falls apart due to her boss' new love, Dr. Neff (John O'Hurley). Meanwhile, a now engaged Valentina and Remi move to New York, and the Powells take in foster son, Deion (Issac Ryan Brown).

The fourth and final season premiered on June 6, 2016, and its main mystery is the sudden murder of Peri Westmore, and the involvement of a cult known as "The Circle" in the events leading up to it. Rosie takes charge in the investigation when Spence is wrongly incarcerated for the crime while she is also working two jobs, one as Genevieve's new maid and the other as Peri and Spence's son's (Carter Birchwell) nanny when Peri's sister Shannon (Katherine LaNasa) gets custody of him. Zoila has permanently quit being Genevieve's maid following the loss of her child when in labor, but due to the absence of her new employer (Kate Beahan) she's able to masquerade as a Beverly Hills' socialite and land a new man - Kyle (Ryan McPartlin) - who has an extremely close bond with his mother (Stephanie Faracy), the secret leader of "The Circle". Marisol's book is in the process of being made into a movie which leads her into the arms of studio head Peter Hudson (James Denton), but continues to have lingering feelings for Jesse, who has a fling with Danni (Sol Rodríguez), Carmen's daughter that she gave away at birth and now is starting to build a relationship with. Meanwhile, Adrian goes to great lengths to try and win back Evelyn, who's moved in with and began working for Marisol, on her journey to getting a divorce.

Following the show's cancellation, executive producer Curtis Kheel revealed the answers to the show's cliffhangers and where the characters would have gone.

== Cast and characters ==
=== Main ===
- Ana Ortiz as Marisol Suarez, a former professor who goes undercover as a maid to prove her son's innocence of murder
- Dania Ramirez as Rosie Falta, the maid of Peri and Spence Westmore, and an undocumented immigrant
- Roselyn Sanchez as Carmen Luna, the maid of Alejandro Rubio, and an aspiring singer
- Judy Reyes as Zoila Diaz, the maid of Genevieve Delatour and mother of Valentina
- Edy Ganem as Valentina Diaz (main, seasons 1–2; recurring, season 3), Zoila's daughter and the second maid of Genevieve Delatour, who has a crush on her boss' son Remi
- Rebecca Wisocky as Evelyn Powell, Adrian's cold and mysterious wife, employer of recently murdered maid Flora Hernandez
- Tom Irwin as Adrian Powell, Evelyn's sinister husband who had an affair with the recently murdered maid
- Brianna Brown as Taylor Stappord (main, season 1 and 3; guest, season 2), Marisol's boss, and Michael's new wife
- Brett Cullen as Michael Stappord (seasons 1 and 3), Marisol's boss, a lawyer and newlywed to Taylor
- Mariana Klaveno as Peri Westmore (main, season 1; guest, seasons 2-4), Rosie's boss, a budding film actress and Spence's wife
- Grant Show as Spence Westmore, Rosie's boss, a soap opera star and Peri's husband
- Drew Van Acker as Remi Delatour (main, seasons 1–2; recurring, season 3), Genevieve's son who moves home to care for his mother, and whom Valentina develops feelings for
- Wolé Parks as Sam Alexander (season 1), Alejandro's butler, who has a crush on Carmen
- Susan Lucci as Genevieve Delatour, Zoila and Valentina's airhead boss
- Mark Deklin as Nicholas Deering (season 2), Marisol's fiancé and later husband, who has a history with the Powells
- Joanna P. Adler as Opal Sinclair (season 2), Nicholas' mysterious maid with a grudge against Marisol
- Dominic Adams as Tony Bishara (season 2), the Powells' bodyguard who has an affair with Evelyn
- Colin Woodell as Ethan Sinclair (season 2), Opal's son and local poolboy
- Gilles Marini as Sebastien Dussault (main, season 3; guest, season 2), a married realtor who has an affair with Carmen
- Cristián de la Fuente as Ernesto Falta (season 3), Rosie's first husband who she believed to be dead
- Nathan Owens as Jesse Morgan (seasons 3–4), a male maid for Marisol's placement agency and later a personal trainer
- Sol Rodriguez as Daniela Mercado (season 4), Carmen's daughter and an aspiring singer

=== Recurring ===
- Paula Garcés as Flora Hernandez (season 1), the recently murdered maid of Evelyn and Adrian Powell
- Matt Cedeño as Alejandro Rubio (seasons 1–2), Carmen's boss, a famous pop singer
- Eddie Hassell as Eddie Suarez (season 1), Marisol's son, framed for Flora's murder
- Melinda Page Hamilton as Odessa Burakov (seasons 1–2), Alejandro's house-manager
- Valerie Mahaffey as Olivia Rice (seasons 1 and 3), Michael's unstable ex-wife
- Maria Howell as Ida Hayes (season 1), Marisol's attorney
- Alex Fernandez as Pablo Diaz (seasons 1–3), Zoila's husband
- Stephen Collins as Philippe Delatour (season 1), Genevieve's ex-husband and Remi's father
- Octavio Westwood (seasons 1-2) and Alejandro Vera (seasons 3-4) as Miguel Falta, Rosie's son
- Reggie Austin as Reggie Miller (season 2), Rosie's immigration lawyer
- Willie C. Carpenter as Kenneth Miller (season 2), Rosie's paraplegic boss, husband of Didi and father of Lucinda
- Gideon Glick as Ty McKay (season 2), Spence's mentally disturbed nephew, part of a gang of robbers in Beverly Hills
- Kimberly Hebert Gregory as Lucinda Miller (season 2), Kenneth's estranged daughter, an artist
- Tiffany Hines as Didi Miller (season 2), Kenneth's second wife, a former stripper
- Ivan Hernandez as Javier Mendoza (seasons 2–3), a professional chef who engages with Zoila after her separation from Pablo
- Julie Claire as Gail Fleming (seasons 3–4), a Beverly Hills socialite and frienemy of Marisol and Evelyn
- Grecia Merino as Katy Stappord (season 3), Taylor and Michael's adopted daughter with a mysterious past
- John O'Hurley as Christopher Neff (season 3), Genevieve's doctor who confesses his love to her following her kidney transplant
- James Denton as Peter Hudson (season 4), head of the studio producing the film adaptation of Marisol's book
- Ryan McPartlin as Kyle (season 4), Zoila's new neighbor with an uncomfortably close relationship with his mother
- Carlos Ponce as Benjamin Pacheco (season 4), Peri's associate and a member of The Circle
- Stephanie Faracy as Frances (season 4), Kyle's mother and the leader of The Circle

== Episodes ==
Season	Episodes	Originally released	
Season	Episodes	First released	Last released
1	13	June 23, 2013	September 22, 2013
2	13	April 20, 2014	July 13, 2014
3	13	June 1, 2015	August 24, 2015
4	10	June 6, 2016	August 8, 2016

== Production ==
=== Development ===
The plot is based on the Mexican TV series Ellas son... la Alegría del Hogar, which translates in English as "They Are... the Joy of the Home" and was heavily influenced by Cherry's previous series Desperate Housewives. The Mexican series is based on an original concept by Gloria Calzada, Juan Meyer, and Salvador Rizo. The American adaptation was to follow four maids with ambition and dreams of their own while they work for the rich and famous in Beverly Hills, California. ABC ordered the pilot on January 31, 2012. Actress Eva Longoria was announced as an executive producer on March 26. She had worked previously with Cherry on Desperate Housewives, and was hired to add perspective to the Latina roles. ABC Studios gave Cherry permission to start making senior staffing offers for the show on May 1, which was perceived as an indication that the show would be picked up.

On May 14, 2012, the pilot was not picked up by ABC for the 2012–13 United States network schedule. However, on June 22, 2012, Lifetime picked up the pilot with a thirteen-episode order. In May 2012, Roselyn Sánchez made a cameo appearance in the final episode of Desperate Housewives, "Finishing the Hat", as her character Carmen Luna.

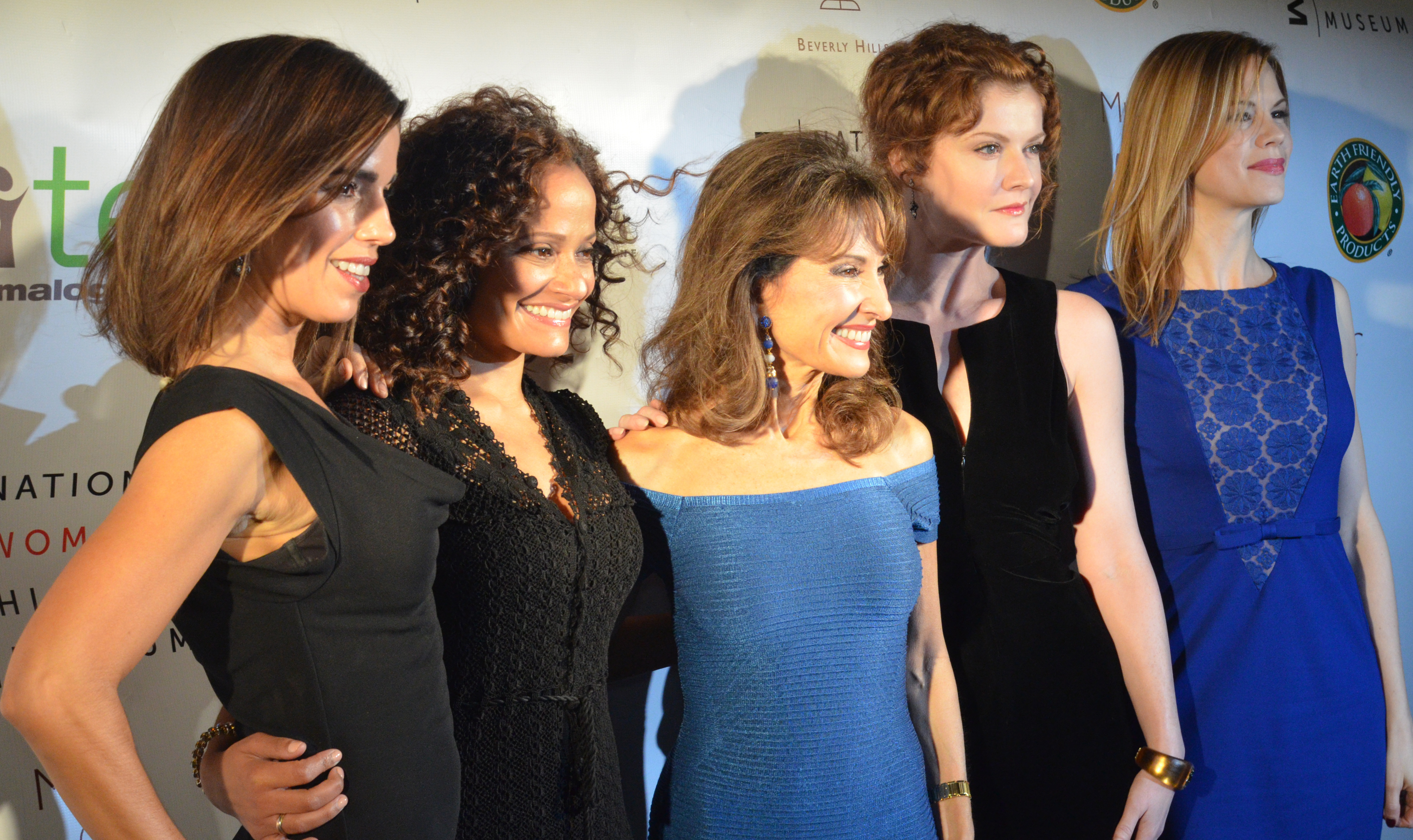
Ana Ortiz, Judy Reyes, Susan Lucci, Rebecca Wisocky, and Mariana Klaveno at an event in October 2013

After a series of constant cliffhangers and ongoing drama, the season 1 finale became its highest-rated episode, with 3 million viewers. Season 2, on the other hand, averaged 1.8 million total viewers per episode. The premiere episode of season 3 drew in 1.5 million viewers.

=== Casting ===
Dania Ramirez was the first lead cast member to be cast, being announced on February 15. Ana Ortiz joined the cast as the central character on February 17. On February 23, both Sanchez and Judy Reyes were added to the cast. When Edy Ganem was announced in the cast on March 2 the show was still described as centering on the other four maids (Ortiz, Reyes, Sanchez, and Ramirez; Ortiz's character was later changed to a professor who posed as a maid).

Rebecca Wisocky joined the cast on February 23. Most of the other supporting roles were filled in during March: Brianna Brown (March 6); Susan Lucci, Drew Van Acker and Brett Cullen (all March 9); Mariana Klaveno and Grant Show (both March 12); and Tom Irwin (March 16).

After the pilot episode was picked to series by Lifetime, Wolé Parks was added to the cast in a regular role on November 21. Melinda Page Hamilton and Matt Cedeño were added to the cast in recurring roles with the promise of promotion if the show got picked up for a second season on November 26. Both were expected to appear in the pilot episode. Valerie Mahaffey also made cameo in pilot, and later had recurring role as Olivia Rice. Several actors from Desperate Housewives had roles in Devious Maids. Richard Burgi, Andrea Parker, Jolie Jenkins, Patrika Darbo, Dakin Matthews, Liz Torres who previously appeared in Desperate Housewives, have guest roles in this series.

For the second season, four new series regular actors were added for the show. Wolé Parks and Brett Cullen did not return for the second season, while Brianna Brown made a guest-appearance. Mariana Klaveno was reduced to recurring status in the second season. Stage actress Joanna P. Adler was cast in main role of a new mystery maid, Opal, in December 2013. Newcomer Dominic Adams was cast as Tony, the bodyguard, and Colin Woodell was cast as his son, Ethan Sinclair. Mark Deklin joined the cast as Nicholas Deering, Marisol's new love interest. Tricia O'Kelley joined the cast in the recurring role of Tanya.

For the third season, Gilles Marini was upped to series regular after appearing in the season two finale. Season one star Brianna Brown was announced to make her return to the series for its third season, as a series regular, with Brett Cullen also returning to play her husband. Valerie Mahaffey recurred as Olivia Rice for a few episodes. In February 2015, it was reported that Glee actress Naya Rivera had joined the season in the recurring role of Blanca; a maid to a seemingly ideal family, who learns of a life altering secret. Later that month, Days of Our Lives actor Nathan Owens was cast in the regular role of Jesse, a recently returned home military man. Cristián de la Fuente was also cast as a series regular in the role of Rosie's long-lost husband, Ernesto Falta, who had been believed to be dead. Actor Alec Mapa announced on a tweet in February his debut on the show in the recurring role of Jerry. In April 2015, it was reported the previous regulars Drew Van Acker and Edy Ganem (who had previously been one of the central characters, on the show) were demoted to recurring roles for the third season. They both appeared in the first two episodes of the season and then departed as their characters left for New York.

For the fourth season, filming started January 14, 2016 and episode titles will be cleaning puns. Brianna Brown, Brett Cullen, and Gilles Marini will not return as series regulars. In January 2016, it was announced the executive producer Eva Longoria would guest star in season 4 while Longoria's former Desperate Housewives costar James Denton had been tapped for the recurring role of Peter. Ryan McPartlin will make a debut this season by playing Kyle who is a sweet, sexy — and, most importantly, filthy rich — newcomer who falls for one of the core maids. However, he has an unusually close relationship with his mother, Frances who is played by Stephanie Faracy. Also, Julie Claire who was recurring as Gail Fleming in Season 3 will return in Season 4. In early February, Carlos Ponce was announced to play Ben who is the manager of a famous movie star, but also a dangerous-yet-handsome thirty-something who specializes in manipulating people. He's also described as charming and mysterious. Carter Birchwell was assigned to play Spence and Peri's son Tucker. Katherine LaNasa will play Shannon Greene, Peri's older sister. In addition, Argentinian actress Sol Rodríguez would recur as Daniela while Nathan Owens has been promoted as a series regular.

=== Filming ===
The pilot episode for ABC was filmed in Los Angeles. After Lifetime picked Devious Maids to series, filming moved to Atlanta, Georgia. The pilot episode was directed by Paul McGuigan. The finale aired on August 8, 2016.

== Reception ==
Devious Maids was well received by critics upon release.

The review aggregator Rotten Tomatoes reported an approval rating for the first season of 72% based on 29 critic reviews, with an average rating of 6.8/10. The website's critical consensus states, "While Devious Maids might be predictable and reminiscent of some other Mark Cherry shows, it flaunts a talented cast and a strong structure." Metacritic calculated a weighted average score of 63 out of 100 based on 21 critics, indicating "generally favorable reviews".

Emily Yahr of The Washington Post wrote, "Devious Maids involves a complicated web of characters and hooks viewers immediately with a murder mystery."

== Awards and nominations ==
Year	Award	Category	Recipients and nominees	Outcome
2014	NAMIC Vision Awards	Comedy	Devious Maids	Nominated
2014	Imagen Awards	Best Actress - Television	Ana Ortiz	Won
2014	Imagen Awards	Best Actress - Television	Dania Ramirez	Nominated
2014	Imagen Awards	Best Actress - Television	Judy Reyes	Nominated
2014	Imagen Awards	Best Actress - Television	Roselyn Sánchez	Nominated
2014	Imagen Awards	Best Actress - Television	Edy Ganem	Nominated
2015	Prism Awards	Drama Series Episode - Substance Use	"You Can't Take It With You"	Nominated
2015	Imagen Awards	Best Actress - Television	Ana Ortiz	Nominated
2015	Imagen Awards	Best Actress - Television	Dania Ramirez	Nominated
2015	Imagen Awards	Best Actress - Television	Judy Reyes	Nominated
2015	Imagen Awards	Best Actress - Television	Roselyn Sánchez	Nominated
