= Wolé Parks =

American actor

- Born: July 27, 1982 (age 44); New York City, New York, U.S.
- Education: New York University
- Occupation: Actor
- Years active: 2002–present
- Known for: As the World Turns; Devious Maids; Superman & Lois

Wolé Parks (born July 27, 1982) is an American actor, best known for his roles as Dallas Griffin in the CBS daytime soap opera As the World Turns, and as Sam Alexander in the Lifetime comedy-drama series Devious Maids. He appeared in the 8th season of The Vampire Diaries, playing the role of 'Cade' and portrays John Henry Irons in Superman & Lois.

== Early life and education ==
Parks was born in New York City, to a Belizean mother named Lilith Parks and a Tanzanian father whom he did not meet until he was an adult. He is a graduate of New York University with a B.F.A. in Fine Arts and a B.A. in Mathematics.

== Career ==
He first joined the cast of the CBS soap opera As the World Turns on November 14, 2007, taking over the role of Dallas Griffin.

Parks guest-starred in Law & Order, its spin-off Law & Order: Criminal Intent and Gossip Girl, as well as starring in the sixth season of MTV's anthology series Undressed. In film, Parks was seen alongside Kevin Bacon in the HBO telefilm Taking Chance and with Joseph Gordon-Levitt in the 2012 film Premium Rush. In 2013, he has series regular role in the Lifetime comedy-drama Devious Maids. In the final season of The Vampire Diaries, Parks had a recurring role as Arcadius.

In May 2020, Parks was cast as "The Stranger" in the CW superhero drama television series Superman & Lois, later revealed to be John Henry Irons from an unidentified Earth where his Superman became evil.

== Personal life ==
Parks is an active volunteer with School on Wheels and has been tutoring students in mathematics since 2013. He is also heavily involved with AIDS/LifeCycle, a seven-day cycling tour through California to raise money in support of the fight against HIV/AIDS.

=== Driving accident ===
In 2006, at the age of 23, Parks accidentally killed a 25-year old graduate student while driving with a suspended license. On the evening of January 22, Parks was charged with leaving the scene of an accident. The Assistant District Attorney concluded that Parks "had the green light, was not speeding, committed no traffic infractions and did not appear intoxicated." Four hours later, Parks showed up at the 94th Precinct in Brooklyn to turn himself in. Following a lengthy investigation, Parks later pleaded guilty to a misdemeanor count of leaving the scene of an accident after causing physical injury, and received one year of probation, 250 hours of community service, and counseling.

== Filmography ==
Year	Title	Role	Notes
2002	Undressed	Brett	Season 6
2003	Polaroid	Michael	Short film
2007	Law & Order	Thomas Ryland	Episode: "Bling"
2007–2008	As the World Turns	Dallas Griffin	Series regular
2009	Taking Chance	Major Schott	TV movie
2009	Law & Order: Criminal Intent	A.D.A. Damon Whitney	Episode: "Identity Crisis"
2009	Gossip Girl	Staffer	Episode: "They Shoot Humphreys, Don't They?"
2009	Law & Order	Sergeant Elias	Episode: "Shotgun"
2010	The Town	Boston police Sergeant Ryan	
2012	Next Caller	Keith Calhoun	Series regular, 4 episodes, unaired series
2012	Premium Rush	Manny	
2013	Devious Maids	Sam Alexander	Series regular, 9 episodes
2013	NCIS	Navy Captain Michael Laramie	Episode: "Under the Radar"
2014	Half the Perfect World	Ralph	
2016–2017	The Vampire Diaries	Arcadius "Cade"	Recurring role
2017	Superstore	Scott (Construction worker)	Season 3: episode 3 - Part-Time Hirers
2018	9-1-1	Michael Grant's Boyfriend	Episode: "Next of Kin"
2019	All American	Micah Richards	Recurring role (season 1-2)
2019	Yellowstone	Torry	Recurring role (season 2)
2020	Law & Order: Special Victims Unit	Markeevious Ryan	Episode: She Paints For Vengeance
2021–2024	Superman & Lois	John Henry Irons	Series regular (season 1-4); 46 episodes
2024	The Lincoln Lawyer	David Henry Lyons	Recurring role (season 3)
2026	Landman	Detective Miller	

== See also ==
- LGBT culture in New York City
- List of LGBT people from New York City
- NYC Pride March
