= Edy Ganem =

Mexican-American actress

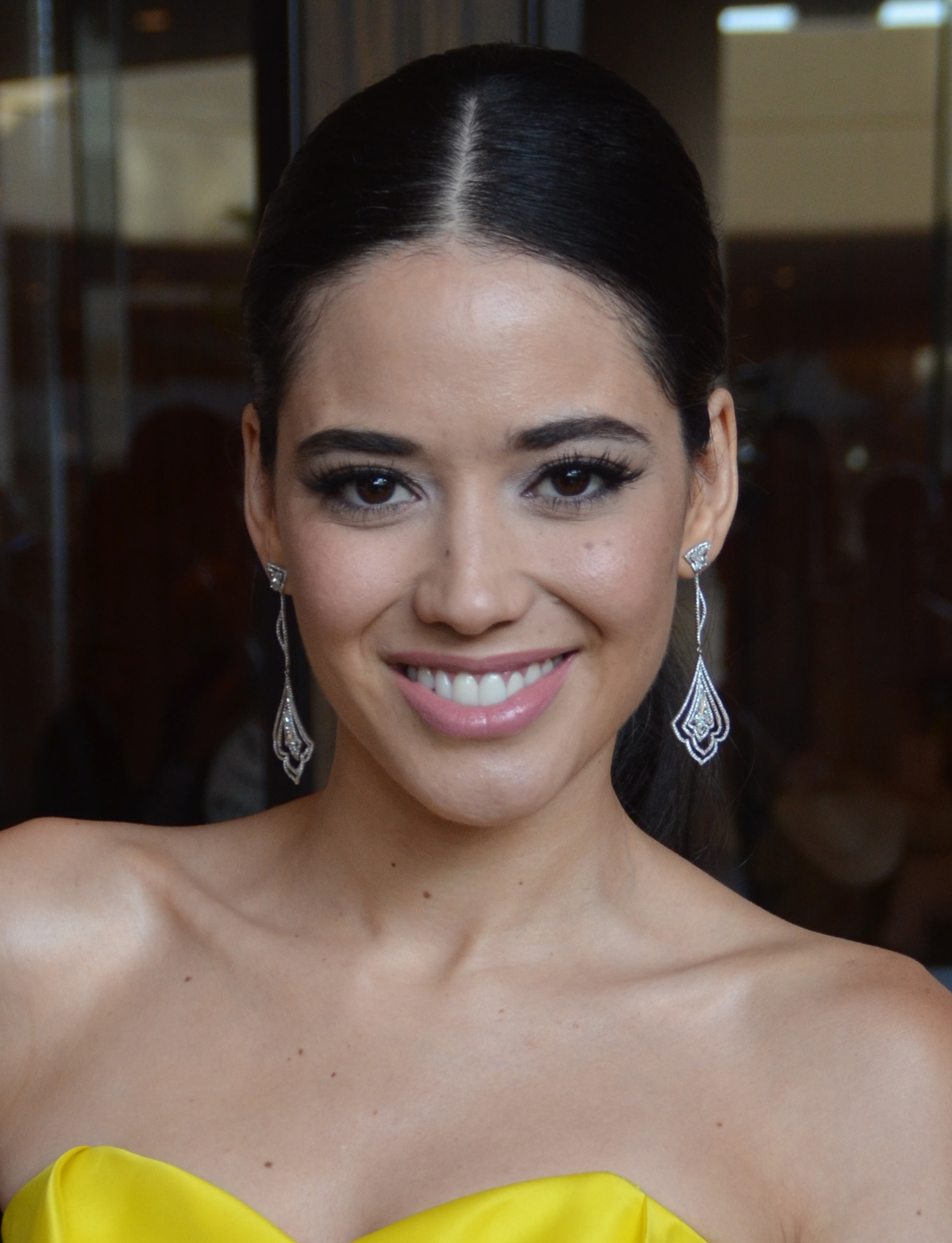
- Ganem at the 29th Annual Imagen Awards in 2014
- Born: Edurne Ganem; September 20, 1983 (age 43); Modesto, California, United States
- Citizenship: Mexico; United States
- Education: San Diego University
- Occupation: Actress
- Years active: 2008–present
- Spouse: Ryan Oehm (m. 2010; div. 2021)
- Children: 2

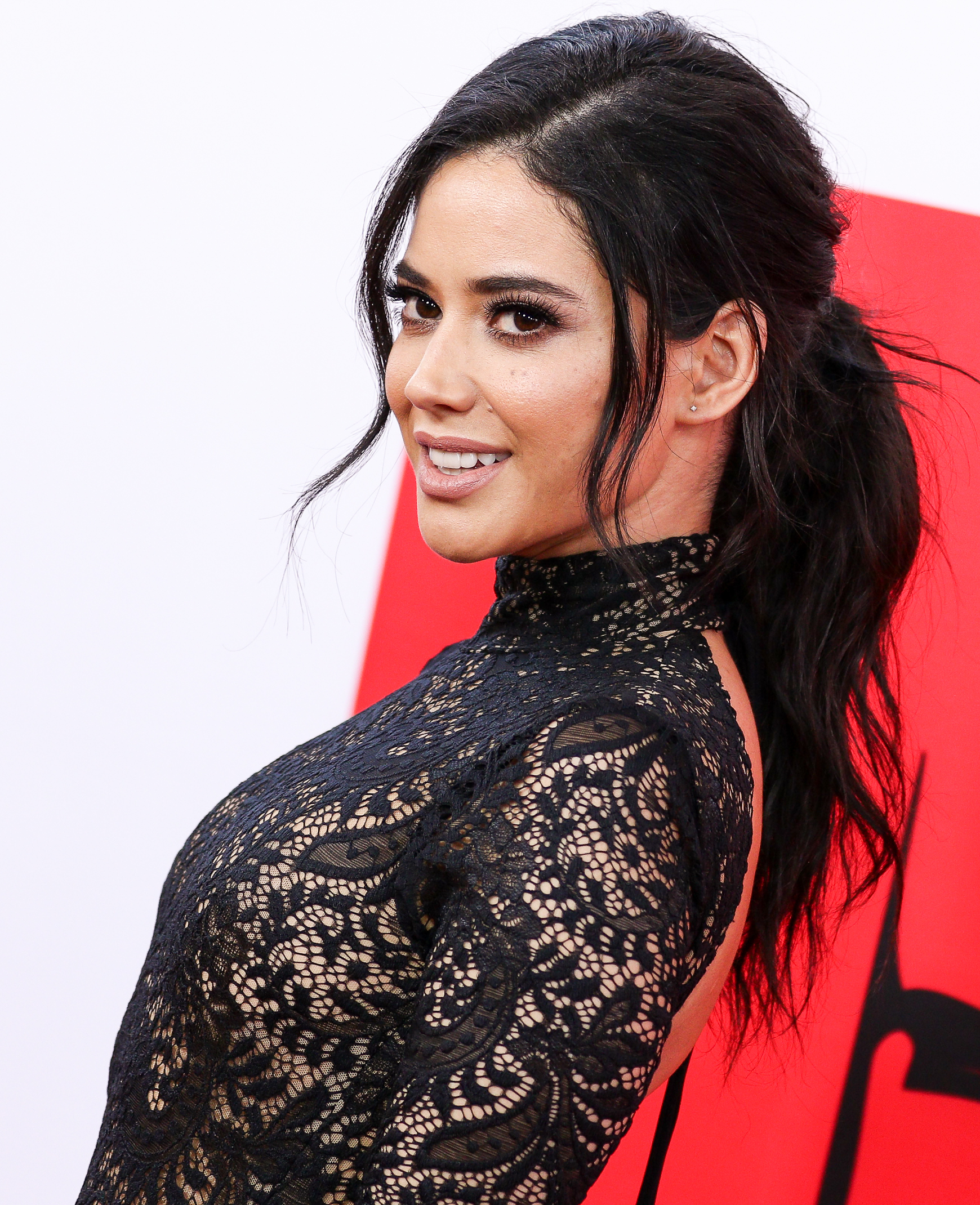
Edy Ganem at the premiere of The Gunman in Los Angeles (2015)

Edurne Ganem, known professionally as Edy Ganem, is a Mexican and American actress known for her role as Valentina Diaz in the Lifetime comedy-drama series Devious Maids.

== Life and career ==
Ganem was raised in Torreón, Coahuila, Mexico along with her two younger brothers. Her parents are both of Mexican and Lebanese descent, Ghanem being Arabic (غانم) for "victorious". She is a graduate of the University of San Diego. In 2008, she had various small roles in three episodes of HBO's comedy-drama series Entourage. Ganem had guest roles on several television shows, including It's Always Sunny in Philadelphia, CSI: Crime Scene Investigation, The Cleveland Show and Rob.

On Lifetime's Devious Maids, Ganem played Valentina Diaz, the positive, open-minded nineteen-year-old daughter and co-worker of Zoila Diaz (Judy Reyes) and love interest of Genevieve Delatour's (Susan Lucci's) son, Remi Delatour (Drew Van Acker). The Diazes both serve as maids to Delatours and the romance between Valentina and Remi is something that Zoila discourages.

== Personal life ==
On September 24, 2015, Ganem announced via Instagram that she was pregnant. An Instagram photo posted in February 2016 revealed that she gave birth to a son. On September 24, 2017, Ganem announced via Instagram that she was expecting her second child. An Instagram photo posted in February 2018 revealed that she gave birth to a daughter.

== Filmography ==
Film
| Year | Title | Role | Notes |
|---|---|---|---|
| 2009 | The Way to Happiness | Andi Bali | |
| 2010 | Las Angeles | Conchita | |
| 2010 | Roundabout | Linda | Short film |
| 2010 | The Loneliest Road in America | Amarantha | |
| 2010 | Black Limousine | Dolores | |
| 2011 | Salvador | Iris | Short film |
| 2011 | Lucha | Lucha | Short film |
| 2011 | Sex/Absurd | Kacie | |
| 2011 | Laptop | Jenny Mendez | Short film |
| 2011 | Like Crazy | Isabelle | Uncredited |
| 2011 | The Ghostmaker | Gina | |
| 2012 | Unspoken | Anna | Short film |
| 2012 | Ojalá | Young Olga | Short film |
| 2012 | Lola's Love Shack | Felicia | |
| 2012 | Goodbye, I Love You | | Short film |
| 2013 | Violeta | Carmen | Short film |
| 2014 | After the Wedding | Mariana Diaz | |
| 2015 | Ana Maria in Novela Land | Ana Maria / Ariana Tomosa | |
| 2015 | Tattooed Love | Yesenia | |
| 2018 | Created Equal | Alejandra B. | |
| 2019 | Made for You with Love | Amanda | |
| 2020 | Beneath Us | Sandra Silva | |
| 2020 | Useless Humans | Chum | |
| 2020 | In Other Words | Karina Salas | |
| 2021 | 7th & Union | Lucia | Originally titled “Color Box” |
| 2022 | Free Dead or Alive | Eva | Also executive producer |
| 2023 | Fool's Paradise | The Daughter | Uncredited |
| 2025 | Don't Let the Cat Out | Kim | |
| 2027 | The Revenge of La Llorona † | | Post-production |
| TBA | Gunland | | Short film, post-production |

=== Television ===
| Year | Title | Role | Notes |
|---|---|---|---|
| 2008 | Life, Love & Hollywood | Model | Episode: "Taking Risks" |
| 2008 | It's Always Sunny in Philadelphia | Model Contestant | Episode: "America's Next Top Paddy's Billboard Model Contest" |
| 2008 | Entourage | Various | 3 episodes |
| 2008 | CSI: Crime Scene Investigation | Go-Go Dancer | Episode: "Let It Bleed" |
| 2010–11 | Livin' Loud | Herself | 6 episodes |
| 2012 | The Cleveland Show | Flora (voice) | Episode: "Y Tu Junior Tambien" |
| 2012 | Rob | Monica | Episode: "Dad Comes to Visit" |
| 2013–2015 | Devious Maids | Valentina Diaz | Main cast (Seasons 1–2): 26 episodes Guest star (Season 3): 2 episodes |
| 2019–2020 | The Neighborhood | Sofia | 3 episodes |
| 2021–2022 | Bob Hearts Abishola | Olivia | Recurring, season 3 |
| 2022–2024 | 9-1-1 | Marisol | 5 episodes |

== Awards and nominations ==
| Year | Award | Category | Work | Result |
|---|---|---|---|---|
| 2014 | Imagen Awards | Best Actress - Television | Devious Maids | Nominated |
| 2015 | Imagen Awards | Best Actress - Feature Film | Ana Maria in Novela Land | Nominated |
