= Drew Van Acker =

American actor, model and producer (born 1986)

- Born: April 2, 1986 (age 39); Philadelphia, Pennsylvania
- Occupations: Actor; model; producer
- Years active: 2009–present

Drew Van Acker (born April 2, 1986) is an American actor, model and producer. He is known for playing Jason DiLaurentis, the older brother of Alison DiLaurentis (Sasha Pieterse), on Freeform's Pretty Little Liars (2010–2017) and Ian Archer in Cartoon Network's Tower Prep (2010). He has also starred as Remi Delatour on Lifetime's Devious Maids (2013–2015), and as Detective Tommy Campbell on the 2017 CBS police drama Training Day. Van Acker also starred in Addison Rae's music video for "Diet Pepsi".

== Early life ==
Van Acker was born on April 2, 1986 in Philadelphia, Pennsylvania, but lived in Medford, New Jersey his entire life. Van Acker is of Belgian descent. He attended Shawnee High School, where he began acting in their high school drama classes, where he also played on his school's soccer and lacrosse teams. His soccer abilities led him to receive a scholarship to Towson University in Maryland. While attending Towson, Van Acker took a number of theater courses in order to refocus on acting. He then made the decision to move to New York City, followed by a move to Los Angeles.

== Career ==
Van Acker's acting credits include Castle and ABC Family's Greek, as well co-starring in the TheWB.com series The Lake.

In 2010, Van Acker starred in the short-lived Cartoon Network live-action series Tower Prep. In June 2011, it was announced he had joined the cast of Pretty Little Liars as Jason DiLaurentis for the second season. Van Acker next appeared on Lifetime's Devious Maids as Remi Delatour. In 2017, he joined the CBS police drama Training Day as Detective Tommy Campbell. In 2019, Van Acker appeared as Garth/Aqualad in the DC Universe series Titans.

== Filmography ==
=== Film ===
Year	Title	Role	Notes
2012	Fortress	2nd Lt Bob Tremaine	Direct-to-video; also known as Flying Fortress
2014	Camouflage	Tim Lounge	
2019	Life Like	James	
2020	Spy Intervention	Corey Gage	Also executive producer
2021	Last Survivors	Jake	Also executive producer
TBA	Bethesda	Carter	Post-production

=== Television ===
Year	Title	Role	Notes
2009	Castle	Donny Kendall	Episode: "Hedge Fund Homeboys"
2009	Greek	Parker	Episode: "High and Dry"
2010	Tower Prep	Ian Archer	Main role
2011–2016	Pretty Little Liars	Jason DiLaurentis	Recurring role (seasons 2–3, 5–6), guest role (seasons 4, 7)
2013–2015	Devious Maids	Remi Delatour	Main role (seasons 1–2), guest role (season 3)
2017	Training Day	Detective Tommy Campbell	Main role
2019	Hell's Kitchen	Himself	Guest diner; Episode: "An Episode of Firsts"
2019	Titans	Garth / Aqualad	Guest role

=== Web ===
Year	Title	Role	Notes
2009	The Lake	Ryan Welling	Main role; 12 episodes
2012	Pretty Dirty Secrets	Jason DiLaurentis	Episode: "A Reunion"

=== Music videos ===
Year	Title	Artist(s)	Role	Ref.
2018	"Give Me Your Hand"	Shannon K	Himself	
2024	"Diet Pepsi"	Addison Rae	Himself	
