= Devious Maids season 3 =

Devious Maids
- Season 3
- Season promotional art
- Starring: Ana Ortiz; Dania Ramirez; Roselyn Sánchez; Judy Reyes; Rebecca Wisocky; Tom Irwin; Grant Show; Brianna Brown; Brett Cullen; Gilles Marini; Cristián de la Fuente; Nathan Owens; Susan Lucci
- No. of episodes: 13

Release
- Original network: Lifetime
- Original release: June 1 – August 24, 2015

Season chronology
- ← Previous; Season 2 Next → Season 4

The third season of the American television comedy-drama series Devious Maids premiered on Lifetime on June 1, 2015. The season consisted of 13 episodes. Lifetime renewed the show for a fourth season on September 24, 2015.

== Plot ==
A deranged gunman takes aim at the maids during Rosie and Spence's wedding, leaving everyone to wonder who will survive. In the wake of this tragedy, the women lean on each other like never before, even as they face complex problems in their own lives. Zoila ponders her next steps after discovering that she is pregnant and uncertain who the father may be. Carmen realizes there is more than meets the eye to the charming Sebastien. Meanwhile, Valentina and Remi struggle to connect in the aftermath of the shooting; Marisol's aspirations lead her to a surprising career change; and Blanca, a new maid in the neighborhood, lands a job with a seemingly picture-perfect family, but soon discovers a terrible secret that could change her life forever.

== Development ==
On September 26, 2014, it was announced that the series would return for a third season, set to premiere in 2015. Gilles Marini was added to the cast, in the role of Sebastian, a real estate agent Carmen gets involved with. In January 2015, it was confirmed that Brianna Brown would return to the main cast for the third season. In February 2015, it was reported that Glee actress Naya Rivera had joined the season in the recurring role of Blanca, a maid to a seemingly ideal family, who learns of a life altering secret. Later that month, Days of Our Lives actor Nathan Owens was cast in the regular role of Jesse, a recently returned home military man, and Cristián de la Fuente was cast as Ernesto Falta, Rosie's first husband. In April 2015, it was reported that the previous regulars Drew Van Acker and Edy Ganem had been demoted to recurring roles for the third season.

On March 30, 2015, co-star Ana Ortiz seemingly implied that the third season would be the series' last. However, director/producer David Warren stated on Twitter that the claim was false.

== Cast ==
=== Main ===
- Ana Ortiz as Marisol Suarez
- Dania Ramirez as Rosie Westmore/Falta
- Roselyn Sánchez as Carmen Luna
- Judy Reyes as Zoila Diaz
- Rebecca Wisocky as Evelyn Powell
- Susan Lucci as Genevieve Delatour
- Tom Irwin as Adrian Powell
- Grant Show as Spence Westmore
- Brianna Brown as Taylor Stappord
- Brett Cullen as Michael Stappord
- Gilles Marini as Sebastien Dussault
- Cristián de la Fuente as Ernesto Falta
- Nathan Owens as Jesse Morgan

=== Recurring ===
- Grecia Merino as Katy Stappord
- Alejandro Vera as Miguel Falta
- John O'Hurley as Dr. Christopher Neff
- Julie Claire as Gail Fleming
- Naya Rivera as Blanca Alvarez
- Joy Osmanski as Joy
- Alec Mapa as Jerry
- Issac Ryan Brown as Deion
- Michelle Hurd as Jacklyn Dussault
- Ivan Hernandez as Javier Mendoza
- Antonio Jaramillo as Hector

=== Guest cast ===
- Edy Ganem as Valentina Diaz
- Drew Van Acker as Remi Delatour
- Eddie Mills as Louie Becker
- Justina Machado as Reina
- Valerie Mahaffey as Olivia Rice
- Alex Fernandez as Pablo Diaz
- Mariana Klaveno as Peri Westmore

== Episodes ==
No. overall	No. in season	Title	Directed by	Written by	Original release date	US viewers (millions)
27	1	"Awakenings"	David Warren	Marc Cherry & Brian Tanen	June 1, 2015	1.47
Rosie is badly injured after her wedding's gunfire; she wakes up four months later to find out that Spence has been working as a pornographic actor in order to support his family. Marisol has a huge success with her book and becomes friends with wealthy people of Beverly Hills, but soon realizes that she doesn't belong to their world. Carmen, despite Marisol's concerns, continues her affair with Sebastian, and learns that her friend's warning might be true. Zoila takes a paternity test in order to determine who her baby's father is; the result leaves her with a difficult decision to make. Remy has become overly protective toward Valentina since the shooting. The women befriend Blanca, a young girl who works as a maid to pay for her college; she is recommended to the Stappords, who have just returned to town with their strange adoptive daughter, Katy. Blanca quickly gets caught up with the family's horrifying mess. The Powells have trouble with their sex life, which eventually pushes Adrian back to his old habits.
28	2	"From Here to Eternity"	David Warren	Curtis Kheel	June 8, 2015	1.42
Blanca cleans up the bloody mess in the Stappords home, with Taylor claiming that a burglar broke into the house and she stabbed the burglar with a knife. However, Blanca realized that Taylor is lying when a detective came over asking Taylor about the foot that was found in the Powell's rose garden. Marisol gave her advice that when a maid knows her employer's secret, she can try to take advantage, which ends up in Blanca blackmailing Taylor for her college fees. Marisol opens up a maid employment agency however, Carmen gets mad when she found out that Marisol can't get her any offers because she's a "bad maid". Marisol found Carmen a job at the Powell's house when Adrian mentions that Evelyn likes to get mad at bad maids. Rosie takes a look at Spence's filthy apartment and demands that he cleans it himself. When Zoila and Carmen comes over to the apartment, Spence tricks them into cleaning it, which makes Rosie even more furious when she discovers about it. To spruce up their sex life, the Powells goes to a sex club, Keri Maletto plays the Dominatrix, however, Evelyn is quickly embarrassed and goes home when a woman recognizes her. Remy proposes to Valentina and she accepts, but Zoila doesn't give her blessings. Things change when Javier proposes to Zoila, and Valentina doesn't give her blessings when she discovers that her mother is getting married and also pregnant just after Pablo died. Valentina changes her mind about waiting to have sex after marriage and Remy and Valentina end up having sex for the very first time.
29	3	"The Awful Truth"	Gil Junger	Ric Swartzlander	June 15, 2015	1.34
Genevieve throws Zoila and Javier a wedding party at her home. Rosie discovers that Zoila's baby is actually Pablo's, Zoila is confused whether to tell Javier or not. However, the chef that Genevieve hired for the wedding claims that she is Javier's ex-wife, Zoila is now convinced to not tell Javier so that they both can stand equal by holding a big secret from each other. Before the wedding, Javier confessed about his first marriage, Zoila later tells him about the baby, which makes Javier leaves her. Evelyn decides to sell her house because of its currently horrible reputation (The murder of Flora, Phillipe, and the foot). Carmen, who works there now is shocked to learn that the realtor is Sebastian, her ex-affair. They almost had sex, but is interrupted by Adrian. While trying to hide Sebastian, Carmen accidentally slammed the door on Adrian's hand, Adrian enjoys the pain since he feel like he needs to be "punished", and tells her that her trial period is over. Meanwhile, Marisol is trying to deal with Jesse, a man looking a job as a maid. After being rejected, Jesse asks a recently fired maid about where her former employer's house is. Marisol tries to explain about Jesse to her client, but she continues the charade when her client, who rejected 3 maids tells her that she was going to give Marisol a bad reputation if she screws one more time. Ernesto, Rosie's first husband is in town and is looking for Rosie. Spence meets him and tells him that Rosie is still in a very fragile state, and the news could put her back to coma. Ernesto follows Spence to the house and shocks Rosie. After she wakes up, Spence tells her that he knew Ernesto was alive, which makes Rosie angry since he lied to her. Blanca gives Taylor Katie's disturbing painting about the night the burglar broke in. After Katie tells her that her father is dead and finding the paintings in the garbage, Blanca is convinced that Katy might have murdered Michael. However, Michael comes home after a business trip from Boston, which shocks Blanca. Later, after the wedding, Blanca goes back to the Stappord's home and she is kidnapped by an unknown man.
30	4	"Since You Went Away"	Gil Junger	Davah Avena	June 22, 2015	1.14
Carmen continues her affair with Sebastian. After Adrian asked her to step on his back with her high heels (while claiming it's a medical condition), she realized that Adrian might have a strange fetish with pain. Adrian asked her to do it again, only this time, he's going to pay her, to which she agrees. At the Stappords house, Carmen came over to pick up her dress from Blanca, Taylor claims that Blanca quit her job and took away after the wedding night. Katy tells Michael that a man came over while he was away, he later accuses Taylor cheating on him, but she denies it. Genevieve is asked out on a date by her doctor, and later during dinner he asked her to come with him to Greece for 6 months. Zoila is mad at Genevieve for saying yes, because she's going to be all alone during her pregnancy. Ernesto tries to take Miguel with him back to Mexico, Rosie and Spence had an argument about this, which Miguel overheard. They both decide to help Ernesto stay in the US so that he can be part of Miguel's life. At the Fleming's house, Jesse found a hand in Gail's garden. To avoid scandal, Gail asked him to dump the hand at the Powell's house (since they already found a severed leg in Evelyn's rose garden). Instead, Jesse went to Marisol, who returns the hand to Gail and tells her to call the police or she will. Gail fires Jesse, but Marisol decides to hire him since she needed a new assistant. The police identified the hand and the leg as Louie Becker's, Gail tells the detective that Louie was once involved in a relationship with Genevieve that ended badly. Later, the detective came over to Genevieve's house to investigate her.
31	5	"The Talk of the Town"	Tara Nicole Weyr	Charise Castro Smith	June 29, 2015	1.34
Genevieve is interrogated by the detective about her relationship with Louie Becker. She provides an alibi (which both Michael and Zoila confirms), however, she refused to tell him why she and Louie ended their relationship badly and directs the investigation towards Evelyn. She later revealed to Zoila that she and Louie made a sex tape, which Louie showed to the country club employees. Evelyn is also interrogated and found out that Genevieve directs the investigation towards her. Zoila talks about the sex tape with Carmen, and when Evelyn is about to fire her due to Carmen's reckless ironing job, Carmen revealed about the sex tape. Evelyn finds the sex tape and sends it to everyone at the country club as a form of revenge to Genevieve. Feeling embarrassed, Genevieve then gets mad at Zoila and decides to go with Dr. Neff to Greece for the next 6 months. Carmen continues being Adrian's dominatrix, Marisol saw her whipping Adrian and asked her to quit being his dominatrix. Sebastian also asked her to stop after receiving a request from Adrian to build him a "dungeon" in the Powell's new home. When Adrian saw Carmen and Sebastian kissing in the alley of his house, he used the information to blackmail Carmen. Rosie tries to fight her reaffection for Ernesto, as when she goes to the church, the Priest tells her that since her first husband is technically not dead, her second marriage is not counted and is considered as a sin, which leaves Rosie confused about her marriage status. Michael reveals to Taylor that before he went on his business trip, he sent Louie to the house to spy on Taylor, he also gave him the house keys. Michael decides to stay the night somewhere else, later Taylor is arguing with someone over the phone, possibly about Blanca's whereabouts. When she goes to the other room, Katie puts a few pills in her wine. Marisol came over the next morning and calls 911 after discovering Taylor lying unconscious on the couch.
32	6	"She Done Him Wrong"	Tara Nicole Weyr	David Grubstick	July 6, 2015	1.34
With Taylor in the hospital, Marisol watches over Katie for Michael, causing Jesse to wonder if she is avoiding him. When Marisol returns home, Jesse is waiting with dinner for her. Following some talk about her day with an understanding Jesse, Marisol initiates a kiss, but Jesse leaves immediately after. Marisol tries to apologize to Jesse, but is pleasantly surprised to find he returns her feelings. Zoila's sister, Reina, comes to visit, claiming it's to help Zoila. Zoila learns that Reina and her husband, Victor, are getting a divorce. Zoila visits Victor in order to convince him to take Reina back, but she instead learns of her sister's cheating with many men, including Pablo. In trying to throw Reina out of the house, Zoila winds up falling down the stairs, causing a scare for the baby. When Michael finds Taylor's pills in Katie's room, he confronts her. Katie tells Michael she put some in Taylor's drink to make her happy again. Michael yells at Katie, causing her to run away. In the morning, Michael learns that Katie is gone, while Evelyn finds an upset Katie on her doorstep. Rosie, thinking she has decided she wants Spence, tries for a romantic evening, but is interrupted by a thunderstorm. Rosie tries to get Ernesto to sign an annulment, which Ernesto refuses. Ernesto initiates a kiss, which Rosie first rebuffs, but then returns. Rosie talks to Spence about her returning feelings for Ernesto and how it's not fair to him, followed by her leaving. Adrian tries to get Carmen to shock him and she snaps, forcing her to call Sebastian to help her cover up the real reason for Adrian's seizure. When the doctor confronts Evelyn and her husband about the bruises on Adrian's body, the doctor tells him that it must stop before it kills him. Marisol and Carmen tell Evelyn about everything that happened with Adrian. After initially firing Carmen, Evelyn is forced to reconsider when Marisol lays out what the consequences could be for doing that. Sebastian tells Carmen that he has a plan to get out of his marriage. In the hospital, Evelyn tells Adrian that he has to give her something she wants, a child. Michael tells Katie that she can't run off like that again because of the people looking for her. She asks if he's going to call her Katie forever, but their conversation is interrupted by someone at the door. Michael opens it to Rosie, who says she is their new maid.
33	7	"The Turning Point"	Victor Nelli, Jr.	Charise Castro Smith	July 13, 2015	1.35
Tired of Reina, Zoila calls Genevieve's hotel and tells her to come home because of an emergency. Genevieve comes home and Zoila quickly asks her to get rid of Reina. However, when Reina tells Genevieve that Zoila complained about her while she was away, she decided to hire Reina as her new shopping assistant. Later, Zoila takes Genevieve to her favorite restaurant and tells Reina they will be home late. They both came home early and encounters a naked man with Reina wearing Genevieve's fur coat. Genevieve fires Reina and apologizes to Zoila for doubting her. Reina figures out that Zoila had this all planned and tells her that this is the last time Zoila will see her, but Zoila brushed it off. Rosie leaves Spence and decides to get a fresh start with Ernesto. They both go on a date and end up having sex. While babysitting Katy, Rosie noticed that Katy is able to play a Mexican game and claims that she enjoyed eating the candy Rosie gave, which is from Mexico. Rosie figures that Katy is not from Argentina, but from Mexico. Katy gave her a gift: Blanca's necklace. Having a hard time with the adoption agency, Evelyn tries to "buy" Zoila's baby, but she refused. Evelyn decides that it would be much easier to just bribe the adoption agency. Blanca is held hostage at a basement, while her kidnapper is away, she managed to untie herself and escape from the basement. Upstairs, she found a shrine dedicated to Louie Becker's murder with various newspaper articles regarding the murder taped to the walls. She is quickly recaptured when the kidnapper returns. Marisol is mistaken for a pimp when Gail tells one of her friend that Marisol is paying Jesse for sex and maid service. Gail later tells her that if Marisol keeps paying Jesse, they both don't stand equal and wonders if Jesse will continue with the relationship if Marisol stopped paying him. Carmen is noticed by a talent scout and gets an agency deal. However, the agency's head is Sebastian's wife, Jacklyn Dussault. Sebastian tells her since he can't break his pre-nup, he plans to make Carmen rich and famous, and then he'll leave his wife. Carmen rejects the plan, but signs the deal after Jacklyn taunts her that she's not a star material. Sebastian shows Evelyn a house that he thinks is perfect for raising a child. They both found Blanca's dead body hanging from the ceiling along with the words "FORGIVE ME" written in red on the floor.
34	8	"Cries and Whispers"	Victor Nelli, Jr.	David Grubstick	July 20, 2015	1.17
The maids discussed about Blanca's death, and they all agree that Blanca couldn't have done this and someone else is responsible for her death. Hector, one of the cartel's agent visits Ernesto and tells him that the boss wants him back (also suggesting that Ernesto isn't being held captive by the Cartel after all). Ernesto refuses and Hector threatens to possibly harms Rosie if he doesn't comply. Ernesto became overprotective of Rosie when they both encounter Hector at a cafe. Both Michael and Taylor are questioned by the police about Blanca's disappearance and death. Rosie hands over the necklace to Michael, telling him that the necklace was broken, meaning that the necklace was accidentally dropped while Blanca was struggling from her kidnapper. Ernesto sneaks into the house to watch after Rosie, but Michael finds him and hits him with a golf club. Ernesto later encounters Katy in the kitchen and calls her 'Violeta', she tells him that her name is Katy and runs away. Meanwhile, Marisol is being seduced by a client, Jesse beats him and throw him out of the house when the client goes too far. Marisol tries to talk about it with Jesse during dinner, however when a girl flirts with Jesse in the restaurant Marisol slaps her. Marisol explains that ever since her first marriage, she's been trying to find Jesse's flaw to make sure it doesn't happen again. Jesse assures her that their relationship is going to be fine, when Marisol leaves to take a shower, it is revealed that Jesse carries a gun in his back the whole time. Dr. Neff returns from Greece and moves in with Genevieve because he rented his house while he was abroad, much to Zoila's dismay. Zoila couldn't sleep after overhearing Dr. Neff saying "Ooh-la-la" while having sex with Genevieve. Genevieve tells Zoila that she also hates the "Ooh-la-la". Zoila discussed this with Dr. Neff and he accused Genevieve of being co-dependent with Zoila and cares more about her than she cares more about him. Zoila overheard the conversation and decides to move out from Genevieve's house. Jacklyn invites Carmen to a double date, and Carmen asks a guy from the coffee shop to be her date. During the date, Sebastian flirts with one of the waiter in French, causing Jacklyn to storms out of the restaurant. The next day, Carmen tells her that she doesn't need a man like Sebastian, and Jacklyn kissed her. Michael confronts Taylor about Blanca and the necklace, Taylor tells him that if she tells him more, he will be considered as an accomplice. Michael later leaves Taylor. Ernesto meets with Hector again and tells him that he wants his freedom, and in exchange he will tell the boss about the girl that the boss has been looking for.
35	9	"Bad Girl"	David Grossman	Brian Tanen & Davah Avena	July 27, 2015	1.27
Adrian returns to his house only to find Evelyn managed to adopt a boy named Deion. Evelyn tells him that the adoption aren't final yet and they're currently fostering Deion. Adrian scares Deion by telling him about Flora's murder and the foot in Evelyn's garden. Evelyn is furious, and Adrian confessed that after Barrett died, he doesn't want to get attached to another child anymore. Evelyn tells him that they both have to move on with their lives. Later, Adrian makes a call to an investigator, asking the person to find Deion's birth parents. Dr. Neff has been rearranging Genevieve's kitchen, which makes Zoila mad. To prove her loyalty, she cleans the entire house on her day off. While cleaning, Zoila discovers Dr. Neff's maid, Joy, is also cleaning the house. She is even more furious to learn that Genevieve knew this all along. Genevieve assures her that Joy can help reduce her work while Zoila is pregnant, and soon, everything will be back to normal. Carmen tries to ask Jacklyn about the kiss, but she sees that Jacklyn kissed everyone on the office. Jacklyn confessed that when she kissed Carmen, she felt something and suggests exploring it. Sebastian tells Carmen to do it so he can catch Jacklyn having an affair, and that'll break his pre-nup. Carmen can't go through with it and leaves Jacklyn's house. However, she left her phone and Jacklyn sees an incoming call from Sebastian on Carmen's phone. Marisol tries to get Jesse a job by submitting his resume to a country club. The manager tells her that Jesse works there before and was fired for having an incident with Louie Becker. Marisol investigates his apartment and finds a gun, which she points at Jesse when he returns. Jesse tells her that ever since he found Louie's hand, he bought the gun for protection and he was fired from the club because Louie spreads bad rumors about him. Marisol apologized, but Jesse asked her to leave. Rosie finds an adult magazine in Miguel's bed, since Ernesto is away on a trip, she decides to ask Spence to give Miguel some advice. Miguel later tries to kiss Katy, but Katy pushes him and tells him that she will kill him and dance in his blood if he ever do that again. Rosie asks Taylor about this, and Taylor tells her that Katy witnessed her birth father's murder and the killer screams the same thing she said earlier. Taylor and Michael can't tell people about Katy's origins because she is considered as a witness, and revealing her origins will endanger her safety. Michael later stops by Marisol's place and asks her to keep an eye on Taylor since she might be having an affair. Rosie visits Spence again and Spence reveals that when Rosie left him, he was devastated. He took care of Miguel and stayed by Rosie's side when she was in a coma, but Rosie left him anyway. Rosie apologizes and leaves the apartment. However, Taylor was in Spence's bedroom the whole time and asked him if Rosie knows anything. Spence answers that she doesn't know anything.
36	10	"Whiplash"	David Grossman	Benjamin Wiggins & Christian Spicer	August 3, 2015	1.41
Realizing that Jacklyn may already know about the affair, Carmen tells her that Sebastian is her realtor. Jacklyn isn't convinced and secretly tapes Sebastian and Carmen having sex. The footage appears when Carmen promotes her album on a talkshow. She decides to end things with Sebastian since their relationship destroyed Carmen's career. Carmen later apologized to Jacklyn, but she reveals the label won't drop her, and her album will be shelved and left to rot since Carmen already signed the contract. Jesse asked Marisol to give his reference to his new employer, the employer turns out to be Olivia, Michael's ex-wife. Marisol ends up saying that Jesse might not suit her taste, which makes Jesse mad and breaks up with Marisol. Marisol tells Olivia about her relationship and why she should hire Jesse, Olivia tells her that she's in a relationship with Michael. Suspicious about Taylor going to the gym very often, Rosie follows Taylor, hoping to catch her having an affair. However, she saw Spence getting slapped by Taylor in the face. Rosie confronts Spence and also slaps him. Taylor explains that they're not having an affair, when Taylor was overdosed, she realized that she was getting dependent on her pills. She attends an addiction group and asked Spence to be her sponsor, Spence can't tell Rosie because the group was anonymous. When Spence asked to quit, Taylor slaps him. Rosie later apologized and tells Spence to continue being Taylor's sponsor. Evelyn asked Adrian to babysit Deion for the entire day, she later visits the adoption agency and the agent tells her that she needs to do a house inspection to make sure. Deion and Adrian ends up bonding while Evelyn is away. Olivia tells Evelyn that if she wants Adrian to behave properly during the inspection, she needs to drug him. During the inspection, the agent drinks Adrian's tampered drink and she ends up getting high. Adrian tells Evelyn that he starts to like Deion and is willing to give it a try. When the agent realized that she's been drugged, she gives the Powell a horrible score. However, Deion took pictures of the agent while she was high and threatens to show it to her boss. Both Adrian and Evelyn are happy to learn that Deion is just as manipulative as they are, with Adrian claiming that Deion is a Powell after all. Zoila decides to impress Dr. Neff, but Joy always ends up outshining her work. Joy accidentally tripped while carrying Dr. Neff's mother urn and she reveals that she owe Dr. Neff because he didn't charge anything when Joy's mother fell ill. And when she died, Dr. Neff offered the job to Joy. Zoila later took the blame, and Dr. Neff tells Joy that sooner or later Genevieve will have to choose between him or Zoila, and Joy will have to help her make the right decision. Marisol and Rosie are incredibly suspicious about Olivia, especially after she said that Blanca was murdered, since everyone sees Blanca's death as a suicide. Olivia later shaves her head bald.
37	11	"Terms of Endearment"	David Warren	Ric Swartzlander	August 10, 2015	1.34
Ernesto returns from Mexico just in time for Miguel's birthday. Taylor allows Rosie to have the party at the house while she and Katy goes out of town. Hector still doesn't believe that Ernesto has found Violeta and demands proof. During the party, Hector sneaks into the house dressed as a clown and taking pictures of Katy's photograph. Spence caught him and they both fight, Ernesto interrupts the fight but ends up punching Spence. Rosie later tells him that they both can't be friends anymore since he ruined Miguel's birthday party. Hector is worried about Spence, but Ernesto assures him that he will take care of Spence. Deion has been pulling pranks on Carmen lately, and Evelyn later asks her to punish Deion if he misbehaves again. However, Evelyn is furious and reduce Carmen's salary when she finds Deion scrubbing the floor. Marisol tells her about Barrett, and he might be the reason Evelyn doesn't want to punish Deion. Evelyn hears Deion saying an inappropriate word and asked Carmen to punish him. Carmen tells her that Evelyn herself is the one who should punish him. Deion later apologized to Carmen, and after Deion and Evelyn leaves, Carmen looks at a baby picture and starts to cry. Michael confirms to Marisol that he is dating Olivia. Marisol tries to snoop Olivia's house, but is stopped by Jesse and tells her that Olivia has cancer. Olivia later tells Michael that her condition is getting much worse and asked him to move in with her, which he accepts. Jesse became suspicious when he found a burger wrapper in the kitchen and also when asked, Olivia can't tell him what kind of cancer she have. He starts to snoop around the house and found no traces of any cancer medication whatsoever, some vomit-inducing drugs, and an article to fake cancer on her tablet. Marisol tells Michael about this, and he quickly leaves Olivia, telling her that she's crazy and he was never in love with her. Olivia visits Marisol and tells her that she paid a man to have an affair with Taylor, but when she's about to give the man's name, she pulls out a knife instead. She tells her that Michael is the one who thinks that Blanca was murdered and she was just gossiping. Jesse comes to her aid and gets stabbed, while Marisol knocks Olivia unconscious with a lamp. After getting treatment for the stab wound, Jesse tells Marisol that he plans to go back to Seattle, and Marisol says that she will miss him. Joy tells Zoila that she failed to withdraw the paycheck from Dr. Neff. She also tells her that Dr. Neff is currently broke thanks to paying alimony for his six ex-wives and a few bad investments he made over the years. Dr. Neff later proposed to Genevieve, but Zoila interrupts the proposal by faking a contraction. At the hospital, Zoila tells Genevieve that Dr. Neff is broke, and Genevieve began to believe it's true when Dr. Neff borrowed her wallet. Later, Dr. Neff continues the proposal, and Genevieve asked him about his current wealth. Dr. Neff assures her that he's wealthy, but later realized Zoila is the one who tells her that he's broke. He tells Genevieve that it's time to choose between him or Zoila, and Genevieve later tells Zoila that she's letting go of her. It is later revealed that Dr. Neff purposely made Zoila think he was broke so he can convince Genevieve to fire her. While cleaning Taylor's couch pillows from cupcake stains, Rosie and Ernesto found blood stains on the couch pillows. Hector later visits Spence's apartment and knocks him unconscious.
38	12	"Suspicion"	David Warren	Curtis Kheel	August 17, 2015	1.52
Deion agrees to be adopted by Evelyn and Adrian, however Adrian's P.I. has found Deion's birth father, and he's willing to take Deion back. To fool the father, Adrian sent Evelyn and Deion to Paris, while he and Carmen casts another kid to pose as Deion. When the father comes to visit Deion, the real Deion and Evelyn came back after missing their flight in New York. Carmen reveals that she used to have a child, but she gave it up. The father is almost convinced to leave Deion with the Powells, but when Adrian tries to bribe him, he takes Deion back. After Deion leaves, Evelyn starts to cry. Carmen realized that she doesn't want to be alone and comes back to Sebastian. Rosie tells Taylor about the red stains, but Taylor tells her that it's red wine. When she's about to test it for blood, Taylor already replaced the couch with a new one. Ernesto and Hector continues their plan to kill Katy. Katy managed to fight back Hector and calls Rosie and Ernesto. Taylor tells Rosie that Katy's father was investigating a drug cartel, and he was murdered before he can leak all the information. The drug cartel is the same one Ernesto is being held hostage. Rosie confronts him and he confessed all about his life in the drug cartel. Rosie quickly leaves him after he says that he's willing to trade Katy's life for their freedom. Marisol tries to get the man's name from Taylor, but she gets mad when Marisol asked her about it. Marisol later retrieve Taylor's couch and test it for blood, the results came out positive. Zoila is having a horrible time working for Gail after Genevieve fired her. When Gail kidnaps the neighbor's dog and took it to a kill shelter, Zoila quits and tells her that she saved the dog and convinced the neighbor to adopt a Chihuahua. Genevieve takes Joy out for lunch after she accidentally upsets her. Genevieve also tells her that they'll go to the spa after lunch, and she made a large donation to the Diabetes foundation in honor of Joy's deceased mother. This makes Joy feels guilty and she confessed to Genevieve that Dr. Neff made Zoila think he was poor so Genevieve can fire her. Genevieve later kicks Dr. Neff out from her house, and she reunites with Zoila. Later, Hector tries to continue with the plan, but Ernesto objects since Katy already saw Hector's face. Hector reveals that he already took care of Spence, and if they don't continue with the plan, Rosie will become his next target. Ernesto later strangles Hector to death.
39	13	"Anatomy of a Murder"	Tara Nicole Weyr	Brian Tanen	August 24, 2015	1.53
Carmen and Sebastian decide to get married. Evelyn also decides that she wants a divorce from Adrian after they both lost Deion. In retaliation, Adrian cancels the mansion sale so they can't split their assets when they're divorced. Rosie visits Spence, only to find his apartment wrecked and he's in the hospital with an amnesia. Ernesto decides to go back to Mexico in order to protect his family, and says goodbye to Miguel before leaving. Rosie later tries to help Spence remember, but Peri Westmore arrives and tells Spence that she's his wife and Rosie is their maid. Zoila and Genevieve go to couple's therapy to fix their relationship. Zoila tells the doctor that the problem is Genevieve's selfishness. Genevieve reveals that she's been talking to Javier, which makes Zoila furious. Later, they both get stuck in the elevator and Zoila's water breaks. Genevieve has reception on her phone so Zoila tells her that she may have to deliver the baby. Genevieve quickly opens the elevator's door using her high heels, and manages to crawl out and call for help. During the labor, complications occur and Genevieve is forced to choose whom to prioritise: Zoila or her baby. Michael tries to take Katy away from Taylor to protect her. Marisol continues investigating Blanca's murder and finds out that Katy may know who the murderer is. Before she can ask Katy, Taylor turns Michael in to the police and he is arrested for murder. Marisol confronts Taylor and she reveals that she's been having affair with Sebastian. After a visit from a woman claiming to be Sebastian's Yoga instructor, Carmen searches Sebastian's place, she finds her dress that Blanca was wearing the night she disappeared. Sebastian points a gun at her and texts Marisol to go to the Powell's mansion. Taylor and Katy decide to change their identities and run away, with Katy taking Rosie's name. When Marisol goes to the Powell's mansion, Evelyn was carrying a box filled with Adrian's sex toys and Sebastian shows up, pointing a gun at Carmen. Marisol, Adrian, Evelyn, and Carmen are held hostage by Sebastian using Adrian's sex handcuffs. It is revealed that while Sebastian was in the Stappord's house, Louie caught him and Taylor. Louie was impaled after Sebastian pushed him onto Taylor's glass coffee table. Katy woke up and Taylor takes her back to bed. Sebastian mutilates the body and spreads the body parts all over town to make sure the body was unidentifiable. Later, Blanca arrives and found the bloody mess. Sebastian covers up his tracks by kidnapping and killing Blanca, and also writing "Forgive Me" on the floor so everyone would think that Blanca did it. He also purposely led Evelyn to the house so she would find the body. Sebastian threatens to harm Evelyn if Adrian doesn't give him money. Adrian calls Michael, who has just been released from prison, since his alibi checked out, to give him money. Michael arrives at the mansion, but tries to go inside. In result, Sebastian takes Michael as a hostage. When Michael threatens to kill Sebastian once he gets out, Sebastian shoots him, killing him. Sebastian also plans to burn the house by leaking the gas. Marisol manages to get out from her handcuffs and hits Sebastian with a fireplace poker while Carmen distracts him. They flee the mansion and call the police, however, Adrian goes back inside to retrieve a photo of him, Evelyn and Barrett. When Sebastian wakes up, he accidentally drops Adrian's electrifier, creating a spark. The mansion explodes and Evelyn screams for Adrian as his fate is left unknown.

== Ratings ==
=== U.S. ratings ===
No. in series	No. in season	Episode	Air date	Time slot (EST)	Rating/share (18–49)	Viewers (m)	Rank (18-49)
27	1	"Awakenings"	June 1, 2015	Mondays; 9:00 p.m.	0.5	1.47	23
28	2	"From Here to Eternity"	June 8, 2015	Mondays; 9:00 p.m.	0.6	1.42	25
29	3	"The Awful Truth"	June 15, 2015	Mondays; 9:00 p.m.	0.5	1.34	30
30	4	"Since You Went Away"	June 22, 2015	Mondays; 9:00 p.m.	0.4	1.14	40
31	5	"The Talk of the Town"	June 29, 2015	Mondays; 9:00 p.m.	0.5	1.34	27
32	6	"She Done Him Wrong"	July 6, 2015	Mondays; 9:00 p.m.	0.5	1.34	37
33	7	"The Turning Point"	July 13, 2015	Mondays; 9:00 p.m.	0.5	1.35	27
34	8	"Cries and Whispers"	July 20, 2015	Mondays; 9:00 p.m.	0.4	1.17	42
35	9	"Bad Girl"	July 27, 2015	Mondays; 9:00 p.m.	0.4	1.27	45
36	10	"Whiplash"	August 3, 2015	Mondays; 9:00 p.m.	0.4	1.41	32
37	11	"Terms of Endearment"	August 10, 2015	Mondays; 9:00 p.m.	0.4	1.34	32
38	12	"Suspicion"	August 17, 2015	Mondays; 9:00 p.m.	0.5	1.52	23
39	13	"Anatomy of a Murder"	August 24, 2015	Mondays; 9:00 p.m.	0.5	1.53	19
