= List of Devious Maids characters =

Devious Maids is an American comedy-drama series that aired on Lifetime.

== Character Chart ==
Actor	Character	Seasons			
Actor	Character	1	2	3	4
Ana Ortiz	Marisol Suarez	Main	Main	Main	Main
Dania Ramirez	Rosie Falta	Main	Main	Main	Main
Roselyn Sanchez	Carmen Luna	Main	Main	Main	Main
Judy Reyes	Zoila Diaz	Main	Main	Main	Main
Edy Ganem	Valentina Diaz	Main	Main	Recurring	
Rebecca Wisocky	Evelyn Powell	Main	Main	Main	Main
Tom Irwin	Adrian Powell	Main	Main	Main	Main
Brianna Brown	Taylor Stappord	Main	Guest	Main	
Brett Cullen	Michael Stappord	Main		Main	
Mariana Klaveno	Peri Westmore	Main	Guest	Guest	Guest
Grant Show	Spence Westmore	Main	Main	Main	Main
Drew Van Acker	Remi Delatour	Main	Main	Recurring	
Wolé Parks	Sam Alexander	Main			
Susan Lucci	Genevieve Delatour	Main	Main	Main	Main
Mark Deklin	Nicholas Deering		Main		
Joanna P. Adler	Opal Sinclair		Main		
Dominic Adams	Tony Bishara		Main		
Colin Woodell	Ethan Sinclair		Main		
Gilles Marini	Sebastien Dussault		Guest	Main	
Cristián de la Fuente	Ernesto Falta			Main	
Nathan Owens	Jesse Morgan			Main	Main
Sol Rodriguez	Daniella Mercado				Main

== Main characters ==
=== Marisol Suarez ===
Marisol Suarez (Ana Ortiz) originally goes undercover as a Beverly Hills maid in order to personally investigate the murder of Flora Hernandez. Her son, Eddie, has been arrested for the crime, despite allegedly being innocent, and so over the course of six months she works to befriend fellow maids - Rosie Falta, Carmen Luna, and Zoila Diaz - and find out everything they know about Flora. Taking a job at the Stappord house, while also working part-time for the Powells (Flora's old bosses), Marisol eventually tracks down the true culprit, Philippe Delatour, and her son is exonerated.

Three months pass by the time of the second season, and by then she has entered into a relationship with the mysterious Nicholas Deering. He quickly proposes marriage to her and they move in together, but Marisol can't quite shake there being something secretive about him... and his maid, Opal. Upon doing a whole new investigation, Marisol comes to find out that Nick is responsible for the death of Evelyn and Adrian Powell's son, Barrett. After making him confess the truth to them, she has him turn himself in to the police.

Four months have now passed, by the time of the third season, and Marisol has successfully published a book on the events of the first season. Now working towards the next chapter of her life, she starts a maid placement agency, which leads her to hiring male maid Jesse Morgan, who she starts dating. Problems often occur throughout their romance, as Marisol's previous bad luck with men gets in the way of being happy, and so Jesse eventually leaves her. She then gets involved in the new mystery at hand though, surrounding her former employer Taylor Stappord, and she helps Rosie solve the case that it was really Taylor's love, Sebastien Dussault, who killed tennis pro Louie Becker and maid Blanca Alvarez.

Another time jump, this time being six months, leads into the fourth season. Marisol's book is now being made into a movie, and she enters into a new relationship with head of the studio, Peter Hudson. Jesse pops back up in her life, however, and it turns out he never moved back to Seattle like he originally claimed. Drama strikes when Peter turns out to be Genevieve Delatour's ex-husband, and she comes to claim him back; Marisol also has a brief affair with Jesse. Meanwhile, she also helps Rosie with solving the murder of Peri Westmore, and after that is all complete, Peter and Marisol make amends for the latter's affair, and Peter proposes marriage. She accepts, and a time jump to one year later shows them about to get married; however, Marisol doesn't make it down the aisle. The maids go to investigate and it appears she has been kidnapped.

=== Rosie Falta ===
Rosie Westmore (Dania Ramirez) originates from Guadalajara, Mexico, having immigrated to the United States and takes a job for Peri and Spence Westmore as their maid. While saving money to get her son, Miguel, to America, Rosie goes about life serving the Westmores and also tending to their one-year-old son, Tucker. Rosie winds up entering into an affair with the unhappily married Spence, and is the first to learn that her new friend, Marisol, isn't really a maid, but undercover. While deciding to help Marisol in her investigation, Rosie also keeps hiding her and Spence's affair from Peri. Spence finally decides he wishes to leave Peri and proposes to Rosie, but when Peri sneaks Miguel into America and reunites him with Rosie, she can't bring herself to hurt Mrs. Westmore in such a way. It's only then that Peri learns of Rosie and Spence's affair, as they're about to call it quits, and she puts in a call to immigration and has the maid arrested.

Three months later, in the second season, Rosie goes on trial and is allowed to stay in America until scheduled to seek asylum six months later. She goes to reunite with Spence, who ends his marriage with Peri, but they're forbidden to be together when Peri threatens to destroy her husband's career if the world finds out he's leaving her for the maid. Meanwhile, Rosie finds work in the dysfunctional Miller household, headed by the post-stroke patriarch Kenneth Miller. She also starts seeing Kenneth's nephew, Reggie Miller, but overtime she comes to realize Reggie's been working to tear the family apart, getting wife Didi and daughter Lucinda kicked out, and is prepared to take all of Kenneth's money for himself. Rosie works to stop Reggie and reunite the Millers, and ends up reuniting with Spence. They get married, but when exiting the church, Rosie is shot by Ty McKay and winds up in a coma for the next four months.

Bringing the show into the third season, Rosie finally wakes up from her coma and goes to be with Spence, finally... until her supposedly deceased husband, Ernesto Falta, returns to the picture. Apparently he faked his death and has spent the last five years with the Gaviota Cartel. Rosie fights her feelings for both Spence and Ernesto, but ends up choosing Ernesto. In the meantime she finds work in the Stappord house, but starts to notice something going on with their daughter, Katy. Meanwhile, Ernesto turns out to have been working for the cartel, and he tries to kidnap Katy, really named Violeta, who the cartel has been after for quite sometime. Rosie finds out the truth and condemns her for it, and he decides to do the right thing and leave to settle things once and for all with the cartel, in order to ensure Rosie and Miguel's safety. This means he is stepping aside for her to be with Spence, but when she leaves to do so, she learns he has been beaten to the point of losing his memory of the last three years... giving Peri the perfect opportunity to return and brainwash her ex-husband against their former maid.

Six months later, in the fourth season, Rosie is now working for Genevieve Delatour, and still longs to be with Spence, who has gotten back together with Peri. With the help of their butler Jesse, however, Rosie is able to get to Spence, but after he pushes her away, he slips and falls and regains all his memories. He confronts Peri for her lies... and she is found murdered the next morning. Spence is arrested for the murder, despite being innocent, and Rosie works to prove his innocence. In order to stay close to the Westmores' son, Tucker, she gets a job as his nanny, working for Peri's sister, Shannon Greene. Rosie uncovers all of Peri's greatest secrets, such as the true paternity of Tucker, being that he is the product of Hugh Metzger drugging and raping Peri. However, Rosie ultimately finds out it wasn't Hugh that killed Peri, but his daughter, Gail Fleming. Once she is arrested, Spence is exonerated, and Rosie reveals she is pregnant from one of their conjugal visits. A year passes and Rosie's baby is born, and she attends Marisol's wedding where she and the other maids find that Marisol has been kidnapped.

=== Carmen Luna ===
Carmen Luna (Roselyn Sanchez) longs to be a famous singer, which is why she takes the job of being a maid for popstar Alejandro Rubio. While trying to get close to him in hopes he'll make her a star, she also has to battle the Russian housekeeper, Odessa. Meanwhile, Sam Alexander, the butler, is also crushing very very hard on Carmen, despite her not necessarily reciprocating his feelings... or so she thought. While they go through obstacles, Carmen comes to realize that she wants to be with Sam and they decide to move in together. However, word gets out that Alejandro is gay, and so his agents decide that he needs to marry a woman to convince the press otherwise; they make a deal with Carmen that if she marries Alejandro they'll make her a star, but that means breaking off her relationship with Sam. She chooses stardom.

In the second season, Carmen lives a life of luxury as Alejandro's glamorous fiancée, but this is cut short when he is shot dead by a band of robbers stealing from the rich in Beverly Hills. Carmen and Odessa mourn his loss, and from there Carmen is forced to find work elsewhere, that being in the home of Rosie's former boss, Spence Westmore. She becomes his new live-in maid, just as his nephew Ty McKay comes for an extensive stay. As it turns out, he's one of the robbers from the gang that killed Alejandro, not that Carmen knows that, and Ty starts to develop an unhealthy obsession for the maid. Once it becomes quite clear how mentally unstable he is, Spence is forced to make him leave as Carmen refuses to be anywhere near him. Spence ends up firing Carmen though, when he and Rosie are about to get married, and at a bar she meets Sebastien, who she sleeps with after he promises to introduce her to the Head of Talent for Discerna Records... then he finds out that it's really his wife. Carmen attends Rosie's wedding, but notices Ty just as he is about to drive and shoot it up.

Four months pass by the time of the third season, and Carmen is in an ongoing affair with Sebastien. Marisol, who has started up her own maid placement agency, sets Carmen up with a job for Evelyn and Adrian Powell, the latter of which she becomes the dominatrix of. With Adrian having learned of Carmen's affair with Sebastien, who is acting as his and his wife's realtor, he threatens to go to Sebastien's wife if they do not continue their S&M sessions. It's all put to a stop when Carmen finally goes to Evelyn though, and she finally gets the time to meet Sebastien's wife, Jacklyn, about making her a true star. Jacklyn becomes quite the fan of Carmen, and even interested in her in a more romantic way, but this is all cut short when she becomes aware of her affair with Sebastien. To punish the maid, she holds her under an exclusive contract to prevent her from making music anywhere else. Carmen's relationship winds up not even being worth it though, as it turns out Sebastien killed Louie Becker and Blanca Alvarez, and he winds up dying in the explosion of the Powell mansion.

Six months later, in the fourth season, Carmen continues to work for the Powells when she finds herself being visited by Daniela Mercado, the daughter she gave up years before. Initially Daniela believes the two of them are cousins, and Carmen chooses to keep it that way all throughout her stay in Beverly Hills, but she soon finds out the truth when Carmen argues over it with Danni's adoptive mother, Josefina. Carmen decides to push Danni away, however, and she decides to go on the hunt for her birth father instead. Mad at Carmen though, she returns claiming that he - Lucas - is dead, when in reality he is very much alive and wishes to see his high school lover. Carmen and Danni wind up becoming close again when Carmen saves her from being drugged and raped by Hugh Metzger, and the two decide to start their relationship over, but Carmen remains oblivious to the truth regarding Lucas. A year passes through, and Carmen attends Marisol's wedding where she and the other maids find that Marisol has been kidnapped.

=== Zoila Diaz ===
Zoila Diaz (Judy Reyes) is the maid of Genevieve Delatour, and mother of the teenaged Valentina. While her whole world revolves around her daughter's success, this means that she must prevent her from engaging in a relationship with Genevieve's son, Remi, as Zoila believes rich boys never fall for the help. This is because years ago Zoila had a relationship with Genevieve's brother, Henri, that didn't go so well, and when Valentina confronts her mother over this, she finally understands that she must let her daughter make her own decisions. Zoila stands by as Genevieve starts to go through a financial crisis and Valentina builds a relationship with Remi. What she does not support, however, is Valentina giving up her dream to go to Africa with Remi for a year. She convinces him to go without her, and to leave a note Zoila has previously already written. Valentina ends up finding out the truth though, and leaves for Africa without telling her mother. Meanwhile, Genevieve gets back together with her ex-husband, Philippe Delatour, something that goes unblessed by Zoila. The maid winds up taking part in unmasking him as having killed Flora Hernandez.

By the second season, three months have passed, and Zoila struggles to get in touch with Valentina. She soon returns from Africa though, having broken things off with Remi, and the two wind up making amends as Zoila decides to finally quit meddling in her life. Pablo, Zoila's husband, has previously left her for this, sending Zoila into the arms of chef Javier Mendoza. As the two fall hard and fast for one another, their relationship goes interrupted when Pablo returns to Zoila's life when Valentina gets into some trouble with the law. As the two start to spend more time together they wind up having an affair, and Zoila is left to choose which man she wishes to be with. She confesses the affair to Javier, but chooses Pablo... until she finds out he only wanted her back because he was homeless. She reconsiders her decision and return to Javier, but then finds out she's pregnant and doesn't know who the father is.

Four months later, in the third season, Zoila gets through mourning the death of Pablo, who was shot dead at Rosie's wedding, and is now more focused on revealing her pregnancy and confessing to whether or not the baby is his. Genevieve convinces her to pass it off as his, but when Zoila and Javier prepare to get married, she tells him the truth and he leaves her at the altar. This makes way for Zoila and Genevieve to start building on their own relationship, relying on one another, that is, until Genevieve begins seeing Dr. Christopher Neff, who frowns upon his girlfriend's closeness with the help. He works to sabotage their friendship, only for Genevieve to choose Zoila over him in the end. Zoila and Genevieve realize they do need to work on their relationship though, but now is not the time as Zoila goes into labor. Complications occur, however, and Genevieve is left to decide whom to prioritize: Zoila or her baby.

Six months pass, into the fourth season, and it's revealed Genevieve chose to prioritize Zoila and that she lost her baby in the hospital. Zoila is unable to forgive Genevieve, and winds up quitting, taking a job for an away fashion executive instead. As she'll be gone for six months though, Zoila starts to pass herself off as the owner of the house, which gets her into a relationship with a man named Kyle. This doesn't go approved by his mother Frances though, who works to sabotage it. Zoila also befriends Adrian Powell to fill the void Genevieve has left, but Zoila's fantasy starts to die down and she slowly breaks things off with Kyle. This is just as her employer, Fiona, is returning home though. Zoila plays a part in helping Rosie solve Peri Westmore's murder, as Kyle and Frances run a cult known as "The Circle" that has something to do with it, and Zoila quits her job for Fiona and returns to Genevieve. The two have made amends and decide to not meddle in each other's lives, which prevents Zoila from saying anything when she finds her boss has begun dating a woman named Lori. A year passes though, and Zoila attends Marisol's wedding, where she and Adrian exchange questionable glances. She and the other maids soon find that Marisol has been kidnapped.

=== Valentina Diaz ===
Valentina Diaz (Edy Ganem) is one of the maids of Genevieve Delatour, and the daughter of Zoila Diaz. She longs for the love of Genevieve's son, Remi, and attempts to form a relationship with him to her mother's dismay. Zoila works to prevent Valentina from getting close to him, as she believes rich boys never fall for the help, but after stepping aside she is proven wrong. Valentina ends up being able to get well acquainted with Remi, and after getting him through rehab when he becomes addicted to cocaine, he returns home and the two of them enter a relationship. It's when Remi wants to go to Africa for a year that Zoila tries to intervene again, as she doesn't want Valentina to throw away her dream of going to fashion school. She convinces Remi to go alone and leaving a pre-written note explaining why. This hurts Valentina, leading to Zoila confessing the truth; the mother and daughter have a falling out, and Valentina leaves for Africa without saying a word.

Three months pass by the time of the second season, and Valentina returns home as she and Remi have broken up. She tries to avoid Zoila at first, and takes a job as the Powells live-in maid, but she and her mother finally make up when Zoila promises to quit meddling in her daughter's life. Remi returns from Africa too, wanting Valentina back, but she finds herself in a new relationship with a poolboy named Ethan. Remi fights for Valentina's love, but the longer she spends with Ethan, the more his true colors comes out. Valentina officially terminates her relationship with Ethan when learning he is part of a robbery gang who killed Alejandro Rubio, and she gets back with Remi. This puts her in danger though, because, while Ethan goes on the run, the unstable member Ty McKay decides it's best to kill Valentina to keep her quiet. Valentina and Remi attend Rosie and Spence's wedding together, and Ty drives by to try and kill her, but misses, only killing her father Pablo instead.

Four months later, in the third season, Valentina and Remi are in a stable relationship, though the latter is more protective ever since the wedding shoot-out. When Remi finds himself being accepted into a school in New York, however, he convinces Valentina to join him since she can take a fashion internship up there too. They leave to do so, but not without becoming engaged and Remi taking Valentina's virginity.

=== Evelyn Powell ===
Evelyn Powell (Rebecca Wisocky) is the unhappy wife of Adrian Powell. She and her husband are the employers of murdered maid Flora Hernandez, and their lives start to pique the interest of Marisol Suarez, whose son, Eddie, was falsely arrested for killing the maid. As it turns out, Adrian runs a prostitution business where he hires women to sleep with his friends and then he records the sessions to make his own person pornography. This hobby disgusts Evelyn, but it's the only way to keep him from leaving her, as he blames her for their son being hit by a car; she looked away from him for just a few seconds. As Marisol digs through the Powells secrets, she works to find out the real killer of Flora Hernandez, but once doing so, she fails to get a proper confession out of him. It's the Powells who get justice for Flora, as they find out Philippe Delatour killed her, and they kill him themselves by poisoning him and throwing him off their balcony. Marisol and the maids add that he confessed to Flora's murder, and the Powells and the maids silently part ways.

Three months pass for the second season and the Powells appear to be in a fairly good place, that is, until their home is robbed during a dinner party and Adrian is left traumatized. Because of this, the couple hire a bodyguard named Tony Bishara, who Evelyn becomes instantly infatuated with. The couple also hire Valentina Diaz as a maid. Evelyn and Tony end up entering an affair, and they work to get Adrian sent off to a mental hospital for a brief period of time so they can be alone together; they just have to worry about Valentina. It's she who basically exposes their affair to Adrian, but when he catches them in the act he realizes how hurt he truly is. Adrian does away with Tony when learning he's really a con artist though, and works to rebuild his marriage with Evelyn. This is only enhanced when Marisol hauls her new husband, Nicholas Deering, who was also once friends with the Powells and make him confess to being the driver that ran over their son fifteen years before. As the Powells cry over this revelation, Marisol takes Nick to turn himself in to the police while Adrian and Evelyn decide to forgive one another for everything.

Four months later, and into the third season, Evelyn and Adrian seem to be happy, but their sex life lacks. Adrian comes to find he has a particular interest in bondage, whereas Evelyn decides she wants to sell their home when the severed leg of tennis pro Louie Becker winds up in their yard. Adrian fails to get Evelyn into his new found S&M lifestyle, and instead blackmails new maid Carmen Luna into joining him. She goes to Evelyn about this though, and it's put to a stop, while Evelyn has decided she desires the love of a child. She decides to foster a son by the name of Deion, who Adrian initially hated, but soon grows fond of. When he's taken away by his birth father though, Evelyn decides to end her marriage with Adrian. However, unforeseen events involving the exposure of their realtor Sebastien Dussault being an exposed as a murderer results in the explosion of their home, leaving Adrian's fate unknown.

A time jump of six months occur, making way for the fourth season, and Evelyn has become trapped in her marriage with Adrian as he fakes paralysis from the home explosion. Though she leaves him when learning the truth, Adrian is determined to make her fall in love with him again and so he works to destroy her life to send her crawling back. He seizes control over their accounts, preventing her from having any money, and she is forced to work for Marisol's maid company as her assistant. She begins dating Reverend James Hamilton, but this withers out when she realizes he's too nice for her. Adrian, meanwhile, decides to marry Gail Fleming in hopes of drawing Evelyn back, but they go through with signing their divorce papers, too stubborn. It's when Gail is arrested for murdering Peri Westmore that the Powells are left with the question of whether or not they get back together... and the answer goes unrevealed, as one year later Evelyn is seen acting as Marisol's maid of honor. It seems the bride has been kidnapped though, when she doesn't make it down the aisle.

=== Adrian Powell ===
Adrian Powell (Tom Irwin) is the unhappy husband of Evelyn Powell. He and his wife are the employers of murdered maid Flora Hernandez, and their lives start to pique the interest of Marisol Suarez, whose son, Eddie, was falsely arrested for killing the maid. As it turns out, Adrian runs a prostitution business where he hires women to sleep with his friends and then he records the sessions to make his own personal pornography. This hobby disgusts Evelyn, but it's the only way to keep him from leaving her, as he blames her for their son being hit by a car; she looked away from him for just a few seconds. As Marisol digs through the Powells secrets, she works to find out the real killer of Flora Hernandez, but once doing so, she fails to get a proper confession out of him. It's the Powells who get justice for Flora, as they find out Philippe Delatour killed her, and they kill him themselves by poisoning him and throwing him off their balcony. Marisol and the maids add that he confessed to Flora's murder, and the Powells and the maids silently part ways.

Three months pass for the second season and the Powells appear to be in a fairly good place, that is, until their home is robbed during a dinner party and Adrian is left traumatized. Because of this, the couple hire a bodyguard named Tony Bishara, who Evelyn becomes instantly infatuated with. The couple also hire Valentina Diaz as a maid. Evelyn and Tony end up entering an affair, and they work to get Adrian sent off to a mental hospital for a brief period of time so they can be alone together; they just have to worry about Valentina. It's she who basically exposes their affair to Adrian, but when he catches them in the act he realizes how hurt he truly is. Adrian does away with Tony when learning he's really a con artist though, and works to rebuild his marriage with Evelyn. This is only enhanced when Marisol hauls her new husband, Nicholas Deering, who was also once friends with the Powells and make him confess to being the driver that ran over their son fifteen years before. As the Powells cry over this revelation, Marisol takes Nick to turn himself in to the police while Adrian and Evelyn decide to forgive one another for everything.

Four months later, and into the third season, Evelyn and Adrian seem to be happy, but their sex life lacks. Adrian comes to find he has a particular interest in bondage, whereas Evelyn decides she wants to sell their home when the severed leg of tennis pro Louie Becker winds up in their yard. Adrian fails to get Evelyn into his new found S&M lifestyle, and instead blackmails new maid Carmen Luna into joining him. She goes to Evelyn about this though, and it's put to a stop, while Evelyn has decided she desires the love of a child. She decides to foster a son by the name of Deion, who Adrian initially hated, but soon grows fond of. When he's taken away by his birth father though, Evelyn decides to end her marriage with Adrian. However, unforeseen events involving the exposure of their realtor Sebastien Dussault being an exposed as a murderer results in the explosion of their home, leaving Adrian's fate unknown.

A time jump of six months occur, making way for the fourth season, and Evelyn has become trapped in her marriage with Adrian as he fakes paralysis from the home explosion. Though she leaves him when learning the truth, Adrian is determined to make her fall in love with him again and so he works to destroy her life to send her crawling back. He seizes control over their accounts, preventing her from having any money, and she is forced to work for Marisol's maid company as her assistant. Adrian starts to form a friendship with Zoila Diaz, despite finding out she's only pretending to be rich, and later decides to marry Gail Fleming in hopes of drawing Evelyn back, but they go through with signing their divorce papers, too stubborn. It's when Gail is arrested for murdering Peri Westmore that the Powells are left with the question of whether or not they get back together... and the answer goes unrevealed, as one year later Adrian attends Marisol's wedding. He sits in the audience as Evelyn is maid of honor, but the wedding is interrupted as it seems Marisol has been kidnapped.

=== Taylor Stappord ===
Taylor Stappord (Brianna Brown) marries Michael Stappord after they fall in love when she is paid to seduce him by Adrian Powell. Six months into their marriage they take on a new maid, Marisol, who is secretly trying to prove the innocence of her son, Eddie Suarez, who has been accused of murdering maid Flora Hernandez. Marisol becomes a confidante of Taylor's as she struggles to win the side of her husband, whose ex-wife, Olivia, continues to sink her claws into him. She eventually becomes pregnant with Michael's child, and despite some shenanigans pulled by Olivia, everything appears to be going well for the Stappords until Taylor is accidentally shot by a sniper, which was meant to hit Marisol. Taylor winds up losing the baby, and so she convinces Michael to tell Marisol everything he knows about Flora's murder.

After proving her son's innocence, Marisol quits working for the Stappords to resume her previous life, but she remains close friends with Taylor. Early in the second season, Taylor meets with Marisol where she reveals that she and Michael are moving to Washington D.C. and plan to adopt a child once getting settled in.

The Stappords return in time for the third season, however, with a new mysterious daughter in tow. Since moving to D.C. and back to Beverly Hills, Taylor and Michael's relationship has slowly begun to deteriorate, which leads Taylor to having an affair with Sebastien Dussault. Michael pays a friend, Louie Becker, to catch Taylor and Sebastien in the act, but Sebastien accidentally kills Louie and so he and Taylor cover up the murder. As Taylor's life continues to fall apart, with also having to raise the daughter she illegally adopted from Mexico, who she's hiding from a drug cartel, things only get worse as Marisol and new maid Rosie begin digging deeper in Taylor's secrets. Ultimately though, Michael leaves Taylor, but she and her daughter, Katy, flee Beverly Hills and take up new aliases.

=== Michael Stappord ===
Michael Stappord (Brett Cullen) is a Beverly Hills lawyer, once married to interior designer, Olivia Rice. After twenty years of being unhappily married, Michael had an affair with a prostitute named Taylor. They soon fell in love, and so Michael left Olivia to marry her. The Stappords wound up hiring a maid, Marisol; however, she is secretly the mother of the man arrested for Flora Hernandez's murder, and Michael represents the real culprit in the court of law. While also dealing with Olivia lingering in their lives, trying to win Michael back (even attempting suicide at one point to do so), Taylor soon learns she pregnant with Michael's baby. She soon miscarries because of Flora's killer though, Philippe, and Michael tells Marisol everything she wishes to know afterwards.

The Stappords move away early on in the second season, with Michael getting a job in Washington D.C., and telling Taylor that once they're settled in they can look into adopting a child.

By the time of the third season, however, the Stappords return with a new daughter named Katy. Due to the stress of parenting, the Stappords' marriage is now hanging on by a strand, and Michael starts to suspect Taylor is having an affair. This proves to be true, but when Michael's friend sent to spy on Taylor ends up mysteriously murdered, questions begin to arise. The Stappords have two maids during the course of the season, one being Blanca Alvarez, and the other being Rosie Westmore. Both start to look into what the Stappords are hiding, though it turns out Michael is just as clueless as everyone else. Ultimately though, it becomes known that Taylor's lover - Sebastien Dussault - killed both Louie Becker and Blanca Alvarez. When Michael finds out it was Sebastien having an affair with his wife, he swears to kill Sebastien; however, Sebastien proceeds to shoot Michael dead. Taylor and Katy, meanwhile, run away and assume new aliases.

=== Peri Westmore ===
Peri Westmore (Mariana Klaveno) is an up-and-coming actress in Beverly Hills, as well as the wife of soap opera star, Spence Westmore. She and her husband are the employers of maid Rosie Falta, but as Peri is slowly becoming more and more famous, her marriage begins to deteriorate as a result. She neglects her husband and son - Tucker - delving into an affair with her costar. Meanwhile, Spence is busy falling in love with Rosie, and the two of them have an affair too; but when Spence suffers a heart attack, Peri sees the error of her ways and decides to make her marriage work. This fails though, as Spence is already madly in love with Rosie. When Peri commits a hit and run, Rosie decides to give up on trying to see the good in Peri and to run away with Spence, but this changes when Peri brings Rosie's son, Miguel, to America. Rosie tries to end her affair with Spence, but it just so happens this is when Peri learns the truth. As an act of revenge, Peri reports the maid to immigration and has her arrested.

Three months pass by the time of the second season, and Spence has stayed with Peri because he thought Rosie was lost to him forever. When Rosie is released though, she returns to the Westmores. Hoping to sink her claws into Spence and prevent him from leaving her, Peri lies to Spence and claims to be pregnant. Meanwhile, she has a doctor shoot her up with fertility drugs, but Spence decides to end their marriage regardless. Hurt and betrayed, Peri threatens to destroy Spence's career if word gets out that he was sleeping with their maid. She also gains full custody of their son and leaves to film for a movie in Rome.

Peri isn't seen again until the finale of the third season where she returns to Rosie and Spence's life. With Spence currently suffering from amnesia, having forgot the last three years of his life, Peri has Spence convinced that they're still married and Rosie is just their maid.

A total of six months pass going into the fourth season, and Peri has sorted out her story, and has Spence prepared to remarry her. Rosie finds out about this though and attempts to get through to Spence at Peri's party for winning an America's Choice Award. Though this initially fails, Spence regains his memories once Rosie leaves and he gets drunk and publicly confronts Peri for her lies. The following morning, Peri is found murdered in her bedroom and Spence is arrested for the crime. Believing Spence to be innocent, Rosie quests to find out the truth, and soon enough it's learned that Tucker isn't really Spence's son. Peri was raped by a movie director, Hugh Metzger, and he's the biological father. She was also part of a cult known as The Circle, and Peri's true killer was none other than Gail Fleming, Hugh's daughter, who was trying to cover up her father's rape accusations. Rosie has Gail arrested, and Spence is released from prison; however, he remains oblivious to Tucker's true paternity.

=== Spence Westmore ===
Spence Westmore (Grant Show) stars on the daytime soap opera, Love Affairs, and is married to up and coming actress, Peri Westmore. Together the two raise a son, Tucker, though he is primarily under the care of their maid, Rosie Falta. Due to Peri's rise to fame, she and Spence's marriage begins to fall apart as Peri evolves into just another Hollywood diva. As such, Spence winds up entering into an affair with Rosie, who he subsequently starts to fall in love with. Things go well for a while, but Spence eventually suffers from a heart attack. This causes Peri to re-evaluate her choices and decide to fix her marriage with Spence; and Rosie makes Spence put in some effort as well. When Rosie sees just how awful Peri is, however, she decides to run away with Spence and marry him, only for Peri to end up bringing over Rosie's son, Miguel, from Mexico. Refusing to betray Peri after such an act of kindness, Rosie breaks off her engagement to Spence, to his heartbreak, but it's too late, for Peri has discovered their affair. She reports Rosie to immigration as revenge and has her arrested.

Three months later, in the second season, Spence has stayed married to Peri because he had thought Rosie was lost to him forever. When Rosie is released though, Spence attempts to reunite; he ends his marriage with Peri, who had previously faked being pregnant as a way to maintain her grip on him, but she then threatens to destroy his career if word gets out Spence is leaving her for the maid. As such, Spence loses both his wife and Rosie, and Tucker, who Peri has sued for full custody of and is taking to Rome. Spence moves into a new house where he takes on Carmen Luna as a maid, and his nephew, Ty, comes to stay with him when his mother goes out of town. Ty develops feelings for Carmen though, and proves to be dangerous when he tries to poison Spence. Once Ty is asked to leave, Spence learns he's being killed off on Love Affairs and turns to alcohol to cope. Carmen and Rosie convince him to go to rehab, and once he returns, Rosie is there for him and they decide to get married. As they exit the chapel as husband and wife though, Ty commits a drive-by shooting in attempts to kill Valentina Diaz, but accidentally shoots Rosie instead.

The third season is set four months later, and Rosie wakes up from a coma she was put in after the shooting. She and Spence reunite, but quickly discover cracks in their marriage (including Spence's detour into softcore pornography to pay for Rosie's medical bills) as a result of tying the knot so fast Things take a drastic change though when Rosie's first husband, Ernesto Falta, returns to the picture. He had been thought to have been dead the last five years, but apparently this wasn't so. For a while Rosie had chosen to stay with Spence, but ultimately leaves him from Ernesto due to unresolved feelings. Spence is utterly heartbroken. He begins sponsoring Taylor Stappord in AA, and is briefly mistaken to have been having an affair with her. Rosie and Spence eventually get on speaking terms again, and when Rosie learns that Ernesto's time away involved poor choices on his part, she leaves him while he returns to Mexico to correct his wrongdoings. While Rosie had planned to return to Spence though, Ernesto's associate Hector had paid a visit to Spence, putting him in the hospital. As it turns out, Spence lost his memories of the last three years, and Peri shows up to "help" him remember the truth. As far as Spence is concerned, he and Peri are still married, and Rosie is their maid.

Six months pass, making way for the fourth season, and Peri straightens out her story, and has Spence prepared to remarry her. Rosie, who hasn't seen Spence since the hospital, learns about this and crashes one of Peri's parties to get through to him. She triggers a memory by calling him his former petname - "Mr. Spence" - but is gone before Spence trips and hits his head, regaining all of his memories. He proceeds to get drunk and confront Peri, who wakes up murdered the next morning. Spence is promptly arrested, but Rosie believes he is innocent and decides to crack the case herself. While Spence is in jail he becomes acquainted with a prisoner, Kill Face. During Rosie's quest, she learns that Spence isn't Tucker's father, but that Peri was raped by director, Hugh Metzger. She and Spence also get remarried in the prison in order to have conjugal visit. Spence breaks out of jail though when he sees what a toll solving Peri's murder is having on Rosie, but Rosie solves the case just in time before he can be punished. It was in fact Gail Fleming, Hugh's daughter, and she is arrested. Spence returns home where he and Rosie can be together, but Rosie withholds the truth about Tucker's paternity. However, she reveals that she's pregnant, and one year later it's revealed they had a baby.

=== Remi Delatour ===
Remi Delatour (Drew Van Acker) is the son of divorced parents Genevieve and Philippe who moves home to care for his depressed mother. Due to this, maid Valentina is able to pursue a romantic relationship with him, one that goes blessed by Genevieve and unblessed by Zoila. While things are successful at first, Remi calls the whole thing off due to the fact that it's causing a strain on Zoila and Genevieve's friendship. He later gets into cocaine though, and Valentina goes to her mother and they get Philippe to take him to rehab. When he returns home he's grateful for Valentina saving him, and Zoila is now standing aside for them to pursue a relationship. Meanwhile, the truth behind maid Flora Hernandez's murder is starting to come out and it's learned that she was pregnant with Remi's child. Remi, however, finds out that Philippe raped Flora and most likely murdered her and so he decides he cannot handle living in Beverly Hills anymore. He decides to leave for Africa and asks Valentina to go with him, but Zoila gets through to him beforehand and has him go without her. Valentina later learns of this and cuts off contact with her mother going to join Remi.

Three months later, in the second season, Remi remains in Africa while Valentina returns home, the two of them having broken up because Remi's been so busy working there. While Valentina begins getting close with Genevieve's new poolboy Ethan, Remi falls sick and is eventually forced to go home. He tries to win Valentina back, but she chooses Ethan instead; as such, Genevieve agrees to help her son will Valentina over. Cracks start to form in Valentina and Ethan's relationship and it's learned he's part of the robbery gang that's been robbing houses in Beverly Hills. He's stabbed, and so Remi stitches him up, but highly recommends Valentina go to the police. She winds up turning Ethan in while he flees town, and she gets back together with Remi. However, when the two attends Rosie and Spence's wedding, Valentina becomes a target for Ty McKay as he commits a drive-by shooting.

Four months for the third season and Valentina's father Pablo is long dead from the wedding shoot out. Remi, meanwhile, has become over-protective of his girlfriend due to fearing losing her since when gunshots went off he ducked rather than defended her. Remi is later accepted into a university in New York and wants Valentina to come with him and take the fashion internship Adrian got her. Before leaving, he proposes marriage as well as takes her virginity.

=== Sam Alexander ===
Sam Alexander (Wolé Parks) works as the butler and chauffeur of Alejandro Rubio, alongside the maid, Carmen, who he's become infatuated with. Carmen takes advantage of this, using Sam for numerous tasks in hopes of advancing her goal to stardom, not exactly reciprocating the feelings he has for her. This comes as a let down to Sam, but it's when she sees him with another woman that Carmen begins to feel something in return. Sam and Carmen begin seeing each other, but this is short-lived when Carmen realizes that their goals in life don't match up. Sam quits his job for Alejandro, leaving to become a manager, and he returns wanting to make Carmen a star. Carmen is touched by this and the two get back together, deciding to move in with one another, but Carmen is then offered a deal by Alejandro: pose as his wife for two years and he'll have his record company sign her on. She takes the offer, and Sam breaks things off, refusing to wait for her.

=== Genevieve Delatour ===
Genevieve Delatour (Susan Lucci) is Zoila and Valentina's boss, and the mother of Remi.

=== Nicholas Deering ===
Nicholas Deering (Mark Deklin) is Marisol's second husband and the man who ran over Barrett Powell.

=== Opal Sinclair ===
Opal Sinclar (Joanna P. Adler) is Nicholas' maid.

=== Tony Bishara ===
Tony Bishara (Dominic Adams) is the Powells' bodyguard who Evelyn had an affair with.

=== Ethan Sinclair ===
Ethan Sinclair (Colin Woodell) is Opal's son and the leader of a gang of robbers in Beverly Hills.

=== Sebastien Dussault ===
Sebastien Dussault (Gilles Marini) is a married man that Carmen has an affair with.

=== Ernesto Falta ===
Ernesto Falta (Cristián de la Fuente) is Rosie's first husband who was thought to be dead.

=== Jesse Morgan ===
Jesse Morgan (Nathan Owens) is a military veteran who becomes the first male maid for Marisol's placement agency.

=== Daniela Mercado ===
Daniela "Danni" Mercado (Sol Rodriguez) is established as Carmen's daughter in "Terms of Endearment", having been given away as a newborn so that Carmen could pursue her dreams of becoming a singer. Daniela reappears in Carmen's life in "Once More Unto the Bleach", on vacation in Los Angeles, still under the impression that she's the daughter of Carmen's cousin Josefina. Daniela decides to move to Los Angeles permanently in "Another One Wipes the Dust", wanting to pursue her own dreams of stardom, so she convinces Adrian to give her a job as a maid alongside Carmen. Adrian's wife Evelyn later agrees to set Daniela up with a music producer if she seduces Adrian on videotape. In "War and Grease", Carmen grows concerned about Daniela's reckless behavior, so she calls for Josefina to visit. Josefina arrives to take Daniela home in "Sweeping with the Enemy", which interferes with Daniela performing in an upcoming showcase. After Carmen goes behind Josefina's back to let Daniela perform, the two women get into a heated argument and Daniela overhears that Carmen is her biological mother. In "A Time to Spill", Daniela rejects Josefina as her mother, but Carmen salvages the relationship by affirming that nothing has changed between them. Hurt, Daniela returns to Puerto Rico in search of her birth father. Daniela returns in "I Saw the Shine", bringing with her the news that her birth father, Lucas, is dead. A later phone call reveals this to be a lie. In "Much Ado About Buffing", Daniela maintains closeness with Carmen in order to study her, secretly planning to audition for the role based on Carmen in the upcoming film adaptation of Marisol's book. Carmen learns of Daniela's ulterior motives, but chooses to support her daughter when she gets a callback. When meeting with director Hugh Metzger in "Grime and Punishment", Daniela is alerted by Carmen that he has bad intentions, so Daniela switches their drinks when Hugh isn't looking and he falls unconscious. Carmen comes to Daniela's rescue, and the two finally make amends as Carmen embraces Daniela as her daughter. Daniela maintains the secret that her birth father is alive.

== Recurring characters ==
=== Introduced in season one ===
==== Flora Hernandez ====
Flora Hernandez (Paula Garcés) is the maid of Evelyn and Adrian Powell. During a party held at their mansion, Evelyn puts an end to Flora's affair with Adrian, only for Flora to collapse into their pool having just been stabbed. After Flora's lover Eddie Suarez is arrested for the crime, Eddie's mother Marisol takes a job as a maid in order to unveil the real culprit. In "Setting the Table", Marisol discovers a note written by Flora just before she was murdered that reveals she was raped. However, Adrian takes the note and burns it before Marisol can invest any further. Marisol comes to learn that Adrian would hire women to sleep with his married friends in "Wiping Away the Past", and he would secretly record their sessions. Flora was among the women that Adrian would hire. Marisol discovers a positive pregnancy test among Flora's belongings in "Making Your Bed", and Rosie, Carmen, and Zoila reveal that Flora's goal was to become rich off of having a millionaire's baby. In "Taking Out the Trash", it's revealed that Eddie proposed to Flora via email and she turned him down, thus giving him motive to kill. Eddie later recalls Flora was blackmailing someone with a video, which Marisol realizes must be part of Adrian's DVD collection. Once getting a hold of the DVD in "Scrambling the Eggs", Marisol learns that the man who raped Flora is not the same man fathering her unborn child. Marisol visits Flora's grandmother Mirta where she learns that the father was one of Eddie's friends. This is revealed to be Remi Delatour in "Hanging the Drapes", who she now believes to be the culprit. Remi is ruled out as a suspect in "Cleaning Out the Closet", but a connection is established between Remi and Flora's rapist. In "Getting Out the Blood", Marisol deduces that the rapist and killer is Remi's father, Philippe Delatour, and she is set on exposing him in "Totally Clean". Though Marisol fails to get a confession from Philippe, Evelyn and Adrian also piece together that he killed Flora and they take matters into their own hands. Adrian poisons Philippe, and Marisol and the fellow maids act as witnesses to Philippe's confession, thus avenging Flora and getting Eddie exonerated.

In "The Dark at the Top of the Stairs", Marisol is in the process of writing a book about her time as a maid, trying to unveil Flora's killer and get her son exonerated. The book has been published by the start of "Awakenings", and has made the New York Times Best Seller list. The book is in the process of being adapted into a film in "Once More Unto the Bleach", with Eva Longoria cast as Flora.

In earlier versions of the series' pilot, Flora's name was "Florencia Sanchez", but she still preferred being called "Flora" for short.

==== Eddie Suarez ====
Eddie Suarez (Eddie Hassell) caters for a party at the home of Evelyn and Adrian Powell where maid Flora Hernandez is brutally murdered and he winds up framed for the crime, being in possession of the knife used to stab the maid. His mother Marisol takes a job as a maid in order to unveil the true culprit. In "Setting the Table", it's established that Eddie was adopted after Marisol learned she was unable to conceive children, as well as the fact that Eddie had a romantic relationship with Flora. After learning that Flora was pregnant with another man's baby, Eddie's lawyer Ida Hayes meets with the A.D.A. in "Taking Out the Trash" to prove that someone who wasn't Eddie had motive to kill Flora; however, the A.D.A. presents them with emails they discovered that reveal Eddie proposed to Flora, two months after they started dating, and that she rejected him. Marisol berates Eddie for keeping this information from her, but he helps rectify the situation by recalling a phone conversation Flora had where she discussed blackmailing a man she had recorded on video. In "Hanging the Drapes", it's revealed that Eddie supported himself for two years by dealing drugs, and Marisol figures out that the father of Flora's child was one of Eddie's clients, Remi Delatour. Marisol figures out that the killer was in fact Remi's father, Philippe Delatour, and she sets out to expose him in "Totally Clean". Eddie celebrates his liberation with Marisol and her maid friends Rosie, Carmen, and Zoila at the park, only for Rosie to be detained by immigration officials. In "An Ideal Husband", Marisol reveals to her new maid Opal that Eddie has gone back east to finish school.

In earlier versions of the series' pilot, the character framed for Flora's murder is said to be Marisol's husband rather than her son. According to Curtis Kheel, the writers discussed bringing Eddie back during the third season for a storyline with Marisol's new boyfriend Jesse in which he'd have more in common with Jesse than his mother did.

==== Tucker Westmore ====
Tucker Westmore (uncredited baby actors, seasons 1–2; Carter Birchwell, season 4) is the newborn son of Peri and Spence, primarily under the care of maid Rosie Falta. In "Setting the Table", Spence tells Rosie that the reason he stays married to Peri is so that Tucker doesn't grow up the same way he did, caught in the middle of a never-ending custody battle between his parents. Spence proposes the idea of an open marriage to Peri in "Taking Out the Trash", suggesting it be the best way for them to remain together for Tucker's sake. This changes once Rosie tells Spence about Peri's affair, but Rosie encourages Spence to think about what's best for Tucker. In "Minding the Baby", Rosie takes a part-time job as the Powells' maid and brings Tucker to work with her. Evelyn starts to develop an attachment to the baby, and Rosie uses this as a way to snoop around the mansion. Adrian warns Rosie to keep Tucker away from Evelyn in "Scrambling the Eggs", upon learning of his wife's developing attachment for the baby. When Evelyn brings Tucker a birthday gift, she catches Rosie and Spence together and threatens to expose their affair to Peri if Rosie doesn't keep bringing Tucker around. Adrian eventually convinces Evelyn to back down.

Spence finally ends his marriage with Peri in "The Dark at the Top of the Stairs", but she threatens to sue for full custody of Tucker if he continues to see Rosie. Though Spence agrees to Peri's terms, it's revealed in "Betrayal" that Peri went ahead and sued for custody anyway. In "Long Day's Journey Into Night", Spence hears back from his attorney and learns that Peri got full custody. When Tucker's nanny is arrested for shoplifting in "Proof", Peri agrees to reconsider the custody agreement if Spence watches Tucker for a week while her film wraps production. Because Spence is away at rehab, Carmen is forced to take care of him.

In "Once More Unto the Bleach", Tucker is living with both Spence and Peri again, now that they've gotten back together. Peri's sister Shannon gains custody of Tucker in "War and Grease", following Peri's murder and Spence's arrest, and acts as the supervisor of Tucker's trust until he comes of age. Rosie convinces Shannon to hire her as Tucker's nanny. In "The Maid Who Knew Too Much", Tucker and Rosie attend family day at the prison where they are able to see Spence. Benjamin Pacheco, a member of The Circle, later collides with Rosie's car as she's taking Tucker home. The two end up in the hospital with seemingly minimal injuries. Frances, head of The Circle, poisons Ben for involving Tucker in the car accident as he is "the key to everything". Tucker collapses in "Blood, Sweat and Smears", suffering from internal injuries due to the car accident and is in need of surgery. Spence donates his blood for the operation, but he and Tucker have different blood types. As it turns, out Spence is not Tucker's biological father. In "Grime and Punishment", Rosie learns that director Hugh Metzger raped and impregnated Peri with Tucker, and that The Circle knew this, blackmailing him into bankrolling the cult. When Hugh's daughter Gail Fleming is arrested for killing Peri, Spence is exonerated and reunited with Tucker. Rosie reveals that she's pregnant and that Tucker will be a big brother.

In earlier versions of the series' pilot, Tucker's name was "Toby Davis".

==== Odessa Burakov ====
Odessa Burakov (Melinda Page Hamilton) is Alejandro Rubio's Russian house manager.

Hamilton's casting was announced in November 2012. Set to appear in a recurring capacity for the first season, she and Matt Cedeño were expected to be upped to series regulars should the show be renewed for a second season. Though the series was renewed, plans changed and both Hamilton and Cedeño were written off after three episodes.

==== Alejandro Rubio ====
Alejandro Rubio (Matt Cedeño) is a Latin pop singer and Carmen's boss. He is homosexual.

Cedeño's casting was announced in November 2012. Set to appear in a recurring capacity for the first season, he and Melinda Page Hamilton were expected to be upped to series regulars should the show be renewed for a second season. Though the series was renewed, plans changed and both Cedeño and Hamilton were written off after three episodes.

==== Olivia Rice ====
Olivia Rice (Valerie Mahaffey) is Michael's unhinged ex-wife.

==== Ida Hayes ====
Ida Hayes (Maria Howell) is Marisol's lawyer.

==== Pablo Diaz ====
Pablo Diaz (Alex Hernandez) is Zoila's husband. Briefly separated for a time because he felt they needed space. He saw a woman named Helen from his work for a time being.

==== Philippe Delatour ====
Philippe Delatour (Stephen Collins) is Genevieve's ex-husband, and the man who killed Flora Hernandez.

==== Miguel Falta ====
Miguel Falta (Octavio Westwood, seasons 1–2; Alejandro Vera, seasons 3-4) is Rosie's son.

=== Introduced in season two ===
==== Dahlia Deering ====
Dahlia Deering (Susie Abromeit) is Nicholas' deceased wife who was pushed off a bridge by Opal. Had an affair with Opal while married to Nicholas that she called an “experiment.”

==== Reggie Miller ====
Reggie Miller (Reggie Austin) is Rosie's immigration lawyer and love interest. He’s Kenneth executor for his finances and his nephew.

==== Kenneth Miller ====
Kenneth Miller (Willie C. Carpenter) is Rosie's paraplegic boss and Reggie's uncle.

==== Didi Miller ====
Didi Miller (Tiffany Hines) is Kenneth's second wife, a former stripper.

==== Lucinda Miller ====
Lucinda Miller (Kimberly Hebert Gregory) is Kenneth's daughter, an aspiring artist. She fell pregnant at age 15 and her father forced her to put her daughter up for adoption. She reconnected with her daughter with the help of Rosie.

==== Ty McKay ====
Ty McKay (Gideon Glick) is Spence's nephew and part of the masked gang of robbers in Beverly Hills. Found laying at Alejandro’s memorial. Becomes infatuated with Carmen when he comes to live with Spence.

==== Javier Mendoza ====
Javier Mendoza (Ivan Hernandez) is a professional chef who almost married Zoila.

==== Carter and Jason ====
Carter (Alexander Biglane) and Jason (Sean Flynn) are part of the gang of robbers in Beverly Hills. Carter killed Alejandro Rubio.

==== Rick Dresden ====
Rick Dresden (Deke Anderson) is Adrian's private investigator.

=== Introduced in season three ===
==== Jerry ====
Jerry (Alec Mapa) is Rosie's nurse.

==== Gail Fleming ====
Gail Metzger Fleming (Julie Claire) is a Beverly Hills socialite who murdered Peri Westmore.

==== Blanca Alvarez ====
Blanca Alvarez (Naya Rivera) is a maid in Beverly Hills who is kidnapped and killed.

==== Katy Stappord ====
Katy Stappord (Grecia Merino) is Taylor and Michael's adopted daughter with a mysterious past.

==== Louie Becker ====
Louie Becker (Eddie Mills) is a tennis pro who winds up dead.

==== Christopher Neff ====
Christopher Neff (John O'Hurley) is a doctor who Genevieve almost marries.

==== Jacklyn Dussault ====
Jacklyn Dussault (Michelle Hurd)

==== Deion ====
Deion (Issac Ryan Brown) is Evelyn and Adrian's foster son.

==== Joy ====
Joy (Joy Osmanski) is Dr. Neff's maid and Zoila's rival.

==== Party Goer ====
Party Goer (Janine LaManna) is attending the celebration hosted by the Powells in honor of Marisol's new book.

=== Introduced in season four ===
==== Benjamin Pacheco ====
Benjamin "Ben" Pacheco (Carlos Ponce) is a member of The Circle, in cahoots with Peri.

==== Peter Hudson ====
Peter Hudson (James Denton) is the head of the movie studio producing the film adaptation of Marisol's book. He's also Genevieve's former husband.

==== Kyle ====
Kyle (Ryan McPartlin) is Zoila's neighbor.

==== Frances ====
Frances (Stephanie Faracy) is Kyle's mother and the head of The Circle.

==== Shannon Greene ====
Shannon Greene (Katherine LaNasa) is Peri's sister.

==== Kill Face ====
Stuart "Kill Face" Pearlman (Owen Harn) is a fellow inmate Spence befriends in prison.

==== Hugh Metzger ====
Hugh Metzger (Sam McMurray)

==== James Hamilton ====
James Hamilton (Sean Blakemore) is a local reverend who hires Marisol's maid placement agency to cater his annual gala in "A Time to Spill". During the event he becomes infatuated by Evelyn Powell, asking her out on a date at the end of the evening. In "The Maid Who Knew Too Much", James and Evelyn begin seeing each other regularly, and Evelyn's estranged husband Adrian tries to bribe James to stop seeing her. James accepts the check, but he gives it to Evelyn so she can finally hire a good divorce lawyer and escape her marriage. Evelyn meets with an attorney in "Blood, Sweat and Smears" who informs her that she must move back into the mansion if she plans to take anything in the divorce. As such, James assists Evelyn in breaking back into her home, and Evelyn informs Adrian that James will be around more often. Hoping to drive a wedge between James and Evelyn in "I Saw the Shine", Adrian calls for his PI to look into James' background. In "Much Ado About Buffing", however, James ends his relationship with Evelyn upon seeing she still has feelings for Adrian.

Blakemore's casting was announced in March 2016.
