= Devious Maids season 4 =

Devious Maids
- Season 4
- Season promotional art
- Starring: Ana Ortiz; Dania Ramirez; Roselyn Sánchez; Judy Reyes; Rebecca Wisocky; Tom Irwin; Grant Show; Nathan Owens; Sol Rodríguez; Susan Lucci
- No. of episodes: 10

Release
- Original network: Lifetime
- Original release: June 6 – August 8, 2016

Season chronology
- ← Previous; Season 3

The fourth and final season of the American television comedy-drama series Devious Maids was ordered on September 24, 2015. Filming began January 14, 2016, with episode titles being cleaning puns. It consisted of 10 episodes, airing from June 6 through August 8, 2016.

== Plot ==
This season, Marisol finds herself acting as a support system to Evelyn (Rebecca Wisocky) in the wake of a big life change. Meanwhile, Rosie's positive and sunny disposition leaves much to be desired by her new boss, Genevieve (Susan Lucci) who is acclimating to a household without Zoila's honest and acerbic humor. Carmen continues to pursue her singing career until her cousin's daughter, Daniela (Sol Rodriguez) comes to town and shakes things up. Marisol also finds herself in a new relationship, which eventually becomes a complicated triangle when her old flame Jesse. Adrian tries to punish Evelyn for leaving him

== Production ==
Devious Maids was renewed for a fourth season on September 24, 2015, which would have 10 episodes unlike previous seasons which consisted of 13 episodes. Episode titles of this season are cleaning puns. For the fourth season, series regulars Brianna Brown (Taylor Stappord), Brett Cullen (Michael Stappord) and Gilles Marini (Sebastien Dussault) are demoted, and will not appear in the season. It was announced on Twitter that Mariana Klaveno will return as Peri Westmore for the fourth season. Deadline announced on January 12, 2016, that Eva Longoria would be making an appearance as herself in the season premiere. It was also announced that James Denton was cast for the show as Peter, the charming confident head of a movie studio who falls hard and fast into a new relationship this season. Sol Rodriguez was added as a series regular, playing Carmen's cousin Daniela, and Nathan Owens was to return as series regular.

Ryan McPartlin was announced on January 20, 2016, to be cast as Kyle, a sweet, fun, and impossibly sexy new neighbor. TheWrap reported that Julie Claire will return as Gail Flemming for the fourth season. TVLine reported on February 3, 2016, that Carlos Ponce had been added to the show as Ben, a "handsome and slick" manager of a major movie star. Scott Takeda announced himself on Twitter that he would be appearing in the fourth season of Devious Maids as Dr. Brooks.

== Cast ==
=== Main ===
- Ana Ortiz as Marisol Suarez
- Dania Ramirez as Rosie Westmore/Falta
- Roselyn Sánchez as Carmen Luna
- Judy Reyes as Zoila Diaz
- Rebecca Wisocky as Evelyn Powell
- Tom Irwin as Adrian Powell
- Susan Lucci as Genevieve Delatour
- Grant Show as Spence Westmore
- Nathan Owens as Jesse Morgan
- Sol Rodriguez as Daniela Mercado

=== Recurring ===
- Ryan McPartlin as Kyle
- James Denton as Peter Hudson
- Carlos Ponce as Benjamin "Ben" Pacheco
- Stephanie Faracy as Frances
- Carter Birchwell as Tucker Westmore
- Julie Claire as Gail Flemming
- Owen Harn as Stuart "Kill Face" Pearlman
- Katherine LaNasa as Shannon Greene
- Sam McMurray as Hugh Metzger
- Sean Blakemore as Reverend James Hamilton
- Alejandro Vera as Miguel Falta
- Christopher Hanke as Fabian
- April Parker Jones as Detective Shaw
- Kate Beahan as Fiona Gladhart

=== Guest ===
- Mariana Klaveno as Peri Westmore
- Elizabeth Rodriguez as Josefina Mercado
- Deke Anderson as Rick Dresden
- Sharon Lawrence as Lori
- Scott Takeda as Dr. Brooks
- Eva Longoria as herself

== Episodes ==
No. overall	No. in season	Title	Directed by	Written by	Original release date	US viewers (millions)
40	1	"Once More Unto the Bleach"	David Warren	Brian Tanen	June 6, 2016	1.08
Six months later, Adrian survived the explosion but became paralyzed. Zoila survived but lost the baby. Spence has been brainwashed by Perri to hate Rosie and he has no recollection of their romance or life together. Marisol is making a movie based upon her book and is stuck working with an obnoxious Perri. She complains to the head of the studio, Peter, with whom she strikes a liking to. Rosie has been working at Genevieve's house, which greatly annoys her as their personalities do not clash. Jesse is back working for Perri, and reveals to Marisol that he never left. Zoila tries to go back to work for Genevieve, but cannot stand to be around her as she feels that Genevieve made the wrong decision, choosing her life over her daughter's. Carmen is still working for the Powells and is surprised by the visit of her cousin, Dani, who is really her daughter she gave up for adoption. Dani is much like Carmen and Carmen initially struggles with her being there, but decides to let her stay. Evelyn wants to divorce Adrian, but cannot for fear of looking bad as Adrian is disabled. However, Carmen finds out that he is faking it to stay with her, while he finds out Dani is her daughter. Zoila gets a job house sitting at a rich house where she meets Kyle and pretends to own the house. Rosie tries to make Spence remember their romance but he does not, whenever he begins to remember things, Perri has a friend, Ben, talk to him, and then he forgets it all. Perri is seen frantically looking for Ben. After Rosie confronts Spence, he falls and remembers everything. Upset about the lies, he gets drunk and gets into a violent altercation with Perri. He wakes up the next morning to find Perri murdered right next to him.
41	2	"Another One Wipes the Dust"	David Warren	Curtis Kheel	June 13, 2016	1.07
Spence is arrested for Perri's murder as he cannot remember what happened due to getting blackout drunk. This leads Rosie to begin investigating the night Perri died and looking for an alibi for Spence. Genevieve wants to rekindle her romance with her old husband, Pete, who is interested in Marisol. Genevieve asks Marisol to not see Pete and let her have him, but she refuses, so Genevieve promises her war. Peter reveals that he left Genevieve since she cheated on him. Evelyn wants to divorce Adrian, but cannot for her fear of her reputation. So, she hires Dani to seduce Adrian so she will not look like the bad one. Adrian refuses Dani's advances but in the process Evelyn learns he can walk and she moves out after making a scene about the ordeal at the country club. Carmen worries about controlling Daniela after she begins acting wild, not wanting to end up with Dani hating her. Spence meets again with Ben, who gives him something to drink before he is questioned. Zoila begins dating Kyle, but is surprised when he is living with his mother, Frances, who he is extremely close with. Kyle later confesses to his mother that he likes Zoila a lot, but she replies that she has better plans for him and his life. Rosie finds an alibi for Spence, but is horrified to hear that he has confessed to the murder, having Ben help him realize he did it.
42	3	"War and Grease"	Mary Lou Belli	Davah Avena	June 20, 2016	0.81
Kyle breaks up with Zoila. Genevieve is at war with Marisol, causing her trouble in all aspects of her life. Marisol, having had enough, begins fighting back with her. Dani continues to act recklessly, doing drugs, and sleeping around, but Carmen is hesitant to control her. Frances, believing Zoila is rich, invites her to several high society gatherings, which leads to Zoila being expected to throw her own. Evelyn's plan for divorce is thwarted when Adrian cuts off her funding and prevents her from meeting with any divorce lawyers. Rosie and Jesse are forced to deal with the arrival of Perri's even more evil sister, Shannon. Spence asks Rosie to be in Tucker's life and she and Jesse must orchestrate her into it. Ben hires a prison guard to listen to all of Rosie and Spence's conversations, which leads to Ben kidnapping Cinnamon - Spence's alibi. Genevieve and Marisol come to a truce while Zoila and Carmen have a falling out, after Zoila belittles her at her party. Evelyn moves in with Marisol, while Carmen calls Josefina and invites her to LA. Rosie learns Cinnamon is missing and it is revealed that Ben is working with Shannon.
43	4	"Sweeping with the Enemy"	Mary Lou Belli	Ric Swartzlander	June 27, 2016	0.96
Marisol deals with living with Evelyn, who imposes on her time and is also using her money. Marisol demands that she either go back to Adrian or get a job. Daniela and Carmen's relationship takes a turn when Dani's mother appears. She wants to take Dani back home, which interferes with a showcase Dani has planned. Zoila gets setup on a blind date with Adrian by Frances. Marisol's business begins struggling. Feeling incredibly lonely, Genevieve tries to befriend Rosie. Rosie begins investigating Shannon and Ben, for whom she knows is brainwashing Spence, hears him mention something called The Circle. Spence learns the inmates are fans of his just as he begins to doubt he really killed Perri. Rosie's investigation makes her miss her dinner with Genevieve, pushing Genevieve to befriend her hairdresser, Fabien. Evelyn ends up in jail for using Marisol's credit card and ends up developing a real friendship with Marisol, who offers her a job as she handles clients in a way Marisol cannot. Rosie also learns Shannon and Ben are lovers. Adrian, liking a challenge, tells Zoila he will actively court her. Jesse and Dani have a fling, that he wishes to be more. Carmen allows Dani to go to her showcase, making her realize Dani's talent. A loud fight between Carmen and Josefina leads to Dani finding out Carmen is her real mother. Fabien later invites Genevieve to read join a group offriends” that he has and shows her a book called “Completing the Circle”. Rosie shares with Spence about The Circle, perplexed, as Spence collapses.
44	5	"A Time to Spill"	David Grossman	Sheila Lawrence	July 4, 2016	0.94
Spence is going through withdrawals, having been drugged by Ben to confess. Rosie goes to the police with this information, but she is laughed away. Kyle becomes jealous of Zoila and Adrian. Evelyn begins working well for Marisol, but is upset when she's asked to work a gala for Marisol and Pete because she’ll have to see Adrian while working. Dani is angry at Josefina, but not Carmen, and tells Josefina they are not family, so Josefina leaves town. Genevieve is surprised when Fabien, who she thought was gay, kisses her. Rosie wants to catch Ben in the act of drugging Spence, so she plots an encounter between them. Ben takes the bait and Rosie records the whole thing. However, they are surprised to learn he didn't drug Spence, having figured out their plan. Genevieve confronts Fabien and shares that she doesn't want to date him and that she didn't like the book, which angers him. Adrian confronts Evelyn at the gala, so Evelyn outs Zoila's true identity. Adrian, is intrigued by Zoila and wants to help her so he will not reveal her secret. Dani wants to be close with Carmen, who brushes her off and sends her to Josefina. Pete reveals to Marisol that her movie is back in production and she will be writing the new script. Evelyn is asked on a date. Kyle and Zoila get back together, but plan to keep it from Frances. Dani plots to find her real dad. Rosie, feeling like Ben is always one step ahead of her, confides in Genevieve about him and The Circle. Genevieve shares with her that Fabien's book (which she didn't like) must be connected and exclaims that it sounds like a cult. Ben is talking to an unseen man, questioning why he was given a placebo to drug Spence with. It is revealed he is talking to Kyle, who is in charge of The Circle with “Mother”.
45	6	"The Maid Who Knew Too Much"	David Grossman	Jessica Kivnik & David Grubstick	July 11, 2016	1.03
A little while later, Zoila wants to come out about her relationship with Kyle, who still won't and throws her out his room so Frances doesn't see him. However, Zoila hears them mention a problem with Ben. Carmen is sad about turning forty. Kill Face pressures Spence to put on their play for family day, and tells him to invite his. Rosie contacts Fabien and tries to learn about The Circle. He shares with her that she doesn't fit the bill, it's only for celebrities and high society people, and that Perri was in it. To learn about it, Rosie and Jesse plan to get Genevieve to join the cult and she accepts. Marisol butts heads with the new director of her movie who doesn't understand her vision and wants the movie to be brainless and not about female empowerment. Evelyn goes on a date with Reverend James while Gale hits on Adrian. Mother warns Ben to take care of Rosie or risk disappointing her again. She warns him if someone reveals the truth about Perri's murder, then they are all at risk. Carmen attends a casting call meant for Dani, where she feels bad about her age in the business. Genevieve calls Fabien and pretends to want to join the cult, he accepts and puts her through a screening process to make sure she's committed. Frances catches Zoila and Kyle after sex, and forbids Zoila from ever coming back. Genevieve shares to Rosie that she had to reveal her secrets on film to be initiated into The Circle. Rosie plans to find the tape. Evelyn wants to become a better person while dating James. The director, Hugh, Marisol is struggling with wants her off the project, so Peter fires her. Kyle confronts Frances about liking Zoila and seemingly leaves The Circle. Carmen has sex with Doug the barista. Ben runs into Rosie and Tucker's car at a very high speed and puts them in the hospital with minor injuries. Peter tries to make it up to Marisol, but can't and she makes him leave. Adrian bribes James to leave Evelyn, but he just gives her the check to divorce him and stays with her. Kyle moves in with Zoila. Rosie shares with Jesse she is getting close. Mother is mad that Tucker was in the car with Rosie, saying he is the key to everything. She then poisons him and kills him for disappointing her.
46	7	"Blood, Sweat, and Smears"	Elodie Keene	Davah Avena & Amelia Sims	July 18, 2016	0.82
Zoila is mad/worried that Genevieve, has joined a cult specializing in mind control and has Rosie advise her to quit. Carmen shares that Doug is the best sex she's ever had. Evelyn begins working on her divorce and is told she has to move back in with Adrian or it’ll look like she abandoned the marriage. Jesse is starting his own training business. Tucker collapses and at the hospital Rosie and Shannon are told that he had internal injuries from the car crash. Tucker needs blood for a surgery, Rosie suggests from Spence, but Shannon won’t allow it. Rosie asks Spence to donate anyway. Carmen continues to have sex with Doug; while there she is scared to see he had been stalking her. Kyle has baby like tendencies, alarming Zoila who feels like she's his mother. Genevieve tries to get Zoila back into her life, by pretending to be brainwashed, but Zoila realizes Genevieve's deceit. Zoila tells her she’ll never forgive her for what happened to the baby and that she will not come running again. So Spence can get back into the hospital and give Tucker blood, Kill Face shivs him. Evelyn and James break back into the Powell Mansion so Evelyn can move back in. Adrian and Zoila bond over the loss of their children, with Adrian wishing he and Evelyn were happy. This leads Zoila to forgive Genevieve and they become friends again. Rosie follows Shannon to see where The Circle meets when she runs into Kyle. After a disastrous dinner as friends, Jesse and Marisol talk about their past leading them to have sex. Carmen breaks up with Doug, leading him to call Dani and give her information about her father. Zoila begins to have feelings for Adrian. Rosie is horrified to learn that Spence isn't Tucker's real father.
47	8	"I Saw the Shine"	Elodie Keene	David Grubstick	July 25, 2016	0.87
Adrian and Evelyn are refusing to speak to each other, stressing out Carmen. Shannon is upset that Ben has gone missing. She begins to question if Spence is the killer, but Frances promises her The Circle will make her a star, just like they did for Perri. Marisol wants to break things off with Jesse, wanting to be with Peter, but he doesn't want to, as he has feelings for her. Zoila tries to break up with Kyle, who is catching onto her secret, but has trouble. Adrian, upset that Carmen let Evelyn back into the house, fires her. In retaliation, Evelyn hires her to irritate Adrian. Adrian hires Dani as his new maid. Genevieve hires Jesse as her trainer and begins hitting on him. Peter turns over a new leaf and he and Marisol make up. Rosie begins to realize the prison guard has been spying on her and is a part of The Circle, so she wants to get a conjugal visit with Spence. After having had their marriage annulled due to Ernesto, they get remarried. Kyle, realizing The Circle is all about worshiping Mother, announces to Shannon that he's quit. He also reveals to her that The Circle didn't make Perri famous, and that she has been played. Remarried, Rosie cannot bear to tell Spence the truth about Tucker. Dani tells Carmen that she found her father named Lucas. Lucas and Carmen were madly in love and he is dead now, something they are both horrified about. Zoila, wanting to dump Kyle, teams with Frances by starting a fire at Frances' home to get him to move back in with her and he does. The firemen want to check their attic, but both Kyle and Frances are very adamant against it, raising suspicion from Zoila. Rosie confronts Shannon about Perri's murder and Tucker's real father. Shannon, disillusioned by the Circle, doesn't know who it is, except that the man was a big wig in the movie business and that Perri was raped. Genevieve “reveals” to Peter about Marisol and Jesse’s hookup, making Peter concerned. Carmen breaks down about Lucas' death as he was her first and only love and seeks solace in Evelyn, who confesses that Adrian was also her first and only love. Evelyn shares that when she thought he had died, she was heartbroken, but that she has now found a new love and Carmen will too. Adrian hires a PI to find out what James is hiding. Jesse stops by to try to win over Marisol, not wanting the relationship Dani offers, but she sends him away. Outside Peter's assistant reports to Peter that she is seeing Jesse again, as Peter is seen holding an engagement ring. Carmen reveals to Dani that Lucas was the best man she ever knew, but that she left him and didn't tell him she was pregnant because she wanted to be a star. Dani, unmoved, then makes a call to Lucas, who is alive, and tells him Carmen does not want to see him. Kyle tries to leave The Circle, but Frances says he is too involved and must take care of Ben's body. Fiona, the woman Zoila is house sitting for, returns home early.
48	9	"Much Ado About Buffing"	Victor Nelli, Jr.	Curtis Kheel	August 1, 2016	0.78
Zoila faces a new normal as she deals with her boss, Fiona, who is awful to her. Dani invites Carmen to dinner. Miguel uses Spence being in jail to threaten students and teachers at school, so she asks Spence to get him in a scared straight tour of the prison. Miguel reveals he has just missed Rosie. Peter is mad that Marisol slept with Jesse, so he cuts all ties with her. Zoila notes When Kyle and Frances are going to be out of the house and plans to look for the recording that reveals Perri's killer. Casting is underway for Marisol's movie and Carmen plans to audition for the role based on herself. Adrian's PI finds nothing bad about James. Marisol, mad at Genevieve for ruining her relationship with Peter, calls her out for being a truly mean person and tells her she will always be alone. Dani reveals to Jesse that the reason she invited Carmen to dinner was to study her and steal the role of Carmen from her and that she hasn't forgiven her. Zoila is stuck working for her boss late and runs out of time when searching through Frances' house, causing a run in with her and Kyle. Evelyn begins to miss Adrian, feeling that James is too well behaved for her. Thrown off by Dani, Carmen blows her audition, revealing she knows Marisol, Hugh dismisses her. Frances confronts Zoila for not dumping Kyle when Fiona outs Zoila as her maid. Gale tries to rape Adrian, and is caught in a compromising position by Evelyn. Kyle confronts Zoila about being a maid, she tells him she knows about The Circle and asks him for help in retrieving Perri's tape. Initially refusing, Kyle confronts Mother about Perri's death, she explains it away saying that Ben's drugs just gave him a push to his confession and protected The Circle. She then tells Kyle that Zoila has infiltrated The Circle and he must handle her. Zoila is horrified to find out that Kyle and Frances moved out in the middle of the night and her and Rosie's chance to get Spence out of jail is gone. Dani gets a callback audition. Realizing Evelyn is not over Adrian, James breaks up with her. Spence tells Rosie to give up the fight for his innocence, just as Kill Face reveals that whenever they put on a play, he used tools, and has built a tunnel for them to escape. Adrian, realizing Evelyn must still love him, plays into Gale’s “feelings” and professes his love for her. Genevieve apologizes to Marisol, and says she acts crazy about Peter as she is trying to make up for cheating on him, saying she never meant to cheat. She reveals that she was at a party and then woke up in another man's arms. Marisol helps her realize that she was drugged and raped and Genevieve reveals it was by a well known man in Hollywood. Genevieve reveals the identity of the man as Hugh, just as Dani walks into his office... alone.
49	10	"Grime and Punishment"	Victor Nelli, Jr.	Brian Tanen	August 8, 2016	0.86
Adrian, realizing Evelyn still loves him and trying to bother her, gives her everything she wants in the divorce settlement, and announces his engagement to Gale. Rosie and Marisol reveal to the group that Hugh is a rapist and Carmen quickly warns Dani not to trust Hugh, right as he is giving her the part and attempting to drug her. Genevieve goes to a new therapist where she meets a woman, Lori, a lesbian, who is much like her and understands her problems. Evelyn tells Marisol she needs to get closure with Peter which helps realizes Adrian's goal and decides to play chicken with him. Rosie and Jesse are horrified when police and a SWAT team storm the house; Spence has escaped from prison and they are informed that if they find him, they'll shoot to kill. Dani calls Carmen horrified as she switched her and Hugh's glasses when he wasn't looking and he passed out. Carmen calls Rosie and they plan to make him talk. Marisol apologizes to Peter and begs for him to take her back, to no avail. Fiona finds a letter addressed to Zoila with no return address and throws it away. Fiona tells Zoila she saw Kyle next door, she rushes to find him but instead finds Spence and Kill Face hiding out. Evelyn convinces Gale to turn her Engagement Party into a surprise wedding. Genevieve gains closure with Peter and encourages him to go back to Marisol. Carmen, Dani and Rosie force Hugh to reveal that Perri confessed what happened to her to the cult and that The Circle has been blackmailing him to fund the cult for years. He goes on to say that the night she was murdered, when she was looking for Ben, she saw Hugh about to rape someone. Perri believed she was the only one and the thought of him doing it again, she was ready to destroy him. Hugh told Ben that she couldn't turn him, which would destroy The Circle’s funding. Hugh swears he did not kill Perri, believing Spence did. He then realizes it was a certain woman who did and before he reveals who he has a heart attack. Zoila finds her piece of mail and Kyle has sent her Perri's flash drive. Dani apologizes, realizing Carmen wants to be Dani's mother and they decide to start over and have a real mother-daughter relationship. Carmen wishes Lucas was there to see it and Dani gulps. Perri's 9 hour confessional reveals that she was going to turn Hugh in, but Hugh sent his daughter to do his dirty work and promised Hugh would turn her into a star. It is then revealed that Gale is Hugh's daughter and the killer. Fiona realizes that Spence is hiding out across the street, she attempts to call the police and fires Zoila who runs off with her phone. With both Adrian and Evelyn not wanting to bow out first, the two divorce, but then soon after kiss and reunite in passion. Rosie confronts Gale at the party laying out what happened. Gale tried to cover for her father yet again, but this time she could not convince Perri to be quiet. Not wanting her family to be torn apart, she murdered Perri. Gale admits to killing Perri, happy she did it, but says that Rosie is just a "dumb maid" and nobody would believe her story. The police burst in and arrest Gale, since Rosie is wearing a wire, capturing the whole story. Zoila pleads to Spence and Kill Face to leave, Kill Face thinks Zoila ratted them out and tries to shoot her. Spence wrestles the gun away and is shot, but the bullet didn't hit any major organs. He is cleared of all charges. Adrian and Evelyn, both now single but in love again, wonder if they are married or divorced now. Peter finds Marisol and proposes to her and she accepts. Zoila gets her job back at Genevieve's and they promise no more meddling, just as Genevieve leaves for a date with Lori, saying she should try a wife this time. Rosie reveals to Spence she is pregnant. One year later, everyone is at Marisol and Pete's wedding. Adrian is seen giving Zoila a funny look. However, Marisol never comes down the aisle. Carmen, Rosie, and Zoila go to Marisol's bridal room to look for her where they find the window broken in several shards with blood everywhere. Horrified at Marisol's disappearance, Rosie says she doesn't think Marisol got cold feet.

== Ratings ==
=== U.S. ratings ===
No. in series	No. in season	Episode	Air date	Time slot (EST)	Rating/share (18–49)	Viewers (m)	Rank (18–49)
40	1	"Once More Unto the Bleach"	June 6, 2016	Mondays; 9:00 p.m.	0.3	1.08	54
41	2	"Another One Wipes the Dust"	June 13, 2016	Mondays; 9:00 p.m.	0.3	1.07	69
42	3	"War and Grease"	June 20, 2016	Mondays; 9:00 p.m.	0.3	0.82	—N/a
43	4	"Sweeping with the Enemy"	June 27, 2016	Mondays; 9:00 p.m.	0.3	0.96	—N/a
44	5	"A Time to Spill"	July 4, 2016	Mondays; 9:00 p.m.	0.3	0.94	—N/a
45	6	"The Maid Who Knew Too Much"	July 11, 2016	Mondays; 9:00 p.m.	0.3	1.03	—N/a
46	7	"Blood, Sweat, and Smears"	July 18, 2016	Mondays; 9:00 p.m.	0.3	0.82	—N/a
47	8	"I Saw the Shine"	July 25, 2016	Mondays; 9:00 p.m.	0.3	0.87	—N/a
48	9	"Much Ado About Buffing"	August 1, 2016	Mondays; 9:00 p.m.	0.3	0.78	—N/a
49	10	"Grime and Punishment"	August 8, 2016	Mondays; 9:00 p.m.	0.3	0.86	—N/a
