= Dania Ramirez =

Dominican actress (born 1979)

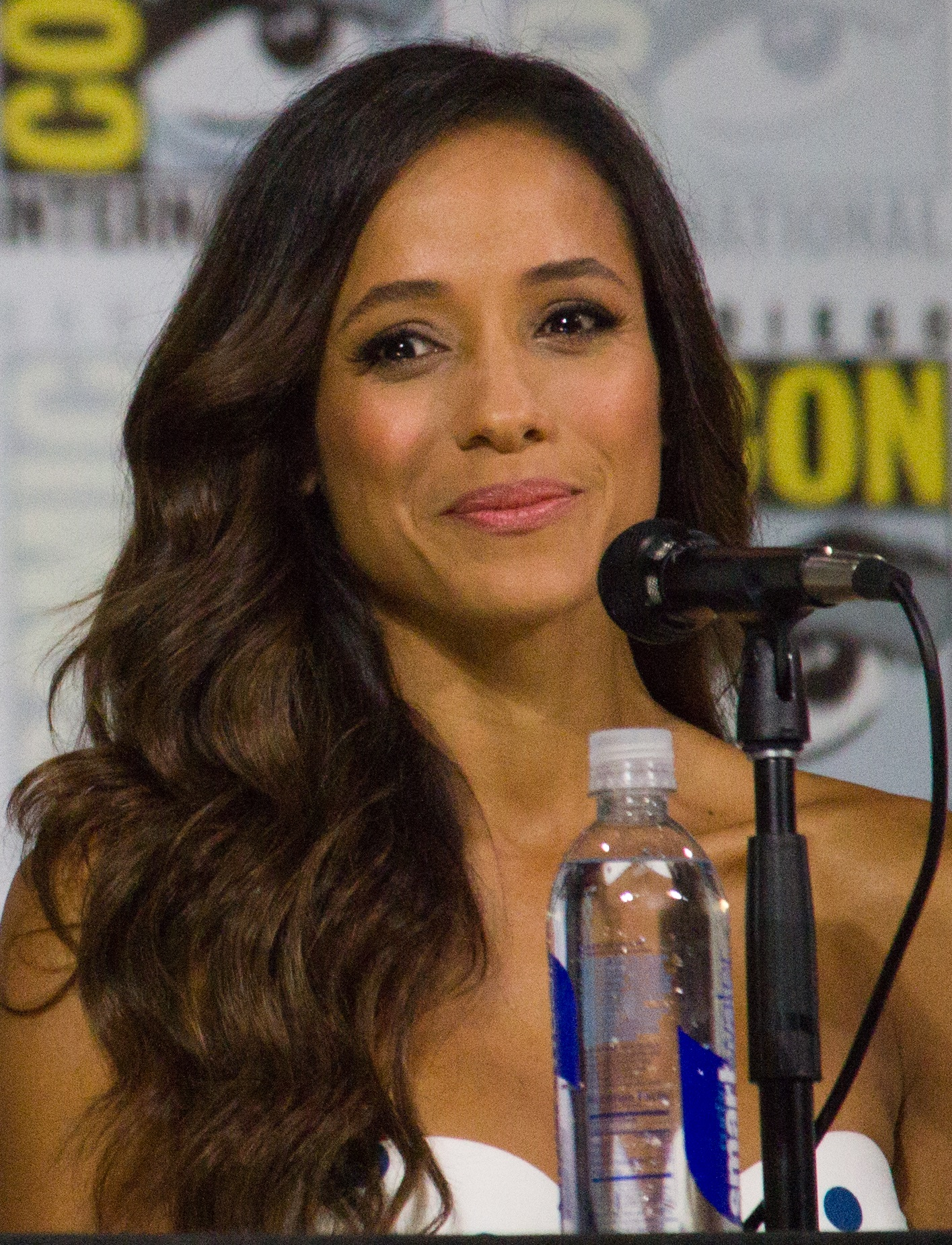
- Ramirez at the 2017 San Diego Comic Con
- Born: November 8, 1979 (age 47); Santo Domingo, Dominican Republic
- Education: Montclair State University
- Occupation: Actress
- Years active: 1997–present
- Known for: Heroes; Devious Maids
- Spouse: Bev Land (m. 2013)
- Children: 2

Dania Ramirez (born November 8, 1979) is a Dominican actress. Her credits include the roles of Maya Herrera in the NBC series Heroes, Alex in the HBO series Entourage, and Blanca during the last season of the HBO crime drama The Sopranos on television. Her film roles include Alex Guerrero in She Hate Me and Callisto in the feature film X-Men: The Last Stand. She portrayed Rosie Falta on Lifetime's Devious Maids from June 2013, until its cancellation in 2016. In July 2017, Ramirez joined the ABC series Once Upon a Time for its softly-rebooted seventh season in a starring role as Cinderella. In 2023, she began the starring role of Captain Nikki Batista in the Fox crime drama Alert: Missing Persons Unit.

== Early life and education ==
Ramirez was born in Santo Domingo. At an early age, she decided to become an actress. As a young child, she would reenact telenovelas for her family. She was discovered by a modeling scout while working in a convenience store at the age of 15, and was offered a small part in a soda commercial. Later, she decided to pursue acting seriously and studied at the Actor's Workshop in New York City under Flo Greenberg.

At 16 years old, Ramirez started at Montclair State University, where her volleyball talents led her to be placed among the top five in career digs, digs/game, solo blocks and total blocks. She graduated in 2000. After graduation, Ramirez moved to Los Angeles to pursue her acting career.

== Career ==
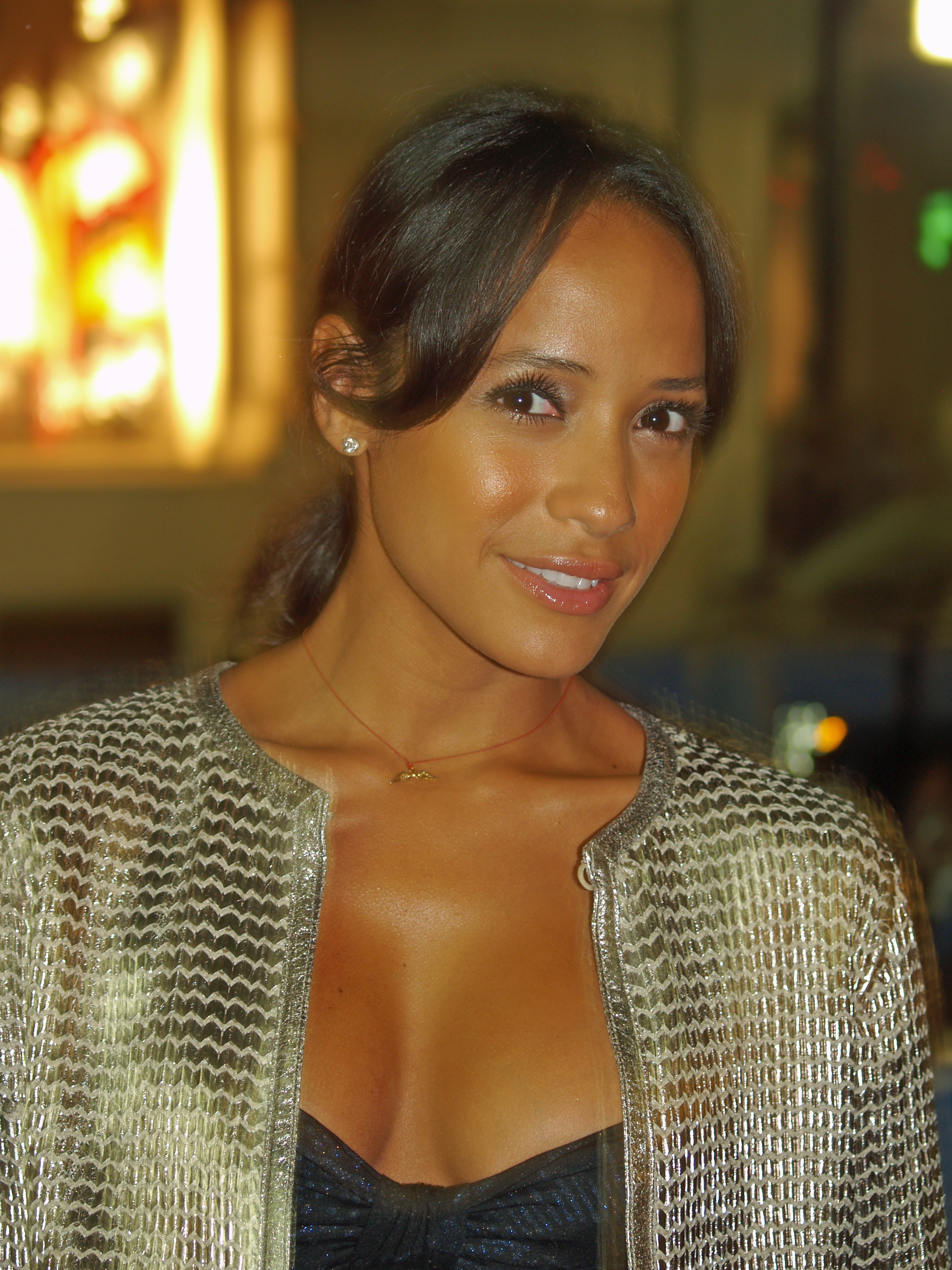
Ramirez at the Spring 2009 collection Mercedes-Benz Fashion Week.

=== Music videos ===
Ramirez has appeared in several music videos, including Jay-Z's Streets is Watching (1998), De La Soul's "All Good?" feat. Chaka Khan (2000), Enrique Iglesias' "Could I Have This Kiss Forever" (2000), LL Cool J's "Hush" (2005), Santana's "Into the Night" (2007), as well as "Cry Baby Cry" (a collaboration of Santana and Sean Paul). Ramirez appeared in Wisin & Yandel's music video "Dime Qué Te Pasó", in which she played the main character, the wife and mother of a military man in Iraq who finds out her husband died at war. She was also featured in hip-hop group Sporty Thievz's video "Cheapskate" in 1998.

=== Films ===
Ramirez appeared as an extra in the HBO film Subway Stories (1997), where she met filmmaker Spike Lee who would later cast her in the film She Hate Me (2004). She played older sister Lauri in the film Fat Albert (2004). She was Callisto (one of The Omegas) in the comic book film X-Men: The Last Stand (2006). She went on to star in The 5th Commandment, a film written by and starring Rick Yune, in 2008. In 2012, Ramirez appeared in two films, playing Selena in American Reunion and a bicycle messenger in Premium Rush.

=== Television ===
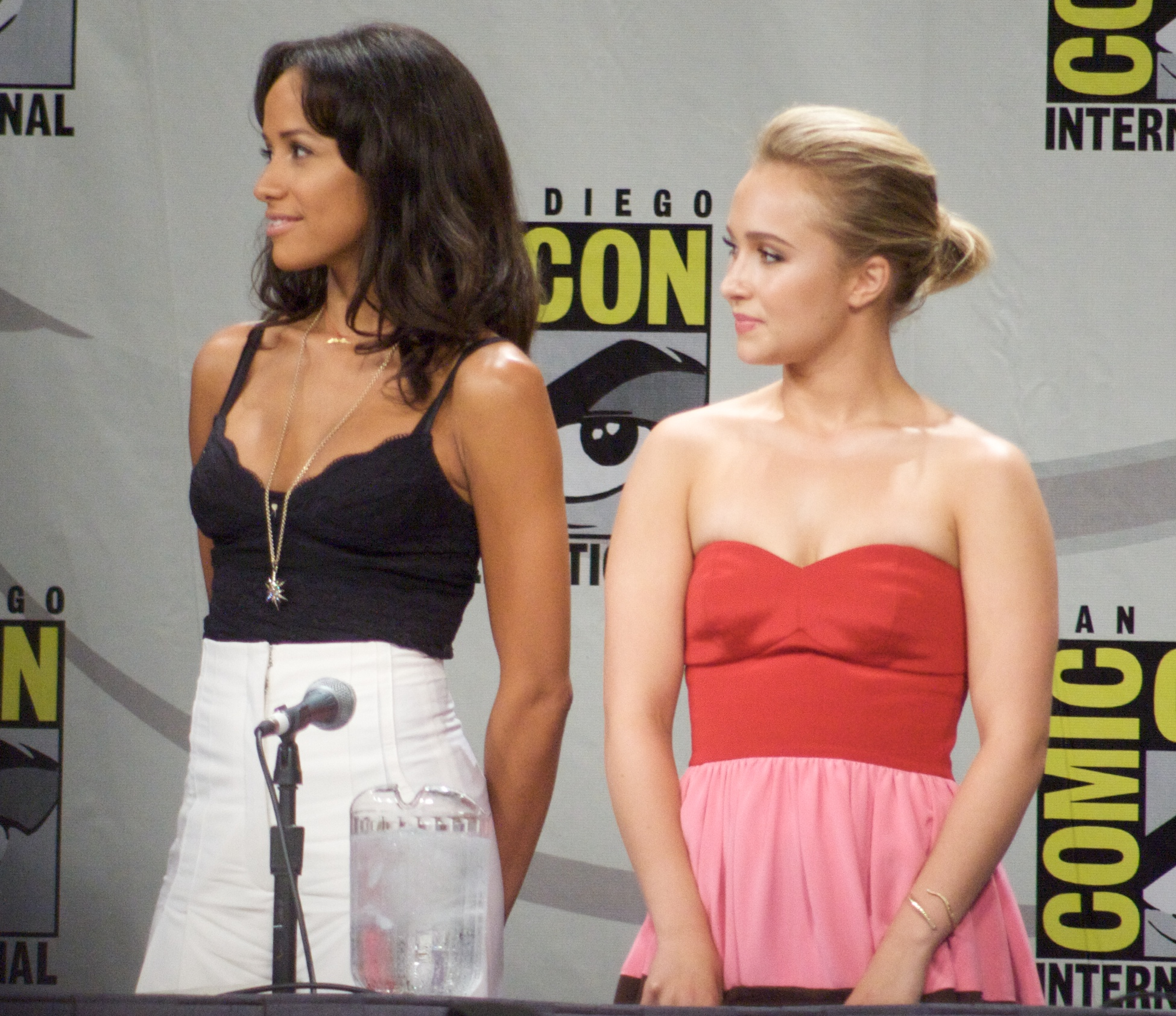
Ramirez and Heroes co-star Hayden Panettiere at Comic-Con, 2008.

Ramirez appeared as the minor character Caridad in the final episodes of the television series Buffy the Vampire Slayer, and as Blanca Selgado, a recurring role during season six of The Sopranos.

Ramirez portrayed the character of Maya Herrera on the TV series Heroes.

Ramirez was a guest judge on episode five of Cycle 14 of America's Next Top Model.

Ramirez guest starred as Alex, an employee of Turtle's, who begins a relationship with Turtle in season seven on the TV series Entourage. From 2013 to 2016, Ramirez portrayed protagonist Rosie Falta in the Lifetime series Devious Maids.

In July 2017, Ramirez was cast as a series regular in the softly-rebooted final season of Once Upon a Time. She portrayed Jacinda Vidrio, the real-world counterpart of the series' second iteration of Cinderella. In 2018, Ramirez was cast in another fairytale-themed drama, Tell Me a Story for CBS All Access. Ramirez played Hannah Perez, who is loosely based on Gretel from Hansel and Gretel.

As of 2023, Ramirez stars in Alert: Missing Persons Unit, which premieres on Fox on January 8. Her casting was announced in August 2022.

=== Other media ===
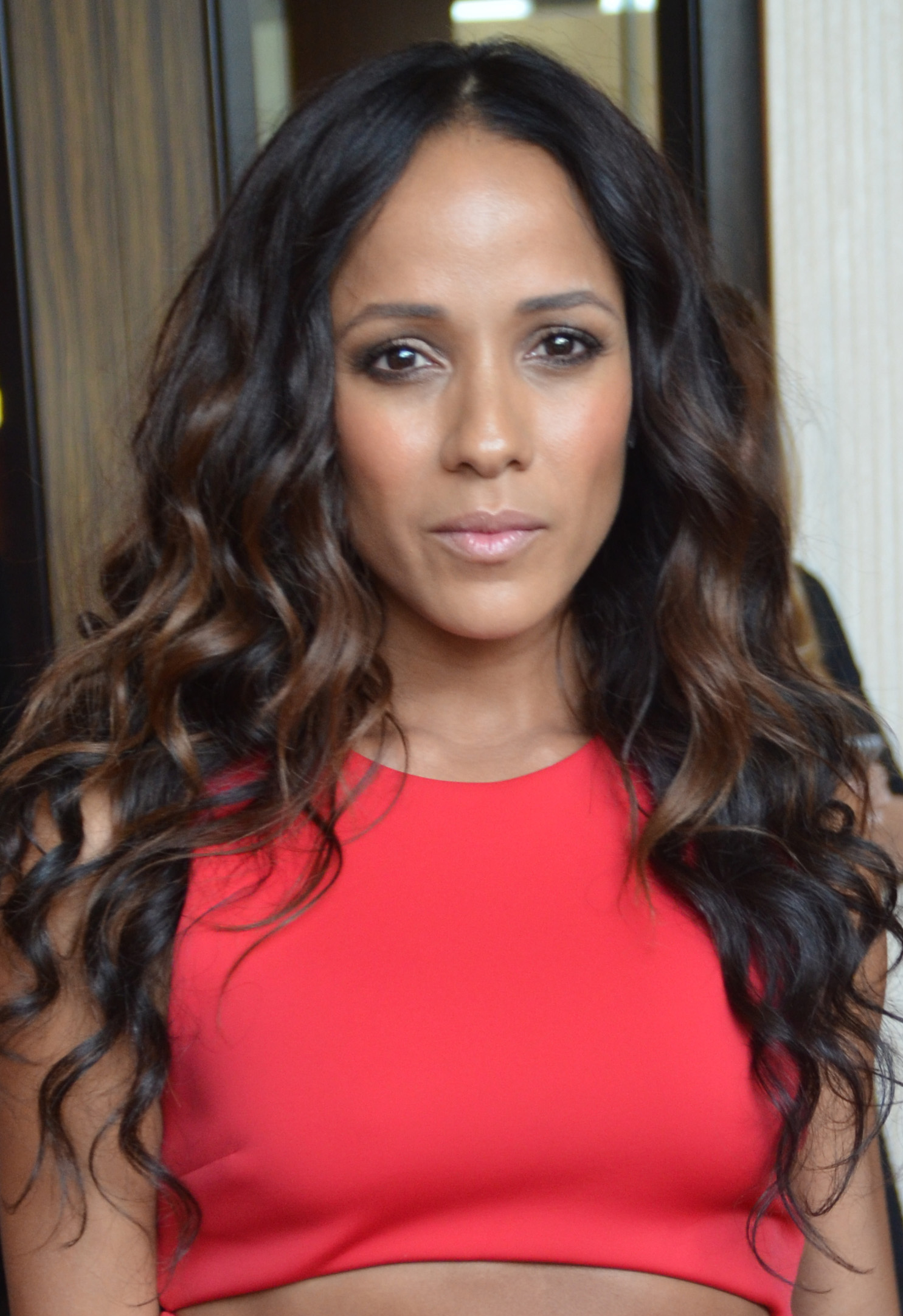
Ramirez at the 29th Annual Imagen Awards Gala at the Beverly Hilton in 2014

Ramirez has appeared in several magazine spreads. She has also been listed in several of the world's top publications' "Sexiest Ladies of the Year" lists. In 2009, she was added to the roster of models for CoverGirl Cosmetics. In January 2010, Ramirez and Queen Latifah launched the company's "Clean Makeup for Clean Water Campaign".

== Personal life ==
Ramirez dated Soul Plane director Jessy Terrero until 2008. In September 2011, she became engaged to director John Beverly "Bev" Land. The couple married on the beach in Punta Cana, Dominican Republic on February 16, 2013. Ramirez is the stepmother to Land's son from his previous marriage to Sharon Leal.

On July 15, 2013, Ramirez announced that she was pregnant with twins. That December, she gave birth to boy-girl twins.

== Filmography ==
=== Film ===
Year	Title	Role	Notes
2002	25th Hour	Daphne	
2004	Little Black Boot	Laurie Rodriguez	Short
2004	The Ecology of Love	Alila	Short
2004	Cross Bronx	Mia	
2004	She Hate Me	Alex Guerrero	
2004	Fat Albert	Lauri	
2005	Romy and Michele: In the Beginning	Elena	Television film
2006	X-Men: The Last Stand	Callisto	
2007	Illegal Tender	Ana	
2008	Ball Don't Lie	Carmen	
2008	The Fifth Commandment	Angel	
2008	Quarantine	Sadie	
2009	The Devil's Tomb	Shanae	Direct-to-Video
2010	Next Big Thing	The Girl	Short
2012	American Reunion	Selena	
2012	Premium Rush	Vanessa	
2013	N.Y.C. Underground	Jessica	Video
2015	Mojave	Detective Beaumont	
2015	First Response	Camilla	Television film
2017	Lycan	Isabella Cruz	
2018	Off the Menu	Javiera Torres	
2018	Suicide Squad: Hell to Pay	Scandal Savage (voice)	Direct-to-video
2019	Jumanji: The Next Level	NPC Seductress Flame	

=== Television ===
Year	Title	Role	Notes
2003	Buffy the Vampire Slayer	Caridad	Recurring cast (season 7)
2003	Run of the House	Lucy	Episode: "The Party"
2004	10-8: Officers on Duty	Inez	Episode: "Gypsy Road"
2005	Dr. Phil	Herself	Episode: "Dr. Phil & Dr. Bill"
2006–07	The Sopranos	Blanca Selgado	Recurring Cast: Season 6
2007–08	Heroes	Maya Herrera	Main cast (season 2–3)
2010	America's Next Top Model	Herself/Guest Judge	2 Episodes
2010	Entourage	Alex	Main cast (season 7)
2013–16	Devious Maids	Rosie Falta	Main cast
2017–18	Once Upon a Time	Cinderella/Jacinda Vidrio	Main cast (season 7)
2018	Justice League Action	Margot Montgomery / Red Velvet (voice)	Episode: "She Wore Red Velvet"
2018–19	Tell Me a Story	Hannah Perez	Main cast (season 1)
2021–24	Sweet Tooth	Aimee Eden	Main cast
2023–25	Alert: Missing Persons Unit	Nikki Batista	Main cast (season 1–2); Guest cast (season 3)

== Accolades ==
Year	Association	Category	Work	Result
2008	ALMA Awards	Outstanding Supporting Actress in a Drama Television Series	Heroes	Nominated
2014	Imagen Awards	Best Actress –Television	Devious Maids	Nominated
2015	Imagen Awards	Best Actress –Television	Devious Maids	Nominated
2016	NAMIC Vision Awards	Best Performance–Comedy	Devious Maids	Won

== See also ==
- List of Afro-Latinos
- List of people from the Dominican Republic
