= Rebecca Wisocky =

American actress (b. 1971)

- Wisocky in 2024
- Born: November 12, 1971 (age 54); York, Pennsylvania, U.S
- Education: New York University (BFA)
- Occupation: Actress
- Years active: 1995–present
- Spouse: Lap Chi Chu (m. 2015)

Rebecca Wisocky (born November 12, 1971) is an American actress. Best known for her roles as Hetty Woodstone on the CBS sitcom Ghosts and Evelyn Powell on Lifetime comedy-drama Devious Maids, she has also had guest star roles in many popular shows such as Desperate Housewives, Brooklyn Nine-Nine, American Horror Story, Once Upon a Time, Modern Family, and a recurring role as Ramdha on Star Trek: Picard.

== Early life and education ==
Wisocky was born in York, Pennsylvania. She began her acting career at York Little Theatre, a community theater in York where she said she spent most of her childhood. She also attended the Pennsylvania Governor's School for the Arts. Wisocky later moved to New York City, and graduated from the New York University Experimental Theatre Wing.

== Career ==
Wisocky began work in the theatre, appearing on Broadway in 1995 in The Play's the Thing. Wisocky later performed in many stage productions, primarily playing strong women, like Lady Macbeth and Medea. In 2008, she won the Obie Award for Distinguished Performance by an Actress for her role as Nazi-era German filmmaker Leni Riefenstahl in Jordan Harrison's Amazons and Their Men. She also acted in several other Off-Broadway plays, including Don Juan Comes Back from the War, The Tooth of Crime, and Hot 'N Throbbing.

Wisocky had supporting roles in number of films, including Pollock (2000), Funny Money (2006), and Atlas Shrugged: Part I (2011). She made her television debut in 2000, on an episode of HBO comedy Sex and the City. In later years, she also guest starred on Law & Order, Law & Order: Criminal Intent, Law & Order: Special Victims Unit, The Sopranos, NCIS, Bones, Emma Smith in Big Love, and as Queen Mab on True Blood. Wisocky had a recurring roles in the CW series 90210 from 2010 to 2011, CBS's The Mentalist (2010-2013) as Brenda Shettrick, and in the first season of FX series American Horror Story as Lorraine Harvey.

In early 2012, Marc Cherry cast Wisocky in his comedy-drama television pilot Devious Maids as Evelyn Powell, the main antagonist of the show. Previously, she played Bree's Mother on Desperate Housewives (episode "Women and Death"). The series was originally in development to air on ABC, but not picked. In June 2012, Lifetime picked up the pilot with a thirteen-episode order to air in early 2013. Wisocky received positive reviews from critics for her performance in the series. In 2014, Wisocky had guest-starring roles in the ABC dramas Castle and Once Upon a Time. In 2015, she appeared opposite Sally Field in the comedy-drama film, Hello, My Name Is Doris, directed by Michael Showalter. The following years, Wisocky appeared on The X-Files, The Sinner, Modern Family, 9-1-1, For All Mankind, and Star Trek: Picard. In 2021, she began starring as Hetty Woodstone, the deceased lady of the manor, on the CBS comedy series, Ghosts.

== Personal life ==
On January 5, 2015, Wisocky became engaged to Lap Chi Chu, a theatrical lighting designer, on the Pont de la Tournelle in Paris. They married in Boston on October 10, 2015.

== Filmography ==
=== Film ===
Year	Title	Role	Notes
1996	The Fountain of Death	Ashley	
2000	It Had to Be You	Waitress	
2000	Pollock	Dorothy Seiberling	
2005	Flightless Birds	DeAnn	Short film
2005	Escape Artists	Rachel	
2006	Funny Money	MM. Virginia	
2007	The Picture of Dorian Gray	Ursula Wooten	
2008	Henry May Long	Mary Sterling	
2009	My Two Fans	Patricia	
2011	Atlas Shrugged: Part I	Lillian Rearden	
2014	Swallow	Dr. Nagle	Short film
2015	Hello, My Name Is Doris	Anne Patterson	
2018	Ralph Breaks the Internet	eBay Elayne	Voice
2022	Blonde	Yvet	
2022	Amsterdam	Mrs. Moran	
2025	The Twits	Dee Dumdie-Dungle	Voice

=== Television ===
Year	Title	Role	Notes
2000	Sex and the City	Stephanie	Episode: "Frenemies"
2002, 2005	Law & Order: Criminal Intent	CSU Tech / Dede McCann	2 episodes: "Crazy" and "Diamond Dogs"
2003	Law & Order	Louise	Episode: "Star Crossed"
2003, 2006	Law & Order: Special Victims Unit	Marcy Cochran / Dr. Paula Greenfield	2 episodes: "Serendipity" and "Fault"
2004	Third Watch	Wanda	Episode: "Obsession"
2006	Untitled Patricia Heaton Project	Heike Gaert	TV movie
2006	The Sopranos	Rene Cabot Moskowitz	Episode: "Moe n' Joe"
2006	NCIS	Jody Carvell	Episode: "Dead and Unburied"
2006	Without a Trace	Cara Nelson	Episode: "The Thing with Feathers"
2007	Medium	Janice - Red Haired Woman	Episode: "Apocalypse, Push"
2007	Cold Case	Alice B. Harris - 1919	Episode: "Torn"
2007	Ugly Betty	Marsha Stein	Episode: "Grin and Bear It"
2009	Bones	Dr. Maura Bailey	Episode: "The Doctor in the Den"
2009	Samantha Who?	Lindsey	Episode: "The Amazing Racist"
2009	Saving Grace	Millie Holm	2 episodes: "Looks Like a Lesbian Attack to Me" and "Am I Gonna Die Today?"
2009	CSI: Crime Scene Investigation	Shirley	Episode: "Appendicitement"
2010	Ghosts/Aliens	Deb Hamburger	TV movie
2010	Miami Medical	Jennifer Seaver	Episode: "Like a Hurricane"
2010	Svetlana	Dr. Veronica	Episode: "Eco-Shlong"
2010–2011	90210	Principal Nowack	Recurring role, 4 episodes
2010–2013	The Mentalist	Brenda Shettrick	Recurring role, 9 episodes
2011	Big Love	Emma Smith	2 episodes: "The Oath" and "Where Men and Mountains Meet"
2011	Swallow	Dr. Nagle	TV movie
2011	True Blood	Queen Mab	Episode: "She's Not There"
2011	The Young and the Restless	Judge Click	3 episodes
2011	American Horror Story: Murder House	Lorraine Harvey	Recurring role, 3 episodes
2011	Circling the Drain	Elise Fama	TV movie
2012	In Plain Sight	Professor Lynn Gunter	Episode: "The Anti-Social Network"
2012	Desperate Housewives	Bree's Mother	Episode: "Women and Death"
2012	Longmire	Rachel Clausen	Episode: "The Dark Road"
2012	Criminal Minds	Sheriff Olivia Corwin	Episode: "The Good Earth"
2013	1600 Penn	Bianca	Episode: "Meet the Parent"
2013	Major Crimes	Madeline Morgan	Episode: "All In"
2013–2016	Devious Maids	Evelyn Powell	Series regular, 46 episodes
2014	Castle	Dr. Elena Sarkov	Episode: "Clear & Present Danger"
2014	Once Upon a Time	Madam Faustina	Episode: "Shattered Sight"
2015	The Exes	Victoria	2 episodes: "Holly Franklin Goes to Washington" and "A Bride Too Far"
2015	Grimm	Lily Hinkley	Episode: "Death Do Us Part"
2016	The X-Files	Jackie Goldman	Episode: "Founder's Mutation"
2016–2017	Graves	Dr. Sandra Schwartz	2 episodes: "A Tincture of Madness" and "Cradle to the Graves"
2017	Rebel	Elsa Folster	3 episodes
2017	The Sinner	Margaret Lacey	2 episodes: "Part II" and "Part III"
2017	NCIS: Los Angeles	Sasha Livingston	Episode: "Plain Sight"
2017	Modern Family	Mrs. Graham	Episode: "No Small Feet"
2018	9-1-1	Marjorie Daniels	Episode: "Trapped"
2018	Lethal Weapon	Commissioner Debra	Episode: "Family Ties"
2018	Heathers	Martha Chandler	Recurring role, 4 episodes
2018	NCIS: New Orleans	Bernadine Caldwell	Episode: "Sheepdogs"
2019	S.W.A.T.	Ruth Pearson	Episode: "Bad Faith"
2019	All Rise	Margot Baxter	Episode: "Devotees in the Courthouse of Love"
2019	The Purge	Deb Parker	Episode: "House of Mirrors"
2019	For All Mankind	Marge Slayton	Recurring role, 4 episodes
2020	Bull	AUSA Lambert	Episode: "Quid Pro Quo"
2020	The Resident	Dr. Judith Brown	Episode: "Doll E. Wood"
2020	Star Trek: Picard	Ramdha	Recurring role, 3 episodes
2020	Zoey's Extraordinary Playlist	Nancy Wellington	Episode: "Zoey's Extraordinary Confession"
2021	United States of Al	Lisa Patterson	Episode: "Fundraiser/Baspana Towlawal"
2021	Why Women Kill	Harriet	Episode: "They Made Me a Killer"
2021	Brooklyn Nine-Nine	Captain Lamazar	Episode: "The Good Ones"
2021	Dopesick	Cynthia McCormick	Mini-series, 3 episodes
2021–present	Ghosts	Hetty Woodstone	Series regular Nominated — Saturn Award for Best Supporting Actress on Television (2024); Nominated — Astra Television Award for Best Supporting Actress in Broadcast Network or Cable Comedy Series (2024); Nominated — Hollywood Critics Association TV Awards for Best Supporting Actress in a Broadcast Network or Cable Series, Comedy (2024); Nominated — Critics' Choice Television Award for Best Supporting Actress in a Comedy Series (2026)
2024–2025	The Sex Lives of College Girls	Professor Dorfmann	Recurring role, 4 episodes

=== Video games ===
- Dishonored: Death of the Outsider (2017) – Cultists
- Star Wars Squadrons (2020) – Kierah 'Gunny' Koovah
- Star Wars Jedi: Survivor (2023) – Doma Dendra

=== Theatre ===
- God's Ear as Lenora (Vineyard Theatre)
- Amazons and Their Men as Leni Riefenstahl (Clubbed Thumb)
- Hot'n'Throbbing as VO (Signature)
- Medea in Jerusalem as Medea (Rattlestick)
- Tatjana in Color as Wally (Culture Project)
- Antigone as Creon (Classic Stage Company)
- The Squirrel as Jessica (SPF)
- The Bitter Tears of Petra von Kant as Petra (Henry Miller Theatre)
- Sueno as Estrella (MCC)
- Middle Finger as Myrna (Ma-Yi)
- A Tale of Two Cities as Madame Defarge (Culture Project)
- Hot Keys as Calitha (P.S. 122)
- Tooth of Crime as Becky Lou (Second Stage/Signature)
- 36 Views as Elizabeth (NYSF/The Public)
