= Grant Show =

American actor (born 1962)

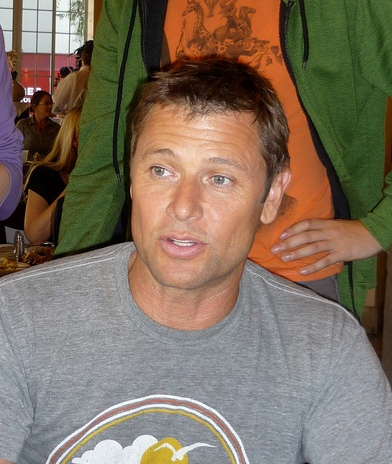
- Show in 2009
- Born: February 27, 1962 (age 64); Detroit, Michigan, U.S.
- Education: University of California, Los Angeles
- Occupation: Actor
- Years active: 1984–present
- Spouses: Pollyanna McIntosh (m. 2004; div. 2011); Katherine LaNasa (m. 2012)
- Children: 1

Grant Show (born February 27, 1962) is an American actor. Show is widely known for his role on Melrose Place as Jake Hanson, which he played from 1992 to 1997. From 2017 to 2022, he portrayed Blake Carrington in the soap opera reboot Dynasty.

== Early life ==
Born in Detroit, Michigan, Show is the son of Ed and Kathleen Show (née McMillion), and has a sister, Kelly, with whom he was raised in the Milpitas, California, area. He is a graduate of UCLA, where he was a member of the Alpha Tau Omega fraternity.

== Career ==
He broke into show business during college. His first major role was on the daytime soap opera Ryan's Hope, in which he played Rick Hyde from 1984–1987. During his last year on the show, he received a Daytime Emmy nomination for "Outstanding Young Actor in a Daytime Drama Series". Also, during his time on the soap, Show dated fellow Ryan's Hope actor Yasmine Bleeth. Hyped as the series' leading heartthrob, he even had a pin-up poster issued during the series' run but later became dissatisfied with acting in soaps and went to London in order to improve his craft. Returning to the United States in the late 1980s, he landed occasional primetime television acting jobs.

He auditioned for (but did not receive) the part of J.D in the 1991 film Thelma & Louise, which was a break-out role for Brad Pitt. The other two actors who missed out after auditioning with Geena Davis were Mark Ruffalo and George Clooney, whom she did not recognise until he reminded her of his disappointment at missing out on the role several years later, a tale she recounted on The Graham Norton Show.

His appearances on television attracted the attention of producer Aaron Spelling, who felt he had star potential and decided to cast him as Jake Hanson on a few episodes of the popular series Beverly Hills, 90210 in order to spin off the character as the lead in his next series Melrose Place. Debuting with much fanfare (Show was on the covers of both TV Guide and People immediately after the series' debut), the series' ratings in its first season were not up to expectations, and the show was revamped in the middle of the first season from an episodic strait-laced drama format to a melodramatic soap opera serial format in the tradition of Dynasty, one of Spelling's earlier hits. The series made Show one of the most popular and best-known actors on American television during the 1990s. He also played Jake in a guest appearance in the pilot of the Melrose spin-off Models Inc., making him the only actor to play the same character on the first three shows in the Beverly Hills, 90210 franchise.

During his time on Melrose Place, Show also appeared on an episode of Saturday Night Live hosted by Laura Leighton. In 1997, Show, Leighton (an off-screen girlfriend of Show's for a period), Doug Savant, Courtney Thorne-Smith and Marcia Cross left Melrose Place, which led the show into a major decline. It was cancelled two years later, though Show later regretted his decision to leave, despite his dislike of the scripts during his final season.

He has since starred in a number of television movies, including Blessed Assurance with Cicely Tyson, Between Love and Honor with Robert Loggia, and Homeland Security with Tom Skerritt and was one of the leads in the short-lived Fox Network supernatural drama Point Pleasant in 2005. He made a guest appearance in three episodes of HBO's acclaimed series Six Feet Under in 2002, and in 2006 he guest-starred on two episodes of the ABC Family show Beautiful People, alongside former Melrose Place co-star Daphne Zuniga.

In 2007, Show appeared in three episodes of the FX show Dirt, playing a closeted gay action movie hero, Jack Dawson. In 2008, Show starred in the short-lived CBS summer drama series Swingtown as an airline pilot, Tom Decker. Show was also featured in a recurring role in episodes of Private Practice in the 2008–2009 season. He starred opposite Jenna Elfman in the 2009 series Accidentally on Purpose, his first sitcom. In the 2010 and 2011 season, he appeared in the recurrent role of Michael Sainte, the Goji Guru, on the HBO series Big Love. He has acted in a number of stage productions. In 1990, he played the lead in an adaptation of On the Waterfront and after his stint on Melrose Place he appeared in a production of The Glass Menagerie. He was on Broadway in 1999 playing a doctor in Wit. In 2012, he appeared in the film The Possession, directed by Ole Bornedal, alongside Jeffrey Dean Morgan and Kyra Sedgwick. In 2013, he began his role as Spence Westmore on Devious Maids. In March 2017, he was cast in The CW's Dynasty reboot as Blake Carrington.

== Personal life ==
Grant Show married model and actress Pollyanna McIntosh in 2004. The couple met when they posed together for a Lane Bryant ad in 2003. They were divorced in 2011. In July 2012, Show became engaged to actress Katherine LaNasa. They married on August 18, 2012. They had a daughter in 2014.

== Filmography ==
=== Film ===
Year	Title	Role	Notes
1992	A Woman, Her Men, and Her Futon	Randy	
1992	Coopersmith	CD Coopersmith	
2004	Marmalade	Aiden	
2007	Raw Footage	Mitch Graham	Short film
2007	The Girl Next Door	Mr. Moran	
2009	All Ages Night	Jeff Markham	
2011	Action Figures	Bruce	
2011	Fxxxen Americans	John	Short film and also co-producer
2011	Born to Race	Jimmy Kendall	
2011	Coming Up for Air	Bill	Short film
2012	Mindfield	Murphy	Short film
2012	The Possession	Brett	
2014	Born to Race: Fast Track	Jimmy Kendall	

=== Television ===
Year	Title	Role	Notes
1984−1987	Ryan's Hope	Rick Hyde	Series regular; 5 episodes
1985	ABC Afterschool Special	Gregory Prince III	Episode: "Cindy Eller: A Modern Fairy Tale"
1986	The Love Boat	Christopher Stuart	2 episodes
1989	When We Were Young	Michael Stefanos	TV movie
1989−1990	True Blue	Cadet Casey Pierce	Series regular; 12 episodes
1990	Lucky Chances	Marco	Miniseries
1992	Treacherous Crossing	Chief Stevens	TV movie
1992	Beverly Hills, 90210	Jake Hanson	2 episodes
1992	Coopersmith	C.D. Coopersmith	TV movie
1992–1997	Melrose Place	Jake Hanson	Series regular; 158 episodes
1994	Burke's Law	Dash Thornton	Episode: "Who Killed the Starlet?"
1994	Models Inc.	Jake Hanson	Episode: "Pilot"
1994	Texas	William B. Travis	TV movie
1995	Between Love and Honor	Steve Allie Collura	TV movie
1995	Saturday Night Live	Jake Hanson	1 episode
1996	Hope and Gloria	Himself	1 episode
1996	Pretty Poison	Dennis Pitt	TV movie
1997	Mother Knows Best	Ted Rogers	TV movie
1997	The Price of Heaven	Jerry Shand	TV movie
1998	Ice	Robert Drake	TV movie
1999	Partners	Elliott Thompson	Episode: "A Beautiful Day"
1999	The Alchemists	Connor Malloy	TV movie
2000	Ed	Troy McCallum	Episode: "Your Life Is Now"
2001	UC: Undercover	John Keller	2 episodes
2002	Six Feet Under	Scott Axelrod	3 episodes
2002	Arli$$	Trevor Lawson	Episode: "Playing It Safe"
2003	Encrypt	Garth	TV movie
2003	Sex and the Single Mom	Alex Lofton	TV movie
2004	Strong Medicine	Ben Sanderson	5 episodes
2004	Mystery Girl	Christopher Sullivan	TV Short film
2004	Homeland Security	Bradley Brand	TV movie
2005−2006	Point Pleasant	Lucas Boyd	Series regular; 13 episodes
2005	More Sex and the Single Mom	Alex Lofton	TV movie
2005−2006	Beautiful People	Daniel Kerr	4 episodes
2007	Dirt	Jack Dawson	4 episodes
2008	Swingtown	Tom Decker	Series regular; 13 episodes
2008−2011	Private Practice	Dr. Archer Montgomery	7 episodes
2009	Grey's Anatomy	Dr. Archer Montgomery	Episode: "Before and After"
2009	Natalee Holloway	George "Jug" Twitty	TV movie
2009−2010	Accidentally on Purpose	James	Series regular; 16 episodes
2010	Scoundrels	Alan Markham	Episode: "Liar, Liar, Pants on Fire"
2011	Big Love	Goji Guru	5 episodes
2011	Justice for Natalee Holloway	George "Jug" Twitty	TV movie
2011	Burn Notice	Max	3 episodes
2011−2012	CSI: Crime Scene Investigation	Agent Viggo McQuaid	2 episodes
2013−2016	Devious Maids	Spence Westmore	Series regular; 44 episodes
2013	The Exes	Alex	Episode: "Zero Dark Forties"
2015	Criminal Minds	Colton Grant	Episode: "The Forever People"
2015	Satisfaction	Arthur Waverly	Recurring role; 7 episodes (Season 2)
2016	The Family	Governor Charlie Lang	10 episodes
2017–2022	Dynasty	Blake Carrington	Main role; director: "The British Are Coming" and "There's No One Around to Watch You Drown"
2019	Write Before Christmas	Tom	Television film
2026	All's Fair	Mr. Keller	Episode: "Going Down"

== Awards and nominations ==
Year	Award	Work	Result
1987	Daytime Emmy Award for Outstanding Younger Actor in a Drama Series	Ryan's Hope	Nominated
1986	Daytime Emmy Award for Outstanding Younger Leading Man in a Drama Series	Ryan's Hope	Nominated
