= Victor Salazar (character) =

Fictional character from Love, Victor

- Love, Victor character
- Michael Cimino as Victor Salazar
- First appearance: "Welcome to Creekwood" (episode 1.01)
- Last appearance: "Brave" (episode 3.08)
- Created by: Isaac Aptaker; Elizabeth Berger
- Portrayed by: Michael Cimino

In-universe information
- Full name: Victor Salazar
- Nicknames: Vick; Ferris Wheel Boy
- Gender: Male
- Occupation: High school student Barista
- Family: Armando Salazar (father); Isabel Salazar (mother); Pilar Salazar (sister); Adrian Salazar (brother); Nathalia Salazar (grandmother); Tito Salazar (grandfather)
- Significant others: Mia Brooks; Benji Campbell; Rahim; Nick
- Residence: Shady Creek, Atlanta, Georgia; Texas (formerly)

Victor Salazar is a fictional character and the protagonist of the Hulu teen comedy drama series Love, Victor portrayed by American actor Michael Cimino. He makes his first appearance in the series premiere "Welcome to Creekwood" (2020). In the series, which is a spin-off of the 2018 film Love, Simon and follows similar themes, Victor is a sixteen year old half-Puerto Rican, half-Colombian-American teenager originally from Texas who moves to the town of Shady Creek with his family and begins a journey of self-discovery, navigating family and friendship dynamics and struggling with his sexual orientation.

The character of Victor has been well received by critics, who praised the rare depiction of an LGBT Latino teen main character and the series' exploration of sexuality in that culture, as well as Victor's struggles with his masculinity, religion, and family. Cimino's performance has also received a positive reception, and he has been nominated for and won several awards for his authenticity and likeability in the role.

== Casting and characterization ==
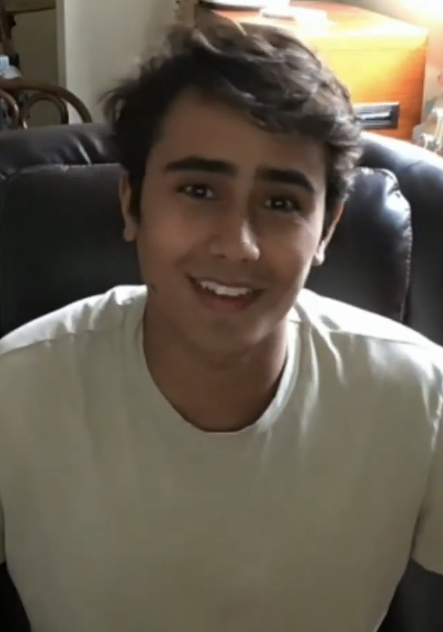
Michael Cimino portrays Victor

The character of Victor was created by showrunners Isaac Aptaker and Elizabeth Berger, who also wrote the script of Love, Simon. They aimed to use Victor to address some of the criticisms levelled at Simon, namely his whiteness, privilege, and the ease of his coming out by making Victor a Latinx teen from a working class background with deeply religious parents. One of the show's writers, Brian Tanen, stated that this was the first thing that Aptaker and Berger pitched to him about the series, and how they wanted Victor to reach out to Simon in order to depict how every coming out journey is different.

Cimino's casting as Victor was announced on August 21, 2019 as is his first leading role in a television series. Discussing the character, Cimino stated, "Victor is a fun loving guy. He's outgoing, but also reserved. The whole story is about Victor and his journey of self-discovery." He described the role as "very special" and stated that he spoke with his gay cousin in order to make sure his portrayal of Victor's struggle with his sexuality was realistic and authentic, explaining that, "I wanted Victor to feel like a real human being. I feel like the most important thing about this whole story is that someone could relate to Victor and relate to his story, no matter what your sexual orientation is, no matter what ethnicity you are. And I feel like adding elements of myself and of my cousin, did that." He further expressed that "Victor's struggle is unique because everyone's story is very unique and different", but that he hoped the character would encourage people to have conversations within their families and friendship groups around sexuality and make it easier for people to come out in the future.

Similarly, Cimino, who is of mixed Puerto Rican and Italian heritage, felt that Victor's mixed heritage was also important to depict on-screen, citing that his own growing up in-between cultures gave him a "deeper understanding" of his character. Of the intersection between Latin culture and sexuality, Cimino stated, "there is definitely more pressure on people who are LGBTQ+ in the Latinx community, where there’s this stereotype of being machismo and strong and masculine. In reality, there is no right way to be masculine, there is no right or wrong way to be gay and there is no right or wrong way to be a human being", and he expressed his hope that Victor's character would break barriers in those communities.

== Fictional character biography ==
=== Season one ===
Victor was born and raised in Texas as the eldest child of Armando (James Martinez) and Isabel Salazar (Ana Ortiz). He and his family, which also includes his younger siblings Pilar (Isabella Ferreira) and Adrian (Mateo Fernandez) move to the town of Shady Creek in Atlanta when Armando gets a new job. While Pilar is resentful of the move, Victor is excited to have a chance to redefine himself and discover who he is in a more progressive place, having already begun questioning his sexuality. On arrival, he meets Felix (Anthony Turpel), an eccentric but unpopular boy who lives in the same building, and becomes friends with him. Victor begins attending Creekwood High, where he quickly develops a crush on openly gay student Benji (George Sear), and also makes a connection with popular student Mia Brooks (Rachel Hilson), and joins the basketball team, where he clashes with teammate Andrew (Mason Gooding), who ridicules him for being less affluent than the other students. Victor learns about the coming out story of former Creekwood student Simon Spier (Nick Robinson), and begins messaging him on social media for advice. At the Winter Carnival, Victor decides that he wants to fit in with his peers and asks Mia to ride the ferris wheel with him. Victor and Mia begin to become closer, and he confesses to Simon that he might like her, but also starts to bond with Benji when he begins working with him at Brasstown, the local coffee shop, in order to pay the membership fee for the basketball team. He later takes Mia on a date to an art exhibition where the two share their first kiss, but continues to struggle with his attraction to Benji. Pilar reveals to Victor that Isabel had an affair, which Victor, who has a very close relationship with his mother, initially refuses to believe until Pilar sets up a meeting with Roger posing as Isabel, and Victor recognises him as Armado's former boss. The shock causes Victor to storm off during a basketball game and he confronts his parents about Isabel's affair, leaning that his father was already aware and that it was the reason they had to leave Texas. Following the revelations, Victor begins acting as the family's "fixer" and tries to resolve any conflict, which places additional pressure onto him as he prepares for his sixteenth birthday. His paternal grandparents visit for the party, and Victor becomes uncomfortable when Benji brings his boyfriend Derek (Lukas Gage), fearing their reactions. When his grandfather makes homophobic comments, Victor stands up for Benji and Derek, and further cements his relationship with Mia by introducing her to his parents.

As their relationship continues to develop, Mia wants to take things to the next level with Victor, who is a virgin. Victor ruins her plan for a romantic evening by inviting Felix along, causing Mia's best friend Lake (Bebe Wood) to chastise him. When he is unable to go through with sleeping with her, Victor tells Mia that he's simply not ready but denies anything else going on. He confesses to Simon that he likes her, but Simon suggests that he is not attracted to Mia and needs to work out what he wants before someone gets hurt. Wanting to force himself to be "normal", Victor continues his relationship with Mia, but misses an event hosted by her dad when he lies to Benji on a road trip to fix the Brasstown coffee machine that the repairs will take longer than planned, forcing them to spend the night together in a motel. There, Benji shares his coming out story with Victor and confides his past struggles with alcoholism. Victor kisses Benji, who pulls away, causing Victor to panic and tell Simon that he doesn't want his life to be so difficult. He then impulsively buys a bus ticket to New York to meet Simon.

== Development ==
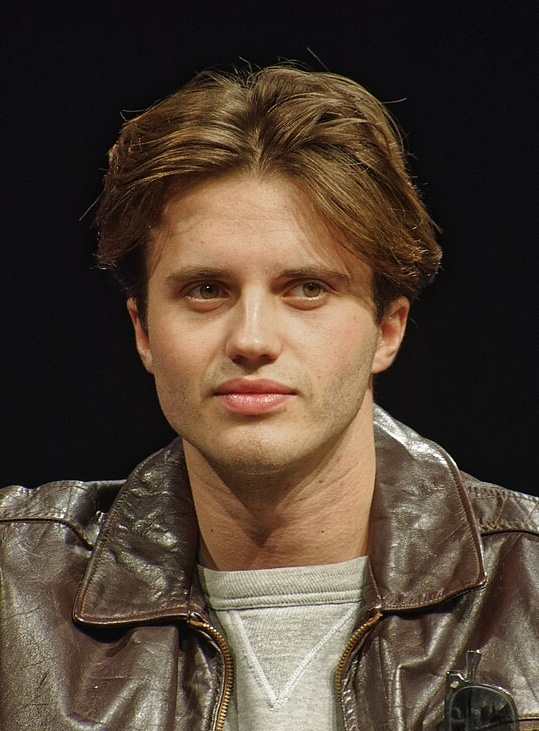
George Sear portrays Benji, Victor's main love interest

Discussing the differences between Victor and Simon, the character played by Nick Robinson in the 2018 film Love, Simon of which Love, Victor is a spinoff, Cimino stated, "I feel like the biggest differences between Simon and Victor are their social class and their ethnicity, and that Victor doesn’t’ know who he is. He’s trying to navigate his world. Simon knows his sexuality; he just hasn’t come out yet. Victor comes from a dysfunctional home. He struggles to hold things together that are far out of his control. He is being someone he is not. Victor being himself is a vitally important part of the story". Cimino also found Victor's need to be a "fixer" relatable and noted that it was "was easy for me to replicate and do it authentically".

Speaking about Felix's friendship with Victor, Anthony Turpel explained that he "took the opportunity" to befriend Victor because he was new to the town and Felix had no other friends. He later described Felix as "he perfect friend" and felt that despite being the one to introduce Victor to Benji, he had no idea about Victor's struggles with his sexuality, stating, "I don't even think it crossed Felix's mind, because he doesn't care. I think that's one of the greatest things about Felix. Victor will love whoever he loves and Felix is going to accept that." Turpel expressed that he was "super happy" that Felix was the first one who Victor confesses his feelings for Benji to, and felt that Felix's decision to immediately hug Victor "that explains [their] relationship so well."

Regarding Victor's relationship with Mia, Rachel Hilson stated, "Mia definitely gets caught in the middle of Victor’s uncertainty. A lot of people have been on both ends, but they have a really wonderful relationship at the core of it. They really connect as humans, honestly, and I think it was really good and important for the show to explore the fact that you can connect on an emotional level and things can get a little tricky from there.". Hilson felt that it was important and interesting to depict their fractured relationship following their breakup and Victor's coming out, explaining that, "it's really cool to explore this idea of being really happy for Victor and really excited about his journey of being true to himself, and then also feeling like she was collateral and feeling a little hurt by the way their relationship ended. So, it's cool to explore that two-fold experience because it's very real".

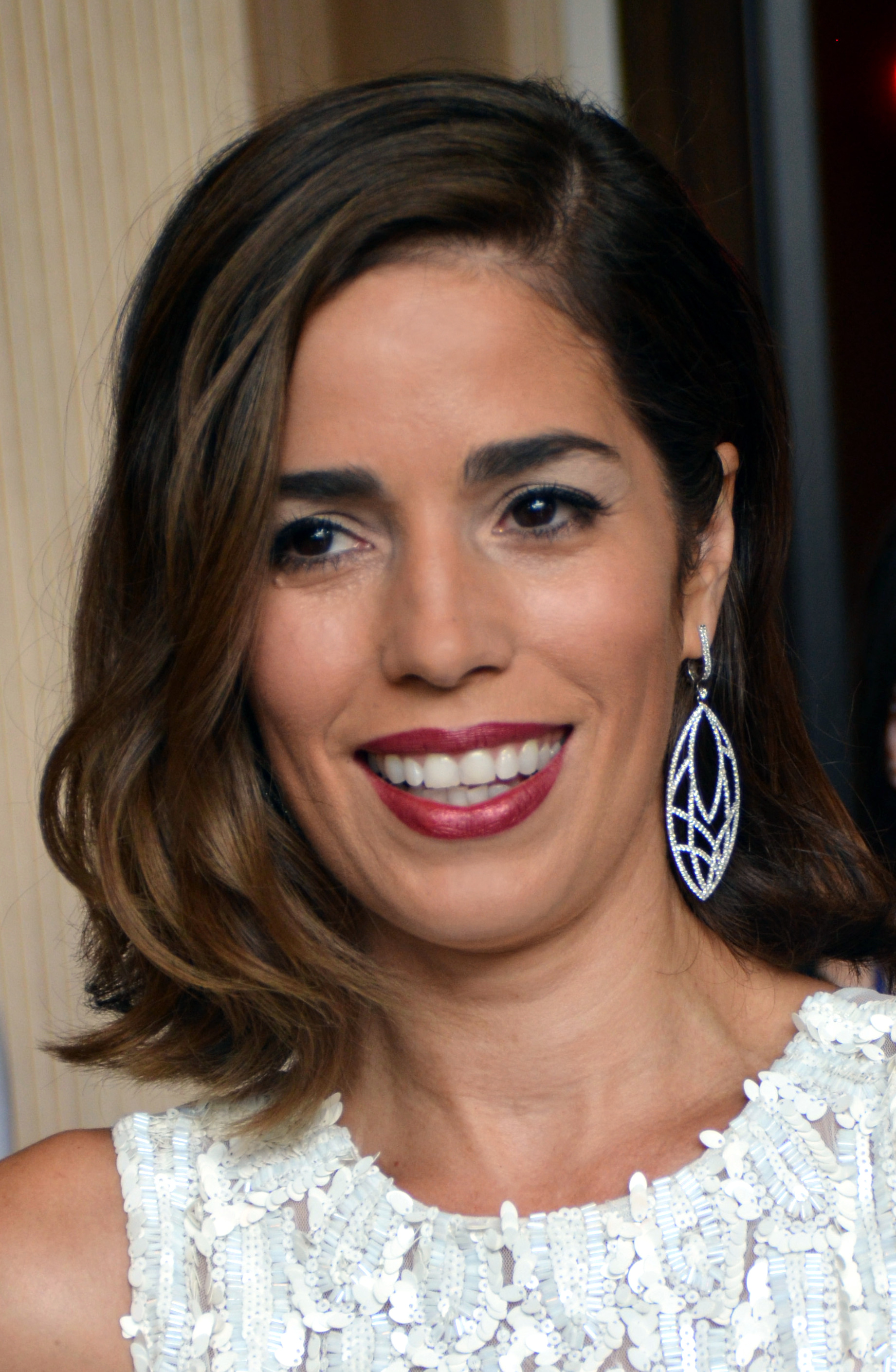
Ana Ortiz portrays Isabel, Victor's mother

Following Victor's coming out, his relationship with his mother Isabel becomes strained as she struggles to accept his sexuality. Cimino stated that he and Ana Ortiz "worked really hard on making [their dynamic] feel as accurate as possible" and that they both hoped that watching their journey throughout the series would show both parents and children that acceptance can be a process. He explained, "I think that a lot of parents what they do a lot of, especially brown people, a lot of brown parents struggle because it's like, 'I love my kids, but I also love my religion.' And I think that it kind of talks about what it's like to kind of go through that process and understanding that they need to accept their children regardless of their religion." He also expressed that the show offers the perspective that there is "light at the end of the tunnel" for families who are navigating a child's sexual orientation. Ortiz stated that she found the scenes "a real challenge" due to her previous portrayal of a supportive mother on Ugly Betty, and explained that Isabel "clearly loves her kids" and "would do anything for them", despite her struggle to reconcile her faith and culture with her son's sexuality. She also enjoyed the show depicting an unsupportive mother, noting that, "usually, especially in a Latinx family, the intolerance is going to come from the dad. It’s always going to be the disappointing father who doesn’t think that homosexuality is OK. That’s very true in our culture; the Latinx culture is very ‘machismo’ and it’s still taboo to be different. So, I think it’s really cool that they made it the mom: she loves her son more than anything on the planet, but she has this complex that she thinks he’s going to go to hell and that he’s a sinner."

Regarding the development of Victor and Benji's relationship, Cimino and George Sear both enjoyed being able to portray them exploring their sexual sides during the show's second season, with Cimino noting that, "I hope it reads that it's authentic and really explorative. And I feel like that is definitely the direction that George and I are trying to head in with it. But it's still so, so, so exciting for both of us. And yeah, it was really cool. I think it's cool to depict the LGBT community in an accurate way. Especially in a way where it's like teenagers can watch this and be like, 'Oh okay. Yeah, this is normal to feel this way.'" Sear similarly expressed that, for teenagers, sex "almost is like the center of your thoughts" and how he felt it was important that this was depicted in a gay couple.

== Reception ==
The character of Victor has received a positive reception from critics. IndieWire placed Victor at number four on their list of the best LGBTQ characters in film and television in 2020, with Jude Dry writing, "the refreshing magic is thanks to Victor Salazar, played by adorable newcomer Michael Cimino, whose earnest nature and puppy dog eyes could melt even the most jaded queer heart. It’s easy to root for Victor as he attempts to navigate familial duty with self-actualization, and Cimino is so warm and charismatic that he oozes teen TV dreamboat. How lucky for all the LGBTQ youth that get to grow up watching him". Radio Times also included him on their list of inspiring LGBTQ characters, with Lewis Knight writing, "Victor is the type of character that viewers want to see happy" and speaking positively about his development across all three seasons and the realism of the challenges he experiences while coming out. The character has also been cited as inspiring viewers to accept their own sexuality.

Writing for Nerds & Beyond Julia stated, "Victor’s story is one that brings validation, especially as a character who is questioning and trying to figure out who he likes", and praised the importance of the intersectionality of Victor's sexuality and culture being depicted in the show, explaining, "Victor also brings in specific cultural factors, as he’s also Latinx, providing a more complex and necessary viewpoint." She concluded by stating, "Victor Salazar is an important character, and he will continue to bring comfort and hope to those who need it the most."

Writing for The Tiger following the show's second season, Michael Mayemura wrote, "Victor Salazar, the show’s protagonist, is a brilliantly crafted character that is not only realistic but relatable. Throughout the show, Victor struggles with his identity, whether it be discovering his sexuality or understanding how the world perceives him, straining a few relationships along the way. Unlike other shows, Victor’s struggles within the gay community break down stereotypes, including his own, about what it means to be gay." Mayemura also praised the show's use of the character to explore his struggles beyond his sexuality, including his family dynamics, desire to fit in with his peers, devoutly religious upbringing, and relationship with Benji, stating that, " Victor’s strength comes in how he’s able to tackle these problems and his growing fearlessness in face of adversity". In a review of the second season, Shawn Laib of Den of Geek called Victor a "canvas for a myriad of interests and personalities, demonstrating the diversity of the Western LGBTQ+ experience", citing the show's exploration of his struggle to acclimatise as a more masculine-presenting gay man, he intersectionality of his culture and faith, and the contrasting acceptance of his parents, and praised the depiction of Victor's continued close friendship with Fleix following his coming out, as well as the relationship with his ex-girlfriend Mia, and dynamic with both Benji and Rahim. He concluded his review by writing, "Victor says in the second episode of season 2 that he hopes to inspire someone else to be themselves one day; he’s surely already done that tenfold".

Sofía Aguilar of Latina Media felt that Victor's character was a realistic exploration of the intricacies of LGBTQIA+ latinx representation.

=== Portrayal ===
Cimino's performance also received praise from critics. He was nominated for the Best Comedy Actor Award at the 2021 Gold Derby Television Awards, and won two consecutive Imagen Awards for Best Actor – Comedy (Television) in 2021 and 2022. He was also nominated for an Imagen Award for the final season, this time in the Best Actor – Drama (Television) category.

Mayemura stated of Cimino, "as the show progresses, Cimino grows more confident and comfortable portraying Victor. Cimino’s growth is best seen in how Victor matures throughout the show; Cimino’s growing tenacity is perfectly displayed in Victor’s newfound boldness. Cimino’s acting brilliance can also be seen in his portrayal of an LGBTQ+ character, without being LGBTQ+ himself. He respectfully plays a gay character and his conviction brings Victor’s problems to life. Overall, Cimino gives Victor depth as a character, flawlessly illustrating the naïve, caring, and empowering teen". Julia from Nerds and Beyond echoed this, writing that, "Michael Cimino does an excellent job bringing Victor to life and creating a relatable character. He clearly displays Victor’s swirl of emotions about his sexuality. He’s charming, funny, and sweet, making it incredibly easy to fall for Victor".
