= Jonah Mutono =

- Born: Jonah Mutono; London, United Kingdom
- Genres: R & B; electronic
- Occupations: Record producer; songwriter; musician
- Years active: 2016–present

Jonah Mutono, also known as Kidepo (born 3 September 1990), is a British-Ugandan singer-songwriter and producer born in London, England.

In June 2020, he was named as one of the ‘Best New Artists of 2020’ by NPR.

Mutono released Reunion EP as Kidepo in 2016. He released his debut album GERG in 2020.

Mutono's song ‘1949 Love’ was featured on season 7 of CW's The Flash where actor Jordan Fisher performed a cover during a wedding scene in episode 18.

Mutono covered the 1982 Yazoo hit "Only You" for the Love, Victor season three soundtrack, which was released on June 15, 2022.

== Discography ==
=== Studio albums ===
Title	Details
GERG	Released 6 May 2020; Label: True Panther Sounds, EQT Recordings; Format: Vinyl, LP, digital download, streaming
