= Ana Ortiz =

American actress and singer (born 1971)

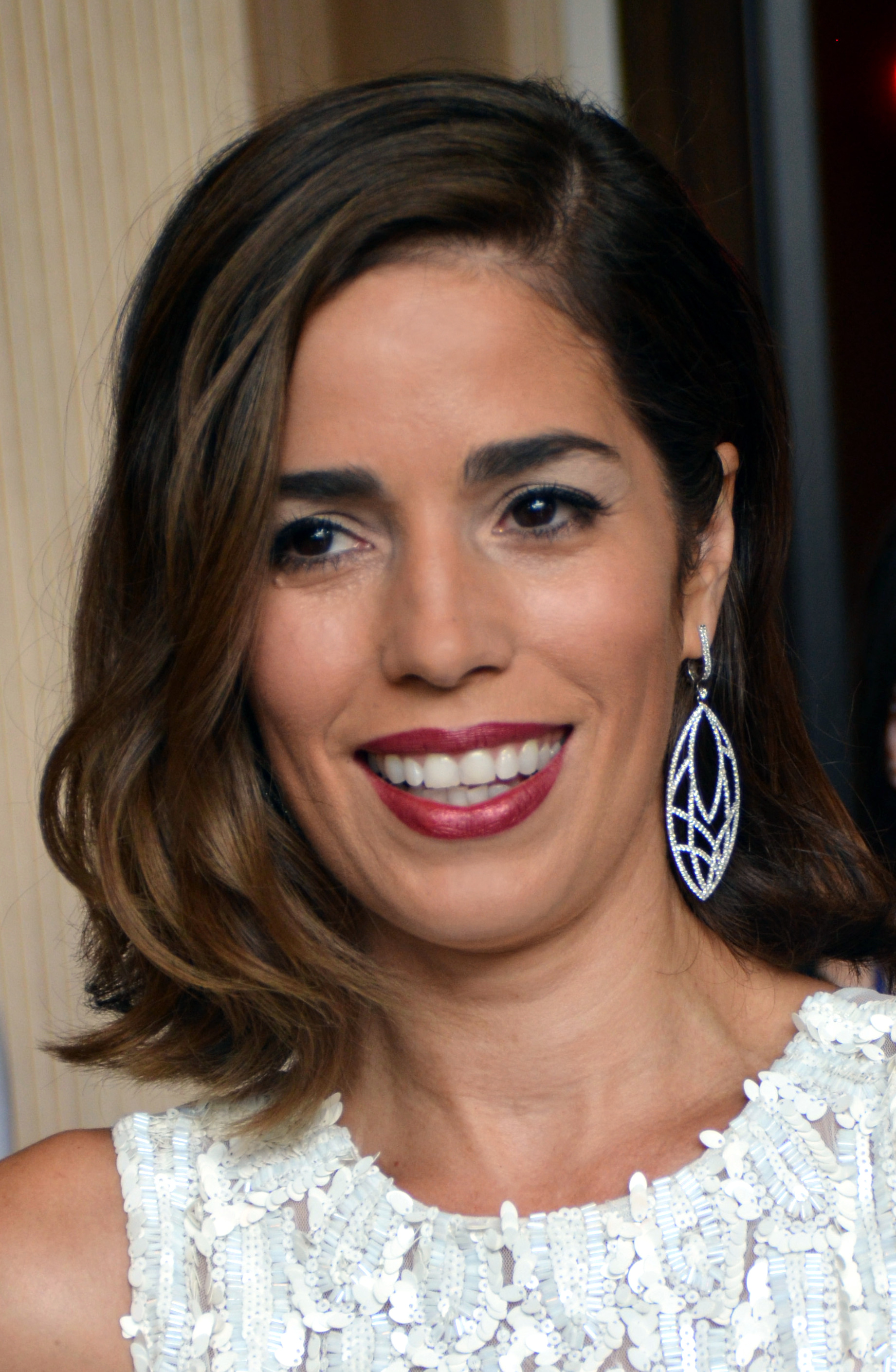
- Ortiz in 2014
- Born: January 25, 1971 (age 55); New York City, U.S.
- Other name: Ana Lebenzon
- Occupations: Actress, singer
- Years active: 1995–present
- Spouse: Noah Lebenzon (m. 2007)
- Children: 2

Ana Ortiz (born January 25, 1971) is an American actress. In the early 2000s, she starred in the short-lived NBC sitcoms Kristin (2001) and A.U.S.A. (2003), and had recurring roles on the action series Over There (2005) and the legal series Boston Legal (2006). She garnered widespread attention for her role as Hilda Suarez in the ABC comedy-drama series Ugly Betty (2006–2010).

Ortiz appeared in the comedy films Labor Pains (2009) and Big Mommas: Like Father, Like Son (2011). From 2013 to 2016, she starred as Marisol Suarez in the Lifetime television comedy-drama series Devious Maids, for which she received the Imagen Award for Best Actress - Television. From 2020 to 2022, Ortiz starred in the Hulu teen comedy series Love, Victor as Isabel Salazar, mother of the title character Victor.

== Life and career ==
=== Early life and career in theatre ===
Ortiz was born in New York City, and is the daughter of Angel Ortiz, a former Philadelphia City Council member of Puerto Rican descent, and Kathleen Kuhlman, who is of German and Irish descent. As a child, Ortiz studied ballet for eight years, until the pain of dancing en pointe forced her to pursue a different artistic discipline. Ortiz graduated from University of the Arts in Philadelphia.

Switching to singing, Ortiz attended the Fiorello H. LaGuardia High School of Music & Art and Performing Arts in New York City and later the University of the Arts in Philadelphia before making her professional stage debut in a regional theater production of Dangerous Liaisons. Her additional stage credits include portraying Chrissy in a European touring production of Hair, regional theater productions such as Dog Lady and the Cuban Swimmer and in the South Coast Repertory Theater's production of References to Salvador Dalí Make Me Hot. After joining LAByrinth Theatre Company, she appeared Off-Broadway in In Arabia We'd All Be Kings, directed by Academy Award-winning actor Philip Seymour Hoffman and named one of the 10-best plays of 1999 by the magazine Time Out New York.

Ortiz appeared in several television shows including NYPD Blue, Everybody Loves Raymond, Commander In Chief, ER, and The New Adventures of Old Christine. She had her first series regular role in short-lived NBC comedy series Kristin (2001). She later starred in another short-lived sitcom, called A.U.S.A. in 2003, and later had recurring roles in the FX drama Over There, and ABC series Boston Legal.

=== 2006–2010: Ugly Betty and other roles ===
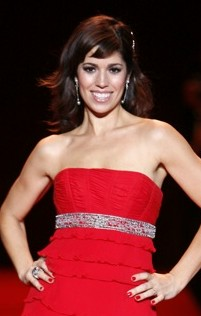
Ortiz at The Heart Truth Fashion Show 2008

In 2006, Ortiz was cast as Hilda Suarez, the lead character's sister, in the ABC comedy-drama series Ugly Betty. Originally, Ortiz had auditioned for the Betty Suarez role, saying in 2008, "I was super plain. I just put on some glasses and kept my hair kind of flat and layered on the clothing", describing what she wore when auditioning for the role of Betty. "I just wanted them to remember me, so that I could be involved in the future".

In addition to her role on Ugly Betty, Ortiz was active in films, which include starring roles in Tortilla Heaven and Labor Pains. She also had a voice role in Batman: Gotham Knight, and starred in the made-for-television movie Little Girl Lost: The Delimar Vera Story in 2008. Ortiz also had a guest-starring role on Army Wives during its second season, playing a waitress named Sandi. She also appeared in the 2010 music video for Enrique Iglesias and Juan Luis Guerra's "Cuando me enamoro".

=== 2010–present: Devious Maids and later ===
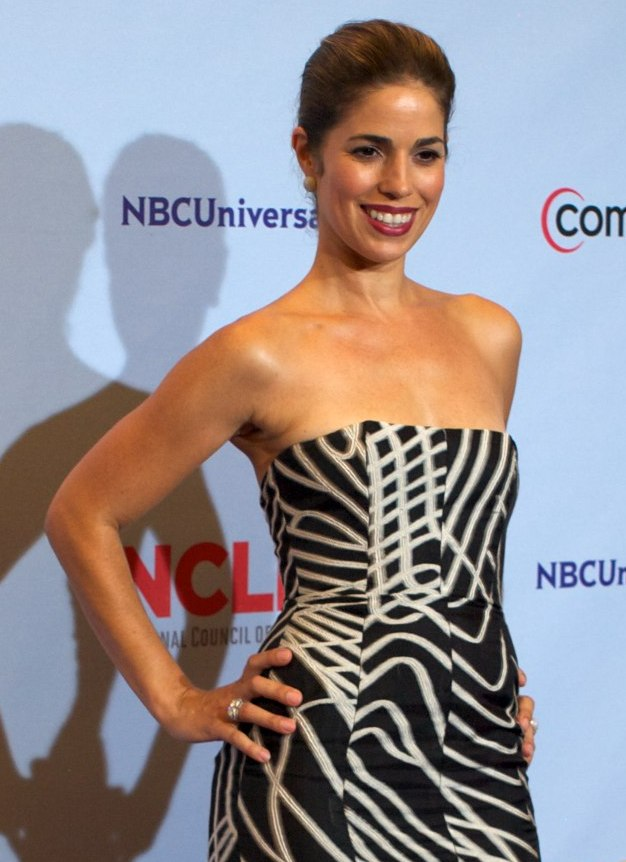
Ortiz at the Alma Awards 2012.

After Ugly Betty ended in 2010, Ortiz was cast as the lead character in the ABC drama pilot True Blue about San Francisco homicide detectives reunited to solve the murder of one of their own. The pilot was not picked up to series. The following year she appeared in the comedy film Big Mommas: Like Father, Like Son, and starred in another pilot, called Outnumbered for Fox, her second pilot not picked up to series. She later had a recurring role on the HBO comedy series Hung. Ortiz also starred in the independent films Sleeping with the Fishes, and Such Good People.

In 2012, Ortiz was cast as a lead character on the ABC comedy drama pilot Devious Maids. While ABC chose not to pick it up to series, Lifetime picked up the pilot with a thirteen-episode order. The series premiered June 23, 2013, on Lifetime with positive reviews from critics. In the show, she plays the lead role of Marisol Duarte (the alias of Professor Marisol Suarez). Also in 2013, Ortiz was special guest star in the ABC primetime soap opera, Revenge, as Bizzy Preston. In 2014, Ortiz guest-starred in episodes of two ABC shows: How to Get Away with Murder and Black-ish.

In 2014 Ortiz was cast in the gay-drama film Love is All You Need? (2016), based on the 2011 short film with the same name.

Devious Maids was canceled after four seasons, in 2016. The following year, Ortiz starred in her third unsold pilot, a comedy called Charlie Foxtrot. She did voice over work in the 2018 film Ralph Breaks the Internet.

In 2019, Ortiz appeared in the main cast of the comedy drama Whiskey Cavalier, playing FBI profiler Susan Sampson.

In 2020, Ortiz starred in the acclaimed Hulu series Love, Victor as Isabel Salazar, mother of the title character Victor Salazar. Her role is acclaimed by critics.

== Personal life ==
Ortiz married musician Noah Lebenzon on June 7, 2007, in Rincón, Puerto Rico. Their daughter Paloma was born June 25, 2009. Their second child, son Rafael, was born on September 24, 2011.

Ortiz is active in raising awareness against domestic abuse, citing her own experiences when she was in her 20s and involved in a romantic relationship that turned physically abusive. In an article for USA Today, Ortiz notes that the final scene from the Ugly Betty episode "How Betty Got Her Grieve Back", in which Hilda sat on her bed staring at the bathroom after realizing that Santos had died, was drawn from that experience: "I used some of that subconsciously ... It's something that is always with me".

== Filmography ==
=== Film ===
Year	Title	Role	Notes
1995	Condition Red	C Block Inmate	
2000	King of the Korner	Isabel	
2002	Mr. St. Nick	Lorena	
2002	Lehi's Wife	Kelly	Short film
2003	Carolina	Christen	
2007	Tortilla Heaven	Chicana	
2008	The Winged Man	Wanda	Short film
2008	Batman: Gotham Knight	Anna Ramirez (voice)	
2009	Labor Pains	Donna	
2011	Big Mommas: Like Father, Like Son	Gail Fletcher	
2011	The Last Generation	Diner Chick	Short film
2012	Noah's Ark: The New Beginning	Tier (voice)	
2013	Sleeping with the Fishes	Kayla Fish	
2014	Such Good People	Detective Diane Kershman	
2016	Love is All You Need?	Susan Miller	
2017	The Keeping Hours	Janice	
2017	Trust Fund	Meredith	
2018	Ralph Breaks the Internet	Ballet Mom (voice)	
2019	Princess of the Row	Magdalene Rodriguez	

=== Television ===
Year	Title	Role	Notes
1999	Dr. Quinn Medicine Woman: The Movie	Pregnant Woman	Television film
2000	NYPD Blue	Maria Alvarez	Episode: "A Hole in Juan"
2001	Kristin	Santa Clemente	Series regular, 13 episodes
2001	Everybody Loves Raymond	Natasha	Episode: "Raybert"
2002	NYPD Blue	Luisa Lopez	Episode: "Dead Meat in New Deli"
2002	Strong Medicine	Elena Delgado	Episode: "Family History"
2002	Do Over	Mrs. Rice	Episode: "Rock 'n' Roll Parking Lot"
2002	ER	Laura	Episode: "Hindsight"
2003	A.U.S.A.	Ana Rivera	Series regular, 13 episodes
2003	Greetings from Tucson	Angela	Episode: "Eegee's vs. Hardee's"
2003	Life on Parole	Loretta	TV pilot
2004	North Shore	Ana Green	Episode: "Secret Service"
2004	Foster Hall		TV pilot
2005	Blind Justice	Letitia Barreras	Episode: "Past Imperfect"
2005	Freddie	Gina	Episode: "Rich Man, Poor Girl"
2005	Over There	Anna	Recurring role, 7 episodes
2006	Commander in Chief	Isabelle Rios	Episode: "Wind Beneath My Wing"
2006	Boston Legal	A.D.A. Holly Raines	4 episodes
2006	The New Adventures of Old Christine	Belinda	Episode: "Some of My Best Friends Are Portuguese"
2008	Army Wives	Sandy	Episode: "Loyalties"
2008	Little Girl Lost: The Delimar Vera Story	Valerie Valleja	Television film
2006–10	Ugly Betty	Hilda Suarez	Series regular, 84 episodes
2010	True Blue	Maureen Minillo	TV pilot
2011	Outnumbered	Sue Tulley	TV pilot
2011	Hung	Lydia	Recurring role, 5 episodes
2013–16	Devious Maids	Marisol Suarez	Lead role, 49 episodes
2013	Revenge	Bizzy Preston	Episode: "Resurgence"
2014	How to Get Away with Murder	Paula Murphy / Elena Aguilar	Episode: "Smile, or Go to Jail"
2014–17	Family Guy	Cinnamon, Maid (voices)	2 episodes
2015	Black-ish	Angelica Rodriguez	Episode: "Black Santa/White Christmas"
2015	Marry Me	Hailey	Recurring role, 4 episodes
2016–18	Home: Adventures with Tip & Oh	Lucy Tucci (voice)	Main role
2016–19	Elena of Avalor	Rafa (voice)	3 episodes
2016	Elena and the Secret of Avalor	Rafa (voice)	Television film
2017	Charlie Foxtrot	Angelina Torres	TV pilot
2017	Angie Tribeca	Betty Crocker	Episode: "If You See Something, Solve Something"
2017	The Mindy Project	Dr. Mary Hernandez	Recurring role, 4 episodes
2019	Whiskey Cavalier	Susan Sampson	Series regular, 13 episodes
2019	Superstore	Claudia Lankow	Episode: "Sandra's Fight"
2020–22	Love, Victor	Isabel Salazar	Series regular, 28 episodes
2019	Special	Susan	Recurring role, 4 episodes
2022	Undone	Tia Monse (voice)	2 episodes
2023	Monster High 2	Zamara Prue	Television film
2024	Futurama	Marquita (voice)	Episode: "Beauty and the Bug"
2025	Goosebumps	Jen	Main cast (season 2)
2026	Imperfect Women	Detective Ganz	4 episodes

== Awards and nominations ==
Year	Work	Award	Category	Result
2007	Ugly Betty	ALMA Awards	ALMA Award for Outstanding Supporting Actress - Television Series, Mini-Series or Television Movie	Won
2007	Ugly Betty	OFTA Television Award	Outstanding Supporting Actress	Won
2007	Ugly Betty	Imagen Award	Imagen Award for Best Supporting Actress – Television	Won
2007	Ugly Betty	Screen Actors Guild Award	Screen Actors Guild Award for Outstanding Performance by an Ensemble in a Comedy Series	Nominated
2008	Ugly Betty	Ewwy Awards	Best Supporting Actress in a Comedy Series	Nominated
2008	Ugly Betty	Screen Actors Guild Award	Screen Actors Guild Award for Outstanding Performance by an Ensemble in a Comedy Series	Nominated
2008	Ugly Betty	Imagen Award	Imagen Award for Best Supporting Actress – Television	Nominated
2009	Little Girl Lost: The Delimar Vera Story	Imagen Award	Imagen Award for Best Supporting Actress	Nominated
2009	Ugly Betty	Imagen Award	Imagen Award for Best Supporting Actress – Television	Won
2009	Ugly Betty	ALMA Awards	ALMA Award for Outstanding Actress in Television - Comedy	Nominated
2010	Ugly Betty	NAACP Image Awards	NAACP Image Award for Outstanding Supporting Actress in a Comedy Series	Nominated
2013	Devious Maids	ALMA Awards	ALMA Award for Outstanding Actress in Television - Comedy	Nominated
2014	Devious Maids	Imagen Award	Imagen Award for Best Actress - Television	Won
2021	Love, Victor	Imagen Awards	Best Supporting Actress – Comedy	Nominated
