= Michael Cimino (actor) =

American actor (born 1999)

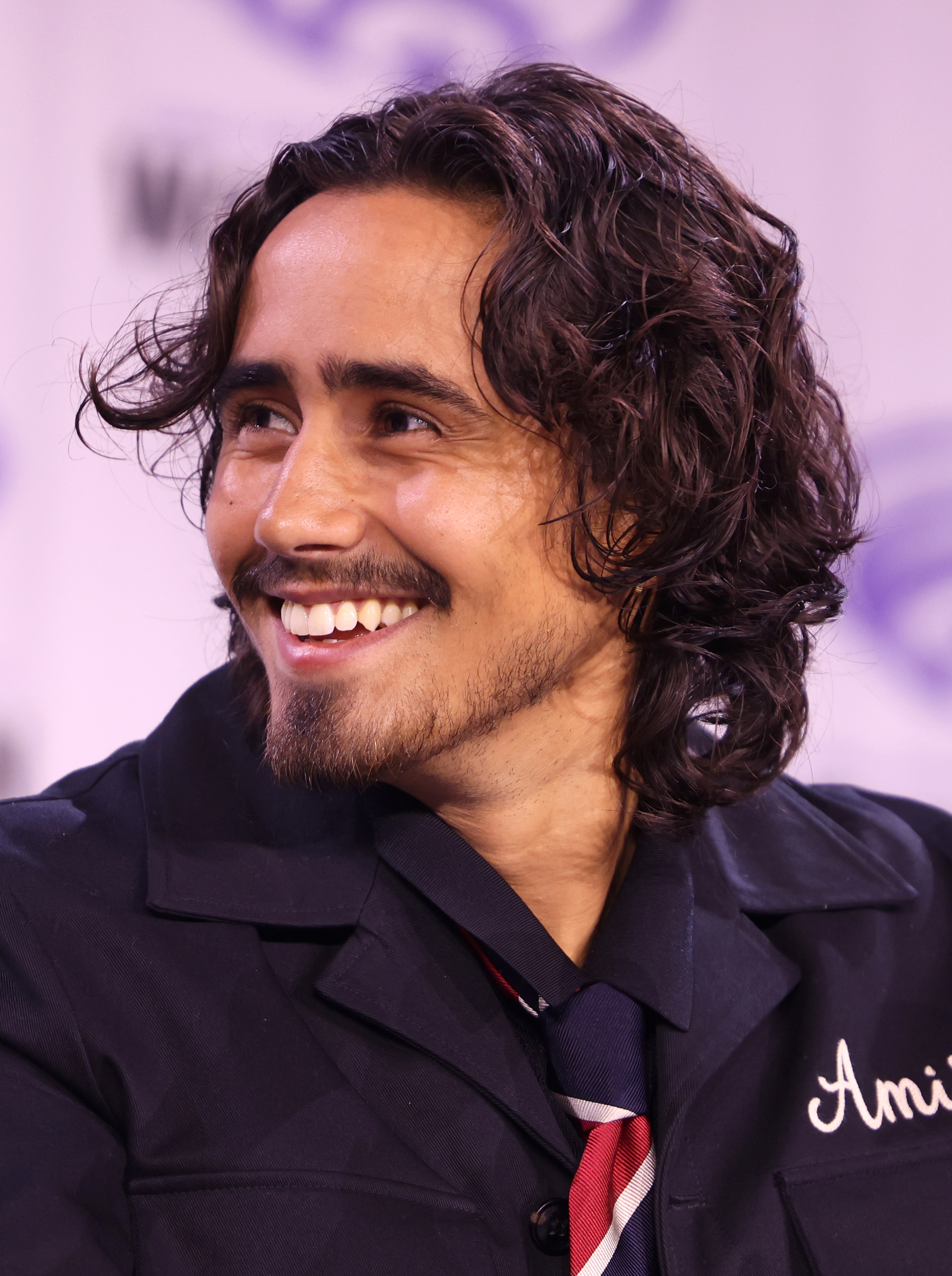
- Cimino in 2025
- Born: November 10, 1999 (age 26); Las Vegas, Nevada, U.S.
- Occupation: Actor
- Years active: 2015–present

Michael Cimino (/sɪˈmiːnoʊ/ sih-MEE-noh; born November 10, 1999) is an American actor. He is known for his roles as Victor Salazar in the Hulu television series Love, Victor, Bob Palmeri in Annabelle Comes Home and Ethan Morales on Never Have I Ever. Since 2022, he has voiced Kevin Grant-Gomez from the Disney Channel animated series Hamster & Gretel. On November 10, 2022, he released his debut EP, I'm Somewhere Out There. For his role in Love, Victor, Cimino was nominated for Imagen Awards for all three seasons of the show, winning consecutive Best Actor - Comedy (Television) awards in 2021 and 2022.

== Early life ==
Cimino was born and raised in Las Vegas, Nevada. He is of Italian-German and Puerto Rican descent. Cimino faced racism throughout elementary school, saying children would throw him on the floor, kick him, and claim he ate bugs, though he says those experiences made him more compassionate towards others. He took up acting at eight years old after joining an acting group taught by a fellow church member. Cimino graduated from high school early to get into acting more seriously and decided not to attend college.

== Career ==
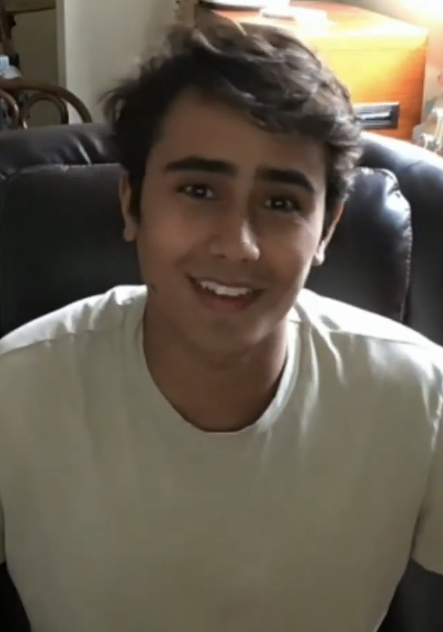
Cimino in 2021

Cimino's early acting credits include a GEICO commercial and a 2016 pilot for the Nickelodeon show Hopefuls. He moved to Los Angeles when he was 18 years old. Cimino appeared in the 2019 horror film Annabelle Comes Home, playing the role of Bob Palmeri. He enjoys singing and playing guitar and had his song "Everything I Own" included on the film's soundtrack.

In August 2019, it was announced Cimino would star in the leading role as Victor Salazar in the Disney+ series Love, Victor. The show was later moved to Hulu, where it premiered in June 2020. Cimino consulted with his gay cousin to ensure the role of Victor would be a relatable and believable character.

In 2020, Cimino joined the voice cast for Black Box, a scripted science fiction podcast series.

On June 15, 2021, Cimino released his first single "Love Addict". He first previewed the song on the June 3, 2021, episode of Good Morning America.

In May 2022, Cimino joined the cast of the thriller podcast series Jane Anonymous, based on the novel of the same name by Laurie Faria Stolarz.

Cimino provides the voice of Kevin in the Disney Channel animated series Hamster & Gretel. He stars as Ethan in the final season of Never Have I Ever, which was released on June 8, 2023.

In June 2024, it was announced that Cimino would star in the film Until Dawn, a film adaptation of the video game. Cimino starred in Girl Haunts Boy, a fantasy romance film released on Netflix in October 2024.

== Personal life ==
Cimino is straight. However, he said of his sexuality, "I don't want to put myself in a box and put myself in a position where if I were to come out as bi or as gay 10 years from now, that I was defending an identity that was being true to myself."

== Filmography ==
=== Film ===
Year	Title	Role	Notes
2015	Limitless Potential	Bob	Short film
2016	Shangri-La Suite	Young Teijo	
2018	Dog Days	Dej	Short film
2019	Annabelle Comes Home	Bob Palmeri	
2019	No Child Left Behind	Brian	
2022	Senior Year	Lance Harrison	
2023	Centurion: The Dancing Stallion	Miguel	
2024	Girl Haunts Boy	Cole Sanchez	
2025	Until Dawn	Max	
2026	Street Smart	Cal	

=== Television ===
Year	Title	Role	Notes
2016	Hopefuls	Lorenzo	Pilot
2016	Slammed	Kyle Mayo	TV film
2017	Training Day	Young Sadiq	Episode: "Tunnel Vision"
2018	Walk the Prank	Brlayden	Episode: "Too Cool for High School"
2020–2022	Love, Victor	Victor Salazar	Main role
2022–2025	Hamster & Gretel	Kevin Grant-Gomez (voice)	Main cast
2022	Disney Theme Song Takeover	Kevin Grant-Gomez (voice)	Episode: "Kevin Theme Song Takeover"
2023	Chibiverse	Kevin Grant-Gomez (voice)	Episode: "The Chibi Quiz Challenge"
2023	How I Met Your Father	Swish	Recurring role (season 2)
2023	Never Have I Ever	Ethan	Recurring role (season 4)
2023–2025	Moon Girl and Devil Dinosaur	Eduardo (voice)	Recurring role
2025	Motorheads	Zac	Main role

== Discography ==
Cimino is also a musician and has released several singles under the Cimino Sings label. He released his debut extended play on November 10, 2022.

=== Extended plays ===
Title	Details
I'm Somewhere Out There	Released: November 10, 2022; Format: Digital download, streaming; Label: Cimino Sings
Superhero	Released: September 12, 2025; Format: Digital download, streaming; Label: Cimino Sings

=== Singles ===
Title	Year	Album
"Love Addict"	2021	Non-album singles
"Little Blue Car"	2021	Non-album singles
"Cigarettes and Incense"	2021	Non-album singles
"Stay The Night" (with Finn Matthews)	2021	I'm Somewhere Out There
"The Love Was Real"	2022	I'm Somewhere Out There
"Make Me Wanna Dance"	2022	I'm Somewhere Out There
"Stole Me"	2022	I'm Somewhere Out There
"I'm Somewhere Out There"	2022	I'm Somewhere Out There
"Superhero"	2025	Superhero
"Reminds Me Of You" (featuring Nate Slater)	2025	Superhero

=== Guest appearances ===
List of other appearances, showing year released, other artist(s) credited and album name
Title	Year	Album
"How You Feel About Me"	2022	Hamster & Gretel
"Overload the Grid"	2022	Hamster & Gretel
"I Can Be Bad"	2022	Hamster & Gretel
"Still Haunted By You"	2024	Girl Haunts Boy
"Old All Star"	2024	Girl Haunts Boy
"No Me Gusta"	2024	Girl Haunts Boy

== Awards and nominations ==
Ceremony	Year (Note: Where available, "Year" is linked to the article for that specific ceremony.)	Category	Nominated work	Result	Ref.
Gold Derby Television Awards	2021	Comedy Actor	Love, Victor	Nominated	
Imagen Awards	2021	Best Actor – Comedy (Television)	Love, Victor	Won	
Imagen Awards	2022	Best Actor – Comedy (Television)	Love, Victor	Won	
Imagen Awards	2023	Best Actor – Drama (Television)	Love, Victor	Nominated	
