= Love, Victor =

2020 American teen drama television series

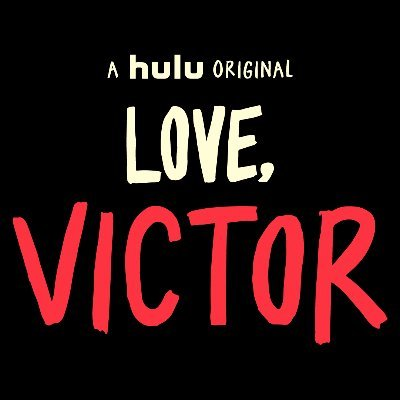
- Genre: Teen drama; Romantic drama; Comedy drama
- Created by: Isaac Aptaker & Elizabeth Berger
- Inspired by: Simon vs. the Homo Sapiens Agenda by Becky Albertalli; Love, Simon by Elizabeth Berger & Isaac Aptaker
- Showrunners: Isaac Aptaker; Elizabeth Berger
- Starring: Michael Cimino; Rachel Hilson; Anthony Turpel; Bebe Wood; Mason Gooding; George Sear; Isabella Ferreira; Mateo Fernandez; James Martinez; Ana Ortiz; Anthony Keyvan; Ava Capri
- Narrated by: Michael Cimino; Nick Robinson
- Music by: Siddhartha Khosla & Lauren Culjak
- Opening theme: "Somebody to Tell Me" by Tyler Glenn
- Country of origin: United States
- Original language: English
- No. of seasons: 3
- No. of episodes: 28

Production
- Executive producers: Isaac Aptaker; Elizabeth Berger; Adam Londy; Brian Tanen; Jason Ensler; Marty Bowen; Adam Fishbach; Wyck Godfrey; Isaac Klausner; Pouya Shahbazian; Rick Wiener; Kenny Schwartz
- Producers: Nick Robinson; Shawn Wilt
- Cinematography: Mark Schwartzbard; JP Wakayama
- Editors: Rebekah Fridman; Shoshanah Tanzer; Jacquelyn Le; Tuan Quoc Le; Jamie Kennedy; Diandra Kendall Luzon; Katie Abel; Kyla Plewes; Kenneth LaMere; Pietro Cecchini
- Running time: 24–34 minutes
- Production companies: Temple Hill Entertainment; No Helmet Productions; The Walk-Up Company; 20th Television (Note: Known as 20th Century Fox Television for the first season.)

Original release
- Network: Hulu; Disney+ (additional; season 3)
- Release: June 17, 2020 – June 15, 2022

Related
- Love, Simon (2018)

Love, Victor is an American teen comedy drama television series created by Isaac Aptaker and Elizabeth Berger, inspired by and set in the same world as the 2018 film Love, Simon. The series premiered on June 17, 2020, on Hulu and ended on June 15, 2022, with 28 episodes over three seasons. It is produced by 20th Television, with Aptaker and Berger serving as showrunners.

Michael Cimino stars as Victor Salazar, a teen from a half Puerto Rican, half Colombian-American family living in Atlanta, alongside George Sear, Rachel Hilson, Bebe Wood, Anthony Turpel, Isabella Ferreira, Ana Ortiz, James Martinez, Mason Gooding, and Mateo Fernandez. Nick Robinson, who starred as the titular Simon in the original film, produces and narrates the series. The second season premiered on June 11, 2021. In July 2021, the series was renewed for a third and final season which premiered on June 15, 2022, and was released simultaneously on Disney+. During the course of the series, 28 episodes of Love, Victor were released over three seasons, between June 17, 2020, and June 15, 2022.

== Premise ==
The first season focuses on a new student at Creekwood High School, Victor. The series follows his journey of self-discovery: facing challenges at home and struggling with his sexual orientation. He reaches out to Simon when it seems too difficult for him to navigate through high school.

The second season deals with the aftermath of his coming out and follows Victor as he navigates through the challenging times with his family, while also dealing with his relationship with Benji, which is tested multiple times, due in part to Victor's family.

In the third season, although they are still in their junior year, Victor, and his friends and family alike find themselves in certain situations and make some tough, yet life-changing decisions for their future outside of Creekwood.

== Cast and characters ==
=== Main ===
- Michael Cimino as Victor Salazar: A new student at Creekwood High School, struggling with his identity surrounding his sexual orientation and adjusting to a new city
- Rachel Hilson as Mia Brooks: Victor's smart friend and ex-girlfriend who has a quick wit and an easy laugh. They dated before Victor came out.
- Anthony Turpel as Felix Westen: Victor's awkward neighbor and best friend
- Bebe Wood as Lake Meriwether: Mia's social media-obsessed best friend. She dated Felix before coming out as queer in the third season and starts dating Lucy.
- Mason Gooding as Andrew: Creekwood's cocky and popular basketball-loving jock
- George Sear as Benji Campbell: Victor's openly gay, confident and charming crush at Creekwood High School. He is Victor's first boyfriend.
- Isabella Ferreira as Pilar Salazar: Victor's goth younger sister troubled with her new life
- Mateo Fernandez as Adrian Salazar: Victor's little brother
- James Martinez as Armando Salazar: Victor's father, a blue-collar man who works hard for his family
- Ana Ortiz as Isabel Salazar: Victor's mother who is under a lot of pressure after a move to a new city
- Anthony Keyvan as Rahim (season 3; recurring season 2), Pilar's friend who comes from a religious Iranian Muslim family who develops a crush on Victor. He later begins a relationship with Connor.
- Ava Capri as Lucy (season 3; recurring season 2), Benji's friend and Andrew's ex-girlfriend who later becomes romantically involved with Lake

Nick Robinson, reprising his role as Simon Spier from Love, Simon, mostly appears via voice-over, narrating Simon's messages to Victor. Robinson appears as Simon in person in the eighth episode of the first season and the tenth episode of the second season. Robinson did not reprise his role in the third season.

=== Recurring ===
- Mekhi Phifer as Harold Brooks, Mia's father
- Abigail Killmeier as Wendy (seasons 1–2), a theater student who Felix takes as his date to the Spring Fling
- Charlie Hall as Kieran, one of Andrew's close friends and a member of the basketball team
- AJ Carr as Teddy, another one of Andrew's close friends and also a member of the basketball team
- Sophia Bush as Veronica (seasons 1–2; guest season 3), Mia's father's new girlfriend, and later wife, who runs a non-profit organization for women
- Lukas Gage as Derek (season 1; guest season 2), Benji's ex-boyfriend
- Betsy Brandt as Dawn Westen (season 2–3), Felix's mother who suffers from mental health issues
- Julie Benz as Shelby (season 2), Armando's new friend and later love interest he met at a PFLAG meeting
- Nico Greetham as Nick (season 3), a boy who attends the Salazars' church and a love interest for Victor
- Tyler Lofton as Connor (season 3), a waiter and love interest for Rahim

=== Guest ===
- Leslie Grossman as Georgina Meriwether, a local news host and Lake's mother
- Andy Richter as Coach Ford, the physical education teacher and varsity basketball coach
- Beth Littleford as Sarah (seasons 1–2), the manager of the coffee house where Victor and Benji work
- Will Ropp as Wyatt (seasons 1–2), one of Andrew's close friends
- Ali Wong as Ms. Thomas (season 1), Creekwood's sex education teacher
- Steven Heisler as Roger (season 1), Armando's former boss with whom Isabel had an affair
- Keiynan Lonsdale as Bram Greenfeld (season 1), Simon Spier's boyfriend, reprising his role from Love, Simon
- Katya Zamolodchikova as herself (season 1), performing at the gay club Messy Boots in NYC
- Tommy Dorfman as Justin (season 1), Bram and Simon's roommate
- Natasha Rothwell as Ms. Albright (season 1), vice principal at Creekwood, previously the school's drama teacher, reprising her role from Love, Simon
- Terri Hoyos as Natalia Salazar (season 1), Victor's grandmother
- Juan Carlos Cantu as Tito Salazar (season 1), Victor's grandfather
- Jason Collins as himself (season 1), playing basketball with a group of gay men
- Josh Duhamel as Jack Spier (season 2), Simon Spier's father, reprising his role from Love, Simon
- Daniel Croix as Tyler (season 2), Mia's friend she met at a college function
- Kevin Rahm as Charles Campbell (season 2–3), Benji's father
- Sean O'Bryan as Father Lawrence (season 2), the pastor of the Salazar's church
- Embeth Davidtz (season 2) and Amy Pietz (season 3) as Margaret Campbell, Benji's mother
- Nicholas Hamilton as Charlie (season 2), an online crush of Rahim's
- Carlie Hanson as a bandmate of Benji's (season 2)
- Artemis Pebdani as Rahim's mother (season 3)
- Tracie Thoms as Naomi (season 3), Mia's estranged mother
- Nia Vardalos as Theresa (season 3), a parent Isabel and Armando meet at a PFLAG meeting
- Eureka O'Hara as herself (season 3), performing at a gay bar
- Joshua Colley as Liam (season 3), a closeted gay student at Victor's school

== Episodes ==
=== Series overview ===
Season	Episodes	Originally released	Network
1	10	June 17, 2020	Hulu
2	10	June 11, 2021	Hulu
3	8	June 15, 2022	Hulu / Disney+

=== Season 1 (2020) ===
No. overall	No. in season	Title	Directed by	Written by	Original release date	Prod. code
1	1	"Welcome to Creekwood"	Amy York Rubin	Teleplay by : Isaac Aptaker & Elizabeth Berger	June 17, 2020	1CFG01
Victor and his family move from Texas to Atlanta. Victor's younger sister, Pilar, resents having to leave her old life and boyfriend behind. Victor reluctantly becomes friends with unpopular classmate Felix, who lives in the same building. At school, Victor meets Mia and her best friend Lake and develops a crush on openly gay student Benji. Victor is invited to join the basketball team but clashes with another member of the team, Andrew, who ridicules Victor for not being as affluent as several other members of the basketball team. Victor learns about Simon Spier's coming out story at Creekwood and messages him via social media; Simon replies that he is there for Victor if he ever needs to talk. At the Winter Carnival, Victor sees both Mia and Benji but, wanting to fit in, decides to ask Mia to ride the Ferris Wheel with him.
2	2	"Stoplight Party"	Jason Ensler	Brian Tanen	June 17, 2020	1CFG02
Victor has been catapulted into popularity after going on the Ferris Wheel with Mia, who is starting to have feelings for him. Mia and Lake plan a "stoplight" party, where students wear colors according to their relationship status. Victor begins working at a local coffee shop where Benji also works, Brasstown, in order to make money to join the basketball team. At the party, Victor struggles to fit in. Felix pines for Lake, who instead likes Andrew. At home, Pilar breaks up with her boyfriend back in Texas, while Isabel and Armando face marital problems. Victor shares a tender moment with Mia and messages Simon that he might like her.
3	3	"Battle of the Bands"	Pilar Boehm	Jen Braeden	June 17, 2020	1CFG03
Victor asks Mia out and plans to take her to a Battle of the Bands being hosted at Brasstown. Lake asks Andrew to go with her to the competition, who agrees in order to spend time with Mia. Benji and Victor bond while working together, and Victor learns that Benji will be performing at the Battle of the Bands. Worried that being around Benji will distract him from his date with Mia, Victor instead chooses to take her to an art exhibition, where they share their first kiss. Victor and Mia eventually end up catching the end of the Battle of the Bands, and Victor's crush on Benji grows after watching him perform. However, it is revealed that Benji has a boyfriend, Derek. Lake discovers that Andrew is in love with Mia. Meanwhile, Pilar helps her mother Isabel by setting up a Facebook account for her, and is shocked when a man named Roger R. sends a friend request to the new profile and starts flirting with her.
4	4	"The Truth Hurts"	Michael Lennox	Marcos Luevanos	June 17, 2020	1CFG04
Pilar, suspicious that Isabel is having an affair, is heartbroken. She shares the news with Victor, who does not believe that their mother would cheat but is persuaded into setting up a meeting up with Roger from Facebook by pretending to be Isabel. Victor sees Roger in person and is shocked to discover that he is the former boss of their father, Armando. Victor and Mia bond over Mia's sadness that her father is dating a new woman and moving on from her mother. At a basketball game, Victor confronts his parents about Isabel's affair and learns that Armando is already aware of it. Pilar and Victor are shocked to learn their family moved to Atlanta to help their parents recover from the aftermath of the affair.
5	5	"Sweet Sixteen"	Anne Fletcher	Sheila Lawrence	June 17, 2020	1CFG05
The Salazars have not been close since the confrontation the previous week, upsetting Victor. Simon warns Victor to make time for himself, while Victor shares he hopes to figure out his identity. Victor's sixteenth birthday is coming up and a party is being thrown. All of Victor's extended family and friends are coming, including Mia and Benji. Felix and Lake get closer while running an errand for the party. At the party, Victor's conservative grandparents accidentally see Benji and Derek kissing, which angers them; Victor and Isabel stand up for Benji. Mia and Pilar bond over their respective family struggles. Victor and Mia kiss and decide to begin a relationship. Armando warns Victor that Adrian might be gay and that he is not happy about it.
6	6	"Creekwood Nights"	Anu Valia	David Smithyman	June 17, 2020	1CFG06
Mia and Lake discuss Mia's relationship with Victor. She wants the relationship to be more than it is and is interested in sex after the class takes sex-ed. Benji is coming up on his first anniversary with Derek, where the two bond about how they are romantics. Victor confides in Benji that he is a virgin and is hesitant to have sex with Mia. Benji shares that if he can do it, anyone can. Nervous, Victor brings Felix with him, much to Mia's chagrin. Benji plans a nice evening for Derek, but he is not happy with it. Felix and Lake kiss for the first time. Lake suggests that Victor is gay, so he tries to force himself to go further than kissing with Mia. Ultimately, he cannot and says he is "not ready". She accepts this. Simon tells Victor he is not attracted to Mia and to end things before she gets hurt.
7	7	"What Happens In Willacoochee"	Jay Karas	Danny Fernandez	June 17, 2020	1CFG07
Victor is viewing dating Mia as a chance to be normal. Mia asks him to attend a fundraiser with him and meet her Dad, and he accepts. Andrew pines over Mia at the fundraiser and Victor does not turn up. Lake tells Felix that their hook-up never happened, but Felix wants more. Benji and Victor are forced to take a road trip to repair the coffee machine from their workplace. Felix bonds with Pilar, who gives him advice on Lake that later impresses her. Victor tells Benji that they must stay in a motel overnight to wait for the coffee machine to be fixed as he sees this as an opportunity for him to figure out his sexuality. At the motel, Benji reveals he came out because he almost died one night after driving drunk while trying to deny his sexuality. Benji tells Victor he is easy to talk to and is happy they are friends. Later that night, Victor kisses Benji, who pushes Victor away as he is still with Derek. Horrified, Victor texts Simon who reassures him about who he is. Benji suggests they do not talk about the kiss.
8	8	"Boys' Trip"	Todd Holland	Brian Tanen	June 17, 2020	1CFG08
Victor takes a trip to visit Simon in New York City, where he is shown around town by Simon's group of accepting friends as Simon is out of state. He tells family and friends he is on a basketball weekend. This annoys Mia as Victor is once again leaving, so she grows closer to Andrew. At detention, Andrew and Mia learn that Lake and Felix have been hooking up. Embarrassed, Lake upsets Felix by saying she wants to keep their relationship quiet. Felix challenges Andrew's bullying. Andrew asks Mia if she sees him as a "good guy". She says deep down she thinks he is but who cares about that when on the surface he is not. While at a drag party, Simon's friends accidentally let slip to Victor that they were all aware of Victor's situation at school and with Benji. Victor feels he has been betrayed. Simon shows up and explains to an angry Victor that he needed to draw on his friends' experiences to help counsel him. Victor reconciles with Simon and his friends.
9	9	"Who the Hell is B?"	Rebecca Asher	Jeremy Roth & Jess Pineda	June 17, 2020	1CFG09
Victor comes out to Felix, the first person he has told. Victor is distraught to learn that Benji, due to the kiss, will be working elsewhere. Simon advises Victor to write a letter to Benji and see if he will forgive him. Isabel and Armando continue to fight, which upsets Victor and Pilar. Felix continues his romance with Lake and learns that she has an overbearing mother. To make her feel better, he shows her his apartment. His mother is a hoarder and he points out that their parents and where they live are not who they are. But Lake still will not go to the school dance with him as she cares too much about what other people think. Felix breaks up with her. Later, Pilar finds a note to B in his jacket pocket. She is unaware that it is Victor's note to Benji.
10	10	"Spring Fling"	Jason Ensler	Teleplay by : Jillian Moreno; Story by : Isaac Aptaker & Elizabeth Berger	June 17, 2020	1CFG10
Benji gets Victor's note but tells Victor that he needs his space. Victor plans to take Mia to the Spring Fling and tell her the truth the day after. Felix and Lake go to the dance with separate partners, but end up reconciling and kissing in front of the whole school, their relationship now public. Felix accidentally tells Pilar that the note was about an incident on Victor's work trip. When Pilar questions Benji about it, Derek overhears; Benji and Derek break up after. While talking to Victor, Benji confesses Derek did not make him feel good like Victor does and that he wants to be with someone who does, and they kiss confessing their feelings for each other, which Mia witnesses unbeknownst to the two. Victor, to protect his relationship with Benji, promises him he will come out to everyone eventually. When Mia confronts Victor about his kiss with Benji and questions whether he liked her, he asserts that parts of their relationship were real. Pilar confronts Victor about him cheating, but he insists that he still is the same person. Comforted, Pilar and Victor head home, where their parents announce that they will separate. Despite the news, Victor comes out to his parents.

=== Season 2 (2021) ===
No. overall	No. in season	Title	Directed by	Written by	Original release date	Prod. code
11	1	"Perfect Summer Bubble"	Jason Ensler	Isaac Aptaker & Elizabeth Berger	June 11, 2021	2CFG01
After Victor comes out to his family, Pilar immediately accepts him though their parents fail to do the same. At the end of summer vacation, Isabel is still struggling to accept his sexuality. Armando, who has grown more supportive of Victor's identity, is living in a new home after separating from Isabel. When Victor invites Benji and his friends over for dinner, Isabel throws out her meal in an attempt to avoid spending time with Victor and Benji and ultimately fakes indigestion to secure an early exit. Mia arrives back from her job as a camp counselor and feels isolated from her friends. Victor and his friends head to Lake Lanier where he shares a moment with Benji, realizing they have each other to lean on even when things get hard. His father tells Isabel that they have no choice but to accept Victor for who he is. Felix's mother, Dawn, is suffering from severe depression that has resulted in her losing her job and has put her and Felix at risk of eviction. Victor, frustrated at how Isabel has failed to acknowledge his relationship with Benji, tells her to refer to Benji as his boyfriend from now on.
12	2	"Day One, Take Two"	Alex Hardcastle	Brian Tanen	June 11, 2021	2CFG02
Victor is excited to come out on the first day of his junior year, but Isabel makes him doubt himself. When Victor's teammates ask him if he is still dating Mia, he panics and says that they are broken up, which spirals into a rumor that Mia cheated on Victor. When some boys slut-shame Mia at school, Victor gets into a fight and is sent to detention. Meanwhile, Felix tries to find ways to raise money to keep his family from being evicted. He confides his issues to Pilar, who gives him her savings. At home, Armando and Isabel talk to Victor, and Victor snaps at Isabel for her lack of support. Armando suggests they should start going to PFLAG meetings, but Isabel refuses. After a talk with Benji, who says he can keep their relationship a secret at school for as long as they need to, Victor publicly clears Mia of any wrongdoing before officially coming out. He and Benji walk down the hall and share their first public kiss.
13	3	"There's No Gay in Team"	Alex Hardcastle	JC Lee	June 11, 2021	2CFG03
Someone on the basketball team complains to Coach Ford about not feeling comfortable with Victor in the locker room. He tries to reach a compromise by offering Victor his own private space in the lockers, but this just makes Victor feel unwelcomed by his own team. Mia starts dating a college freshman named Tyler, who invites her to a college party after she lies about her age. Armando attends his first PFLAG meeting, which is led by Simon's father Jack. The two meet at a bar afterwards, where Jack gives Armando advice on how to support Victor. Felix starts a side hustle doing other people's homework for cash in an attempt to pay back Pilar and help his mother. Lake finds out and bails on going to the college party with Mia to help him do the homework. She also helps Felix pay back Pilar. Mia gets drunk at the party, where Derek (Benji's ex boyfriend) sees her and calls Victor and Benji to come get her. Victor and Mia talk through their break up and resolve to still be friends. Tired of the team's homophobia, and disappointed in Andrew for not stepping up as Captain to help him, Victor quits basketball.
14	4	"The Sex Cabin"	Jason Ensler	Jillian Moreno & Alex Freund	June 11, 2021	2CFG04
Unable to find some privacy for a long time, Benji invites Victor, Felix, and Lake to his family's lake cabin, where Victor and Felix both plan to lose their virginities. Victor is terrified, as he knows nothing about gay sex, and tries to contact Simon, only for the cabin to have no signal. Felix worries that Lake does not find him attractive when she keeps dodging opportunities for them to be alone together. Andrew and his new girlfriend Lucy join the others at the cabin. Mia and Tyler also try to come only for his car to blow a tire that he forces Mia to change. Tired of his poor attitude, Mia walks the rest of the trip to the cabin. Armando and Isabel spend their Saturday trying to find Adrian's pet turtle, which results in them sleeping together. After a shaving mishap on Felix's part, he finally comes clean to Lake, who reveals that she has had body issues her whole life and fears Felix not finding her attractive. The two go skinny dipping before having sex on the dock. Victor tells Benji he is scared of having sex. The two cuddle and fall asleep together. The next morning, after a message from Simon telling him that only he and Benji are in charge of their sex lives, Victor tells Benji he loves him and initiates their first time together, which Benji reciprocates.
15	5	"Gay Gay"	Kristin Windell	Marcos Luevanos	June 11, 2021	2CFG05
Victor feels lost at Creekwood after quitting the basketball team, but refuses to come back even as Andrew begs him to reconsider. Isabel keeps dodging Armando's attempts to have her attend PFLAG meetings. She visits Father Lawrence, who tells her that she needs to steer Victor back to God. Armando tells her to either accept Victor's sexuality, or they will not reconcile. Felix invites Lake to dinner with his mother, but the meal goes wrong when Dawn has a manic episode. Felix makes Lake promise not to tell anyone. Victor goes to Benji's band concert, but feels even more unsure of himself when the bandmates make jokes about his appearance. Later, Andrew plays one on one basketball with Victor. Victor reveals that he is tired of having to justify his sexuality to everyone. Andrew and the team dye their hair pink as an apology, making Victor rejoin the team. Benji also apologizes for his friends by participating in a group dance for the team. After Lucy breaks up with Andrew, he realizes his feelings for Mia and kisses her.
16	6	"Sincerely, Rahim"	Sarah Boyd	Michelle Lirtzman	June 11, 2021	2CFG06
Pilar's friend Rahim reaches out to Victor for help with coming out to his traditional Muslim parents. Victor invites Rahim to their apartment to talk in private, only for Isabel to come home early and offer surprisingly helpful advice for Rahim. Victor takes this as a sign that Isabel is starting to change and takes her up on an earlier offer to attend a church service that she will be singing at. Meanwhile, Mia rushes Veronica to the hospital after she has early contractions. Andrew comes to the hospital, where Mia decides to take a chance on their relationship and invites him to her father's wedding. Victor is approached by Father Lawrence, who tells him that his mother is praying for his return to God. Outside the church, Victor finally confronts his mother. Isabel owns up to her actions, and vows to work harder to accept Victor. Concerned about Felix, Lake talks to her mother, who in turn tells Felix about a therapist that can help Dawn for free. Felix then talks to Dawn about the offer, which sparks a manic episode resulting in Dawn being committed to a mental health facility for 72 hours. Hurt by the prospect of losing his mother, Felix breaks up with Lake. Child Services allow Felix to stay with the Salazars for the time being.
17	7	"Table for Four"	Satya Bhabha	Jeremy Roth	June 11, 2021	2CFG07
It is Benji's birthday and Victor plans to celebrate with him. But when he learns from Benji's parents that Benji does not drink and has been in Alcoholics Anonymous for a year, they get into a fight over him never telling Victor. Lake tries to win back Felix with a romantic date at the aquarium. Felix meets her there, and while he understands that she was trying to help his family, whenever he sees Lake he just feels sadness from losing his mother. He reveals that she is being held indefinitely at the hospital before telling Lake that it is over. Isabel tries to attend a PFLAG meeting and sees Armando flirting with a single mother. She and Armando agree to see other people. Benji apologizes to Victor and promises he is working on himself and they kiss. Isabel comes home and walks in on Victor and Benji having sex.
18	8	"The Morning After"	Natalia Leite	Sarah LaBrie	June 11, 2021	2CFG08
Victor and Benji have sex, but Isabel walks in on them. This leads to a confrontation with her and Benji, in which a heated Benji outs Victor to Adrian. Stunned, Victor asks Benji to leave. The next morning, the Salazars finally tell Adrian that Victor is gay, and he happily supports it. Mia is upset to learn her father is making her move to California after the wedding, and debates reconnecting with her estranged mother. She makes him promise to not take the job, but he goes back on his word. After Benji gets angry at Victor for not siding with him against Isabel, Victor tells Benji that he will never understand his experience coming out to Latino parents. Felix and Pilar grow closer and she kisses him. Father Lawrence tells Adrian that Victor may go to hell for being gay, pushing Isabel to finally stand up for her son and quit the church. Victor confides in Rahim, and they bond over being gay People of Color. Benji and Victor make up, but after learning Victor told Rahim Benji's secrets, Benji says that they should take a break.
19	9	"Victor's Day Off"	Kevin Rodney Sullivan	Brian Tanen	June 11, 2021	2CFG09
Overwhelmed by strained relationships with Benji and Isabel, Victor decides to skip school with Rahim. Throughout the day, they see Armando on a date with a friend of his from PFLAG. After having a fun evening at a gay bar downtown, Isabel finds the boys after spending the day looking for them. Victor confides that he is worried Benji is going to breakup with him, and he was scared to tell her because he thought she would be happy that his first gay relationship is ending. Isabel apologizes for how she has handled Victor's coming out, and promises that she loves and accepts him for who he is. After dropping off Rahim, Victor gets a call from Benji saying they need more time apart and that he will not be his date to Mia's father's wedding. Ready to be a better mother to Victor, Isabel comforts him.
20	10	"Close Your Eyes"	Jason Ensler	Isaac Aptaker & Elizabeth Berger	June 11, 2021	2CFG10
As Mia's father's wedding approaches, their relationship becomes strained after Harold reveals he is taking the job in California. Reeling from his breakup with Benji, Victor invites Rahim to the wedding. Felix's mother returns home and tells him how much Lake's help meant to her. Isabel apologizes to Benji, which makes him reconsider his relationship with Victor. Benji goes to the wedding, but sees Victor dancing with Rahim and storms off. Rahim confesses that he has feelings for Victor and he kisses Victor. He tells Victor that he should figure out his feelings. Felix dances with Lake but becomes conflicted by his new feelings for Pilar. Victor and Felix talk about what they should do and help each other realize who they want to be with. Felix goes after Pilar and kisses her. Lake decides to spend time with Lucy. Armando and Isabel decide to give their marriage another chance. Andrew and Mia sneak out of town to meet Mia's mother. As Victor heads to reunite with his choice, he takes a call from Simon. Victor thanks Simon for his help but lets him know he has grown enough that he will not need his advice in the future.

=== Season 3 (2022) ===
No. overall	No. in season	Title	Directed by	Written by	Original release date	Prod. code
21	1	"It's You"	Jason Ensler	Brian Tanen	June 15, 2022	3CFG01
It is revealed that Victor chose Benji, and they relive their first real kiss on the school bench. Meanwhile, Rahim waits for Victor to show up, but is comforted by his mother after he does not. Felix and Pilar grow closer and Felix wants to tell Pilar's parents about their relationship, but she is resistant due to her overprotective father. Lake continues to hang out with Lucy and they almost kiss, until Lake panics and backs away. Armando and Isabel announce that they are back together. Benji reveals that he has been drinking again and decides to go to rehab for three weeks. Mia goes to visit her mother, unsuccessfully trying to convince her to move to Creekwood.
22	2	"Fast Times at Creekwood High"	Melissa Kosar	Marcos Luevanos	June 15, 2022	3CFG02
Victor struggles with Benji being away. Felix is upset that Pilar is hiding their relationship from her parents, but after talking with Victor, comes to understand why. Victor convinces Rahim to be friends again after apologizing for not acknowledging that there was something between them. Lake finally kisses Lucy. Mia throws a party and Victor & Andrew both get high. Upon Lucy and Pilar's insistence, Lake and Felix speak privately and give each other closure regarding their breakup. Isabel attends her first PFLAG meeting and admits that she is not ready to forgive herself for not accepting Victor before. Benji returns from rehab and breaks up with Victor for the sake of his recovery.
23	3	"The Setup"	Steven Canals	Rick Wiener & Kenny Schwartz	June 15, 2022	3CFG03
Victor is struggling after his breakup. Isabel and Armando find an LGBT-friendly church and invite Victor to check it out. They meet another couple with a gay son named Nick and attempt to set the two boys up. Victor is initially resistant, but ends up liking Nick and they have sex in Nick's parents car. Rahim turns out to be Benji's new calculus tutor. Felix and Pilar meet Felix's mother's new boyfriend, and Felix is hostile toward him until Pilar convinces him to let his mother live her life. Lake and Lucy have sex for the first time. Mia moves in with Lake while her father starts his new job at Stanford.
24	4	"You Up?"	Jason Ensler	Michelle Lirtzman	June 15, 2022	3CFG04
Victor and Nick continue hooking up regularly, but when Victor asks Nick on a date, Nick reveals that he only wants a casual relationship. Lake begs Mia to go with her mother for a shopping day because she does not enjoy being constantly criticized. Mia tries to convince Lake that her mother does love her and she should tell her about Lucy. Pilar's parents find out about Pilar and Felix's relationship. Armando is initially angry, but Isabel convinces him to let Pilar have some freedom. She later finds birth control pills in Pilar's room. Lake finally asks her mother to stop being so critical of her and also reveals her relationship with Lucy. Victor breaks things off with Nick and joins a dating site. Rahim helps Benji get an A− and Benji helps Rahim "act straight" when his extremely religious uncle comes to town.
25	5	"Lucas and Diego"	Randall Winston	Debby Wolfe	June 15, 2022	3CFG05
Rahim and Andrew help Victor create a dating profile under the name "Diego" with a picture of Andrew's abs. He chats with a boy named Lucas and they arrange to meet up, but it turns out to be Benji and they spend the evening together. Benji's father gets Benji's drunk driving incident expunged from his record, but Benji is still troubled by memories of the incident. Pilar's parents forbid her from seeing Felix after finding the pills, even when she tries to explain they have not had sex yet. Pilar sneaks out to see Felix and tries to have sex with him, but he tells her to wait as he wanted their first time to be special. She accuses him of valuing her parents' approval above her and leaves angrily. Benji's father asks Victor to stay away from Benji, claiming he was the cause of his relapses.
26	6	"Agent of Chaos"	Jason Ensler	Nasser Samara	June 15, 2022	3CFG06
Mia is upset when Veronica goes into labor early and she cannot be there for her baby brother's birth. Victor realizes that a classmate named Liam is closeted and wants to be "his Simon" and help him through it, but Liam misunderstands and tries to kiss Victor. He then runs away when Victor turns him down. Rahim's mother lies to his uncle that Pilar is Rahim's girlfriend and the four of them go out for dinner, where a waiter named Connor flirts with Rahim. Andrew sets up a video call with Veronica and Mia's father so that Mia can feel like she is there with them. Victor runs into Nick at church and Nick apologizes for how he treated Victor. Armando tells her that he and Isabel lost a baby in their teenage years, which is why he is overprotective. He says she can see Felix again. Lucy reveals that she is graduating early and moving to Portland at the end of the semester. Rahim tells his mother that he never wants to hide who he is again, and she agrees. Pilar breaks up with Felix, feeling that it was too easy for him to choose her family over her. Nick shows up at Victor's house with flowers and asks him to dinner.
27	7	"The Gay Award"	Natalia Leite	Alex Freund & Jillian Moreno	June 15, 2022	3CFG07
Nick wants to take things slow with Victor this time. Victor is told he is getting a bravery award for his experience of coming out while on the basketball team, and has mixed feelings about accepting it. Felix's mother's boyfriend breaks up with her. Victor and Nick go on a double date with Rahim and Connor. Andrew and Mia go to visit her father, Veronica, and the new baby, but Andrew does not tell Mia that he missed an important game with college recruiters to make the trip. Benji starts questioning whether avoiding Victor is really the best thing for him. Rahim confronts some homophobic guys at dinner and admits to Victor that he is upset about Victor not wanting the bravery award, because he does not have the privilege of choosing when to be seen as gay. Lake decides to break up with Lucy. Mia starts to question her decision to stay in Creekwood. Victor decides to accept the award, and Rahim shares his first kiss with Connor. Benji approaches Victor's house to talk, but sees Victor kissing Nick and decides to go to boarding school.
28	8	"Brave"	Jason Ensler	Isaac Aptaker & Elizabeth Berger	June 15, 2022	3CFG08
Mia has decided to move to be with her family. Lake and Felix get closer after he comforts her post-breakup. Benji tells Victor he is going to boarding school. Armando quits his job after fighting with his homophobic boss. Mia finally tells Andrew that she's moving and breaks up with him. Victor accepts his award and gives a speech about how bravery means not being afraid to be scared, but his speech also makes it clear to Nick that he is not over Benji and they break up. Victor tells Benji he is not over him, but Benji says he is too late as he already decided to leave. Lake and Felix share a kiss, but she tells him they cannot get back together because she is in love with Lucy. Victor's speech inspires everyone in different ways - Mia decides to be brave and agrees to do long-distance with Andrew, Lake tells Lucy she can move into her mother's extra condo in Creekwood after she graduates and they get back together, Armando and Isabel decide to start their own company, Felix apologizes to Pilar for not prioritizing her. It is shown that Nick and Liam have also gotten together while Victor decides to ride the Ferris wheel alone. Right when Victor is about to climb into the Ferris wheel, Benji shows up after having changed his mind, and he and Victor get back together and kiss on the Ferris wheel.

== Production ==
=== Development ===
In April 2019, Disney+ gave the 20th Century Fox Television–produced show – based on the film Love, Simon – a straight-to-series order, with the writers of the original movie, Isaac Aptaker and Elizabeth Berger, attached as showrunners. The show would focus on brand new characters and would be set in the same world as the movie.

"Love, Simon is a powerful story embraced by critics and audiences alike for its universal messages of authenticity, love, and acceptance. We are honored to partner with the talented team at 20th Century Fox Television to bring this new chapter of a beloved story to Disney+, continuing the personal and uplifting narrative that captivated fans of the original film."

— Agnes Chu (SVP content, Disney+)

In February 2020, the series was retitled Love, Victor and moved to Hulu, with a scheduled premiere date in June 2020, making it the second series – after High Fidelity – to move from Disney+ to Hulu. In April 2020, it was announced that the series was scheduled to premiere on June 19, 2020. On June 10, 2020, the premiere date was moved up to June 17, 2020, to give Juneteenth its own day in the spotlight. On August 7, 2020, Hulu renewed the series for a second season which premiered on June 11, 2021, and consists of 10 episodes. On July 30, 2021, Hulu renewed the series for a third season. On February 8, 2022, Hulu announced that the third season will be its last.

=== Casting ===
In June 2019, Ana Ortiz was cast as Isabel. In mid-August, the series' full cast was announced, with Michael Cimino as the lead, Victor. Also announced were James Martinez as Armando, Isabella Ferreira as Pilar, Mateo Fernandez as Adrian, Johnny Sequoyah as Mia, Bebe Wood as Lake, George Sear as Benji, Anthony Turpel as Felix, and Mason Gooding as Andrew. It was also announced that Nick Robinson, who starred in the film, would produce and narrate the series. Later that month, it was reported that Rachel Hilson had been cast as Mia, replacing Sequoyah. The recast was made in order to take the character in a new creative direction. On October 23, 2019, it was also announced that Sophia Bush had been cast as Veronica, Mia's father's new girlfriend.

In November 2020, Betsy Brandt was announced as having been cast in the second as Dawn, Felix's mother, who struggles with mental health issues. Ava Capri and Anthony Keyvan were also announced as joining the second-season cast. In March 2022, Nico Greetham was booked in a recurring role for the final season.

=== Filming ===
Filming began in August 2019, in Los Angeles, with Amy York Rubin directing the first episode. Filming for the second season began on November 9, 2020. Filming for the third season began on November 8, 2021.

=== Music ===
The soundtrack EP for the first season, featuring three new songs by LGBT artists and all co-written by Leland, was released on June 19, 2020, by Hollywood Records.

Songs from Love, Victor: Season 1 (Original Soundtrack) track listing
No.	Title	Writer(s)	Performer(s)	Length
1.	"Somebody Tell Me" (Theme song from Love, Victor)	Jordan Palmer; Leland	Tyler Glenn	2:48
2.	"Athlete"	Greyson Chance; Palmer; Leland	Greyson Chance	3:12
3.	"God, This Feels Good"	Palmer; Leland; Isaac Dunbar	Isaac Dunbar	3:18
Total length:				9:18

The soundtrack album for the second season, featuring eight new songs by LGBT artists and all co-written by Leland, was released on June 11, 2021, by Hollywood Records. Season 2 also featured Blonde Maze's version of "Fade Into You" in episode 4.

Love, Victor: Season 2 (Original Soundtrack) track listing
No.	Title	Writer(s)	Performer(s)	Length
1.	"Heaven Is a Hand to Hold"	Leland; Duncan Laurence; Jordan Garfield; Peter Thomas	Duncan Laurence	2:43
2.	"She Said"	Leland; Cari Fletcher; Sydney Cubit	Fletcher	2:48
3.	"FYI"	Leland; Britten Newbill; Josiah Wise	Serpentwithfeet	3:24
4.	"Young Love"	Leland	Carlie Hanson and George Sear	3:07
5.	"Windows"	Leland; Newbill; Tayla Parx	Tayla Parx	3:17
6.	"Horizontal"	Alice Longyu Gao; Leland; Madison Love; Thomas	Alice Longyu Gao	2:59
7.	"Private Life"	Alexandra Hughes; Leland; Thomas	Allie X	4:23
8.	"Infinity"	Leland; Fancy Hagood; James Abrahart; Thomas	Fancy Hagood	3:19
Total length:				26:02

The soundtrack EP for the third and final season, featuring three new songs by LGBT artists and all co-written and produced by Leland, was released on June 15, 2022, by Hollywood Records. The EP also includes a cover of the 1982 hit "Only You" by Yazoo.

Songs from Love, Victor: Season 3 (Original Soundtrack) track listing
No.	Title	Writer(s)	Performer(s)	Length
1.	"Mission"	Vincint Cannady; Leland	Vincint	2:39
2.	"Armageddon"	Leland	Black Polish	2:57
3.	"Dinner"	Leland	Grag Queen	2:53
4.	"Only You"	Vince Clarke	Jonah Mutono	2:27
Total length:				9:18

== Release ==
The series premiered on June 17, 2020, pushed up from a June 19 release date, on Hulu in the United States. Internationally, the series premiered on Disney+ under the dedicated streaming hub Star on February 23, 2021. The second season was released on June 11, 2021, on Hulu and premiered internationally on June 18, 2021, on Disney+'s Star. On Disney+, the first two seasons episodes premiered on a weekly basis.

The 8-episode third and final season was released on June 15, 2022. On that date, Love, Victor was also made available in the United States on Disney+. Internationally, the complete season was released simultaneously on Disney+'s Star. In the United Kingdom, the series was acquired by BBC Three and BBC iPlayer.

== Reception ==
=== Viewership ===
Whip Media, which monitors consumers' viewing habits worldwide, reported that Love, Victor was the most anticipated new television series in June 2020. It also became the top show on the rise, based on week-over-week growth in episodes watched, during the week ending June 21, 2020. Hulu announced that the series was the most-watched drama on the platform during its premiere week in June 2020. The series was also the most-binged original drama on Hulu during its first week and the second-most binged original overall, after Solar Opposites. According to market research company Parrot Analytics, which looks at consumer engagement in consumer research, streaming, downloads, and on social media, Love, Victor saw a 180.1% month-on-month increase in demand from May to June 2021. Following its June 2021 premiere, demand for the series surged by 485.6% week-over-week. In June 2022, Whip Media's TV Time app, which tracks viewership data for the more than 21 million worldwide users, reported that the show was the fifth most-watched original series during the week of June 19, 2022.

=== Critical response ===
For the first season, review aggregator Rotten Tomatoes reported an approval rating of 90% based on 49 reviews, with an average rating of 7.13/10. The website's critics consensus reads, "Michael Cimino charms in Love, Victor, a sincere and sweet—if safe—spin-off with a lot of heart." Metacritic gave the series a weighted average score of 69 out of 100, based on 21 critics, indicating "generally favorable reviews".

The second season has a 100% approval rating on Rotten Tomatoes, with an average score of 8.1/10 based on 23 reviews. The website's critics consensus states, "Grounded by its talented cast, Love, Victor grows into itself with a mature second season that confronts difficult situations with care."

The third season holds an 87% approval rating on Rotten Tomatoes, with an average score of 7.8/10 based on 15 reviews. The website's critics consensus states, "Love, Victor signs off with a valentine to its viewers, delivering a gentle denouement full of grace notes."

=== Accolades ===
Year	Ceremony	Category	Nominee(s)	Result	Ref.
2021	Dorian Awards	Best LGBTQ TV Show	Love, Victor	Nominated	
2021	Dorian Awards	Best Unsung Show	Love, Victor	Won	
2021	GLAAD Media Awards	Outstanding Comedy Series	Love, Victor	Nominated	
2021	Gold Derby Television Awards	Comedy Actor	Michael Cimino	Nominated	
2021	Gold Derby Television Awards	Comedy Series	Love, Victor	Nominated	
2021	Imagen Awards	Best Lead Actor – Comedy	Michael Cimino	Won	
2021	Imagen Awards	Best Primetime Program – Comedy	Love, Victor	Won	
2021	Imagen Awards	Best Supporting Actor – Comedy	James Martinez	Nominated	
2021	Imagen Awards	Best Supporting Actress – Comedy	Ana Ortiz	Nominated	
2021	ReFrame Stamp	IMDbPro Top 200 Scripted TV Recipients	Love, Victor	Won	
2022	Casting Society of America Awards	Television Pilot and First Season – Comedy	Josh Einsohn, Tiffany Little Canfield, Conrad Woolfe	Nominated	
2022	GLAAD Media Awards	Outstanding Comedy Series	Love, Victor	Nominated	
2022	Imagen Awards	Best Actor – Comedy (Television)	Michael Cimino	Won	
2022	Imagen Awards	Best Supporting Actor – Television (Comedy)	James Martinez	Nominated	
2022	Imagen Awards	Best Primetime Program – Comedy	Love, Victor	Won	
2023	GLAAD Media Awards	Outstanding Comedy Series	Love, Victor	Nominated	
