= Anthony Turpel =

American actor

- Born: January 26, 2000 (age 26); Los Angeles
- Occupations: Actor; Media personality
- Years active: 2015–present
- Television: Love, Victor; The Bold and the Beautiful

Anthony Turpel (born January 26, 2000) is an American actor known for his role as Will in the Netflix series No Good Nick (2019). He received a Daytime Emmy Award nomination for Outstanding Younger Actor for his performance as R.J. Forrester on The Bold and the Beautiful (2016–18). Turpel has also appeared in films such as Baby Blue (2023), Culdesac (2017), and Play Dead (2012). In 2020, he gained broader recognition for his portrayal of Felix in Hulu's teen comedy-drama series Love, Victor. Additionally, he had a recurring role in episode four of Monsters: The Lyle and Erik Menendez Story (2024).

== Early life ==
Anthony Turpel was born on January 26, 2000, in Los Angeles, California. He became interested in acting at a young age and began performing in school plays.

== Career ==
Turpel made his television debut with guest roles in various popular TV shows. One of his early notable appearances was in Henry Danger (2015), a Nickelodeon sitcom. However, it wasn't until 2016 that he earned significant attention as R.J. Forrester on the long-running CBS soap opera The Bold and the Beautiful. He portrayed the character from 2016 to 2018 and became widely recognized for his performance. His portrayal of R.J., the son of Brooke Logan (Katherine Kelly Lang) and Ridge Forrester (Thorsten Kaye).

Turpel continued to expand his career in television and gained broader recognition in 2020 when he was cast as Felix Weston in the Hulu original series Love, Victor. The show is a spin-off of the 2018 film Love, Simon and follows the journey of Victor Salazar as he navigates high school, relationships, and questions of sexual identity. Anthony's character Felix, who is Victor's quirky, loyal, and humorous best friend, quickly became a fan favorite. His role in Love, Victor earned him praise for his comedic timing and the portrayal of a relatable and endearing character.

In 2024, Turpel made his professional stage debut at The Hudson Theatre in Los Angeles, portraying the role of Van in Bert V. Royal’s play, Dog Sees God: Confessions of a Teenage Blockhead.

== Filmography ==
=== Film ===
Year	Title	Role	Notes
2022	Play Dead	T. J. Albright	
2023	Baby Blue	Baby Blue	
2025	The Hermit	Eric	

=== Television ===
Year	Title	Role	Notes
2015	Comedy Bang! Bang	Dylan Darcy	
2015	Henry Danger	Steve	Episode: "My Phony Valentine"
2015	Life in Pieces	Max	Episode: "Babe Secret Phone Germs", Uncredited
2015	Future Shock	Ethan	
2016–2018	The Bold and the Beautiful	R.J. Forrester	Main cast; 95 episodes
2019	9-1-1	Freddie	2 episodes
2019	No Good Nick	Will	4 episodes
2020–2022	Love, Victor	Felix	Main cast
2021	This Is Us	Stage manager	Episode: "Brotherly Love"
2022	Quantum Leap	Roy Bacall	Episode: "Stand by Ben"
2024	That '90s Show	Theo	Recurring Role (season 2)
2024	Monsters: The Lyle and Erik Menendez Story	Donovan Goodreau	Episode: "Kill or Be Killed"
2025	Doctor Odyssey	Connor	Episode: "Spring Break"

== Awards and nominations ==
Year	Event	Category	Result	Ref
2017	Daytime Emmy Award	Outstanding Younger Actor in a Drama Series	Nominated	
