= Ava Capri =

American actress

- Born: 12 November 1995 (age 30); Los Angeles, California, United States
- Occupation: Actress
- Years active: 2015–present

Ava Capri is an American actress. She is best known for playing Lucy in the teen drama series Love, Victor.

== Early life ==
Capri was born in Los Angeles. She acted when she was younger but stopped for a while before taking it up again after high school. She has named Lizzy Caplan as an actress she would love to work with.

== Career ==
Capri's film work includes the independent films When Time Got Louder and Blast Beat.

Capri's first major role in a TV series was as Lucy in the drama series Love, Victor, where the character started out with a boyfriend but ended up coming out as lesbian. She has said she hopes the character makes queer people feel seen.

She had a recurring role as Jen Fox in the rebooted slasher teen series Pretty Little Liars.

== Personal life ==
Capri is queer.

== Filmography ==
=== Film ===
Year	Title	Role	Notes
2016	I'm an Actor	Ava	Short
2018	Write When You Get Work	Maxine Schotz	
2018	Staties	Felicity King	
2019	Mary and Margaret	Margaret	Short
2019	The Experience	Dylan	
2020	Blast Beat	Alana	
2020	For Your Consideration	Christa	Short
2020	Embattled	Keaton Carmichael	
2022	When Time Got Louder	Karly	
2022	Do Revenge	Carissa Jones	
2022	December	Moe	Short
2022	Reply	Hayden Riley	Short
2024	Endling	Bat Zenilman	Short
2025	Good Time Charlie	Girl	Short

=== Television ===
Year	Title	Role	Notes
2015	Parks and Recreation	Evangeline	Episode: "Gryzzlbox"
2018	Tagged	Olive	3 episodes
2021–2022	Love, Victor	Lucy	Recurring role (season 2-3); 14 episodes
2024	Pretty Little Liars	Jen Fox	7 episodes
