= Girl Haunts Boy =

2024 film by Emily Ting

- Poster
- Directed by: Emily Ting
- Written by: Cesar Vitale
- Story by: Dustin Ellis
- Produced by: Bill Andrew; Sirad Balducci; Mark Burton; Dustin Ellis; Ryan Malachowsky; Aaron Parry; Gloria Ponce; Tracy K. Price; Tamara Rothenberg; Jill Sanford
- Starring: Peyton List; Michael Cimino
- Cinematography: Rob Givens
- Edited by: Lisa Binkley; Matthew Diezel
- Music by: Keegan DeWitt
- Production companies: Fifth Season; Wonder Worldwide
- Release date: October 10, 2024
- Running time: 100 minutes
- Country: United States
- Language: English

Girl Haunts Boy is a 2024 American romantic fantasy film directed by Emily Ting and starring Peyton List and Michael Cimino.

== Plot ==
In 1928, spirited teenager Beatrix Jenkins visits the Spectral Valley Museum during a school field trip. Drawn to a mysterious pearl ring in a restricted exhibit, she sneaks into a closed-off section to examine it. Before she can return the ring, she is spotted by a security guard. To avoid punishment, she tries to distract him and flees the museum. Tragically, she is struck by a car and killed instantly. Unbeknownst to her, the ring is cursed, and her spirit becomes bound to it, leaving her to haunt her family home for nearly a century.

In the present day, 17-year-old Cole Sanchez moves into Bea’s former house with his mother after his father's death. While exploring his new room, Cole finds the pearl ring. Upon wearing it, he begins experiencing supernatural events and eventually meets Bea’s ghost. Initially frightened, Cole becomes intrigued by Bea, and the two develop an unlikely friendship. As they grow closer, Bea encourages Cole to rediscover his passion for music, which he abandoned due to grief.

With the help of his classmate Lydia, Cole learns that the ring is part of a cursed pair. The curse states that anyone who separates the rings will be doomed to die violently and have their spirit trapped until the rings are reunited. Despite his feelings for Bea, Cole realizes she deserves peace and helps her retrieve the second ring.

Once the rings are reunited, the curse is lifted—not by sending Bea to the afterlife but by transporting her back to the 1920s. In the final moments, Cole finds an old photo album revealing that Bea lived a full and happy life, becoming a pilot, marrying, and growing old surrounded by family. Though saddened by her departure, Cole finds closure and a renewed sense of purpose.

== Cast ==
- Michael Cimino as Cole Sanchez
- Peyton List as Beatrix "Bea" Jenkins
- Phoebe Holden as Lydia Anderson
- Andrea Navedo as Catarina Sanchez

== Production ==
Filming occurred in Montclair, New Jersey.

== Release ==
The film was released on Netflix and VOD on October 10, 2024.

== Reception ==
The film has a 92% rating on Rotten Tomatoes based on 12 reviews. Jennifer Borget of Common Sense Media awarded the film three stars out of five. Matt Mahler of MovieWeb scored the film a 3 out of 5.
