= The New Normal (TV series) =

2012 American comedy series

- Genre: Sitcom
- Created by: Ryan Murphy; Ali Adler
- Starring: Justin Bartha; Andrew Rannells; Georgia King; Bebe Wood; NeNe Leakes; Jayson Blair; Ellen Barkin
- Music by: James S. Levine
- Country of origin: United States
- Original language: English
- No. of seasons: 1
- No. of episodes: 22

Production
- Executive producers: Dante Di Loreto; Ali Adler; Ryan Murphy
- Production location: Paramount Studios
- Cinematography: Christopher Baffa; Michael Goi
- Camera setup: Single-camera
- Running time: 30 minutes
- Production companies: Ali Adler is Here Productions; Ryan Murphy Productions; 20th Century Fox Television

Original release
- Network: NBC
- Release: September 10, 2012 – April 2, 2013

The New Normal is an American sitcom television series that aired on NBC from September 10, 2012, to April 2, 2013. The series was created and principally written by Ryan Murphy and Ali Adler. The storyline follows wealthy gay couple Bryan (Andrew Rannells) and David (Justin Bartha), who are living in Los Angeles. Deciding to have a child, they choose a surrogate mother, Goldie Clemmons (Georgia King), who moves into their home with her 9-year-old daughter Shania (Bebe Wood). The series aired Tuesdays at 9:30 pm Eastern/8:30 pm Central after the new comedy series Go On, as part of the 2012–13 United States network television schedule. On October 2, 2012, NBC commissioned a full season of The New Normal.

On May 11, 2013, NBC cancelled the series after one season.

== Plot ==
Bryan (Andrew Rannells) and David (Justin Bartha) are a happy gay couple living in Los Angeles, with successful careers. The only thing missing in their relationship is a baby. They meet Goldie Clemmons (Georgia King), a single mother and waitress from Ohio. Goldie left her adulterous husband and moved to L.A. with her 9-year-old daughter Shania (Bebe Wood) to escape their former life and start over. Jane (Ellen Barkin), Goldie's conservative grandmother, follows them to the city against Goldie's wishes, thus causing havoc for her granddaughter and the couple. Goldie decides to become Bryan and David's gestational surrogate, and naturally, her family gets involved.

== Cast and characters ==
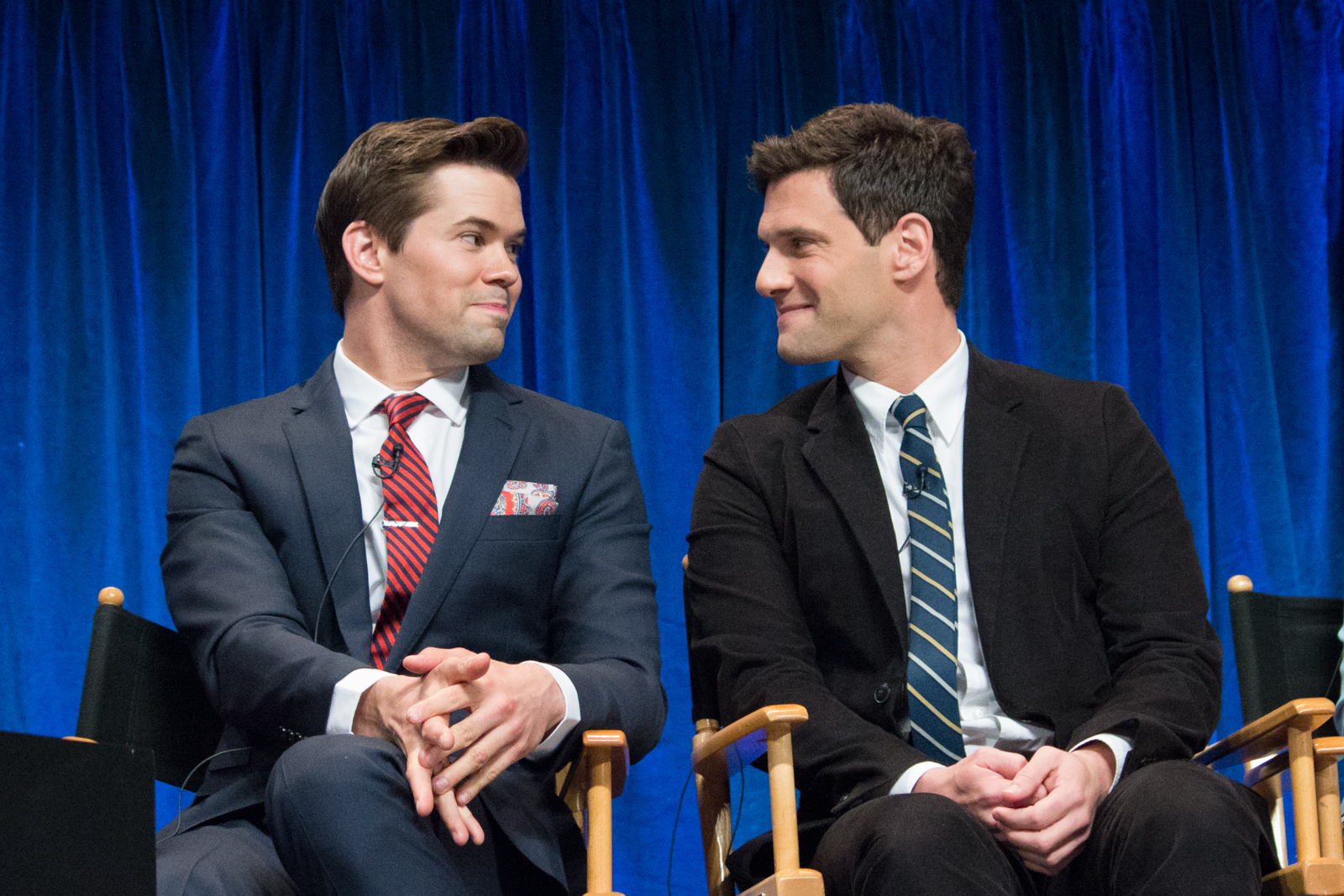
Andrew Rannells and Justin Bartha at PaleyFest 2013

=== Main cast ===
- Justin Bartha as David Bartholomew Sawyer, an obstetrician
- Andrew Rannells as Bryan Collins, a television producer who is the showrunner for the hit television series Sing (a thinly veiled spoof of series creator/showrunner Ryan Murphy's real-life television series Glee.)
- Georgia King as Goldie Clemmons, David and Bryan's surrogate. A shy working-class waitress from Ohio, she runs off to California with her daughter Shania after finding her husband Clay in bed with another woman, and signs up to be a surrogate in hope of using the money to achieve a dream of going to law school, though she eventually chooses to follow her passion and starts designing clothing for children.
- Bebe Wood as Shania Clemmons, Goldie and Clay's 9-year-old daughter.
- NeNe Leakes as Rocky Rhoades, Bryan's production assistant (P.A.) and later a producer on Sing.
- Jayson Blair as Clay Clemmons, Goldie's estranged husband and Shania's father.
- Ellen Barkin as Jane Forrest, Goldie's grandmother. A staunchly Republican real-estate agent prone to making outrageously racist and homophobic statements, she follows Goldie and Shania to California and is unwilling to return to Ohio without them.

=== Recurring cast ===
- Jackie Hoffman as Frances, David's mother
- Barry Bostwick as Marty, David's father
- Mary Kay Place as Colleen, Bryan's mother
- Marlo Thomas as Nancy Niles, Jane's boss
- Cheri Oteri as Carla, Bryan and David's baby consultant
- John Stamos as Brice, Jane's love interest and co-worker at Niles and Windsor Realtors
- Michael Hitchcock as Gary, the head of the surrogacy firm
- John Benjamin Hickey as Father Michael
- Sterling Sulieman as Clint, Rocky's brother

== Episodes ==
No.	Title	Directed by	Written by	Original release date	Prod. code	U.S. viewers (millions)
1	"Pilot"	Ryan Murphy	Ryan Murphy & Ali Adler	September 10, 2012	1AVS79	6.88
David and Bryan are a Los Angeles couple with successful careers and a committed, loving relationship but they want a baby. After some disastrous attempts at finding a surrogate into their lives comes Goldie, a single mother from Ohio looking to start over in California with her eight-year-old daughter Shania. Goldie specifically said she wanted to be a surrogate for a gay couple and Bryan and David couldn't be happier. Until Goldie's conservative grandmother Jane arrives to bring her and Shania back to Ohio.
2	"Sofa's Choice"	Ryan Murphy	Ryan Murphy & Ali Adler	September 11, 2012	1AVS01	6.96
Shania begins impersonating Little Edie from Grey Gardens, much to the delight of Bryan. David and Bryan's decision to have a night out on the town like they did when they were younger doesn't go as planned. Jane attempts to get Goldie to go back to Ohio by having her ex-husband Clay woo her.
3	"Baby Clothes"	Ryan Murphy	Ryan Murphy	September 18, 2012	1AVS02	6.08
David insists that they not get too far ahead of things but Bryan can't resist buying some adorable baby clothes. During a group trip to an outlet store David and Bryan are confronted by some people who are very hostile to the idea of two men having children. Shania wears one of the baby tops to school and gets a bit too intimate with a boy in her class.
4	"Obama Mama"	Scott Ellis	Ali Adler	September 25, 2012	1AVS03	5.09
Shania is excited about her school's mock election and proudly tells Bryan and that, unlike her mother, she will be voting for Barack Obama. Jane accuses them of corrupting her great-granddaughter into voting for the Democrats, and they are shocked that Goldie would support the Republicans like her grandmother, considering Mitt Romney's views on same-sex marriage and same sex parenting. Bryan and David have a dinner party in an attempt to show Jane they have a diverse group of friends.
5	"Nanagasm"	Miguel Arteta	Adam Barr	October 2, 2012	1AVS04	4.50
David decides to tell his mother about the baby. Bryan and Goldie bond over mother-in-law woes. Jane picks up a younger man in the hotel bar and has an unfamiliar sensation during their sexual encounter in her room. Jane is so troubled by it that she seeks out David's medical advice. Shania is worried that her father might get custody of her and so she has been working on her California bucket list.
6	"Bryanzilla"	Ryan Murphy	Mark Kunerth	October 9, 2012	1AVS05	4.86
When Shania announces that she is "pretend engaged" to a boy at school Bryan is thrilled with the announcement and begins planning what is to be the wedding of his dreams for her. Goldie supports her daughter's decision but Jane is absolutely against the wedding because she believes a wedding isn't something to play with. David comes to understand just how important a wedding and marriage is to Bryan.
7	"The Godparent Trap"	Miguel Arteta	Mike Scully	October 23, 2012	1AVS06	4.33
Bryan gets to thinking about growing up Catholic and what religion meant to him. When Rocky explains what it means to be her niece's godmother David and Bryan decide they need to find someone who can be a spiritual guide for their baby. They reach out to their friends Tiffany (Constance Zimmer) and Victoria (Leisha Hailey), who are the only religious couple they know, only to discover that their inability to have children would make being godparents a very difficult situation for them. Bryan goes to church and has a surprising conversation with Father Michael (John Benjamin Hickey).
8	"Unplugged"	Max Winkler	Aaron Lee	November 13, 2012	1AVS08	4.66
Goldie feels that the family is too immersed in their technology rather than actually spending time together so she proposes that they all go tech-free for the weekend. Shania takes the proposition a little too seriously and starts acting like a pilgrim. Rocky sets Jane up with her very first Twitter account which doesn't go as planned as she uploads a personal video of Bryan's that he was planning to show David on their wedding day with the #gayestvideoever.
9	"Pardon Me"	Max Winkler	Moshe Kasher	November 20, 2012	1AVS09	4.29
This Thanksgiving, the family decides to have a girls and gays Thanksgiving including just Bryan, David, Goldie, Shania and Rocky. Although this seems like a good idea, David tells his mother about the idea and is forced to invite her. Shania proposes that they invite everyone's family but that doesn't quite go as planned. While Bryan and Shania go to buy a turkey for lunch, Shania is heartbroken when she looks in their eyes, and she convinces Bryan to buy the lot and take care of them and to have an all vegetarian with a tofu turkey or "tofurkey." When Jane finds out about the vegetarian meal, she decides to take matters into her own hands and kill one of Shania and Bryan's turkeys and cook it herself. David finds his divorced parents sleeping together in their guest house and Clint gets in a fight with Clay over Goldie. In the end, everyone is sent home and they have their girls and gays Thanksgiving after all
10	"The XY Factor"	Elodie Keene	Erin Foster	November 27, 2012	1AVS10	4.04
Bryan and David accidentally learn the baby's gender; Shania's performance at a school assembly as Cher reminds Goldie she has dreams to pursue; Shania gets suspended.
11	"Baby Proofing"	Max Winkler	Robert Sudduth	December 4, 2012	1AVS11	4.55
David hires Carla, a baby proofer to make the house safer, but instead of creating a sense of security, it puts a wedge between him and Bryan causing them to bicker. Meanwhile, in the process of decorating the Christmas tree and getting into the holiday spirit, it is revealed that eggnog makes Jane an unusually nice person. Later, Bryan and Jane attend a Hollywood party at the home of Nancy Niles (Marlo Thomas), Los Angeles realtor to the stars, that will turn out to be the boost that Jane has been looking for
12	"The Goldie Rush"	Elodie Keene	Ryan Murphy	January 8, 2013	1AVS12	3.23
David and Bryan decide that they would like Goldie to be their surrogate once again after their son is born, meanwhile, Bryan's ex-boyfriend Monte (Matt Bomer) returns to town and begins causing trouble.
13	"Stay-at-Home Dad"	Bradley Buecker	Ali Adler	January 15, 2013	1AVS13	3.33
Bryan and David begin to debate on who should be the stay-at-home dad once their son arrives to take care of him. Meanwhile, Rocky fills in for Bryan on Sing.
14	"Gaydar"	Elodie Keene	Adam Barr	January 22, 2013	1AVS14	3.28
Jane and Rocky become interested in men they meet at work and enlist Shania, Bryan and David's help in staging a "gay test" to determine their respective orientations. Meanwhile, Bryan and David disagree on the outfit their son will wear in his birth announcement photo.
15	"Dairy Queen"	Bradley Buecker	Mark Kunerth	January 29, 2013	1AVS15	3.08
Brian and David ask Goldie if she would breast feed their baby when it's born, to which she gladly accepts their offer. Shania gets upset after she discovers that Goldie didn't breast feed her as a baby. After a desperate attempt to get Brice to ask her out, Jane enlists the help of Rocky.
16	"Dog Children"	Wendey Stanzler	Mike Scully	February 19, 2013	1AVS16	2.80
David and Bryan's dog is rushed to the hospital. Meanwhile, Goldie falls in love with Shania's school principal after being called in because Shania is acting like people from various British television shows.
17	"Rocky Bye Baby"	Paris Barclay	Karey Dornetto	February 26, 2013	1AVS17	2.62
Rocky throws a baby shower for Bryan and David, but the shower ropes Rocky, Bryan and David into a foster parent situation. Meanwhile, Jane doesn't know what to get Bryan and David for the baby shower.
18	"Para-New Normal Activity"	Burr Steers	Karey Dornetto	March 5, 2013	1AVS07	2.44
It's Halloween and Bryan immediately takes charge in telling everyone what to wear. But the rest of the group have grown tired of following his each and every command and decides to take Halloween into their own hands. Due to Hurricane Sandy coverage, this episode aired out of order. It was not broadcast until many months later. For plot consistency, it belongs after "The Godparent Trap" and before "Unplugged".
19	"Blood, Sweat and Fears"	Elodie Keene	Aaron Lee	March 19, 2013	1AVS18	2.10
David and Bryan consider alternative birthing options, while Shania helps baby sit Rocky's new baby.
20	"About a Boy Scout"	Scott Ellis	Mark Kunerth & Karey Dornetto	March 26, 2013	1AVS19	3.32
David, a former Eagle Scout, jumps at the chance to chaperone a Cub Scout overnight. But when one father disagrees with his lifestyle, his Scout membership is revoked. Meanwhile, Rocky helps Goldie deal with her secret crush on Brice.
21	"Finding Name-O"	Elodie Keene	Aaron Lee & Adam Barr	April 2, 2013	1AVS20	4.46
David and Bryan try to think of a name for their baby. Goldie reveals the origin of Shania's name, leading to brief identity crises for both of them. David suggests that Bryan invite his mother (Mary Kay Place) to their wedding, but her added opinion leads to more conflict and an unusual resolution. Meanwhile, following some advice from Shania, Clay decides to let Goldie know how he feels.
22	"The Big Day"	Max Winkler	Ali Adler & Ryan Murphy	April 2, 2013	1AVS21	3.39
The wedding is finally here and Bryan and David are dead set on getting married before the arrival of their baby, but their baby has other ideas.

== Development and production ==
Promotional image featuring the cast: (left to right) Justin Bartha, Andrew Rannells, Georgia King, Bebe Wood, Ellen Barkin, and NeNe Leakes.

On January 27, 2012, NBC officially ordered the project to pilot, which was co-written by co-creators/executive producers Ryan Murphy and Ali Adler, while being directed by Murphy.

Casting announcements began in January 2012, with Andrew Rannells first cast in the role of Bryan Collins, one half of the gay couple who decides to use a surrogate to have a baby. Ellen Barkin was next cast in the series as Jane Forrest, Goldie's Republican grandmother. Justin Bartha and Georgia King both then joined the series. Bartha signed on to play David Bartholomew Sawyer, the other half of the aforementioned gay couple; and King joined the series as Goldie Clemmons, a cash-strapped waitress and mother, who becomes Bryan and David's surrogate. Bebe Wood followed with her cast in the role of Shania Clemmons, Goldie and Clay's daughter. NeNe Leakes was the last actor cast in the series as Rocky, Bryan's assistant.

On May 7, 2012, the show was picked up to series. It premiered on September 11, 2012. Jayson Blair originally signed on to the series as Clay Clemmons, in a recurring role. However, after the pilot was ordered to series, Blair was then upped to series regular.

The Halloween episode "Para-New Normal Activity" was originally scheduled to air on October 30, 2012, but was pre-empted by NBC's coverage of Hurricane Sandy. The episode was ultimately aired in March 2013.

== Marketing ==
On August 29, 2012, NBC released the pilot episode online as a "preview", prior to the official premiere on September 11, 2012. A similar marketing strategy was made with The New Normal's time-slot companion Go On, which aired its first episode on August 8, 2012, post the 2012 Summer Olympics.

== Release ==
=== Critical reception ===
The New Normal received mixed reviews from critics. The first season received a 61 out of 100 aggregate score, based on 32 critics' responses, indicating "mixed or average" reception at Metacritic. Review aggregator website Rotten Tomatoes rated it 51% "rotten" based on 47 reviews with average rating of 5.90 out of 10 with the consensus, "The New Normal is heartfelt and briskly paced, but it suffers from one-dimensional characters and jarring tonal shifts.". Robert Bianco of USA Today called it a "surprisingly touching comedy," adding "For the most part, Normal plays like a lovely, small movie, mixing humorous moments with sweet, gentle grace notes. At its best, it plays like a Woody Allen film, something you may notice most when secondary characters stop and explain themselves to the camera." Linda Stasi of the New York Post thought the series was "pretty darned good," adding "The New Normal finds its game when it's funny without trying so hard and sweet when it should be. At times Normal is so touching you might pull out a tissue, or maybe a diaper." Ken Tucker of Entertainment Weekly gave the series a B grade, saying it contains "a mixture of sarcasm and sentimentality that isn't remotely realistic, but can be funny." David Hinckley of the New York Daily News called the series "a bumpy ride," adding "The New Normal wants what Modern Family is having. But if we're going to catapult from South Park to a Hallmark movie, we need a smoother ride."

On August 24, 2012, representatives from KSL-TV, the NBC affiliate in Salt Lake City, Utah, announced the station, which is owned by the Church of Jesus Christ of Latter-day Saints, would not carry The New Normal, citing content they believed to be inappropriate for broadcast during the family hour. KUCW, the state's CW affiliate, picked up the series and aired it on Saturday nights.

The show has been criticized for perpetuating racial stereotypes and using a person born intersex as an object of derision.

== Home media ==
Fox Home Entertainment released the complete series on DVD on May 13, 2014, titled "The New Normal - The Complete 1st Season". The item was released exclusively from online retailer Amazon.com.

== Broadcasts ==
In Canada, CTV held the rights to simsub the NBC broadcast in most areas.

In Mexico, it was broadcast by Fox. In Greece, it was broadcast by Foxlife. Exclusive Fox first-run contracted broadcasters have the rights in Australia on Network Ten from October 14, 2012, with the show being preempted twice due to ratings, in New Zealand on TV3 (New Zealand) from March 21, 2013, and in Israel on the yes pay television network scheduled for Saturday at 7 pm.

In other areas the rights have been acquired for the United Kingdom by Channel 4 on E4 from January 10, 2013, at 9 pm.

== Awards and nominations ==
Awards and nominations for The New Normal
Year	Award	Category	Recipient	Result
2013	People's Choice Awards	Favorite New TV Comedy		Won
2013	Art Director's Guild Awards	Episode of a Half Hour Single-Camera Television Series	Episode: Sofa's Choice	Nominated
2013	GLAAD Media Award	Outstanding Comedy Series		Won
2013	ASC Award	Outstanding Achievement in Cinematography in Half-Hour Episodic Television Series	Episode: Pilot	Nominated
2013	Young Artist Awards	Recurring Young Actor Ten and Under	Thomas Barbusca	Nominated
2013	Young Artist Awards	Guest Starring Young Actress Ten and Under	Kyla Kenedy	Nominated
