= Bebe Wood =

American actress

- Born: Kansas City, Missouri, United States
- Occupation: Actress
- Years active: 2011–present

Bebe Wood is an American actress. She is known for her roles as Shania Clemmons in the NBC television series The New Normal, as Shannon on the ABC television series The Real O'Neals, and as Lake Meriwether on the Hulu Original series Love, Victor. She portrayed Gretchen Weiners in the musical movie adaptation of Mean Girls in 2024.

== Early life ==
Wood was born in Kansas City, Missouri. She has said that she has wanted to be an actress since she was three years old.

Her role as Gretchen Wieners in Mean Girls features a nod to her Cuban heritage.

== Filmography ==
=== Films ===
Year	Title	Role	Notes
2014	A Merry Friggin' Christmas	Vera Mitchler	
2021	Trollhunters: Rise of the Titans	Shannon Longhannon (voice)	
2024	Mean Girls	Gretchen Wieners	

=== Television ===
Year	Title	Role	Notes
2011	Submissions Only	Lizzie Walken	Episode: "The Miller/Hennigan Act"
2012	30 Rock	Cat	Episode: "Murphy Brown Lied to Us"
2012	Veep	Student	Episode: "Baseball"
2012–2013	The New Normal	Shania Clemmons	Main role
2013–2014	See Dad Run	Amanda Sullivan	4 episodes
2014	About a Boy	Katie	Episode: "About a Kiss"
2015	Wet Hot American Summer: First Day of Camp	Young Abby	Episode: "Lunch"
2016–2017	The Real O'Neals	Shannon O'Neal	Main role
2016–2018	Trollhunters: Tales of Arcadia	Shannon Longhannon (voice)	4 episodes
2018	American Housewife	Ellen	Episode: "Blondetourage"
2018–2019	3Below: Tales of Arcadia	Shannon Longhannon (voice)	9 episodes
2020–2022	Love, Victor	Lake Meriwether	Main role
2020	Wizards: Tales of Arcadia	Shannon Longhannon (voice)	Episode: "Wizard Underground"
2023	Accused	Jessie	Episode: "Jessie's Story"

=== Audio ===
Year	Title	Role	Notes
2021	Kate in Waiting	Kate	Audiobook - Main role

== Discography ==
=== Extended plays ===
Title	Details
21st Century Hippie	Released: 15 October 2021; Format: Digital download
