= 2021 Imagen Awards =

36th Annual Imagen Awards

- Date: October 10, 2021
- Location: Virtual
- Hosted by: Aida Rodriguez; Chuey Martinez; Isabella Gomez; Karrie Martin Lachney
- Website: www.imagen.org/awards/

Television/radio coverage
- Network: PBSSoCal.org and KECT.org

The 36th Annual Imagen Awards, presented by the Imagen Foundation to honor Latino talent and contributions within television and film, were held on October 10, 2021 with the winners announced via a virtual ceremony on PBSSoCal.org and KECT.org.

== Winners and nominees ==
The nominations were announced on August 2, 2021 by Helen Hernandez, the President of The Imagen Foundation.

Winners in each category are listed first, in boldface.

=== Film ===
Best Feature Film	Best Director - Feature Film
**I'm No Longer Here**; La Llorona; Mucho Mucho Amor: The Legend of Walter Mercado; REEFA; Words on Bathroom Walls	**Fernando Frías De La Parra – I'm No Longer Here**; Cristina Costantini and Kareem Tabsch – Mucho Mucho Amor: The Legend of Walter Mercado; Christina Costantini and Darren Foster – Own the Room; Jayro Bustamante – La Llorona; Jessica Kavana Dornbusch – REEFA; Ángel Manuel Soto – Charm City Kings
Best Actor - Feature Film	Best Actress - Feature Film
**Demián Bichir – Land as Miguel Borrás**; Julio Díaz – La Llorona as Enrique Monteverde; Juan Daniel García – I'm No Longer Here as Ulises Sampiero; Pedro Pascal – Wonder Woman 1984 as Maxwell "Max Lord" Lorenzano	**Aubrey Plaza – Black Bear as Allison**; María Mercedes Coroy – La Llorona as Alma; Eiza González – I Care a Lot as Fran; Margarita Kenéfic – La Llorona as Carmen; Jenna Ortega – Yes Day as Katie Torres

=== Television ===
Best Primetime Program – Drama	Best Primetime Program – Comedy
**Pose (FX)**; Queen of the South (USA Network); Who Killed Sara? (Netflix); Selena: The Series (Netflix); This Is Us (NBC); Mayans M.C. (FX); Veneno (HBO Max)	**Love, Victor (Hulu)**; ¿Quién es la máscara? (Televisa); Mr. Iglesias (Netflix); Genera+ion (HBO Max); Superstore (NBC); Vida (Starz)
Best Primetime Program – Special or Movie	Best Variety or Reality Show
**One Day at a Time – Animated Special (Pop TV)**; David Byrne's American Utopia (HBO); Fuse Town Hall: Our Votes Matter (Fuse); Gina Brillon: The Floor is Lava (Amazon Prime); Mariah Carey's Magical Christmas Special (Apple TV+); Unpregnant (HBO Max)	**A Tribute to Linda Ronstadt at The Soraya (PBS)**; **Shine True (Fuse)**; Cuidate y Cuentate (LATV Network); Go-Big Show (TBS); Gordon Ramsay: Uncharted (National Geographic); Pati's Mexican Table (American Public Television)
Best Young Adult Programming	Best Youth Programming
**Julie and the Phantoms (Netflix)**; Ashley Garcia: Genius in Love – Part 2 (Netflix); Onyx Equinox (Crunchyroll); Genera+ion (HBO Max)	**The Casagrandes (Nickelodeon)**; Club Mundo Kids (Universo and Televisa); Elena of Avalor (Disney Junior); Ghostwriter (Apple TV+); Sesame Street (HBO)
Best Actor – Television (Drama)	Best Actress – Television (Drama)
**JD Pardo – Mayans M.C. as Ezekiel "EZ" Reyes (FX)**; Manolo Cardona – Who Killed Sara? as Álex Guzmán (Netflix); Ricardo Chavira – Selena: The Series as Abraham Quintanilla (Netflix); Jay Hernandez – Magnum P.I. as Thomas Magnum (CBS); Enrique Murciano – Tell Me Your Secrets as Peter Guillory (Prime Video)	**Mj Rodriguez – Pose as Blanca Rodriguez-Evangelista (FX)**; Alice Braga – Queen of the South as Teresa Mendoza (USA Network); Salma Hayek – Bliss as Isabel Clemens (Prime Video); Anya Taylor Joy – The Queen's Gambit as Beth Harmon (Netflix); Monica Raymund – Hightown as Jackie Quiñones (Starz); Christian Serratos – Selena: The Series as Selena (Netflix)
Best Supporting Actor – Television (Drama)	Best Supporting Actress – Television (Drama)
**Colman Domingo – "Trouble Don't Last Always" as Ali Muhamand (HBO)**; Rubén Blades – Fear the Walking Dead as Daniel Salazar (AMC); Gabriel Chavarria – Selena: The Series as A. B. Quintanilla (Netflix); Raúl Esparza – Law & Order: Special Victims Unit as Rafael Barba (NBC); Ginés García – Who Killed Sara? as César Lazcano (Netflix); Edward James Olmos – Mayans M.C. as Felipe Reyes (FX); Eugenio Siller – Who Killed Sara? as José María "Chema" Lazcano (Netflix); Kevin Valdez – Little Voice as Louie King (Apple TV+)	**Morena Baccarin – The Twilight Zone as Michelle Weaver / Phineas Lowell (Paramount+)**; Sulem Calderon – Mayans M.C. as Gabriela "Gaby" Castillo (FX); Noemi Gonzalez – Selena: The Series as Suzette Quintanilla (Netflix); Paola Lázaro – The Walking Dead as Juanita Sanchez (AMC); Seidy López – Selena: The Series as Marcella Quintanilla (Netflix); Ofelia Medina – The Mosquito Coast as Lucrecia (Apple TV+); Eva Noblezada – Law & Order: Special Victims Unit as Zoey Carrera (NBC); Gina Torres – 9-1-1: Lone Star as Tommy Vega (Fox)
Best Actor – Television (Comedy)	Best Actress – Television (Comedy)
**Michael Cimino – Love, Victor as Victor Salazar (Hulu)**; Gabriel Iglesias – Mr. Iglesias as Gabe Iglesias (Netflix); Mario Lopez – Feliz NaviDAD as David (Lifetime); Xolo Maridueña – Cobra Kai as Miguel Diaz (Netflix)	**Barbie Ferreira – Unpregnant as Bailey Butler (HBO Max)**; Melissa Barrera – Vida as Lyn Hernandez (Starz); America Ferrera – Superstore as Amelia "Amy" Sosa (NBC); Mishel Prada – Vida as Emma Hernandez (Starz)
Best Supporting Actor – Television (Comedy)	Best Supporting Actress – Television (Comedy)
**Harvey Guillén – What We Do in the Shadows as Guillermo De la Cruz (FX)**; Ser Anzoategui – Vida as Edwina "Eddy" Martínez (Starz); Cristo Fernández – Ted Lasso as Dani Rojas (Apple TV+); Mario Lopez – Saved by the Bell as A.C. Slater (Peacock); James Martinez – Love, Victor as Armando Salazar (Hulu); Oscar Nunez – Mr. Iglesias as Carlos Hernandez (Netflix)	**Diana-Maria Riva – Dead to Me as Ana Perez (Netflix)**; Ana Ortiz – Love, Victor as Isabel Salazar (Hulu); Alycia Pascual-Peña – Saved by the Bell as Aisha Garcia (Peacock); Rosie Perez – The Flight Attendant as Megan Briscoe (HBO); Haley Sanchez – Genera+ion as Greta (HBO Max); Haskiri Velazquez – Saved by the Bell as Daisy Jiménez (Peacock)
Best Young Actor – Television	Best Voice-Over Actor – Television
**Madison Taylor Baez – Selena: The Series as Young Selena (Netflix)**; Raphael Alejandro – Bunk'd as Matteo Silva (Disney Channel); Edan Alexander – The Undoing as Miguel Alves (HBO); Isaac Arellanes – Ghostwriter as Ruben Reyna (Apple TV+); Paulina Chávez – Ashley Garcia: Genius in Love – Part 2 as Ashley Garcia (Netflix); Scarlett Estevez – Bunk'd as Gwen Flores (Disney Channel); Madison Reyes – Julie and the Phantoms as Julie Molina (Netflix); Isla Sunar – Two Sentence Horror Stories as Laura (The CW)	**Justina Machado – One Day at a Time – Animated Special as Penelope Alvarez (Pop TV)**; Izabella Alvarez – The Casagrandes as Ronnie Anne Santiago (Nickelodeon); Kevin Chacon – Santiago of the Seas as Santiago Montes (Nickelodeon); Rita Moreno – One Day at a Time – Animated Special as Lydia Riera (Pop TV); Sarah-Nicole Robles – The Owl House as Luz Noceda (Disney Channel); Michelle Zamora – Waffles and Mochi as Waffles (Netflix)
Best Director – Television
**Tanya Saracho – Vida (Starz)**; Norberto Barba – Law & Order: Special Victims Unit (NBC); Natalia Beristain – The Mosquito Coast (Apple TV+); Steven Canals – Pose (FX); Zetna Fuentes – The Nevers (HBO); Jon Huertas – This Is Us (NBC); Rania Attieh and Daniel Garcia – Two Sentence Horror Stories (The CW)

=== Additional Nominations ===
Best Documentary	Best Informational Program
**Mucho Mucho Amor: The Legend of Walter Mercado**; **POV: The Infiltrators (PBS)**; 187: The Rise of the Latino Vote (PBS); Amend: The Fight for America (Netflix); The Art of Political Murder (HBO); Asylum (ABC Documentaries); Immigration Nation (Netflix); Own the Room	**Street Food: Latin America (Netflix)**; ABC News: Nightline (ABC); Art in the Twenty-First Century (PBS); El Paso Strong (ESPN Deportes); National Geographic Presents IMPACT with Gal Gadot (National Geographic); Radar 2021: "The Case of the (Latin)X" (Telemundo); Radar 2021: "Why the Macho Man Has Got to Go" (Telemundo)
Best Short Film	Best Commercial Advertisement or Social Awareness Campaign
**UNLADYLIKE2020: Jovita Idar (PBS)**; If Cities Could Dance: Puerto Rico's Bomba, A Dance of The African Diaspora; Joyride (PBS); Manos de Oro; Princess Cut (HBO Max)	**Latinos Are Essential**; MDX "Working Mom"; Nuestras Voces Cuentan | Telemundo's 2020 Hispanic Heritage Month Campaign; Usa Tu Voz y Vota | Telemundo's 2020 GOTV Campaign; Walmart Quinceañera
Best Music Composition for Film or Television	Best Music Supervision for Film or Television
**Cristobal Tapia de Veer – The Third Day (HBO)**; Gustavo Farias – Onyx Equinox (Crunchyroll); Antônio Pinto – The Mosquito Coast (Apple TV+)	**Joe Rodríguez and Javier Nuño – I'm No Longer Here**; Lynn Fainchtein – Selena: The Series (Netflix); Brienne Rose and Michelle Johnson – Vida (Starz)
