= Carlos Miranda (actor) =

American actor (born 1984)

- Born: December 3, 1984 (age 41); San Francisco, California, U.S.
- Occupation: Actor
- Years active: 2007–present
- Children: 2

Carlos Miranda (born December 3, 1984) is an American actor. He is known for his roles as Theo Ruiz on Station 19 and Johnny Sanchez on Vida.

== Early life ==
Miranda was born in San Francisco, California. He is of Nicaraguan descent and speaks fluent Spanish. From the ages of 8-13, he lived in Miami before moving back to San Francisco.

== Career ==
After moving to Los Angeles in May 2008 to pursue an acting career, he landed his first feature film role that year in Gavin O'Connor's Warrior. He joined the cast of Sofia Coppola's The Bling Ring as Rob, which released in 2013.

Miranda worked a number of side jobs while auditioning for roles in Los Angeles, including driving for Uber. After he booked the indie film Senior Moment and a guest-star role on Chicago P.D., he auditioned for the series Vida via self-tape. Upon receiving the role of Johnny, he was able to work as an actor full-time. Miranda was a series regular on Vida for the show's 3 seasons from 2018 to 2020. The series tell the story of two Mexican American sisters who move back to their childhood home in Boyle Heights, Los Angeles after the death of their mother. In 2019, Vida received an award for Outstanding Television Series at the National Hispanic Media Coalition Impact Awards and an award for Outstanding Comedy Series at the GLAAD Media Award.

Miranda wrote, directed, produced, and featured in the short film "End Trip", released in 2019.

In 2020, Miranda appeared as a guest-star in season 4 of Station 19, as the firefighter Teodora "Theo" Ruiz. He was later promoted to the main cast for seasons 5-7. Teodora "Theo" Ruiz was a Lieutenant at Station 23 and Michael Williams' old captain and Travis' friend, who later is transferred to Station 19. He dates Vic in seasons 4-6. During his time on the show, Station 19 received a Tell-Tale TV Award for Favorite Network Drama Series.

Miranda was seen in a recurring role on the final season of Bosch and part of the main cast in the crime-action heist indie feature Righteous Thieves.

Miranda appears as Paz in The Boroughs, a 2026 American science fiction television series produced by The Duffer Brothers.

== Personal life ==
Miranda was inspired to pursue an acting career after watching Leonardo DiCaprio in the movie Romeo + Juliet when he was 11 years old. He has two sons.

== Filmography ==
Key
†	Denotes films that have not yet been released

=== Film ===
Year	Title	Role	Notes
2007	Slightly Super	Norm	Short film; as Robert Miranda
2007	Lacuna	Eric	Short film; as Robert Miranda
2008	The Wake	Beto	Short film
2009	Down for Life	Trigger	Uncredited
2011	The Lincoln Lawyer	Juror	Uncredited
2011	Warrior	Tito	Feature film debut
2013	The Bling Ring	Rob	
2014	White Dwarf	Carlos	
2015	Grandma	Young Man	
2015	The Human	Frank	
2016	Minority Effect	Warrior	Short film
2019	Lady Justice	Oliver	Short film
2019	End Trip	N/A	Credited as producer & writer; Short film
2021	Senior Moment	Pablo Torres	
2022	My Life Stopped at 15	Sean	Short film
2023	Righteous Thieves	Eddie	
2025	All There Is	Nathan	
2025	You Have Arrived	Luke Cruz	Short film
2026	Solidarity	Arean	
TBA	The Ditch †	TBA	In development

=== Television ===
Year	Title	Role	Notes
2014	Legit	Lt. Lopez	Episode: "Afghanistan"
2014	Dallas	Fernando	2 episodes
2016	How to Get Away with Murder	Jason Murray	Episode: "She Hates Us"
2017	Wisdom of the Crowd	Eddie Leyva	Episode: "User Bias"
2017	Chicago P.D.	Luis Vega	Episode: "Care Under Fire"
2018	Law & Order: Special Victims Unit	Miguel Lopez	2 episodes
2018–2020	Vida	Johnny Sanchez	Main cast; 18 episodes
2019	For the People	Nate Loomis	Episode: "Who Are We Now?"
2019	Empire	Santiago	Episode: "Heart of Stone"
2020	All Rise	Anthony Romero	Episode: "Bye Bye Bernie"
2020	Ana	Papasito	10 episodes
2020–2024	Station 19	Theo Ruiz	Recurring cast (season 4); Main cast (season 5–7)
2021	Bosch	Detective Chris Collins	5 episodes
2021–2022, 2024	Grey's Anatomy	Theo Ruiz	3 episodes
2026	The Boroughs	Paz Navarro	Main cast
2026	Chicago Fire	Jacob Morales	Episode: "New Blood"
