= Chelsea Rendon =

Mexican American actress (born 1993)

- Born: Chelsea Noreen Rendon; March 15, 1993 (age 33); Montebello, California, U.S
- Education: Montebello High School
- Occupation: Actress
- Years active: 2001–present
- Known for: Vida; Shameless

Chelsea Noreen Rendon (born March 15, 1993) is a Mexican-American actress. She is best known for portraying Mari Sanchez on Vida and Anne Gonzalez on Shameless.

== Early life and education ==
Chelsea Noreen Rendon was born on March 15, 1993, in Montebello, California. She was raised in Montebello by a single mother and began her acting career in 2001 at a young age, appearing in commercials before landing her first film role at age six. She graduated from Montebello High School.

== Career ==
Rendon began her acting career as a child, making her feature film debut as Cristina in the 2001 film No Turning Back. In her youth, she appeared in guest roles on several television series, including ER, The Shield, and Judging Amy.

In 2011, she played Ruthie Valdez in the Academy Award-nominated film A Better Life. This was followed by roles in McFarland, USA (2015) and the Netflix original film Bright (2017).

Rendon’s television work includes a recurring role as Lisa in the fifth season of The Fosters. From 2018 to 2020, she was a series regular on the Starz drama Vida, portraying the activist Mari. She also appeared as Anne Gonzalez in the tenth season of the Showtime series Shameless.

More recently, she starred in the 2024 caper comedy The Unexpecteds, and in 2021, she voiced the character Acat in the animated miniseries Maya and the Three.

== Filmography ==
=== Film ===
Year	Title	Role	Notes
2001	No Turning Back	Cristina Fernandez	
2005	Nine Lives	Sandra	
2011	A Better Life	Ruthie Valdez	
2015	McFarland, USA	Maria Marsala	
2017	Bright	Juvenita	
2018	Thriller	Tiffany Rodriguez	
2019	The Infiltrators	Viridiana	
2020	The Tax Collector	Lupe	
2024	The Unexpecteds	Pati	

=== Television ===
Year	Title	Role	Notes
2001	ER	Araceli	Episode: "Long Day's Journey"
2003	The Shield	Mayda Reyes	Episode: "The Quick Fix"
2004	Judging Amy	Lucy Navarro	Episode: ''Surrender''
2017	The Fosters	Lisa	3 episodes
2018–2020	Vida	Marisol "Mari" Sanchez	Main role
2019–2020	Shameless	Anne Gonzalez	6 episodes
2021	Lucifer	Camila	Episode: "Nothing Lasts Forever"
2021	Maya and the Three	Acat (voice)	Miniseries
2022	Maggie	Maria	Episode: "You Are the Master of Your Own Emotions"
2023	Lopez vs Lopez	Luna	Episode: "Lopez vs. Neighbors"
