= The Hot Chick =

2002 film by Tom Brady

- Theatrical release poster
- Directed by: Tom Brady
- Written by: Tom Brady; Rob Schneider
- Produced by: John Schneider; Carr D'Angelo
- Starring: Rob Schneider; Anna Faris; Matthew Lawrence; Eric Christian Olsen; Robert Davi; Michael O'Keefe
- Cinematography: Tim Suhrstedt
- Edited by: Peck Prior
- Music by: John Debney
- Production companies: Touchstone Pictures; Happy Madison Productions
- Distributed by: Buena Vista Pictures Distribution
- Release date: December 13, 2002
- Running time: 104 minutes
- Country: United States
- Language: English
- Budget: $34 million
- Box office: $54.6 million

The Hot Chick is a 2002 American fantasy comedy film directed by Tom Brady (in his feature length directorial debut), written by Brady and Rob Schneider, and starring Schneider, Anna Faris, Matthew Lawrence, Eric Christian Olsen, Robert Davi, and Michael O'Keefe, while introducing Rachel McAdams in her film debut. The film follows Jessica Spencer, a mean-spirited cheerleader who switches bodies with incompetent criminal Clive Maxtone. When Jessica discovers that the switch was caused by a pair of enchanted earrings she had stolen, she enlists the help of her friends to get the earrings back together before the switch becomes permanent.

Adam Sandler served as executive producer and made an uncredited cameo appearance as the Mambuza Bongo Player, a character based on one played by Schneider on Saturday Night Live. Principal photography began in March 2002 in Los Angeles and concluded in May.

The Hot Chick was theatrically released in the United States by Buena Vista Pictures Distribution on December 13, 2002, and grossed $54.6 million against a $34 million budget. It received generally negative reviews from critics.

== Plot ==
In 50 BC, in an Abyssinian castle, Princess Nawa uses a pair of enchanted earrings to escape an arranged marriage by swapping bodies with a slave girl. When each woman wears one of the earrings, their bodies are magically swapped while their minds remain in place.

In a modern-day suburban town in California, Jessica Spencer is the beautiful but mean-spirited "hot chick". Her closest friends are April, Keecia and Lulu. April is Jessica's best friend, and all four girls are cheerleaders. At school one day, Jessica pulls a prank on an overweight girl named Hildenburg by having her dress as a cheerleader from a rival school during a pep rally, and makes enemies with a Wiccan girl named Eden. After that, she and her friends visit the local mall, where Jessica uses her charm to get free gelato, gets her rival Bianca into trouble by planting merchandise on her to set her up for shoplifting, and finds the earrings in an African-themed store owned by Madame Mambuza. The earrings are not for sale, but Jessica steals them anyway.

Shortly afterward, small-time, 30-year-old criminal Clive Maxtone robs a nearby gas station. When Jessica and her friends stop and mistake him for an employee, he services their car to avoid raising suspicion. She accidentally drops one of the earrings on the ground, the girls drive away, and Clive picks up the earring. In their respective homes that evening, Jessica and Clive put on their earrings. When they wake up the next morning, each of them is trapped in the other's body. This is especially difficult for Jessica, who has a cheering competition and the senior prom coming up soon.

After Jessica convinces her friends of who she is, they help her investigate the body swap. Hildenburg, Eden, and Bianca are all innocent, Hildenburg and Eden join Jessica after she apologizes to them, and Eden finds a picture of the earrings on the internet. When the girls return to the African store, Madame Mambuza explains how the earrings work and tells the girls they must find the other earring soon or the change will become permanent at the next full moon. During this time, Jessica charms and other feminine skills were useless in the mall, and at the local club, Instant Tang, during which she gets in a fight with someone who flirts with Eden, and learns how to urinate while standing.

Meanwhile, Jessica is hired for two jobs while secretly living with April. At her own home, where she pretends to be a gay foreigner working as a gardener, her parents tell her about their marital problems and she helps them rekindle their sex life, while watching her younger brother, Booger, try on her clothes, much to her dismay. At school, while cleaning the boys' locker room as a custodian, she eavesdrops on her boyfriend Billy, who truly loves her unconditionally, and April's boyfriend Jake, who has been cheating on her. Faced with Jake's infidelity, April begins to fall in love with Jessica (although she's still stuck in Clive's body), who agrees to take her to the prom.

At the cheering competition, Jessica signals romantically to Billy while disguised as the school mascot, while Hildenburg is given her original spot on the cheerleading team, but when the head of her costume falls off, he becomes confused and leaves with Bianca. At home, Jessica tries on her prom dress, and breaks down, knowing it would not befit a male body. Booger soon realizes that Jessica is trapped in a male body and rekindles things with her. Jessica goes to the prom with April and they kiss. Jake sees this and is so upset and jealous, he accidentally spills his drink on his date. April confesses to being in love with Jessica, who tells April she is perfect and doesn't need anybody. Jessica tries to win Billy back who has taken Bianca to prom, telling Billy it's her in Clive's body, but he is shocked and confused as he runs off. The school faculty soon learn the "janitor", Clive, they hired was wanted and called the police.

During this time, Clive has been using Jessica's body to make money from men, including Billy, who gives him his money and car, believing he is Jessica. Clive then tries to run him over. On the evening of the prom, Hildenburg sees a video of Clive in Jessica's body robbing a man on the TV news, goes to the scene of the crime, and finds a business card for the strip club where Clive works as a pole dancer. She informs Jessica at the prom, and the girls go to the club. When they find Clive, Jessica steals his earring and puts it on herself along with the other one. With both earrings now on the same person, Jessica's and Clive's bodies return to their original owners. Jake, who left prom early, was present and assumed Jessica was working at the strip club, but fled after "Jessica" turned back into Clive.

After Jessica makes up with Billy and Clive is arrested only to escape, the film ends with the school's graduation ceremony, followed by a scene in which Clive, still running from the law and still dressed in lingerie and handcuffs, is picked up by a bartender from Instant Tang who believes, based on earlier events, that he is gay. The bartender turns around slowly with a sinister smile on his face to look at Clive and locks his car's doors. Clive screams in horror as the bartender drives away.

== Cast ==
- Rob Schneider as Clive Maxtone / Man Jessica Spencer, a middle-aged criminal who accidentally switches bodies with Jessica Spencer.
- Rachel McAdams as Jessica Spencer / Girl Clive Maxtone, a mean-spirited cheerleader who accidentally switches bodies with Clive Maxtone.
- Anna Faris as April, Jessica's best friend and fellow cheerleader.
- Matthew Lawrence as Billy, Jessica's boyfriend.
- Eric Christian Olsen as Jake, April's unfaithful boyfriend and Billy's best friend.
- Robert Davi as Stan, April's father.
- Melora Hardin as Carol Spencer, Jessica's mother.
- Michael O'Keefe as Richard Spencer, Jessica's father.
- Angie Stone as Madame Mambuza, a woman who owns an African store at the mall where the magic earrings are held.
- Matt Weinberg as Booger Spencer, Jessica's younger brother who likes to mess with Jessica's stuff.
- Alexandra Holden as Lulu, Jessica's redheaded friend and fellow cheerleader.
- Maritza Murray as Keecia "Ling-Ling" Jackson, Jessica's African-Korean-Jewish-American friend and fellow cheerleader.
- Tia Mowry as Venetia, Sissie's identical twin sister and Keecia's friend.
- Tamera Mowry as Sissie, Venetia's identical twin sister and Keecia's friend.
- Michelle Branch as an Instant Tang DJ
- Jodi Long as Mrs. Jackson, Keecia's Korean mother.
- Lee Garlington as Vice Principal Marjorie Bernard, the vice principal of Bridgetown High School.
- Leila Kenzle as Julie, April's mother.
- Fay Hauser as Mrs. Thomas
- Sam Doumit as Eden, a goth girl who Jessica bullies and later befriends.
- Megan Kuhlmann as Hildenburg, an overweight smart girl who Jessica pranks and later befriends, while making her a full-time cheerleader.
- Maria-Elena Laas as Bianca, a cheerleader from a rival high school and Jessica's arch nemesis.
- Ashlee Simpson as Monique, Bianca's best friend.
- Jenna Dewan as Bianca Salsa Girl
- Dick Gregory as an Instant Tang bathroom attendant
- Scott Dolezal as an Instant Tang bartender who thinks Jessica in Clive's body is gay.
- Shazia Ali as Princess Nawa, an Abyssinian princess who switches bodies with a slave girl to escape an arranged marriage.
- Vivian Corado as a slave girl who switches bodies with Princess Nawa
- Ozman Sirgood as The King
- Louis Lombardi as Pole Cat patron
- Bob Rubin as Pole Cat bouncer
- Wiley Roberts as Mr. Jackson, Keecia's half-African one-quarter-Jewish father.
- Adam Sandler as Mambuza Bongo Guy (uncredited)
Additionally, Will Sasso appears in a deleted scene as school janitor Mr. Garbrgian.

=== Cameos ===
Wes Takahashi, former animator and visual effects supervisor for Industrial Light & Magic, makes a cameo appearance as a news reporter. Schneider's mother Pilar and Brady's wife Lisa both appear as judges of the cheerleading competition.

== Production ==
Filming took place at El Segundo High School in El Segundo, Redondo Union High School in Redondo Beach, and University High School in Los Angeles. Speaking on the film, Rob Schneider commented: "No man is a hundred-percent masculine and no woman is a hundred-percent feminine – we're all just somewhere on the scale there. So what I tried to do was just play it with an innocence and gentleness, and then find some physical keys to lock-in on."

== Soundtrack ==
No.	Title	Recording artist(s)	Length
1.	"Starlight"	Zed	2:52
2.	"Mess"	Custom	2:42
3.	"Take Tomorrow (One Day at a Time)"	Butch Walker	4:31
4.	"Mongoose"	Fu Manchu	4:12
5.	"Firecracker"	Roxy Saint	2:54
6.	"Ash to Ash"	Loudermilk	4:30
7.	"You're Pretty Good Looking"	Whirlwind Heat	1:55
8.	"I See You Baby" (Fatboy Slim remix)	Groove Armada featuring Gram'ma Funk	5:45
9.	"Stick 'Em"	Liquid Todd & Dr. Luke	3:32
10.	"Get Into Something"	Jené	3:48
11.	"Do Whatcha Wanna Do"	Len	3:25
12.	"That's What Girls Do"	No Secrets	3:09
Total length:			43:16

== Release ==
The Hot Chick was originally rated R, but several scenes were edited out to receive the broader PG-13 rating.

== Reception ==
=== Box office ===
The film opened at #5 at the U.S. box office on the weekend of December 13–15, 2002, taking in US$7,401,146, averaging $3,338 across the 2,217 theatres where it was shown. It went on to earn a total worldwide gross of $54,639,553.

=== Critical response ===
The Hot Chick received generally negative reviews by critics. On Rotten Tomatoes, the film had an approval rating of 21% based on reviews from 80 critics, with an average score of 3.90/10. The critical consensus read: "The Hot Chick's one-note concept gets stretched thin, and a lot of the jokes fall flat." On Metacritic, as of October 2020, the film had a score of 29 out 100 based on reviews from 22 critics, indicating "generally unfavorable reviews". Audiences surveyed by CinemaScore gave the film a grade B+ on scale of A to F.

Roger Ebert and Richard Roeper gave the film two thumbs way down. Ebert gave the film half a star (out of a possible four), declaring, "The MPAA rates this PG-13. It is too vulgar for anyone under 13 and too dumb for anyone over 13." Roeper further criticized: "it's in color. And, it was mostly in focus... I really can't say any more for it beyond that." Dennis Harvey of Variety magazine wrote: "At best routinely assembled—at worst barely competent. The slapstick is labored, and the bigger setpieces flat."

=== Accolades ===
Rob Schneider was nominated for a Razzie Award for Worst Actor of the Decade for his performance in the film.

== Home media ==
The Hot Chick was released on VHS and DVD on May 13, 2003 by Buena Vista Home Entertainment (under the Touchstone Home Entertainment label). The DVD featured the deleted scenes that would have given the film an R rating, including an alternate ending.

== See also ==
- Freaky (2020)
- Freaky Friday (1976)
- Big (1988)
- Body swaps in films
