= Stone Cold Fox =

- Theatrical release poster
- Directed by: Sophie Tabet
- Written by: Sophie Tabet; Julia Roth
- Produced by: Stephen Braun; Eric B. Fleischman; Chris Abernathy; Jonathan Craven; Sophie Tabet; Julia Roth
- Starring: Kiernan Shipka; Krysten Ritter; Kiefer Sutherland; Jamie Chung; Mishel Prada; Karen Fukuhara
- Cinematography: Ken Seng
- Edited by: Joel Griffen; Jennifer Lee
- Music by: Alex Kovacs
- Production companies: Bee-Hive; The Wonder Company
- Distributed by: Vertical
- Release date: November 7, 2025
- Running time: 86 minutes
- Country: United States
- Language: English

Stone Cold Fox is a 2025 American action thriller film directed and co-written by Sophie Tabet.

The film was released on November 7, 2025.

== Plot ==
Fox is a young girl growing up with her sister Spooky. Their dad got into an accident and mom was doing alcohol and drugs, hence Fox decides to leave her home. After a while of living on the street, Fox meets a drug dealer Goldie and becomes her partner. One day, while at a bar, Fox apparently sees Spooky dancing and shouts out her name, but is forced to leave the club.

Goldie occasionally bribes a cop, Billy, to conceal her involvement with drugs. One day, while on patrol, Billy stops a car and opens its trunk, seeing it filled with drugs. He shoots the driver dead and steals the drugs. When the other cops question Billy, he claims the driver of the car tried to attack him - the cops find the car trunk to be mostly empty, with only a small amount of cocaine in it.

Billy gives the bag with the stolen drugs to Goldie, who has it buried in a safe place, but Fox takes the bag of drugs thinking it to be cash. Later realizing that the bag contains drugs, she stashes it in a locker. Goldie doesn't see Fox at their hideout, and checks on the buried bag, only to find it missing. She contacts Billy, who puts out a missing person report on Fox.

Fox appears to see Spooky being kidnapped in a van and tries to follow her, but is hit by another car. She wakes up in the home of Lebanese immigrants Frankie and Dylan, and reveals to them that she has to save her sister. Frankie shows Fox her collection of weapons, including Nunchaku and Shuriken, and they all decide to raid Goldie's hideout to rescue Spooky.

Police officer Corbett investigates the report of a woman hit by a car, which eventually leads her to Frankie. At the police station, Corbett sees a locked drawer and upon opening it, finds a file folder filled with information on several missing girls, including Fox. Billy sees the empty drawer and understands that Corbett has taken the file on the missing girls. Goldie breaks up with Billy since she has no further use for him.

Fox, Frankie and Dylan sneak up to Goldie's hideout to free Spooky. While Dylan is talking to the guards, Fox and Frankie attempt to leave with the girls. A fight ensues, and Goldie holds a gun to a girl's head while Fox calls her "Spooky". Goldie then reminds Fox that the day Fox left her home, Spooky had fallen in the bathroom of their home and hit her head, instantly killing her. Over the course of time, Fox had repressed the memory and falsely imagined that Spooky was still alive. Fox then overpowers Goldie and kills her, but Billy arrives and grabs the key to the locker from Fox. Corbett too turns up on the scene, arresting Billy and handing Fox the key to the locker.

Six months later, a new bar and rolleskating rink called "Spooky's" opens up, with Fox as its manager.

== Cast ==
- Kiernan Shipka as Fox
- Krysten Ritter as Goldie
- Kiefer Sutherland as Sergeant Billy Breaker
- Lorenza Izzo as Camila
- Jamie Chung as Officer Corbett
- Karen Fukuhara as Minx
- Mishel Prada as Frankie
- Adam Elshar as Dylan
- Farah Bsieso as Youmna
- Bluesy Burke as Spooky
- Spenser Granese as Ricky
- Gabrielle Maiden as Crystal

== Production ==
It was announced in May 2024 that Kiernan Shipka, Krysten Ritter and Kiefer Sutherland were set to star in the film, with Sophie Tabet directing and co-writing the screenplay. Lorenza Izzo, Jamie Chung and Karen Fukuhara were also set as part of the cast. Filming began in June in Los Angeles, with Mishel Prada added to the cast.

== Release ==
In September 2025, Vertical acquired U.S. distribution rights to the film, and released it on November 7, 2025.
