= The Boroughs =

American sci-fi television series

- Genre: Science fiction
- Created by: Jeffrey Addiss; Will Matthews
- Starring: Alfred Molina; Alfre Woodard; Denis O'Hare; Clarke Peters; Carlos Miranda; Jena Malone; Seth Numrich; Alice Kremelberg; Geena Davis
- Music by: John Paesano
- Country of origin: United States
- Original language: English
- No. of seasons: 1
- No. of episodes: 8

Production
- Executive producers: Ben Taylor; Hilary Leavitt; The Duffer Brothers; Jeffrey Addiss; Will Matthews
- Producers: Jamie Vega Wheeler; Joe Lotito
- Cinematography: Matthew Jensen; Michelle Lawler
- Editors: Noëmi Preiswerk; Jonathan Alberts; Cindy Mollo; Christopher Nelson; Misha Syeed
- Running time: 40–55 minutes
- Production companies: Off Franklin Productions; Upside Down Pictures

Original release
- Network: Netflix
- Release: May 21, 2026

The Boroughs is an American science fiction television series created by Jeffrey Addiss and Will Matthews and executive produced by The Duffer Brothers.

The series premiered on Netflix on May 21, 2026. In June 2026, the series was canceled after one season.

== Premise ==
Set in an idyllic New Mexico desert retreat, The Boroughs follows the residents of a luxury retirement community overseen by an unnervingly upbeat corporate staff. Their peaceful lives are shattered after they uncover a dark conspiracy involving a subterranean supernatural entity and a youth-stealing alien.

In a seemingly picturesque retirement community, a group of unlikely heroes must band together to stop an otherworldly threat from stealing the one thing they don't have… time.

— Netflix description of the series

== Cast and characters ==
=== Main ===
- Alfred Molina as Sam, a recently widowed and retired aeronautical engineer who reluctantly moves into a retirement community known as The Boroughs
- Alfre Woodard as Judy, a retired journalist and a resident at the retirement community
- Denis O'Hare as Wally, a retired doctor who is dying of cancer and a resident at the retirement community
- Clarke Peters as Art, Judy's husband who lives with her at the retirement community
- Carlos Miranda as Paz, a security guard at the retirement community
- Jena Malone as Claire, Sam's daughter.
- Seth Numrich as Blaine, the CEO of The Boroughs
- Alice Kremelberg as Anneliese, Blaine's wife
- Geena Davis as Renee, a retired music manager and a resident at the retirement community

=== Recurring ===
- Beth Bailey as Kayleigh, the transition manager at the retirement community
- Ed Begley Jr. as Edward, Grace's husband who is in The Manor, the community's long-term care facility
- Rafael Casal as Neil, Claire's husband and Sam's son-in-law
- Nancy Daly as Mother, an ancient extraterrestrial creature
- Anna Deavere Smith as Gigi, a resident at The Manor.
- Eric Edelstein as Hank Williams, the head of security at the retirement community
- Jane Kaczmarek as Lilly, Sam's recently deceased wife
- Mousa Hussein Kraish as Dr. Mansour
- Mary McDonnell as Duchess, an oracle living in The Manor
- Bill Pullman as Jack Willard, a resident at the retirement community
- Karan Soni as Toby
- Dee Wallace as Grace, a resident of the retirement community

== Episodes ==
No.	Title	Directed by	Written by	Original release date
1	"Welcome to the Boroughs"	Ben Taylor	Jeffrey Addiss & Will Matthews	May 21, 2026
One quiet night in The Boroughs retirement community, Grace, a resident, is attacked by a strange, eldritch creature. Some time later, recently widowed and still grieving, Sam Cooper reluctantly moves into now deceased Grace's former home. Sam is regularly haunted by dreams and visions of his late wife, Lilly. After meeting his neighbour Jack, Sam visits the community's corporate owners to try to break his contract and move out. Back at his house he finds Grace's husband Edward searching for the "owl in the walls". Edward, suffering from dementia, attacks and injures Sam, believing he is "one of them". Edward is returned by staff to The Manor, a special facility for residents with dementia. Hank, head of security, takes Sam to The Manor to meet Blaine Shaw, the young CEO of The Boroughs, where Shaw persuades Sam to spend time in The Boroughs before breaking his contract. That evening, Jack throws a barbecue for Sam, with fellow residents Wally, Judy and husband Art, and Renee. After the barbecue, Sam returns to his house and calls Shaw to tell him he has decided to stay. Later, disturbed by alarms, he enters Jack's house where he finds the creature over Jack's body.
2	"The Mourning After"	Ben Taylor	Jose Molina	May 21, 2026
The next day, Sam reports the creature to the paramedics who collect Jack's corpse, but they instead blame heart failure. Renee reports the theft of quartz items across the community to junior security guard Paz, but his superior, Hank, shuts down further inquiries. Paz and Renee discreetly investigate anyway. At the Manor, Sam visits Edward, who claims he "caught one", and that "The Owl is in the walls. The key is in the light". Sam searches his house and finds Edward's key, with a storage locker number, in a light fixture. Art visits an isolated shack where he grows magic mushrooms, and mourns Jack's death, but also acknowledges that Jack and Judy were having an affair. There he witnesses a large flock of crows all suddenly kill themselves by dashing themselves against the ground. Sam searches Edward's storage locker, but only uncovers an actual stuffed owl, so returns home, where he finds something extraordinary. While a memorial is held for Jack in the local Mexican restaurant, Sam shows his discovery to Wally: "The blood of the creature that killed Jack", which when exposed to light from an old TV, explodes in an extraordinary display of energy. Wally declares it "a miracle".
3	"A Pyramid"	Augustine Frizzell	Julie Siege	May 21, 2026
After Jack's memorial, Judy notices the light in Sam's house, and peeking in sees Wally and Sam clear away the mysterious material. In the following days she grows suspicious. Later, cameras Renee and Paz installed in the community centre detect motion, so the two investigate. Wally and Sam break into the funeral home to perform an illicit autopsy on Jack's body. They are discovered by Judy. Wally’s examination reveals punctures in Jack’s throat leading to his brain. Back at Renee’s, the community centre footage hides whatever triggered the cameras. Paz and Renee become intimate. Hank enters the community centre to investigate the break in, seeming to know what had transpired, but leaves for the funeral home when a passer-by notices the intruders. Art explores the site of the crows’ mass-suicide, and finds an old mine, injuring his hand opening a door. Wally examines Judy’s and Sam’s throats, finding wounds like Jack’s. Hank arrives, so Sam gives himself up, as Judy and Wally escape. At Renee’s house, a creature emerges from the oven to feed on the sleeping Renee, ignoring Paz. Deep in a cave, Art finds a peach tree whose fruit miraculously heals his hand.
4	"Forbidden Fruit"	Augustine Frizzell	Keith Sweet II	May 21, 2026
Art, having eaten the peach that healed his hand, is rejuvenated. At the company offices, Shaw informs Sam that Edward has died, seeming to threaten Sam before releasing him. Wally theorises the creature drinks sleeping residents’ cerebrospinal fluid, causing early deaths. Using fluid extracted from Sam, they plan to trap the creature. Sam and Judy visit his daughter Claire’s home to collect more old TVs from Sam’s collection, to use against the creature, though Sam argues with Claire. Renee watches hidden camera footage of Hank and, using a reverse image search, discovers he is actually long dead prison warden Milton Hauser. She visits Hauser's son, in whose photo album she finds a decades old picture of Shaw and Hank at the age they appear now. In a bar, Art meets Shaw’s wife Anneliese. They're discussing Jack and Judy’s affair, when Art collapses and re-ages. Hank shouts abuse at bickering residents, so Shaw orders him "to the basement". Paz later follows Hank to the basement room, but when he opens the door, Hank knocks him out. At Sam’s house, Sam and Wally lure the creature, but Sam’s bank of TVs fails. Judy shoots and injures it, but it escapes via a trapdoor hidden in Sam’s oven.
5	"Another Beautiful Day"	Kyle Patrick Alvarez	Tom Hanada	May 21, 2026
Sam, Judy and Wally explore tunnels under the community, and following a blood trail, find the dying creature. Judy mercy kills it. Sam notices its scarred face, unlike the creature that killed Jack. They flee as more creatures approach. Hank, holding Paz hostage, unlocks his phone, and learns Renee uncovered his identity. He kidnaps Renee, taking her and Paz to the desert to kill them. However, in a fight, they escape, and Hank accidentally drives the car over a cliff. Shaw meets Claire at The Manor to persuade her to have Sam committed there. Art returns to the cave, but the tree is dying and Anneliese is there. She hints to being older than she looks, and wants Art's secret of rejuvenation. Art shows her the pit from the peach, she eats it, and transforms monstrously. Judy, Sam and Wally find Anneliese attacking Art. Judy shoots her, but Anneliese escapes. Driving back, Wally, Sam, Judy and Art encounter Paz and Renee. They speculate that Shaw, Anneliese and Hank use creatures’ blood to stay eternally youthful, while the creatures feed on residents. Anneliese finds Hank’s body. Back at The Boroughs, Shaw rejuvenates the injured Anneliese, then tracks down the team.
6	"The Grey Rebellion"	Kyle Patrick Alvarez	James Schamus	May 21, 2026
The team are brought to The Manor, where Wally, on Shaw’s behalf offers them a deal for their silence. They apparently accept, returning to more restricted lives, closely surveilled by the security team. Wally takes a role at The Boroughs’ research lab, where the Shaws compel him to take the rejuvenation fluid and introduce him to “Mother”, a creature whose blood imparts eternal youth. Shaw, actually a centenarian miner who discovered Mother, now posing as his own grandson, founded The Boroughs to supply Mother and her offspring with a steady supply of spinal fluid. Wally believes he can undermine the Shaws’ selfish goals and use their discovery for good. Art becomes despondent, but Paz, Renee and Judy plot to use the community’s 75th anniversary celebrations as cover to escape, though Renee instead suggests killing Mother. Sam circumvents his ankle tag and escapes across the desert, to meet Claire. However Claire, convinced by Shaw of Sam’s mental deterioration, delivers him to The Manor. Sam's capture galvanises Art, Judy and Renee into action to bring the Shaws and The Boroughs down, as Wally witnesses one of the creatures bring the spinal fluid to the lab, where it is injected into Mother.
7	"Time to Go"	Augustine Frizzell	Yona Speidel	May 21, 2026
On the day of The Boroughs’ 75th anniversary celebrations, Wally works with Dr. Mansour on improving Mother's blood, which is losing its restorative power. Wally’s experiments suggest a transfusion from her offspring, but Dr Mansour insists on months of tests to do the procedure safely. Claire is clearing Sam's house, including his bank of TVs, when she's interrupted by Kayleigh, the transition manager. Claire switches on all Sam's TVs which causes Kayleigh to levitate and temporarily degenerate before Claire’s eyes. Sam attempts to escape from The Manor by seeking advice from fellow inmate The Duchess. She tells him his visions of his wife are actually psychic manifestations of Mother, who wants Sam to save her. Judy and Renee break into The Manor to rescue Sam, while Art causes a distraction, and Paz covers the lobby just as Claire arrives to have Sam released. Shaw murders Dr Mansour, and demands Wally begin the transfusions immediately despite the danger. Renee and Judy find Sam, and break out of the Manor, meeting Paz and Claire, who reconciles with Sam. They all escape in a laundry truck Art commandeers. Sam declares they won’t kill Mother, they’ll save her. Wally rescues Mother from the lab.
8	"Triple Audible"	Augustine Frizzell	Jeffrey Addiss & Will Matthews	May 21, 2026
The 75th anniversary celebrations continue, The team shelters at the community centre, where Wally brings Mother. Mother psychically tells Sam she wishes to die. Some of the team take her through the tunnels, heading to the cave. Art and Judy stay behind to stall the Shaws who arrive soon after. In the tunnels, Paz and Renee split off to free Mother’s offspring, while Sam, Wally and Claire take Mother to the cave. Anneliese tortures Judy, ignoring Art's attempt to give her the information she seeks about Mother's location; one of her minions discovers proof they've gone down into the tunnels. Paz and Renee reach the basement where they find Hank, disfigured but alive, and resentful enough of Shaw to help them release Mother’s offspring. Prevented from reaching the mines by security barriers, Claire, Sam and Wally bring Mother to Sam’s house. The Shaws find them there, but Claire and Sam power up the bank of TVs, disintegrating Anneliese and incapacitating Shaw. Judy is dying of her injuries, but Mother uses her powers to heal her. Sam takes Mother back to the cave and the tree, but is brutally ambushed by a revived Shaw. Mother is joined by her offspring, and creates an energy blast that kills herself and Shaw. Sam seemingly survives and later celebrates with his family and friends.

== Production ==
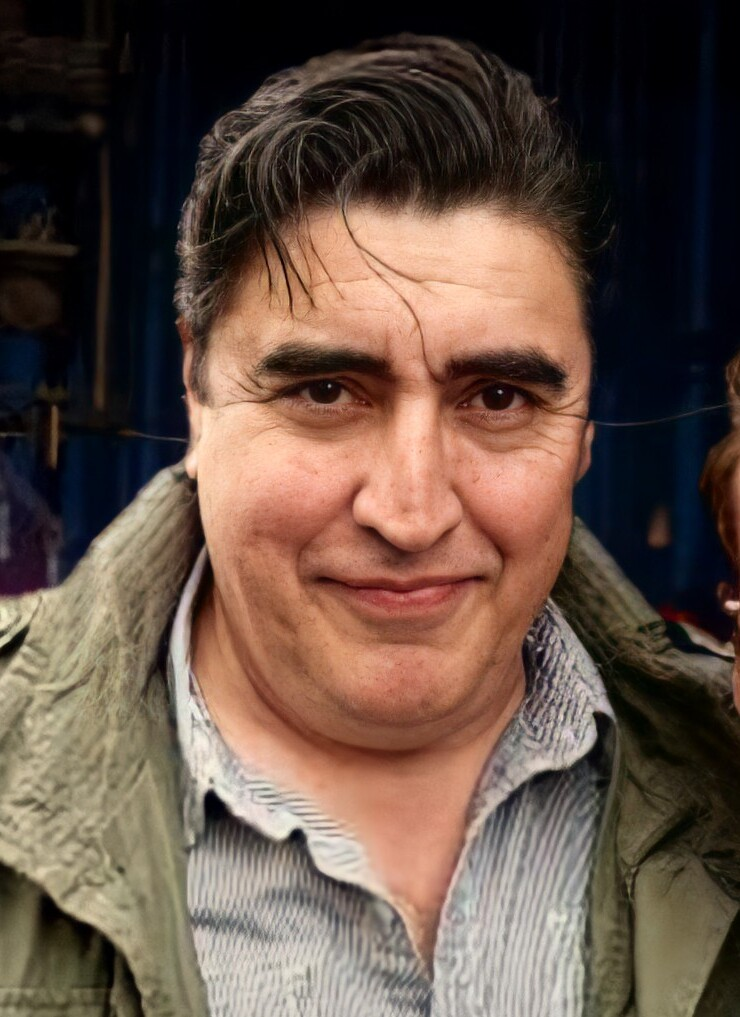
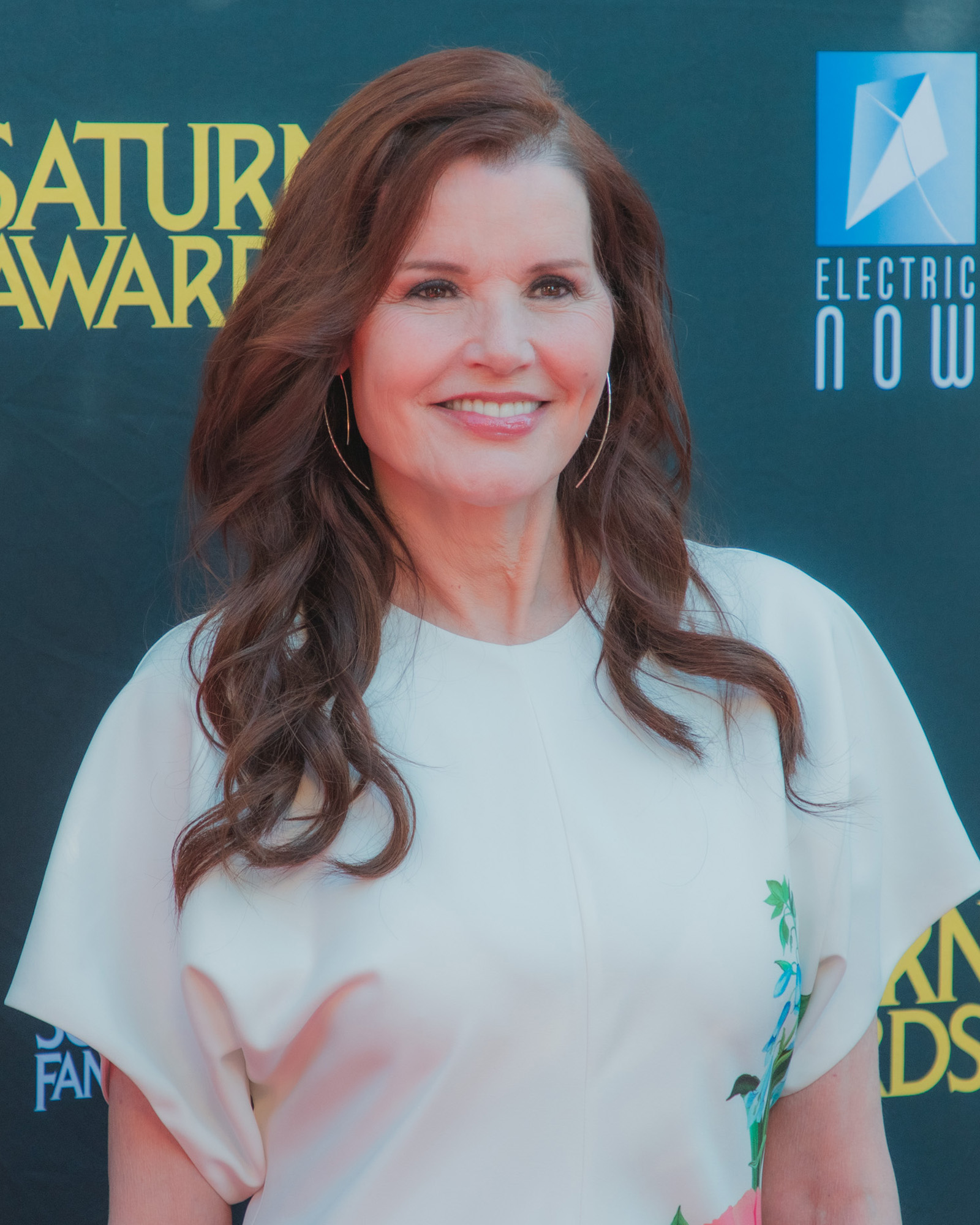
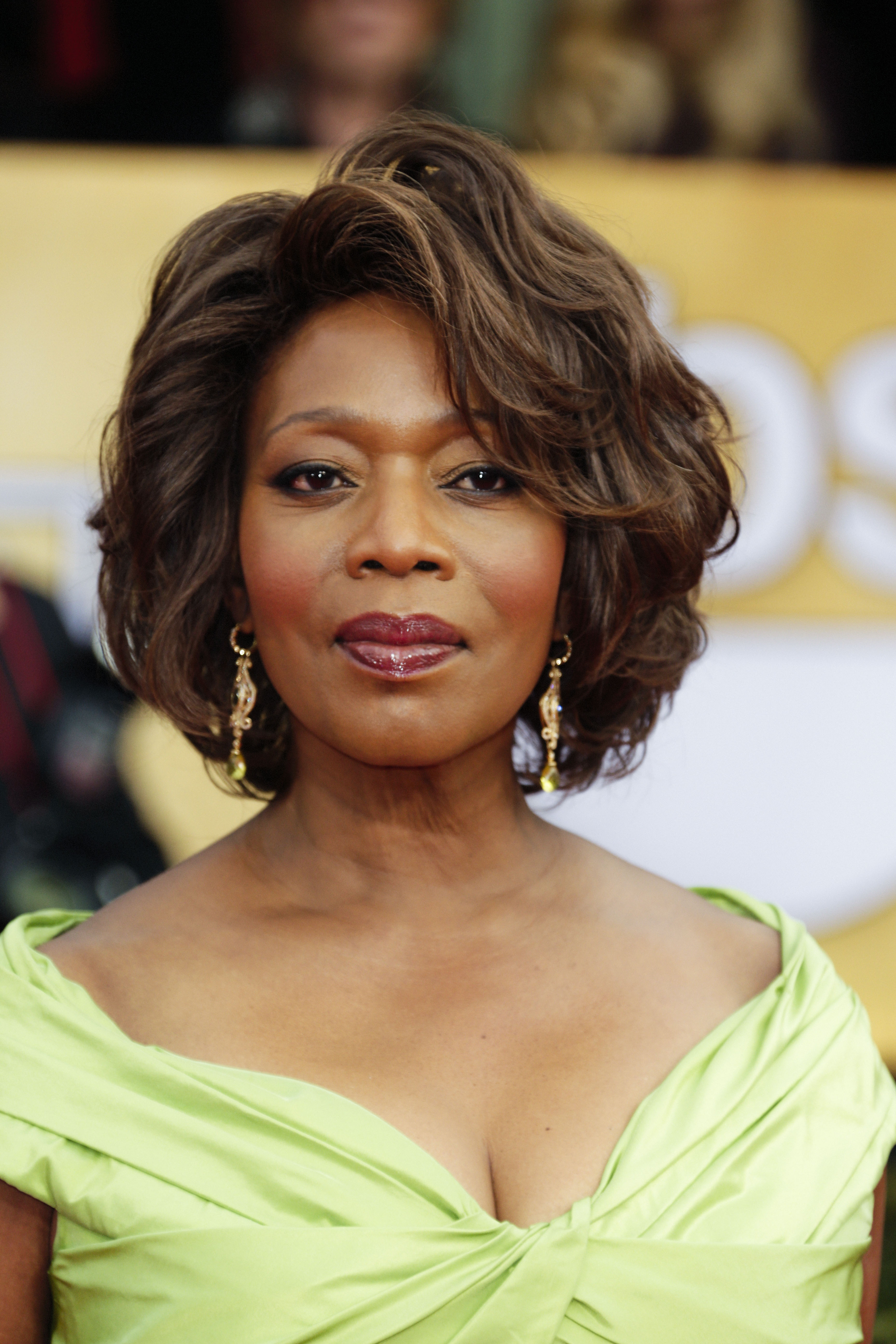
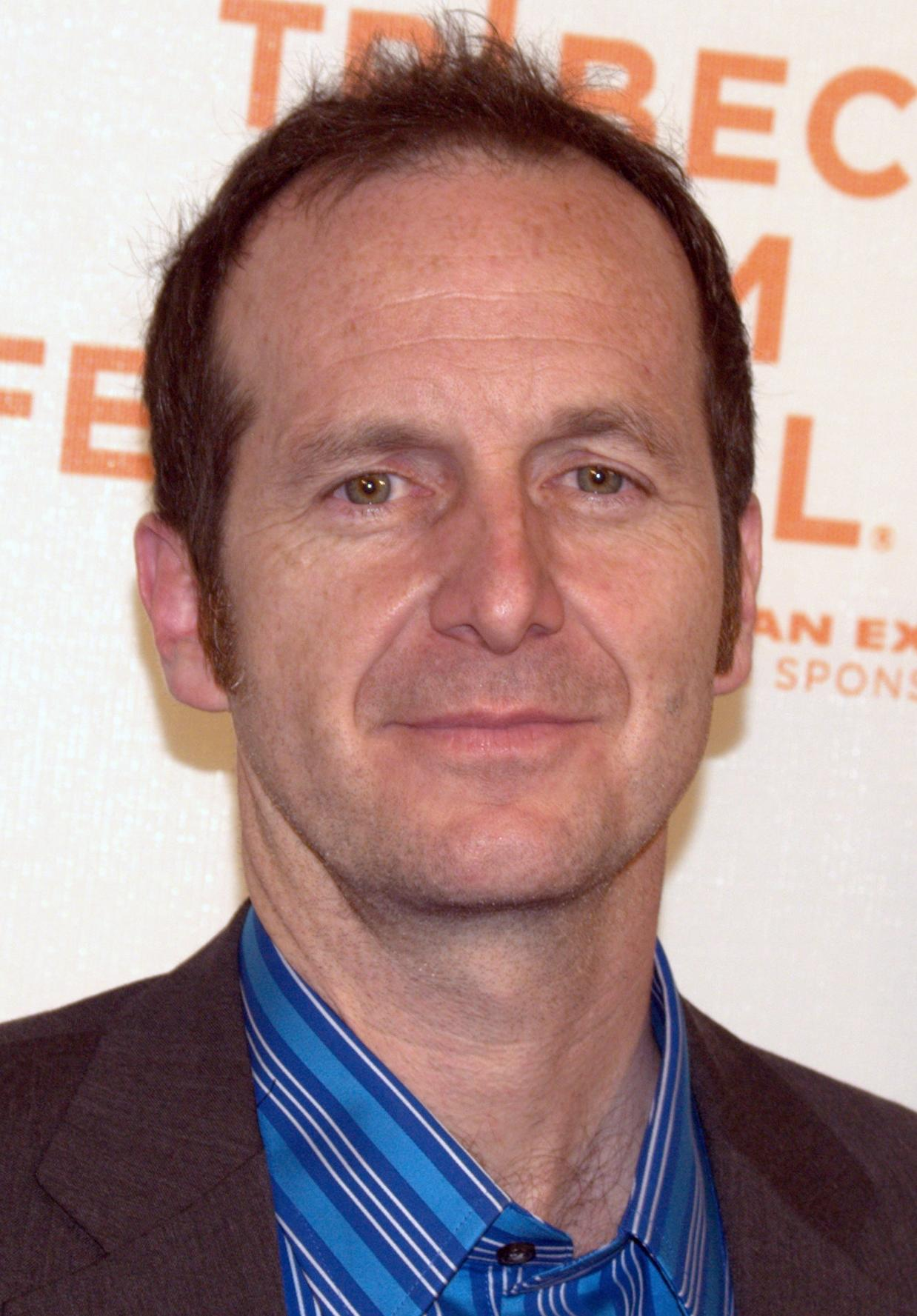
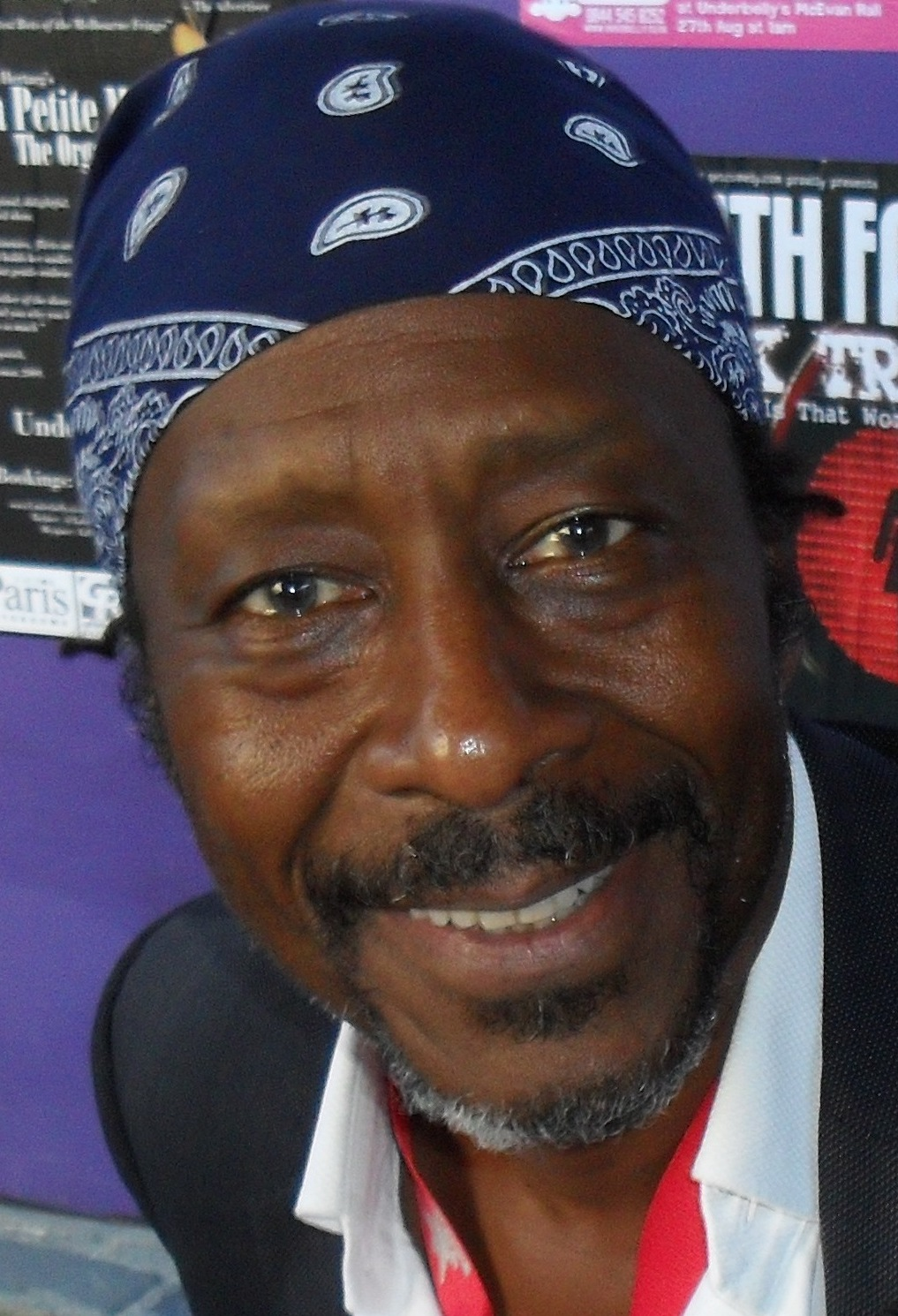
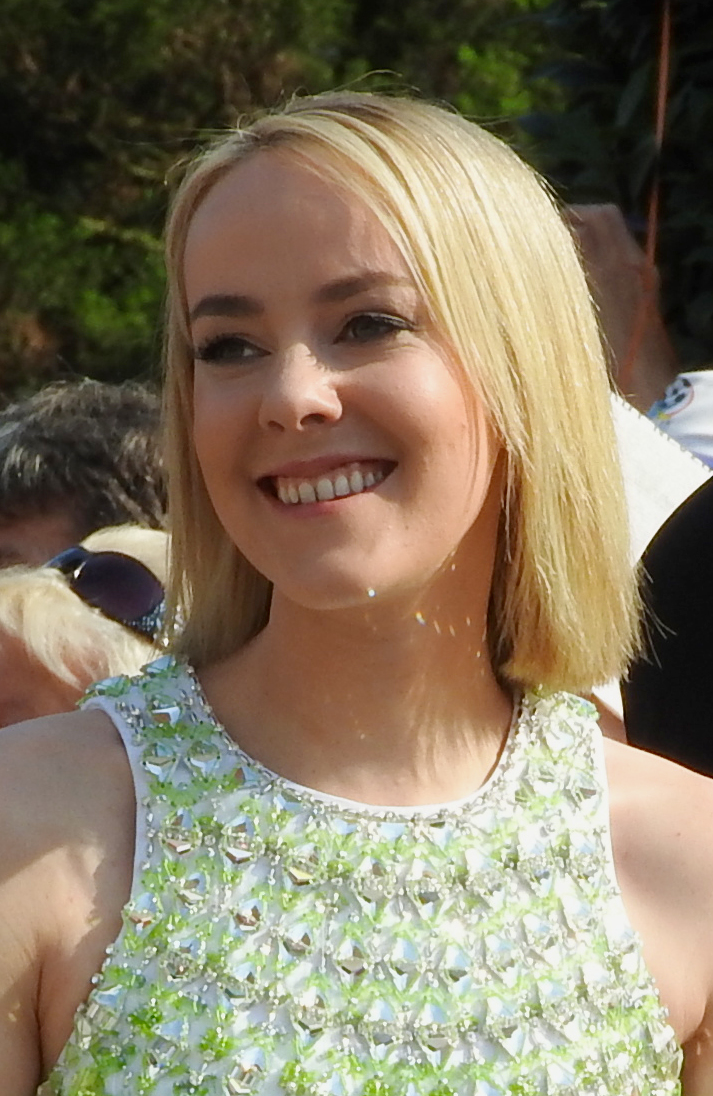
The series stars Alfred Molina, Geena Davis, Alfre Woodard, Denis O'Hare, Clarke Peters, and Jena Malone
(pictured left to right, top to bottom)

=== Development ===
The eight-part series received a series order from Netflix in April 2023. Jeffrey Addiss and Will Matthews created the show and are the showrunners. Ben Taylor directed multiple episodes and served as an executive producer, alongside The Duffer Brothers, Addiss & Matthews and Hilary Leavitt on behalf of Upside Down Pictures under the company's overall deal with Netflix.

On June 17, 2026, Netflix canceled the series after one season.

=== Casting ===
Bill Pullman, Geena Davis, Clarke Peters, Alfred Molina, Denis O'Hare, and Alfre Woodard were cast in September 2024. Later that month, Jena Malone, Carlos Miranda, Seth Numrich and Alice Kremelberg joined the cast. In November 2024, Rafael Casal, Ed Begley Jr., Jane Kaczmarek, Eric Edelstein, Dee Wallace and Mousa Hussein Kraish joined the cast in recurring roles.

=== Filming ===
Filming began in September 2024. Filming locations include Albuquerque and Santa Fe, New Mexico.

== Release ==
The series premiered on Netflix on May 21, 2026.. In its first week, according to figures reported in Deadline Hollywood, the drew in "5.6m views", debuting in second place on Netflix's TV series chart behind Nemesis, then in its second week of release. Collider reported that this accounted for 35 million hours viewed.

== Reception ==
On the review aggregator website Rotten Tomatoes, the series holds an approval rating of 97%, based on 69 reviews, with an average of rated reviews of 7.3/10. The website's critics consensus reads, "The Boroughs exudes excellence through its wonderfully plotted sci-fi trappings, star-studded cast, heartfelt narrative, and genuine ingenuity; a new classic through-and-through." Metacritic, which uses a weighted average, assigned a score of 71 out of 100 based on 28 critics, indicating "generally favorable" reviews.

== Soundtrack ==
The Boroughs (Soundtrack from the Netflix Series) was released on June 19, 2026.
