= Maria-Elena Laas =

American actress of Puerto Rican descent

- Born: November 28, 1983 (age 42); Ponce, Puerto Rico
- Occupation: Actress
- Years active: 1999–present

Maria-Elena Laas (born November 28, 1983) is a Puerto Rican–born American actress. She is best known for her role as Cruz in the comedy-drama television series Vida.

== Early life ==
Maria-Elena Laas was born in Ponce, Puerto Rico and raised in Saudi Arabia and Japan.

== Career ==
Laas started her modeling career at the age of 13. She has appeared in over 90 international commercials and advertising campaigns, including Garnier, Mango, Miller Lite, Carlsberg, Coors Lite, Budweiser, Ford, and Target. In 2006, she appeared in an advertising campaign for coffee brand Nespresso, opposite actor George Clooney.

Her first on-screen appearance was a role as Marisa Rios in the episode "Silicone Valley of the Dolls" of the crime drama television series Pacific Blue. In 2002, she portrayed Svetlana in sitcom Grounded for Life. Laas' film credits include the comedy film The Hot Chick (2002) and independent films Suffering Man's Charity (2007), Airplane Disasters (2007), Lunatics, Lovers and Poets (2009) and Kill the Habit (2010). In 2018, Laas landed the role of Cruz in the drama television series Vida. The series centers around the Mexican American community in Los Angeles.

In 2020, she had a main role as Rosalita Vega on Cinemax's action television series Warrior. In the second season of Warrior, Rosalita Vega appeared in five episodes.

== Personal life ==
She currently resides in Southern California.

== Filmography ==
=== Film ===
Year	Title	Role	Notes
2000	This Guy Is Falling	Laura	Short film
2002	The Hot Chick	Bianca	
2006	Airplane Disasters	Elena	
2007	Suffering Man's Charity	Liliana	
2009	Burka Girls Gone Wild	Burka Girl #2	
2010	Kill the Habit	Cardamosa	
2010	Pastor Shepherd	Annamarie-ah Harrison	
2010	Lunatics, Lovers & Poets	Maria Easton	
2011	Sold	Alexa	Short film
2011	The Killing of Leonard Riley	Christina	
2011	Loverly	Girlfriend	Short film
2012	Swerve	Maria	
2012	Unknowns	Detective Rios	
2013	To the Bone	Inspector	Short film
2014	American Weapon	Maria	

=== Television ===
Year	Title	Role	Notes
1999	Pacific Blue	Marisa Rios	Episode: "Silicone Valley of the Dolls"
2002	Grounded for Life	Svetlana	Episode: "Cat Scratch Fever"
2008	La estación de la Calle Olvera	Catrina	Television film
2014	Feed Me	Lulu	Episode: "The Goal of Sexual Intercourse"
2016	Alley Way	Louisa	Episode: "One Man's Trash"
2018	Vida	Cruz	6 episodes
2020	Warrior	Rosalita Vega	Main Role, 5 episodes, season 2
