= Suffering Man's Charity =

Suffering Man's Charity (a.k.a. Ghost Writer)
- Poster.
- Directed by: Alan Cumming
- Written by: Thomas Gallagher
- Starring: Alan Cumming; David Boreanaz
- Cinematography: Alex Vendler
- Music by: Paul Cantelon
- Distributed by: Blue Harbor Entertainment
- Release date: 2007
- Running time: 93 minutes
- Country: United States

Suffering Man's Charity, later released under the title Ghost Writer, is a 2007 comedy/horror film directed by Alan Cumming, written by playwright Thomas Gallagher, and starring Alan Cumming and David Boreanaz.

== Plot ==
John, an eccentric music teacher, takes in Sebastian, a younger writer—ostensibly to help him, but in truth because he’s attracted to him. When Sebastian begins a serious relationship with a woman, John becomes jealous and starts a fight that ultimately leads to Sebastian’s accidental death. Afterward, John discovers Sebastian’s unpublished manuscript and decides to publish it under his own name.

== Cast ==
- Alan Cumming as John Vandermark
- David Boreanaz as Sebastian St. Germain
- Anne Heche as Helen Jacobsen
- Henry Thomas as Eric Rykell
- Karen Black as Renee
- Jane Lynch as Ingrid Sorensen
- Carrie Fisher as Reporter
- Maria-Elena Laas as Liliana
- Rachelle Lefevre as Elaine
- Ermahn Ospina as Pedro
- Alison Guh as Evelyn

== Reception ==
On the review aggregator website Rotten Tomatoes, 40% of 5 critics' reviews are positive.
