= Teatro Luna =

Teatro Luna is an all-Latina theatre ensemble based in Chicago. The group was founded by Coya Paz and Tanya Saracho in 2001 in response to their experiences with a lack of representation of Latinas in the media and theatre scene. Teatro Luna focuses on creating work with other Latinas that reflects a variety of Latina experiences. Since 2001 the group has created over 13 collaborative productions, including Generic Latina (2001) and MACHOS (2007). The company has performed in a variety of theatres across Chicago, and expanded to a location in Los Angeles in 2014.

== History ==
In 2000 Coya Paz and Tanya Saracho met at an audition and began discussing their observations of a lack of spaces for Latina actresses in the Chicago theatre scene and beyond. This led to a later meeting at a coffee shop where they discussed the idea of forming an all Latina theatre group that would create its own works based on Latina experiences. The original company consisted of Paz, Saracho, and ten women from varying Latina backgrounds. Together the company worked to put together shows that consisted of stories of each of the women that reflected the multitudes of stories and experiences in the Latina community. These pieces spoke against the stereotyping of Latinas into a few specific roles and experiences in the wider theatre community.

== Collaborative process ==
The collaborative process of creating pieces includes seven different steps in which the members of the group share their different ideas and experiences with the group and then come back with more structured research or scripts. They then work these pieces and ideas in smaller groups and approach the piece from multiple different angles. They then present these different approaches to the other members, who are welcome to try out their own ideas, and the group decides on the preferred approach. One member then scripts the 'official' version, but changes are continually made throughout the rehearsal and performance process.

== Productions ==
The first collaborative piece the company performed was Generic Latina in 2001. The play consists of 20 vignettes based on the personal experiences of the company member and each provide a different take on what it means to be a Latina. In 2003 the company performed their first single author play, Kita Y Fernanda, by founder Tanya Saracho. The company developed one of their hit shows, MACHOS, in 2007 in which they examined traditional Latino male gender roles and what it means to be a Latino man. The play was developed after conducting hundred of nationwide interviews with Latino men, but was performed by the all female company. In 2009 founder Coya Paz left the company and in 2010 she was followed by fellow founder Tanya Saracho.

In 2010 Teatro Luna performed GL 2010: Not Your Generic Latina to reassert themselves under new administration as well as address the changes in the lives of Latinas in the ten years since the company's founding. In 2013 the company partnered with playwright Emilio Williams to perform their first show written by a man, Your Problem With Men, at the world premiere in Chicago. Teatro Luna took this show with them to their new location in Los Angeles, Teatro Luna West, in 2014 for the west coast premiere. The company then took their collaborative show Luna Unlaced on tour across the nation to different colleges and theaters in 2013. In 2015 Teatro Luna premiered Generation Sex at their Los Angeles location after a year long workshop tour. In 2017 the company returned to Chicago to perform Lovesick, a collection of stories about the violence inflicted on Latina bodies as a part of the Chicago International Latino Theater Festival: Destinos.

== Other projects ==
In addition to their collaborative shows, Teatro Luna also supports individual works. In the company's early days they implemented SÓLOS Latinas Project in which they fostered the efforts of local Latina writers. This program was a collection of workshops in which the women worked on their own individual works and several were selected to be produced in the SÓLOS Latinas production in 2005. This project was followed by a second installment of workshops and stories in SÓLO Tú (2008).

The company also offers numerous labs for directing, new works, producing, and PlayLab for developing new playwrights. Teatro Luna also offers different workshops and classes year round in an effort to increase the availability of creative resources and training to Latinas. They also have labs and classes available for youth in the community.

The company also takes their shows and workshops on tours nationally and internationally in order to spread their message and increase awareness nation and world wide. Teatro Luna will visit a variety of locations such as universities, festivals, and private settings.

== Production history ==
Production History
Play	Playwright	Director	Theatre	Year
Probadita	Teatro Luna Collaboration	Arati Kasturirangan	Victory Gardens	2000
Mas Probadita	Teatro Luna Collaboration	Arati Kasturirangan	Victory Gardens	2000
Generic Latina	Teatro Luna Collaboration	Arati Kasturirangan	Phoenix Ascending Theatre	2001
Generic Latina	Teatro Luna Collaboration	Tanya Saracho	Teatro Luna at Pilsen in Chicago	2002
Dejame Contarte	Teatro Luna Collaboration	Alexandra Lopez	Storefront Theatre, Chicago	2001
Otra Probadita	Teatro Luna Collaboration		psNBC at HERE, NYC	2002
Kita Y Fernanda	Tanya Saracho	Marcela Muñoz	Teatro Luna at Pilsen in Chicago	2003
The Maria Chronicles	Teatro Luna Collaboration	Coya Paz and Tanya Saracho	Goodman Theatre	July 2003
The Maria Chronicles	Teatro Luna Collaboration	Coya Paz and Tanya Saracho	Teatro Luna at Pilsen in Chicago	Oct.-Nov. 2003
The Maria Chronicles	Teatro Luna Collaboration	Coya Paz and Tanya Saracho	Theatre-on-the-Lake, Chicago	August 2004
Sólo Latinas Readings	SÓLO Latinas Workshop		No Exit Café, Chicago	August 2004
Sólo Latinas	Miranda Gonzalez, Diane Herrera, Tanya Saracho, and Marisabel Suarez		Chicago Dramatists	January 2005
Adnakiel (Reading)	Tanya Saracho		with Chicago Dramatists	February 2005
Probadita de S-E-X-Oh!*	Teatro Luna Collaboration	Coya Paz and Tanya Saracho	Athenaeum Theatre (PACedge), Chicago	March 2005
Sólo Latinas	Miranda Gonzalez, Diane Herrera, Tanya Saracho, and Marisabel Suarez		Theatre-on-the-Lake, Chicago	June 2005
S-E-X-Oh!	Teatro Luna Collaboration	Coya Paz and Tanya Saracho	Chicago Dramatists	2006
Quita Mitos	Tanya Saracho		Viaduct Theatre	Nov-Dec 2006
LUNATIC(A)S	Tanya Saracho	Tanya Saracho	Chicago Dramatists	June–July 2007
MACHOS	Teatro Luna Collaboration	Coya Paz	Chicago Dramatists	November 2007
MACHOS	Teatro Luna Collaboration	Coya Paz	16th Street Theatre	Jan.-Feb. 2008
SÓLO Tú	Teatro Luna Collaboration	Tanya Saracho	Chicago Dramatists	2008
Jarred (Reading at Goodman Latino Theatre Fest)*	Tanya Saracho			2008
Jarred: A Hoodoo Comedy	Tanya Saracho		Chicago Dramatists	Nov.-Dec. 2008
S-E-X-Oh! (The Remix)	Teatro Luna Collaboration	Yadira Correa and Dana Cruz	16th Street Theatre	2009
Probadita de Luna*				2009
LUNATIC(A)S	Tanya Saracho	Tanya Saracho	Chicago Dramatists	Nov.-Dec. 2009
GL 2010: Not Your Generic Latina	Teatro Luna Collaboration	Miranda Gonzalez	Chicago Dramatists	June–July 2010
Lullaby	Diane Herrera	Maria Enriquez and Miranda Gonzalez	Greenhouse Theater Center	2010
THE NORTH/SOUTH PLAYS	collaboration with Teatro Luna and Bailiwick Chicago		Chicago Center for the Performing Arts	Oct.-Nov. 2011
CROSSED Probadita*	Teatro Luna Collaboration			2011
CROSSED: Immigrant = Mexican? (World Premiere)	Teatro Luna Collaboration	Miranda Gonzalez	Luna Central, Chicago	Feb.- March 2012
Living Large in a Mini Kind of Way	Diane Rodriguez	Diane Rodriguez	The Viaduct Theatre	May–June 2012
Solo Tres, Three full length Solo Plays: Cry Wolf, Sexomedy, and PUTAS!	PUTAS! - Liza Ann Acosta Cry Wolf - Kristiana Colón Sexomedy - Melissa Duprey	PUTAS!- Alexandra Meda Cry Wolf-Coya Paz	Luna Central, Chicago	Oct.-Nov. 2012
A Very Luna Christmas	Paula Ramirez, Abigail Vega, and Teatro Luna Ensemble	Paula Ramirez and Abigail Vega	Luna Central, Chicago	December 2012-January 2013
Your Problem With Men (World Premiere)	Emilio Williams	Alexandra Meda	Stage 773	March–April 2013
Your Problem With Men (West Coast Premiere) Part of Encuentro 2014*	Emilio Williams	Alexandra Meda	Los Angeles Theatre Center	2014
Generation Sex (World Premiere)*	Teatro Luna Collaboration	Alexandra Meda	Los Angeles Theatre Center	April–May 2015
Talking While Female	Solo stories		Milagro, Portland	June 2017
Lovesick	Teatro Luna Collaboration	Alexandra Meda	Victory Gardens Theater/ Richard Christiansen Theater	October 2017

*indicates Probaditas or workshop performances

== Tours and workshops ==
Tours and Workshops
Tour	Location	Year
Generation Sex Workshop		March 2013
Luna Unlaced National Tour	16 cities across Southwest, West Coast, and New York City and Boston	June-Aug. 2013
Luna Unlaced International Tour	Edinburgh Fringe Festival, The Republic of Ireland, and Dublin	Aug.-Sept 2013
Generation Sex Workshop Remix	Chicago Fringe Festival	Sept.-Oct. 2013
Generation Sex National Development Tour	Texas, Louisiana, and Connecticut	March–April 2014
Generation Sex Workshop Tour	Fools Fury Factory Ensemble Festival	July 2014
Generation Sex Full Workshop	Instituto Cervantes	June 2014
