= Tanya Saracho =

American dramatist

- Born: Tanya Selene Saracho; 1976 or 1977 (age 49–50); Los Mochis, Sinaloa, Mexico
- Education: Boston University
- Occupations: Screenwriter; playwright
- Years active: 1998–present
- Title: Co-founder of Teatro Luna

Tanya Selene Saracho is a Mexican-American actress, playwright, dramaturge and screenwriter. With a background in theater before writing for television, she co-founded Teatro Luna in 2000 and was its co-artistic director for ten years. She also co-founded the Alliance of Latinx Theater Artists (ALTA) of Chicago. Her work centers Latina perspectives and characters. She developed and was showrunner of the Starz series Vida, which ran for three seasons (2018–2020). Saracho signed a three-year development deal with Starz in February 2018.

== Early life ==
Tanya Selene Saracho was born in Los Mochis, Sinaloa, Mexico, to Ramiro A. Saracho, head customs officer with the Servicio de Administración Tributaria and a powerful figure in the conservative Institutional Revolutionary Party, and Rosalina Armenta. After her parents' divorce, her childhood was split between Reynosa, Tamaulipas, where her father lived, and just across the border in McAllen, Texas, where she and her mother chose to reside together with her two younger sisters Tatiana Saracho and Fresy Saracho. Both cities are part of the bi-national Reynosa–McAllen metropolitan area straddling the Rio Grande (Spanish: Río Bravo del Norte). She and her family-members went back and forth between Mexico and the United States often — with her father commuting over the border in 2008. She attended middle and high school in McAllen and enrolled in Boston University College of Fine Arts to study theater, earning a Bachelor of Fine Arts degree.

== Career ==
=== Theater ===
Saracho moved to Chicago in 1998 and began working as an actress, but found her opportunities largely confined to typecast roles as maids or sex workers. In June 2000 she co-founded the theater company Teatro Luna with Coya Paz; its original ensemble was made up of ten Latina performers.

Saracho took part in the creation of numerous works through Teatro Luna, including Machos, Dejame Contarte (Let Me Tell You), The María Chronicles and S-E-X-Oh!. Machos is a play examining "contemporary masculinities", drawn from interviews with fifty men across the U.S. and performed by the all-Latina cast in drag; it won two non-Equity Jeff Awards.

Saracho parted with the group in January 2010 to focus on playwriting. The same year, she co-founded The Alliance of Latinx Theater Artists (ALTA) of Chicago, a service organization for Latinx-identified theater artists in the city.

Multiple plays that she worked on in this time received nominations for the Jeff Award. She also worked as an outside actor on occasion during her time at Teatro Luna.

One of her first works after leaving Teatro Luna was El Nogalar for the Goodman Theatre, co-produced with Teatro Vista, as a reconstruction of Anton Chekhov's The Cherry Orchard set in the pecan orchards of Northern Mexico amid the drug wars, which ran at the Goodman Theatre from March 26 to April 24, 2011. At that time, she was resident playwright emeritus at Chicago Dramatists, resident playwright at Teatro Vista, a Goodman Theatre Fellow at the Ellen Stone Belic Institute for the Study of Women and Gender in the Arts and Media at Columbia College Chicago and an artistic associate with Chicago's LGBTQ-oriented About Face Theatre. She was also then working on two Andrew W. Mellon Foundation commissions for Steppenwolf Theatre, an adaptation of a Sor Juana Inés de la Cruz play for Oregon Shakespeare Festival called The Tenth Muse, and a historical fiction piece for About Face Theatre called The Good Private. The latter, about a transgender soldier in the American Civil War, was inspired by the story of Albert Cashier, assigned female at birth in Ireland but who lived out his life in Illinois as a man after fighting for the Union Army. In late 2012, her play Song for the Disappeared, about an estranged borderland family brought together by the disappearance of their younger brother, was performed at the Goodman Theatre.

Her 2014 work also included Mala Hierba at the Second Stage Uptown and Hushabye as part of Steppenwolf's First Look in 2014. She founded the Ñ Project and is a member of The Kilroys' List, SAG-AFTRA and the Writers Guild of America West; she has also worked as a voice-over actress.

=== Television ===
In 2012, Saracho began working in television, benefiting from the ABC Diversity program. In her first TV job, as a staff writer at Lifetime's Devious Maids in 2013, she has said that a colleague referred to her as "the diversity writer", and that her agent confirmed her salary was not drawn from the showrunner's budget. In 2014, Saracho wrote a two-hander for the Goodman Theatre in which one character was a first-year TV writer and the other a janitor. The Denver Theatre Center commissioned Saracho to expand that work to create Fade, which premiered there in 2016.

After Devious Maids, Saracho wrote for HBO's Girls and Looking (in 2013–14), along with ABC's How to Get Away with Murder. Saracho continued writing for theater while also writing for television, including two theater commissions, one set in Red Bank, New Jersey and the other in Costa Mesa, California. Between seasons of Looking, Saracho worked on The Tenth Muse, an all-female play set in a convent in Colonial Mexico.

==== Vida ====
Saracho, working with the production company Big Beach, created, co-wrote, and co-produced the show Vida. She assembled an all-Latinx, "heavily queer" writers' room and directorial team who are all Latinx or women of color. Like much of Saracho's theater work, the dialog in Vida is in Spanglish.

In February 2018, Saracho signed a three-year deal with Starz. She has described the first season of Vida as a three-hour pilot.

In February 2018, Saracho signed a 3-year deal with Starz. She has described season 1 of Vida as a three-hour pilot.

She is also developing another series with Big Beach called Brujas, based on her 2007 play Enfrascada, which will follow four Afro-Caribbean / Latinx Chicagoans within the brujería counter-culture.

== Awards and recognition ==
Saracho was named the Best New Playwright by Chicago magazine, one of the nine national Luminarios by Café magazine and given the first Revolucionario award in theater by the National Museum of Mexican Art. She has also won the Goodman's Ofner Prize, a 3Arts Artists Award and a National Endowment for the Arts Distinguished New Play Development Project Grant with About Face Theater. In January 2019, she was presented with the 2019 Final Draft New Voice Award for Television and won the 2019 GLAAD Media Award for Outstanding Comedy Series for Vida.

In June 2020, in honor of the 50th anniversary of the first LGBTQ Pride parade, Queerty named her among the fifty heroes “leading the nation toward equality, acceptance, and dignity for all people”.

== Personal life ==
Saracho identifies as queer. She was diagnosed with diabetes in 2010, of which there is a family history. She has also spoken about suffering from anxiety and impostor syndrome.

By 2008, as a green card-holder, she was the only member of her family who had not naturalized to American citizenship, being unready to renounce her Mexican citizenship. She has said that in 2008, she chose to become a U.S. citizen in order to vote for Barack Obama in the 2008 presidential election.

Saracho grew up in the trans-border area between Tamaulipas and Texas – a frequent setting for her plays – however she considers herself a Chicagoan. She has also spoken out about racism that she has experienced in Chicago.

She grew up, went to school and to college with fellow Mexican-American actor Raúl Castillo, who she was in a relationship with as a teenager. Castillo is featured in a key episode for his character in Looking. After being disowned by her father in 2014, Saracho took a 2-week trip to Scotland, inspired by her love of Outlander.

Saracho has cited a number of individuals as influences, including the 17th-century nun Juana Inés de la Cruz, African-American playwrights and professors Lynn Nottage and Lydia R. Diamond, Cuban-American avant-garde playwright María Irene Fornés, British director Caroline Eves, and LGBT writer and director Luis Alfaro

== List of works ==
=== Theatre ===
- Generic Latina (2001)
- Dejame Contarte ("Let Me Tell You", 2001)
- Kita y Fernanda (2002)
- The María Chronicles (2003)
- Electricidad ("Electricity", 2004, performing as Vecina)
- S-E-X-Oh! (2005 and reworked in 2006)
- Quita Mitos ("Removing Myths", 2006, 3 female characters)
- Sólo Tú (2007, 4 female monologues, 1 by Saracho)
- Lunáticas (2007)
- Machos (2007)
- Enfrascada (2008, 5 female)
- Our Lady of the Underpass (2009, 2 male, 4 female)
- The House on Mango Street (2009)
- El Nogalar (2011, 1 male, 4 female)
- Song for the Disappeared (2012)
- The Tenth Muse (2013, 7 female)
- The Good Private (2013)
- Mala Hierba ("Weed", 2014, 4 female)
- Hushabye (2014, 3 male, 2 female)
- Fade (2016, 1 male, 1 female)

=== Television ===
| Year | Title | Role(s) | Notes |
|---|---|---|---|
| 2013 | Devious Maids | Staff writer | Episode 1x07: "Taking a Message"; Episode 1x09: "Scrambling the Eggs" |
| 2014–2015 | Looking | Story editor | Episode 1x04: "Looking for $220/Hour"; Episode 1x06: "Looking in the Mirror"; Episode 1x08: "Looking Glass"; Episode 2x05: "Looking for Truth"; Episode 2x09: "Looking for Sanctuary" |
| 2015 | Looking | Co-producer | All 10 episodes of season 2 |
| 2015 | Looking | Ceci, Richie's cousin | Episode 2x05: "Looking for Truth" |
| 2015–2016 | How to Get Away with Murder | Co-producer | Episodes 2x01–2x06 |
| 2015–2016 | How to Get Away with Murder | Writer | Episode 2x08: "Hi, I'm Philip"; Episode 2x12: "It's a Trap" |
| 2018–2020 | Vida | Creator, executive producer and showrunner | All 3 seasons and 22 episodes |
| 2018–2020 | Vida | Writer | Episode 1x01: "Episode 1"; Episode 1x02: "Episode 2"; Episode 1x06: "Episode 6"; Episode 2x01: "Episode 7"; Episode 2x09: "Episode 15"; Episode 2x10: "Episode 16"; Episode 3x01: "Episode 17"; Episode 3x06: "Episode 22" |
| 2018–2020 | Vida | Director | Episode 2x10: "Episode 16"; Episode 3x04: "Episode 20"; Episode 3x05: "Episode 21"; Episode 3x06: "Episode 22" |
