= Vida (TV series) =

2018 American comedy-drama television series

- Genre: Comedy-drama
- Created by: Tanya Saracho
- Based on: "Pour Vida" by Richard Villegas Jr.
- Starring: Melissa Barrera; Mishel Prada; Ser Anzoategui; Chelsea Rendon; Carlos Miranda; Maria-Elena Laas; Roberta Colindrez
- Composer: Germaine Franco
- Country of origin: United States
- Original languages: English; Spanish
- No. of seasons: 3
- No. of episodes: 22

Production
- Executive producers: Marc Turtletaub; Peter Saraf; Robin Schwartz; Stephanie Langhoff; Tanya Saracho
- Producers: Chrisann Verges; Jenniffer Gómez; Jamie Vega Wheeler
- Cinematography: Carmen Cabana; Ava Berkofsky; Tarin Anderson
- Editors: JoAnne Yarrow; Amy Duddleston; Liza D. Espinas
- Camera setup: Single-camera
- Running time: 31–40 minutes
- Production companies: Big Beach; Chingona Productions

Original release
- Network: Starz
- Release: May 6, 2018 – May 31, 2020

Vida is an American comedy-drama television series created by Tanya Saracho and inspired by the short story "Pour Vida" by Richard Villegas Jr. The series stars Melissa Barrera, Mishel Prada, Ser Anzoategui, Chelsea Rendon, Carlos Miranda, Maria-Elena Laas, and Roberta Colindrez. Vida tells the story of two Mexican American sisters who move back to their childhood home in Boyle Heights, Los Angeles after the death of their mother.

Vida premiered on May 6, 2018, on Starz. The series was renewed by Starz for a third season less than a week after the second season's debut. In March 2020, it was announced that the third season would be the final season as Starz had cancelled the program. The third season premiered on April 26, 2020.

Vida received critical acclaim. Each season holds a 100% score on review aggregator Rotten Tomatoes. The program received a 2019 GLAAD Media Award for Outstanding Comedy Series.

== Premise ==
Vida follows "two Mexican American sisters, Emma and Lyn, from the Eastside of Los Angeles who couldn't be more different or distanced from each other. Circumstances force them to return to their old neighborhood, where they are confronted by the past and shocking truth about their mother's identity."

== Cast and characters ==
=== Main ===
- Melissa Barrera as Lynda "Lyn" Hernandez, a free-spirited vegan woman who dated mostly wealthy white men in San Francisco and who moves back home to Boyle Heights, Los Angeles after the death of her mother.
- Mishel Prada as Emma Hernandez, a type-A personality queer woman with a high-paying corporate executive job in Chicago who moves back to Boyle Heights, Los Angeles after the death of her mother. She is Lyn's older sister.
- Ser Anzoategui as Edwina "Eddy" Martínez, the butch widow of Lyn and Emma's mother, Vida, and co-owner of the bar.
- Chelsea Rendon as Marisol "Mari" Sanchez, an activist who wants to preserve her community from gentrification. She is Johnny's little sister.
- Carlos Miranda as Johnny Sanchez, a mechanic and Lyn's former high school flame with whom she has an on-and-off relationship.
- Maria Elena Laas as Cruz (seasons 1–2), Emma's friend and former love interest, whom Emma is with again temporarily.
- Roberta Colindrez as Nico Silva (seasons 2–3), Emma's love interest and bartender at Vida.

=== Recurring ===
- Elena Campbell-Martínez as Doña Lupe, a woman who lives in the Hernandez sister's building who practices santeria
- Ramses Jimenez as Tlaloc Medina (season 1–2), an activist in the same group as Mari who is also her love interest.
- Luis Bordonada as Nelson Herrera, the man who wants to buy Lyn, Emma, and Eddy's bar and who sexually harassed Emma.
- Elizabeth De Razzo as Yoli, Mari's best friend and fellow activist.
- Renée Victor as Doña Tita
- Adelina Anthony as Rocky, Eddy's friend.
- Erika Soto as Karla Sanchez, the mother of Johnny's child and Johnny's ex-wife.
- Vanessa Giselle as Lucky aka "Femme"
- Raúl Castillo as Baco Nava (season 2), the new handyman for the bar. Emma uses him for sex.
- Adrian Gonzalez as Rudy Marquez (season 2–3), Lyn's love interest who is a city councilman
- Tonatiuh as Marcos Zamora, a queer man and PhD holder who is friends with Cruz and moves into Lyn and Emma's building.

== Episodes ==
Season	Episodes	Originally released	
Season	Episodes	First released	Last released
1	6	May 6, 2018	June 10, 2018
2	10	May 26, 2019	June 23, 2019
3	6	April 26, 2020	May 31, 2020

=== Season 1 (2018) ===
No. overall	No. in season	Title	Directed by	Written by	Original release date	U.S. viewers (millions)
1	1	"Episode 1"	Alonso Ruizpalacios	Tanya Saracho	May 6, 2018	0.020
Two estranged sisters, Emma and Lyn, return to their old neighborhood, Boyle Heights, Los Angeles, after the sudden death of their mother Vidalia ("Vida" for short). Upon their return, they are introduced to Vidalia’s "roommate," Eddy. At the memorial service Emma feels distant and out of place, while Lyn is eager to reunite with her high school lover, Johnny. A young woman named Cruz shows up to express her condolences, which captures Emma's attention. Johnny reveals that Vida was actually married to Eddy, which infuriates Emma for reasons that are unknown to Lyn. To complicate matters further, Vida willed 30 percent of the ownership of their family-owned bar to Eddy and split the other 70 percent between Emma and Lyn. At a local restaurant, Emma tells Lyn that they need to sell the bar. The sisters run into Johnny's little sister Mari, which results in an argument. When the sisters return home and announce their plan, Eddy announces that she will never sell.
2	2	"Episode 2"	So Yong Kim	Tanya Saracho & Santa Sierra	May 13, 2018	0.181
Mari vandalizes a local store that has been gentrified and the distressed owner confronts her. Emma meets with a local realtor and learns that he sold Vidalia a predatory mortgage on the bar when Vidalia was unable to pay off her first mortgage. The realtor says he can still get Emma an offer for the bar and proceeds to touch her leg suggestively. Appalled, Emma spills her coffee on his lap and states she will never sell to him. Lyn goes for a run and ends up at the garage Johnny works at. Johnny proclaims that he has never been happier in his life, as he has a fiancé and baby on the way, and that Lyn needs to stay away from him. They end up having sex and Mari sees them. Upon arriving back home, Emma tells Lyn that they need to stay a little longer. Emma, Lyn and Eddy end up eating flan together.
3	3	"Episode 3"	Rashaad Ernesto Green	Evangeline Ordaz	May 20, 2018	0.133
Emma hooks up with a nonbinary person from a dating app, which she reveals to Lyn when she gets home. Lyn says that she supports Emma and however her sister identifies. Eddy’s anguish over Vidalia’s death comes out in a confrontation with Emma and Lyn over the bar’s troubled financial statements, and Eddy continues to struggle. Mari attends a meeting for neighborhood activists and is distracted by her crush, Tlaloc. After the meeting, Tlaloc expresses interest in Mari and prompts her to give him a blow-job, and she complies. Tlaloc films the act, unbeknownst to Mari. Carla, Johnny's fiancé, goes to the bar to confront Lyn about the affair and is greeted by Eddy first, then Emma, and finally Lyn. At night on the roof of the bar, Eddy smokes a cigar with a friend and discusses how waiting to enjoy the finer things in life is a waste of time. They express that instead, people should seize moments that will bring them happiness. Eddy mentions that Vidalia wanted to make things right with Emma, which Emma overhears as she smokes a cigarette on a fire escape.
4	4	"Episode 4"	Rose Troche	Chelsey Lora	May 27, 2018	0.148
Feeling rejected in many ways, Lyn goes on a shopping spree with one of Vidalia's credit cards. She runs into a young man who invites her to a party in the Hollywood Hills, which she attends. Lyn's perception of herself shifts as she watches the Latina housekeeper at the party and deals with her new acquaintance's offhand comments about Latino people. Emma goes to another bar to scope out the competition, and Cruz is surprised to see her there. Cruz invites Emma to hang out with her friends and they all continue to drink as the night progresses. Emma reveals that her mother sent her away twice in her youth, which she later realized was due to Vidalia’s internalized homophobia. Emma and Cruz act on their romantic connection, but Emma ends up having a panic attack. Mari proceeds normally throughout her day at work and attends another activist meeting. When she brings up recent changes about Vidalia’s bar, everyone looks at her strangely. Mari’s friend shows her the explicit video of Mari, which Tlaloc sent to people. Tlaloc finds Mari and says he did not spread the video, but she remains skeptical and hurt.
5	5	"Episode 5"	Catalina Aguilar Mastretta	Mando Alvarado	June 3, 2018	0.136
6	6	"Episode 6"	Rose Troche	Tanya Saracho	June 10, 2018	0.163

=== Season 2 (2019) ===
No. overall	No. in season	Title	Directed by	Written by	Original release date	U.S. viewers (millions)
7	1	"Episode 7"	Catalina Aguilar Mastretta	Tanya Saracho	May 26, 2019	0.135
Emma quits her job, liquidates all her assets and moves back from Chicago to make a go of the bar, despite a former colleague rubbishing her business plan. Lyn sells some dresses to raise cash but opens a bill for $6000 that she's run up on Vidalia's credit cards. She bumps into Johnny outside the community center, upsetting Carla; Marisol later finds him drinking on the stoop, also upset. Nelson starts renovating the building catercorner to the bar and tells Emma that Eddy and Vida might not have been legally married. The bar hosts a fundraiser for Eddy's medical costs after she was queerbashed at the end of the previous season. Emma visits Eddy and brings her home to the apartment and they find Don Fole, one of their tenants has died.
8	2	"Episode 8"	Catalina Aguilar Mastretta	Evangeline Ordaz	May 26, 2019	0.107
Marisol loses one of her 3 jobs for arriving late. Going through the vacant apartment to list Don Fole's stuff for online sale, Lyn discovers a locket and some letters. Emma and Cruz make out in the shower. Emma, Lyn and Eddy discuss renting the vacant apartment; they agree not to look for upmarket tenants. Emma meets Baco, the new handyman; they don't see eye to eye. Emma and Lyn nurse Eddy. Mari goes to a party where she sees Tlāloc, who apologises for the video; they go back to his and have sex.
9	3	"Episode 9"	Jenée LaMarque	Nancy C. Mejia & Jenniffer Gomez	June 2, 2019	0.140
Emma agrees to go with Cruz to her cousin's gay wedding; Emma is uncomfortable with the group's queerness and walks out on Cruz before making friends with Nico, the lesbian best man. At the gym, Lyn meets Rudy, a city councilman. Marisol comes by to pay back Emma, who hires her to nurse Eddy. Lyn runs a millennial Lotería at the bar, but the regulars are unimpressed with the innovation. Doña Lupe talks to Lyn about the limpia and about Vida watching from the afterlife.
10	4	"Episode 10"	Jenée LaMarque	Chelsey Lora	June 2, 2019	0.128
Cleaning up the office behind the bar, Emma gets upset that there's nothing from her; Lyn spends her time scrolling through Instagram. Jonny visits Carla before her baby shower; Lyn helps him out but Johnny asks her to avoid him. Emma gives Lyn her card to get supplies. Nico comes by the bar and makes suggestions; Emma offers her a job. Marisol and Lyn argue; Lyn bonds with Doña Tita over pot tamales on the roof. Mari accidentally washes the T-shirt Eddy was keeping that smelled of Vida. After using Baco for sex, Emma finds another box and tearfully sifts through photos and memories.
11	5	"Episode 11"	Gandja Monteiro	Nancy C. Mejia & Elena Crevello	June 9, 2019	0.112
After a sleepless night on her birthday morning, Emma stresses out about the bar's finances. Rudy and Lyn make out after the gym but she holds to her vow of celibacy; he comes by the yard sale and Johnny looks on jealously. Eddy fights with Emma about not being consulted over the bar and the apartments. Nelson snoops in the bar and the fire department closes them down for 30 days over code violations and unpaid fines; Nico helps Emma calm down and Lyn has sex with Rudy before getting him to speed up the fire marshal's visit.
12	6	"Episode 12"	Gandja Monteiro	Mando Alvarado	June 9, 2019	0.108
When the locket she found from Don Fole's apartment falls open, Lyn finds Vida's photo inside. Marcos moves into Don Fole's apartment. Eddy tells Mari she no longer needs nursing; Mari and Emma watch a mural being painted over by Nelson's workers before Mari goes to visit Tlāloc and they talk about if she should go back to school. Nico sees Lisa pocketing money from the bar; Emma fires her straightaway. When looking for headache pills, Emma finds the debt notices in Lyn's purse and Lyn admits that she owes almost $14,000 before Emma walks away wordlessly.
13	7	"Episode 13"	Jenée LaMarque	Gladys Rodriguez	June 16, 2019	0.103
Someone sends Johnny the video of Marisol giving Tlāloc head; Johnny reacts by beating him up, so Tlāloc breaks up with Mari and her dad kicks her out. Lyn visits Doña Lupe to help find Emma but receives advice she doesn't want to hear. Marcos offers Lyn moral support; they chat about colorism and set Nelson up. Eddy goes down to the bar and is upset by all the changes. Nico helps Emma get her head straight, but she confronts Eddy about the will. Mari picks up her last paycheck and Emma tells her to stay overnight. Nico stops Eddy from driving drunk. Lyn performs another limpia.
14	8	"Episode 14"	Jenée LaMarque	Esti Giordani	June 16, 2019	0.132
The Chicano mural of Emma and Lyn is painted over as advertising space. Nico and Emma go to an after-hours party; Lyn and Marcos show up, leading to Emma fighting with Lyn and with Nico. When Lyn gets thrown out of the club, she drunk-texts Johnny, who comes to take her home, and they have sex.
15	9	"Episode 15"	Nancy C. Mejia	Tanya Saracho & Mando Alvarado	June 23, 2019	0.112
After staying overnight with Nico, Emma shares a moment before Nico's ex-girlfriend arrives back. Emma gets home to see the advert vandalized and more bills; Marisol gives Emma some advice. Jonny and Lyn plan a day together, but Karla goes into labor, and when she gets home, Lyn argues with Emma, who is frosty to both Nico and Baco. Lyn books a musician for residency. Talking with Rocky and a lawyer, Eddy discovers Vida was still married — and that her widower is still alive. Emma uses Baco for sex again.
16	10	"Episode 16"	Tanya Saracho	Tanya Saracho	June 23, 2019	0.121
Lyn and Doña Lupe limpian the bar. Lyn and Emma argue while Emma continues in depression. Emma visits Baco after he sends her a nil invoice and she apologizes. Eddy goes to meet Vida's widower. Nico and Emma make love. Los Vigilantes protest the bar's new music night; Mari tries to warn Lyn, but she doesn't understand gentrification. When Lyn attempts to talk to the protesters, Emma comes to her rescue and realizes how hard she's been working.

=== Season 3 (2020) ===
No. overall	No. in season	Title	Directed by	Written by	Original release date	U.S. viewers (millions)
17	1	"Episode 17"	Jenée LaMarque	Story by : Tanya Saracho; Teleplay by : Tanya Saracho & Taylor Orci	April 26, 2020	0.099
Emma and Nico become closer, despite Zoe turning up to the bar to make trouble; when Nico says she's going to move her things out of the flat she shares with Zoe, Emma agrees that Nico can move in. Mari is sleeping on the couch in Johnny's office and is losing the trust of the vigiliantes after not being arrested with Yoli, though Yoli is more supportive. Johnny proudly shows Mari a photo of his new daughter and tells her that he and Carla are reconciling. Lyn goes to Rudy's mother's birthday party and worries that she's "not Mexican enough". Eddy decides to tell the girls about their father by letter, rather than face to face, leaving quickly when Emma opens the door as Eddy slides the letter under.
18	2	"Episode 18"	Jenée LaMarque	Gladys Rodriguez	May 3, 2020	0.110
Emma and Lyn set up food at Vida to raise money for a local non-profit in the hope that it will help keep the vigilantes off their back. Zoe shows up to tell Emma that she and Nico are still married; Nico explain that it was so she could stay on Zoe's medical insurance but Emma dumps her regardless. Doña Lupe confirms to Emma and Lyn that their father is still alive but warns Lyn that there's a reason Vida didn't tell them. After baby Elenita was unwell, Johnny forgot to take their father to a medical appointment; Mari goes to take him the next day but finds him having died in his sleep. As family gather for a wake, their tía declines to help with funeral costs; Lyn arrives to pay her respects afterwards and Johnny breaks down because his father didn't get to meet Elenita.
19	3	"Episode 19"	Jenée LaMarque	Lindsey Villarreal	May 10, 2020	0.082
20	4	"Episode 20"	Tanya Saracho	Esti Giordani	May 17, 2020	0.086
21	5	"Episode 21"	Tanya Saracho	Jenniffer Gómez	May 24, 2020	0.070
22	6	"Episode 22"	Tanya Saracho	Tanya Saracho	May 31, 2020	0.115

== Production ==
=== Development ===
On January 8, 2016, the series was first announced as being in development at the Television Critics Association press tour in Pasadena, California, during Starz's executive session. The show was announced alongside two other projects based on Spanish-language formats and stories from Hispanic creators. The series, then titled Pour Vida, was inspired by the short story of the same name by Richard Villegas Jr. Executive producers were set to include Marc Turtletaub, Dan Pasternack, and Erin Keating. Production companies involved with the series were slated to consist of Big Beach.

On September 13, 2017, it was announced that Starz had given the show, now entitled Vida, a series order. Executive producers for the series were now expected to include Turtletaub, Tanya Saracho, Peter Saraf, and Robin Schwartz. Saracho was also set to serve as showrunner for the series and Alonso Ruizpalacios was set to direct the first episode. Upon joining the production, Saracho assembled an all-Latino writers' room — with writers who were all female-identified except for one cisgender male and half of whom identified as queer. Similarly, the casting director, composer, and editor of the series were also all female and Latina. As Starz had already established a basic premise for the series prior to her hiring, Saracho continued to develop the project and sought to imbue the series with more LGBTQ representation saying, "They wanted a female millennial show about gentefication, which is the gentrification of a Latino space. The queerness came from me. I identify as queer, and it had to be there."

On January 12, 2018, it was announced at the annual Television Critics Association winter press tour that the series would premiere on May 6, 2018. On June 12, 2018, it was reported that Starz had renewed the series for a second season. The 10–episode second season will be released on Starz on Demand, StarzPlay and Starz app on May 23, 2019, ahead of its official premiere on May 26, 2019. On May 31, 2019, the series was renewed for a third season which premiered on April 26, 2020. On March 18, 2020, it was reported that Starz had cancelled the program and the third season would be the final season.

=== Casting ===
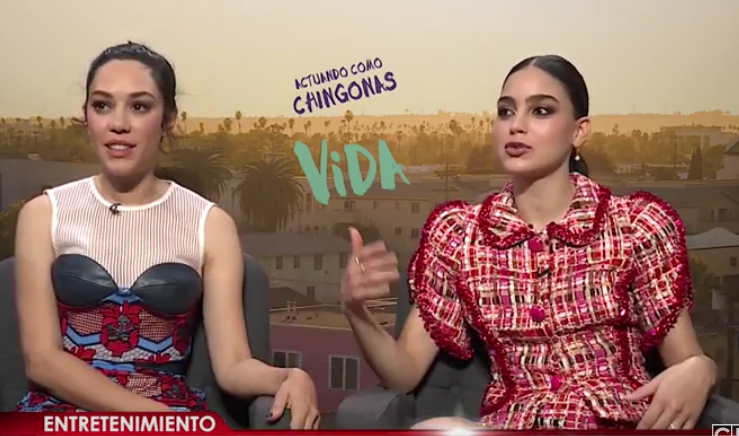
Vida co-leads Mishel Prada and Melissa Barrera in 2019

Alongside the series order announcement, it was announced that Melissa Barrera and Veronica Osorio had been cast as Lyn and Emma, respectively. On November 14, 2017, Ser Anzoategui, Chelsea Rendon, Carlos Miranda, and Maria Elena Laas were announced as having joined the series' main cast. It was also announced that Mishel Prada had replaced Veronica Osorio in the role of Emma. On December 8, 2017, the final additions to the cast were announced. These consisted of the castings of Elena Campbell-Martínez, Ramsés Jiménez, Luis Bordonada, Elizabeth De Razzo, Renee Victor, Adelina Anthony, and Erika Soto in recurring roles.

On July 28, 2018, it was announced that Roberta Colindrez had joined the main cast for season two. On August 15, 2018, it was reported that Raúl Castillo and Adrian Gonzalez had been cast in recurring roles for season two.

=== Filming ===
Principal photography for season one took place in the Pico-Union area of Los Angeles. Though the series is set in the Boyle Heights neighborhood, filming was moved to Pico-Union as residents of Boyle Heights raised concern over possible gentrification that might have been caused by the series presence.

=== Language ===
The dialogue in the series was written in Spanglish, like much of Saracho's theater work, and code switches in a way that is natural to many Hispanics, including Saracho. Though, as Saracho's background is Texan rather than Californian, members of the writers' room from Eastside Los Angeles ensured that the terms were true to the characters and not skewed by Spanglish more natural to Americans of Cuban and Puerto Rican backgrounds.

== Release ==
=== Marketing ===
The first teaser trailer was released on February 8, 2018. On March 10, Starz opened the "Starz Sensory House" at the annual South by Southwest Film Festival in Austin, Texas. The "sensory house" featured a multitude of screens playing the trailers for both new shows on a loop. Various types of food and drinks were available and designed thematically to Vida and other new Starz series Sweetbitter. In keeping with the theme of Vida, Spanish-style tapas were served throughout the event, including mini tostadas, Korean hangar steak kabobs, and bite-sized crème brûlées. Additionally, a series of six artisanal cocktails were also available, designed by Austin-based bartender Tracy Rowland. One such cocktail based on Vida included the "Chingonia", a mix of Blanco tequila, vermouth, aloe, white wine, and garnished with basil and cucumber. A musical element was also included through the all-female DJ collective Chulita Vinyl Club that performed. The Starz Sensory House was located at 88 Rainey Street in Austin and operated until March 12.

=== Premiere ===
On March 11, 2018, the series held its world premiere at the annual South by Southwest Film Festival in Austin, Texas at Austin Convention Center in the Vimeo Theater. Following the screening, Fawzia Mirza moderated a question-and-answer session with showrunner and executive producer Tanya Saracho along with cast members Melissa Barrera, Mishel Prada, Ser Anzoategui, Chelsea Rendon, Carlos Miranda, and Maria Elena Laas.

== Reception ==
=== Critical response ===
The first season received a positive response from critics upon its premiere. On the review aggregation website Rotten Tomatoes, the series holds a 100% approval rating, the first season has an average rating of 8.06 out of 10, based on 39 reviews. The website's critical consensus for season one reads, "Vida explores familiar familial ground from a fresh perspective to create an earnest and heartfelt take on identity and what it means to belong." Metacritic, which uses a weighted average, assigned the series a score of 75 out of 100 based on 12 critics, indicating "generally favorable reviews".

In a positive review, Vox's Caroline Framke awarded the series four "V"s out of five and praised the performances saying, "Every actor on Vida is great; Barrera's performance in particular blooms with searing clarity as Lyn is forced to face her own reckless choices. But it's Prada's Emma who becomes both the backbone and the beating heart of Vida as she grapples with her mother's truth and the painful reality of learning it too late." In a further approving editorial, Entertainment Weekly's Kristen Baldwin gave the series a "B" grade and commended it saying, "Vida is, remarkably, still a rarity on English-language TV: A show about Latinos made by a Latino. But the show's themes — gentrification, generational bias, and the surreal disconnect of returning to your childhood home after forging a new identity elsewhere — are universal, and Vida clips along nicely thanks to strong performances, including Chelsea Rendon's fierce and funny portrayal of guerrilla activist Marisol, and Prada's composed intensity as Emma." In a similarly enthusiastic critique, Deadline Hollywood's Dominic Patten complimented the series saying, "From its opening episode helmed by Alonso Ruizpalacios, the half-hour series also rejects barriers, slaps stereotypes silly and triumphantly spotlights several worlds you may not know that well but are vital parts of the cultural fabric of our time and country."

=== Awards and nominations ===
Year	Award	Category	Nominee(s)	Result	Ref.
2019	National Hispanic Media Coalition Impact Awards	Outstanding Television Series	Vida	Won	
2019	GLAAD Media Award	Outstanding Comedy Series	Vida	Won	
2020	GLAAD Media Award	Outstanding Comedy Series	Vida	Nominated	
2021	GLAAD Media Award	Outstanding Comedy Series	Vida	Nominated	
