= Ser Anzoategui =

American actor

Ser Anzoategui is an American actor, best known for portraying Eddy on the Starz drama Vida (2018—2020), and Daysi Cantu on East Los High (2015–2016).

== Early life ==
Anzoategui was born in Huntington Park, California, and raised in several communities around East Los Angeles. Their parents immigrated to the United States from Argentina and Paraguay. They are non-binary and use they/them pronouns.

Anzoategui attended college at Loyola Marymount University in California.

== Career ==
Anzoategui began acting in the Los Angeles theater scene. They produced, wrote, and starred in a semi-autobiographical play called Catholic School Daze, which led to wider prominence.

When Anzoategui first auditioned for scripted acting roles they were rarely cast even though they presented as femme at the time. They then began to write and perform autobiographical theater shows such as Ser and Catholic School Daze. Anzoategui was performing in theater productions when they were cast in East Los High. They portrayed Daysi Cantu, a character who is masculine of center.

They portrayed Eddy on Vida for the three seasons it ran in 2018–2020. Eddy, the sensitive, butch widow of Vidalia, attempts to protect the business she co-owned with her wife when Vida's daughters return for the funeral. Anzoategui's performance on the show has been positively received by critics. Writing for LA Weekly, Lina Lecaro stated, "Powerfully played by L.A. native and longtime local theater actor Ser Anzoategui...Eddy...is in many ways the heart of the show. She conveys a subdued depth of pain, loss and hope while trying to forge a relationship with the young women, even as conflict emerges over how to honor the wishes of the woman who brought them together.

== Accolades ==
Anzoategui was nominated for “Best Supporting Actor” for their Vida performance at the 2019 Imagen Awards.

== Filmography ==
=== Television ===
Year	Title	Role
2015–2016	East Los High	Daysi Cantu
2017	The Fosters	Correctional officer
2018–2020	Vida	Eddy
2019	Better Things	Sil
2022-present	Pinecone & Pony	Wren (voice)

=== Film ===
Year	Title	Role
2019	Sargasso	Olga
2020	Disclosure: Trans Lives on Screen	Themself
