= Own the Room =

- Film poster
- Directed by: Cristina Costantini, Darren Foster
- Produced by: Rupert Maconick, Jeffrey Plunkett, Tobias Lütke, Jason Badal, Colin McRae, Carolyn Bernstein, Carolyn Bernstein
- Cinematography: Michael Lockridge
- Edited by: Jacob Fisher, Sasha Perry
- Music by: Jeff Morrow
- Production companies: National Geographic Documentary Films; Shopify Studios
- Distributed by: Disney+
- Release date: March 12, 2021
- Running time: 91 minutes
- Country: United States
- Language: English

Own the Room is a 2021 National Geographic documentary film directed by Christina Costantini and Darren Foster, released on Disney+ on March 12, 2021. The film follows five students who compete in the Global Student Entrepreneur Awards for a grand prize of $100,000.

== Premise ==
Five students travel to Macau, to represent their countries and compete in the Global Student Entrepreneur Awards for a grand prize of $100,000. The film follows Santosh from Nepal, Alondra from Puerto Rico, Henry from Kenya, Jason from Greece, and Daniela from Venezuela. Each of the students detail their business ventures, including the challenges they have had to face to get where they are today.

== Release ==
The film premiered on Disney+ on March 12, 2021.

== Reception ==
=== Critical reception ===
Own the Room holds a 100% approval rating on review aggregator website Rotten Tomatoes, based on 8 reviews. Critic Jamie Davis describes the film as "the story of possibility, of daring to dream, of having the audacity to advocate for change even when people believe you can't or when life holds you back." According to Metacritic, which assigned it a weighted average score of 68 out of 100 based on 4 critics, the film received "generally favorable reviews".

=== Accolades ===
Year	Award	Category	Nominee(s)	Result	Ref.
2021	Imagen Foundation Awards	Best Director - Feature Film	Cristina Costantini, Darren Foster	Nominated	
2021	Imagen Foundation Awards	Best Documentary	Own the Room	Nominated	
