= Mishel Prada =

American actress (born 1989)

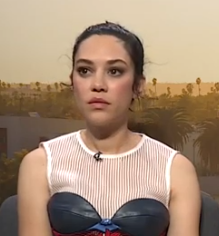
- Prada in October 2019
- Born: 1989 (age 36–37); Hialeah, Florida, U.S.
- Occupation: Actress
- Known for: Vida

Mishel Prada (born 1989) is an American actress. She is best known for portraying the lead role of Emma Hernandez on the Starz drama series Vida and as Detective KD Silva in the Peacock mini series The Continental. She previously starred in The Walking Dead spinoff web series, Fear the Walking Dead: Passage.

== Early life ==
Prada was born and raised in Hialeah, a city in the metropolitan Miami area. Through her grandparents, she is of Dominican, Mexican, Puerto Rican, and French descent. Prada's parents immigrated to the United States. She was raised speaking Spanish.

== Career ==
Prada began acting as a child, performing in church and school productions. She pursued acting professionally when she was 23. While acting in minor roles, she worked as a concierge at the Roosevelt Hotel in Los Angeles.

Her first lead role was in Fear the Walking Dead: Passage, which received a Creative Arts Emmy Award nomination. She introduced herself to Stranger Things casting director Carmen Cuba after the ceremony, and Cuba called Prada later to read for a role in the Starz drama Vida, which was in production.

Prada first auditioned for the roles of Lyn and Cruz, but was eventually offered the role of Emma, a Mexican-American woman who moves back to her gentrifying neighborhood in East Los Angeles after the death of her mother. Vida debuted in May 2018 and the second season premiered on May 23, 2019.

She is a founding member of a female art collective called Damarosa, which looks at the artistic work of influential women in literature.

She portrayed Hermosa Lodge on season four of The CW teen series, Riverdale.

== Filmography ==
=== Film ===
Year	Title	Role	Notes
2013	Eat Spirit Eat	Ana	
2015	There Is A New World Somewhere	Angela	
2015	Benjamin Troubles	Nova	
2016	Tell Me How I Die	Nurse Rivera	
2017	The Two Dogs	Gina Good	
2018	Bachelor Lions	Charlotte	
2021	A Place in the Field	Jessica Garza	
2021	Let's Get Merried		TV movie
2025	Stone Cold Fox	Frankie	

=== Television ===
Year	Title	Role	Notes
2016–2017	Fear the Walking Dead: Passage	Gabi	Main role; TV mini-series
2018	Corporate	Focus Group Protestor #1	1 episode
2018–2020	Vida	Emma	Main role
2019–2022	Riverdale	Hermosa Lodge	Recurring role (season 4), guest (season 5-6); 11 episodes
2023	The Continental: From the World of John Wick	KD	Miniseries
2024–Present	Brilliant Minds	Katie Rodríguez	Recurring role
