= Dynasty (1981 TV series) season 7 =

US television series

Dynasty
- Season 7
- No. of episodes: 28

Release
- Original network: ABC
- Original release: September 24, 1986 – May 6, 1987

Season chronology
- ← Previous; Season 6 Next → Season 8

The seventh season of Dynasty originally aired in the United States on ABC from September 24, 1986, through May 5, 1987. The series, created by Richard and Esther Shapiro and produced by Aaron Spelling, revolves around the Carringtons, a wealthy family residing in Denver, Colorado.

Season seven stars John Forsythe as millionaire oil magnate Blake Carrington; Linda Evans as his wife Krystle; Jack Coleman as Blake and Alexis' earnest son Steven; Gordon Thomson as Blake and Alexis' eldest son Adam; Heather Locklear as Krystle's niece and Steven's ex-wife Sammy Jo; Michael Nader as Alexis' husband Dex Dexter; Karen Cellini as Blake and Alexis' youngest daughter, Amanda; Diahann Carroll as Blake's half-sister Dominique Deveraux; Wayne Northrop as Blake's former chauffeur Michael Culhane; Ted McGinley as Clay Fallmont; and Joan Collins as Alexis Colby, Blake's ex-wife and the mother of Adam, Fallon, Steven and Amanda. The season also features Christopher Cazenove as Blake's brother, Ben Carrington; Kate O'Mara as Alexis' sister Caress Morell; Terri Garber as Ben's daughter Leslie; Leann Hunley as Blake's secretary Dana Waring; and Cassie Yates as Sarah Curtis and old friend of Dex's. Though starring as Jeff Colby and Fallon Carrington on The Colbys, John James and Emma Samms each appeared in two episodes of season seven as these characters.

== Development ==
Although the first episode of season seven, "The Victory", premiered with a high Nielsen rating of a 20.1, it was overtaken by Magnum, P.I., now in the same time slot on CBS. Dynasty ultimately fell to #24 in the United States for the season.

During the period between the production of seasons six and seven, Catherine Oxenberg vacated the role of Amanda Carrington, purportedly due to a salary dispute. Oxenberg's publicist insisted that the actress left Dynasty voluntarily, while several media outlets reported that she was fired. The role was immediately recast with Karen Cellini, who appeared for 13 episodes of the series' seventh season before the character was written out in the 1987 episode "The Rig".

== Plot ==
As the seventh season begins, Blake stops short of killing Alexis, who has taken all of his assets, including the mansion. Claudia has died in the fire she set at La Mirage, and Amanda (now played by Karen Cellini) is rescued by a returning Michael Culhane, Blake's chauffeur from the first season. Blake turns the tables on Ben and Alexis and recovers his wealth, but loses his memory after an oil rig explosion. Alexis finds Blake and, with everyone believing he is dead, perpetuates the belief that they are still married. Living with a clean slate, Alexis finds herself softening to Blake but ultimately tells him the truth as he reunites with Krystle. Krystina receives a heart transplant but is later temporarily kidnapped by Sarah Curtis, the mother of the girl from whom Krystina received her new heart; Sammy Jo's marriage to Clay crumbles and she falls into bed with Steven; Amanda leaves town; and Ben's daughter Leslie arrives. Adam's season-long romance with Blake's secretary Dana Waring culminates in a wedding, which is punctuated in the May 6, 1987 season finale by a car Alexis drove plunged off a bridge into a river and the violent return of a vengeful Matthew Blaisdel (Bo Hopkins).

== Cast ==
=== Main ===
- John Forsythe as Blake Carrington
- Linda Evans as Krystle Carrington
- John James as Jeff Colby (Note: James appears only in "Romance" (ep. 7.6) and "The Test" (ep. 7.18).)
- Gordon Thomson as Adam Carrington
- Emma Samms as Fallon Carrington Colby (Note: Samms appears only in "The Victory" (ep. 7.1) and "Romance" (ep. 7.6).)
- Jack Coleman as Steven Carrington
- Michael Nader as Dex Dexter
- Heather Locklear as Sammy Jo Carrington
- Ted McGinley as Clay Fallmont (Note: McGinley, Cazenove, Northrop and Caroll appear on a semi-regular basis, missing the occasional episode. Northrop departs officially in "The Sublet" (ep. 7.25).)
- Terri Garber as Leslie Carrington (Note: Garber is added to the opening credits from "The Rig" (ep. 7.13), although she does not appear in "A Love Remembered" (ep. 7.14 & 7.15).)
- Cassie Yates as Sarah Curtis (Note: Yates is added to the opening credits from "The Mothers" (ep. 7.19) to "The Affair" (ep. 7.27).)
- Leann Hunley as Dana Waring (Note: Hunley first appears in a recurring role from "Reward" (ep. 7.4) before being added to the opening credits from "The Surgery" (ep. 7.20).)
- Christopher Cazenove as Ben Carrington
- Karen Cellini as Amanda Carrington (Note: Cellini departs in "The Rig" (ep. 7.13).)
- Wayne Northrop as Michael Culhane
- Kate O'Mara as Caress Morell (Note: O'Mara appears in the opening credits from "The Mission" (ep. 7.7) to "The Letter" (ep. 7.10).)
- Diahann Carroll as Dominique Deveraux
- Ricardo Montalbán as Zach Powers (Note: Montalban is added to the opening credits for "The Choice" (ep. 7.8) only, credited as "special guest star".)
- Joan Collins as Alexis Carrington

=== Recurring ===
- William Beckley as Gerard
- Virginia Hawkins as Jeanette Robbins
- Richard Lawson as Nick Kimball
- Paul Burke as Neal McVane
- James Sutorious as Gordon Wales
- Betty Harford as Hilda Gunnerson
- Richard Anderson as Buck Fallmont
- Troy Beyer as Jackie Deveraux
- Patricia Crowley as Emily Fallmont
- Kimberly Beck as Claire Prentice
- Jon Cypher as Dirk Maurier
- Alan Fudge as Phil Thorpe
- Neil Dickson as Gavin Maurier

=== Notable guest stars ===
- Clyde Kusatsu as Dr. Chen
- Linda Thorson as Dr. Mansfield
- Bo Hopkins as Matthew Blaisdel

Cast notes

== Episodes ==
Season two of The Colbys aired concurrently with Dynasty season seven.

No. overall	No. in season	Title	Directed by	Written by	Original release date	Prod. code	Rating/share (households)
149	1	"The Victory"	Don Medford	Story by : Laurence Heath; Teleplay by : Edward De Blasio	September 24, 1986	DY-146	20.1/31
Blake's former chauffeur, Michael Culhane, returns and rescues Amanda, now played by Karen Cellini, from the fire at La Mirage, but the hotel is destroyed and Claudia dies in the blaze. After throwing Blake and Krystle out of the Carrington mansion, Alexis and Ben move in. Adam is devastated by the news of Claudia's death. Dominique calls off her wedding to Garrett. A grieving man who lost his wife in the fire accuses Blake of murdering her and, having recently bought a newspaper, Alexis puts the story all over the front page.
150	2	"Sideswiped"	Gwen Arner	Story by : Laurence Heath; Teleplay by : Edward De Blasio	October 1, 1986	DY-147	18.7/29
At Amanda's urging, Blake grudgingly rehires Michael as his chauffeur. Blake goes to the Denver Mirror to confront the publisher over the headlines being printed about him and is shocked to find that Alexis is the publisher; Blake is further annoyed when Alexis tells him that she plans to use the newspaper to paint him as an arsonist out for insurance money. Steven tells Adam that he is leaving ColbyCo and that he wants to work together with Adam to help Blake rebuild his empire; Adam reluctantly agrees, but immediately goes to Alexis and accepts the position with ColbyCo that she offers him. After purchasing the final amount of required stock, Alexis gains controlling interest in Denver-Carrington. Blake, Krystle and Michael are in a car accident, when Phil Thorpe, the man who accused Blake of killing his wife runs Blake's limo off the road.
151	3	"Focus"	Don Medford	Story by : Laurence Heath; Teleplay by : James W. Kearns	October 22, 1986	DY-148	17.8/26
Krystle is rushed to the hospital with life-threatening injuries after the crash. Blaming Alexis for indirectly causing the crash, Blake threatens to finish strangling her if anything happens to Krystle. Dominique offers financial help to Blake. Alexis puts pressure on the district attorney to charge Blake with arson. Thorpe pulls a gun on Krystle in her hotel room, but she manages to talk him down. Dynasty was preempted by Game 2 of the 1986 American League Championship Series on October 8, 1986, and by the final Game on October 15, 1986.
152	4	"Reward"	Irving J. Moore	Story by : Laurence Heath; Teleplay by : Harold Stone	October 29, 1986	DY-149	17.0/27
Alexis goes into full force with her smear campaign against Blake, who becomes convinced that the land he inherited from his mother holds the key to regaining his empire. Michael continues his manipulation of Amanda to get revenge on Blake. Adam and Ben are at odds. Blake is arrested on charges of murder and arson. Leann Hunley makes her first appearance as Dana Waring.
153	5	"The Arraignment"	Georg Stanford Brown	Story by : Laurence Heath; Teleplay by : Dennis Turner	November 5, 1986	DY-150	16.7/25
Alexis realizes that Ben is also plotting against Blake in the La Mirage arson case. Krystle begins experiencing poor health, but ignores her doctor's requests. Dominique and Krystle learn from Jackie that the fire started in Claudia's room, leading to Blake's exoneration. Alexis and Dex reunite. Caress contacted Blake for help by sending him a letter.
154	6	"Romance"	Nancy Malone	Story by : Laurence Heath; Teleplay by : Mart Crowley	November 12, 1986	DY-151	16.2/24
Ben discovers that Caress contacted Blake for help, and sets a plan into action to block her freedom. Alexis has finally tired of Ben's antics and severs all ties with him. He immediately vows to make her pay.
155	7	"The Mission"	Don Medford	Story by : Laurence Heath; Teleplay by : Edward De Blasio	November 19, 1986	DY-152	15.6/24
With help from Clay Fallmont, Dex and Blake free Caress from prison in Caracas and bring her back to Denver.
156	8	"The Choice"	Irving J. Moore	Story by : Laurence Heath; Teleplay by : Harold Stone	November 26, 1986	DY-153	15.9/26
Caress turns the tables and begins a malicious plot for revenge against Alexis and Ben. Sammy Jo tells Clay that he is going to be a father, but she does not get the response she hoped for. Michael is in cahoots with Carrington enemy, Zach Powers. Blind to Michael's cunning ways, Amanda moves in with him.
157	9	"The Secret"	Don Medford	Story by : Laurence Heath; Teleplay by : Dennis Turner	December 3, 1986	DY-154	16.7/26
Even after an attempt on her life, Caress continues to carry out her plans for revenge. Alexis has Michael investigated and when Alexis confronts Michael, in front of Amanda, with some of his former shady dealings, Amanda dumps Michael, but he quickly convinces her to take him back. Clay tells Sammy Jo that he wants to marry her. Emily tells Buck of her affair with Ben and sets out to leave Denver, but before that she leaves a letter for Blake at the reception, and after that, she is struck by a car.
158	10	"The Letter"	Georg Stanford Brown	Story by : Laurence Heath; Teleplay by : Edward De Blasio	December 10, 1986	DY-155	17.2/27
A dying Emily Fallmont gives Blake a letter that will clear his name and expose Alexis and Ben of all their schemes. Sammy Jo and Clay get married in Las Vegas. After Alexis makes threats to expose him, Michael confesses and finds himself out of favor with Blake. Upon leaving Denver, Caress makes peace with Alexis and warns her about the sinister Ben.
159	11	"The Ball"	Nancy Malone	Story by : Laurence Heath; Teleplay by : Edward De Blasio	December 17, 1986	DY-156	16.7/25
Sammy Jo's doctor informs her that she is not pregnant after all; afraid that she will lose Clay, she does not tell him. Armed with concrete proof, including Emily Fallmont's letter, that Alexis and Ben perjured themselves on the witness stand, Blake forces Alexis to return the mansion, Denver-Carrington and the South China Sea leases to him.
160	12	"Fear"	Michel Hugo	Story by : Laurence Heath; Teleplay by : Dennis Turner	December 31, 1986	DY-157	13.7/26
Blake and Krystle move back into the mansion. After having too much to drink the previous night, Steven awakens to find an unexpected person in his bed. Michael approaches Alexis with a business proposition; Alexis agrees, but only on the condition that Michael sues Blake for $50 million due to Blake shutting down the crater project. Adam and Dana get into an argument when Dana tells Adam that she is going back to work for Blake as his assistant. After Alexis has her music critic write a scathing review of Dominique, Dominique and Alexis have a heated confrontation. When Ben attempts to use Alexis's fear of being sent back to prison against her, Alexis instructs Adam to go to Australia to find something to neutralize Ben. Dynasty was preempted by a repeat of the 1984 ABC Wednesday Night Movie The Night They Saved Christmas on December 24, 1986.
161	13	"The Rig"	Irving J. Moore	Story by : Laurence Heath; Teleplay by : Harold Stone	January 7, 1987	DY-158	18.4/27
Blake rejects Ben's request for reconciliation, reminding him that Ben was not interested in being brothers when Blake was the one that was down; Ben responds by threatening Blake. In Australia, not only does Adam find the necessary information to use against Ben, he also finds Ben's long-lost daughter, Leslie Carrington. Blake, Alexis and Ben go to Hong Kong to complete the transfer of the South China Sea leases back to Blake. Sammy Jo struggles over her decision to keep the fact that she is not pregnant from Clay. Michael takes Amanda to a lake for a vacation, but while there they argue when she discovers that Michael is suing Blake. Amanda goes on a sailing trip with Michael and finds out about his schemes from Steven. She leaves Denver for London. Blake and Ben are in an oil rig explosion, and seeking final vengeance, Ben considers leaving Blake for dead.
162	14	"A Love Remembered - Part 1"	Robert Scheerer	Story by : Laurence Heath; Teleplay by : Edward De Blasio	January 14, 1987	DY-159	18.5/27
Ben saves Blake from the oil rig explosion. At the hospital, Blake wakes up believing it is 1964 and Alexis decides to take advantage of Blake's memory loss by feigning a picture of them as a happily married couple. When Sammy Jo has an accident at the ranch, Clay learns that she was never pregnant.
163	15	"A Love Remembered - Part 2"	Irving J. Moore	Story by : Laurence Heath; Teleplay by : Edward De Blasio	January 21, 1987	DY-160	19.6/28
Krystle and Dex arrive in Singapore to search for Blake and Alexis. Meanwhile back in Denver, Sammy Jo and Steven grow closer over their troubling situations. Pretending to be Mrs. Blake Carrington, Alexis begins to get caught up in her charade, but following an attack of conscience, Alexis reveals her deceitfulness to Blake and he reunites with Krystle.
164	16	"The Portrait"	Nancy Malone	Story by : Laurence Heath; Teleplay by : Edward De Blasio & Joanna Emerson	January 28, 1987	DY-161	18.9/28
Back in Denver, Krystle is dismayed by the continued closeness she observes between Blake and Alexis. The family learns that Amanda has left town. Steven and Clay get into a fight over Sammy Jo. Leslie arrives in Denver and has a rocky reunion with her father, Ben.
165	17	"The Birthday"	Robert Scheerer	Story by : Laurence Heath; Teleplay by : Dennis Turner	February 4, 1987	DY-162	18.2/28
While Clay and Sammy Jo are ending their brief marriage, Adam announces his engagement to Dana Waring. Both announcements please Alexis, who then goes into overdrive planning the wedding. Dex decides to leave Alexis and ends up in the arms of Dominique. Krystina collapses and is taken to the hospital.
166	18	"The Test"	Nancy Malone	Story by : Laurence Heath; Teleplay by : Dennis Turner	February 11, 1987	DY-163	17.8/26
Michael presents Alexis with a new offer, but she is hesitant to accept. When Alexis comes to the hospital in support of Krystina, she is shunned by Krystle. Leslie accepts Krystle's invitation to move into the Carrington mansion. Clay is annoyed when he learns that Sammy Jo has asked Steven and Danny to move in with her. Blake and Krystle learn that Krystina's condition is fatal and she will need a heart transplant to survive.
167	19	"The Mothers"	Irving J. Moore	Story by : Laurence Heath & Rita Lakin; Teleplay by : Edward De Blasio	February 25, 1987	DY-164	16.9/25
Krystina is transferred to a hospital in California to await a heart transplant. Dex takes Dominique to Wyoming where Dex is reunited with childhood friends, Sarah and Boyd Curtis, who are later in a car accident along with their young daughter; Sarah survives, but Boyd is killed and their daughter is left brain dead. Prior to being released from prison, former congressman, Neal McVane is given interesting information concerning Adam and he later shocks Adam by telling him that the real Adam Carrington died as a baby and that he is an imposter. With Leslie living in the Carrington mansion, Ben seizes the chance to try to reconcile with his daughter. Sarah Curtis agrees to donate her daughter's heart to Krystina. Dynasty was preempted by Part 4 of Amerika on February 18, 1987.
168	20	"The Surgery"	Gwen Arner	Story by : Laurence Heath & Rita Lakin; Teleplay by : Frank V. Furino	March 4, 1987	DY-165	13.7/21
Unwilling to give up on her daughter, Sarah nearly backs out of the surgery; a talk with Dex changes her mind and after a brief delay, Krystina has the heart transplant. After Neil McVane provides him with evidence that he is not, in fact, the Adam Carrington, Adam questions Alexis about the kidnapping. Following an unpleasant first encounter, neither Clay nor Leslie is happy when Dex offers Leslie a job as Clay's assistant.
169	21	"The Garage"	Don Medford	Story by : Laurence Heath & Rita Lakin; Teleplay by : Edward De Blasio	March 11, 1987	DY-166	16.5/25
Krystle and Blake return to Denver with Krystina. Adam is unnerved at the notion that he may not be a Carrington after all. After a despondent Sarah attempts suicide, Krystle invites Sarah to move into the mansion, which makes Blake uneasy. Ben is apprehensive when Leslie tells him she is going out to dinner with Clay. Sammy Jo tries, unsuccessfully, to seduce Steven. Alexis is surprised to see McVane.
170	22	"The Shower"	Irving J. Moore	Story by : Laurence Heath & Rita Lakin; Teleplay by : Joanna Emerson	March 18, 1987	DY-167	16.8/26
Dana, Alexis and Steven try to figure out what is causing Adam's strange and unpredictable behavior. After he is shunned by Alexis, Michael gets into the revenge business with Neil. Both Blake and Dex begin to realize the attachment that Sarah is developing to Krystina, but Krystle remains oblivious and names Sarah as Krystina's new caretaker.
171	23	"The Dress"	Gwen Arner	Story by : Laurence Heath & Rita Lakin; Teleplay by : Frank V. Furino	March 25, 1987	DY-168	18.6/29
Suspicions about Adam continue to grow after he calls off the wedding, leaving Dana crushed. Buck Fallmont berates Clay over his involvement with Leslie, who questions Ben about his relationship to the Fallmonts. Sarah overhears Blake voicing his concern over her increasing attachment to Krystina and she decides to leave the mansion; however, Krystle convinces her to stay. Steven and Sammy Jo continue to grow closer.
172	24	"Valez"	Nancy Malone	Story by : Laurence Heath & Rita Lakin; Teleplay by : Dennis Turner	April 1, 1987	DY-169	16.3/25
After making love, Sammy Jo is hurt when Steven tells her that it was a mistake and that they can never be more than friends. Dex tries to warn Alexis about her new business partner, Dirk Maurier. Having finally become aware of Sarah's unhealthy attachment to Krystina, Krystle asks Sarah to leave the mansion; she does—and takes Krystina with her.
173	25	"The Sublet"	Don Medford	Story by : Laurence Heath & Rita Lakin; Teleplay by : Edward De Blasio	April 8, 1987	DY-170	17.4/28
A kidnapped Krystina is terrified while being held captive by an unstable Sarah, who has convinced herself that Krystina is her own deceased daughter, Cathy. Dominique receives a marriage proposal from Nick. McVane forces Adam to give him information which will cause Alexis to lose millions on a business deal and the guilt over betraying his mother sends Adam into a downward spiral.
174	26	"The Confession"	Irving J. Moore	Story by : Laurence Heath & Rita Lakin; Teleplay by : A.J. Russel	April 22, 1987	DY-171	16.9/27
Once Krystina is reunited with the family, Blake and Krystle drop the kidnapping charges against Sarah, on the condition that she receive mental treatment. When the guilt over keeping his secret gets to be too much for him, Adam finally confesses his true identity to Blake and Alexis. Adam and Dana decide to give their love another chance and decide to leave Denver. Dirk Maurier's nephew, Gavin, arrives in Denver and takes an immediate interest in Alexis. Dynasty was preempted by Spenser: For Hire on April 15, 1987.
175	27	"The Affair"	Don Medford	Story by : Laurence Heath & Rita Lakin; Teleplay by : Frank V. Furino	April 29, 1987	DY-172	16.8/27
Buck Fallmont approaches Blake and asks him to get Clay and Leslie to stop seeing each other. When Blake refuses to get involved, Buck tells him that Clay is not his son, he is Ben's. Jackie returns to Denver with plans of reuniting her parents; confronting Nick, she demands that he stay away from Dominique. With Krystle's help, Sarah finally accepts that her daughter is dead. Leslie is devastated at the news that she and Clay may be half-siblings and takes her anger out on Ben. Gavin takes Alexis out for a night on the town.
176	28	"Shadow Play"	Irving J. Moore	Story by : Laurence Heath & Rita Lakin; Teleplay by : Edward De Blasio	May 6, 1987	DY-173	17.6/29
Blake and Alexis surprise Adam with adoption papers prior to his wedding. Both Clay Fallmont and Ben Carrington decide to leave Denver, amid scandal about Clay's paternity. Dominique finally accepts Nick's proposal. Dex and Gavin fight over Alexis and later, after Dex angrily tells Alexis that her life is empty, an emotional Alexis accidentally drives her car off a bridge. Following the wedding, the entire Carrington family is held hostage at the mansion by a face from the past: Matthew Blaisdel.

== Reception ==
In season seven, Dynasty was ranked #24 in the United States with a 17.2 Nielsen rating.
