= Dynasty (1981 TV series) season 8 =

Dynasty
- Season 8
- No. of episodes: 22

Release
- Original network: ABC
- Original release: September 23, 1987 – March 30, 1988

Season chronology
- ← Previous; Season 7 Next → Season 9

The eighth season of Dynasty originally aired in the United States on ABC from September 23, 1987, through March 30, 1988. The series, created by Richard and Esther Shapiro and produced by Aaron Spelling, revolves around the Carringtons, a wealthy family residing in Denver, Colorado.

Season eight stars John Forsythe as millionaire oil magnate Blake Carrington; Linda Evans as his wife Krystle; Jack Coleman as Blake and Alexis' earnest son Steven; Gordon Thomson as Blake and Alexis' eldest son Adam; Emma Samms as Blake and Alexis' daughter Fallon; John James as Fallon's ex-husband Jeff Colby; Leann Hunley as Adam's wife Dana Waring; Heather Locklear as Krystle's niece and Steven's ex-wife Sammy Jo; Michael Nader as Alexis' ex-husband Dex Dexter; James Healey as Alexis' mysterious new husband Sean Rowan; Terri Garber as Blake's niece Leslie Carrington; and Joan Collins as Alexis Colby, Blake's ex-wife and the mother of Adam, Fallon, Steven and Amanda.

== Development ==
With The Colbys cancelled, John James and Emma Samms returned as Jeff and Fallon for Dynasty's eighth season. By the end of the season, Dynasty had dropped out of the top 30, and was ranked #41 in the United States. The season finale episode "Colorado Roulette" was the last episode of the series to air on a Wednesday, and the show moved to Thursdays for season nine.

== Plot ==
Jeff and Fallon return to Denver, their marriage falling apart again. Matthew, returned from the dead but troubled by headaches, holds the Carringtons hostage in hopes that Krystle will run away with him. Steven ends the siege by reluctantly stabbing his old friend to death. Alexis, whose car plunged into a river at the end of season seven, is saved by a handsome, mysterious stranger, Sean Rowan. She later marries him, not realizing that he is the son of deceased Carrington majordomo Joseph Anders, bent on revenge on behalf of his father and sister, Kirby. Steven and Sammy Jo's reconciliation is short-lived, and the pursuit of a child unravels Adam and Dana's marriage. Sean begins to manipulate and destroy the Carringtons from the inside, and he fights Dex to the death in the March 30, 1988 season finale. Blake, who failed being elected as governor of Colorado, comes home to find Krystle missing and their bedroom in shambles.

== Cast ==
=== Main ===
- John Forsythe as Blake Carrington
- Linda Evans as Krystle Carrington
- John James as Jeff Colby
- Gordon Thomson as Adam Carrington
- Jack Coleman as Steven Carrington
- Michael Nader as Dex Dexter
- Heather Locklear as Sammy Jo Carrington
- Emma Samms as Fallon Carrington Colby
- Terri Garber as Leslie Carrington
- Leann Hunley as Dana Waring
- James Healey as Sean Rowan
- Bo Hopkins as Matthew Blaisdel (Note: Hopkins is credited in "The Siege" (ep. 8.1 & 8.2) as "special guest star".)
- Joan Collins as Alexis Carrington

=== Recurring ===
- Stephanie Dunnam as Karen Atkinson
- William Beckley as Gerard
- Tom Schanley as Josh Harris
- Christopher Allport as Jesse Atkinson
- Virginia Hawkins as Jeanette Robbins
- Daniel Davis as Harry Thresher
- Hank Brandt as Morgan Hess

=== Notable guest stars ===
- Betty Harford as Hilda Gunnerson
- Grant Goodeve as Chris Deegan
- Paul Burke as Neal McVane
- James Sutorious as Gordon Wales

Cast notes

== Episodes ==
No. overall	No. in season	Title	Directed by	Written by	Original release date	Prod. code	Rating/share (households)
177	1	"The Siege - Part 1"	Don Medford	Edward De Blasio	September 23, 1987	DY-174	16.5/28
Still held captive by the deranged Matthew Blaisdel, Blake and his family wait helplessly as Blaisdel's obsession for Krystle grows dangerously stronger. Witnessing Alexis's car drive off the bridge, a handsome and mysterious stranger rescues her from the river below. Jeff searches for Fallon after her car is found abandoned in the desert and finds her unconscious by the side of the road several miles away. Allowed to leave the mansion to secure a fortune in cash for Blaisdel's trip back to Peru, Blake overpowers his guard and goes for help. Protecting Leslie after she tries to escape, Dex lunges at Matthew. In the ensuing fight, Dex finds an opportunity to run out the door and across the grounds for help. Blaisdel's accomplice steadies his gun and shoots, dropping Dex. Returning to the mansion, with a SWAT team covering him, Blake is terrified to find the mansion empty, except for the shredded remains of Krystina's doll.
178	2	"The Siege - Part 2"	Don Medford	Edward De Blasio	September 30, 1987	DY-175	15.2/26
Matthew takes the hostages to his old oilrig, Lankershim-Blaisdel 1, and keeps them in the house there. Dex is brought to the hospital with serious injuries, but following surgery he is able to give the police a lead as to the whereabouts of the hostages. Alexis hires Morgan Hess to investigate the man who saved her. Fallon wakes up in the hospital, but does not dare to tell Jeff about the abduction and later decides that she wants to take a trip home to Denver. Matthew buys explosives and makes a bomb for his hostages. Dana is frightened when Adam tells her that he wants them to have a baby soon. Gerard tells Jeanette that he loves her. Using Dex's tip, the police locate Matthew and kill all of his henchmen; Matthew releases all of the hostages except for Krystle and Blake. Steven rushes into the building and Matthew activates the bomb, intending to kill everybody. In the end, Steven kills Matthew with a knife while Blake disarms the bomb.
179	3	"The Aftermath"	Irving J. Moore	Story by : Jeff Ryder & Frank V. Furino; Teleplay by : Frank V. Furino	October 7, 1987	DY-176	15.4/26
The incident in the bunkhouse leaves Steven emotionally scarred. Adam is suspicious of Jeff and Fallon's motive for returning to Denver. Adam is suspicious when Dana keeps changing the subject when it comes to having children. Steven tells Sammy Jo that he will move back in with her, but only if she can accept that they will never be a couple. Fallon confesses her experience to a skeptical Jeff. Blake accepts an offer to be a candidate in Colorado's gubernatorial race. Alexis tracks down her mystery rescuer.
180	4	"The Announcement"	Don Medford	Story by : Jeff Ryder & Frank V. Furino; Teleplay by : Frank V. Furino	October 14, 1987	DY-177	15.2/26
Sean Rowan, Alexis's rescuer, carefully studies an old news clip of the Ted Dinard murder trial. Sammy Jo is saddened by the realization that her and Steven's relationship will never have the closeness she has longed for. Fallon tells Steven about her desert encounter. Things heat up between Dex and Leslie as well as Alexis and Sean. Alexis's anger over being snubbed in favor of Blake as a gubernatorial candidate reignites the Alexis-Blake feud. Believing that providing Blake with a grandchild will secure his place in the family, Adam is heartbroken when he learns that Dana is unable to have children.
181	5	"The Surrogate - Part 1"	Nancy Malone	James Harmon Brown & Barbara Esensten	October 28, 1987	DY-178	13.8/25
Alexis offers Sean a job after he informs her of his decision to leave Denver. Jeff accepts Blake's request to be his campaign manager and later, when Jeff is detained at Blake's fundraiser, he cancels his and Fallon's reconciliation dinner further weakening their fragile marriage. Alexis commits Colbyco to fight Blake's proposal of saving valuable timberland as a national park, depriving her of a resource for her newspaper. Steven asks Blake to sell him the Denver Monarchs football team and Sammy Jo is immediately attracted to the roguish quarterback, Josh Harris. Tormented by Adam's desire to have children, Dana is filled with renewed hope after learning of the successes of surrogate mothers. Dynasty was preempted by the fourth game of the 1987 World Series on October 21, 1987.
182	6	"The Surrogate - Part 2"	Don Medford	Barbara Esensten & James Harmon Brown	November 4, 1987	DY-179	14.9/26
Alexis uses her newspaper to counter Blake's land conservation proposal, by claiming the land could be better used to create jobs for her paper mill. Dana meets with a lawyer regarding the possibility of surrogacy; Adam is initially skeptical of having a stranger carry his child, but he changes his mind when he meets the surrogate, the beautiful Karen Atkinson. When working for Dex does not fulfill all of Leslie's ambitions, she accepts Alexis's job proposition. Jeff's position as Blake's campaign manager continues to occupy his time, preventing he and Fallon from fixing the problems with their marriage. Steven is upset when he sees Sammy Jo kissing Josh.
183	7	"The Primary"	Irving J. Moore	Story by : Jeff Ryder; Teleplay by : Edward De Blasio	November 18, 1987	DY-180	13.4/24
Sean whisks Alexis off to a remote cabin on the Pacific coast of Mexico where he asks her to marry him. Reacting to Steven's indifference and preoccupation with business, Sammy Jo gives in to Josh's passionate advances. Attending a support group for those who have encountered space aliens, Jeff finds the discussion too unbelievable and leaves without Fallon. Leslie offers Jeff a good luck kiss before the primary elections, as Fallon and Dex observe the moment with hurt feelings. Adam is overjoyed to learn Karen is pregnant with his child, but Dana confesses to Karen that she feels left out; Karen manages to assuage Dana's fears, but they return when Adam brings home a gift, not for Dana, but for Karen. At Blake's election victory party, a jubilant Adam informs Blake he will have another grandchild while Dana can only force her brightest smile, covering her emotional pain. Dynasty was preempted by part two of the ABC miniseries Napoleon and Josephine: A Love Story on November 11, 1987, which co-starred Stephanie Beacham from the show's spin-off series The Colbys.
184	8	"The Testing"	Don Medford	Story by : Jeff Ryder; Teleplay by : Edward De Blasio	November 25, 1987	DY-181	13.3/25
Forced to divest interests in Denver-Carrington to avoid conflict with his political career, Blake struggles to decide who in the family will assume power, but after witnessing Steven's decisiveness in handling a business situation, he asks him to run Denver-Carrington. Leslie takes advantage of a disagreement between Jeff and Fallon and makes her move on Jeff. Sammy Jo lies to Steven regarding the extent of her relationship with Josh, who, unknown to Sammy Jo, is dealing with a cocaine addiction. Sean vows to avenge the suicide of his father, Joseph Anders, and the rape of his sister, Kirby; he blames Alexis for his father's death, and promises to crush her and her family by using his influence on her to turn the family against themselves.
185	9	"The Setup"	Harry Falk	James Harmon Brown & Barbara Esensten	December 2, 1987	DY-182	14.9/26
Dana reluctantly reveals to Alexis that her infertility is due to a botched abortion many years before. Suspecting Dana is manipulating Adam to selfishly benefit her own future, Alexis schemes to prevent Dana from legally becoming the mother of Adam's surrogate child. Seeking to undermine Steven's position of power at Denver-Carrington, Adam anonymously informs the press of Skip Maitland's arrest for dealing drugs to players on Steven's football team. This sets off a scandal linked to Blake's campaign. Returning from New York guilt stricken by his weekend affair with Leslie, Jeff hopes to work out his problems with Fallon. But when Fallon walks in on Leslie and Jeff innocently finishing business matters, she is convinced their marriage is over. Concerned by his poor playing performance, Steven requests Josh Harris have a physical. Fearing his drug use will be detected, Josh quits the team. After Alexis informs Sean of Dana's ill-fated abortion, he develops a strategy to use Dana to his advantage. Flying to Billings, Montana, Sean meets with a schoolmate of Dana's, discovering the father of her aborted child was Adam. Alexis invites Krystle and Blake to an Olde English Fair to benefit Krystle's drug rehabilitation program. Expecting a turnout of influential people affecting Blake's campaign, Alexis prepares a special surprise to hinder his political goals.
186	10	"The Fair"	Don Medford	Barbara Esensten & James Harmon Brown	December 9, 1987	DY-183	15.7/28
Knowing the truth about her abortion, Sean blackmails Dana demanding she gather secret information on the Carringtons. Josh reverts to his alcohol and drug addiction after Sammy Jo turns down his marriage proposal. Fallon informs Jeff of her decision to file for a divorce. Alexis and Sean orchestrate a very public airing of a spliced video which appears to show Blake frequenting a brothel.
187	11	"The New Moguls"	Irving J. Moore	Story by : Jeff Ryder; Teleplay by : Frank V. Furino	December 23, 1987	DY-184	11.7/22
With Krystle's help, Blake manages to clear his name in the video tape scandal. On a business trip to West Africa, Dex stumbles upon a man who may be able to give him answers regarding Sean Rowan. Jeff agrees to Fallon's request for a divorce. Concerned when she cannot get a hold of Josh, Sammy Jo goes to his apartment and finds Josh unconscious from a drug overdose. Dynasty was preempted by the 1966 TV Special ABC Stage 67: A Christmas Memory on December 16, 1987.
188	12	"The Spoiler"	Nancy Malone	Story by : Jeff Ryder; Teleplay by : Frank V. Furino	December 30, 1987	DY-185	13.5/23
Sammy Jo is overwhelmed with guilt following Josh's death and realizing her obsession to be with Steven is depriving her of an intimate relationship, she asks Steven to move out of the ranch. Dana gives in to Sean's blackmail and provides him with information regarding Denver-Carrington. With Alexis preoccupied by Blake's campaign, Sean turns his attention to Leslie and they spend the night together. Jeff asks Sammy Jo to accompany Danny, L.B., and him on a weekend skiing trip. Discovering a new angle for destroying Blake's campaign, Alexis calls a late night press conference to declare herself an independent candidate for governor.
189	13	"The Interview"	Don Medford	Story by : Jeff Ryder; Teleplay by : Edward De Blasio	January 6, 1988	DY-186	13.2/22
Alexis asks Sean to assume control of Colbyco so she can concentrate on the election. At the mountain cabin with Jeff and the kids, Sammy Jo contemplates her failed marriage and her inadequacies as a mother; Jeff comforts Sammy Jo and a new bond forms between them. Dana finally tells Adam that he was the father of the child she aborted and he angrily accuses her of murdering his child. Alexis sabotages Blake's appearance at a televised debate and then shows up to steal his thunder; however, Krystle fills in for Blake and capably defends him against Alexis's political insults. Trying to think of a way to get back at Alexis, Krystle remembers Alexis's hasty marriage to Cecil Colby before he died and wonders if she can prove that he did not die from natural causes and somehow implicate Alexis.
190	14	"Images"	Harry Falk	Story by : Jeff Ryder; Teleplay by : Edward De Blasio	January 13, 1988	DY-187	14.9/26
Ignoring Blake's objections, Krystle continues her investigation into Alexis's deathbed marriage to Cecil Colby. Leslie follows Sean to his father's gravesite, discovers his true identity as Joseph Anders's son and uses this information to coerce Sean to accept her as an equal partner in his scheme. Dana returns to a forgiving Adam and tells him of Sean's blackmail. Alexis is devastated when she asks for her children's support for her campaign and only Adam offers any amount of endorsement. After Fallon and Dex fly to Natumbe to check out the Vitron oil deal, Fallon decides to fight Steven in favor of the deal. Krystle threatens to reveal the findings of her investigation to the press if Alexis does not withdraw from the election.
191	15	"The Rifle"	Don Medford	Story by : Jeff Ryder; Teleplay by : Frank V. Furino	January 20, 1988	DY-188	16.3/28
When Krystle learns that Cecil Colby's will was changed soon after he and Alexis were married, Krystle thinks that she finally has solid evidence against Alexis. Steven is outvoted and reluctantly authorizes the Vitron oil deal. Sean's vendetta against Alexis and the Carringtons is put into effect. Alexis has second thoughts about running for governor when a reporter hints at a scandal behind her marriage to Cecil. At an electoral debate, Sean accidentally shoots Alexis with a bullet he meant for Blake.
192	16	"The Bracelet"	Irving J. Moore	Story by : Jeff Ryder; Teleplay by : Frank V. Furino	January 27, 1988	DY-189	14.4/26
Recovering from her wounds, Alexis tells Blake she has decided to withdraw from the election, but when she becomes aware of her sudden rise in popularity, she reconsiders. Karen's husband, Jesse, shows up and tells her he never signed the final divorce papers, making them still legally married. After Jeff bails Sammy Jo out of her financial debts, Steven offers him a warning to stay away from his ex-wife. Jeff saves Sammy Jo from an attempted rape and realizes he is falling in love with her. In her bedroom, Alexis discovers a bracelet she had given to Leslie.
193	17	"The Warning"	Don Medford	James Harmon Brown & Barbara Esensten	February 3, 1988	DY-190	14.9/24
Leslie fears that Alexis knows about her affair with Sean, who is behind Jesse's sudden reappearance in Karen's life. Steven, Fallon and Adam are stunned to learn that Jeff is the one who is buying large amounts of Denver-Carrington stock. Adam tries to pay Jesse $100,000 to leave Denver, but Sean demands that Jesse stay in town and convince Karen to sue for custody of the baby she is carrying for Adam and Dana.
194	18	"Adam's Son"	Nancy Malone	Story by : Jeff Ryder; Teleplay by : Edward De Blasio	February 10, 1988	DY-191	15.0/26
Alexis toys with Leslie, asking questions about the bracelet she gave her. Jeff resigns as Blake's campaign manager after Blake voices his displeasure over Jeff's tactics in maneuvering into Denver-Carrington. Sean denies Alexis's accusation that he is having an affair with Leslie, but Alexis is not completely convinced. After walking in on Adam and Jesse locked in a bitter fight, Karen falls to the floor with labor pains. After Sean threatens Leslie, Leslie turns to Dex, telling him she knows Sean's true identity. Dex reveals to Alexis that Sean is really Joseph's son. Adam and Dana's joy over the birth of their son is short-lived when Karen tearfully tells them she cannot give up her baby.
195	19	"The Scandal"	Irving J. Moore	Story by : Jeff Ryder; Teleplay by : Frank V. Furino	March 2, 1988	DY-192	11.1/19
Alexis warns Blake of Sean's vengeful agenda. Blake and Dex leave for Natumbe and discover the illegal arms shipment, but they are locked in the hold of the tanker. Fearing her relationship with Jeff will affect her friendship with Fallon, Sammy Jo asks Jeff to keep their romance secret. Adam is elated when he discovers that he truly is Adam Carrington, but again his joy is short-lived when he is served papers for Karen's custody suit to keep the baby. Alexis hires Morgan Hess to investigate Sean and learns of his extensive, international criminal history. Blake and Dex manage to escape when Sean detonates a bomb on board the tanker; however, they mistakenly believe that Sean was killed by the explosion. Dynasty was preempted for two weeks by the 1988 Winter Olympics on February 17 and 24, 1988.
196	20	"The Trial"	Ray Danton	James Harmon Brown & Barbara Esensten	March 9, 1988	DY-193	12.3/21
Blake returns to Colorado facing accusations that he was involved in an illegal weapons deal. Concerned that the bad press will harm his campaign, Fallon and Steven fly to Natumbe to find proof that will clear their father's name. The custody trial commences and quickly turns ugly; horrified over the nature of the proceedings, Dana blurts out that the baby belongs with his mother, Karen. Heartbroken, Adam moves out of their bedroom. Upon learning that Jeff and Fallon are divorced, Leslie attempts to rekindle her brief relationship with Jeff, unaware that he is secretly seeing Sammy Jo. Jeff and Blake patch up their differences and Blake asks Jeff to return as his campaign manager. Steven and Fallon return to Denver with documents that prove Sean was behind the arms shipment. Krystle begins experiencing headaches, but conceals it from her family. Alexis tries to conceal her terror when she is told the body assumed to be Sean is Harry Thresher's.
197	21	"The Proposal"	Don Medford	Story by : Jeff Ryder; Teleplay by : Frank V. Furino	March 16, 1988	DY-194	13.6/24
Leslie finds herself out of favor with nearly everyone in the family. Alexis and Blake are neck and neck in the race for governor. Jeff proposes to Sammy Jo and, upon learning the news, neither Steven nor Fallon deals with it very well. Dana finally decides to leave Adam. Karen goes to the hospital to see her baby, only to discover that he is missing.
198	22	"Colorado Roulette"	Irving J. Moore	Story by : Jeff Ryder; Teleplay by : Edward De Blasio	March 30, 1988	DY-195	16.1/26
After kidnapping Adam's son, Sean takes Leslie hostage. Both Blake and Alexis lose the gubernatorial election. Leslie manages to call Adam, but Sean catches her and assaults her; however, her call leads Adam to find his son. Jeff is left in a compromising position when old feelings for Fallon return after he proposed to Sammy Jo. The judge awards custody to Karen. Blake discovers that Krystle has been covering up her health issue. Sean holds Alexis at gunpoint in her apartment and when Dex arrives, he and Sean fight until the gun goes off. Dynasty was preempted by the two-hour premiere of another Aaron Spelling series, HeartBeat, on March 23, 1988. "Colorado Roulette" is the last episode to air on a Wednesday, and Dynasty moves to Thursdays for season nine.

== Reception ==
In season eight, Dynasty was ranked #41 in the United States with a 14.3 Nielsen rating.
