= Dynasty (1981 TV series) season 5 =

Dynasty
- Season 5
- No. of episodes: 29

Release
- Original network: ABC
- Original release: September 26, 1984 – May 15, 1985

Season chronology
- ← Previous; Season 4 Next → Season 6

The fifth season of Dynasty originally aired in the United States on ABC from September 26, 1984, through May 15, 1985. The series, created by Richard and Esther Shapiro and produced by Aaron Spelling, revolves around the Carringtons, a wealthy family residing in Denver, Colorado.

Season five stars John Forsythe as millionaire oil magnate Blake Carrington; Linda Evans as his wife Krystle; Jack Coleman as Blake and Alexis' earnest son Steven; Gordon Thomson as Blake and Alexis' eldest son Adam; John James as Blake's former son-in-law Jeff Colby; Pamela Bellwood as Steven's wife, Claudia; Heather Locklear as Krystle's niece and Steven's ex-wife Sammy Jo; Michael Nader as Alexis' husband Dex Dexter; Catherine Oxenberg as Blake and Alexis' youngest daughter, Amanda; Michael Praed as Amanda's fiancé Prince Michael of Moldavia; Diahann Carroll as Blake's half-sister Dominique Deveraux; Billy Dee Williams as Dominique's husband, Brady Lloyd; Rock Hudson as Sammy Jo's biological father, Daniel Reece; Ali MacGraw as photographer Lady Ashley Mitchell; and Joan Collins as Alexis Colby, Blake's ex-wife and the mother of Adam, Fallon, Steven and Amanda. The season also introduced recast Emma Samms as Blake and Alexis' daughter Fallon.

== Development ==
Driven by the new head writer and producer Camille Marchetta, who had devised the wildly successful "Who Shot J.R.?" scenario on Dallas five years earlier, Dynasty hit #1 in the fifth season. During the season, Dynasty attracted controversy when Rock Hudson's real-life HIV-positive status was revealed after a romantic storyline between his character Daniel Reece and Evans' Krystle. Hudson's scenes required him to kiss Evans and, as news that he had contracted AIDS broke, there was speculation Evans would be at risk. The event led to a Screen Actors Guild rule requiring the notification of performers in advance of any scenes that require open-mouth kissing.

Undoubtedly the most famous Dynasty cliffhanger is the so-called "Moldavian Massacre" which occurs in the May 15, 1985 fifth-season finale. Amanda and Prince Michael's royal wedding is interrupted by terrorists during a military coup in Moldavia, riddling the chapel with bullets and leaving all of the major characters lying seemingly lifeless. Esther Shapiro later said, "It was a fairy-tale terrorist attack. It was beautifully shot, like a Goya painting." It became the most talked-about episode of any TV series during the calendar year of 1985, with a viewership of 25.9 million. In 2011, Ken Tucker of Entertainment Weekly named it one of the seven "Unforgettable Cliff-Hangers" of prime time dramatic television.

== Plot ==
In the story, Alexis is exonerated for Mark's murder and her secret daughter Amanda comes to Denver and discovers that Blake is her father. Steven has married Claudia but leaves her for another man, and Claudia starts an affair with Adam. The marriage of Blake and Krystle is in crisis after the birth of their daughter Krystina; Dominique struggles to be accepted as a Carrington, and loses her husband Brady Lloyd in the process; and Sammy Jo discovers she is the heiress to a huge fortune. At the end of the season, an amnesiac Fallon reappears while the rest of the family go to Europe for the wedding of Amanda and Prince Michael of Moldavia.

== Cast ==
=== Main ===
- John Forsythe as Blake Carrington
- Linda Evans as Krystle Carrington (Note: Evans also plays Krystle's look-a-like Rita Lesley for 4 episodes starting from "Photo Finish" (ep. 5.23).)
- John James as Jeff Colby
- Pamela Bellwood as Claudia Blaisdel
- Gordon Thomson as Adam Carrington
- Jack Coleman as Steven Carrington
- Michael Nader as Dex Dexter
- Heather Locklear as Sammy Jo Carrington (Note: Locklear appears only in "Disappearance" (ep. 5.1), "The Rescue" (ep. 5.4), "Photo Finish" (ep. 5.23), "Sammy Jo" (ep. 5.26), "The Heiress" (ep. 5.28) and "Royal Wedding" (ep. 5.29).)
- Catherine Oxenberg as Amanda Carrington (Note: Oxenberg is added to the opening credits from "Amanda" (ep. 5.7).)
- Billy Dee Williams as Brady Lloyd (Note: Williams appears only in "Disappearance" (ep. 5.1), "The Mortgage" (ep. 5.2), "Amanda" (ep. 5.7), "The Avenger" (ep. 5.13) and "Triangles" (ep. 5.17).)
- Michael Praed as Prince Michael of Moldavia (Note: Praed appears in the opening credits from "The Ball" (ep. 5.18), except for "The Collapse" (ep. 5.20) or "Life and Death" (ep. 5.21).)
- Emma Samms as Fallon Carrington Colby (Note: Samms first appears as a guest star in "Kidnapped" (ep. 5.27) before being added to the opening credits for "Royal Wedding" (ep. 5.29).)
- Ali MacGraw as Lady Ashley Mitchell (Note: MacGraw and Hudson are credited as "special guest star". Hudson appears on a semi-regular basis from "The Holiday Spirit" (ep. 5.12) to "Sammy Jo" (ep. 5.26), missing the occasional episode. McGraw appears from "Foreign Relations" (ep. 5.16), except for "Triangles" (ep. 5.17).)
- Rock Hudson as Daniel Reece
- Diahann Carroll as Dominique Deveraux (Note: Carroll appears on a semi-regular basis, missing the occasional episode.)
- Joan Collins as Alexis Carrington

=== Recurring ===
- William Beckley as Gerard
- William Campbell as Luke Fuller
- Susan Scannell as Nicole Simpson
- Virginia Hawkins as Jeanette Robbins
- Richard Hatch as Dean Caldwell
- Betty Harford as Hilda Gunnerson
- Joel Fabiani as King Galen of Moldavia

=== Notable guest stars ===
- Clive Revill as Warren Ballard
- Kevin McCarthy as Billy Waite
- Bradford Dillman as Hal Lombard
- Juliet Mills as Rosalind Bedford
- Bibi Besch as Dr. Veronica Miller
- Kerry Armstrong as Elena, Duchess of Branagh
- Peter Mark Richman as Andrew Laird
- Paul Burke as Neal McVane
- John Saxon as Rashid Ahmed
- Hank Brandt as Morgan Hess
- James Sutorious as Gordon Wales
- Harry Andrews as Tom Carrington

Cast notes

== Episodes ==
No. overall	No. in season	Title	Directed by	Written by	Original release date	Prod. code	Rating/share (households)
89	1	"Disappearance"	Irving J. Moore	Story by : Camille Marchetta; Teleplay by : Edward De Blasio	September 26, 1984	DY-087	22.2/34
Jeff goes after Fallon and finds her car wrecked by the side of a road after a collision with a truck, but Fallon is gone. Alexis has to pay $2 million bail. Brady Lloyd, Dominique's husband, comes to Denver. Adam drives Sammy Jo to the airport, but she fools him and runs off with Danny.
90	2	"The Mortgage"	Jerome Courtland	Story by : Camille Marchetta; Teleplay by : Dennis Turner	October 10, 1984	DY-088	25.1/36
Blake and Jeff continue to search for Fallon while Dominique makes her singing debut at La Mirage. Meanwhile, Blake takes a mortgage out on the mansion to help finance his strategy to help Denver-Carrington's recovery. But Alexis gets wind of the plan and secretly puts up the money herself to gain an advantage over Blake. Dynasty was preempted by Game 2 of the 1984 American League Championship Series on October 3, 1984.
91	3	"Fallon"	Gwen Arner	Story by : Camille Marchetta; Teleplay by : Edward De Blasio	October 17, 1984	DY-089	26.1/40
Alexis is arrested for attempting to leave the country while Blake learns from Jeff that Fallon has died.
92	4	"The Rescue"	Irving J. Moore	Story by : Camille Marchetta; Teleplay by : Dennis Turner	October 24, 1984	DY-090	26.3/39
Blake tells Alexis and the rest of the family that Fallon has died in a plane crash with Peter De Vilbis. Fallon's funeral is held. Adam finds Sammy Jo, ties her up, and rescues baby Danny, returning him to his father, Steven. Dominique tells Blake that they have the same father.
93	5	"The Trial"	Gwen Arner	Story by : Joel Steiger; Teleplay by : Paul Savage	October 31, 1984	DY-091	24.9/39
Alexis' trial for the murder of Mark Jennings starts. Steven is called to the stand to testify against her.
94	6	"The Verdict"	Jerome Courtland	Story by : Camille Marchetta and Joel Steiger; Teleplay by : Stephen and Elinor Karpf	November 7, 1984	DY-092	25.7/39
Steven testifies that he saw Alexis with Mark on the balcony the night that he died. The jury decide that Alexis is guilty of murder in the first degree.
95	7	"Amanda"	Irving J. Moore	Story by : Camille Marchetta & Joel Steiger; Teleplay by : Edward De Blasio	November 14, 1984	DY-093	23.5/35
Catherine Oxenberg joins the cast as Amanda, revealing herself to be Alexis's daughter. Dex and Adam track down the real culprit behind Mark Jennings' murder.
96	8	"The Secret"	Jerome Courtland	Story by : Camille Marchetta; Teleplay by : Dennis Turner	November 21, 1984	DY-094	24.3/38
Amanda is upset with Alexis for denying their relationship and demands that Alexis prove her love by openly acknowledging Amanda as her daughter. Hoping to clear his name, Blake asks Dominique for help in finding Rashid Ahmed. Alexis forgives Steven for testifying against her after she realizes it was a case of mistaken identity. Both Krystle and Claudia feel that their husbands are pulling away from them. Luke Fuller, a new PR employee at ColbyCo, shows an interest in Steven, and when Steven again puts work ahead of spending time with her, Claudia agrees to have dinner with Dean Caldwell, a local gallery owner. Jeff meets Nicole Simpson, who is secretly Peter De Vilbis's estranged widow. Blake suspects that he is Amanda's father and has a confrontation with Alexis.
97	9	"Domestic Intrigue"	Irving J. Moore	Story by : Camille Marchetta & Joel Steiger; Teleplay by : Edward De Blasio	November 28, 1984	DY-095	25.2/38
Blake makes inquiries into Amanda's paternity. Dominique and Adam go to Istanbul to track down Rashid Ahmed. Blake is concerned about Jeff's behaviour. De Vilbis was keeping something from Nicole and she wonders if Jeff found out about it through Fallon. Alexis's preoccupation with keeping Amanda's paternity secret leaves Dex out in the cold. Adam forces a confession out of Rashid Ahmed, but Ahmed is killed in the process. Krystle, unsure if it was Blake's intention to have Ahmed killed, argues with him and then takes a tumble down the stairs.
98	10	"Krystina"	Jerome Courtland	Story by : Camille Marchetta; Teleplay by : Will Lorin	December 5, 1984	DY-096	25.3/37
Jeff catches Nicole asking questions about Fallon. Claudia is upset when Alexis has Steven go to Santa Barbara with Luke Fuller for ColbyCo, and later she kisses Dean Caldwell. Alexis and Dex fight about Blake and Amanda yet again. Amanda flirts with Dex. Jeff discovers that Nicole was married to Peter De Vilbis. After falling down the stairs, Krystle goes into premature labour and gives birth to a baby girl, whom they name Krystina. Later it is discovered that the baby has respiratory distress syndrome.
99	11	"Swept Away"	Irving J. Moore	Story by : Camille Marchetta; Teleplay by : Dennis Turner	December 12, 1984	DY-097	26.5/39
Jeff learns that Nicole is searching for Peter's half of a treasure map and that Peter had given it to Fallon for safe keeping. Blake promises Amanda he will help her find out who her father is. When Nicole tells Jeff that Peter was with one of his mistresses in Seattle before the plane crash, he wonders if it's possible it was she who died on the plane and that Fallon could still be alive. Amanda and Dex sleep together in a mountain cabin. Alexis finally agrees to marry Dex.
100	12	"That Holiday Spirit"	Curtis Harrington	Story by : Camille Marchetta & Susan Baskin; Teleplay by : Edward De Blasio	December 19, 1984	DY-098	25.9/40
Dex and Alexis go to London to get married. Blake purchases Allegre back for Krystle for Christmas. She gives him a portrait of Fallon. Claudia confesses to Steven that she cheated. Daniel Reese, the man from whom Blake bought Allegre, is an old boyfriend of Krystle's sister. Amanda finally learns that her father is Blake Carrington, and the two share a happy reunion. Believing that Blake is finally going to acknowledge her as his half-sister, Dominique is furious when Blake instead welcomes Amanda to the Carrington family.
101	13	"The Avenger"	Irving J. Moore	Story by : Camille Marchetta & Susan Baskin; Teleplay by : Dennis Turner	January 2, 1985	DY-099	26.2/38
Claudia moves out of the Carrington mansion. Alexis offers to buy Dominique's shares of Denver-Carrington. Daniel urges Krystle to start her own business working with Arabian horses. Krystle reveals to Steven that Daniel is Sammy Jo's biological father. Jeff and Nicole find Peter's half of the treasure map in Fallon's safe at La Mirage. Blake is jealous over the developing closeness he sees between Krystle and Daniel. Dominique informs Blake that she is suing him because he used part of the funds she invested in Denver-Carrington to pay off the mortgage on his home. Blake learns that his father has had a heart attack and makes plans to go to Sumatra to see him. Dominique tells Blake she is going with him. Dynasty was preempted by a rerun of Part 1 of the 1983 ABC Wednesday Night Movie Malibu on December 26, 1984.
102	14	"The Will"	Nancy Malone	Story by : Camille Marchetta & Susan Baskin; Teleplay by : Noreen Stone	January 9, 1985	DY-100	27.7/40
As Steven and Claudia's marriage nears its end, Claudia and Adam begin to grow closer. Krystle finally gets to bring baby Krystina home from the hospital. Jeff continues to romance Nicole, all the while thinking of Fallon. Blake, Alexis and Dominique go to Sumatra to visit Blake's dying father, Tom Carrington. Before he dies, he admits that he is indeed Dominique's father and leaves his entire estate to the three of them, but makes Dominique the executor of his will, much to Alexis's chagrin.
103	15	"The Treasure"	Curtis Harrington	Story by : Camille Marchetta & Susan Baskin; Teleplay by : Stephen & Elinor Karpf	January 16, 1985	DY-101	27.0/39
Jeff and Nicole go treasure hunting in Bolivia; they find the treasure but no trace of Fallon, and a drunk and disconsolate Jeff marries Nicole. Having finally gained Blake's acceptance that she is his sister and being formally welcomed into the Carrington family, Dominique drops her lawsuit against Blake. Krystle begins work on her horse breeding business with Daniel's help, but without Blake's support. Steven tries to make one last effort to save his marriagebut instead argues with Claudia when he sees her having dinner with Adam. Meanwhile, Alexis is frustrated by Amanda's devotion to Blake and her acceptance of Dominique as her new aunt.
104	16	"Foreign Relations"	Kim Friedman	Story by : Camille Marchetta & Susan Baskin; Teleplay by : Edward De Blasio	January 23, 1985	DY-102	25.0/37
Blake's continued jealousy of Krystle and Daniel's business relationship pushes Krystle further away. Upon returning from Bolivia, Jeff and Nicole announce their marriage. After Adam makes a derogatory remark about Steven's homosexuality, they get into a fight. Later, Steven tells Luke that he is ready to begin a relationship with him. After catching Dex carrying a drunken Amanda to her bedroom, Alexis suggests to Amanda that she move into the Carrington mansion. Nicole has a hard time adjusting to life in the Carrington mansion with the specter of Fallon Carrington looming over her. Blake seeks the assistance of Lady Ashley Mitchell in negotiating with the Chinese concerning his South China Sea oil leases.
105	17	"Triangles"	Irving J. Moore	Story by : Camille Marchetta & Susan Baskin; Teleplay by : Dennis Turner	January 30, 1985	DY-103	27.0/39
Blake reaches an agreement with the Chinese government that will allow him to begin drilling in the South China Sea, but Alexis is determined to get her hands on the leases. Amanda moves out of Alexis's apartment and into the Carrington mansion. Steven decides to end his relationship with Luke Fuller and tells Claudia that he wants her back. Alexis attempts a takeover of Dominique's company so that she can blackmail her into relinquishing her 40% of Denver-Carrington and her position as executor of Tom Carrington's will. Brady is frustrated feeling that Dominique is turning to her new family and away from him and he tells her their marriage is over.
106	18	"The Ball"	Jerome Courtland	Story by : Camille Marchetta & Susan Baskin; Teleplay by : John Pleshette	February 6, 1985	DY-104	25.9/41
Blake, Alexis, Dex and Amanda travel to Acapulco for an oil conference, and Krystle is disturbed when she calls Blake's hotel room and Alexis answers. Amanda meets Prince Michael of Moldavia. Jeff gets angry when he finds Nicole wearing some of Fallon's old clothes and jewelry. Adam feels that Blake is continually leaving him out of important Denver-Carrington business. Claudia tells Steven that their marriage is over. Daniel kisses Krystle after she has a horseback riding accident.
107	19	"Circumstantial Evidence"	Curtis Harrington	Story by : Camille Marchetta & Donald R. Boyle; Teleplay by : Edward De Blasio	February 13, 1985	DY-105	23.4/34
Following their kiss, Daniel confesses to Krystle that he has always loved her, but she tells him that she loves Blake. Blake and Krystle are both sent photographs indicating that they may be cheating on each other, Krystle with Daniel and Blake with Lady Ashley Mitchell. Nicole is frustrated trying to live up to Fallon's angelic reputation and lashes out at Jeff by listing off Fallon's numerous past sexual relationships. After another clash with Alexis, Dex decides to join Daniel on one of his covert missions. Amanda learns Michael is engaged. Alexis gets the 25% of the South China Sea leases that Blake had put up for auction. Claudia is hurt when she sees Steven with Luke after Steven told her he was not going to see Luke anymore; she turns to Adam for comfort. Blake confronts Krystle about her feelings for Daniel.
108	20	"The Collapse"	John Patterson	Story by : Camille Marchetta & Donald R. Boyle; Teleplay by : Donald R. Boyle	February 20, 1985	DY-106	24.6/35
Alexis learns that Dominique is staging a hostile takeover of ColbyCo as a counter attack against Alexis trying to take her company. Krystle suspects that Lady Ashley sent the photographs to her and Blake. Alexis is livid when she finds out that Nicole was married to Peter DeVilbis. Brady sends Dominique divorce papers but, in the end, refuses to sell his shares in Dominique's company to Alexis, effectively stopping the takeover. Later that evening, Dominique collapses while singing after her victory over Alexis.
109	21	"Life and Death"	Irving J. Moore	Story by : Camille Marchetta & Donald R. Boyle; Teleplay by : Dennis Turner	February 27, 1985	DY-107	24.8/37
Dominique has to have heart surgery, and the operation is a success. Alexis discovers that Jeff and Nicole were never really married; once she tells Jeff, he ends his relationship with Nicole. Dex returns from his mission in Paraguay sick with malaria. After meeting Luke, Blake tells Steven that he'll try to accept him for who he is, but then Blake urges Claudia to give Steven another chance.
110	22	"Parental Consent"	Kim Friedman	Story by : Camille Marchetta & Donald R. Boyle; Teleplay by : Edward De Blasio	March 6, 1985	DY-108	24.8/36
Alexis manages to persuade King Galen to let the marriage between Amanda and Michael go ahead. Krystle confronts Blake with a photograph she received of Lady Ashley kissing Blake.
111	23	"Photo Finish"	Robert Scheerer	Story by : Camille Marchetta & Donald R. Boyle; Teleplay by : Susan Miller	March 13, 1985	DY-109	24.2/36
Sammy Jo is revealed as the person behind the incriminating photos being sent to Krystle and Blake. Prince Michael asks Amanda to marry him, but before she can give him an answer, she asks Dex if there can be any future for the two of them. Sammy Jo meets Rita, a woman who looks very much like Krystle. Krystle leaves the Carrington mansion with Krystina after an argument with Blake.
112	24	"The Crash"	Irving J. Moore	Story by : Camille Marchetta; Teleplay by : Dennis Turner	March 20, 1985	DY-110	22.6/35
Adam convinces Claudia to divorce Steven. Alexis tells Luke that she supports his relationship with Steven. Dominique returns home from the hospital. Amanda and Michael split up. Blake and Daniel are involved in a plane crash.
113	25	"Reconciliation"	Nancy Malone	Story by : Camille Marchetta; Teleplay by : Edward De Blasio	March 27, 1985	DY-111	23.1/35
Blake and Daniel survive the plane crash and are rescued with Daniel being severely wounded. Dex is jealous when he sees that Alexis is visibly disturbed by the news of Blake's crash, and later Alexis witnesses a tender moment between Dex and Amanda. Alexis badgers Blake to get his help regarding Amanda and Michael's engagement and is thrown out of the Carrington mansion by Krystle. Blake and Krystle decide to make a go of their marriage. At the hospital, Krystle tells the recovering Daniel that Sammy Jo is his daughter. Adam is furious when he overhears Blake say that he intends to rewrite his will to give Jeff control of Denver-Carrington.
114	26	"Sammy Jo"	Irving J. Moore	Story by : Camille Marchetta & Susan Baskin; Teleplay by : Dennis Turner	April 3, 1985	DY-112	23.1/35
Adam sabotages Jeff's work at Denver-Carrington and tells Claudia he intends to take over the company. Jeff spots Fallon in a photograph taken by Lady Ashley. Meanwhile, Krystle and Daniel travel to New York to meet Sammy Jo; Daniel finally tells her that he is her biological father. After an awkward reunion, Daniel then leaves for a covert mission in Libya, but before he leaves, he makes Krystle promise to look after Sammy Jo for him.
115	27	"Kidnapped"	Jerome Courtland	Story by : Camille Marchetta & Susan Baskin; Teleplay by : Dennis Turner	April 10, 1985	DY-113	24.5/37
Alexis refuses to allow herself to believe that Fallon may be alive. Amanda is briefly kidnapped after attending a fashion show. Dex receives tragic news. An amnesiac Fallon (now played by Emma Samms) begs the LAPD for help.
116	28	"The Heiress"	Irving J. Moore	Story by : Camille Marchetta & Susan Baskin; Teleplay by : Edward De Blasio	May 8, 1985	DY-114	21.9/33
Krystle is saddened by the news of Daniel's death. Alexis, Michael and Amanda go to Moldavia to prepare for the big wedding and meet Michael's jealous former flame Elena, the duchess of Brana. Elena makes Amanda believe she is having an affair with Michael. Galen wants Alexis to leave Dex for him. Claudia is angered to learn that Blake is considering selling La Mirage. Daniel's will awards his farm, Delta Rho, and his fortune to Sammy Jo, though it is held in trust and Krystle has control over it. Dynasty was preempted for three weeks by a repeat of the two-hour premiere of Hotel from 1983, another repeat of that show and The Fall Guy, and by a Miss Hollywood 1985 special hosted by Gene Kelly from April 17-May 1, 1985.
117	29	"Royal Wedding"	Jerome Courtland	Story by : Camille Marchetta & Susan Baskin; Teleplay by : Edward De Blasio	May 15, 1985	DY-115	25.9/39
Steven promises Luke they, along with Danny, will move in together when the wedding is over. Meanwhile, Adam and Claudia look like they are meant for each other. Sammy Jo plots revenge against Krystle, and gets an unusual idea when she sees Rita pretending to be Krystle. In Moldavia, Elena confesses to Amanda that she lied about the affair with Michael. The entire family gathers to watch Amanda and Michael get married. As the couple are proclaimed man and wife, armed revolutionaries attack the chapel, shooting everybody inside. Meanwhile back in Los Angeles, a woman stops by the Los Angeles Police Department needing help identifying herself: Fallon Carrington.

== Reception ==
In season five, Dynasty was ranked #1 in the United States with a 25.0 Nielsen rating.
