= List of Dynasty (1981 TV series) characters =

John Forsythe and the female cast of Dynasty season six (1985–1986)

Dynasty is an American prime time television soap opera that aired on ABC from January 12, 1981, to May 11, 1989. The series, created by Richard and Esther Shapiro and produced by Aaron Spelling, revolves around the Carringtons, a wealthy family residing in Denver, Colorado. Dynasty stars John Forsythe as oil magnate Blake Carrington, Linda Evans as his new wife Krystle, and later Joan Collins as his former wife Alexis. A two-part miniseries, Dynasty: The Reunion, aired in October 1991.

== Overview ==
Main cast (opening credits in every episode)
Semi-regular cast (opening credits in select episodes)
Recurring guest star
Guest star

Character	Actor	Seasons									
Character	Actor	1	2	3	4	5	6	7	8	9	Reunion
Blake Carrington	John Forsythe	Main	Main	Main	Main	Main	Main	Main	Main	Main	Main
Krystle Carrington	Linda Evans (Note: Evans also plays Krystle's look-a-like Rita Lesley in seasons 5 and 6.)	Main	Main	Main	Main	Main	Main	Main	Main	Main	Main
Fallon Carrington	Pamela Sue Martin	Main	Main	Main	Main						
Fallon Carrington	Emma Samms					Main	Main	Main	Main	Main	Main
Claudia Blaisdel Carrington	Pamela Bellwood	Main	Main	Main	Main	Main	Main				
Steven Carrington	Al Corley	Main	Main								Main
Steven Carrington	Jack Coleman			Main	Main	Main	Main	Main	Main		
Jeff Colby	John James	Main	Main	Main	Main	Main	Main	Main	Main	Main	Main
Michael Culhane	Wayne Northrop	Main						Main			
Lindsay Blaisdel	Katy Kurtzman	Main	Stand-in								
Walter Lankershim	Dale Robertson	Main (Note: Credited in opening as "Special Guest Star".)									
Matthew Blaisdel	Bo Hopkins	Main						Guest	Main		
Joseph Anders	Lee Bergere	Recurring	Main	Main	Main						
Cecil Colby	Lloyd Bochner	Recurring	Main	Main							
Alexis Colby	Joan Collins	Stand-in	Main	Main	Main	Main	Main	Main	Main	Main	Main
Dr. Nick Toscanni	James Farentino		Main								
Sammy Jo Carrington	Heather Locklear		Main	Main	Main	Main	Main	Main	Main	Main	Main
Adam Carrington	Gordon Thomson			Main	Main	Main	Main	Main	Main	Main	
Adam Carrington	Robin Sachs										Main
Mark Jennings	Geoffrey Scott			Main	Main						
Kirby Anders	Kathleen Beller			Main	Main						Main
Tracy Kendall	Deborah Adair				Main						
Peter De Vilbis	Helmut Berger				Main						
Dex Dexter	Michael Nader				Main	Main	Main	Main	Main	Main	
Dominique Deveraux	Diahann Carroll				Main	Main	Main	Main			
Brady Lloyd	Billy Dee Williams					Main					
Amanda Carrington	Catherine Oxenberg					Main	Main				
Amanda Carrington	Karen Cellini							Main			
Daniel Reece	Rock Hudson					Main					
Ashley Mitchell	Ali MacGraw					Main					
Prince Michael of Moldavia	Michael Praed					Main	Main				
Miles Colby	Maxwell Caulfield						Main (Note: Credited in opening as "Special Appearance by" as part of a crossover with the spin-off show The Colbys.)				Main
Joel Abrigore	George Hamilton						Main				
Jason Colby	Charlton Heston						Main				
Constance Colby	Barbara Stanwyck						Main				
Sable Colby	Stephanie Beacham						Main			Main	
Monica Colby	Tracy Scoggins						Main			Main	
Bliss Colby	Claire Yarlett						Main				
Garrett Boydston	Ken Howard						Main				
Caress Morell	Kate O'Mara						Main	Main			
Zachary Powers	Ricardo Montalbán						Main	Main			
Ben Carrington	Christopher Cazenove						Main	Main			
Clay Fallmont	Ted McGinley						Main	Main			
Dana Waring Carrington	Leann Hunley							Main	Main	Main	
Leslie Carrington	Terri Garber							Main	Main		
Sarah Curtis	Cassie Yates							Main			
Sean Rowan	James Healey								Main	Stand-in	
Arlen Marshall	Michael Brandon										Main
Jeremy Van Dorn	Jeroen Krabbé										Main

Cast notes

== Main ==
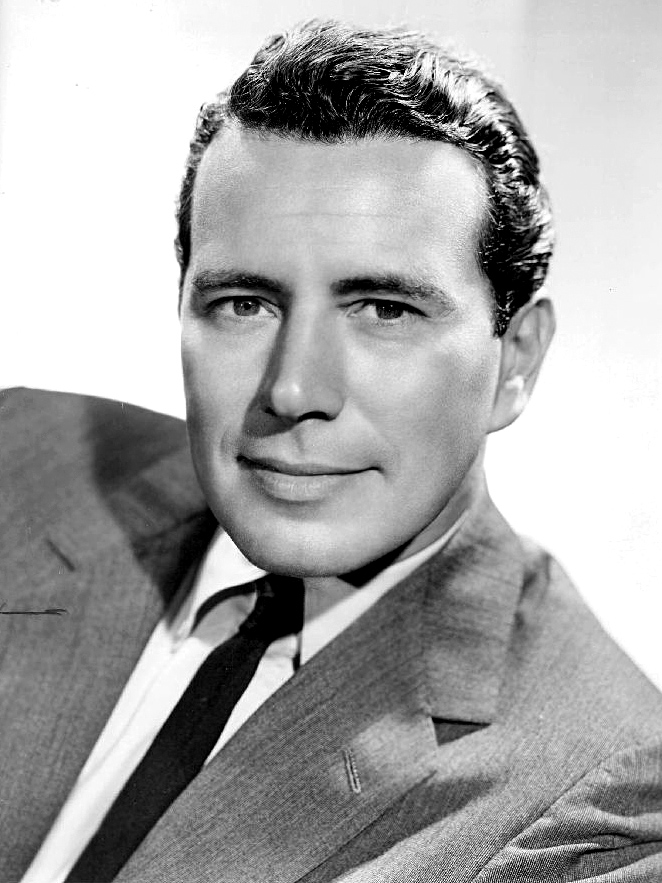
John Forsythe plays Blake Carrington

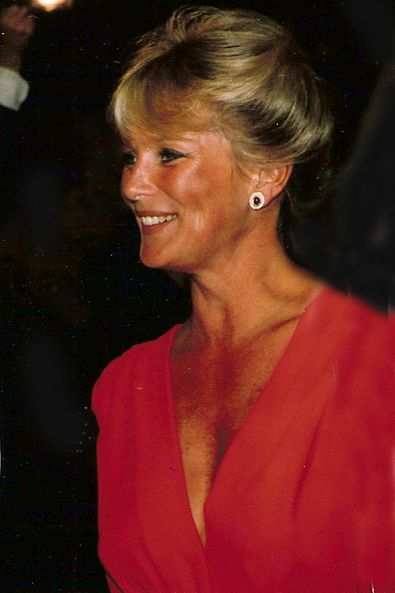
Linda Evans plays Krystle Carrington

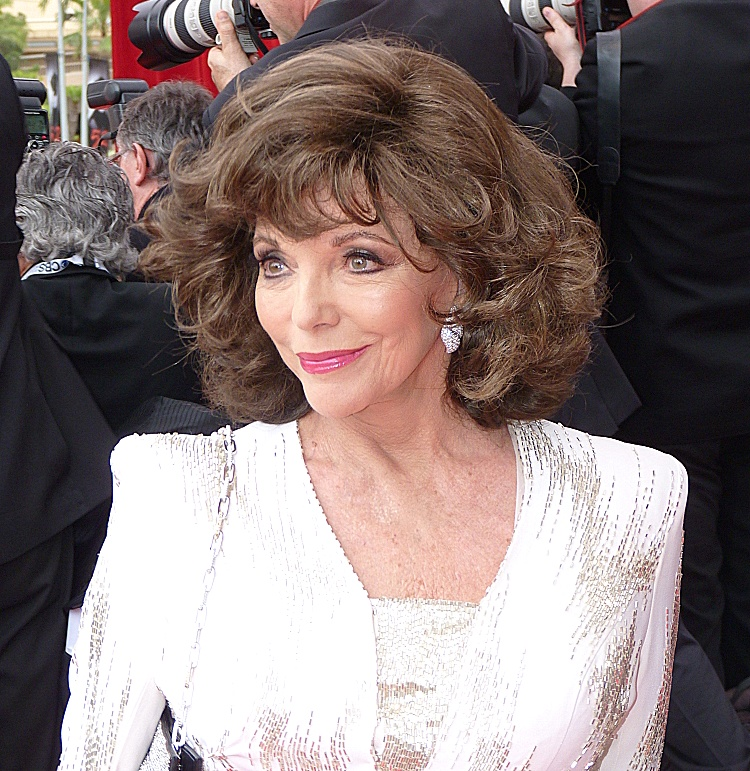
Joan Collins plays Alexis Carrington Colby

Blake Carrington (John Forsythe (original cast), 1981–1989; 1991)
The self-made CEO of Denver-Carrington and the principal character of the series. Married to his former secretary Krystle Jennings, he has four grown children with his scheming ex-wife Alexis, and later a daughter with Krystle. Initially a ruthless man in both business and family matters, Blake softens into a more benevolent patriarchal figure early on in the series.

Krystle Grant Jennings Carrington (Linda Evans (original cast), 1981–1989; 1991)
Blake's younger wife, former wife of tennis pro Mark Jennings and the one-time lover of married geologist Matthew Blaisdel. Krystle is the mother, with Blake, of Krystina, and the aunt of Sammy Jo Dean, the only child of her late sister Iris and Daniel Reece.

Fallon Carrington Colby (Pamela Sue Martin (original cast), 1981–1984; Emma Samms, 1985–1989, 1991)
The second born and elder daughter of Blake and Alexis, the wife of Jeff Colby and the mother, with Jeff, of "Little Blake" and Lauren Colby. As a young woman, she has affairs with chauffeur Michael Culhane, playboy Peter De Vilbis, tennis pro Mark Jennings, doctor Nick Toscanni, and Colby heir, Miles Colby, whom she marries briefly. Fallon and Jeff leave Denver as the primary focus of the spin-off series The Colbys, and then return to Dynasty in 1987.

Claudia Blaisdel Carrington (Pamela Bellwood (original cast), 1981–1986)
The emotionally fragile wife of Matthew Blaisdel, mother of Lindsay, and at one time a close friend of Krystle. When introduced, Claudia had recently been released from a psychiatric hospital. She befriends Steven and they soon have an affair. She is forced to confess on the stand at Blake's murder trial, and Matthew leaves her and takes Lindsay. When she finds out that Lindsay has died, she becomes unhinged and is sent off to a hospital again. She returns and resumes her relationship with Steven, and they marry. Eventually the marriage ends over Steven's sexual confusion, and Claudia marries Adam. Claudia begins to lose her sanity again and dies in a fire she starts accidentally at La Mirage.

Steven Carrington (Al Corley (original cast), 1981–1982; 1991; Jack Coleman, 1983–1988)
The sexually confused, third born and younger son of Blake and Alexis who, despite his conviction that he is homosexual, marries Sammy Jo Dean and Claudia Blaisdel. With Sammy Jo, he fathers Danny Carrington. At different times, the lover of Ted Dinard, Luke Fuller and Bart Fallmont. Steven eventually ends up with Bart in the reunion movie.

Jeff Colby (John James (original cast), 1981–1989; 1991)
The nephew and protege of Cecil Colby who raised him at Nine Oaks, the Colby estate in Denver which neighbors the Carrington estate. Married to Fallon and briefly to Kirby Anders, he is the father of L.B. and Lauren with Fallon. Fallon and Jeff leave Denver as the primary focus of the spin-off series The Colbys, and then return to Dynasty in 1987. At different times, Jeff is involved with Nicole Simpson, Lady Ashley Mitchell, and Leslie Carrington.

Michael Culhane (Wayne Northrop (original cast), 1981; 1986–1987)
The Carrington chauffeur, who is involved in a sexual relationship with heiress Fallon. Michael proves useful to Blake in his shady business dealings, but Blake has him beaten up when he learns of his relationship with Fallon. Michael leaves town in the first season finale episode, "The Testimony". He returns in the seventh season premiere "The Victory", in time to save Fallon's sister Amanda Carrington from a fire at La Mirage. The two become romantically involved as Blake gives Michael his job as Blake's driver back, but Blake fires him when he sees the couple kissing. An angry Michael, not really as poor as he has let on, secretly orchestrates a deal that would give him a piece of Blake's latest venture, but Amanda's mother Alexis reveals his schemes, and he leaves Denver again in "The Sublet".

Lindsay Blaisdel (Katy Kurtzman (original cast), 1981)
Sensitive teenage daughter of Matthew and Claudia. With fragile Claudia newly released from a sanitarium after a breakdown, mother and daughter are trying to reconnect. Hurt and traumatized by the ordeal, Lindsay is further swept up in her parents' domestic troubles. Matthew leaves the country with Lindsay after discovering Claudia's affair with Steven in "The Testimony". Claudia subsequently does everything within her power—including things she finds despicable—to find Lindsay. Matthew and Lindsay are later presumed dead in a car crash in the Peruvian jungle. Matthew mentions to Krystle during his 1987 return that though he survived, Lindsay died from the injuries she sustained in the crash.

Walter Lankershim (Dale Robertson (original cast), 1981)
Oil wildcatter, and Matthew's longtime friend. Walter does not take kindly the shady tactics of his business rival Blake, and goes into business with Matthew. Walter last appears in "The Beating". His death is noted in the season six episode "The Proposal" (1985), in which he leaves Claudia his and Matthew's first oil well, Lankershim-Blaisdel 1. The reveal that the well is dry and worthless precipitates Claudia's final mental breakdown.

Matthew Blaisdel (Bo Hopkins (original cast), 1981; 1987)
Denver–Carrington geologist and Krystle's former lover. Matthew returns to Denver from the Middle East on the eve of Krystle's marriage to Blake. He struggles with his feelings for Krystle as he tries to rebuild his marriage with fragile Claudia, newly released from an institution after a breakdown. Matthew leaves Blake's employ to run his own rig, and soon their rivalry over Krystle transforms into a fierce rivalry over oil. Meanwhile, Claudia's friendship with Blake's son Steven turns into an affair; when the secret comes out, Matthew takes his and Claudia's daughter Lindsay and leaves town. They are later presumed dead in a car crash in the jungles of Peru. Matthew returns in 1987; he and Lindsay had been rescued from the crash by a jungle tribe who saved his life, though Lindsay later died from her injuries. Aided by his Peruvian minions, Matthew storms the Carrington mansion. He wants Krystle to run off with him, and holds the family hostage when she resists. Matthew takes them to the site of his original oil rig, and is eventually killed by his old friend Steven in "The Siege".

Joseph Anders (Lee Bergere (original cast), 1981–1983)
The Carringtons' longtime majordomo, who is staunchly loyal to Blake and takes an immediate dislike to his new bride Krystle. Krystle rises to the challenge and they eventually share a mutual respect. Joseph later shows a deeper loathing for Blake's first wife Alexis, which is further exacerbated by Alexis' ill treatment of Joseph's daughter, Kirby. At the end of season three, Alexis and Krystle are trapped in a cabin that is then set on fire. They survive, and it is eventually revealed that Joseph had set the fire to kill Alexis after she had threatened to disclose a secret related to Kirby's parentage. After learning this, Blake drives to Joseph's home, but is too late as the guilty Joseph has killed himself by way of a self-inflicted gunshot wound in "The Bungalow".

Cecil Colby (Lloyd Bochner (original cast), 1981–1982)
Jeff's uncle, as well as a longtime friend and business rival of Blake's. He makes a secret deal with Blake's daughter Fallon: if she marries Jeff, Cecil will lend Blake financial assistance. CEO of the oil company ColbyCo, Cecil later tries to destroy Blake using the persona Logan Rhinewood. Soon after her arrival, Blake's ex-wife Alexis tells Steven that Cecil is Fallon's father; the reveal sends Fallon into a downward spiral, but it is proven untrue. Cecil becomes romantically involved with Alexis, but has a heart attack while in bed with her. In "The Wedding", he marries Alexis on his deathbed, hoping she will use ColbyCo to ruin Blake. The spin-off series The Colbys later establishes that Cecil has three siblings: older sister Constance Colby and younger brothers Jason Colby and Philip Colby. Philip is thought to be Jeff's father until it is revealed that Jason is.

Alexis Morell Carrington Colby Dexter Rowan (Joan Collins, 1981–1989; 1991)
Former socialite turned businesswoman, married to Blake, Cecil Colby, Dex Dexter, and Sean Rowan. She famously holds a torch for Blake, though she later falls deeply in love with Dex. Her children with Blake are Adam, Fallon, Steven and Amanda. Alexis is romantically attached to a number of men, including Carrington architect and estate manager Roger Grimes, tennis pro Mark Jennings, oilman Rashid Ahmed, King Galen of Moldavia, and shipping tycoon Zach Powers.

Dr. Nick Toscanni (James Farentino, 1981–1982)
Psychiatrist and surgeon who is Blake's friend and employee. In "Alexis' Secret", Blake asks Nick to look in on fragile Claudia after her release from the hospital. Nick saves a suicidal Claudia's life and helps her recover from the disappearance of her husband and daughter, but Nick also holds a secret grudge against Blake and vows revenge. The charismatic doctor flirts with Krystle and beds a married Fallon as he looks for a way to destroy the Carrington patriarch. Finally, Nick confronts Blake about his part in the death of Nick's brother; Blake denies any wrongdoing, but is thrown from his horse and knocked unconscious. In "The Cliff", Nick leaves Blake for dead and departs Denver. It is later revealed that before he left, he arranged Little Blake's kidnapping as revenge.

Samantha Josephine "Sammy Jo" Dean Reece Carrington Fallmont, (Heather Locklear, 1981–1989, 1991)
Greedy, trouble-making yet beautiful niece of Krystle, wife of Steven and Clay Fallmont, and mother of Danny Carrington. It is later revealed that she is the daughter of Daniel Reece.

Adam Carrington (Gordon Thomson, 1982–1989; Robin Sachs, 1991)
First born of Blake and Alexis, kidnapped as an infant and raised as Michael Torrance in Billings, Montana. He learns of his true identity as an adult, and comes to Denver. Obsessed with Kirby Anders and later married to Claudia Blaisdel and Dana Waring, he is a ruthless schemer, constantly plotting to enhance his position in the dynasty.

Mark Jennings (Geoffrey Scott, 1982–1984)
Handsome tennis pro and Krystle's former husband. Alexis discovers that Mark and Krystle's marriage is still valid, and lures him to Denver in "The Siblings" to stir up trouble for Krystle. Mark romances both Alexis and Fallon, and is later murdered in "The Engagement". Alexis is arrested for the crime, but it is ultimately revealed that Neal McVane killed Mark and framed Alexis.

Kirby Anders Colby (Kathleen Beller, 1982–1984, 1991)
The daughter of Joseph, the Carrington major–domo. Schooled in Europe at Blake's expense, she returns to Denver in 1982. She marries Jeff but is pregnant with Adam's baby; Alexis' meddling later prevents her from marrying Adam. She and Adam have a daughter that is stillborn in 1984, and she leaves Denver shortly thereafter. She accepts Adam's proposal of marriage at the end of Dynasty: The Reunion (1991).

Tracy Kendall (Deborah Adair, 1983–1984)
Public relations employee of Denver–Carrington. Scheming and ambitious, Tracy seeks to advance her career either by subterfuge or by sleeping her way to the top. She acts as a spy for Alexis, but is dismissed after she is exposed.

Peter De Vilbis (Helmut Berger, 1983–1984)
European tycoon who becomes engaged to Fallon. He is the owner of the prized racehorse Allegre, and Fallon is later distraught to discover that Peter orchestrated the horse's kidnapping to swindle Blake out of the ransom. Fallon disappears in 1984, and is presumed dead in the small plane crash that killed Peter.

Farnsworth "Dex" Dexter (Michael Nader, 1983–1989)
Alexis' third husband, and arguably the second great love of her life, after Blake. Dex carries on a brief affair with Alexis' daughter Amanda, which strains the relationship between mother and daughter and ultimately ends his marriage. Dex is something of an adventurer and, throughout the series, goes on a number of daring missions. He spent time as a Green Beret, including service in the Vietnam War.

Dominique Deveraux (Diahann Carroll, 1984–1987)
Successful and wealthy chanteuse (birth name Millie Cox), illegitimate daughter of Tom Carrington and Laura Matthews, making her a half-sister to Blake and Ben Carrington. Dominique is initially a strong, tough schemer and fighter who loves going toe-to-toe with Alexis, but after reconciling with the Carrington family, she mellows considerably.

Brady Lloyd (Billy Dee Williams, 1984–1985)
Charming recording executive, previously married to Dominique Deveraux.

Amanda (Bedford) Carrington (Catherine Oxenberg, 1984–1986; Karen Cellini, 1986–1987)
Amanda is the younger daughter (last born of four) of Blake and Alexis, raised in London as Amanda Bedford by Alexis's cousin Rosalind Bedford. She was hidden from Blake out of spite by Alexis, who discovered she was pregnant after he ran her out of Denver. Amanda marries Prince Michael of Moldavia, and is later the lover of Dex, Clay Fallmont and chauffeur Michael Culhane.

Daniel Reece (Rock Hudson, 1984–1985)
Wealthy owner of newspapers and the Delta Rho Stables, he was involved with Iris Grant in Dayton, Ohio, and simultaneously in love with her sister Krystle. Former mercenary who did some work with Dex. Confessed his longtime love to Krystle and left his fortune to his biological daughter Sammy Jo, with Krystle as executrix, when he died in Libya.

Lady Ashley Mitchell (Ali MacGraw, 1985)
Famous photographer and friend of Dominique's, who pursues Blake romantically. She becomes involved with Jeff Colby, but is later shot and killed during the Moldavian Massacre.

Prince Michael of Moldavia (Michael Praed, 1985–1986)
Heir to the European kingdom of Moldavia. In "Circumstantial Evidence", Amanda meets dashing Prince Michael in Acapulco. They are mutually smitten, but he is engaged to another woman. Amanda's mother Alexis schemes for the couple to marry by visiting her old friend King Galen of Moldavia, Michael's father. After a somewhat volatile courtship, Amanda and Michael wed in Moldavia, with all the Carringtons present. However, a political coup comes to fruition and terrorists, bent on seizing the country, attack the ceremony. Michael and the Carringtons are eventually allowed to leave Moldavia, and are told that Galen has been killed. A very-much-alive Galen is rescued by Alexis and Dex, and the King's plans to reclaim his crown force Michael to put his country before his wife. Michael and Amanda's marriage eventually disintegrates. They divorce and he leaves town in "The Dismissal".

Miles Colby (Maxwell Caulfield, 1985–1986, 1991)
Spoiled, hot–headed son of Jason and Sable Colby, and twin brother of Monica, first introduced in "The Aftermath" (1985). Miles is a main character on the spin–off series The Colbys.

Joel Abrigore (George Hamilton, 1985–1986)
Film director who orchestrates a plot to kidnap Krystle and replace her with lookalike Rita Lesley. Sammy Jo initially convinces Rita to impersonate Krystle so that Sammy Jo can access the inheritance left to her by her father. Rita's boyfriend Joel insinuates himself into the scheme, fully substituting Krystle with Rita to steal as much as possible from Blake.

Sabella "Sable" Scott Colby (Stephanie Beacham, 1985; 1988–1989)
Wife of Colby Enterprises magnate Jason Colby and maternal first cousin of Alexis and Caress. Sable first visits Denver in "The Titans" (1985). The character subsequently appears in the spin-off series The Colbys for its entire run from 1985 to 1987. Sable later moves to Denver and Dynasty in "A Touch of Sable", becoming a close friend of the Carrington family and Alexis's biggest rival. She takes over the Carlton Hotel, outmaneuvers Alexis in business, and becomes romantically involved with—and pregnant by—Alexis' ex-husband Dex. She last appears in the 1989 series finale, "Catch 22".

Monica Colby (Tracy Scoggins, 1985; 1988–1989)
Lawyer daughter of Jason and Sable, and Miles' twin sister. She first visits Denver in "The Titans" (1985). Monica subsequently appears in the spin-off series The Colbys for its entire run from 1985 to 1987. Initially thought to be Jeff's cousins, the reveal that Jason is Jeff's father (instead of Jason's brother Philip) makes Monica and Miles Jeff's half siblings. Monica follows Sable to Denver, helping her in her efforts to fight Alexis and serving as Sable's legal counsel. Sable later reveals that Monica and Miles are not Jason Colby's children. Monica last appears in the 1989 series finale, "Catch 22".

Garrett Boydston (Ken Howard, 1985–1986)
Levelheaded though sensitive chief counsel for Colby Enterprises. He hopes to rekindle his long-ago romance with Dominique, which had ended because he was married. Dominique discovers that Garrett had not been married after all, and it is eventually revealed that Garrett is the biological father of Dominique's daughter Jackie.

Caress Morell (Kate O'Mara, 1986)
Younger sister of Alexis, who served five years in a prison in Caracas, Venezuela, because of an incident involving Alexis and her then-lover, Zach Powers. Caress is released and comes to Denver in "Suspicions", hoping to make a fortune by writing a scathing tell-all book about Alexis called Sister Dearest, exposing her sister's darkest secrets. Alexis finds out about the book, secretly buys the publishing company, and scuttles the project. A resentful Caress offers to help Blake prove that Alexis perjured herself in a court case against him. Blake's brother Ben Carrington has Caress kidnapped and sent back to prison in Caracas; she sends a desperate letter to Blake, but he is unable to free her because of Ben's bribes. Blake sends Dex Dexter and Clay Fallmont to extract her. Once back in Denver, Caress blackmails Emily Fallmont with the secret that Emily once cheated on her husband Buck with Ben, but feels honest regret over doing so. Blake convinces Caress to give up her plan. Emily ultimately confesses her sins, but is hit by a car and killed. Caress leaves town in "The Letter" on a mission to dig up secrets about Ben.

Ben Carrington (Christopher Cazenove, 1986–1987)
Blake's vengeful younger brother, who was cut off by Blake after the death of their mother. In "Ben", Alexis brings him to Denver from Australia to stir up trouble and help her destroy Blake. Even though Ben and Alexis manage to force Blake and Krystle out of the Carrington mansion, Ben eventually reconciles with his brother and, much later, his estranged daughter Leslie. Ben and Emily Fallmont had an affair in their youth, and suspects that Clay may be his son. Ben leaves town in "Shadow Play".

Clay Fallmont (Ted McGinley, 1986–1987)
Son of Senator Buck Fallmont and his wife Emily, and brother of Bart. First appearing in "Masquerade", Clay romances Amanda, and briefly marries Sammy Jo. He is later involved with Leslie Carrington, but when it is revealed he may also be Ben's son (and Leslie's brother), he breaks it off and leaves town in "Shadow Play".

Dana Waring Carrington (Leann Hunley 1986–1988)
Blake's loyal assistant at Denver–Carrington. First appearing in "Reward", she is befriended by Adam, who is working for Alexis and uses Dana to obtain confidential information about Blake's company. The pair soon fall in love, and it is revealed that Dana had followed Adam to Denver from Billings, Montana, where she had loved him from afar. They marry, but Dana's inability to conceive a child places a strain on their relationship. She struggles to keep the secret that her infertility was caused by an abortion in her teens, the result of a one-night stand with Adam when he lived as Michael Torrance (he had been too drunk to remember the encounter). Adam and Dana use a surrogate mother named Karen Atkinson to conceive Adam's child, but the subsequent custody battle when Karen changes her mind tears Adam and Dana's marriage apart for good. Dana leaves Denver in the season nine premiere, "Broken Krystle".

Leslie Carrington (Terri Garber, 1987–1988)
Daughter of Ben Carrington and Melissa Saunders. In "The Rig", Leslie comes to town to confront the father who abandoned her. There she runs into her former flame Dex, and dallies with Michael Culhane. Leslie is later involved with Clay Fallmont, but when it is revealed he may also be Ben's son, he breaks it off and leaves town. After falling into an affair with a married Jeff Colby, Leslie becomes Alexis Colby's protégé, but is fired for also having an affair with Alexis' husband, Sean Rowan. Sean later takes Leslie hostage, raping and beating her when his schemes unravel. She manages to contact her cousin, Steven, who comes for her in "Colorado Roulette", her last appearance in the series.

Sarah Curtis (Cassie Yates, 1987)
Friend of Dex Dexter, whose husband and daughter die in a car crash. Sarah is persuaded to allow her daughter's heart to be transplanted into Blake and Krystle's critically ill young daughter Krystina. She becomes obsessed with Krystina and kidnaps her. However, she eventually recovers with the help of Blake and Krystle.

Sean (Anders) Rowan (James Healey, 1987–1988)
Handsome stranger who saves Alexis from drowning after a car accident in "The Siege". They marry, and Sean insinuates himself into her business, alienating Adam. It is soon revealed that Sean is secretly the son of former Carrington majordomo Joseph Anders and brother of Kirby, bent on avenging his father and sister, who had been ill-treated by Alexis and the Carringtons. Sean has an affair with Leslie, and schemes to destroy the family. He is killed when a gun goes off during a fight with Dex in "Colorado Roulette".

Jeremy Van Dorn (Jeroen Krabbé, 1991)
Head of a large public relations firm. In Dynasty: The Reunion, Van Dorn becomes involved with Alexis, but is soon revealed to be the head of the Consortium, an international criminal organization that had illegally taken control of Denver-Carrington while Blake was in prison. Van Dorn is eventually discovered by Jeff and Adam, but not before trying to kill Alexis. He appears to be arrested by the police, but the officers turn out to be disguised members of the Consortium.

== Recurring ==
Jeanette Robbins (Virginia Hawkins, 1981–1989; 1991)
Longtime Carrington housekeeper. First appearing in "The Honeymoon", Jeanette is a friend to Krystle from the beginning, and very close to the family. In season one, she is called upon by Jake Dunham to give evidence against Blake at Ted Dinard's murder trial, although she is visibly uncomfortable doing so. In the third season, Jeanette takes charge of L.B. in the nursery while Jeff and Fallon interview nannies; she confesses to Kirby Anders that while she enjoys the work she is tired easily; this spurs Kirby to take on the role of nanny. In season six, Alexis offers Jeanette $100 a week for information on Krystle, who she suspects of abusing L.B. (it is actually Rita Lesley posing as Krystle). Jeanette declines the offer, as she cannot bring herself to betray her employer. In season seven, Jeanette helps Blake and Krystle move into the Carlton Hotel once Alexis evicts them from the mansion. When Alexis finds out, she sacks Jeanette with two months' severance pay, which causes Amanda to walk in protest. She is later hired by Krystle as lady's maid. When Matthew Blaisdel abducts the Carringtons and their household staff in season eight, Jeanette and butler Gerard admit their feelings for each other. Jeanette also appears in Dynasty: The Reunion.

Gerard (William Beckley, 1983–1989; 1991)
Longtime Carrington butler. First appearing in "The Note", he takes over as majordomo after Joseph Anders commits suicide. When Matthew Blaisdel abducts the Carringtons and their household staff in season eight, Gerard and Jeanette admit their feelings for each other. Gerard also appears in Dynasty: The Reunion.

Hilda Gunnerson (Betty Harford, 1981–1987; 1991)
Longtime Carrington cook. First appearing in "The Honeymoon", Hilda Nielsen Gunnerson (usually referred to as "Mrs. Gunnerson") is close to the family, and according to a season two episode was hired by Alexis while she was still married to Blake. When Blake introduces Krystle to the household staff in season one, he says that Mrs. Gunnerson's "several relatives" eat well at his expense. In season two, Alexis asks Mrs. Gunnerson to order her some glassware and champagne for her art studio, having moved in, and tells the cook to take two bottles home for her and her husband, Bjorn. Mrs. Gunnerson has three sons: Bjorn Jr, Donald and Britt. In season seven, Alexis gives Mrs. Gunnerson a $1000-a-month raise, on the condition that she reports any staff showing disloyalty to her; when she shows reluctance, Alexis reminds her of the time she paid for Mrs. Gunnerson's son's medical expenses, saving his life. Mrs. Gunnerson is among the household staff abducted by Matthew Blaisdel along with the Carringtons in season eight. She also appears in Dynasty: The Reunion.

Andrew Laird (Peter Mark Richman, 1981–1984)
Former criminal attorney who is Blake's shrewd and levelheaded chief legal counsel.

D.A. Jake Dunham (Brian Dennehy, 1981)
Prosecutor who tries Blake's case regarding the death of Ted Dinard. Once a promising football player, Blake wanted him for his football team.

Ted Dinard (Mark Withers, 1981)
Steven Carrington's former boyfriend from New York City. He comes to Denver in "Fallon's Wedding", hoping to lure Steven back to resume their relationship. They eventually agree not to reconcile, but Steven's father Blake witnesses their farewell hug and mistakes it for a romantic embrace in "The Separation". As Blake pulls Ted off Steven, Ted falls, hits his head on the edge of a fireplace hearth, and dies. Blake is charged with his murder, and the subsequent trial nearly tears the Carrington family apart.

Ray Bonning (Lance LeGault, 1981–1982)
Executive vice-president of Rhinewood Enterprises.

Neal McVane (Paul Burke, 1982–1984; 1987–1988)
Troublesome but powerful congressman who is Alexis' former flame. Blake seeks McVane's help in "Kirby", and Alexis tries to convince him not to aid Blake. In 1983, McVane manages to help Blake stall the takeover of Denver-Carrington by ColbyCo that Alexis has orchestrated, and a furious Alexis leaks McVane's secrets to the press and ruins him. He threatens to kill her; soon after, someone nearly does, but the culprit is revealed to be Carrington majordomo Joseph Anders. Later, in 1984, McVane enlists the help of Krystle's first husband, Mark, to blackmail Alexis. Mark is later pushed to his death from Alexis' penthouse balcony, and she is arrested after Steven admits he saw her do it from a distance. In "Amanda" it is revealed that Mark was murdered by McVane, dressed in a wig and one of Alexis' gowns to frame her. Out of prison, McVane returns in 1987 to blackmail Adam, with evidence that Adam is actually Michael Torrance and not a Carrington, claiming that the real Adam Carrington died the day he was kidnapped. A tormented Adam eventually comes clean to Blake and Alexis; they prove their love for him by refusing to look at his paternity test results, and they adopt him as Adam Carrington. Later in the 1988 episode "The Scandal", McVane leads Adam to the source of the story about Adam actually being Michael Torrance. Adam discovers that it was fabricated, and that he really is Blake and Alexis' son.

Morgan Hess (Hank Brandt, 1982–1988)
Shady private investigator who wears loud sport coats. He is initially hired by Alexis in "Sammy Jo and Steven Marry" to dig into Krystle's past, and discovers that Krystle is technically still married to her first husband, Mark Jennings. In season four, Sammy Jo hires Hess to fool Claudia into believing her deceased husband Matthew is still alive, hoping that unraveling Claudia's sanity would help Sammy Jo take custody of her son Danny from Steven and Claudia. He also plots with Sammy Jo to split up Blake and Krystle using compromising photos. Hess last appears in "Body Trouble".

Blake (Little Blake/L.B.) Colby (Infant, 1982; then Timothy McNutt, 1984–1985; then Ashley Mutrux, 1985; then Brandon Bluhm, 1987–1989, 1991)
Son of Jeff and Fallon. Born in "The Baby" (1982), Little Blake is kidnapped from the mansion in "The Cliff", and recovered in "The Wedding". The character moves to The Colbys with Jeff and Fallon, played during its run, portrayed by Ashley Mutrux (1985–1986) and Brandon Bluhm (1986–1987). L.B. returns to Dynasty in 1987, and also appears in Dynasty: The Reunion.

Steven Daniel (Danny) Carrington Jr. (Infant, 1982; then Matthew Lawrence, 1984–1985; then Jameson Sampley, 1985–1988; then Justin Burnette, 1988–1989, 1991)
Son of Steven and Sammy Jo. With Steven presumed dead in an oil rig explosion in the Java Sea, Sammy Jo appears at the Carrington mansion in "Samantha" (1982), with a baby she claims is her son with Steven. More interested in a modeling career than being a mother, Sammy Jo leaves baby Danny with Blake and Krystle, as Alexis pays Sammy Jo to leave town. Steven turns up alive, and takes custody of his son. He and Blake soon get into a legal battle over the child, worsened by Sammy Jo's false testimony against Steven. Marrying Claudia assures Steven's victory. Sammy Jo returns in 1984 seeking custody, and soon kidnaps Danny. Adam helps retrieve the child in Los Angeles. Later, young Danny becomes close to Claudia, and their relationship continues after Steven and Claudia divorce. A returning Sammy Jo again wants to be involved in her son's life, and later proves herself to the family and Steven. Danny also appears in Dynasty: The Reunion.

Rashid Ahmed (John Saxon, 1982–1984)
Dark, dashing oil sheik and occasional lover to Alexis. He owns a luxurious Italian villa, among other things. He consults Blake to free up his trapped oil tankers in 1982. Rashid double-crosses Blake out of the China Sea oil deal in 1984. He is shot and killed by Turkish authorities during a botched deal with Adam Carrington.

Tony Driscoll (Paul Keenan, 1982–1984)
The Carrington groundsman.

Marcia (Sally Kemp, 1982–1984)
Blake's secretary at Denver–Carrington.

Gerald Wilson (John Larch, 1982–1988)
Attorney to Cecil Colby.

Dr. Jonas Edwards (Robert Symonds, 1982–1987)
Father figure to Adam when he was growing up as Michael Torrance.

Chris Deegan (Grant Goodeve, 1983; 1987)
Lawyer and college friend of Steven. Introduced in the 1983 episode "The Vote", Chris welcomes Steven and his infant son Danny into his home after Steven has a falling out with Blake. Blake later learns that Steven is living with Chris, who is also gay. Suspecting that the men are more than friends, Blake decides to sue Steven for custody of Danny. Chris represents Steven at the custody trial, where Blake argues that a homosexual cannot be a good parent. Thanks to Blake's criminal past and Steven's last minute marriage to Claudia, the couple are awarded custody of Danny in "Tender Comrades". Chris later appears in the 1987 episode "The Spoiler".

Sam Dexter (David Hedison, 1983; Ed Nelson, 1987)
Dex Dexter's father, a businessman at Dexter International, board member at Denver-Carrington, and friend to Blake. Sam slept with Alexis Colby while she was married to Blake. In 1983, Sam suffers a heart attack and Dex takes over his seat on the board.

Gordon Wales (James Sutorius, 1984–1988)
Reporter for World Finance magazine who interviews Blake Carrington in March 1984. He is later hired by Alexis to work at the Denver Mirror.

Luke Fuller (Billy Campbell, 1984–1985)
Steven's soft-spoken coworker at ColbyCo, hired by Alexis in "The Secret". As circumstances keep throwing them together, Steven makes it clear to both his wife Claudia and Luke that his and Luke's relationship is purely platonic. Still, Claudia cannot ignore the warning signs, and Steven cannot ignore his attraction to Luke. He and Luke eventually begin a relationship, and Claudia finds solace with Adam. Later, when the entire family (including Luke) travels to Moldavia for Amanda's royal wedding, terrorists attack the chapel. Luke is shot in the head trying to protect Claudia from gunfire. He dies in Steven's arms in "The Aftermath".

Dean Caldwell (Richard Hatch, 1984–1985)
Handsome art gallery owner who takes an interest in Claudia Blaisdel in 1984.

Nicole Simpson (Susan Scannell, 1984–1985)
Ex–wife of Peter De Vilbis, a bored but scheming socialite from Los Angeles who has an affair with Jeff Colby after Fallon Colby disappears. She marries Jeff in a quickie ceremony out of state, but the marriage is later invalidated.

Krystina Carrington (Cassidy Lewis 1984–1985; then Jessica Player, 1987–1989, 1991)
Blake and Krystle's daughter. She is born in "Krystina" (1984), but suffers from respiratory distress syndrome and must remain hospitalized for a time. Years later in "The Test" (1987), Krystina is diagnosed with a heart condition that will prove fatal if she does not have a transplant. In "The Surgery", she receives the heart of a young girl named Kathy who was rendered brain dead in a car crash. Kathy's mother, Sarah Curtis, develops an unhealthy attachment to Krystina, and abducts her in the distraught delusion that Krystina is Kathy. Krystina is recovered, and Blake and Krystle help Sarah get mental treatment. In the 1989 series finale "Catch 22", Fallon and Krystina are trapped in an abandoned mine on the Carrington estate. Krystina also appears in Dynasty: The Reunion.

Tom Carrington (Harry Andrews, 1985)
Blake and Ben's father. In "The Will", Blake, Alexis, and Dominique visit a dying Tom in Jakarta, Indonesia. An oil, timber, and rubber tycoon, Tom meets his illegitimate daughter Dominique for the first time, and she convinces him to accept her. Tom dies, but not before including Dominique in his will. Tom's $500 million fortune is split between Blake, Alexis, and Dominique, which infuriates Alexis. In "Sins of the Father" (1989), Blake admits that Tom had been given a priceless Frederick Stahl art collection in the early 1950s for taking men accused of Nazi war crimes on his shipping routes. In the 1989 series finale "Catch 22", Tom is revealed to have disposed of Roger Grimes's body.

King Galen of Moldavia (Joel Fabiani, 1985–1986)
In "Life and Death", Alexis visits her old friend, King Galen of Moldavia, as part of her plan to wed her daughter Amanda to Galen's son, Prince Michael. After a somewhat volatile courtship, Amanda and Michael wed in Moldavia, with all the Carringtons present. However, a political coup comes to fruition and terrorists, bent on seizing the country, attack the ceremony. Michael and the Carringtons are eventually allowed to leave Moldavia, and are told that Galen has been killed. A very-much-alive Galen is rescued by Alexis and Dex. Paralyzed, Galen moves ahead with plans to reclaim his crown. He manipulates Alexis to gain necessary funds, coming between her and Dex and offering to make her his queen. When Alexis uncovers Galen's schemes and finds out that he has recovered from his paralysis and has been faking it, she sends him packing in "The Divorce".

Rita Lesley (Linda Evans, 1985–1986)
Actress whom Sammy Jo recruits to pose as Krystle.

Nick Kimball (Richard Lawson, 1985–1986)
Well-reputed drill foreman hired by Blake in 1986. He is the son of one of Blake's oil-business colleagues, and a graduate cum laude from the Colorado School of Mines. Nick becomes the lover and eventual fiance to Dominique.

Bart Fallmont (Kevin Conroy, 1985–1986; Cameron Watson, 1991)
Successful lawyer and arrogant son of Senator Buck Fallmont and his wife Emily. Introduced in "The Roadhouse", Bart spars with both Steven and Adam in business, but Bart and Steven find that they are attracted to each other. Meanwhile, Adam blackmails Bart, threatening to publicly reveal Fallmont's homosexuality. When Bart refuses to cooperate, Adam reveals his secret. Much to Steven's disappointment, Bart leaves town. Years later in Dynasty: The Reunion, Steven and Bart are living in Washington, D.C., and are in a committed relationship. Blake visits after he is released from prison, but Stevens' reception is icy. Steven and Bart eventually reunite with the rest of the Carringtons at the mansion in Colorado.

Elena, Duchess of Branagh (Kerry Armstrong, 1985–1986)
Former flame of Prince Michael.

Jonathan Lake (Calvin Lockhart, 1985–1986)
United States State Department official who dates Dominique.

Jackie Deveraux (Troy Beyer, 1986–1987)
Dominique's daughter. Jackie comes to Denver in "The Accident". Dominique's lover Garrett is immediately convinced that Jackie is his daughter, from years before when he and Dominique had an affair while he was married to someone else. Jackie later runs away when she learns the truth, and Dominique admits to Garrett that he is indeed Jackie's father in "The Vote". Dominique and Garrett decide to marry, but soon break up; he leaves town in the sixth season finale "The Choice (a.k.a.) The Vendetta" as the La Mirage hotel catches fire. Jackie is injured in the blaze, and later in "The Arraignment" remembers enough about the fire to exonerate Blake from accusations of arson. She last appears in "The Affair".

Emily Fallmont (Pat Crowley, 1986–1987)
Wife of Senator Buck Fallmont and the mother of Clay and Bart. Introduced in "Masquerade", Emily is desperate to preserve the secret that she had an affair with Ben early in her marriage, which casts doubt on Clay's paternity. However, this revelation is what Blake needs to prove that Ben and Alexis have perjured themselves in a case against him. Pushed to the limit by Caress Morell's blackmail, Emily finally writes a confession and begs Blake to use it. Her secret comes out and devastates Buck, but he forgives her as she dies after being hit by a car in "The Letter".

Buck Fallmont (Richard Anderson, 1986–1987)
Seasoned senator married to Emily, and the father of Clay and Bart. Introduced in "Masquerade", Buck has a problem with alcohol and a long-simmering hatred for the Carringtons. He strongly disapproves of his son Bart's homosexuality, and later disowns Clay after he finds out about his wife's indiscretion. Buck last appears in "Shadow Play".

Karen Atkinson (Stephanie Dunnam, 1987–1988)
Surrogate mother contracted by Adam and Dana in their pursuit of a child.

Jesse Atkinson (Christopher Allport, 1987–1988)
Karen's estranged husband, and father of her other children.

Josh Harris (Tom Schanley, 1987–1988)
Troubled player on a Carrington–owned football team; briefly involved with Sammy Jo.

Dr. Harold Chadway (Alan Haufrect, 1987)
Doctor who appeared for Krystina's health.

Lauren Colby (Jenny Pharis, 1988–1989; then Brittany Alyse Smith, 1991)
Daughter of Jeff and Fallon. Lauren is born in the 1987 The Colbys episode "Guilty Party". Before her birth, Fallon is unsure whether the baby's father is Jeff or Miles Colby. Lauren first appears on Dynasty in the 1988 episode "Broken Krystle", when Fallon is on the phone with Alexis. Lauren also appears in Dynasty: The Reunion.

John Zorelli (Ray Abruzzo, 1988–1989)
Police detective who becomes involved with Fallon while investigating the long–ago murder of Roger Grimes, for which Blake is a suspect.

Joanna Sills (Kim Terry, 1988–1989)
Woman who brokers the sale of the Carlton Hotel from Alexis Colby to Sable. She becomes romantically involved with Dex and Adam.

James Rayford (Robert Harland, 1988)
Candidate who runs against Blake and Alexis for Governor of Colorado, and ultimately wins.

Rudy Richards (Lou Beatty Jr., 1988–1989)
Detective at the Harmon Springs Police Department and partner to John Zorelli.

Virginia Metheny (Liza Morrow, 1988–1989)
Krystle's cousin who raised herself after her father died. She was once involved with Dex as a teen prostitute, and later becomes involved with Adam.

Father Tanner McBride (Kevin Bernhardt, 1989)
Young priest to whom Sammy Jo is attracted.

Captain William Handler (John Brandon, 1988–1989)
Corrupt cop who shoots Blake after his schemes are exposed in the series finale, and who is himself subsequently shot and killed by John Zorelli.
