= Fallon Carrington =

- Dynasty character
- Pamela Sue Martin as Fallon Carrington
- Portrayed by: Pamela Sue Martin (1981–1984); Emma Samms (1985–1991); Cheyenne Fitch (1989 flashbacks)
- Duration: 1981–1989, 1991
- First appearance: "Oil" (1981)
- Last appearance: "Catch 22" (1989)
- Created by: Richard and Esther Shapiro
- Spin-off appearances: The Colbys (1985–1987); Dynasty: The Reunion (1991)
In-universe information
- Other names: Randall Adams
- Occupation: Interior designer (1987); Manager of La Mirage hotel (1982–1984); Denver-Carrington Board of Directors (1987–1989)
- Parents: Blake Carrington; Alexis Colby
- Stepparents: Krystle Carrington; Cecil Colby; Dex Dexter; Sean Rowan
- Brothers: Adam Carrington; Steven Carrington
- Sisters: Amanda Carrington
- Half-sisters: Krystina Carrington
- Spouse: Jeff Colby; Miles Colby
- Children: L.B. Colby; Lauren Colby
- Grandparents: Tom Carrington; Ellen Carrington; Steven Morell
- Aunts and uncles: Dominique Deveraux; Ben Carrington; Caress Morell
- Nieces and nephews: Danny Carrington
- First cousins: Leslie Carrington; Jackie Deveraux

Fallon Carrington is a fictional character from the ABC television series Dynasty and its spin-off The Colbys. Created by Richard and Esther Shapiro, the role of Fallon was originated by Pamela Sue Martin in the show's first episode in 1981, and Martin left at the end of the fourth season in 1984. Fallon was recast with Emma Samms in 1985, and the character was spun off onto a companion series called The Colbys. After the cancellation of the second series, Fallon (portrayed by Samms) returned to Dynasty in 1987, and remained on the series until its finale in 1989. Samms later reprised the role for the 1991 miniseries Dynasty: The Reunion. Elizabeth Gillies plays Fallon in The CW's 2017 reboot series Dynasty.

Fallon is the daughter of oil baron Blake Carrington and his first wife, Alexis, portrayed by John Forsythe and Joan Collins in the original series. Initially a self-indulgent troublemaker constantly at odds with her father's second wife, Krystle (Linda Evans), Fallon navigates a series of romantic entanglements that includes marriages to Jeff Colby (John James) and his half-brother and cousin, Miles Colby (Maxwell Caulfield).

== Original series ==
=== Characterization ===
Fallon is introduced in 1981 as a fiery heiress as intelligent and business savvy as her millionaire father Blake Carrington, but not taken seriously by him because she is a woman. With a place at the family company Denver-Carrington unavailable to her, Fallon instead indulges herself with multiple lovers and torturing her new stepmother Krystle (Linda Evans). David Hofstede described Martin's Fallon as "a spoiled bitch with an acid tongue whose idea of fun was to sleep with her father's chauffeur". Martin told People in 1982, "Fallon has lovers, but they don't mean anything to her". Actor John James said of the relationship between Fallon and his character, her "loving-but-unloved" husband Jeff Colby, "There's an attraction there in two people who know they're wrong for each other".

Alex Mar wrote for Slate:

The idea of Fallon as a stifled modern woman had no place in the series once Joan Collins joined the cast. With the introduction of Collins as Blake's exuberantly wicked, two-faced ex-wife Alexis, potentially nuanced female characters were reduced to a Madonna/whore dichotomy: You can either be a Krystle (gentle, soft-spoken, essentially good) or an Alexis (scheming, sexual, essentially evil).

Emma Samms said at the time of her hiring, "I'm always going for the sympathetic aspect of a character." She also noted, "I'm not going to sit and watch hours of Pamela Sue so I can reproduce the kind of performance she gave. I want to be accepted as me." According to Samms, before Dynasty's final season, producer David Paulsen asked her what she would like to do with Fallon. She explained in 1989, "I said, 'I'd like to do more humorous stuff and be a bit more realistic character, not always the victim.' And that`s what he did. This year I was allowed to be a more real character."

=== Casting ===
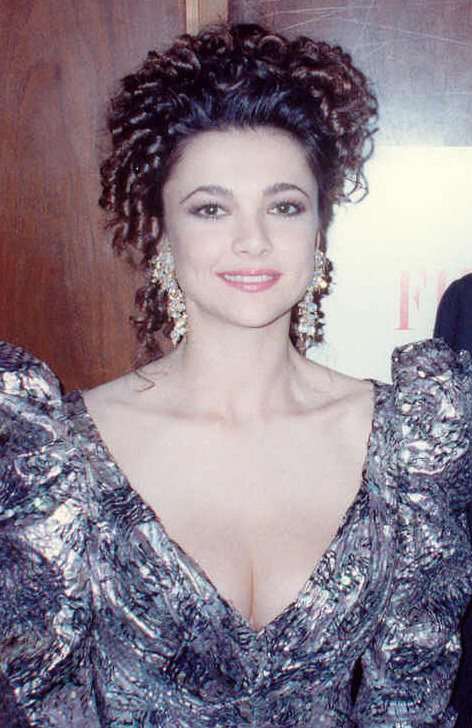
Emma Samms replaced Pamela Sue Martin as Fallon in 1985.

Dynasty debuted in January 1981, with Pamela Sue Martin portraying Fallon. In 2006, she said of Forsythe, "He really was like a father to me. I asked John to walk me down the aisle when I got married in real life, but he said, 'I think maybe you should ask your real dad.' I was just so attached to him." Martin left the series at the end of the fourth season in May 1984. In the storyline, a troubled Fallon leaves Jeff at the altar, and is later presumed dead in an offscreen plane crash. At the time, New York quoted Martin as calling television "limiting". USA Today reported in 2006 that Martin "left Dynasty and acting when she felt her 'glib' character ... had been reduced to 'a victim'." In 2011, she said "I became extremely famous during that time, and it was a little discomforting". Executive producer Aaron Spelling wrote in his 1996 autobiography, "After three seasons, Pamela Sue Martin wanted to leave Dynasty to get married and we didn't stand in her way."

The role was later recast with British actress Emma Samms, and Fallon reappears with amnesia at the end of the fifth season in the April 1985 episode "Kidnapped". In his 2004 television history book What Were They Thinking?, David Hofstede recounted that Samms had been suggested to Spelling by his young daughter, Tori, who was a fan of Samms in her role of Holly Scorpio on the daytime soap opera General Hospital. Samms, who had appeared in two episodes of Spelling's drama series Hotel in 1984 and 1985, met with Dynasty co-creator Esther Shapiro for a non-specific role, which led to her casting as Fallon. Samms said, "The audience was so fond of the character that they were willing to accept a new actress playing the role." She added that the cast was welcoming, explaining "It wasn't as if Pamela Sue had been fired. She left of her own volition, so there were no hard feelings." Samms appeared in eight episodes of the sixth season of Dynasty, and the character was spun off onto a separate series called The Colbys. A main character on The Colbys, Fallon continued to guest star on Dynasty, with Samms appearing in one episode at the end of the sixth season and two episodes of the seventh season. After the cancellation of The Colbys, Fallon (played by Samms) returned to Dynasty for its eighth season in the September 1987 season premiere episode "The Siege". Screening old episodes while developing the ninth season, new executive producer Paulsen felt that Samms was beautiful, but came across as "stiff". He considered trying to bring back Martin, but wanted to first meet with Samms. He said in 2008:

[Samms] came into my office and I said, "My God, this is a beautiful, charming young woman. Bright, intelligent, funny. But none of that's on the screen." ... I asked her why. She said she didn't have anything to work with. And I thought she was right. I thought "If we can capture who Emma really is, then we have a character people will like." So I made some changes in her wardrobe, brought in a coach to get rid of her accent. And decided to give her a love interest who would kind of bring her character down to earth ... So we created the character of [New York cop] Zorelli who came in to investigate the murder of Roger Grimes ... it brought her to a reality that the audience had not seen ... It wasn't very long before she started getting some terrific fan mail. People were starting to love her.

At the end of that 1988–1989 season, Paulsen told a shocked Samms his original plan. He said, "I'm so glad I didn't replace her ... Emma worked out superbly." That season ended up as Dynasty's last. Samms later reprised the role for the 1991 miniseries Dynasty: The Reunion.

In the 1989 episode "Blasts from the Past", Cheyenne Fitch portrayed Fallon as a child.

=== Storylines ===
==== Season 1 ====
As Dynasty begins, spoiled Carrington heiress Fallon is underestimated by—and considered little more than a trophy to—her father, oil baron Blake. Though she is as cunning and intelligent as he is, there are no women in the family business. Still, Fallon is devoted to Blake and is wary and disdainful of his new wife (and former secretary) Krystle. Fallon is also close to her younger brother Steven, who is struggling with his sexual orientation. A promiscuous Fallon resumes her past affair with her father's chauffeur Michael Culhane. She has a flirtatious relationship with Blake's friend and business rival, Cecil Colby, and later agrees to marry Cecil's nephew, Jeff, to secure Cecil's assistance when her father's company runs into financial trouble. A jealous Michael tells Blake about Fallon's arrangement, causing friction between father and daughter. When Jeff learns that his marriage is just part of a business deal, he embarrasses Fallon by drunkenly broadcasting the details to a room full of party guests. Fallon is sympathetic to Jeff, but still does not feel she can return his love. Trying to protect Steven from Blake's wrath, she tries to keep Steven's ex-boyfriend Ted Dinard from contacting him but is unable to keep them apart. When Blake comes upon the two men in an embrace, he pushes Ted away from Steven. Ted falls, hits his head, and dies. Blake is arrested and charged with murder. Fallon lies about her father's mental state on the witness stand, in an attempt to protect him. When a mysterious woman is called into the courtroom, Fallon recognizes the witness as her mother.

==== Season 2 ====
The surprise witness for the prosecution is Fallon's long-absent mother, Alexis. Fallon is furious as Alexis testifies against Blake, who is found guilty but does not have to serve jail time. Fallon is icy and, jealous of her daughter's love for Blake, a spiteful Alexis begins to spread the rumor that he is not Fallon's father. When Krystle announces she is pregnant, Fallon decides that she and Jeff should have a baby as well. Fallon begins an affair with Dr. Nick Toscanni, and Krystle is thrown from a horse in "Viva Las Vegas" and loses her baby. Fallon learns that she is pregnant in "The Mid-East Meeting", but decides to divorce Jeff and have an abortion. Blake finds out and rushes to stop her, but when he arrives he learns that she could not go through with it. Hiding a longstanding grudge against Blake, Nick tries to seduce Krystle while he romances Fallon. His overtures toward Krystle do not go unnoticed by Fallon, who becomes petulant and jealous. She continues to rebuff Alexis despite their mutual dislike of Krystle. In "The Party", Fallon confronts her mother about the rumor that Blake is not her father. While driving together, Alexis reveals that she believes Cecil Colby is Fallon's father, and a horrified Fallon crashes the car. At the hospital, Fallon goes into premature labor and delivers a boy in "The Baby". In "The Gun", Blake demands a blood test which proves that he, not Cecil, is Fallon's father. Fallon and Jeff name their son Blake Carrington Colby, called "Little Blake", but in the 1982 season finale "The Cliff", Fallon discovers that the baby has been kidnapped.

==== Season 3 ====
Claudia Blaisdel, an unstable woman who lost her child, becomes the primary suspect in Little Blake's kidnapping. The baby's nanny, however, also has ties to the disgraced Nick. In a televised plea to return their grandson, Alexis and Blake reveal the shocking secret that their eldest child, Adam, had been kidnapped as an infant and was never returned. The kidnapper turns out to be Alfred Grimes, the father of the man whose affair with Alexis prompted Blake to exile her. Fallon asks for control of Blake's struggling hotel, La Mirada, which she remodels and renames La Mirage. Jeff is upset by Fallon's decision to work and accuses her of neglecting their child. Fallon flirts with Michael Torrance, a handsome stranger who is staying at the hotel, and they share a kiss. In "The Siblings", she is horrified to learn from Alexis that Michael is Adam, Fallon's long lost brother. Fallon hires Mark Jennings as her tennis instructor in "Mark", only to learn that he is Krystle's ex-husband, brought to Denver by Alexis to cause trouble for Blake. Fallon soon begins an affair with Mark, not knowing that he is also having sex with her mother. Meanwhile, finally realizing that Krystle truly loves Blake, Fallon reaches out to her stepmother, and the two mend fences in "Samantha". Fallon hires Joseph's daughter, Kirby, to be her son's nanny. As Fallon's marriage to Jeff deteriorates, she is annoyed by Kirby's obvious designs on Jeff. His behavior becomes more erratic and violent, and he attacks Fallon after finding her in Mark's hotel room. Angry and upset, Fallon decides her marriage is finally over and flies to Haiti for a divorce. She continues her relationship with Mark, while Jeff marries Kirby on the rebound. Alexis tries to coerce Mark to end things with Fallon in "The Vote", but he refuses. In "The Dinner", however, Alexis arranges for Fallon to discover her in Mark's bed. Fallon learns that Jeff's odd behavior was caused by inhaling toxic chemicals in the paint used in his office, and comes to suspect Adam of deliberately causing it.

==== Season 4 ====
Fallon and Jeff travel to Billings, Montana to investigate Adam's past and wind up having sex. They learn that Adam once tried a case in which a worker was poisoned by toxic paint fumes. She reveals the truth to Blake, but Adam has framed Alexis for the crime. Fallon becomes romantically involved with European tycoon Peter De Vilbis, and they soon become engaged. Blake, Jeff, and even Steven's wife Claudia warn her off the smarmy Peter. When one of Blake's prize racehorses is "kidnapped" and held for ransom, Fallon learns that Peter set it up to extort money from Blake. Upset and confused by Peter's betrayal, a despondent Fallon is hit by a car in "The Accident". Suffering a head injury, she is temporarily paralyzed. Fallon suddenly regains her ability to walk in time to save Little Blake from falling into the swimming pool. Although able to walk again, she is plagued by painful headaches and occasional seizures. Fallon and Jeff decide to remarry in "The Birthday", but on the eve of her wedding in "The Nightmare", Fallon suffers a particularly severe headache. After she fails to appear at the altar, Jeff goes to her room to investigate, only to find her wedding dress crumpled in the corner and the room empty. He glances out the window in time to see Fallon's car speeding off into the night. As Fallon speeds down the rainy highway, she screams as she barrels toward an oncoming truck.

==== Season 5 ====
Jeff discovers the wreckage of Fallon's car, but no sign of her. He finds a trucker who gave her a ride to Portland and continues to search for her, suspecting that she is traveling with Peter. In "Fallon", Jeff learns that Peter died when his small twin-engine plane crashed. Investigators tell Jeff that the badly burned remains of a woman were found with him. Jeff goes to make an identification of the body and recognizes Fallon's engagement ring. Heartbroken, Jeff lashes out at her memorial service. Months later, in "Kidnapped", an amnesiac Fallon appears at a Los Angeles police station, calling herself Randall Adams. Desperately trying to learn her identity, she asks about missing person reports and disheartened to learn that no one is looking for her. In the season finale, "Randall" decides to leave Los Angeles, telling a sympathetic police detective that she feels drawn to the mountains—perhaps Denver.

==== Season 6 ====
In "The Aftermath", Fallon notices the name "Miles Colby" in the newspaper and feels a glimmer of recognition. She tracks down and meets Miles, an irresponsible playboy, who is also Jeff's cousin. Miles has no idea that "Randall" is the presumed-dead Fallon, and he quickly falls in love with her. Blake, in a new business deal with Miles' father Jason Colby, invites the Colbys of California to Denver to celebrate in "The Titans". Fallon has a strong reaction as she and Miles arrive at the Carrington mansion, and she insists that they leave immediately. They drive off without going inside, but not before Jeff, who has long suspected that Fallon might be alive, sees her in the courtyard. In the November 20, 1985 episode "The Decision", Jeff vows to find Fallon and never let her go.

==== Season 1 ====
A newly married Miles and Fallon arrive at the Colby mansion in the November 20, 1985 premiere of the spin-off series The Colbys. Jeff is there, but an amnesiac Fallon shows no recognition for him, or her father Blake, in "Conspiracy of Silence". The family decides not to tell Fallon her true identity, and to let her memory return on its own. Jeff, however, tries to subtly jog her memory, and introduces her to her young son L.B. In "The Family Album", she sees herself in a photo album, and L.B. identifies her as "Mommy". Realizing that she is Fallon, she confronts Miles and Jeff. A psychiatrist helps her regain her memory in "A House Divided", and she is torn between her feelings for Miles and Jeff. A patient Miles, also upset by his father's apparent extramarital love for Jeff's mother, finally explodes and rapes Fallon in "Thursday's Child". Fallon flees to Denver in the February 1986 Dynasty episode "Souvenirs", and Miles follows, seeking her forgiveness. Fallon and Miles sign papers annulling their marriage in The Colbys episode "The Pact", and Jeff and Fallon are brought closer when L.B. is hospitalized. She agrees to marry Jeff in "Fallon's Choice", and a devastated Miles uses evidence provided by his mother Sable to remove Jeff from Colby Enterprises by proving in court that his father is not Philip Colby. The plan backfires in "Burden of Proof" when Miles' father Jason declares in open court that he is Jeff's father as well. Fallon and Jeff remarry in "The Wedding", and Miles and Jeff call a truce. In the season one finale "Checkmate", Fallon tells Jeff that she is pregnant, but is soon alarmed to realize that the baby may have been fathered by Miles during the rape.

==== Season 2 ====
Jeff and Fallon tell Miles about their baby in the season 2 premiere "The Gathering Storm", and Fallon admits to a furious Jeff that Miles could be the father in "No Exit". Miles marries a reporter, Channing Carter, who is threatened by Miles' lingering feelings for Fallon. Visiting Denver in the Dynasty episode "Romance", Fallon warns her younger sister Amanda, who is romantically involved with Fallon's former lover Michael Culhane, that Michael is not to be trusted. Sable discovers that Miles may be the father of Fallon's baby in "Bloodlines", and tells him in "Deceptions". Miles and Jeff have a brutal fight, during which Miles is almost killed by falling off the roof of the Colby Tower in "And Baby Makes Four". After Fallon threatens abortion to end the rivalry between Jeff and Miles, she and Jeff resolve to acknowledge Miles' rights should he prove to be the father. Fallon has a medical emergency at the Colby lodge in "Reaching Out", and Channing pretends the phone line is down in hopes that Fallon will lose her baby. The women remain at odds, but just when Channing is trying to make amends in "All Fall Down", Fallon falls down the stairs in a manner which looks like Channing pushed her. Miles is by Fallon's side as she gives birth to a daughter in "Guilty Party"; after a medical scare, the baby is determined to be Jeff's in "Fallon's Baby". Fallon makes friends with Channing and tries to help her with Miles, as Fallon and Jeff are finally happy. In the series finale "Crossroads", Fallon's car suddenly shuts down while she is driving down a deserted road. Leaving her car, she sees a UFO, which she boards before it takes off with her inside.

==== Season 8 ====
In the Dynasty season premiere "The Siege - Part 1", Jeff finds Fallon miles away from her car. In Denver, she eventually confides her UFO story to Jeff, but his disbelief puts a strain on their marriage. Their relationship is put under further pressure as Jeff becomes Blake's campaign manager in his run for governor of Colorado. Jeff's growing closeness to Fallon's cousin Leslie Carrington finally pushes Fallon to ask for a divorce in "The Fair". Blake puts Adam, Fallon, and Steven jointly in charge of Denver-Carrington during his gubernatorial race, and the siblings are soon at odds. Blake is implicated in an illegal weapons deal, but Fallon and Steven retrieve proof that he is innocent in "The Trial". Jeff has been secretly dating Steven's ex-wife Sammy Jo Carrington, and asks her to marry him in "The Proposal". Fallon confronts Jeff and they fall into bed in "Colorado Roulette", after which Sammy Jo arrives with champagne to accept Jeff's proposal.

==== Season 9 ====
Jeff moves forward with his engagement to Sammy Jo but is conflicted over his feelings for Fallon. A body is discovered in a lake on the Carrington property, which turns out to be the decades-old corpse of Alexis' lover, Roger Grimes. In "Alexis in Blunderland", Sammy Jo finds out about Jeff and Fallon's one-night stand. She confronts Fallon and they fight in the mud, eventually realizing that neither of them wants Jeff anymore. Fallon becomes romantically involved with John Zorelli, the police detective investigating the Grimes case. This puts her at odds with Blake, but Zorelli's investigation also makes it difficult for Fallon and the detective to trust each other. In "Blasts from the Past", Fallon recalls that as a child, she killed Grimes to prevent him from attacking an unconscious Alexis. Her grandfather, Tom Carrington, had disposed of the body in a mine under the lake to protect her. In the series finale "Catch 22", Fallon and her half-sister Krystina are trapped in a cave-in inside the mine.

==== The Reunion (1991) ====
Three years later in Dynasty: The Reunion, Fallon is living in California with Miles. After Jeff helps the Carringtons defeat the insidious Consortium, he and Fallon reconcile.

=== Reception ===
People praised Samms as a successful replacement in 1985, but David Hofstede called her the "Worst. Recast. Ever." in 2004, blaming the producers rather than Samms. A 1985 article in The Hollywood Reporter criticized the recast, and a spokesman for the show told Redbook, "People have gotten hung up on the fact that Emma doesn't look anything like Pamela Sue. But the creators said, 'Look, that's not what we wanted to do. We needed someone who could capture the character.'" Hofstede wrote that "Samms never settled into the role, and could only make the best of a bad situation as her character was dropped into one ridiculous plotline after another."

== Reboot ==
Fallon Carrington
- Dynasty character
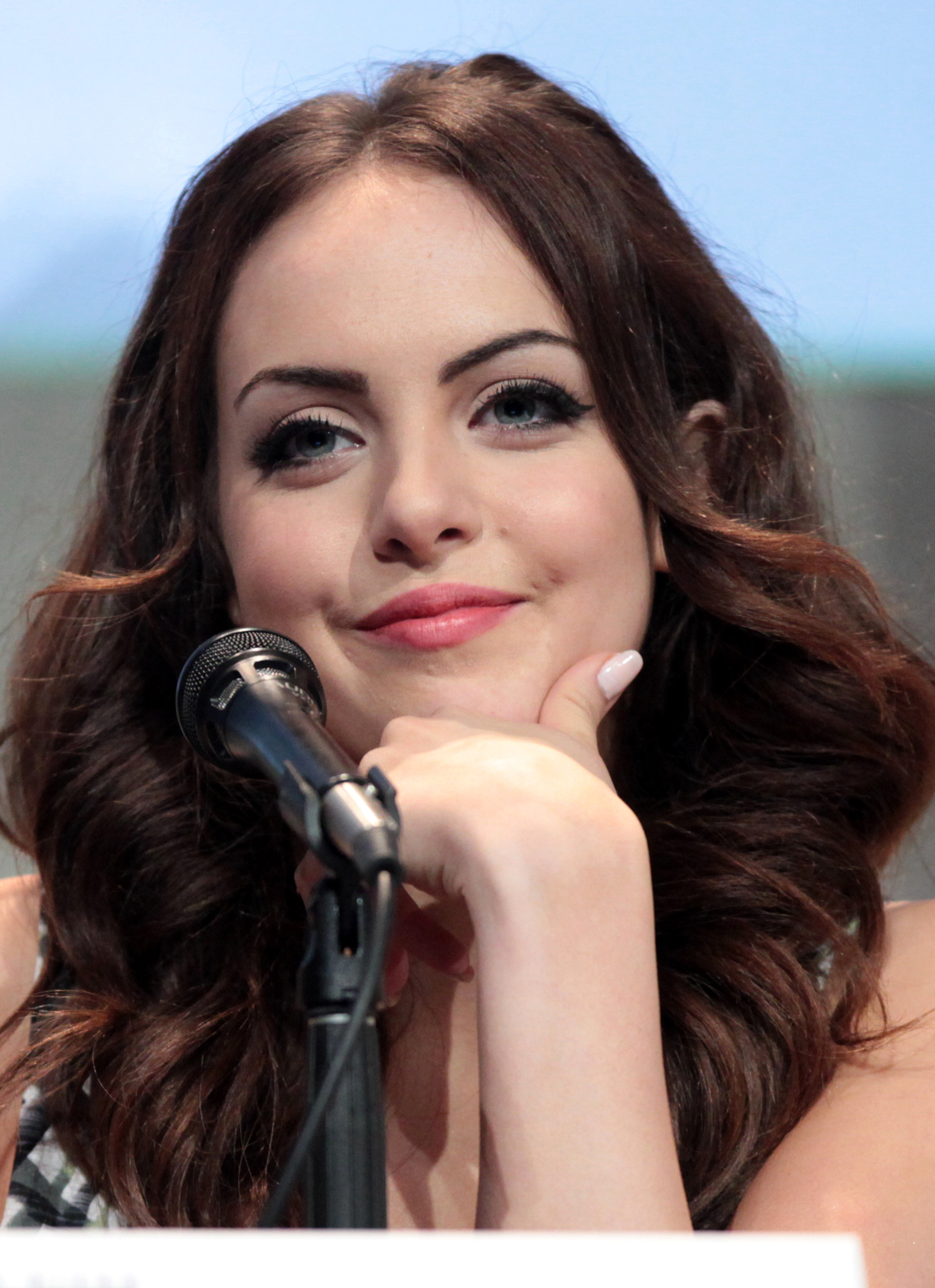
- Elizabeth Gillies portrays Fallon Carrington in the 2017 reboot series
- Portrayed by: Elizabeth Gillies
- Duration: 2017–2022
- First appearance: "I Hardly Recognized You"; October 11, 2017
- Last appearance: "Catch 22"; September 16, 2022
- Created by: Richard and Esther Shapiro
In-universe information
- Occupation: Head of Acquisitions at Carrington Atlantic; CEO of Morell Green Energy Corp; CEO of Carrington Atlantic; CEO of Femperial Publishing; CEO of Carrington United
- Parents: Blake Carrington; Alexis Carrington Colby
- Stepparents: Celia Machado a.k.a. Cristal Flores; Cristal Jennings; Jeff Colby; Dex Dexter
- Brothers: Adam Carrington
- Sisters: Amanda Carrington
- Half-brothers: Steven Carrington
- Spouse: Liam Ridley (m. 2021)
- Children: Lauren Morell Carrington Ridley
- Grandparents: Thomas Carrington; Evelyn Carrington
- Aunts and uncles: Dominique Deveraux; Ben Carrington
- First cousins: Juliette Carrington; Jeff Colby; Monica Colby; Unnamed cousin (via Ben)

A pilot for a Dynasty reboot for The CW was announced in September 2016. Elizabeth Gillies was cast as Fallon in February 2017, and the series premiered on October 11, 2017. In the new Dynasty, Fallon meets—and immediately loathes—her billionaire father Blake's fiancée Cristal, a rival employee at the family company. The reboot establishes the character's full name as Fallon Morell Carrington.

=== Characterization and development ===
Executive producer Josh Schwartz said of Fallon:

Even when you watch the original, Fallon is a character who feels as if she can exist in 2017. She just pops off the screen, and she can take on Krystle, who, in the original, was pure and the moral center of the show. With this new Cristal, we liked the idea of not letting her be quite as pure and raising some questions about her past and having her stir the pot—making her more formidable. That really let us lean into this rivalry between Fallon and Cristal.

Alexandra Jacobs of The New York Times noted that in the new series, "Fallon has been upgraded from a somewhat lost soul, climbing in and out of beds and winsomely up trees...to an ambitious businesswoman, still sleeping with the chauffeur but now also leaning in with a steely glare." Gillies said, "I'm not playing Alexis but Fallon has inherited a lot of her gusto...She's less passive than at least Pamela Sue Martin was—she had a relaxed nature. I wouldn’t say that my Fallon is as relaxed, for better or for worse. I think she's got a lot more bite." She said, "I wanted to bring my own thing to her. I think she's feisty as ever." Calling Fallon "strong-willed" and "ambitious", Gillies later added, "She's a force of nature...Fallon will go as far as she needs to go to get exactly what she wants. She's her father's daughter, so she's a master manipulator. But I do believe she has a conscience." Ahead of season two, Executive producer Sallie Patrick said, "Pamela Sue Martin was fantastic on the original series, and I always loved her character, but at the same time there wasn’t much there [for her to do]. She was promiscuous, and Daddy's girl, and a troublemaker for sure, but we've really enjoyed adding layers to that character in our first season, and this season, especially, she's become more complex and flawed, and the glue of the family."

Gillies received the script for Dynasty while in the hospital having her appendix removed, and was offered the role of Fallon Carrington during her screen test. Gillies said of her character in an interview with Euphoria, "Fallon is almost like a caricature, and I play her really big, and I don't think I get to do that on any other show. I'm aware of what show I'm on. I'm hyper-aware of it."

=== Storylines ===
==== Season one ====
In the premiere episode "I Hardly Recognized You", heiress Fallon Carrington is unhappy to find her billionaire father Blake engaged to Cristal Flores. Fallon's plan to drive a wedge between them backfires, pushing up the wedding and securing Cristal the promotion to chief operating officer Fallon wanted for herself. Feeling underappreciated by Blake, Fallon sets herself up as his business rival, backed by Blake's nemesis, Jeff Colby. She is also sexually involved with the Carrington chauffeur, Michael Culhane. In "Guilt is for Insecure People", Blake blocks Fallon's use of the Carrington name for her new business venture, so she looks for leverage over him. She leaks a sex video of Cristal and her former lover Matthew Blaisdel to the press in "Private as a Circus". After her overconfidence costs her a lucrative contract, Fallon realizes she has to accept Jeff's input as well as his money. Blake learns that Fallon leaked Cristal's video in "Company Slut", and kicks her out of the mansion. In "I Exist Only for Me", Fallon is jealous that Michael is dating Kori Rucks, but their relationship withstands Fallon's meddling. Exiled from the Carrington Thanksgiving celebration by Blake, Fallon appears at Michael's church congregation dinner and meets his parents in "A Taste of Your Own Medicine". In "The Best Things in Life", Michael's relationship with Kori implodes over his lingering feelings for Fallon, who rebounds with Jeff. Fallon has a falling out with her best friend, Jeff's sister Monica Colby, in "Rotten Things". In "A Well-Dressed Tarantula", Fallon overcomes her reluctance to fully commit herself and her money to Jeff, but he is only marrying Fallon to secure her assets—especially her shares in Carrington Atlantic—for himself. Fallon helps Blake and Cristal turn the tables on Cristal's criminal brother-in-law Alejandro Raya, but is in turn abducted by Cristal's sister, Iris. Alejandro and Iris hold Fallon for ransom in "I Answer to No Man", and a captive Cristal helps Fallon escape.

In "Nothing but Trouble", Monica manipulates Fallon into accepting Jeff's marriage proposal, but Fallon discovers Jeff's duplicity and enlists Michael to help her against the Colbys. Their attempt to erase the data Jeff has stolen from the Carrington server fails in "The Gospel According to Blake Carrington", and Jeff's father Cesil Colby reveals to Fallon the crimes that Blake has committed against the Colbys. In "Our Turn Now", the Carringtons proceed with preparations for Fallon's wedding to Jeff as a distraction from their second attempt to erase Jeff's server. Jeff presents Fallon with full ownership of their company Morell Co and a plan for them to exchange 25% of Carrington Atlantic and Colby. On the eve of the wedding, Fallon asks Michael to marry her at the city hall, but he refuses, not wanting something so important to be part of a Carrington plot. With Fallon and Jeff at the altar and the server still not breached, Blake tries to stop the ceremony, but Fallon shuts him down. Afterward, she reveals to the stunned Colbys and her family that the marriage is invalid because she married someone else, Liam Ridley, the night before. Jeff's claim to 25% of Carrington Atlantic is therefore null and void, but Fallon now owns 25% of Colby. Jeff and Fallon's feud goes public in "Poor Little Rich Girl". Blake apologizes to Fallon and Steven for manipulating them, and his long-absent ex-wife Alexis—Fallon and Steven's mother—reappears. Fallon makes overtures to connect with her mother in "Enter Alexis", and Alexis tells Fallon that Blake bribed a judge to seize custody and exile her. Fallon soon discovers, however, that Alexis has not been living a life of luxury abroad, but is housed in a trailer nearby, and has stayed in touch with Steven. A furious Fallon confronts Alexis, and their catfight takes them into the pool. In "Don't Con a Con Artist", Steven refuses to believe Fallon's claim that Alexis is trying to sabotage Steven's engagement until Fallon manipulates Alexis into confessing. Fallon agrees to a date with Liam in "Use or Be Used", but cuts him loose when Alexis reveals that Liam is a journalist named Jack Lowden writing a tell-all. Fallon and Cristal work together to secure leverage over Blake in "A Line from the Past". Intending to publicly force her father to take responsibility for an environmental scandal he covered up, Fallon is dumbstruck when Blake announces her promotion to COO in Cristal's place. In "Trashy Little Tramp", Blake thwarts Fallon's plans for Carrington Atlantic. She visits Claudia looking for incriminating information on Blake, which she uses in a secret meeting with the Carrington Atlantic board. In "Dead Scratch", Fallon is named Carrington Atlantic's CEO, while Jeff and Monica reveal their Carrington heritage as the children of Blake's half-sister, and declare their intention to force a sale of the company. The Carringtons are trapped in the burning stable house during Steven and Sam's wedding, but Michael rescues Blake, Fallon, and Sam.

==== Season two ====
In the season two premiere episode, "Twenty-Three Skidoo", Fallon resumes her relationship with Michael but still has to pretend to be married to Liam to convince Liam's uncle, Max, to buy Carrington Atlantic. Max threatens to call off the deal if Fallon does not have sex with him in "Ship of Vipers", but he dies during a tryst with a prostitute Fallon hires to impersonate her. Meanwhile, Michael retrieves a signed document of the sale of Carrington Atlantic. The only copy Max Van Kirk signed before his death. Unbeknownst to Fallon, Michael has put himself on the line to get that copy for her. Liam, seeing that he may not have any chance with Fallon anymore, now that the company has been sold, releases photos of Fallon and Michael to the media. This does not look good on Fallon's image as she is supposedly married to Liam to the world. Fallon then plans a divorce party for herself and Liam, claiming it would stop the rumors. Liam confessed that he leaked the pictures because he is fighting for her. He gives a speech about how he hates (loves) her, and Fallon kisses him. She flees the scene and Liam goes after her. They are making out when Fallon sees Michael on the CCTV. Colby walks in on them. Liam storms out. Fallon tells Colby that she is confused because Michael is keeping secrets. Jeff Colby tells Fallon that Michael is doing right by her. Because he knows that Michael decided to work with Ada just to save Fallon and get her the document signed by Max Van Kirk. Fallon decides to tell Liam off. She tells him that what she has with Culhane is real. Liam tells her not to call him again.

=== Reception ===
James Poniewozik of The New York Times wrote that "Gillies seizes the screen as the lusty, ambitious Fallon." Darren Franich of Entertainment Weekly noted that "Elizabeth Gillies channels [Joan] Collins' carnivorous ambition and Leighton Meester's imperial pout."

Hedy Phillips of Euphoria wrote, "Though the whole cast has come together to put a new spin on this campy classic, it's star Liz Gillies who has brought Fallon Carrington to life and made this reboot into something truly special."
