= Karen Cellini =

American actress (born 1958)

Karen Cellini (born May 13, 1958, in Philadelphia, Pennsylvania), is an American multidisciplinary live performance artist, producer, writer, and activist. As an actress, she is known for portraying Amanda Carrington in season seven of the 1980s prime time drama Dynasty in 1986.

== Career ==
Cellini played Amanda Carrington in the 1980s prime time drama Dynasty in 1986, succeeding Catherine Oxenberg in the role. She originally auditioned for the role of Channing Carter in season two of The Colbys before being offered the role of Amanda. Amanda was written out of the series after 13 episodes featuring Cellini.

In 2005, Cellini starred as Liz Mason in the horror film Seriously Twisted.

== Personal life ==
Cellini has a twin sister named Kate.
