= Betty Harford =

American actress (1927–2025)

- Born: January 28, 1927; New York City, U.S.
- Died: November 2, 2025 (aged 98); Santa Barbara, California, U.S.
- Occupation: Actress
- Years active: 1951–1991

Betty Harford (January 28, 1927 – November 2, 2025) was an American actress. She appeared in numerous classic television shows such as Gunsmoke, The Alfred Hitchcock Hour, The Paper Chase and Dynasty.

== Career ==
Harford appeared in numerous John Houseman theatrical productions and in the High Valley Theater of Iris Tree.

She appeared in episodes of Alfred Hitchcock Presents, Gunsmoke, Dr. Kildare, The Twilight Zone, The Big Valley and The Paper Chase.

In the 1959 film The Wild and the Innocent, Harford was Ms. Forbes, caring after Sandra Dee's character. Christopher Isherwood found her acting in the 1965 movie Inside Daisy Clover, where she played the sister, Gloria, of Natalie Wood's lead character, as "too much bigger than life, like an actress out of the Moscow Art Theatre."

Harford had the recurring role of cook Hilda Gunnerson in the soap opera Dynasty, appearing in the series throughout its nine-year run from 1981 to 1989, and reprising the part for Dynasty: The Reunion in 1991.

She was Mrs Nottingham, the "ever-efficient secretary" of Professor Charles Kingsfield, in the series The Paper Chase, during its 1978–79 season, and when the show was brought back by Showtime in 1983.

== Personal life and death ==
Harford was married to California sculptor Oliver Andrews. They had a son they named Chris (born September 29, 1952), and separated in the late 1970s. She lived with Hungarian actor Alex de Naszody, until his death.

Harford died in Santa Barbara, California, on November 2, 2025, at the age of 98.

== Selected filmography ==
- Alfred Hitchcock Presents (1955) (Season 1 Episode 12: "Santa Claus and the Tenth Avenue Kid") as Doris
- Alfred Hitchcock Presents (1957) (Season 2 Episode 18: "The Manacled") as Waitress
- The Alfred Hitchcock Hour (1964) (Season 2 Episode 26: "Ten Minutes from Now") as Museum Patron
- The Alfred Hitchcock Hour (1964) (Season 3 Episode 7: "The McGregor Affair") as Elsie Muldoon
- The Alfred Hitchcock Hour (1965) (Season 3 Episode 22: "Thou Still Unravished Bride") as Woman
