= William Beckley (actor) =

British American actor (1930–2015)

- William Beckley in Escape From the Planet of the Apes 1971
- Born: January 15, 1930; London, England
- Died: March 11, 2015 (aged 85)

William Beckley (January 15, 1930 – March 11, 2015) was a British-American actor, best known for his role as Gerard the butler in the television series Dynasty from 1981 to 1989, and the reunion miniseries Dynasty: The Reunion (1991).

Other TV credits include: Combat!, Batman, Mission: Impossible, Hogan's Heroes, Night Gallery, Marcus Welby, M.D., Voyage to the Bottom of the Sea, Planet of the Apes, Charlie's Angels, Kojak, Fantasy Island, Hawaii Five-O, General Hospital, Barnaby Jones (in 4 episodes) and The Rockford Files.

== Filmography ==
| Year | Title | Role | Notes |
|---|---|---|---|
| 1964 | My Fair Lady | Footman | Uncredited |
| 1965 | The Collector | Crutchley | Uncredited |
| 1967 | The President's Analyst | 2nd Puddlian | |
| 1968 | The Legend of Lylah Clare | Actor Playing Zarkan | Uncredited |
| 1968 | The Killing of Sister George | Floor Manager | |
| 1970 | Too Late the Hero | Pvt. Currie | |
| 1971 | Escape from the Planet of the Apes | British TV Reporter | Uncredited |
| 1972 | Everything You Always Wanted to Know About Sex | King's Herald | Uncredited |
| 1973 | The Picture Of Dorian Gray | Syme | |
| 1973 | Death Race | British Airman | ABC Movie of the Week |
| 1977 | Young Lady Chatterley | Philip - Fiancé | |
| 1978 | Sextette | Desk Clerk | |
| 1979 | Hard Knocks | Richard | |
