= Michael Culhane =

- Dynasty character
- Wayne Northrop as Michael Culhane
- Portrayed by: Wayne Northrop
- Duration: 1981, 1986–87
- First appearance: "Oil" (1981)
- Last appearance: "The Sublet" (1987)
- Created by: Richard and Esther Shapiro

Michael Culhane is a fictional character from the ABC television series Dynasty, created by Richard and Esther Shapiro. Portrayed by Wayne Northrop, the character is introduced in the series' 1981 pilot episode as the chauffeur of oil tycoon Blake Carrington (John Forsythe). Michael is also having an affair with Blake's self-indulgent daughter, Fallon (Pamela Sue Martin). Northrop left the series at the end of the first season, but returned for season seven, during which Michael dates Fallon's sister, Amanda (Karen Cellini). In The CW's 2017 reboot of the series, Michael is portrayed by Robert Christopher Riley.

== Original series ==
Northrop debuted as Michael in the Dynasty pilot episode, "Oil" (1981), and left in the season one finale, "The Testimony" (1981). He returned in the seventh season premiere "The Victory" (1986), and left again in the episode "The Sublet" (1987).

=== Storylines ===
==== Season one ====
As Dynasty begins, Carrington chauffeur Michael is involved in a sexual relationship with heiress Fallon, the daughter of his boss, Blake Carrington. Michael proves useful to Blake in his shady business dealings, but Blake has him beaten up when he learns of his relationship with Fallon.

==== Season two ====
Fired by Blake, Michael leaves town in the episode "The Verdict" without informing Fallon of his departure.

==== Season seven ====
Michael returns in the seventh season premiere "The Victory", in time to save Fallon's sister Amanda Carrington from a fire at La Mirage. The two become romantically involved as Blake gives Michael back his job as Blake's driver, but Blake fires Michael when he sees him kissing Amanda. An angry Michael, not really as poor as he has let on, secretly orchestrates a deal that would give him a piece of Blake's latest venture. However, Amanda's mother Alexis Colby reveals his schemes, and he leaves Denver again in "The Sublet".

== Reboot ==
Michael Culhane
- Dynasty character
- Robert Christopher Riley as Michael Culhane
- Portrayed by: Robert Christopher Riley
- Duration: 2017–22
- First appearance: "I Hardly Recognized You" (2017)
- Last appearance: "Catch 22" (2022)
- Created by: Sallie Patrick; Richard and Esther Shapiro
In-universe information
- Occupation: Businessman; Chauffeur (formerly)
- Father: James Culhane
- Mother: Luella Culhane
- Sisters: Evie Culhane
- Spouse: Nina Fournier (m. 2022)

=== Casting and development ===
A pilot for a Dynasty reboot for The CW was announced in September 2016, and Riley was cast as Michael in February 2017. The new series premiered on The CW on October 11, 2017.

The character is one of several cast as nonwhite for the reboot. Executive producer Sallie Patrick said that with Michael and Carrington butler Anders, "we introduce the theme of upstairs/downstairs, because how can you have a show about the filthy rich without including the people who try their damnedest to keep them clean?"

=== Storylines ===
==== Season one ====
Carrington chauffeur Michael Culhane (Robert Christopher Riley) is also Fallon's lover and unofficial henchman, though he has feelings for her which seem unrequited. Michael gets photos for Fallon of Cristal kissing her ex-lover Matthew Blaisdel in "I Hardly Recognized You". In "Guilt is for Insecure People", Michael is hesitant to help Fallon find leverage against her father Blake. Meanwhile, Fallon's brother Steven is suspicious of Blake's involvement in Matthew's death, and Michael reveals to him that Blake has Matthew's phone in his possession. Somewhat frustrated by Fallon's dismissive treatment, Michael becomes involved with Kori Rucks, Fallon's acquaintance from high school, in "Private as a Circus". Their relationship survives Fallon's jealous meddling in "I Exist Only for Me". In "A Taste of Your Own Medicine", Fallon meets Michael's parents, Louella and James. Michael has led them to believe that he is a vice president at Carrington Atlantic, and Fallon backs him up. In "The Best Things in Life", Michael's relationship with Kori implodes over his lingering feelings for Fallon. In "Rotten Things", Fallon has a falling out with Monica Colby, who begins her own romantic relationship with Michael. When Fallon discovers that Monica is helping Jeff manipulate her into marriage for nefarious reasons in "Nothing but Trouble", Michael agrees to help Fallon investigate why, and turn the tables on the Colbys. In "The Gospel According to Blake Carrington", Michael enlists the help of his computer genius teenage sister, Evie (Elizabeth Youman), who confirms Fallon's suspicions that Jeff has access to all Carrington emails and texts. On the eve of her faux wedding to Jeff in "Our Turn Now", Fallon tells Michael she loves him, and asks him to marry her at city hall. He refuses, not wanting something so important to be part of a Carrington plot. In "Enter Alexis", Michael learns that his father is seriously ill, and resigns. Cristal connects James's leukemia diagnosis to a Carrington Atlantic coverup in "Don't Con a Con Artist". Louella asks Fallon to keep her distance from Michael in "Use or Be Used". In "A Line from the Past", James dies as the coverup is exposed in the press, and Cristal—in her last act as COO after being fired by Blake—hires Michael. When Blake pushes back against Fallon's and Michael's efforts toward change in "Trashy Little Tramp", Michael urges Fallon to do the right thing. She finds incriminating information on Blake, which she uses in a secret meeting with the Carrington Atlantic board to make a case for them to name her CEO in Blake's place. Fallon professes her love for Michael in "Dead Scratch", but he announces his intention to leave Atlanta. When the Carringtons are trapped in the burning trophy room, Michael comes to their rescue.

==== Season two ====
In "Twenty-Three Skidoo", Michael and Fallon have resumed their relationship. Though Fallon and Liam Ridley are still pretending to be married, Michael proposes, and she accepts.
