= Liam Ridley =

Fictional character from Dynasty (2017)

- Dynasty character
- Adam Huber as Liam Ridley
- Portrayed by: Adam Huber
- Duration: 2018–22
- First appearance: "Our Turn Now" (2018, recurring cast); "Guilt Trip to Alaska" (2019, main cast)
- Last appearance: "Catch 22" (2022)
- Created by: Sallie Patrick; Libby Wells
In-universe information
- Other names: Jack Louden (birth name); John Southside
- Occupation: Novelist; Journalist
- Father: John Lowden
- Mother: Laura Van Kirk
- Stepfather: George
- Siblings: Connor; Unnamed sister
- Spouse: Fallon Carrington
- Children: Lauren Morell Carrington Ridley
- Uncles: Max Van Kirk
- Aunts: Mora Van Kirk; Lydia
- Other relatives: Marsha; Emily

Liam Ridley (real name Jack Liam Ridley Lowden) is a fictional character from The CW's 2017 series Dynasty, a reboot of the 1980s prime time soap opera of the same name. Portrayed by Adam Huber, Liam is the only series regular role in the remake not based on a character from the original series. Liam first appears in the 2018 episode "Our Turn Now", in which he meets and agrees to marry Atlanta energy heiress Fallon Carrington (Elizabeth Gillies) to thwart the plans of tech billionaire Jeff Colby (Sam Adegoke) to ruin her. After recurring in seasons one and two, Huber was promoted to a series regular for the third season. The character has been a fan favorite since his very first appearance.

== Characterization ==
Huber called Liam "just a good guy". He attributed his character's popularity to Liam's function as the straight man in contrast to the heightened melodrama of the Carringtons, adding that fans love Liam's chemistry with Fallon, portrayed by Gillies. He said that "Liam keeps Fallon accountable," and noted:

Liam is the voice of reason because he's taken a step away from his crazy family to try to be a normal person, and he's trying to teach Fallon that you don't have to do this crazy stuff, just be truthful to people, be a good person, Don't lie don't cheat don't steal. Though it's Dynasty, so that's always gonna happen.

Lizzy Buczak of TV Fanatic wrote that "the Van Kirks get worse with each family additional family member. I can see why Liam decided he was better off changing his name and becoming estranged." Liam explains to Fallon in "The Butler Did It" that he allows his mother Laura Van Kirk (Sharon Lawrence) to berate him because he is protective of her, Laura having suffered a mental breakdown after the death of Liam's father. Buczak was disappointed with Liam's "timid reaction" upon learning in "New Lady in Town" that Fallon's treacherous brother Adam Carrington (Sam Underwood) slept with his mother, and wrote "I was hoping to see Liam throw a few much-deserved punches". Huber said he wants Adam to pay for what he has done to Liam and Fallon, but noted "I don't know if Liam's the type of who's going to really go after him".

== Development ==
Buczak called Liam's relationship with Fallon "tumultuous yet epic". Andrea Reiher of Brit + Co noted that their business arrangement took on a hint of romance in "Don't Con a Con Artist". Huber explained:

I didn't really prepare for the character of Liam in any some sort of way. Because I don't think they really knew who Liam was going to be. I honestly don't think he was supposed to be in the story this long. The character just kind of happened episode by episode. And the fans seem to really like Fallon and Liam together.

Though the show had hinted that Liam could actually be Fallon's long-lost brother Adam, Delia Harrington of Den of Geek called the reveal of Liam's backstory as the disgruntled heir of another wealthy family "a bit of a letdown after all the hinting", and "all too straightforward." Georgia Makitalo of Hidden Remote called Liam's admission in "Dead Scratch" that he is in love with Fallon a "shocking revelation".

Paul Dailly of TV Fanatic called the love triangle of Fallon, Liam, and Michael Culhane (Robert Christopher Riley) "one of the most engrossing love triangles on TV in quite some time", adding that "both Liam and Culhane are genuinely nice men who care for Fallon [and] her dream about the three-way in the shower confirmed that Fallon was conflicted." Samantha Nguyen of MyFantasySportsTalk noted that though the love triangle seemed settled by Fallon and Michael's engagement in "Twenty-Three Skidoo", the series had "made it pretty clear that there's more drama to come". Asserting that Fallon and Michael's chemistry had dissipated in season two in favor of Liam, Buczak also pointed out, "Fallon is more conflicted than ever regarding her feelings for Liam and Culhane. Fallon still had lingering feelings for Liam. However, she probably would have been able to curb those emotions had she not assumed Culhane was having an affair."

Huber researched amnesia for his third season storyline. Though that plot development was a surprise, he noted, "It gives me something to play with." Saying that he wanted Liam and Fallon to ultimately be together, Huber acknowledged that "you have to have the drama because of the type of show it is. Without it, it's just kind of 'meh'." He said, "You can never be too happy or too sad for too long on this show...It's always going to be kind of a rocky road for [Fallon and Liam], though, and in this TV show it's never going to be rainbows and balloons, there are gonna be things that try to complicate their relationship." Huber said of Fallon and Liam, "They're cut from the same cloth. I think they truly understand and get each other, and make each other happy. But they really are soulmates, so I'm hoping that's what the writers think." He noted:

Fallon needs a person in her life that keeps her grounded and keeps her from doing crazy Carrington stuff. And Liam comes from a crazy family as well. They're very similar, and their families are very similar, and I think they need to stick together. They understand each other...I don't know what they would do with me without that relationship.

Huber added, "I want the relationship on the show to be a positive relationship. You know, the younger generation is watching it. I want them to support each other and be there for one another. Not like have this crazy drama and crazy fighting because not all relationships are like that." Of future storylines, he said that he hopes he will be able to do more physical action and stunts in future episodes, and that the show will have Liam reconnect with the child he gave up.

== Appearances ==
Huber first appeared in the 2018 episode "Our Turn Now", in which Liam meets and marries Atlanta energy heiress Fallon Carrington to thwart tech billionaire Jeff Colby's plot against her. He recurred on Dynasty for the first two seasons, never sure how long he would be kept around. It was announced in October 2019 that Huber had been promoted to a series regular for season three. He said that being put on contract with the show was unexpected, and that he was testing for a role on an upcoming NYPD Blue reboot when the offer was made during filming of season two. Huber said, "people really love our chemistry and me as a love interest on the show, so I think that's why it stuck." Liam is the only series regular role in the remake not based on a character from the original series, and the character is Huber's first series regular role.

== Storylines ==
=== Season one ===
In "Our Turn Now", Fallon (Elizabeth Gillies) sets up Liam as Sam's date to her faux wedding to Jeff (Sam Adegoke). Sam (Rafael de la Fuente) and Liam hit it off, making Fallon's brother Steven (James Mackay) jealous. Liam eventually admits that he is not gay, and encourages Sam to seek out Steven. Turning the tables on the Colbys, Fallon announces to Jeff that their new marriage is invalid since she met and married Liam the night before at city hall. Though their annulment is in the works, Liam agrees to attend Fallon's grandfather's funeral with her in "Poor Little Rich Girl". He is recognized by someone as "Jack", but dismisses it as a mistake to Fallon. After he helps her try to manipulate a confession out of her mother Alexis (Nicollette Sheridan) in "Don't Con a Con Artist", Liam and Fallon kiss. Fallon agrees to a date with him in "Use or Be Used", but misses it when she learns that her ex-boyfriend Michael's father is in the hospital. Alexis reveals to Fallon that Liam is really a journalist named Jack Lowden writing a tell-all, and Fallon cuts him loose. Liam gives Alexis his manuscript—actually about his own wealthy family—for delivery to Fallon, but Alexis burns it instead. Liam appears at Steven and Sam's wedding in "Dead Scratch", and tells Fallon he is in love with her. He reveals that his manuscript was about his own family, the Van Kirks of New York.

=== Season two ===
In "Twenty-Three Skidoo", Fallon is negotiating to sell Carrington Atlantic to Liam's uncle Max Van Kirk (C. Thomas Howell), but she and Liam have to pretend to still be married to secure the deal. Max coerces Fallon and Liam to kiss in front of him, which leaves Fallon slightly confused about her feelings. Liam introduces Fallon to his imperious mother, Laura (Sharon Lawrence), in "The Butler Did It", and Fallon faces off with her in Liam's defense. Suspecting Michael (Robert Christopher Riley) is cheating on her, Fallon almost has sex with Liam in "Queen of Cups". Liam gives Fallon an ultimatum about their relationship in "That Witch", and she ultimately chooses Michael over Liam. In "A Champagne Mood", Fallon and Michael go to Liam for his help in accessing Van Kirk files, which they hope will prove that Max was behind the drug smuggling and keep Michael out of jail. Although reluctant at first, Liam agrees to help. After Fallon breaks things off with Michael because she cannot trust him, she visits Liam, but another woman answers the door. In "The Sight of You", Fallon takes a girls trip with Monica (Wakeema Hollis), Cristal (Ana Brenda Contreras), and stowaway Kirby (Maddison Brown), but her true motive is to see Liam, who is at the same ski resort in Idaho with his new girlfriend Ashley (Taylor Black). While Sam and the women sabotage Ashley, Fallon asks Liam for another chance. He is happy with Ashley, and asks Fallon to move on as well. After Ashley and her friends brawl with Fallon and her posse at a dive bar, a furious Liam tells Fallon he never wants to see her again. In "Miserably Ungrateful Men", Fallon buys the publishing company that is releasing Liam's novel, intending to scrap the book but trying to manipulate him into pulling out of the deal on his own. In "How Two-Faced Can You Get", Fallon reads and loves Liam's novel, which is about their relationship. She goes to him to apologize, and offers to publish it after all. In "Life is a Masquerade Party", Fallon arranges for Liam and his ex, Ashley, to spend time together in public to promote his book, but is jealous when they appear to be rekindling their relationship. Fallon and Liam admit they are in love with each other. Fallon's brother Adam (Sam Underwood) takes a photo of Fallon and Liam kissing, which he sells to the press. The negative publicity surrounding the photo threatens Liam's book sales in "This Illness of Mine", forcing Fallon to confirm publicly that the book is about her and not Ashley. Liam's mother Laura appears and threatens to block the novel's publication unless Fallon breaks things off with Liam. He tries to broker a peace over dinner. Laura claims to be dying of cancer, but Fallon is suspicious. Fallon has Laura's blood tested and proves she is lying, but Laura deflects the accusation and Liam is angry with Fallon. Laura is eventually forced to confess, and Liam softens to Fallon. In "New Lady in Town", Fallon and Liam plot to expose Adam's true colors to her father Blake (Grant Show), but Adam outmaneuvers them each time. While Fallon steps in for Blake to prevent Jeff and Michael from seizing control of the Atlantix in "Thicker Than Money", Liam and Kirby help her snatch a book deal from a competitor. Liam and Fallon finally have sex. Liam, hit over the head by Adam, falls face down into the pool in "Deception, Jealousy, and Lies".

=== Season three ===
In "Guilt Trip to Alaska", Liam has been rescued but lies in a coma. Adam tries to kill Liam in the hospital, but is interrupted by Fallon. Ashley arrives, and when Liam wakes up, he does not remember Fallon. She pulls out all the stops to get Liam to remember her in "Caution Never Won a War", but his mother Laura does her best to thwart Fallon's efforts, including filing a restraining order against Fallon. Learning that Liam is marrying Ashley, Fallon attempts to restore Liam's memory in "Something Desperate" by having him read his original manuscript that details their relationship. He reads it and does not marry Ashley, but tells Fallon he still does not remember her, and wants to be on his own. Just as Fallon moves on from Liam with Evan (Ken Kirby) in "Mother? I'm at La Mirage", Liam begins to remember their past together. He asks her to dinner, hoping to recover more memories, in "A Used Up Memory". Not wanting Liam to remember what Adam did to him, Adam arranges for Evan to see Fallon with Liam. A possessive Evan warns Liam to keep away from Fallon. Liam's memories return, and he and Fallon reunite. In "Shoot from the Hip", Fallon is worried that Liam will forget her again, and he is angry to discover she lied to him to keep him close. Fallon gives Liam free rein in writing an article about Blake's murder trial for her magazine in "The Sensational Blake Carrington Trial", but when he includes her own less-than-flattering courtroom performance, she trashes her own office and erases the article. Fallon realizes that Adam's sight has returned, and Liam remembers that it was Adam who hit him over the head. In the vineyard's barn, they struggle at the edge of the loft door. In "The Caviar, I Trust, Is Not Burned", Adam saves Liam from falling but then falls himself. Liam and Fallon fight and then reconcile when Fallon begins making life decisions without consulting him in "Battle Lines".

== Reception ==
Buczak noted that Liam has been a fan favorite since his very first appearance. Virginia Mendes of Ecos said that though Liam is a character original to the new series, he has "made such a huge impact in the present audience".
