= Sammy Jo Carrington =

- Dynasty character
- Heather Locklear as Sammy Jo Carrington
- Portrayed by: Heather Locklear
- Duration: 1981–1989, 1991
- First appearance: "Reconciliation" (1981)
- Last appearance: "Catch 22" (1989)
- Created by: Richard and Esther Shapiro
- Spin-off appearances: Dynasty: The Reunion (1991)
In-universe information
- Occupation: Model; Owner of Delta Rho Stables
- Parents: Iris Dean; Daniel Reece
- Stepfather: Frank Dean
- Spouse: Steven Carrington; Clay Fallmont
- Children: Danny Carrington
- Aunts and uncles: Krystle Carrington
- Nieces and nephews: L.B. Colby; Lauren Colby
- First cousins: Krystina Carrington

Samantha Josephine "Sammy Jo" Carrington (maiden name Dean) is a fictional character on the ABC television series Dynasty, created by Richard and Esther Shapiro. The niece of central protagonist Krystle Carrington (Linda Evans), Sammy Jo marries and has a son with Steven Carrington (Al Corley, later Jack Coleman).

Originated by actress Heather Locklear during the series' second season in 1981, Sammy Jo was a recurring character until the end of the fifth season in 1985, after which Locklear was promoted to a permanent cast member. The character remained on the series until its finale in 1989, with Locklear reprising her role for the 1991 miniseries Dynasty: The Reunion.

In The CW's 2017 reboot of the series, actor Rafael de la Fuente portrays a gay male version of the character, named Sam "Sammy Jo" Jones.

== Original series ==
Heather Locklear first appeared as Sammy Jo in the 1981 season two episode "Reconciliation". The character recurred until the end of season five, after which Locklear was promoted to a permanent cast member. Sammy Jo remained on the series until its finale in 1989, with Locklear reprising her role for the 1991 miniseries Dynasty: The Reunion.

=== Storylines ===
==== Season two ====
After traveling the amateur race car circuit with her stepfather, Frank Dean, young Sammy Jo Dean is sent to Denver to stay with her aunt, Krystle, who has recently married millionaire Blake Carrington. Sammy Jo becomes romantically involved with Blake's son, Steven, who has been struggling with his sexuality. Neither Blake nor his ex-wife, Alexis, particularly care for Sammy Jo, who is a bit common for their tastes. Sammy Jo and Steven elope, much to the disapproval of the rest of the family. It soon becomes clear that Sammy Jo has married Steven for his money, as she starts buying expensive clothes and charging them to Blake. Sammy Jo overhears Steven talking with Alexis about the secret possibility that Blake is not Fallon's biological father. Later, while drunk and arguing with Fallon at a party, Sammy Jo confronts Fallon with this revelation. A pregnant Fallon drives off upset and crashes her car, resulting in an emergency C-section. When Alexis learns that it was Sammy Jo who told Fallon that Blake was not her father, she offers Sammy Jo a check for $20,000 to sign a declaration stating that she and Steven never consummated their marriage so that it can be annulled. Sammy Jo refuses to sign, and instead blackmails Alexis by threatening to show Steven the declaration. Sammy Jo takes the $20,000 and leaves Denver. Steven follows her to Hollywood, but she rejects him, telling him that he cannot give her the material things that she wants.

==== Season three ====
While Steven is missing and presumed dead in an oil rig explosion, Sammy Jo returns to Denver with a baby, Danny, who she claims was fathered by Steven. Sammy Jo leaves the baby with Blake and Krystle, and moves to New York to pursue a modeling career. When Steven turns up alive, he goes to New York and suggests that they marry. Sammy Jo refuses.

==== Season four ====
Steven's new wife Claudia starts receiving gifts and phone calls seemingly from her presumed dead ex-husband, Matthew Blaisdel. Steven and Claudia eventually track the ruse to Morgan Hess, a private investigator with ties to Alexis. However, it is Sammy Jo who has employed Hess, and she returns to Denver to fight for custody of Danny.

==== Season five ====
Sammy Jo tricks Steven's brother, Adam, to take her to the airport, allowing her to kidnap Danny. She demands $30,000 a month for his return. Blake comes up with a plan that involved Adam getting Danny back. Adam does, and Sammy Jo returns to New York, defeated. Later, Krystle comes to visit Sammy Jo with Daniel Reece, who she says is Sammy Jo's biological father. Daniel dies soon afterward, leaving his wealth to Sammy Jo. However, Krystle is executor and refuses to disburse the inheritance until Sammy Jo "straightens up". Furious, Sammy Jo returns to New York, vowing revenge. When her actress friend Rita Lesley practices a new role in a blond wig, Sammy Jo realizes she is a lookalike for Krystle.

==== Season six ====
Sammy Jo plans to use Rita to impersonate Krystle and trick the bank into releasing her inheritance. Soon Rita's lover, Joel Abrigore, takes over the scheme, intending for Rita to embezzle as much of Blake's money as possible. Joel kidnaps Krystle, and Rita takes her place in the Carrington mansion. Sammy Jo becomes uncomfortable with the plan when she suspects that Joel and Rita are poisoning Blake. In "The Alarm" (1986), a frightened Sammy Jo confesses to Steven. He saves his father from Rita while Sammy Jo frees Krystle from captivity. Blake and Krystle agree not to press charges in return for Sammy Jo's cooperation with the police search for Joel and Rita. Sammy Jo becomes romantically involved with Clay Fallmont. When she catches him kissing his ex-girlfriend Amanda Carrington—Steven's younger sister—at the La Mirage hotel, the women get into a fight and fall into the pool while the hotel is consumed by fire.

==== Season seven ====
Sammy Jo tells Clay she is pregnant in "The Choice", and they marry in "The Letter". She finds out she is not pregnant but is afraid to tell Clay; she eventually does, and they dissolve the marriage in "The Birthday". With Danny acting out in school over his parents' custody conflicts, in "The Test" Sammy Jo and Steven decide to live together platonically in an attempt to give Danny a normal home life. They fall into bed together in "The Dress", but Steven realizes it was mistake in "Valez", and moves out.

==== Season eight ====
Steven is annoyed when Sammy Jo becomes romantically involved with Josh Harris, the quarterback on the football team Steven owns. Josh quits the team over his cocaine addiction, and proposes to Sammy Jo. When she refuses, he overdoses and dies. Sammy Jo begins dating Jeff Colby, and he proposes as well. She accepts, not knowing that he has been sleeping with his ex-wife, Steven's sister Fallon.

==== Season nine ====
Sammy Jo confronts Fallon over Jeff, and the women have a muddy catfight. It ends in laughter when they realize that neither one of them wants Jeff. They become friends. Sammy Jo becomes romantically involved with Tanner McBride, only to learn that he is a Catholic priest.

==== The Reunion (1991) ====
By the 1991 Dynasty: The Reunion miniseries, Sammy Jo has returned to her modeling career in New York. She is sleeping with her married boss, which ultimately gets her fired. Sammy Jo returns to Denver and is welcomed back into the Carrington family.

== Reboot ==
Samuel Josiah Jones
- Dynasty character
- Rafael de la Fuente as Sam Jones
- Portrayed by: Rafael de la Fuente
- Duration: 2017–2022
- First appearance: "I Hardly Recognized You" (2017)
- Last appearance: "Catch 22" (2022)
- Created by: Sallie Patrick; Richard and Esther Shapiro
In-universe information
- Occupation: Owner of La Mirage; Influencer
- Father: Daniel Ruiz
- Mother: Iris Machado
- Stepparents: Alejandro Raya
- Husband: Steven Carrington (2018–2019)
- Aunts and uncles: Celia Machado a.k.a. Cristal Flores

A pilot for a Dynasty reboot for The CW was announced in September 2016, and Rafael de la Fuente was cast as Samuel Josiah Jones, a gay male version of Sammy Jo, in March 2017. The new series premiered on The CW on October 11, 2017.

=== Characterization ===
The nephew of Cristal Flores (Nathalie Kelley), a Latino version of the original series' Krystle, Sam is a "cute schemer" who is romantically connected to Steven Carrington (James Mackay). Executive producer Stephanie Savage said, "With Steven Carrington out and proud, it makes sense for Sammy Jo to be a man." Executive Producer Sallie Patrick said that Sam has "every bit of the pot-stirring troublemaker vibe that Heather Locklear had on the original." De la Fuente said of the character, "His heart is in the right place, but he's had a rough upbringing and he's had to figure out how to survive. Sometimes he's a little bit naughty, a little bit of a schemer, but he's not a bad guy. He's not trying to harm anyone." According to de la Fuente, "He's not really a villain, but he does naughty stuff. I think audiences are going to like him because he has a way about doing the things he does that is just very funny and charming. He uses his natural sexuality and charm to get away with murder, and it's fun to watch because he's a little bit outrageous sometimes. A lot outrageous." Sam is also devoted to his aunt Cristal, with whom he shares a mysterious past in Venezuela.

Patrick said of Sam, "It felt right to make him [Steven's] soulmate." De la Fuente noted, however, that Sam's relationship with Steven will be a "rollercoaster" that will "take quick, sharp turns". He said of the attraction between the characters:

Steven's buttoned up-ness and just like how much of a good boy he is, I think, amuses Sam, and Sam thinks it's funny and finds it really entertaining to try to push him out of his box and mess with him. And I think Steven is incredibly interested by how in the moment, sometimes even reckless, Sam is because he's so square and such a good boy. So it's a fun, interesting dynamic because they're polar opposites.

Patrick said of Sam and majordomo Anders, "We've introduced their friendship, and I totally 'ship them together. Locking them in the basement was so much fun ... Sammy Jo is always getting in over his head, so it made sense for him to be the first one knocked out. And the funniest person to lock him in the basement with seemed to be Anders."

An intoxicated Sam marries a stripper named Scorpio during Fallon's bachelorette party in "My Hangover's Arrived". Showrunner Josh Reims explained, "We went into the episode with Sam thinking, 'I'm never going to have another relationship again.' So even though he got married under the influence, it showed that—deep down—he does want a relationship, whether he knows it or not." The episode was later confirmed to be the season finale, since production of Dynasty was suspended in March 2020 as a direct result of the COVID-19 pandemic. Filming of only 20 of the 22 ordered episodes of the third season had been completed at that time, and Reims said he hoped to be able to use reworked versions of the remaining two episodes to start season four. He explained, "We were going to bring back Ryan (aka 'Scorpio') for Episodes 21 and 22, and we were going to explore the idea of Sam trying to have a relationship with this guy. It was going to be an interesting triangle if we were to bring back Fletcher, Sam's married ex-boyfriend."

=== Storylines ===
==== Season one ====
In the premiere episode "I Hardly Recognized You", Sam has a one-night stand with Steven, and helps himself to some of the cash in Steven's pocket. Later, they meet again as both men realize that Sam's aunt Cristal is Steven's new stepmother. Steven tries to uncomplicate matters by keeping his distance from Sam, who is staying at the mansion, but is won over by Sam's compulsive honesty and thoughtfulness. Meanwhile, Sam's mother Iris is in trouble and needs money, but Cristal is unable to send any without Blake finding out. To secure the money, Sam arranges for a friend to steal Cristal's engagement ring and other valuables during a charity gala in "Guilt is for Insecure People". An incriminating phone that had been in Blake's possession is stolen as well, and Sam goes to Steven for help retrieving it in "Private as a Circus". Sam gets mad when Steven involves the police without telling him, but just as they are about to reconcile, a repentant Sam admits his complicity in the robbery to a furious Steven. In "Company Slut", Carrington majordomo Anders manipulates Sam into the path of Steven's ex-boyfriend Ted Dinard. Steven is thrown to find that Ted and Sam have slept together, and a remorseful Sam explains to Steven that he has struggled so much to survive that he has trouble turning down opportunities. In "The Best Things in Life", Cristal remembers how Sam's abusive father Alejandro caused her miscarriage when she tried to protect Iris from him. Iris comes to Atlanta for the holidays in "Rotten Things", and Sam is shocked by the revelation that Cristal killed his father Alejandro while defending Iris in Venezuela. In "A Well-Dressed Tarantula", Sam is icy to Cristal for letting him believe that his father abandoned the family. Alive and scheming with Iris, Alejandro reveals himself to an emotional Sam, who has no idea that his parents are extorting Cristal to push through their shady deal with Carrington Atlantic. Sam helps Cristal and the Carringtons turn the tables on Alejandro and Iris by taking his father's phone and impersonating him to his minions.

Sam and Steven move out of the mansion to live together as platonic friends, and Fallon hires Sam as her assistant. In "Nothing but Trouble", a distraught Ted shows up at their apartment and, using drugs and believing that Steven and Sam are romantically involved, stages a scuffle with Sam and leaps out of an upper story window. Sam admits to Steven that he is in the country illegally in "The Gospel According to Blake Carrington", so Steven lies his way to Ted's hospital bedside to retrieve an earring that links Sam to the accident. Anders sets Sam up with an immigration lawyer to begin the citizenship process. In "Our Turn Now", Sam is hurt when Steven puts a stop to rekindling their romance, and has Fallon set him up with a date for her wedding. Steven is jealous watching Sam get to know his date, Liam Ridley, but eventually Steven and Sam decide to get back together. With Sam facing deportation, Steven sleeps with Senator Daniels' wife Melissa, with whom he had an affair 10 years before, to help him secure an O-1 visa for Sam in "Poor Little Rich Girl". Steven proposes marriage to Sam while eulogizing his grandfather, Thomas. Believing Sam to be a poor match for her son, Steven's newly returned mother, Alexis Carrington, tries to frame Sam for shoplifting in "Don't Con a Con Artist". Fallon thwarts the plan, and Sam assists her in a plot to expose Alexis' machinations to Steven. Steven and Sam marry in "Dead Scratch", but the Carringtons are subsequently trapped in a fire. Sam escapes, but Steven is nowhere to be found.

==== Season two ====
In the season two premiere "Twenty-Three Skidoo", Sam is mourning Cristal, who died in the fire. Several women appear claiming to be the person from whom Cristal—whose real name is Celia Machado—stole her assumed identity. Sam is aware of enough details to know that they are all lying. Steven has not yet told Sam about Melissa's pregnancy, which is starting to show. Blake exposes the truth about Melissa to Sam, who comes to accept the news of the baby as a positive thing in his life.
