= Dynasty season 1 =

Dynasty season 1 may refer to:

- Dynasty (1981 TV series) season 1
- Dynasty (2017 TV series) season 1
