= Claudia Blaisdel Carrington =

- Dynasty character
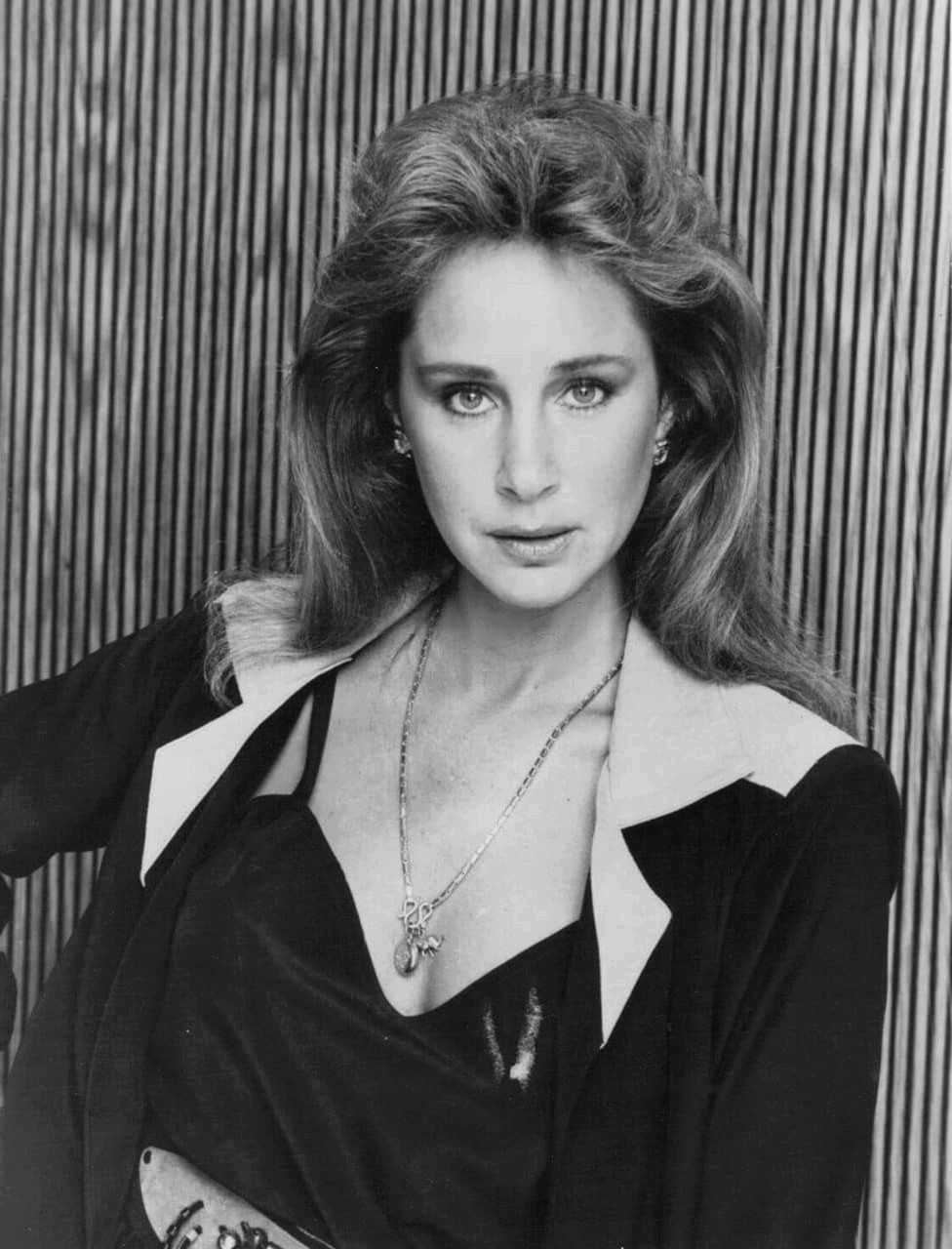
- Pamela Bellwood as Claudia Carrington (1983)
- Portrayed by: Pamela Bellwood
- Duration: 1981–1986
- First appearance: "Oil" (1981)
- Last appearance: "The Choice (a.k.a.) The Vendetta" (1986)
- Created by: Richard and Esther Shapiro
In-universe information
- Other names: Birth name: Claudia Mary Johnson (or Barrows)
- Occupation: Diner waitress; Denver-Carrington secretary; Hotel manager at La Mirage; Socialite
- Spouse: Matthew Blaisdel; Steven Carrington; Adam Carrington
- Children: Lindsay Blaisdel
- Stepchildren: Danny Carrington
- Nieces and nephews: L.B. Colby; Lauren Colby

Claudia Blaisdel Carrington is a fictional character from the ABC prime time soap opera Dynasty, created by Richard and Esther Shapiro. Originated by Pamela Bellwood in the series' 1981 pilot episode, "Oil", Claudia is initially the estranged, emotionally troubled wife of Denver–Carrington geologist Matthew Blaisdel (Bo Hopkins). She later becomes entangled in the intrigues surrounding the Carrington family, and is married for a time to Steven Carrington (Jack Coleman), and later his brother Adam (Gordon Thomson). Bellwood left Dynasty at the end of the sixth season in 1986.

Brianna Brown portrayed Claudia in The CW reboot Dynasty from 2017 to 2022.

== Original series ==
=== Appearances ===
Pamela Bellwood began playing Claudia Blaisdel in the Dynasty premiere episode, "Oil", on January 12, 1981. The character was written out after the October 20, 1982, third season episode "The Wedding", but Claudia reappeared in the March 30, 1983, episode "The Dinner" later that season. Bellwood rejoined the series as a regular cast member in the October 19, 1983, fourth season episode "The Note" and remained until the end of the sixth season.

Rather than incorporate Bellwood's pregnancy during the 1985–86 season into the character's storyline, her appearances were filmed in such a way as to conceal her condition. Later, her character was absent from several episodes in the middle of the season while she delivered her baby. (Note: Pamela Bellwood's son, Kerry Wheeler, was born on December 6, 1985.) At the end of the season, however, producers ultimately decided to kill Claudia off. Claudia's final episode was the sixth season finale "The Choice (a.k.a.) The Vendetta" on May 21, 1986.

=== Storylines ===
==== Season 1 ====
As Dynasty begins in 1981, Matthew Blaisdel returns to Denver from a long-term assignment in the Middle East to discover that his wife Claudia has been released from the sanitarium where she had been living since her breakdown in 1979. Matthew and daughter Lindsay find Claudia trying to restart her life, living on her own and working in a diner. Though struggling with his feelings for Krystle Jennings — whom he had fallen in love with while Claudia had been institutionalized but who is now engaged to Matthew's boss Blake Carrington — Matthew invites Claudia home to rebuild their marriage. Fragile Claudia is desperately trying to reconnect with Lindsay, who had been hurt and traumatized by Claudia's breakdown. Already tenuous, Matthew and Claudia's relationship is further strained as she realizes that he still has feelings for Krystle. Claudia is drawn to Blake's sensitive son Steven Carrington, who is struggling with his sexuality. Lindsay is devastated as she overhears Claudia accusing Matthew of only marrying her because she was pregnant. Matthew leaves Blake's employ to run his own rig, and soon their rivalry over Krystle transforms into a fierce rivalry over oil. Meanwhile, Claudia's friendship with Steven turns into an affair. Later, Claudia is called as a defense witness for Blake in his trial for the murder of Steven's former lover, Ted Dinard. Blake's lawyer argues that Steven's relationship with Claudia "proves" that Ted was a harmful influence on his son. Her secret out, Claudia knows her marriage is over and attempts to run away with Lindsay, only to crash her car in the first season finale, "The Testimony."

==== Season 2 ====
When Claudia wakes in the hospital in the season two premiere "Enter Alexis," she learns that Matthew has taken Lindsay and left the country. She tries to kill herself with sleeping pills but is rescued by Dr. Nick Toscanni, a friend of Blake's. Feeling responsible for her troubles, Blake had sent Nick to check on her; Claudia soon accepts Blake's offer to convalesce at the mansion, and begins therapy with Nick. Steven asks Claudia to marry him, but she declines, admitting that she is still in love with Matthew. As 1982 begins, Claudia is well enough to leave the Carrington mansion, moving into her own apartment and taking a job working for Blake's company, Denver-Carrington. In "The Iago Syndrome," Cecil Colby offers to help Claudia find Lindsay if she agrees to spy on Blake, and she reluctantly agrees. When he asks for information that she is unable to access, Cecil suggests that she sleep with his nephew Jeff Colby and make a copy of his key. Claudia does so in "The Baby," but is overcome with guilt; Jeff learns of her duplicity but blames Cecil. In "The Gun," Claudia intercepts a Telex relating that Matthew's crashed jeep had been found in South America with "no signs of life." Realizing that Cecil had already known that Matthew and Lindsay are dead, she plans to kill Cecil. Claudia is interrupted by Krystle, who attempts to take the gun away from her, and in the struggle Claudia is shot. With Claudia in surgery, the police doubt Krystle's version of the shooting; Claudia survives but her memory is spotty. She begins to obsess about Krystle's affair with Matthew. Somewhat hostile towards Krystle, Claudia begins to unravel in "The Two Princes" and begins packing for Ecuador, but Blake finally receives word that Matthew and Lindsay's bodies have been found. As the truth sinks in, Claudia remembers reading the first Telex, and the truth about Krystle's innocence in the shooting. Later, however, she hears the infant son of Jeff Colby and Blake's daughter Fallon crying; picking up the child, she calls him "Lindsay." The baby is kidnapped in the second season finale "The Cliff," and no one seems to notice that Claudia is not quite herself when she reports seeing a "foreign-looking man with a dark beard" on the grounds around the time the baby had disappeared.

==== Season 3 ====
Claudia herself disappears from the mansion in the third season episode "The Roof," and becomes the prime suspect in the kidnapping. She rents an apartment, cradling a baby she calls "Lindsay," but the landlady soon recognizes her from television reports and the police arrive. Cornered on the roof, a confused and unstable Claudia refuses the pleas of the Carringtons to give back the baby she thinks is her daughter. Startled by an officer, Claudia trips, and the baby plunges over the side of the building—but it is only a doll. In the October 20, 1982, episode "The Wedding," Jeff and Fallon's son is recovered from the real kidnapper, and Claudia returns to the sanitarium. Steven later visits her in the March 30, 1983 third season episode "The Dinner."

==== Season 4 ====
A recovered Claudia is released in the October 19, 1983 fourth season episode "The Note," and she and Steven make love. Steven is battling his father Blake over custody of Danny, Steven's son with his ex-wife Sammy Jo; Claudia devises a plan to secure Steven's victory. She and Steven marry in "Tender Comrades," and they are promptly awarded custody of Danny. Claudia begins receiving flowers and gifts that appear to be from Matthew. She and Steven visit the crash site in South America and view the wreckage of Matthew and Lindsay's car to convince Claudia that they are truly dead. However, upon returning home, Claudia receives a phone call from Matthew. As the calls continue, Krystle realizes that they are merely tape recordings. Claudia recalls that Matthew sent her tapes while she was hospitalized; she learns that Matthew's mother sold the tapes to an unknown man. Blake later figures out that the buyer was Morgan Hess, a private investigator with ties to his ex-wife (and Steven's mother) Alexis Colby. Hess, however, is working for Sammy Jo, who has decided to fight for custody of Danny.

==== Season 5 ====
Claudia and Steven's marriage is strained when she suspects that Steven is having an affair with a male co-worker, Luke Fuller. While Steven struggles with his attraction to Luke, Claudia is drawn into a brief affair with Dean Caldwell. Claudia confesses the affair and they separate; Claudia attempts to reconcile with Steven, but continues to catch him and Luke together. Claudia turns to Adam for support, and they also have an affair. Claudia divorces Steven and starts a relationship with Adam. Blake blames Claudia's leaving for "turning Steven gay" again and orders Adam to end the relationship. Adam agrees, but secretly tells Claudia that nothing will break them up. Amanda Carrington invites Claudia to her wedding to Prince Michael of Moldavia, which she attends despite the conflicts with Blake and Steven. When terrorists attack the wedding in a spray of gunfire, Luke shields Claudia and pushes her to the ground.

==== Season 6 ====
Claudia survives the terrorist attack (although Luke does not) and returns to Denver, where she and Adam are married. Ironically, Luke's death helps to repair her damaged relationship with Steven and they become friends. In "The Proposal," Claudia is informed of the death of Matthew's former business partner, Walter Lankershim, and inherits his oil well Lankershim-Blaisdel 1 (from the first season). Unfortunately, Blake had absorbed the well into Denver-Carrington years before, and flatly refuses to release it to her. Dreaming of financial independence, a furious Claudia blackmails Adam into using his ill-gotten power of attorney over Blake’s affairs to turn the well over to her. When the well turns out to be dry and worthless, Claudia snaps. In the May 21, 1986, sixth season finale "The Choice (a.k.a.) The Vendetta," Claudia reveals Adam's duplicity to Blake and moves into La Mirage. While obsessing about the Carringtons who have lied to and betrayed her, she accidentally sets her room on fire. The blaze consumes the entire hotel, putting several Carrington lives in danger. (Note: "The Choice" features Pamela Bellwood's final appearance as Claudia.)

==== Season 7 ====
A devastated Adam reports to Blake in the seventh season premiere "The Victory" that Claudia is dead; a body burned beyond recognition had been discovered in the aftermath of the fire, wearing Claudia's wedding ring. Others have also died, and Blake is soon arrested and accused of arson. In "The Arraignment," Blake's niece Jackie Deveraux, injured in the fire, remembers seeing Claudia with flames behind her, proving that the blaze started in Claudia's room. The charges against Blake are dropped.

== Reboot ==
Claudia Blaisdel
- Dynasty character
- Brianna Brown as Claudia in the 2017 reboot series
- Portrayed by: Brianna Brown
- Duration: 2017–2018, 2022
- First appearance: "I Hardly Recognized You"; October 11, 2017
- Last appearance: "Vicious Vendetta"; June 3, 2022
- Created by: Richard and Esther Shapiro; Sallie Patrick
In-universe information
- Occupation: Engineer
- Spouse: Matthew Blaisdel
- Children: Matthew Blaisdel, Jr.

A pilot for a Dynasty reboot for The CW was announced in September 2016, and Brianna Brown was cast as Claudia in March 2017. The show received a series order in May 2017, with Brown scheduled to recur in the role. The new series premiered on October 11, 2017.

=== Characterization ===
Executive producer Sallie Patrick said of reimagining the series:

One big decision we had to make when rebooting Dynasty was what to do with Matthew Blaisdel ... Matthew was Cristal's on-again-off-again lover, and while we loved that part of Cristal's backstory and loved Matthew's crazy wife, Claudia, he didn't bring that much to the original series other than business stories, and the Shapiros encouraged us to focus more on family than business. So, when I was watching the original Dynasty pilot, there's this oil rigging accident Blake sets up in order to tank the price so he can swoop in and buy it out from under his competitor. The realization of this causes Walter Lankershim (Willy in our version) to crash the Carrington wedding with a gun. In our version, it made dramatic (and soapy) sense to have Matthew injured in the accident, sending his wife, Claudia, to the Carringtons' doorstep to give Cristal the news that her new husband may have killed her ex-lover. And that accusation—and the mystery surrounding it—is what launches us into series.

The mystery is resolved by the seventh episode, "A Taste of Your Own Medicine", and Claudia is sent to a sanitarium. Delia Harrington of Den of Geek called the story "the cleanest way to wrap up Matthew's murder, but also like a bit of a misuse of someone who could have caused more thorny problems for the Carringtons." She noted, "Because this is a soap, Claudia is actually evil, rather than a good person the Carringtons screwed over. Purely good characters never last long on soaps, but making Claudia the killer absolves the Carringtons of everything and sends Claudia packing—at least for a little while." Harrington added, "I'm sure we haven't seen the last of Claudia—a sanitarium feels like the perfect place to store a character until a season finale". Patrick said:

She's gone off the canvas for a little while, but a character in an institution with a baby is certainly coming back. Claudia one of my favorite characters from the original show, so it just made sense to arc the story out this way. We have a few more big characters we're introducing, including Alexis, so we'll see Claudia again when she comes back to stir the pot after Alexis is settled in.

Claudia returns for the last two episodes of the first season, and recurs in season two. She returns for a cameo in the one hundredth episode in the fifth season.

=== Storylines ===
==== Season one ====
In the premiere episode "I Hardly Recognized You", Claudia is married to Matthew Blaisdel and recovering from a car accident, in which she suffered a head injury that has left her with memory loss. Matthew's affair with Cristal Flores is in the past, but Cristal's engagement to Blake Carrington prompts Matthew to resign from Denver Atlantic. On his final job for Blake, Matthew is injured in an explosion, and later dies. Distraught over Matthew's death, Claudia accuses Blake of murdering him. In "Spit It Out", the explosion is determined to have been caused by sabotage. Matthew's friend Willy Santiago confides in Cristal that before his death, Matthew refused Blake's offer of a job transfer to China. Blake and Cristal visit Claudia, writing her a large check to ease her worries and offering to pay for the funeral. In "Private as a Circus", Claudia sees a sex tape of Cristal and Matthew which has been leaked online, and the Carringtons are cleared of wrongdoing in Matthew's death by Willy's suicide note.

After Claudia confronts her in public in "Company Slut", Cristal apologizes to an irate Claudia, who chases Cristal into the street and is accidentally hit by Blake with his car. Claudia is pregnant, and Cristal insists that she stay at the mansion to convalesce in "I Exist Only for Me". Claudia bonds with Cristal's nephew Sam Jones, who encourages her to take advantage of the luxuries available at the mansion. Claudia's erratic behavior convinces Blake and Cristal that she should leave, but Sam and Cristal learn that Claudia has been taking the wrong medication. In "A Taste of Your Own Medicine", it is revealed that Claudia has been faking her memory problems. She had gotten into a car accident after Matthew told her he was leaving her for Cristal, but pretended to have prolonged symptoms. Holding the Carringtons at gunpoint, she admits to causing the explosion that killed Matthew, though his death was not her intent. Claudia wants Cristal to watch her kill Blake, but the rest of the family is able to overpower her. With Police Chief Aaron Stansfield's help, Blake sends Claudia to a sanitarium rather than prison.

Blake's daughter Fallon visits Claudia looking for incriminating information on her father in "Trashy Little Tramp", and promises to get Claudia released in exchange for the records Matthew kept. Claudia is later visited by Matthew, who is alive and vengeful toward the Carringtons. In "Dead Scratch", Matthew helps Claudia escape the sanitarium, and they infiltrate the mansion. Claudia snaps and confronts Cristal with a gun. Matthew steps between them as Claudia fires, except that Matthew is a figment of her imagination, and Cristal takes the bullet. Claudia flees with Hank Sullivan, Alexis Carrington's lover who has been pretending to be Blake and Alexis' long-lost firstborn, Adam Carrington.

==== Season two ====
Claudia reappears in "Queen of Cups", having given birth to a son she has named Matthew. She berates Hank for his failure to extort money from the Carringtons, and vows to do it "her way". In "That Witch", Hank cuts Claudia out of his payoff from Alexis. Realizing that Claudia is unhinged, he takes baby Matthew and leaves him on Alexis's doorstep. In "A Temporary Infestation", Alexis leaves Matthew to be found by Sam, who names him Little Blake. Sam sees a pregnant Claudia in his wedding photos to Steven Carrington in "A Real Instinct for the Jugular", and Alexis makes the connection that she is Little Blake's mother. Sam learns that Claudia has escaped the institution, and wonders if she killed his aunt Cristal and set the fire. Claudia rages over her missing child, and Little Blake disappears from the nursery. In "Crazy Lady", Claudia hides out in a hotel with baby Matthew, but a televised plea by Blake and Alexis leads the authorities to her. A hysterical Claudia has the baby on the roof, and Blake, Fallon, Sam, and Cristal Jennings try to coax her away from the edge. Claudia admits to killing Blake's late wife Cristal, and then trips and accidentally tosses the baby off the building. It is only a doll, and Kirby Anders discovers that Manuel the nanny actually kidnapped the baby. After Little Blake/Matthew is recovered, Claudia is arrested for murder, and Sam decides that the baby should be raised by his grandparents, the Blaisdels.

==== Season five ====
When an old enemy appears to be targeting Blake, Sam visits Claudia in "Vicious Vendetta". On parole and working with inmates as a corrections counselor, she denies any involvement, but when Sam leaves she calls someone to report that all the Carringtons will be in the same place for Alexis's wedding to Dex Dexter. Blake, Cristal and Sam are rattled when Claudia appears at the event, but she only has good wishes and an innocuous gift for Alexis.

== See also ==
- Carrington family tree
