= Enter Alexis =

"Enter Alexis" may refer to:

- "Enter Alexis" (Dynasty 1981), an episode of the 1981 prime time soap opera Dynasty
- "Enter Alexis" (Dynasty 2017), an episode of the 2017 reboot series Dynasty
