= Amanda Carrington =

- Dynasty character
- Catherine Oxenberg as Amanda Carrington
- Portrayed by: Catherine Oxenberg (1984–1986); Karen Cellini (1986–1987); Eliza Bennett (2021–2022)
- Duration: 1984–1987, 2021–2022
- First appearance: Original series: "Amanda" (1984); Reboot: "The British Are Coming" (2021)
- Last appearance: Original series: "The Rig" (1987); Reboot: "Catch 22" (2022)
- Created by: Richard and Esther Shapiro
- Eliza Bennett as Amanda Carrington
In-universe information
- Other names: Amanda Bedford
- Occupation: Original series: Public relations; Princess of Moldavia; Reboot: Attorney
- Parents: Blake Carrington; Alexis Colby
- Brothers: Adam Carrington; Steven Carrington
- Sisters: Fallon Carrington Colby
- Half-sisters: Krystina Carrington
- Spouse: Michael of Moldavia (1985–1986)
- Grandparents: Tom Carrington; Ellen Carrington
- Aunts and uncles: Ben Carrington; Dominique Deveraux; Caress Morell
- Nieces and nephews: L.B. Colby; Lauren Colby; Danny Carrington
- First cousins: Leslie Carrington; Jackie Deveraux

Amanda Carrington is a fictional character from the ABC prime time soap opera Dynasty, created by Richard and Esther Shapiro. She was portrayed by Catherine Oxenberg for two seasons from 1984 to 1986, and then by Karen Cellini for 13 episodes from 1986 to 1987. Eliza Bennett plays Amanda in the CW reboot series Dynasty from 2021 to 2022.

== Original series ==
Amanda was originated by Catherine Oxenberg in the 1984 fifth-season episode "Amanda". Oxenberg vacated the role in 1986, during the period between the production of seasons six and seven. Purportedly due to a salary dispute, Oxenberg's publicist insisted that the actress left Dynasty voluntarily, while several media outlets reported that she was fired.

The role was immediately recast with Karen Cellini, who appeared for 13 episodes of the series' seventh season before the character was written out in the 1987 episode "The Rig".

Amanda did not appear in the 1991 miniseries continuation Dynasty: The Reunion.

=== Storylines ===
==== Season five ====
Close on the heels of Fallon Carrington's disappearance and presumed death in a plane crash, a young woman named Amanda Bedford appears in the penthouse of Alexis Colby, Fallon's mother, in "Amanda". Raised primarily by Alexis' cousin Rosalind Bedford, she is Alexis' daughter, come to Denver from England to give her mother support after Alexis' recent arrest and acquittal for the murder of Mark Jennings. (Note: Amanda's arrival is foreshadowed in the season four episode "The Birthday" when Alexis mentions that she has been through four pregnancies. Krystle notes the discrepancy (at this time, Alexis is known to have just three children, Adam, Fallon and Steven), but Alexis explains that one resulted in a miscarriage. Amanda appears 11 episodes later in "Amanda.")

As news of Alexis' "new" daughter spreads, ex-husband Blake takes a special interest, soon learning that Alexis had been pregnant when he had exiled her from Denver almost two decades earlier. Though Alexis insists that Amanda's father is a ski instructor with whom she was involved, it is eventually revealed that she is indeed Blake's daughter and that Alexis kept her hidden from him as revenge for being banished years before.

Amanda is attracted to Alexis' fiancé Dex Dexter, and attempts to seduce him. When they find themselves snowed in together in a remote cabin, they give in to their feelings and have sex. Immediately afterwards, Dex regrets his actions and announces that he and Alexis will marry.

Sullen and depressed, Amanda is invited by Blake to a conference in Acapulco, where she meets the handsome Prince Michael of Moldavia. Alexis, who had known Michael's father King Galen years ago, encourages the relationship. Amanda learns that Michael is engaged to Elena, a Moldavian duchess, but he assures Amanda that it had been a loveless match. Michael proposes and Amanda, despite her lingering feelings for Dex, accepts.

During their engagement, Amanda is almost kidnapped by Moldavian rebels but rescued by Dex. In the 15 May 1985 season finale "Royal Wedding", the rebels undertake a large-scale coup, interrupting the wedding in an attempt to kill Galen. Terrorists spray the chapel with gunfire, leaving the entire wedding party seemingly dead or dying on the floor.

==== Season six ====
Amanda, Michael and the rest of the Carrington family survive the attack, though Luke Fuller—the gay lover of Amanda's brother Steven—and family friend Lady Ashley Mitchell are killed. Galen is missing and presumed dead, and rightful heir Michael is forced to leave the country.

Exile, however, puts a strain on Amanda and Michael's marriage, as he and Alexis become obsessed with rescuing Galen (who is being held for ransom) and restoring the monarchy. Amanda and Dex are drawn closer as Amanda catches Michael and Elena in a compromising position and Dex catches Alexis with a crown, imagining herself as Queen of Moldavia. Amanda finds a drunken Dex and they have sex again—only to be caught in the act by Alexis. Alexis and Dex divorce, as do Amanda and Michael. After Alexis discovers that Galen has in fact been manipulating her, the Moldavian royal family leaves for Lisbon and is never heard from again.

Amanda is devastated when Dex does not want to pursue a relationship with her. She romances Clay Fallmont, but their family rivalry drives him into the arms of Steven's ex-wife Sammy Jo. Amanda is involved in a drunk driving incident which is covered up by Blake; estranged from her mother and feeling isolated from her family, Amanda eventually attempts suicide. She survives, and reconciles with a forgiving Alexis. Amanda decides to pursue Clay again. In the 1986 season finale episode "The Choice (a.k.a.) The Vendetta", Sammy Jo catches Amanda and Clay kissing at the La Mirage hotel; the women fight, winding up in the swimming pool in their party dresses. Meanwhile, Amanda's sister-in-law Claudia Carrington accidentally sets the hotel on fire.

==== Season seven ====
In the seventh season premiere episode "The Victory", Amanda (Note: Starting in "The Victory" (September 24, 1986), the role of Amanda was played by Karen Cellini. To facilitate a recap of the previous episode, part of the pool fight scene originally filmed with Catherine Oxenberg from the previous season's finale episode was re-shot with Cellini.) is trampled in the chaos surrounding the fire but rescued by a mysterious stranger. He turns out to be Michael Culhane, her father's former chauffeur who had been fired (and beaten up by Blake's thugs) in the first season for having an affair with Fallon. Now grateful to Michael, Blake offers him his job back, but is no happier than before when Michael and Amanda begin dating. Amanda is warned about Michael by sister Fallon, but refuses to leave him. Eventually, an upset and confused Amanda learns that Michael has become wealthy and is using her to get to Blake, and she is last seen in "The Rig" on January 7, 1987. In "The Portrait", Blake offhandedly explains to Michael that Amanda has returned to England "to think". The character never appears or is mentioned again during the series.

=== Reception ===
Oxenberg won two Soap Opera Digest Awards in 1985, for Outstanding Supporting Actress and Outstanding Female Newcomer.

== Reboot ==
In August 2021, it was announced that Eliza Bennett would play Amanda in the CW reboot series Dynasty. Bennet debuted in the August 2021 episode "The British Are Coming".

=== Storylines ===
==== Season four ====
In the 2021 season four episode "Equal Justice for the Rich", Alexis Colby (Elaine Hendrix) confesses to Dominique Deveraux (Michael Michele) that she had an affair with a yoga instructor when still married to Blake Carrington (Grant Show) that led to the conception of a child. Alexis went to Europe for six months to give birth in secret, then relinquished the baby girl to a cousin to raise as her own.

Amanda (Eliza Bennett) first visits Atlanta the same season in "The British Are Coming". She is an intelligent attorney from London in her late 20's with an Oxford degree and many questions for Alexis. Her adoptive mother's recent death has revealed the truth of her parentage, and she is not shy about having the gaps filled in. Blake senses he is Amanda's biological father and proves it with a DNA test. She quickly sets her parents straight, refusing to be used as a pawn in their ongoing feud, but remains in town to establish a new career and get to know her family. Relations with her sister Fallon (Elizabeth Gillies) and brother Adam (Sam Underwood) have a rocky start as neither trusts her. In "A Good Marriage in Every Sense", Amanda reveals she had a same sex affair with a judge that ended her position at a British law firm. This candor breaks some ice with Fallon, who appreciates her sister's smarts and ability to party when off the clock. Adam remains an enemy, but Amanda joins his hospital's legal team to keep him in check, then makes bonds with Alexis, Blake, and Cristal (Daniella Alonso). By the end of season four, she has officially changed her surname to Carrington.

==== Season five ====
Amanda's storylines in the final season include proving Alexis's innocence against murder charges, getting Adam ousted from the hospital staff, and falling in love with Kirby Anders (Maddison Brown). She does her best to rise above the family's constant ploys and maintain a level head to deal with all the drama. By the finale, Amanda has left Atlanta for a prestigious job back in London, but returns to attend the wedding of Michael Culhane (Robert Christopher Riley) and mend her strained relationship with Kirby.

=== Reception ===
Jay Snow of Collider wrote positively about the addition of Amanda, specifically her sibling rivalry with Adam, bringing out another side to Alexis, and her blossoming romance with Kirby. "As the newest introduction to the Carrington family, Amanda has had a steep learning curve, but we've really learned a lot about her as she's worked her way into the family", Snow writes, adding that, "The writers are doing all of the right things with Amanda (except not letting her interact with Fallon more), and her future is rather bright.
