= Dynasty season 2 =

Dynasty season 2 may refer to:

- Dynasty (1981 TV series) season 2
- Dynasty (2017 TV series) season 2
