= Dynasty (1981 TV series) season 1 =

Dynasty
- Season 1
- No. of episodes: 15

Release
- Original network: ABC
- Original release: January 12 – April 20, 1981

Season chronology
- Next → Season 2

The first season of Dynasty originally aired in the United States on ABC from January 12 through April 20, 1981. The series, created by Richard and Esther Shapiro and produced by Aaron Spelling, revolves around the Carringtons, a wealthy family residing in Denver, Colorado.

Season one stars John Forsythe as millionaire oil magnate Blake Carrington; Linda Evans as his new wife Krystle; Pamela Sue Martin as Blake's headstrong daughter Fallon; Al Corley as Blake's earnest son Steven; John James as playboy Jeff Colby; Wayne Northrop as Carrington chauffeur Michael Culhane; Bo Hopkins as Denver–Carrington geologist Matthew Blaisdel; Pamela Bellwood as Matthew's troubled wife Claudia; Katy Kurtzman as Matthew and Claudia's teenage daughter Lindsay Blaisdel; and Dale Robertson as wildcatter Walter Lankershim. Notable recurring performers include Lee Bergere as Carrington majordomo Joseph Anders, and Lloyd Bochner as Jeff's uncle, Cecil Colby.

== Development ==
Aaron Spelling, already well known for his successful ABC series, including Starsky and Hutch, Charlie's Angels, The Love Boat, Fantasy Island, Vega$ and Hart to Hart, took on Richard and Esther Shapiro's vision of a rich and powerful family who "lived and sinned" in a 48-room Denver mansion. Esther Shapiro said that an inspiration for the show was I, Claudius, a fictionalized depiction of the Julio-Claudian dynasty of Roman emperors. Shapiro said in 1985, "We wanted to do something that would be fun, an American fantasy. We thought people had seen enough stories where families fell apart. We wanted a strong, nineteenth-century sort of family where people were in conflict but loved each other in spite of everything."

Intended by ABC to be a competitor for CBS' Dallas, the working title for Dynasty was Oil. In early drafts of the pilot script, the two main families featured in the series were known as the Parkhursts and Corbys; by the time production began, they had been renamed the Carringtons and Colbys. George Peppard was cast as series patriarch Blake Carrington, but ultimately had difficulties dealing with the somewhat unsympathetic role, and was quickly replaced with John Forsythe. Filmed in 1980, the pilot was among many delayed due to a strike precipitated by animosity between the television networks and the partnership of the Screen Actors Guild and the American Federation of Television and Radio Artists. Dynasty finally premiered on ABC as a three-hour event on January 12, 1981. The first season was ranked #28 in the United States.

Esther Shapiro later said in the DVD commentary of the first season, "The audience told us almost immediately: All they wanted to do was be in the mansion. [They] couldn't care less about the oil fields. They didn't want to see grubby rooms."

== Plot ==
As Dynasty begins, powerful oil tycoon Blake Carrington is about to marry the younger Krystle Jennings, his former secretary. Beautiful, earnest and new to Blake's world, Krystle finds a hostile reception in the Carrington household—the staff patronizes her, and Blake's headstrong and promiscuous daughter Fallon resents her. Though devoted to Krystle, Blake himself is too preoccupied with his company, Denver-Carrington, and blind to Krystle's predicament. Her only ally is her stepson Steven, whose complicated relationship with Blake stems from their fundamental political differences and Steven's resistance to step into his role as future leader of the Carrington empire. Meanwhile, Fallon, better suited to follow in Blake's footsteps, is (as a woman) underestimated by and considered little more than a trophy to her father. She channels her energies into toying with various male suitors, including the Carrington chauffeur Michael Culhane. At the end of the three-hour premiere episode "Oil", Steven finally confronts his father, criticizing Blake's capitalistic values and seemingly amoral business practices. Blake explodes, revealing the secret of which Steven thought his father was unaware: Blake is disgusted by Steven's homosexuality, and his refusal to "conform" sets father and son at odds for some time.

In counterpoint to the Carringtons are the Blaisdels; Denver-Carrington geologist Matthew—unhappily married to the emotionally fragile Claudia—is Krystle's ex-lover. Returning from an extended assignment in the Middle East, Matthew quits and goes into business with wildcatter Walter Lankershim. As Blake's behavior begins pushing Krystle toward Matthew, the men are set as both business and romantic rivals. Blake is further enraged when Steven goes to work for longtime friend Matthew, in whom Steven sees qualities lacking in Blake. Though previously in a relationship with another man, Steven finds himself drawn to Claudia, who is putting her life back together after spending time in a psychiatric hospital.

Fallon makes a secret business deal with Blake's old friend and more-powerful business rival Cecil Colby, marrying his nephew Jeff to secure Cecil's financial assistance for her father. When Blake stumbles upon Steven in an innocent goodbye embrace with his former lover Ted Dinard (Mark Withers), Blake angrily pushes the two men apart; Ted falls backward and hits his head, the injury proving fatal. Blake is arrested and charged with murder, and an angry Steven testifies that Ted's death had been the result of malicious intent. A veiled surprise witness for the prosecution appears in the season finale "The Testimony", and Fallon gasps in recognition: "Oh my God, that's my mother!"

== Cast ==
=== Main ===
- John Forsythe as Blake Carrington
- Linda Evans as Krystle Carrington
- Pamela Sue Martin as Fallon Carrington
- Pamela Bellwood as Claudia Blaisdel
- Al Corley as Steven Carrington
- John James as Jeff Colby
- Wayne Northrop as Michael Culhane
- Katy Kurtzman as Lindsay Blaisdel
- Dale Robertson as Walter Lankershim (Note: Robertson is credited in every episode as "special guest star".)
- Bo Hopkins as Matthew Blaisdel

=== Recurring ===
- Lee Bergere as Joseph Anders
- Peter Mark Richman as Andrew Laird
- Virginia Hawkins as Jeanette Robbins
- Lloyd Bochner as Cecil Colby
- Paul Jenkins as Ed Cleves
- Betty Harford as Hilda Gunnerson
- Mark Withers as Ted Dinard
- Brian Dennehy as Jake Dunham

=== Notable guest stars ===
- Lloyd Haynes as Judge Horatio Quinlan

Cast notes

== Episodes ==
No. overall	No. in season	Title	Directed by	Written by	Original release date	Prod. code	Rating/share (households)
1	1	"Oil"	Ralph Senensky	Richard and Esther Shapiro	January 12, 1981	S-001	22.2/32
2	2	"Oil"	Ralph Senensky	Richard and Esther Shapiro	January 12, 1981	S-001	22.2/32
3	3	"Oil"	Ralph Senensky	Richard and Esther Shapiro	January 12, 1981	S-001	22.2/32
Wealthy oil tycoon Blake Carrington and his former secretary Krystle Jennings are getting married. Krystle's ex-boyfriend, Matthew Blaisdel, who has been working as a geologist on one of Blake's oil rigs in the Mideast for a year and a half, returns to Denver and accidentally runs into Krystle. They both start thinking that there may be a spark left from their previous relationship, and Krystle begins getting second thoughts about the wedding. Blake's children, Steven and Fallon Carrington, also return to Denver after being away. Fallon is less than excited about her father's impending wedding, and things are icy between Blake and Steven. Matthew has a visit from his old friend, wildcatter Walter Lankershim, who asks for money because his business is in trouble. Walter has lent money from Blake to drill for oil, but he has yet to make any strikes. Matthew goes to visit his wife, Claudia, who has been in a mental institution for 18 months, but learns that she has been released. Matthew, Claudia, and their teenage daughter, Lindsay decide to renew their lives as a family. Blake and Krystle talk about their disagreements, and start planning a big wedding. When Walter's oil rig is sabotaged, he suspects Blake. When Steven confronts Blake about his business practices, Blake explodes. His conflict with Steven is centered on Blake's difficulty in accepting a homosexual relationship Steven had in New York. Blake and Krystle finally get married at the mansion, and among the guests are millionaire Cecil Colby and his nephew Jeff. Cecil is an oilman like Blake, but his company ColbyCo Oil is much bigger than Blake's company, Denver-Carrington. When Blake and Krystle are leaving the Carrington mansion after the wedding, Walter arrives and accuses Blake. When Matthew takes Walter's side in the argument, Blake fires him. Note: The three parts of "Oil" originally aired as a three-hour movie. Dynasty aired on Mondays for all of season one.
4	4	"The Honeymoon"	Robert C. Thompson	Story by : Chester Krumholz; Teleplay by : Edward De Blasio & Chester Krumholz	January 19, 1981	S-002	21.0/30
Blake and Krystle have to abruptly end their honeymoon so that Blake can deal with a work crisis. Walter smooths over his troubles with the workers on his rig, and hires both Matthew and Steven, which Blake does not like. Krystle is having problems adjusting to life as a Carrington, made especially challenging by the imperious majordomo Joseph. Matthew and Claudia are also having difficulty starting their new life. Cecil and Fallon have negotiations of their own; Cecil is willing to help Blake out of his problems if Fallon marries Jeff.
5	5	"The Dinner Party"	Don Medford	Chester Krumholz	January 26, 1981	S-003	18.4/26
Blake apologizes to Walter and Matthew, and asks Matthew to come back to his old job. He also invites them to a dinner party at the mansion, during which Steven and Claudia meet and get along very well; Matthew tells Krystle that he is still in love with her, which Fallon overhears; and Cecil and Fallon start realizing their plans as Fallon starts hitting on Jeff.
6	6	"Fallon's Wedding"	Philip Leacock	Story by : Richard Shapiro; Teleplay by : Edward De Blasio & Norman Katkov	February 2, 1981	S-004	20.4/28
Cecil helps Blake with his money problems. Jeff and Fallon get married in Las Vegas. Blake's driver Michael Culhane, who has been sleeping with Fallon, is a bit jealous when she spurns him. Blake hires Michael to do undercover work for Denver-Carrington. Steven is visited by his ex-lover, Ted Dinard, from New York.
7	7	"The Chauffeur Tells a Secret"	Ralph Senensky	Edward De Blasio	February 16, 1981	S-005	16.0/23
Michael tells Blake about Fallon's deal with Cecil. Steven and Claudia kiss. Note: Dynasty was preempted by part 2 of East of Eden on February 9, 1981.
8	8	"The Bordello"	Philip Leacock	Edward De Blasio	February 23, 1981	S-006	15.4/22
Walter takes Steven to a bordello to "make a man out of him" and put an end to the anti-gay taunts from the other rig workers. Blake puts key holdings in Krystle's name to save his business, and she pawns an expensive necklace Blake gave her to help Matthew.
9	9	"Krystle's Lie"	Don Medford	Edward De Blasio	March 2, 1981	S-007	18.7/29
Matthew discovers that Blake paid one of his workers to sabotage the oil rig and blame it on Steven. A furious Blake tries to find out who helped Matthew, and he rages when he discovers Krystle's birth control pills. Note: "Krystle's Lie" and "The Necklace" originally aired as a combined two-hour broadcast.
10	10	"The Necklace"	Philip Leacock	Edward De Blasio	March 2, 1981	S-008	18.7/29
Michael tells Fallon that Krystle pawned her necklace and gave the money to Matthew. Steven answers Claudia's call to pick her up from a singles bar, and they sleep together.
11	11	"The Beating"	Don Medford	Edward De Blasio	March 9, 1981	S-009	17.5/26
Steven moves out of the mansion and agrees to work for Blake at Denver-Carrington. Lindsay discovers that Claudia slept with Steven. Blake learns that Michael has been sleeping with Fallon, and has the chauffeur brutally beaten.
12	12	"The Birthday Party"	Burt Brinckerhoff	Edward De Blasio and Richard Shapiro	March 16, 1981	S-010	18.3/28
Michael tells Blake that Krystle pawned her necklace and gave the money to Matthew. Outraged over Cecil's deal with Fallon, a drunken Jeff makes a scene at Cecil's birthday party.
13	13	"The Separation"	Gabrielle Beaumont	Edward De Blasio	March 23, 1981	S-011	17.9/26
Ted returns to Denver and meets Claudia to talk about Steven. Krystle leaves Blake. Steven ends his relationship with Ted, but an irate Blake witnesses their goodbye hug. Blake pulls Ted off of Steven, but Ted hits his head and dies.
14	14	"Blake Goes to Jail"	Don Medford	Edward De Blasio	April 13, 1981	S-012	16.3/25
Blake is arrested for the murder of Ted Dinard, and Krystle returns to support him. To save Blake from a murder conviction, Fallon testifies that Ted tripped and hit his head. Steven takes the stand and accuses Fallon of lying. Dynasty was preempted respectively by a John Denver and George Burns special called Two of a Kind and by part 2 of Masada on March 30 and April 6, 1981.
15	15	"The Testimony"	Don Medford	Edward De Blasio	April 20, 1981	S-013	18.5/28
Claudia is forced to reveal her affair with Steven on the stand, and an enraged Matthew attacks Blake. Claudia runs away with Lindsay, but they get into a car accident. The prosecution calls a new witness, and a mysterious woman in a white hat and veil enters. Fallon recognizes the woman as her mother. Note: Blake's ex-wife Alexis makes her first appearance near the end of the episode, unnamed and played by uncredited actress Maggie Wickman. "The Testimony" is the last episode to air on a Monday, and Dynasty moves to Wednesdays for season two.

== Reception ==
The first season of Dynasty was "modestly popular" among viewers, ranking #28 in the United States with a 19.0 Nielsen rating, while #1 series Dallas achieved a 31.8 rating that season. Season one of Dynasty aired on Monday nights. ABC rebroadcast the season in summer 1981 at 10:00 PM on Wednesdays, the new time slot for season two, and initiated a media blitz to promote the series.
