= Jeff Colby =

- Dynasty and The Colbys character
- John James as Jeff Colby
- Portrayed by: John James
- Duration: 1981–1989, 1991
- First appearance: "Oil" (1981)
- Last appearance: "Catch 22" (1989)
- Created by: Richard and Esther Shapiro
- Spin-off appearances: The Colbys (1985–1987); Dynasty: The Reunion (1991)
In-universe information
- Occupation: Business executive
- Father: Jason Colby
- Mother: Francesca Scott
- Brothers: Miles Colby
- Sisters: Monica Colby; Bliss Colby
- Wife: Fallon Carrington; Kirby Anders; Nicole Simpson
- Children: L.B. Colby; Lauren Colby
- Grandfathers: Andrew Colby
- Uncles: Cecil Colby; Philip Colby
- Aunts: Constance Colby; Sable Scott Colby
- Nieces and nephews: Danny Carrington

Jeffrey Broderick "Jeff" Colby is a fictional character on the ABC prime time soap opera Dynasty, created by Richard and Esther Shapiro. Portrayed by John James, Jeff Colby was introduced in the show's first episode in 1981 and appeared as a series regular for six seasons until transferring to the spin-off companion series, The Colbys. The character returned to Dynasty upon the cancellation of The Colbys in 1987 and remained with the series until its final episode in 1989. James later reprised his role for the 1991 miniseries, Dynasty: The Reunion.

In The CW's 2017 Dynasty reboot, Jeff is portrayed by Sam Adegoke. In this series, Jeff is the brother of Monica Colby (Wakeema Hollis) and the son of Cesil Colby (Hakeem Kae-Kazim) and Dominique Deveraux (Michael Michele), who is the half-sister of Blake Carrington (Grant Show).

== Original series ==
Dynasty debuted in January 1981, with John James portraying Jeff Colby. Jeff's on-again, off-again love affair with Fallon Carrington (Pamela Sue Martin and then Emma Samms) continues throughout the entire series. Jeff and Fallon (Samms) were spun off onto a separate series called The Colbys in 1985. The Colbys was cancelled after two seasons, and Jeff and Fallon returned to Dynasty for its eighth season in the September 1987 season premiere episode "The Siege". James remained on the series until its final episode in May 1989. He later reprised the role for the 1991 miniseries Dynasty: The Reunion.

People described Jeff as Fallon's "loving-but-unloved" husband in 1982. In the article, James said of the relationship between Jeff and Fallon, "There's an attraction there in two people who know they're wrong for each other".

=== Storylines ===
==== Season 1 ====
Jeff Colby has been raised by his uncle Cecil Colby in Denver, Colorado. He has a fling with childhood friend, Fallon Carrington. Fallon suggests they elope, which they do. Later, Jeff learns that Fallon only married him because Cecil promised to provide financial support for her father Blake's struggling company. Jeff embarrasses her by drunkenly broadcasting the details to a room full of party guests. Fallon feels sympathetic for Jeff, but still doesn't feel she can return his love.

==== Season 2 ====
When Fallon's stepmother Krystle announces she is pregnant, Fallon decides that she and Jeff should have a baby as well. However, Krystle suffers a miscarriage in episode 7. In the following episode Fallon learns that she is now pregnant. She decides to have an abortion, despite Jeff's pleas. Blake finds out and rushes to stop her — but when he arrives he learns that Fallon could not go through with it. Later, Jeff has an affair with Claudia Blaisdel, only to learn that she is spying on Denver-Carrington for Cecil. In episode 15, Fallon and her mother Alexis are involved in a car crash. At the hospital, Fallon goes into premature labor and delivers a baby boy. Fallon and Jeff bring home their son, Blake Carrington Colby, called "Little Blake." In the season cliffhanger, Jeff discovers that his son has been kidnapped.

==== Season 3 ====
Little Blake is returned unharmed, but Jeff learns that uncle Cecil has died after a last-minute marriage to Fallon's mother, Alexis. Jeff goes to work at ColbyCo. Fallon's jealous brother, Adam, has Jeff's office painted with toxic paint. Gradually, Jeff's behavior becomes increasingly erratic. Fallon hires Joseph's daughter, Kirby, to be her son's nanny. As Fallon's marriage to Jeff deteriorates, she is miffed by Kirby's obvious designs on Jeff. Jeff's behavior becomes more erratic and violent. Jeff attacks Fallon after finding her in Mark's hotel room. Angry and upset, Fallon decides her marriage is finally over. Despite protests from Blake, she flies to Haiti for a divorce in episode 52. Fallon continues her relationship with Mark, while Jeff marries Kirby on the rebound. In episode 51, Alexis sends Jeff away on a vacation. Realizing that Jeff will "recover" when he's not breathing toxic fumes every day, Adam confesses to Alexis. Alexis orders Adam to have the paint removed from Jeff's office. Adam warns his mother that if she betrays him, he will implicate her in the scheme, since Alexis used Jeff's poor health to trick him into signing over his son's shares in Denver-Carrington to her. Fallon learns that Jeff's odd behavior was caused by lead paint poisoning - and suspects Adam of deliberately causing it. She decides to investigate and warns Adam that she will destroy him if he's responsible.

==== Season 4 ====
In episode 71, Jeff learns that Kirby is pregnant with Adam's child. Soon after, Jeff and Kirby divorce. In episode 79, Adam confesses to Jeff his responsibility in the toxic paint's case and pleads with him not to press charges against him. Jeff accepts reluctantly. Fallon reconciles with Jeff and they decide to remarry in episode 84. In episode 88, on the eve of her wedding, Fallon suffers a particularly severe headache. After she fails to appear at the altar, Jeff goes to her room to investigate, only to find her wedding dress crumpled in the corner and the room empty. He glances out the window in time to see Fallon's car speeding off into the night...

==== Season 5 ====
Jeff discovers the wreckage of Fallon's car, but no sign of her. He finds a trucker who gave her a lift to Portland and continues to search for her. He suspects that she is traveling with Peter. In episode 91, Jeff learns that Peter has died when his small twin-engine plane crashed. Investigators tell Jeff that the badly burned remains of a woman were found with him. Jeff goes to make an identification of the body and recognizes Fallon's engagement ring. Heartbroken, Jeff lashes out at her memorial service. Jeff is not 100% convinced that Fallon is dead. While following up on a lead he meets up with Nikki Simpson and they are married. He learns that Nikki lied and they weren't married and he sends her packing. Jeff becomes romantically involved with Lady Ashley Mitchell, a photojournalist. He proposes, but she declines. While attending Amanda Carrington's wedding in Moldavia, they are caught in the terrorist attack at the wedding chapel.

==== Season 6 ====
Jeff is saddened to learn that Ashley was killed in the shooting. Upon returning to Denver, Jeff gets a surprise visit from his aunt, Constance Colby. She has decided to give him her controlling interest in Colby Enterprises, the company she owns with her brother, Jason. Coincidentally, Blake enters a business deal with Jason Colby, and invites the Colbys of California to Denver to celebrate. In episode 124, Jeff is shocked to see Fallon in the courtyard with his cousin Miles.

==== Season 1 ====
Jeff decides to move to California permanently. He is there when Miles arrives with his new bride, "Randall Adams". Jeff is stunned to find Fallon alive and suffering from amnesia. The family decides to let Fallon's memory return on its own — so nobody tells her who she really is. Jeff, however, tries to jog her memory by introducing her to her young son. Fallon's memory returns after she sees Adam in episode 5 of The Colbys. In a hysterical outburst, she accuses Adam of raping her on her wedding night to Jeff. She later remembers that she merely argued with Adam on her wedding night. Because she never fully accepted that she almost had sex with Adam when she knew him as "Michael," that strain combined with her head injury had led to her amnesia. Jeff is also reunited with his long-absent mother, Francesca, who has a past with Jason. Both Miles and Jeff are openly competing for Fallon's affection. Fallon and Jeff grow closer, which upsets Miles. Fallon and Jeff comfort each other during their son's illness in episode 13. After L.B. recovers, Jeff asks Fallon to remarry him (again) and in episode 18 the renew their vows in the Colby mansion, with Blake, Dominique and Steven in attendance. Jeff is arrested for the suspected murder of a business associate of Jason's but he is later cleared of all charges. In the first season finale (episode 24), Fallon tells Jeff that she is pregnant.

==== Season 2 ====
In the second season of The Colbys, Miles marries Channing Carter, a reporter, who quickly becomes jealous of the torch he carries for Fallon. Channing learns that Miles could be the father of Fallon's baby and then reveals it to the family, which divides them further. Miles declares that if he is the father he will fight for custody of the baby. After an argument with Channing, Fallon falls down a flight of stairs and goes into premature labor in episode 41. The baby girl survives and turns out to be Jeff's daughter, much to their joy. When Frankie and Jason prepare to marry, the family is stunned to learn that Jeff's long-lost father, Philip, is alive. Declared MIA in Vietnam years ago, he explains that he remained overseas when he learned that his wife was pregnant with another man's child. Jeff is shocked to learn that Jason, not Philip, is his father. In the final episode of The Colbys, Philip attempts to kidnap Franki. Jason and Jeff chase them in a helicopter causing Philip's car to crash. Frankie is severely injured, but Philip is missing. Jeff angrily tells Jason that if Frankie dies he will never forgive him.

==== Season 8 ====
The next day, Jeff finds Fallon's car abandoned and later finds Fallon miles from her car. Fallon is very upset and she insists that they return to Denver. She eventually confides to Jeff that she believes she was abducted by a UFO. Jeff's disbelief causes them to drift apart. Their marriage is further strained when Fallon learns that Jeff broke her confidence, telling Blake and her cousin, Leslie, about her UFO encounter. When Fallon learns that Jeff slept with Leslie, they divorce again. Jeff becomes both professionally and romantically involved with Sammy Jo, and he proposes. He and Fallon have a one-night stand. The next morning, Sammy Jo comes to Jeff's apartment to accept his proposal, not knowing Fallon is hiding in his bedroom.

==== Season 9 ====
Jeff and Sammy Jo break up. A body is found at the bottom of a lake on the Carrington property. Fallon becomes romantically involved with John Zorelli, the police officer investigating the case — much to Blake and Jeff's dismay. The dead body turns out to be Roger Grimes, the man with whom Alexis was sleeping when she and Blake divorced. He had been dead for 20 years but the cold temperatures in the lake preserved his body. Ultimately, it is revealed that 8-year-old Fallon had shot Roger Grimes after finding him beating Alexis, and Blake's late father Tom Carrington had hidden the body in a mine under the lake to protect Fallon. The situation is complicated by the fact that the mine is full of stolen Nazi treasure, also hidden by Tom. Roger's body had been disturbed from its hiding place by someone looking for the treasure. Jeff and his half-sister Monica Colby grow close when she relocates to Denver. When Adam doctors a photograph to make it look like they are having an incestuous affair, Jeff attacks Adam. Alexis discovers the men fighting and announces that Monica is not Jeff's sister. In the last episode of the series, Blake learns that the police captain investigating the murder of Roger Grimes is behind the search for the treasure. Blake and Jeff attempt to force a confession. The captain pulls a gun, and they both shoot. Blake is left lying in a pool of blood.

=== The Reunion (1991) ===
Three years later, in the Dynasty Reunion movie, Blake is being released from jail for the murder of Captain Handler. Jeff helps Blake attempt to regain control of Denver-Carrington from an international consortium. Meanwhile, Fallon is living in California with Miles. However, she decides again to leave him and reconcile with Jeff.

== Reboot ==
Jeff Colby
- Dynasty character
- Sam Adegoke as Jeff Colby
- Portrayed by: Sam Adegoke
- Duration: 2017–2022
- First appearance: "I Hardly Recognized You" (2017)
- Last appearance: "Catch 22" (2022)
- Created by: Sallie Patrick; Richard and Esther Shapiro
In-universe information
- Occupation: Business executive
- Father: Cesil Colby
- Mother: Dominique Deveraux
- Stepfather: Brady Lloyd
- Sisters: Monica Colby; Vanessa Deveraux (stepsister)
- Wife: Alexis Carrington
- Grandparents: Thomas Carrington; Lo Cox
- Uncles: Blake Carrington; Benjamin Carrington
- First cousins: Adam Carrington; Steven Carrington; Fallon Carrington; Amanda Carrington; Juliette Carrington

A pilot for a Dynasty reboot for The CW was announced in September 2016, and Sam Adegoke was cast as Jeff in May 2017. The new series premiered on The CW on October 11, 2017.

Jeff is one of several characters cast as nonwhite for the reboot. Entertainment Weekly described the reimagined character as "a new-rich tech disruptor played with grinning charisma by Sam Adegoke." The Colbys are newly wealthy, and executive producer Sallie Patrick said that setting them up as competition for the Carringtons would help the show to explore race, class, and gender issues.
