= Wayne Northrop =

American actor (1947–2024)

- Northrop as Michael Culhane on Dynasty (1981)
- Born: Wayne Alan Northrop; April 12, 1947; Sumner, Washington, U.S.
- Died: November 29, 2024 (aged 77); Los Angeles, California, U.S.
- Occupation: Actor
- Years active: 1975–2006
- Spouse: Lynn Herring (m. 1981)
- Children: 2

Wayne Alan Northrop (April 12, 1947 – November 29, 2024) was an American actor known for his parts in soap operas such as Dynasty and Days of Our Lives. Wayne Northrop died on November 29th, 2024 in Los Angeles, California of complications from Alzheimer’s Disease. He was 77 years old.

== Career ==
Northrop portrayed chauffeur Michael Culhane on Dynasty from the pilot episode, "Oil" (1981), until the season one finale, "The Testimony" (1981). He returned in the seventh season premiere "The Victory" (1986), and left again in the 1987 episode "The Sublet".

Northrop is best known as Roman Brady on Days of Our Lives, a character he played from 1981–1984, and again from 1991–1994. He next portrayed Rex Stanton on Port Charles from 1997 to 1998. In August 2005, Northrop returned to Days as a new character named Dr. Alex North.

== Personal life and death ==
Northrop was born in Sumner, Washington, and earned a B.A. in communications from the University of Washington. He married actress Lynn Herring on May 9, 1981, in Jennings, Louisiana. They had two sons: Hank Wayne, born on January 9, 1991, and Grady Lee, born on July 20, 1993.

Northrop died of complications from Alzheimer's disease at the Motion Picture & Television Country House and Hospital, on November 29, 2024, at the age of 77.

== Television filmography ==
- Dynasty as Michael Culhane (1981, 1986–1987) (original cast)
- Days of Our Lives as Roman Brady (1981–1984, 1991–1994)
- Days of Our Lives as André DiMera (1983)
- Port Charles as Rexford "Rex" Stanton (1997–1998)
- Days of Our Lives as Alex North (2005–2006)
