= Dynasty (1981 TV series) season 2 =

Dynasty
- Season 2
- No. of episodes: 22

Release
- Original network: ABC
- Original release: November 11, 1981 – May 5, 1982

Season chronology
- ← Previous; Season 1 Next → Season 3

The second season of Dynasty originally aired in the United States on ABC from November 11, 1981, through May 5, 1982. The series, created by Richard and Esther Shapiro and produced by Aaron Spelling, revolves around the Carringtons, a wealthy family residing in Denver, Colorado.

Season two stars John Forsythe as millionaire oil magnate Blake Carrington; Linda Evans as his wife Krystle; Pamela Sue Martin as Blake and Alexis' headstrong daughter Fallon; Al Corley as Blake and Alexis' earnest son Steven; John James as Fallon's ex-husband Jeff Colby; Lloyd Bochner as Jeff's uncle, Cecil Colby; Pamela Bellwood as Claudia Blaisdel, the widow of Krystle's former lover; Heather Locklear as Krystle's troublemaking niece Sammy Jo; Lee Bergere as Carrington majordomo Joseph Anders; and James Farentino as psychologist Dr. Nicholas Toscanni. The season also introduced Joan Collins as Alexis Carrington, Blake's ex-wife and the mother of Fallon and Steven.

== Development ==
In the first episode of the second season, titled "Enter Alexis", the mysterious witness from the season one finale removes her sunglasses to reveal British actress Joan Collins as a new arrival to the series. Series creators Richard and Esther Shapiro conceived the character as Blake's ex-wife Madeline, who they intended to be played by Sophia Loren for four to six episodes. Writers Eileen and Robert Mason Pollock, brought in for season two, renamed her Alexis, told Aaron Spelling that Loren was not right for the part, and warned him that "If you get rid of this character in four episodes, you are throwing away hundreds of millions of dollars." Collins said in 2018 that in addition to Loren, producers pursued Elizabeth Taylor and Jessica Walter. According to Collins, "They were waiting for Jessica until the very last minute, so they didn't cast me until two weeks before we started shooting."

Collins' Alexis Carrington blazed a trail across the show and its story lines. The additions of Collins and the Pollocks are generally credited with Dynasty's subsequent rise in the Nielsen ratings. Esther Shapiro said in the season one DVD commentary, "When Alexis came into it, it changed the tenor...And that's the way they are now on television: you have your traditional villain, and I think that plays to a different denominator." The Pollocks "soft-pedaled the business angle" of the show and "bombarded viewers with every soap opera staple in the book, presented at such a fast clip that a new tragedy seemed to befall the Carrington family every five minutes." The second season was ranked #19 in the United States.

Corley left Dynasty at the end of the second season in 1982, after complaining publicly in Interview that "Steven doesn't have any fun... He doesn't laugh; he has no humor". Corley also lamented Steven's "ever-shifting sexual preferences", and stated that he wanted "to do other things".

== Plot ==
The surprise witness at Blake's murder trial is his ex-wife Alexis, Fallon and Steven's mother. Her testimony about his character is damaging, and while Fallon is icy to the mother she feels abandoned her, Steven is drawn to Alexis. The former Mrs. Carrington's testimony notwithstanding, Krystle is immediately put off by Alexis' condescending attitude and manipulations. Later, Krystle's discovery that Alexis had caused her miscarriage by intentionally startling her horse with a gunshot settles Alexis as Krystle's implacable nemesis. Other new characters of the season are the psychiatrist Nick Toscanni, who tries to seduce Krystle while bedding Fallon and plotting against Blake; and Krystle's greedy niece Sammy Jo Dean (Heather Locklear), who marries Steven for his money. The season finale sees Blake left for dead on a mountain after a fight with Nick.

== Cast ==
=== Main ===
- John Forsythe as Blake Carrington
- Linda Evans as Krystle Carrington
- Pamela Sue Martin as Fallon Carrington Colby
- Pamela Bellwood as Claudia Blaisdel
- Al Corley as Steven Carrington
- John James as Jeff Colby
- Lloyd Bochner as Cecil Colby (Note: Bochner is added to the opening credits from "Fallon's Father" (ep. 2.4).)
- Heather Locklear as Sammy Jo Carrington (Note: Locklear is added to the opening credits from "Reconciliation" (ep. 2.5). She departs in "The Gun" (ep. 2.18), although she remains credited in "The Fragment" (ep. 2.19).)
- Lee Bergere as Joseph Anders
- Joan Collins as Alexis Carrington
- James Farentino as Dr. Nick Toscanni (Note: Farentino is added to the opening credits from "Alexis' Secret" (ep. 2.3).)

=== Recurring ===
- Peter Mark Richman as Andrew Laird
- Betty Harford as Hilda Gunnerson
- Virginia Hawkins as Jeanette Robbins
- Lance LeGault as Ray Bonning
- Hank Brandt as Morgan Hess
- Tim O'Connor as Thomas Crayford
- Paul Keenan as Tony Driscoll

=== Notable guest stars ===
- Lloyd Haynes as Judge Horatio Quinlan
- Brian Dennehy as Jake Dunham
- Diana Douglas as Mother Blaisdel
- John Saxon as Rashid Ahmed
- Viveca Lindfors as Adriana
- Christine Belford as Susan Farragut

Cast notes

== Episodes ==
| No. overall | No. in season | Title | Directed by | Written by | Original release date | Prod. code | Rating/share (households) |
|---|---|---|---|---|---|---|---|
| 16 | 1 | "Enter Alexis" | Gabrielle Beaumont | Story by : Eileen Mason and Robert Pollock; Teleplay by : Edward De Blasio | November 11, 1981 | S-014 | 18.8/32 |
Dynasty moved from Monday nights to Wednesdays for season two. Dynasty was preempted by the two-hour series premiere of The Fall Guy on November 4, 1981.
| 17 | 2 | "The Verdict" | Gabrielle Beaumont | Story by : Eileen Mason and Robert Pollock; Teleplay by : Edward De Blasio | November 18, 1981 | S-015 | 22.7/39 |
| 18 | 3 | "Alexis' Secret" | Richard Kinon | Story by : Eileen Mason and Robert Pollock; Teleplay by : Edward De Blasio | November 25, 1981 | S-016 | 17.7/31 |
| 19 | 4 | "Fallon's Father" | Bob Sweeney | Story by : Eileen Mason and Robert Pollock; Teleplay by : Mann Rubin | December 2, 1981 | S-017 | 20.9/35 |
| 20 | 5 | "Reconciliation" | Jerome Courtland | Story by : Eileen Mason and Robert Pollock; Teleplay by : Edward De Blasio | December 9, 1981 | S-018 | 18.5/31 |
| 21 | 6 | "Viva Las Vegas" | Alf Kjellin | Story by : Eileen Mason and Robert Pollock; Teleplay by : Edward De Blasio | December 16, 1981 | S-019 | 18.5/30 |
| 22 | 7 | "The Miscarriage" | Irving J. Moore | Story by : Eileen Mason and Robert Pollock; Teleplay by : Edward De Blasio | December 23, 1981 | S-020 | 17.3/32 |
| 23 | 8 | "The Mid-East Meeting" | Gabrielle Beaumont | Story by : Eileen Mason and Robert Pollock; Teleplay by : Elisabeth & Richard Wilson | January 6, 1982 | S-021 | 18.5/29 |
Dynasty was preempted by the ABC Wednesday Night Movie Summer Solstice on December 30, 1981.
| 24 | 9 | "The Psychiatrist" | Irving J. Moore | Story by : Eileen Mason and Robert Pollock; Teleplay by : Shimon Wincelberg | January 13, 1982 | S-022 | 20.7/32 |
| 25 | 10 | "Sammy Jo and Steven Marry" | Jerome Courtland | Story by : Eileen Mason and Robert Pollock; Teleplay by : Edward De Blasio | January 20, 1982 | S-023 | 19.4/32 |
| 26 | 11 | "The Car Explosion" | Irving J. Moore | Story by : Eileen Mason and Robert Pollock; Teleplay by : Edward De Blasio | January 27, 1982 | S-024 | 20.3/34 |
| 27 | 12 | "Blake's Blindness" | Jeff Bleckner | Story by : Eileen Mason and Robert Pollock; Teleplay by : Lorraine Despres | February 3, 1982 | S-025 | 19.6/32 |
| 28 | 13 | "The Hearing" | Bob Sweeney | Story by : Eileen Mason and Robert Pollock; Teleplay by : Shimon Wincelberg | February 10, 1982 | S-026 | 19.7/32 |
| 29 | 14 | "The Iago Syndrome" | Jerome Courtland & Alf Kjellin | Story by : Eileen Mason and Robert Pollock; Teleplay by : Shimon Wincelberg | February 17, 1982 | S-027 | 21.3/35 |
| 30 | 15 | "The Party" | Gwen Arner | Story by : Eileen Mason and Robert Pollock; Teleplay by : Edward De Blasio | February 24, 1982 | S-028 | 21.0/34 |
| 31 | 16 | "The Baby" | Jerome Courtland | Story by : Eileen Mason and Robert Pollock; Teleplay by : Edward De Blasio | March 3, 1982 | S-029 | 21.8/35 |
| 32 | 17 | "Mother and Son" | Lawrence Dobkin | Story by : Eileen Mason and Robert Pollock; Teleplay by : Edward De Blasio | March 17, 1982 | S-030 | 23.0/41 |
Dynasty was preempted by a repeat of the two-hour series premiere of The Fall Guy on March 10, 1982.
| 33 | 18 | "The Gun" | Philip Leacock | Story by : Eileen Mason and Robert Pollock; Teleplay by : Edward De Blasio | March 24, 1982 | S-031 | 23.7/42 |
| 34 | 19 | "The Fragment" | Irving J. Moore & Edward Ledding | Story by : Eileen Mason and Robert Pollock; Teleplay by : Edward De Blasio | April 7, 1982 | S-032 | 21.0/35 |
Dynasty was preempted by a Cheryl Ladd special called Scenes from a Special on March 31, 1982.
| 35 | 20 | "The Shakedown" | Philip Leacock | Story by : Eileen Mason and Robert Pollock; Teleplay by : Daniel King Benton | April 14, 1982 | S-033 | 20.8/36 |
| 36 | 21 | "The Two Princes" | Irving J. Moore | Story by : Eileen Mason and Robert Pollock; Teleplay by : Edward De Blasio | April 28, 1982 | S-034 | 21.4/35 |
Dynasty was preempted by an ABC News Special on Fortress Israel on April 21, 1982. This episode features the final appearance of Al Corley as Steven in the regular series.
| 37 | 22 | "The Cliff" | Jerome Courtland | Story by : Eileen Mason and Robert Pollock; Teleplay by : Edward De Blasio | May 5, 1982 | S-035 | 22.7/38 |

== Reception ==
In season two, Dynasty made it to the Top 20, and was ranked #19 in the United States with a 20.2 Nielsen rating.
