= Robert Christopher Riley =

American actor

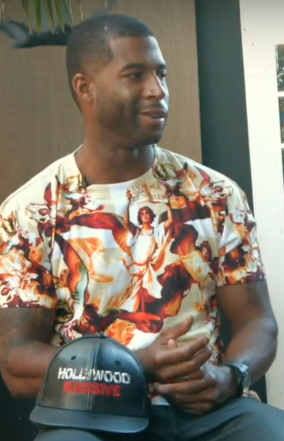
- Robert Christopher Riley in 2016.
- Born: October 11, 1980 (age 45); Brooklyn, New York City, New York
- Occupation: Actor
- Years active: 2006–present
- Partner: Judith Riley (m. 2023)

Robert Christopher Riley (born October 11, 1980) is an American film, television, and stage actor of Trinidadian and Bajan descent. He is known for his role as Terrence Wall in the VH1 television drama series Hit The Floor from 2013 to 2016, and for playing Michael Culhane in The CW's 2017 Dynasty reboot.

== Early life ==
Riley was born and raised in Brooklyn, New York. His mother is from Trinidad and father is from Barbados. Riley attended Brooklyn Technical High School where he participated in the school's drama club and also played safety for the Engineers. He went to college and received his B.A. in Theater from Lehigh University in Bethlehem, Pennsylvania, in 2003. In 2006, he received his Masters in Theater from Ohio University. He played college football and wrote his first theatrical script which he also directed.

== Career ==
From 2013 to 2016, Riley played Terrence Wall in the VH1 television drama series Hit The Floor.

In 2010, he starred as the security guard Derek in an episode of Nickelodeon's Victorious.

On Broadway, Riley played the role of Dave Robinson in Lombardi and starred in the 2009 production of Tennessee Williams Cat On A Hot Tin Roof as Brick, succeeding Terrence Howard in the role. In 2014, he appeared as Jay "The Sport" Jackson in the Old Globe Theatre's production of television writer and producer Marco Ramirez's The Royale. He also played Jared in the 2016 TV One movie Bad Dad Rehab.

In March 2017, Riley was cast in The CW's Dynasty reboot as chauffeur Michael Culhane.

== Filmography ==
=== Film ===
Year	Title	Role	Notes
2006	The Trade Off	Kenny/Ralph	
2007	Over Coffee	Death	Short
2009	The Turtle	Hadlermann	Short
2012	The Bourne Legacy	Outcome #6	
2013	The Spirit Game	Colson	Short
2014	Seasons of Love	Miles	TV movie
2014	Getting Even	Hennessy	
2016	The Perfect Match	Victor	
2016	Bad Dad Rehab	Jared	TV movie
2016	Bring Out the Lady	Vegas	TV movie
2016	Love on the Run	Mr. Handsome	
2016	Destined	Cal/Calvin	
2017	Walk Away From Love	Andre	
2019	My Online Valentine	Ajax	
2019	All In	Lance	
2019	Professor Mack	Christopher Morris	
2019	A Brother's Honor	Dalton	
2021	Naked Singularity	Winston	
2023	The Pass	Maurice	

=== Television ===
Year	Title	Role	Notes
2009	Law & Order: Criminal Intent	Cleon Lewis	Episode: "Faithfully"
2009	Royal Pains	Paramedic #1	Episode: "The Honeymoon's Over"
2009	Medium	Police Officer	Episode: "New Terrain"
2009	Nurse Jackie	Officer #1	Episode: "Sweet-N-All"
2010	Victorious	Derek	Episode: "Stage Fighting"
2011	White Collar	Young Jefferies	Episode: "Dentist of Detroit"
2012	Nurse Jackie	Hot Cop	Episode: "The Wall"
2012	Single Ladies	-	Episode: "The Fabric of Our Lives"
2012	Damages	Mike the Attorney	Episode: "Have You Met the Eel Yet?"
2012	Tyler Perry's For Better or Worse	Harold	Episode: "When Jenny Meets Harold (Part 1)"
2013	Ironside	-	Episode: "Action"
2013-16	Hit the Floor	Terrence Wall	Main Cast: Seasons 1-3
2017	Underground	Hicks	Recurring Cast: Season 2
2017	Elementary	Roy Booker	Recurring Cast: Season 5
2017-22	Dynasty	Michael Culhane	Main Cast
2018	Greenleaf	Agent Dulles	Episode: "The End Is Near"
2022-23	The Game	Chance Worley	Recurring Cast: Season 2
2023	FBI: International	CIA Agent	Episode: "Blood Feud"
2023	True Lies	Tucker	Episode: "Unfamiliar Partnerships"
2023	Survival of the Thickest	Henry	Episode: "For a Bigger Purpose, Bitch."
2025	Beyond the Gates	Carlton	Recurring Cast
2025	Tyler Perry's Divorced Sistas	Javon	Series regular

=== Video Game ===
Year	Title	Role	Notes
2013	Grand Theft Auto V	The Local Population (voice)	

=== Music video ===
Year	Title	Role	Notes
2019	Carry On	Patrice Roberts	Leading Man

=== Documentary ===
Year	Title
2019	Barrow: Freedom Fighter
