= Sallie Patrick =

American screenwriter

- Occupations: Producer; Screenwriter
- Writing career
- Years active: 2008–present
- Notable works: Revenge; Limitless; Dynasty

Sallie Patrick is an American screenwriter and television producer. She was the co-creator, executive producer, and showrunner of Dynasty, a 2017 reboot of the 1980s series of the same name.

== Early life ==
Patrick grew up in Atlanta, Georgia.

== Career ==
Patrick began her career as a writer for television series like Dirty Sexy Money and Life Unexpected. She was later a writer and producer on Revenge and Limitless.

In September 2016, Patrick was announced as executive producer and showrunner for the then-upcoming Dynasty reboot series. Deadline Hollywood reported in May 2019 that co-executive producer Josh Reims would succeed Patrick as showrunner for season three.

== Credits ==
| Year | Title | Position | | |
| Year | Title | Writer | Producer | Notes |
|---|---|---|---|---|
| 2006 | Commander in Chief | No | No | Production staff |
| 2007 | Brothers & Sisters | No | No | Production staff |
| 2007–2009 | Dirty Sexy Money | Yes | Yes | Production staff, wrote 3 episodes |
| 2010–2011 | Life Unexpected | Yes | No | Executive producer, wrote 4 episodes |
| 2011 | No Ordinary Family | Yes | No | Episode: "No Ordinary Double Standard" |
| 2012–2015 | Revenge | Yes | Yes | Supervising producer, executive story editor, wrote 12 episodes |
| 2012 | Dating Rules from My Future Self | Yes | No | Web-series |
| 2015 | Kingmakers | Yes | Yes | TV movie |
| 2015–2016 | Limitless | Yes | Yes | Co-executive producer, wrote 4 episodes |
| 2018 | Snowblind | Yes | No | Short film |
| 2021 | The Lost Symbol | Yes | Yes | Episode: "L'Enfant Orientation", co-executive producer |
| 2017–2022 | Dynasty | Yes | Yes | Creator, executive producer |
| 2025 | Watson | Yes | Yes | Executive producer, wrote episode: "Wait for the Punchline" |
