= Richard and Esther Shapiro =

American screenwriting duo

Richard Shapiro
- Born: Richard Allen Shapiro; June 27, 1934 (age 92); Los Angeles, California, U.S.
- Occupations: Television writer, screenwriter, television producer
- Known for: Dynasty, The Colbys, Dynasty: The Reunion
- Spouse: Esther Shapiro

Esther Shapiro
- Born: Esther June Mayesh; June 6, 1928 (age 98); Brooklyn, New York, U.S.
- Occupations: Television writer, screenwriter, television producer
- Known for: Dynasty, The Colbys, Dynasty: The Reunion
- Spouse: Richard Shapiro

Richard Allen Shapiro (born June 27, 1934) and Esther June Shapiro (née Mayesh; born June 6, 1928) are an American married couple who work as television screenwriters and producers, through their Shapiro Film Corporation. They are best known as the creators of the long-running 1980s prime time soap opera Dynasty, its spin-off series The Colbys, and the 1991 miniseries Dynasty: The Reunion.

In 1984, Doubleday/Dolphin published the companion book Dynasty: The Authorized Biography of the Carringtons, which included an introduction by Esther Shapiro.

== Dynasty ==
The Shapiros created and produced the prime time soap opera Dynasty, which debuted in 1981. Written as the Shapiros' creative response to the 1979 oil crisis, and intended by ABC to be a competitor for CBS's Dallas, the series ranked #28 its first season. Ratings steadily grew, with Dynasty reaching #1 for the 1984–85 season. A spin-off, The Colbys, debuted in 1985, but was cancelled after two seasons. Dynasty was cancelled in 1989, with the Shapiros writing and producing a reunion miniseries in 1991.

During Dynasty's run, the Shapiros also co-created the prime time soap opera Emerald Point N.A.S., which lasted for one season from 1983 to 1984, and the medical drama HeartBeat, which ran two seasons from 1988 to 1989.

At the height of Dynasty's popularity in 1985, Joe Klein of New York called Esther "the ABC network's most valuable asset ... and perhaps the most influential woman executive in television". Dynasty producer Aaron Spelling and others compared Esther to her creation, Blake Carrington (John Forsythe).

== Dynasty legacy ==
In January 2004, Esther Shapiro participated in a marathon of the show's episodes on SOAPnet, Serial Bowl: Alexis vs. Krystle, giving behind-the-scenes tidbits and factoids.

In 2005 Ritchie Singer and Pamela Reed portrayed the Shapiros in Dynasty: The Making of a Guilty Pleasure, a fictionalized ABC television movie based on the creation and behind the scenes production of Dynasty.

The first season of Dynasty was released on Region 1 DVD an April 19, 2005 by 20th Century Fox Home Entertainment. This edition includes audio commentary by Esther Shapiro.

The Shapiros announced on January 12, 2011, that they had written a Dynasty prequel feature film script set in the 1960s, and were shopping it to studios for a possible film franchise. In a September 2011 interview, Dynasty actress Joan Collins chatted about a Dynasty television revival: "I've been in constant contact with Esther Shapiro, who wrote it, and apparently they've written a script."

In September 2016, it was announced that a Dynasty reboot was in development at The CW, with the Shapiros attached as producers. The project received a series order in May 2017, and premiered in the US on October 11, 2017. Dynasty ran for five seasons, ending in September 2022.

== Personal life ==
The Shapiros are Jewish, with Esther's family being Sephardic Jews from Greece and Turkey.

== Credits ==
Year	Project	Position	Notes
1962	Route 66	Co-writers (story credit only, as Richard Shapiro and Esther Mayesh; teleplay by Stirling Silliphant)	Episode: "A Long Piece of Mischief"
1964	Bonanza	Co-writers (as Richard Shapiro and Esther Mayesh)	Episode: "A Dime's Worth of Glory"
1966	Combat!	Writer: Richard Shapiro only	Episode: "Gulliver"
1966–1967	Iron Horse	Co-writers	(2) episodes
1968	Tarzan	Co-writers	(3) episodes
1968	Garrison's Gorillas	Co-writers: Richard Shapiro & Shimon Wincelberg	Episode: "Run from Death"
1969–1970	Land of the Giants	Writer: Richard Shapiro only	(4) episodes
1971	Medical Center	Writer: Richard Shapiro only	(1) episode
1975	Sarah T. – Portrait of a Teenage Alcoholic	Co-writers	Television film
1976	The Great Scout & Cathouse Thursday	Writer: Richard Shapiro only	Film
1977	Intimate Strangers	Co-writers/Co-producers	Television film
1977	Minstrel Man	Co-writers	Television film
1979	The Cracker Factory	Writer/producer: Richard Shapiro only	Television film
1981	East of Eden	Writer: Richard Shapiro only	Miniseries
1981–1989	Dynasty	Co-creators/Co-executive producers	(220) episodes
1983–1984	Emerald Point N.A.S.	Co-creators/Co-executive producers	(22) episodes
1985–1987	The Colbys	Co-creators/Co-executive producers	(49) episodes
1987	Free Spirit	Co-writers	Television film
1988–1989	HeartBeat	Co-creators/Co-executive producers	(18) episodes
1989	When We Were Young	Co-writers	Television film
1991	Dynasty: The Reunion	Co-creators/Co-executive producers	Miniseries
1991	Blood Ties	Writer: Richard Shapiro only Co-executive producers	Television film
1996	The Colony	Co-writers/Co-executive producers	Television film
2017–2022	Dynasty	Co-creators/Co-executive producers	(108) episodes
