= List of Dynasty (2017 TV series) episodes =

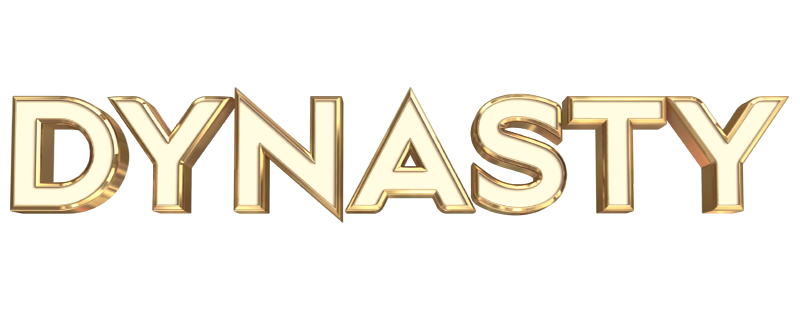
Dynasty's logo

Dynasty is an American television series based on the 1980s prime time soap opera of the same name. Developed by Josh Schwartz, Stephanie Savage, and Sallie Patrick, the first season of the new series stars Elizabeth Gillies as Fallon Carrington, Grant Show as her father Blake Carrington, Nathalie Kelley as Blake's new wife Cristal, and James Mackay as his son Steven, with Robert Christopher Riley as chauffeur Michael Culhane, Sam Adegoke as tech billionaire Jeff Colby, Rafael de la Fuente as Sam "Sammy Jo" Jones, Cristal's nephew and Steven's fiancé, and Alan Dale as Joseph Anders, the Carrington majordomo. The series later introduced Alexis Carrington (Nicollette Sheridan and Elaine Hendrix), Blake's ex-wife and the estranged mother of Steven and Fallon; Anders's daughter Kirby (Maddison Brown); Blake's third wife Cristal Jennings (Ana Brenda Contreras and Daniella Alonso); Blake and Alexis's long-missing son, Adam Carrington (Sam Underwood); Blake's half-sister Dominique Deveraux (Michael Michele), the mother of Jeff and Monica Colby (Wakeema Hollis); Fallon's husband Liam Ridley (Adam Huber); and Amanda Carrington (Eliza Bennett), Alexis's secret daughter by Blake.

The pilot was announced in September 2016, and the reboot received a series order in May 2017. Dynasty premiered on October 11, 2017, on The CW in the United States, and on Netflix internationally the following day. On November 8, 2017, The CW picked up the series for a full season of 22 episodes. On April 2, 2018, The CW renewed the series for a second season, which premiered on October 12, 2018. Dynasty was renewed for a third season on January 31, 2019, which premiered on October 11, 2019. Dynasty was renewed for a fourth season on January 7, 2020, which premiered on May 7, 2021. On February 3, 2021, ahead of its fourth season premiere, The CW renewed the series for a fifth season. During the course of the series, 108 episodes of Dynasty aired, between October 11, 2017, and September 16, 2022.

== Series overview ==
Season	Episodes	Originally released		Rank	Average viewers (in millions inc. DVR)
Season	Episodes	First released	Last released	Rank	Average viewers (in millions inc. DVR)
1	22	October 11, 2017	May 11, 2018	145	1.00
2	22	October 12, 2018	May 24, 2019	141	0.80
3	20	October 11, 2019	May 8, 2020	133	0.59
4	22	May 7, 2021	October 1, 2021	161	0.40
5	22	December 20, 2021	September 16, 2022	140	0.39

== Episodes ==
=== Season 1 (2017–18) ===
Dynasty season 1 episodes
No. overall	No. in season	Title	Directed by	Written by	Original release date	U.S. viewers (millions)
1	1	"I Hardly Recognized You"	Brad Silberling	Sallie Patrick & Josh Schwartz & Stephanie Savage	October 11, 2017	1.26
2	2	"Spit It Out"	Michael A. Allowitz	Sallie Patrick	October 18, 2017	0.92
3	3	"Guilt is for Insecure People"	Kellie Cyrus	Ali Adler	October 25, 2017	0.72
4	4	"Private as a Circus"	Kevin Rodney Sullivan	Jenna Richman	November 1, 2017	0.74
5	5	"Company Slut"	Cherie Nowlan	Christopher Fife	November 8, 2017	0.72
6	6	"I Exist Only for Me"	Lee Rose	Kevin A. Garnett	November 15, 2017	0.64
7	7	"A Taste of Your Own Medicine"	Matt Earl Beesley	Jay Gibson	November 29, 2017	0.64
8	8	"The Best Things in Life"	Pascal Verschooris	Francisca X. Hu	December 6, 2017	0.64
9	9	"Rotten Things"	Brad Silberling	Paula Sabbaga	December 13, 2017	0.69
10	10	"A Well-Dressed Tarantula"	Kenny Leon	Adele Lim	January 17, 2018	0.63
11	11	"I Answer to No Man"	Steven A. Adelson	Gladys Rodriguez	January 24, 2018	0.56
12	12	"Promises You Can't Keep"	Norman Buckley	Christopher Fife & Kevin A. Garnett	January 31, 2018	0.65
13	13	"Nothing but Trouble"	Matt Earl Beesley	Jenna Richman	February 7, 2018	0.65
14	14	"The Gospel According to Blake Carrington"	Dawn Wilkinson	Francisca X. Hu & Paula Sabbaga	March 9, 2018	0.64
15	15	"Our Turn Now"	Matt Earl Beesley	Libby Wells	March 16, 2018	0.60
16	16	"Poor Little Rich Girl"	Kenny Leon	Ali Adler & Jenna Richman	March 23, 2018	0.63
17	17	"Enter Alexis"	Jeff Byrd	Sallie Patrick & Christopher Fife	March 30, 2018	0.69
18	18	"Don't Con a Con Artist"	Carl Seaton	Kevin A. Garnett & Paula Sabbaga	April 6, 2018	0.71
19	19	"Use or Be Used"	Viet Nguyen	Jake Coburn & Jay Gibson	April 20, 2018	0.56
20	20	"A Line from the Past"	Pascal Verschooris	Jenna Richman & Francisca X. Hu	April 27, 2018	0.68
21	21	"Trashy Little Tramp"	Brandi Bradburn	Christopher Fife & Kevin A. Garnett	May 4, 2018	0.55
22	22	"Dead Scratch"	Michael A. Allowitz	Sallie Patrick & Libby Wells	May 11, 2018	0.56

=== Season 2 (2018–19) ===
Dynasty season 2 episodes
No. overall	No. in season	Title	Directed by	Written by	Original release date	U.S. viewers (millions)
23	1	"Twenty-Three Skidoo"	Matt Earl Beesley	Sallie Patrick & Christopher Fife	October 12, 2018	0.64
24	2	"Ship of Vipers"	Kenny Leon	Josh Reims & Jenna Richman	October 19, 2018	0.61
25	3	"The Butler Did It"	Pascal Verschooris	David M. Israel & Paula Sabbaga	October 26, 2018	0.56
26	4	"Snowflakes in Hell"	Mary Lou Belli	Francisca X. Hu & Audrey Villalobos Karr	November 2, 2018	0.55
27	5	"Queen of Cups"	Jeff Byrd	Kevin A. Garnett & Jay Gibson	November 9, 2018	0.60
28	6	"That Witch"	Tessa Blake	Josh Reims & Libby Wells	November 16, 2018	0.66
29	7	"A Temporary Infestation"	Michael A. Allowitz	Jenna Richman	November 30, 2018	0.63
30	8	"A Real Instinct for the Jugular"	Matt Earl Beesley	David M. Israel & Francisca X. Hu	December 7, 2018	0.56
31	9	"Crazy Lady"	Melanie Mayron	Christopher Fife & Paula Sabbaga	December 21, 2018	0.63
32	10	"A Champagne Mood"	Michael A. Allowitz	Josh Reims & Kevin A. Garnett	January 18, 2019	0.59
33	11	"The Sight of You"	Matt Earl Beesley	David M. Israel & Aubrey Villalobos Karr	January 25, 2019	0.58
34	12	"Filthy Games"	Geary McLeod	Francisca X. Hu & Libby Wells	February 1, 2019	0.60
35	13	"Even Worms Can Procreate"	Viet Nguyen	Christopher Fife & Jay Gibson	February 8, 2019	0.61
36	14	"Parisian Legend Has It..."	Pascal Verschooris	Sallie Patrick & Jenna Richman	March 15, 2019	0.47
37	15	"Motherly Overprotectiveness"	Brandi Bradburn	David M. Israel & Paula Sabbaga	March 22, 2019	0.55
38	16	"Miserably Ungrateful Men"	Jeff Byrd	Garrett Oakley & Bryce Schramm	March 29, 2019	0.52
39	17	"How Two-Faced Can You Get"	Joanna Kerns	Christopher Fife & Kevin A. Garnett	April 19, 2019	0.55
40	18	"Life is a Masquerade Party"	Jeff Byrd	Josh Reims & Aubrey Villalobos Karr	April 26, 2019	0.49
41	19	"This Illness of Mine"	Matt Earl Beesley	Francisca X. Hu & Jay Gibson	May 3, 2019	0.39
42	20	"New Lady in Town"	Elodie Keene	David M. Israel	May 10, 2019	0.42
43	21	"Thicker Than Money"	Ken Fink	Jenna Richman & Kevin A. Garnett	May 17, 2019	0.47
44	22	"Deception, Jealousy, and Lies"	Michael A. Allowitz	Christopher Fife & Paula Sabbaga	May 24, 2019	0.53

=== Season 3 (2019–20) ===
Dynasty season 3 episodes
No. overall	No. in season	Title	Directed by	Written by	Original release date	U.S. viewers (millions)
45	1	"Guilt Trip to Alaska"	Michael A. Allowitz	Josh Reims	October 11, 2019	0.45
46	2	"Caution Never Won a War"	Melanie Mayron	David M. Israel	October 18, 2019	0.41
47	3	"Wild Ghost Chase"	Jeff Byrd	Christopher Fife	October 25, 2019	0.42
48	4	"Something Desperate"	Kenny Leon	Jenna Richman	November 1, 2019	0.35
49	5	"Mother? I'm at La Mirage"	Brandi Bradburn	Liz Sczudlo	November 8, 2019	0.35
50	6	"A Used Up Memory"	Matt Earl Beesley	Kevin A. Garnett	November 15, 2019	0.38
51	7	"Shoot from the Hip"	Geoff Shotz	Paula Sabbaga	November 22, 2019	0.44
52	8	"The Sensational Blake Carrington Trial"	Melanie Mayron	Francisca X. Hu	December 6, 2019	0.37
53	9	"The Caviar, I Trust, Is Not Burned"	Jeff Byrd	Aubrey Villalobos Karr	January 17, 2020	0.34
54	10	"What Sorrows Are You Drowning?"	Pascal Verschooris	Libby Wells	January 24, 2020	0.34
55	11	"A Wound That May Never Heal"	Brandi Bradburn	Bryce Schramm	January 31, 2020	0.34
56	12	"Battle Lines"	Matt Earl Beesley	Christopher Fife	February 7, 2020	0.31
57	13	"You See Most Things in Terms of Black & White"	Heather Tom	David M. Israel	February 21, 2020	0.32
58	14	"That Wicked Stepmother"	Brandi Bradburn	Garrett Oakley	February 28, 2020	0.34
59	15	"Up a Tree"	Andi Behring	Jenna Richman	March 27, 2020	0.32
60	16	"Is the Next Surgery on the House?"	Michael A. Allowitz	Liz Sczudlo	April 3, 2020	0.32
61	17	"She Cancelled..."	Pascal Verschooris	Kevin A. Garnett	April 10, 2020	0.38
62	18	"You Make Being a Priest Sound Like Something Bad"	Elodie Keene	Aubrey Villalobos Karr	April 17, 2020	0.30
63	19	"Robin Hood Rescues"	Jeff Byrd	Paula Sabbaga	May 1, 2020	0.32
64	20	"My Hangover's Arrived"	Gina Lamar	Francisca X. Hu	May 8, 2020	0.37

=== Season 4 (2021) ===
Dynasty season 4 episodes
No. overall	No. in season	Title	Directed by	Written by	Original release date	U.S. viewers (millions)
65	1	"That Unfortunate Dinner"	Michael A. Allowitz	Libby Wells	May 7, 2021	0.24
66	2	"Vows Are Still Sacred"	Michael A. Allowitz	Josh Reims & Jenna Richman	May 14, 2021	0.25
67	3	"The Aftermath"	Pascal Verschooris	Christopher Fife	May 21, 2021	0.24
68	4	"Everybody Loves the Carringtons"	Andi Behring	David M. Israel	May 28, 2021	0.19
69	5	"New Hopes, New Beginnings"	Geary McLeod	Jason Ganzel	June 4, 2021	0.23
70	6	"A Little Father-Daughter Chat"	Star Barry	Aubrey Villalobos Karr	June 11, 2021	0.25
71	7	"The Birthday Party"	Kenny Leon	Katrina Cabrera Ortega	June 18, 2021	0.28
72	8	"Your Sick and Self-Serving Vendetta"	Melanie Mayron	Libby Wells	June 25, 2021	0.23
73	9	"Equal Justice for the Rich"	Melanie Mayron	Bryce Schramm	July 2, 2021	0.20
74	10	"I Hate to Spoil Your Memories"	Ayoka Chenzira	Elaine Loh	July 16, 2021	0.26
75	11	"A Public Forum for Her Lies"	Jay Karas	Liz Sczudlo	July 23, 2021	0.25
76	12	"Everything but Facing Reality"	Brandi Bradburn	Garrett Oakley	July 30, 2021	0.26
77	13	"Go Rescue Someone Else"	Heather Tom	Josh Reims & Christopher Fife	August 6, 2021	0.25
78	14	"But I Don't Need Therapy"	Brandi Bradburn	Aubrey Villalobos Karr	August 13, 2021	0.33
79	15	"She Lives in a Showplace Penthouse"	Heather Tom	Katrina Cabrera Ortega	August 20, 2021	0.29
80	16	"The British Are Coming"	Grant Show	David M. Israel	August 27, 2021	0.18
81	17	"Stars Make You Smile"	Michael A. Allowitz	Jason Ganzel	September 3, 2021	0.22
82	18	"A Good Marriage in Every Sense"	Elizabeth Gillies	Bryce Schramm	September 10, 2021	0.26
83	19	"Everything Looks Wonderful, Joseph"	Brandon Lott	Libby Wells	September 17, 2021	0.25
84	20	"You Vicious, Miserable Liar"	Robbie Countryman	Elaine Loh	September 24, 2021	0.30
85	21	"Affairs of State and Affairs of the Heart"	Geoff Shotz	Liz Sczudlo	September 24, 2021	0.21
86	22	"Filled with Manipulations and Deceptions"	Pascal Verschooris	Josh Reims & Garrett Oakley	October 1, 2021	0.22

=== Season 5 (2021–22) ===
Dynasty season 5 episodes
No. overall	No. in season	Title	Directed by	Written by	Original release date	U.S. viewers (millions)
87	1	"Let's Start Over Again"	Michael A. Allowitz	Christopher Fife	December 20, 2021	0.38
88	2	"That Holiday Spirit"	Kenny Leon	Aubrey Villalobos Karr	December 20, 2021	0.31
89	3	"How Did the Board Meeting Go?"	Pascal Verschooris	David M. Israel	March 11, 2022	0.25
90	4	"Go Catch Your Horse"	Star Barry	Libby Wells	March 18, 2022	0.28
91	5	"A Little Fun Wouldn't Hurt"	Andi Behring	Elaine Loh	March 25, 2022	0.20
92	6	"Devoting All of Her Energy to Hate"	Brandi Bradburn	Liz Sczudlo	April 1, 2022	0.23
93	7	"A Real Actress Could Do It"	Ayoka Chenzira	Bryce Schramm	April 8, 2022	0.28
94	8	"The Only Thing That Counts Is Winning"	Heather Tom	Chris Erric Maddox	April 15, 2022	0.26
95	9	"A Friendly Kiss Between Friends"	SM Main-Muñoz	Garrett Oakley	April 29, 2022	0.22
96	10	"Mind Your Own Business"	Heather Tom	Katrina Cabrera Ortega	May 6, 2022	0.21
97	11	"I'll Settle for a Prayer"	Brandi Bradburn	India Sage Wilson	May 13, 2022	0.20
98	12	"There's No Need to Panic"	Robin Givens	David M. Israel	May 20, 2022	0.21
99	13	"Do You Always Talk to Turtles"	Andi Behring	Malcolm Boomer & Chava Friedberg	May 27, 2022	0.23
100	14	"Vicious Vendetta"	Pascal Verschooris	Josh Reims & Christopher Fife	June 3, 2022	0.23
101	15	"Ben"	Brandon Lott	Bryce Schramm	June 24, 2022	0.25
102	16	"My Family, My Blood"	Robbie Countryman	Elaine Loh	July 1, 2022	0.22
103	17	"There's No One Around to Watch You Drown"	Grant Show	Liz Sczudlo	July 8, 2022	0.28
104	18	"A Writer of Dubious Talent"	Heather Tom	Katrina Cabrera Ortega	August 5, 2022	0.24
105	19	"But a Drug Scandal?"	Elizabeth Gillies	Aubrey Villalobos Karr	August 12, 2022	0.22
106	20	"First Kidnapping and Now Theft"	Pat Santana	Chris Erric Maddox	September 2, 2022	0.18
107	21	"More Power to Her"	Michael A. Allowitz	Libby Wells	September 9, 2022	0.17
108	22	"Catch 22"	Pascal Verschooris	Josh Reims & Garrett Oakley	September 16, 2022	0.19

== Ratings ==
Dynasty : U.S. viewers per episode (thousands)

Season	Episode number																					
Season	1	2	3	4	5	6	7	8	9	10	11	12	13	14	15	16	17	18	19	20	21	22
1	1260	920	720	740	720	640	640	640	690	630	560	650	650	640	600	630	690	710	560	680	550	560
2	640	610	560	550	600	660	630	560	630	590	580	600	610	470	550	520	550	490	390	420	470	530
3	450	410	420	350	350	380	440	370	340	340	340	310	320	340	320	320	380	300	320	370	–	
4	240	250	240	190	230	250	280	230	200	260	250	260	250	310	280	180	220	260	250	300	210	220
5	380	310	250	280	200	230	280	260	220	210	200	210	230	230	250	220	280	240	220	180	170	190

Audience measurement performed by Nielsen Media Research
