= List of Dynasty episodes =

List of Dynasty episodes may refer to:

- List of Dynasty (1981 TV series) episodes, a 1981–1989 US drama series
- List of Dynasty (2017 TV series) episodes, a 2017–2022 reboot of the 1981 series
