= The One I Wrote for You =

- Directed by: Andrew Lauer
- Written by: David Kauffman
- Starring: Cheyenne Jackson; Kevin Pollak; Christine Woods; Enid Graham; Avi Lake; Rafael de la Fuente; Cameron Kauffman; Christopher Lloyd
- Release date: December 5, 2014
- Running time: 110 minutes
- Country: United States
- Language: English

The One I Wrote for You is a 2014 American drama film written by David Kauffman, directed by Andrew Lauer and starring Cheyenne Jackson, Kevin Pollak, Christine Woods and Christopher Lloyd.

== Cast ==
- Cheyenne Jackson as Ben Cantor
- Kevin Pollak as Mickey
- Christine Woods as Alicia Cantor
- Christopher Lloyd as Pop
- Avi Lake as Gracie Cantor
- Rafael de la Fuente as Rafael Amato
- Cameron Kauffman as Angel Fender
- Enid Graham as Jan Fender

== Release ==
The film was released in theaters on December 5, 2014.

== Reception ==
Marjorie Baumgarten of The Austin Chronicle awarded the film 2 1/2 stars out of five. Grace Montgomery of Common Sense Media awarded the film two stars out of five.
