= Steven Carrington =

- Dynasty character
- Al Corley as Steven Carrington
- Portrayed by: Al Corley (1981–1982, 1991); Jack Coleman (1982–1988)
- Duration: 1981–1988, 1991
- First appearance: "Oil" (1981)
- Last appearance: "Colorado Roulette" (1988)
- Created by: Richard and Esther Shapiro
- Spin-off appearances: The Colbys (1985–1986); Dynasty: The Reunion (1991)
- Jack Coleman as Steven Carrington
In-universe information
- Occupation: Business executive
- Father: Blake Carrington
- Mother: Alexis Morell
- Stepfather: Cecil Colby; Dex Dexter; Sean Rowan
- Stepmother: Krystle Carrington
- Brothers: Adam Carrington
- Sisters: Fallon Carrington; Amanda Carrington
- Half-sisters: Krystina Carrington
- Spouse: Sammy Jo Carrington; Claudia Blaisdel
- Children: Danny Carrington
- Grandparents: Tom Carrington; Ellen Carrington; Steven Morrell
- Aunts and uncles: Dominique Deveraux; Ben Carrington; Caress Morell
- Nieces and nephews: L.B. Colby; Lauren Colby
- First cousins: Leslie Carrington; Jackie Deveraux

Steven Daniel Carrington is a fictional character on the American prime time soap opera Dynasty. Steven is noteworthy as one of the earliest gay main characters on American television. Despite identifying as homosexual, Steven has relationships with both men and women throughout the series.

The role was originated by Al Corley in the show's first episode in 1981. Corley left at the end of the second season in 1982, and the role was recast in 1983 with Jack Coleman, the change in appearance attributed to plastic surgery after an oil rig explosion. Coleman remained on the show until 1988, but Corley returned to the role of Steven for the 1991 miniseries Dynasty: The Reunion when Coleman was unavailable due to scheduling conflicts.

In the 2017 reboot of the series, Steven is played by actor James Mackay.

== Original series ==
The role of Steven was originated by Al Corley in the show's first episode in 1981; Corley left at the end of the second season in 1982 after complaining about Steven's "ever-shifting sexual preferences" and wanting "to do other things." The character was recast in 1983 with Jack Coleman, the change in appearance attributed to plastic surgery after an oil rig explosion. Coleman remained on the show until 1988, but Corley returned to the role of Steven for the 1991 miniseries Dynasty: The Reunion when Coleman was unavailable due to scheduling conflicts.

=== Impact and criticism ===
==== Making television history ====
Steven has been called the first openly gay character on a prime time drama series, and remains one of the most well-known of the earliest gay characters on television. Suzanna Danuta Walters writes that because of the character, "in the annals of gay TV history, the '80s will be remembered as the Dynasty years." Initially the only son of series patriarch Blake Carrington (John Forsythe), and his first wife Alexis (Joan Collins), "handsome, blond hunk" Steven was a regular character featured in front-burner storylines for his entire run on the series. In contrast to his ruthless, warring parents and promiscuous sister, Fallon (Pamela Sue Martin), the character was poised as "the moral conscience of the family." Still, he was defined primarily by his sexuality, his struggle against it, and the conflict it created within his family.

==== Potential and execution ====
Corley noted, "what attracted me was playing a gay character ... The only gay television character I knew about at the time was Billy Crystal's gay character Jodie Dallas on ABC's Soap, which was a dark comedy." Dynasty co-creator Esther Shapiro noted in a 1981 Esquire magazine article that the character of Steven "was, is, and always will be gay", but explained that she initially intended for him to be confused about his sexuality for two seasons before ultimately becoming a "well-rounded gay character". With Dynasty becoming one of the 20 highest-rated American prime time series by the end of its second season and eventually rising to #1 in 1985, Steven "had great potential for breaking through the usual stereotypes" and his life "could have been explored in storylines in which [his] sexuality did not necessarily have to be problematized." However, it has been noted that with "interference" from network Broadcast Standards and Practices and "pressure from the religious right", this potential was never fully realized. Walters writes that Steven—"stalwartly manly and deeply troubled by his homosexuality"—led viewers on a "Hollywood tour of homosexuality" over eight seasons, "from tortured closet case, to 'cured' heterosexual husband, and finally to a vague approximation of gay and proud." She adds that the character's "persistent attempts to 'go straight' and the adamant avoidance of any gay milieu or culture" paint Dynasty as "flawed and compromised", but acknowledges that the series remains a staple of gay iconography despite its primary gay character being "hardly a role model of self-acceptance and pride."

Corley left Dynasty at the end of the second season in 1982, after complaining publicly in Interview that "Steven doesn't have any fun... He doesn't laugh; he has no humor". Corley also lamented Steven's "ever-shifting sexual preferences", and stated that he wanted "to do other things". The character was recast in 1983 with Jack Coleman, the change in appearance attributed to plastic surgery after an oil rig explosion. Coleman remained on the show until 1988, but Corley returned to the role of Steven for the 1991 miniseries Dynasty: The Reunion when Coleman was unavailable due to scheduling conflicts.

In a 2006 interview with TV Guide, Coleman reaffirmed that having a gay main character on a prime time drama in the early 1980s "was quite daring at that time. I think the only other gay character in a series was Billy Crystal on Soap, and that was a comedy. But [Steven] was so timid by today's standards, especially looking at what's on cable, with The L Word, Queer as Folk and shows like that. Dynasty now seems unbelievably quaint." Commenting on Steven's romantic relationship with Luke Fuller (played by Billy Campbell), Coleman noted, "It was very much The Donna Reed Show in terms of four feet on the floor, nobody actually ever touching."

==== Legacy ====
It has also been suggested that the increased visibility of gay characters like Steven on network series in the late 1970s and 1980s (who owed their own existence to relaxing social restrictions and the 1969 Stonewall riots) sparked a backlash from "fundamentalists who complained to advertisers", and by the spring of 1991 there were no gay characters in evidence at all. This ultimately paved the way for a reversal of the trend and Ellen DeGeneres' watershed coming out in 1997, the subsequent "steady stream of ... well-developed, three-dimensional gay and lesbian characters" on television, and the relative "open door" of the 2000s. David Bitler of MTV's LGBT-targeted channel Logo said in 2005 that "today's youth generation is more accustomed to seeing gay characters on television, because gay visibility in pop culture has only increased exponentially during the last 10 to 15 years" with the depiction of gay and lesbian characters on shows such as Dawson's Creek, Buffy the Vampire Slayer, The Real World and Road Rules becoming commonplace. Comparing Steven's 1981 confrontation with his father over his sexuality to the 2005 coming out of Desperate Housewives teen Andrew Van de Kamp to his mother, Damon Romine of GLAAD noted in a 2005 PlanetOut.com article that though both Blake Carrington and Bree Van de Kamp encourage their sons to "change"—which is not possible—in 1981 this was presented as a "serious suggestion", whereas in 2005 the idea is "ridiculous". Romine added, "That's progress, even though we still have a long way to go." In the same article Jenny Stewart of PlanetOut.com posed the question of whether Steven Carrington "was a groundbreaking first who blazed a trail for the must-see gay TV of the new millennium or a last gasp of the traditional 'gayness as tragedy' storyline."

=== Storylines ===
==== Season 1 ====
As Dynasty begins on January 12, 1981, Carrington heir Steven (Al Corley) returns to Denver from New York City to attend the wedding of his father, powerful oil tycoon Blake Carrington (John Forsythe). Though the details are at first unclear, father and son are somewhat estranged, and their reunion is an awkward one. The Carrington family dynamic is soon established; thoughtful and sensitive Steven resists his father's pressure to step into his role as the future leader of Blake's empire, while his spoiled sister Fallon, better suited to follow in Blake's footsteps, is underestimated by—and considered little more than a trophy to—father Blake. Steven is devoted to and loved by Fallon, who sees the differences between her brother and Blake but does not understand why they cannot be reconciled. Steven, knowing Fallon's devotion to Blake, is hesitant to open up to her. Steven befriends Krystle (Linda Evans), Blake's former secretary and future wife, who is adjusting to life at the mansion despite chilly receptions from Fallon and the Carrington household staff. At the end of the three-hour premiere episode "Oil", Steven finally confronts his father, criticizing Blake's capitalistic values and seemingly-amoral business practices. Blake explodes, revealing the secret of which Steven thought his father was unaware: Blake is disgusted by Steven's homosexuality, and his refusal to "conform" sets father and son at odds for some time.

To Blake's chagrin, Steven goes to work for Walter Lankershim (Dale Robertson), a small-time oilman and rival to Blake, and his new business partner Matthew Blaisdel (Bo Hopkins), Steven's old friend and Blake's former employee, who had previously been involved with Krystle. Though Walter brings Steven to a brothel in a fatherly attempt to resolve his sexual confusion, he and Matthew are unfazed by Steven's supposed preference for men, and Matthew even defends him against the homophobic glares of other oil rig workers. Steven finds a kindred spirit in Matthew's fragile wife Claudia (Pamela Bellwood), who is trying to put her life back together after a mental breakdown, and they secretly kiss in "The Chauffeur Tells a Secret". Steven is framed for an accident at Walter's oil rig and fired. He is offered his job back when his innocence is later proven, but declines; after beginning an affair with Claudia in "The Necklace", Steven decides to work for Blake at Denver-Carrington. Despite Fallon's machinations to keep him away, Steven's ex-lover Ted Dinard (Mark Withers) appears, hoping to reconcile. Steven spends the night with Ted, soon deciding he must break it off with both Ted and Claudia. As Steven and Ted are saying their final goodbyes in "The Separation", Blake enters to find them in a chaste embrace. Blake, whose discomfort with Steven's sexuality manifests itself in rage, angrily pushes the two men apart. Ted falls backward and hits his head; the injury proves fatal and Blake is arrested and charged with murder. Angry and upset, Steven testifies that Ted's death had been the result of malicious intent, which infuriates Blake and Fallon. A veiled surprise witness for the prosecution appears in the season finale "The Testimony", and Fallon gasps in recognition: "Oh my God, that's my mother!"

==== Season 2 ====
In the second-season premiere "Enter Alexis" (1981), the former Alexis Carrington testifies that ex-husband Blake has a violent temper, which proves damaging to his case. Blake is found guilty of manslaughter for Ted's death but does not serve any jail time. Fallon is cold toward Alexis and Blake is openly hostile; at odds with his father, Steven is drawn to the long-absent mother he hardly remembers. He is seduced by the apparent devotion of Alexis, whom Blake had exiled from Denver and her children's lives after he had discovered her affair with another man. Steven soon gets a taste of his mother's poison in "Alexis' Secret": according to Alexis, Fallon is not Blake's daughter at all, and she later indicates that Fallon's father is in fact Blake's longtime friend and business rival, Cecil Colby (Lloyd Bochner). The secret eating at him, a drunken Steven falls, hits his head, and nearly drowns in the pool. Steven and Blake put aside their differences, and a convalescing Steven meets Krystle's visiting niece Sammy Jo (Heather Locklear) in "Reconciliation" (1981).

When Alexis suggests that, as Blake's only heir, Steven should get married, he considers the idea and approaches Claudia about resuming their relationship. Steven and Sammy Jo begin dating, although he is unable at first to make love to her. Steven proposes to Claudia; still in love with Matthew, she declines, driving Steven back to Sammy Jo. They elope in the 1982 episode "Sammy Jo and Steven Marry". Blake and Alexis do not approve of the match; the marriage is short-lived, however, as Alexis pays Sammy Jo to leave Steven and Denver in "The Baby". Fallon is devastated at the revelation that Blake is not her father, but a blood test proves their biological connection in "The Gun" as Steven follows Sammy Jo to Hollywood. On his way home to Denver in "The Shakedown", Steven meets an attractive male stranger who subsequently tries to blackmail him; Steven beats him up and is arrested. In the April 28, 1982 episode "The Two Princes", Steven confronts the entire family, berating them for their intolerance and elitist values, and stating for all to hear that he is gay and unashamed. Vowing to live his own life on his own terms, he leaves the mansion.

==== Season 3 ====
In the eighth episode of the season, "La Mirage", Fallon finally receives a letter from Steven, who is working on an oil rig in the Java Sea. Jack Coleman debuts as Steven (his face unseen) in the December 1, 1982 episode "Acapulco" as the oil rig explodes. Blake and Alexis rush to Indonesia to search for him, but Steven is presumed dead; Blake refuses to believe it. In "Samantha", Sammy Jo reappears with a baby, who, she claims, is her son by Steven.

Announcing her desire to seek fame as a model in New York City in the January 5, 1983 episode "Danny", Sammy Jo hopes that Blake and Krystle will take baby Danny off her hands. Meanwhile, Steven is alive in a Singapore hospital, his face bandaged after extensive cosmetic surgery. Alexis wants custody of Danny herself but is soon distracted by greedy Adam's machinations. Several episodes later in "The Mirror", Steven's bandages are removed. He considers letting his family continue to believe that he is dead, but Steven's doctor contacts Blake. Blake recognizes his son despite the surgery, but Steven refuses to return to Denver. He reconsiders when Blake tells him about Danny. Steven makes an emotional return to the Carrington mansion in "Fathers and Sons", reuniting with his loved ones and meeting his long-lost brother Adam and infant son Danny for the first time. Alexis admits that she had paid Sammy Jo to leave Denver and suggests that Blake had bribed her to leave Danny behind; Steven visits Sammy Jo in New York in "The Downstairs Bride" but returns alone.

Steven finds himself in the middle of his parents' fight over a potential merger of their companies initiated by a plotting Alexis. Blake is dismayed when Steven accepts a job offer from Alexis and makes known his plan to move out of the mansion with Danny. In the March 30, 1983 episode "The Dinner" Steven visits Claudia, who had returned to the sanitarium after another breakdown during his absence. Tensions between Blake and Steven escalate further thanks to Alexis, who manages to keep Steven away from a dinner planned by Krystle to mend fences between father and son. In the third-season finale "The Cabin", Blake learns that Steven is living with his attorney, Chris Deegan (Grant Goodeve). Suspecting that the men are more than friends, Blake decides to sue Steven for custody of Danny.

==== Season 4 ====
When Steven learns of his father's plans, he and Blake come to blows. Chris represents Steven at the custody trial. Blake argues that a homosexual cannot be a good parent, while Steven argues that Blake, as a convicted murderer, is worse. Alexis testifies that Blake paid off Sammy Jo to leave the baby in Denver; while Sammy Jo testifies that Steven is promiscuous. Claudia, who has recently been released from a sanitarium, tells Steven that she has a plan to win the custody trial. Steven and Claudia fly to Reno and are married. In episode 67, "Tender Comrades", they are awarded custody of Danny. In episode 72, Steven and Blake reconcile, and by episode 74 Steven and Claudia have moved back into the mansion.

Steven is concerned about Claudia's fragile emotional state when she starts receiving flowers (violets), gifts and phone calls from her missing (and presumed dead) husband, Matthew. In their investigation, Steven and Claudia travel to South America and visit the site where Matthew and Lindsay crashed. When Steven finds Dex Dexter with violets at ColbyCo, he suspects that Dex is responsible. Eventually, they learn that the calls and gifts were from Morgan Hess, a private investigator with ties to Alexis. However, it is Sammy Jo who is paying Hess to harass the couple. She returns to Denver and announces that she will fight for custody of Danny.

==== Season 5 ====
Luke (Billy Campbell), Claudia (Pamela Bellwood), and Steven (Jack Coleman), from "Triangles" (1985)

Sammy Jo kidnaps Danny and demands $30,000/month for his return. However, Blake convinces Adam to help get Danny back, and Sammy Jo returns to New York, defeated.

Meanwhile, Steven is distressed by his mother's arrest for the murder of Mark Jennings, Krystle's ex-husband. After an anonymous tip to the DA, Steven is called as a witness where he testifies that he saw his mother push Mark off her balcony. Alexis is furious and disowns Steven. Her lover, Dex, discovers that disgraced former Congressman Neal McVane, disguised as Alexis, is the real killer. After her acquittal, Steven and his mother reconcile when she realizes it was a case of mistaken identity and he returns to work at ColbyCo.

In episode 91, Steven and his family learn that Fallon has been killed in a plane crash with her lover, Peter DeVilbis. In episode 96, Steven learns that he has another sister, Amanda, born after his parents divorced and raised by Alexis' cousin. Although Alexis denies it at first, eventually she admits that Amanda is Blake's daughter.

At work, Steven meets a gay co-worker named Luke Fuller. Although Luke is attracted to Steven, their relationship is platonic at first. Claudia, however, is troubled by the growing friendship between the two men and eventually has an extramarital affair with Dean Caldwell. When Steven learns of the affair, he sleeps with Luke. In episode 105, "Triangles", Steven decides to end the affair and reconcile with Claudia. However, by episode 110 Steven tells Claudia that while he loves her, he also loves Luke. Claudia, prompted by Adam, flies to Mexico to divorce Steven in episode 112. Steven's affair with Luke strains his relationship with Blake, especially when Steven invites Luke to be his escort to Amanda's wedding to Prince Michael of Moldavia.

==== Season 6 ====
Steven is heartbroken when Luke is killed in the terrorist attack at Amanda's wedding. After returning to Denver, he grows closer to Sammy Jo who has reconciled with Krystle. Steven is also needed to help Blake, who is having serious health problems. In episode 132, a frightened Sammy Jo confesses to Steven that she's been involved with a plot to kidnap Krystle and replace her with a look-alike. She has learned that her co-conspirators have been poisoning Blake. Steven saves his father from faux-Krystle while Sammy Jo frees Krystle from her captors.

After Blake recovers he announces plans to put Steven on his board of directors. As part of his job, Steven must work with state senator Bart Fallmont who does not agree with Denver-Carrington's business plans. While working together, Bart and Steven develop a romantic interest in each other but decide not to pursue it as Bart has not come out as a homosexual. Adam, with Denver-Carrington's interests in mind, leaks to the press that Bart is a closeted gay man. Amid the scandal, Bart is removed from the state senate. Bart accuses Steven of betraying him for Denver-Carrington, but Steven knows the true culprit is Adam. Meanwhile, Sammy Jo and Clay, Bart's brother, are engaged. In episode 146, Steven worries that Sammy Jo may fight for custody again.

==== Season 7 ====
In episode 155, Sammy Jo taunts Steven with threats of a custody battle. In episode 157, Steven is distressed to learn that Danny is demonstrating troubling behavior at school. Sammy Jo continues to threaten Steven, but by episode 163 her quickie marriage to Clay Fallmont is in trouble and two episodes later it is annulled. Sammy Jo and Steven agree to put aside their differences for Danny's benefit, and in episode 166 agree to live together platonically in an attempt to give Danny a normal home life. In episode 171, however, they give in to romantic feelings and make love. Steven, once again, is conflicted over his emotions and sexuality. In episode 172, a frustrated Steven goes recklessly horseback riding and is injured when he is thrown from his horse. He decides to move out of Sammy Jo's ranch and leaves Danny with his mother. He announces that he will leave Denver after Adam's wedding. Unfortunately, a not-so-dead Matthew Blaisdel and his native South American henchmen crash the wedding and take the family hostage.

==== Season 8 ====
After several days in captivity, Steven manages to overpower Matthew and stabs him to death in the second episode of the season, "The Siege – Part 2". The incident leaves him emotionally scarred and he is encouraged to seek psychiatric help. Deciding to remain in Denver, he takes over Blake's football team; when Sammy Jo becomes romantically involved with quarterback Josh Harris, Steven is outraged. He orders a medical screening when Josh's playing becomes erratic, and Josh, a cocaine addict, quits the team. Josh proposes to Sammy Jo, and when she refuses he overdoses and dies. Blake, who has been impressed with Steven's handling of the football team, asks him to run Denver-Carrington while Blake campaigns for governor. Steven's management style causes great conflict between him, Adam, Fallon, and Dex; Steven also confronts Jeff, telling him to stay out of Sammy Jo's life. However, Steven bands together with his family when they learn that Alexis' new husband, Sean Rowan, is plotting to destroy the Carringtons. Struggling with the uncertainty in his life, Steven decides that he needs to leave Denver and regroup. In the March 30, 1988 season cliffhanger "Colorado Roulette", Steven pens a letter to Blake explaining his need for distance and leaves Denver. Adam subsequently burns the letter before Blake finds or reads it.

==== The Reunion ====
By the time of the 1991 miniseries Dynasty: The Reunion, Steven is an environmental lobbyist in Washington, D.C. and is in a long-term relationship with Bart Fallmont, who returned to Denver during the three years between the series finale and the miniseries. Steven and Blake finally reconcile when Blake formally accepts Steven's and Bart's committed relationship.

== Reboot ==
Steven Carrington
- Dynasty character
- James Mackay as Steven in the 2017 reboot series
- Portrayed by: James Mackay; Dan Amboyer (2022)
- Duration: 2017–2019, 2022
- First appearance: "I Hardly Recognized You"; October 11, 2017
- Last appearance: "Catch 22"; September 16, 2022
- Created by: Richard and Esther Shapiro; Sallie Patrick
In-universe information
- Other names: Graham
- Occupation: Head of the Carrington Foundation; Politician
- Father: Joseph Anders
- Mother: Alexis Carrington Colby
- Stepfather: Blake Carrington; Jeff Colby; Dex Dexter
- Stepmother: Celia Machado a.k.a. Cristal Flores; Cristal Jennings
- Half-brothers: Adam Carrington
- Half-sisters: Fallon Carrington; Kirby Anders; Amanda Carrington
- Spouse: Sam Jones (2018–2019)
- Grandparents: Thomas Carrington; Evelyn Carrington
- Aunts and uncles: Dominique Deveraux; Ben Carrington
- Nieces: Lauren Carrington-Ridley
- First cousins: Jeff Colby; Monica Colby; Juliette Carrington; Unnamed cousin (via Ben)

A pilot for a Dynasty reboot for The CW was announced in September 2016, and James Mackay was cast as Steven. The new series premiered on October 11, 2017.

=== Characterization ===
Executive producer Josh Schwartz said that in the new series, "The relationship between Blake and Steven is not about [Steven's] sexuality. Steven is confidently gay, and Blake accepts him." Their conflict is instead focused on the environmental issues surrounding Blake's energy conglomerate. Executive producer Sallie Patrick said, "I wasn't interested in telling a story about a father who is not on board with his son being gay. That's not to say [Blake] was always OK with it—there might have been a moment where he struggled with it, maybe that's the back story. We'll see. I also just wanted Steven to be more confident about who he is. For us, it was much more interesting to me that their conflict had more to do with their opposing political viewpoints." According to Patrick, "We were interested in the character as a role model of self-acceptance and pride, and whose conflict with his father wasn't about being gay, but more about being liberal—and how they led to their falling out." Maureen Ryan of Variety noted that "like Fallon, [Steven] gets a few chances to express his exasperation with their father's manipulative ways ... Steven is less ambitious than his sister, but like her, he is pulled back into Blake's orbit". Vulture's Matt Zoller Seitz wrote, "[Steven's] conflicted attitude toward his own privilege frequently shades over into self-criticism. He knows all of this luxury has warped his mind, but he can't give it up ... he learns that somebody stole a wad of $100 bills from his pants pocket [and] admits he never noticed the theft. Only a person who has never had to worry about money could be so cavalier about losing it."

The series also changed Sammy Jo from a woman to a gay man named Sam "Sammy Jo" Jones, played by Rafael de la Fuente. Executive producer Stephanie Savage said, "With Steven Carrington out and proud, it makes sense for Sammy Jo to be a man." Patrick added, "It felt right to make him [Steven's] soulmate." She said, "I love how Steven's arc and ability to forgive Sammy Jo contrasts with Blake's inability to forgive Fallon, dramatizing how Steven continues to be quite different from his father".

=== Departure ===
On November 9, 2018, James Mackay announced via Instagram that he has departed from the series. "While Steven had a choice to leave, unfortunately I didn't," Mackay explains. "There's a lot of decisions involved in making television, and sometimes they just don't go your way and you have to live with it." Deadline Hollywood reported that Mackay would return later in the season in a surprising plot twist. Mackay subsequently appeared in three additional episodes of the second season, with Steven's storyline left on a cliffhanger at the end of the fourteenth episode and the fate of the character unclear.

Steven's absence from the later seasons and the lack of an in-universe explanation served as one of the most notable criticisms for Dynasty as a whole, with his sibling dynamic with Fallon, the family's obliviousness to Adam orchestrating Steven's mental breakdown, and the show's tendency to recast other roles, being sources of frustration and confusion amongst fans regarding the character's abrupt departure. In December 2021, Mackay took to Instagram to express his appreciation for the fans' continued support of him and his role on Dynasty, while also noting that his departure was not his or creator and executive producer Sallie Patrick's choice. In addition, several cast members, including Elizabeth Gillies and Grant Show, have vocalized their disagreement with The CW's decision to fire Mackay from the series. "It was pitched to me as [Fallon's] most important relationship," Gillies explains, "and then they got rid of him out of absolutely nowhere, and he'd done nothing wrong."

On September 16, 2022, Mackay ultimately reprised his role as Steven Carrington in the series finale. According to executive producer Josh Reims, Steven's return was only due to the fact that Dynasty was ending. "This was just a series finale thing," Reims explains, "We had discussed at the beginning of the season bringing Steven back, whether it was going to be James or someone else was always up in the air, depending on whether we could get him and have it all work out. Once we knew it was the series finale, we felt like it was only right to try and get James to come back and make everybody happy and whole again." Additionally, Reims admitted that writers did not discuss bringing Steven back often, due to their focus on telling as many stories as they could with the 12 to 13 series regulars they currently had. However, "The writers' room always felt that Adam would need to pay for what he did to Steven, and it would be great if Steven was the one to make him pay. It was always in the back of our minds."

=== Storylines ===
In the premiere episode "I Hardly Recognized You", Steven returns to Atlanta to find his father Blake Carrington engaged to Cristal, a woman instantly loathed by Steven's sister Fallon. Though close to Fallon, Steven finds himself befriending an earnest Cristal, and warming up to his father. Steven has a one-night stand with Sam Jones, who he later discovers is Cristal's nephew. Steven tries to uncomplicate matters by keeping his distance from Sam, who is staying at the mansion, but is won over by Sam's compulsive honesty and thoughtfulness. Steven is implicated in the death of Matthew Blaidsel, and again clashes with Blake, who he suspects may have been involved. In "Private as a Circus", Steven works with Sam to retrieve Matthew's phone, which Blake had obtained illegally and was subsequently stolen. Steven channels his father as he coerces Chief Stansfield into clearing him for Matthew's death, but is uncomfortable with the apparent suicide and confession that exonerate him. Soon, Steven is furious when a repentant Sam admits his complicity in the robbery.

=== Reception ===
Maureen Ryan of Variety called Mackay "suitably droll and engaging", and Matt Zoller Seitz of Vulture deemed Steven "the best character so far".
