= Right & Wrong =

Book by Hugh Mackay

Right & Wrong: How to Decide for Yourself
- Author: Hugh Mackay
- Language: English
- Published: 2004; 2005
- Publisher: Hodder
- Publication place: Australia
- ISBN: 978-0-7336-1939-7

Right & Wrong: How to Decide for Yourself is a book on ethics by Hugh Mackay published in 2004 and again with an updated edition in 2005.
