= Hugh Mackay (social researcher) =

Australian psychologist and writer

Hugh Mackay AO FRSN
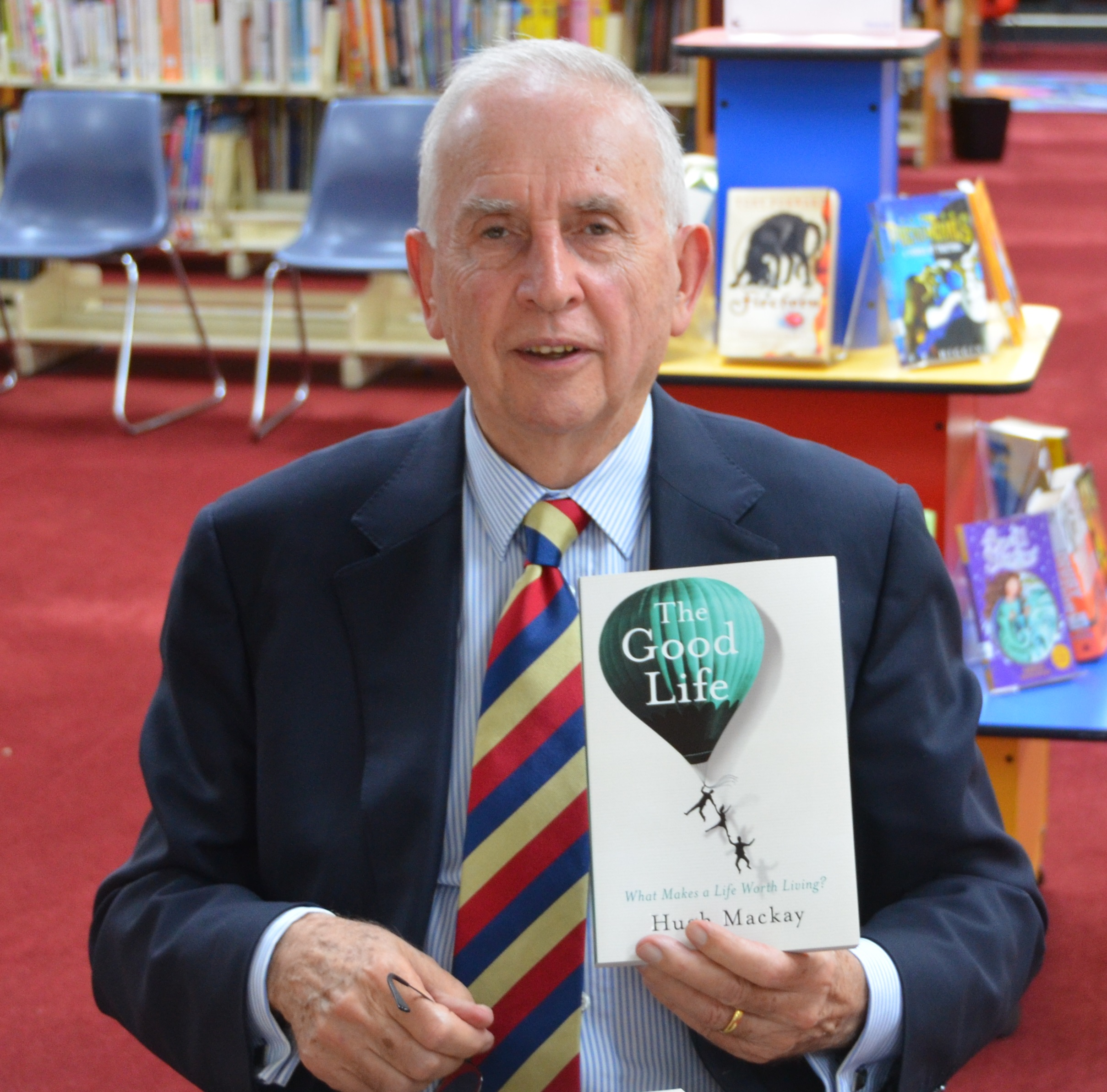
- Mackay in 2013
- Born: Hugh Clifford Mackay; 31 March 1938 (age 88)
- Education: University of Sydney; Macquarie University
- Occupations: Psychologist; social researcher; writer
- Known for: The Mackay Report
- Children: James Mackay

Hugh Clifford Mackay (born 31 March 1938) is an Australian psychologist, social researcher and writer, who founded the Australian quarterly research series The Mackay Report 1979–2003, which later became The Ipsos Mackay Report. He was a weekly newspaper columnist for 25 years and is a regularly appearing commentator on radio and television.

== Career ==
He is a graduate of Sydney Grammar School, and holds a Bachelor of Arts from the University of Sydney and a Master of Arts from Macquarie University. He was a founding member of The Australian Psychological Society and is one of the founders of The Ethics Centre (formerly known as The St James Ethics Centre).

Mackay has held a number of honorary academic positions, including adjunct professor in the Faculty of Arts of Charles Sturt University, Professor of Social Science at the University of Wollongong and professorial fellow in the Macquarie Graduate School of Management.

He is a patron of the Asylum Seekers Centre and was previously a member of the Bell Shakespeare Artistic Advisory Panel. He was the inaugural chairman of the ACT Government's Community Inclusion Board, chairman of trustees of Sydney Grammar School and deputy chairman of the Australia Council. He has also served on committees of the Law Society of New South Wales, the Sydney Peace Prize, and the National Heart Foundation of Australia.. After an in air incident on a flight from Sydney to Brisbane Hugh didn’t fly for 15 years despite his busy nationwide work commitments over that time.

Mackay is a Fellow of the Australian Psychological Society and the Royal Society of NSW, and an Associate Fellow of the British Psychological Society.

== Honours and awards ==
He holds honorary doctorates in Letters from Charles Sturt University, Macquarie University, the University of New South Wales the University of Western Sydney and the University of Wollongong as well as the Hartnett Medal from the Royal Society of Arts, and the Alumni Award for Community Service from the University of Sydney.

At the 2015 Australia Day Honours, Mackay was appointed an Officer of the Order of Australia for distinguished service to the community in the areas of social research and psychology, as an author and commentator, and through roles with visual and performing arts and educational organisations.

== Publications ==
=== Non-fiction ===
- The Centre for Communication Studies; Jones, Caroline; Mackay, Hugh (1983), Better communication: an educational program based on five audio cassette tapes; program workbook, Centre for Communication Studies
- Mackay, Hugh (1993), Reinventing Australia : the mind and mood of Australia in the 90s (Updated ed.), Angus & Robertson, ISBN 978-0-207-18314-0 drew on 60 individual reports
- Mackay, Hugh (1998), Why Don't People Listen? : solving the communication problem, Pan Macmillan (published 1994), ISBN 978-0-7329-0931-4 (subsequently re-published as 'The Good Listener'. 1998)
- Mackay, Hugh (1997), Generations (1st ed.), Pan Macmillan, ISBN 978-0-7329-0921-5
- Mackay, Hugh (1999), Turning point : Australians choosing their future, Pan Macmillan, ISBN 978-0-7329-1001-3
- Mackay, Hugh (2002), Media Mania: Why Our Fear of Modern Media is Misplaced, UNSW Press, ISBN 0-86840-709-7
- Mackay, Hugh (2005), Right & wrong : how to decide for yourself (Updated ed.), Hodder Headline Australia (published 2004), ISBN 978-0-7336-1939-7 (2nd edition published 2019).
- Mackay, Hugh (2008), Advance Australia ... where? (Updated ed.), Hachette Livre Australia, ISBN 978-0-7336-2362-2
- Mackay, Hugh (2013), What makes us tick? : the ten desires that drive us (New ed.), Hachette Australia (published 2010), ISBN 978-0-7336-2999-0 (2nd edition published 2019)
- Mackay, Hugh (2013), The Good Life : What makes a life worth living? (New ed.), Pan Macmillan, ISBN 978-1-7426-1213-3 (originally published 2013)
- Mackay, Hugh (2014), The art of belonging, Pan Macmillan, ISBN 978-1-74261-425-0
- Mackay, Hugh (26 April 2016), Beyond belief : How we find meaning, with or without religion, Sydney, N.S.W. Pan Macmillan (published 2016), ISBN 978-1-925479-21-8
- Mackay, Hugh (24 April 2018), Australia Reimagined : Towards a more compassionate, less anxious society, Pan Macmillan Australia (published 2018), ISBN 978-1-74353-482-3
- Mackay, Hugh (11 August 2020), The Inner Self: The joy of discovering who we really are, Pan Macmillan Australia (published 2020), ISBN 978-1760787745
- Mackay, Hugh (4 May 2021), The Kindness Revolution: How we can restore hope, rebuild trust and inspire optimism, Allen & Unwin (published 2021), ISBN 978-1760879938
- Mackay, Hugh (30 April 2024), The Way We Are: Lessons from a lifetime of listening, Allen & Unwin (published 2024), ISBN 978-1761470059

=== Periodical ===
- The Mackay Report quarterly research series (subsequently The Ipsos Mackay Report), over 100 reports including:
  - Mackay, Hugh (1985), The Mackay report : the multiculture, Mackay Research
  - Mackay, Hugh (1988), The Mackay report : teenagers (& their parents), Mackay Research, ISBN 978-0-949760-45-6
  - Mackay, Hugh; IPSOS Australia Pty Ltd (2005), The IPSOS Mackay report : Whither the boomers?, IPSOS Australia

=== Fiction ===
- Mackay, Hugh (1996), Little lies, Pan Macmillan Australia, ISBN 978-0-330-35735-7
- Mackay, Hugh (1997), Houseguest, Picador, ISBN 978-0-330-36000-5
- Mackay, Hugh (1999), The spin : two candidates-- one winner, Pan Macmillan Australia, ISBN 978-0-330-36143-9
- Mackay, Hugh (2002), Winter close, Hodder, ISBN 978-0-7336-1548-1
- Mackay, Hugh (2009), Ways of escape, Hachette Australia, ISBN 978-0-7336-2347-9
- Mackay, Hugh (2013), Infidelity : a novel, Pan Macmillan Australia, ISBN 978-1-74261-248-5
- Mackay, Hugh (2017), Selling the dream : a novel, Pan Macmillan Australia Pty Ltd, ISBN 978-1-74353-486-1
- Mackay, Hugh (2023), The Therapist, Allen & Unwin, ISBN 978-1761068355
