= Dynasty (2017 TV series) =

American television soap opera

- Genre: Drama
- Based on: Dynasty by Richard and Esther Shapiro
- Developed by: Sallie Patrick; Josh Schwartz; Stephanie Savage
- Starring: Elizabeth Gillies; Nathalie Kelley; James Mackay; Robert Christopher Riley; Sam Adegoke; Rafael de la Fuente; Alan Dale; Grant Show; Nicollette Sheridan; Ana Brenda Contreras; Maddison Brown; Sam Underwood; Daniella Alonso; Michael Michele; Adam Huber; Elaine Hendrix; Eliza Bennett
- Theme music composer: Bill Conti; Paul Leonard-Morgan; William Popper
- Composer: Paul Leonard-Morgan
- Country of origin: United States
- Original language: English
- No. of seasons: 5
- No. of episodes: 108 (list of episodes)

Production
- Executive producers: Richard Shapiro; Esther Shapiro; Stephanie Savage; Josh Schwartz; Brad Silberling; Sallie Patrick; Christopher Fife; Josh Reims
- Producers: Jeffrey Downer; Jenna Richman; Kevin A. Garnett
- Production location: Atlanta, Georgia
- Cinematography: Xavier Grobet
- Editors: Brandi Bradburn; Adrienne McNally; Brandon Lott; J.J. Geiger; Jennifer Hatton; Ben Northenor
- Camera setup: Single-camera
- Running time: 40–43 minutes
- Production companies: Fake Empire; Richard and Esther Shapiro Productions; Rabbit Ears, Inc.; CBS Studios

Original release
- Network: The CW
- Release: October 11, 2017 – September 16, 2022

Dynasty is an American drama television series reboot based on the 1980s soap opera. Developed by Josh Schwartz, Stephanie Savage, and Sallie Patrick, the first season stars Elizabeth Gillies as glamorous businesswoman Fallon Carrington, Grant Show as her billionaire father Blake, James Mackay as her brother Steven, and Nathalie Kelley as Blake's new wife Cristal, with Robert Christopher Riley as chauffeur Michael Culhane, Sam Adegoke as tech billionaire Jeff Colby, Rafael de la Fuente as Cristal's nephew Sam "Sammy Jo" Jones, and Alan Dale as Joseph Anders, the cunning majordomo.

The series later featured Nicollette Sheridan (later Elaine Hendrix) as Blake's first wife Alexis; Maddison Brown as Joseph's daughter, Kirby Anders; Ana Brenda Contreras (later Daniella Alonso) as Blake's third wife, Cristal; Sam Underwood as eldest Carrington son Adam; Michael Michele as Blake's half-sister Dominique Deveraux; Adam Huber as writer Liam Ridley; and Eliza Bennett as the youngest Carrington sibling, Amanda.

The pilot, which was announced in September 2016, was ordered to series in May 2017. Dynasty premiered on October 11, 2017, on The CW in the United States, and on Netflix internationally a day later. On November 8, 2017, The CW picked up Dynasty for a full season of 22 episodes. On February 3, 2021, the series was renewed for a fifth season, which premiered on December 20 of the same year. In May 2022, it was announced that this season would be the last. The final episode aired on September 16, 2022.

== Premise ==
Fallon and Steven Carrington learn that their billionaire father Blake is engaged to Cristal, an employee at the family company, Carrington Atlantic. When Fallon's machinations to separate the couple backfire and cost her a promotion, she allies with Blake's nemesis and former employee, Jeff Colby, and strikes out on her own. Cristal's opportunistic nephew, Sam, threatens to expose her shady past as the fractured dynasty forms a united front in the wake of engineer Matthew Blaisdel's suspicious death. Things do not remain harmonious. Season after season, more relatives appear in Atlanta, including Fallon and Steven's long absent mother, Alexis; their twisted older brother Adam; secret Carrington offspring Amanda; and Dominique, the illegitimate daughter of Blake's father, Thomas.

The reboot updates several elements from the 1980s original, including moving the setting from Denver, Colorado to Atlanta, Georgia; shifting the lead to young businesswoman Fallon; making Steven's homosexuality a nonissue to Blake; and changing gold digger Sammy Jo to a gay man. Additionally, Blake's new wife and her nephew are Latin American, and chauffeur Michael Culhane and the Colby family are African-American.

== Episodes ==
Season	Episodes	Originally released		Rank	Average viewers (in millions inc. DVR)
Season	Episodes	First released	Last released	Rank	Average viewers (in millions inc. DVR)
1	22	October 11, 2017	May 11, 2018	145	1.00
2	22	October 12, 2018	May 24, 2019	141	0.80
3	20	October 11, 2019	May 8, 2020	133	0.59
4	22	May 7, 2021	October 1, 2021	161	0.40
5	22	December 20, 2021	September 16, 2022	140	0.39

== Cast and characters ==
=== Main ===
- Elizabeth Gillies as Fallon Carrington, an heiress and businesswoman, daughter of Blake Carrington and his first wife, Alexis, married to Liam Ridley
  - Gillies also briefly portrays Alexis Carrington in season 2.
- Nathalie Kelley as Celia Machado / Cristal Flores Carrington (season 1), Fallon's new stepmother, a woman with a shady past
- James Mackay as Steven Carrington (seasons 1–2; guest season 5), Fallon's gay environmentalist brother
- Robert Christopher Riley as Michael Culhane, former Carrington chauffeur and Fallon's on again-off again lover, who eventually amasses a fortune
- Sam Adegoke as Jeff Colby, business rival to Blake, CEO of ColbyCo
- Rafael de la Fuente as Samuel Josiah "Sammy Jo" Jones, Celia's wayward nephew and Steven's ex-husband, later hotelier of La Mirage
- Alan Dale as Joseph Anders (seasons 1–4), the Carrington majordomo, Kirby and Steven's biological father
- Grant Show as Blake Carrington, billionaire CEO of Carrington Atlantic, father of Adam, Fallon and Amanda by his first wife, Alexis
- Nicollette Sheridan (recurring season 1, main season 2) and Elaine Hendrix (seasons 3–5), as Alexis Carrington Colby Dexter, both Blake and Jeff's scheming ex, Dex's wife, and mother of Adam, Steven, Fallon and Amanda
- Ana Brenda Contreras (season 2) and Daniella Alonso (seasons 3–5) as Cristal Jennings Carrington, Blake's third wife, a physical therapist from a Mexican crime family who had let Celia use her identity
  - Alonso also portrays Cristal's scheming look-alike, Rita, in season 5.
- Maddison Brown as Kirby Anders (seasons 2–5), Joseph's recovering addict daughter, La Mirage's event coordinator, then a model
- Sam Underwood as Adam Carrington / Dr. Mike Harrison (seasons 2–5), Blake and Alexis's eldest son, a doctor who was kidnapped as an infant
- Adam Huber as Liam Ridley (recurring seasons 1–2, main seasons 3–5), a writer who marries Fallon twice
- Michael Michele as Dominique Deveraux (guest season 2, main seasons 3–5), Blake's discontent half-sister, Jeff and Monica's mother
- Eliza Bennett as Amanda Carrington (recurring season 4, main season 5), Alexis's secret daughter by Blake, a lawyer raised in the UK and Kirby's love interest

=== Recurring ===
==== Introduced in season one ====
- Nick Wechsler as Matthew Blaisdel (season 1), Celia's former lover, a field engineer who dies in a suspicious explosion
- Brianna Brown as Claudia Blaisdel (seasons 1–2; guest season 5), Matthew's unstable wife, a former engineer
- Wakeema Hollis as Monica Colby (seasons 1–3; guest season 4), Jeff's sister, Fallon's closest friend
- Elena Tovar as Iris Machado (season 1; guest season 5), Celia's sister and Sam's mother
- Michael Patrick Lane as Ted Dinard (season 1), Steven's addict ex-boyfriend
- Arnetia Walker as Louella Culhane (seasons 1–2, 5), Michael's mother
- Luis Fernández as Alejandro Raya (season 1), Sam's father who is operating under the alias of Diego Calastana
- Hakeem Kae-Kazim as Cesil Colby (seasons 1–2), Jeff and Monica's incarcerated father
- Kelly Rutherford as Melissa Daniels (seasons 1–3), wife of Senator Paul Daniels, and Steven's former lover
- Elizabeth Youman as Evie Culhane (seasons 1–2), Michael's tech savvy younger sister
- Natalie Karp as Mrs. Gunnerson, the Carringtons' cook (guest seasons 1–3, 5)
- Brent Antonello as Hank Sullivan (seasons 1–2), Alexis's lover who poses as her and Blake's kidnapped firstborn, Adam

==== Introduced in season two ====
- Sharon Lawrence as Laura Van Kirk (season 2–5), Liam's controlling, manipulative mother
- Katherine LaNasa as Ada Stone (season 2), an antiquities dealer who blackmails Michael and Jeff
- Taylor Black as Ashley Cunningham (seasons 2–3), Liam's fiancée and Fallon's romantic rival
- Chase Anderson as Tony (seasons 2–3), the Carringtons' dimwitted gardener
- Geovanni Gopradi as Roberto "Beto" Flores, Cristal's brother, an enforcer for the Flores cartel (season 5; guest seasons 2–4)
- Nicole Zyana as Allison, Fallon's assistant (seasons 2–3)

==== Introduced in season three ====
- Ken Kirby as Evan Tate (season 3; guest season 4), the older brother of Fallon's childhood friend Trixie
- Kelli Barrett as Nadia (season 3), an orientation and mobility instructor hired by Fallon to seduce Adam
- Jade Payton as Vanessa Deveraux (season 3), Dominique's stepdaughter, an aspiring singer
- Daniel Di Tomasso as Fletcher Myers (seasons 3–4), a public relations consultant who becomes Sam's love interest
- Emily Rudd as Heidi (season 3), Liam's former girlfriend, mother of Connor
- John Jackson Hunter as Connor (season 3), Liam's young half-brother who he initially believes is his son
- Wil Traval as Father Caleb Collins (season 3–4), Cristal's lover
- Shannon Thornton as Mia (seasons 3–4), an event planner who is romantically entangled with both Jeff and Michael
- Lachlan Buchanan as Ryan (season 4; guest seasons 3 and 5), a stripper Sam marries briefly, and then dates

==== Introduced in season four ====
- Ashley Day as Colin McNaughton (season 4), Fallon's former enemy and business associate with whom she has an affair
- Luke Cook as Oliver Noble (season 4), Kirby's Australian ex-boyfriend, a fashion photographer
- David Aron Damane as Leo Abbott (season 4), a shady contractor
- Kara Royster as Eva (season 4; guest season 5), Fallon's assistant and protégé who is obsessed with Liam
- Grace Junot as Ellen (season 5, guest season 4), a board member at Fallon Unlimited
- Randy J. Goodwin as Brady Lloyd (season 4; guest season 5), Dominique's grifting ex-husband

==== Introduced in season five ====
- Felisha Terrell as Nina Fournier (season 5), an independent filmmaker and Culhane's love interest
- Pej Vahdat as Dex Dexter (season 5), Alexis's third husband, a hedge fund manager
- Rogelio T. Ramos as Daniel Ruiz (season 5), a horse trainer who is Sam's biological father
- Cynthia Quiles as Charlie Jiménez (season 5), Kirby's modeling agent
- Brett Tucker as Ben Carrington (season 5), Blake's disinherited brother, an art broker
- Samantha Massell as Stacey Moore (season 5), a paleontologist who is Fallon and Liam's surrogate

== Production ==
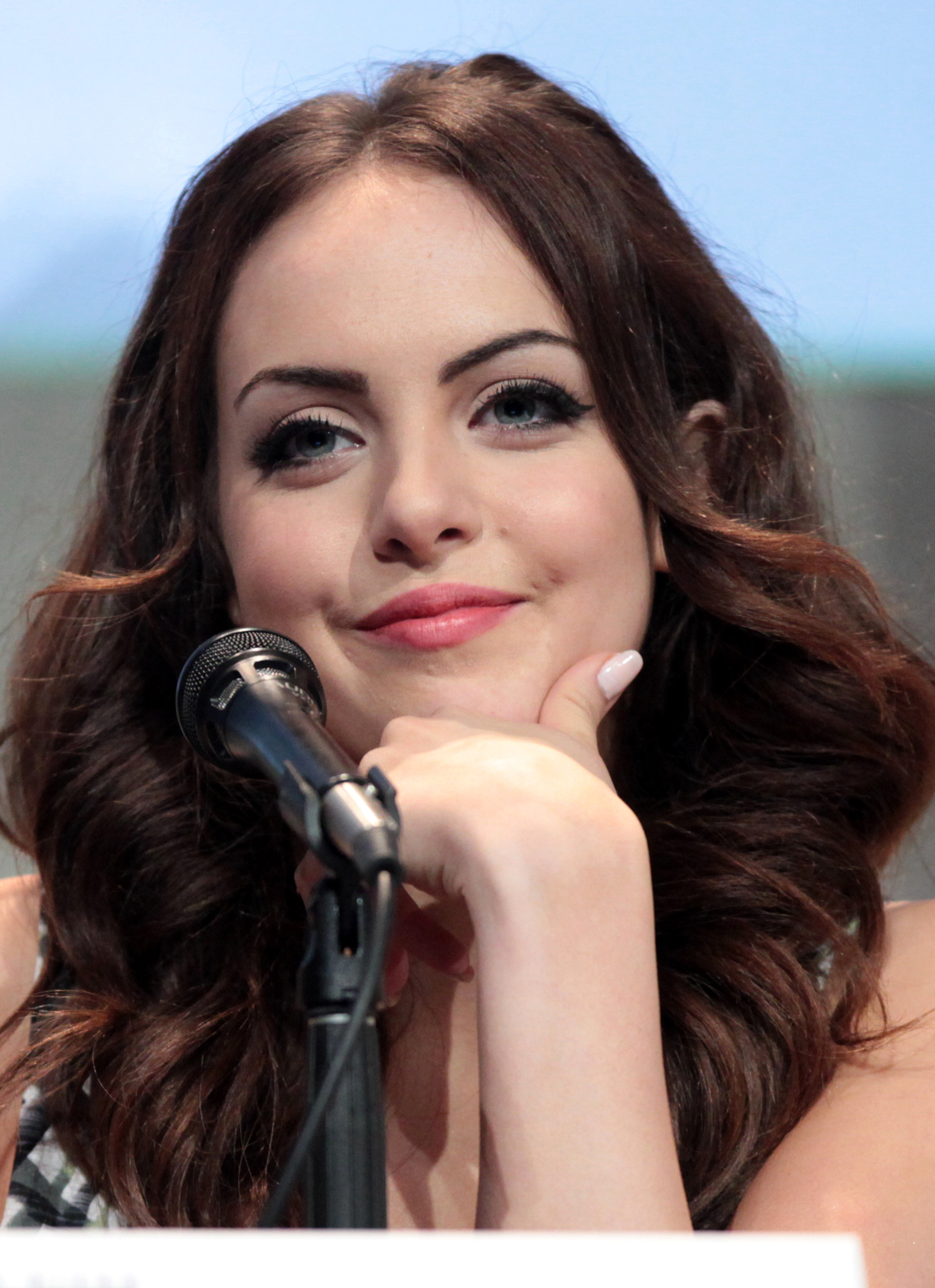
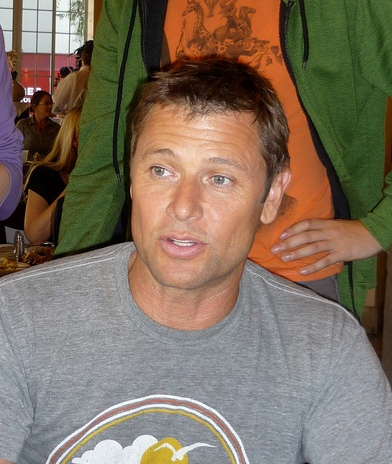
Elizabeth Gillies (left) and Grant Show (right) star as Fallon and Blake Carrington.
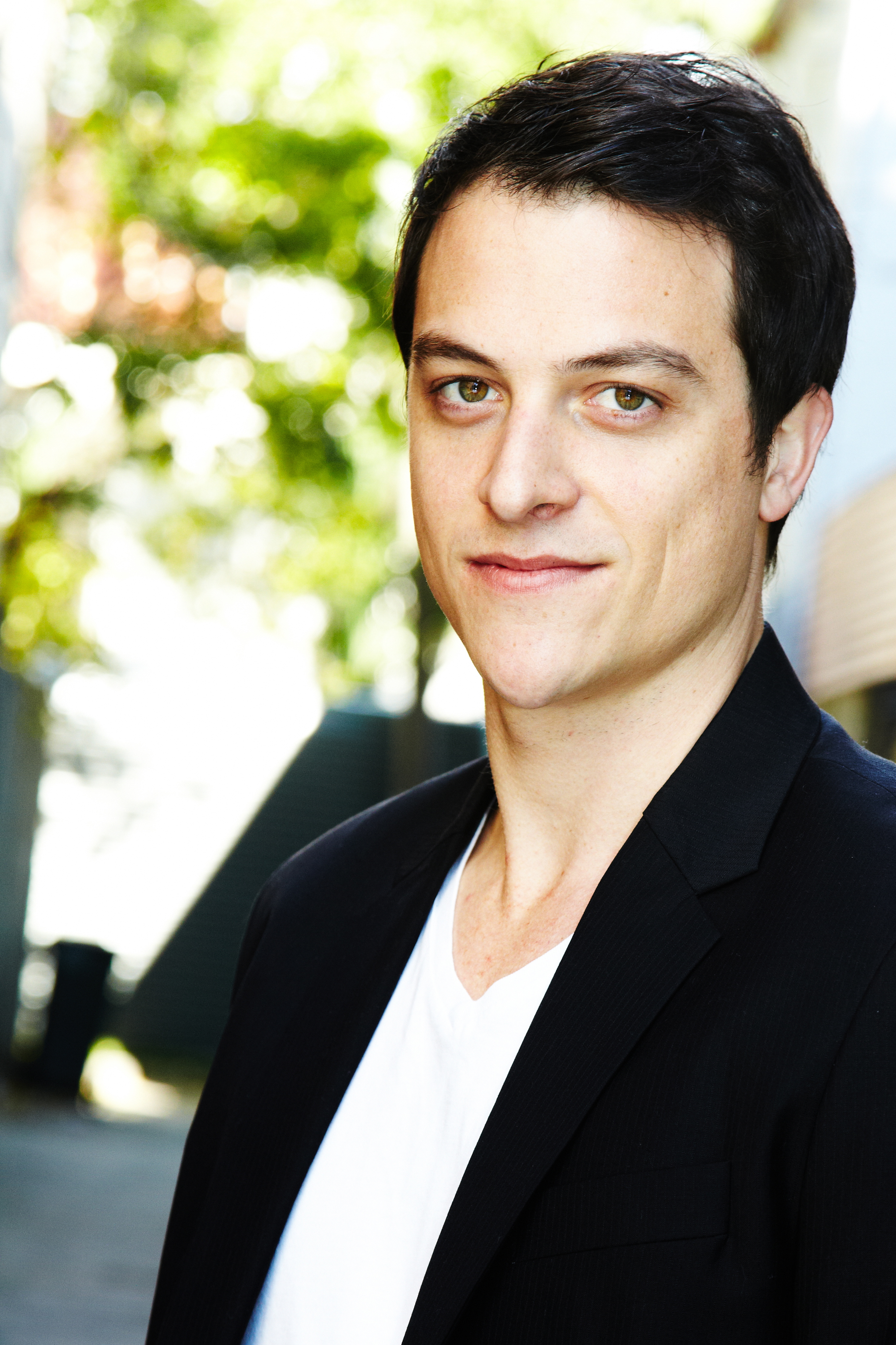
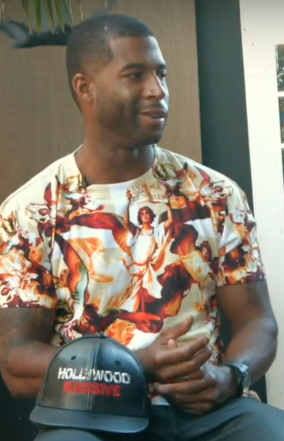
James Mackay (left) and Robert Christopher Riley (right) star as Steven Carrington and Michael Culhane.
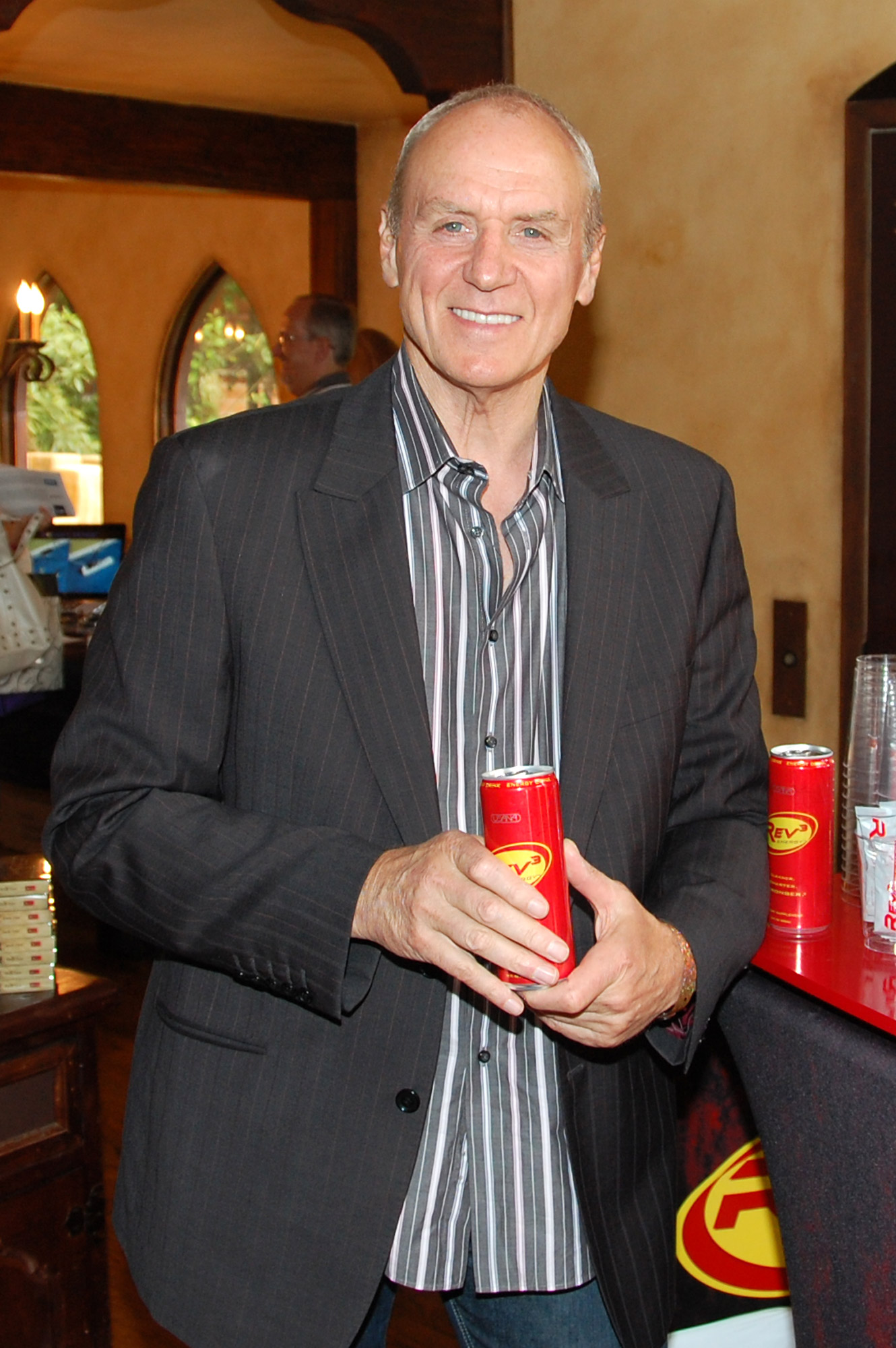
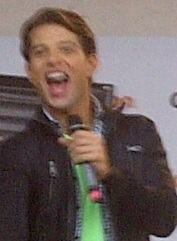
Alan Dale (left) and Rafael de la Fuente (right) star as Joseph Anders and Sam Jones.
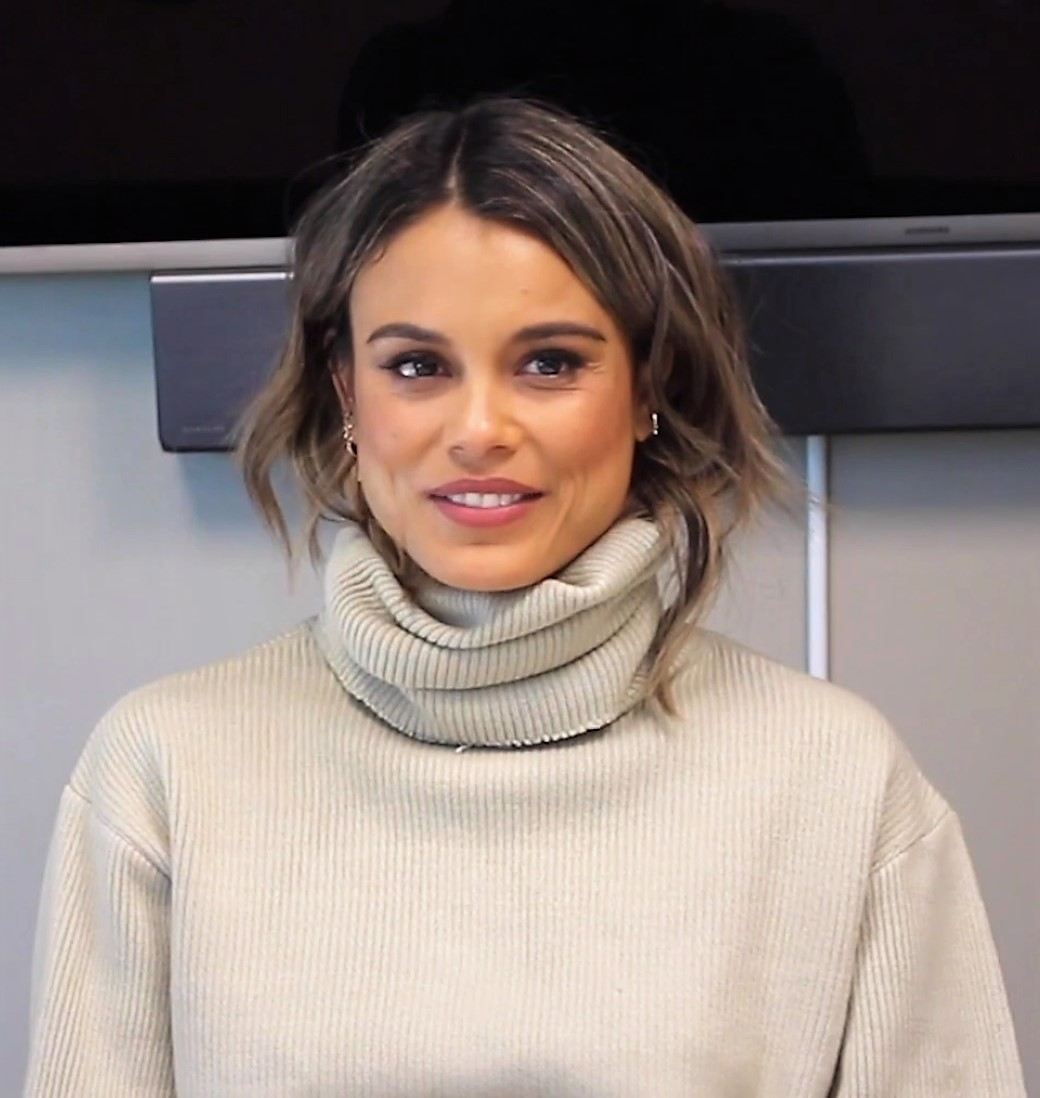
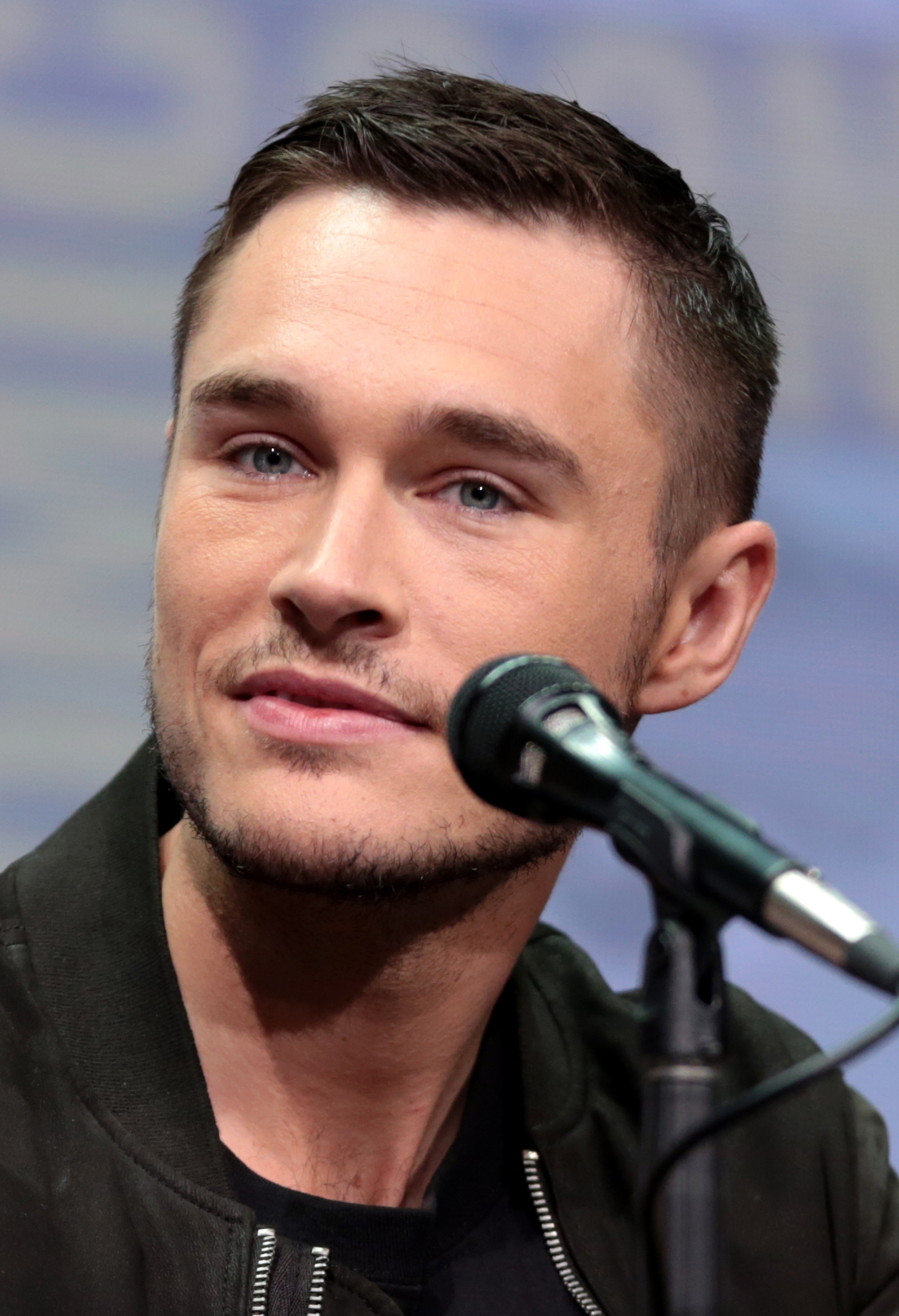
Nathalie Kelley (left) stars as Cristal Flores Carrington in season one, and Sam Underwood joins the series as Adam Carrington in season two.
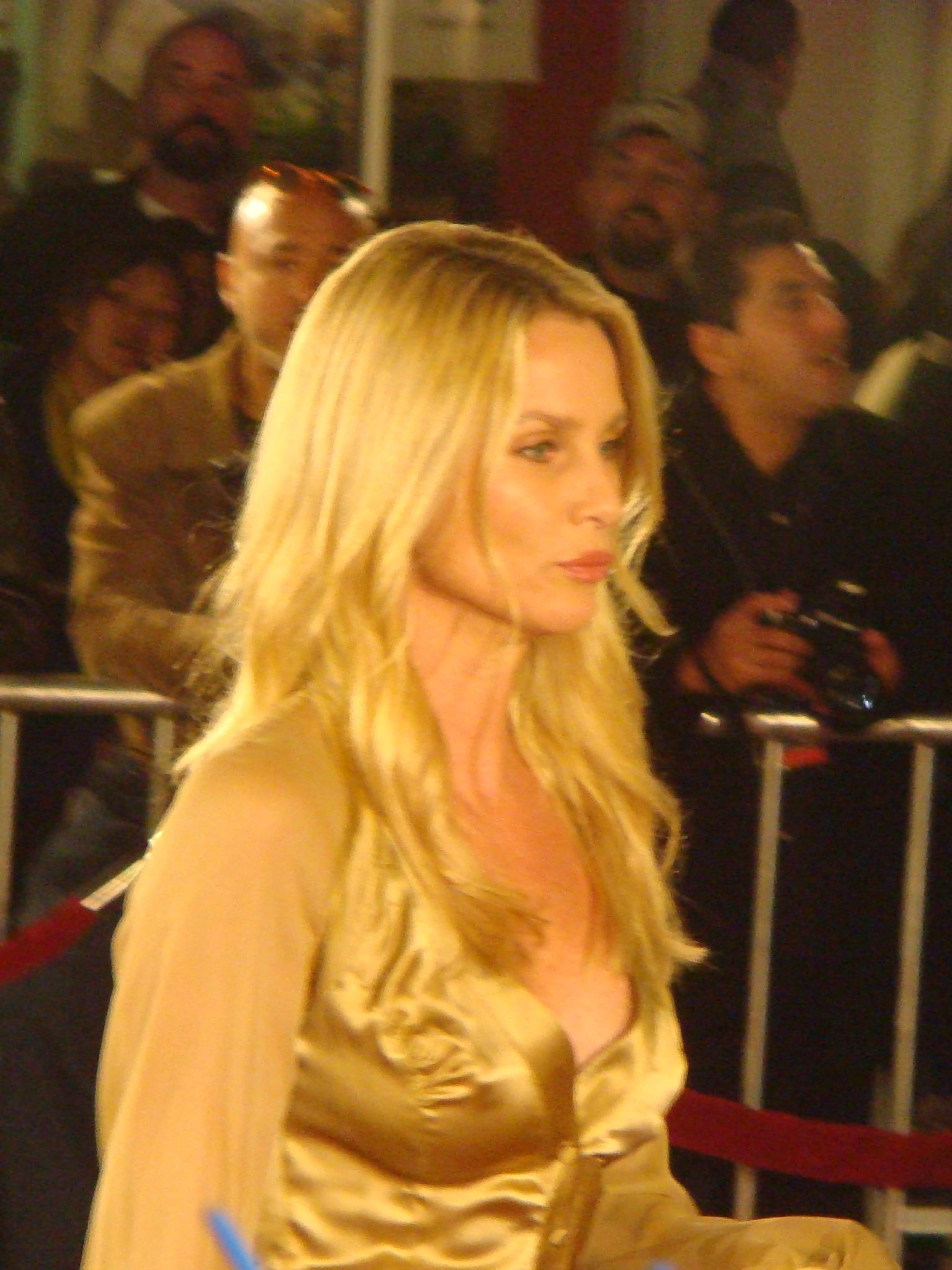
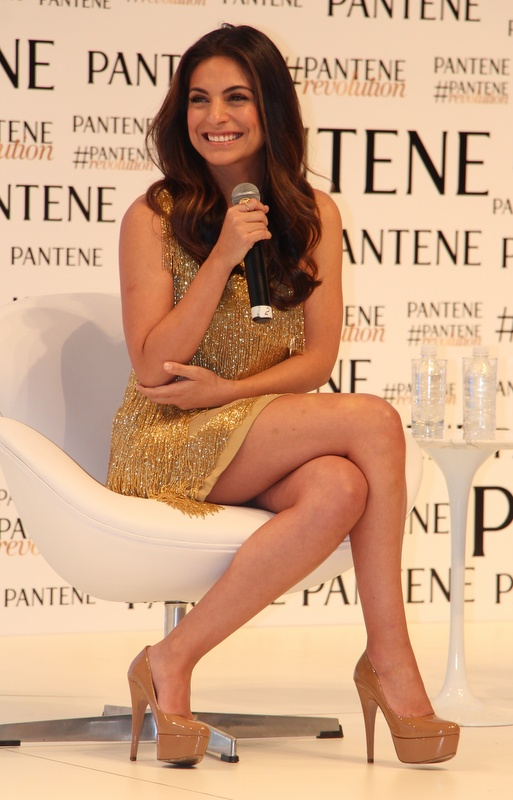
Nicollette Sheridan (left) and Ana Brenda Contreras (right) star as Alexis Carrington and Cristal Jennings in the second season.
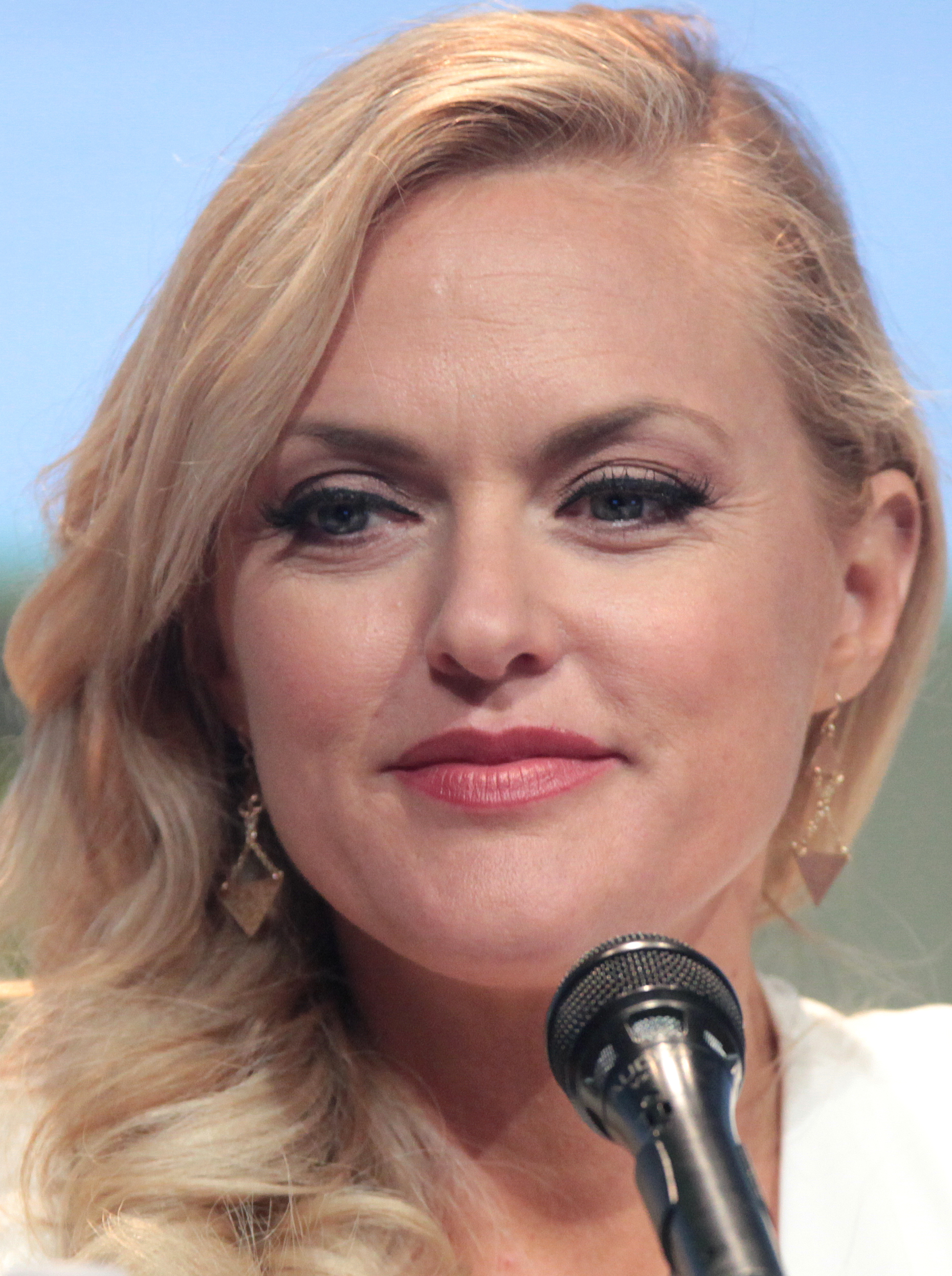
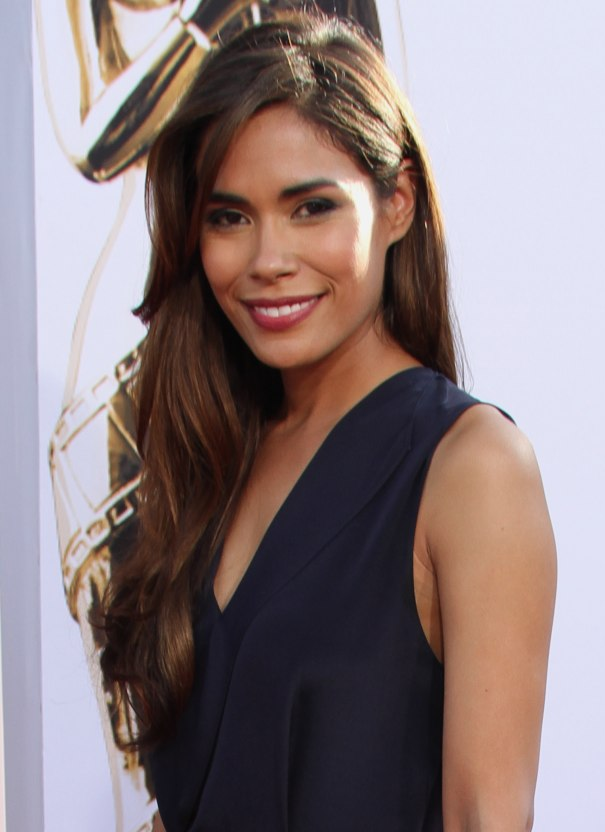
Elaine Hendrix (left) and Daniella Alonso (right) star as Alexis Carrington Colby and Cristal Jennings Carrington starting in the third season.

=== Development ===
In September 2016, it was announced that a reboot of the 1980s prime time soap opera Dynasty was in development at The CW, co-written by Josh Schwartz, Stephanie Savage, and Sallie Patrick. Savage said, "All of us have worked on shows that owe a huge debt to Dynasty, so it's kind of in our writing DNA to do this show." The trio discussed what they found unique and attractive about the original series, and how best to preserve those elements in an update. They also met with Richard and Esther Shapiro, the creators of Dynasty, who were ultimately attached as producers. Schwartz said, "We are definitely living in an age of dynasties. Whether it's the Trumps or the Clintons or the Kardashians or the Murdochs, our news is filled with the worlds of family dynasties and that was exciting for us." Savage added, "When we first sat down with the Shapiros to talk about rebooting the show, they talked a lot about family. No matter the villainous things that they did, they never stopped loving each other. I think we took that core concept and then just talked about how to place the idea in the historical context of our day." Patrick noted that the 1980s series was progressive for its time, dealing with issues like race, women in the workplace, and gay acceptance. She said, "We're trying to figure out how do we respect what that show was doing then and pushing it even farther in our version." De la Fuente said, "We're trying to make it stand on its own and be its own thing. But we have to pay homage to the original and the classic stuff that people remember from Dynasty, like the fashion, the catfights and the opulence of it all, is of course in our show. It wouldn't be Dynasty otherwise." Patrick said, "We really enjoy looking back through the old series and finding dramatic character-driven moments that they featured, but then making them our own and modernizing them. But at the same time, you can't do a reboot without making it your own, and I think over the course of the season, especially towards the end of the year, we started letting go a little bit more, and while there are a lot of Easter eggs for original viewers...and there are plot points that we've kind of rebranded...but we try not to tie ourselves too much to the old show, because sometimes that anchor can tie the show down."

The new series finds heiress Fallon Carrington facing off against her soon-to-be stepmother Cristal, a Hispanic woman. Patrick said, "It was important to me as a working woman to have two women fighting over the future of the dynasty." Schwartz said of the rival characters:

Even when you watch the original, Fallon is a character who feels as if she can exist in 2017. She just pops off the screen, and she can take on Krystle, who, in the original, was pure and the moral center of the show. With this new Cristal, we liked the idea of not letting her be quite as pure and raising some questions about her past and having her stir the pot—making her more formidable. That really let us lean into this rivalry between Fallon and Cristal.

Patrick said, "We knew in our version—2017—we wanted Steven's conflict with Blake to be not about him being gay, but about him being liberal." Savage noted, "With Steven Carrington out and proud, it makes sense for Sammy Jo to be a man." Patrick said in August 2017 that Blake's first wife Alexis would be introduced during the first season, but that the role had yet to be cast. She noted, "We knew Alexis was coming before we even started shooting the pilot, which allowed us to pave the way for her ... throughout the season, we hear Blake, Steven, and Fallon's memories about the woman who abandoned their family. So by the time she actually enters the series, we've established expectations about her character—which Alexis will happily break." The role was cast with Nicollette Sheridan in November 2017, and she first appeared in episode 16 in March 2018.

The setting was also moved from Denver to Atlanta, in part because of Atlanta's diversity. Schwartz called the city "a realistic location of this family to be based out of", noting that the Shapiros had arbitrarily picked Denver for the original series and were not creatively attached to it. Patrick said of the change, "Denver was obviously chosen for a few solid reasons at the time, being one of the oil capitals ... For us, Denver didn't have the vibrancy and conflict that we needed." She said that Atlanta is "a super diverse population and a great mixture—where there's conflict between old money and new money." Kelley said, "This modern version represents a more current picture of what's happening in America. The diversity of the cast really represents that." In the update, chauffeur Michael Culhane and the Colby family are African-American. Also, Cristal's Venezuelan origins will allow the show to explore the current geopolitics of that country.

Patrick said that episode seven, "A Taste of Your Own Medicine", "brings to a head so many of the stories that we've been slowly building. It hits the tone of the show perfectly." She added:

We loved the original Dynasty—the camp and the big, surprising soapy twists. We also felt very strongly that we needed to earn those. It would have been hard to come out of the gate with an episode like this. You have to be with the characters long enough to start caring about them. We're cranking up the crazy moving forward.

The episode titles are lines of dialogue from the original series. In addition to reworked characters and plotlines, the reboot contains multiple visual homages to the 1980s series, including props and wardrobe.

=== Casting ===
Nathalie Kelley was cast as Cristal in January 2017, followed by Elizabeth Gillies as Fallon, Sam Adegoke as playboy Jeff Colby, and Robert Christopher Riley as Blake's chauffeur Michael Culhane in February. Next cast were Grant Show as Fallon's father Blake Carrington, and Rafael de la Fuente as Sam Jones, a gay male version of the original series' Sammy Jo Carrington, in March. The remaining main cast members are James Mackay as Fallon's gay brother Steven, and Alan Dale as Carrington majordomo Anders. Additional recurring performers include Nick Wechsler as Cristal's ex-lover Matthew Blaisdel, Brianna Brown as Matthew's wife Claudia, Wakeema Hollis as Jeff's sister Monica Colby, and Adam Huber as Liam Ridley, Fallon's new husband. In November 2017, Nicollette Sheridan was cast in the role of Blake's ex-wife Alexis Carrington, and was later promoted to series regular status for season two. Other guest stars include Elena Tovar as Iris Machado, Cristal's sister and Sam's mother; Bill Smitrovich as Thomas Carrington, Blake's estranged father; and Hakeem Kae-Kazim as Cesil Colby, Jeff and Monica's father.

In June 2018, Kelley told E! News that she would not be returning for season two. She later said, "I think I wasn't up to the challenge of a nighttime soap ... I think the best thing they felt they could do is start afresh." The CW announced in August 2018 that Ana Brenda Contreras had been cast as "the real Cristal Flores" for the second season. Maddison Brown was also cast as Anders's daughter, Kirby. A May 2018 press release teased that the show would introduce Blake's half-sister Dominique Deveraux, Jeff and Monica's mother, in season two. In November 2018, The CW confirmed that Mackay would no longer be a series regular after the first four episodes of season two, but would return later in the season. The CW announced on February 25, 2019, that Sheridan would be leaving Dynasty to focus on "some personal family responsibilities." Sheridan said in her own statement that she was leaving to spend more time with her terminally ill mother in Los Angeles. She last appeared in the episode "Motherly Overprotectiveness". In March 2019, Sam Underwood began appearing as Blake and Alexis's kidnapped eldest child, Adam. Elizabeth Gillies, who was already playing Fallon on the show, took over the role after Sheridan's departure near the end of the second season. Her three-episode portrayal was a temporary recast to give producers time to find a suitable replacement for Sheridan. On March 22, 2019, it was announced that Michael Michele had been cast as Blake's half-sister Dominique. Michele first appeared in "New Lady in Town".

In July 2019, it was announced that Contreras would not be returning for season three for personal reasons, and that Daniella Alonso would take over the role of Cristal. On October 11, 2019, it was announced that recurring performers Adam Huber and Michael Michele had been promoted to series regulars. On October 28, 2019, it was announced that the role of Alexis had been recast with Elaine Hendrix, who would appear as a series regular. Original cast member Dale's character was killed off in the August 2021 episode "Go Rescue Someone Else". The casting of Eliza Bennett as Alexis's secret daughter by Blake, Amanda Carrington, was announced in August 2021. In January 2022, it was reported that Pej Vahdat had been cast as Dex Dexter for season five.

=== Filming ===
The pilot was filmed in Atlanta. On May 10, 2017, the Dynasty reboot received a series order at The CW. A preview trailer was released on May 18, 2017. Dynasty premiered on The CW in the United States on Wednesday, October 11, 2017, and on November 8, 2017, The CW picked up the series for a full second season of 22 episodes. Sheridan's casting was a key factor in the decision to give Dynasty a back nine order of episodes after the initial 13. On April 2, 2018, The CW renewed the series for a second season, which premiered on October 12, 2018. Dynasty was renewed for a third season on January 31, 2019, which premiered on October 11, 2019. In May 2019, Deadline Hollywood reported that co-executive producer Josh Reims would succeed Sallie Patrick as executive producer and showrunner for season three. On January 7, 2020, Dynasty was renewed for a fourth season, which premiered on May 7, 2021.

Production of Dynasty was suspended in March 2020 as a direct result of the COVID-19 pandemic. Filming of only twenty of the twenty-two ordered episodes of the third season had been completed at that time. Gillies said, "So there is no finale at this juncture, and there is no episode before the finale. So it ends in a very weird place ... I don't know if we'll pick up the finale later, I'm not sure what the plan is. It certainly shouldn't end on the episode we finished, because it's just really random and nothing’s resolved. I apologize if it does." It was later confirmed that the 20th episode of the season, "My Hangover's Arrived", would serve as the season finale, though it has not been announced whether the remaining two episodes of the season will be produced later. It was reported that if production resumed by late fall 2020, season four would be expected to premiere in spring 2021 or later, and The CW's president Mark Pedowitz announced that all of the network's series would be producing "our normal episodic counts" for the post-pandemic season. Production on the fourth season officially began on October 15, 2020. On February 3, 2021, ahead of its fourth season premiere, The CW renewed the series for a fifth season, which premiered on December 20, 2021. Filming for season five took place between October 22, 2021 to August 2, 2022. On May 12, 2022, The CW announced the fifth season would be Dynasty's last.

=== Music ===
The pilot includes a flashback of a young Steven playing the original Dynasty theme by Bill Conti on piano. An updated, 15-second version debuted as an opening credits sequence in the 1980s-themed third episode, "Guilt is for Insecure People", but is only used in some episodes. Composer Paul Leonard-Morgan worked with Troy Nõka to get "an '80s-rock vibe" for the song, to match Leonard-Morgan's soundtrack for the series. The new theme was recorded with an orchestra at Capitol Records in Hollywood, featuring Los Angeles Philharmonic lead trumpet player Tom Hooten.

In the season two premiere "Twenty-Three Skidoo", Gillies sings a 1920s version of "Bizarre Love Triangle" by New Order. In the season three episode "Something Desperate", Fallon hallucinates four musical numbers, sung by Gillies, Underwood, Show, Alonso, and De la Fuente.

In the season four episode "Vows Are Still Sacred", Gillies sings "More Than Me", a song she wrote in collaboration with her husband, Michael Corcoran. A studio version of "More Than Me" was released on the Lakeshore Records YouTube channel on May 18, 2021, and on digital music platforms on May 21, 2021.

== Broadcast ==
Dynasty premiered on The CW in the United States on Wednesday, October 11, 2017, with the season 2 premiere of Riverdale as its lead-in. The series moved to Fridays starting with the fourteenth episode. Season two began airing on October 12, 2018, and season three premiered on October 11, 2019. Season four premiered on May 7, 2021, and season five premiered on December 20, 2021. The final episode aired on September 16, 2022. Each full season is released on Netflix in the US several days after the season finale airs.

Netflix acquired exclusive international broadcast rights to Dynasty, making episodes available as an original series on the platform less than a day after their original American broadcast in seasons one and two. Unlike previous seasons, the full third season was released globally on Netflix on May 23, 2020, a few weeks after the season finale.

Les Moonves, the then-head of CBS Corporation, said in 2017, "We own 100 percent of [Dynasty], and we've already licensed it to Netflix in 188 countries ... So this means Dynasty is profitable before it even hits the air." Pedowitz said in January 2018, "I'm disappointed in the ratings, I wanted it to do more, but I'm happy with the production values that Josh, Steph and Sallie are doing. There are changes coming, I'm thrilled to have Nicollette [Sheridan] ... I'm looking forward to Nicollette and Liz [Gillies] really going at it as a mother-daughter situation, and I think that will add some juice to the show."

In 2022, executive producer Josh Reims admitted that, due to the international success of Dynasty on Netflix, "there was literally no discussion about the ratings ever, which is great." Regarding The CW's marketing of Dynasty, "I don't think it mattered. I think people were just waiting for it to drop on Netflix. Online, people were asking when's the show starting on Netflix. So it felt like by season three, at least there was already a built-in audience."

== Reception ==
=== Ratings ===
Viewership and ratings per season of Dynasty
Season	Timeslot (ET)	Episodes	First aired		Last aired		TV season	Viewership rank	Avg. viewers (millions)	Avg. 18–49 rating
Season	Timeslot (ET)	Episodes	Date	Viewers (millions)	Date	Viewers (millions)	TV season	Viewership rank	Avg. viewers (millions)	Avg. 18–49 rating
1	Wednesday 9:00 pm (1–13); Friday 8:00 pm (14–22)	22	October 11, 2017	1.26	May 11, 2018	0.56	2017–18	145	1.00	0.3
2	Friday 8:00 pm	22	October 12, 2018	0.64	May 24, 2019	0.53	2018–19	141	0.80	0.2
3	Friday 9:00 pm	20	October 11, 2019	0.45	May 8, 2020	0.37	2019–20	133	0.59	0.2
4	Friday 9:00 pm (1–19, 21–22); Friday 8:00 pm (20)	22	May 7, 2021	0.24	October 1, 2021	0.22	2020–21	161	0.40	0.1
5	Monday 8:00 pm (1); Monday 9:00 pm (2); Friday 9:00 pm (3–22)	22	December 20, 2021	0.38	September 16, 2022	0.19	2021–22	140	0.39	0.1

=== Critical response ===
The review aggregator website Rotten Tomatoes's consensus reads, "Dynasty's revival retains enough of its predecessor's over-the-top allure to offer a glamorous guilty pleasure in its first season, even if it never quite recaptures the magic of the original." The website reported a 49% approval rating with an average rating of 6.54/10 based on 47 reviews for season one. The website's Metacritic, which uses a weighted average, assigned a score of 52 out of 100 based on 17 critics, indicating "mixed or average reviews". Chris Harnick of E! Online called the pilot "soapy and fun", adding that the series is "a worthy heir to the original show and Josh Schwartz and Stephanie Savage's previous offering Gossip Girl and The O.C.". Adweek called the pilot inferior to Gossip Girl and the original Dynasty, but suggested that its pairing with Riverdale "could provide audiences a guilty-pleasure double-feature". Tierney Bricker of E! Online dubbed Kelley "this season's breakout star", with Gillies "hot on her Louboutin heels". However, many critics claimed that there were not enough soap opera vibes in the reboot compared to the original.

For season two, some critics found the continuing series to be more of a soap opera and more intriguing.

=== Awards and nominations ===
Year	Award	Category	Nominee(s)	Result	Ref.
2018	Dorian Awards	Campy TV Show of the Year	Dynasty	Nominated	
2018	People's Choice Awards	Revival Show of 2018	Dynasty	Won	
2019	The Queerties	TV Reboot	Dynasty	Nominated	
2019	Teen Choice Awards	Choice Drama TV Actor	Adam Huber	Nominated	

== Home media ==
DVD name	Ep #	Release date
Dynasty: Season One	22	September 25, 2018
Dynasty: Season Two	22	December 13, 2019
Dynasty: Season Three	20	October 27, 2020
Dynasty: Season Four	22	January 18, 2022
Dynasty: The Final Season	22	January 24, 2023
Dynasty: The Complete Series	108	January 24, 2023
