= James Mackay (actor) =

Australian actor (born 1984)

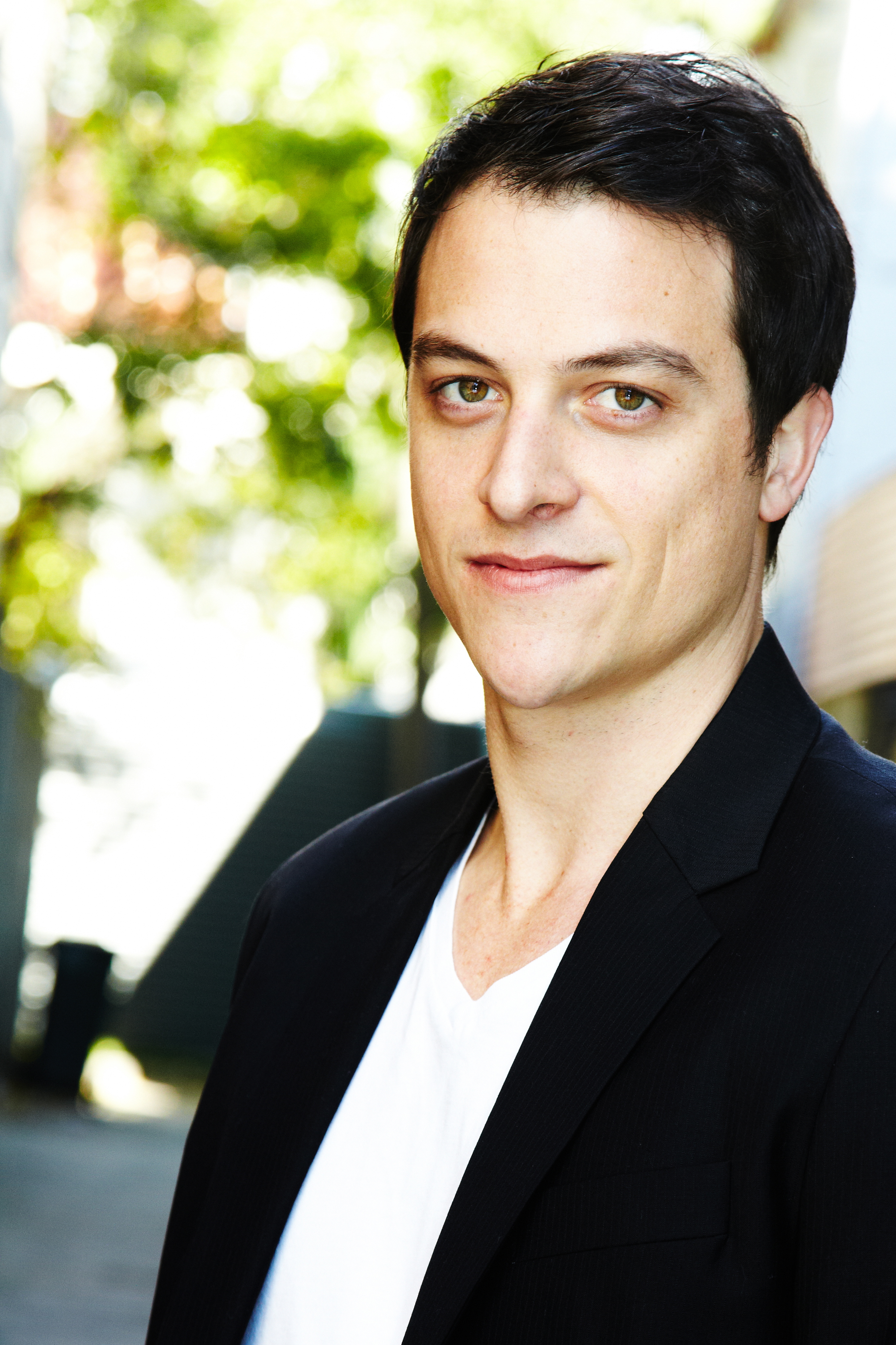
- Mackay in 2012
- Born: 20 July 1984 (age 42); Sydney, New South Wales, Australia
- Occupation: Actor
- Years active: 2009–present
- Father: Hugh Mackay

James Wilson Mackay (born 20 July 1984) is an Australian actor known for The CW television series Dynasty, as well as roles in films and on stage.

== Early life ==
Mackay attended Sydney Grammar School in Sydney, Australia, where he first started acting in school plays.

Mackay studied at the University of Sydney, graduating with a Bachelor of Arts in history and English literature, before training as an actor at the Western Australian Academy of Performing Arts in Perth.

He is the son of Hugh Mackay.

== Career ==
=== Stage ===
In 2013 Mackay played Irwin in the Alan Bennett play The History Boys at the Sydney Opera House, alongside John Wood, Heather Mitchell and Paul Goddard. In 2012 he performed with the Sydney Theatre Company as Danceny in Les Liaisons Dangereuses, with Hugo Weaving and Pamela Rabe.

Mackay was an artistic associate of independent theatre company Cry Havoc. He worked on two shows with the company, William Shakespeare's Julius Caesar in 2009 (playing Marc Antony), and Anton Chekhov's Three Sisters in 2010 (playing Andrey), for which he also collaborated on an original music score.

In 2021, he starred as Orlando in the Melbourne Theatre Company's production of As You Like It.

=== Film and television ===
Mackay appeared as William Beaumont in the 2015 Australian film The Dressmaker with Kate Winslet, Sarah Snook, Judy Davis, Liam Hemsworth and Hugo Weaving.

Other credits include Don't Be Afraid of the Dark, starring Katie Holmes and Guy Pearce, and The Lovers, directed by Palme d'Or winner and Oscar nominee Roland Joffé. Mackay also played roles in the 2012 horror-thriller Redd Inc (released as Inhuman Resources in the US), Matchbox Pictures’ series The Straits, a crime drama filmed in Cairns and the Torres Straits, and the 2012 television comedy Micro Nation. He has had guest starring roles on Love Child, The Tomorrow People and The Leftovers.

In 2014, he starred in and composed the music for the short film Manny Gets Censored, narrated by Hugo Weaving.

In 2016 and 2017, he had roles in Pirates of the Caribbean: Dead Men Tell No Tales, Hacksaw Ridge, and Battle of the Sexes.

From 2017-2019, he played the role of Steven Carrington on The CW's Dynasty reboot.

In 2021, he was cast in the film The Girl at the Window. In 2022, it was announced that he had joined the cast of the mini-series Savage River, co-starring with Katherine Langford. The project reunites him with The Dressmaker director Jocelyn Moorhouse.

== Awards ==
In June 2013 Mackay was the recipient of the fifth annual Australians in Film Heath Ledger Scholarship.

== Filmography ==
=== Film ===
Year	Title	Role	Notes
2008	Misconception	Matt	Short film
2008	Ace Neally	Short film	
2009	Don't Be Afraid of the Dark	The Librarian	
2010	Connection	Dan	Short film
2011	Hairpin	Simon	Short film
2012	Redd Inc, aka "Inhuman Resources"	Rudy Khan	
2012	Being Venice	Fireman	
2013	The Lovers	Charles Stewart	Also known as Singularity and Time Traveller (UK)
2014	Manny Gets Censored	Manny	Short film
2015	Skin Deep	Nurse Ben Potter	
2015	The Dressmaker	William Beaumont	
2016	Hacksaw Ridge	Prosecutor	
2017	Pirates of the Caribbean: Dead Men Tell No Tales	Maddox	
2017	Battle of the Sexes	Barry Court	
2022	The Girl at the Window		

=== Television ===
Year	Title	Role	Notes
2010	Rescue: Special Ops	Saxon Blake	Episode: "Out of the Ashes"
2012	The Straits	Joel Thomson	5 episodes
2012	Micro Nation	Lindsay McFadden	Episode: "Meet Pullamawang"
2014	The Tomorrow People	Julian Masters	Episodes: "Enemy of My Enemy", "Rumble"
2017	The Leftovers	Bernard	Episode: "G'Day Melbourne"
2017	Love Child	Lance	Episode: "Episode Three" (Season 4)
2017–2019, 2022	Dynasty	Steven Carrington	Series regular (season 1–2), guest (season 5)
2022	Savage River	Simon	Series regular

=== Theatre ===
Year	Play	Role	Venue
2009	Julius Caesar	Marc Antony	Cry Havoc
2010	Three Sisters	Andrey	Cry Havoc
2012	Les Liaisons Dangereuses	Danceny	Sydney Theatre Company
2013	The History Boys	Irwin	Peach Theatre Company
2021	As You Like It	Orlando	Melbourne Theatre Company
