= Rafael de la Fuente =

Venezuelan actor and singer

- Born: 11 November 1986 (age 39); Caracas, Venezuela
- Occupations: Actor, singer
- Years active: 2009–present
- Known for: Sammy Jo in Dynasty

Rafael Alfredo De la Fuente Torres Jr. (born 11 November 1986) is a Venezuelan-born American actor and singer. He is known for his roles in the fantasy television series Grachi (2011–2013) and as Sam "Sammy Jo" Jones in the CW soap opera reboot Dynasty (2017–2022) His other notable role was in the first and second seasons of the drama series Empire (2015–2016) and Diego Moreno in the CBS drama Fire Country (2023–2025).

== Early life ==
Rafael Alfredo De la Fuente Torres Jr. was born in Caracas, Venezuela. on 11 November 1986, to Rafael Sr., a bariatric surgeon, and Helena. He has one younger sister, Alma. From childhood, his ambition was to pursue a career as a singer, and he sang in his church choir from the age of nine.

After high school, he moved to the United States to study theatre at the University of Tampa, graduating with a Bachelor of Arts degree in 2009. He began acting on stage at the nearby Falk Theater before transitioning to on-screen roles. His first acting opportunity came by chance when he was 18 when a casting director visiting his father's medical office noticed a photograph of him, leading to a two-episode appearance on a Venezuelan telenovela.

== Career ==
=== Early career (2009–2014) ===
De la Fuente's first on-screen credit was an appearance in the Telemundo telenovela Más sabe el diablo in 2009. In 2011, he appeared as Max in the telenovela Aurora Followed by the recurring role of Diego Forlán in the Nickelodeon Latin America fantasy series, Grachi, which became a main role in the second season. In 2014, de la Fuente appeared as Coach Julio on Every Witch Way, an English-language remake of Grachi produced for Nickelodeon.

Also in 2014, he appeared in the feature film The One I Wrote For You, followed by Lift Me Up (2015).

=== Breakthrough in American television (2015–2017) ===
De la Fuente gained wider recognition in American primetime television with his recurring role as Michael Sanchez, the boyfriend of Jamal Lyon, in the Fox musical prime time soap opera, Empire (2015–2016). In 2017, he appeared as Cleve Jones's boyfriend Ricardo Canto in the ABC miniseries When We Rise.

In 2017, he appeared as Ricardo Canto, the long-term partner of activist Cleve Jones, in the ABC miniseries When We Rise, a historical drama chronicling the LGBTQ+ rights movement. That same year he made a guest appearance in American Horror Story: Cult.

=== Dynasty (2017–2022) ===
In March 2017, de la Fuente was cast as a series regular in The CW's Dynasty reboot , a reboot of the 1980s primetime soap opera co-created by the producers of Gossip Girl. He played Sam Jones, a gay reimagining of the original series' character Sammy Jo Carrington, famously portrayed by Heather Locklear.

During the run of the show, he also appeared in the films ¡He matado a mi marido! (2018) and Antidote (2018).

=== Post-Dynasty (2023–present) ===
In 2023, De La Fuente starred opposite Katie Leclerc in the Hallmark Christmas movie, Letters to Santa.

Also in 2023, he was cast in the recurring role of Diego in the second season of the CBS drama series, Fire Country. Playing a charming paramedic, firefighter, and combat veteran who trained Gabriela Perez and became romantically involved with her.

In January 2026, he starred alongside Jaicy Elliot in the Hallmark Channel television film Love on the Amazon, playing Danny, a riverboat captain who guides a woman through the Amazon in search of her sister.

== Other works ==
De La Fuente is a spokesperson for Uniquely You, a brand of ACV gummy vitamins, and the charity website Every.Org. He actively supports many charitable causes, especially those effecting the environment and the LGBTQ community.

== Personal life ==
De La Fuente is gay. He has spoken about the significance of Ricky Martin's coming out as a formative moment that gave him the courage to embrace his own identity. In an interview on Latino Alternative TV's The Q Agenda, de la Fuente recalled that seeing a fellow Latino artist come out so publicly made him feel that he too could live authentically both on and off screen, having kept his queerness private for years despite coming out at age 21.

He has been an active advocate for LGBTQ+ visibility, as well as for Latinx representation in Hollywood, frequently drawing on his experience as a Venezuelan immigrant to speak about immigration issues. In a 2020 interview, he described the importance of showing that immigrants "are just people that are trying to survive, especially because they come from places that are in political turmoil."

As of 2023, de la Fuente was romantically linked with singer-songwriter John Duff.

== Filmography ==
=== Film ===
| Year | Title | Role | Notes |
|---|---|---|---|
| 2014 | The One I Wrote for You | Rafael Amato | |
| 2015 | Lift Me Up | Erik | |
| 2018 | Antidote | Manuel | |
| 2019 | ¡He matado a mi marido! | El Topo | |
| 2023 | Letters to Santa | Enrique | Hallmark Channel |
| 2026 | Love on the Amazon | Danny | Hallmark Channel |
| TBA | Cuba, Paraíso | Jovan | |

=== Television ===
| Year | Title | Role | Notes |
|---|---|---|---|
| 2009 | Más sabe el diablo | Jorge Giraldo | Episodic role |
| 2011 | Aurora | Max | Episodic role |
| 2011–2013 | Grachi | Diego Forlán | Main role |
| 2014 | Every Witch Way | Julio | Recurring role |
| 2015–2016 | Empire | Michael Sanchez | Recurring role |
| 2017 | When We Rise | Ricardo Canto | 2 episodes |
| 2017 | American Horror Story: Cult | Picnic Guy | Episodic role |
| 2017–2022 | Dynasty | Sam "Sammy Jo" Jones | Main role |
| 2023–2025 | Fire Country | Diego Moreno | Recurring role |
