= 1st & Ten (1984 TV series) =

Television series

- Genre: Comedy; Sports
- Created by: Carl Kleinschmitt
- Starring: Delta Burke; O. J. Simpson; Shannon Tweed; John Matuszak; Jason Beghe; Geoffrey Scott; Keith Amos; Paul Tuerpe; Prince Hughes; Shanna Reed; Reid Shelton; Donald Gibb; Keith Amos
- Country of origin: United States
- No. of seasons: 6
- No. of episodes: 80

Production
- Executive producers: Donald Kushner; Peter Locke
- Camera setup: Single-camera
- Running time: 25 minutes
- Production company: The Kushner-Locke Company

Original release
- Network: HBO
- Release: December 2, 1984 – January 23, 1991

1st & Ten is an American sitcom that aired between December 1984 and January 1991 on the cable television network HBO. Featuring series regulars Delta Burke and veteran Reid Shelton, it was one of cable's first attempts to lure the lucrative sitcom audience away from the then-dominant "Big Three" broadcast television networks, by taking advantage of their freedom to include occasional profanity and nudity.

== Plot ==
The sports-themed series follows the on-and off-field antics of the fictional American football team, the California Bulls. The team changed owners throughout the series' history, with the premise that a woman is in charge.

During the first season Diane Barrow (Delta Burke) becomes the owner of her ex-husband's team as part of a divorce settlement, after he has an affair with the team's tight end. She quickly learns the ups and downs of pro football. In one episode, she is forced to coach the team herself after the head coach, Ernie Denardo, is placed in the hospital. She also has constant battles with her General Manager/husband's nephew, who has dealings with the local mob, and fights off advances made by her quarterback (played by Geoffrey Scott).

The second season dealt with two themes: training camp and the playoffs. Barrow was dealing with her players taking recreational drugs during training camp. During this season, O. J. Simpson joined the cast as T.D. Parker, a veteran running back who is forced to make the transition from player to coach. Two real-life football stars made cameo appearances: Marcus Allen portrayed a rookie who was taking over T.D.'s spot on the team, and Vince Ferragamo played "Mainstreet" Manneti, a veteran quarterback. Jason Beghe joined the cast to play Tom Yinessa, a walk-on quarterback who deals with his overnight celebrity.

Delta Burke left the show midway through the third season, after committing herself exclusively to CBS' Designing Women, which she had begun starring on in 1986, and which was renewed. Diane loses control of the Bulls to Teddy Schraeder, her former lover, who manipulates everyone to his own ends. His antics include having T.D. fire Ernie as coach, letting Yinessa practice without a contract, and ignoring steroid use. Legal issues force him to leave the country and turn control over to his daughter, played by Leah Ayres.

Season 4 was briefly renamed 1st and Ten: The Bulls Mean Business. Shanna Reed joins the cast as the team's new female president, representing the new owners, the Dodds Corporation. Her attempts to innovate include bringing a female soccer player in to kick, and signing an Olympic sprinter as wide receiver. Joe Namath has a cameo appearance. Shannon Tweed would replace her in Season 5, and remain with the show to the end. The show was renamed 1st and Ten: Do it Again for the fifth season. The final season was 1st and Ten: In Your Face.

== Series themes ==
- The Bulls somehow manage to make it to the championship football game, yet lose in a controversial, heartbreaking manner.
- Mad Dog and Dr. Death haze the rookies and rally the defense.
- Bubba and Jethro help each other with their various (often sex-related) mishaps. Bubba's voracious appetite is also a running gag
- The volatile ownership position of the franchise.
- Controversial aspects of professional sports in the late 1980s: steroids, the instant replay, women in the locker room, the role of free agency, multi-sport stars, endorsements.

== Game footage ==
Footage was used from USFL's Los Angeles Express. During simulated game shots, the Bulls football helmet has a decal of horns on the side. When the show uses actual game footage, you can clearly see the letters "L" and "A" on the helmets side, representing the L.A. Express. The Bulls quarterbacks wore #14 to match the actual game footage of L.A. Express real-life quarterback Tom Ramsey. Many generic shots of USFL stadiums were used to depict where the Bulls were playing. As the series went on, aerial shots were used of Los Angeles Memorial Coliseum to represent the Bulls home stadium. Game footage from the USFL stopped midway through the third season, as scripted football plays were being used instead, and the USFL had ceased operations by that point.

At one point, Denardo suggests trading for a running back. He mentions the Bulls from "that other league." He was talking about the Jacksonville Bulls from the United States Football League.

== Characters ==
Only Donald Gibb, Cliff Frazier, Prince Hughes and Reid Shelton appeared in all six seasons. John Kassir and O.J. Simpson joined the cast the second season and stayed till the show's end.

=== Main ===
- Delta Burke as Diane Barrow (seasons 1–3)
- Jason Beghe as Tom Yinessa
- Cliff Frazier as Jethro Snell
- Donald Gibb as Leslie "Dr. Death" Krunchner
- Prince Hughes as Buford "Bubba" Kincaid
- Stan Kamber as Coach Grier
- Shannon Tweed as Kristy Fulbright
- John Kassir as Zagreb Shkenusky
- Tommy 'Tiny' Lister as Otis
- Tony Longo as Mad Dog Smears
- Michael Toland as Billy Cooper
- O. J. Simpson as T.D. Parker
- Leah Ayres as Jill Schrader
- Keith Amos as Miracle Miles Coolidge

=== Guest stars ===
- Mariann Aalda as Ellen
- Robert Costanzo as Jake
- Alexa Hamilton as Kay
- J. C. Quinn as Red Griswald
- Liam Sullivan as Doctor

=== Special Guest Star ===
- Roy Thinnes as Teddy Schrader
- Mark Lonow as Max Green
- John Matuszak as John Manzak
- Keith Amos as "Miracle Miles" Coolidge
- Reid Shelton as Coach Ernie Denardo
- Gail: Shanna Reed
- Dr. Doc Phillips: Jim Antonio
- Johnny Valentine: Sam J. Jones
- Elvin Putts: Jeff Hochendoner
- Jamie Waldren: Jeff Kaake
- Mac Daniels: Jay Kerr
- Roger Barrow: Clayton Landey
- Rona Gold: Ruta Lee
- Deacon: John Benjamin Martin
- Johnny Gunn: Christopher Meloni
- Carl Witherspoon: Sam Scarber
- Bob Dorsey: Geoffrey Scott
- Police officer: Ron Shipp
- Joe "Mainstreet" Manneti: Vince Ferragamo
- 'Tombstone' Packer: Lawrence Taylor
- Mace Petty: Marshall R. Teague
- Rick Lambert: Marcus Allen
- Billy Cooper: Michael Toland
- Bulls lineman: Arthur Avant
- Bulls wide receiver: A. J. DiSpirito

== Episodes ==
=== Season 1: 1984–85 ===
No. overall	No. in season	Title	Directed by	Written by	Original release date
1	1	"By the Bulls"	Rod Daniel	Carl Kleinschmitt	December 2, 1984
2	2	"The Opener"	Bruce Seth Green	Nick Arnold	December 2, 1984
3	3	"All Roads Lead to Dayton"	Bruce Seth Green	Nick Arnold	December 9, 1984
4	4	"The Slump"	Bruce Seth Green	Nick Arnold	December 16, 1984
5	5	"Play Me or Trade Me"	Bruce Seth Green	Eric Cohen	December 23, 1984
6	6	"You Are Who You Eat"	Bruce Seth Green	Nick Arnold	December 30, 1984
7	7	"Uneasy Lies the Head"	Bruce Seth Green	George Yanok	January 6, 1985
8	8	"The Sins of the Quarterback"	Bruce Seth Green	Gary H. Miller	January 13, 1985
9	9	"I Only Read Defenses"	Bruce Seth Green	George Tricker & Neil Rosen	January 20, 1985
10	10	"Wine Time"	Bruce Seth Green	Hank Bradford & Eric Cohen	January 27, 1985
11	11	"Rona's Fling"	Bruce Seth Green	Eric Cohen	February 3, 1985
12	12	"Not Quite Mr. Right"	Bruce Seth Green	Eric Cohen	February 10, 1985
13	13	"Super Bull Sunday"	Bruce Seth Green	Eric Cohen	February 17, 1985

=== Season 2 (The Championship, 1986–87) ===
No. overall	No. in season	Title	Directed by	Written by	Original release date
14	1	"The Rookies"	Bruce Seth Green	Maxwell Pitt & Gary H. Miller	August 25, 1986
15	2	"The Veterans"	Bruce Seth Green	Maxwell Pitt & Gary H. Miller	September 1, 1986
16	3	"A Second Chance"	Bruce Seth Green	Phil Mishkin	September 8, 1986
17	4	"Quarterbacks Tell No Tales"	Bruce Seth Green	Written by : George Yanok; Teleplay by : George Yanok & Gary H. Miller	September 15, 1986
18	5	"California Freeze Out"	Bruce Seth Green	Written by : Maxwell Pitt & Elizabeth A. Bardsley; Teleplay by : Maxwell Pitt & Gary H. Miller	September 22, 1986
19	6	"The Unkindest Cut"	Bruce Seth Green	Written by : Maxwell Pitt & Elizabeth A. Bardsley; Teleplay by : Maxwell Pitt & Gary H. Miller	September 29, 1986
20	7	"Yinessa's Interview"	Burt Brinckerhoff	Written by : Phil Mishkin; Teleplay by : Phil Mishkin & Gary H. Miller	December 30, 1986
21	8	"Easy Come, Easy Go"	Burt Brinckerhoff	Written by : Richard Freiman; Teleplay by : Richard Freiman & Gary H. Miller	January 6, 1987
22	9	"A Family Affair"	Burt Brinckerhoff	Written by : Lee H. Grant; Teleplay by : Lee H. Grant & Gary H Miller	January 13, 1987
23	10	"The Big One"	Burt Brinckerhoff	Written by : Nick Arnold; Teleplay by : Nick Arnold & Gary H. Miller	January 20, 1987

=== Season 3 (Going for Broke, 1987) ===
No. overall	No. in season	Title	Directed by	Written by	Original release date
24	1	"Ernie's Last Quarter"	Stan Lathan	Gary H. Miller	August 5, 1987
25	2	"A Second Chance Once Removed"	Stan Lathan	Phil Mishkin	August 12, 1987
26	3	"A Loaded Gun"	Stan Lathan	Barry Rubinowitz	August 19, 1987
27	4	"The Comeback Trail"	Stan Lathan	Kimmer Ringwald	August 26, 1987
28	5	"Illegal Use of Love"	Stan Lathan	Phil Mishkin	September 2, 1987
29	6	"The Bulls Change Hands"	Stan Lathan	Gary H. Miller	September 9, 1987
30	7	"Mutiny on the Bull Team"	Stan Lathan	Gary H. Miller	October 7, 1987
31	8	"The Brink of Death"	Bruce Seth Green	Jay Abramowitz & Zach Wechsler	October 20, 1987
32	9	"Call for the Hall"	Bruce Seth Green	Barry Gurstein & David Pitlik	November 4, 1987
33	10	"Blood on Blood"	Bruce Seth Green	Phil Mishkin	November 27, 1987
34	11	"Land of the Free (Agent)"	Bruce Seth Green	Jay Abramowitz & Zach Wechsler	December 2, 1987
35	12	"Of Scalpers and Superstars"	Bruce Seth Green	Gary H. Miller	December 9, 1987
36	13	"Championship Game Jinx"	Bruce Seth Green	Gary H. Miller	December 16, 1987

=== Season 4 (The Bulls Mean Business, 1988–89) ===
No. overall	No. in season	Title	Directed by	Written by	Original release date
37	1	"The Bulls Own Up"	Stan Lathan	Gary H. Miller	October 5, 1988
38	2	"The Inmates Buy the Asylum"	Stan Lathan	Kenneth R. Carlton	October 12, 1988
39	3	"Caught in the Draft"	Stan Lathan	Zach Wechsler & Jay Abramowitz	October 19, 1988
40	4	"Down and Out in Bulls' Stadium"	Stan Lathan	Barry Gurstein & David Pitlik	October 26, 1988
41	5	"…The Clock Runs Out"	Stan Lathan	Barry Gurstein & David Pitlik	November 2, 1988
42	6	"The Dark Side"	Stan Lathan	Danny Rivera	November 9, 1988
43	7	"Saturday, Bloody Saturday"	Stan Lathan	Stephen Glantz	November 16, 1988
44	8	"Injustice for All"	Stan Lathan	Gary H. Miller	November 23, 1988
45	9	"Team Picture"	Stan Lathan	Kenneth R. Carlton	November 30, 1988
46	10	"Out of the Past"	Stan Lathan	Jay Abramowitz	December 7, 1988
47	11	"Final Bow"	Stan Lathan	Zach Wechsler	December 14, 1988
48	12	"Duty Calls"	Stan Lathan	Farnsworth Gallagher	December 21, 1988
49	13	"The High and the Mighty"	Stan Lathan	Farnsworth Gallagher	December 28, 1988
50	14	"The Irreducible Bottom Line"	Stan Lathan	Marty Kurtz	January 4, 1989

=== Season 5 (Do It Again, 1989–90) ===
No. overall	No. in season	Title	Directed by	Written by	Original release date
51	1	"The Book According to Zagreb"	Stan Lathan	Maxwell Pitt	October 11, 1989
52	2	"The Con"	Stan Lathan	Maxwell Pitt	October 18, 1989
53	3	"False Start"	Stan Lathan	Tom O'Brien	October 25, 1989
54	4	"Mind Games"	Stan Lathan	Bill Fuller & Jim Pond	November 1, 1989
55	5	"Love and Marriage"	Stan Lathan	Scott Spencer Gorden	November 8, 1989
56	6	"Clean and Sober"	Stan Lathan	Richard Marcus	November 15, 1989
57	7	"Blood Money"	Stan Lathan	Maxwell Pitt	November 22, 1989
58	8	"Vindication"	Stan Lathan	Daniel Finneran	December 6, 1989
59	9	"Gunn and Bullette"	Stan Lathan	David Ehrman	December 13, 1989
60	10	"Heaven Help Me"	Stan Lathan	Maxwell Pitt	December 20, 1989
61	11	"Surprise, Surprise"	Stan Lathan	W. Reed Moran & Grant Moran and Maxwell Pitt	December 27, 1989
62	12	"All's Fair in Love and Football"	Ethan Lathan	Scott Spencer Gorden	January 10, 1990
63	13	"Earn This One for Ernie"	Stan Lathan	Richard Marcus	January 17, 1990
64	14	"Who Stole Johnny Gunn?"	Stan Lathan	Maxwell Pitt	January 24, 1990

=== Season 6 (1990–91) ===
No. overall	No. in season	Title	Directed by	Written by	Original release date
65	1	"Opening Night"	Peter Bonerz	Bruce Kirschbaum	October 3, 1990
66	2	"Old Dogs... New Tricks"	Peter Bonerz	Scott Spencer Gorden	October 10, 1990
67	3	"She's Ba-ack"	Peter Bonerz	Richard Marcus	October 17, 1990
68	4	"Altared States"	Peter Bonerz	David Ehrman	October 24, 1990
69	5	"Going in Style"	Peter Bonerz	Maxwell Pitt	October 31, 1990
70	6	"Don't Powerburst My Bubble"	Peter Bonerz	Tom O'Brien	November 7, 1990
71	7	"The Squeeze"	Peter Bonerz	Jim Kearns	November 14, 1990
72	8	"Take My Wives... Please!"	Peter Bonerz	Nick Arnold	November 21, 1990
73	9	"Bull Day Afternoon"	Peter Bonerz	Bruce Kirschbaum	November 28, 1990
74	10	"Sex, Bulls and Videotape"	Peter Bonerz	Larry Balmagia	December 5, 1990
75	11	"Irma Za-greb"	Peter Bonerz	Richard Marcus	December 12, 1990
76	12	"If I Didn't Play Football"	Peter Bonerz	Scott Spencer Gorden	December 19, 1990
77	13	"A Roast is a Roast"	Peter Bonerz	Richard Marcus	December 26, 1990
78	14	"Close Encounters of the Third Down"	Peter Bonerz	Scott Spencer Gorden	January 9, 1991
79	15	"Flashbacks"	Jonathan Debin	Bruce Kirschbaum	January 16, 1991
80	16	"Championship Game"	Peter Bonerz	Larry Balmagia	January 23, 1991

== Syndication and home media ==
At the height of the O. J. Simpson murder case, the show made its way to syndicated reruns. The complete series was released on DVD on January 24, 2006.

The original HBO versions ran for 30 minutes, while the edited-for-syndication versions ran for 22 minutes, and had some dialog and scenes edited for content, as well as the addition of a laugh-track. The majority of episodes on the "Complete Collection" DVD are the syndicated versions.

The original opening credits showed former professional football player Fran Tarkenton introducing the players and the plot points at the beginning of each episode. Completely different closing credits were originally used, too. They showed credits rolling over scenes from the episode. In syndication, these were replaced with later opening credits featuring Miracle Miles Coolidge (even though he did not join the cast until the last season) and a generic "Copyright 1991" disclaimer on a blue background respectively.

== In popular culture ==
- Outtake promos for the "championship" season with OJ and Marcus Allen were featured in the 2016 Oscar-winning documentary OJ: Made in America.
