= Concrete Cowboys =

1979 TV film

- DVD cover
- Genre: Adventure
- Written by: Jimmy Sangster
- Directed by: Burt Kennedy
- Starring: Jerry Reed; Tom Selleck
- Country of origin: United States
- Original language: English

Production
- Executive producer: Ernie Frankel
- Producer: Richard Newton
- Production locations: Union Station, Nashville, Tennessee
- Cinematography: Alan Stensvold
- Editor: Art Seid
- Running time: 100 minutes
- Production company: Frankel Films

Original release
- Network: CBS
- Release: October 17, 1979

Concrete Cowboys is a 1979 American Western television pilot film starring Jerry Reed and Tom Selleck, directed by Burt Kennedy. It was broadcast on CBS on October 17, 1979. It was followed in 1981 by a television series starring Reed and Geoffrey Scott with the same title.

== Television pilot (film) ==
The film is also known as Highway Action (in Finland), Nashville detective (in Italy) and Ramblin' Man, the latter under which it was released on video by a few companies, including Edde Entertainment.

=== Plot ===
Will Eubanks (Tom Selleck) and his rowdy gambling buddy J.D. Reed (Jerry Reed) are two good-time roustabouts. After being caught in a sting card game, the two men are forced to leave town in a hurry. Hopping on a freight train, they end up in Nashville and, mistaken for detectives, they are hired to locate a singer (Morgan Fairchild) who has mysteriously disappeared. By the time they realize this game is more than either one of them can handle, they are embroiled in an intricate blackmail scheme with deadly results.

=== Cast ===
- Jerry Reed as J.D. Reed
- Tom Selleck as Will Eubanks
- Morgan Fairchild as Kate / Carla
- Claude Akins as Woody Stone
- Roy Acuff as Himself
- Barbara Mandrell as Herself
- Ray Stevens as Himself
- Lucille Benson as Peg the Madam
- Gene Evans as Lt. Blocker
- Randy Powell as Lonnie Grimes
- Red West as Sheriff
- Grace Zabriskie as Mrs. Barnaby
- Bob Hannah as Mr. Barnaby (Wax Museum)
- Joseph Burke as Hatcheck, Casino owner
- Seidina Reed as Singer on Cumberland Queen

=== Soundtrack ===
- Jerry Reed – "Breakin' Loose"
- Ray Stevens – "Shriner's Convention"

== Television series ==
Concrete Cowboys
- Created by: Ernie Frankel; Richard Newton
- Starring: Jerry Reed; Geoffrey Scott
- Opening theme: "Breakin' Loose" performed by Jerry Reed
- Composer: Jerry Reed
- Country of origin: United States
- Original language: English
- No. of seasons: 1
- No. of episodes: 6 (1 Unaired)

Production
- Executive producer: Ernie Frankel
- Running time: 60 minutes
- Production company: Frankel Productions

Original release
- Network: CBS
- Release: February 7 – March 21, 1981

A 1981 TV series based on the film and sharing its title, with Reed reprising his role as J.D. Reed and Geoffrey Scott taking over Tom Selleck's role as Will Eubanks, was broadcast on CBS from February 7 to March 21, 1981 and cancelled after six episodes.

== Cast ==
- Jerry Reed as J.D. Reed
- Geoffrey Scott as Will Eubanks

== Episodes ==
No.	Title	Directed by	Written by	Original release date
1	"Eldorado"	Leo Penn	Robert Foster	February 7, 1981
2	"Everything Is Relative"	Unknown	Unknown	February 14, 1981
3	"On the Run"	Leo Penn	Eugene Price	February 21, 1981
4	"The Wind Bags"	Leo Penn	Jimmy Sangster	February 28, 1981
5	"Two Hundred Miles from No Place"	Lawrence Dobkin	Jimmy Sangster	March 14, 1981
6	"A Token for Winnie"	Lawrence Dobkin	Robert W. Lenski	March 21, 1981
n–a	"Running Home"	TBA	TBA	TBA
