= Geoffrey Scott (actor) =

American actor (1942–2021)

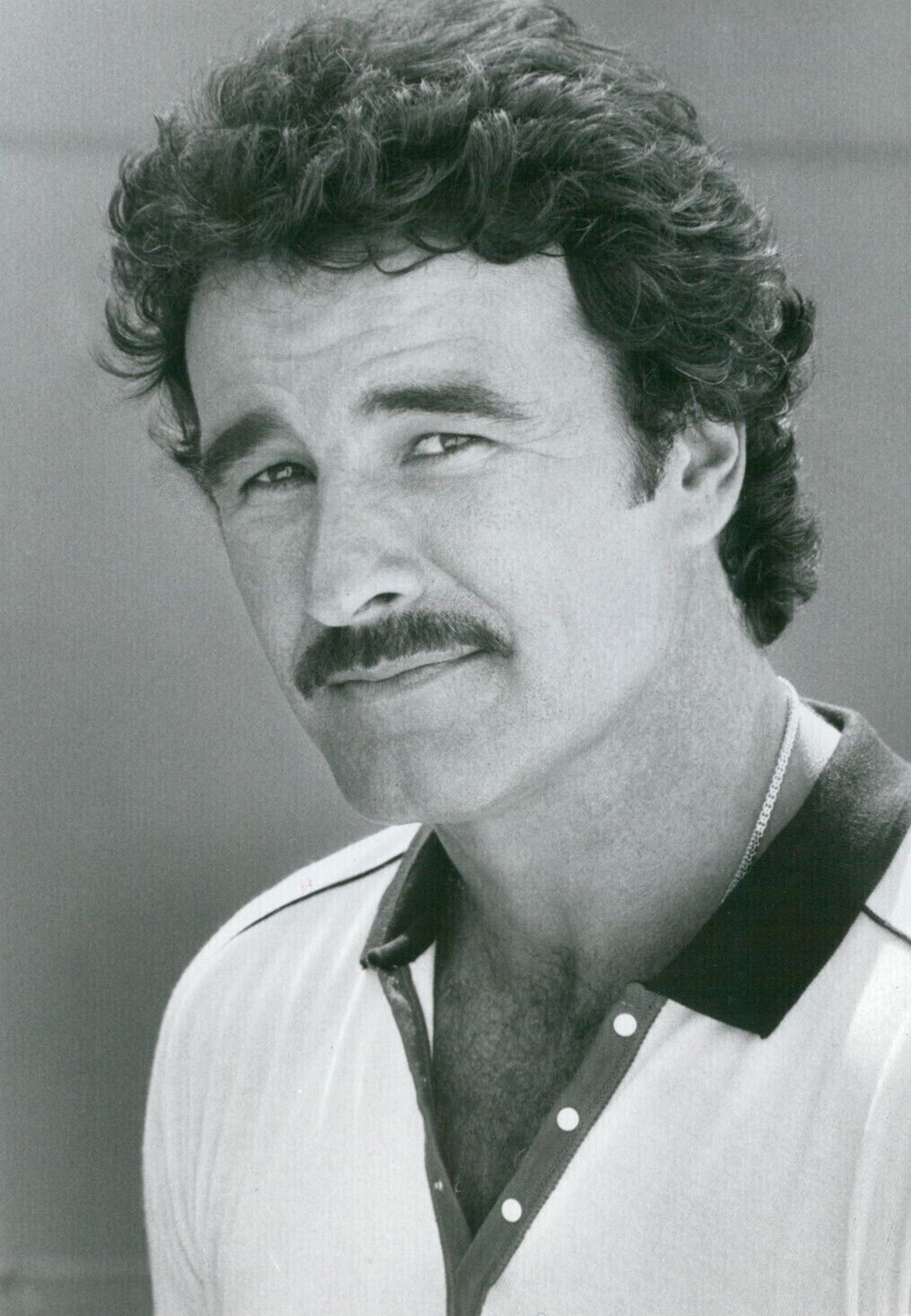
- Scott in Dynasty (1982)
- Born: Geoffrey Chase Scott; February 22, 1942; Hollywood, California, U.S.
- Died: February 23, 2021 (aged 79); Broomfield, Colorado, U.S.
- Occupation: Actor
- Years active: 1961-2005
- Known for: role as Mark Jennings on the ABC TV series Dynasty
- Spouses: Tanya Thompson (m. 1960; div. 1962); Carol Englehart (m. 1975; div. 1988); Cheri Catherine Scott (m. 1993)
- Children: 2

Geoffrey Chase Scott (February 22, 1942 – February 23, 2021) was an American actor and stuntman best known for appearing on the television series Dynasty as Mark Jennings.

== Early years ==
Geoffrey Scott was born on February 22, 1942, in Hollywood, California. His parents were Reed (a manager with Lockheed) and Jayne (a housewife), and he had a brother, Don.

== Career ==
Scott appeared on numerous daytime soap operas, playing Sky Rumson on Dark Shadows in 1970, Jeffrey Jordan on Where the Heart Is in 1972, David McAllister on General Hospital in 1989, and Billy Lewis on Guiding Light in 1994. Scott had a leading role in the sitcom 1st & Ten in the 1980s, was featured in almost 100 television commercials and guest-starred on many series from the 1970s through the 1990s. Other nighttime series regular contracts included Concrete Cowboys and Cliffhangers. In film, he co-starred with Jane Fonda in The Morning After. His last acting role before retirement was in the film Hulk.

== Personal life ==
Scott married Tanya Thompson in 1960; they divorced in 1962. He married producer Carol Engelhart Scott in 1975, and they divorced in 1988. Also in 1988, Scott was involved in a serious accident when he was pinned between two cars while riding a bicycle. Both of his legs were crushed, but he went on to make a full recovery. Scott later lived in Colorado with his third wife, Cheri Catherine, whom he married in 1993, and their twin sons Christopher and Matthew.

== Death ==
Scott died of Parkinson's disease in Broomfield, Colorado, on February 23, 2021, a day after his 79th birthday.

== Filmography ==
=== Film ===
Year	Title	Role	Notes
1986	The Morning After	Bobby Korshack	
1991	Under Crystal Lake	Josh Lewis	
2003	Hulk	President	

=== Television ===
Year	Title	Role	Notes
1970	Dark Shadows	Sky Rumson	15 episodes
1972	Where the Heart Is	Jeffrey Jordan	Daytime serial
1972-1973	Cannon	Doorman	3 episodes
1974	Houston, We've Got a Problem	Mel Anderson	Television movie
1974	Adam-12	Mr. Payne	Episode: "L.A. International"
1974	Nourish the Beast	Studley	Television movie
1974	ABC's Wide World of Mystery	Pub Manager	Episode: "Death Is a Bad Trip"
1974	Kojak	Johnny Bishop	2 episodes
1975	Harry O	Will Hawkins	Episode: "Group Terror"
1976	The Dark Side of Innocence	Tony	Television movie
1977	Dog and Cat	David Storey	Episode: "Pilot"
1977	Dog and Cat	David Storey	Television movie
1979	Barnaby Jones	Henry Scott	Episode: "A Desperate Pursuit"
1979	The Secret Empire	Marshall Jim Donner	Episodes: "The Secret Empire"
1980	Dallas	Cowboy	Episode: "The Wheeler Dealer"
1981	Concrete Cowboys	Will Eubanks	Series regular (7 episodes)
1982-1984	Dynasty	Mark Jennings	Series regular (45 episodes)
1983	Fantasy Island	Gary Tucker	Episode: "Second Time Around/Three's a Crowd"
1983	The Love Boat	Phil Howard	Episode: "Dee Dee's Dilemma/Julie's Blind Date/The Prize Winner"
1984	It's Your Move	Jack Wolf	Episode: "The Rival"
1984	Hotel	Hal Dryer	Episode: "Vantage Point"
1984-1985	1st & Ten	Bob Dorsey	Series regular (13 episodes)
1985	Matt Houston	Ted Peterson/Jphn Logan	Episode: "The Beach Club Murders"
1985	Night Court	David Towers	Episode: "Billie's Valentine"
1985	Glitter	Jeremy Tyler	Episode: "The Tribute"
1986	The Love Boat	John Jackson	Episode: "My Stepmother, Myself/Almost Roommates/Cornerback Sneak"
1986	Webster	Jed Hammond	Episode: "Kiss Me Kate"
1987	Married... with Children	Gary	Episode: "Where's the Boss?"
1987	Hooperman	Vinnie Corral	Episode: "Don We Now Our Gay Apparel"
1988	She's the Sheriff	Danny	Episode: "Hildy's First Kiss"
1989	Murder, She Wrote	Lt. Turner	Episode: "Prediction Murder"
1989	General Hospital	David McAllister	23 episodes
1991	P.S. I Luv U	Stunt Coordinator	Episode: "I'd Kill to Direct"
1992	FBI: The Untold Stories	Garrett Trapnell	Episode: "Lady Skyjacker"
1992	Baywatch	Jed	2 episodes
1993	Murphy Brown	Bart	Episode: "Back to the Ball"
1993-1994	Guiding Light	Harlan “Billy” Lewis II #2	2 episodes

=== Theatre ===
Year	Title	Role	Notes
1970	Lulu	Unknown role	Sheridan Square Playhouse
