= List of Dynasty (1981 TV series) episodes =

Dynasty is an American prime time television soap opera that aired on ABC from January 12, 1981, to May 11, 1989. The series, created by Richard and Esther Shapiro and produced by Aaron Spelling, revolves around the Carringtons, a wealthy family residing in Denver, Colorado. Dynasty stars John Forsythe as oil magnate Blake Carrington, Linda Evans as his new wife Krystle, and later Joan Collins as his former wife Alexis.

Dynasty was conceived as ABC's competitor to CBS's prime time series Dallas. Ratings for the show's first season were unimpressive, but a revamp for the second season that included the arrival of Collins as scheming Alexis saw ratings enter the top 20. By the fall of 1982, it was a top 10 show, and by the spring of 1985, it was the #1 show in the United States. The series declined considerably in popularity during its final two seasons, and it was ultimately cancelled in the spring of 1989 after nine seasons and 220 episodes. A two-part miniseries, Dynasty: The Reunion, aired in October 1991.

Season one of Dynasty was delayed by the 1980 Screen Actors Guild strike, season two by the 1981 Writers Guild of America strike, and season nine by the 1988 Writers Guild of America strike.

NOTE: The Production Codes were taken from the United States Copyright Office.

== Series overview ==
Season	Episodes	Originally released		Rank	Rating	Ref.
Season	Episodes	First released	Last released	Rank	Rating	Ref.
1	15	January 12, 1981	April 20, 1981	#28 (tied)	19.0	
2	22	November 11, 1981	May 5, 1982	#19	20.2	
3	24	October 27, 1982	April 20, 1983	#5	22.4	
4	27	September 28, 1983	May 9, 1984	#3	24.1	
5	29	September 26, 1984	May 15, 1985	#1	25.0	
6	31	September 25, 1985	May 21, 1986	#7	21.8	
7	28	September 24, 1986	May 6, 1987	#24	17.2	
8	22	September 23, 1987	March 30, 1988	#41	14.3	
9	22	November 3, 1988	May 11, 1989	#69	10.5	
The Reunion	2	October 20, 1991	October 22, 1991	#15 (Part 1) #17 (Part 2)	16.8; 15.3	

== Episodes ==
=== Season 1 (1981) ===
No. overall	No. in season	Title	Directed by	Written by	Original release date	Prod. code	Rating/share (households)
1	1	"Oil"	Ralph Senensky	Richard and Esther Shapiro	January 12, 1981	S-001	22.2/32
2	2	"Oil"	Ralph Senensky	Richard and Esther Shapiro	January 12, 1981	S-001	22.2/32
3	3	"Oil"	Ralph Senensky	Richard and Esther Shapiro	January 12, 1981	S-001	22.2/32
4	4	"The Honeymoon"	Robert C. Thompson	Story by : Chester Krumholz; Teleplay by : Edward De Blasio & Chester Krumholz	January 19, 1981	S-002	21.0/30
5	5	"The Dinner Party"	Don Medford	Chester Krumholz	January 26, 1981	S-003	18.4/26
6	6	"Fallon's Wedding"	Philip Leacock	Story by : Richard Shapiro; Teleplay by : Edward De Blasio & Norman Katkov	February 2, 1981	S-004	20.4/28
7	7	"The Chauffeur Tells a Secret"	Ralph Senensky	Edward De Blasio	February 16, 1981	S-005	16.0/23
8	8	"The Bordello"	Philip Leacock	Edward De Blasio	February 23, 1981	S-006	15.4/22
9	9	"Krystle's Lie"	Don Medford	Edward De Blasio	March 2, 1981	S-007	18.7/29
10	10	"The Necklace"	Philip Leacock	Edward De Blasio	March 2, 1981	S-008	18.7/29
11	11	"The Beating"	Don Medford	Edward De Blasio	March 9, 1981	S-009	17.5/26
12	12	"The Birthday Party"	Burt Brinckerhoff	Edward De Blasio and Richard Shapiro	March 16, 1981	S-010	18.3/28
13	13	"The Separation"	Gabrielle Beaumont	Edward De Blasio	March 23, 1981	S-011	17.9/26
14	14	"Blake Goes to Jail"	Don Medford	Edward De Blasio	April 13, 1981	S-012	16.3/25
15	15	"The Testimony"	Don Medford	Edward De Blasio	April 20, 1981	S-013	18.5/28

=== Season 2 (1981–82) ===
No. overall	No. in season	Title	Directed by	Written by	Original release date	Prod. code	Rating/share (households)
16	1	"Enter Alexis"	Gabrielle Beaumont	Story by : Eileen Mason and Robert Pollock; Teleplay by : Edward De Blasio	November 11, 1981	S-014	18.8/32
17	2	"The Verdict"	Gabrielle Beaumont	Story by : Eileen Mason and Robert Pollock; Teleplay by : Edward De Blasio	November 18, 1981	S-015	22.7/39
18	3	"Alexis' Secret"	Richard Kinon	Story by : Eileen Mason and Robert Pollock; Teleplay by : Edward De Blasio	November 25, 1981	S-016	17.7/31
19	4	"Fallon's Father"	Bob Sweeney	Story by : Eileen Mason and Robert Pollock; Teleplay by : Mann Rubin	December 2, 1981	S-017	20.9/35
20	5	"Reconciliation"	Jerome Courtland	Story by : Eileen Mason and Robert Pollock; Teleplay by : Edward De Blasio	December 9, 1981	S-018	18.5/31
21	6	"Viva Las Vegas"	Alf Kjellin	Story by : Eileen Mason and Robert Pollock; Teleplay by : Edward De Blasio	December 16, 1981	S-019	18.5/30
22	7	"The Miscarriage"	Irving J. Moore	Story by : Eileen Mason and Robert Pollock; Teleplay by : Edward De Blasio	December 23, 1981	S-020	17.3/32
23	8	"The Mid-East Meeting"	Gabrielle Beaumont	Story by : Eileen Mason and Robert Pollock; Teleplay by : Elisabeth & Richard Wilson	January 6, 1982	S-021	18.5/29
24	9	"The Psychiatrist"	Irving J. Moore	Story by : Eileen Mason and Robert Pollock; Teleplay by : Shimon Wincelberg	January 13, 1982	S-022	20.7/32
25	10	"Sammy Jo and Steven Marry"	Jerome Courtland	Story by : Eileen Mason and Robert Pollock; Teleplay by : Edward De Blasio	January 20, 1982	S-023	19.4/32
26	11	"The Car Explosion"	Irving J. Moore	Story by : Eileen Mason and Robert Pollock; Teleplay by : Edward De Blasio	January 27, 1982	S-024	20.3/34
27	12	"Blake's Blindness"	Jeff Bleckner	Story by : Eileen Mason and Robert Pollock; Teleplay by : Lorraine Despres	February 3, 1982	S-025	19.6/32
28	13	"The Hearing"	Bob Sweeney	Story by : Eileen Mason and Robert Pollock; Teleplay by : Shimon Wincelberg	February 10, 1982	S-026	19.7/32
29	14	"The Iago Syndrome"	Jerome Courtland & Alf Kjellin	Story by : Eileen Mason and Robert Pollock; Teleplay by : Shimon Wincelberg	February 17, 1982	S-027	21.3/35
30	15	"The Party"	Gwen Arner	Story by : Eileen Mason and Robert Pollock; Teleplay by : Edward De Blasio	February 24, 1982	S-028	21.0/34
31	16	"The Baby"	Jerome Courtland	Story by : Eileen Mason and Robert Pollock; Teleplay by : Edward De Blasio	March 3, 1982	S-029	21.8/35
32	17	"Mother and Son"	Lawrence Dobkin	Story by : Eileen Mason and Robert Pollock; Teleplay by : Edward De Blasio	March 17, 1982	S-030	23.0/41
33	18	"The Gun"	Philip Leacock	Story by : Eileen Mason and Robert Pollock; Teleplay by : Edward De Blasio	March 24, 1982	S-031	23.7/42
34	19	"The Fragment"	Irving J. Moore & Edward Ledding	Story by : Eileen Mason and Robert Pollock; Teleplay by : Edward De Blasio	April 7, 1982	S-032	21.0/35
35	20	"The Shakedown"	Philip Leacock	Story by : Eileen Mason and Robert Pollock; Teleplay by : Daniel King Benton	April 14, 1982	S-033	20.8/36
36	21	"The Two Princes"	Irving J. Moore	Story by : Eileen Mason and Robert Pollock; Teleplay by : Edward De Blasio	April 28, 1982	S-034	21.4/35
37	22	"The Cliff"	Jerome Courtland	Story by : Eileen Mason and Robert Pollock; Teleplay by : Edward De Blasio	May 5, 1982	S-035	22.7/38

=== Season 3 (1982–83) ===
No. overall	No. in season	Title	Directed by	Written by	Original release date	Prod. code	Rating/share (households)
38	1	"The Plea"	Irving J. Moore	Story by : Eileen and Robert Mason Pollock; Teleplay by : Edward De Blasio	October 27, 1982	DY-036	25.6/43
39	2	"The Roof"	Gwen Arner	Story by : Eileen and Robert Mason Pollock; Teleplay by : Edward De Blasio	November 3, 1982	DY-037	23.2/40
40	3	"The Wedding"	Irving J. Moore	Story by : Eileen and Robert Mason Pollock; Teleplay by : Jeffery Lane	November 10, 1982	DY-038	25.8/43
41	4	"The Will"	Gwen Arner	Story by : Eileen Mason and Robert Pollock; Teleplay by : Katherine Coker	November 17, 1982	DY-039	19.6/31
42	5	"The Siblings"	Irving J. Moore	Story by : Eileen Mason and Robert Pollock; Teleplay by : Daniel King Benton	November 24, 1982	DY-040	19.1/32
43	6	"Mark"	Philip Leacock	Story by : Eileen Mason and Robert Pollock; Teleplay by : Edward De Blasio	December 1, 1982	DY-041	20.6/32
44	7	"Kirby"	Irving J. Moore	Story by : Eileen Mason and Robert Pollock; Teleplay by : Edward De Blasio	December 8, 1982	DY-042	21.2/35
45	8	"La Mirage"	Irving J. Moore	Story by : Eileen Mason and Robert Pollock; Teleplay by : Stephen Black & Henry Stern	December 15, 1982	DY-043	21.3/35
46	9	"Acapulco"	Philip Leacock	Story by : Eileen Mason and Robert Pollock; Teleplay by : Leah Markus	December 22, 1982	DY-044	21.5/36
47	10	"The Locket"	Jerome Courtland	Story by : Eileen Mason and Robert Pollock; Teleplay by : Dick Nelson	December 29, 1982	DY-045	19.3/32
48	11	"The Search"	Alf Kjellin	Story by : Eileen Mason and Robert Pollock; Teleplay by : Edward De Blasio	January 5, 1983	DY-046	22.5/40
49	12	"Samantha"	Bob Sweeney	Story by : Eileen Mason and Robert Pollock; Teleplay by : Edward De Blasio	January 12, 1983	DY-047	22.9/37
50	13	"Danny"	Alf Kjellin	Story by : Eileen Mason and Robert Pollock; Teleplay by : Dick Nelson	January 19, 1983	DY-048	21.8/35
51	14	"Madness"	Irving J. Moore	Story by : Eileen Mason and Robert Pollock; Teleplay by : Stephen Kandel	January 26, 1983	DY-049	26.3/40
52	15	"Two Flights to Haiti"	Jerome Courtland	Story by : Eileen and Robert Mason Pollock; Teleplay by : Edward De Blasio	February 2, 1983	DY-050	24.3/37
53	16	"The Mirror"	Philip Leacock	Story by : Eileen Mason and Robert Pollock; Teleplay by : Edward De Blasio	February 16, 1983	DY-051	20.9/36
54	17	"Battle Lines"	Jerome Courtland	Story by : Eileen Mason and Robert Pollock; Teleplay by : Dick Nelson	February 23, 1983	DY-052	21.5/34
55	18	"Reunion in Singapore"	Gwen Arner	Story by : Eileen Mason and Robert Pollock; Teleplay by : Edward De Blasio	March 2, 1983	DY-053	22.5/27
56	19	"Fathers and Sons"	Jerome Courtland	Story by : Eileen Mason and Robert Pollock; Teleplay by : Edward De Blasio	March 9, 1983	DY-054	25.2/43
57	20	"The Downstairs Bride"	Philip Leacock	Story by : Eileen Mason and Robert Pollock; Teleplay by : Dick Nelson	March 16, 1983	DY-055	22.0/35
58	21	"The Vote"	Glynn R. Turman	Story by : Eileen Mason and Robert Pollock; Teleplay by : Edward De Blasio	March 23, 1983	DY-056	24.6/46
59	22	"The Dinner"	Philip Leacock	Story by : Eileen and Robert Mason Pollock; Teleplay by : Edward De Blasio	April 6, 1983	DY-057	22.5/38
60	23	"The Threat"	Bob Sweeney	Story by : Eileen Mason and Robert Pollock; Teleplay by : Edward De Blasio	April 13, 1983	DY-058	23.2/39
61	24	"The Cabin"	Irving J. Moore	Story by : Eileen and Robert Mason Pollock; Teleplay by : Edward De Blasio	April 20, 1983	DY-059	27.3/45

=== Season 4 (1983–84) ===
No. overall	No. in season	Title	Directed by	Written by	Original release date	Prod. code	Rating/share (households)
62	1	"The Arrest"	Irving J. Moore	Story by : Eileen and Robert Mason Pollock; Teleplay by : Edward De Blasio	September 28, 1983	DY-060	27.2/41
63	2	"The Bungalow"	Alf Kjellin	Story by : Eileen and Robert Mason Pollock; Teleplay by : Edward De Blasio	October 5, 1983	DY-061	22.5/35
64	3	"The Note"	Jerome Courtland	Story by : Eileen and Robert Mason Pollock; Teleplay by : Edward De Blasio	October 19, 1983	DY-062	25.0/40
65	4	"The Hearing - Part 1"	Robert Scheerer	Story by : Eileen and Robert Mason Pollock; Teleplay by : Dennis Turner	October 26, 1983	DY-063	22.9/36
66	5	"The Hearing - Part 2"	Irving J. Moore	Story by : Eileen and Robert Mason Pollock; Teleplay by : Edward De Blasio	November 2, 1983	DY-064	22.1/33
67	6	"Tender Comrades"	Philip Leacock	Story by : Eileen and Robert Mason Pollock; Teleplay by : Edward De Blasio	November 9, 1983	DY-065	23.8/35
68	7	"Tracy"	Philip Leacock	Story by : Eileen and Robert Mason Pollock; Teleplay by : Edward De Blasio	November 16, 1983	DY-066	20.6/30
69	8	"Dex"	Lorraine Senna Ferrara	Story by : Eileen and Robert Mason Pollock; Teleplay by : Dennis Turner	November 23, 1983	DY-067	21.3/33
70	9	"Peter De Vilbis"	Jerome Courtland	Story by : Eileen and Robert Mason Pollock; Teleplay by : Edward De Blasio	November 30, 1983	DY-068	24.4/36
71	10	"The Proposal"	Curtis Harrington	Story by : Eileen and Robert Mason Pollock; Teleplay by : Dennis Turner	December 7, 1983	DY-069	25.7/39
72	11	"Carousel"	Philip Leacock	Story by : Eileen and Robert Mason Pollock; Teleplay by : Edward De Blasio	December 21, 1983	DY-070	23.8/36
73	12	"The Wedding"	Irving J. Moore	Story by : Eileen and Robert Mason Pollock; Teleplay by : Michael Russnow	December 28, 1983	DY-071	26.0/39
74	13	"The Ring"	Curtis Harrington	Story by : Eileen and Robert Mason Pollock; Teleplay by : Dennis Turner	January 4, 1984	DY-072	23.9/35
75	14	"Lancelot"	Irving J. Moore	Story by : Eileen and Robert Mason Pollock; Teleplay by : Milee Taggart	January 11, 1984	DY-073	25.7/38
76	15	"Seizure"	Georg Stanford Brown	Story by : Eileen and Robert Mason Pollock; Teleplay by : Dennis Turner	January 18, 1984	DY-074	24.8/36
77	16	"A Little Girl"	Irving J. Moore	Story by : Eileen and Robert Mason Pollock; Teleplay by : Edward De Blasio	February 1, 1984	DY-075	25.4/38
78	17	"The Accident"	Jerome Courtland	Story by : Eileen and Robert Mason Pollock; Teleplay by : Priscilla English	February 22, 1984	DY-076	23.8/36
79	18	"The Vigil"	Philip Leacock	Story by : Eileen and Robert Mason Pollock; Teleplay by : Dennis Turner and Michael Russnow	February 29, 1984	DY-077	24.2/36
80	19	"Steps"	Irving J. Moore	Story by : Eileen and Robert Mason Pollock; Teleplay by : Dennis Turner	March 7, 1984	DY-078	25.9/39
81	20	"The Voice - Part 1"	Georg Stanford Brown	Story by : Eileen and Robert Mason Pollock; Teleplay by : Edward De Blasio	March 14, 1984	DY-079	24.6/38
82	21	"The Voice - Part 2"	Jerome Courtland	Story by : Eileen and Robert Mason Pollock; Teleplay by : Edward De Blasio	March 21, 1984	DY-080	25.1/39
83	22	"The Voice - Part 3"	Irving J. Moore	Story by : Eileen and Robert Mason Pollock; Teleplay by : Edward De Blasio	March 28, 1984	DY-081	25.2/39
84	23	"The Birthday"	Kim Friedman	Story by : Eileen and Robert Mason Pollock; Teleplay by : Susan Miller	April 4, 1984	DY-082	23.6/38
85	24	"The Check"	Jerome Courtland	Story by : Eileen and Robert Mason Pollock; Teleplay by : Dennis Turner	April 11, 1984	DY-083	21.6/38
86	25	"The Engagement"	Irving J. Moore	Story by : Eileen and Robert Mason Pollock; Teleplay by : Dennis Turner	April 25, 1984	DY-084	23.3/37
87	26	"New Lady in Town"	Jerome Courtland	Story by : Eileen and Robert Mason Pollock; Teleplay by : Edward De Blasio	May 2, 1984	DY-085	25.2/38
88	27	"The Nightmare"	Irving J. Moore	Story by : Eileen and Robert Mason Pollock; Teleplay by : Edward De Blasio	May 9, 1984	DY-086	25.7/38

=== Season 5 (1984–85) ===
No. overall	No. in season	Title	Directed by	Written by	Original release date	Prod. code	Rating/share (households)
89	1	"Disappearance"	Irving J. Moore	Story by : Camille Marchetta; Teleplay by : Edward De Blasio	September 26, 1984	DY-087	22.2/34
90	2	"The Mortgage"	Jerome Courtland	Story by : Camille Marchetta; Teleplay by : Dennis Turner	October 10, 1984	DY-088	25.1/36
91	3	"Fallon"	Gwen Arner	Story by : Camille Marchetta; Teleplay by : Edward De Blasio	October 17, 1984	DY-089	26.1/40
92	4	"The Rescue"	Irving J. Moore	Story by : Camille Marchetta; Teleplay by : Dennis Turner	October 24, 1984	DY-090	26.3/39
93	5	"The Trial"	Gwen Arner	Story by : Joel Steiger; Teleplay by : Paul Savage	October 31, 1984	DY-091	24.9/39
94	6	"The Verdict"	Jerome Courtland	Story by : Camille Marchetta and Joel Steiger; Teleplay by : Stephen and Elinor Karpf	November 7, 1984	DY-092	25.7/39
95	7	"Amanda"	Irving J. Moore	Story by : Camille Marchetta & Joel Steiger; Teleplay by : Edward De Blasio	November 14, 1984	DY-093	23.5/35
96	8	"The Secret"	Jerome Courtland	Story by : Camille Marchetta; Teleplay by : Dennis Turner	November 21, 1984	DY-094	24.3/38
97	9	"Domestic Intrigue"	Irving J. Moore	Story by : Camille Marchetta & Joel Steiger; Teleplay by : Edward De Blasio	November 28, 1984	DY-095	25.2/38
98	10	"Krystina"	Jerome Courtland	Story by : Camille Marchetta; Teleplay by : Will Lorin	December 5, 1984	DY-096	25.3/37
99	11	"Swept Away"	Irving J. Moore	Story by : Camille Marchetta; Teleplay by : Dennis Turner	December 12, 1984	DY-097	26.5/39
100	12	"That Holiday Spirit"	Curtis Harrington	Story by : Camille Marchetta & Susan Baskin; Teleplay by : Edward De Blasio	December 19, 1984	DY-098	25.9/40
101	13	"The Avenger"	Irving J. Moore	Story by : Camille Marchetta & Susan Baskin; Teleplay by : Dennis Turner	January 2, 1985	DY-099	26.2/38
102	14	"The Will"	Nancy Malone	Story by : Camille Marchetta & Susan Baskin; Teleplay by : Noreen Stone	January 9, 1985	DY-100	27.7/40
103	15	"The Treasure"	Curtis Harrington	Story by : Camille Marchetta & Susan Baskin; Teleplay by : Stephen & Elinor Karpf	January 16, 1985	DY-101	27.0/39
104	16	"Foreign Relations"	Kim Friedman	Story by : Camille Marchetta & Susan Baskin; Teleplay by : Edward De Blasio	January 23, 1985	DY-102	25.0/37
105	17	"Triangles"	Irving J. Moore	Story by : Camille Marchetta & Susan Baskin; Teleplay by : Dennis Turner	January 30, 1985	DY-103	27.0/39
106	18	"The Ball"	Jerome Courtland	Story by : Camille Marchetta & Susan Baskin; Teleplay by : John Pleshette	February 6, 1985	DY-104	25.9/41
107	19	"Circumstantial Evidence"	Curtis Harrington	Story by : Camille Marchetta & Donald R. Boyle; Teleplay by : Edward De Blasio	February 13, 1985	DY-105	23.4/34
108	20	"The Collapse"	John Patterson	Story by : Camille Marchetta & Donald R. Boyle; Teleplay by : Donald R. Boyle	February 20, 1985	DY-106	24.6/35
109	21	"Life and Death"	Irving J. Moore	Story by : Camille Marchetta & Donald R. Boyle; Teleplay by : Dennis Turner	February 27, 1985	DY-107	24.8/37
110	22	"Parental Consent"	Kim Friedman	Story by : Camille Marchetta & Donald R. Boyle; Teleplay by : Edward De Blasio	March 6, 1985	DY-108	24.8/36
111	23	"Photo Finish"	Robert Scheerer	Story by : Camille Marchetta & Donald R. Boyle; Teleplay by : Susan Miller	March 13, 1985	DY-109	24.2/36
112	24	"The Crash"	Irving J. Moore	Story by : Camille Marchetta; Teleplay by : Dennis Turner	March 20, 1985	DY-110	22.6/35
113	25	"Reconciliation"	Nancy Malone	Story by : Camille Marchetta; Teleplay by : Edward De Blasio	March 27, 1985	DY-111	23.1/35
114	26	"Sammy Jo"	Irving J. Moore	Story by : Camille Marchetta & Susan Baskin; Teleplay by : Dennis Turner	April 3, 1985	DY-112	23.1/35
115	27	"Kidnapped"	Jerome Courtland	Story by : Camille Marchetta & Susan Baskin; Teleplay by : Dennis Turner	April 10, 1985	DY-113	24.5/37
116	28	"The Heiress"	Irving J. Moore	Story by : Camille Marchetta & Susan Baskin; Teleplay by : Edward De Blasio	May 8, 1985	DY-114	21.9/33
117	29	"Royal Wedding"	Jerome Courtland	Story by : Camille Marchetta & Susan Baskin; Teleplay by : Edward De Blasio	May 15, 1985	DY-115	25.9/39

=== Season 6 (1985–86) ===
The Colbys was spun off Dynasty during season six.

No. overall	No. in season	Title	Directed by	Written by	Original release date	Prod. code	Rating/share (households)
118	1	"The Aftermath"	Robert Scheerer	Story by : Diana Gould; Teleplay by : Edward De Blasio	September 25, 1985	DY-116	28.1/42
119	2	"The Homecoming"	Kim Friedman	Story by : Diana Gould; Teleplay by : Dennis Turner	October 2, 1985	DY-117	23.4/35
120	3	"The Californians"	Gwen Arner	Story by : Diana Gould; Teleplay by : Edward De Blasio	October 9, 1985	DY-118	22.5/34
121	4	"The Man"	Don Medford	Story by : Diana Gould & Scott M. Hamner; Teleplay by : Dennis Turner	October 16, 1985	DY-119	20.6/31
122	5	"The Gown"	Robert Scheerer	Story by : Diana Gould & Scott M. Hamner; Teleplay by : Dennis Turner	October 30, 1985	DY-120	22.0/33
123	6	"The Titans: Part 1 & 2"	Irving J. Moore	Story by : Diana Gould & Scott M. Hamner; Teleplay by : Edward De Blasio	November 13, 1985	DY-121	24.2/37
124	7	"The Titans: Part 1 & 2"	Irving J. Moore	Story by : Diana Gould & Scott M. Hamner; Teleplay by : Edward De Blasio	November 13, 1985	DY-121	24.2/37
125	8	"The Decision"	Gwen Arner	Story by : Diana Gould & Scott M. Hamner; Teleplay by : Robert Seidenberg	November 20, 1985	DY-122	22.4/32
126	9	"The Proposal"	Robert Scheerer	Story by : Diana Gould & Scott M. Hamner; Teleplay by : Edward De Blasio	November 27, 1985	DY-123	20.6/34
127	10	"The Close Call"	Irving J. Moore	Story by : Diana Gould & Scott M. Hamner; Teleplay by : Diana Gould	December 4, 1985	DY-124	21.8/32
128	11	"The Quarrels"	Kim Friedman	Story by : Diana Gould & Scott M. Hamner; Teleplay by : Dennis Turner	December 11, 1985	DY-125	21.4/33
129	12	"The Roadhouse"	Jerome Courtland	Story by : Diana Gould & Scott M. Hamner; Teleplay by : Edward De Blasio	December 18, 1985	DY-126	20.0/30
130	13	"The Solution"	Irving J. Moore	Story by : Diana Gould & Scott M. Hamner; Teleplay by : Robert Seidenberg	December 25, 1985	DY-127	17.7/31
131	14	"Suspicions"	Nancy Malone	Story by : Diana Gould & Scott M. Hamner; Teleplay by : Diana Gould	January 8, 1986	DY-128	21.1/31
132	15	"The Alarm"	Kim Friedman	Story by : Diana Gould & Scott M. Hamner; Teleplay by : Edward De Blasio	January 15, 1986	DY-129	20.4/30
133	16	"The Vigil"	Irving J. Moore	Story by : Diana Gould & Scott M. Hamner; Teleplay by : Dennis Turner	January 22, 1986	DY-130	24.2/35
134	17	"The Accident"	Kim Friedman	Story by : Diana Gould & Scott M. Hamner; Teleplay by : Edward De Blasio	January 29, 1986	DY-131	23.9/34
135	18	"Souvenirs"	Robert Scheerer	Story by : Diana Gould & Scott M. Hamner; Teleplay by : Diana Gould	February 5, 1986	DY-132	20.2/30
136	19	"The Divorce"	Irving J. Moore	Story by : Diana Gould & Scott M. Hamner; Teleplay by : Susan Baskin	February 12, 1986	DY-133	22.5/33
137	20	"The Dismissal"	Irving J. Moore	Story by : Diana Gould & Scott M. Hamner; Teleplay by : Dennis Turner	February 19, 1986	DY-134	22.8/33
138	21	"Ben"	Kim Friedman	Story by : Diana Gould & Scott M. Hamner; Teleplay by : Edward De Blasio	February 26, 1986	DY-135	19.8/30
139	22	"Masquerade"	Jerome Courtland	Story by : Diana Gould & Scott M. Hamner; Teleplay by : Robert Seidenberg	March 5, 1986	DY-136	22.0/33
140	23	"The Subpoenas"	Irving J. Moore	Story by : Diana Gould & Scott M. Hamner; Teleplay by : Edward De Blasio	March 12, 1986	DY-137	22.6/34
141	24	"The Trial: Part 1"	Michel Hugo	Story by : Diana Gould & Scott M. Hamner; Teleplay by : Dennis Turner	March 19, 1986	DY-138	21.3/33
142	25	"The Trial: Part 2"	Don Medford	Story by : Diana Gould & Scott M. Hamner; Teleplay by : Dennis Turner	March 26, 1986	DY-139	20.2/31
143	26	"The Vote"	Irving J. Moore	Story by : Diana Gould & Scott M. Hamner; Teleplay by : Edward De Blasio	April 2, 1986	DY-140	21.1/33
144	27	"The Warning"	Don Medford	Story by : Diana Gould & Scott M. Hamner; Teleplay by : Diana Gould	April 9, 1986	DY-141	21.0/33
145	28	"The Cry"	Irving J. Moore	Story by : Diana Gould & Scott M. Hamner; Teleplay by : Scott M. Hamner	April 16, 1986	DY-142	19.2/30
146	29	"The Rescue"	Nancy Malone	Story by : Diana Gould & Scott M. Hamner; Teleplay by : Dennis Turner	April 30, 1986	DY-143	19.5/31
147	30	"The Triple-Cross"	Don Medford	Story by : Diana Gould & Scott M. Hamner; Teleplay by : Diana Gould	May 14, 1986	DY-144	20.5/32
148	31	"The Vendetta"	Irving J. Moore	Story by : Diana Gould & Scott M. Hamner; Teleplay by : Edward De Blasio	May 21, 1986	DY-145	21.9/34

=== Season 7 (1986–87) ===
Season two of The Colbys aired concurrently with Dynasty season seven.

No. overall	No. in season	Title	Directed by	Written by	Original release date	Prod. code	Rating/share (households)
149	1	"The Victory"	Don Medford	Story by : Laurence Heath; Teleplay by : Edward De Blasio	September 24, 1986	DY-146	20.1/31
150	2	"Sideswiped"	Gwen Arner	Story by : Laurence Heath; Teleplay by : Edward De Blasio	October 1, 1986	DY-147	18.7/29
151	3	"Focus"	Don Medford	Story by : Laurence Heath; Teleplay by : James W. Kearns	October 22, 1986	DY-148	17.8/26
152	4	"Reward"	Irving J. Moore	Story by : Laurence Heath; Teleplay by : Harold Stone	October 29, 1986	DY-149	17.0/27
153	5	"The Arraignment"	Georg Stanford Brown	Story by : Laurence Heath; Teleplay by : Dennis Turner	November 5, 1986	DY-150	16.7/25
154	6	"Romance"	Nancy Malone	Story by : Laurence Heath; Teleplay by : Mart Crowley	November 12, 1986	DY-151	16.2/24
155	7	"The Mission"	Don Medford	Story by : Laurence Heath; Teleplay by : Edward De Blasio	November 19, 1986	DY-152	15.6/24
156	8	"The Choice"	Irving J. Moore	Story by : Laurence Heath; Teleplay by : Harold Stone	November 26, 1986	DY-153	15.9/26
157	9	"The Secret"	Don Medford	Story by : Laurence Heath; Teleplay by : Dennis Turner	December 3, 1986	DY-154	16.7/26
158	10	"The Letter"	Georg Stanford Brown	Story by : Laurence Heath; Teleplay by : Edward De Blasio	December 10, 1986	DY-155	17.2/27
159	11	"The Ball"	Nancy Malone	Story by : Laurence Heath; Teleplay by : Edward De Blasio	December 17, 1986	DY-156	16.7/25
160	12	"Fear"	Michel Hugo	Story by : Laurence Heath; Teleplay by : Dennis Turner	December 31, 1986	DY-157	13.7/26
161	13	"The Rig"	Irving J. Moore	Story by : Laurence Heath; Teleplay by : Harold Stone	January 7, 1987	DY-158	18.4/27
162	14	"A Love Remembered - Part 1"	Robert Scheerer	Story by : Laurence Heath; Teleplay by : Edward De Blasio	January 14, 1987	DY-159	18.5/27
163	15	"A Love Remembered - Part 2"	Irving J. Moore	Story by : Laurence Heath; Teleplay by : Edward De Blasio	January 21, 1987	DY-160	19.6/28
164	16	"The Portrait"	Nancy Malone	Story by : Laurence Heath; Teleplay by : Edward De Blasio & Joanna Emerson	January 28, 1987	DY-161	18.9/28
165	17	"The Birthday"	Robert Scheerer	Story by : Laurence Heath; Teleplay by : Dennis Turner	February 4, 1987	DY-162	18.2/28
166	18	"The Test"	Nancy Malone	Story by : Laurence Heath; Teleplay by : Dennis Turner	February 11, 1987	DY-163	17.8/26
167	19	"The Mothers"	Irving J. Moore	Story by : Laurence Heath & Rita Lakin; Teleplay by : Edward De Blasio	February 25, 1987	DY-164	16.9/25
168	20	"The Surgery"	Gwen Arner	Story by : Laurence Heath & Rita Lakin; Teleplay by : Frank V. Furino	March 4, 1987	DY-165	13.7/21
169	21	"The Garage"	Don Medford	Story by : Laurence Heath & Rita Lakin; Teleplay by : Edward De Blasio	March 11, 1987	DY-166	16.5/25
170	22	"The Shower"	Irving J. Moore	Story by : Laurence Heath & Rita Lakin; Teleplay by : Joanna Emerson	March 18, 1987	DY-167	16.8/26
171	23	"The Dress"	Gwen Arner	Story by : Laurence Heath & Rita Lakin; Teleplay by : Frank V. Furino	March 25, 1987	DY-168	18.6/29
172	24	"Valez"	Nancy Malone	Story by : Laurence Heath & Rita Lakin; Teleplay by : Dennis Turner	April 1, 1987	DY-169	16.3/25
173	25	"The Sublet"	Don Medford	Story by : Laurence Heath & Rita Lakin; Teleplay by : Edward De Blasio	April 8, 1987	DY-170	17.4/28
174	26	"The Confession"	Irving J. Moore	Story by : Laurence Heath & Rita Lakin; Teleplay by : A.J. Russel	April 22, 1987	DY-171	16.9/27
175	27	"The Affair"	Don Medford	Story by : Laurence Heath & Rita Lakin; Teleplay by : Frank V. Furino	April 29, 1987	DY-172	16.8/27
176	28	"Shadow Play"	Irving J. Moore	Story by : Laurence Heath & Rita Lakin; Teleplay by : Edward De Blasio	May 6, 1987	DY-173	17.6/29

=== Season 8 (1987–88) ===
No. overall	No. in season	Title	Directed by	Written by	Original release date	Prod. code	Rating/share (households)
177	1	"The Siege - Part 1"	Don Medford	Edward De Blasio	September 23, 1987	DY-174	16.5/28
178	2	"The Siege - Part 2"	Don Medford	Edward De Blasio	September 30, 1987	DY-175	15.2/26
179	3	"The Aftermath"	Irving J. Moore	Story by : Jeff Ryder & Frank V. Furino; Teleplay by : Frank V. Furino	October 7, 1987	DY-176	15.4/26
180	4	"The Announcement"	Don Medford	Story by : Jeff Ryder & Frank V. Furino; Teleplay by : Frank V. Furino	October 14, 1987	DY-177	15.2/26
181	5	"The Surrogate - Part 1"	Nancy Malone	James Harmon Brown & Barbara Esensten	October 28, 1987	DY-178	13.8/25
182	6	"The Surrogate - Part 2"	Don Medford	Barbara Esensten & James Harmon Brown	November 4, 1987	DY-179	14.9/26
183	7	"The Primary"	Irving J. Moore	Story by : Jeff Ryder; Teleplay by : Edward De Blasio	November 18, 1987	DY-180	13.4/24
184	8	"The Testing"	Don Medford	Story by : Jeff Ryder; Teleplay by : Edward De Blasio	November 25, 1987	DY-181	13.3/25
185	9	"The Setup"	Harry Falk	James Harmon Brown & Barbara Esensten	December 2, 1987	DY-182	14.9/26
186	10	"The Fair"	Don Medford	Barbara Esensten & James Harmon Brown	December 9, 1987	DY-183	15.7/28
187	11	"The New Moguls"	Irving J. Moore	Story by : Jeff Ryder; Teleplay by : Frank V. Furino	December 23, 1987	DY-184	11.7/22
188	12	"The Spoiler"	Nancy Malone	Story by : Jeff Ryder; Teleplay by : Frank V. Furino	December 30, 1987	DY-185	13.5/23
189	13	"The Interview"	Don Medford	Story by : Jeff Ryder; Teleplay by : Edward De Blasio	January 6, 1988	DY-186	13.2/22
190	14	"Images"	Harry Falk	Story by : Jeff Ryder; Teleplay by : Edward De Blasio	January 13, 1988	DY-187	14.9/26
191	15	"The Rifle"	Don Medford	Story by : Jeff Ryder; Teleplay by : Frank V. Furino	January 20, 1988	DY-188	16.3/28
192	16	"The Bracelet"	Irving J. Moore	Story by : Jeff Ryder; Teleplay by : Frank V. Furino	January 27, 1988	DY-189	14.4/26
193	17	"The Warning"	Don Medford	James Harmon Brown & Barbara Esensten	February 3, 1988	DY-190	14.9/24
194	18	"Adam's Son"	Nancy Malone	Story by : Jeff Ryder; Teleplay by : Edward De Blasio	February 10, 1988	DY-191	15.0/26
195	19	"The Scandal"	Irving J. Moore	Story by : Jeff Ryder; Teleplay by : Frank V. Furino	March 2, 1988	DY-192	11.1/19
196	20	"The Trial"	Ray Danton	James Harmon Brown & Barbara Esensten	March 9, 1988	DY-193	12.3/21
197	21	"The Proposal"	Don Medford	Story by : Jeff Ryder; Teleplay by : Frank V. Furino	March 16, 1988	DY-194	13.6/24
198	22	"Colorado Roulette"	Irving J. Moore	Story by : Jeff Ryder; Teleplay by : Edward De Blasio	March 30, 1988	DY-195	16.1/26

=== Season 9 (1988–89) ===
No. overall	No. in season	Title	Directed by	Written by	Original release date	Prod. code	US viewers (millions)	Rating/share (households)
199	1	"Broken Krystle"	Irving J. Moore	Story by : David Paulsen & Barbara Esensten & James Harmon Brown; Teleplay by : Barbara Esensten & James Harmon Brown	November 3, 1988	DY-196	17.9	12.8/20
200	2	"A Touch of Sable"	Irving J. Moore	Story by : David Paulsen & Ron Renauld; Teleplay by : Ron Renauld	November 10, 1988	DY-197	17.8	12.4/19
201	3	"She's Back"	Nancy Malone	Story by : David Paulsen & James Harmon Brown & Barbara Esensten; Teleplay by : James Harmon Brown & Barbara Esensten	December 1, 1988	DY-198	14.8	10.9/17
202	4	"Body Trouble"	Dwight Adair	Story by : David Paulsen & Tita Bell & Robert Wolfe; Teleplay by : Tita Bell & Robert Wolfe	December 8, 1988	DY-199	12.9	9.7/15
203	5	"Alexis in Blunderland"	Nancy Malone	Story by : David Paulsen & Ron Renauld; Teleplay by : Ron Renauld	December 15, 1988	DY-200	14.2	10.7/17
204	6	"Every Picture Tells a Story"	Bruce Bilson	Story by : David Paulsen & Barbara Esensten & James Harmon Brown; Teleplay by : Barbara Esensten & James Harmon Brown	December 22, 1988	DY-201	14.1	10.3/17
205	7	"The Last Hurrah"	Dwight Adair	Story by : David Paulsen & Tita Bell & Robert Wolfe; Teleplay by : Tita Bell & Robert Wolfe	January 5, 1989	DY-202	14.1	10.8/16
206	8	"The Wedding"	Jerry Jameson	Story by : David Paulsen & Tita Bell & Robert Wolfe; Teleplay by : Tita Bell & Robert Wolfe	January 12, 1989	DY-203	15.1	10.8/16
207	9	"Ginger Snaps"	Kate Swofford Tilley	Story by : David Paulsen & Clyde Ware; Teleplay by : Clyde Ware	January 26, 1989	DY-204	14.4	10.4/16
208	10	"Delta Woe"	Dwight Adair	Story by : David Paulsen & Don Heckman; Teleplay by : Don Heckman	February 2, 1989	DY-205	15.2	10.7/16
209	11	"Tankers, Cadavers to Chance"	Kate Swofford Tilley	Story by : David Paulsen & Roberto Loiederman; Teleplay by : Roberto Loiederman	February 9, 1989	DY-206	9.4	7.0/12
210	12	"All Hands on Dex"	Dwight Adair	Story by : David Paulsen & Don Heckman; Teleplay by : Don Heckman	February 16, 1989	DY-207	14.7	10.6/16
211	13	"Virginia Reels"	Bruce Bilson	Story by : David Paulsen & Barbara Esensten & James Harmon Brown; Teleplay by : Barbara Esensten & James Harmon Brown	February 23, 1989	DY-208	13.9	10.3/16
212	14	"House of the Falling Son"	Alan Myerson	Story by : David Paulsen & Ron Renauld; Teleplay by : Ron Renauld	March 2, 1989	DY-209	13.5	10.0/15
213	15	"The Son Also Rises"	Ron Satlof	Story by : David Paulsen & Roberto Loiederman; Teleplay by : Roberto Loiederman	March 16, 1989	DY-210	12.5	9.4/15
214	16	"Grimes and Punishment"	Nancy Malone	Story by : David Paulsen & Tita Bell & Robert Wolfe; Teleplay by : Tita Bell & Robert Wolfe	March 23, 1989	DY-211	14.9	10.9/18
215	17	"Sins of the Father"	Bruce Bilson	Story by : David Paulsen & Barbara Esensten & James Harmon Brown; Teleplay by : Barbara Esensten & James Harmon Brown	March 30, 1989	DY-212	14.3	10.3/16
216	18	"Tale of the Tape"	Dwight Adair	Story by : David Paulsen & Roberto Loiederman; Teleplay by : Roberto Loiederman	April 13, 1989	DY-213	14.2	10.6/17
217	19	"No Bones About It"	Michael Lange	Story by : David Paulsen & Tita Bell & Robert Wolfe; Teleplay by : Tita Bell & Robert Wolfe	April 20, 1989	DY-214	14.6	10.9/18
218	20	"Here Comes the Son"	Jerry Jameson	Story by : David Paulsen & Barbara Esensten & James Harmon Brown; Teleplay by : Barbara Esensten & James Harmon Brown	April 27, 1989	DY-215	12.2	9.1/15
219	21	"Blasts from the Past"	David Paulsen	Story by : David Paulsen & Tita Bell & Robert Wolfe; Teleplay by : Tita Bell & Robert Wolfe	May 4, 1989	DY-216	12.3	9.4/15
220	22	"Catch 22"	David Paulsen	Samuel J. Pelovitz	May 11, 1989	DY-217	14.7	10.8/17

== The Reunion ==
No.	Title	Directed by	Written by	Original release date	Prod. code	US viewers (millions)
1	"Part 1"	Irving J. Moore	Esther & Richard Shapiro & Edward De Blasio & Eileen & Robert Pollock	October 20, 1991	101	23.0
2	"Part 2"	Irving J. Moore	Esther & Richard Shapiro & Edward De Blasio & Eileen & Robert Pollock	October 22, 1991	102	20.3

== Ratings ==
Dynasty (1981) : U.S. viewers per episode (millions)

Season	Episode number																															Average
Season	1	2	3	4	5	6	7	8	9	10	11	12	13	14	15	16	17	18	19	20	21	22	23	24	25	26	27	28	29	30	31	Average
1	22.2	22.2	22.2	21.0	18.4	20.4	16.0	15.4	18.7	18.7	17.5	18.3	17.9	16.3	18.5	–																19.0
2	18.8	22.7	17.7	20.9	18.5	18.5	17.3	18.5	20.7	19.4	20.3	19.6	19.7	21.3	21.0	21.8	23.0	23.7	21.0	20.8	21.4	22.7	–									20.2
3	25.6	23.2	25.8	19.6	19.1	20.6	21.2	21.3	21.5	19.3	22.5	22.9	21.9	26.3	24.3	20.9	21.5	22.5	25.2	22.0	24.6	22.5	23.2	27.3	–							22.4
4	27.2	22.5	25.0	22.9	22.1	23.8	20.6	21.3	24.4	25.7	23.8	26.0	23.9	25.7	24.8	25.4	23.8	24.2	25.9	24.6	25.1	25.2	23.6	21.6	23.3	25.2	25.7	–				24.1
5	22.2	25.1	26.1	26.3	24.9	25.7	23.5	24.3	24.3	25.2	25.3	25.9	26.2	27.7	27.0	25.0	27.0	25.9	23.4	24.6	24.8	24.8	24.8	22.6	23.1	23.1	24.5	21.9	25.9	–		25.0
6	28.1	23.4	22.5	20.6	22.0	24.2	24.2	22.4	20.6	21.8	21.4	20.0	17.7	21.1	20.4	24.2	23.9	20.2	22.5	22.8	19.8	22.0	22.6	21.3	20.2	21.1	21.0	19.2	19.5	20.5	21.9	21.8
7	20.1	18.7	17.8	17.0	16.7	16.2	15.6	15.9	16.7	17.2	16.7	13.7	18.4	18.5	19.6	18.9	18.2	17.8	16.9	13.7	16.5	16.8	18.6	16.3	17.4	16.9	16.8	17.6	–			17.2
8	16.5	15.2	15.4	15.2	13.8	14.9	13.4	13.3	14.9	15.7	11.7	13.5	13.2	14.9	16.3	14.4	14.9	15.0	11.1	12.3	13.6	16.1	–									14.3
9	17.9	17.8	14.8	12.9	14.2	14.1	14.1	15.1	14.4	15.2	9.4	14.7	13.9	13.5	12.5	14.9	14.3	14.2	14.6	12.2	12.3	14.7	–									14.2
Reunion	23.0	20.3	–																													21.7

Audience measurement performed by Nielsen Media Research

== See also ==
- Carrington family tree
