= Dynasty (1981 TV series) =

American prime time soap opera

- Genre: Soap opera
- Created by: Richard and Esther Shapiro
- Directed by: Irving J. Moore
- Starring: John Forsythe; Linda Evans; Joan Collins; Pamela Sue Martin; John James; Emma Samms; Jack Coleman; Al Corley; Pamela Bellwood; Bo Hopkins; Lloyd Bochner; Gordon Thomson; Heather Locklear; Lee Bergere; Kathleen Beller; Michael Nader; Diahann Carroll; Catherine Oxenberg; Michael Praed; Kate O'Mara; Stephanie Beacham; Christopher Cazenove; Geoffrey Scott; Ted McGinley; Leann Hunley; Terri Garber; Tracy Scoggins; Katy Kurtzman; Dale Robertson; Wayne Northrop; James Farentino; Karen Cellini; Deborah Adair; Helmut Berger; Billy Dee Williams; George Hamilton; James Healey
- Theme music composer: Bill Conti
- Country of origin: United States
- Original language: English
- No. of seasons: 9 + two-part reunion
- No. of episodes: 222 (list of episodes)

Production
- Executive producers: Aaron Spelling; Douglas S. Cramer; Richard and Esther Shapiro
- Producers: E. Duke Vincent; Eileen & Robert Mason Pollock (s. 2–4); Camille Marchetta (s. 5); Diana Gould (s. 6); Laurence Heath (s. 7); James Harmon Brown & Barbara Esensten (s. 8); David Paulsen (s. 9)
- Running time: 48–50 minutes
- Production companies: Aaron Spelling Productions; 20th Century Fox Television

Original release
- Network: ABC
- Release: January 12, 1981 – May 11, 1989

Related
- Dynasty II: The Colbys (1985–1987); Dynasty: The Reunion (1991); Dynasty: The Making of a Guilty Pleasure (2005); Dynasty Reunion: Catfights & Caviar (2006); Dynasty (2017–2022)

Dynasty is an American prime time soap opera that aired on ABC from January 12, 1981, to May 11, 1989. The series, created by Richard and Esther Shapiro and produced by Aaron Spelling, revolves around the Carringtons, a wealthy family residing in Denver. Dynasty stars John Forsythe as oil magnate Blake Carrington, Linda Evans as his new wife Krystle, and later Joan Collins as his former wife Alexis.

Dynasty was conceived by ABC to compete with CBS's prime time series Dallas. Ratings for the show's first season were unimpressive, but a revamp for the second season that included the arrival of Collins as scheming Alexis saw ratings enter the top 20. By the fall of 1982, it was a top 10 show, and by the spring of 1985, it was the #1 show in the United States. The series declined considerably in popularity during its final three seasons, and it was ultimately cancelled in the spring of 1989 after nine seasons and 220 episodes. A two-part miniseries, Dynasty: The Reunion, aired in October 1991. A reboot series with a new cast premiered on The CW in October 2017.

Dynasty was nominated for the Golden Globe Award for Best Television Series – Drama every year from 1981 to 1986, winning in 1984. The series spawned a successful line of fashion and luxury products, and also a spin-off series called The Colbys. Other notable cast members included Pamela Sue Martin, Lloyd Bochner, Heather Locklear, Catherine Oxenberg, Michael Nader, Diahann Carroll, Emma Samms, Rock Hudson, Kate O'Mara, and Stephanie Beacham.

== Series history ==
=== Development ===
Aaron Spelling, already well known for his successful ABC series, including Starsky & Hutch, Charlie's Angels, The Love Boat, Fantasy Island, Vega$ and Hart to Hart, took on Richard and Esther Shapiro's vision of a rich and powerful family who "lived and sinned" in a 48-room Denver mansion. Esther Shapiro said that an inspiration for the show was I, Claudius, a fictionalized depiction of the Julio-Claudian dynasty of Roman emperors. Shapiro said in 1985, "We wanted to do something that would be fun, an American fantasy. We thought people had seen enough stories where families fell apart. We wanted a strong, nineteenth-century sort of family where people were in conflict but loved each other in spite of everything."

Intended by ABC to be a competitor for CBS's Dallas, the working title for Dynasty was Oil. Initially, the two main families featured in the series were known as the Parkhursts and Corbys. By the time production began, they had been renamed the Carringtons and Colbys. George Peppard was cast as series patriarch Blake Carrington, but ultimately had difficulties dealing with the somewhat unsympathetic role, and was quickly replaced with John Forsythe. Filmed in 1980, the pilot was among many delayed due to a strike precipitated by animosity between the television networks and the partnership of the Screen Actors Guild and the American Federation of Television and Radio Artists. Dynasty finally premiered on ABC as a three-hour event on January 12, 1981.

During its run, Dynasty explored issues such as rape, homosexuality and racial integration, and put middle-aged women in the forefront. Acknowledging that the show is, however, primarily entertaining, producer Douglas S. Cramer said, "We walk a fine line, just this side of camp. Careful calculations are made. We sense that while it might be wonderful for Krystle and Alexis to have a catfight in a koi pond, it would be inappropriate for Joan to smack Linda with a koi."

=== Carringtons ===
As Dynasty begins, powerful oil tycoon Blake Carrington (John Forsythe) is about to marry the younger Krystle Jennings (Linda Evans), his former secretary. Beautiful, earnest, and new to Blake's world, Krystle finds a hostile reception in the Carrington household—the staff patronizes her, and Blake's headstrong and promiscuous daughter Fallon (Pamela Sue Martin) resents her. Though devoted to Krystle, Blake himself is too preoccupied with his company, Denver-Carrington, and blind to Krystle's predicament. Her only ally is her stepson Steven (Al Corley), whose complicated relationship with Blake stems from their fundamental political differences and Steven's reluctance to step into his role as future leader of the Carrington empire. Meanwhile, Fallon, better suited to follow in Blake's footsteps, is (as a woman) underestimated by and considered little more than a trophy to her father. She channels her energies into toying with various male suitors, including the Carrington chauffeur Michael Culhane (Wayne Northrop). At the end of the three-hour premiere episode "Oil", Steven finally confronts his father, criticizing Blake's capitalistic values and seemingly amoral business practices. Blake explodes, revealing the secret of which Steven thought his father was unaware: Blake is disgusted by Steven's homosexuality, and his refusal to "conform" sets father and son at odds for some time.

In counterpoint to the Carringtons are the Blaisdels; Denver-Carrington geologist Matthew (Bo Hopkins)—unhappily married to the emotionally fragile Claudia (Pamela Bellwood)—is Krystle's ex-lover. Returning from an extended assignment in the Middle East, Matthew quits and goes into business with wildcatter Walter Lankershim (Dale Robertson), and as Blake's behavior begins pushing Krystle toward Matthew, the men are set as both business and romantic rivals. Blake is further enraged when Steven goes to work for longtime friend Matthew, in whom Steven sees qualities lacking in Blake. Though previously in a relationship with another man, Steven finds himself drawn to Claudia, who is putting her life back together after spending time in a psychiatric hospital. Esther Shapiro later said in the DVD commentary of the first season, "The audience told us almost immediately: All they wanted to do was be in the mansion. [They] couldn't care less about the oil fields. They didn't want to see grubby rooms."

Fallon makes a secret business deal with Blake's old friend and more-powerful business rival Cecil Colby (Lloyd Bochner), marrying his nephew Jeff (John James) to secure Cecil's financial assistance for her father. When Blake stumbles upon Steven in an innocent goodbye embrace with his former lover Ted Dinard (Mark Withers), Blake angrily pushes the two men apart; Ted falls backward and hits his head, the injury proving fatal. Blake is arrested and charged with murder, and an angry Steven testifies that Ted's death had been the result of malicious intent. A veiled surprise witness for the prosecution appears in the season finale "The Testimony", and Fallon gasps in recognition: "My God, that's my mother!"

The series' first 13 episodes have been seen in retrospect to be Dynasty's "arthouse" era, a brief period before its characters were flattened into the caricatures that came to define the prime-time soap genre thanks to "ratings pressures and the introduction of diva Joan Collins ... [which] put an end to challenging story lines". The arrival of Collins polarized the series into a "Krystle versus Alexis" while marginalizing supporting characters including Steven, Fallon and Claudia. The first season of Dynasty was "modestly popular" among viewers, ranking #28 with a 19.0 Nielsen rating, while #1 series Dallas achieved a 31.8 rating that season. ABC reran season one in summer 1981 at 10:00 PM on Wednesdays, the new time slot for season two and initiated a media blitz to promote the series.

=== "Enter Alexis" ===
In the first episode of the second season, titled "Enter Alexis", the mysterious witness removes her sunglasses to reveal British actress Joan Collins as a new arrival to the series. Collins's Alexis Carrington blazed a trail across the show and its story lines; the additions of Collins and the "formidable writing team" of Eileen and Robert Mason Pollock are generally credited with Dynasty's subsequent rise in the Nielsen ratings. The Pollocks "soft-pedaled the business angle" of the show and "bombarded viewers with every soap opera staple in the book, presented at such a fast clip that a new tragedy seemed to befall the Carrington family every five minutes." Alexis's testimony notwithstanding, Krystle is immediately put off by the former Mrs. Carrington's condescending attitude and manipulations; Krystle's subsequent discovery that Alexis had caused her miscarriage by intentionally startling her horse with a gunshot settles Alexis as Krystle's implacable nemesis. Other new characters of the season are the psychiatrist Nick Toscanni (James Farentino), who tries to seduce Krystle while bedding Fallon and plotting against Blake; and Krystle's greedy niece Sammy Jo Dean (Heather Locklear), who marries Steven for his money. The season finale sees Blake left for dead on a mountain after a fight with Nick. By that time, Dynasty had entered the Top 20. Esther Shapiro lamented in the season one DVD commentary, "Had the series been left to us, and been a less huge hit, I think we would have seen these characters realized pretty much the way they are [in season one]. When Alexis came into it, it changed the tenor...And that's the way they are now on television: you have your traditional villain, and I think that plays to a different denominator."

In the third season (ranked fifth in the ratings), Alexis marries Cecil on his deathbed and acquires his company, ColbyCo. In the meantime, Adam Carrington (Gordon Thomson), the long-lost son of Alexis and Blake who had been kidnapped in infancy, reappears in Denver and almost starts an affair with Fallon before they discover they are siblings. Also introduced are Krystle's ex-husband, tennis pro Mark Jennings (Geoffrey Scott), and Kirby Anders (Kathleen Beller), the daughter of longtime Carrington majordomo Joseph (Lee Bergere). Kirby catches Adam's eye but weds Jeff after his divorce from Fallon. In the middle of the season, news that Steven has been killed in an accident in Indonesia comes to the Carringtons; he survives, but undergoes plastic surgery and returns to Denver (portrayed by Jack Coleman). In the third-season cliffhanger, Alexis lures Krystle to Steven's cabin and the two are locked inside while the cabin is set ablaze by an unseen arsonist, later revealed to be Joseph, who had meant for the fire to kill only Alexis and not Krystle.

With the show's popularity soaring in the fourth season (now the third-most-watched program of 1983–1984), former President Gerald Ford guest-starred as himself in 1983, along with his wife Betty and former Secretary of State Henry Kissinger. New characters included the charming and ambitious Farnsworth "Dex" Dexter (Michael Nader), the scheming public relations assistant Tracy Kendall (Deborah Adair), the unscrupulous playboy Peter De Vilbis (Helmut Berger), and Blake's illegitimate African American half-sister, Dominique Deveraux (Diahann Carroll). The main story lines included a custody battle between Steven and Blake over Steven and Sammy Jo's son Danny, and a false accusation of illegal weapons dealings orchestrated by Alexis to ruin Blake's financial empire. In the season finale, Fallon disappears just before her second wedding to Jeff (now divorced from Kirby) as her car seemingly collides with a truck on a stormy night (to accommodate the departure of Pamela Sue Martin from the series), while Alexis is arrested for the murder of Mark Jennings.

Driven by the new head writer and producer Camille Marchetta, who had devised the wildly successful "Who Shot J.R.?" scenario on Dallas five years earlier, Dynasty hit No. 1 in the fifth season. In the story, Alexis is exonerated and her secret daughter Amanda Bedford (Catherine Oxenberg) comes to Denver and discovers that Blake is her father. Steven has married Claudia but leaves her for a man and Claudia starts an affair with Adam. The marriage of Blake and Krystle is in crisis after the birth of their daughter Krystina, Dominique struggles to be accepted as a Carrington and loses her husband Brady Lloyd (Billy Dee Williams) in the process, and Sammy Jo discovers she is the heiress to a huge fortune. At the end of the season, an amnesiac Fallon (now portrayed by actress Emma Samms) reappears while the rest of the family go to Europe for the wedding of Amanda and Prince Michael of Moldavia (Michael Praed).

During the season, Dynasty attracted controversy when Rock Hudson's real-life HIV-positive status was revealed after a romantic storyline between his character Daniel Reece and Evans's Krystle. Hudson's scenes required him to kiss Evans and, as news that he had contracted AIDS broke, there was speculation Evans would be at risk. The event led to a Screen Actors Guild rule requiring the notification of performers in advance of any scenes that require open-mouth kissing.

Over the run of the series, the rivalry between Alexis and Krystle is a primary driver for the melodrama. Alexis resents Krystle's role as Blake's wife and mistress of the Carrington household, and tries to undermine her at every opportunity, while Krystle makes increasingly bold efforts to keep Alexis from interfering in the lives of their mutual loved ones. Social and media critics have noted the rivalry is also rooted in the long-standing trope regarding blonde and brunette women in competition with each other.

"Dynasty upped the ante. On one side was blond stay-at-home Krystle Carrington, the Mother Teresa of soaps, endlessly empathetic and supportive, always willing to listen and care, beloved by her servants. . . . In the other corner was the most delicious bitch ever seen on television, the dark haired, scheming, duplicitous, supremely self-centered and self-assured career vixen, Alexis Carrington Colby. Krystle just wanted to make her husband happy; Alexis wanted to control the world. How could you not love a catfight between these two?"

The pair have numerous verbal spats that sometimes lead to physical altercations. "Unfortunately, the thing people remember about this show is the catfights," noted Collins in 1991. Entertainment columnist Sue Cameron said in 2018 that the catfights became so popular that the press were invited to watch the filming of them. Krystle and Alexis famously brawl for the first time in Alexis's studio, and then later in a lily pond. They also hurl mud at each other at a beauty salon, and slide down a ravine together into a puddle of mud, before having their final showdown brawl in a fashion studio in the 1991 miniseries Dynasty: The Reunion. Later in the series, Alexis also has a catfight with Blake's half-sister Dominique (Diahann Carroll), and then her own cousin Sable (Stephanie Beacham). She even has a brawl with her on-again, off-again lover and one-time husband, Dex (Michael Nader). Krystle's niece Sammy Jo (Heather Locklear) also has her fair share of catfights, as she first engages in a slap fight with Claudia (Pamela Bellwood) before taking on Amanda (Catherine Oxenberg) in a brawl in a swimming pool. Sammy Jo later fights Fallon (Emma Samms) in a horse trough and the mud around it. Evans even battles with herself at the climax of a 1985–1986 storyline in which Krystle is imprisoned and replaced by a lookalike named Rita (also played by Evans); Krystle ends up battling Rita in order to escape. In 2008, Entertainment Weekly termed Alexis and Krystle's catfights "the gold standard of scratching and clawing."

=== "Moldavian Massacre" ===
The so-called "Moldavian Massacre" occurred during the May 15, 1985 fifth-season finale. Amanda and Prince Michael's royal wedding is interrupted by terrorists during a military coup in Moldavia, riddling the chapel with bullets and leaving all of the major characters lying seemingly lifeless. Esther Shapiro later said, "It was a fairy-tale terrorist attack. It was beautifully shot, like a Goya painting." It was watched by an audience of 25.9 million. In 2011, Ken Tucker of Entertainment Weekly named it one of the seven "Unforgettable Cliff-Hangers" of prime time dramatic television.

When the series resumed on September 25, 1985, it was revealed that only two minor characters had died: Steven's boyfriend Luke Fuller (Billy Campbell), who was mortally wounded saving Claudia's life, and Jeff's love interest Lady Ashley Mitchell (Ali MacGraw). In the 2006 CBS special Dynasty Reunion: Catfights & Caviar, Gordon Thomson stated that it was the follow-up that was the letdown, not the cliffhanger itself. John James stated in the 2001 episode of E! True Hollywood Story featuring Dynasty that the Moldavian Massacre was when the show "maxed out" and "overdosed" on outrageousness. Creator Esther Shapiro stated in 2001 that she thought the cliffhanger was "well produced" but that they "could've done something else".

Joan Collins was absent from the season six opener, as she was in a tense contract renegotiation with the show, seeking an increased salary. As a result, the first episode had to be rewritten to explain her absence and many of Alexis's scenes were given to Krystle. Collins's demands were met (she reportedly signed a $60,000 per episode contract) and she returned to the series in the season's second episode. Despite her absence, the first episode of season six garnered a 28.1 rating (becoming the most watched episode of the series) as viewers wanted to see who had survived the season five cliffhanger.

=== Continuing seasons and decline ===
Although still a top ten series, Dynasty dropped from first to seventh place in the ratings for its sixth season, which featured a look-alike woman named Rita who poses as Krystle (with both roles played by Linda Evans), introduced Alexis's sister Caress (Kate O'Mara), and launched the spin-off series The Colbys. Spurned by Blake, Alexis finds his estranged brother Ben (Christopher Cazenove) and the duo successfully plot to strip Blake of his fortune. Steven's budding relationship with the closeted Bart Fallmont (Kevin Conroy) is ruined by Adam's business-motivated public revelation that Bart is gay. Amanda, who has divorced Prince Michael, fights with Sammy Jo for the favors of Clay Fallmont (Ted McGinley). The May 21, 1986, season finale finds Blake strangling Alexis while the rest of the cast is in peril at the La Mirage hotel, which has been accidentally set afire by Claudia.

As the seventh season begins in September 1986, Blake stops short of killing Alexis, whom he had been strangling in the previous season's cliffhanger, after learning she had bought his mansion and was evicting him and Krystle. Claudia has died in the fire she set, and Amanda (now played by Karen Cellini) is rescued by a returning Michael Culhane, Blake's chauffeur from the first season. Blake turns the tables on Ben and Alexis and recovers his wealth, but loses his memory after an oil rig explosion. Alexis finds Blake and, with everyone believing he is dead, perpetuates the belief that they are still married. Living with a clean slate, Alexis finds herself softening to Blake but ultimately tells him the truth as he reunites with Krystle. Krystina receives a heart transplant but is later temporarily kidnapped by Sarah Curtis (Cassie Yates), the mother of the dead girl from whom Krystina received her new heart; Sammy Jo's marriage to Clay crumbles and she falls into bed with Steven; Amanda leaves town; and Ben's daughter Leslie (Terri Garber) arrives. Adam's season-long romance with Blake's secretary Dana Waring (Leann Hunley) culminates in a wedding, which is punctuated in the May 6, 1987, season finale by Alexis's car plunging off a bridge into a river and the violent return of a vengeful Matthew Blaisdel. Although the first episode of season seven premiered with a high Nielsen rating of a 20.1, the competition with Magnum, P.I., now in the same time slot, and the constant storyline changes led to Dynasty falling out of the top 20 to No. 25.

With The Colbys cancelled, Jeff and Fallon return for Dynasty's eighth season, their marriage falling apart again. Matthew, returned from the dead but troubled by headaches, holds the Carringtons hostage in hopes that Krystle will run away with him. Steven ends the siege by reluctantly stabbing his old friend to death. Alexis is saved by a handsome, mysterious stranger, Sean Rowan (James Healey). She later marries him, not realizing that he is Joseph's son and Kirby's brother, bent on revenge. Steven and Sammy Jo's reconciliation is short-lived, and the pursuit of children unravels Adam and Dana's marriage. Sean begins to manipulate and destroy the Carringtons from the inside, and he fights Dex to the death in the March 30, 1988 season finale. Blake, who failed being elected as governor of Colorado, comes home to find Krystle missing and their bedroom in shambles. For the first time since its debut, the show had dropped out of the top 30, to No. 41 in the ratings.

David Paulsen joined Dynasty as Executive Supervising Producer for its ninth season, and took over the plotting of the series. In a money-saving move, Evans appeared in only six episodes early in the season as an ailing Krystle seeks brain surgery in Switzerland but is left in an offscreen coma. Similarly to cut costs, Collins was contracted for only 13 out of the season's 22 episodes. Former The Colbys character Sable (Stephanie Beacham) was brought in as both a platonic confidante for Blake and a nemesis for Alexis, and Tracy Scoggins also reprised her Colbys role as Sable's daughter Monica. A storyline involving a murder and an old secret tying the Carrington, Colby, and Dexter families together spanned the season as Alexis and Sable sparred first over business and then over Dex. The series moved from Wednesday to Thursday, but ratings continued to decline and Dynasty was ranked No. 69 in the United States for the season. In May 1989, new ABC entertainment president Robert A. Iger cancelled Dynasty, making the last episode of season nine the series finale. The show ended on a cliffhanger with Blake, Fallon, Krystina, Alexis, and Dex in mortal peril.

=== Reunion miniseries ===
As an attempt to wrap up plotlines left unresolved by Dynasty's cancellation, ABC produced a two-part miniseries titled Dynasty: The Reunion, which aired in October 1991.

Many of the cast members, including John Forsythe, Joan Collins, John James, Heather Locklear and Emma Samms agreed to reprise their roles in early 1991. It was unknown during pre-production which characters the reunion film would include. Linda Evans was brought back last-minute, just before the final script was penned, as was Kathleen Beller. Jack Coleman, who had played Steven Carrington from 1982 to 1988, was unavailable to reprise his role, so he was replaced with Al Corley, who originated the part in 1981. Gordon Thomson also originally agreed to appear in the film but ABC refused to align the shooting schedule with his work on the daytime series Santa Barbara, and replaced him with Robin Sachs.

Dynasty: The Reunion aired on October 20 and October 22, 1991. The first night averaged 16.8 million viewers, the second night averaged 15.3 million. Both parts ranked in the Top 20 for the week, and second place in their respective time slots, behind the World Series on CBS. Critical reviews were not favorable, with many feeling the script was poor and that the film was merely an attempt of ABC's wish to "cash-in" on an old series.

== Production ==
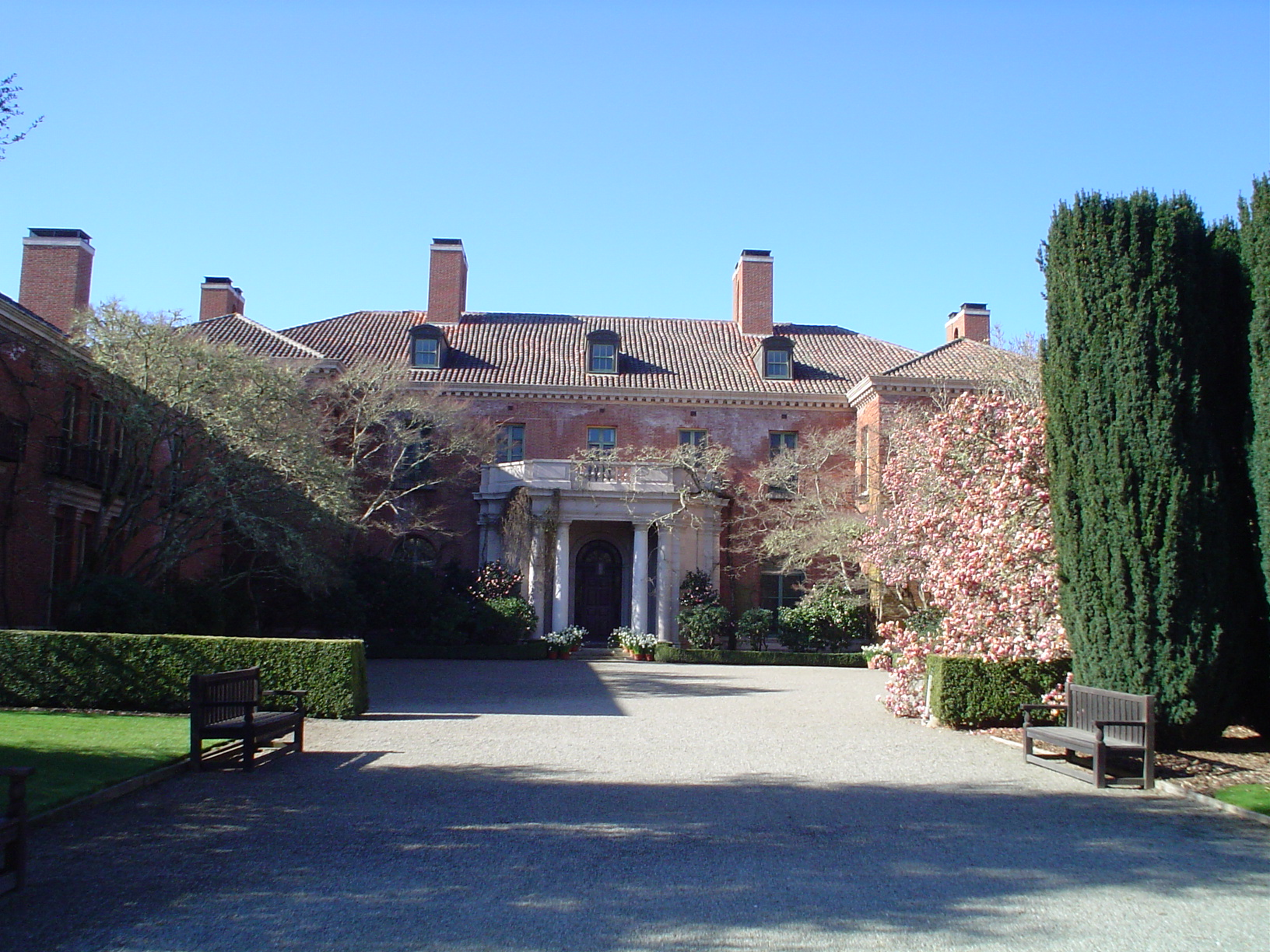
An exterior view of Filoli, used as the Carrington mansion on Dynasty

Dynasty was shot at Warner Hollywood Studios in West Hollywood, California. The Filoli estate in Woodside, California, was used as the 48-room Carrington mansion in the opening credits, establishing shots, and some outdoor scenes in the pilot episode. Some of the other exterior shots of the Carrington mansion (including the lily pond catfight) were shot at a 17-room Palladian house called Arden Villa in Pasadena, California.

Costume designer Nolan Miller designed approximately 3,000 costumes over the course of the series, saying "I never want to see them wearing the same outfit twice". His weekly wardrobe budget was $35,000.

John Forsythe was the only cast member to appear in all 220 episodes of the series. Linda Evans appeared in 204 of the 220 episodes, leaving the series after appearing in only six episodes of the ninth and final season. Joan Collins, who did not join the cast until the second season, also missed one episode in season 6 and nine episodes in season 9, and was consequently present for a total of 195 episodes. Forsythe and John James were the only two original cast members to appear in the final episode.

== Episodes ==
| Season | Episodes | Originally released | | Rank | Rating | Ref. |
| Season | Episodes | First released | Last released | Rank | Rating | Ref. |
|---|---|---|---|---|---|---|
| 1 | 15 | January 12, 1981 | April 20, 1981 | #28 (tied) | 19.0 | |
| 2 | 22 | November 11, 1981 | May 5, 1982 | #19 | 20.2 | |
| 3 | 24 | October 27, 1982 | April 20, 1983 | #5 | 22.4 | |
| 4 | 27 | September 28, 1983 | May 9, 1984 | #3 | 24.1 | |
| 5 | 29 | September 26, 1984 | May 15, 1985 | #1 | 25.0 | |
| 6 | 31 | September 25, 1985 | May 21, 1986 | #7 | 21.8 | |
| 7 | 28 | September 24, 1986 | May 6, 1987 | #24 | 17.2 | |
| 8 | 22 | September 23, 1987 | March 30, 1988 | #41 | 14.3 | |
| 9 | 22 | November 3, 1988 | May 11, 1989 | #69 | 10.5 | |
| The Reunion | 2 | October 20, 1991 | October 22, 1991 | #15 (Part 1) #17 (Part 2) | 16.8; 15.3 | |

=== U.S. Nielsen ratings ===
Dynasty was a top 30 show from its first through seventh season, reaching No. 1 for the 1984–85 season with a Nielsen rating of 25.0 or an average tune-in audience of 21.2 million homes per episode.

=== Syndication ===
Dynasty was initially syndicated in reruns by Metromedia Producers Corporation in September 1985, on stations such as KTTV in Los Angeles, and WNEW-TV 5 in New York City, while season 6 began airing on ABC. This initial syndication package consisted of all 117 episodes (originally 114 on ABC) that had been produced up to this point.

== Impact and reception ==
At the height of Dynasty's popularity in 1985, Esther Shapiro said, "we've done important things for women with Dynasty. For middle-aged women. You know, to let them know that it's OK to want power and be romantic." Collins said in 2018, "Every single person on Dynasty was good-looking. You wanted to see rich, good-looking people fighting with each other."

In 2012, The New York Times credited the popularity of Nolan Miller's costumes with "setting a trend for thick shoulder pads during a decade of power dressing". The public often cited the show as popularizing large shoulder pads for women, and the show was one of a few sources that did help make more appealing to people the large shoulder pads that designers had been trying to get women to wear since 1978. The style of the show's stars in turn influenced the way high-fashion designers presented their outfits, designers like Christian Lacroix, who said in 1985 that the "modern glamour" of Dynasty and Dallas was on his mind when he conceived his mid-eighties collections.

=== Awards and nominations ===
Dynasty was nominated for the Golden Globe Award for Best Television Series – Drama every year from 1981 to 1986, winning in 1984. Forsythe and Collins were also nominated for Best Actor and Best Actress every year from 1981 to 1986, and Evans was nominated for Best Actress every year from 1981 to 1985. Evans won in 1982 (tying with Barbara Bel Geddes of rival series Dallas), Forsythe won in 1983 and 1984, and Collins won in 1983. John James and Gordon Thomson were also nominated for the Golden Globe Award for Best Supporting Actor – Series, Miniseries or Television Film (James in 1985, and Thomson in 1987).

The series was nominated for 24 Emmy Awards over the course of its run, but only won once, for Outstanding Costumes for a Series in 1984. The show was nominated for a Primetime Emmy Award for Outstanding Drama Series in 1982. From 1982 to 1984, Forsythe received three consecutive nominations for Primetime Emmy Award for Outstanding Lead Actor in a Drama Series. Evans and Collins were each nominated for a Primetime Emmy Award for Outstanding Lead Actress in a Drama Series (Evans in 1983, and Collins in 1984); both actresses lost to Tyne Daly for her work on the CBS police drama series Cagney and Lacey.

Dynasty was also an award winner at the People's Choice Awards. Evans won Favorite Female Performer in a New TV Program in 1982, and Favorite Female TV Performer in 1983. In 1984, she won Favorite Female TV Performer, and the series was named Favorite TV Drama in a tie with the NBC drama Hill Street Blues. Evans and the series again won those same honors in 1985, with Evans sharing the Favorite Female TV Performer prize with her co-star, Collins. Evans won the award again in 1986, and the series tied with Miami Vice for Favorite TV Dramatic Program. In 1987, Dynasty tied with the CBS series Dallas for the award Favorite Nighttime Dramatic Serial. Dynasty won Soap Opera Digest Awards in 1984 and 1985 for Outstanding Primetime Soap. In 1984 Forsythe, Evans and Collins won the awards for Outstanding Lead Actor, Actress and Villainess. John Forsythe won another award for Outstanding Actor in a Mature Role. Evans and Collins won the awards in the same categories in 1985, while Catherine Oxenberg won two awards, for Outstanding Supporting Actress and Outstanding Female Newcomer.

=== Spin-offs and television events ===
A spin-off, The Colbys, debuted in 1985, as Fallon "returned from the dead" and ex-husband Jeff followed her to Los Angeles, where they became embroiled in the family intrigues of Jeff's wealthy California relatives. Pamela Sue Martin had been asked to reprise the role of Fallon but declined which led to the casting of Emma Samms in the role. Ratings for The Colbys were poor and the show lasted for just two seasons, ending in 1987. Both Fallon and Jeff returned to Dynasty after the series ended.

The cable channel SOAPnet aired repeats of all nine seasons. In January 2004, creator Esther Shapiro participated in a marathon of the show's episodes, called "Serial Bowl: Alexis vs. Krystle", giving behind-the-scenes tidbits and factoids.

On January 2, 2005, ABC aired a fictionalized television movie titled Dynasty: The Making of a Guilty Pleasure, chronicling the creation and backstage details of Dynasty. It received poor reviews both for content and for historical accuracy, and was criticized by Forsythe, Evans, and Collins in separate press releases. Filmed in Australia, the movie starred Bartholomew John as Forsythe, Melora Hardin as Evans, and Alice Krige as Collins. The film begins with a disclaimer noting the inclusion of "time compression and composite and fictionalized characters and incidents," and takes dramatic license with both the historical timeline and events, as well as the fictional storylines originally presented on Dynasty.

On May 2, 2006, a non-fiction television special named Dynasty Reunion: Catfights & Caviar aired on CBS. It assembled former cast members from the series in John Forsythe, Joan Collins and Linda Evans, as well as the four original actors who played the Carrington children (Pamela Sue Martin, Al Corley, Gordon Thomson and Catherine Oxenberg). Heather Locklear, John James, and Diahann Carroll declined to participate, but cast members Pamela Bellwood, Jack Coleman and Emma Samms were included in prerecorded interviews. The special showed various clips from the series, as the cast reminisced about their time on the show. The special was filmed at the Filoli estate, the location originally used for exterior shots of the Carringtons' mansion in the series.

On January 26, 2015, Home & Family hosted a Dynasty reunion for one episode on the Hallmark Channel. It assembled former cast members from the series, including Pamela Sue Martin, Al Corley, Gordon Thomson, John James and Pamela Bellwood. The reunion episode focused on the cast's memories of the show, both on and off-screen; a collection of gowns worn by the female characters; as well as members of the cast participating in several cooking, craft and fashion segments. The reunion episode also featured a new opening of the show's iconic theme song, which included Home & Family hosts Mark Steines and Christina Ferrare. Linda Evans did not participate on-air in the reunion episode, but sent a message to the cast, which was read on air.

=== Commercial tie-ins ===
The creations of series costume designer Nolan Miller became so popular that Dynasty spawned its own line of women's apparel called "The Dynasty Collection"—a series of haute couture designs based on costumes worn by Joan Collins, Linda Evans and Diahann Carroll. A men's fashion line followed. Esther Shapiro herself came up with the idea to produce licensed products that included sheets and towels, jewelry and furs, 'Forever Krystle' perfume, and 'Carrington' men's cologne. Linda Evans was hired as a spokesperson for the beverage Crystal Light due to her character's name.

Two novels were published, based on scripts from early episodes—Dynasty (1983) and Alexis Returns (1984)—written by Eileen Lottman. In 1984, Doubleday/Dolphin published the companion book Dynasty: The Authorized Biography of the Carringtons, which included an introduction by Esther Shapiro. The Authorized Biography featured storyline synopses in the form of extended biographies of the main characters, descriptions of primary locations (like the Carrington Estate and La Mirage) and dozens of photos from the series.

=== Home media ===
The first season of Dynasty was released on Region 1 DVD on April 19, 2005, by 20th Century Fox Home Entertainment. The rights to subsequent seasons (and Season 1 rights for other regions) reverted to CBS DVD (distributed by Paramount) in November 2006. Seasons 1 through 4 were made available on iTunes in May 2012.

| Season | No. of episodes | Region 1 | Region 2 (United Kingdom) | Region 2 (Germany) | Region 2 (Sweden) | Region 4 (Australia) | Notes |
|---|---|---|---|---|---|---|---|
| Season 1 | 15 | April 19, 2005 | March 9, 2009 | July 3, 2008 | April 9, 2008 | April 9, 2008 | All 15 episodes of the first season, interviews with original cast members Pamela Sue Martin and Al Corley, two commentary tracks by creator Esther Shapiro and Corley, Family, Furs and Fun: Creating DYNASTY series overview featurette. |
| Season 2 | 22 | August 14, 2007 | March 9, 2009 | March 5, 2009 | October 22, 2008 | October 1, 2008 | All 22 episodes of the second season, Interactive Season 2 Family Tree (Blake, Alexis, Krystle, Fallon, Jeff, Steven, Sammy Jo and Little Blake profiles). |
| Season 3, Volume 1 | 12 | June 17, 2008 | —N/a | —N/a | —N/a | —N/a | US/Region 1: First 12 episodes of Season 3 |
| Season 3, Volume 2 | 12 | October 21, 2008 | —N/a | —N/a | —N/a | —N/a | US/Region 1: Second 12 episodes of Season 3 |
| Season 3, Complete Season | 24 | —N/a | May 18, 2009 | September 3, 2009 | April 29, 2009 | April 2, 2009 | All 24 episodes of Season 3 released in a single volume |
| Season 4, Volume 1 | 14 | April 7, 2009 | —N/a | —N/a | —N/a | —N/a | US/Region 1: First 14 episodes of Season 4 |
| Season 4, Volume 2 | 13 | February 2, 2010 | —N/a | —N/a | —N/a | —N/a | US/Region 1: Second 13 episodes of Season 4 |
| Season 4, Complete Season | 27 | —N/a | March 8, 2010 | December 3, 2009 | November 25, 2009 | December 24, 2009 | All 27 episodes of Season 4 released in a single volume |
| Season 5, Volume 1 | 15 | July 5, 2011 | —N/a | —N/a | —N/a | —N/a | US/Region 1: First 15 episodes of Season 5 |
| Season 5, Volume 2 | 14 | July 5, 2011 | —N/a | —N/a | —N/a | —N/a | US/Region 1: Second 14 episodes of Season 5 |
| Season 5, Complete Season | 29 | —N/a | June 21, 2010 | July 8, 2010 | July 28, 2010 | August 5, 2010 | All 29 episodes of Season 5 released in a single volume |
| Season 6, Volume 1 | 16 | July 3, 2012 | —N/a | —N/a | —N/a | —N/a | US/Region 1: First 16 episodes of Season 6 |
| Season 6, Volume 2 | 15 | July 3, 2012 | —N/a | —N/a | —N/a | —N/a | US/Region 1: Second 15 episodes of Season 6 |
| Season 6, Complete Season | 31 | —N/a | January 24, 2011 | December 9, 2010 | November 24, 2010 | June 26, 2013 | All 31 episodes of Season 6 released in a single volume |
| Season 7, Volume 1 | 16 | July 9, 2013 | —N/a | —N/a | —N/a | —N/a | US/Region 1: First 16 episodes of Season 7 |
| Season 7, Volume 2 | 12 | July 9, 2013 | —N/a | —N/a | —N/a | —N/a | US/Region 1: Second 12 episodes of Season 7 |
| Season 7, Complete Season | 28 | —N/a | January 30, 2012 | December 8, 2011 | November 16, 2011 | June 26, 2013 | All 28 episodes of Season 7 released in a single volume |
| Season 8, Volume 1 | 12 | April 29, 2014 | —N/a | —N/a | —N/a | —N/a | US/Region 1: First 12 episodes of Season 8 |
| Season 8, Volume 2 | 10 | April 29, 2014 | —N/a | —N/a | —N/a | —N/a | US/Region 1: Second 10 episodes of Season 8 |
| Season 8, Complete Season | 22 | —N/a | July 30, 2012 | September 6, 2012 | August 1, 2012 | June 26, 2013 | All 22 episodes of Season 8 released in a single volume |
| Season 9, Volume 1 | 12 | September 9, 2014 | —N/a | —N/a | —N/a | —N/a | US/Region 1: First 11 episodes of Season 9 |
| Season 9, Volume 2 | 10 | September 9, 2014 | —N/a | —N/a | —N/a | —N/a | US/Region 1: Second 11 episodes of Season 9 |
| Season 9, Complete Season | 22 | —N/a | January 28, 2013 | December 6, 2012 | December 12, 2012 | June 26, 2013 | All 22 episodes of Season 9 released in a single volume |
| The Complete Seasons Boxset | 220 | October 10, 2017 | January 28, 2013 | —N/a | December 12, 2012 | November 5, 2014 | All nine seasons collected together in a single boxed set. |
| The Reunion | 2 | November 1, 2019 | | | | | 1991 Reunion miniseries |

== Reboot series ==
The Shapiros announced on January 12, 2011, that they had written a Dynasty prequel feature film script set in the 1960s, and were shopping it to studios for a possible film franchise. In a September 2011 interview, Dynasty actress Joan Collins chatted about a Dynasty television revival: "I've been in constant contact with Esther Shapiro, who wrote it, and apparently they've written a script."

In September 2016, it was announced that a Dynasty reboot was in development at The CW, co-written by Josh Schwartz, Stephanie Savage, and Sallie Patrick. The project received a series order in May 2017. With the Shapiros also producing, the new series finds heiress Fallon facing off against her soon-to-be stepmother Cristal, a Hispanic woman. The CW's Dynasty features Grant Show as Blake; Elizabeth Gillies as Fallon; Sam Adegoke as Jeff; Robert Christopher Riley as Blake's chauffeur Michael; James Mackay as Steven; Rafael de la Fuente as Sam Jones, a gay male version of Sammy Jo; Alan Dale as Carrington majordomo Anders; Nick Wechsler as Matthew Blaisdel; Brianna Brown as Claudia; Wakeema Hollis as Jeff's sister Monica Colby; Maddison Brown as Kirby, Sam Underwood as Adam; and Michael Michele as Dominique. Nathalie Kelley initially appears as Cristal in season one, but is replaced with Ana Brenda Contreras in season two, who is then recast with Daniella Alonso in season three. Nicollette Sheridan plays Alexis in seasons one and two, and Elaine Hendrix steps into the role for season three.

Season one of the new Dynasty premiered in the United States on October 11, 2017. The series was later renewed for a second, third, fourth, and fifth season. In May 2022, The CW announced the fifth season would be Dynasty's last.
