= Keith Amos =

English footballer

Personal information
- Full name: Keith James Amos
- Date of birth: 13 January 1932
- Place of birth: Walton-on-Thames, England
- Date of death: 12 April 2017 (aged 85)
- Place of death: Surrey, England
- Position: Goalkeeper

Senior career*
Years	Team	Apps	(Gls)
1952–1954	Arsenal	0	(0)
1955–1958	Aldershot	77	(0)
- Kidderminster Harriers
- * Club domestic league appearances and goals

Keith James Amos (13 January 1932 – 12 April 2017) was an English footballer who played in the Football League for Aldershot.
